= Pirie Street Brewery =

Brewery in the early days of the colony of South Australia

The Pirie Street Brewery was a brewery situated on Pirie and Wyatt Streets, Adelaide, in the early days of the British colony of South Australia. It was succeeded on the same site after a few years by the Adelaide Brewery. Its original address was 50-62 Wyatt Street; today the buildings at 54–60 are heritage-listed in the South Australian Heritage Register, and there is a remaining building at 113 Pirie Street now occupied by the Hill Smith Gallery.

This brewery was operational from 1845.

This Adelaide Brewery is not to be confused with the Adelaide Brewery founded by Charles Mallen for W. K. Simms in Waverley, New South Wales.

== History of the company ==
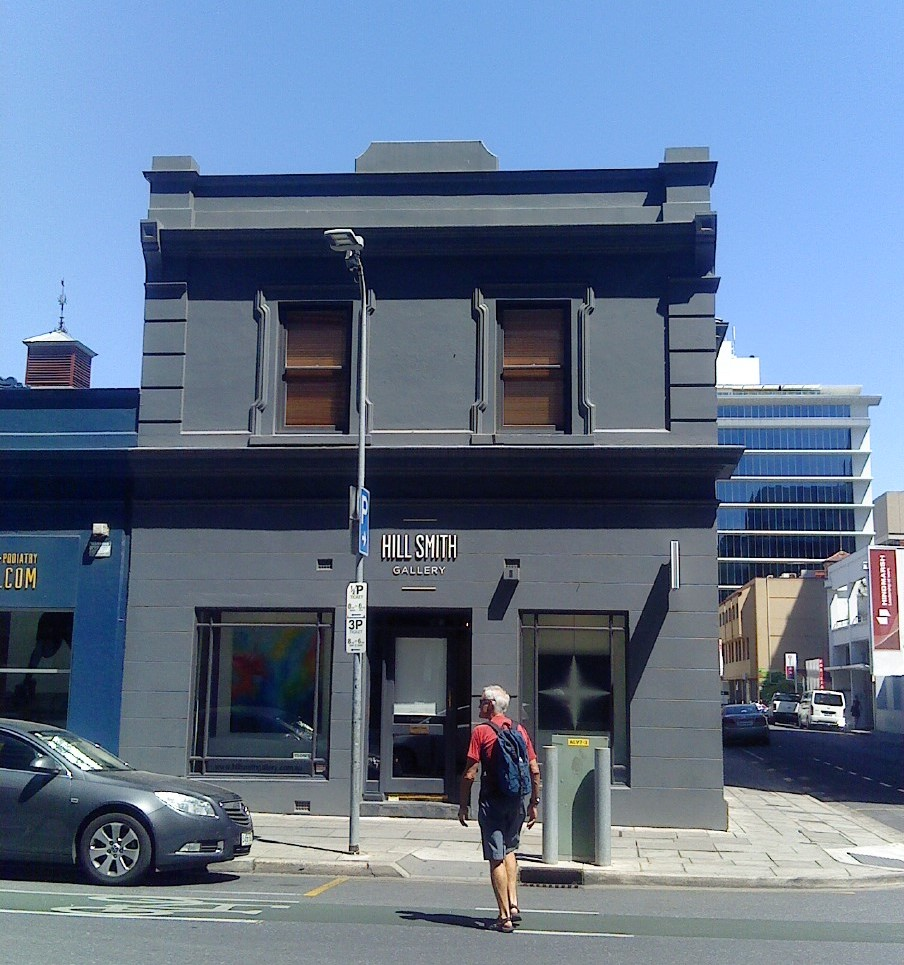
An Adelaide Brewery building, corner Pirie and Wyatt streets

Pirie Street Brewery was operated by James Walsh (1847 to 1851), Simms & Hayter (1851 to July 1853) then Simms & Humble (July 1853 to August 1855), followed by E. J. F. Crawford. Walsh founded the Pirie Street Brewery in 1847 or earlier. It was not popular with those living nearby. In 1851 he sold the business to William Knox Simms and John Hayter, who operated the business as Simms & Hayter.

Samuel Humble joined in 1853, and they traded as Simms & Humble until 1854, when the partnership (which by then included James Chambers) was dissolved. and the business disposed of to E. J. F. Crawford, who ran it until at least 1859. Simms & Co., took over William Clark's Halifax Street Brewery in 1856.

In 1861 James Thomson Syme (died 1883) and Frederick Samuel Sison (died 1891) formed a partnership, Syme & Sison, and established the Adelaide Brewery on the same Pirie Street site. Syme & Sison were also associated with several hotels in Adelaide: the Queen's Arms in Wright Street, the Somerset at the corner of Pulteney and Flinders Streets, and the White Conduit House Hotel in North Street.

In June 1882 they sold the business to Andrew McIntyre, William Wicksteed and Henry Anthony, none of whom had any brewing experience, and continued trading as Syme & Sison.

The Adelaide Brewery was acquired "on very advantageous terms" by the South Australian Brewing Company in 1902.

== The people ==
- James Walsh (c.1811 – 25 April 1873) arrived in South Australia aboard City of London March 1840. He married Mary (?) Nicholson shortly after. they left for England in 1851, but returned to Adelaide in 1854, when he opened a shop in Clark's Buildings, Hindley Street selling English beers. He was later "a large shareholder in the Kadina and Wallaroo Railway Company".
- Samuel Waller Humble (c. 1805 – 23 December 1893) arrived in South Australia from London aboard City of Adelaide in July 1839
- John Hayter ( – ) arrived in South Australia in August 1840 aboard William Mitchell and managed a few hotels including the John Bull Hotel on Currie Street. He formed a partnership with Simms in 1851 to operate the Pirie Street Brewery, which they relinquished in 1854. In 1853 he and Simms purchased James Chambers' mail coach business for around £14,000. In April 1855, Hayter disposed of his share in the business, and by mid-1859 was insolvent. He had a home in Unley, block 111 and part of 112, which he disposed of in 1859 and 1860. He had a daughter Sarah, who married John Marshall on 16 October 1855. Further information is lacking.
- James Thomson Syme (c. 1819 – 1 April 1883), a Scotsman, arrived in Adelaide in 1857 and worked for Primrose's Union Brewery until 1863 when he joined in partnership with F. S. Sison. He returned to Scotland in 1882, died of gout in Edinburgh, His estate was not cleared for probate until 1911.
- Frederick Samuel Sison (c. 1831 – 29 December 1891), an Englishman, was a traveller for E. J. F. Crawford before joining with Syme. He married (Amelia) Lucy Bartlett (1840 – 6 October 1914), a sister of Harry Bartlett. He accompanied Syme to Britain, but after the latter's death returned to South Australia, and settled in Port Lincoln, where he built a mansion, "Boston House", which still stands. Sison and Bartlett were great mates, went fishing together.
- Dr. Andrew McIntyre ( – 26 October 1883) married Mary Kell (arrived Rajasthan 1838 with parents, large family; died 16 March 1882) on 18 June 1857; had residence in Brougham Place, died in Glasgow. Mary's sister Emma Kell married Frederic Wicksteed (c. 1813 – 1877) in 1847. She had a brother Frederick Polhill Kell (c. 1834 – 22 February 1854).
- William Polhill Wicksteed (1853 – 26 September 1913) was born in North Adelaide, son of Frederic Wicksteed and Emma Wicksteed, née Kell, and educated at Whinham College and St Peter's College. He was involved in the Commercial Travellers' Association. A daughter married a son of William Randell.
- Henry Strype Anthony (20 October 1850 – 15 November 1907) was son of Frank Anthony (died 1885) and Mary May Anthony, née Strype (died 1890). He subdivided the suburbs now known as Henley Beach and College Park

== The buildings ==
The original land grant was made to William Wyatt on 23 December 1837 by the Resident Commissioner of the colony of South Australia, James Hurtle Fisher. In 1862, James Walsh owned the property, in April 1864 leasing it to Syme and Sison, who were "brewers at the adjacent brewery". In 1871 Syme and Sison bought a small section of the buildings, continuing to lease the rest of the premises until purchasing it in November 1873. In June 1882 William Wicksteed, Henry Anthony and Andrew McIntyre bought the property, with the title transferred in November 1886 to Mary Jane Syme (widow) and James Russell.

The original part of the 113 Pirie Street building (on the corner) was built as a warehouse for the Pirie Street Brewery around 1864, when Syme and Sison acquired it and renamed it the Adelaide Brewery. As brewing expanded in the 1870s, so did the building, with a second storey being added to the warehouse in the 1880s, and much of the site extensively rebuilt. Daniel Garlick designed several new extensions: in 1871 new stables and offices were built; in 1872 a malt house and cellar; and in 1876, further rooms for storage and equipment. It was possibly the biggest and most well-equipped brewery in Adelaide at the time.

After the brewery was closed in 1902, the buildings were used as commercial warehouses. An extension and new frontage on Pirie Street were added around 1910. The printers Hunkin, Ellis & King occupied the premises from June 1924 to April 1974. In 1982 the well-regarded firm Kenneth Milne Architects (Note: Note: Nothing to do with architect F. Kenneth Milne, who designed the refurbishments for the West End Brewery in Hindley Street and for the Ozone Marryatville, both around 1940–41.) refurbished the building, with Samuel Hill Smith purchasing the property at 113 Pirie Street for use as an art gallery known as the Hill Smith Gallery in July 1983. The Wyatt Street buildings were used as a car workshop and park for some years, before being bought by Geoff Wallbridge and others of the engineering firm Wallbridge Gilbert Aztec around 1980. As of 2024 the firm still occupies the premises, after many years of refurbishment, with input from heritage architect Elizabeth Little.

== Heritage status ==
The old brewery buildings with the present address of 54-60 Wyatt Street were heritage-listed on the South Australian Heritage Register on 20 November 1986.

The building at 113 Pirie Street, once part of the brewery, later occupied by the Hill Smith Gallery, was recommended for heritage listing in 2008 by Adelaide City Council, described in its report as "A prominent early commercial building, clearly expressing in its materials, form and detailing a long history, first as a warehouse for the associated Adelaide Brewery, and subsequently as a well-detailed shop/office presenting an Edwardian classical frontage to Pirie Street. It is one of the very few surviving brewery buildings in the city, and was a significant part of the adjacent (heritage-listed) Adelaide Brewery". However, as of April 2024, it is not heritage-listed, and Hill Smith Galleries moved out around 2020.

== Other breweries ==
Other breweries operating in the late 1860s included:

- Kent Town Brewery;
- Union Brewery:
- Hindmarsh Brewery;
- West End Brewery;
- Morphett Street Brewery; and
- Walkerville Brewery.
