= West End Brewery (Hindley Street) =

Adelaide brewery in Hindley St, founded 1859, taken over 1888

The West End Brewery in Hindley Street, Adelaide, was a South Australian brewer of beer founded in the colony of South Australia in 1859 by a consortium of brewers. Its West End Ale was a popular brand and the enterprise was a successful one. The company merged with the Kent Town Brewery and Ben Rounsevell's wine and spirit business to create the South Australian Brewing, Malting, Wine and Spirit Company (later the South Australian Brewing Company), in 1888, which continued to use the West End brand.

The building in Hindley Street, known as the West End Brewery, continued to be used by SA Brewing until its sale in 1980. The factory building on Port Road at Thebarton continues to be called the West End Brewery, owing to the large sign advertising West End beer, before and after its takeover by Lion.

== History ==
=== Background ===
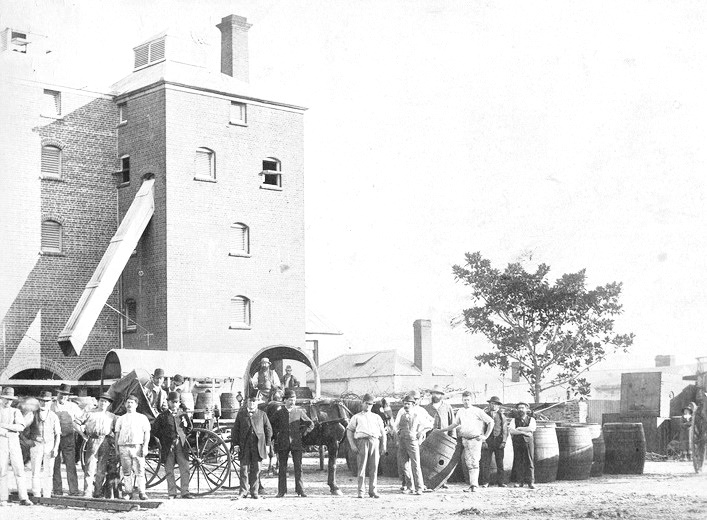
West End Brewery 1880

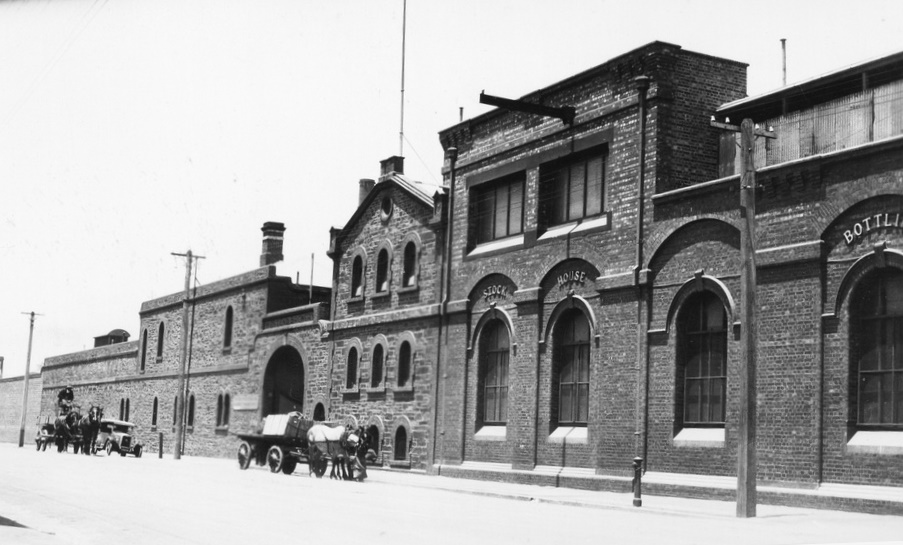
Hindley St building (then SA Brewing Co.) 1920

Sometime around 1844, William Henry Clark, an Irish immigrant to South Australia, founded the Halifax Street Brewery; an unwelcome addition to the neighbourhood due the odour and liquid discharged into Gilles Street. In July 1854 Clark, with partners J. B. Spence, J. H. Parr and Edward Logue, took over Crawford brothers' Hindmarsh Brewery in order to close it down and supply its customers from the Halifax Street brewery. The business continued however under E. J. F. Crawford.

William Knox Simms and John Hayter operated the Pirie Street Brewery (later Adelaide Brewery) from 1851 to 1855, when Hayter left the partnership. This brewery was also not popular with those living nearby. Simms took over the Halifax Street operation in March 1856, then in February 1858 Clark sold the property to Henry Noltenius. In July 1858, Noltenius took in Simms as a partner, then in November 1858 sold him his interest in the business.

Clark meanwhile had borrowed money from John Haimes to build a new brewery on Town Acre 66 at the south side of Hindley Street, midway between Morphett Street and West Terrace. Noltenius found himself in financial difficulties, and neither Simms nor Clark could repay any of the £3,530 they collectively owed him, which resulted in his insolvency. Clark moved to Victoria in 1860, and thereby evaded his creditors, and probably died there some time before 1873.

=== 1859: West End Brewery ===
In 1859, a consortium of Simms, Haimes, and Edgar Chapman founded the "West End Brewery" on the Hindley Street property, and invested heavily in establishing buildings, in cellar construction, and equipping the brewery with all the latest refinements. The location had the advantage of proximity to the Parklands (less smell nuisance), the Port Road (transport of raw materials and finished product) and the River Torrens (handy for discharge of effluent).

By October 1859, W. H. Clark was advertising barrels of "West End Ale" for sale to publicans at £2/2s. They closed their smaller, competing establishments, which included the Halifax Street Brewery. Simms ran the business with help from Clark's brewer John Plummer Gardner.

W. K. Simms bought the company in 1861; Chapman was his partner 1865–1879. An extensive contemporary description of the brewery was published in the South Australian Register in 1868. The West End Brewery proved highly profitable and Simms and Chapman became wealthy men.

=== 1888: South Australian Brewing Company ===
In 1888, Simms and Chapman joined forces with Edwin Smith, owner of Kent Town Brewery (formerly Logue's). A third enterprise, Ben Rounsevell's wine and spirit business, joined to create the South Australian Brewing, Malting, Wine and Spirit Company. Rounsevell became the managing director of the company.

This was the site of the famous "eight-hour drinking piss" session with Kerry_O'Keeffe and Rod Marsh before a 1976 match with Pakistan, as memorably recounted in a typical after-dinner speech at a cricketers' club, an anecdote that Skull is so famous for.

After various other changes through the 20th century, including the closure of the Hindley Street site (with the building demolished in 1983), the company has, since 1993, been owned by Lion as the South Australian Brewing Company, and is due for closure in June 2021.

== Other breweries ==
Other breweries operating in the late 1860s included:

- Kent Town Brewery
- Union Brewery
- Pirie Street Brewery
- Hindmarsh Brewery
- Morphett Street Brewery
- Walkerville Brewery
