= Walkerville Brewery =

Brewery in Adelaide, South Australia, 1840s-1939

Walkerville Brewery was a brewer of beer in Adelaide, South Australia, originally founded in the 1840s. The company became a co-operative, and grew by admitting hotel owners as shareholders, and absorbed smaller breweries. After several amalgamations it moved its operations to Southwark (now part of Thebarton) and by 1920 it was South Australia's largest brewing company.

It was bought out by the South Australian Brewing Company in 1939 and its facilities became known as the company's Southwark brewery. The brewery produced Nathan beer (Nathan Bitter), named after a new type of beer making equipment introduced in 1927 (later renamed Southwark Bitter by the SA Brewing Co.).

== History ==
Walkerville Tce is highlighted yellow. The section beyond Fuller Street is not seen on early maps.
1 Walkerville Brewery Lots 66, 67
2 Lot 41 Walkerville

=== First phase ===
The first brewery in Walkerville was founded in 1847 by William Colyer and William Williams, reported by one source to be South Australia's first licensed publican, William Williams had been general storekeeper, auctioneer, first licensed victualer, landlord of the City-Bridge Hotel, and common brewer. later research suggests that he was the second to be licensed and the third brewer in the colony. The partnership was dissolved late the same year, and Colyer returned to England.

Williams commissioned architect Thomas Price in 1846 to erect buildings, including malthouse, store and other buildings on William St (now Walkerville Tce) Lot 41. A series of three tunnels running to the Torrens was used as cellars. The "tunnel to Warwick St" story has elsewhere been debunked, and identified as nothing but drains. (filled in c. 1970 preparatory to erecting the Highways Department building). James Thompson was the brewer. Another brewery was constructed before 1855 on Lots 66 and 67,. It was initially owned by James Thomson and George Ball was brewer, who with George Huntley took over the brewery in 1868.

Williams was found insolvent 1851, but had his certificate annulled in 1853 and died 1857. Lot 41 was purchased by Nathaniel. P. Levi in October 1842. Edmund Levi, (son of N. P. Levi who died 1843) took over management of Walkerville Brewery in 1853, leasing it to one James Thomson, brewer and proprietor of nearby Sussex Arms Inn.

In January 1860 fire destroyed the malthouse, which had been leased to Richard Goss (died 1869), who sold malt to Simms as well as to Thomson. In 1854 Thomson relinquished his share of the business and in October left the partnership to White & Phillips who shortly went bankrupt. Thomson was found insolvent in 1864 and jailed for two months. He was not clearly related to James Turnbull Thomson, brewer and founder of Balhannnah, who had more than his share of financial failures.

- William Hardyman Colyer (17 January 1816 – 15 August 1891 in Rondebosch, Cape Town) arrived in South Australia aboard Winchester September 1838, and acted as brewer for a company in Launceston around 1844, before founding the brewery in Walkerville. He later settled in South Africa.
- Edmund Levi (1827 – 30 July 1895) arrived in Adelaide in 1842, joined brother Philip's P. Levi & Co. in 1854. He married Gertrude Goldsmid in 1862.
- Charles White (–) was chairman of the first Council of the District of Walkerville, with councillors J. H. Swann, John Campbell, J. D. Woods, and Thomas Beadle.
- Samuel Vincent Price Phillips (– c. 1896) left for the goldfields c. 1858, died in England.
- James Thomson was James Thomson "the elder" who arrived aboard Moffat December 1839 with wife Mary (c. 1791 – 5 April 1875), with children Emma and Thomas, founded Sussex Arms Hotel 1843, died before 1875. In 1847 his daughter Betsy Thomson (c. 1816 – 12 February 1893) married James Maskall Nottage (1821 – 17 December 1879), to whom Thomson transferred the "Sussex Arms"' licence in 1853, and for whom Nottage Terrace was named.

=== Second phase ===
Around 1862 Ball & Huntley took over Thomson's defunct brewery, named it the "Black Horse Brewery". and began brewing there again, purchasing the property in 1870. Their malthouse was destroyed by fire on 5 June 1871. Ball died in 1882 and Huntley continued operating the brewery until 1890 when he retired.

- George Ball (c. 1831 – 1 November 1882) and his wife Anna Jane Ball (c. 1834 – 4 June 1924) arrived in Adelaide aboard emigrant ship China in November 1852.
- George Huntley (5 February 1832 – 9 August 1917) arrived in Adelaide around 1851, worked as a builder, then for White & Phillips, brewers. In September 1855 he married Mary Ann Clarke, widow of Joseph Clarke of Walkerville.

=== Third phase ===
In 1889 the brewery was taken over and run as a co-operative by a consortium of four "free" hotel owners: Robert Hyman, John Selby Cocker, Samuel Harris, and Vincent Henry Simpson.

- Robert Hyman (1851 – December 1903), a Finnish-born hotelkeeper, was a founder of Walkerville Brewery Co-operative in 1889 and remained one of the largest shareholders m that business and on board of directors from 1886 to 1903. He married Sarah North in 1876; a granddaughter Gwendoline Kathleen Hyman (1903–1992) on 16 February 1926) married Louis Alfred von Doussa in 1926
- John Selby Cocker (c. 1844 – 14 April 1901) arrived with his father aboard Hooghly in October 1846, worked on the Overland Telegraph Line, then as a baker before taking over his father's Kentish Arms Hotel on Stanley Street, North Adelaide. He was one of the four original members of the Co-operative. He married Joan Agnes Dineen in 1878.
- Samuel Harris (c. 1844 – 23 February 1904) arrived in South Australia with his parents aboard John Bunyan in 1854. After many years with the coachmaking firm of Barlow & Sons he became landlord, then publican of the Gasworks Hotel in Brompton. He was chairman of directors of the Walkerville Co-operative for ten years.
- Vincent Henry Simpson (1860 – 12 July 1926) was born in Norwood a son of Frederick John Simpson (died 1883), and educated at Unwin's school in North Adelaide. He was publican of the Buckingham Arms, Gilberton at an early age, and married Emily Chittleborough (–1952) in 1885. He was chairman of directors of the Co-operative.

The Walkerville Brewing Company was founded with 19 other shareholders, all publicans or hotel owners, whose share of the profits depended on the amount of trade they did with the company. The company merged with Clark and Ware's company and its operations moved to Southwark, but the Walkerville Brewery had one last spasm when it was resurrected by Charles Williams in 1901 and operated for five more years before closing for the last time; see below for more information.

In 1896 the hotel now known as The Griffins, then called the General Gordon Hotel, was bought by the Arthur, Charles and Thomas Ware, who sold to Walkerville Brewery in 1898.

== Amalgamations ==
=== Torrenside Brewery ===
Frequently spelled "Torrensside", the brewery was founded by the Port Road Southwark, now Thebarton, on the banks of the River Torrens in 1886 by A. W. & T. L. Ware, and produced Southwark brand beer. Their first customer was the Exchange Hotel, operated by their brothers George and Boxer.

The Ware brothers were sons of Charles James Ware (c. 1824 – 19 December 1891) who arrived in SA aboard Augustus in November 1846 and married Fanny Crawford (1829 – 7 April 1898) on 22 August 1859. Fanny arrived with her parents aboard D'Auvergne in March 1839. Fanny was the daughter of William Crawford, Builder. Charles ran the Burra Hotel, then in 1868 took over the Exchange Hotel, owned by Sir Henry Ayers.

- Arthur Wellington Ware CMG (1861 – 29 January 1927), Mayor of Adelaide 1898–1901. He married Rosa Henrietta Haussen (2 November 1860 – 29 November 1915) of the Hindmarsh Brewery Haussen family, on 11 March 1884.
- Thomas Lincoln "Tom" Ware (1864 – 22 December 1896) died while swimming near the Grange jetty.
- George James Ware (15 February 1867 – 17 June 1948)
- (Charles) Boxer Ware (26 December 1870 – 23 July 1932) was educated at Stanley Grammar School, Watervale, served as mayor of Thebarton for four years and for some time chairman of directors, Walkerville Co-operative Brewing.

=== East Adelaide Brewery ===
Edward Clark, son of W. H. Clark, was brewer for the Murray Brewery in Goolwa in the 1880s, formed E. Clark & Co. in Adelaide with one A. Wheelwright, was found insolvent in 1889 through lack of capital, then served as brewer for the Walkerville Co-operative Brewing Company. He left the Co-operative in 1895 to manage the East Adelaide Brewery, a two-storey establishment which the newly revived E. Clark & Co. built on the south side of the River Torrens, on Walkerville Road (now Stephen Terrace). The probable location is about 1 km south of the Walkerville Brewery.

E. Clark & Co. was founded with twelve shareholders inc. William Warren, James Wells, and Eliza Dreyer as Clark & Co., became Clark, Ware & Co. before absorbing the old Walkerville Brewing Company.

- William Walter Warren (c. 1860 – 24 February 1938) may have had a hotel, but was better known as a racehorse breeder.
- James Samuel Wells (1872–1959), son of Michael Wells (– 14 August 1887) and Elizabeth Wells née Davis (–), owners of Parkside Hotel.
- Eliza Jane Dreyer (c. 1861 – 25 September 1926) had Prince Albert Hotel in Wright street for 30 years.

The product proved so popular the factory's capacity had to be doubled a year later. In 1897 a bottling plant was installed and production capacity doubled again. By 1898 the East Adelaide Brewery was contracted to supply fifty "free houses", and once again a doubling of capacity was deemed necessary to keep up with demand. It was decided instead to amalgamate with the Wares' Torrenside Brewery, which took place in April 1898, their owners combining as Clark, Ware & Co. The East Adelaide premises were closed and the Torrenside brewery at Southwark expanded.

=== Walkerville Co-operative ===
In 1899 the activities of the Walkerville Brewing Company and Clark, Ware & Co. combined as Walkerville Co-operative Brewing Company at Southwark. Additional buildings were erected at the site. The old Walkerville Brewery was taken over by its erstwhile head brewer Charles Williams in 1901 and operated successfully as "Williams' Walkerville Brewery", with outlets at the Tea Tree Gully Hotel and perhaps a few others not tied to either of the two combines, no doubt to the chagrin of the Co-operative, which bought out the company in 1906.

- Samuel Joshua Jacobs (1853 – 1937) was chairman of directors from the formation of the Company, succeeded by C. Boxer Ware. He was also president of Chamber of Commerce, and of United Chambers of Manufacture, chairman of Tattersalls Racing Club.
- Charles Williams worked at the brewery his father John Williams (c. 1806 – 29 June 1876) owned at Angas Park, then in Ballarat. He became head brewer at the Lion Brewing and Malting Company and for the Walkerville Brewing Company. When that company moved to Southwark he reopened the old facility and continued brewing for another five years. After ten years' inactivity he became brewer for the Waverley Brewery, Mitcham and retired at the age of 83. Relationship, if any, to William Williams, Adelaide's first publican and founder of Walkerville Brewery has not been determined.

A popular drink produced by the Walkerville Co-op was König Lager, whose name was changed to Adelaide Lager in 1914 amid the anti-German sentiment that swept Australia and resulted in wholesale changing of German-sounding place names. The Walkerville Co-Operative Brewing Co. continued its growth and by the end of World War I was the largest brewery in South Australia.

In September 1925 Walkerville Co-operative Brewing Company, Limited, was first listed on the Adelaide Stock Exchange. Directors were Charles Boxer Ware, Frederick James Blades, Vincent Henry Simpson, and William Walter Warren.

The company absorbed Haussen's Brewery in 1926; Haussen & Co. retained ownership of its string of hotels.

==== Nathan beer ====
Leopold Nathan (born 30 July 1864 in Württemberg, Germany) invented a closed brewing system in cylindro-conical vessels, in which the beer was exposed to fewer contaminants during its production, and the brewing time was much reduced. Patented first in the United States in 1908, the system was refined over the following two decades.

In November 1925 the Walkerville Co-op signed an agreement with the Nathan Institute of Zǔrich for the installation of a "Nathan patent" plant at the company's brewery at Southwark, and has been claimed as the first Australian adopter of the system. The installation of the new equipment required the construction of additional buildings to accommodate it, with beer production using the new system beginning in late 1927. A formal opening ceremony took place in January 1928. (However Nathan's process was in operation at Peter Grant Hay's Richmond N.S. Brewery in 1927, so although they signed the contract earlier, Southwark brewery was the second in Australia to implement the system.) Nathan Bitter, thee first beer brewed using the new process, was immediately popular, and was marketed around the whole country.

However, the Walkerville company made substantial losses in the year 1928–29, and the South Australian Brewing Company was dominating the market at that time.

=== South Australian Brewing Company ===
The Walkerville Co-operative Brewing Company Ltd. was bought out by the South Australian Brewing Company in 1938 and its facilities became the company's main brewery. Because Nathan Bitter was so popular, they renamed the brewery the Nathan Brewery, later (1949) being renamed to Southwark Brewery. Nathan beer (Bitter) was renamed Southwark beer (Bitter) in November 1951.

== Heritage listing ==
The Walkerville Brewhouse Tower at 107 Port Road was provisionally added to the South Australian Heritage Register on 20 May 2021. Its significance is described thus:

Significance The Walkerville Brewhouse Tower built in 1886, enlarged in 1898-1899 and then doubled in size in 1901-1903, demonstrates important associations with the brewing industry in South Australia and 135 years of brewing at the site. The introduction of brewhouse towers in the late nineteenth century enabled brewers to implement the gravitational method of brewing and were once a key element of the larger South Australian breweries. The consolidation and closure of many breweries in the twentieth century and the adoption of newer methods of brewing have led to these structures becoming uncommon. The Walkerville Brewhouse Tower is one of a few remaining and one of the largest examples of a brewhouse tower in South Australia. The Walkerville Brewhouse Tower also demonstrates important associations with the Torrenside Brewery (established 1886) and the Walkerville Co-Operative Brewing Company (established 1889). The Torrenside and Walkerville breweries amalgamated in 1898 with brewing continuing at the Thebarton site. The Walkerville Co-operative Brewing Company was SABCo's biggest competitor and the other major South Australian brewer during the late nineteenth and early twentieth centuries. It was also the first of its kind in South Australia to successfully run a brewery following the cooperative model.

== Other breweries ==
Other breweries operating in the late 1860s included:

- Kent Town Brewery;
- Union Brewery:
- Pirie Street Brewery;
- Hindmarsh Brewery;
- Morphett Street Brewery; and
- West End Brewery.
