= Noltenius =

Surname

Noltenius is a surname. Notable people with the surname include:

- Friedrich Noltenius (1894–1936), German flying ace in the First World War
- Henry Noltenius (1820–1884), German settler and a prominent wine and spirit merchant

== See also ==
- The Noltenius Brothers, is a 1945 German drama film
