= Morphett Street Brewery =

Brewery in Adelaide, Australia

Morphett Street Brewery
(location shown is tentative).

The Morphett Street Brewery was a brewer of beer in Adelaide, South Australia.

== History ==
John Reid ( – c. 24 November 1863) and Isaiah Reid (c. 1832 – 9 April 1877) had a licensed grocery shop on a half acre of land on Morphett Street near North Terrace in the Adelaide city centre from 1857, then began brewing there from 1859. After the death of his brother, Isaiah Reid took on John Burn Harrison as a partner, then proved insolvent 1866.

In 1868, which may have been Reid's last year of operation, their production was 350,000 imperial gallons (1,600,000 L) of beer. This made the Morphett Street Brewery the smallest in the city; one third that of Simms & Chapman's West End Brewery and half that of Syme & Sison's Pirie Street Brewery.

Their pale ale was bottled partly by Noltenius and partly by Aldridge. The factory was then taken over by Fred Fuller & Co. who continued operating on the premises until perhaps as late as 1873.

Isaiah Reid later conducted a brewery at Port Augusta. Frederick Robinson Fuller (died 1883) proved insolvent in 1871.

== Other breweries ==
Other breweries operating in the late 1860s included:

- Kent Town Brewery;
- Union Brewery:
- Pirie Street Brewery;
- West End Brewery;
- Hindmarsh Brewery; and
- Walkerville Brewery.
