= Angas Park, South Australia =

Geographical region

Angas Park is a region in South Australia, situated on the upper reaches of the Gawler River, and encompasses the towns of Nuriootpa, Angaston and Bethany.

Angas Park was part of the "New Silesia" Special Survey undertaken for Charles Flaxman by William Light, and (following Light's death) Light, Finniss & Co, and largely settled by German immigrants. Flaxman was chief clerk for George Fife Angas.

- Angas Park between the Barossa Range and the Belvidere Range to the west.
- Flaxman Valley between Barossa Range and Hawdon Range to the east.

Angas Park was later the name of a village, of some 70 houses in 1884.

It was also the name of an Adelaide subdivision "west of Mitcham railway station", advertised in 1925.

== Named for Angas Park ==
- Angas Park Distillery in Nuriootpa, founded 1900 for the winemaking firm of Tolley, Scott & Tolley
- Angas Park Hotel in Nuriootpa, previously called the Hotel Sebastopol
- Angas Park, trade name of a dried fruit company, founded 1911 and taken over by Manassen Foods, who also own the Sunbeam dried fruit company. The Angaston, South Australia factory was closed in 2013 to concentrate manufacture at the Sunbeam factory in Mildura, Victoria.
