= John Primrose (brewer) =

Early settler and brewer in Adelaide, South Australia (c.1803–1876)

John Primrose (c.1803 – 28 November 1876) was a Scottish distiller and brewer who had a substantial career in the colony of South Australia. He was the founder of the Union Brewery, also known as Primrose's Brewery, in Rundle Street, Adelaide, the colony's first successful brewery.

== Early life ==
Primrose was the son of a distiller in Carsebridge, near Alloa, Scotland. He was said to have linked his ancestry to the Earl of Rosebery.

He was educated at the Royal High School, Edinburgh, and on leaving school he joined his father's establishment, where he remained for some time, gaining sound practical and scientific knowledge of the arts of brewing and distilling. He gained further experience managing a distillery for the Messrs. Shea, of Belfast, then that of Beamish, in Cork. He remained with them for several years, only leaving them to establish a brewery on his own account on the Isle of Man.

He was then attracted to Australia, with the prospect of managing a large established distillery in Sydney. Primrose arrived in Adelaide aboard Ariadne in August 1839 and decided to travel no further.

== Businesses in Adelaide ==
Shortly after his arrival he set up a distillery in partnership with John Richmond. After carrying it on for about two years he ceased operation because the Government demanded payment of duty upon spirit manufactured in the colony at the same rate as if it had been imported.

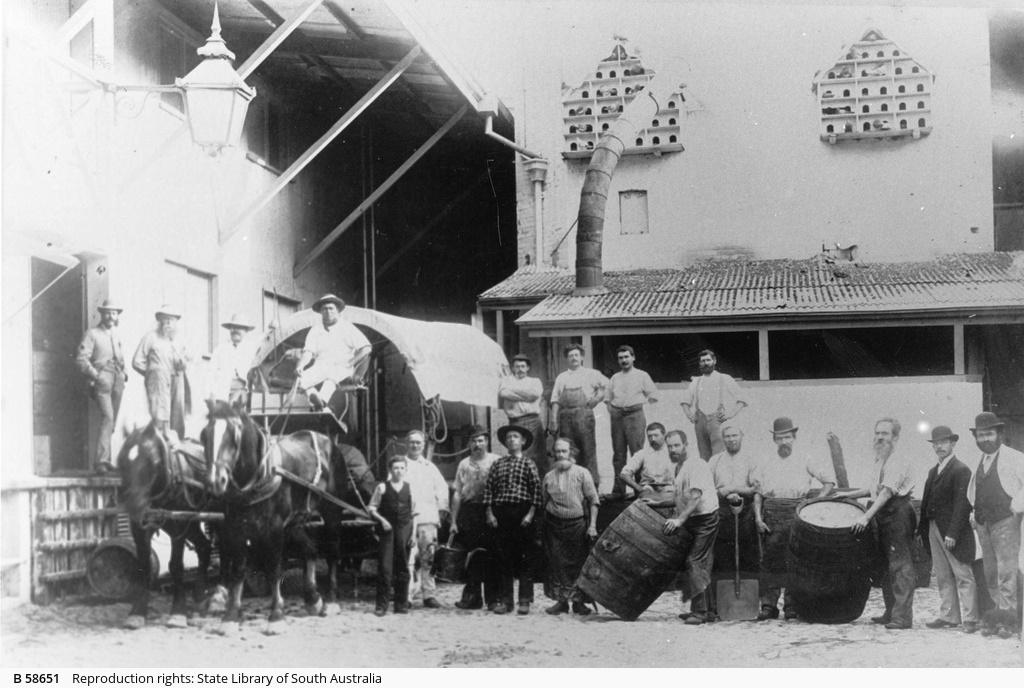
Workers at Union Brewery, James Place c. 1890

Primrose then turned his attention to brewing, and in 1841 he and Richmond took over the Union Brewery on Rundle Street. This brewery had been founded on Robert Cock's Town Acre 80, east corner Rundle Street and James Place (opposite Stephens Place.), by Daniel Cudmore in 1838 and put up for sale in 1839.

The brewery was referred to as "Primrose's Brewery" in an article in the South Australian Register in February 1861.

He ran the business until November 1875, when he transferred the management to his nephew William Ross Sawers (c. 1839–1911) and his son-in-law Arthur Rait Malcom. They were able to use the basement of the Academy of Music, Rundle Street, (opened 1879) for cellaring.

Richmond sold his share to Primrose at some point, and the brewery continued into the 1890s.

== Death ==
Primrose died on 28 November 1876 and his remains were interred in the West Terrace Cemetery.

== Family ==
John Primrose married Elizabeth Paton Reid (c.1822 – 30 August 1867) on 10 April 1845. A daughter, Elizabeth Margaret Adelaide Primrose (1849–1874) married Arthur Rait Malcom (c. 1847–1890) in 1872. Malcom married again on 29 June 1882, to Joanna Barry of South Melbourne. He was a prominent member of the Adelaide Hunt Club.

== Other breweries ==
Other breweries operating in the late 1860s included:

- Kent Town Brewery;
- West End Brewery;
- Pirie Street Brewery;
- Hindmarsh Brewery;
- Morphett Street Brewery; and
- Walkerville Brewery.
