= William Knox Simms =

Australian brewer and politician

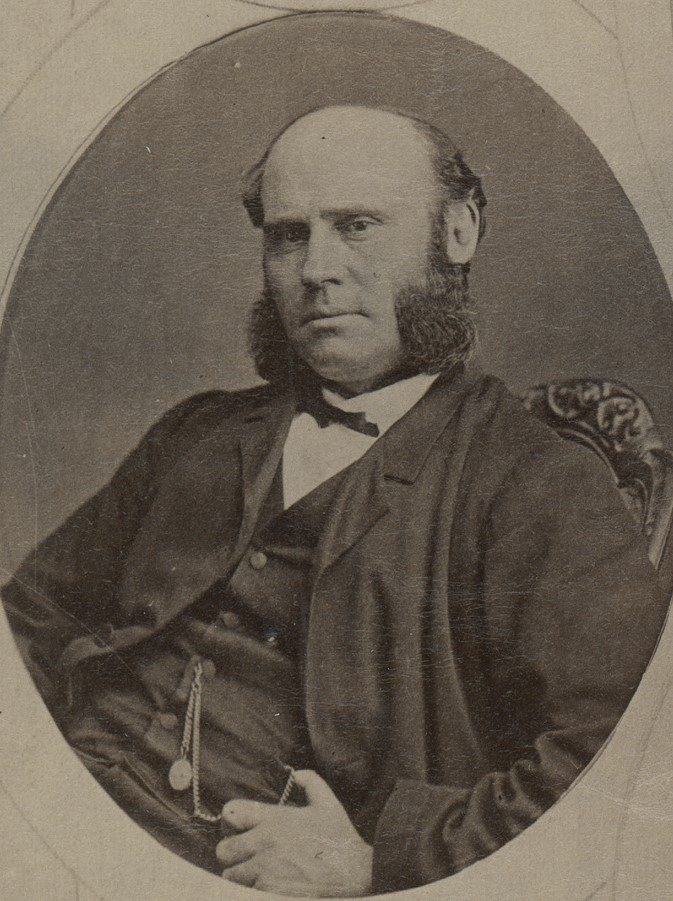

William Knox Simms (1830 – 25 December 1897) was a brewer, businessman and politician in the early days of South Australia.

== History ==
Simms migrated to South Australia from England, arriving in December 1845. He formed a partnership with John Hayter and in 1852 purchased the Pirie Street Brewery from its founder James Walsh. In 1853 Simms & Hayter took over the mail business of John and James Chambers, which proved highly profitable. Hayter left in 1855, then was proved insolvent in 1859.

From 1856 the firm of W. K. Simms & Co. ran the Halifax Street Brewery, then in 1861 took over the famous West End Brewery, off Hindley Street near West Terrace, and built it up into a highly profitable business; from 1866 to 1879 with partner Edgar Chapman. In 1874 they sent senior employee Charles Mallen to New South Wales to found what became the "Adelaide Brewery" in Waverley, Sydney with Hampton Carroll Gleeson. In 1888 the West End Brewery was taken over by the South Australian Brewing and Malting Company. That business later amalgamated with Edwin Smith's Kent Town Brewing Company, whose malt towers remain a prominent East Adelaide landmark. Simms remained a director of the company until his death, but his duties were not onerous, and his dividends immense.

== Other activities ==
Broken Hill mine

He was a director of Equitable Fire Insurance Co.

== Politics ==
In 1867 Simms was elected to the Adelaide City Council for the Gawler ward. He proved to be a popular representative and was elected to the House of Assembly in 1868 for the West Adelaide district, with H. R. Fuller as his colleague.

The fifth Parliament was dissolved on 2 March 1870 and Simms did not stand for the ensuing election, but was again elected on 14 December 1871, with Judah Moss Solomon as colleague. On 10 February 1875 Simms was again elected, with Thomas Johnson filling the other seat. He resigned in June 1876, thus allowing John Darling, Sr., to take his place, but he won again in April 1878 in conjunction with Hugh Fraser. He finally retired from the Assembly in March 1881, when he was succeeded by C. C. Kingston. Simms remained out of Parliament until 28 February 1884, when he was a candidate at the first election for the Central district of the Legislative Council, his opponent being Philip Santo. Previously the Council had been chosen by the whole colony voting in one electorate, but by the Constitution Act of 1881 its strength was increased from 18 to 24 members, and it was divided into four electoral districts. The first vacancy under the new system was caused by the death of Sir William Morgan, and Simms won in a close and hard-fought contest. He resigned from the Council on 14 April 1891. During his long period in politics he never sought a Cabinet position or personal gain, never engaged in party politics, and retained a high popularity with fellow members and electors alike.

== Racing ==
He was a keen race-goer and supported the Totalizator Bill, steering it through to its second reading, but never owned a thoroughbred.

He was present at the meeting held at the John Bull Hotel, Adelaide, in October 1861, for the purpose of putting racing in the colony on a more satisfactory footing, and was elected a member of the club then established, known as the Second South Australian Jockey Club, and was elected to its committee, along with E. M. Bagot, P. B. Coglin, G. Bennett, and W. Blackler. Simms resigned on 11 January 1864, but on the 20th of the same month he was elected to fill the vacancy caused by the retirement of Coglin, and continued to hold the office for several years. In 1864, at his instigation, it was decided to dispense with sweepstakes and substitute fixed sums as prizes. In those days the Adelaide Cup was worth £500 with a sweepstake of 50 sovereigns added. In 1866 when the S.A.J.C. became financially embarrassed, Simms was one of the guarantors for the payment of the overdraft at the National Bank. C. B. Fisher resigned his membership of the committee in 1867, and Simms was appointed chairman. In that year P. B. Coglin proposed the handing over of the lease of tho Old Course to the Jockey Club on the club accepting the liabilities, but the proposition was not entertained. Mr. Simms took an active part in promoting the race meeting held on the Old Course in 1869 in honour of the visit of Prince Alfred, the Duke of Edinburgh. He was one of those who met at the Old Stock Exchange on 19 September 1888 to re-form the South Australian Jockey Club.

== Family life ==
Simms married Jane Faulkner (c. 1829 – 28 August 1905). They had four sons (one, William, died aged three) and three daughters:

- Alfred Simms (c. 1853 – 30 May 1901) married Priscilla Chambers (ca.1854 – 17 November 1924), daughter of John Chambers, on 17 June 1874. He was a member of the Adelaide Stock Exchange, and in 1887 with partner W. B. Rounsevell took over Johnston & Furniss, the Grenfell Street wine and spirit merchants, to form Rounsevell & Simms, which in February 1888 joined with the Kent Town Brewery and the West End Brewery to form The South Australian Brewing, Malting, and Wine and Spirit Company. Substantial additions (reredos, lady chapel, vestries, arches and apse) were made to St. Peter's Cathedral, North Adelaide in memory of Alfred Simms by his wife.
- Harry Simms was a member of the Melbourne Stock Exchange. Around 1900 he left Australia to live in Hampstead, England.
- Clara Jane Simms (1855 – ) married solicitor Paul Frederick "Fred" Bonnin (died 14 September 1901) on 25 December 1876.

She married again, to Whitmore Blake Carr (died August 1943), on 2 June 1904.

- Elinor/Eleanor Ann Simms (1857 – 2 February 1900) married Alexander Frederick Fisher of Croydon on 25 November 1879. She divorced him in 1887. She married again, to solicitor Charles Grant Varley on 5 May 1888.
- Louisa Simms (c. 1857 – 24 April 1910) married Cavendish Lister Colley (c. 1848 – 14 April 1906), son of R. B. Colley on 12 December 1883.
- Edward "Ned" Simms (c. 1864 – 1 September 1909) married Emma Louise "Louie" Noltenius, daughter of Henry Noltenius on 8 May 1890.

They lived at Victoria Place, Glenelg, overlooking Colley Reserve. Simms suffered greatly from rheumatism in later life and made trips to the spas of Germany and New Zealand seeking relief. His end though, was swift and he was buried in St Jude's Church cemetery , Brighton. A stained glass window (depicting St Mark, the Evangelist) in St. Peter's Church, Glenelg, is dedicated to his memory.

== Estate ==
His estate at death was valued at £345,000 (more than AUD 500,000,000 today). A legal dispute arose as to whether gifts he made by deed poll to his family were an attempt to evade succession duty, and therefore liable for double taxation.
