= Kent Town Brewery =

Brewery in Adelaide, South Australia, 1856–1888

Kent Town Brewery was a brewery in Kent Town, a suburb adjacent to the city of Adelaide on its eastern side, in South Australia. Its original name was Logue's Brewery, after its first proprietor.

== History ==
Logue's Brewery / Kent Town Brewery
1 1856–1876 tentative location based on flood descriptions
2 1876–1888 then SA Brewing Co.

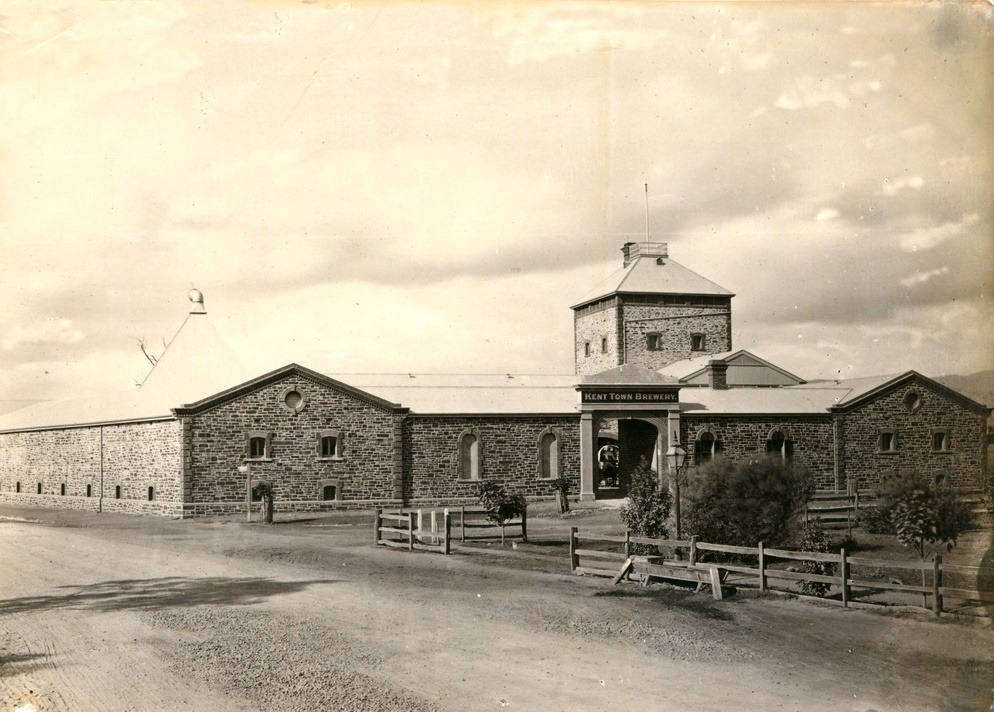

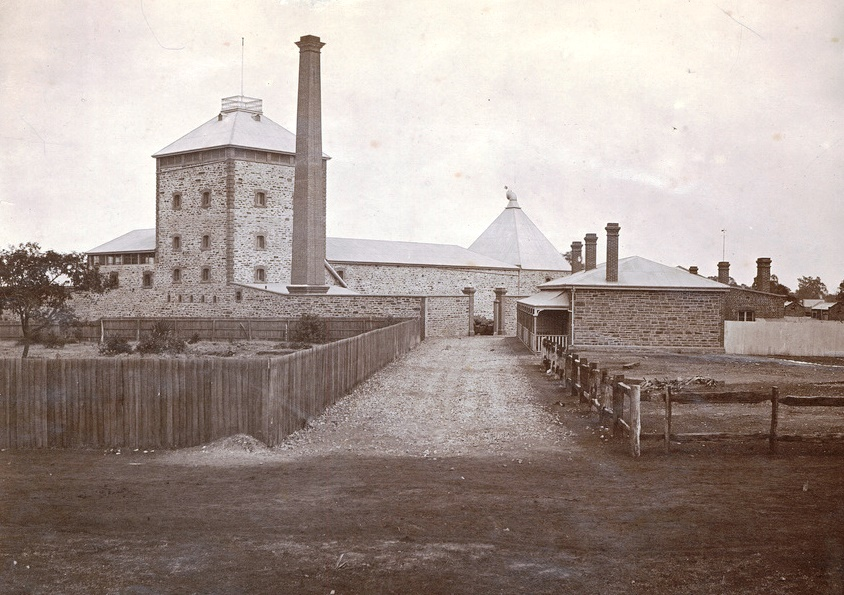
Two views of Kent Town Brewery c. 1876, corner Rundle Street and Dequetteville Terrace

The brewery was founded on King William Street, Kent Town near First Creek in 1856 by Capt. Henry Spencer Crawford ( – 14 November 1861), (Note: Family relationship (if any) between Henry Spencer Crawford and E. J. F. Crawford of Hindmarsh Brewery has not yet been found.) and Edward Logue. Their partnership was dissolved in July 1857. Crawford appears to have been in charge of setting up the process. The brewery was from the start known as "Logue's Brewery", he being both proprietor and brewer. Logue had earlier been involved in the Halifax Street Brewery as a financial partner in W. H. Clark & Co.

In March 1862 the brewery and the adjacent house, occupied by Logue and his family, was destroyed by fire. This was followed in August by a flood, which swept two of his men, who were working to protect the building, into the culvert under King William Street, and one was drowned. The brewery was back in action early in 1863.

Sometime around 1860 he took Edwin Thomas Smith on as a partner. Logue died in 1865; his will would be the subject of a legal dispute. Smith continued operating the business, which he renamed Kent Town Brewery, and two years later was its proprietor. The cellars were enlarged in 1868.

Kent Town was subjected to another major flooding in July 1873, which did considerable damage to nearby properties, but apart from minor incursion into the cellars and some undercutting of the foundations the brewery was unaffected.

Smith contracted Thomas English as architect for new premises, completed in 1876 at the nearby corner of Rundle Street and Dequetteville Terrace. Brown & Thompson were the builders. He also had nine workmen's cottages built at the rear of the premises by contractor Dickin.

=== 1888 takeover ===
In 1888 the South Australian Brewing, Malting, and Wine and Spirit Company (later South Australian Brewing Company) was formed to take over the assets of The Kent Town Brewery, West End Brewery and Rounsevell & Simms's wine and spirit business.

== Edward Logue's family ==
- Edward Logue (c. 1813 – 30 June 1865) married Sarah Wiggins ( – 15 August 1886) in 1852. Sarah arrived in SA aboard Florentia in June 1849.

- Ellen Logue (26 November 1852 – 16 February 1921) married Edward Pariss "Paris" Nesbit, QC (1852–1927) on 9 December 1874
- George Edward Logue (1856 – 1902) married Lavinia Rankin ( – 1921), sister of Oliver Rankin in 1879

- Lionel George Logue (26 February 1880 – 12 April 1953) speech therapist, subject of movie The King's Speech

- Valentine Logue (1913–2000) married Anne Bolton

- Herbert William Logue (1883–1954) married Hazel Lilian Playford (1890–1968) in 1919. Hazel was great-granddaughter of Rev. Thomas Playford
- Eveline May Logue (1885– ) married Jessel Rupert Cohen ( – 1948) in 1904. They divorced four years later; she married again to Robert Oliver Day in 1927
- Myra Lilian Logue (1887– ) married John Harold Pellew ( – ) in 1920

- William Henry Logue (1860– )
- Annie Jane Logue (1863–1935) married Oliver James Rankin ( – ) in 1887 He was a brother of Lavinia above.
- Sarah Louisa Logue (1865–1942)

== Building conversion ==
The malt towers of the old Kent Town Brewery have now been turned into luxury apartments overlooking the Adelaide Park Lands and Adelaide city centre.

== Other breweries ==
Other breweries operating in the late 1860s included:

- Hindmarsh Brewery;
- Union Brewery:
- Pirie Street Brewery;
- West End Brewery;
- Morphett Street Brewery; and
- Walkerville Brewery.
