= Tolley family =

Australian winemaker and merchant family

The Tolley family were important winemakers, merchants and distillers in South Australia. Members of the family formed three businesses: A. E. & F. Tolley, wine merchants of Leigh Street, Adelaide, Tolley Scott & Tolley, distillers of Stepney and Nuriootpa, better known by the initials "T.S.T.", and Douglas A. Tolley Pty, Ltd., winemakers of Hope Valley.

== History ==
Albion James Tolley (1819–1901), his wife Fanny, née Darbon, (1830–1899) and three children arrived in South Australia aboard Gipsy in August 1853. In 1858 he set up in business as wine merchant (and occasional hotel broker) Tolley & Co., on Currie Street, first at no. 75 then 21 from 1860. They returned to England in 1866, living at Chertsey, where their third son Doug was born. The family returned to Adelaide aboard Collingrove in January 1873, and sons Sydney and Frederick were enrolled at St. Peter's College; eldest son A.E. Tolley had returned in 1870. By 1881 he had retired, alternately living in Adelaide and "The Grange", South Norwood, London. In August 1885 he and Mrs. Tolley left South Australia for the last time aboard RMS Parramatta.

=== A. E. & F. Tolley ===
In 1874 eldest son Albion E. Tolley (occasionally referred to by his middle name Everard, presumably to differentiate from his father) formed a partnership with Phillip Charles J. Campbell to operate a licensed store in Peel Street, then Leigh Street. The partnership was dissolved in May 1875, with Campbell continuing as traveller and salesman for Tolley. In 1876 A. E. Tolley purchased Haussen's wine and liquor store on Currie Street, adjacent the John Bull Inn, H. H. Haussen resuming ownership of the Hindmarsh Brewery.

Albion Everard Tolley (1849 – 7 June 1922) was born at Sunbury-on-Thames, emigrated aboard Gipsy, arriving in Adelaide in 1852. He was educated at St. Matthews's (Church of England) School, Kensington, and St. Peter's College. The family returned to England, living at Chertsey; young Albion returned to Adelaide accompanied by his father in April 1870 aboard Norfolk, and gained commercial experience with merchants Jones, Scott, & Co. of Melbourne.
He was a keen yachtsman, and at the time of his death was Vice-Commodore of the Royal South Australian Yacht Squadron. While in England in 1914 he purchased a comfortable motor yacht, in which he frequently took parties of friends around Port Adelaide and St. Vincents Gulf. He also took an interest in horticulture, and had a fine garden at his home in Unley Park.

In 1883 Albion took on his brother Frederick as partner as A. E. & F. Tolley, and rented a section of Thomas Hardy and Sons' premises at 85 Currie Street, which they did not fully relinquish until 1901.

Frederick Osborne Tolley (1856 – 21 April 1913), as were his brothers, was described as cheery and good natured, an excellent companion, and a delightful host. No other accomplishments were mentioned in his obituary apart from the magnificent garden at his home, "Lowan" on Park Terrace, Gilberton.

They opened stores in Fremantle, Esperance and Norseman. In 1891 they purchased the Grenfell Street firm of Heseltine and Reid and in 1893, in conjunction with George Milne they purchased the wine and spirits stock of the S.A. Brewing, Malting and Wine and Spirit Company Limited, who had decided to concentrate on their core business, brewing beer, as the S.A. Brewing Company. A. E. & F. Tolley was re-formed as a limited liability family company on 30 July 1910 with directors A. E. Tolley, F. O. Tolley, and Alfred E. Stephens as directors. Many family members served on the board, and are mentioned in the Family list below. In 1913 a new building was erected at 82 Waymouth Street.

=== Tolley, Scott & Tolley ===
This company had its origin as the East Torrens Wine Making and Distillation Company at Nelson Street, Stepney in 1858, with Henry Mildred its first chairman of directors. The business was wound up in 1862, blaming insufficient capital for its failure. It was purchased by Hakan Linde (1822 – 17 January 1907), a coppersmith from Sweden, who built a distillation plant on the site, at some stage named the "Phoenix Distillery", and operated it profitably. Lindes Lane, off Rundle Street, was the site of his workshop.

Ernest A(lfred) "Tim" Tolley (11 October 1862 – 3 June 1925) was born on South Terrace, Adelaide, and was educated at St. Peter's College. In 1879 he was sent for three years to King's College London, where he studied under professors Thompson and (Sir Charles Loudon) Bloxam (1831-1887). He spent another three years in France, gaining winemaking experience at Épernay and Narbonne. On returning to England in 1885, he was apprenticed to Thomas Scott at his London distillery.
Thomas Scott (c. 1830 – 15 April 1899) had experience of distillation with one Menzies (perhaps the Caledonian distillery of Graham Menzies & Co.), Jersey, Peru and London, this last being his own business on Abbey Street, Bermondsey, South London, where he employed the two Tolley sons as apprentices. He left the Adelaide in 1893 for London, promising to return, but died at Deal, England.
Douglas A(ustral) "Doug" Tolley (20 October 1866 – 13 February 1932) was born in Chertsey, Surrey, also went to St. Peter's College, then studied at King's College London for five years. He was also apprenticed to Thomas Scott in 1885.
At some time he also gained experience in brandy making while working at Hennessy and Martell, brands no doubt handled by his family.

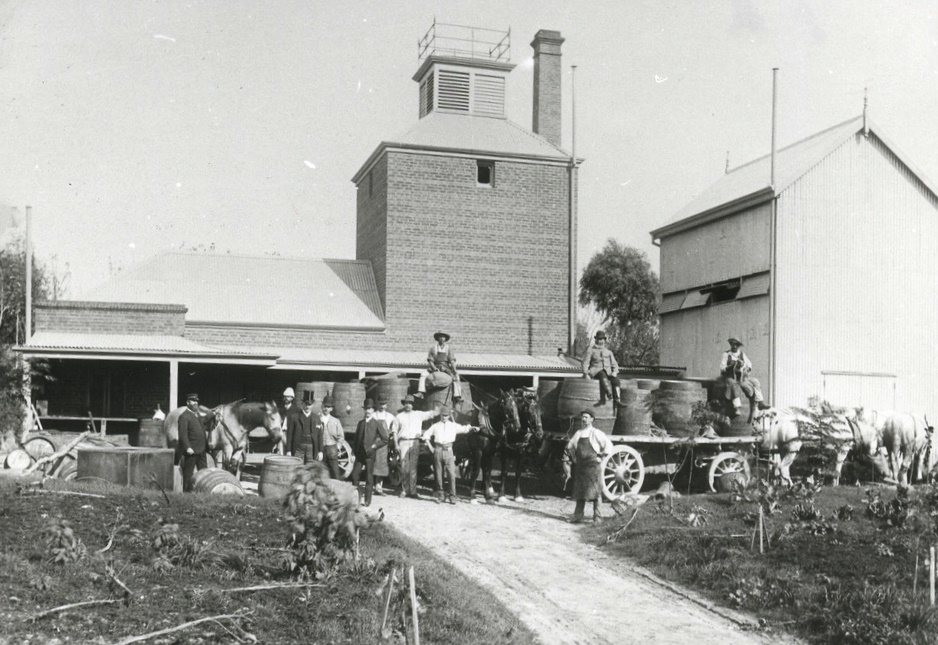
T.S.T. distillery, Stepney

The two brothers returned to Adelaide in December 1886 and May 1887, followed by Scott in 1888, in which year they purchased the "Phoenix Distillery" and promptly set about enlarging the facilities. A fourth partner, John Linnett, a Cockney partner of Scott with previous Australian experience, came out in 1891 and served as a manager. A son, John Archibald Linnett (died 1954), was a longtime resident of American River, Kangaroo Island.

In the early 1890s the grape-growers of Nuriootpa, Angaston and Tanunda were facing the prospect of another year's surplus with the concomitant problems of low prices and having to dump tons of rotting grapes. They appealed to the Tolleys to erect a distillery in their midst, and gave to the company as a "sweetener" a few acres of land at the intersection of Angaston and Tanunda Roads, Nuriootpa. The plan was put into effect and the Angas Park distillery was the result, producing T.S.T. brandy and spirit for production of fortified wines. The outcome was most satisfactory all round: the growers no longer were forced to suffer a loss in times of glut, and Tolley Scott & Tolley had a lucrative export trade.

In 1898 they purchased the "Nuriootpa Cellars" winery established by S. and W. Sage on the other side of the road, and installed pipes under the road for transfer of distilled spirit to the cellars. That same year they purchased a nearby property of 350 acres (140 ha) which they named "Bucklands" (recalling the name of A. E. Tolley's old property at Plympton) and added to it another 50 acres (20 ha).

In 1904 they upgraded the distillation plant at Nuriootpa.

In January 1921 the business was re-formed as a limited liability company with Arthur Scott Linnett, another son, as secretary. Linnett resigned in 1927 after some erratic behaviour, and became licensee of the Nairne Hotel.

By 1924 they had 250,000 imperial gallons (1,100 kL) of bond storage at Nuriootpa, and a similar capacity in their wine cellars. Sam and Len Tolley took over management of the company around this time, and a very large export market was developed; over half the brandy production going to Singapore and Malaya. Production at Stepney ceased around 1946, and the cellars devoted to maturation of brandy and fortified wines.

The business was restructured as a public company in 1959 and was acquired in 1961 by the Australian arm of The Distillers Company. The old Stepney buildings were renovated as company offices in 1972.

=== Douglas A. Tolley Pty, Ltd. ===
Douglas A. Tolley, independently of his involvement with T.S.T. in 1891 founded a vineyard and winery at Hope Valley. By 1903 his plantings covered some 95 acres (38 ha). His son Leonard J. Tolley succeeded him as governing director of the firm, producing mostly bulk wine for interstate customers. On Leonard's death his three sons Peter, David and Reginald shared management duties. David Tolley developed the Tolley Pedare (for Peter/David/Reginald) gewurztraminer grape variety in the mid-1970s. Peter's son Christopher was the first of the fourth generation to be involved in the company.

Mildara Blass purchased the winery in 1995.

== Family ==
Albion James Tolley (1819 – 12 January 1901) and Fanny Tolley, née Darbon or D'Arbon, (1830 – 27 December 1899) emigrated to Australia aboard Gipsy, arriving in August 1853, lived at Brougham Place, North Adelaide; "Shirley Lodge" Beulah Road, Norwood, South Australia, retired to "The Grange", South Norwood, Surrey, England by 1885, and died at his home "Hurstleigh" in the same suburb. Among their children were:

- Albion Everard Tolley (Albion Everard Tolley (1849 – 7 June 1922) (AEFT 1910–) married Julia/Julie Maude Boothman ( –1885) on 3 October 1879; he married again, to Edith Sabina Solberg ( –1893) in 1892; and married once more, to Mary Lloyd ( – 12 June 1945).

- Eric Everard Tolley ( –1943) (AEFT 1922–) married Joyce Athol MacArthur ( –1947)

- Dirk Everard Tolley (1924– )
- Ryk Everard Tolley (1924–1973) (AEFT chairman 1966–1973) He was plaintiff in dispute over grandfather's estate.

- Lloyd Everard Tolley (1899–1929) (AEFT 1922–1929) married Jean Morish Nicholls (1904– ). She married again, to Tom Patterson, moved to Sydney.

- Jill Lloyd Tolley ( – ) married footballer William "Bill" Morris (1921–1960) on 3 April 1950. In 1969 she married again, to Richard Henwood Fidock (15 May 1929 – ) (AEFT chairman c. 1975– ). Fidock, who was awarded an Order of Australia in 2004, had a previous marriage to (Margaret) Anne Whinnen (died 1968), and was the younger son of Lt. Col. Cyril Henwood Fidock (1898–1989), mayor of Glenelg 1950–53.

- Harriet Darbon Tolley (c. 1855 – 29 September 1919) married architect Ernest Henry Bayer (c. 1852 – 20 October 1908) on 11 March 1875.
- Frederick Osborne Tolley (1856 – 21 April 1913) never married. (AEFT 1910–1913) He died at his home, Park Street, Gilberton.
- Sydney Constantine Tolley BA LLB (21 April 1858 – 23 July 1896) married Lucy Gray Bayer on 7 April 1881
- Ada Tolley (22 September 1860 – 11 October 1942 ) left for Calcutta 1894, died at Edenbridge, Kent, England
- Ernest Alfred Tolley (11 October 1862 – 1925) married Ada Rosalie Ebsworth (–1932) in 1892 (AEFT 1913–1925)

- Samuel Elderton "Sam" Tolley (4 August 1893 – 8 February 1966) served with distinction in WWI, founded Elderton vineyard, Nuriootpa. (AEFT 1936–1966)
- Vera Tolley (1896– ) married Captain Auguste J. C. de Bavay (12 May 1887 – ) on 20 August 1919. He was a son of Auguste de Bavay

- Edith Tolley (26 September 1864 – ) married George Newell Nairn (c. 1858 – ) on 23 November 1889

- Douglas Newell Nairn MBE ( – ) served with the Royal Flying Corps in WWI; he was made an MBE in recognition of his war service.

- Douglas Austral Tolley (20 October 1866 – 13 February 1932) married Emily Adelaide Armbruster, daughter of Frederick Armbruster, on 27 October 1891

- Reginald Douglas Tolley (1893 – 11 March 1952) married Hilda Louise Turnbull in 1914. He left South Australia and was publican of the Open Hearth Hotel, Warrawong, New South Wales and died shortly after, under suspicious circumstances.
- Leonard James "Len" Tolley (1 September 1897 – 10 June 1965) (AEFT 1948–1965) married Ann May "Annie" Lester

- Peter James Tolley (6 June 1920 – 31 May 1987) employed by T.S.T. then at Hope Valley. Inducted Barons of Barossa in 1976.
- David Leonard Tolley (21 July 1923 – 12 September 2005) viticulturist
- Reginald Lester "Reg" Tolley (27 December 1927 – 8 September 2010) married Judith Anne Penfold Hyland on 20 April 1950

- Kym Tolley ( – ) vigneron in Coonawarra.

(AEFT denotes membership of A. E. & F. Tolley Limited's board of directors)

== Sources ==
- Bishop, Geoffrey C. The Vineyards of Adelaide Lynton Publications Pty. Ltd., Blackwood, SA. ISBN 0 86946 280 6
