= Fin DAC =

Irish contemporary painter, muralist and sculptor

- Born: Finbarr Notte; Cork, Ireland
- Known for: Street art
- Style: Urban aesthetics
- Movement: Contemporary art

Fin DAC (born Finbarr Notte), also known as Finbarr DAC, is a London-based Irish contemporary artist. His pseudonym derives from the name of his online portfolio, Dragon Armoury Creative. He is best known for his murals and canvas work, often featuring empowered Asian women, which he has painted in cities around the world.

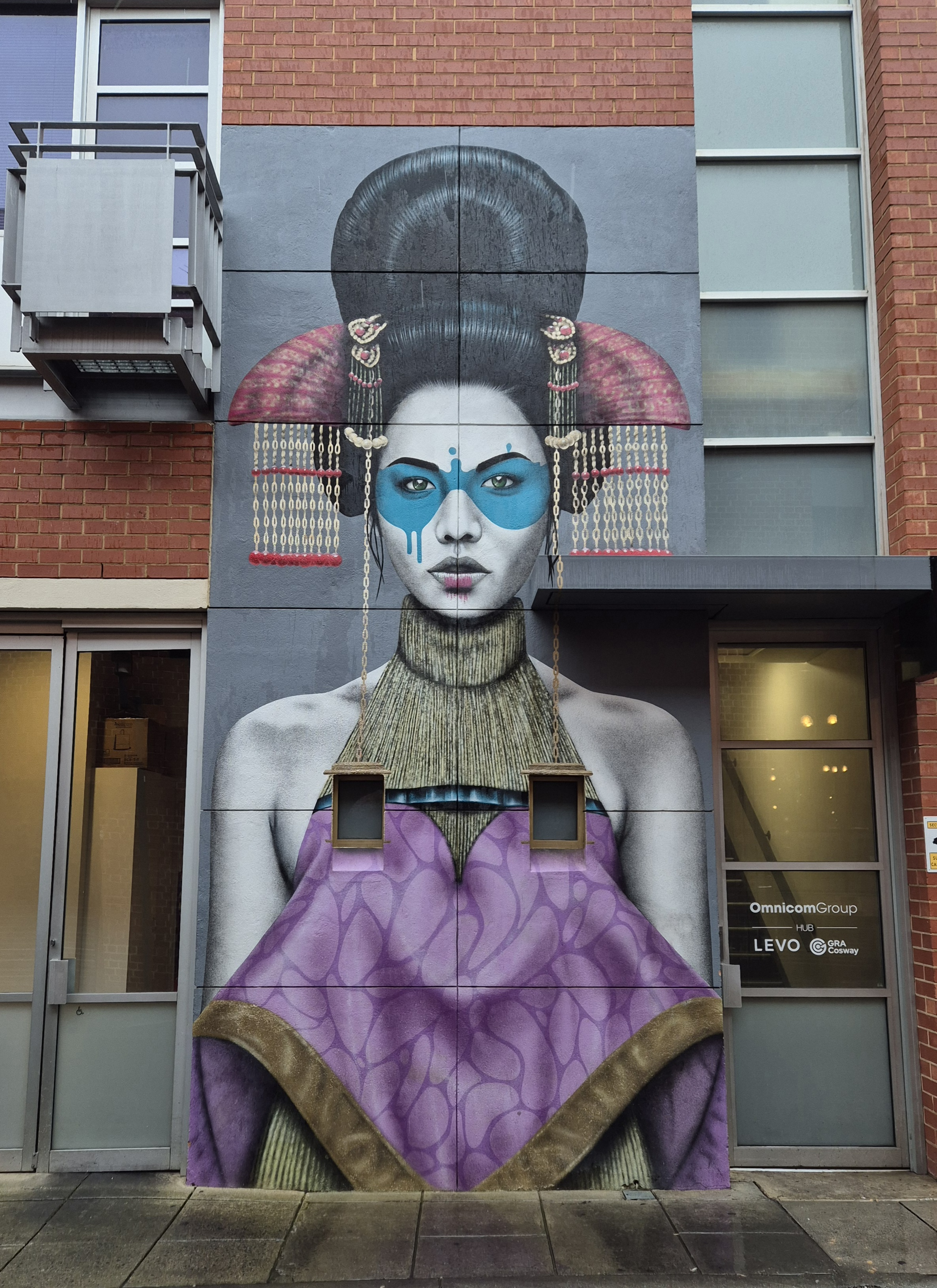
Zaluuokhin (2018), Vardon Avenue, Adelaide

== Early life and education ==
Fin DAC was born Finbarr Notte in Greenmount in the city of Cork, Ireland, moving with his family to London when he was around two. There they lived in social housing in South London, before returning to Cork when Notte was 10, and settling in Togher. He lived there until finishing school at 17. He did technical drawings and engineering at school.

He is a self-taught artist who was influenced at an early age by an Aubrey Beardsley print and an antique Japanese tea set that were both in his childhood home. He was unable get into university to study graphic design as he hadn't been to art school.

== Career ==
Living in London, Fin DAC started painting around 2007 after a relationship breakdown in his late 30s, to reduce the stress of his circumstances. For some time he worked as a web developer alongside developing his art practice, finally giving that up in around 2011.

In 2012, he was commissioned to paint for the London Olympics, and he has also painted for the Royal Albert Hall.

When in 2015 he was invited to an arts festival in New Zealand, he decided to visit Australia on the same trip, visiting Sydney, Adelaide, and Melbourne, painting a mural in each city.

=== Art practice and style ===
Fin DAC, the artist's pseudonym, comes from Dragon Armoury Creative, the name of his online portfolio. When Fin DAC initially started painting on the streets, urban art was commonly illegal, and often seen as vandalism, so the artist uses a moniker to protect his identity.

Fin DAC describes his style as "urban aesthetics", combining the stencil methods common in urban art with the aesthetic of traditional portraiture. The term is also a reference to a group of creatives from the late 19th century, including Beardsley, who believed art should be about creating beauty, not making political commentary. The artist's influences include Beardsley, Francis Bacon, and graphic novels. For Fin DAC, art has a therapeutic effect, helping the self who creates the art and the viewer who interacts with the art.

His most frequent subject matter is empowered Asian women painted with an enigmatic mask across their eyes. He says that he aims to paint women "in a non-objectifying kind of way... There's a western male fixation with Asian women; they can be seen as subservient or weak". He also chooses to "focus on cultures that are being lost". His work showcases inspiration from traditional Japanese woodblock prints, manga, graphic novels, and science fiction. His female portraiture incorporates a variety of visually opposing elements, such as mixing traditional dress and Eastern iconography with more modern and Western components. Fin DAC's work explores representation and identity through his portrayals of women—particularly women of Asian heritage—presenting his subjects as powerful and worthy of celebration, while challenging long-standing cultural stereotypes. Fin DAC asks his models to provide their own photographs, rather than facilitating the photoshoot himself, to ensure they are comfortable with the images and have agency in the process.

The distinctive mask, which repeatedly features in his portraiture, draws from various sources. One of these is the character of Pris from the film Blade Runner. The dichotomy of her being a sexual figure as well as an empowered, defiant one was something that Fin DAC found compelling. Another is the signature mask of pop star Annie Lennox, the first female androgynous icon of the 1980s. While Fin DAC does not share the significance of the two drips falling from his mask, the small dot in between his subjects’ eyes symbolises the artist himself. The dot, in the place of the third eye, represents his spiritual journey and aligns him with his subjects, who embody the empowerment that he searches for in himself.

=== Canvas work ===
During the COVID-19 pandemic, Fin DAC was no longer able to travel and paint murals, so he started working in the studio. His canvases are often mixed media and highlight the duality of his subjects, using clothing to express identity and power.

=== Collaborations ===
Fin DAC collaborated with Bang & Olufsen on a speaker cover for the company's Beoplay A9 speaker that was exclusively sold at Harrods in London.

In 2021, the artist collaborated with photographer Mick Rock, reworking some of Rock's best-known photographs of rock stars into prints and canvases. The collaboration was called MIDARO and proceeds of three of the print sales at auction went to the NHS, a mental health charity called Calm, and Care International.

In 2025, Fin DAC collaborated with globally-recognised DJs James Hype and MEDUZA, and painted a mural, original artwork, and limited edition prints to celebrate their residency at Hï Ibiza nightclub in Ibiza. Fin DAC, who has his own background in the DJ world, was inspired by their technical skills and creativity.

He has also engaged in collaborations with commercial brands, such as Armani, G-Star, and Red Bull.

=== Murals ===
Fin DAC has painted murals all over the world, including France, Germany, Spain, Cambodia, Australia, Tahiti, and across North America. For the artist, working in a public space allows him to make connections with a diverse range of people and bring art to all communities.

His prominent murals include:

==== Taaniko, 2015 ====
Painted in Tauranga, New Zealand, in December 2015 for Tauranga's first street art festival "Street Prints Mauao", Taaniko celebrates a Māori woman in traditional clothing with a Moko tattoo. Fin DAC said in 2024 that this was one of the murals he was most proud of.

==== Shinka, 2016 ====
Meaning "evolution" or "progress" in Japanese, Shinka is located in the inner Adelaide suburb of Kent Town in South Australia. Painted in January 2016 across a wall and roller door of a garage over four days, this mural combines East Asian and English Victorian visual elements. The face is that of one of his regular models, Meghna Lall. in June 2026, the mural was painted over by the new owner of the building.

==== Vergiss, 2016 ====
While he was on a tour throughout the United States in 2016, Fin DAC painted a mural in Tucson, Arizona entitled Vergiss. He had initially painted the same design in Berlin, Germany, but that mural was destroyed by someone who tried to remove it from the wall.

==== Osolterrae, 2017 ====
Osolterrae (meaning "Woman-Sun-Earth") was painted in 2017 in Portland, Oregon, on a building, featuring a living wall of 1,000 plants for the central figure's hair. Nicknamed "Attitude of Gratitude", this mural has become a local landmark and is widely cited as one of Portland's best murals.

==== Zaluuokhin (2018) ====
Zaluuokhin was painted on a building at 16 Vardon Avenue in the East End of Adelaide, Australia, in January 2018. Wall features, such as windows, are built into the painting, and at night ornaments hannging from the model's head light up. The artist used model Meghna Lall (also featured in Shinka), and the mural is part of his "Hidden Beauty" series, painted around the world. It took three days to create.

==== Simchoon (2019) ====
In early 2019 Fin DAC, with assistance from Jack Fran, created Simchoon (Note: Probably referring to Gladys Sym Choon - see Rundle Street.) (also part of his "Hidden Beauties" series) on the Lower Napier building at North Terrace campus of Adelaide University. The model was Christina Nadin.

==== Magdalena, 2019 ====
In 2019, the Frida Kahlo Foundation granted Fin DAC sole rights to alter Kahlo's image for a 200-foot (61 m) high mural in Guadalajara. The mural celebrates Kahlo's personal strength, artistic endurance, and colourful fashion sense, and is the largest depiction of the artist in the world.

==== Engeika, 2019 ====
Painted in Kopenicker Strasse in Berlin, this large-scale mural integrates preexisting architecture into the design.

==== Shisoka, 2019 ====
Painted in Acton, West London, Shisoka utilises the architecture of the wall the mural is painted on to inform the design. In addition to his signature large-scale figural portraits, Fin DAC paints a landscape as a background.

==== A Quiet Moment of Contemplation, 2020 ====
Fin DAC painted this mural in the private garden of a women's psychiatric intensive care unit at the St Charles Centre for Health and Wellbeing in London called the Shannon Ward. The artist intentionally left the lower portion of the mural unfinished so that the inpatients could paint on the floral patterns on the kimono. He said in October 2024 that this was his "most meaningful mural to date".

==== Kokesh, 2020 ====
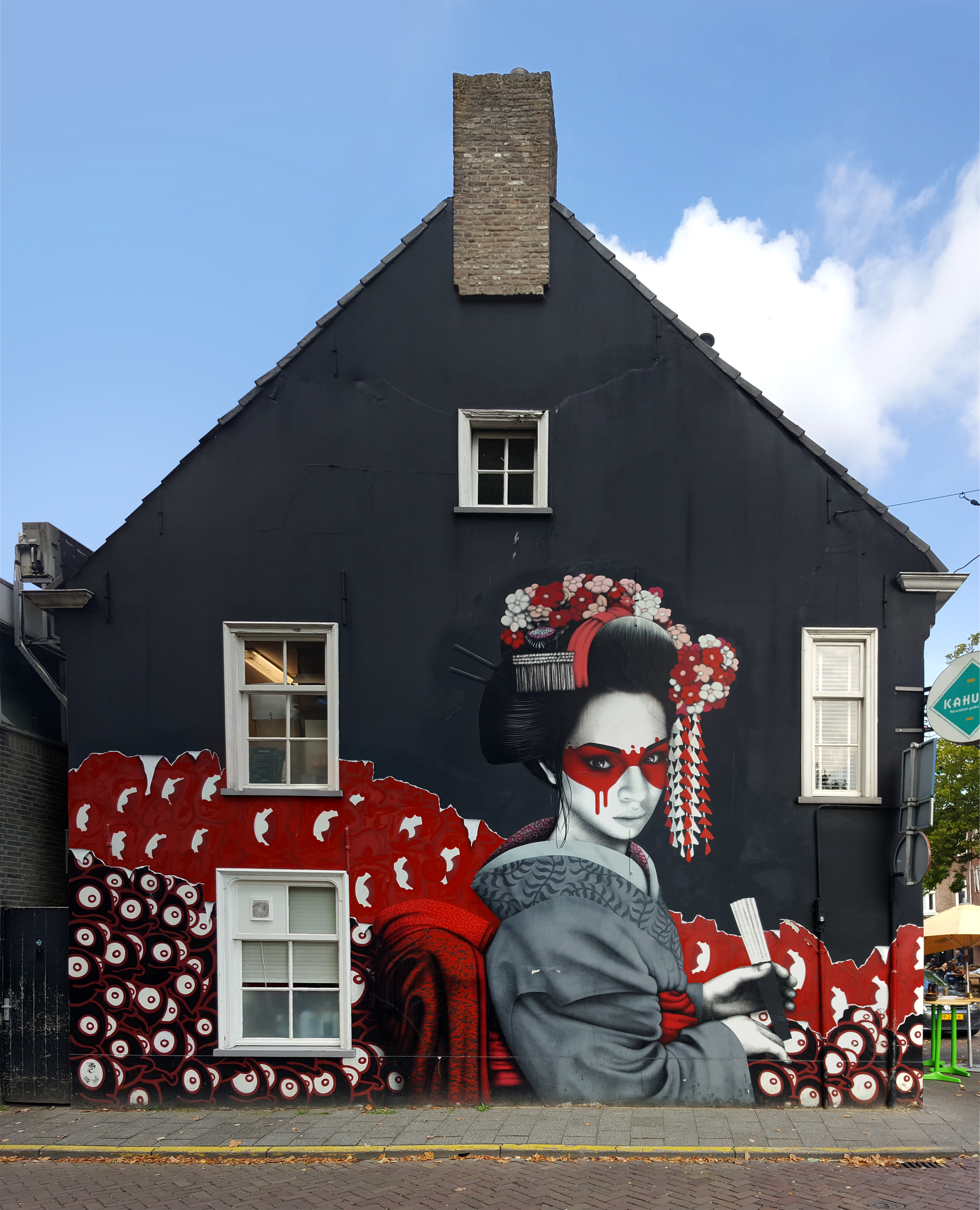
Kokesh, Netherlands (2020)

As part of his “Hidden Beauty” series, Fin DAC painted Kokesh 2020 in The Netherlands in 2020, in collaboration with local artists Nol Art and Edo Rath. The red and white color palette references both the Japanese culture celebrated in the mural's subject matter but also the palette of the Netherlands flag.

==== Le Mur Oberkampf, 2025 ====
Fin DAC painted this mural, known as mural N°395, in Le Mur Oberkampf in Paris, France.

== Recognition ==
In 2017, Fin DAC's work was featured on both an Irish and an Australian postage stamp. The Australian stamp featured his 2016 work in Adelaide, Shinka.

== Exhibitions ==
=== Selected solo exhibitions ===
Fin DAC had his first solo show in Venice, California in 2015, entitled Nadeshiko.

In 2021, his next solo show, Afterglow/Undertow, was held at Gallery Different in London and included sculptures, paintings, collages, sketches and prints.

In 2024, Fin DAC had a solo exhibition at the underground crypt gallery St. Martin's Lane underground crypt gallery located beneath Trafalgar Square in London, entitled HomEage. The show featured portraits split in half, combining his signature aesthetic with a recreation of an artworld icon, like Andy Warhol, Frida Kahlo and Pablo Picasso, who inspired him. The works in this show were only available to view, not to purchase, to eschew any interpretation that Fin DAC was profiting off of other artists.

In 2025, the Goldshteyn-Saatort Gallery in Paris mounted a solo exhibition of Fin Dac's work. The show combined the aesthetics of urban art with Japonisme, Art Nouveau and the Belle Epoque.

=== Selected group exhibitions ===
- Street Art Is Female - United Nations, New York, 2024
- Seven - Tribe Art Gallery, Cambodia, 2025

== Museum collections ==
Fin DAC's work is included in the collection of the Urban Nation Museum for Urban Contemporary Art in Berlin, and in the Straat Museum in Amsterdam.

== Personal life ==
Fin DAC is also known as Finbarr DAC.

He said that he lived with an "unsuitable" partner in London during his 30s. They had children together, and after the relationship dissolved around 2007, he had to resort to the courts to get access to them. He started painting around this time to reduce the stress of his circumstances.
