= Kent Town, South Australia =

Kent Town
- Suburb
- Interactive map of Kent Town
- Country: Australia
- State: South Australia
- City: Adelaide
- LGA: City of Norwood Payneham St Peters

Government
  - State electorate: Dunstan
  - Federal division: Sturt

Area
  - Total: 0.6 km^{2} (0.23 sq mi)

Population
  - Total: 1,443 (SAL 2021)
- Postcode: 5067
Suburbs around Kent Town
Hackney	College Park	Stepney
Adelaide	Kent Town	Norwood
Adelaide	Adelaide	Rose Park

Kent Town is an inner suburb of Adelaide, South Australia. It is located in the City of Norwood Payneham & St Peters local government area. It has been the site of many historic buildings and establishments, including Dr Kent's Paddock, the Kent Town Brewery, and the Wesley Uniting Church. Trams ran through the suburb from the mid-19th century, eventually being removed in the 1950s.

== History ==
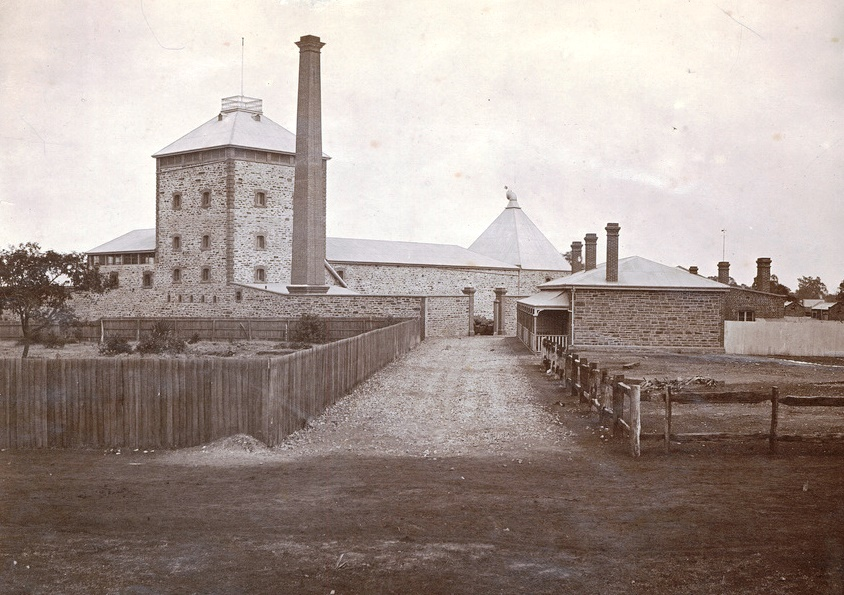
Kent Town Brewery, c. 1876

Kent Town was named for Benjamin Archer Kent (1808 – 25 November 1864), a medical practitioner of Walsall, Staffordshire, who emigrated to South Australia aboard Warrior, arriving in April 1840 with his wife Marjory Redman Kent, née Bonnar, and two children, Benjamin Andrew Kent, and Graham Eliza Kent, who in 1848 married Frederick Charles Bayer (died 15 August 1867). Hydraulic engineer C. A. Bayer and architect E. H. Bayer were sons. Another son, Tom, was a kangaroo hunter, who went to live at the township of Yalata (now Fowlers Bay) on the west coast, and created a cluster of cottages named "Kent Town", which no longer exist.

Kent established a flour mill and farm which failed financially and he was obliged to return to his profession to support his family. He sold his property at a handsome profit, repaid all his creditors and returned to England.

He was the attendant physician when Edwin Thomas Smith was born in 1830. Smith later built his Kent Town Brewery on the site of the doctor's cottage.

The Wesley Uniting Church was founded as the Jubilee Wesleyan Methodist church in 1864 by George P. Harris, John Colton, F. H. Faulding, and others. It has had a significant place in the life of South Australians for over 150 years.

Kent Town was the location of two successive sites of the Kent Town Brewery, the second of which in 1888 became the malthouse for SA Brewing, now redeveloped into apartments.

Both Equipment Limited, a workshop in which Edward and Donald Both worked on their inventions, was for some time in the 1940s located in King William Street. The site has now been demolished.

In the latter half of the 19th century, a tram network serviced Kent Town, with one branch running eastwards to Kensington Gardens. They transitioned from horse-drawn trams around 1909, and were all removed in the 1950s.

=== Dr Kent's Paddock ===
There is a large section of land known as "Dr Kent's Paddock", much of which is now part of Prince Alfred College grounds. The social housing known as "Dr Kent's Paddock Housing Complex", facing 3-57 Capper Street and 28-48 Rundle Street and comprising 114 homes, was designed by Newell Platten, Chief Architect at the SA Housing Trust, and built by the Housing Trust in two stages, the first in 1978–9 and the second in 1981. The medium-density complex includes a warehouse conversion of a former John Martin's warehouse built in 1912.

According to a report by the SA Heritage Council released in 2022, the complex "is widely acknowledged as one of the best medium-density, cluster-housing urban infill developments built in South Australia during the late twentieth century". It is still owned by the state government housing authority, now renamed Housing SA. The Australian Institute of Architects regards it as a good model of social housing, "designed with consideration of community, environmental performance, privacy and access to landscaped space". In early November 2023, after receiving 38 written submissions during the consultation period, the Heritage Council provisionally listed Dr Kent's Paddock Housing Complex in the South Australian Heritage Register under the Heritage Places Act 1993. The listing was confirmed on 19 November, after environment minister Susan Close backed the submission. The gardens include an old pepper tree.

=== Other heritage listings ===
As of July 2026, there are 17 state-heritage listed locations, and around 50 that are local heritage listings.

== Demographics ==
The 2016 Census measured the population of Kent Town at 1,210 persons.

By the 2021 Census, there were 1,443 persons recorded. They are predominantly male (56.7%), with a median age of 36. There were 303 families, with an average of 1.5 children per family. Around 43% of people aged 15 and above were tertiary-educated. People born in Australia accounted for 58.3%, with the next largest group (5.6%) born in England. More people (42.6%) had both parents born overseas than both in Australia (41.5%).

== Schools ==
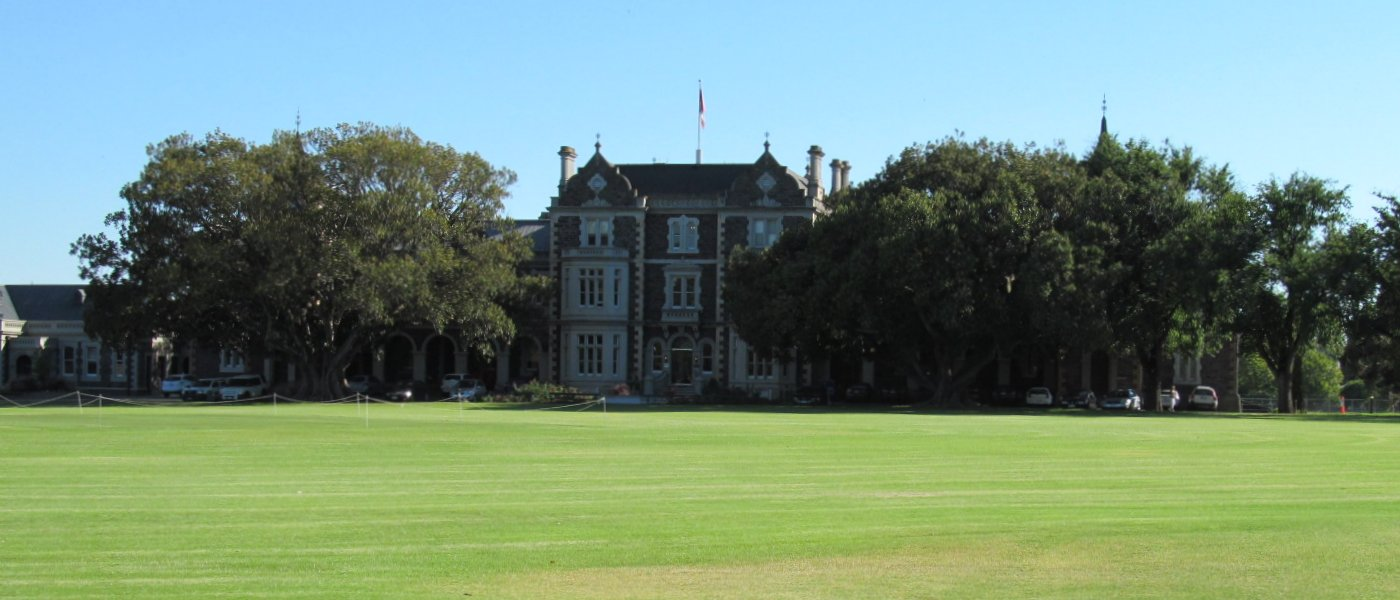
View of Prince Alfred College from Dequetteville Tce

Prince Alfred College, an independent school for boys is located on Dequetteville Terrace, the western boundary of the suburb.

== Attractions ==
During the Adelaide Fringe festival, the world's second-largest annual arts festival, the bars and restaurants of Kent Town receive thousands of customers.

A large mural by Irish street artist Fin DAC, titled Shinka,was painted in Rundle Street, Kent Town, in January 2016 across a wall and roller door of a garage over four days. However, in June 2026, the mural was painted over by the new owner of the building.

== Transport ==
=== Roads ===
The suburb is serviced by the following main roads:

- Dequetteville Terrace, forming the western boundary of the suburb
- Fullarton Road, running north–south between Norwood and Springfield
- Rundle Street, cutting horizontally across the middle of Kent Town

The roads King William Street and Little King William Street are not connected to King William Street in Adelaide city centre.

=== Public transport ===
Kent Town is serviced by buses run by the Adelaide Metro, including along Flinders Street, Dequetteville Terrace, The Parade West, and Rundle Street.

== See also ==
- List of Adelaide suburbs
