= West End Draught =

South Australian lager brewed by Lion

- Manufacturer: Lion (Kirin)
- Alcohol by volume: 4.5%
- Style: Australian lager

West End Draught, commonly referred to as red tins, is a South Australian lager brewed by Lion, a subsidiary of Japanese company Kirin.

== History ==
The Lanfear brothers were three British siblings who developed the West End breweries in Australia during the 19th century. At that time, the company's shareholders were British too. Albert Lanfear left West End in 1893 to develop Lion Brewery.

West End Draught was formerly brewed by the South Australian Brewing Company on Port Road, Thebarton, which was taken over by Lion in 1993. The company continued to trade as SA Brewing until 1 May 2019. Lion continues to use the name West End Brewery for its current brewery and website, which was the name of a former brewery on Hindley Street, taken over by SA Brewing in 1888.

In 2015, Lion announced the completed, $70-million upgrade of the West End Brewery with an augmented production capacity of 120 million liters/year and a 1930s restored copper kettle. At this point, the brewery produced other beers of Lion's portfolio (Hahn, Tooheys, Guinness, Kilkenny). A cidery was also integrated to the brewery.

In October 2020, Lion announced the closure of the Thebarton plant in June 2021, with production of West End Draught being transferred to breweries in Victoria. The closing caused some distress to locals who enjoyed the brewery's presence and economy since the 1890s.

== Description ==
West End Draught is a full-strength beer with an alcohol percentage of 4.5%.

Other beers formerly brewed under the West End brand were West End Export, West End Gold, and West End Light, but these are no longer manufactured.

== Sponsorship ==
West End are the original sponsors of the AFL "Showdown" and the "Slowdown" charity game in the Australian Football League (AFL).

The company is actively involved with the South Australian National Football League. In 1954, the annual tradition of painting the colors of the SANFL grand finalist teams on the brewery chimney began. The company also sponsors the West End State Team and the West End Country State Team; and cricket including the South Australian Cricket Association, the West End Redbacks, Adelaide Strikers, and Bowls South Australia.

== In popular culture ==
West End Bitter was extensively shown and consumed in the 1971 Australian feature film Wake in Fright.

West End red tins feature in the 2023 film Emotion Is Dead, written and directed by Pete Williams.

== Bibliography ==
- Stubbs, Brett J. (2010). Beer, Mines and Rails: A History of the Brewing Industry in Queensland to the 1920s. Tankard Books. ISBN 9780980620917.

== See also ==
- Beer in Australia
- List of breweries in Australia
- West End Brewery
