= Hindmarsh Brewery =

Former brewery in Hindmarsh, South Australia

The Hindmarsh Brewery was a brewery founded c.1844 in Hindmarsh, in the then colony of South Australia, by E. J. F. "Fred" Crawford. Crawford lost possession of the business in 1859, then re-established it on a different site before becoming bankrupt. It was then taken over by Henry Haussen and George Catchlove, and was successfully operated by them and their successors until 1927.

== History ==
The Hindmarsh Brewery has been touted as the first in the colony, but others almost certainly predated it: there was

- Anthony Lillyman's (died 1847) brewery, on the banks of the River Torrens, which was a known landmark in March 1838, and closed later that year.
- John Warren (c. 1783 – 22 March 1873), arrived January 1838 aboard Royal Admiral, had a brewery on the banks of the Torrens that same year
- Union Brewery on south side of Rundle street, James Place corner: Daniel Cudmore 1838 to 1841?; John Richmond (c. 1797–1862) and John Primrose 1841 to November 1875.
- Grenfell Street brewery opposite Fordham's hotel 1839
- Auld & Shand's "Torrens Brewery" "Park Land Brewery" 1841; both John Auld and John Shand insolvent 1843.
- Thomas Kilpatrick Auld's "Adelaide Brewery" in August 1842 on Town Acre 49, north side of Hindley Street, two allotments from King William Street. John Auld was publican of "Adelaide Brewery Hotel" next door. He and John were brothers of Patrick Auld. Thomas later had a brewery at Morphett Vale, then Gawler. Proved insolvent 1858, possibly moved interstate.
- John Newington had the Kent Brewery on Halifax Street near St John's Church, before December 1842. Insolvent 1846.
- Thomas Moulden's Barleycorn Brewery, Rundle Street, opposite Sir John Barleycorn Hotel (1843 to 1846).
- Andrew Birrell and Edward Moger 1843; Birrell (died 1867?) insolvent 1843; Moger (c. 1812–1899) then employed at Pirie Street Brewery, insolvent 1851, later at Gumeracha Brewery, Gumeracha.
- Away from the city, the Balhannah Brewery operated 1843 to 1844 by James Turnbull Thomson, again in 1855.

and around the same time:

- Tasmanian Brewery, at rear of Tasmanian Hotel, Hindley Street, near the corner of Morphett Street, operated by John Wheland in 1844.
- William Hardyman Colyer and William Williams founded Walkerville Brewery 1844
- W. H. Clark's Halifax Street Brewery 1844

=== Crawford brothers ===
Edward James Frederick "Fred" Crawford (c. 1809 – 8 May 1880) and George Tinline were partners in a brewery, which by 1844 was producing an ale of marketable quality. From that year on, Tinline's name did not appear with reference to the brewery; though it is likely that being a banker, his interest in the business was only ever financial, and remained so. The brewery then operated as "Crawford Brothers", though the name of no brother ever appeared in connection with the brewery. James Field Crawford (1815 – 24 May 1906), the explorer, and Thomas George Tremlett Crawford (c. 1825 – 5 September 1911) were brothers, for whom Mt. Crawford may have been named. (Note: Fanny Crawford (1829 – 7 April 1898), who married publican Charles James Ware (c. 1824 – 19 December 1891), was a daughter of William Crawford, arrived aboard D'Auvergne March 1839, and probably not related.) (Note: T. G. T. Crawford may have been the Thomas George Crawford of Newbridge Brewery which wound up in 1876.)

The brewery was situated on Lot 83, Manton Street, Hindmarsh, which Crawford leased from Daniel Cudmore, and later purchased; the area today bounded by Orsmond, Milner, and Manton streets, and Crawford Lane.

The site was noted for the safe drinking water which the brewery extracted from an aquifer, using a pump built by John Ridley, and made available to nearby residents.

In 1850 Crawford purchased from Luther Scammell a strip of land, soon dubbed Brewery Lane, for better access from the Port Road to his brewery. At a later date this was known as Kangaroo Lane, and is now Crawford Lane.

In July 1854 W. H. Clark, with partners J. B. Spence, J. H. Parr and Edward Logue, took over Crawford Brothers' Hindmarsh Brewery in order to close it down and supply its customers from their Halifax Street brewery. The business continued however under Crawford, but under what conditions it has not yet been found. In 1859, under financial stress, he assigned the property to his creditors. Around this time Crawford was manager of the Pirie Street Brewery.

In 1861 he purchased the brewery founded in 1859 by Watson & Borrers, on Hindmarsh Lot 162 on nearby Richards Street. and taken over the following year by the short-lived partnership of Bauer & Coulthard.

Crawford was an avid real estate speculator, which may have been the cause of his bankruptcy in 1867 after four years of drought and recession, and he departed for Ararat, Victoria out of reach of his creditors. The property was purchased by Haussen & Catchlove.

In 1869 E. J. F. Crawford founded the Crawford and Moyle brewery, later Crawford Brothers, and did much to encourage local hop growing. The brewery closed sometime before 1875 and he was employed at the Victoria Brewery, Sale, Victoria. He and his wife died there, she in 1877 and he died intestate in 1880. Probate was granted to his eldest son James John Crawford (1848– ) in 1894 and published ten years later. John James Crawford settled in Koroit, perhaps initially in straitened circumstances but grandson Sidney Crawford (1885–1968) became a wealthy and influential Adelaide businessman.

=== Haussen & Catchlove ===
Henry Hermann Haussen (1 September 1830 – 28 December 1870) was born in London, a son of Otto Carl Haussen (c. 1781 – 11 August 1862) and Maria Haussen (c. 1784 – 15 June 1865), who emigrated to South Australia aboard John, arriving in September 1839 with their children Otto Charles Haussen (c. 1821 – 16 October 1881) married Henriette Wormker (spelling?) in 1850, Emily Rose, Emma and Henry Hermann. Emily Rose, the youngest daughter, married G.A.F. Heseltine on 7 May 1846. Haussen established a potato business in Gouger Street, Adelaide that operated 1859–1870; much of the business being importation of seed potatoes from Van Diemen's Land (today's Tasmania).

George Henry Catchlove (c. 1830 – 17 October 1892) and his widowed father Henry Catchlove (c. 1806–1867) arrived in June 1839 aboard Hooghly. Henry's brother Edward William Catchlove (c. 1878–1846) arrived in November 1836 aboard Tam O'Shanter with a larger family. His wife Harriet died en voyage. Edward was licensee of the Shipwright's Arms, Albert Town (today's Alberton), transferred it to George in 1845.

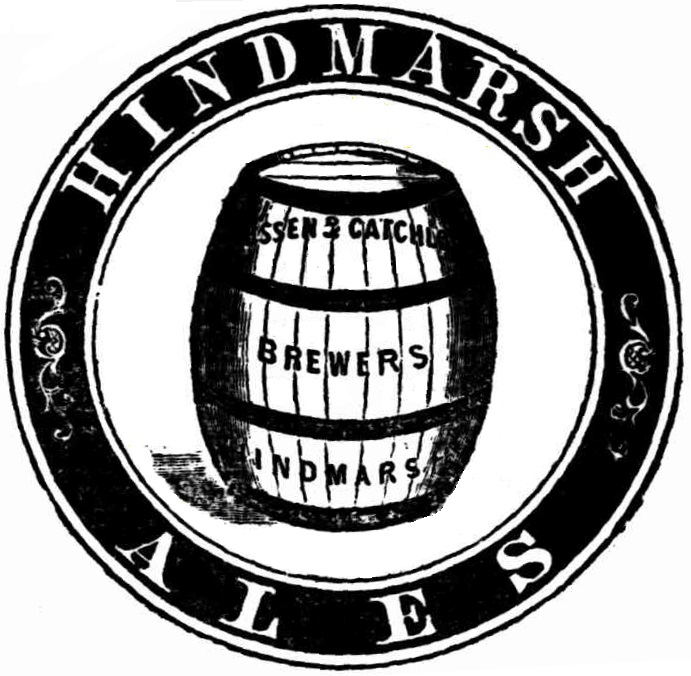
Advertising logo, Haussen & Catchlove's Hindmarsh Ales

The Hindmarsh Brewery was purchased in 1868 from Crawford's bankrupt estate by Haussen and his brother-in-law Catchlove, operating it originally as Crawford & Co., then Haussen & Catchlove. The brewery's cellars, dubbed "the warren", were extensive, totalling about 300 yards (270 m), and remarkable for requiring no timbering or brickwork, as the ground was of a most tenacious type of clay.

They had offices at 63 Hindley Street, which from January 1869 also carried a wide range of imported ale, wines and spirits. They also had an office and warehouse at Port Adelaide. The company only produced their beverages in barrels for supply to licensed premises, but at least one company made a business of bottling their ales and porters: this was R. Strutton of Gilbert Place, later of Blyth Street.

Haussen died in 1870, and his wife continued as partner in the business until 1874 when it was purchased by Frederick Estcourt Bucknall and Frank South Botting (c. 1849–1894), but continued trading as Haussen & Co.

Some time after 1881 Bucknall, who was Mayor of Hindmarsh 1880–1883, ceased to have any involvement in the Company, perhaps as late as 1886 when he lost most of his fortune with the failure of the Commercial Bank of South Australia. Botting and his father Francis Joseph Botting (1819–1906) took over the business. Frank Botting died in November 1894, and his father became sole proprietor.

A public company Haussen & Co. Ltd. was established in 1910 to operate the Richards Street brewery, which continued operation until 1927, when it was absorbed by the Walkerville Cooperative Brewing Co. Haussen & Co. continued as owners of their various hotels, but contracted to that company (which despite its name was located at Southwark) for their supplies. (Auguste John) Charles De Bavay (died 10 November 1962), son of Auguste Joseph Francois De Bavay OBE (1856–1944) was head brewer 1913, and introduced new methods and equipment.

=== Strutton & Trapmann ===
In 1876 Robert Strutton (died 1919) and Carl Wilhelm Ferdinand Trapmann (Mayor of Hindmarsh 1876–1877; died 1885) opened the "Kangaroo Brewery" on the site of the old Hindmarsh Brewery. The business closed in 1884, but the "Kangaroo Brewery" sign, and the informal name "Kangaroo Lane" (now Crawford Lane) persisted into the 20th century.

== Crawford family ==
Edward James Frederick Crawford (7 December 1809 – 15 May 1880) was a son of Captain Crawford of HMS Victorious. He married Mary Ann Scott, emigrated aboard Dorset, arriving in Adelaide January 1839 with daughters Ann Eliza and Elizabeth. Fate of mother (who may have died before embarkation) and daughter Ann not yet known. His first employment in the new country was in the office of The Southern Australian. His family includes:

- Elizabeth Crawford (c. 1837 – 2 May 1866) married John Flaxman (c. 1836–1901) of Melbourne on 12 May 1857, died at Warrnambool

He married Frances Mitchell ( – 1 April 1877) in Sydney on 31 July 1841. She was a sister of T. N. Mitchell of Anlaby station.

- James John Crawford (7 February 1848 – 17 October 1926), accountant, married Ruth Harding (1859 – 17 February 1946) of Whanganui, New Zealand, on 15 November 1879? 25 November 1880?, lived Koroit, Victoria, then Brighton, South Australia. Prominent among their seven sons were:

- Edward James Frederick Crawford ( – ) married Margaret Elizabeth Gray of Horsham, Victoria on 30 May 1907, lived at Buninyong. Named identically to his grandfather, he was manager of the National Bank at Koroit, Angaston, Eudunda, Strathalbyn, Wagga Wagga, Albury Bendigo and Prahran, playing organ at several of the earlier towns' Congregational churches. An identically named distant relative (1865 – 28 December 1941), see below, was a health inspector and architect in Melbourne.
- Lindsay Tremlett Crawford (27 April 1882 – 2 December 1973)
- Sidney Crawford (4 November 1885 – 14 May 1968) married Elsie Mary Allen on 10 September 1920
- Rev. Norman Crawford (died 1968?), psychologist and (Anglican) priest at Plympton and at Glenelg; a Howard League member noted for his opposition to the hanging of Max Stuart.
- Arthur Crawford (c. May 1893 – ) bank clerk, served in France with the Motor Transport Service; married Estella Helena Mitchell, daughter of Lt.-Col. C. Ashmore Mitchell VD (1862–1941). Arthur was still alive 1946.
- Francis "Doc" Crawford (c. March 1895 – 30 August 1913)

- Frederick Henry Crawford (16 June 1850 – 9 December 1915) married Jane Margaret Clugston on 1 June 1893 in Whanganui, New Zealand, where he was employed as a brewer
- Lindsay Crawford (9 April 1852 – 19 March 1901) died at Newcastle Waters, Northern Territory
- Frances Madeline Jane "Madeline" Crawford (1853 – ) married John Edward Kelsey in Katherine, Northern Territory on 10 December 1886

Also on Dorset were his brothers James Field Crawford (1815 – 24 May 1906), (Note: A. T. Saunders gives him rank of Lieutenant and has him aboard Porter which arrived in SA a few days after Dorset. This is not supported by Barry Leadbeater's lists.) Thomas George Tremlett Crawford (c. 1825 – 5 September 1911 in Brisbane), and (possibly) Sidney Malone Crawford (c. 1823 – 5 November 1864) who had arrived in SA by 1842 but not found on Dorset passenger list. He married Blakely Robson on 16 June 1849, was brewer at Sandhurst, Victoria, and had one son, Edward James Frederick Crawford (1865–1941), architect of Melbourne. Blakely married again on 21 December 1878, to Peter Tyson, squatter of Corrong Station.

Relationship (if any) to Hugh Archibald Crawford (c. 1824 – 6 October 1881), his son Robert Hugh Crawford (c. 1854 – 18 October 1930) and grandson Hugh John Crawford (c. 1883 – 21 March 1943), who owned Adelaide's major grocery, in Hindley Street and King William Street from 1852 to 1933, has not been established.

Another whose relationship has not been established is Capt. Henry Spencer Crawford ( – 14 November 1861), co-founder of Kent Town Brewery.

== Haussen family ==
Henry Hermann Haussen emigrated aboard John with his parents Otto Carl and Maria Haussen, and siblings Otto Charles, Emily Rose and Emma, arriving in February 1840. He married Rosa Catchlove (7 December 1840 – 23 November 1899), eldest daughter of Henry Catchlove, on 2 March 1858. Their children included:

- Emily Mary Haussen (4 May 1859 - 1914) married Harry Walker ( – 25 November 1886) on 20 April 1881

- Fred Walker (5 January 1884 – 21 July 1935), chairman Fred Walker & Co., later Kraft Walker, manufacturers of Vegemite

- Rosa Henrietta Haussen (2 November 1860 – 29 November 1915) married brewer Arthur Wellington Ware (1867 – 29 January 1927) on 11 March 1884
- Ada Haussen (3 February 1864 – 29 December 1952) married William John Allsop Begg (c. 1866 – 29 September 1947)
- Henry Spencer "Spence" Haussen (3 September 1865 – 1942) Spence died in Wyong, New South Wales
- Amelia Haussen (26 January 1869 - ) married architect Arthur Dan Bendle Garlick (30 May 1863 – 27 June 1901) on 8 April 1890, died in Maryborough, Queensland. Garlick was a son of pioneer architect Daniel Garlick.
- Anna Hermanna Haussen (6 January 1871 – 14 March 1943) married solicitor George Andrew Greer ( – 1 May 1905) on 18 June 1890. She never remarried.

== Catchlove family ==
Henry Catchlove (c. 1806 – 26 October 1867), a widower, and his son George Henry Catchlove arrived in SA June 1839 aboard Hooghly.

- George Henry Catchlove (c. 1830 – 17 October 1892) married Amelia Sayers ( –1929) in 1853. They had no children.

Around 1840 he married Emma Filmer, who arrived with her parents and large family aboard Lloyds in December 1838. Their children included:

- Rosa Catchlove (7 December 1840 – 23 November 1899) married Henry Hermann Haussen on 2 March 1858
- Nora Catchlove (1851– )
- Alice Maud Mary Catchlove (1854– ) married cousin Zechariah Sayers in 1873
- Alfred Harry Catchlove (1856– )
- Harry Charles Catchlove (1858– )
- Albert Henry Catchlove (1864– ) married Eva McCulloch of Prahran, Victoria, on 6 March 1890

Emma married again, to James James in 1876.

A brother Edward William Catchlove arrived in South Australia November 1836 aboard Tam O'Shanter. His daughter Jane Catchlove married William Williams of Walkerville Brewery on 25 October 1877. A granddaughter Mary Laura Williams (1845 – 13 November 1880) married Thomas Moseley, son of Henry Jackson Moseley, founder of the Pier Hotel, Glenelg, on 25 October 1877.

== Other breweries ==
Other breweries operating in the late 1860s included:

- Kent Town Brewery;
- Union Brewery:
- Pirie Street Brewery;
- West End Brewery;
- Morphett Street Brewery; and
- Walkerville Brewery.
