= Edwin Thomas Smith =

Australian politician (1830–1919)

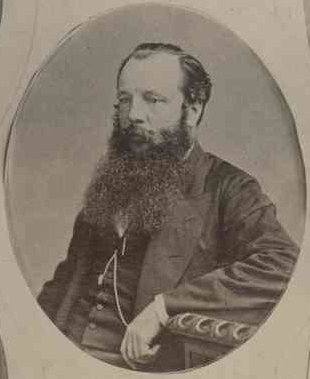
1872 - politician

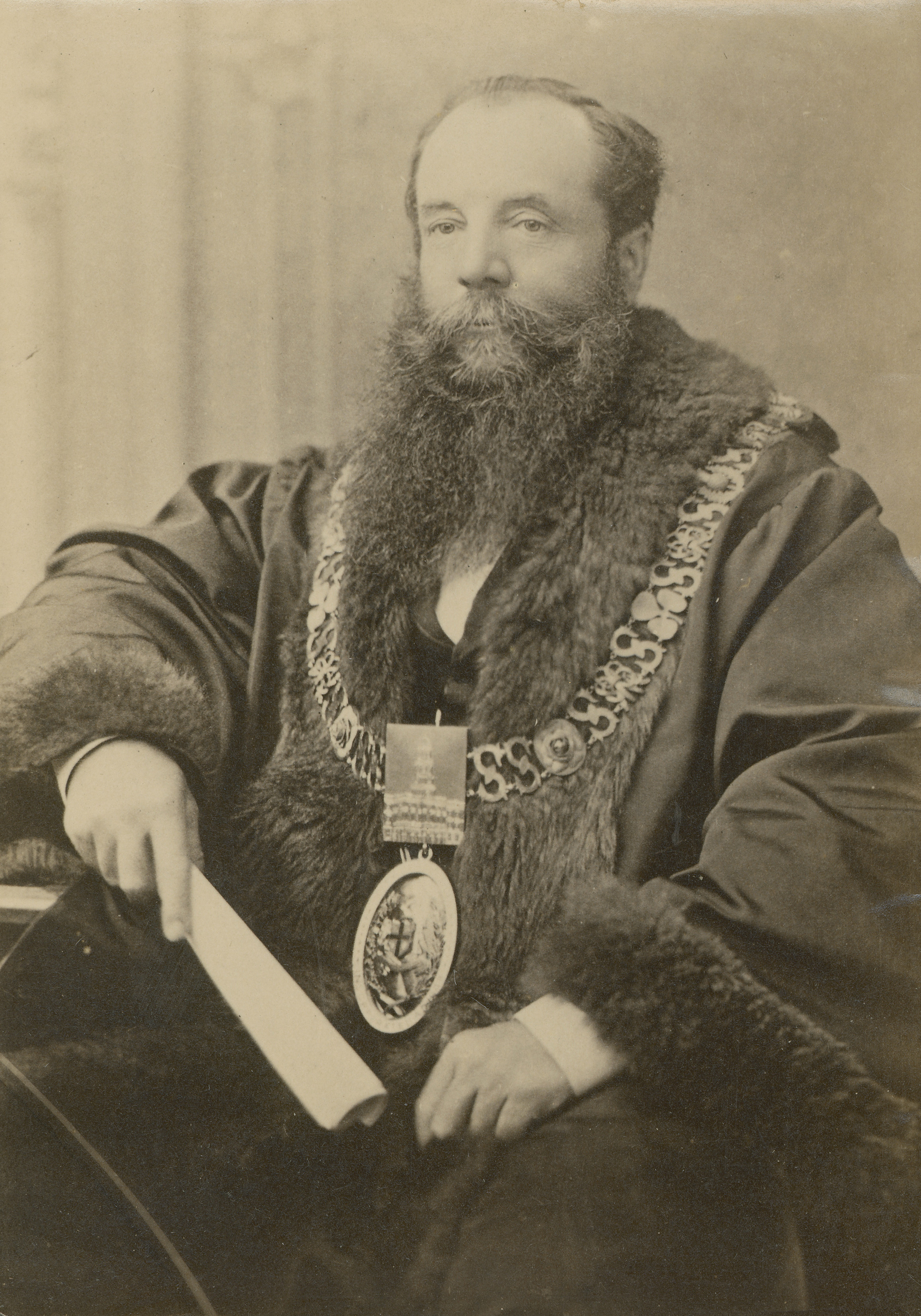
1887 - Mayor

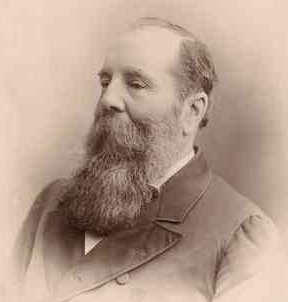
1890 - Sir Edwin

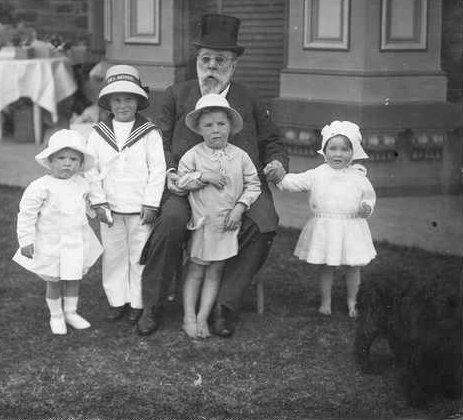
1919 - grandfather

Sir Edwin Thomas Smith KCMG (6 April 1830 – 25 December 1919) was an English-born South Australian brewer, businessman, councillor, mayor, politician and philanthropist.

== Emigration ==
In 1853 Smith emigrated to South Australia aboard the California and began business as an importer of ironmongery at Adelaide, initially collaborating with his cousin James Alexander Holden. On 25 June 1857 he married Florence Stock, daughter of Robert Stock of Clifton, England. They would have two surviving children before she died in 1862.

== Brewer ==
In 1860 he went into partnership with Edward Logue's brewery on King William Street, Kent Town. When Logue died in 1865, Smith continued the business as Kent Town Brewery. In 1876 he moved the business to the south-eastern corner of Dequetteville Terrace and Rundle Street. In 1888 he amalgamated his business with that of William Knox Simms to form the South Australian Brewing Company.

The malt towers of the old Kent Town Brewery have now been turned into luxury apartments overlooking the Adelaide Park Lands and Adelaide city centre.

== Local government ==
Smith was Mayor of the Town of Kensington and Norwood during the years 1867–70 and 1871–73, and was afterwards elected to the Adelaide City Council. He served three terms as Mayor of Adelaide: in 1879–82, 1886–87 and 1887–88.

== Member of the Legislative Council ==
Smith was elected to the South Australian Legislative Council as member for Southern Districts in 1894 and remained a member until 1902. During the whole of his parliamentary experience he never lost an election.

== Other roles, retirement and death ==
Smith was the founding president of the Kensington and Norwood Institute, and largely responsible for the funding of its building in 1876, now the heritage-listed Norwood Library on The Parade in Norwood.

He was a regular churchgoer and for many years a deacon of Clayton Congregational Church, in Kensington.

Smith died of a cerebral haemorrhage on 25 December 1919 at his home, "The Acacias", in the eastern suburb of Marryatville.

== Family ==
On 25 June 1857, Edwin Smith married Florence Stock (c. 1837 – 12 February 1862), daughter of Robert Stock of Clifton, England, and brother of William Frederick Stock (1847–1913). They had three children:

- Horace Edwin Smith (1858–1858)
- Florence Ida Smith (1859–1932), married George Henry Dean in 1882.
- Sydney Talbot Smith BA LLB (1861– 3 October 1948), married Florence Oliver Chettle (died 21 September 1935), in 1887, with whom he had four children.

Sir Edwin married again, in 1869, to Elizabeth Spicer (died 6 June 1911). This union was childless.

== Legacies ==
=== Sir Edwin and Lady Smith's Gifts, Walsall ===
In 1917, Sir Edwin endowed a gift fund in his native town of Walsall, England, to buy Christmas gifts for the needy elderly of the parish.

=== Norwood Football Club ===
When the Norwood Football Club decided in December 2005 to set up a "Hall of Fame", Smith was appointed one of the 10 non-playing inaugural members. "Sir Edwin Thomas Smith was patron of Norwood from the club’s first day in 1878 until his last, Christmas Day 1919". "More than any other individual, Sir Edwin ensured that the club built its early sporting life on solid foundations". He is known to have discovered a small 2 ounce of gold at Norwood oval in 1902. Edwin donated it to the football club, as well as his old pair of red socks. Ever since, Norwood has been known as the Redlegs.

=== Adelaide Oval ===
The Sir Edwin Smith Stand at the Adelaide Oval was named in his honour in 1922. One of the roads leading up to the Oval is Sir Edwin Smith Way.

== The Acacias ==
Smith bought the property on the corner of Portrush and Kensington Roads, known as The Acacias, in 1878 and made extensive additions and alterations to it. Upon his death in 1919, his home became Loreto Convent, then later Loreto College, Marryatville.
