= W. H. Clark (brewer) =

Brewer (c.1815–1870), founder of Halifax Street Brewery in Adelaide

William Henry Clark (c.1815–1870) was an early settler and brewer in Adelaide, in the Colony of South Australia. He was the founder of the Halifax Street Brewery around 1844 (sold in 1856), and in 1859 was responsible for the building of a brewery at the western end of Hindley Street. However he fell into insolvency, leaving the state in 1860 to avoid his debtors, and the Hindley Street brewery taken over by William Knox Simms, later becoming the West End Brewery.

== Early life ==
William Henry Clark was born in Newry, Ireland, and arrived in South Australia in June 1839 aboard Sir Charles Forbes from Liverpool; the following year he married fellow-passenger Sarah Ann Blakely.

== Halifax Street Brewery ==
He founded the Halifax Street Brewery (also known as the Halifax Brewery) around 1844, and by May 1848 was described as an "enterprising brewer" when he founded a copper mine on land he owned near Strathalbyn.

At the annual meeting of South Australian Justices of the Peace in December 1947, Clark qualified as a Grand Juror, mentioning Halifax Street, Adelaide as his address.

In 1854 he formed a partnership "W. H. Clark & Co." with J. B. Spence, J. H. Parr and Edward Logue, to purchase the Crawford brothers' Hindmarsh Brewery assets in an attempt to reduce competition and increase their client base. The brewery was unpopular with nearby residents due to the stench of the waste liquid discharged into the Gilles Street gutters. Clark built a mill and malthouse on the same side of Halifax Street, with just the Rob Roy Tavern between them.

In March 1856, Clark announced that the Halifax Street Brewery would be run by W. K. Simms & Co. (William Knox Simms) In February 1858, Henry Noltenius bought the Halifax plant, taking on Simms as manager in July, and ran the business until 6 November of that year, when he sold the business to Simms. Noltenius was insolvent by 1860.

=== Halifax brewery after Clark ===
Clark's Halifax Street brewery, after sixteen years lying idle, was revived by W. J. Disher in 1875 as the Imperial brewery, and by 1909 was the site of the Enterprise Boot Factory.

== Other enterprises ==
In 1859, having borrowed money from pastoralist John Haimes, Clark built another brewery at the western end of Hindley Street, which would later become the profitable West End Brewery.

However, not long afterwards Clark was in debt to the bank. Clark's house at Walkerville on the banks of the Torrens was advertised for sale in May 1858.

Further examples of "enterprise" were his subdivision of land at North Adelaide and 650 acres (260 ha) at Gilles Plains, his property on Hindley Street, and the office building he erected on King William Street between Currie and Waymouth streets, later owned by the Bank of Adelaide.

== Later life ==
Clark left South Australia for Melbourne around January 1860, a few months before his insolvency hearing and out of reach of his creditors, leaving W. K. Simms and G. P. Gardner to run the business.

Clark died sometime between 1862 and 1873, but not mentioned in the newspapers of either colony. His death is not registered in South Australia. Nor has his date of birth been established, but it could be assumed he would have been between 20 and 30 years of age when he emigrated and married.

== Family ==
Clark family tree

Edward Clark of Liverpool

  - William Henry Clark (died before 1873) was the second son of Edward Clark of Liverpool; he married
    - Sarah Ann Blakely (1825 – 18 December 1894) on 19 February 1840. They arrived in South Australia aboard Sir Charles Forbes in June 1839. She died in Glenelg, South Australia. Their children included:
      - Jessie Clark (1842 – 8 January 1906) married:
        - Judge William Alfred Wearing (12 November 1816 – 24 February 1875) on 4 October 1860. He died with the wreck of SS Gothenburg; she and their five children left for London shortly after.
      - Anne Glenn "Annie" Clark (4 November 1843 – 4 December 1921) married:
        - Clement Sabine (11 January 1833 – 27 November 1903) on 6 March 1862. By this time W. H. Clark had moved to Melbourne.
      - Edward Clark (1846 – 4 April 1900) married Elizabeth Jones? Wolfe? (died 1874). He married again, to (Harriett Frances) Jane Long (c. 1857 – 11 October 1938) on 11 May 1876. Jane married again, to Oscar John Herbert on 23 July 1914. Edward was also a brewer, owner of East Adelaide Brewing Company, which merged with Walkerville Brewing Cooperative and A. W. & T. L. Ware & Co., owners of Torrenside Brewery, to form Southwark Brewing Company. His large family included:
        - Elizabeth Jones? Wolfe? (died 1874) wife of Edward Clark
          - Mary Glenn Clark (10 December 1868 – 6 October 1954) married Joseph Conigrave (c. 1841 – 3 April 1905) in 1898, his second wife. He died by cutting his own throat.
          - Elinor Joy Clark (1870 – 14 November 1943) married Richard Fordham (c. 1870 – 22 March 1935) in 1895; he died after falling down flight of stairs
        - (Harriett Frances) Jane Long (c. 1857 – 11 October 1938) married on 11 May 1876 to Edward Clark.
          - Stella Ethel Clark (1877–)
          - Edward Blakely Clark (1879–1947)
          - Elsie Muriel Clark (1880– not 1937)
          - Rita Beatrice Clark (27 November 1881 –)
          - George Oscar Murray Clark (27 May 1883 – 1959)
          - Harold Hamilton Clark (1886–) married Lucy Amelia May Devonshire in 1912
          - Stanley Roy Clark (1889–)
          - Eric Gordon Tarcoola Clark (1893–1915)
          - Gwendolyn Gladys Blakely Clark (1896– 1983)
      - William Henry Clark (1846 – 18 December 1875) born in Newry, Armagh, Ireland; married:
        - Jeannie Wilson on 3 March 1871 married William Henry Clark; and died at Brunswick Street, Fitzroy, Victoria His wife had a son six days later.
      - George Clark (11 September 1857 –) was manager of Blanchwater Station.

== See also ==
- Trilby Clark
