= South Australian Brewing Company =

Brewery established in Adelaide in 1888

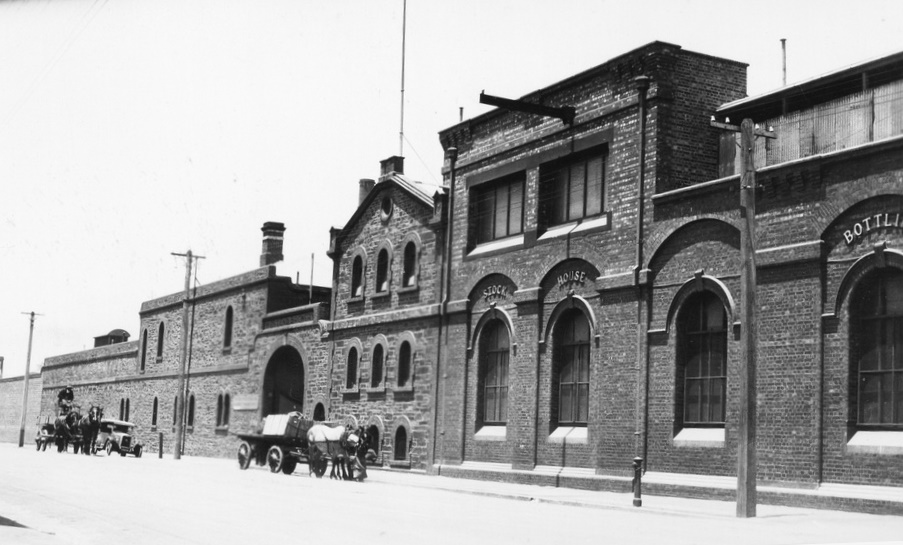
West End brewery building, Hindley Street, S. side c.1920

The South Australian Brewing Company, Limited was a brewery located in Thebarton, an inner-west suburb of Adelaide, South Australia. It is a subsidiary of Lion, which in turn is owned by Kirin, a Japan-based beverage company. It manufactures West End Draught beer.

The company was created in 1888 as the South Australian Brewing, Malting, and Wine and Spirit Company, from an amalgamation of the West End Brewery (in Hindley Street, Adelaide city centre), the Kent Town Brewery, and the wine and spirit merchants Rounsevell & Simms. In 1938 the company took over the Walkerville Brewery, whose main site was at 107 Port Road, Thebarton (the original site of Torrenside Brewery established in 1886). The company's operations continued at its two breweries on Hindley Street and Thebarton, with the Thebarton site becoming known as the Nathan Brewery after the takeover in 1838, then again reverting to its former name, Southwark Brewery, before being rebadged the West End Brewery after the Hindley Street premises closed in 1980.

The Thebarton brewery closed in June 2021.

== 19th century: foundation ==
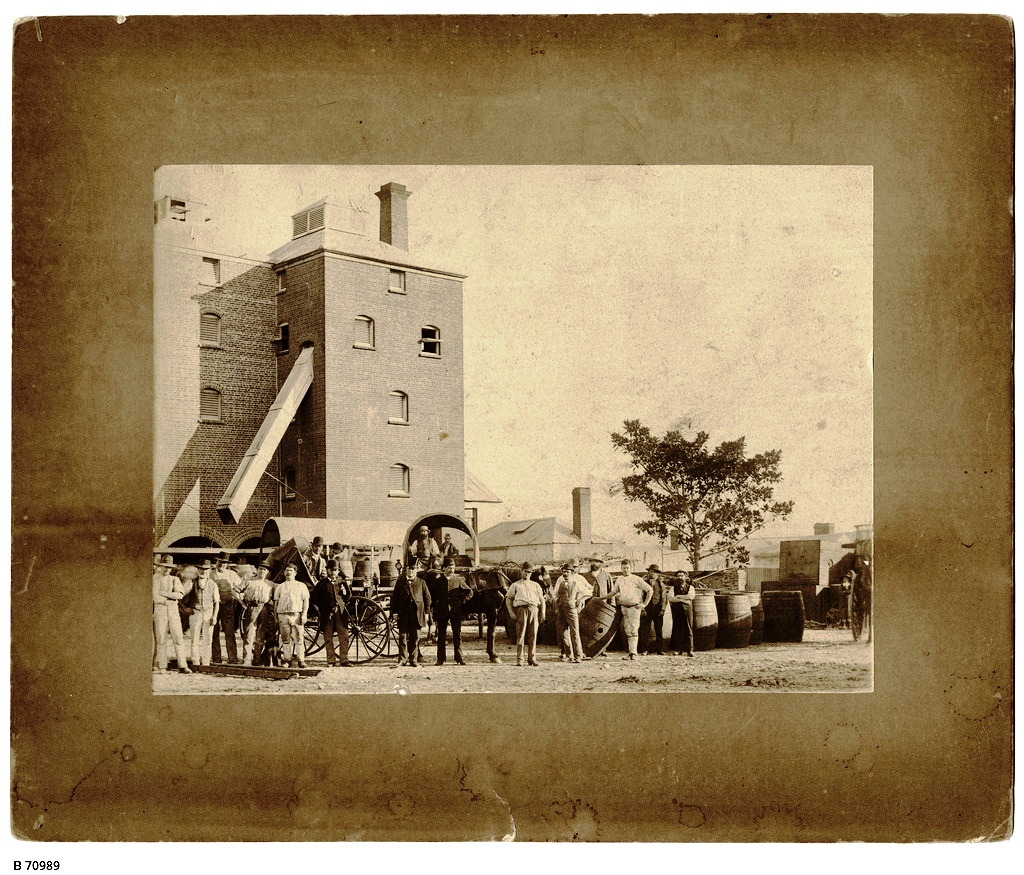
West End Brewery, southern side of Hindley Street West, c.1888

The South Australian Brewing Company was established in February 1888 as the South Australian Brewing, Malting, and Wine and Spirit Company by the amalgamation of Sir Edwin Thomas Smith's Kent Town Brewery, William Knox Simms's West End Brewery and the wine and spirit merchants Rounsevell & Simms (Ben Rounsevell and Alfred Simms). The managing directors of the new company were Robert Alfred Stock, Alfred Simms, and W. B. (Ben) Rounsevell. Provisional directors were Edwin Smith, W. K. Simms, W. B. Rounsevell, R. A. Stock, Alfred Simms, Charles H. T. Hart, and Frank Rymill of Adelaide, and Hon. N. Fitzgerald, John Robb, Malcolm McEacharn, John B. Watson, and John McIlwraith (brother of Thomas McIlwraith), of Melbourne.

The new company set about enlarging the brewing facilities at West End and centring the malting work at Kent Town. It began a campaign of purchasing hotels freehold or leasehold, and by the end of the 1880s had a stranglehold on the Adelaide market, owning 44 hotels and leasing 65. In 1893 they sold off their wine and spirit business to A. E. & F. Tolley Pty Ltd and Milne & Co., and the name was changed to South Australian Brewing Company, Limited.

== 20th century ==
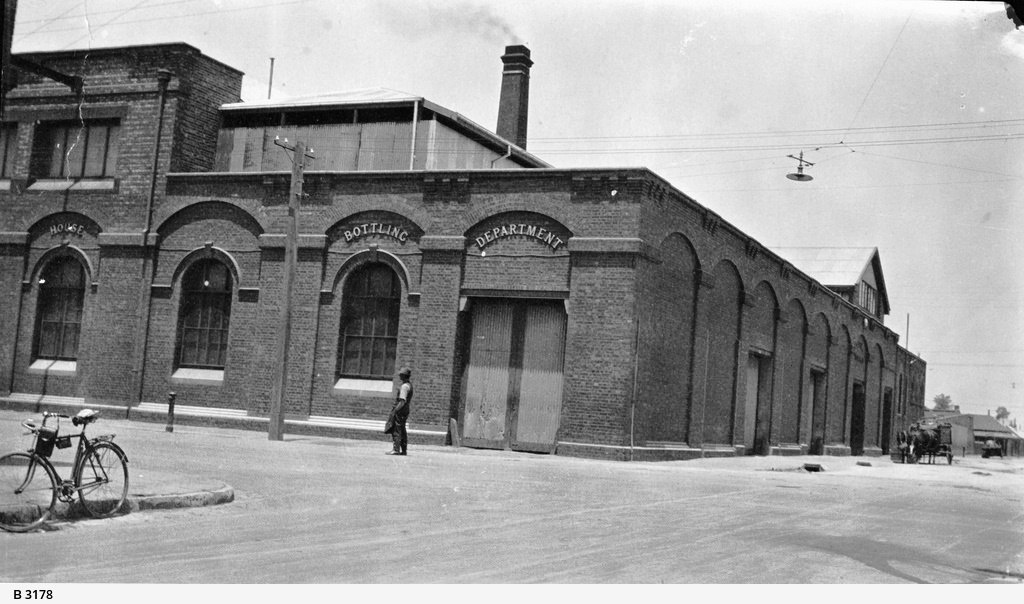
West End Brewery, Adelaide, in 1925

Robert Stock, Edwin Smith's brother-in-law and manager of the Kent Town Brewery, became chairman of the board and general manager of SA Brewing; Stock died in 1904 and Samuel Jacobs served from 1904 to 1937. Jacobs' son (later Sir) Roland Jacobs was managing director from 1948 to 1967.

The black and red colours of the SA Brewing Company came about after the West Adelaide Football Club (whose colours are black and red) defeated Port Adelaide in the South Australian National Football League (SANFL) 1911 Grand Final, and defeated VFL premiers Essendon in the Championship of Australia play-off at Adelaide Oval shortly afterwards in the same year.

In 1927 T. A. Nation was the brewer and G. B. Bryant the general manager. His board of directors comprised S. J. Jacobs (later managing director), Sir Lancelot Stirling, K.C.M.G., Edward Fitzgerald, LL.D., and H. W. Morphett.

=== 1938: Walkerville/Nathan takeover ===
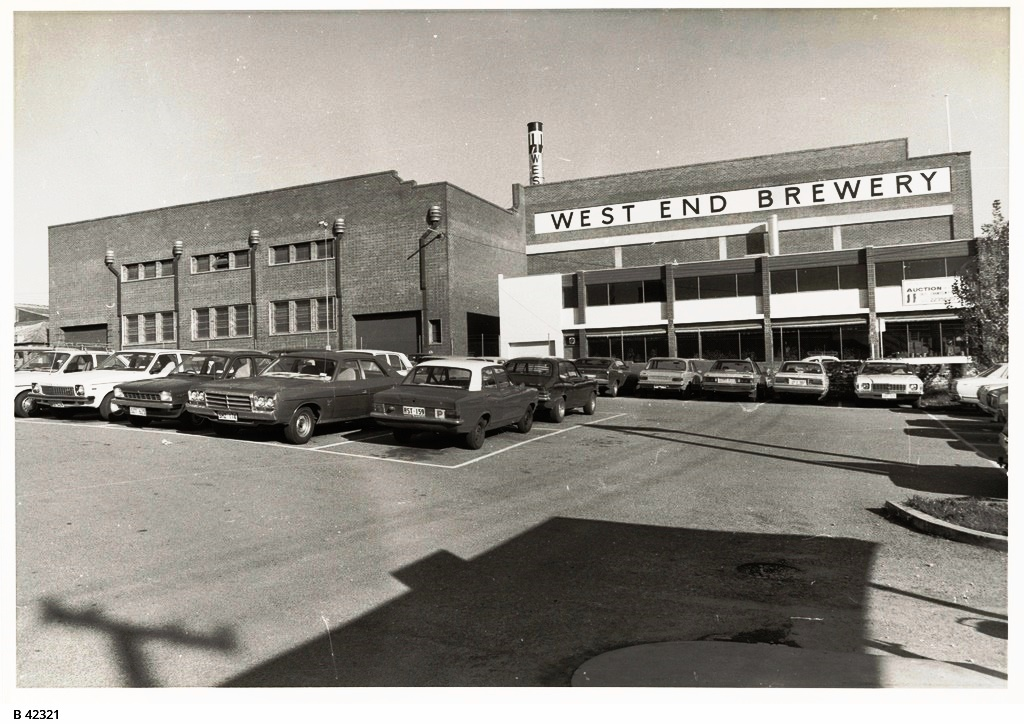
West End Brewery building, 1982

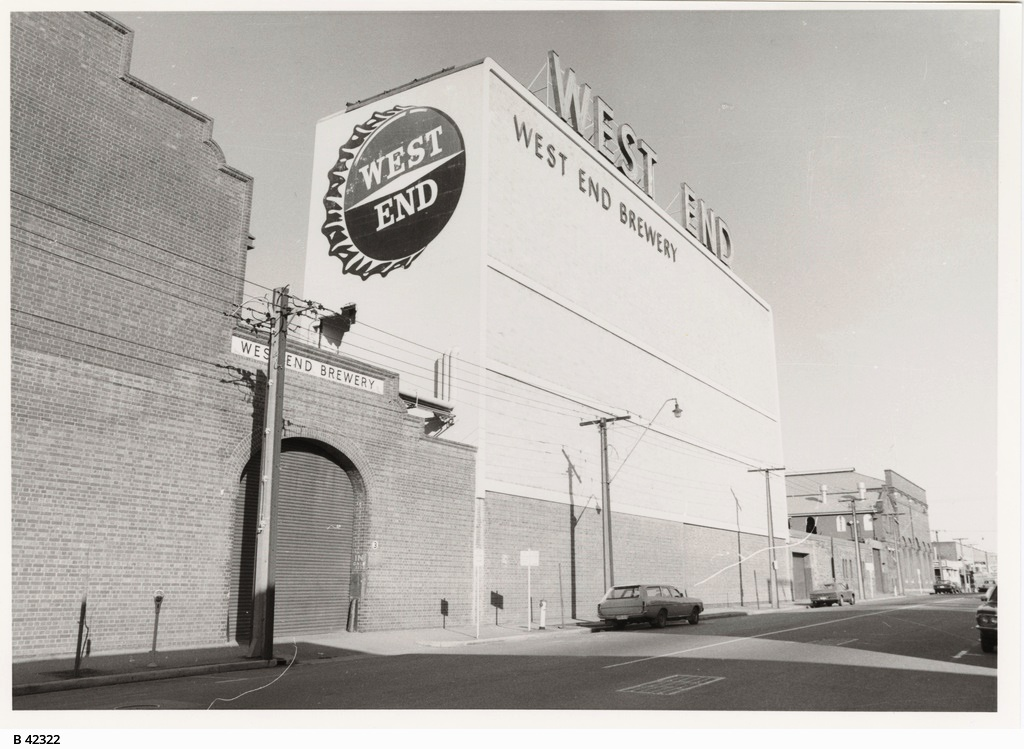
West End Brewery, 1982

The Walkerville Cooperative Brewery, which produced the popular Nathan beers, was taken over by the South Australian Brewing Company in 1938, after which operations were concentrated on the old Torrenside Brewery (established 1886, a precursor of Walkerville Brewery). The brewery was renamed Nathan Brewery to remove the Walkerville's "Southwark" branding in 1939.

In 1941, architect F. Kenneth Milne (who was contracted to the company from 1912 until 1946) was responsible for upgrading the Hindley Street building.

From 1949, the brewery was again renamed Southwark Brewery, administration was centralised at Hindley Street, and in November 1951 Walkerville's Nathan beer (Bitter) was renamed Southwark beer (Bitter). "Southwark Bitter" (actually a lager) became the most well-known product.

From 1955 operations were split between the company's two major factories, with the West End Brewery in Hindley Street making only draught beer in kegs; bottled beer only was produced in the Thebarton plant.

Until 1974, when the Whitlam government revised the Trade Practices Act, they were legally able to dispense only the company's beer in their pubs.

=== 1980: Hindley St site closed ===
In 1980, faced with mounting problems with traffic on West Terrace and ageing and inefficient equipment, not to mention the rapidly increasing value of City land, the original West End Brewery closed and the property sold, operations moved to the Southwark Brewery in Thebarton, which was rebadged "West End". The old Hindley Street building was demolished in 1983, and in 1993, Lion Nathan took over the West End brands.

=== 1993 Lion acquisition ===
Prior to the acquisition of the brewing assets by Lion Nathan in 1993, SA Brewing split its brewing assets into "SA Brewing Holdings", and its diversified operations were formed into a new listed company named Southcorp. One of Southcorp's major assets was "Southcorp Wines", (acquired from the Adelaide Steamship Company in 1990), and subsequently acquired by Lion Nathan's main Australian rival, the Foster's Group.

== 21st century ==
West End Draught was the largest selling beer in South Australia in 2007. West End Draught is a 4.5% abv pale lager, first brewed in 1859.

In October 2020 it was announced that the Thebarton brewery would be closing in June 2021, with the loss of over 90 jobs. It finally closed at close of business on 17 June 2021, with about a third of the workforce, mainly those in sales and sponsorship roles, staying on with the company in South Australia. Artefacts in the on-site museum were catalogued and donated to the State Library of South Australia and other local institutions.

The South Australian Government purchased the 8.4 hectares (21 acres) Thebarton site from Lion Nathan for $61.5 million in 2023, intending to develop it with over 1,000 homes, of which 20% would be economical residential. The site is within 2 km of the CBD, and is well serviced by trams.

The West End Brewery chimney tower has been heritage-listed and will be preserved when the site is redeveloped.

== Football ==
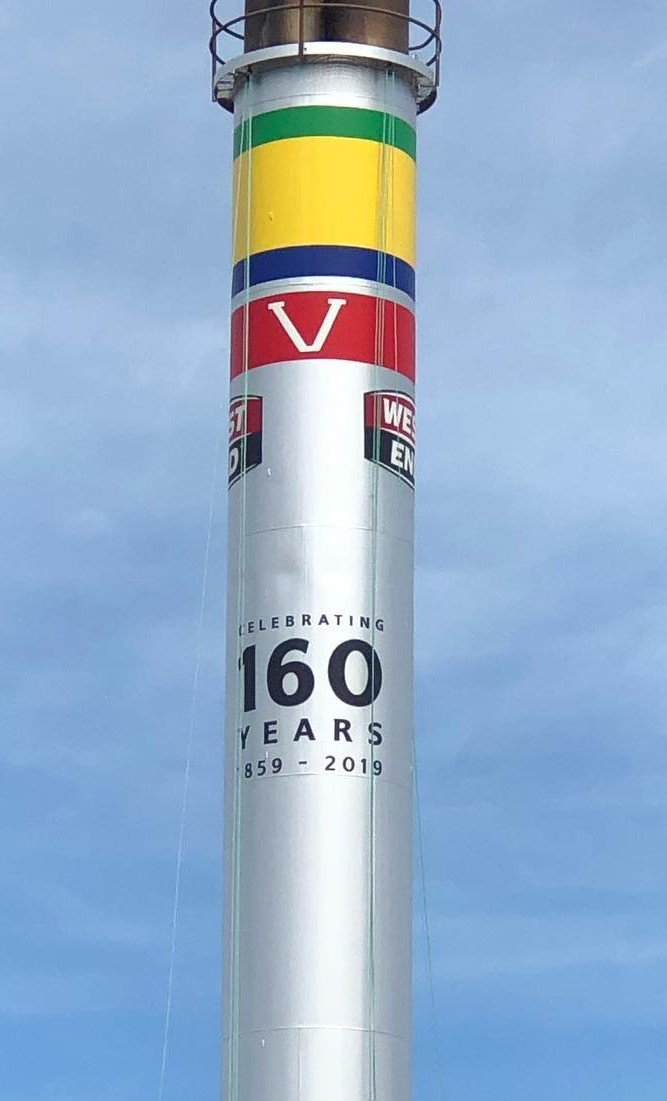
2020 SANFL Premier Woodville West Torrens Eagles' colours above runner up North Adelaide's colours.

=== Chimney-painting ===
The tradition of painting the brewery chimney with the team colours of the South Australian National Football League (SANFL) premiership team began in 1954, when a West Adelaide player and employee Clarrie Cannon suggested painting the chimney in the West Adelaide Football Club colours, red and black, as the West End Brewery (then still in Hindley Street) was located in their territory. General manager C. R. Aitken agreed, but only if West Adelaide was the winning team that year. However Port Adelaide Football Club coach and captain, Fos Williams, said that he expected his team to win, and the men agreed that if Port Adelaide won, their colours would be painted on the chimney. Port Adelaide won that year, so the chimney was painted in black and white vertical stripes, but Williams suggested that a red stripe be painted below the black to honour the runners-up.

The tradition of painting the colours of the premier and runners-up was maintained at the Hindley Street premises until its closure in 1980, before transferring to the Thebarton site, which was rebadged "West End". It continued there until the last finals before the closure of the brewery in 2020, with the Woodville West Torrens Eagles colours aloft. The tradition of painting a chimney in the two teams' colours would continue at the Hoffmann Kiln at the Brickworks Marketplace in nearby Torrensville from 2021, with the cost of the painting continuing to be borne by Lion.

=== AFL Showdown ===
SA Brewing was the original sponsor of the "Showdown" in the Australian Football League in 1997, and is one of the sponsors of the "Slowdown" charity football match.

== See also ==
- Australian pub
- Beer in Australia
- List of breweries in Australia
- South Australian food and drink
