= Henry Noltenius =

Heinrich "Henry" Noltenius (11 August 1820 – 10 January 1884) was a German settler in the British colony of South Australia, and a prominent wine and spirit merchant.

== History ==
Noltenius was born in Bremen, and arrived in South Australia in September 1843 aboard Madras from London.

In 1848 he joined the firm of Joseph Stilling & Co., then in June 1859 left and founded Noltenius and Co., wine and spirit merchants of 75 King William Street.

Noltenius purchased the Halifax Street brewery from W. H. Clark in February 1858, and five months later took on W. K. Simms as a partner, then sold him his share of the business. Both Clark and Noltenius were in debt to the bank. Clark left South Australia for the eastern colonies, out of reach of South Australia's laws, but Noltenius remained.

Noltenius & Co. dissolved around 1882 and he worked as a traveller for W. B. Rounsevell & Co, but his health was failing, and he died two years later.

== Family ==
- Henry Noltenius (c. 1820 – 10 January 1884) married Emma Eliza Payne (2 September 1836 – 5 March 1875) on 1 July 1852. She was the eldest daughter of Samuel Payne of Payneham. They had a home in Bridge Street, Kensington. Their family included:

- Edward Arthur Noltenius (27 March 1853 – 1934) married Martha Marie "Pattie" Hutson ( – 27 March 1929) on 21 May 1878, died at Murray Bridge. Both were buried at Victor Harbor.

- Rev. Harry Edward Noltenius (1879–) married Alice "Waissie" Hosier of Clare on 1902. He retired to Woodend, Victoria.
- (Arthur) Roy Noltenius (1883 – 3 July 1966) married Edith Margaret Dibben (c. 1989 – 7 December 1976) of Pinnaroo on 16 July 1913. Archdeacon Bussell was assisted by Revs. A. E. Dibben and Harry E. Noltenius !, lived at Murray Bridge.

- Henry Charles "Harry" Noltenius (24 August 1855 – 14 May 1875)
- Hermann Edgar Noltenius (12 October 1857 – 2 March 1871)
- Marie Blanche Noltenius (23 July 1859 – ) married Henry Herbert Hoare (c. 1846 – 12 November 1887) in 1878
- Emma Louisa "Louie" Noltenius (10 June 1862 – ) married Edward "Ned" Simms (c. 1864 – 1 September 1909) on 8 May 1890. Ned was the third son of William K. Simms.
- Frederick Augustus "Fred" Noltenius (28 July 1864 – ) "one son studied medicine in Germany"
- Helene Agnes Noltenius (30 July 1866 – 20 July 1920)
- Bernhard Alfred Noltenius (1869–1958) of Kapinga Station near Port Lincoln. Partner with Erskine Latham Randall as Randall & Noltenius 1903–1905. They had a residence at Toorak, South Australia.
- Ernest Wilhelm "Ern" Noltenius (15 May 1872 – 5 May 1937) married Florence Martha Burley ( – 1969) on 11 March 1908.
He had two brothers in Australia:

- Bernhard August Noltenius (c. 1823 – 28 February 1899) founded Noltenius, Meyer & Co., wine and spirit merchants with Christian Ludwig Meyer in Adelaide by 1848, had a similar business at corner of Flinders Lane and Market Square, Melbourne 1852–1856. Both Noltenius and Meyer were proved insolvent in 1857. He had a shop at 31 Currie Street 1884–1887 or later. He left Adelaide, died in Borgfeld, near Bremen. Was he the person listed as "C. B. Noltenius", passenger aboard Leontine arrived August 1848 ?
- Johannes Lebrecht Noltenius (c. 1831 – 9 September 1884) was tobacconist at Beechworth, Victoria around 1858. He managed mines at Montacute and the Barossa Valley. From around 1873 he managed a copper mine at Yam Creek in the Northern Territory, where he died of spear wounds inflicted by Aborigines. A party sent to arrest the culprits and recover stolen property took it on themselves to conduct a reprisal, killing around five Aborigines. "The Alleged Slaughter of Blacks in the Northern Territory". Evening Journal. Vol. XVIII, no. 5207. Adelaide. 12 February 1886. p. 3 – via National Library of Australia.
