= O'Halloran =

- The arms of the (Galway) O'Halloran Clan: gules a horse argent passant saddled and bridled proper, on a chief of the second three martlets [mullets] azure
- Language: English

Origin
- Language: Irish

O'Halloran is the surname of at least two distinct Gaelic-Irish families, one in County Galway and another in south-east County Clare linked to the Dál gCais. On occasions it is translated as "stranger" or "from across the sea". The name states that this family were "importers" and were the lords, and dominant sept of Clan Fergail (Clann Fhearghaile).

In the twelfth century the O'Hallorans were chiefs of twenty-four town lands of the túath of Clan Fergail. These lay east to the river of Galmith (or "Galway"). In the 13th century the O'Hallorans were dispossessed of their ancient inheritance of Clan Fergail by the "De Burgos" (Burke) invaders. The O'Hallorans and the O'Flahertys were obliged to emigrate to Iar (west) Connaught, where they built the castle of O'Hery.

The motto of the Galway family is Clann Fearghaile Abú, which comes from their dynastic name.

Name Variations include: O'Halleron, O'Hollearn, Halloran, Holloran, Hollern, Holleran, Haloran, Hollaran, O'Halleran and in Gaelic, Ó hAllmhuráin or Ó hAlluráin)

== People ==
- Barry O'Halloran, Irish journalist
- Brian O'Halloran, American actor
- David O'Halloran, Australian Rules footballer
- Dustin O'Halloran, American pianist and composer
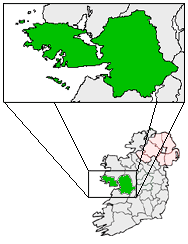
- Galway
  Greg O'Halloran, Irish footballer
- Hal O'Halloran, American radio announcer and singer
- Jack O'Halloran, American boxer and actor
- James O'Halloran (politician), Canadian lawyer and politician
- Joseph O'Halloran, (1763–1843), major-general in the East India Company
- Kay O'Halloran, Australian-born academic
- Keith O'Halloran, Irish footballer
- Kevin O'Halloran (1937–1976), Australian swimmer
- Kevin O'Halloran (Australian rules footballer) (1915–1976), Australian rules footballer
- Kevin O'Halloran (Gaelic footballer) (born 1994), Irish Gaelic football player
- Mark O'Halloran (rugby league), Australian Rugby League player
- Mark O'Halloran (writer), Irish actor and screenwriter
- Martin O'Halloran (fl. 1879–1881), member County Galway Land League
- Michael O'Halloran (disambiguation), several people, including

- Michael O'Halloran (UK politician), English politician
- Michael O'Halloran (footballer), Scottish footballer

- Mick O'Halloran (1893–1960), South Australian politician
- Sharyn O'Halloran, Professor of Political Economics at Columbia University
- Stephen O'Halloran (born 1987), (soccer) footballer with Stalybridge Celtic
- Sylvester O'Halloran (1728–1807), Irish doctor
- Thomas O'Halloran (disambiguation), several people, including:
  - Thomas O'Halloran (Australian footballer) (1904–1956), Australian rules (VFL) footballer playing for Richmond
  - Thomas Shuldham O'Halloran (1797–1870), South Australian police commissioner
  - Thomas Joseph Shuldham O'Halloran (1835–1922), his son, magistrate and minor football identity
  - Thomas Shuldham O'Halloran (lawyer) (1865–1945), his grandson, SAFL football official
- Tom O'Halloran (Australian footballer) (1892–1970), Australian rules (VFL) footballer with South Melbourne
- Tom O'Halloran (climber) (born 1992), Australian professional rock climber
- William O'Halloran (trade unionist) (born c.1870), trade union pioneer in Galway, Ireland
- William O'Halloran (cricketer) (1934–1994), Australian cricketer
- William Littlejohn O'Halloran (1806–1885), British Army officer and public servant in South Australia

== Places ==
- O'Halloran Hill, South Australia
- Halloran Springs, California, a US community in the Mojave Desert

== See also ==
- Tom O'Halleran (born 1946), American politician
- Crichaireacht cinedach nduchasa Muintiri Murchada
- Halloran (disambiguation)
