= Halloran =

Halloran may refer to:

== People ==
- Amy Halloran, American actress
- Antoinette Halloran, Australian operatic soprano
- Ben Halloran (born 1992), Australian international football (soccer) player
- Bob Halloran (disambiguation)
- Brenda Halloran, Canadian politician
- Craig Halloran, (born 1968), American Fiction Author of The "Darkslayer" Series
- Dan Halloran (born 1971), former member of the New York City Council
- Jack Halloran (1916–1997), American composer and choral director
- James Halloran (died 2007), British communication scholar
- Kay Halloran (1937-2026), American politician
- Laurence Hynes Halloran (1765–1831), Australian schoolteacher, journalist, and bigamist
- Lia Halloran (born 1977), American painter and photographer
- Peter Halloran (born 1962), founder and CEO of Pharos Financial Group
- Rei Halloran (born 2006), Japanese-American ice hockey goaltender
- Shawn Halloran (born 1964), American football player, coach, and high school sports administrator
- Walter Halloran (1921–2005), Catholic priest of the Society of Jesus

=== Fictional ===
- Dick Hallorann, a character in the Steven King novel The Shining

== Places ==
- Halloran, New South Wales, Australia
- Halloran, Missouri, United States
- Halloran Springs, California, United States

== Other uses ==
- USS Halloran (DE-305)

== See also ==
- O'Halloran
