= Greensted Hall =

Country House in Essex, UK

Greensted Hall is a large house adjacent to Greensted Church in west Essex, England, comprising two storeys with attics. It is of timber-framing partly covered with a later facing of red brick. As it exists today, most of the house dates from about 1700, when it was largely rebuilt by Alexander Cleeve. The date 1695 is carved on the east front, and a sundial on the south front bears the date 1698 and the initials A and MC (Alexander and Mary Cleeve).

Large alterations were carried out in 1875 by Philip John Budworth: The east front was largely rebuilt, including the central pedimented feature in moulded brickwork. The east and south fronts were faced with red brick, and one of the south wings was extended.

== History ==
Greensted Hall and estate has a long history and has been owned by many different families and individuals. From the time of Edward the Confessor to the close of the 17th century (about 650 years), the Greensted manor and estate has passed through the hands of thirteen distinct families, giving an average ownership of fifty years to each of them.

=== 1100–1200 ===
During the reign of Edward the Confessor, Greensted was held for a manor and two hides by Gotild, however at the time of the survey Hamo Dapifer, an Anglo-Norman royal official under both King William I of England (r. 1066–1087) and his son King William II of England (r. 1087–1100), owned the property until his death in 1107. Hamo Dapifer's niece Isabel FitzHamon, daughter of Robert Fitzhamon (Norman nobleman Lord of Glamorgan), inherited her uncle's estates, and married Robert, 1st Earl of Gloucester, illegitimate son of Henry I. He became in her right Earl of Gloucester, and died in 1147.

Whether King Stephen took this estate from him is not clearly ascertained, but Stephens third son William, the Earl of Mortagne and Surrey gave Greens ted and Chipping Ongar to Richard de Luci, Lord of Diss in Norfolk, who was Lieutenant of the kingdom during Henry 2nd absence in Normandy, in 1166 and Chief Justiciar of England. Richard de Luci died in 1179, Maud de Lucy, Richard's Daughter, who was given by King Jolm in marriage to Richard de Rivers, in 1213, inherited the property.

=== 1200–1300 ===
Greensted remained in the possession of the Rivers family for almost a century, until the commencement of 1300, at which point the estate came into the hands of William de la Hay, the manner of the transaction is unclear, as is how it then passed from William de la Hay's family into the hands of Ralph, Earl of Stafford.

=== 1300–1600 ===
Under the ownership of the Stafford family, the estate was held with numerous manors in Essex, by Robert Bourchier, who possessed it at the time of his death, in 1349. Here for the first time since the Conquest there was a permanency in the tenure of Greensted, as it remained in the Bourchier family over a time of two centuries. Henry Bourchier the last Earl of Essex, who died in 1540 after falling from his horse, was in possession of the estate in the 16th century.

Greensted Estate was then carried in marriage by Henry Bourchier's only daughter and heir Lady Anne Bourchier to William Parr, Marquis of Northampton, and by this marriage, which appears to have been an unfortunate one, the decay of the Bourchier family was brought about. Anne, the last of this branch of the Bourchiers, died in 1570, but in 1548 the dissipation of the Bourchier estates had begun, and in that year Greensted passed into the hands of Sir William Rich, who died in 1566, and shortly afterwards it became the property of William Bourne who also owned part or the whole of the adjoining parish of Bobbingworth.

=== 1600–1700 ===
At the beginning of the 17th century, a family named Young appear to have retained it for about forty years, and then to have sold it in 1661, to Robert Hulson, who held it until 1695.

In the year 1695, Alexander Cleeve, Citizen of London, and Pewterer, purchased the estate of Greensted Hall, at the age of twenty-nine, from the last mentioned Robert Hulson and others having an interest in the sale, together with the Advowson of the living.

=== 1800–1900 ===
Major Robert Hutchinson Ord (1789–1828) grew up here from 1799, married Elizabeth Blagrave, and had seven children. Daughter Julia Warren Ord (14 August 1824 – 21 April 1914) married George Henry Farr (2 July 1819 – 7 February 1904) on 5 February 1846 and migrated to South Australia in 1854 with George's half-sister Edith Bayley. Julia was a noted social worker for whom Adelaide's Julia Farr Centre (previously "Home for Incurables") was named. George (later Canon Farr) was St Peter's College's first Head Master.

=== 1900–2000 ===
During the third quarter of the twentieth century Greensted Hall was home to the Vienna born industrialist-entrepreneur Dr Georg Tugendhat (1898–1973), his wife Máire Tugendhat (1910–1994) and their family.
