= George Wright Hawkes =

Australian churchman and philanthropist

George Wright Hawkes SM (16 September 1821 – 5 January 1908) was a prominent and energetic Anglican churchman and philanthropist in South Australia. He was instrumental in the erection of St Andrew's Church, Walkerville, and St Paul's, Pulteney Street. He was one of the original trustees of St Bartholomew's, Norwood, and St Luke's, Whitmore Square.

== History ==
Hawkes was born at Charlesfort Barracks, Kinsale, County Cork, Ireland. He was the fourth son of Abiathar Hawkes (c. 1785–1861) and his wife Mary Hawkes, of Kingswinford, Staffordshire, England. He was educated for the navy and passed his cadet examination, but was persuaded to instead try his luck in the Australian colonies, and promptly left Portsmouth for Sydney, where he arrived on 22 February 1840. He soon gained employment in the Bank of Australia, and within three years had been promoted to accountant.

In 1846 he took a position with the Union Bank of Australia under John Cunningham McLaren (died 1852), then later that same year resigned to take up a position as bookkeeper to Montefiore & Co. in Adelaide, and arrived there on New Year's Day, 1847.

In May 1852 Hawkes accepted Sir Henry Young's offer of chief clerk in the Treasury, succeeding Alfred Reynell, who had been appointed Gold Commissioner in Victoria. With the advent of responsible government in 1856 he was promoted to Assistant Treasurer. It was part of his duty to give receipts for the cash in the banks and Treasury and bullion in the vaults in charge of George Hamilton, the Commissioner of Police. He received and distributed, under R. R. Torrens, the gold from Alexander Tolmer's first escort from Victoria.

In 1860 Hawkes was appointed to the Police Magistracy at Port Adelaide. After ten years in that position he took charge of nine Courts in country districts. He presided over these for eleven years, and on his retirement was chief guest at a banquet in Gawler, where he was presented with a photo album containing portraits of seventy justices who had sat with him in various courts.

== Church and College ==
=== Sydney ===
Immediately on arrival Hawkes associated himself with the Church of England, and was one of the five-man committee who founded the Church of England Lay Association, which was later deputised by Bishop Broughton to restart construction of St Andrew's Cathedral, which had stalled ten years earlier. Edmund T. Blacket was the architect chosen to put a new church on the old foundations.

Hawkes was also Sunday school teacher at Christ Church, Brickfield Hill under Rev. W. H. Walsh.

=== Adelaide ===
He served as honorary secretary to the Church of England School, located behind Trinity Church, North Terrace, from February 1847 to 1849, during which time he steered the development of the "Proprietary School", which in April 1849 became the Collegiate School of St. Peter (St. Peter's College) and Hawkes was elected its secretary. In 1852 he was elected a governor of the college, and was the only surviving member of the original council when he resigned that position nearly 50 years later.

In 1849 he assisted the Rev. E. K. Miller (died 1911), in founding a Sunday school on Pulteney Street for St John's Church, and was that church's delegate to the South Australian Church Society in 1852. A branch school was started at Unley and superintended by Hawkes, assisted by A. Chance and a Miss Smith.

In 1857 he inaugurated a Sunday school at St Bartholomew's, Norwood. He also served as:

- joint treasurer of Cathedral building fund with Henry Hobhouse Turton
- treasurer and secretary of St John's Mission to the Natives
- treasurer of Dean Farrell's portrait
- treasurer of Bishop Short's pastoral staff
- treasurer of Bishop Short and Dean Farrell's memorial windows in the Cathedral
- treasurer of W. Allen's and seven other memorial windows in St. Peter's College Chapel
- secretary to the Florence Nightingale Nursing Fund
- trustee of the Poonindie Native Institution for 16 years and its strongest defender when pastoral interests demanded its closure
- secretary and treasurer for South Australian Female Refuge for 15 years and on the committee from its foundation
- secretary and Treasurer to the (St. Andrew's) Walkerville School Building Committee in the late 1840s.
- treasurer of St Andrew's Church and School, Walkerville
- treasurer of St Paul's building committee, Adelaide
- member of building committees of Christ Church, North Adelaide, St Jude's, Port Elliot, St Bartholomew's, Norwood, and St Luke's. Adelaide, and trustee of the two last named
- treasurer of Melanesian Mission for the diocese of Adelaide during Bishop Patteson's pastorate
- treasurer for 10 years of the Bishop's Home Mission Society
- Synodsman since the inauguration of the Diocesan Synod around 1855, and at his death its sole surviving member and

representative of the General Synod as lay secretary under Bishops Short, Kennion, and Harmer

- corresponding secretary of Church House
- warden of St Peter's Cathedral
- warden of St John's Church and St. Peter's College Chapel
- treasurer of Bryant C. Stephenson's memorial fund

== Philanthropic ==
Hawkes was

- the first treasurer of the Home for Incurables (later named Julia Farr Centre)
- treasurer and trustee of committee since foundation of Blind and Deaf and Dumb Institution at Brighton; its treasurer for ten years

committee member of the Industrial School for the Blind from its foundation

- committee member of the Aborigines' Friends' Association with Dean Russell and B. A. Moulden
- on the committee of the Flood Relief Fund, Port Adelaide, and the Sailors' Home at the Port
- a member of the Destitute Board

== Other activities ==
Hawkes was also

- a member of the South Australian Volunteer Military Force, serving for six years in the Civil Service Company under Capt. Younghusband, and afterwards Capt. John Howard Clark. He qualified for the marksman's badge, first classification, and on his retirement from the force was given his rifle and a letter of commendation.
- hon. secretary of Art Union of London and South Australia for 21 years
- corresponding secretary of the Royal Colonial Institute, Westminster
- appointed examiner in bookkeeping at the public examinations by Sir Dominic Daly
- offered by Sir Henry Young a seat on the Board of Education, which he declined
- elected a member of the Institute Library
- a member of the South Australian Marine Board

== Recognition ==
Hawkes House, one of the ten houses of St. Peter's College Senior School, was named for him.

== Family ==
George married Edith Jane Stewart Bayley (died in England of a painful internal cancer 8 June 1876) on 18 December 1854. Edith was a half-sister of Rev. George Farr and was a fellow-emigrant with George and Julia Farr aboard Daylesford, arriving in South Australia in July 1854. He married again on 2 May 1883 in Paris, to Jane Leach (died in England November 1923); there were no children by either union. They had a home, "Strelda" on Stanley street, North Adelaide. His remains were buried in the North Road Cemetery.
