= Thomas O'Halloran =

Thomas or Tom O'Halloran may refer to:

- Tom O'Halloran (footballer) (1892–1970), Australian rules (VFL) footballer with South Melbourne
- Tom O'Halloran (climber) (born 1992), Australian climber
- Tom O'Halloran (musician), Australian musician
- Thomas O'Halloran (footballer) (1904–1956) Australian rules (VFL) footballer playing for Richmond
- Thomas A. O'Halloran (1931–2015), American particle physicist
- Thomas Shuldham O'Halloran (1797–1870), South Australian police commissioner
- T. J. S. O'Halloran (1835–1922), his son, magistrate and minor football identity
- Thomas Shuldham O'Halloran (lawyer) (1865–1945), his grandson, SAFL football official

== See also ==
- Tom O'Halleran (born 1946), American politician
