= D. Bruce Ross =

Australian Supreme Court judge

Sir Dudley Bruce Ross KC (21 May 1892 – 19 November 1984), generally referred to as Bruce or D. Bruce Ross, was an Australian judge of the Supreme Court of South Australia from 1952 to 1963. He served in both World Wars, and was knighted in 1962.

== Early life and education ==
Dudley Bruce Ross was born on 21 May 1892 in the Adelaide suburb of North Adelaide, the only son of William Alexander Ross (died 28 October 1894) and Annie Isabella Ross, née O'Halloran (27 April 1863 – February 1937), who married on 8 May 1888. His father died when he was very young, and he was brought up by his mother, a granddaughter of Thomas Shuldham O'Halloran, in the home of her father T. J. S. O'Halloran at 177 Childers Street, North Adelaide.

He attended Queen's School, North Adelaide, followed by St Peter's College. He then studied law at the University of Adelaide, graduated LLB, and was admitted to the bar on 17 December 1914.

== WW1 ==
Ross enlisted with the Australian Army on 29 February 1916 and embarked from Melbourne with reinforcements for 120 Howitzer Battery on 2 October. He served in France and Belgium as a gunner with the 13th Field Artillery Brigade, with 113 Howitzer Battery, later 51 Artillery Battery and 50 Battery. He returned to Australia and was discharged from the AIF on 4 December 1919.

== Career ==
In 1921 Ross joined with his uncle T. S. O'Halloran in partnership as O'Halloran & Ross.

He was a member of the Council of Law Society from 1936 to 1952, and its president from 1947–1949.

During the Second World War, Ross served as a legal officer, with the rank of captain.

He was appointed King's Counsel in 1952. He was appointed to the Supreme Court Bench on 20 November 1952, where he served as judge until 21 May 1963.

== Other interests and activities ==
Ross was initiated into the SA Freemasons on 14 Nov 1921 in the St Peter's Collegiate Lodge, and was a Grand Master of his lodge from 1959 to 1964.

He was a member of the Anglican Church and served as chancellor for the Diocese of Adelaide and of Willochra for 27 years. He was president of the Law Society of South Australia from 1947 to 1959, of the Church of England Boys Home from 1945 to 1973, and of the Kindergarten Union of South Australia.

== Honours ==
In 1953 Ross was presented with a Queen Elizabeth II Coronation Medal.

He was created a Knight Bachelor in the 1962 New Year Honours.

== Personal life ==
Ross married Margaret Eleanor Waterhouse (6 June 1891 – 20 November 1848) on 21 July 1920. Margaret was a daughter of Herbert Whitney Waterhouse (1860–1928), closely associated with the Cheer-Up Society (as was T.J.S. O'Halloran) and Minda Home. They had a home in Collinswood.

== Death ==
He died on 19 November 1984. His remains were buried in the North Road Cemetery.
