= Julia Farr =

English-born South Australian philanthropist (1789–1828)

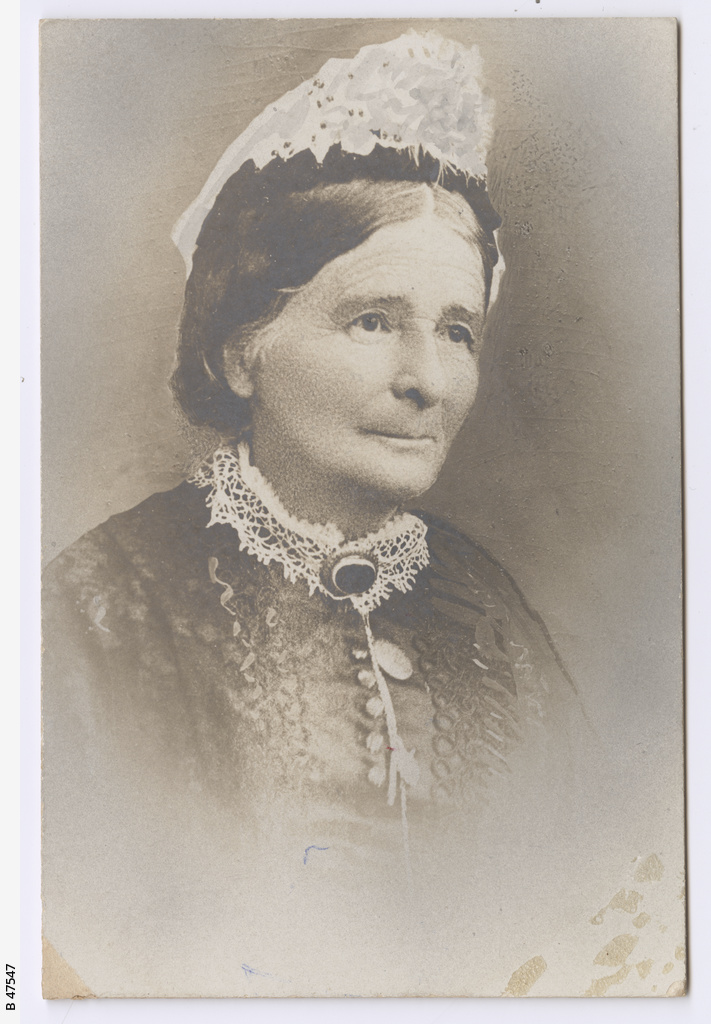
- Born: 14 August 1824
- Occupation: Charity worker
- Spouse(s): George Henry Farr

Julia Warren Farr née Ord (14 August 1824 – 21 April 1914) was an English-born South Australian philanthropist.

== History ==
Julia was a daughter of Major Robert Hutchinson Ord (1789–1828), whose family were associated with Greensted Hall, Essex, and his wife Elizabeth Ord (née Blagrave). She was young when her parents died and she and her siblings went to live with an uncle.

She married (Anglican) Rev. George Henry Farr, Vicar of St. Wenn's Church in Cornwall, in 1846 after a four-year engagement, the delay being occasioned by her uncle's disapproval, the Ords being Plymouth Brethren and in much wealthier circumstances.

In 1854 George Henry Farr was offered the position of headmaster of St Peter's College, Adelaide, which he promptly accepted, hoping the drier climate of South Australia would improve his wife's delicate health. George and Julia, their six-year-old daughter Eleanora and Julia's half-sister Edith Bayley sailed to South Australia aboard Daylesford, arriving in Adelaide in July 1854 after a long four-month voyage during which an outbreak of measles affected the children, the ship ran out of provisions, and the captain, missing the entrance to Gulf St Vincent, nearly ran the ship aground at the Murray Mouth.

Their first few weeks did not augur well for life in the new colony: the ship's Adelaide agent had gone broke and the captain had to borrow money from passengers before he could continue to Melbourne. The only transportation they could find at the port was an old cart that broke down in Hindley Street and the women had to put up for the night at a temperance hotel (George had been taken to the college the previous day by the government health officer). The next day was Sunday and Julia Farr and Edith Bayley were expected at the 11 am service at the College chapel, but they could not find a cab and had to walk the two miles of what must have been rudimentary, and possibly muddy, tracks in their best clothes. The Farrs' accommodation was not yet habitable and they had to board with Mrs Baye, the college matron.

Farr assumed responsibility for running the boarding school for the College, overseeing the dairy and poultry that supplied the kitchen.

== Philanthropy ==
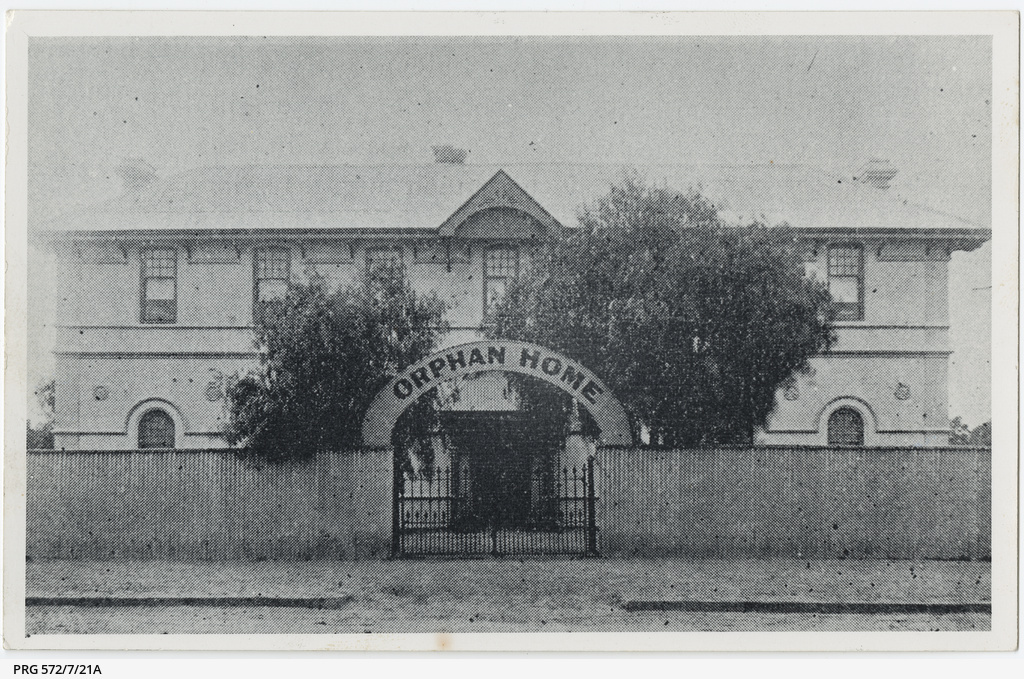
The frontage of the Orphan Home for Girls in Carrington Street, Adelaide.

Farr was concerned at the plight of orphaned girls who had been committed to the Adelaide Destitute Asylum, an unsatisfactory situation in many ways. She organised a group of like-minded friends and founded the Church of England's Orphan Home for Girls. Located near the corner of Carrington Street and East Terrace, previously a German hospital, it opened in October 1861. The all female founding committee consisted of Millicent Short (wife of the first Bishop of Adelaide), Mrs. Jane Kent Hughes, Lady Amelia 'Emily' Grace Cooper, (wife of Chief Justice Charles Cooper), a Mrs. Prankerd, Stuckey and Farr.

The girls were looked after, fed, clothed and educated to the age of 14, then most found employment as servants to middle-class households. The first secretary of the Home was H. Kent Hughes, and matron Mrs. Sarah Birt. The Home was relocated to 588 Fullarton Road, Mitcham in August 1909, after the management of the home bought the residence of T. O'Halloran Giles (son of pastoralist Thomas Giles). The Home was renamed Farr House in honour of Julia Farr 1935 and closed in 1982.

Farr was also concerned with alleviating problems for people with intractable physical problems, and set about establishing the Home for Incurables. A committee was formed in 1878 and a house on Fisher Street, Fullarton was purchased. Over the years, as demand increased, new buildings were added, and wings were appended to those. A section of the complex was demolished in 2011 and some retirement homes were built on that piece of land.

Julia Farr died at her residence on Barnard street, North Adelaide, after an extended period of ill-health. She is buried with her husband at North Road Cemetery, Nailsworth.

Her daughter Julia, granddaughter Mary Clift, and great-granddaughter Joan Clift followed her in succession as committee members of the Orphan Home.

== Other interests ==
The Farrs purchased a property near Tea Tree Gully and built there a holiday house, dubbed "Brightlands". Dr. William T. Angove initially used Brightlands' extensive cellars to mature his wines before moving to the St. Agnes property.

== Recognition ==
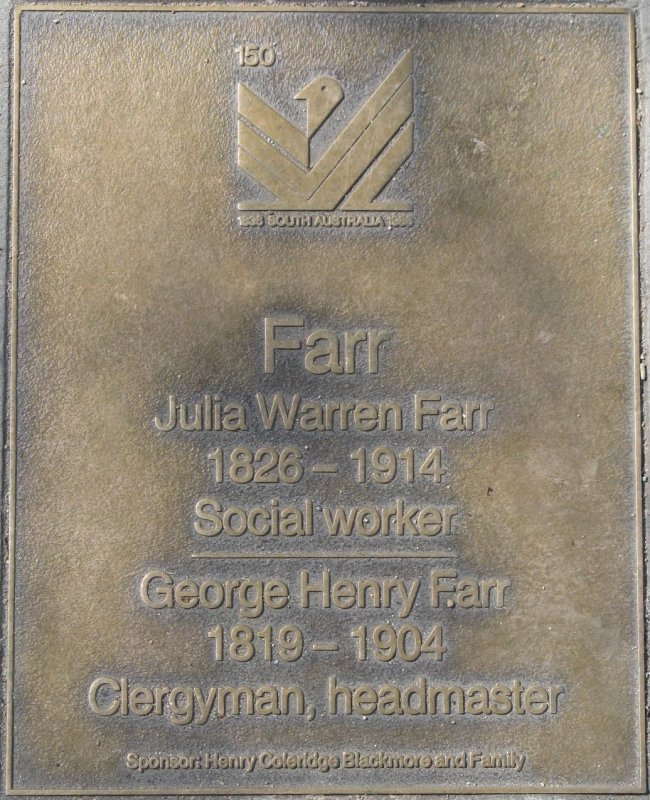
- Jubilee 150 Walkway Plaque commemorating Julia Warren Farr and George Henry Farr.
  Each year the Annual General Meeting of the Church of England Orphan Home for Girls was held on 14 April (Sundays excepted), in recognition of her birthday.
- The Orphan Home for Girls at 588 Fullarton Road, Mitcham was named Farr House in 1935.
- She was accorded the privilege of, on 13 October 1906, laying the foundation stone of the new wing of the Home for Incurables at 99 Fisher Street, Fullarton.
- The Home for Incurables was renamed Julia Farr Centre in 1981.

== Family ==
Julia Warren Ord (1824–1914) married George Henry Farr (2 July 1819 – 7 February 1904) on 5 February 1846. Their children included:

- Eleanora Elizabeth Farr (1847–1901) married Edwin Gordon Blackmore (1837 – 1909) in 1872

- Lewis Gordon Blackmore (21 May 1886 – 23 July 1916) was an Australian rules footballer who played with Essendon in the Victorian Football League (VFL).

- Mary Edith Patteson Farr ( – ) married (William) Hey Sharp (c. 1845 – 3 February 1928), later known as Canon Sharp, warden of St Paul's College, University of Sydney, on 17 June 1876.
- Lewis Henry Ord Farr (1859 – 20 November 1912) married Mabel Beatrice Steward Bruce in 1901. He was a surveyor of Teatree Gully, later of Port Lincoln. He disappeared from the vessel Rupara, presumed drowned, while travelling to Streaky Bay on business. Suicide was not suspected. He had "a family of four or five children" including:

- Mary Stuart Ord Farr (3 September 1896 – ) married Lawrence Clift, of Guntur, India, in Colombo on 22 December 1921.
- (Lewis Henry) Bruce Farr (1 May 1901 – 1969) engaged to (Eva) Marion Ffloyd Chomley of North Bungaree in July 1940, married outside SA.
- Henry Coleridge Farr (1902– ) granted Land Agent's licence in 1937; living at Church terrace, Walkerville.

- Gertrude Margaret Farr (1862–1956) studied art, exhibited at least once.
- Julia Coleridge Farr (1864 – 7 October 1951) also studied art, became missionary on Norfolk Island. She was author of Early Days at St. Peter's.

- (Clinton) Coleridge Farr (22 May 1866 – 27 January 1943) married Maud Ellen Haydon at Papanui on 22 April 1903. He was a noted physicist and academic in New Zealand.

It is likely that Muriel Farr OBE (1914–1968), who may have been an Orphan Home committee member in 1919, was unrelated. She was organizing secretary for the Australasian National League, secretary for the Wattle Day League, activist for equal pay for women, the Liberal Union, and the (later Royal) Society for the Prevention of Cruelty to Animals. She was awarded an OBE in 1918. Muriel was a daughter of Edmund Arnold Farr ( –1957) who married Mildred Elizabeth Booker on 25 April 1905; he was the eldest son of Joseph Farr of Kings Walden, Hertfordshire, and a manager at G. & R. Wills & Co., then partner Charles Birks & Co.

Edith Jane Stewart Bayley (George's half-sister, died in London on 8 June 1876) married George Wright Hawkes (16 September 1828 – 5 January 1908) on 18 December 1854.
