= Philip Ray (cricketer) =

English cricketer

Philip William Ray (1806 – 23 January 1880) was an English cricketer with amateur status. He was associated with Cambridge University and made his debut in 1827. He was educated at Bury St Edmunds Grammar School and Clare College, Cambridge. He became a Church of England priest and was rector of Greensted from 1837 until his death.

== Bibliography ==
- Haygarth, Arthur (1996) [1862]. Scores & Biographies, Volume 1 (1744–1826). Kennington: Frederick Lillywhite. ISBN 978-19-00592-23-9.
- Haygarth, Arthur (1997) [1862]. Scores & Biographies, Volume 2 (1827–1840). Kennington: Frederick Lillywhite. ISBN 978-19-00592-23-9.
