= William O'Halloran =

William O'Halloran may refer to:

- William O'Halloran (trade unionist), pioneer of trade unionism in Galway, Ireland
- William O'Halloran (cricketer), Australian cricketer
- William Littlejohn O'Halloran, British Army officer and public servant in South Australia
