= Charles Budworth =

British Army officer (1869–1921)

Major-General Charles Budworth CB CMG MVO
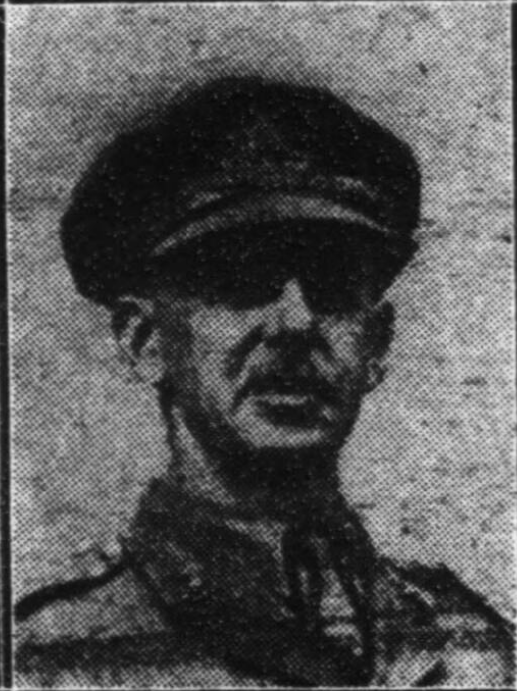
- Budworth in group photo with HM The King at the Allied HQ in Flixecourt, France, in August 1918
- Born: 3 October 1869; Greensted Hall, Greensted, Essex, England
- Died: 15 July 1921 (aged 51); Simla, India
- Burial place: Simla Old Cemetery
- Spouse: Helen Blewitt
- Relatives: Richard Budworth (brother); David Budworth (son); Philip John Budworth (father)
- Military career
- Allegiance: United Kingdom
- Branch: British Army
- Service years: 1889–1921
- Rank: Major-General
- Unit: Royal Field Artillery
- Commands: 59th (2nd North Midland) Division
- Conflicts: Second Boer War; First World War
- Awards: Companion of the Order of the Bath; Companion of the Order of St Michael and St George; Member of the Royal Victorian Order; Mentioned in Despatches (10); Commander of the Legion of Honour (France); Croix de guerre (France); Order of Saint Stanislaus (Russia)

Major-General Charles Edward Dutton Budworth, CB, CMG, MVO (3 October 1869 – 15 July 1921) was a British soldier who served as an artillery officer during the Second Boer War and the First World War.

== Early life and family ==
Budworth was the son of Philip John Budworth, of Greensted Hall, Essex. His elder brother Richard Budworth played international rugby union football for England.

Budworth married Winifred Nickalls, daughter of Sir Patteson Nickalls, but was widowed in 1914. He remarried Helen Blewitt, daughter of W. E. Blewitt, in 1918. They had two sons.

== Military career ==
Budworth was commissioned a second lieutenant in the Royal Field Artillery on 15 February 1889, promoted to lieutenant on 15 February 1892, and to captain on 29 March 1899 In October that year he was appointed adjutant of the Honourable Artillery Company of London (HAC), and on 12 January 1900 he commissioned as a captain in the HAC company of the City of London Imperial Volunteers (CIV) bound for service in the Second Boer War. He left for South Africa the following month, and returned with most of the corps in October the same year. The CIV was disbanded in December 1900, and he went back to regular service with the Royal Artillery. He received the 1902 King Edward VII Coronation Medal for his service with the HAC during the coronation.

During the First World War he was promoted, in October 1914, to lieutenant colonel. In July 1915 he succeeded Major General Edward Fanshawe as brigadier general, Royal Artillery of the 1st Division of the British Expeditionary Force, and was given the temporary rank of brigadier general while employed as such. He was Lieutenant General Sir Henry Rawlinson's senior artillery adviser, at IV Corps (October 1915 to March 1916) and at Fourth Army from May 1916, when he was promoted to major general, until the armistice with Germany in November 1918. He played a key role in the Allied Hundred Days Offensive at the Battles of Hamel, Amiens, and the final attack on the Hindenburg Line. He was ten times mentioned in despatches.

In 1919 Budworth, having been promoted to major general in January, was appointed to command 59th (2nd North Midland) Division, which trained drafts for service in Egypt and the Black Sea until it was demobilised.

Budworth became Inspector of Royal Artillery in India and was still serving in that role when he died in Simla, British India, on 15 July 1921; he was buried in Simla Old Cemetery.

Military offices
Preceded by Nevill Smyth	GOC 59th (2nd North Midland) Division; July–September 1919	Succeeded by Division disbanded
