= Richard Budworth =

English rugby union player

- Born: Richard Thomas Dutton Budworth; 17 October 1867 Greensted, England
- Died: 7 December 1937 (aged 70) London, England
- School: Christ College, Brecon
- University: Magdalen College, Oxford
- Notable relative(s): Philip John Budworth (Father), Charles Budworth (Brother)
- Occupation(s): school teacher priest

Rugby union career
- Position: Forward
Amateur team(s)
| Years | Team | Apps | (Points) |
| 1887-1890 | Oxford University RFC | | |
| 1890-? | Blackheath F.C. | | |
| 1890-1892 | Barbarian F.C. | | |
- London Welsh RFC
- Northampton
| – | Clifton Rugby Football Club | | |
International career
| Years | Team | Apps | (Points) |
| 1890-1891 | England | 3 | (1) |

Richard Thomas Dutton Budworth (17 October 1867 – 7 December 1937) was an English rugby union forward who played club rugby for Blackheath and international rugby for England. In 1890 Budworth became one of the original members of the Barbarians Football Club.

== Personal history ==
Budworth was born in 1867 in Greensted, Essex, to Philip John Budworth and Annie Emily Thomas. He was educated at Christ College, Brecon, before matriculating to Magdalen College, Oxford. Upon leaving university he taught at Lancing College in West Sussex and then between 1898 and 1907 at Clifton College. He eventually settled in the North of England becoming headmaster of Durham School (1907 to 1932). During his teaching profession Budworth entered the priesthood and was ordained in 1902, before becoming a canon at Durham Cathedral.

== Rugby career ==
Budworth first came to note as a rugby player when he represented Oxford University while studying at Magdalen College. He played in three Varsity Matches, from 1887 to 1889 winning his sporting 'Blues'. During the 1889/90 season and now playing for Blackheath, Budworth was first selected for the England national team, playing in the first English game of the 1890 Home Nations Championship. The English team, although talented, was fairly inexperienced after they missed the previous two Championships. In windy and snowy conditions, England lost to Wales at Crown Flatt in Dewsbury. Budworth then missed the two remaining games of the Championship, but was reselected for the 1891 Championship for the encounters with Wales and Scotland. After away victories over Wales and then Ireland, the later of which Budworth missed, the England team faced the Scottish in the tournament decider. Despite great early performances from the pack, against Scotland the forwards were routed and the Scottish won in a convincing manner. Budworth never represented his country again.

As well as his international career, Budworth was also of note in the field of rugby football as he was one of the original members of the invitational touring team, the Barbarians. He played in their inaugural match at Hartlepool in 1890 and went on to represent the side on five occasions, competing in his last match in 1892 against the Corinthians.

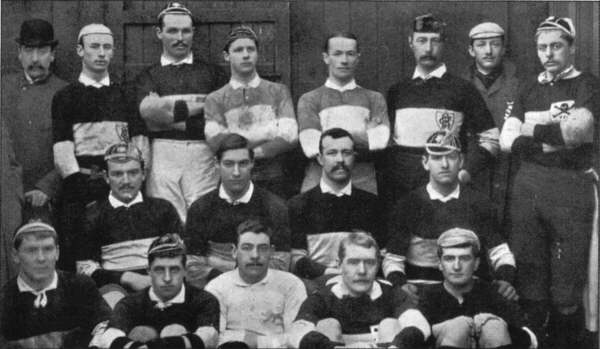
The Barbarians in 1891, Budworth is stood far right with skull and crossbones badge on his jersey

== Bibliography ==
- Griffiths, John (1987). The Phoenix Book of International Rugby Records. London: Phoenix House. ISBN 0-460-07003-7.
- Jenkins, Vivian (1981). Rothmans Rugby Yearbook 1981-82. Aylesbury: Rothmans Publications Ltd. ISBN 0-907574-05-X.
