= George Henry Farr =

Australian Anglican clergyman (1819–1904)

The Venerable George Henry Farr (2 July 1819 – 7 February 1904) was a British born Australian Anglican priest; headmaster of St Peter's College from 1854 to 1879.

== History ==
Farr was born in Tottenham, London, a son of John Farr, and was admitted to Christ's Hospital school shortly after his eighth birthday, the youngest boy in the school of 700 students; the future Sir H. S. Maine, and Canon Buckle of Wells, were fellow-students. At age 15 he won a school exhibition for Cambridge University, but was forced by illness to defer his going up to Cambridge until he was 20. As an undergraduate of Pembroke College he served as oar-captain and stroke of the Pembroke Eight, a sport he continued to participate in with some success after he graduated in 1843 in both classics and mathematics. With an eye on a career in Law, he entered the Middle Temple, and after graduating read with a leading conveyancer, but abandoned his studies to take holy orders. He was ordained deacon in 1844 and priest the following year by the Bishop of Exeter. He was eight years in Cornwall, serving at Redruth and St Buryan, and for a time the cure of Stapleton, in the diocese of Gloucester and Bristol.

In 1854 he was offered the position of headmaster of St Peter's College, Adelaide, which he promptly accepted. He had in 1846 married Julia Warren Ord (1824–1914), a daughter of Sir Robert Hutchinson Ord, of Grimstead Hall, Essex, and their eldest daughter Eleanora (1847–1901) was suffering consumption, and it was hoped a warmer drier climate would benefit her health. They left Plymouth on 8 April 1854 and arrived in Adelaide aboard Daylesford in July 1854. The college was in its infancy, with only two habitable classrooms, and a dining hall that doubled as the chapel. There were two masters and 70 students. For 25 years Farr served as head, with conspicuous ability and success. Among those he influenced were Sir Denzil Ibbetson, Ven. Archdeacon W. J. Bussell, Rev. C. S. Hornabrook, George Leake (Premier of Western Australia), Sir John C. Bray; Sir John Downer, Dr. E. C. Stirling, Sir Lancelot Stirling, Dr. W. B. Blue; Sir Richard Butler, J. S. O'Halloran, T. J. S. O'Halloran (father of T. S. O'Halloran), and A. Buchanan.

Three years after his arrival in Adelaide he was appointed Canon of St Peter's Cathedral, serving in that position concurrently with his college duties, and assisted in laying its foundation stone on 29 June 1869.

In 1879 Dr. Farr resigned from St Peter's College, and in 1880 was appointed Archdeacon of the missionary districts in the Diocese of Adelaide. He then served as incumbent of St Bede's, Semaphore; St Michael's, Mitcham; and St Luke's, Whitmore Square, Adelaide, where he served for 12 years.

Farr helped found the University of Adelaide, and served as warden 1880–1882 and Vice-Chancellor 1887–1893. He continued to serve on the council until his retirement in 1896. He was also an active member of the board of the Public Library, Museum, and Art Gallery, being Chairman on three occasions between 1869 and 1886. He was also one of the 82 founding members of the Royal Geographical Society of South Australia in 1885.

In 1896, his health failing, he took a long holiday on Norfolk Island, where one of his daughters was a missionary.

He died at his residence in North Adelaide after some nine years of failing health. His remains were buried at the North Road Cemetery, followed by his wife's ten years later.

== Family ==
George Henry Farr married Julia Warren Ord (14 August 1824 – 21 April 1914) on 5 February 1846. Julia was a daughter of Sir Robert Hutchinson Ord, of Grimstead Hall, Essex, and a noted social worker for whom Adelaide's Julia Farr Centre (previously "Home for Incurables") was named. Their children included:

- Eleanora Elizabeth Farr (1847–1901) married Edwin Gordon Blackmore (1837–1909) in 1872
- Mary Edith Patteson Farr ( c.1858–1948) married William Hey Sharp (1845–1928) in 1876. He was better known as Canon Sharp, warden of St Paul's College, University of Sydney, later Canon of St Andrew's Cathedral, Sydney
- Lewis (or Louis) Henry Ord Farr (1859–1912), of Port Lincoln
- Gertrude Margaret Farr (1862–1956)
- Julia Coleridge Farr (1864–1951), member of Melanesia Mission
- Clinton Coleridge Farr (22 May 1866 – 27 January 1943) geophysicist and academic in New Zealand

The Rev. John Coleridge Patteson was a cousin.
