= Philip John Budworth =

English magistrate (1819–1885)

Phillip John Budworth
- Born: 1819; High Laver, Essex
- Died: 9 January 1885 (aged 65–66)
- Notable work: Memorials of the Parish's of Greenstead-Budworth, Chipping Ongar and High Laver with an account of the Cleeve and Budworth Families
- Spouse(s): Blanche Trimmer, Anne Emily Thomas
- Children: Charles Budworth, Richard Budworth
- Father: Philip Budworth

Captain Philip John Budworth (1819 – 9 January 1885), of Greensted Hall, was an English magistrate and one-time Deputy Lieutenant of Essex.

== Personal History ==
Philip John Budworth was born in High Laver, Essex, the son of Elizabeth Darby and the Reverend Philip Budworth Rev Budworth was, Rector of High Laver. His mother Elizabeth was the daughter of Rev. John Darby of Bowes House.

Budworth was educated at Eton College and served as a captain in the Essex Rifles.

He died on 9 January 1885 in Greensted, Essex, at the age of 66.

== Career ==
Budworth was the High Sheriff of Essex in the year 1878.

He was the author of Memorials of the Parish's of Greenstead-Budworth, Chipping Ongar and High Laver with an account of the Cleeve and Budworth Families, a history of the parishes at Greenstead, at Ongar, and at High Laver in Essex County, as well as histories of the Cleeve and Budworth families between the early 1100s and 1876.

== Greensted Hall ==
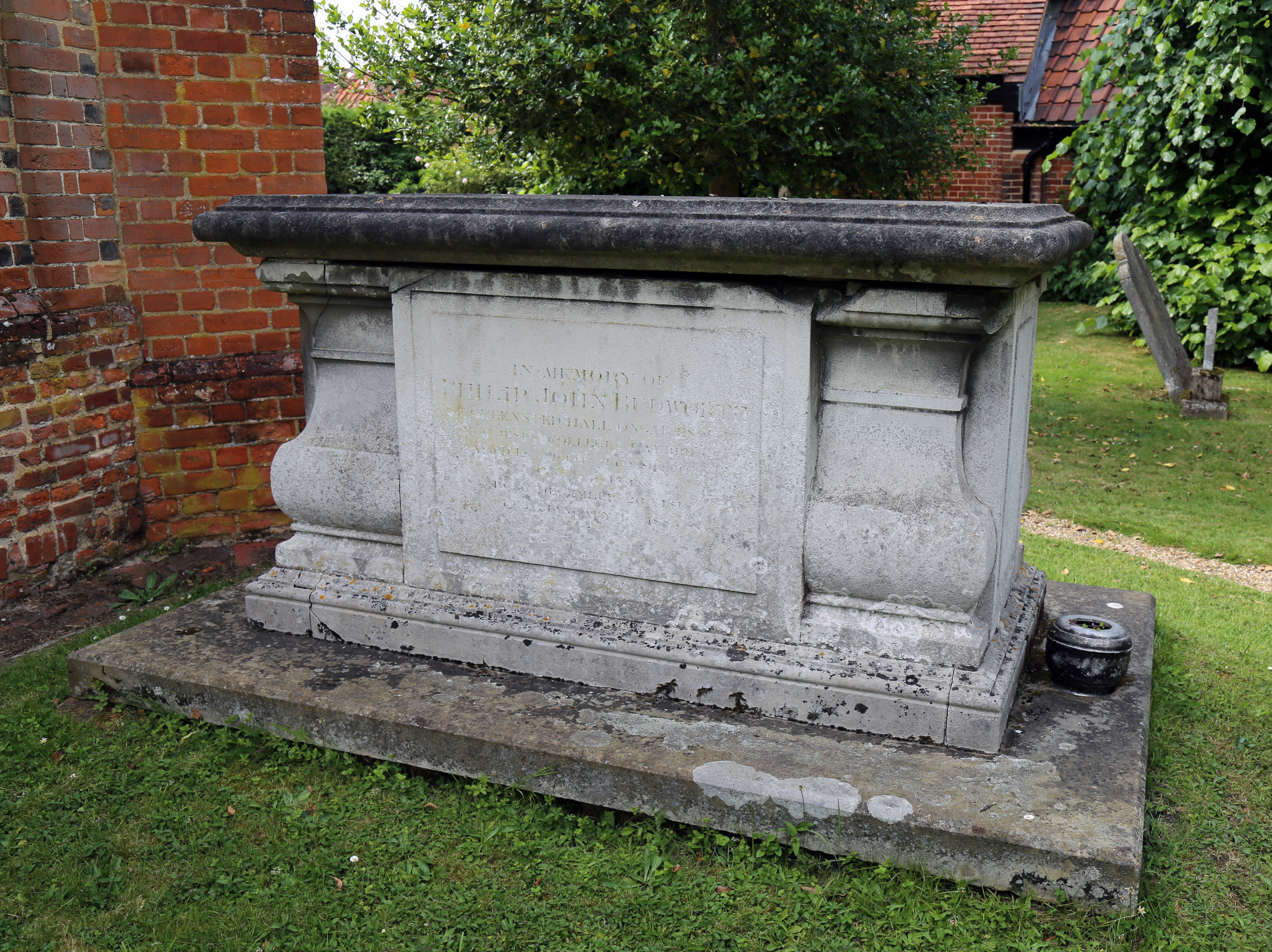
Philip John Budworth Tomb

Alexander Cleeve, a London businessman and administrator of Gambia, bought Greenstead hall and its estate in 1695. Reverend Philip Budworth was a great-grandson of Cleeve, and inherited the estate, buying up other lands in the area and taking most of the manor back into the family. Captain Philip J Budworth, as the Reverend's only son, inherited the hall and lands and made it his family home in 1854. He bought more property in the area and held most of the parish lands. As an active member of local society and affairs, he was commemorated at Chipping Ongar through the building of a local community hall, Budworth Hall, in his name.

== Budworth Hall ==
The Budworth Hall was built in 1886 and named after Captain Budworth. It contained a large assembly room, reading-rooms, and coffee rooms. A clock tower was added in 1887 and a museum in 1898. The hall still fulfils its original purpose as a centre for functions, meetings, and music. It has been managed since 1968 by the Ongar and District Community Association and serves as its home.
