= Galway Workers' and General Labourers' Union =

The Galway Workers and General Labourers Union was established in July 1911 by William O'Halloran, as founding secretary, and a number of other dock labourers. Within a short period, following discussions with James O'Connor Kessack, it was absorbed by the Liverpool-based National Union of Dock Labourers, later the Amalgamated Transport and General Workers Union
