= George Frederick Claridge =

Australian businessman and philanthropist

George Frederick Claridge (24 October 1852 – 27 April 1931) was a South Australian businessman and philanthropist, longtime chairman of the Home for Incurables.

== History ==
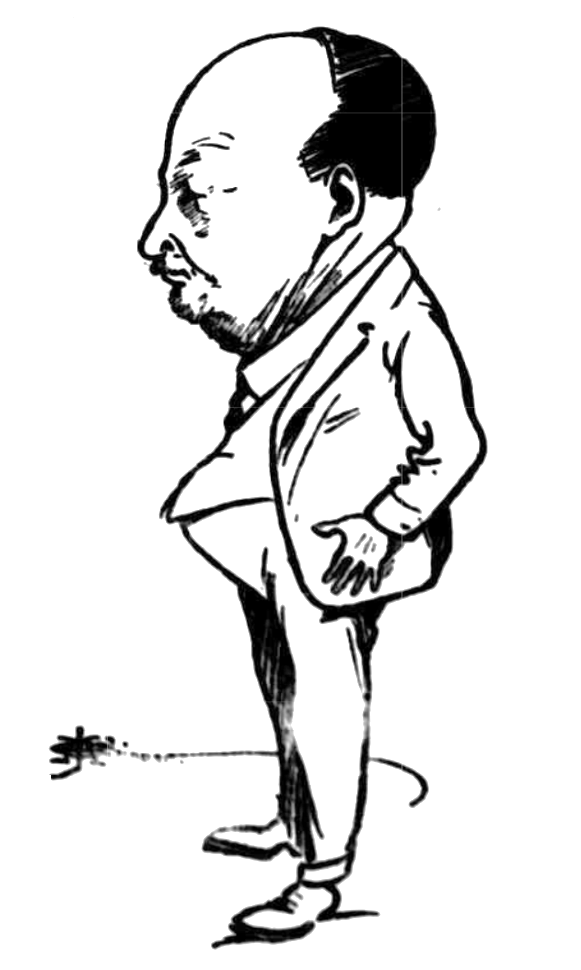
caricature by J. H. Chinner

Claridge was born in Bicester, Oxfordshire, the second son of Samuel Frederick Claridge and Annie Claridge, née Chinner. Her parents were early colonists of South Australia who had prospered and were on a return visit to England when the couple married. They too settled in the new colony, arriving at Adelaide in 1854, and had a home in William Street, Norwood. Claridge was educated at Thomas Caterer's Commercial College in Beaumont. After leaving school he served four years' apprenticeship with Palmer & Tolley's drapery shop at 55 Rundle Street, then his father's business, Claridge & Sons, a general store in Auburn.

S. F. Claridge was partner with Charles Wylde as Wylde & Claridge, which took over the drapery business of Parkin & Chinner at 30 Rundle Street in August 1859. (Note: W. Parkin owned the three-storey building at 30 Rundle Street, and was business partner with George Williams Chinner (died 1880), Annie Claridge's brother. The caricaturist J. H. Chinner was a son.) They sold that business to John Winnall in December 1865 and moved to 46A Rundle Street. In October 1868 the partnership broke up and Wylde (Note: Charles Wylde (c. 1825–1901) was a cousin of G. W. Chinner and a brother of Annie Claridge. and father of organist Harold Wylde.) took over the business.

S. F. Claridge and his family then moved to Auburn and took over the local general store as Claridge & Sons. The business prospered and they opened branches in Redhill and Crystal Brook.

Claridge moved from Redhill to Auburn in 1884, then in 1890 took charge of the Port Pirie store. He became one of the town's leading citizens, serving as mayor for two years and founding a local branch of the District Trained Nursing Society.

In those years Claridge was involved in politics as a Liberal, in which cause he contested elections for the districts of Stanley and Wooroora, but without success. He was mayor of Port Pirie 1898-1899.

In 1900 they sold the Port Pirie business and Claridge moved to the city, residing in Burnside, later at Kent Town, and for the last nine or ten years in Gilberton.

He became involved in several charitable and benevolent organisations:

- He was appointed to the Destitute Board, and remained a member on its reorganisation as the Children's Welfare and Public Relief Department, on occasion acting as chairman.
- He was an active member of the Home for Incurables committee; treasurer for five years, and chairman for 25 years. He was delegated to lay the foundation stone for the McInerney Hall.

He was a member of the

- Adelaide and Midland Licensing Benches and the Special Licensing Bench, presumably representing Christian teetotalers;
- Adelaide Hospital advisory board; and the
- State Children's Council.

He was a lifelong member of the Methodist Church, notably during his Port Pirie years and at the Kent Town church for the next thirty years.

He was also a director of Claridge House Ltd.

== Family ==
Samuel Frederick Claridge (c. 1823 – 23 June 1893) married Annie Chinner ( – 12 April 1903), daughter of John Chinner of Angaston, in London. Their children were;

- Philip Henry Claridge (17 May 1851 – 27 April 1939) married Hannah Bray, daughter of Samuel Bray, on 19 September 1878; he had Crystal Brook store

- Philip Rupert Claridge (1884– )

- George Frederick Claridge (24 October 1852 – 27 April 1931) had Port Pirie store; married Lilla Newman ( – 1922) of North Adelaide on 24 September 1877.

- (Florence) Mabel Claridge (1879–1972)
- Hedley George Claridge (1881–1957)
- (Agnes) Olive Claridge (1883–1960)

They had a home in Gilberton.

- Emily Jane Claridge (11 February 1857 – ) married Sidney Heywood Rowe on 9 May 1883, moved to Melbourne
- John Theophilus Claridge (29 April 1859 – ) had Auburn store
- Alfred Augustus Claridge (31 January 1861 – July 1896) had Redhill store
- Agnes Mary Claridge (19 August 1863 – ) married Rev. John Henry Goss on 3 April 1899
- Herbert James Claridge (22 March 1865 – 23 May 1955) married Florence Rose Wood on 12 April 1893. He was partner in Roland & Claridge store in Laura.
- Florence Brewerton Claridge (3 January 1867 – ) married Samuel Ford, lived in Auburn
