= Lewis Blackmore =

Australian rules footballer

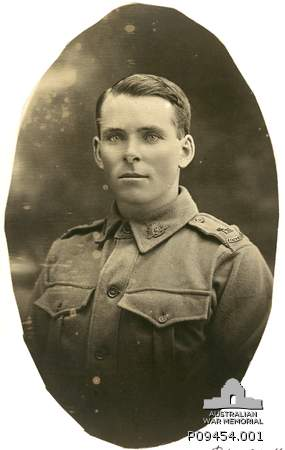
- Second Lieutenant Blackmore, First Battalion, AIF, France 1916

Personal information
- Full name: Lewis Gordon Blackmore
- Born: 21 May 1886; College Park, South Australia
- Died: 23 July 1916 (aged 30); Pozières, France
- Original team: Melbourne Grammar

Playing career^{1}
Years	Club	Games (Goals)
1905–07	Essendon	7 (10)
- ^{1} Playing statistics correct to the end of 1907.

Lewis Gordon Blackmore (21 May 1886 – 23 July 1916) was an Australian rules footballer who played with Essendon in the Victorian Football League (VFL).

== Family and early life ==
Blackmore's father, Edwin Gordon Blackmore (1837–1909), an Englishman from Bath, the son of a doctor, had fought as a volunteer in the "Maori Wars" with the Taranaki Rifle Volunteer Corps from 1863 to 1864, and had moved to South Australia and had established himself in Adelaide. He was a co-founder of the Adelaide Club, the Adelaide Hunt Club, and served the Clerk of the South Australian Legislative Council from 1886 and, later, served as the Clerk of the Federal Parliaments.

Blackmore's mother, Eleanora Elizabeth Farr (1847–1901), was the eldest daughter of ven. Archdeacon George Henry Farr (1819–1904), M.A., LL.D. and Julia Warren Ord.

Blackmore had four older brothers, Gordon Patteson Blackmore (1872–1941), George Edward Blackmore (1874–1936), James Gairdner Blackmore (1876–?), Edwin Ord Blackmore (1879–?), two older sisters, Jane Gordon Drummond Blackmore (later, Mrs. Granville Sharp) (1881–1942), Eleanor Mary Blackmore (1884–1891), and one younger brother, John Coleridge Blackmore (1888–?). His older brother Quartermaster Sergeant George Edward Blackmore (No.85), had served in the Boer War with the Third South Australian Citizens' Bushmen Contingent.

== Education ==
He attended St Peter's College, Adelaide, and moved to Melbourne Grammar School in 1903. He was a prefect at Melbourne Grammar, and played cricket and football for the school's First XI and First XVIII in 1904. and 1905.

In 1906, Blackmore entered Trinity College, and began a study of engineering at the University of Melbourne. While at the university, he was awarded a "full blue" in cricket.

== Footballer ==
Recruited from Melbourne Grammar School, when still a student there, he played on the forward line, and kicked four goals from five shots in his first senior game against St Kilda, at the Junction Oval on 2 September 1905. He played in the next two games, the last match of the season, and the first Semi-Final, both against Fitzroy. Fitzroy won both matches. Blackmore kicked one of Essendon's four goals in each of the matches.

He played in the second, third and fourth games of the 1906 season, and in the second game of the 1907 season.

== Soldier ==
Prior to his enlistment he was farmer and grazier, working with his brother, John Coleridge Blackmore, at Wattamondara, near Cowra, in New South Wales. He enlisted in Adelaide on 23 September 1914; seven weeks after the declaration of war.

On 21 December, having finished his basic training, he was promoted from Trooper to Lance Corporal; and, on that same day, as part of the 6th Light Horse Regiment, A Troop, A Squadron, he embarked from Sydney on board HMAT Suevic (A29).

After further training in Egypt, he was sent to Gallipoli, where he was wounded in action (on 14 July 1915); among other injuries he had a broken right arm.

He was evacuated to Malta; and whilst there, in the September, he contracted "enteric fever" (typhoid). He was immediately sent to Cardiff, Wales, in the UK to recover and, once he was well enough to do so, he returned to his unit, in Egypt, in January 1916.

== Death ==
Second Lieutenant Blackmore was killed by machine gun fire in France, just after midnight, whilst taking part in an attacking advance as part of the 1st Infantry Battalion during the Battle of Pozières on the morning of Sunday, 23 July 1916. He was hit in the forehead by a machine gun bullet and died instantly, at 30 years of age.

His body was never identified, and the precise location of his grave is unknown. He is commemorated at the Villers–Bretonneux Australian National Memorial, in France.

== See also ==
- List of Victorian Football League players who died on active service
