= Tom O'Halloran (musician) =

Australian musician

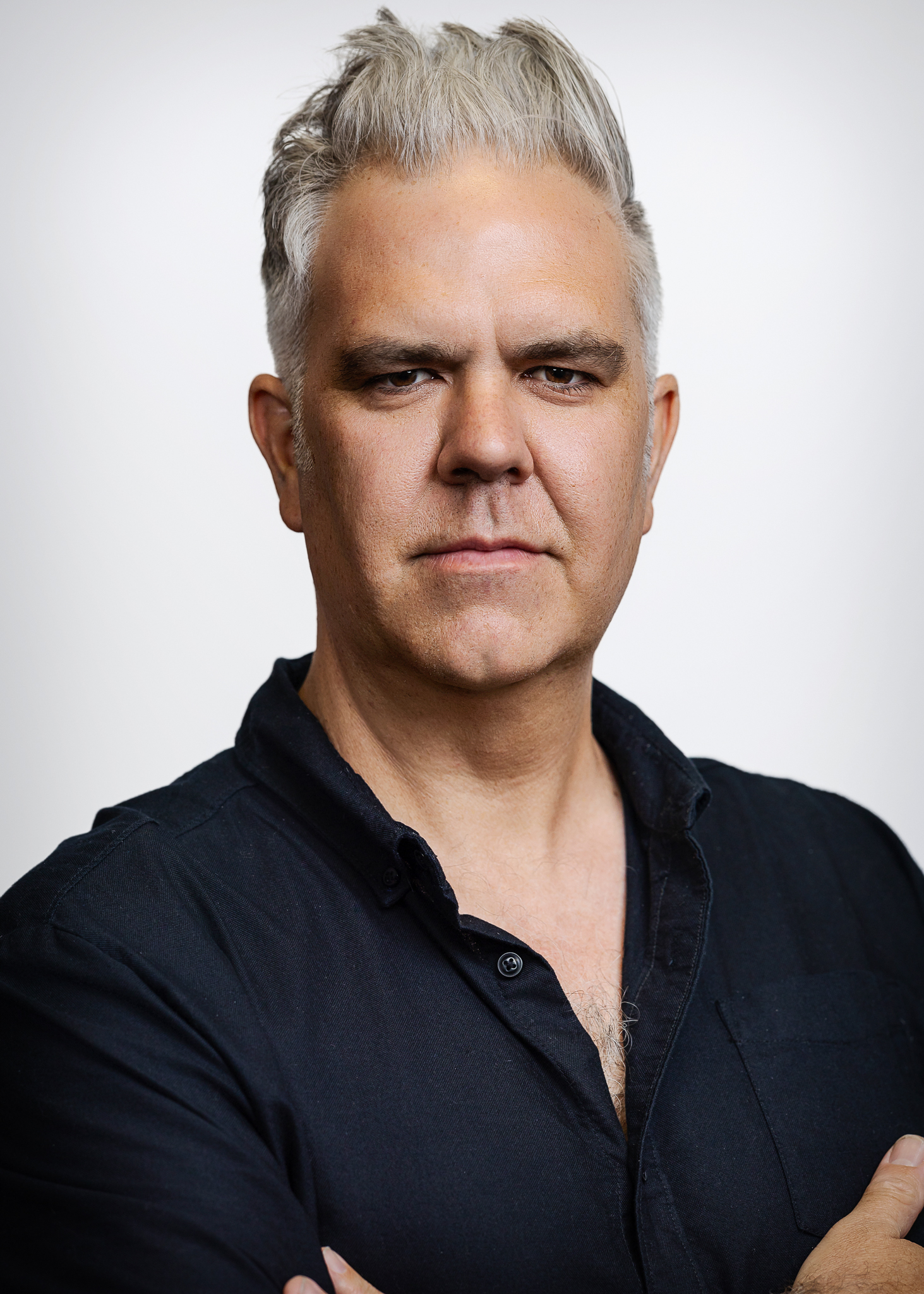

Background information
- Genres: Jazz, Classical
- Occupations: Pianist, composer, conductor
- Website: tomohalloran.com.au

Tom O'Halloran is an Australian jazz pianist, composer and conductor. He is a Senior Lecturer and head of the Jazz Piano department at the Western Australian Academy of Performing Arts (WAAPA) at Edith Cowan University.

== Discography ==
| Title | Details |
|---|---|
| Green Hills and White Clouds | Released: 2007 |
| We Happy Few | Released: 2009 |
| Now Noise | Released: 2016 |
| My Name is Nobody | Released: 2017 |
| Axiom | Released: 2021 |
| TLC | Released: 2021 |

== Awards and nominations ==
=== Art Music Awards ===
The Art Music Awards are presented each year by the Australasian Performing Right Association (APRA AMCOS) and the Australian Music Centre (AMC).

| Year | Category | Work | Result | Ref. |
|---|---|---|---|---|
| 2012 | Award for Excellence in Jazz | For Piano Perspectives concert performance of Dissolve for two pianos | Nominated (Finalist) | |
| 2017 | Jazz Work of the Year | Now Noise | Won | |

=== Freedman Jazz Fellowship ===
This award is offered each year to young Australian musicians to enable them to execute a particular project.

| Year | Result | Ref. |
|---|---|---|
| 2003 | Nominated (Finalist) | |
| 2011 | Nominated (Finalist) | |

=== Limelight Awards ===
The Limelight Awards were given annually to recordings and personnel in Australian classical and jazz music.

| Year | Category | Work | Result | Ref. |
|---|---|---|---|---|
| 2009 | Best Jazz Recording | Tom O’Halloran Trio, We Happy Few | Won | |

=== West Australian Music Industry Awards ===
The West Australian Music Industry Awards (commonly known as WAMis) are annual music industry awards for the State of Western Australia.

| Year | Category | Result | Ref. |
|---|---|---|---|
| 2014 | Best Jazz Artist | Won | |
