= USS Halloran =

Evarts-class destroyer escort of the United States Navy

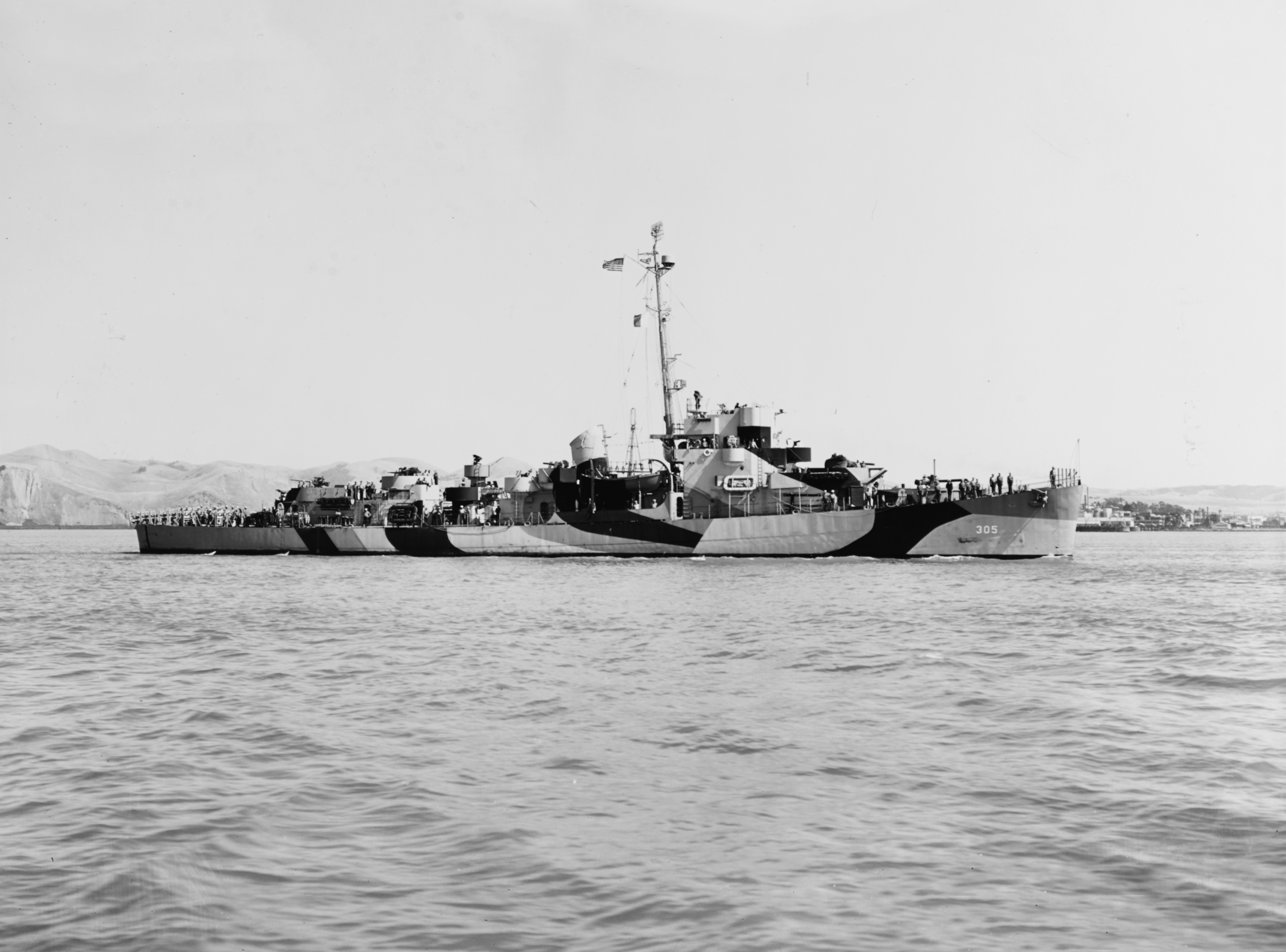
- Halloran on 7 June 1944

History

United States
- Name: USS Halloran
- Builder: Mare Island Navy Yard
- Laid down: 21 June 1943
- Launched: 14 January 1944
- Commissioned: 27 May 1944
- Decommissioned: 2 November 1945
- Stricken: 28 November 1945
- Honors and awards: 3 battle stars (World War II)
- Fate: Sold for scrapping, 7 March 1947

General characteristics
- Type: Evarts-class destroyer escort
- Displacement: 1,140 long tons (1,158 t)
- Length: 289 ft 5 in (88.21 m)
- Beam: 35 ft 1 in (10.69 m)
- Draft: 8 ft 3 in (2.51 m)
- Propulsion: 4 × General Motors Model 16-278A diesel engines with electric drive, 6,000 shp (4,474 kW); 2 screws
- Speed: 21 knots (39 km/h; 24 mph)
- Complement: 156
- Armament: 3 × single 3"/50 Mk.22 dual purpose guns; 1 × quad 1.1"/75 Mk.2 AA gun; 9 × 20 mm Mk.4 AA guns; 1 × Hedgehog Projector Mk.10 (144 rounds); 8 × Mk.6 depth charge projectors; 2 × Mk.9 depth charge tracks

USS Halloran (DE-305) was a Evarts-class destroyer escort of the United States Navy.

== Design ==
The Evarts-class destroyer escorts were 289 ft 5 in (88.21 m) long overall, and they had a beam of 35 ft 2 in (10.72 m). They had an average draft of 10 ft 1 in (3.07 m) at their full load displacement of 1,416 long tons (1,439 t). Each ship had a normal crew numbered 156 officers and sailors.

Halloran was propelled by a pair of diesel motors manufactured by General Motors, which drove a pair of screw propellers. Her propulsion system was rated to produce 6,000 brake horsepower (4,500 kW) for a top speed of 19.5 knots (36.1 km/h; 22.4 mph). Oil storage amounted to between 131 and 197 long tons (133 and 200 t), which allowed a cruising radius of up to 6,000 nautical miles (11,000 km; 6,900 mi) at an economical pace of 10 knots (19 km/h; 12 mph).

The ship's armament consisted of a main battery of three 3-inch (76 mm) /50-caliber guns in individual pivot mounts, which could be used against air or surface targets. These were supported by a light anti-aircraft battery that initially consisted of four 1.1 in (28 mm) /75-caliber guns in a quadruple mount and nine 20 mm (0.79 in) Oerlikon guns. For attacks against submarines, the ship was equipped with a Hedgehog mortar, eight depth charge throwers, and two depth charge racks.

== Service history ==
Halloran was laid down by Mare Island Navy Yard, Vallejo, California, on 21 June 1943. The ship was named after William Halloran, an officer killed aboard USS Arizona during the attack on Pearl Harbor. Halloran was launched on 14 January 1944, sponsored by the namesake's mother. The ship was commissioned on 27 May 1944. After shakedown, Halloran departed California as a convoy escort on 31 July arriving Pearl Harbor on 9 August.

Sailing for Eniwetok on 16 August, she arrived on 24 August and two days later she became part of the escort screen for fast oiler replenishment group steaming to the Western Pacific. Based at Manus, and later Ulithi, Halloran continued this duty until on 29 November, helping to bring vital fuel to fleet units off Palau, Yap, and Luzon. While moored at Ulithi on 20 November, she witnessed the torpedoing of oiler Mississinewa (AO-59) and in company with Rail (AM-26) searched the harbor fruitlessly for a suspected midget submarine. From 5 to 7 December, Halloran screened two escort carriers transporting replacement aircraft to Manus, and on 14 December she sailed to escort tankers to Eniwetok. She departed on 19 December for Pearl Harbor, arriving Christmas Eve.

Halloran was underway again on 22 January 1945, this time as a unit of the escort screen for the amphibious task force designated to capture Iwo Jima. After patrolling the area around the training site at Saipan, she served as a barrier patrol ship during the actual landings on 19 February. She continued this duty until 28 February when, she departed with a convoy. Steaming via Saipan and Tulagi, she reached Espiritu Santo on 15 March. The far-steaming destroyer escort's next assignment was with the Okinawa assault forces. Departing Espiritu Santo on 25 March, she arrived off Okinawa on 9 April and began vital anti-submarine barrier patrols.

She repelled six attacking Japanese aircraft on 12 April, splashing one and damaging two others, and was narrowly missed by a torpedo on 20 April. After performing various other duties, including assistance to the stricken Isherwood (DD-520) and escort duty to Saipan and 'back, she resumed her barrier patrols on 30 May. A kamikaze aircraft attacked Halloran on 21 June, but her gunners shot it down in the nick of time a scant 75 yards from the ship. However, an exploding bomb killed three men and caused considerable damage to hull and superstructure.

After repairs at Kerama Retto, Halloran patrolled off Ie Shima from 5 to 13 July, then assumed tactical command of an escort screen for LST's en route to the Philippines. After arriving Leyte Gulf on 17 July, she patrolled at San Pedro Bay, Leyte, and Lopez Bay, Luzon, prior to departing the Philippines for the United States on 10 September. Halloran arrived San Diego, California, on 29 September and sailed three days later for Charleston, South Carolina, where she arrived on 11 October. She decommissioned at Charleston on 2 November 1945. Her name was struck from the Navy List on 28 November 1945, and she was sold on 7 March 1947.

== Awards ==
Halloran received three battle stars for World War II service.
