= Michael O'Halloran =

Michael O'Halloran may refer to:

== Politicians ==
- Mick O'Halloran (1893–1960), Australian Labor Party (ALP) politician
- Michael O'Halloran (British politician) (1933–1999), British Member of Parliament for Islington North, London, 1969–1983
- Michael O'Halloran (Irish politician) (1936–2023), trade unionist and Lord Mayor of Dublin 1984–1985

== Sportspeople ==
- Michael O'Halloran (Clare hurler) (born 1971), Irish hurler
- Michael O'Halloran (Cork hurler) (born 1997), Irish hurler
- Michael O'Halloran (footballer) (born 1991), Scottish footballer (Bolton Wanderers, St Johnstone, Rangers)

== Fiction ==
- Michael O'Halloran (novel), a novel by Gene Stratton-Porter
  - Michael O'Halloran (1923 film), a 1923 American silent drama film, based the novel
  - Michael O'Halloran (1937 film), a 1937 American drama film, based the novel
  - Michael O'Halloran (1948 film), a 1948 American drama film, based the novel
