= St Luke's Church, Adelaide =

Anglican church in Adelaide, South Australia

St Luke's Church
- Interactive fullscreen map
- 34.933°S 138.5931°E ,
- Location: City of Adelaide
- Address: 35 Whitmore Square, Adelaide SA 5000, Australia
- Country: Australia
- Denomination: Anglican Church of Australia
- Website: https://stlukesadelaide.org.au/

History
- Status: Active
- Consecrated: 1856; 170 years ago

Architecture
- Architect: Edmund Wright

Administration
- Diocese: Adelaide

St Luke's is an Anglican church in the south-west of the City of Adelaide.

The foundation stone for St Luke's Church was laid on 11 September 1855 by Governor Sir Richard Graves MacDonnell. It was consecrated by the bishop on 14 February 1856.

== Iron Church ==
A prefabricated iron church, designed to hold at least 450 people, was ordered from England in 1853. As the arrival of the iron church became imminent, some subscribers still desired a 'colonially-built church of stone'. It was agreed by Aug 1855 that the roof, windows, pews and flooring were suitable for either type of building, but that the other parts of the iron church were to be sold. When the iron church arrived in September 1855, it was deemed unfit to be erected due to salt water damage, so all the materials were auctioned 'for the benefit of the underwriters'. It was decided to proceed with the construction of a stone church, with the foundation stone to be laid the following day.
