= Sharyn O'Halloran =

American economist

Academic background
- Education: University of California, San Diego (B.A., M.A., Ph.D.); Columbia University (M.S. Enterprise Risk Management)

Academic work
- Discipline: Political economy

Sharyn O’Halloran is the Strategic Academic Leadership Initiative Professor of Political Economy at Trinity College Dublin and Trinity Professorial Fellow.

In 2006 she was named the George Blumenthal Professor of Political Economics and International and Public Affairs at Columbia University, where she served as the Senior Vice Dean and Chief Academic Officer at the School of Professional Studies.

A political scientist and economist by training, O’Halloran has written extensively on issues related to the political economy of international trade and finance, regulation and institutional reform, economic growth and democratic transitions, and the political representation of minorities.

== Career ==
O’Halloran began her career as a postdoctoral fellow at the Public Policy Program at Stanford University. She then joined the Columbia University faculty in the Department of Political Science and the School of International and Public Affairs. She is currently an associate director of Columbia's Applied Statistics Center. Among the grants and awards she has received are the 2005 Decade of Behavior Award, the Harvard-MIT Postdoctoral Fellowship in Political Economics, a Hoover Institution National Fellowship, a Russell Sage Foundation Fellowship, a Carnegie Corporation Scholarship, and National Science Foundation grants. In 2009 was also named one of the 'Top 100 Irish Educators'.

She is the author and co-author of books, including Politics, Process and American Trade Policy (the University of Michigan Press); Delegating Powers (Cambridge University Press); The Future of the Voting Rights Act (Russell Sage Foundation); as well as numerous journal articles on administrative procedures and agency design, with application to international trade, antitrust and financial regulatory policy, including those published in the American Journal of Political Science, the American Political Science Review, International Organization, Yale Law Journal, NYU Law Journal, the Journal of Law, and Economics and Organization.

O’Halloran has served as an advisor to the Mexican Department of Commerce, International Trade Division (SECOFI) during the NAFTA negotiations concerning the politics of “Fast Track” authority, as well as the possible responses to the U.S. court ruling that required an environmental impact statement in advance of trade agreements, and has written extensively in the areas of trade and the environment, and trade and labor, and global outsourcing. She recently advised the Turkish government on the impact of democratization and economic development on political stability; O’Halloran has also consulted with the World Bank's International Finance Group and its Regulation and Competition Policy Group on the impact of trade and political institutions on economic growth and performance, as well as a large project analyzing data on trade openness, international organizations, and their impact on democratic transitions. She was part of the expert witness team in Georgia v. Ashcroft, and other redistricting cases.

In addition, O’Halloran has served on numerous local community boards, including those affecting the rezoning and economic development of Upper Manhattan, and provided a congressional briefing on the potential impact on the renewal of the 2007 Voting Rights Act. She also plays a major administrative role as Chair of the University Senate at Columbia University. She also serves on the Board of Directors of Community Impact of Columbia University, a community service organization working in Morningside Heights and the Upper Manhattan area.

== Education ==
O’Halloran received a B.A. degree in economics and political science from University of California, San Diego. O’Halloran then received her M.A. and Ph.D. from the University of California, San Diego. O'Halloran also earned an M.S. in Enterprise Risk Management from Columbia University. Her work focuses on formal and quantitative methods and their application to politics, economics, and public policy.

== Selected publications ==
- Politics, Process and American Trade Policy ISBN 978-0472105168 (University of Michigan Press, 1994)
- Delegating Powers: A Transaction Cost Politics Approach to Policy Making Under Separate Powers ISBN 0-521-66960-X (Cambridge University Press, 1999)
- The Future of the Voting Rights Act. Co-edited. ISBN 087154072X (New York: Russell Sage Foundation, 2006.)
- After the Crash: Financial Crises and Regulatory Responses. Co-edited with Thomas Groll ISBN 0231192843 New York: Columbia University Press, 2019.
- Epstein, David; O'Halloran, Sharyn (1994). "Administrative Procedures, Information, and Agency Discretion". American Journal of Political Science. 38 (3). [Midwest Political Science Association, Wiley]: 697–722. ISSN 0092-5853. JSTOR 2111603.
- “Divided Government and U.S. Trade Policy.” (International Organization 48: 595–632, 1994)
- “Do Majority-Minority Districts Maximize Substantive Black Representation in Congress?” (American Political Science Review 90: 794–812, 1996)
- “Democratic Transitions.” (American Journal of Political Science 50 (July): 551–569, 2006)
- Klamma, Ralf; O'Halloran, Sharyn; Rokne, Jon (8 November 2021). Coscia, Michele; Cuzzocrea, Alfredo; Shu, Kai (eds.). Proceedings of the 2021 IEEE/ACM International Conference on Advances in Social Networks Analysis and Mining. New York, NY, USA: ACM. doi:10.1145/3487351. ISBN 978-1-4503-9128-3.
- Big Data and the Regulation of Banking and Financial Services. Banking & Financial Services Policy Report 34 (12): 1–10, 2015.
- Sharyn O'Halloran; Sameer Maskey; Geraldine McAllister; David K. Park; Kaiping Chen (2016). "Data Science and Political Economy: Application to Financial Regulatory Structure". RSF: The Russell Sage Foundation Journal of the Social Sciences. 2 (7): 87. doi:10.7758/rsf.2016.2.7.06.
- “Daisy Chains and Non-cleared OTC Derivatives.” Banking & Financial Services Policy Report 36 (2): 10–12, 2017.
- "An Artificial Intelligence Approach to Regulating Systemic." "Risk Frontiers in Artificial Intelligence"

== Professional associations and boards ==
- Associate Editor for Social Network Analysis and Mining (SNAM)
- Economics Club New York
- American Political Science Association
- American Economic Association
- IEEE Member
- Community Impact, Board of Directors

== Personal life ==
O'Halloran is a marathon and ultramarathon runner. She swam for the Mission Viejo Nadadores. O'Halloran played water polo in high school and UCSD.
