= Peter Halloran =

American businessman

Peter M. Halloran (born 6 April 1962) is the founder and CEO of Pharos Financial Group, an investment firm active in global markets since 1997. The firm was established with initial investment capital from Credit Suisse and Soros Fund Management. In 2014, Pharos added a Dallas-based investment arm, Titanium Exploration Partners LLC, to invest into U.S. Oil & Gas opportunities. Altogether, Halloran has brought over $10 billion to the markets in which he invests. He was awarded Hedge Fund Manager of the Year in 2010 by Hedge Fund World, and his Pharos Gas Investment Fund and Pharos Russia Fund have been both ranked among top-15 global performers by Bloomberg. He has never gated an investment, suspended an NAV or re-set a high water mark. In 2011, Halloran established the physical oil trading firm, Pharos Energy Ltd., which was then sold in 2014. In 2000, Halloran acquired a stake in Aton Capital Group and subsequently transformed it into a top emerging markets investment bank that was later sold to UniCredit Bank for $424 million.

Halloran played an important role in the development of the Russian capital markets in the 1990s through equity, debt, and private placements while also guiding Russian politicians and local exchanges to work around outdated Soviet-era laws to enable the Russian capital markets to develop. In early 1994 he acquired nearly 10% of all outstanding privatization vouchers and, in 1995, Halloran pioneered the first foreign investments into Russian treasury bills (GKO's) and restricted shares of energy giant Gazprom. In 1996 and 1997 Halloran arranged more than $2 billion of privatization bids for Russian and Ukrainian companies. In 2002, he led the first IPO of a domestic company to be listed on a Russian exchange. Prior to establishing Pharos, Halloran built and managed the CIS brokerage and proprietary trading businesses of Credit Suisse in Moscow. Earlier he was based in New York with CS First Boston, Salomon Brothers and Morgan Grenfell. He has also acted as an Advisor to Soros Fund Management.

Halloran is the grandson of Dr. Orvan W. Hess who was a noted U.S. physician and a recipient of the American Medical Association's Scientific Achievement Award for pioneering the development of the fetal heart monitor and his earlier work helping to introduce penicillin to the U.S. His mother, Dr. Katherine Hess Halloran, is a published research physician who conducted early genetic research into the chromosomal cause of Down Syndrome.

Halloran graduated from Yale University (B.A., 1984) and attended the University of Texas School of Law.

== Sources ==
- Sesit, Michael R. (August 23, 2000). "U.S., British Bankers Will Invest In Russian Securities House Aton". The Wall Street Journal.
- Westin, Peter, ed. (2001). "Part II, Chapter 4, Russian capital markets 1994-2001: a ground-level account by Peter M. Halloran". The Wild East: Negotiating the Russian Financial Frontier. Financial Times Prentice Hall. ISBN 1-903684-09-9.
- Horwood, Clive (May 2007). "UniCredito bought the Russian broker Aton Capital for $424m". Euromoney.
