= Bob Halloran =

Bob or Robert Halloran may refer to:

- Bob Halloran (CBS sportscaster) (1934–2022), American sports executive and national CBS sportscaster
- Bob Halloran (ABC sportscaster), American sports announcer for ABC Boston
- Robert Halloran (1906–1936), American swimmer

== See also ==
- Bob O'Halloran (1888–1974), Australian politician
