= Greensted Church =

Anglo-Saxon wooden church

Coordinates: 51.70436°N 0.22555°E

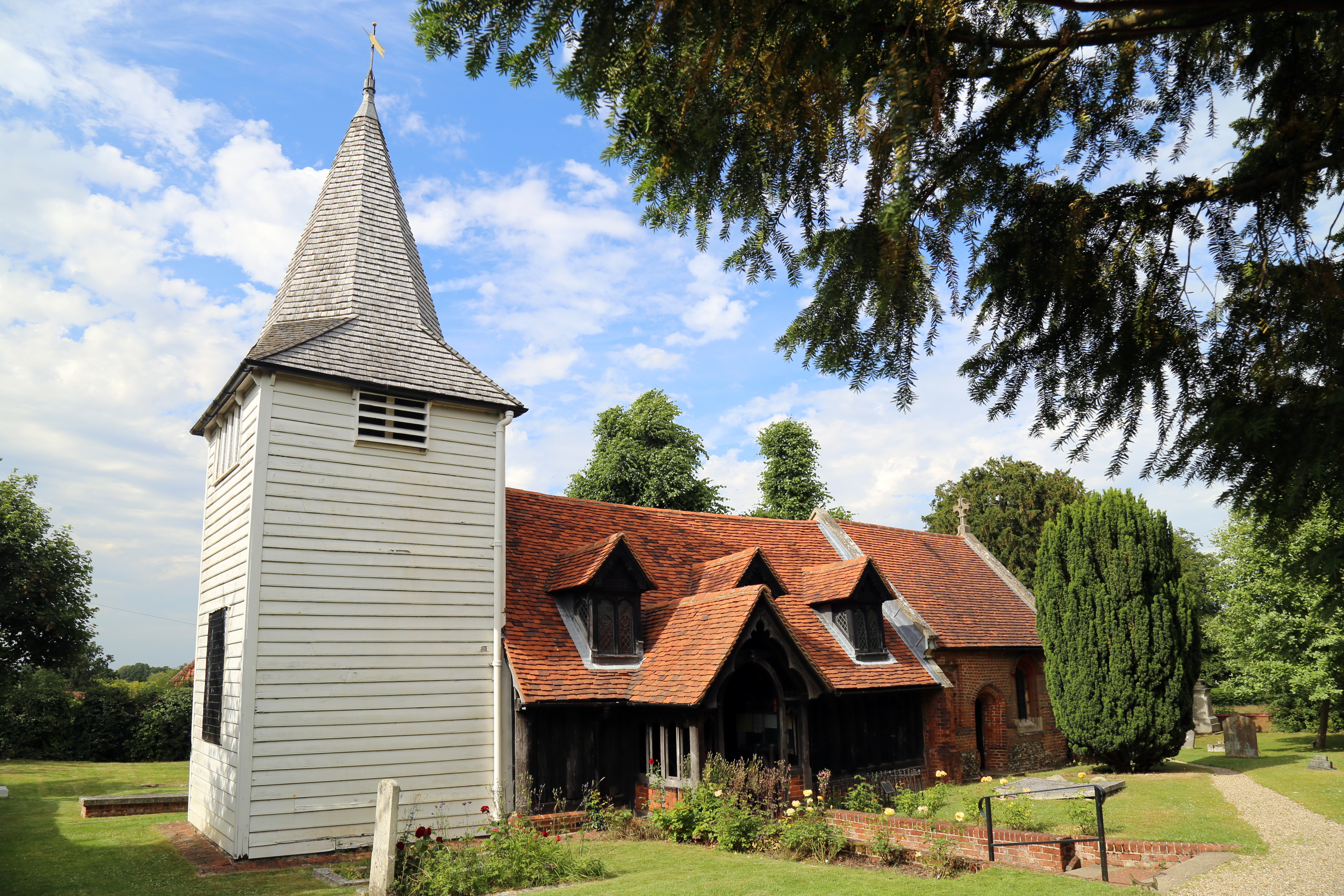
- Greensted Church in June 2015
- Interactive map of the Greensted Church area
- Alternative names: The Church of St Andrew, Greensted-juxta-Ongar

General information
- Location: Greensted, Essex, England, United Kingdom
- Year built: Mid-9th or mid-11th century
- Owner: Church of England

Greensted Church, in the small village of Greensted, near Chipping Ongar in Essex, England, has been claimed to be the oldest wooden church in the world, and probably the oldest wooden building in Europe still standing, albeit only in part, since few sections of its original wooden structure remain. The oak walls are often classified as remnants of a palisade church or, more loosely, as a kind of early stave church, dated either to the mid-9th or mid-11th century.

The Grade I listed building lies about a mile west of Chipping Ongar town centre. Its full title is The Church of St Andrew, Greensted-juxta-Ongar. It is, however, commonly known simply as Greensted Church. Greensted is still a functioning church and holds services every week.

== History ==
A stained glass window depicting St Edmund

Greensted Church has possibly stood for nearly 1,200 years. Dendrochronology estimated its construction to 845 AD; a later analysis has reset the date of the timbers to 1053 (+10/55 years). Archaeological evidence suggests that, before there was a permanent structure, there may have been another church, or a holy place, on the site. Construction of the first permanent church on this site is thought to have begun shortly after Cedd began his conversion of the East Saxons around 654. The archaeological remnants of two simple wooden buildings were discovered under the present chancel floor, and these are thought to have been built in the late 6th or early 7th century.

The church's dedication to St Andrew might suggest a Celtic foundation for the original sanctuary. The body of King Edmund the Martyr of East Anglia (who was killed in 870, possibly at Hoxne) is said to have rested there in 1013, on its way to reburial at Bury St Edmunds. There are many tributes to St Edmund in the church itself.

Some of the Tolpuddle Martyrs were granted farm tenancies in the Chipping Ongar area after they returned from transportation. One of them, James Brine, married Elizabeth, daughter of Thomas Standfield, at Greensted church on 20 June 1839; the record of the marriage can be seen in the present register. The Brines moved to London, Ontario, Canada in 1844.

The church was featured on a British postage stamp issued in 1972, part of a set of village churches. The oak font, designed by Hugh Casson and made by Russell Thomas, was added in 1987.

== Construction ==
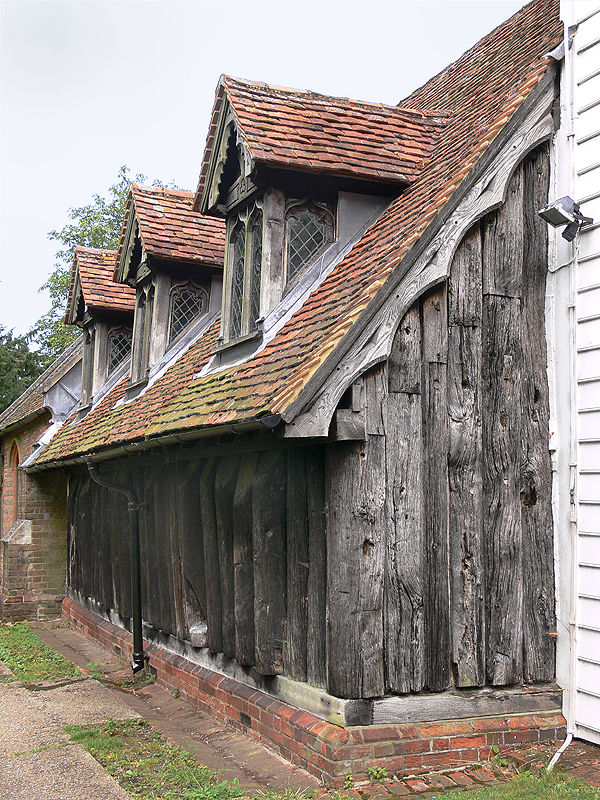
The north wall and part of the west wall of the nave; the notch, low down on the 7th trunk along from the corner, may either be a "leper's squint", or an Anglo-Saxon window.

The church, like many, has had work performed on it over the centuries.

=== Anglo-Saxon and Norman elements ===
The nave is made of large split oak tree trunks, which was a traditional Anglo-Saxon way of building. The nave is mostly original, and dendrochronological research in the 1960s dated it to 845. In 1995, however, this date was revised to 1053 +10–55 years (some time between 1063 and 1108). This range of dates is based on the dendrochronological date of the youngest timber (1053), plus a standard allowance of 10–55 years for sapwood rings which are assumed to have been weathered away.

An interesting detail of the nave is the so-called "leper's squint" or hagioscope on the north side. This small aperture through the oak wall was formerly thought to have been a place where lepers who, not allowed inside the church with the general populace, were allowed to receive a blessing from the priest. Its position next to the original doorway has led researchers to conclude that it was a window used to see who was approaching the church.

In the chancel, the flint footings of the wall and the pillar piscina inside the sanctuary are all that is left of any Norman work. Near the porch, a large, coped stone marks the resting place of an unknown knight.

=== 16th century ===
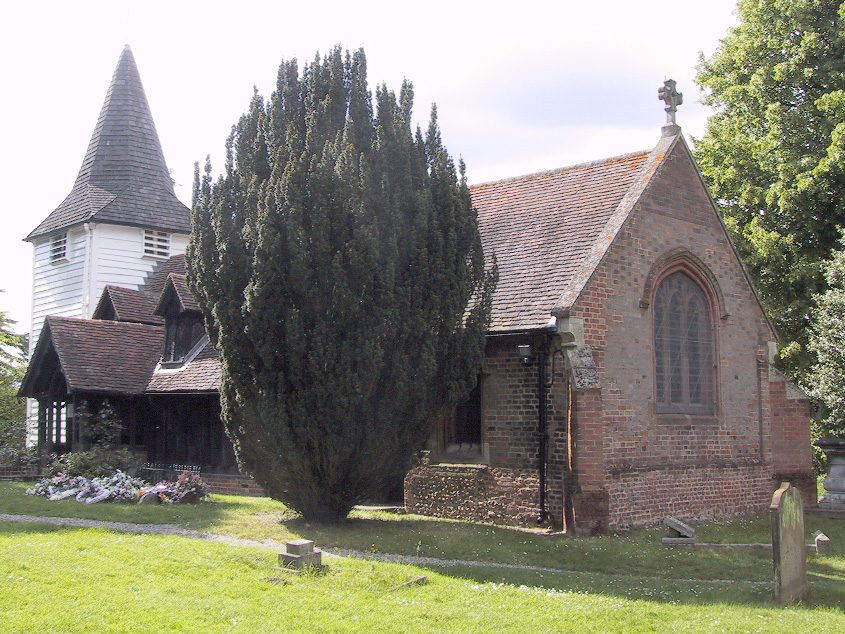
View of Greensted Church from the southeast corner. From here the different eras of construction and restoration are visible, the brickwork being newer.

The original chancel was small and built of timber, but the current brick-built chancel dates from this period of construction.

=== 17th to 19th centuries ===
The white weatherboarded tower was added in the Stuart period (17th century), and is what initially draws the eye. One of the bells is inscribed "William Land made me 1618". There are a number of mediaeval wooden towers in the district.

Around this time the three dormer windows were added to the nave for the first time, and the south porch was added. A fragment of 15th-century glass can be seen in the centre of the quatrefoil window at the west end, but it was set there during the Victorian restoration. The earliest wall memorial is dedicated to Jone Wood, 1585.

Reconstruction work by the Victorians in the 19th century added some detailed brickwork to the building along with, most probably, some of the more ornate decoration to the outside. It replaced the three dormer windows with six, and the porch was reconstructed, along with other minor alterations and stone coping.

== Sources ==
- Bettley, James; Pevsner, Nikolaus (2007). Essex. The Buildings of England. New Haven, US and London: Yale University Press. ISBN 978-0-300-11614-4. OCLC 1042848015.
