= James Halloran =

Professor James Halloran (died 16 May 2007) was a British communication scholar known for his contribution for the establishment of the field of media studies in the United Kingdom. He was the head of Leicester University's Centre for Mass Communication Research for over twenty years, and also a founder of the International Association for Media and Communication Research, (Formally known as The International Association of Mass Communication Research).
