= Julia Farr Centre =

Former hospital and disability institution in Adelaide, Australia

Highgate Park (known as Julia Farr Centre)
- Disability SA

Geography
- Location: Fullarton, South Australia, Australia
- Coordinates: 34°57′28″S 138°37′07″E

Organisation
- Religious affiliation: Non-denominational

History
- Former names: Home for Incurables; Julia Farr Centre; Julia Farr Services
- Opened: 1879
- Closed: Hospital, admin buildings and the chapel closed in April 2020. Gosse International Student Residence remains open and operating. The large green space also remains open for all to enjoy.

Links
- Lists: Hospitals in Australia

Founded in 1879 as the Home for Incurables, Highgate Park, which is more commonly known by its previous name - the Julia Farr Centre - is a 2.8 hectare site in Fullarton, South Australia comprising:

- A set of buildings, including a 9-storey hospital care facility for the disabled and a chapel, that opened in 1977 and closed in 2020;
- Gosse International Student Residence that opened in 1949;
- A large green space that includes 29 significant and regulated trees, and
- Several small car parks.

Today, the only people who live and work on the Highgate Park site are the 67 tenants, workers and management of Gosse International Student Residence. The large Highgate Park green space is used by community members and visitors alike for a variety of recreational purposes.

On 26 September, 2023, in recognition of its unique and important heritage values, and the seminal contributions made by its founders Julia Farr and Dr William Gosse in caring for the disabled community of South Australia, an application was made to the South Australian Heritage Council nominating Highgate Park for listing and protection as a South Australian Heritage site.

Given the national heritage values and significance of Highgate Park, a National Heritage Nomination application will also be made to the Australian Government for listing and protection of Highgate Park when National Heritage Nominations for the 2024-25 year open in early 2024.

== 1879: Home for Incurables ==
The Home for Incurables was proposed as a non-denominational charitable institution by Julia Farr née Ord (1824–1914), wife of George Henry Farr (1819–1904), Anglican priest and headmaster of St. Peter's College. She was concerned at the plight of impoverished patients of the Adelaide Hospital who were discharged as "incurable" due to the nature of their illness or disability, then had no-one to support them and nowhere to go but the Adelaide Destitute Asylum.

Farr, who had previously founded the Orphan Home for Girls, had the support of Dr. William Gosse, who volunteered his services as chairman of a committee to raise funds for the project. An eight-roomed house on a large block of land on Fisher Street Fullarton was purchased for £1,700 and a further £300 expended on refurbishment of the home. In October 1879 ten inmates of the Destitute Asylum, young and old, male and female, were transferred to the Home. It was a condition of entry that the patient was not insane, and that the incurable disease was not contagious, although that stipulation was later occasionally waived for those suffering from tuberculosis.

It soon became apparent that the existing facility was too small, and another building with accommodation for 30 was erected on the property and opened in February 1881. An extension capable of housing another 40 patients was added to this building in 1884 and named the Gosse Memorial Wing.

Over the ensuing hundred years adjacent land was purchased as it became available, and the old buildings demolished to make way for more modern accommodation. The West Block (Fisher Building), built between 1964 and 1967, was made obsolete by the new East Block, and largely vacated in 1978 (their centenary). The number of resident patients rose from 142 in 1928 to 400 in the 1960s to 826 by the end of 1978, the largest institution of its kind in the southern hemisphere.

== 1981: Julia Farr Centre/Services ==
In 1981 the Home for Incurables was renamed the Julia Farr Centre. During the early 1980s, the West Wing was vacated owing to asbestos being present in the building.

In 1994 the centre was renamed Julia Farr Services, continuing to provide residential care and assistance for people living with a disability, and also providing aged care services. The property on which the Fisher Building stood was sold by Disability SA to a developer in 2003. In 2006 Julia Farr Services became a part of Disability SA, and after parts of the site were sold, what remained of it was renamed Highgate Park. The former West Wing remained derelict for many years.

== 2006: Highgate Park ==
As Highgate Park, the facility continued to provide residential care for people with disabilities from the age of 15, and included an aged care unit managed by the ACH Group, until its closure in 2020. However, from 2014 it stopped accepting new residents, with the last resident moving out in 2020.

== 2020: Closure ==
The facility was closed in April 2020, and in July the state government invited suggestions from the public via an online "YourSay" questionnaire whether the property should be sold or repurposed into a new facility. Proceeds from sale of the building has to go towards something which is stipulated by South Australians with disability, as per the terms of the trust.

In April 2021 Highgate Park was put up for sale on the open market, with the proviso that any proceeds would be "used to benefit South Australians living with disability". Minister for Human Services, Nat Cook, is the sole trustee of the trust that owns Highgate Park, the Home for the Incurables Trust. The government agency Renewal SA has been appointed to manage the sale.

The site was sold in early 2024. It was revealed that the buildings will be refurbished. The buildings will be a retirement home.

== Repurposing Old Buildings ==
Various development proposals for the Fisher Building fell through after its sale in 2003 and the building, which had meanwhile become the target for vandals and graffiti artists, was sold to Living Choice and demolished in 2011 to make way for a five-storey retirement complex.

The Gosse Building, on the corner of Fisher and Highgate Streets, has been operated as a student residence since 1997, known as Gosse International Student Residence. The seven-acre site, which includes a 9-storey hospital building (Highgate Tower), a chapel, an administration building, and four acres of green space and car parks, was advertised for sale in early 2021 by Renewal SA, but as of December 2021 the managers and residents of Gosse International Student Residence are fighting to save the building by offering to purchase it separately from the rest of the Highgate Park site.

In July 2021, the Highgate Tower hospital building was temporarily reopened by the SA government as a COVID-19 vaccine centre.

== Gosse International Student Residence Controversy ==
After the closures of the 9-storey Highgate Park Tower hospital building, the Round House administration building and the chapel in 2020, the only building that remains open and operating on the 7-acre Highgate Park site is Gosse International Student Residence. The Gosse building opened in 1949 as hospital staff accommodation but was repurposed in 1997 as university student accommodation. The Gosse building now provides affordable rental accommodation ($175/week) for 63 residents, most of whom are international university students.

The Highgate Park site, including the Gosse building, is owned by the private Home for Incurables Trust. The sole trustee and registered proprietor of the Highgate Park site is South Australian Minister for Human Services, Nat Cook. After the closure of the Highgate Park hospital in April, 2020, the South Australian government conducted a YourSAy (sic) public consultation survey in July, 2020, for ideas about the future use of the Highgate Park site. The residents, workers and management of the Gosse building were unaware and were not informed of the YourSAy survey.

After the YourSAy survey was completed the South Australian government commissioned the consultancy Think Human to conduct stakeholder engagement surveys of members of the disabled and local communities and others for ideas on future use of the Highgate Park site. Despite being the only people living and working on the Highgate Park site at the time, the South Australian government chose to exclude all Gosse residents, staff and management from the local community engagement process for ideas on future use of the Highgate Park site. In its 38-page Highgate Park stakeholder consultation report, commissioned by the South Australian government, Think Human forgot to mention there are 67 humans living and working at Gosse International Student Residence on the Highgate Park site.

Gosse residents, facing the prospect of homelessness if the Gosse building is demolished and its land site sold and redeveloped as part of the sale and redevelopment of the Highgate Park site, launched a campaign in December, 2021 to save Gosse International Student Residence. Gosse residents support the commercial proposal of the Gosse Business manager to purchase the Gosse Building and the land upon which it rests as a parcel of land separate to the sale of the remainder of the Highgate Park site to preserve Gosse as affordable student accommodation.

== Officers ==
The following people served on the Julia Farr Centre committee:

Chairman, committee of management

- Dr William Gosse 1878 to 1881
- Dr Robert Tracey Wylde (1820–1903) 1881 to 1895
- Henry Scott 1895 to 1907
- G. F. Claridge 1907 to 1931
- H. Koeppen-Wendt 1931 to ?
- Dr. F. Humphrey Makln
- Archdeacon Clampett (1860–1953) 1940

Hon. Secretary

- A. MacGeorge, perhaps Alexander Macgeorge JP (c. 1826–1908)
- G. J. Shirreff Bowyear 1880 to 1888
- J. H. Cunningham 1888 to 1909
- A. E. H. Evans 1909 to 1948
- R. G. Rees 1948 to
