= Edwin Gordon Blackmore =

Australian parliamentary clerk

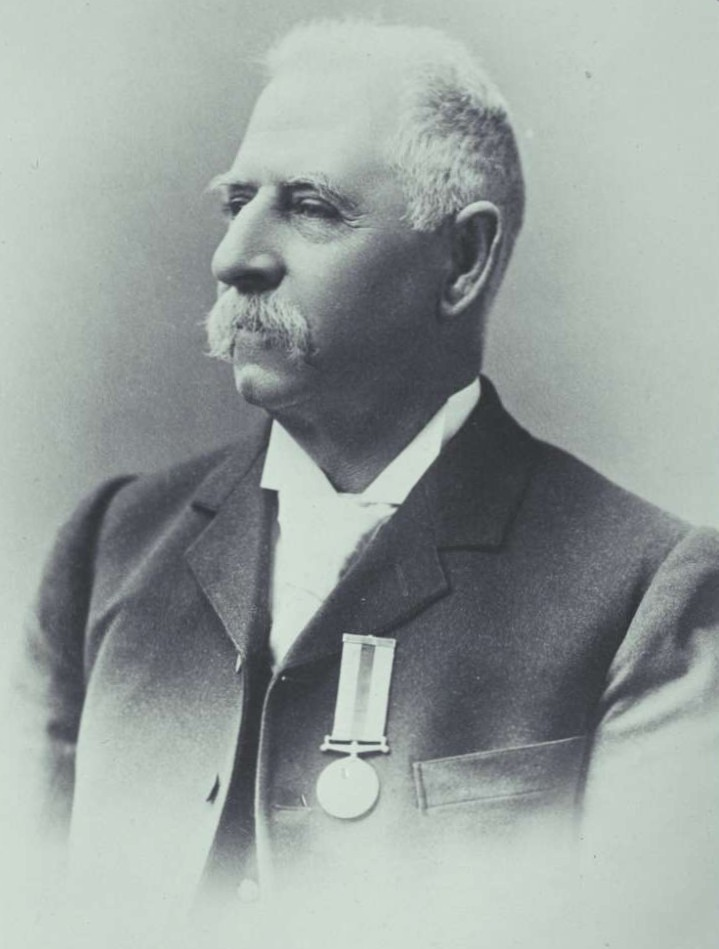
Edwin Gordon Blackmore at the 1898 Australasian Federal Convention.

Edwin Gordon Blackmore CMG (1837–1909), was Clerk of the Legislative Council and Clerk of Parliaments of the colony of South Australia.

Blackmore was educated at King Edward VI. Grammar School, Bath, Somerset. He served with the Taranaki Rifle Volunteers in the New Zealand war from 1863 to 1864, and was present, in reserve, at the action of Poatoko, on 2 October 1863, and at the storming and capture of the rebel Maori strongholds at Ahuahu and Kaitake in March 1864. For these services Blackmore received the New Zealand medal. He was appointed Parliamentary Librarian to the Legislature of South Australia in Oct. 1864; Clerk Assistant and Sergeant-at-arms, House of Assembly, in Dec. 1869; Clerk of the House of Assembly in May 1886; Clerk of the Legislative Council and Clerk of Parliaments in May 1887.

He also acted as Clerk of the 1897-1898 Australian Federal Convention, and was appointed a Companion of the Order of St Michael and St George in the New Year Honours List 1901, in recognition of services in connection with the Federation of Australian Colonies and the establishment of the Commonwealth of Australia He was Clerk of the Australian Senate and Clerk of the Parliaments from 1901 until 1908.

He was a prominent member of the Adelaide Hunt Club and Master of Fox Hounds for the years 1870 and 1885.

He was the father of the early Australian rules football player, Lewis Blackmore.

== Works ==
- The Decisions of Mr. Speaker Denison on Points of Order, Rules of Debate, and the General Practice of the House of Commons from 1857 to 1872
- The Decisions of Mr. Speaker Brand from 1872 to 1884
- The Decisions of Mr. Speaker Peel from 1884 to 1886, and 1887 to 1889
- Manual of the Practice, Procedure, and Usage of the House of Assembly of South Australia
