= North Road Cemetery =

Cemetery in Nailsworth, South Australia

Coordinates: 34°53′S 138°36′E

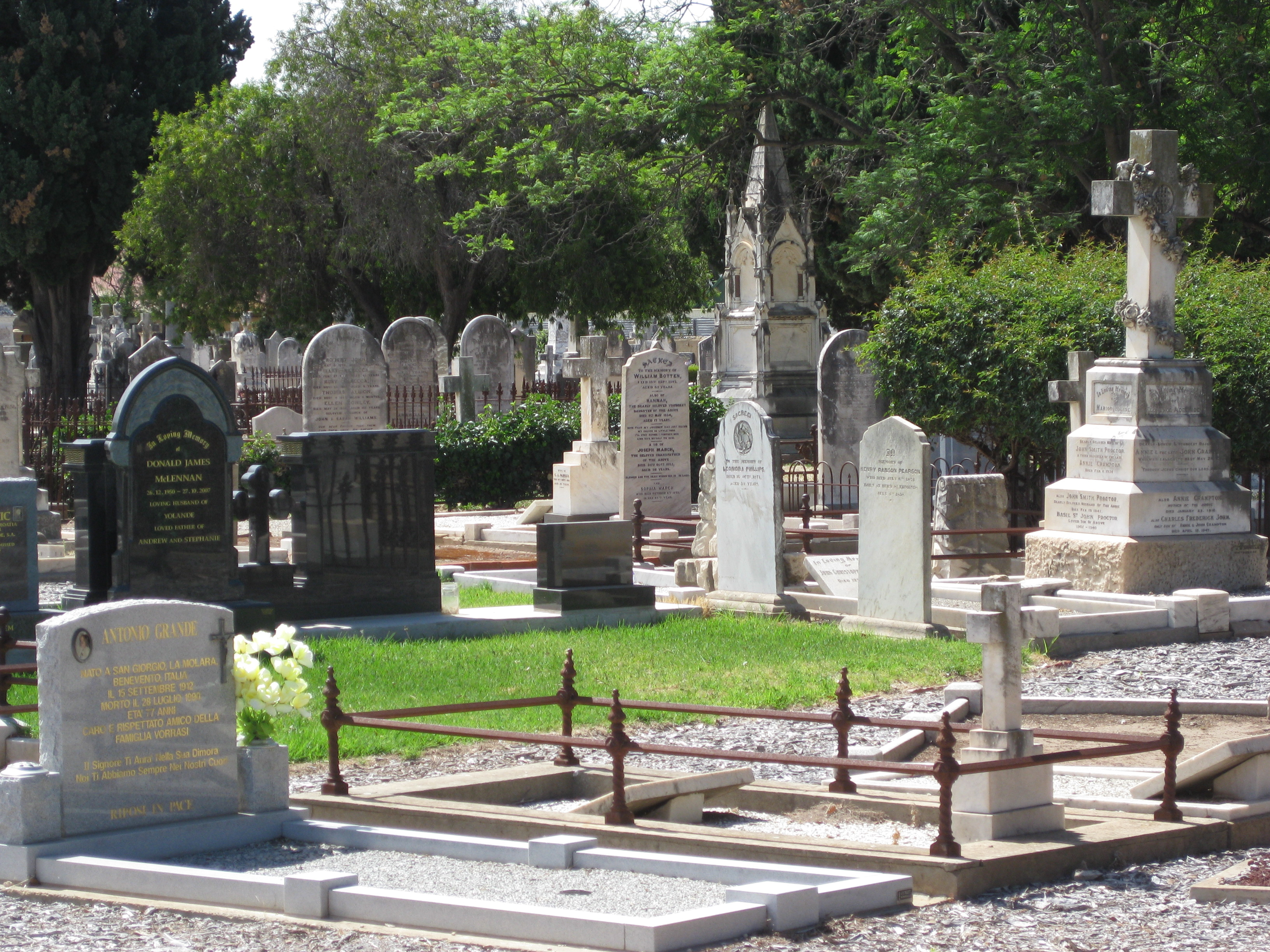
- Graves at North Road Cemetery
- Interactive map of North Road Cemetery

Details
- Established: 1853
- Location: Nailsworth, South Australia
- Country: Australia
- Owned by: Anglican Diocese of Adelaide
- Size: 18 acres (73,000 m^{2})
- No. of graves: more than 10,000
- Website: http://www.anglicancemeteries.com
- Find a Grave: North Road Cemetery

North Road Cemetery is located in the Adelaide suburb of Nailsworth, approximately 5 km north of the central business district. It is 7.3 hectares (18 acres) in size and there have been over 27,000 burials since its foundation in 1853. The original size of the cemetery was 0.8 hectare (2 acres) and was established by South Australia's first Anglican bishop, Augustus Short on land which he owned. The cemetery is still maintained by the Anglican Diocese of Adelaide.

== Notable interments ==
- Francis Williams (headmaster) was headmaster of St Peter's College, Adelaide, South Australia.
- Richard Baker, barrister and politician, first president of the Australian Senate
- Daisy Bates, journalist, welfare worker and Protector of Aborigines
- Benjamin Boothby, colonial judge
- Haydn Bunton, Sr., legendary Australian rules footballer
- Henry John Butler, early Australian aviator
- Sir Robert William Chapman, engineer and mathematician
- John Dempster, City Organist
- John Downer, twice Premier of South Australia in the 19th century
- Rev. George Henry Farr, headmaster of St Peter's College, and his wife Julia Farr, social worker
- William Finke, early settler, prospector and pastoralist
- James Collins Hawker, explorer, surveyor and aide de camp to Governor George Gawler
- George Wright Hawkes, Anglican churchman associated with Trinity Church and St Peter's College
- Clem Hill, Australian cricketer
- Stephen King, Australian explorer
- Sir Angas Parsons, politician and judge
- William John Peterswald, Chief Commissioner of Police of the Colony of South Australia (1882-1896)
- Alexander Poynton, former treasurer and Federal Parliament politician
- Charles Rasp, discoverer of lead deposits at Broken Hill and a founding shareholder of BHP
- Moritz Richard Schomburgk, German-born botanist and director of the Adelaide Botanic Garden
- Alfred Searcy, public servant and writer
- Sir Keith Macpherson Smith, early Australian aviator and flight pioneer
- Sir Ross Macpherson Smith, early Australian aviator and flight pioneer
- Edward Charles Stirling, founder of the University of Adelaide's medical school, director of South Australian Museum, anthropologist, explorer and the first person in Australasia to introduce a bill for women's suffrage
- Harriet Stirling OBE, joint founder of the School for Mothers and Mareeba Babies' Hospital
- John Lancelot Stirling, member of parliament, director of several important SA companies, and introducer of polo to South Australia
- Sir Robert Kyffin Thomas, newspaper proprietor
- Charles Todd, colonial superintendent of telegraphs and the government astronomer
- Thomas Worsnop, city treasurer and town clerk of the City of Adelaide, historian, fellow of the Royal Historical Society, London.
- Edmund Wright, architect and former lord mayor of Adelaide
- John Wrathall Bull, claimed inventor of the Wheat Stripper

The cemetery contains the war graves of over 1,500 Commonwealth service personnel, ranging from WW1 to the Vietnam War.
