= T. J. S. O'Halloran =

Magistrate in South Australia (1835–1922)

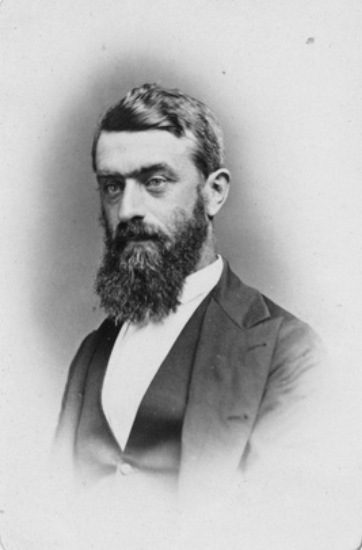
Thomas Joseph Shuldham O'Halloran around 1880.

Thomas Joseph Shuldham O'Halloran (27 April 1835 – 9 January 1922) was a magistrate in the colony and state of South Australia, a service of 45 years. At the time of his death he was the oldest stipendiary magistrate in Australia. He was a son of Major T. S. O'Halloran and father of T. S. O'Halloran KC.

== History ==
O'Halloran was born on 27 April 1835, at Dawlish, Devonshire, the eldest son of Major T. S. O'Halloran, after whom O'Halloran Hill was named. He came with his parents, brother, and sister to the Province of South Australia in the Rajasthan, landing at Glenelg in November 1838.

His education began at a private school at Magill, then St Peter's College (of which his father was a founder) as one of its earliest students.

He found employment first at the Treasury Office on 13 April 1853, then joined the National Bank, in 1871 becoming manager of the Strathalbyn branch.

On 1 November 1874 he was appointed stipendiary magistrate; he succeeded B. T. Laurie at Mount Gambier, G. W. Hawkes at Gawler, John Varley at Kapunda, McCulloch at Port Pirie. In 1878 he was appointed to Mount Gambier, and shortly after that to Mount Barker. In 1885 he was transferred to Port Elliot.

In 1887 he was transferred to Wallaroo, whose jurisdiction extended to Southern Yorke's Peninsula, Port Lincoln and Fowler's Bay in the west to Renmark (where he settled a strike by arbitration) and Morgan. He once calculated that, during his last 10 years at Wallaroo, he travelled about 14,000 miles (23,000 km) a year, and knew the state better than almost anyone.

He retired on 30 June 1905. but was appointed in October 1911 to the Port Adelaide and country region as a temporary replacement for T. Gepp.

During the 1914–1918 war he was an active member of the Cheer-Up Society (as was Herbert Whitney Waterhouse, whose daughter Margaret Eleanor Waterhouse married O'Halloran's grandson D. Bruce Ross), and every Sunday during the war he would visit the Cheer-up Hut and preside over the carving of the roast.

At a gathering at the Cheer-up Hut the late Mr. O'Halloran who, although at the time he had passed his eighty-third year, spent hours in carving for the soldiers, and then waited upon them at the tables. I may mention here that, apart from the board of management, there were at any time but few male workers at the Hut. Mr. O'Halloran, however, was a consistent worker for more than two years. He was loved by all and sundry for his manly qualities, his inexhaustible love for the soldiers, and his remarkable energy for one so advanced in years. Among other things he undertook the laborious task of keeping a check of the cutlery. He counted every knife, fork and spoon at regular intervals, and, as Mrs A. Seager often remarked 'was a wonderful and grand old man'.

He died at Rua Rua Hospital, North Adelaide, and his remains were buried at the North Road Cemetery.

== Other interests ==
While on the bench in Mount Barker he served as a vice-president of the town's football club. (It is likely, but not certain, that he was the T. S. O'Halloran who captained the Old Adelaide Football Club in its earliest days. He has on occasion been referred to as T. S. rather than T. J. S.)

Like his father and son, he cut a striking figure — 6 feet (180 cm) tall and straight as a Life Guardsman, a strong face, abundant white beard and white hair. He believed in physical exercise and was an inveterate walker. He credited his long life to exercise, fresh air, and good plain food. He was at various times a keen collector of stamps, matchboxes, then all sorts of natural curiosities — shells, snakes, lizards, seaweeds, and beetles, some of which found a home in the museums of Adelaide and Melbourne.

== Recognition ==
The T. J. S. O'Halloran Scholarship for St Peter's College students, was provided for in his son T. S. O'Halloran's will.

== Family ==
O'Halloran married Harriett Julia Woodforde (c. 1842 – 24 November 1912) on 23 April 1862. Their family included:

- Annie Isabella O'Halloran (27 April 1863 – c. 7 February 1937) married William Alexander Ross (died 28 October 1894) on 8 May 1888.
  - Their only child, Dudley Bruce Ross (1892–1984) was a lawyer, KC in 1945, Supreme Court judge in 1952 and was knighted in 1962.
- Thomas Shuldham O'Halloran (23 February 1865 – 7 June 1945), senior partner of O'Halloran & Ross and noted football administrator
- John Woodforde O'Halloran (1867– ) married Kathleen Stuart on 10 August 1904
- Frances Caroline O'Halloran (30 December 1868 – ) married Rev. William Somerville Milne on 5 June 1900.
- Rev. (Frederick) George O'Halloran (1872 – 6 June 1959) married Kate Barton-Parkes in 1901. He was Anglican chaplain to the Fremantle prison, vicar of Gingin, Western Australia then military chaplain 1916–1918
- Florence Julia O'Halloran (1874 – ) married Dr. Herbert Algar Sweetapple in 1898 and left him in 1902. When he died in 1921 his will left everything to their son and daughter, with no provision for their mother, who had been supported by him while alive, was compelled to take fruit-picking and other menial employment.
  - Margaret or Marjorie Kate Constance Sweetapple (1900– )
  - Algar Gerald Sweetapple (1902– )
- Arthur Waring O'Halloran (1876 – 11 June 1884)
- Henry Moyle O'Halloran (13 July 1884 – 20 February 1887)

They had a home at 177 Childers Street, North Adelaide
