= William O'Halloran (trade unionist) =

Irish trade unionist b. 1870s

William O'Halloran (c.1870 – after 1915) was a pioneer of trade unionism in Galway in the west of Ireland, and was also Galway city's first Labour councillor.

Born in the Bushy Park area around 1870, O'Halloran lived alone in Little/Leetle St (now called Newcastle Road from Cooke's Corner to the Presentation Road turn) at the time of the 1911 census. By his own account, he was one of a number of dock labourers who met one evening in August 1911 at Cromwell's Fort, near Renmore, to discuss the establishment of a union to represent general workers. Over the following days, news of the al fresco discussion spread around Galway, and a considerable crowd attended a subsequent public meeting at the Racquet Court Theatre. At that meeting, the Galway Workers' and General Labourers' Union (GWGLU) was established and O'Halloran was elected as its first secretary.

About a thousand members were recruited -all eager to improve their working conditions. There was opposition, however from a Galway Employers' Federation chaired by the city's leading employer Máirtín Mór McDonagh. Negotiations between the GWGLU and the Federation broke down, and 23 employers locked out their 500 workers in March 1912. Arbitration brought a settlement acceptable to the locked-out workers in less than a week, and a 'victory' was celebrated in a 2 am march through the streets of the city.

Subsequently, the GWGLU affiliated with the Liverpool-based National Union of Dock Labourers (NUDL), a move which was unusual in Irish trade unionism at a time when the Irish Transport and General Workers Union was displacing the NUDL in Ireland. O'Halloran remained as branch secretary, and he would lead his members into a general strike in late March 1913 which shut down the city for five weeks. A negotiated settlement ensued. An interview with William O'Halloran, published on the eve of the strike, provides insights into the points at issue.

In January 1914, William O'Halloran was elected a member of the Galway Urban Council, having been nominated by the Galway Trades & Labour Council. A Labour colleague, Martin Holleran, also took a seat. Having energetically raised labour matters and actively opposed recruitment into the British army early in World War One, O'Halloran sank into obscurity after 1915.
