= Thomas Shuldham O'Halloran =

British Army officer and Australian police commissioner

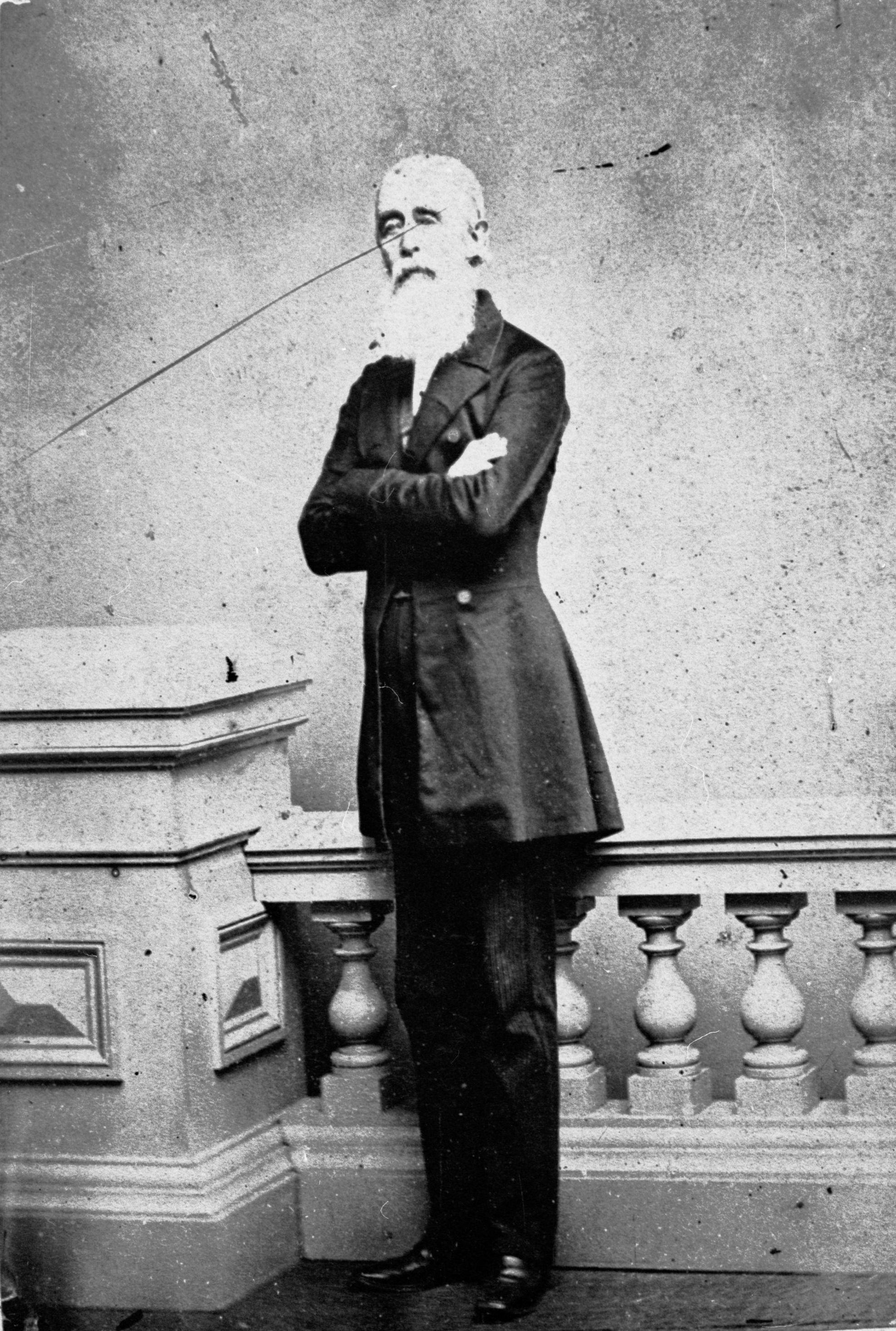
Major O'Halloran, c. 1905

Thomas Shuldham O'Halloran (25 October 1797 – 16 August 1870) was the first Police Commissioner and first Police Magistrate of South Australia.

== Early life and education ==
O'Halloran was born in Berhampore on 25 October 1797 (now Baharampur) India, the second of eight sons of Major-General Sir Joseph O'Halloran, by his wife, Frances, daughter of Colonel Nicholas Bayly, M.P., and niece of Henry, 1st Earl of Uxbridge. Thomas was a grandson of Irish surgeon Sylvester O'Halloran, and brother to William Littlejohn O'Halloran.

O'Halloran entered the Royal Military College, Sandhurst (or Marlow) in 1808 and at 16 he was commissioned into the 17th Foot and sailed for India. He served in the Nepal war during the years 1814, 1815, and 1816, became lieutenant in June 1817, and served in the Deccan war during that and the following year. On 1 August 1821 he married Miss Anne Goss of Dawlish, Devonshire, who died in 1823 in Calcutta, leaving two children.

In 1822 he exchanged from the 17th to the 44th Regiment, which he joined in Calcutta in January 1823. In 1824 he was ordered with the left wing of the 44th to Chittagong, where he arrived early in June, and was appointed paymaster, quartermaster, and interpreter. On 30 October he was appointed brigade-major to Brigadier-General Dunkin, C.B., who commanded the Sylket division of the army during the Burmese war, and served on his staff until his death in Nov. 1825. He received a medal for war service in India, for Nepal and Ava.

O'Halloran transferred to the 99th Foot as a captain in 1827. He returned to England after twenty years in India in 1834. On 10 July 1834 he married Miss Jane Waring, of Newry, County Down, and retired on half-pay in October of that year. Soon afterwards he transferred to the Coldstream Guards and was on half pay until he transferred again to the 97th Foot in May 1837.

== South Australia ==
In 1838 O'Halloran retired from the army by the sale of his commission, and sailed for South Australia the same year with his wife Jane O'Halloran, their sons Thomas Joseph Shuldham O'Halloran and George Waring Wright O'Halloran and his daughter Annie Helen Lucy O'Halloran (by his first wife), in the Rajasthan, landing at Glenelg in November 1838. He established a farm, Lizard Lodge in the Adelaide suburb which now bears his name, O'Halloran Hill. He was made a J.P. in 1839. He was gazetted Major- Commandant of the South Australian Militia on 26 February 1840, and on 8 June as Commissioner of Police.

In December 1839 he was appointed by George Gawler as one of four members of a Board of Police Commissioners. Upon the dismissal of the founder and first commander of the police, Superintendent Henry Inman in May 1840, the Board was abolished and O'Halloran was appointed under a new title of Police Commissioner. He retired from Government service in 1843 as a result of his disinclination to serve as both Police Commissioner and Police Magistrate. Upon his retirement he was appointed as a member of the South Australian Legislative Council, retaining the position until February 1851. In March 1857 he was elected as a member of the Legislative Council and served until his resignation in June 1863.

=== Maria controversy ===
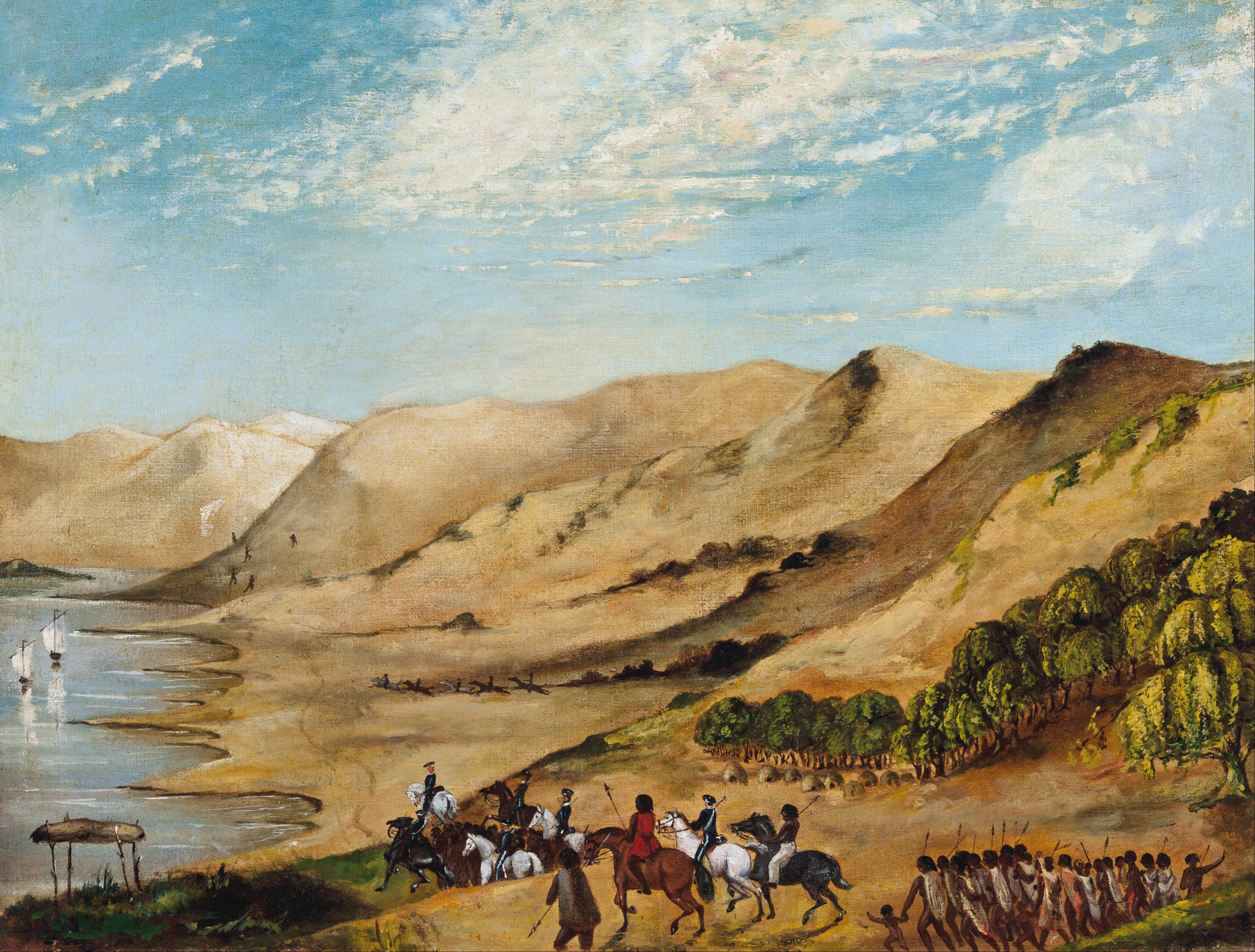
Major O'Halloran's expedition to the Coorong, August 1840. Painting by unknown artist, held at the Art Gallery of South Australia.

In June 1840, the brig Maria set sail from Port Adelaide towards Hobart. By July 1840, stories and rumours had circulated that all 26 people on board had survived a shipwreck, but had been killed by members of the Milmenrura, a clan of the Tanganekald people, along the Coorong. After a police investigation, which discovered several mutilated bodies and determined who the murderers were believed to be, Governor Gawler ordered O'Halloran (as police commissioner) and Police Inspector Alexander Tolmer to lead a party of police and sailors to the area. His orders were to find and execute those responsible.

On 22 August 1840, after several days of interviews, investigations and a drumhead court-martial, two Milmenrura men were publicly hanged on the Coorong in front of 65 people from their tribe. O'Halloran then told the people (through an interpreter) that their bodies were not to be taken down and that this was to be a warning against violence towards Europeans by Aboriginal people.

This was one of the most contentious incidents in South Australian legal history. At the time, Aboriginals in South Australia were considered British subjects, and therefore deemed to be under the protection of British law. Gawler's ordering of a drumhead court-martial and the executions was not well received by the London authorities and contributed to his removal as governor.

At that same time O'Halloran's younger brother, Captain (later Major General) Henry Dunn O'Halloran (1800–71), 69th Regt., posted at New Brunswick, Canada, was conducting a significant study of the language and customs of the indigenous Mi'kmaq people.

== Character ==
Although O'Halloran attracted a reputation for belligerence, one of his mounted troopers of the 1840s related that, "Old Major O'Halloran used to say 'I never hated a man longer than a day'".

== Death ==
O'Halloran died on 16 August 1870 at his home "Lizard Lodge", and was buried at Christ Church, O'Halloran Hill, an Anglican church which he helped to establish and is also located in the suburb, now overlooking the former Glenthorne CSIRO Research station.

== Descendants ==
O'Halloran married Anne Goss (died 1823) on 1 August 1821; they had two daughters, including:

- Anne Helen Lucy O'Halloran (19 May 1822 – 26 March 1898) married Francis Algernon Disney Roebuck
  - Alice Mary Disney-Roebuck (died 5 May 1869) married Cmdr John Brabazon Vivian RN (1836 – 21 February 1874) of HMS Achilles
  - Francis Henry Algernon Disney-Roebuck (7 October 1846 – 9 January 1919), English cricketer and army officer.

He married again, on 10 July 1834, to Jane Waring; they had three sons and one daughter, among them:

- Eldest son Thomas Joseph Shuldham O'Halloran SM (27 April 1835 – 9 January 1922), married Harriet Julia Woodforde, daughter of the Adelaide Coroner.
  - Their son Thomas Shuldham O'Halloran KC (23 February 1865 – 7 June 1945) was a lawyer and football administrator in South Australia.
- Eliza O'Halloran married farmer and flour miller Samuel White in 1853.
