= Greensted =

Village in Essex, England

Coordinates: 51.703°N 0.227°E

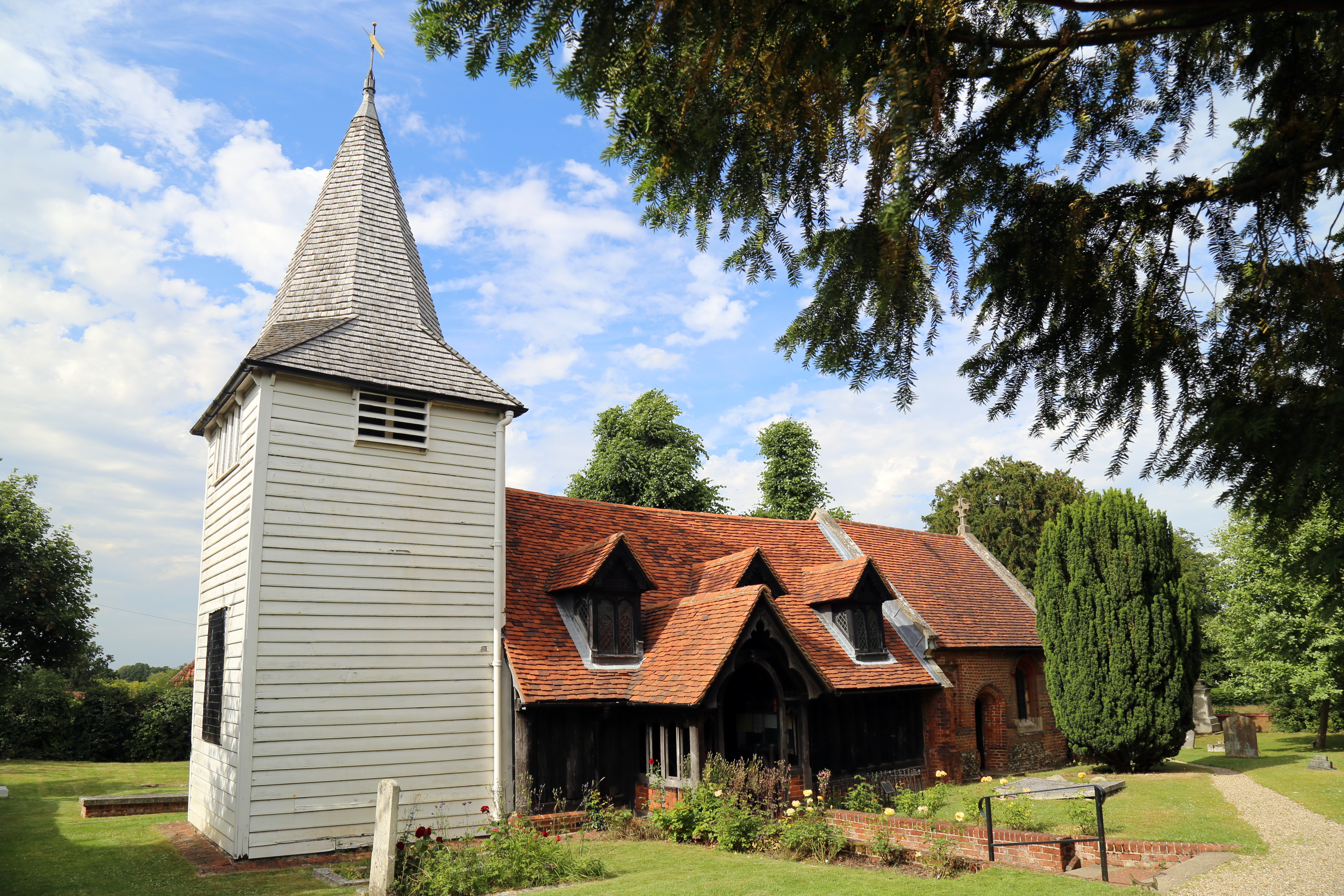
- Greensted Church, said to be the oldest wooden church in the world

- Location within Essex
- Civil parish: Ongar
- District: Epping Forest
- Shire county: Essex
- Region: East
- Country: England
- Sovereign state: United Kingdom
- Post town: Ongar
- Postcode district: CM5
- Dialling code: 01277
- Police: Essex
- Fire: Essex
- Ambulance: East of England
- UK Parliament: Brentwood and Ongar

Greensted is a small village in the civil parish of Ongar, in the Epping Forest District of Essex, England. It was formerly a separate civil parish, but was merged into Ongar in 1965. It remains an ecclesiastical parish under the name Greensted-juxta-Ongar. The small settlement of Greensted itself is on Greensted Road, approximately 1 mile (1.6 km) to the west of Chipping Ongar; a little further west is Greensted Green. Greensted Church is reputedly one of the oldest surviving wooden churches in the world, dating back to Saxon times.

== Toponymy ==
The name Greensted is Old English and means "green place". The spellings Greenstead and Greensted were historically used interchangeably; in the 19th century, government accounts used Greenstead, but the Ordnance Survey used the spelling Greensted, which has come to be the modern spelling.

Whereas the civil parish was just called Greensted, the ecclesiastical parish is officially called Greensted-juxta-Ongar, juxta coming from the Latin iuxta meaning "alongside".

== History ==
Greensted was an ancient parish in the Ongar Hundred of Essex. The main settlement in the parish was at Greensted Green to the west. The small settlement of Greensted itself was essentially a manorial complex comprising the medieval manor house of Greensted Hall, the adjoining parish church, and a couple of other houses. The parish also included at its eastern end part of the town of Chipping Ongar.

A church is known to have existed at Greensted from Saxon times. Archaeological excavations under the current church have found evidence of earlier timber buildings from the 6th and 7th centuries. The body of Edmund the Martyr, King of East Anglia, reputedly rested in the church in 1013 whilst being taken to its final burial place at Bury St Edmunds.

The current church building, dedicated to St Andrew, is said to be the oldest surviving wooden church in the world. It is unclear exactly when the current building was built; dendrochronology work in the early 1960s estimated the timbers of the nave were felled around the year 845, but further work in 1995 cast doubt on that dating and suggested a felling date a few years either side of 1053. The church was featured on a British postage stamp issued in April 1972.

The civil parish was abolished in 1965, becoming part of the parish of Ongar. At the 1961 census (the last before the abolition of the civil parish), Greensted had a population of 711. Most of that population lived in housing estates on the western edge of Chipping Ongar.
