= Thomas Shuldham O'Halloran (lawyer) =

Australian lawyer and sportsman

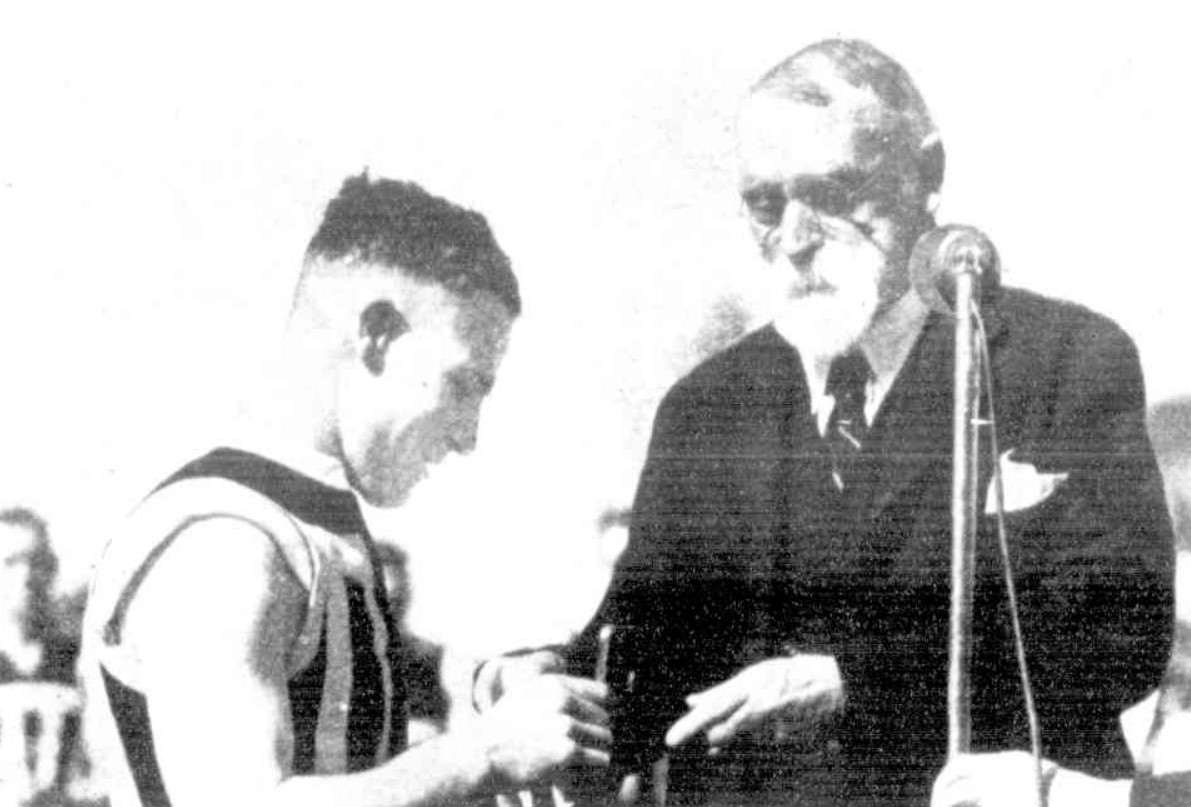
O'Halloran presenting Bob Quinn with the 1938 Magarey Medal.

Thomas Shuldham O'Halloran KC (23 February 1865 – 7 June 1945) was a lawyer and Australian rules football administrator in South Australia. He was a grandson of Thomas Shuldham O'Halloran, South Australia's first Police Commissioner.

== Early life and education ==
Thomas Shuldham O'Halloran was born on 23 February 1865 at O'Halloran Hill, South Australia, the eldest son of T. J. S. O'Halloran SM, and the grandson of his namesake, Major Thomas Shuldham O'Halloran, South Australia's first Police Commissioner. He was educated at St Peter's College and trained as a lawyer, reading his articles with Louis von Doussa at Mount Barker.

== Career ==
He was admitted to the bar in 1887 and joined in partnership with O. Mostyn Evan. He next joined the firm of Gordon, Nesbit, and Bright, then in 1896 started his own law office. In 1921 he took in as partner his nephew D. Bruce Ross, and was made King's Counsel in 1924. He retired in 1931.

He acted as solicitor for the Municipal Tramways Trust from its foundation, and was instrumental in draughting various statutes relating to industrial matters, notably the Industrial Code and the Early Closing Act.

He was appointed King's Counsel in 1924, and was elected president of the Law Society in 1926.

== Sporting and other interests ==
O'Halloran was prominent in a number of sports. In his youth he was a keen cricketer, playing for St. Peter's College and was a member of the South Australian team which played the All-England Eleven in 1882. He was a member of the Adelaide Gun Club, and the Adelaide Oval Bowling Club. He was president and chairman of the South Australian National Football League. He was elected Life Member of the S.A.N.F.L. and the Australian Football Council.

== Personal life ==
He and his wife Helen Ruth O'Halloran (ca.1877 – 22 August 1943) lived at Grove Street, Unley Park. They had no children.

== Death ==
He died on 7 June 1945.
