= Hopcraft =

Hopcraft is a family name. People with the name include:

- Arthur Hopcraft (1932–2004), English scriptwriter
- Benjamin Romans-Hopcraft, English guitarist in the band Warmduscher
- Matthew Hopcraft (born 1971), Australian reality TV contestant
- Miles Romans-Hopcraft (born 1989 or 1990), English musician under the name Wu-Lu
- Reginald Dawson Hopcraft Lough (1885–1958), Canadian officer in the British Royal Marines
- Robin Hopcraft, English trumpeter in the band Soothsayers
- W. S. Hopcraft (1848–1908), Anglican minister in South Australia
