= Arthur H. Otto =

Australian musician

Arthur Hermann Otto (10 February 1876 – ?) was an organist, composer, singer and teacher of music in Adelaide, South Australia. He had a later singing and teaching career in England as Arthur Kingston-Stewart.

== History ==
Otto was the only son of Frederick Hermann Otto (c. 1848 – 4 October 1894) and his wife Margaret Otto, née Stewart, (c. 1852 – 13 February 1934) who married in 1874. Frederick, a tobacconist, was a fine singer, a member and secretary of Adelaide Liedertafel. Their family home, from around 1890 to 1923, was "Bonella Villa", 204 Halifax Street, Adelaide.

He studied piano as a boy and by age 12 he was accompanying his father's singing at public concerts. He studied piano under Signor Emanuel de Beaupuis and organ under John Millard Dunn and was appointed his assistant organist and choirmaster of St. Peter's Cathedral sometime before 1896, when he himself was advertising for students.

In 1902 Rev. W. S. Hopcraft appointed Otto as organist and choirmaster for St John's Church, Adelaide, with the aim of reorganising and training the choir into the traditional Anglican cathedral model. He acted as accompanist to visiting artists Ada Crossley, Evangeline Florence and Johann Kruse. He taught piano and organ privately; a noted student was John Dempster, who would later follow him as organist at St. John's. His voice students include Harold Gard.

In 1908 he began giving vocal concerts, accompanied by Nora Kyffin Thomas on violin. He also acted as judge of singing contests organised by the Literary Societies' Union.

Dame Nellie Melba heard him sing, and advised further training in Europe. In November 1909 he and his wife left by the RMS Moldavia for Paris to undertake further vocal studies under Jean de Reszke.

In 1911 he and his wife adopted the surname Kingston-Stewart and enjoyed considerable popular success in England. He notably gave concerts for soldiers blinded by gas during the war, and spent some time touring. He then settled down in London as a singing teacher.

== Compositions ==
- Farewell Divinest Hope
- And They Glorified God (anthem)
- To Arms, Ye Brave (patriotic song, lyrics by R. Barrett) 1900
- Bobs March
- Century Exhibition Ode (lyrics by C. C. Paltridge) performed by the Adelaide Choral Society at the opening, 1900 Exhibition.
- Coronation Anthem 1902
- Exhibition Ode (lyrics by G. F. Chinner) similarly performed by the Adelaide Choral Society at the opening, 1910 Exhibition.
- The County Palatine 1913
- The Dear Old Home is Calling (lyrics by Hubi-Newcombe) 1914
- I Know a Little Woodland Nest (lyrics by P. J. O'Reilly) 1940

== Family ==
Arthur Hermann Otto married Blanche Victoria Barnfield (1876 – 2 November 1950) at St Peter's Cathedral on 26 September 1900. They had a son:

- Geoffrey Frederick Kingston Otto (11 February 1902 – )

Arthur and Blanche changed their surnames to Kingston-Stewart around 1911. Blanche's mother was previously a Kingston; Arthur's mother a Stewart. His mother reverted her surname to Stewart and left for London in 1923. His sister, May Otto, studied singing in London under Minna Fischer and later gave lessons. She also adopted the surname Stewart and later lived in Ruthven Mansions, Pulteney Street, Adelaide. She made many trips to London for extended visits to her brother.
