= John Dempster =

John Dempster may refer to:

- Jocky Dempster, John 'Jocky' Dempster, Scottish footballer who played in the 1970s for Queen of the South F.C. and had short spells with St. Mirren and Clyde F.C.
- John Dempster (footballer), footballer playing in the 21st century for Rushden and Diamonds, Oxford United and Kettering Town
- John Dempster (Medal of Honor), American Civil War sailor who received the Medal of Honor
- John Dempster (organist) (1885–1942), organist and choirmaster in Adelaide, South Australia
