= George Gross & Harry Who =

George Gross & Harry Who was an Australian women's fashion design company, based in Adelaide. Individual designs were labeled either "George Gross" or "Harry Who", named for the designers George Gross and Harry Watt. Gross's label specialized in classic styles of ladies' evening and occasional wear, and Watt's label catered for younger tastes, in brightly colored fashions.

== History ==
Gross was introduced to Watt at the venerable South Australian Hotel in the late 1960s [not late 1970s as sometimes reported] and were soon involved as a domestic couple. They lived for many years in leafy North Adelaide before sometime after 1994 moving into a luxury apartment in the Adelaide CBD.

George Gross ( – ) [rhymes with "boss"] was born in Hungary and studied to be a dentist before moving into fashion retail and later becoming a dress designer in Sydney. He has been described as a Holocaust survivor.

Harry Watt (c. 1937 – 23 September 2019) was a naval officer before becoming a designer. His brand name "Harry Who" was coined jocularly by a friend.

The two men decided to start a private company, bringing in Gross's twin sister Kathy Seymour, who had a boutique at Double Bay, Sydney, as a third partner in Seymour-Gross Pty Ltd and George Gross & Harry Who Design Company Pty Ltd, trading as "George Gross & Harry Who".

They opened a factory in Gilbert Street, Adelaide, and a sales outlet "Jap" in the Rundle Street Mall in 1973. They opened an outlet in Sydney six months later.

In later years they had outlets in Brisbane and Melbourne and a head office in Double Bay, Sydney. They also had concession spaces in some David Jones stores.

In 1987 they won a contract for State Bank employees' uniforms.

In their peak years they were represented at Harrods and had their own outlet on London's Fulham Road and in Saks Fifth Avenue and Neiman Marcus in the US as well as Hong Kong and Hawaii.

In 1994 Watt won a contract to design the uniforms for the Qantas staff, and retained that connection for around ten years.

Vogue Australia reported in 2014 that after 40 years they were leaving the business.

== Bibliography ==
- Rose Fydler. Threads, The Untold Story of Fashion House George Gross and Harry Who.
