= Thebarton, South Australia =

Thebarton
- Suburb
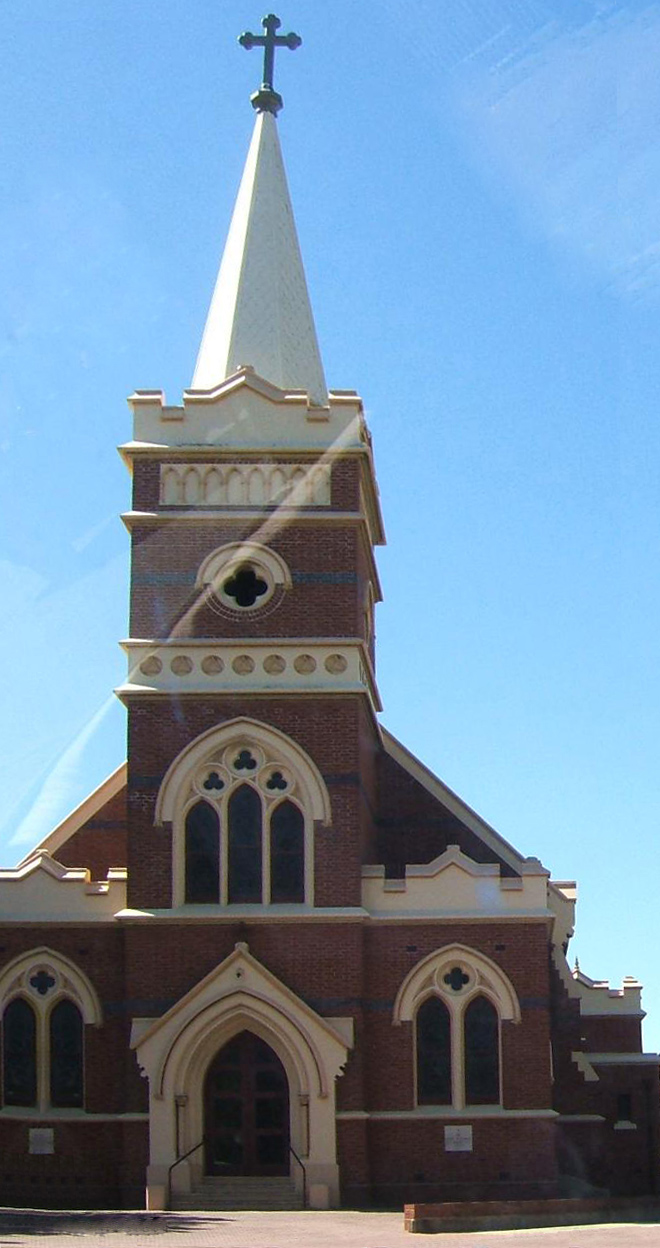
- Queen of Angels Roman Catholic church on the corner of South Road and Kintore Street, part of the Adelaide Cathedral Parish

- Country: Australia
- State: South Australia
- City: Adelaide
- LGA: City of West Torrens
- Location: 2 km (1.2 mi) W of Adelaide
- Established: 1839

Government
  - State electorate: West Torrens
  - Federal division: Adelaide

Population
  - Total: 1,442 (SAL 2021)
- Postcode: 5031
Suburbs around Thebarton
West Hindmarsh	Hindmarsh	Southwark
Torrensville	Thebarton	Southwark, Park Lands
Torrensville	Mile End	Park Lands

Thebarton (/ˈθɛbərtən/ THEB-ər-tən), formerly Theberton, on Kaurna land, is an inner-western suburb of Adelaide, South Australia in the City of West Torrens. The suburb is bounded by the River Torrens to the north, Port Road and Bonython Park to the east, Kintore Street to the south, and South Road to the west.

Many buildings and landmarks that bear the name of Thebarton were in the history municipality, the Town of Thebarton, which included most of the adjoining suburb of Torrensville. These include the Thebarton Oval, the Thebarton croquet and bowls club, Thebarton Theatre, and Thebarton Senior College. The historic Adelaide Gaol, nominally shown as being in Thebarton, and the adjacent Thebarton Barracks of the South Australia Police actually lie within the northwestern Adelaide Park Lands. A part of Thebarton adjacent to the River Torrens, later the site of the South Australian Brewing Company, was originally known as Southwark (/ˈsʌðərk/). Hemmington, Hemmington West and West Thebarton were also suburbs later incorporated into current-day Thebarton.

On 14 January 2025, a new suburb was announced within Thebarton, reverting to the name Southwark within its historical boundaries laid out in 1881. This is the site of new housing being developed by Renewal SA on the site of the former West End Brewery. Southwark also contains a number of existing dwellings that were previously within Thebarton's remit.

== History ==
Prior to European settlement of South Australia, the areas now known as Thebarton and Hindmarsh were called Karraundongga (meaning "red gum spear place") by the Kaurna people, who would craft spears from the red gum branches gathered on the banks of the Torrens there.

The suburb of Thebarton includes the first section of land surveyed outside of the Adelaide city centre (then known as South Adelaide) and North Adelaide. Preliminary section 1 was granted to Colonel William Light of Adelaide on 12 May 1838. It was named after the home of Light, the first Surveyor-General of the colony of South Australia, where he lived with his de facto wife Maria Gandy and her brothers. Light named his home after Theberton Hall of Suffolk, England, where he was educated. The area was known as Theberton until approximately 1840, with the variant spelling now accredited to a typographical error, rather than a corruption of "The Barton", based on the Old English bere-tun, meaning "barley farm", as was thought for some time.

Colonel Light surveyed the town-acre as Section 1 and built Theberton Cottage towards the northern part of the area. The area was first subdivided for housing in February 1839, although it took a number of years for the housing to establish, Thebarton Post Office opening on 24 October 1850. By 1866 the population was estimated at 450 people.

Thebarton Racecourse, which operated from as early as 1838 to 1869, was formed on grazing land in the area now known as Mile End, and later subdivided and completely built over.

The foundation stone of the original Thebarton Town Hall, designed by Alfred Wells and Latham Withall and built by James King, was laid in 1885. However it was gutted by fire in 1948, with its rebuilding and restoration described as "thoroughly horrible" in 1999.

The Torrenside Brewery, next to the Torrens on Port Road, was founded in 1886 by A. W. & T. L. Ware, in the then suburb of Southwark. After acquisition by the Walkerville Co-operative Brewing Company Ltd, and its subsequent acquisition by the South Australian Brewing Company in 1939, it was renamed from Walkerville Brewery to Southwark Brewery in 1949 and the company's Walkerville Nathan beer was renamed Southwark beer in 1951. The brewery closed on 17 June 2021, with its landmark chimney tower heritage-listed, to be preserved when the site is redeveloped. The artefacts in its on-site museum are being donated to the State Library of South Australia and other local institutions.

In September 2023 the Government of South Australia under Peter Malinauskas bought the brewery site from Lion, to redevelop into housing under Renewal SA. As of January 2025, 1300 homes are planned for the 8.4 hectares (21 acres) site, with some ready for habitation by the end of 2026. The state heritage-listed brewery tower and Light's cottage, will remain within the new development. On 14 January 2025 the government announced the restoration of the Southwark suburb within its historical boundaries laid out in 1881, being the extent of the current redevelopment. Consultation would take place with around 420 homes and businesses within a larger area south of the development, (Note: Eastwards to Port Road, southwards to Light Terrace, and westwards to Dew and Stirling.) with a decision expected by the end of 2025.

== Local government ==
Thebarton was part of the then largely rural District of West Torrens until 1883, when the residents of the more urban suburbs of Thebarton, Mile End and Torrensville successfully petitioned to become the Corporation of the Town of Thebarton.

In 1997 the Town of Thebarton re-amalgamated with the City of West Torrens.

== Demographics ==
Historical population
Year	Pop.	±%
2001	1,278	—
2006	1,327	+3.8%
2011	1,322	−0.4%
2016	1,431	+8.2%

Thebarton has a significant Greek-Australian population and has been the suburb with the largest Greek Australian population per capita in Australia.

== Facilities and entertainment ==
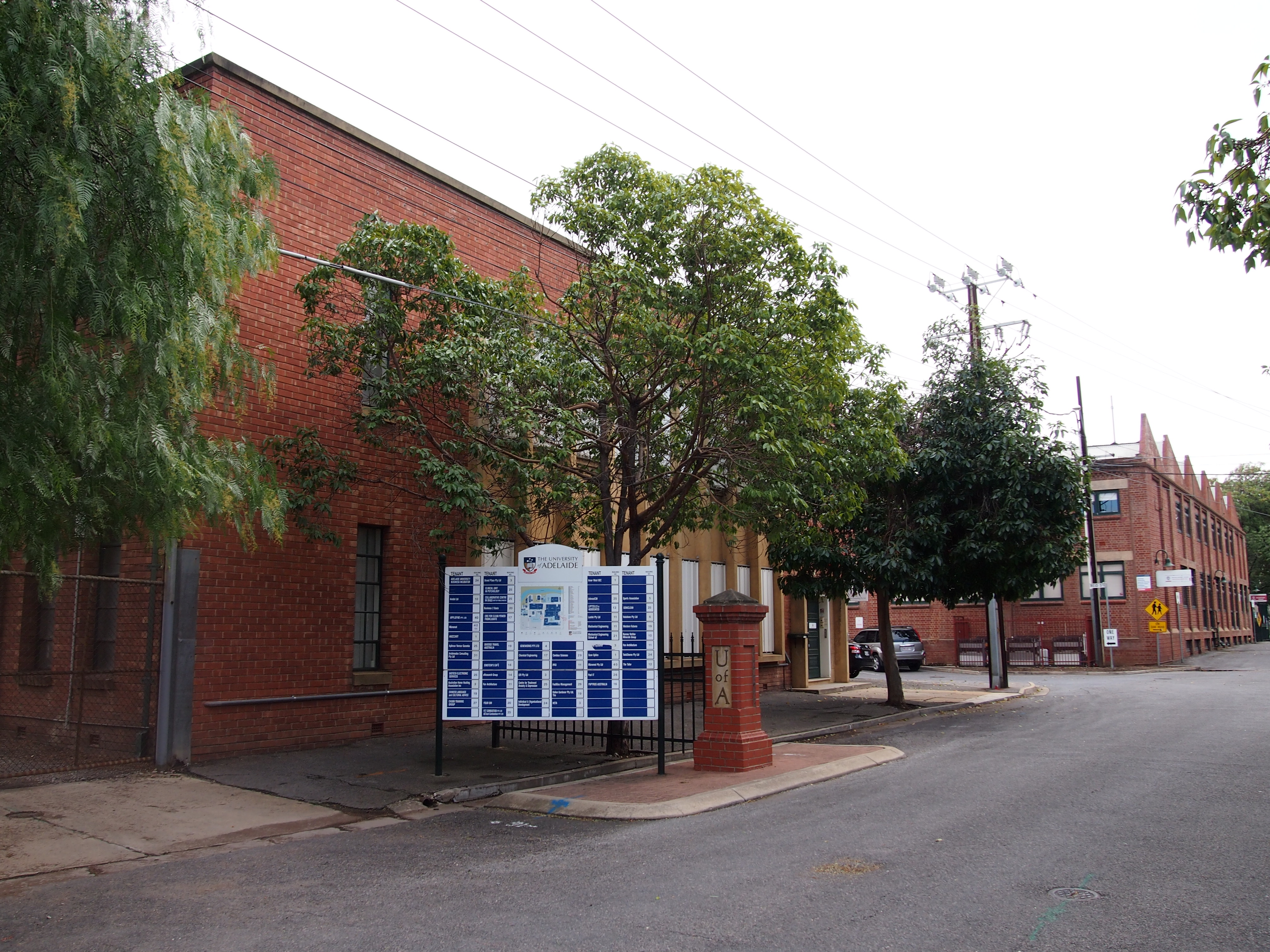
Stirling Street entrance to the University of Adelaide's Thebarton Campus

The Thebarton campus of the University of Adelaide, also known as Adelaide University Research Park, occupies a complex of former industrial buildings in the northeastern corner of the suburb.

The Wheatsheaf Hotel in George Street is a popular pub and music venue. It offers craft beers and wine from small producers, and also brews its own beers. Apart from regularly showcasing live music, "the Wheaty" also hosts book clubs, Morris dancers, knitting groups, and roller-derby parties. In 2017, the Wheaty Brewing Corps was named Australia's best small brewery at the national Craft Beer Awards, and it has been inducted into the SA Music Hall of Fame. In 2021 it started selling its own beers in cans, to take away.

== Landmarks ==
- St George Greek Orthodox Church on Rose Street, Adelaide's largest Greek Orthodox church
- The Ice Arena, home of the Adelaide Adrenalines, who play in the Australian Ice Hockey League
- Thebarton Oval, former home of the West Torrens Football Club in the South Australian National Football League; now home to the Adelaide Footy League.
- The Thebarton Incinerator on West Thebarton Road was designed by Walter Burley Griffin in 1935, completed in 1937, and decommissioned in 1964. It is one of two Burley Griffin buildings listed among the 120 nationally significant 20th-century buildings in South Australia, the other being the Hindmarsh Incinerator at Brompton.
- The West End Brewery at 107 Port Road (closed June 2021).
- The well-known Thebarton Theatre (originally built as the town hall) is actually in the neighbouring suburb of Torrensville.
- The Adelaide Gaol is easterly-adjacent to Thebarton in the western Adelaide parklands.
- A rectangular memorial on the corner of Albert and Maria Streets, dedicated to Maria Gandy, William Light's partner, was unveiled on the 200th anniversary of her birth on 23 November 2011. On each of four sides is an inscription celebrating her roles as pioneer, settler, carer and mother.
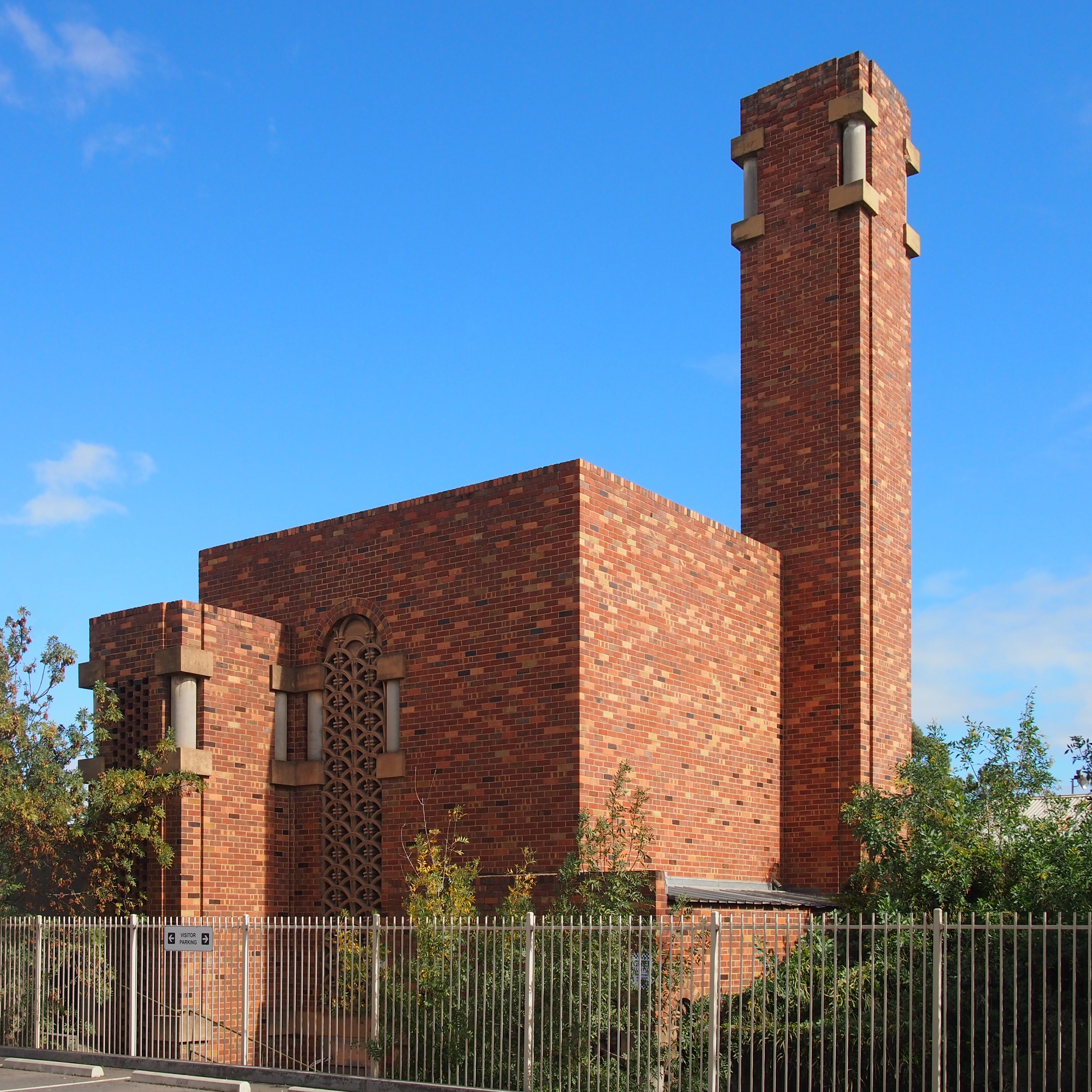
The incinerator at 34 West Thebarton Road was designed by noted American architect Walter Burley Griffin, who designed Canberra. The design, including exquisite tiles detail in this photo, was to mollify the local council, which did not want it within council boundaries.

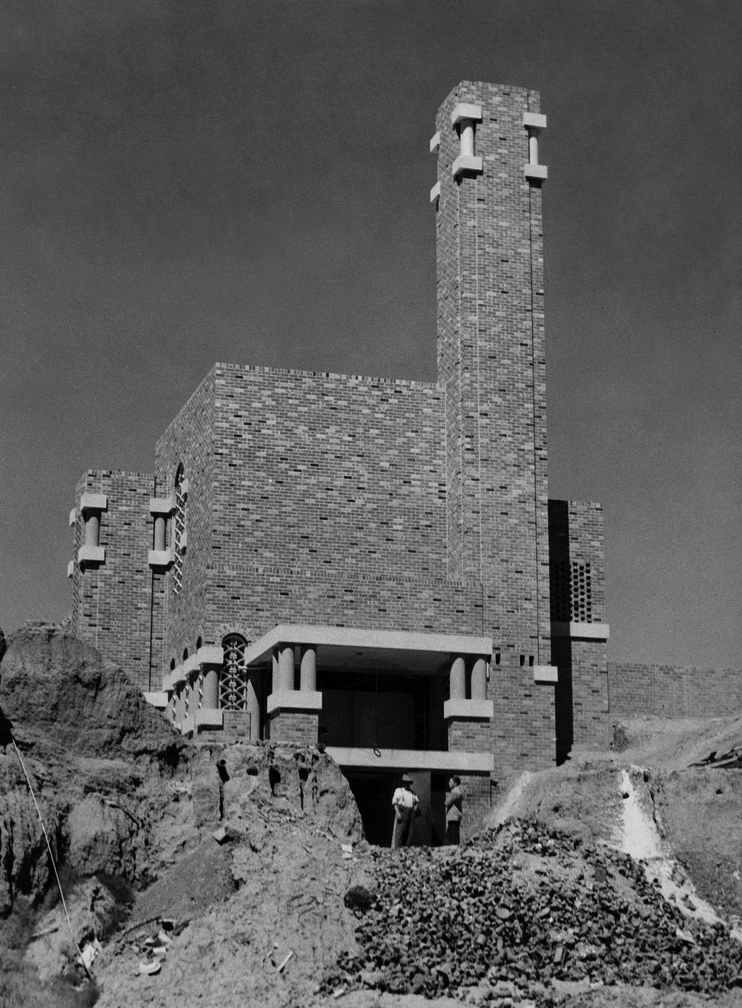
The newly constructed incinerator in 1937. Garbage was tipped in at road level and a reverberatory furnace reduced the garbage to ash, which was fed into this pit to enable the area to be reclaimed.

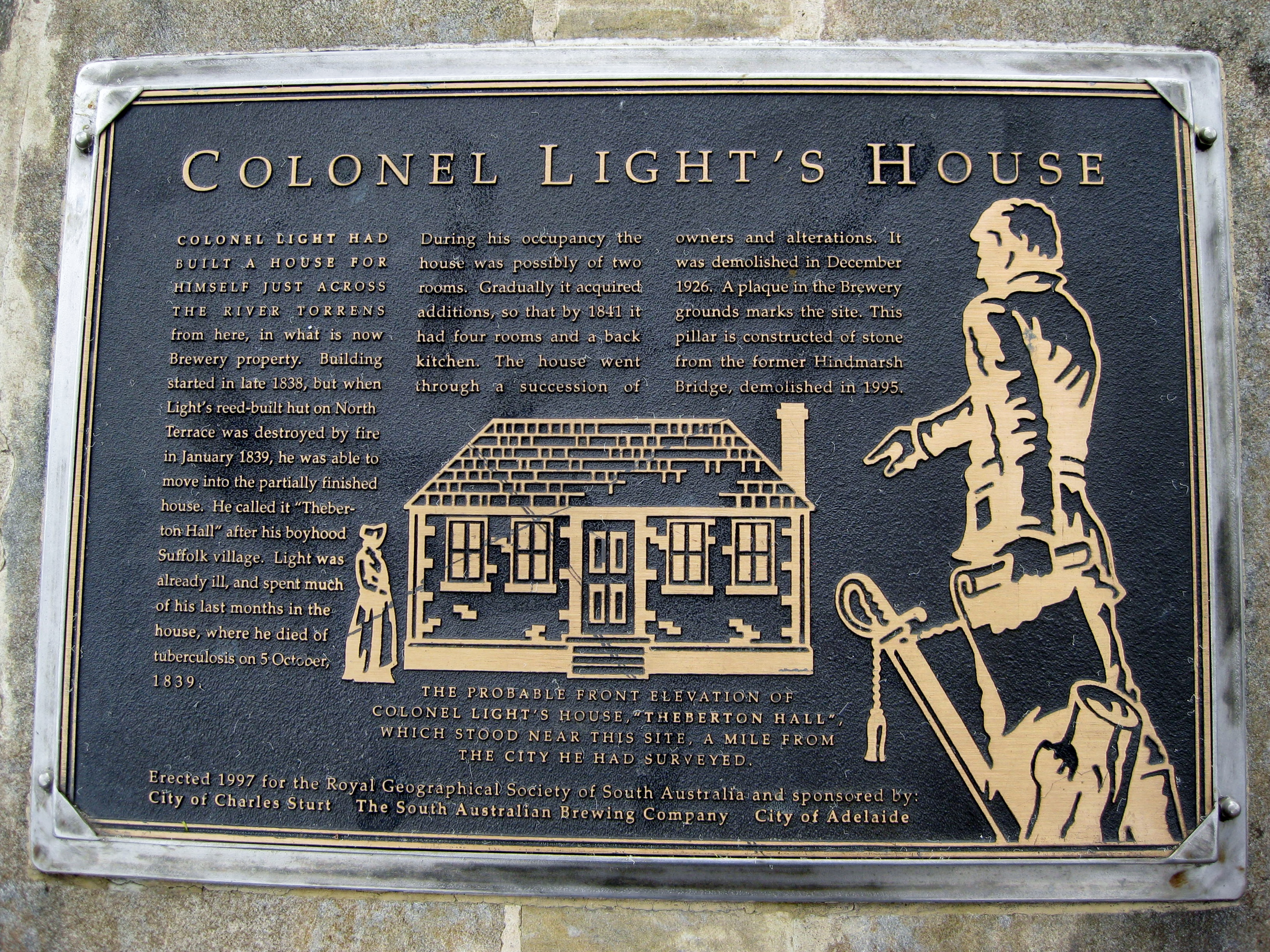
Plaque commemorating Light's "Theberton Hall", demolished 1926. Cast in 1997, its pillar was constructed from remnants of the Hindmarsh Bridge, demolished 1995, and is located across the River Torrens from the site of the Southwark brewery, demolished in the 2020s.

== Heritage listings ==
Thebarton has a number of heritage-listed sites, including:

- 39A Dew Street: Lady Gowrie Child Centre
- 1 George Street: Squatters Arms Hotel
- 42 and 42A Phillips Street: Thebarton Baptist Church and Hall
- 77 Port Road: Southwark Hotel (pronounced /ˈsʌðərk/ SUDH-ərk)
- 107 Port Road, site of the West End Brewery:
  - Plaque only – Site of Colonel Light's Cottage (13 December 2001)
  - Remains of `Theberton Hall' Colonel William Light's House (including Underground Room, Underground Tank and Well) (provisionally added 20 May 2021)
  - Walkerville Brewhouse Tower, built 1886, enlarged 1898–1899, doubled in size 1901–1903, one of a few remaining and one of the largest examples of a brewhouse tower in South Australia (provisionally added 20 May 2021)
  - Electric Supply Company Transformer (13 December 2001)
- 35-37 Stirling Street: Faulding's Eucalyptus Oil Distillery
- 34-36 West Thebarton Road: Thebarton Incinerator

== Tram stop ==
Thebarton is also the location of a stop on the Glenelg tram line.

Preceding station	Adelaide Metro	Following station
Bonython Park towards Adelaide Entertainment Centre	Glenelg tram line Limited service	Royal Adelaide Hospital towards Moseley Square or Botanic Gardens
