= Alfred Wells (architect) =

Australian architect (1859–1935)

Alfred Wells (16 May 1859 – 8 December 1935) was an architect in South Australia.

== Early life and education ==
Alfred was born at Marryatville, Adelaide, a son of Percy Wells and his wife Caroline (1831–1901). He was educated at Thomas Caterer's school in Norwood.

In 1871 the family returned to England aboard the Yatala, which was wrecked off the coast of France en route, but without loss of life. He undertook further schooling in Surrey, then studied architecture in London, returning to Adelaide in 1879.

== Career ==
Wells soon found employment with the Engineer-in-Chief's Department under H. C. Mais. He worked for a time with Edmund Wright before returning to the Architect-in-Chief's Department under E. J. Woods, then with Ernest H. Bayer and Latham A. Withall.

In 1885 Bayer left the partnership and Wells took his place. Withall and Wells were in 1885 responsible for two of Adelaide's outstanding structures: the Adelaide Arcade and the Jubilee Exhibition Building (demolished c. 1965), both of which sported ornamental domes.

In 1888 Withall and his family left for Britain, never to return, and Wells ran the business alone, designing for the Adelaide Children's Hospital (now Women's and Children's Hospital) two structures which still stand: the heritage-listed Allan Campbell and the Angas Buildings.

In 1897 he was commissioned to design St Columba's Anglican Church on Napier Road (now Cross Rd) in Hawthorn, which he did in a neo-Gothic style. The church was built in 1898.

Other high-profile buildings for which he was responsible were:

- the original single-storey building for the Adelaide Electric Supply Company in 1901 on the corner of Grenfell Street and East Terrace (now Tandanya National Aboriginal Cultural Institute)
- Brookman Building(s) on Grenfell Street (now the site of the Grenfell Centre)
- Norwood Town Hall (still standing)
- Thebarton Town Hall, Thebarton (built from 1885, gutted by fire in 1948, with its rebuilding and restoration described as "thoroughly horrible" in 1999)
- South Australian Hotel on North Terrace (where The Beatles stayed in 1964; demolished to make way for the Stamford Plaza Hotel in 1971)

== Later life and death ==
Wells retired in 1926, and died at Memorial Hospital, North Adelaide in 1935.

== Other activities ==
He served as councillor for the City of St. Peters and, like his father, was a prominent Freemason.

== Family ==
Wells married Gertrude E. Pollock (3 December 1860? – 8 January 1946) on 29 August 1883, living at "Rathmines" in Collinswood; they had two sons and two daughters:

- Alfred Cuthbert Wells (1884 – 30 December 1952) married Angelica Leslie Pooler (1888–) on 30 July 1910
- Geoffrey Erskine Wells (22 January 1891 – 6 October 1917) was, as Captain Wells of 2nd AIF, killed in action, Belgium.
- (Marjorie) Gertrude Wells (25 January 1888 – ) married John Digby Yeatman MM (c. January 1890 – ) on 25 September 1920. She at one time inherited a painting by Whistler, later purchased by the Art Gallery of South Australia
- Audrey Hall Wells (7 July 1897 – 24 October 1953) married Capt. Oscar William Chalker MC (27 July 1894 – 10 December 1953) on 20 September 1927, lived at Oak Lodge, Mount Lofty. He died of an injury to the back of his head, presumably accidental.
