= Latham Withall =

British architect

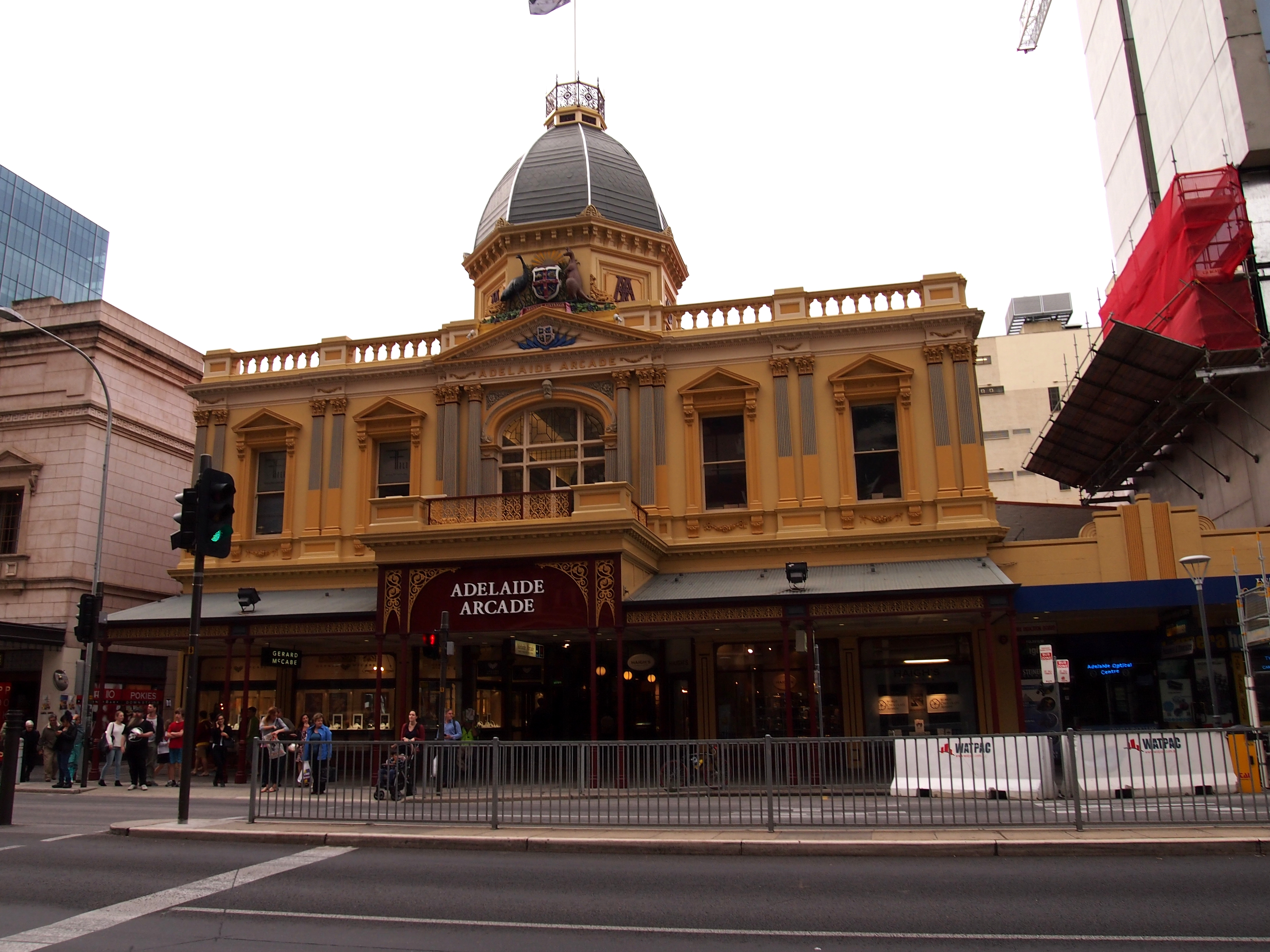
Adelaide Arcade, Grenfell Street end

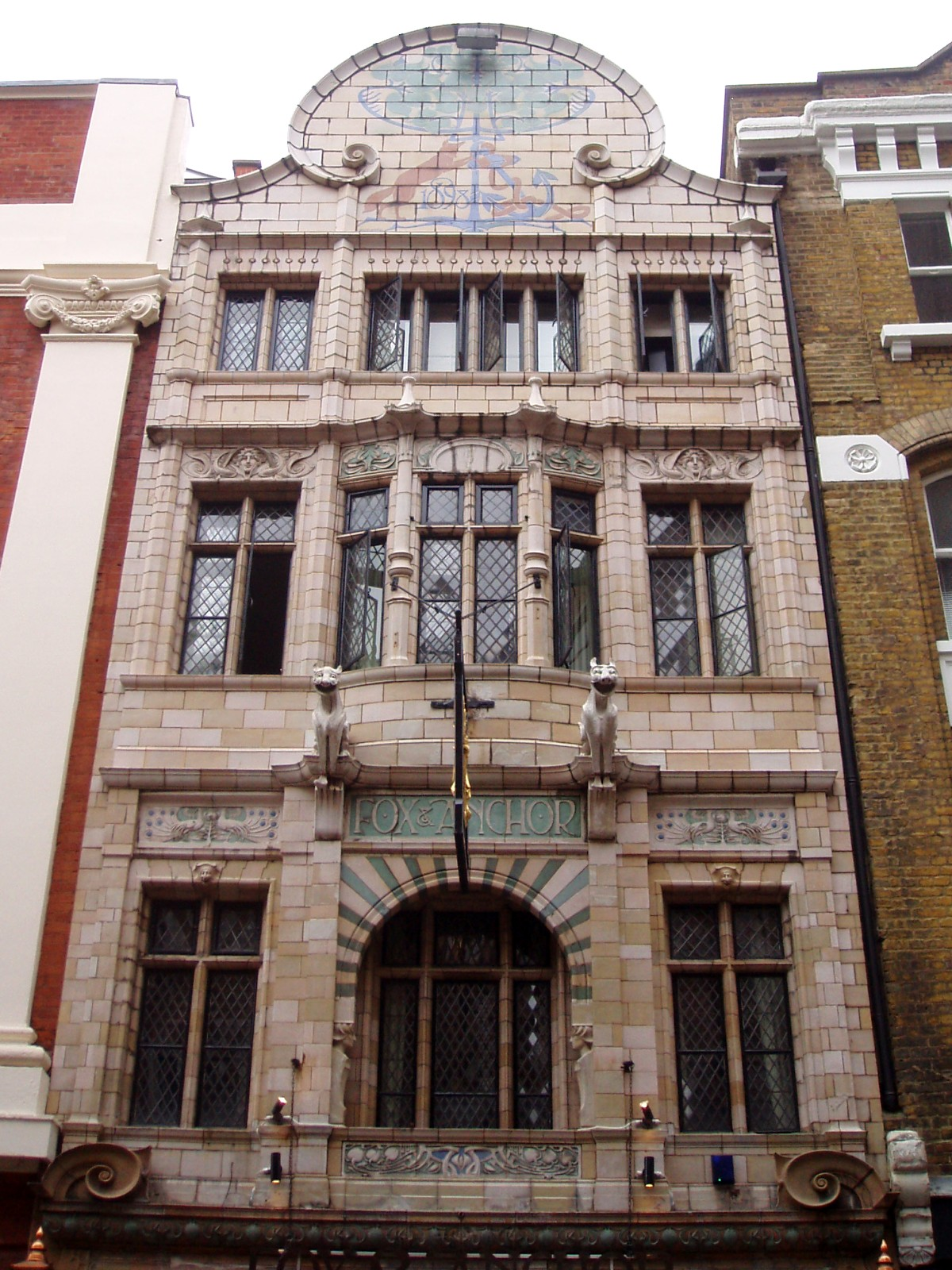
The Fox and Anchor

Latham Augustus Withall OBE (1853 – 16 January 1925) was a British architect who practised in Adelaide, South Australia from 1876 to 1888. His middle name is frequently rendered as "August".

He served a five-year apprenticeship with Thomas Chatfield Clarke FRIBA.

He arrived in Adelaide, South Australia sometime before 1876, and by August 1878 was proprietor of the Royal Hotel, Port Augusta.

While in Adelaide he was in partnership with Ernest H. Bayer 1879–1884, then with their draftsman Alfred Wells. Work with Wells included the Adelaide Arcade and Thebarton Town Hall in 1885, and the Jubilee Exhibition Building in 1886. After Withall and his family returned to England in 1888, Wells and the firm designed the new (1892) Stock Exchange Building, and the Angas and Allen Campbell Buildings of the Adelaide Children's Hospital.

Withall was the architect of the Fox and Anchor, a Grade II listed public house at 115 Charterhouse Street, Farringdon, London, built in 1898.

Sometime before 1905 he left Suffolk (Reigate, Surrey?) for Perth, Western Australia, where he began working as a construction engineer for the Water Supply Department. In 1915 he volunteered for service with the First AIF, and returned to England, where he worked as architectural superintendent of the Australian military hospitals in Essex with the rank of Captain, service for which he was accorded an OBE in the 1919 Birthday Honours. He died in London.

== Family ==
Withall married Louisa Margaret Reed in Adelaide on 18 April 1876. Their children included:

- Adelaide Withall (26 January 1877 – ) married Archie W. Woodyatt in Reigate on 10 October 1901
- Richard Henry Withall (10 May 1879 – ) awarded Military Medal
- Letitia Withall (30 August 1881 – )
- Osborn Withall (27 January 1884 – 1972) returned to South Australia, married Lily Augusta Hall ( – 1976) of Unley on 28 March 1911, lived at "Challana", Streaky Bay
- Latham Withall (10 August 1886 – 23 March 1971) returned to Australia, living in Jolimont, later East Melbourne; married Mabel Pearson; enlisted with the 1st AIF November 1917, promoted S/Sgt with Ordnance Corps; was director of Associated Chambers of Manufactures of Australia.
