= W. S. Hopcraft =

Canon William Samuel Hopcraft (25 August 1848 – 9 June 1908) was a minister of the Anglican church in South Australia, known as a "gifted orator".

== History ==
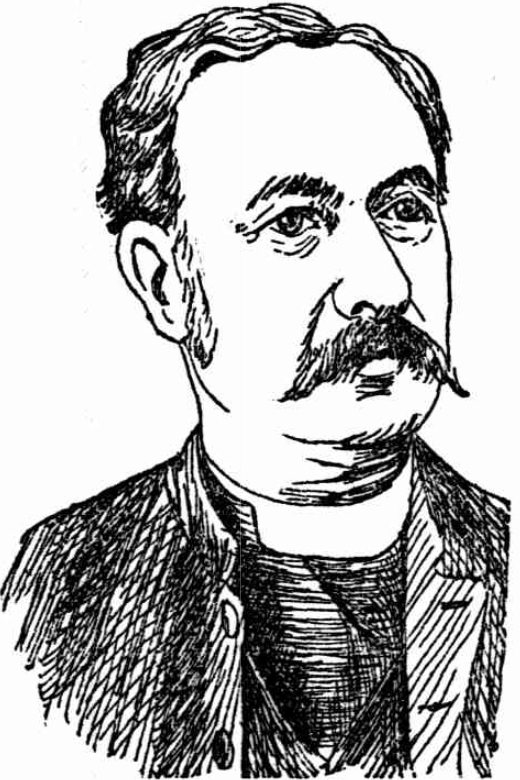
Canon Hopcraft

Hopcraft was born in Wolverhampton, England, the son of a Presbyterian elder. On leaving school his father secured for him a position with the building company of Horsman & Co., with prospects of a future partnership, but his mind was set on the church ministry, and volunteered for work as a home missionary. His talents in this direction were recognised by the Bishop of Liverpool, who urged him to take the theological course at St Aidan's College, and having completed it, enrolled with Cambridge University, achieving first-class honours in Preliminary Theology. He was given a curacy in the diocese of Carlisle, and in 1833 was ordained a deacon for the parish of Workington by Dr Harvey Goodwin. Six months later he was accepted as a priest, assisted by a junior curate, with 12,000 parishioners. He was urged by Rev. A. G. Rawstorne to accept an invitation to South Australia, which he accepted, and in 1886 was appointed by Bishop Kennion to the district of Petersburg (later Peterborough).

Under his leadership, new church buildings were erected at Petersburg, Hammond, and Carrieton, and a disused church in Terowie was purchased. The finances of churches in Jamestown, Orroroo and Petersburg improved greatly under his guidance, and when the diocese was divided into rural deaneries, Hopcraft was elected Rural Dean of Petersburg.

He was appointed to St Augustines Church, Port Augusta in 1890, and was instrumental in having new churches erected at Port Augusta West and Blinman. He was appointed to St John's Church, Adelaide in 1895, as the successor to Canon Poole.
