= Bank of South Australia (1837) =

The first Bank of South Australia was founded by the South Australian Company in the colony of South Australia in 1837 by British investors. In 1892 it was taken over by the Union Bank of Australia.

== History ==
The Bank of South Australia was created in 1837 by British investors, closely supervised by British directors, but utilising the knowledge and advice of local managers in South Australia. From 1840, it was associated with or a subsidiary of the South Australian Banking Company.

Then in 1851 came the Victorian gold rush, and the colony was not only beset with a shortage of workers, but a financial crisis due to the sudden increase in the availability of gold and the lack of sufficient currency to pay for it. The manager, George Tinline, created an assay office and mint, and the conversion of some of the diggers' gold to bullion which could be used as a form of currency. A Bullion Act was passed and some 25,000 £1 coins were minted, but were not recognised as legal currency by the Bank of England. Tinline was awarded a purse of 2,000 guineas (£2,200; several millions of dollars in today's money), and an elaborate silver salver (now in the Art Gallery of South Australia). Tinline was sacked by the bank in 1859 after severe losses caused by a customer defaulting.

The bank's first permanent head office opened in 1857 on North Terrace, opposite the Railway Station. It soon proved to be a profitable business, and in 1874 preparations were begun by manager W. G. Cuthbertson for an even more impressive building on King William Street, designed by Edmund W. Wright and Lloyd Tayler, which opened for business on 21 June 1878. In 1879 the old bank became "Trew's South Australian Club Hotel", later known as the South Australian Hotel.

== Foundation ==
Officers:

- David McLaren, manager
- Edward Stephens, cashier and acting manager

Board of Directors:

- George Fife Angas
- Raikes Currie, M.P.
- Charles Hindley, M.P.
- Henry Kingscote
- John Pirie
- Christopher Rawson
- John Rundle, M.P.
- Thomas Smith
- James Ruddell-Todd
- Henry Waymouth

== Managers ==
(full title "Colonial Manager", as resident in South Australia)

- David McLaren 1837
- Edward Stephens – officially from 1841 (but in practice from a much earlier date) to c. 1856
- John Coleman Dixon (acting manager, then manager of South Australian Banking Company / Bank of South Australia from 1855 to 1865)
- William Selby Douglas (previously manager Gawler branch) 1864 to 1869
- Thomas Drury Smeaton (previously manager Robe branch) occasionally between 1870 and 1884
- William Gilmour Cuthbertson 1873–1878?
- John Currie 1879 to 1884
- Vipont Howgate 1884 to 1886
- Anderson (acting pro tem)
- John White Meldrum (died 12 January 1898) 1887 to 1891
- J. L. Ogilvie (1891 to 1892)

In 1892, under pressure of falling share values, and following collapse of banks in Victoria, the Bank of South Australia was taken over by the Union Bank of Australia.
