= Southwark, South Australia =

Southwark
- Suburb
- Country: Australia
- State: South Australia
- City: Adelaide
- LGA: City of West Torrens
- Location: 3 km (1.9 mi) NW of Adelaide CBD
- Established: 2025

Government
  - State electorate: West Torrens
  - Federal division: Adelaide

Population
  - Total: c. 20
- Postcode: 5031
Suburbs around Southwark
Hindmarsh	Hindmarsh	North Adelaide
Thebarton	Southwark	Adelaide
Thebarton	Thebarton	Adelaide

Southwark (pronounced /ˈsʌðək/) is an inner western suburb of Adelaide, South Australia, located in the City of West Torrens (of which it is the most north-easterly point). It was officially created on 31 October 2025, (Note: Notice of suburb creation published in the South Australian Government Gazette one day prior, on 30 October 2025.) adopting the precinct's original name as before its incorporation into Thebarton in the mid-1900s.

Southwark comprises established residential and commercial land that was brought into its remit, including existing venues such as the historic Southwark Hotel. The suburb will later encompass the housing estate of "Southwark Grounds" (to be completed by 2035; situated on the site of the former West End Brewery).
