= Norwood Town Hall =

Town hall in the suburb of Norwood in Adelaide, South Australia

Coordinates: 34°55′15″S 138°38′11″E

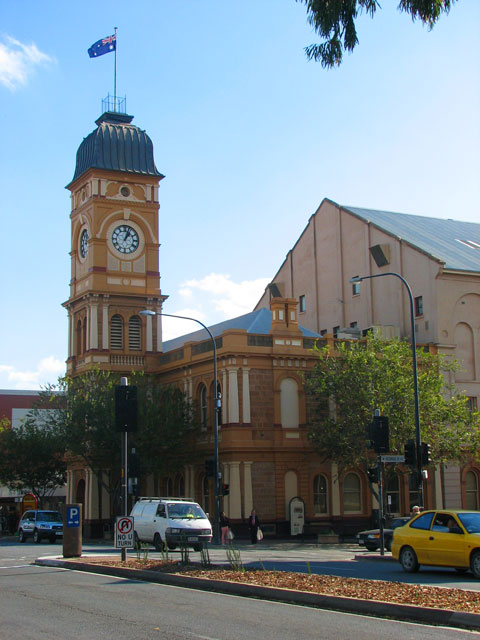
- Interactive map of the Norwood Town Hall area

General information
- Type: Town hall
- Architectural style: Classical
- Location: 175 The Parade, Norwood, South Australia, Australia
- Completed: 1882
- Opened: 1883
- Landlord: City of Norwood Payneham St Peters

Design and construction
- Architect: Alfred Wells
- Architecture firm: Bayer and Withall

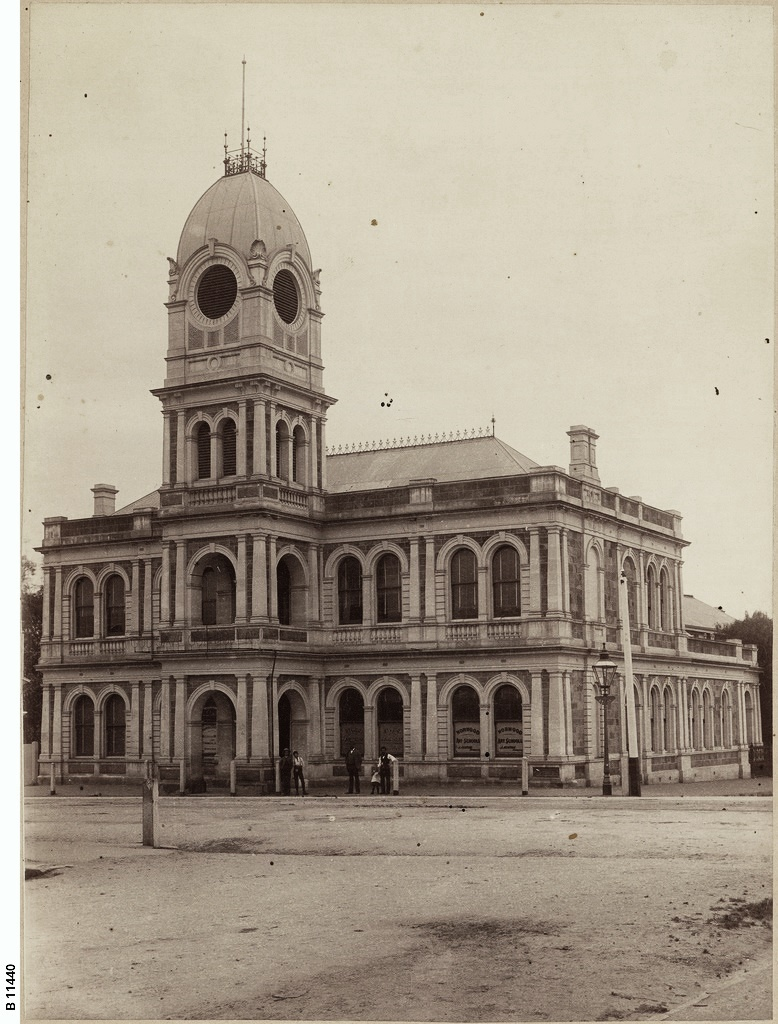
Norwood Town Hall in the 1880s

The Norwood Town Hall is the council seat of the City of Norwood Payneham & St Peters, and the building includes a number of other venues. It is located at 175 The Parade in Norwood, an inner-eastern suburb of greater Adelaide, South Australia, five minutes east of the city centre. The current town hall building was completed in 1883, with the large concert hall added at the back between 1914 and 1918.

The former City of Kensington and Norwood was the first outside of the City of Adelaide to receive the right to set up their own municipal corporation. The charter of the town was given on 7 July 1853 by the Governor, Sir Henry Young, and the original town hall building, constructed in 1859, was the first town hall built in South Australia.

The current building was designed by Alfred Wells, who then worked as an architectural draughtsman for the firm Bayer and Withall, after his design had won a competition held in 1881. The classical style building opened in 1883 and included civic offices and a banqueting hall to service the growing town.

The Town Hall clock, which was gifted by then mayor Sir Edwin Thomas Smith in 1890, is a local landmark.

The Town Hall's concert hall was added during World War I, instigated by then mayor Henry J. Holden. At that time, it was the largest venue of the type in the state.

Films were screened in the hall from 7 May 1897. In the 1940s the building became part of D. Clifford Theatres Ltd and was later taken over by Greater Union Cinemas.

The building was listed in the South Australian Heritage Register on 28 November 1985.

The concert hall is featured in the film Shine, with Geoffrey Rush playing the role of the pianist David Helfgott, who is seen in the movie playing the music of Franz Liszt. The Bösendorfer grand piano loaned by the Australian Society of Keyboard Music had to be winched up to the first floor hall. The piano is now stored in the Pilgrim Church, Flinders Street in Adelaide, where it is used for recitals each week.
