= Community and Parish of Saint George Thebarton, Adelaide, South Australia =

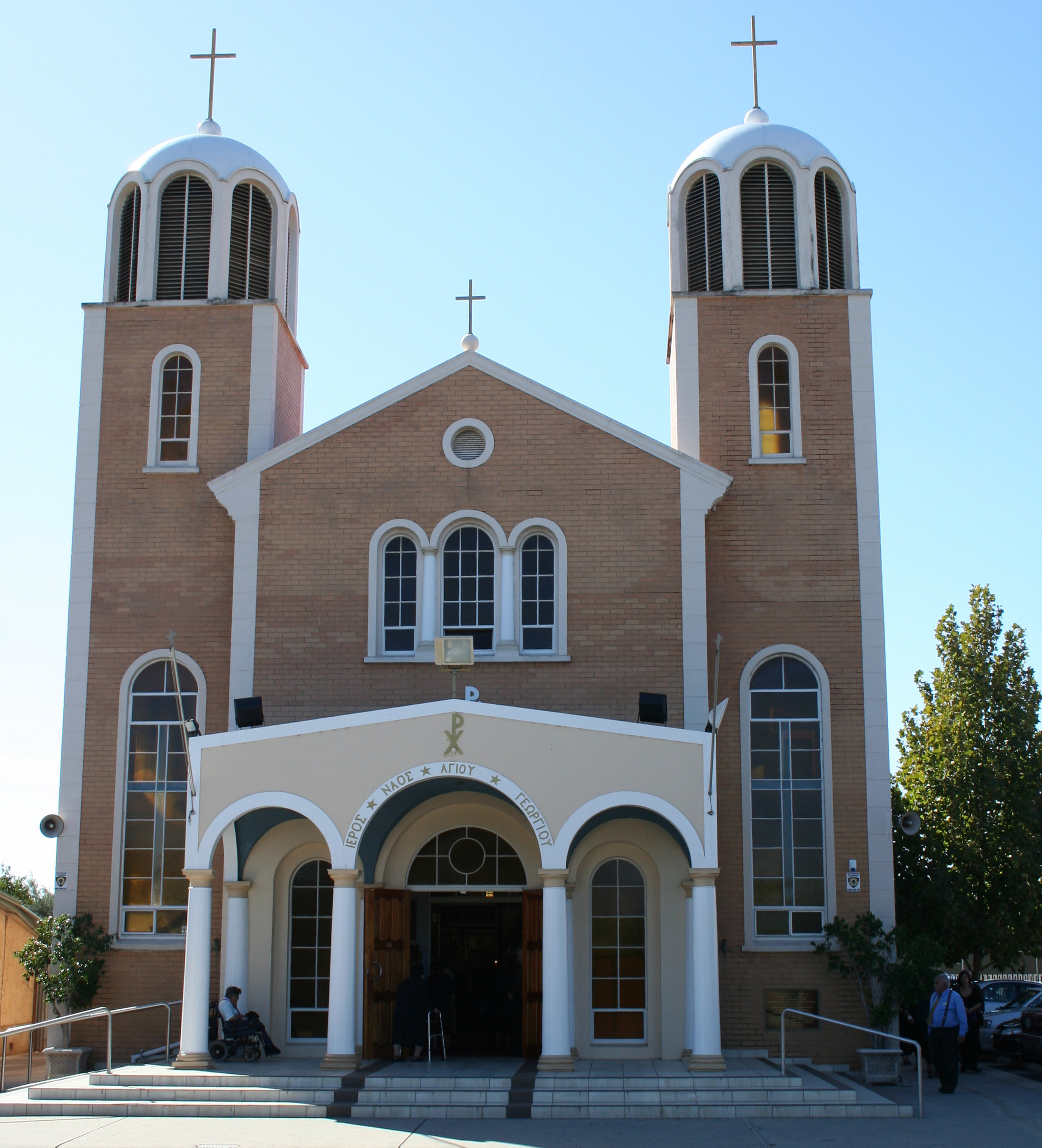
The exterior of the Church

The Greek Orthodox Church of St. George is a church in the suburb of Mile End, in the South Australian capital of Adelaide. It is under the auspices of the Greek Orthodox Archdiocese of Australia and spiritual direction of Archbishop Makarios of Australia and is the largest Greek Orthodox church in Adelaide. This is partly due to the high population of Greek Australians in the area, mostly from Thebarton, Torrensville and Mile End.

== Greeks of North-East West Torrens ==
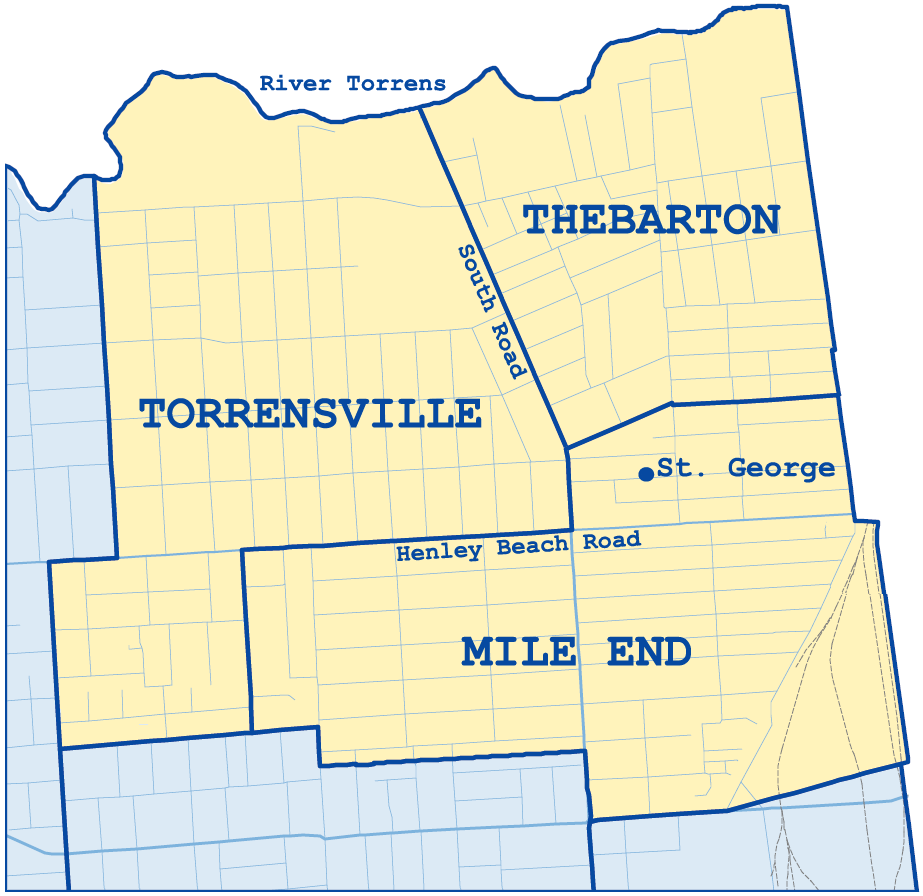
The church is located at the centre of the three suburbs, that are densely populated by Greek-Australians

Throughout the 1950s the area became home to a large number of Greek migrants, and by 1966 they formed 13.4 per cent of the population in Thebarton.

The "Greek Orthodox Community and Parish of Saint George Thebarton and Western Suburbs Inc." was formed in 1960 to help the expatriate Greeks, and in 1965 the members of that community built St. George's church.

Today, the suburbs of Torrensville and Thebarton have a significant Greek Australian population, with 4,471 Greek Australians living in the area, that is 18.7 per cent of the total population, according to census data released by the Australian Bureau of Statistics in 2001.

== Gallery ==
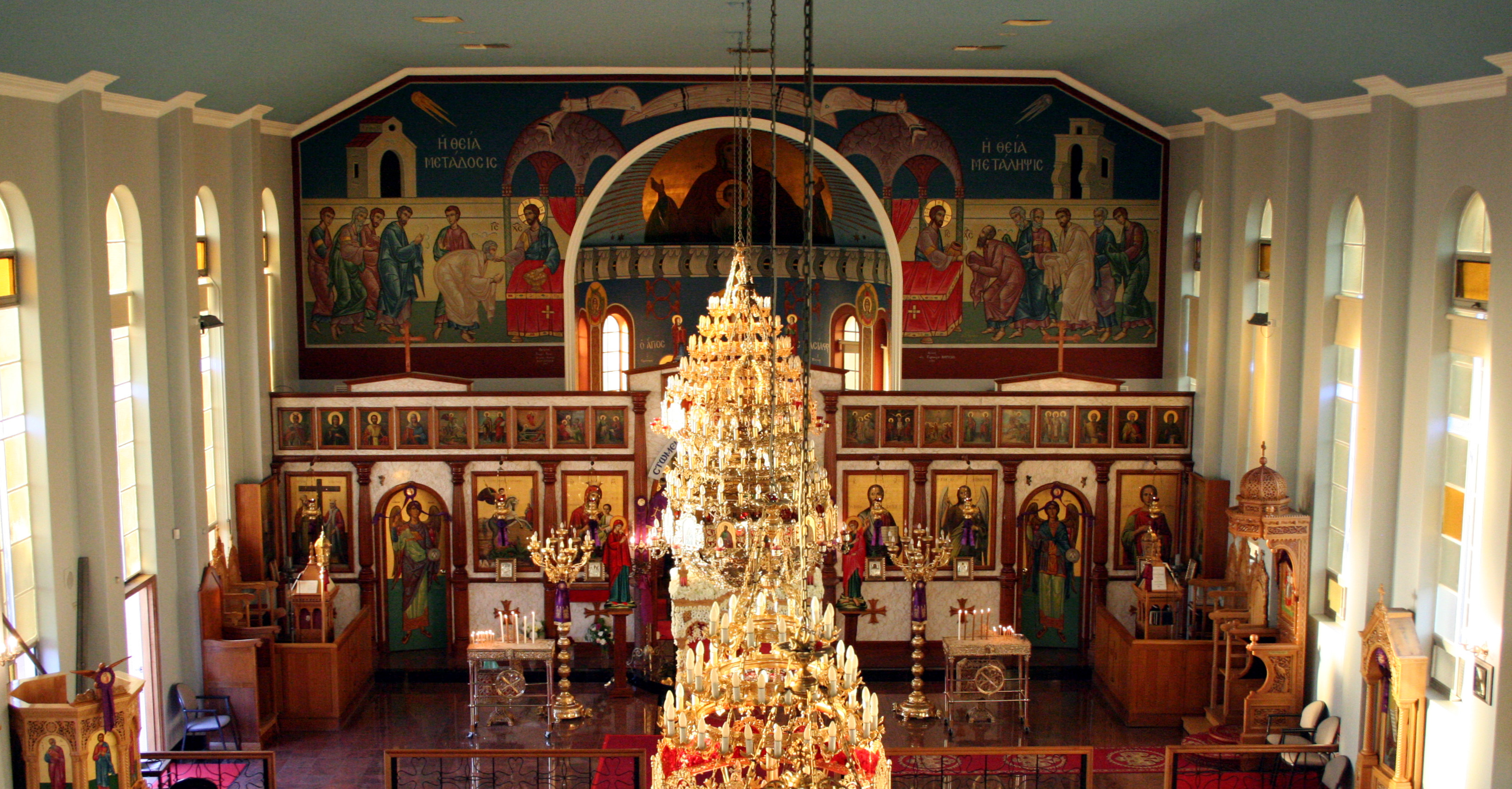
The front section of the inside. (2007)

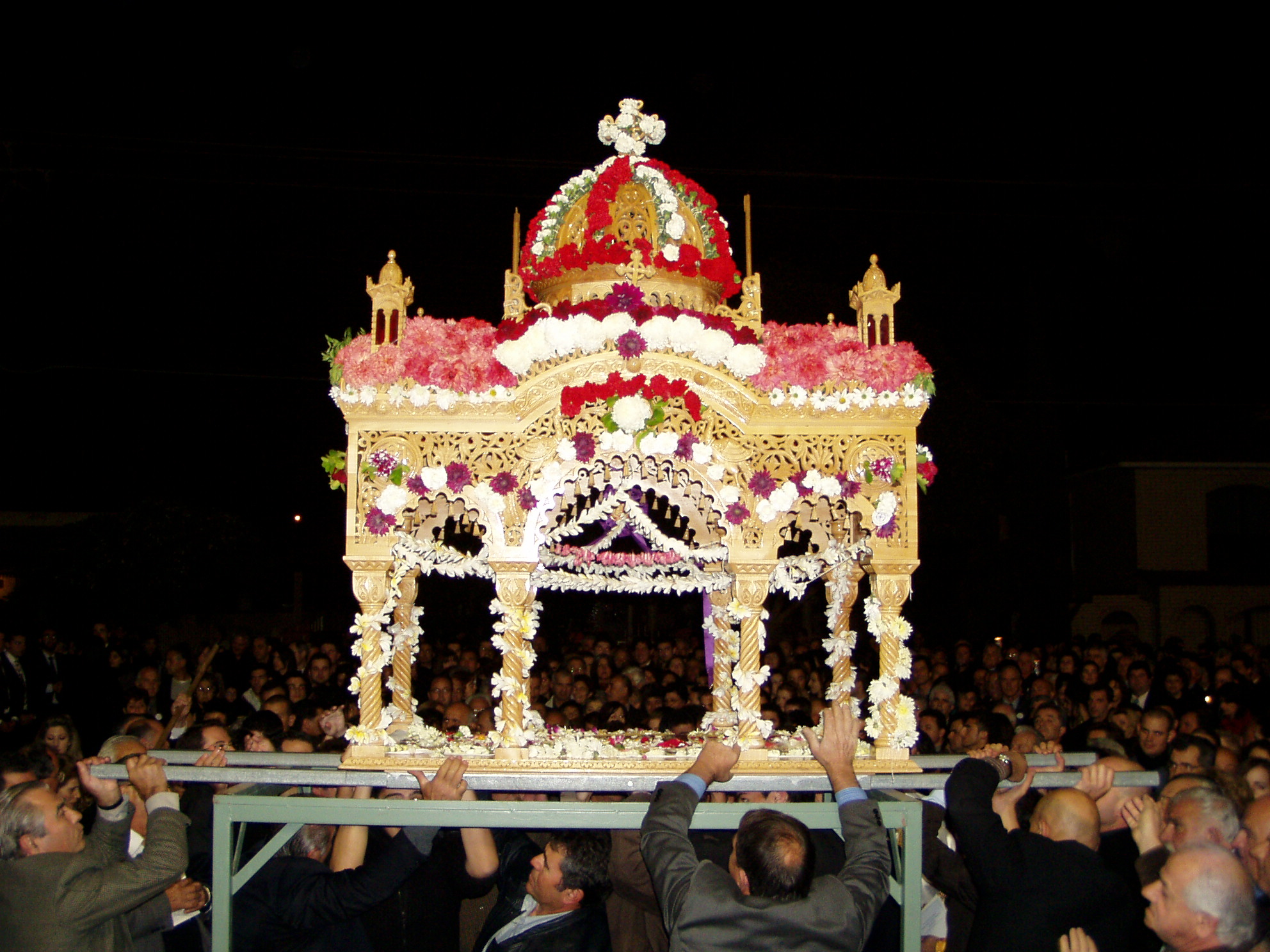
The Epitaph returned to the front on the Church, after the procession around the streets. (2006)

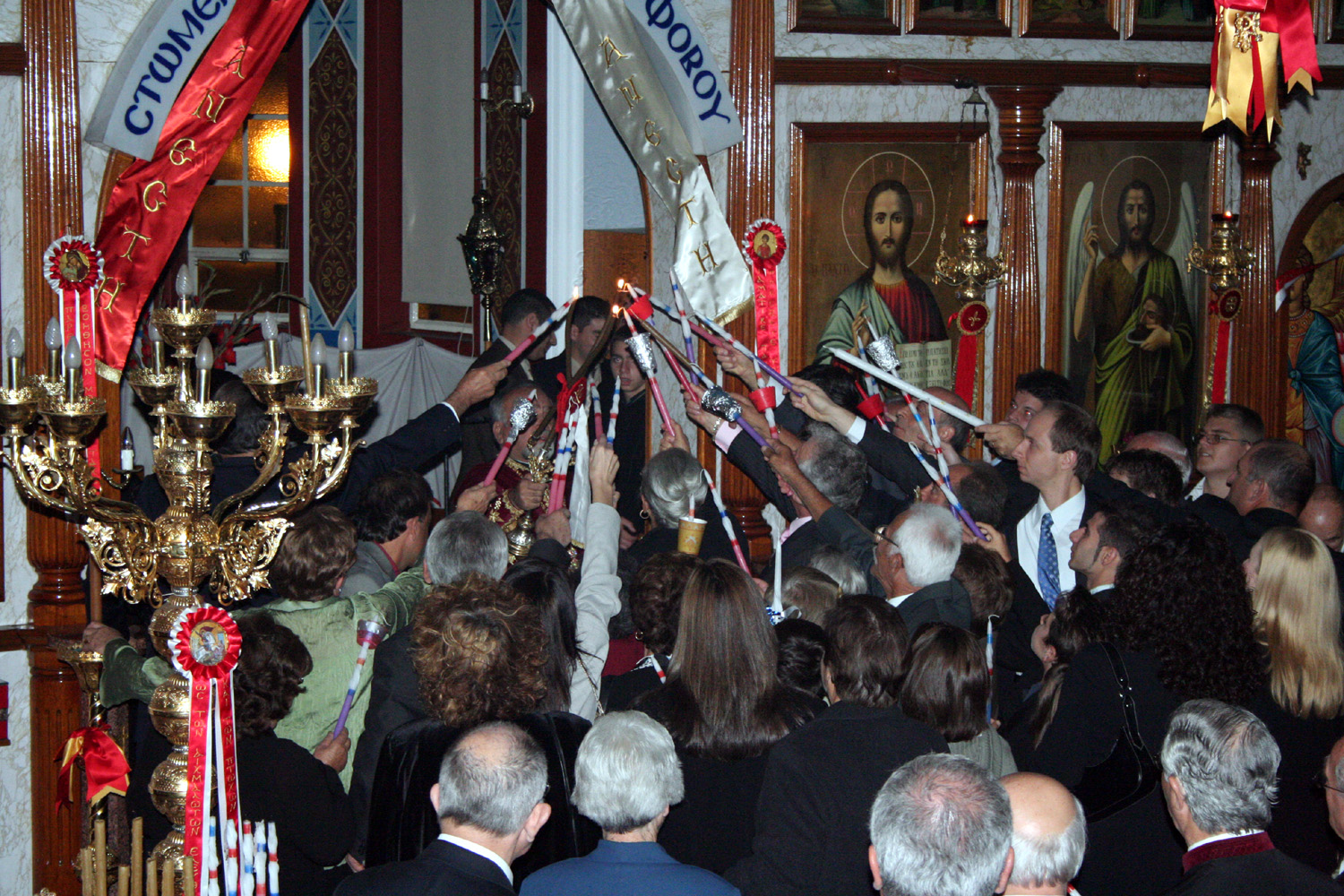
Easter 2007, minutes before midnight.

== Footnotes ==
34°55′19″S 138°34′20″E
