= Ernest H. Bayer =

Australian architect

Ernest Henry Bayer (21 March 1852 – 20 October 1908) was a South Australian architect, a founder of the South Australian Institute of Architects. His surname has also been spelled Beyer.

== History ==
Bayer was born in Adelaide, the third son of Dr Frederick Charles Bayer ( – 1867) and Grahame Eliza Bayer née Kent (c. 1831 – 4 April 1892). Doctor Bayer arrived in Australia from Germany aboard the Heloise in 1847. His widow, who was a daughter of Dr Benjamin Archer Kent (1808 – 25 November 1864) of Kent Town, married again, on 12 April 1881, to T. Reynolds of Caerphilly, Wales.

Bayer was sent to England for education, attending Hanwell College, Middlesex, then studied architecture, completing his articles with a London architect, one Saunders, and was elected an Associate of the Royal Institute of British Architects (RIBA).

He returned to Adelaide in 1873, and by July 1874 had set up a practice in Central Chambers, Waymouth Street.

In 1880 he went into partnership with Latham A. Withall, as Bayer & Withall, with offices in Insurance Chambers, Pirie Street, later Grenfell Chambers, Grenfell Street. The partnership dissolved late 1884, Bayer returned to a solo practice in Grenfell Chambers, and Withall took their head draftsman Alfred Wells into partnership as Withall & Wells, with offices in Register Chambers, Grenfell Street. Other notable associates were J. Quinton Bruce, Henry Ernest Fuller and Louis Laybourne Smith.

He was briefly associated with Rowland Rees in the restoration of the Adelaide Club on North Terrace.

== Other activities ==
- Bayer was a member of the Architectural Students' Association, and elected vice-president in September 1884.
- He was a member of the committee that founded the South Australian Institute of Architects, and was elected one of the first councillors.

== Selected works ==
(mostly while in partnership with Withnall)

- Christian Brothers College, Wakefield Street, Adelaide, (several wings 1878, 1880)
- Academy of Music, Rundle Street (1879)
- (perhaps) Cathedral Hotel, North Adelaide (1880)
- Estcourt House, Tennyson (1882)
- Pier Hotel, Largs Bay (1882)
- Grandstand at Victoria Park Racecourse (1882)
- "Forest Lodge", Aldgate (1890-1895) for John Bagot
- Ramsgate Hotel, Henley Beach (1897)

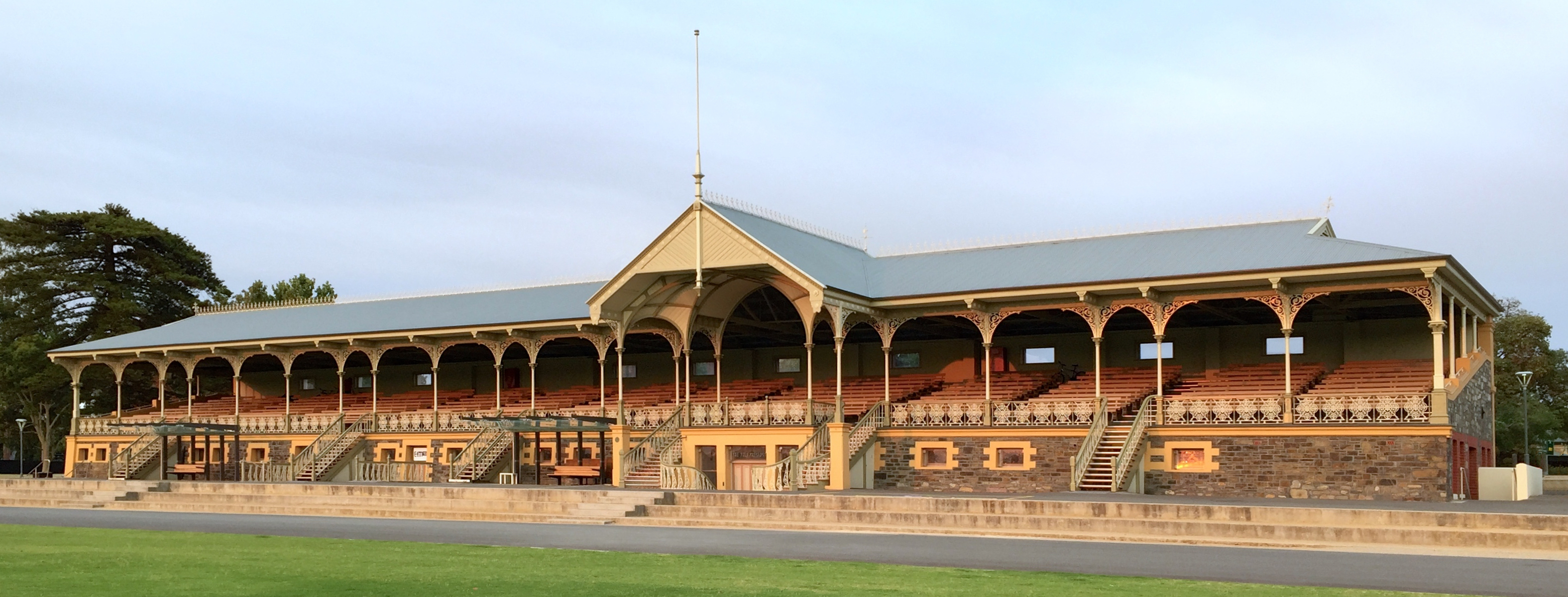

== Last days ==
Bayer suffered heart problems, which was the cause of his death at home in Glenelg. His remains were buried at the West Terrace Cemetery, Adelaide.

== Family ==
Bayer married Harriet(t?) D'Arbon "Sissie" Tolley (c. 1854 – 29 September 1919), eldest daughter of Albion James Tolley, on 11 March 1875. They had four daughters

- Evelyn Grahame Bayer (2 March 1876 – 1876)
- Emmeline Kent Bayer (17 March 1877 – ) married Arthur Bristowe on 18 January 1900
- Kathleen Lucie Bayer (13 May 1879 – ) married Wyndham Slaney Poole in 1915. Poole was a son of Frederic Slaney Poole.
- Fannie Gausden Bayer (13 July 1884 – ) married Frank Newton Lewis on 15 February 1912.
- Marjory Gladys Bayer (4 December 1888 – ) married Frank Meeten Bradshaw of Victoria on 3 June 1913.

and three sons

- Ernest Rupert Bayer (9 December 1881 – 1964) married Alvina Liebich in 1911
- Frederic Charles Bayer (7 February 1886 – 1967) married Gertrude Adelaide Menz on 10 September 1912, divorced 1934
- Charles Edward Bayer (1891 – 1944) married Kathleen Jane Rogers on 9 April 1921

They had a home on Brougham Place, North Adelaide, later on Smith Terrace, Glenelg.

C. A. Bayer, hydraulic engineer, was a brother.

His sister Lucy Gray Bayer married Sydney Constantine Tolley on 7 April 1881
