= S. T. C. Best =

Anglican priest in South Australia

Sydney Thomas Charles Best (7 November 1864 – 8 June 1949) was a long serving Anglican priest in South Australia.

== History ==
Best was born in Sydenham, England, the second son of George Frederick Best (1834–1906) and his wife Sophy Maria Best (1832 – 24 July 1908) who emigrated to South Australia aboard S.S. Cicero, arriving in Adelaide on 13 April 1883, and lived at Sydenham Cottage, Kent Town.

He was engaged in business for some years and closely involved with the (Anglican) St John's Church, Halifax Street, Adelaide. He was an active member of St John's Young Men's Society, Dramatic and Literary societies and superintendent of the Sunday school. He was appointed to several important lay positions before deciding on a full-time career in the Church. He enrolled with St Barnabas' College, North Adelaide to study for the ministry, graduated in 1900, was ordained deacon by Bishop Harmer in 1901 and priest in 1902.

Best served as assistant curate to Canon Andrews, at St Bartholomew's, Norwood from December 1901 to August 1903, and at St Mark's, Maylands from September 1902. He then served as rector at St Augustine's Church, Port Augusta from September 1903 to December 1906, then succeeded the Rev. C. E. Doudney at St George's Church and the Church of the Transfiguration in Gawler, then from 1911 to 1920 he served as rural dean in Gawler, and while there also served as chaplain to Roseworthy Agricultural College in 1912 and chaplain to the Australian Military Forces from 1916 to 1919. He left Gawler in 1925, to be replaced by the Rev. T. Percy Wood. Among the church's accomplishments during Best's incumbency may be numbered the completion of St George's church, Gawler South, the re-establishment of St Michael's Church, Barossa, and clearance of all church debts.

He was appointed rector of St Jude's Church, Brighton and All Saints', Seacliff in December 1925 and elected canon on 9 March 1934. He retired from parish work on 30 June 1936, but served from 1939 to 1946 as acting secretary of the Australian Board of Missions and from 1940 to 1944 at the North Adelaide Church of Christ.

== Other interests ==
- His involvement with the St John's Literary Society extended to membership of the South Australian Literary Societies' Union, of which he was in 1895 elected vice president and served as general secretary 1896–1901, and was credited with reviving the Union's moribund finances.
- He was appointed to the Aborigines' Protection Board in January 1940 and retired in January 1949.
- He played Lawn Bowls with the Gawler Bowling Club then the Brighton club.

== Family ==
Best married Alice Adelaide Uffindell (died 3 August 1935) in 1889

- Alice Muriel Best (1890-1981) married George Campbell McNeilage (1890–1967) in 1915
- (Sydney) Harold Thomas Best (1892–1969) married Grace Marguerite Brickwood Hocking (1896–1984) in 1916, lived in Western Australia.
- Stanley Arthur Best (1897–1982) married Dorette Kathleen Woodward ( –1932) in 1921, lived at Helmsdale.

He died at his home, Stanley Street Woodville Park, and his remains were buried in the churchyard at St Jude's, Brighton.
