= Fox and Anchor =

Pub in Farringdon, London

Coordinates: 51°31′13″N 0°06′02″W

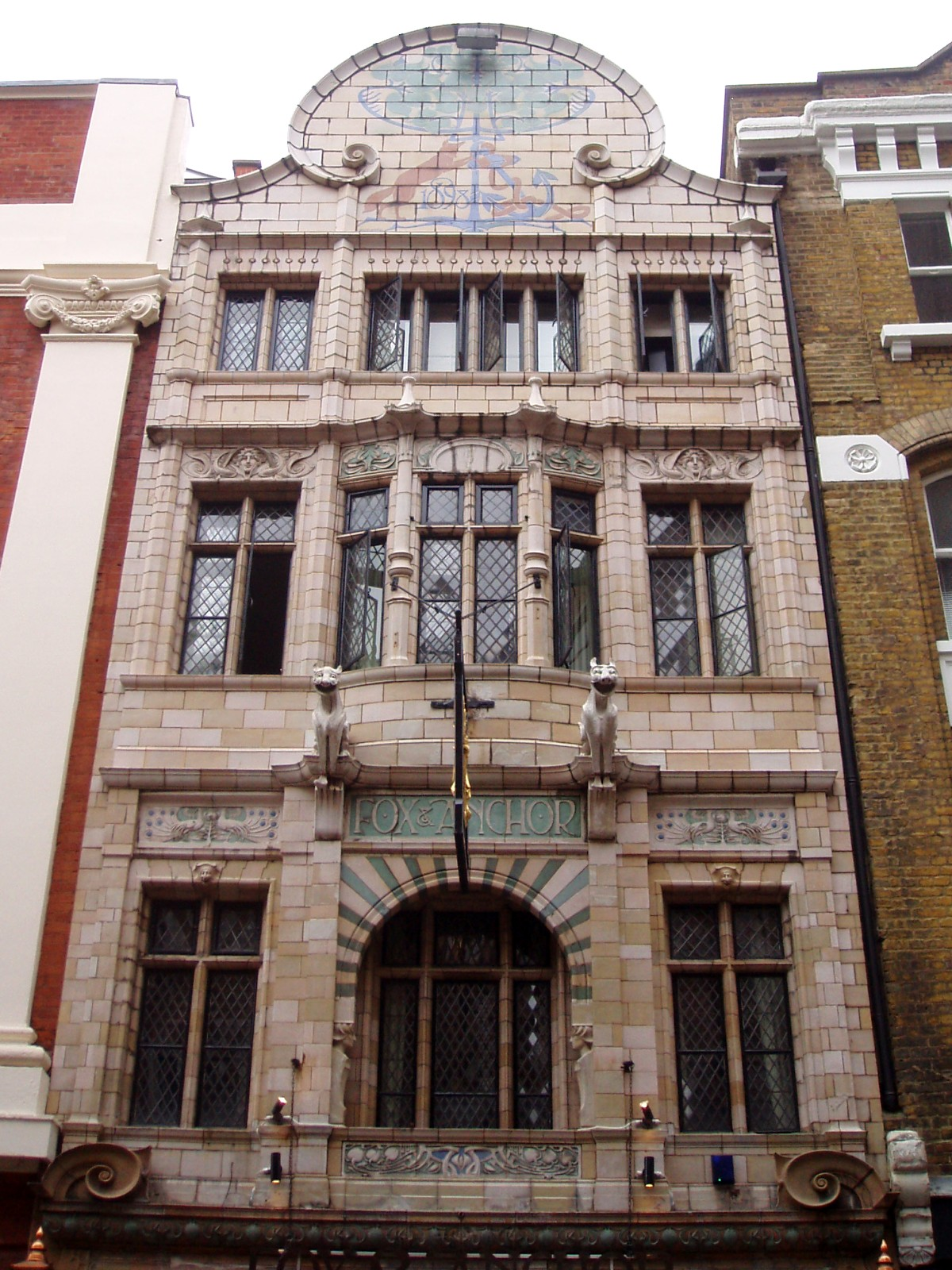
The Fox and Anchor

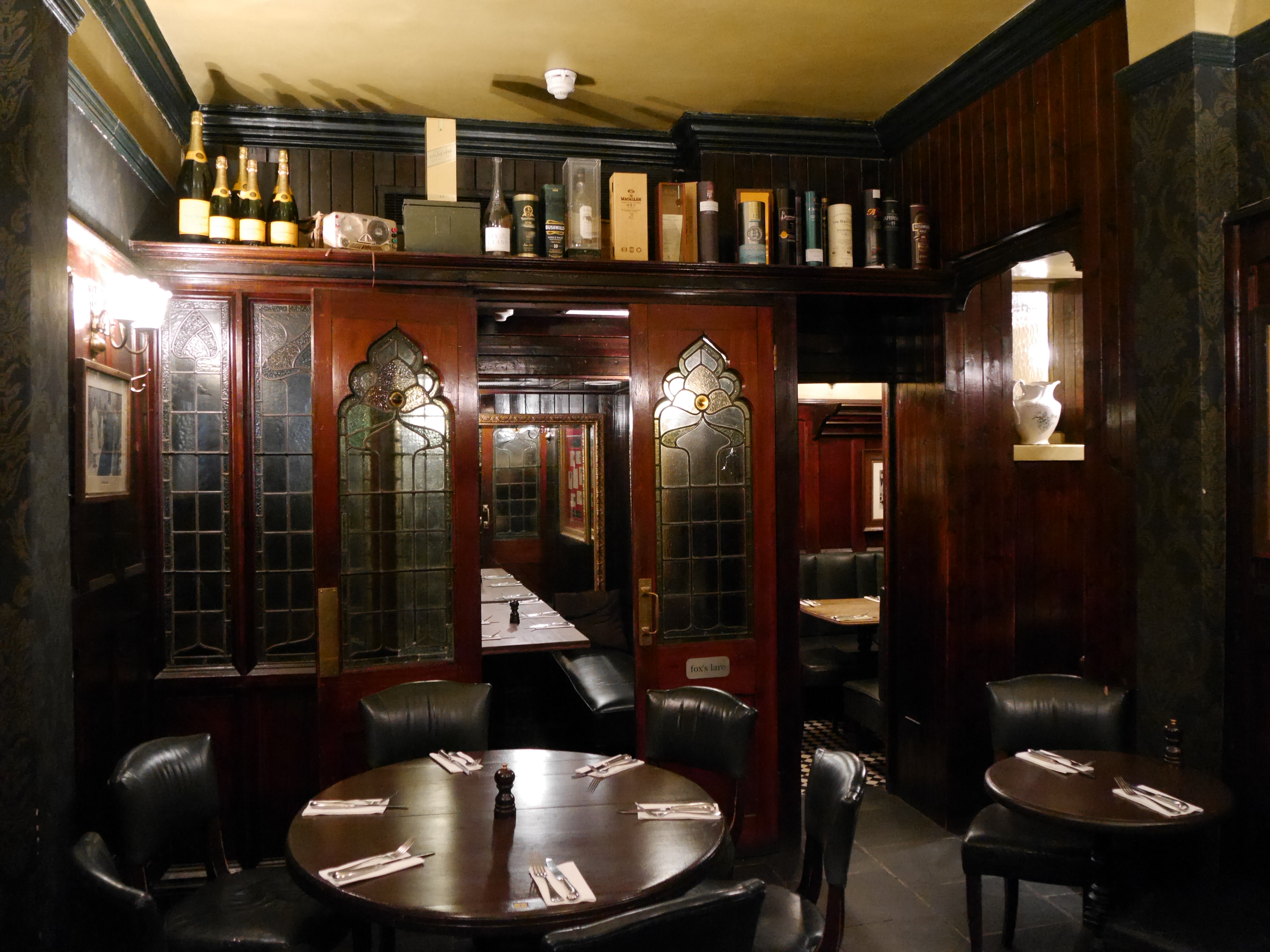
Interior

The Fox and Anchor is a Grade II listed public house at 115 Charterhouse Street, Farringdon, London.

It was designed by the architect Latham Withall and built in 1898 by W. H. Lascelles & Co. Architectural ceramics and sculpture by Royal Doulton, designed by W.J.Neatby in the Modern Style (British Art Nouveau style)
