= Frederic Slaney Poole =

Frederic Slaney Poole (9 July 1845 – 28 June 1936), generally referred to as F. Slaney Poole or Canon Poole, was an Anglican priest in South Australia.

== History ==
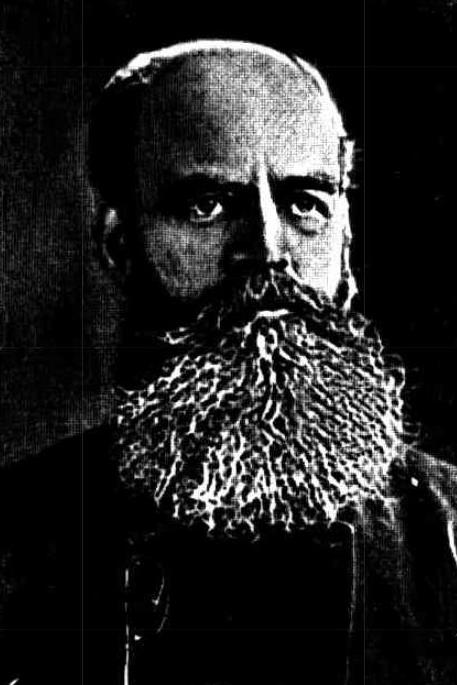
Canon F. Slaney Poole

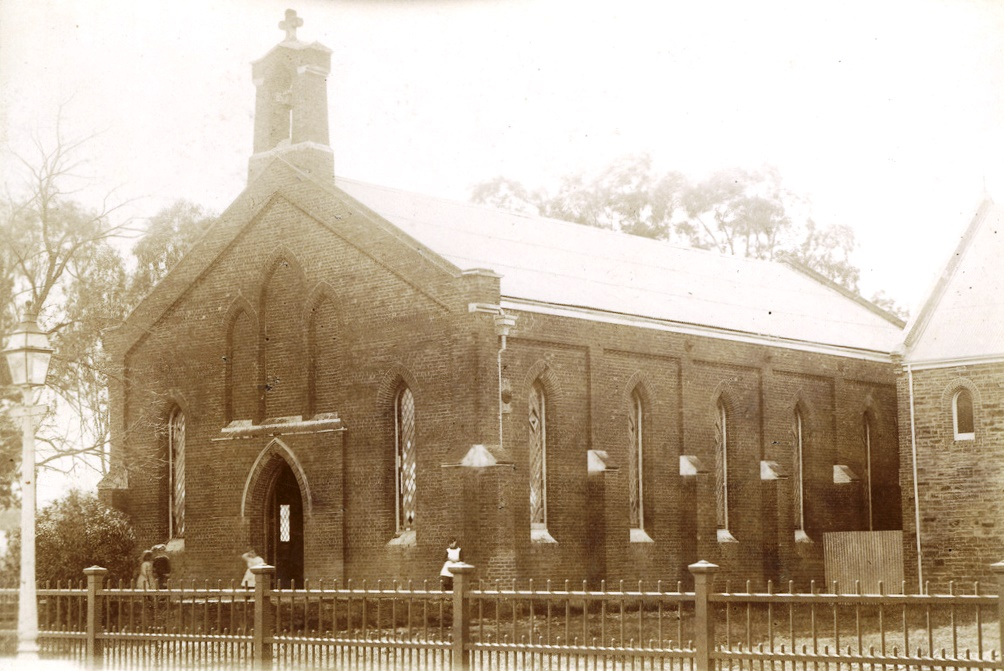
St John's church, Halifax Street c 1875

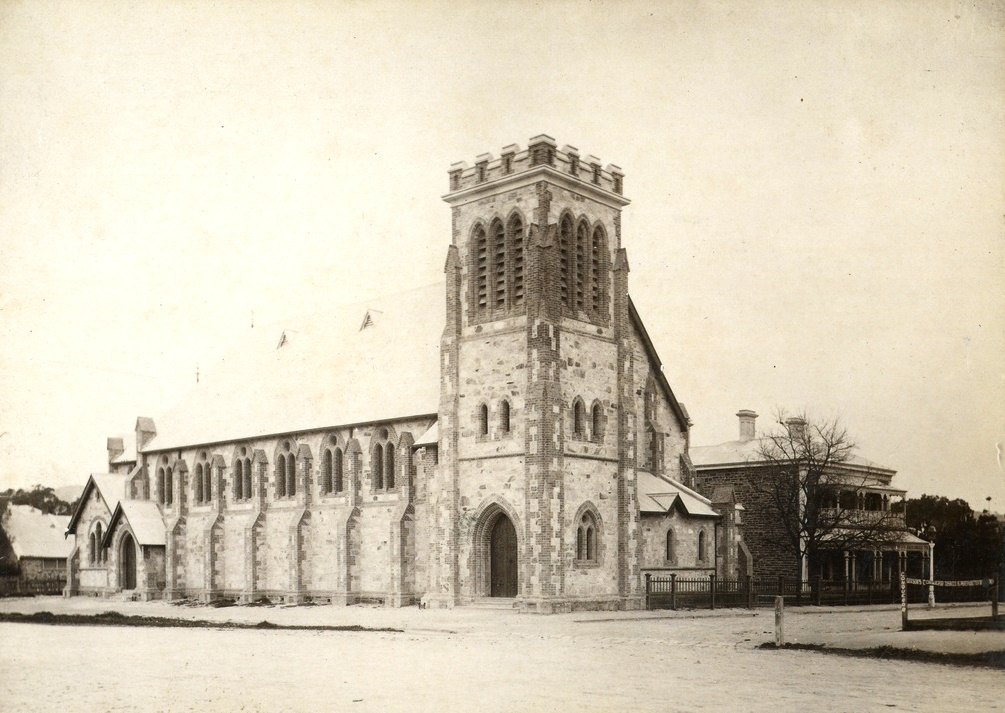
St John's church, Halifax Street c 1880. The two storey house next door is the Rectory.

Poole was born at Maidstone, Kent in 1845, the son of engraver Thomas Slaney and Elizabeth Martha. At age thirteen became a student at the Manchester Grammar School, followed by St John's College, Cambridge, where he took his degree in 1867.

When Bishop Augustus Short was visiting England in 1867, he engaged Poole as a master for St Peter's College, Adelaide, but on Poole's arrival in Adelaide aboard St Vincent in 1867, it was found that this post had been filled, so a position was found for him at Poonindie Mission where he could serve as catechist until he reached the age of 23 and could be canonized. In 1868 he was appointed curate to Archdeacon Thomas Nowell Twopeny, of Mount Gambier, stationed at Robe. The following year he was ordained priest, and remained at Robe till 1870, when he was appointed headmaster of Christ Church Grammar School, Mount Gambier. He left for England aboard St Vincent in February 1871, returning in December that year, He was appointed to Christ Church, Strathalbyn, from 1872 to 1874, when he was appointed Rector of St John's Church, Adelaide, at the eastern end of Halifax Street.

For the next twenty one years he was incumbent of St John's, which under his stewardship underwent a dramatic transformation. A fine new Church was built on Acres 581 and 582 in 1877, the parsonage rebuilt, new schoolrooms erected and St Mary Magdalene's Mission Church, on Halifax and Moore streets to the west of St John's, was built from material salvaged from the old church. The architect of the new church was R. Garlick Howell and the builder was William Rogers who also built the Jubilee Exhibition Building and Rymill House.

In 1895 he was transferred to Ballarat, Victoria, the training ground for Australian Bishops, as vicar of St Peter's Church in that city. He remained there for three years but increasing deafness made continued service there untenable. He returned to Adelaide, where he was appointed chaplain to Bishop Harmer in 1900, examining chaplain to Bishop Thomas in 1906, Canon of St Peter's Cathedral in 1907, and was elected a fellow of the Australian College of Theology in 1910.

== Education ==
- As a young graduate, Poole was a friend and mentor to Horace Lamb, and was instrumental in having him appointed, in 1875, the first Elder Professor of Mathematics at the University of Adelaide.
- Poole was a noted Classics scholar and served as senior Latin and Greek master at Adelaide Educational Institution in 1870.
- He was headmaster of Christ Church Grammar School at Mount Gambier in 1871–1872
- On the establishment of the University of Adelaide he was admitted ad eundem gradum.
- He was the Classical Lecturer at the University of Adelaide in 1873 and 1893
- He established a grammar school at St John's Church in January 1890, originally for the benefit of the choirboys, but quickly developed.
- He served as examiner, and a member of the University Council for six years.

== Family ==
Frederic Slaney Poole (9 July 1845 – 28 June 1936) married Rebecca Scott (c. 1843 – 10 May 1931) in England on 26 August 1870, shortly before returning to Adelaide. Their family included:

- Thomas Slaney Poole "Justice Poole" (3 July 1873 – 2 May 1927)
- Kate Mary Poole (1874 – 7 July 1951) married Edgar Sabine (1873– ) in 1906, lived in Prospect. Edgar was a nephew of Clement Sabine.
- Beatrice Alice Poole (1879–) married Hugh Selby Covernton in 1906, lived at Semaphore
- Dr. Frederic St. John Poole (1881–1952) married Joyce Elizabeth Longbottom in 1914, lived in Alberton
- Dorothy Landon Poole (1882– ), lived in Bathurst, New South Wales
- Marjory Vera Poole (1884–) married Allan Holford Wettenhall in 1906, lived in Mount Martha, Victoria
- Lieut. Wyndham Slaney Poole (c. 1886 – 15 October 1946) married Kathleen Lucie Bayer in 1915, lived in Edwardstown. Bayer was a daughter of architect Ernest H. Bayer.
- Norah Poole ( – ) lived in Prospect

He died at home after a short illness; his remains were buried at the North Road Cemetery.

Rev. H. J. Poole A.M. (Oxon), Dean of Adelaide in 1870, was not closely related, though Poole did have an older brother, a sailor aboard City of Adelaide who became an Anglican clergyman, serving in Fiji and Lismore, Grenfell, and Brewarrina.

== Other interests ==
- Poole was a keen cricketer, and vice-president of the Strathalbyn Cricket Club in 1872
- He was President of St John's Literary Society (founded 1882).
- He was an active Freemason and held responsible positions in several Lodges in Adelaide. He was chaplain to the United Tradesmen's Lodge.

== See also ==
P. A. Howell (1988). "Poole, Frederic Slaney (1845–1936)". Australian Dictionary of Biography, National Centre of Biography, Australian National University.
