= Charterhouse Street =

Street in Smithfield, London

Coordinates: 51°31′08.76″N 0°06′13.02″W

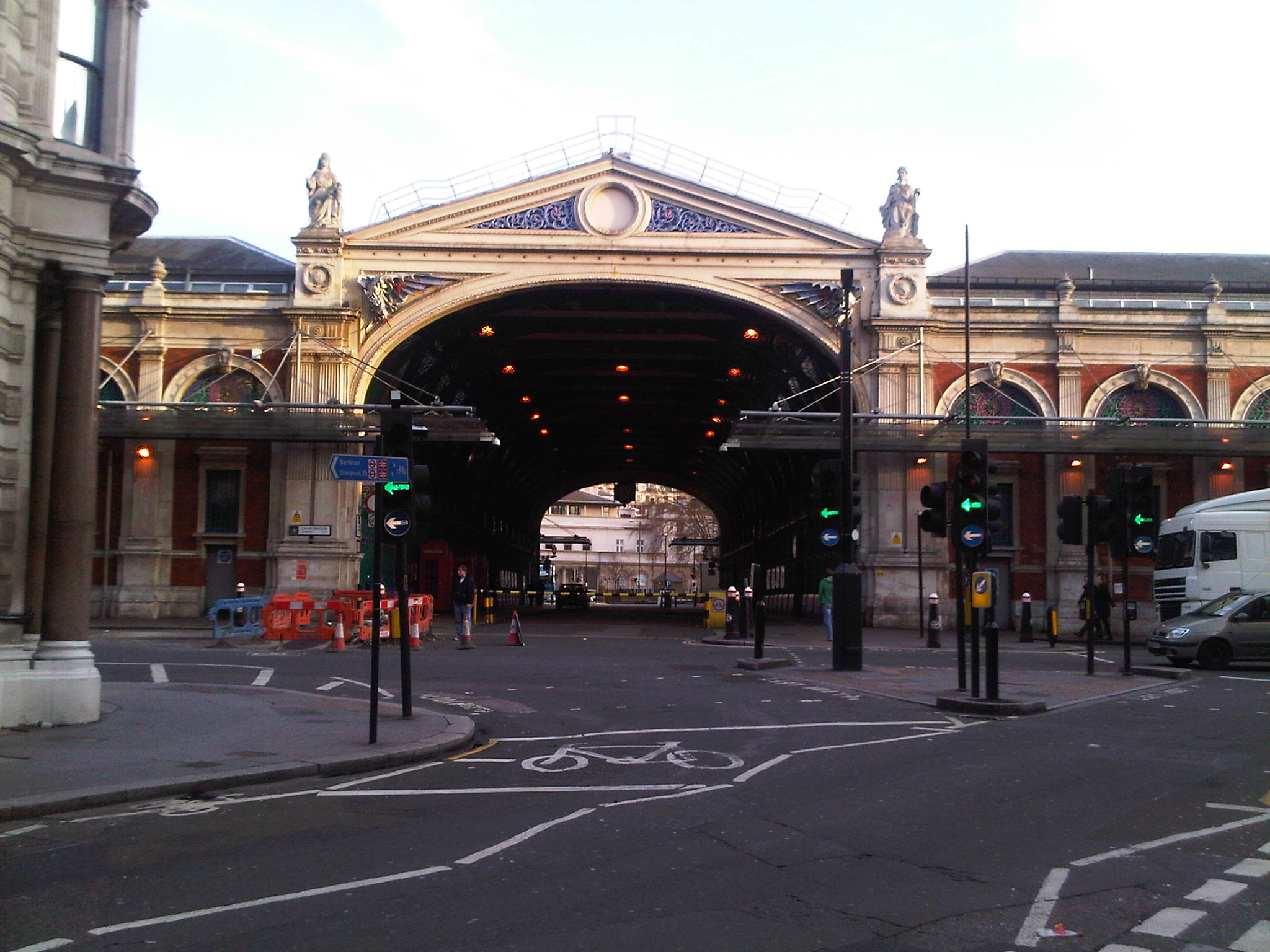
Smithfield Market from Charterhouse Street

Charterhouse Street is a street on the north side of Smithfield in the City of London. The road forms part of the City’s boundary with the neighbouring London Boroughs of Islington and Camden. It connects Charterhouse Square and Holborn Circus, crossing Farringdon Road and running along a number of historical sites, including Smithfield Market.

The nearest London Underground stations are Barbican near the east end of Charterhouse Street and Farringdon further west. Farringdon station also provides a connection to Crossrail and Thameslink rail services.

== Notable buildings ==
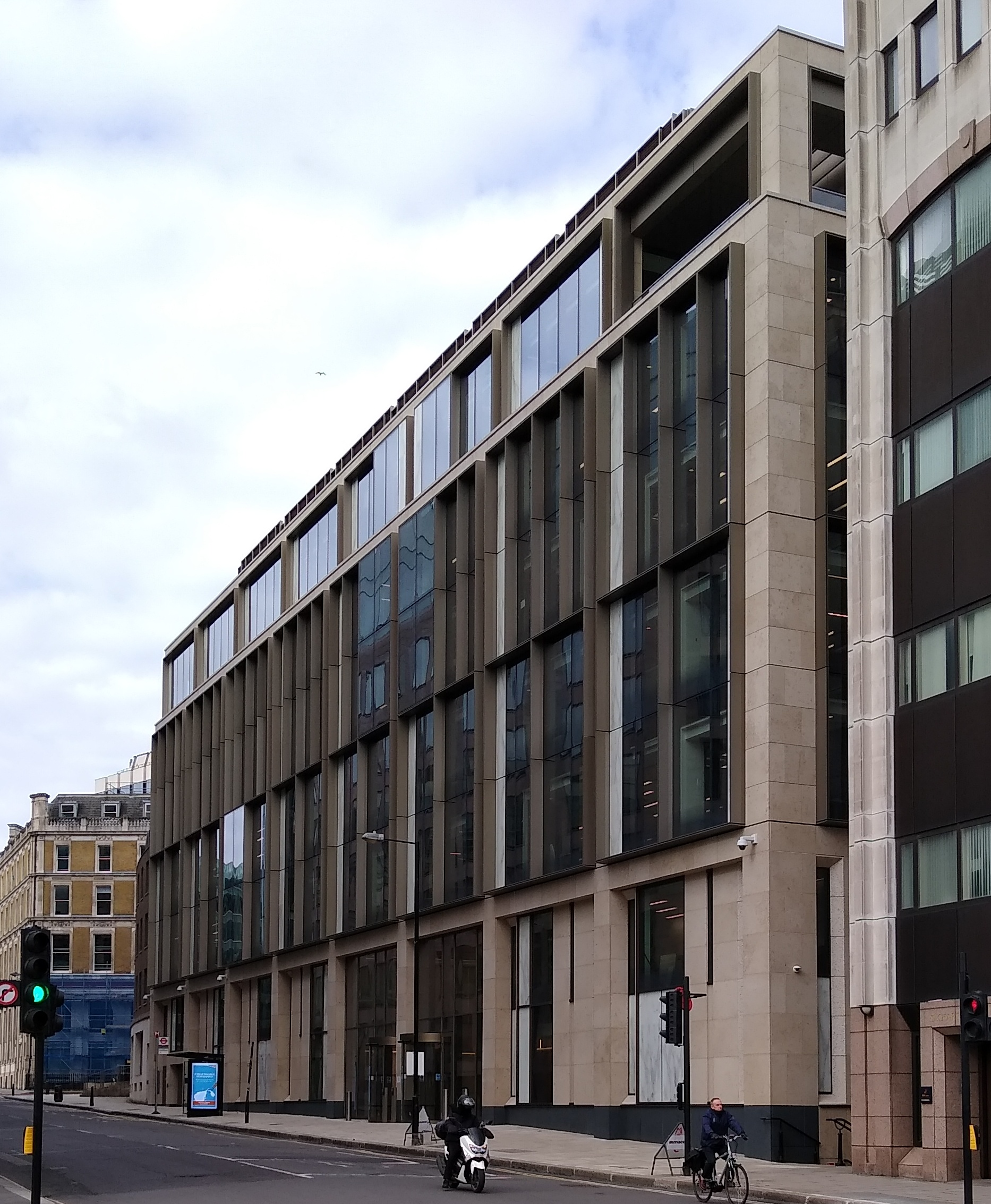
17 Charterhouse Street in 2021

=== Current ===
Several gastropubs line the street, including the Fox and Anchor. The formerly-DJ Mag #1 club Fabric nightclub is located at No. 77A.

Charterhouse Street is also the home of a 31 MWe combined heat and power plant operated by Citigen (E.ON) and located within and beneath the former PLA cold store.

Anglia Ruskin University has a campus in Charterhouse Street 19.

==== De Beers ====
International diamond corporation De Beers has been headquartered at No. 17 since 1979, except between 2017-2020, though the street has homed De Beers since the 1930s. According to Bloomberg News, at the height of its power, over ninety per cent of the world's rough diamonds were held in the building, and by 2016, it housed over US$5 billion (£3.89 billion, equivalent to £5.19 billion in 2025) worth of gems in its underground vaults. After moving to Carlton House Terrace in 2017, plans to sell the building were proposed. The building was leased back on a long-term deal, with the intention that both De Beers and its parent company, Anglo American plc, would move into the building by 2020. Following renovations by London architecture and design firm MCM, Anglo made No. 17 its global headquarters in 2021.

==== Smithfield Market ====
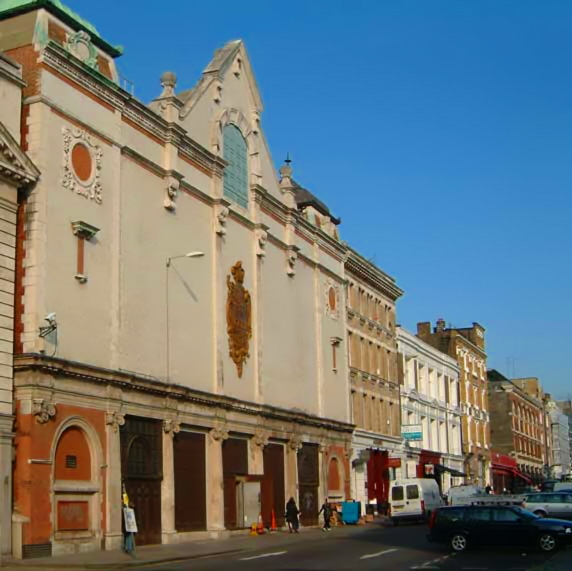
The former Central Cold Store on Charterhouse Street

The 19th century Grade II listed Smithfield Market, designed by Victorian architect Sir Horace Jones, is the dominant architectural feature of the area. The market, along with Billingsgate Fish Market and New Spitalfields Market are expected to move to a new consolidated site in Dagenham Dock. The Museum of London plans to move into the General Market Building on Smithfield when possible, vacating its nearby Barbican site in December 2022.

=== Previous tenants ===
The street was formerly home to several refrigerated warehouses serving Smithfield Meat Market including the Central Cold Store, the Metropolitan Cold Stores at 77A and Port of London Authority Cold Store. The site on the corner of Farringdon Road was occupied by the 1960s Caxton House which was demolished in 2009 as part of the Farringdon station extension.
