= John Dempster (organist) =

Australian organist (1885–1942)

Reginald Robert John Dempster (30 August 1885 – 13 May 1942) was a church organist and choirmaster in South Australia.

== History ==
Dempster was the elder son of Rev. Robert William George Dempster (6 January 1865 – 3 September 1931) and his wife Lydia May Dempster, née Ward, (1868 - 11 July 1946) who married in London on 30 January 1883 and shortly afterward left for South Australia.

John Dempster was born at Montacute, South Australia and educated at St. Peter's College. He began his musical career as a chorister at St. Peter's Cathedral at the age of eight. He won a choir scholarship at the college, and also received piano and organ lessons from W. M. "Billy" Hole, the college chapel's organist and choirmaster who died 25 April 1935. He further studied organ playing under Arthur H. Otto at St Peter's Cathedral.

He was organist and choirmaster of St Matthew's Church, Kensington, then in October 1909 succeeded A. H. Otto at St John's Church, Adelaide, and served there to 1924.

Dempster succeeded W. R. Knox as City Organist in 1928. This appointment was attended by controversy, as Dempster was appointed without any competitive evaluation, and eminent musicians John Horner, Frederic Finlay and W. Lawrence Haggitt, who had all applied, signed a public letter airing their sense of injustice, and implying he was a poor choice. The fact that Dempster would receive a salary where previously it was an honorary position, made the choice additionally problematic.

He conducted the Adelaide Women's Choir from its foundation in 1934 to November 1936 or perhaps later.

He was in March 1937 foundation conductor of the Adelaide Philharmonic Choir, supported by the Australian Broadcasting Commission radio station 5CL and gave its first public concert in October 1937. and remained actively connected until shortly before his death, when it was taken over by Norman Chinner.

He wrote many articles on the Adelaide music scene for the newspapers, and for the last seven years of his life was music critic for The Sunday Mail.

He was appointed choirmaster and organist at Flinders Street Baptist Church in May 1938, where he served until early in 1942, when forced by ill health to retire. He died three months later, and his remains were interred at the North Road Cemetery.

== Family ==
(Reginald Robert) John Dempster married Hilda Lane (c. 1885 – 13 February 1948) on 7 July 1914. They had two daughters:

- Christobel Dempster (25 June 1818 – c. 2008) married Arthur Franklin ( – ) at St Matthew's Church, Marryatville, on 20 December 1941.
- Greta Ellman Dempster (17 September 1923 – 6 June 1999) married Ference "Frank" Frolich (c. 1915 - 15 January 1985) on 12 July 1947

They had a home at 54 Hutt Street, Adelaide. William Robert Dempster (6 July 1887 – 29 January 1956) of Tanunda was a brother.
