= Reginald Dawson Hopcraft Lough =

Royal Marines officer

Lieutenant-General Reginald Dawson Hopcraft Lough DSO OBE
- Born: 5 August 1885; Halifax, Nova Scotia
- Died: 22 March 1958 (aged 72); Deal, Kent
- Military career
- Allegiance: United Kingdom
- Branch: Royal Marines
- Service years: 1903–1941
- Rank: Lieutenant-General
- Conflicts: First World War; Second World War
- Awards: Distinguished Service Order; Officer of the Order of the British Empire; Mentioned in Despatches (5); Croix de guerre (France)

Lieutenant-General Reginald Dawson Hopcraft Lough, DSO, OBE (5 August 1885 – 22 March 1958) was a Royal Marines officer who served as the Commander of the Royal Marine Depot, Deal. He was made aide-de-camp to King George VI.

== Early life ==
Reginald Dawson Hopcraft Lough was born on 5 August 1885 in Halifax, Nova Scotia. He was the son of William J. Lough, a retired Army chaplain, and Jane M. Lough. He was educated at Bedford Modern School.

== Career ==
Lough joined the Royal Marine Light Infantry as a second lieutenant on 1 January 1903. During the First World War he was mentioned in despatches five times, was awarded the Distinguished Service Order, appointed an Officer of the Order of the British Empire and decorated with the Croix de Guerre with palm. He was promoted to lieutenant colonel in 1933 and colonel in 1936. He became commander of the Royal Marine Depot, Deal in 1937. He was appointed Royal Marine ADC to King George VI (1938–39) and promoted to major general in 1939 and to lieutenant general in 1940. He retired in 1941.

Lough died in Deal, Kent on 22 March 1958.
