= South Australian Hotel =

Hotel in Adelaide, South Australia

The South Australian Hotel was a building at 147–150 North Terrace, Adelaide opposite the railway station and Parliament House. (Note: Adjacent buildings in 1960 were the Queensland Govt Tourist Bureau at 157 and the Gresham Hotel at 159 at the King William Street corner. On the western side was Anchor House at 142, which building incorporated offices of Ansett–ANA, Wood & Son, Thomas Cook & Son and several others.) The hotel, which had a reputation for conservative values, service and civility, was demolished in 1971.

== History ==
The Bank of South Australia had its first permanent head office on North Terrace, opened in 1857. It soon proved to be profitable, but quickly outgrew those premises, and in 1875 preparations were began by manager W. G. Cuthbertson for an even more impressive building on King William Street, designed by Edmund W. Wright and Lloyd Tayler, built by the firm of Brown and Thompson. The massive safes and fire doors were manufactured locally by A. Simpson & Son and the bank opened for business on 21 June 1878.

In 1878 Henry James Trew (c. 1837 – 4 April 1910), a well-known "sporting personality" and licensee of the Globe Hotel, Rundle Street, from 1872, took a lease on the old bank, which in 1879 opened as Trew's South Australian Club Hotel. No expense had been spared in making it equal in "palatial splendour [to those of] San Francisco or New York". It had 47 bedrooms, mostly arranged on three corridors which ran the length of the old bank chambers, and a few on the upper floor. 20 were equipped with gas lighting. There were "numerous bathrooms, supplied with hot and cold water", and sitting rooms, or drawing rooms, at the front of the hotel with French windows leading to a balcony overlooking North Terrace. The principle entrance was on North Terrace, with another exit to Gresham Street and a right of way to the Theatre Royal, which also served as a convenient access to Hindley Street, in those days the city's main shopping strip. Trew was granted a liquor licence in May 1879.

The lease passed to George Flecker and, no doubt hastened by Trew's insolvency, its name morphed into South Australian Club Hotel. Flecker, who died in 1909, converted the lease to freehold around 1892. and instituted a major program of upgrades, planned and supervised by architect Alfred Wells; the hotel was officially re-opened on 1 September 1894. It slowly became the South Australian Hotel, by which name it was known (or remembered) for the next hundred years.

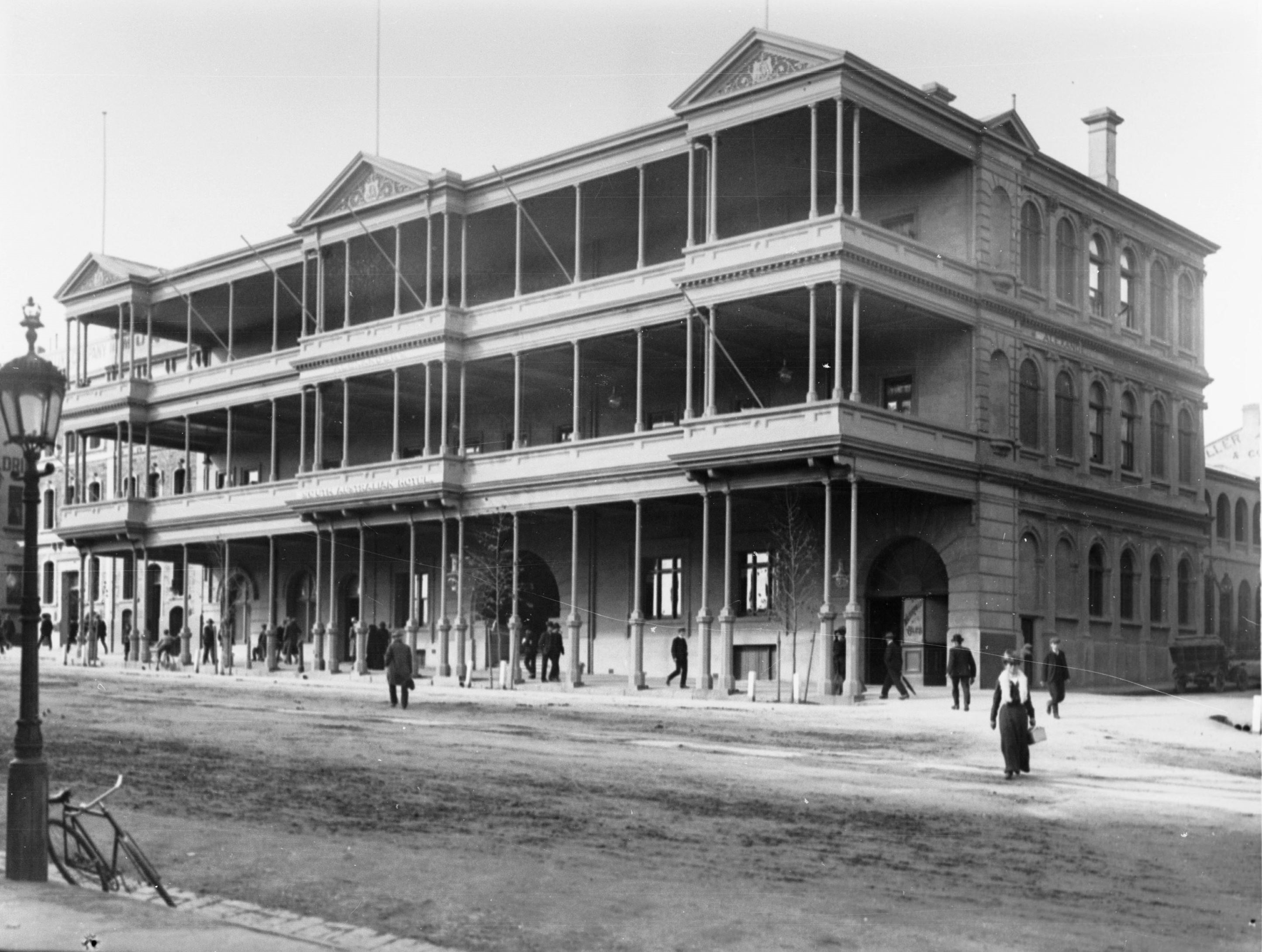
The South Australian Hotel, c. 1900

It was largely rebuilt in 1899 to three storeys, then in 1909 extended out the back and updated, under architect J. Q. Bruce. (Note: John Quinton Bruce (c. 1845 – 1930), of the firm of Bruce and Harral, was one of Adelaide's oldest architects and a vice president of the S.A. Institute of Architects in 1921 and 1922.) Improvements included a new dining room, lit by electricity.

In 1933 its contents were gutted to make way for modern furniture and fittings.

== Patronage ==
In its heyday "The South", as it was familiarly known, was the address of choice in Adelaide for wealthy pastoralists; one major reason was its proximity to the railway station. Country visitors might stay for a week or more while transacting business, but with the advent of reliable motor vehicles, stays were often much shorter.

Visiting artists such as Robert Helpmann, and Bernard Heinze were generally booked into "The South", as were visiting cricket teams ("always the headquarters of visiting cricketers"). Conventional dress code was observed: as recently as 1953, a world-famous violinist was refused service in the lounge through not wearing a tie. Famous guests include Anna Pavlova, H. G. Wells, Sir Laurence Olivier and his wife Vivien Leigh, Noel Coward, and Katharine Hepburn. One celebrated set of guests was The Beatles in 1964.

Country visitors to the Royal Show often preferred to stay there, as did visiting politicians.

The hotel also hosted business functions such as the 1929 British cars expo.

== Last days ==
In 1971 the hotel was demolished to make way for the Stamford Plaza Hotel. A brass plaque on that building bears the inscription:

The South Australian Hotel was erected on this site in 1894 and until 1971 was an intrinsic part of the cultural life of the City of Adelaide.
