= St John's Church, Adelaide =

St. John's is an Anglican church at the south-east corner of the City of Adelaide dating from 1841. The first building was demolished in 1886 and its replacement opened in 1887.

== The first church ==
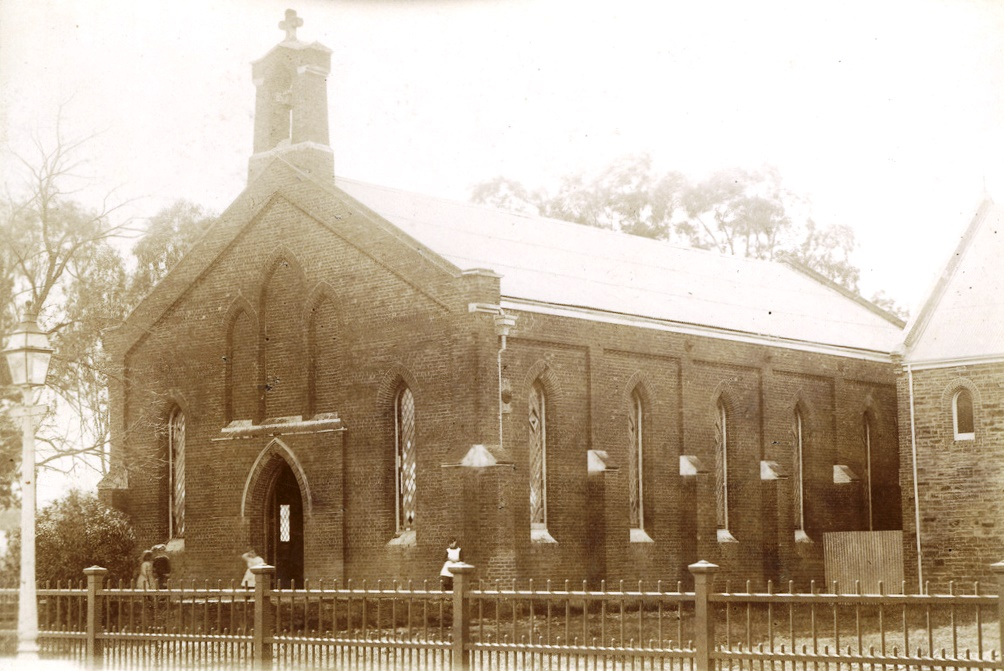
St John's, Halifax Street c. 1875

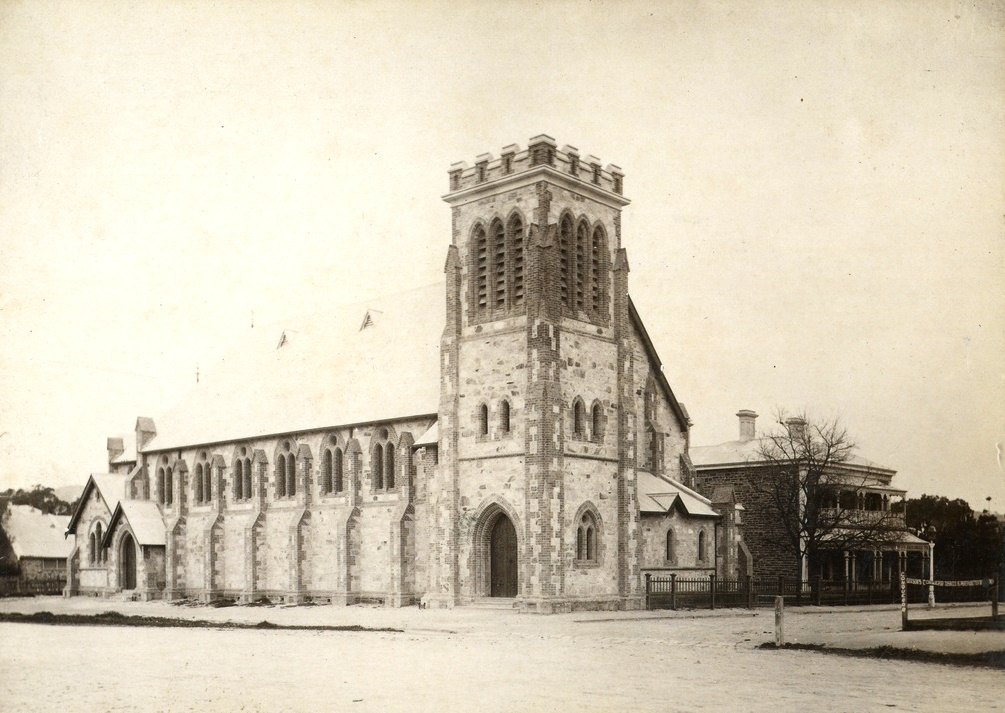
St John's, Halifax Street c. 1890. The two storey house next door is the Rectory.

1 St John's
2 St Paul's
3 St Mary Magdalene's

In 1840 the first Anglican church building, Trinity Church, was erected on North Terrace, Adelaide, but soon demands arose for a second place of worship to cater for members in and around Unley and the foothills, and to that end Osmond Gilles donated to the Church Building Society of South Australia half an acre of his section 581 on Halifax Street near the corner of East Terrace and South Terrace. The location could not have been much further from Trinity Church without leaving the city square, and between the two was little more than rough scrub and tracks that became a quagmire in winter. For many years after its establishment it was known colloquially as "St John's in the Wilderness".

On 19 October 1839 the foundation stone was laid by Governor Gawler The foundations had been laid using £540 that had been collected in Adelaide, then for over a year little progress was made due to a shortage of funds. Generous friends in England raised some more and the church, which seated around 300, was erected for around £2,100. The first service was held on 24 October 1841, conducted by the Reverend James Farrell and the Colonial Chaplain Charles Beaumont Howard. The parsonage was a Manning prefabricated cottage brought out by Gilles as his first residence, dubbed "Hexagon Cottage", which sported a brass door-knocker.

Farrell inherited the title of Colonial Chaplain, meaning he had to take over Trinity Church and in December 1843 closed the doors of St John's for services, weddings and baptisms excepted, until a replacement could be found. That man was the Reverend William Woodstock, who came out on the barque Emu with the Rev. James Pollitt (both reputed Puseyites), and took his first service at St John's on 17 May 1846.

In 1848 an organ, built by Samuel Marshall, was installed.

In May 1849 Woodcock transferred to the newly completed Christ Church, North Adelaide and Matthew Hale, Archdeacon of Adelaide, took over St John's. Hale was followed by a succession of priests, none of whom succeeded in generating much interest, and only one (the Reverend Denzil Ibbetson) stayed for any length of time. The church was lit by gas in 1869.

== The second church ==
The Rev. F. Slaney Poole was elected in June 1874 and inducted on 4 September. The parish hall was built by John Wark in 1880 to a design of Daniel Garlick; St John's Grammar School opened there and, with additional classrooms, operated until 1942. Poole was also responsible for building the parsonage in 1884 and replacing the original church building, which had been declared unsafe by the City Surveyor. The adjoining block 582 was purchased and the old building demolished in November 1886. The foundation stone of the new building was laid by Bishop Kennion on 14 May 1887 and the structure erected by Walter Rogers to a design by R. G. Holwell at a cost of £3,000. Kennion consecrated the completed church on 6 October 1887 and the first services were held on 9 October 1887. A mission church, St Mary Magdalene's, was built on nearby Moore Street (between Angas and Carrington streets) using material recovered from the old building and opened in 1887.

Canon Poole resigned in 1895, and Canon W. S. Hopcraft, from Port Augusta, was appointed in his place. He found the church's finances in a precarious state, with an annual income barely £500, and the church debt of nearly £2,000. During his thirteen years of rectorship he managed to double the church's income and reduce the church debt by nearly £1,000, while spending nearly £2,000 on improvements, notably an organ by Josiah Dodd, which cost £800. It was renovated in 1996 by George Stephens and is highly regarded by enthusiasts.

== Society of the Sacred Mission ==
In 1978, the then Rector, the Rev Don Wallace, was approached by the Australian Provincial of the Society of the Sacred Mission with the proposal that the Society take over the parish on Wallace's retirement. The Society had a theological college and priory house in Crafers, St Michael's House, but it moved the students to St John's in the years before 1983, when St Michael's House was destroyed by the Ash Wednesday bushfires.

== Incumbents ==
- James Farrell, 1841-43. Farrell initiated "A Chapel of Ease to St. John's" prior to the erection of the first church building.
- Church closed 31 December 1843 – June 1846. No services were held, and see T. P. Wilson below.
- William Woodstock, 1846-49.
- Matthew Hale, 1849–50 (transferred to Port Lincoln).
- John Whitelaw Schoales conducted marriages in October and November 1850, and perhaps took Sunday services, and was then appointed to St Mary's on the Sturt.
- Theodore Wilson was expected to leave Tasmania to take over St. John's in May 1845, but cancelled due to his wife's indisposition. He was appointed first principal of St Peter's College (at that time located behind Trinity Church) in January 1848. He resigned in 1851 after a disagreement with the governors and became incumbent of St. John's sometime before September 1851. He resigned in November 1852 and returned to England, where he had a living near Shrewsbury.
- Edmund Jenkins, 1851-53.
- John Bagshaw, 1852-55. Bagshaw resigned on grounds of ill-health but in April 1856 accepted the position of principal of the newly opened Nelson College, Nelson, New Zealand.
- Alexander Russell (1825 – 20 May 1886), 1855-59. Russell was appointed from St. Andrew's Church, Walkerville. After leaving St John's, he founded St Paul's, Pulteney Street, in 1860, and succeeded James Farrell as Dean of Adelaide.
- J. Stuart Jackson, 1860. Jackson resigned soon after his appointment to take over St Peter's Church, Glenelg.
- Mr, later the Reverend Henry Howitt (died 1 May 1922), 1860–61
- Denzil Ibbetson (1823 – 10 August 1871), 1861-71. Ibbetson was appointed from Burra. In 1871 he retired due to his final illness.
- T. Jasper Smyth, 1871-73. Smyth was previously at Christ Church, Kapunda. He resigned from St John's in 1873, when he returned to Ireland on receiving news of the death of his father. He had been granted a year's leave but never returned to Australia.
- Frederic Slaney Poole, 1874-95. Poole resigned on 29 May 1895 to take St. Peter's Church, Ballarat.
- William Samuel Hopcraft (c. 1848 – 9 June 1908), 1895-1908. Hopcraft appointed Arthur Otto to reorganise the choir along traditional cathedral lines.
- Rupert Hewgill, 1908-18.
- Horace Finnis, 1918-27. Finnis resigned in 1927 when he was appointed precentor of St. Peter's Cathedral
- Egerton Augustine North Ash (29 August 1888 – 1 June 1954), 1927-35. North Ash resigned in 1935 to take St John's Church, Tamworth.
- Eric Wyllie (1888–1972), 1935-45. Wylie was subsequently the incumbent of St John's Church, Coromandel Valley
- E.J. Cooper, 1945-64.
- Don Wallace, 1964–78. He and his wife Gwen were adoptive parents of Harold Thomas, the designer of the Aboriginal flag.
- Douglas Brown SSM, 1978–82
- Dunstan McKee SSM, 1982–?
- Christopher Myers SSM, 1990–?
- --
- Peter Balabanski

== Organists ==
- G. T. Light (1820–1896) was organist at St John's in 1852 at least. Also an architect, he was for a time the partner of R. G. Holwell, who designed the present church.
- Mrs. Alfred Nash, 1853
- H. H. Thomas, 1854
- Henry Rothwell Pounsett (died August 1891) organist 1854–1856 and founded the choir.
- Mr. ? Hill 1860
- Henry Pounsett (aka H. Pounsett junr.; died November 1890), 1861–1865 or later, during the incumbencies of Russell and Ibbetson He was member of Adelaide Choral Society under Carl Linger and founder of the Original Adelaide Christy Minstrels.
- James William Heberlet (died June 1910) 1873–1874
- ". . . he was followed by Mr. Richardson, Mr. Landergan, Mrs. Newman, Miss Playford, and Mr. Jeffery Bruer."
- Charles May Gribble (died July 1908), served 1890–1897; left St John's for Trinity Church. He was pianist for the Adelaide Orpheus Society.
- Jeffrey James Bruer (died 12 November 1936), organist at St John's 1897–1902. Daughter Gladys Bruer (died 8 February 1923) was also a talented musician
- Arthur H. Otto, assistant organist at St Peter's Cathedral, organist at St John's July 1902 – 1909. Reorganised choir for traditional cathedral music. Later known as Arthur Kingston-Stewart, tenor.
- John Dempster, son of the Rev. R. W. G. Dempster, at St John's 1909–1924.
- Lloyd Vick (born 1915), 1939 at least, later of Manthorpe Memorial Church, Unley, and Clayton Memorial Church, Norwood.

== Some notable members ==
- Alfred Mundy
- W. Bacon Carter for many years Registrar-General of Lands Deeds and Titles
- Edward Logue
- Benjamin A. Kent, M.D.
- Henry Scott
- John Hance
- T. H. Viney
- Osmond Gilles
- H. Pope
- O. K. Richardson South Australian Under-Secretary
- A. Spence
- Charles Beck
- The Rev. W. S. Moore
- C. B. Newenham South Australia's first Auditor-General and Sheriff
- Hon. A. M. Mundy
- J. E. Moulden head of Moulden & Sons, lawyers
- Marshall MacDermott
- W. B. T. Andrews Registrar-General of Deeds
- The Rev. Edmund Jenkins
- Thomas Ward (for many years City Coroner)
- G. W. Hawkes
- Capt. Freeling, R.E.
- Commissioner J. G. Russell
- Neville Blyth
- His Honour Mr. Justice Jickling
- The Rev. S. T. C. Best
