= South Australian Literary Societies' Union =

Peak body of literary societies, 1883-1926

South Australian Literary Societies' Union (1883–1926) was a peak or advocacy organisation of literary societies in South Australia. It organised competitions between the member societies and established a "Union Parliament" to debate issues of the day.

In 1932 a similar organisation named Literary Societies' Union of South Australia was founded.

== History ==
A popular form of social and intellectual entertainment for young gentlemen in late nineteenth and early twentieth century Adelaide was the literary society, which at its peak numbered around fifty, some, perhaps most, attached to churches. Facilities and entertainments enjoyed by members apart from companionship of like-minded individuals, and perhaps a little networking, may have included:

- Maintenance of a library. At a time when the cost of a book could equal a workman's weekly wages, a valuable resource.
- Appearance of guest speakers
- Readings by members of original or favourite poetry or prose pieces
- Impromptu speeches on literary subjects
- Debates

=== Tournaments ===
Early in 1883 several of these "self-improvement" bodies resolved to have a tournament to test their various literary skills on stage before an audience. Preliminary contests for the "impromptu speaking" and "elocution" sections were held some weeks prior to reduce the number of contestants to a workable half-dozen. Original poetry and essay (on the subject "Federation of the Australian Colonies") were judged weeks beforehand. It was a condition of entry that debating partisan politics and sectarian religion was forbidden on penalty of disqualification. Thanks to some excellent organisation and the willing participation of some very distinguished public figures, the competition, held 16 August 1883 at the Adelaide Town Hall, where fifteen societies were represented, was deemed a success, though the standard of judging was questioned, and a useful profit realised and shared between the Children's Hospital and the Home for Incurables. Associations represented in the competition were: Adelaide Young Men's Society, North Adelaide Young Men's Society, Pirie Street Young Men's Society, Trinity Young Men's Society, St. John's Young Men's Society, Port Adelaide Young Men's Society, Norwood Social and Literary Club, St. Andrew's Young Men's Society, Caledonian Literary Society, St. Bartholomew's Young Men's Society, Hindmarsh Young Men's Society, Archer Street Young Men's Society, Unitarian Young Men's Society, Glenelg Literary Association, and the Hindmarsh Literary Association. Prominent among the instigators were W. H. Selway and T. H. Smeaton Claims by W. D. Ponder that the concept was his were refuted by George Hussey.

The Union was founded in September 1883 as a conference of 16 literary societies.

The Union's first official tournament (or competition as they were thenceforth titled) was held in the Adelaide Town Hall on 12 September 1884 and followed a similar format. Participating societies were the Kent Town Mutual Improvement Association, Adelaide Young Men's Society, Norwood Literary Society, St. Andrew's Young Men's Society, Pirie-street Literary Association, Glenelg Literary Association, Unitarian Young Men's Society, Y.M.C.A. Literary Society. Judges included Sir Henry Ayers, the Hon. R. A. Tarlton and Dr. E. C. Stirling. The poetry section was won and read by a female, Though ostensibly all-male, several of the Union's member societies admitted women as associate members.

The prize was an illuminated certificate, selected by competition. In 1895 the chosen work was by Frank Bartels.

=== Growth and decay ===
The Union comprised 18 member societies in December 1883, 34 in 1887, 35 in 1894, but only 23 in 1897. Membership recovered somewhat by 1899, thanks largely to the efforts of secretary Best, and by 1904 there were 44, but by 1910 interest had collapsed and in 1915 consisted of only seven associated societies. By 1913 the newspapers were devoting much of their space to the likelihood of war, and from 1914 literary attainments were a long way from the minds of most young men, and the societies would have been greatly depleted by those sent overseas. In 1920 there were only five member societies. The Union still existed in 1926, but little information is readily available.

In 1932 a similar society was formed, titled the Literary Societies' Union of South Australia. A 1937 newspaper article, after charting the rise and fall of the original Union, identifies the new Union with the original: "The continued growth of the Literary Societies' Union of South Australia, as it is now called, is proof of the societies' worth."

=== Yearbook ===
Yearbooks were published in 1884, 1885, 1886, 1887, 1888, 1889 1890, 1891 1892 1893, and 1894. There was no yearbook published in 1895 and 1896 due to costs, then resumed in 1897 when the Union's finances had recovered. Further yearbooks were published in 1898 and possibly the next year or two, but newspapers' interest had waned and were not mentioned. The yearbook, which had started as a simple record of the Union's activities, membership and finances, had increased in size and scope year by year until it boasted around 150 pages and included full texts of contest-winning articles and members' contributions. Then doubts arose as to the usefulness of such a publication, appearing so many months after the annual tournament. Plans were made to replace the yearbook with a monthly magazine, but that may have never eventuated.

=== Other activities ===
- Members of the Union staged a selection from Henry IV, part 1 and part 2 at Garner's Rooms in August 1884.

=== Presidents ===
- 1883–1889 Sir William Robinson, Governor of SA
- 1893 Harry Dickson Gell
- 1894 George Frederick Hussey (and general secretary 1885–1893)
- 1895 Patrick McMahon Glynn MP
- 1897 J. Langdon Bonython, elected life member 1897
- 1898 J. H. Symon
- 1899 Charles Todd
- 1900 Lancelot Stirling
- 1901 Professor William Mitchell
- 1903 Frederic Chapple
- 1904 Eustace B. Grundy KC
- 1905 S. Talbot Smith
- 1906 Prof. George Cockburn Henderson
- 1906 G. Fowler Stewart
- 1908 Arthur William Piper
- 1909 Professor H. Darnley Naylor MA
- 1909–1911 Dr. Richard Sanders Rogers
- 1913–1915 Herbert Sydney Hudd
- 1919–1924 Philip V. Colebatch
- 1925 Robert Johnston
- 1926 Isaac Dyer
- 1932 John T. Massey OBE
- 1934 Athol Bertram Johnston, barrister, formerly of Tasmania
- 1937 George Wheeldon, also of WEA

Some other officeholders

- Rev. W. R. Fletcher (vice president 1883– )
- Dr. Allan Campbell MLC (vice-president 1885–1889)
- J. R. Anderson treasurer 1885
- T. Stan Oldham (gen. secretary 1902–1909)
- Hermann Homburg (vice-pres 1906) son of Justice Homburg
- Albert C. Finlayson was at various times vice-president, treasurer and editor of the society magazine. He was a son of Robert Kettle Finlayson
- Alfred Odgers (c. 1843 – 19 July 1933) oldest surviving AEI alumnus, member of Reedbeds Cavalry, gen. sec. 1890–1893.
- Rev. S. T. C. Best (gen. sec. 1896–1901), credited with reviving the Union's moribund finances.
- Robert McCosh Pratt (vice-president 1900)
- Reginald Guy Lillywhite (1881– ) gen. sec. 1908–1910. He was in 1931 jailed for embezzling £800 from War Widows Fund in Melbourne
- Ebenezer Cheary hon. secretary 1920–1924, vice-president 1932
- C. L. Ryan secretary/treasurer 1932
- Francis Hack was a prominent member
- G. T. Clarke hon. secretary 1937

== Union Parliament ==
Union Parliament was an early innovation by the Literary Societies' Union, and similar to model parliaments elsewhere, but arguably the most successful in Australia. Participants in Union Parliament were all members of associated literary societies, the number of delegates from each society being proportional to its membership. Sittings were held fortnightly, originally in the Oddfellows' Hall in Franklin Street on alternate Thursdays and latterly on alternate Tuesdays at the YMCA hall, and attracted members of the public to witness the proceedings (the "Visitors' Gallery").

Certain positions in Union Parliament were elected annually by members of the Literary Societies' Union:

- Premier, who then had two weeks to appoint his Ministry
- Leader of the Opposition
- Speaker, a critical position, requiring an intimate knowledge of parliamentary Standing Orders as well as the wit and personality needed to maintain order, as Union Parliament could become as unruly as that on North Terrace. This position was held by only three men in the history of Union Parliament.
- Functionaries necessary to the operation of the Parliament (secretary, treasurer, clerk etc.)

The role of Governor (analogous to the State Governor, and whose only duties were ceremonial) was attached to whoever was the current president of the Literary Societies' Union.

=== The first year ===
The first sitting was held on 8 May 1884, and the Cabinet consisted of:

- J. G. Jenkins, Chief Secretary and Premier
- T. W. Fleming, Attorney-General
- J. Ashton, Treasurer
- H. D. Gell, Commissioner of Crown Lands
- F. Johnson, Commissioner of Public Works
- W. J. Sowden, Minister of Education
- T. H. Smeaton, Leader of the Opposition

non-party officers were:

- W. C. Calder, Speaker
- G. F. Hussey, Clerk (also Secretary and Treasurer)
- F. Hussey, Assistant Clerk
- J. T. Fitch, T. H. Smeaton, and R. M. Steele, committee

Subjects debated in the first sitting of Union Parliament were: Federation, free and compulsory education, the Bible in schools, stamps and progressive taxation, in many cases anticipating debates in State Parliament. Ashton delivered his first Budget Speech on 10 July 1884.

This Ministry lasted only a few months; it was brought down over a Bill for revision of the tariff. The new Ministry consisted of:

- Edward Kay (died 1934), Chief Secretary and Premier
- Thomas Gepp (died 1916), Attorney-General
- James Sadler (died 1935), Treasurer
- John Tassie (died 1934), Commissioner of Crown Lands and Immigration
- Thomas H. Smeaton, Commissioner of Public Works
- William Storrie jun., Sixth Minister

=== Speakers ===
In over 40 years Union Parliament had just three Speakers:

- W. C. Calder 1884–1894
- G. F. Hussey 1894–1924
- P. V. Colebatch 1925–

At first Union Parliament was regarded by the general public as a little presumptuous, and the object of some humour, but by virtue of the seriousness with which the members treated their hobby, this attitude receded. Members undoubtedly benefited by the experience and lessons learned, as witnessed by the number of public figures who remembered their time with the Union Parliament fondly.

=== Other Union Parliaments in South Australia ===
Some South Australian country towns established their own Union Parliaments. Saul Solomon (1836–1929), MLA for East Torrens 1887–90, was a founder of the Union Parliament in Mount Gambier in 1891.

== See also ==
Modern Pickwick Club, having similar aims, but not known to be a member organisation
