= St Paul's Church, Adelaide =

Anglican church in Adelaide, Australia

Coordinates: 34°55′36″S 138°36′22″E

St Paul's Church was an Anglican church on Pulteney Street, Adelaide, on the northeast corner of Pulteney and Flinders streets. It was built adjacent to the Pulteney Street School, predecessor of today's Pulteney Grammar School. The building still stands, and has been used as an entertainment venue.

== History ==
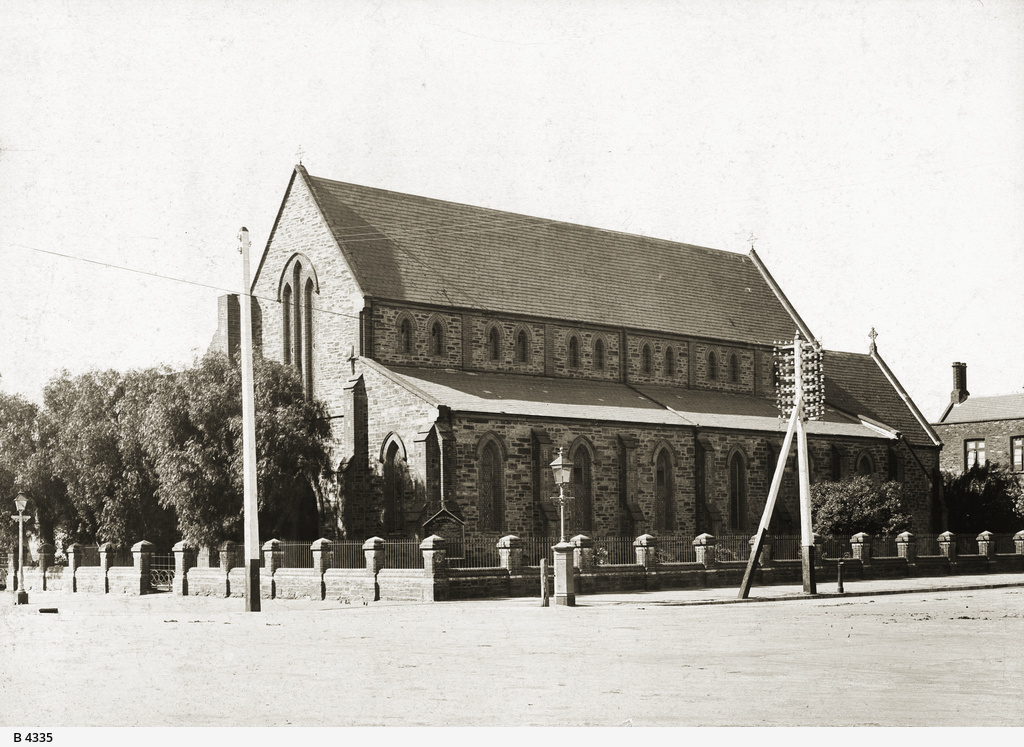
St Paul's Church c. 1927

In July 1855 Rev. A. R. Russell, rector of St John's Anglican church in the south-east of the city, recognising that his church was located some distance from the centre of population in the north-east, began holding services in the Pulteney Street School at the intersection of Pulteney and Flinders streets. On 15 April 1856 the foundation stone of a church, adjacent to the school, was laid by Governor MacDonnell. Edmund W. Wright was selected to design the structure, (Note: Another reference, not supported by contemporary newspapers, credits James Cumming.) in Early English Gothic style, and William Bundy the builder. Construction proceeded as funds became available, commencing with £200 from "Captain" William Allen. The consecration service was conducted on the evening 15 June 1860 by Frederic Barker, the Bishop of Sydney, and Augustus Short, the Bishop of Adelaide, assisted by James Farrell, the Dean of Adelaide, together with the Revs. Farr of St Peter's College, and Russell, the incumbent until his death in 1886.

St Paul's was, for reasons not fully explained, Adelaide's most popular Anglican church for weddings. Notable parishioners included John Cox Bray, Henry Ayers and his family, Sir James Ferguson and Lady Edith Ferguson (who occasionally presided on the organ), Judge Cooper and Lady Cooper, Judge Boothby, Captain Watts (Postmaster-General) and O. K. Richardson (Under Secretary). Ada Ayers, widow of Harry Lockett Ayers, commissioned a pair of stained glass memorial windows Angel of Faith and River of Life by Louis Comfort Tiffany (1848–1943), of Tiffany and Co., New York. They were installed in December 1909.

Attendance at the church dropped significantly during the Great War, largely due to the number of men who served overseas, but that doesn't entirely explain the reduction of the number of male worshippers dropping from hundreds to around five. The city was declining as a residential district, and St Paul's church membership continued to decline through the twentieth century. Sometime in the mid-1970s, St Paul's building was deconsecrated and in the early 1980s was turned into a nightclub or disco. In 1989 the Moore Corporation applied to the Council for permission to demolish the structure but were refused on the grounds that, though not protected by statute, the proposed development would detract from the manse adjacent which was heritage-listed. In 1991 the church was placed on the City of Adelaide heritage register. For several years the state government leased the building from its owners for use as a music and arts hub.

The "Tiffany Windows" were removed for safekeeping, and later installed in the Art Gallery of South Australia, Gallery 18.

=== Rectors of St Paul's Church ===
- A. R. Russell 1860–1886, previously at St John's, Adelaide. He continued there after 1869, when he was appointed Dean of Adelaide, until his death in 1886.
- J. W. Owen 1886–1890, previously at Mount Barker. Canon Samuel Green of St Paul's, Port Adelaide was offered the position but declined. Owen resigned in 1890.
- James Sunter 1890–1909, previously at St Anthony's Church, Newcastle-upon-Tyne
- Edward Herbert Bleby 1910–1943, previously rector of Melrose, died January 1943
- Arthur Edwards Kain 1943– , previously organising chaplain of the Bishop's Home Mission Society in the diocese of Adelaide. He was canonized around 1948.

== Pulteney Street School ==
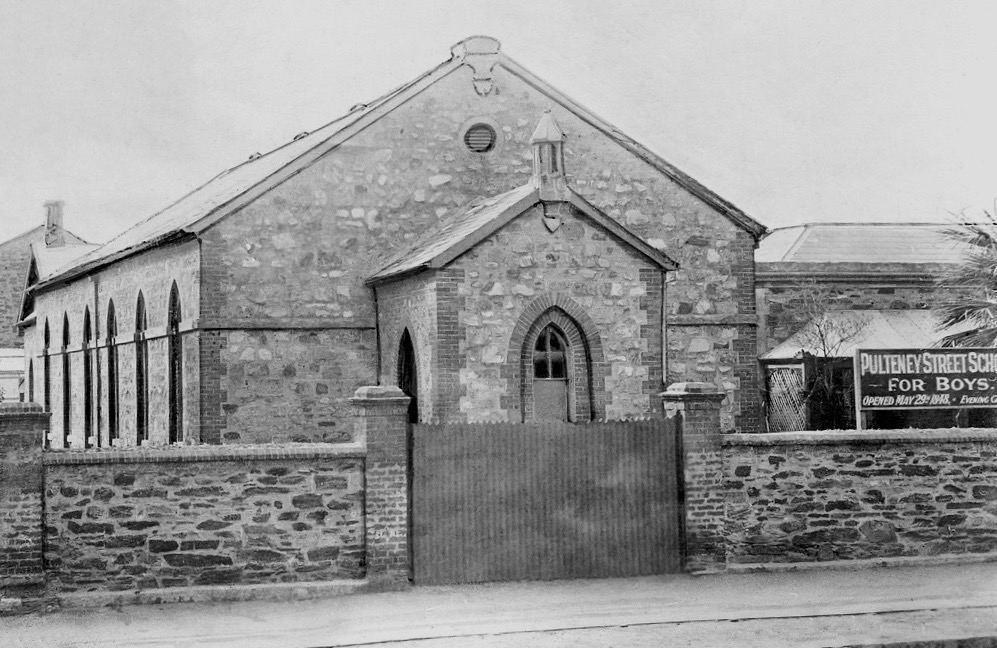
Pulteney Street School c. 1919

The Pulteney Street School opened in a newly erected 60 by 30 feet (18.3 by 9.1 m) Gothic building on the northern half of town acre 228 at the northeast corner of the intersection of Pulteney and Flinders streets in May 1848. Though sponsored by the Church of England, it accepted pupils from all denominations, and its fees were modest as compared with the Collegiate School. Three months later, 81 students (boys and girls) were enrolled and the teaching staff numbered five ladies and four gentlemen. In 1852 the school was renamed Pulteney Street Central Schools, reflecting its changed status as a State-approved school, receiving financial support from the South Australian government. The name reverted to "Pulteney Street School" in 1884. Major extensions to the building were made in 1897, In 1919 the Government acquired its site for the Repatriation Building, and for two years classes were conducted in Hindmarsh Square Congregational Church Sunday School, then in 1921 the school moved to an Anglican church-owned site on South Terrace and adopted the name "Pulteney Grammar School". (Note: The school had also been known by that name, during the headmastership of W. H. Howard, later Canon Howard.)

Headmasters at Pulteney Street
Edmund King Miller 1847–1850
W. A. Cawthorne 1852–1855
R. C. Mitton 1855–1857
William Samuel Moore August 1861 – June 1884
Walter Henry Howard 1884 – March 1898
Donald Alexander Kerr 1898–1900
John Benbow (priest) a few months in 1901
W. Percy Nicholls 1901–1918; in 1921 moving to the new school on South Terrace.

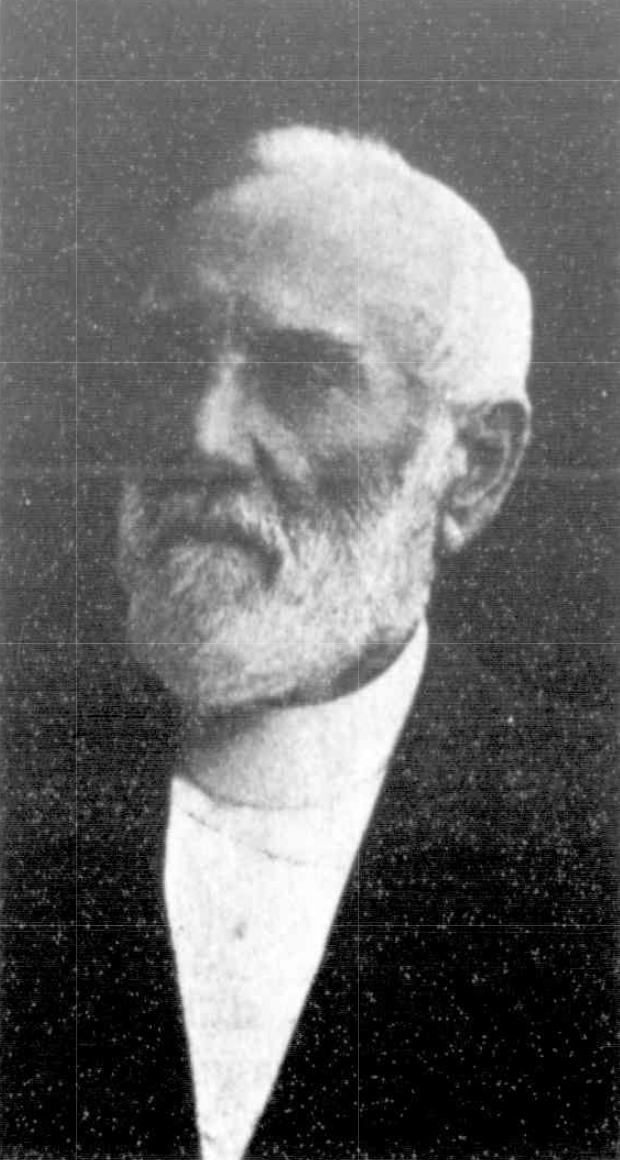
E. K. Miller

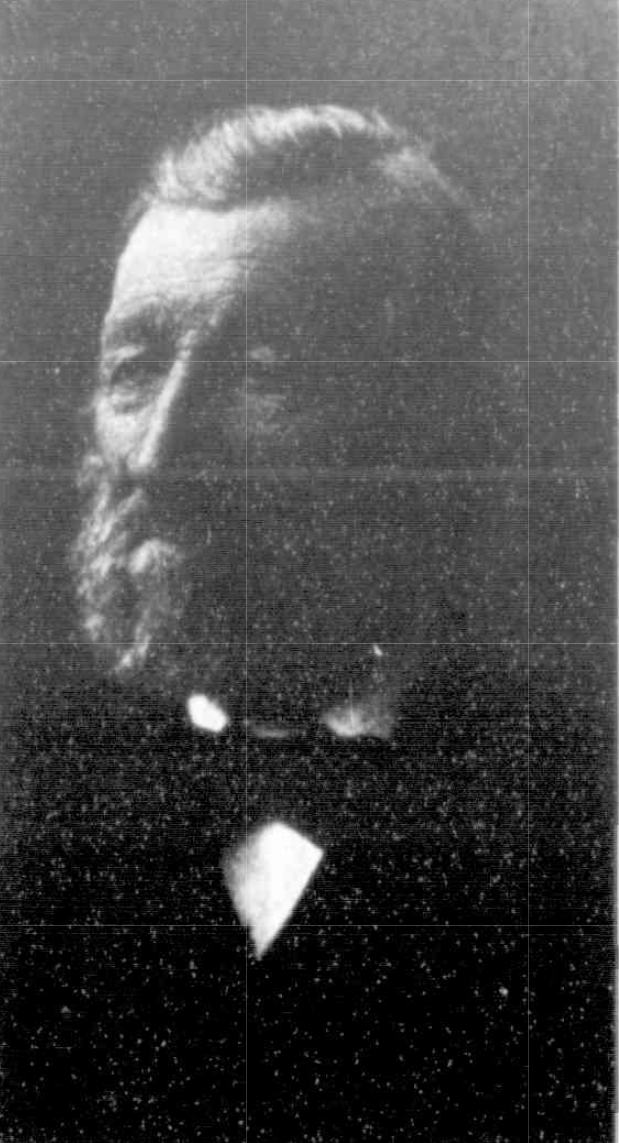
R. C. Mitton

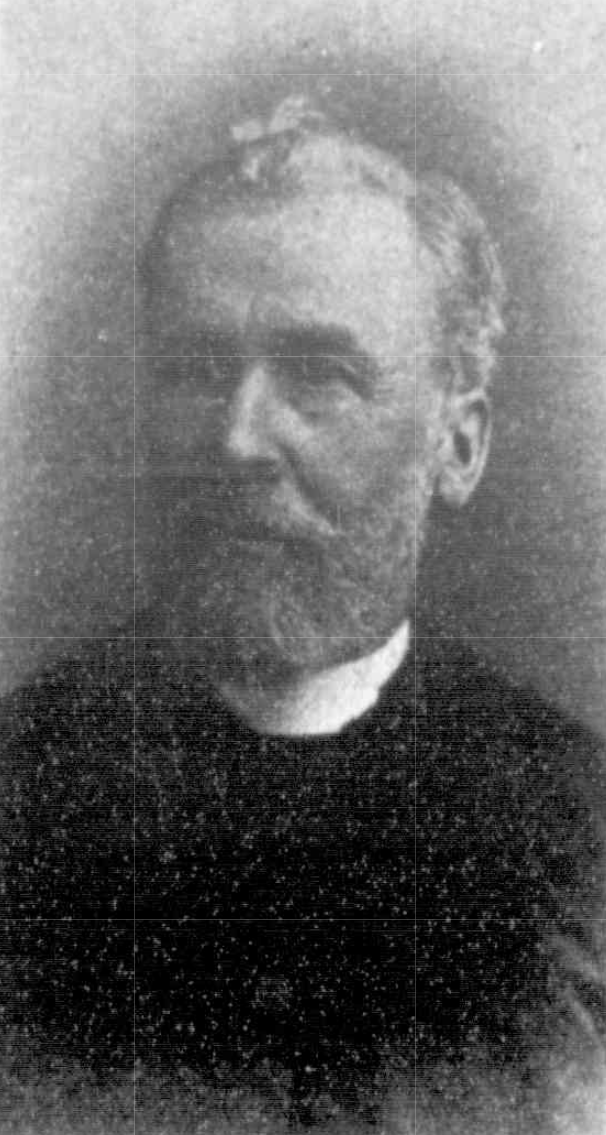
W. S. Moore

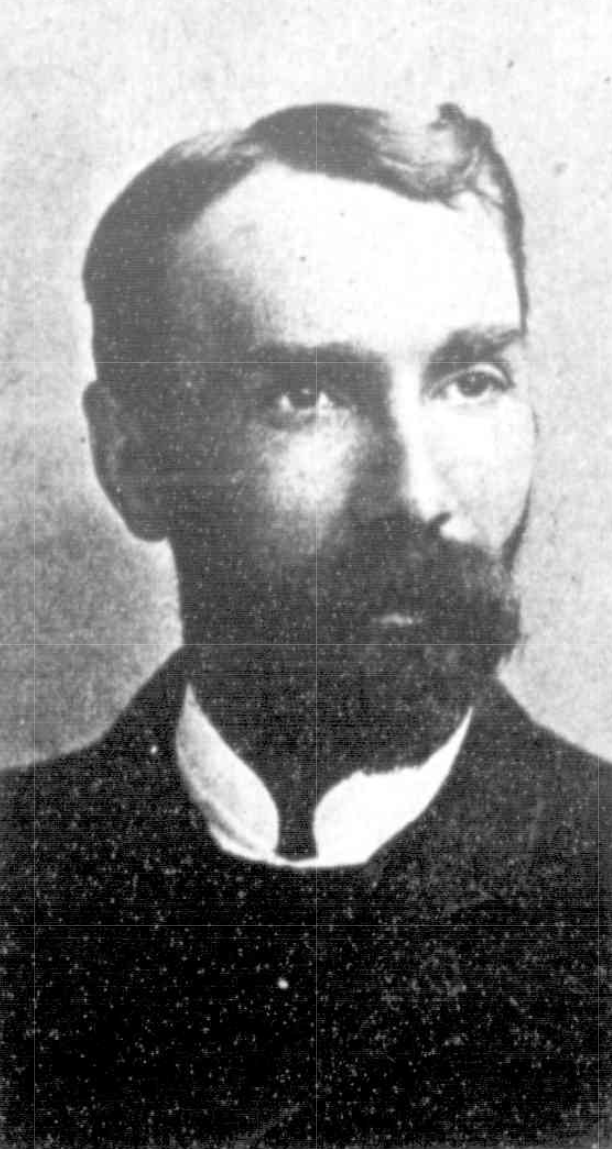
W. H. Howard

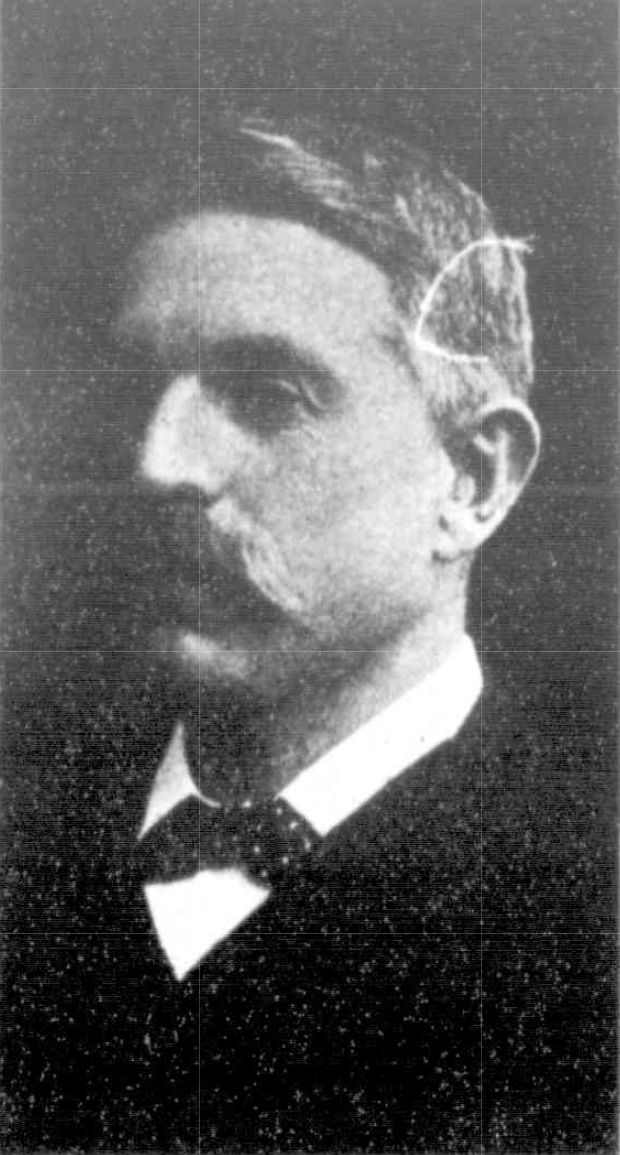
W. P. Nicholls
