= E. K. Miller =

Rev. Edmund King Miller (c. 1820 – 17 May 1911), invariably known as E. K. Miller, was an Anglican minister in South Australia, the first principal of the Pulteney Street School in Adelaide.

== History ==
Pulteney Street School, a "pretty Gothic building" 30 by 60 feet (9.1 by 18.3 m) opened with seven pupils at the corner of Pulteney and Flinders streets on 29 May 1848. This was ten months after St Peter's College opened in the schoolhouse of Trinity Church but six years before it had its own premises in Hackney. The school was clearly targeted at a different demographic, having a monthly charge of 2/6d per month for each pupil, deemed "a rate which the poorest can surely afford to pay for the education of their children". and by October 180 pupils had registered. The school initially catered for both boys and girls and was not restricted to Anglican families, attendance at Catechism classes being optional.

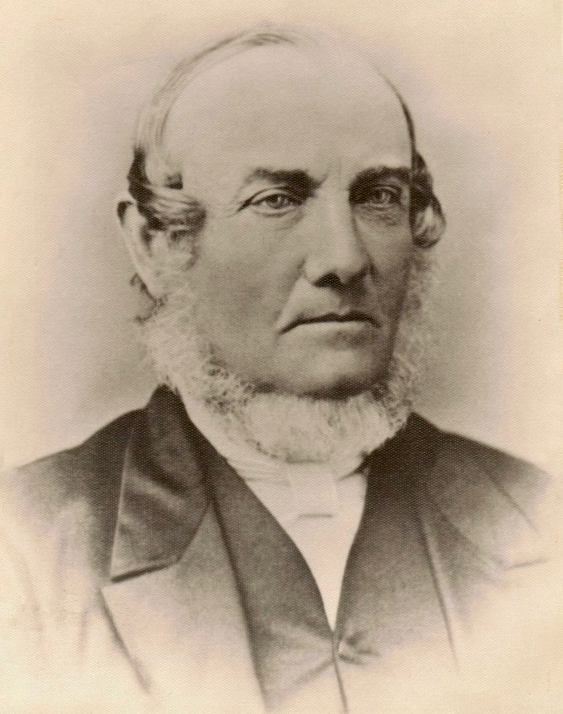
Revd E.K. Miller, first Headmaster of Pulteney Grammar School

Rev. Miller, who had previously held a similar position near Rotherham, Yorkshire, and his wife Mary Miller, née Kirtland, arrived in South Australia aboard Hindoo in April 1848 to take the position of headmaster, He was one of the two first clergymen to be ordained in the Diocese of Adelaide.

He was twelfth Anglican clergyman in South Australia, the others being:

- Bishop Short arrived December 1847
- Archdeacon Hale, stationed for a short time at Kensington and afterwards at St John's Church, Adelaide
- Rev James Farrell, Trinity Church
- Rev W. J. Woodcock, St. John's and afterwards Christ Church, North Adelaide
- George C. Newenham, St Paul's, Port Adelaide
- James Pollitt, St James Church, Mount Barker
- J. C. Bagshaw, Burra
- A. B. Burnett, St Stephen's, Willunga
- W. H. Coombs, St George's, Gawler
- John Fulford, St Mary's on the Sturt
- T. P. Wilson briefly at SPC and St Johns, then returned to England

(By 1853 the number had grown to 19.)

Miller was required to combine headmasterly duties with those of assistant minister of Christ Church, North Adelaide, but appears to have had a breakdown and after three years, on medical advice ("either the madhouse or the cemetery"), he resigned from the school. Rev. Frederick Lamb and Mrs Lamb, who arrived in May 1851 took his place. By June 1852 the institution had become Pulteney Street Central Schools with W. A. Cawthorne appointed headmaster.

In 1852 Miller took charge of St. George's, Magill, and was able to minister to victims of a diphtheria outbreak in the district. At considerable risk to himself he treated the throats of those affected with a caustic pencil, at that time the only effective remedy. His wife, who had nursed the family of Dr. Wark, caught the disease, as did her three children, and Miller nursed them as no one else dared come near.

In 1863 Miller moved to Willunga, which also encompassed Aldinga and Noarlunga. He retired this cure on 1 January 1892 to live in Semaphore, where he was active in supporting local charitable organizations, notably the Deaf and Dumb institutions at Brighton and Wright Street, Adelaide, and the Convalescent Home at Semaphore.

Miller was a regular contributor to the correspondence columns of The South Australian Register over a long period. Recurrent themes were his love of the Book of Common Prayer and his antipathy to the promotion of high church liturgy by a powerful cabal of Anglicans.

== Family ==
Miller married Mary Kirtland (c. 1821 – 29 October 1894) in England before leaving for Australia. Their children included:

- Thomas Rhodes Miller (1849–1916) married Jane Todd Carrick (c. 1840 – 26 March 1898) in 1872; he married again, to Sarah Ann Best ( – ) in 1898, lived in Renmark
- Mary Ellen Miller (1853–1928) married Thomas William Jones (c. 1855 – 4 July 1927) in 1878, lived in Western Australia
- Isabella Ann Miller (1855–1920) married Alfred Everard Lucy (1854–1927) in 1877, lived at Second Valley
- Edmund King Miller, jun. (1857– ) married Sarah Ann Rusk (c. 1851 – 7 July 1938) in 1882 lived Leederville, Western Australia
- Francis Henry "Frank" Miller (1867 – c. 15 December 1904) married Catherine Paltridge "Kate" McKenzie (1868–1960) on 22 April 1896

== Bibliography ==
- Miller, E. K. (1895) Forty-Seven Years of Clerical Life in South Australia
- Miller, E. K. (1910?) Occasional Papers on Church Matters

He also wrote for the local press, essays on subjects dear to his heart:

- "Banishing the British Book of Common Prayer". The Register (Adelaide). Vol. LXXII, no. 18, 764. South Australia. 3 January 1907. p. 3 – via National Library of Australia.
