= State aid =

State aid may refer to:

- a subsidy given by a state or government
- State aid (European Union)
- State aid (Australia), government support for non-government schools

== See also ==
- State aid for libraries in the United States
