= W. H. Coombs =

Anglican minister

The Reverend Canon William Henry Coombs (November 1816 – 22 September 1896), remembered as "Canon Coombs", was an Anglican minister in Gawler, South Australia, whose record of 48 years serving the same parish has been recognised as an Australian record.

== History ==
Coombs was born in New Windsor, England or Marlborough, Wiltshire, the son of an ironmonger or a banker, and early attracted to the church. He taught Sunday School in London alongside Rev. E. K. Miller; both read for holy orders under Rev. W. J. Woodcock, and trained for overseas service at St Bee's College. Following an appeal from the Society for the Propagation of the Gospel in Foreign Parts in 1846, Woodcock and James Pollitt left for missionary service in Australia. In 1846 Coombs had just begun his church career as curate of St. Martin's-in-the-Fields, Trafalgar Square, London, when he was approached by the S.P.G. to follow them, as the Gawler church needed a minister. He was ordained deacon by Bishop Blomfield of London at St Paul's Cathedral. With his new wife, Coombs left for Australia in July 1846. Arriving in Sydney, he was licensed by Bishop Broughton of Sydney, and traveled on to Adelaide, arriving on 14 November and attended St John's Church the following day and Trinity Church the next week. The week after he conducted Gawler's first Anglican service, in Stephen King's "Victoria Mill" on Jacob Street. They would later meet in Murphy's schoolroom while waiting for the new church building. Coombs and his wife moved into "Floraville", Younghusband's property in North Gawler, where they stayed until 1848, when the parsonage in Gawler East was completed. His church, St George's is one of the oldest in the diocese, the first building having been consecrated on 21 March 1848 by Short. On 29 June that year, in the first such ceremony in South Australia, he was ordained priest by Bishop Short at Trinity Church. In 1854 he was appointed Rural Dean of Gawler and minor Canon of the Adelaide Cathedral in 1858.

The foundation stone of what would be the first Anglican church north of Adelaide was laid on 4 March 1847 by Governor Robe, and on 28 March 1848 the building was consecrated by Bishop Short. There were problems with the building's construction, and in any case the congregation had outgrown it, and a replacement became imperative. On 6 June 1858 the foundation stone of its replacement was laid by Mrs Short. Gawler's second Anglican church was designed by E. A. Hamilton in Early English style. The foundation stone was laid on 6 January 1858 but the bishop refused consecration of the building due to the trust-deed, which gave church trustees veto power over management decisions, where the Model Trust Deed vested decision-making in congregation and synod. The transept, which had been provided for by Hamilton, had its foundation stone laid on 4 December 1884, and the building was consecrated on 23 April 1895 by Bishop Kennion. The tower and bells, so much desired by Coombs, would not be erected until after his death.

Coombs, in little short of 50 years had seen the church grow from an outpost in the bush to a centrepiece of a cultured community, a "Colonial Athens".

The rev. gentleman was possessed of a good deal of native dignity and culture, was thoroughly devoted to his Church, and was loved by those who were associated with him.

He died suddenly, having conducted the Sunday service then fallen ill on the Tuesday, and died in the night with the doctor in attendance, heart failure and bronchitis having been the diagnosis.

The east window, a lead-glass work depicting the Ascension by Herbert M. Smyrk at the Gawler studio of E. F. Troy and unveiled on 4 May 1898, was dedicated to his memory.

== Family ==
Coombs married Eliza ( – 31 July 1898) before July 1846. They had no children.

== Recognition ==
Coombs Place, in the suburb of Kambah, Australian Capital Territory, was named for him.
