= Pollitt =

Pollitt is a surname, and may refer to:

- James Pollitt (also known as Harry Pollitt) (1924–), Test Pilot
- Alice Pollitt (1929–2016), American baseball player
- George Pollitt (1874–unknown), English cricketer
- Harry Pollitt (1890–1960), trade unionist, General Secretary of the Communist Party of Great Britain
- Harry Pollitt (engineer) (1864–1945), British locomotive engineer
- Herbert Charles Pollitt (also known as Jerome Pollitt) (1871-1942), British arts patron and female impersonator.
- James Pollitt (1826–1860), English cricketer
- James Pollitt (priest) (1813–1881), Anglican minister in South Australia
- Jerome J. Pollitt (1934–2024), American art historian and professor
- Katha Pollitt (born 1949), American poet, essayist and critic
- Mike Pollitt (born 1972), English footballer
- Tessa Pollitt (born 1959), punk musician
- Tom Pollitt (1900–1979), English cricketer and Royal Air Force officer
- William Pollitt, British railway manager (1842–1908)

== Fictional characters ==
- Big Daddy Pollitt and all his family, characters in Cat on a Hot Tin Roof
