= Donald A. Kerr =

Donald Alexander Kerr BA (10 April 1859 – 5 July 1919) was an Anglican minister and educator in South Australia, remembered for his period as headmaster of Pulteney Grammar School. His son, also Donald Kerr, was a highly regarded lawyer and legal scholar who survived three years as a stretcher-bearer at the front during World War I, and died after a foiled suicide.

== History ==
Kerr was born in Clare, South Australia in 1859, a son of (William) Isaac Kerr (c. 1829 – 16 June 1859), of some local interest, historically. (Note: Among his siblings was a sister Williamina Kerr (c. 1855 – 1915), who married Christian Ludwig Meyer in 1878, and an older (eldest ?) brother, Joseph Gordon Kerr, who died in 1882, aged 26. No further details have been found.) His mother Roberta Kerr (c. 1834 – 16 March 1861) also died young. An order was raised for the guardianship of his children.

He was educated at Stanley Grammar School in Watervale and St Peter's College, matriculating in 1879. He studied at the University of Adelaide, and was awarded his BA in 1883, one of its first graduates, and was ordained in the Church of England in Adelaide, December 1883 and posted to the south-eastern mission.

He served as minister of St Paul's church, Narracoorte, where he opened St Paul's Grammar School as headmaster in April 1884. He suffered a breakdown in his health in November 1884. Following the organisation of the Narracoorte, Lucindale, and Frances churches into an incumbency, a clergyman was appointed, who also took charge of the Grammar School and Kerr was made assistant master at the Mount Gambier High School. He was forced by ill-health to return to Adelaide in August 1887.

He was appointed a tutor at Prince Alfred College in 1888, later second master, but resigned in 1891 on account of ill-health, and left for London by the ship Torrens for a "sea cure". He returned in 1892 as a married man, and resumed his duties at Prince Alfred's.

In 1898 he replaced Rev. W. H. Howard as headmaster of Pulteney Street School. He resigned in November 1900 due to ill-health, and was replaced by Rev. J. Benbow. It was during his time as headmaster, in 1899, that he succeeded Canon Pollitt as Inspector of Church Schools in the Diocese of Adelaide. serving to 1914.

He conducted Glenelg Grammar School 1901–1905, when the school was taken over by Rev. W. A. Moore, son of Rev. W. S. Moore.

=== As minister ===
His service as an educator alternated with religious duties: he was ordained deacon in 1884 and served as assistant curate at various churches, such as Christ Church, Strathalbyn, in 1886, then as curate at Christ Church, North Adelaide, 1896-1898. He served as parish priest in various locations: Mount Pleasant, in 1899, St Paul's Church, Adelaide, in 1900, St Agnes' Church, Grange, from 1906, and Christ Church, Yankalilla 1907–1910, St Luke's, Whitmore Square, in 1911 and Kapunda 1911–1916, visiting England in 1914 for the sake of his health, which was deteriorating. He left Kapunda for a Locum tenens position in Tasmania, but his health suffered and in 1918 he left for Brisbane, and received a locum (for Rev. Walter Scott) at St Thomas's Church, Toowong, (Note: The Presbyterian minister at Toowong was the well-known Rev. Richard Kerr, but there is no reason to suspect a close family relationship.) where he died a year later, and where his funeral service was conducted by Bishop Henry Le Fanu.

== Family ==
Donald A. Kerr BA (1859–1919) married Emma Bevis (Beviss ?) Pope (died July 1939) in London in late 1891. Emma was a sister of solicitors William (1846 – 27 August 1923) and Thomas Pope (died in Torquay 24 September 1938), and of Mary Pope, who married Henry Foote (died 1893) in 1885, Edward Lay in 1895. Mary Lay left a small fortune to the Kerr family in 1931.

They had one child:

- Donald Kerr, MM LLD (1893 – 30 January 1928) enrolled with the First AIF, served overseas as an ambulance driver and was awarded the Military Medal in 1917, citing "conspicuous services" He was a prominent lawyer, author of several treatises:

The Law of the Australian Constitution 1925
The Principle of the Australian Land Titles (Torrens) System 1927
The Law of the Australian Constitution 1928

He married Marjorie Jane Johns (1894–1968) in 1918 and had four children:
- Donald Beviss Kerr (27 June 1919 – 15 December 1942) noted poet, killed in plane crash during WWII.
- Margaret Beviss Kerr (19 December 1920 – )
- Charles William Beviss Kerr (23 February 1922 – 1962)
- David Ian Beviss Kerr (28 April 1924 – 23 April 2005) later physiology researcher and academic, Sydney University.
He attempted suicide by opening the gas tap and slashing his wrists, but was still alive when admitted to hospital, where he died two days later. He was due to present evidence to the Commonwealth Constitution Commission the following day, having studied and written extensively on the subject. Other explanations for his last actions have been advanced.
