= John Michael Crossland =

British-Australian portrait painter (1800–1858)

- Born: 1800; England
- Died: 1858 (aged 57–58); Encounter Bay
- Occupation: Painter

John Michael Crossland (29 September 1799, York - 1858, Encounter Bay) was an English portrait painter who spent his last years in Australia.

== Biography ==
His father, John Sr., was a Sergeant Major in the 31st Regiment of Foot. Nothing is known of him for certain until he began his first studies at the Royal Academy School. After 1832, he was a frequent exhibitor at the Royal Academy and the Society of British Artists. Some of his best known portraits from that period were of officials at St. Anne's Society.

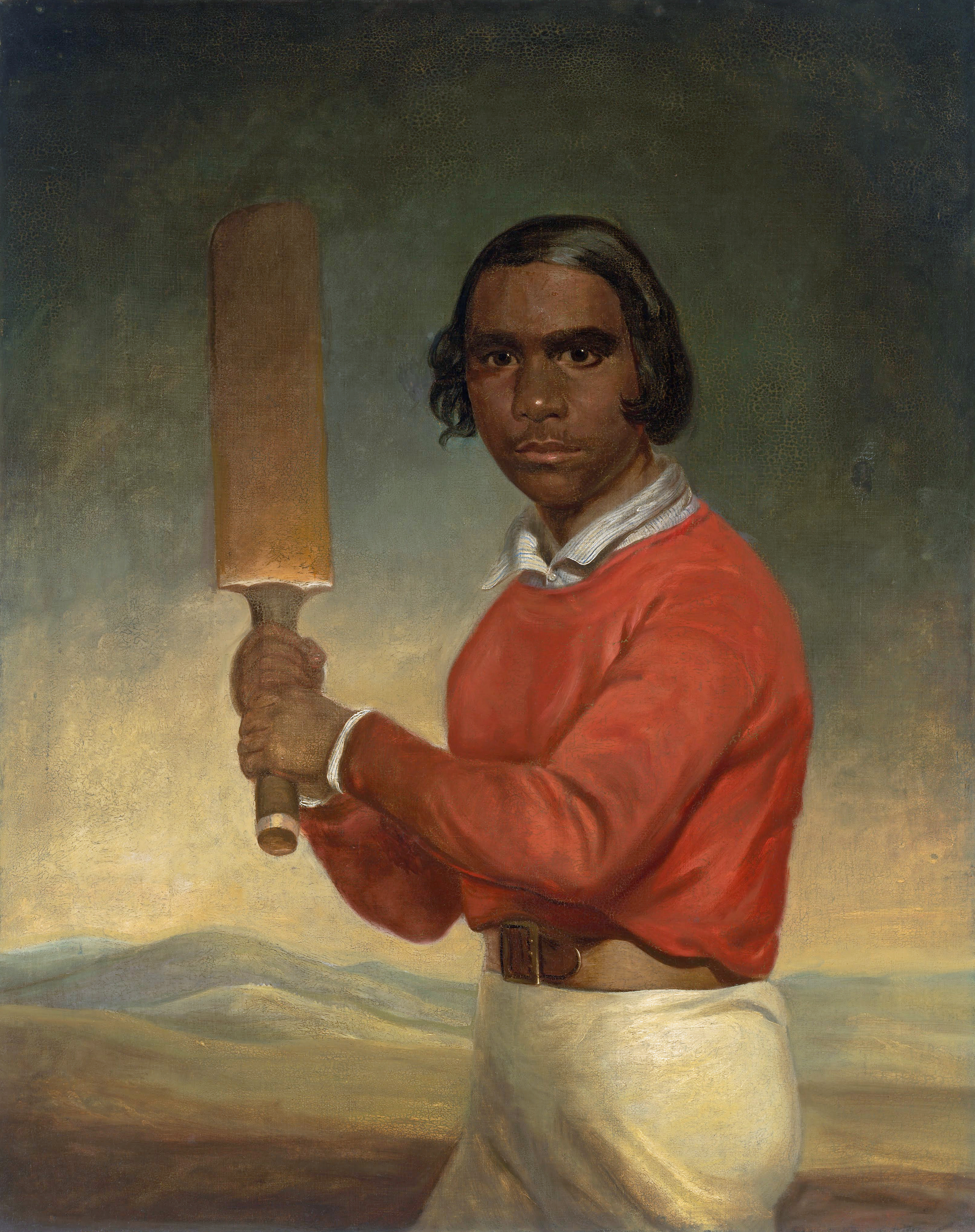
Portrait of the Cricketer, Nannultera

In 1833, he married Jane Clarke Worledge and they would eventually have ten children. He apparently travelled to Italy, as he held an exhibition of Italian-themed paintings and one of his sons was christened Jerome Ambrosini.

In 1851, he and his family, then numbering seven children, emigrated to Australia, settling in Adelaide, South Australia. He was the only classically trained portrait painter in South Australia at that time. His most familiar portraits were a series on Captain Charles Sturt, including an official portrait for Parliament House, completed in 1853. Among his other well-known sitters were Henry Young, Sir Charles Cooper, George Fife Angas and the Very Reverend James Farrell, Anglican Dean of Adelaide.

Today, he is remembered for having created the first known professional portraits of Aboriginal Australians, commissioned in 1854 by Archdeacon Matthew Hale, who had created a community at Poonindie with an eye towards converting them to Christianity and integrating them into society. The paintings of Nannultera and Samuel Kandwillan are currently in the possession of the National Library of Australia.

He was represented at the first exhibition of the South Australian Society of Arts (1857) and was shown there posthumously for several years after his death in 1858, apparently from tuberculosis.

== Gallery of works ==
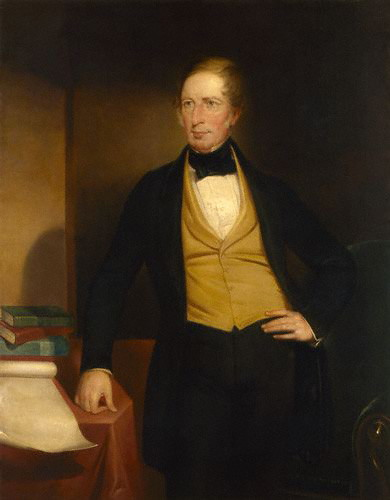
Charles Sturt by John Michael Crossland

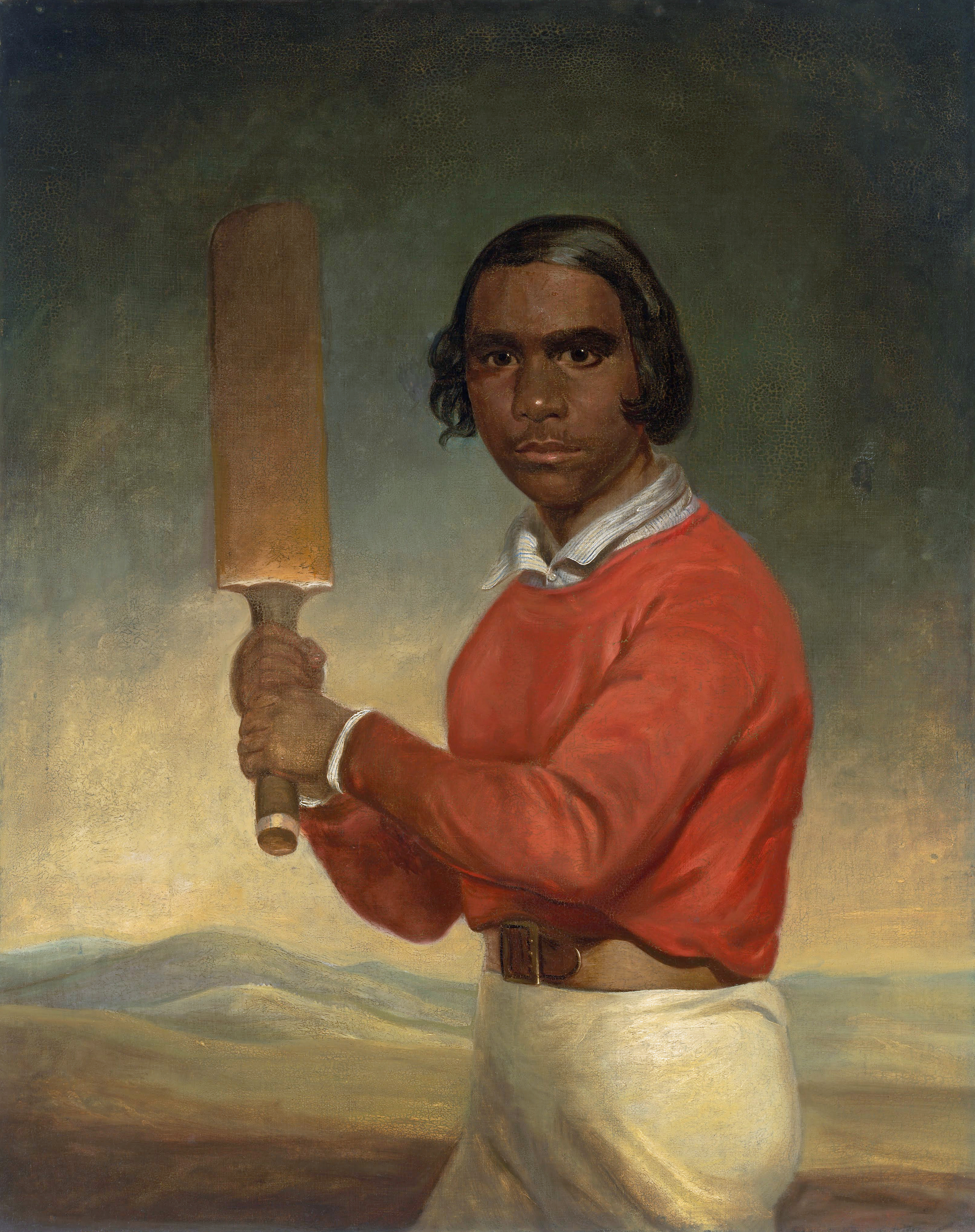
Nannultera, a young cricketer of the Natives' Training Institution, Poonindie, 1854. National Library of Australia.

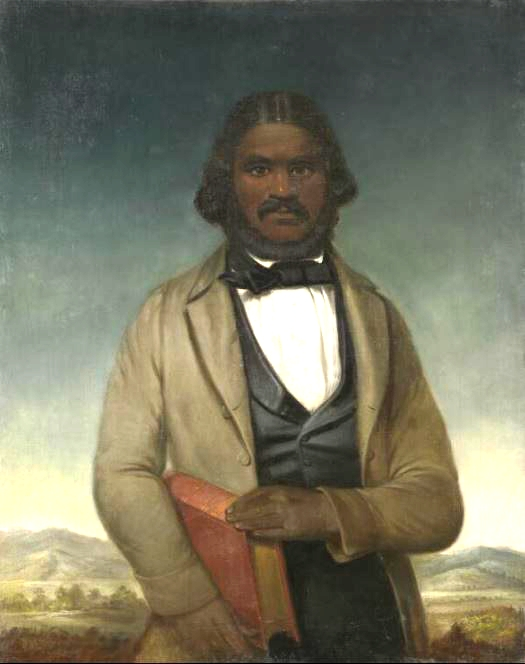
Samuel Kandwillan, a catechist of the Natives' Training Institution, Poonindie, 1854. National Library of Australia.

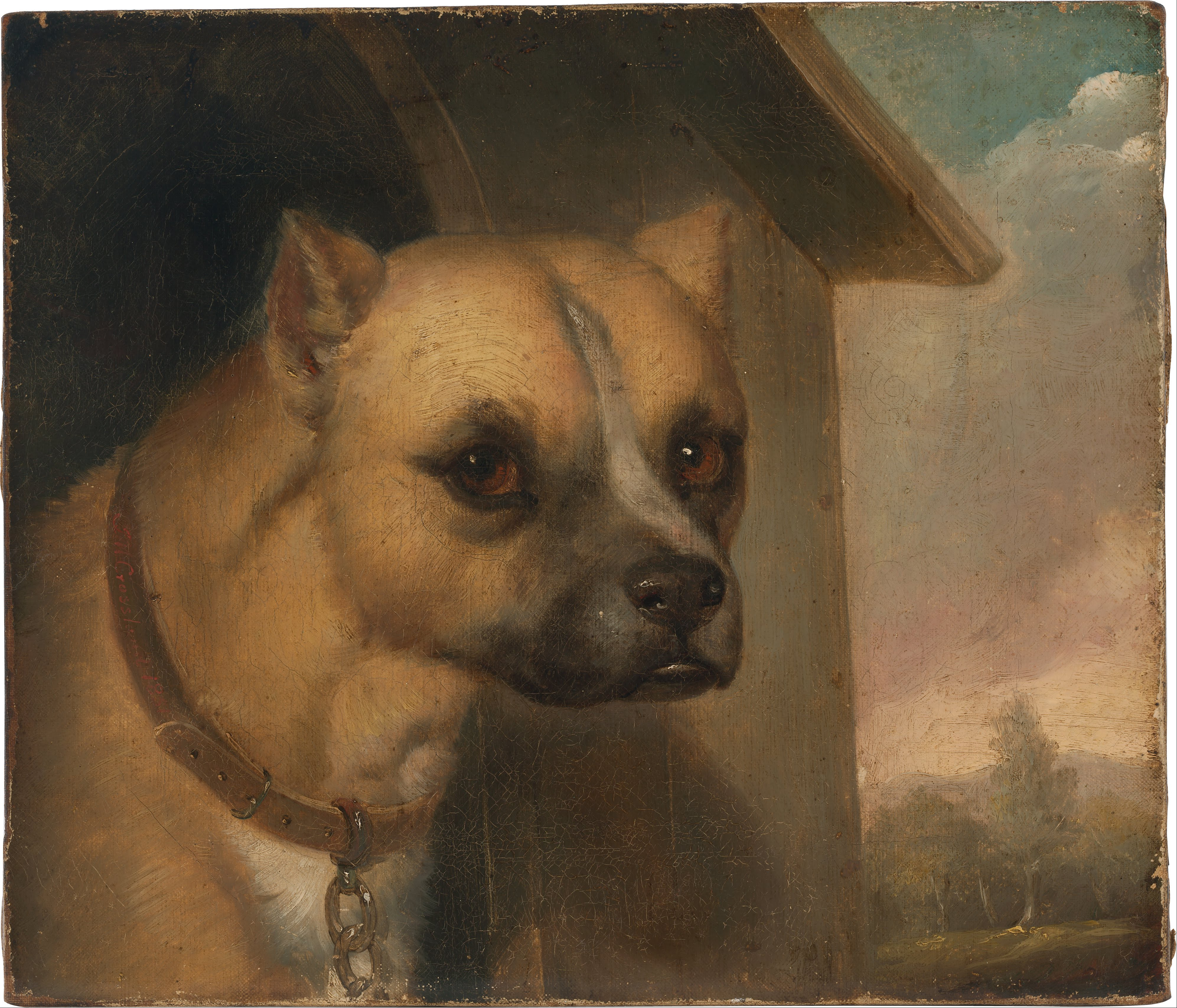
Staffordshire bull terrier belonging to the Rev. John Gowe, by Crossland
