= Blinman (surname) =

Blinman is a surname. Notable people with the surname include:

- Chad Blinman, American recording engineer and music producer
- Harry Blinman, (1861–1950), Australian cricketer and public servant

== See also ==
- Blinman, a locality in the Australian state of South Australia
