= 1929 SAAFL season =

1929 premiership season
- Date: 4 May - 7 September
- Premiers: A1: University; A2: Teachers' Training College
- Minor premiers: A1: University; A2: Kingswood
- Best and fairest: A1 (Hone Medal): Chris Sangster (University cap.); A2 (Richards Medal): Jack Woods (Prince Alfred O.C.)
- Leading goalkicker: A1: Frank Finlayson (University) 53 goals A2: George Downs (Teachers Training College) 81 goals

The 1929 SAAFL season was the 15th season of the South Australian Amateur Football League (SAAFL).

The 1929 season commenced on 4 May and concluded on 7 September.

The third Old Scholars club in four years was admitted into the SAAFL, when Scotch Old Collegians joined section A2. The A2 finalists of 1928, Underdale and St. Augustine, were promoted into A1 replacing Teachers Training College and Kingswood who were relegated into A2. This gave A1 and A2 7 teams each. This system of promotion/relegation has continued throughout the SAAFL/AdFL. Scotch O.C. home ground was "near the old South Terrace station" in the south parklands near Pulteney Grammar (most likely in Park 20).

== A1 ==
Semaphore Central, University A, Kenilworth, South Adelaide Ramblers, Henley & Grange, Underdale, and St. Augustines

=== Ladder ===
Pos	Team	Pld	W	L	D	Pts
1	University	12	11	1	0	22
2	Underdale United	12	10	2	0	20
3	Kenilworth	12	9	3	0	18
4	Semaphore Central	12	5	7	0	10
5	St. Augustine	12	3	9	0	6
6	Henley and Grange	12	3	9	0	6
7	South Adelaide Ramblers	12	1	11	0	2

=== Finals ===
==== Semi finals ====
	Semi Finals
Saturday, 24 August	University 10.10	def. by	Kenilworth 10.12	Wayville Showground Oval
Saturday, 24 August	Underdale 9.3	def. by	Semaphore Central 11.9	Jubilee Oval

==== Final ====
	Final
Saturday, 31 August	Kenilworth	def. by	Semaphore Central	Jubilee Oval

==== Challenge final ====
	Challenge Final
Saturday, 7 September	University 11.11	def.	Semaphore Central 10.10	Jubilee Oval

== A2 ==
Kingswood, Teachers' Training College, Prince Alfred O.C., University B, St. Peter's O.C., Y.M.C.A., and Old Scotch Collegians.

=== Ladder ===
Pos	Team	Pld	W	L	D	Pts
1	Kingswood	12	12	0	0	24
2	Teachers Training College	12	10	2	0	20
3	Prince Alfred Old Collegians	12	7	5	0	14
4	Saint Peters Old Collegians	12	7	5	0	14
5	Y.M.C.A	12	3	9	0	6
6	Scotch Old Collegians	12	2	10	0	4
7	University B	12	1	11	0	2

=== Finals ===
==== Semi finals ====
	Semi Finals
Saturday, 24 August	Kingswood 13.14	def.	Prince Alfred O.C. 6.7	Glenelg Oval
Saturday, 24 August	Teachers' Training College 16.15	def.	St. Peter's O.C. 6.7	St. Peter's College Oval

==== Final ====
	Final
Saturday, 31 August	Kingswood 3.7	def. by	Teachers' Training College 6.4	Alberton Oval

==== Challenge final ====
	Challenge Final
Saturday, 7 September	Kingswood 13.4	def. by	Teachers' Training College 15.12	Glenelg Oval

== Representative ==
=== vs Metropolitan Amateur Football Association ===
SAAFL
B:	Stephenson (Kenilworth)	Montgomery (Semaphore Central)	McDonald (Kenilworth)
HB:	Waldeck (Prince Alfred O.C.)	O'Regan (Semaphore Central)	McDougall (St. Augustines)
C:	Evans (University)	Packham (St. Augustines)	Jordan (South Adelaide Ramblers)
HF:	Smith (Kenilworth)	Webber (Underdale)	Sangster (capt.) (University)
F:	Morton (St. Augustines)	Finlayson (University)	King (Kenilworth)
Foll:	Cocks (South Adelaide Ramblers)	Dunn (Kenilworth)	Jones (Semaphore Central)
Res:	Colly (St. Augustines)	Moore (South Adelaide Ramblers)	Lee (St. Peter's O.C.)
Coach:	Hugh Millard		

Monday, 3 June	Metropolitan Amateur Football Association	def.	South Australian Amateur Football League	Albert Cricket Ground, Melbourne
1.4; 7.10; 10.11; 14.16 (100)	Q1; Q2; Q3; Final	6.4; 7.6; 9.14; 10.16 (76)
Ewing 5, Oldis 2, Smith 2, Cussen 2, Cassidy, Robinson, Dudfield	Goals	King 3, Webber 3, Evans 2, Finlayson, Sangster
Best	Sangster, Evans, O'Regan, McDougall, King, Jones

=== vs Port Pirie Football Association ===
SAAFL
B:	M. McDonald (Kenilworth)	D. W. F. Montgomery	E. Colley (St. Augustines)
HB:	A. G. Waldeck (Prince Alfred O.C.)	E. O'Regan (Semaphore Central)	J. Molan (Underdale)
C:	G. Beatty (Kenilworth	K. W. Packham (capt.) (St. Augustines)	S. Milne
HF:	W. Kempster (South Adelaide Ramblers)	R. Prideaux (Semaphore Central)	A. Reinberg (Semaphore Central)
F:	G. Murray (Kenilworth)	F. H. Finlayson (University)	B. Minear (v.c.) (Underdale)
Foll:	E. Toms (Semaphore Central)	Harris (Henley & Grange)	L. King (Kenilworth)
Res:	L. C. Bridgland (St. Peter's O.C.)	J. W. Smith (Kenilworth)	J. T. Woods (Prince Alfred O.C.)
Coach:	H. J. Richards		

Saturday, 10 August	Port Pirie Football Association	def.	South Australian Amateur Football League	Memorial Oval, Port Pirie (crowd: 2000)
13.21	Q1; Q2; Q3; Final	11.12
Fawcett 6, Bridgman 3, Patterson 2, Howard, Waters	Goals	Toms 3, Finlayson 2, Minear 2, Bridgland, Harris, Prideaux, Rosenthal
Leahey, Walsh, Fawcett, Belcher, Waters, Ryan, Laube, Hannan, Howard	Best	Minear, Packham, Bridgland, O'Regan, Beatty, Reinberg, Toms, Milne
