= Donald Kerr (disambiguation) =

Don Kerr or Donald Kerr may refer to:

- Donald Kerr (1939-2025), American politician
- Don Kerr, Canadian musician
- Donald M. Kerr (conservationist) (1946-2015), American conservationist
- Donald Kerr (poet) (1919-1942), Australian poet
- Donald A. Kerr (1859-1919), Australian minister
- Donald Kerr (actor), actor in The Murder in the Museum
- Don Kerr (motorcyclist), motorcyclist, see World records for fastest motorcycle ride around Australia
- Donny Kerr, American poker player, see 1996 World Series of Poker
- Donnie Kerr, one of the writers of Spitting Image
- Donnie Kerr, Scottish politician who ran in the 2012 Highland Council election
