= John Fulford =

John Fulford may refer to:

- John Fulford (English priest)
- John Fulford (Australian priest)
