= George Dove =

Australian Anglican priest

George Dove (19 April 1833 – 5 May 1914) was a long serving Anglican priest in Adelaide, South Australia.

== History ==
Dove was born at Ulverston Hall, Debenham, Suffolk, and was educated at Ipswich School. After a break of three years he entered Corpus Christi College, Cambridge and was ordained deacon by the Bishop of Norwich in 1856 and priest in 1857. After a curacy at Skirbeck near Boston, and three years at East Dereham, where he was the incumbent at St Michael's.

He left for Melbourne, Australia aboard Shakamaxon in November 1860, transferred to the steamer Balclutha and arrived in Adelaide on 25 February 1861 and was shortly required to act as curate of Trinity Church, Adelaide in place of Rev. James Farrell, which entailed taking over the duties of Colonial Chaplain. He served at St Mary's on the Sturt, 1861–1862, which included ministry to the congregations at St Jude's Church, Brighton and Christ Church, O'Halloran Hill, then in October 1882 left for St Andrew's Church, Walkerville, where he served for nearly 50 years.

During his incumbency at Walkerville, Dove

- was the first in the Adelaide diocese to introduce Hymns Ancient and Modern into the liturgy
- also took charge of St Paul's, Adelaide during the absence of Dean Russell 1869–1871
- was made Canon of St Peter's Cathedral, Adelaide in 1872
- organised the northern mission, which involved a horseback trek to Beltana
- in 1875 left for two years in England with his wife and children, during which time he preached in six Cathedrals including Westminster Abbey and York Minster, raising funds for the St. Peter's Cathedral building fund. Canon Poole acted at Walkerville in his absence.
- succeeded Archdeacon Twopeny as Archdeacon of the Flinders diocese, then was founding Archdeacon of Broughton diocese
- secured a peal of bells for the Walkerville church, unique in Adelaide

He retired in 1911, and was succeeded by Bishop Cecil Wilson. He was a great rose fancier, winning several prizes at floricultural exhibitions in Adelaide. He died on 5 May 1914, survived by his wife and three daughters, and his remains were interred in the North Road Cemetery.
