= Donald M. Kerr =

Donald M. Kerr may refer to:

- Donald Kerr (Donald MacLean Kerr, 1939–2025), American intelligence officer
- Donald M. Kerr (conservationist) (1946–2015), wildlife biologist and conservationist

== See Also ==
- Donald Kerr (disambiguation)
