= Donald Kerr (poet) =

Australian poet

Donald Beviss Kerr (27 June 1919 – 15 December 1942) was a South Australian poet, a founder of the magazine Angry Penguins.

== Biography ==
Kerr was born in North Adelaide, South Australia, the eldest son of Donald Kerr MM LLD (1893 – 30 January 1928), and Marjorie Jane Kerr, née Johns (1894–1968). He was a grandson of Donald Alexander Kerr (1859 – 5 July 1919), at one time headmaster of Pulteney Grammar School.

He was educated at St Peter's College, and studied English Language and Literature at the University of Adelaide 1937–1940, boarding at St Mark's College where he was active in college activities. He won the 1940 John Howard Clark Prize for literature.

He was editor of the university graduates' annual magazine Phoenix in 1939, and when its funding was withdrawn, founded the literary magazine Angry Penguins, (Note: In one issue of Angry Penguins, Max Harris credits Kerr as its founder.) one of its four original contributors, with (according to Professor Charles Jury) Max Harris, Paul Pfeiffer and Geoffrey Dutton.

Kerr enlisted in the RAAF in 1939 and was called up in December 1940, serving as navigator on supply flights. He was killed when his plane was shot down over Soputa airstrip, near Buna, Papua New Guinea.

Hassell Press published a collection of his poems, Death, Be Not Proud (Note: The title drawn from the poem by John Donne) in 1943.
