= Walter Henry Howard =

Walter Henry Howard (c. September 1858 – 7 August 1947) was a South Australian educator, priest, and historian, best known for his work on the west coast of South Australia's Eyre Peninsula.

== History ==
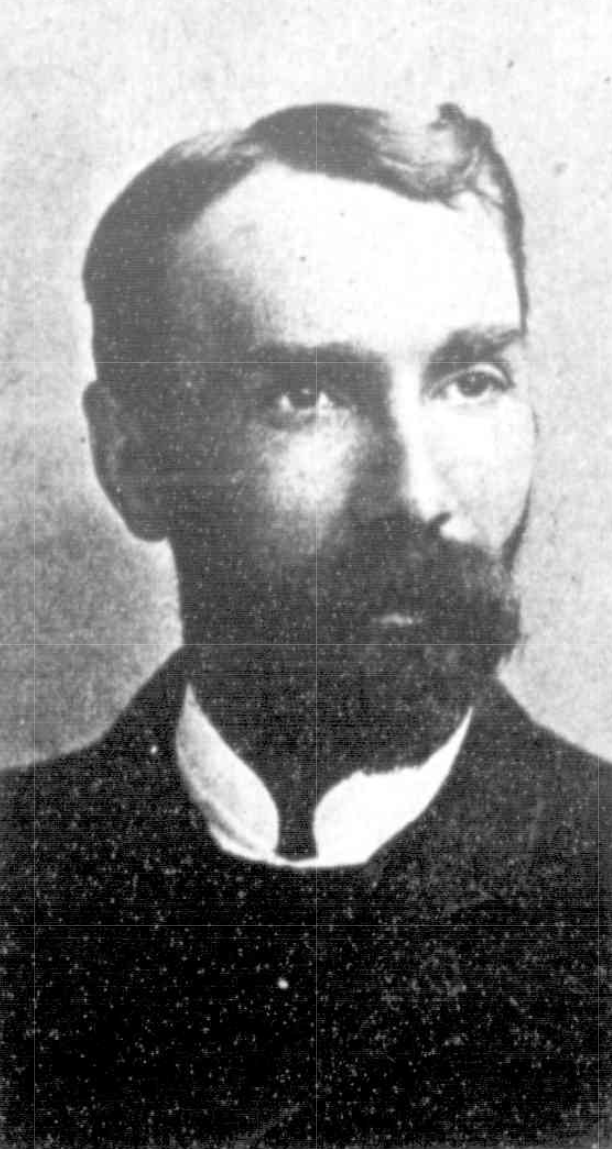
W. H. Howard

Howard was born in England, the youngest son of William Howard, of St Osyth, near Colchester. Little has been found of his early life except that he had been a teacher at a school approved by the London School Board, and at the choir school attached to St Mary's Cathedral, Edinburgh.

He emigrated to South Australia and was appointed headmaster of Pulteney Street School in mid-1884.

W. S. Moore retired as headmaster in April 1883 and the school corporation immediately began advertising for a replacement, but was still advertising a year later. Howard's appointment was announced in June 1884, so it is likely he had recently arrived in the colony.

While serving as headmaster, he was a member of the South Australian Militia, appointed lieutenant in 1889 He undertook studies leading to priesthood at St Barnabas' College and was ordained in 1897.

He resigned as headmaster in March 1898 and from 1898 to 1902 received an appointment as rector at Port Lincoln, with an attached mission district.

In 1904 Bishop Harmer praised the efforts Howard and Gordon Cuming (who later returned to England) put into re-establishing the church in previously neglected areas, and appointed Howard priest-in-charge of the Anglican West Coast Mission, stationed at Streaky Bay. He was, in addition, made rural dean of Eyre's Peninsula in 1908, a demanding position which entailed regular travel by horse and buggy across hard country, conducting services and sacraments in whatever hall or schoolroom was available, days or weeks away from his home and family. That same year, he was appointed to the Streaky Bay School Board of Advice.

In 1911 Bishop Thomas appointed him a canon of St Peter's Cathedral, a purely honorary position, following the death of Canon Robert Bennett Webb (1841–1911) of Clare, with Rev. E. C. W. H. Limbert (1877–1935) as his curate.

Thanks to his efforts, a mission hall was built at Murat Bay, and the old church at Streaky Bay, built in 1869, was replaced by a new Church of St Augustine of Hippo, of which Howard was the rector, on top of his role as rural dean.

In April 1916 he resigned those positions to remove to the Adelaide diocese, his wife and family having already made the move. In October 1916 Howard and fellow-Anglican S. T. C. Best, were appointed temporary chaplains to the First AIF.

Sometime around 1918 he was appointed rector of Port Augusta. In December 1920 he was admitted to Port Augusta Hospital, seriously ill, but Church law prevented his repatriation to Adelaide, so he resigned, and was replaced by Rev. W. J. Stringer (1882–1966).

He died at his home at Glen Osmond aged 88 years and 11 months. He had been head of Pulteney Street School for 14 years and in holy orders for 52, much of that time as a lonely pioneer in harsh country. An obituary concluded that he would be remembered "with affection and esteem" by "those who came under his spiritual influence and in the up-bringing of their families".

== Other interests ==
Howard was exposed to the principles of single tax in Henry George's book Progress and Poverty, which he was convinced would solve many economic and social problems. His book of essays, The Land Question and Christian Justice, expounded his own supporting arguments.

Howard was a Freemason, and served as W.M. of the Port Lincoln Masonic Lodge, No. 45, in 1902.

He retained a clear memory to the last, and in his final years compiled a history of his work on the West Coast, and a history of the Poonindie Mission, which appeared in the magazine of the Diocese of Willochra, a copy of which is held by the State Library of South Australia.

== Family ==
Howard married Henrietta Wiles (1860 – 1960) on 23 December 1885. Their children include

- Osyth Hilda Caroline Howard (1886–1978) married Frederick Arthur Doley of Wirrulla on 10 February 1927
- Osmond John Howard (1888–1983) student Roseworthy College; not married in SA
- Evelyn Annie Howard (1891–1980) married Edgar Arthur Snashall (died 1969? 21 September 1979?) of Clare in 1922
- (Harold) Hubert Howard (9 May 1893 – 1985) fought in France and Belgium, married Teresa Walker in 1925
- Una Mary Howard (1900 – 25 July 1996)
