= James Pollitt (priest) =

English missionary (1813–1881)

James Pollitt (3 April 1813 – 15 August 1881) was an English Anglican missionary to South America and pioneering minister in South Australia.

== History ==
Pollitt was born in Worsley in historic Lancashire, England. He was a son of John Pollitt.

He decided at an early age on the life of a missionary, and trained at the Church Missionary Society College, Islington. In 1834 he sailed for Jamaica, where he married and son Henry was born, either in 1837 or 1840. His health suffered, and in 1841 he returned to England, where he spent some time recuperating in the Channel Islands. After further preparation, including a course of medical studies at King's College Hospital, at the end of 1842 he embarked for British Guiana, where he was promptly ordained Deacon by Bishop Austin and sent up the Essequibo River with his wife and two sons to mission to the Carib Indians. While there he met Sir Robert Schomburgk and his brother Dr. Richard Schomburgk, later the curator of Adelaide Botanic Garden. After less than a year he was forced by ill health to return to England and spent some time recuperating on the Isle of Man. He was ordained a priest by Bishop Sumner, of Chester, and appointed assistant curate to the church of St. Paul's, Lindale, in Westmorland.

South Australia

Pollitt heard that Anglican ministers were urgently needed in the newly proclaimed colony of South Australia, and together with W. J. Woodcock, under the auspices of the Society for the Propagation of the Gospel in Foreign Parts embarked with his family on the Emu, arriving in Adelaide in May 1846. He was appointed the first minister of St. James's Church, Blakiston, where he served until late 1849, when he was appointed to Kooringa, which had suddenly become important for its proximity to the Burra Burra mines, and was replaced by the Rev. George C. Newenham. In 1854 he was elected first rector of St. Luke's Church in Whitmore Square. In 1864 he was unanimously elected to Christ Church, North Adelaide, where Archdeacon Woodcock, a fellow passenger on the Emu, had been officiating. Nevertheless, Pollitt remained at St. Luke's. In 1870 he spent fifteen months in England for the sake of his health and returned much recovered. His wife died in 1877 and he remarried in January 1880, and he resigned in June 1881, vacated the parsonage, fell ill and died shortly after.

The Rev. James Pollitt was an eloquent preacher of the Evangelical school, noted for his charity to the poor of all religions and greatly loved by those who knew him best. He was an effective and successful advocate for State aid until the Act which provided support to the Established Church was overturned by the Legislative Council. He was noted for his "low church" anti-ritualistic views, which brought him into conflict with the Synod and powerful "high church" Anglicans of Trinity Church.

== Family ==
Pollitt married Ellen Maria Williams Moate (c. 1809 – 16 April 1877) in 1835. She was a daughter of Robert Moate (1779–1825) and Mary Anne Moate, née Williams. Among their family were:

- The Rev. Henry Martyn Pollitt (1 November 1837 or 1840 – 5 December 1908) was born in Jamaica, educated at St Peter's College, Adelaide, and married Caroline Carleton (7 October 1840 – 13 November 1920) on 2 October 1866. He was later known as Canon Pollitt. She was a daughter of Caroline Carleton, the author of Song of Australia. Pollitt served as Inspector of Church Schools in the Diocese of Adelaide from 1885 to 1899, when he retired, to be replaced by Donald A. Kerr.

- Edith Marion Pollitt (1868–1953)
- Henry Carleton Pollitt (1869–1925) married Florence Hamilton Ayliffe (1872–1948) on 16 May 1917. He was a first officer on P & O liners.
- James Pollitt (16 July 1872 – ) moved to Western Australia.
- Mary Alice Carleton Pollitt (1874– ) married Francis Bentley Davison ( – ) on 6 December 1921.
- Winifred Amy Carleton "Winnie" Pollitt (1876 – 29 August 1942) was a student at the Advanced School for Girls.
- Cyril Arthur Pollitt (1878–1942) married Hermine Wanda Sobels, daughter of winemaker C. A. Sobels, in 1911. They had two daughters and two sons.
- Helen Carleton Pollitt (1880– ) was engaged to the Rev. Henry Stafford Needham, rector of Busselton, Western Australia, but broken off. Her brother James then assaulted Needham with a horsewhip.

- Arthur Greenway Pollitt (1 May 1842 – c. 26 January 1917) married Elizabeth Christian Chambers (c. 1850 – 6 August 1911) in 1878. He was a solicitor in Port Pirie. She was a granddaughter of Robert Cock and niece of James Cock. He was an alcoholic, and his wife died in a destitute home in Adelaide.

- Irene May Pollitt (1879 – 3 November 1946) married Henry Joseph Perkins ( – 9 March 1926) in 1901, lived in Port Pirie. They had three daughters and two sons.
- Franklin John Arthur Charles Pollitt (1885–1955) married Elaine Thompson ( – ) in 1906. They had a daughter and four sons.
- Robert Eldred Llewellyn Pollitt (1888– )
- Hector Elwyn Pollitt (1890–1951) married Elsie May Goble ( –1966) in 1916. They had a daughter and three sons.
- Alexander Gerald Pollitt (1894–1970) married Eva Alice Goble ( –1963) in 1930. They had six sons and one daughter.

- Winfrid Pollitt (c. 1845 – 25 April 1893) married Henrietta Susannah French Perry ( – ) in 1869. He was keeper of the Gladstone Gaol, then landlord of the Blythewood Hotel, Mitcham. Among their children were:

- Blanche Pollitt (1875 – )
- Winfrid Jervois Pollitt (1879 – 22 August 1902), died in Napier, New Zealand.
- Florence Cecilia Pollitt (1881– )
- Henry Walter Pollitt (1893– )

- Ellen Maria Pollitt (17 January 1847 – 5 July 1925) married William Hamilton Ayliffe (1844 – 20 July 1928) on 22 February 1870. He was the youngest son of Dr. George Ayliffe.
- Clement Pollitt (1854 – 30 December 1872) born in England.

He married again, to Cecile Seline Nagel (c. 1837 – 28 July 1902) on 8 January 1880. He died at his home, Sturt Street, Adelaide. She married again to Charles Comport Cobb (c. 1830 – 3 July 1899) on 16 January 1883.
