= Henry English Fulford =

British Diplomat

Henry English Fulford CMG (27 October 1859 – 15 May 1929), known as H. E. Fulford, was a British diplomat, who spent most of his career in China.

== Life and career ==
H.E. Fulford was born in Chepstow, Monmouthshire. His father, Rev. John Fulford, had been an Anglican priest in Australia (Adelaide and Melbourne). Soon after the boy's birth, the Fulford family returned to Australia, where Rev. Fulford (later, Rev. Canon Fulford) resumed his ecclesiastical career.

After graduating from the Melbourne Grammar School, Henry Fulford went to England, to acquire some business experience in London.

In 1880 H.E. Fulford joined the British Consular Service and was sent to work in China. In 1887, when he was a student interpreter at the British Consulate in Newchwang (today's Yingkou), he joined two British officers on leave from India – H. E. M. James of the Indian Civil Service and Francis Younghusband of the British Army – and went with them on a tour of Manchuria. As he was the only person of the three Brits who had a China background, he provided the British party with a language and cultural expertise.

Fulford served for a number of years in the British consulate in Newchwang. He became the consul there in 1899, and served in that position during the Boxer Uprising and the Russo-Japanese War, informing the British governments on the events as they developed. He was appointed CMG in the 1900 Birthday Honours. In 1906, he was appointed the British Consul General in Mukden (now, Shenyang). Later, he held a number of other consular posts throughout China. He served as a Consul General in Hankou (1911), acting Consul General in Shanghai (1913), and Consul General in Tianjin (1912–1917).

In 1917, Fulford retired and returned to Australia. On 15 May 1929, his daughter found him shot dead, aged 69, apparently in a suicide, in the bedroom of his Melbourne residence.
