= St Mary's on the Sturt =

Anglican church in St Marys, South Australia

Coordinates: 34°59′46″S 138°34′32″E

St Mary's on the Sturt is an Anglican church on South Road, St Marys, Adelaide, South Australia.

== History ==
The original St Mary's Anglican church was built of native timbers on donated land on the Onkaparinga Road midway between the Sturt and Brownhill Creek crossings. The first service held there was conducted on 4 July 1841 by Rev. C. B. Howard, then took alternate Sundays with James Farrell.

It has been called the second Anglican church in the colony, the first being Trinity Church in 1836. St John's church on Halifax Street, another contender for second place, however, did not hold its first service until 24 October 1841.

The church was built by voluntary labour, of stringybark (possibly Eucalyptus obliqua or E. baxteri) timber, on land donated by John Wickham Daw (c. 1797–1872), and all materials and furnishings were paid for by voluntary contributions, including by early settler Capt. Ray Boucaut of the nearby property "Sarnia". The name was chosen by Daw in recognition of his home parish St Mary Abbots of Kensington. England.

This structure was always intended to be temporary, and the foundation stone for a new building was laid at the present site, some 200 metres south of the original, on 27 October 1846 by Miss Fanny Conway. The new building, designed by Moses Garlick (c. 1784–1859), father of architect Daniel Garlick, and built of stone donated by the Ayliffe family, was completed and on 12 September 1847 the first service was conducted by Rev. James Farrell and Rev. W. J. Woodcock. The church was consecrated by Bishop Short on 11 March 1849. That same year transepts, chancel, bell tower (later raised to a height of 36 feet (11 m)), vestry and porch were added. A vicarage was completed around the same time.

The old building served as a schoolroom for many years and was demolished in 1928.

The village of St Mary's on the Sturt, which became the Adelaide suburb of St Marys was named after the church.

The church, its graveyard and its gates were listed on the South Australian Heritage Register on 14 August 1986 and on the now-defunct Register of the National Estate on 15 May 1990.

== Ministers ==
For most of the history of the church, the incumbent also had charge of Christ Church, O'Halloran Hill and also St. Judes, Brighton from around 1855–1865

- W. J. Woodcock c. 1847
- J. Fulford 1847–1851
- John W. Schoales 1851–1854
- Robert Strong 1854–1856
- Astley Cooper 1857–1860; left for Yankalilla district
- George Dove 1861–1862; left for Walkerville, where he served for nearly 50 years, made Archdeacon
- Rev. W. Dacres Williams 1863–1867; died at St Mary's on 5 March 1867
- Dr Richard Francis Burton (c. 1811 – 24 February 1874) 1867
- Alfred Honner 1869–1872
- J. Leslie Smith 1872–1874
- John Bach 1875–1879 left for Tasmania after successfully suing a parishioner for libel
- William George Robinson (c. 1853 – 1 December 1879) 1879
- F. T. Whitington 1880–1882, later Archdeacon of Hobart
- C. H. Young 1882–1884
- William Samuel Moore 1884–1900 buried in the churchyard
- T. Worthington 1900–1903 returned to England
- King William Pobjoy (c. 1853 – 1 December 1931) 1903–1919
- C. J. Whitfield 1919–1920
- S. T. Longman 1920–1925 returned to England
- S. J. Bloyd 1925–1932, left for Blakiston
- Thomas Hopkins 1932–1939
- Andrew G. Hay 1940–

== Churchyard ==
The first burial at St Mary's was of James Penn (d. 17 November 1847), by his son-in-law, Capt. Ray Boucaut, who established a vault where many Bocault family members have been interred, including his son, Sir James Penn Boucaut in 1916.

Other notables who have been interred at St Mary's include:

- Eustace Reveley Mitford
- Rev. William Samuel Moore (1830–1901)
