= John Fulford (Australian priest) =

John Fulford (c. 1822 – 24 March 1905) was an Anglican priest in Australia.

== History ==
Fulford emigrated to South Australia in 1847 with Bishop Short and Rev. M. B. Hale aboard Derwent, and was ordained deacon at Trinity Church in 1848.

He was put in charge of St Mary's on the Sturt in 1848. He also served Christ Church, O'Halloran Hill. He served the Blakiston church at Balhannah 1851–1858, and was also responsible for St. Mark's, Woodside.

He married Sarah Marshall (c. 1822 – 30 August 1899) in 1852, had five children, then returned to England, where son Harry English Fulford was born.

He returned to Australia in 1863, where he had charge (as locum tenens) of Christ Church, South Yarra in Victoria.

He had charge of St Matthew's Prahran.

He returned to England 1874–1984.
