= Harry Blinman =

Australian cricketer and public servant

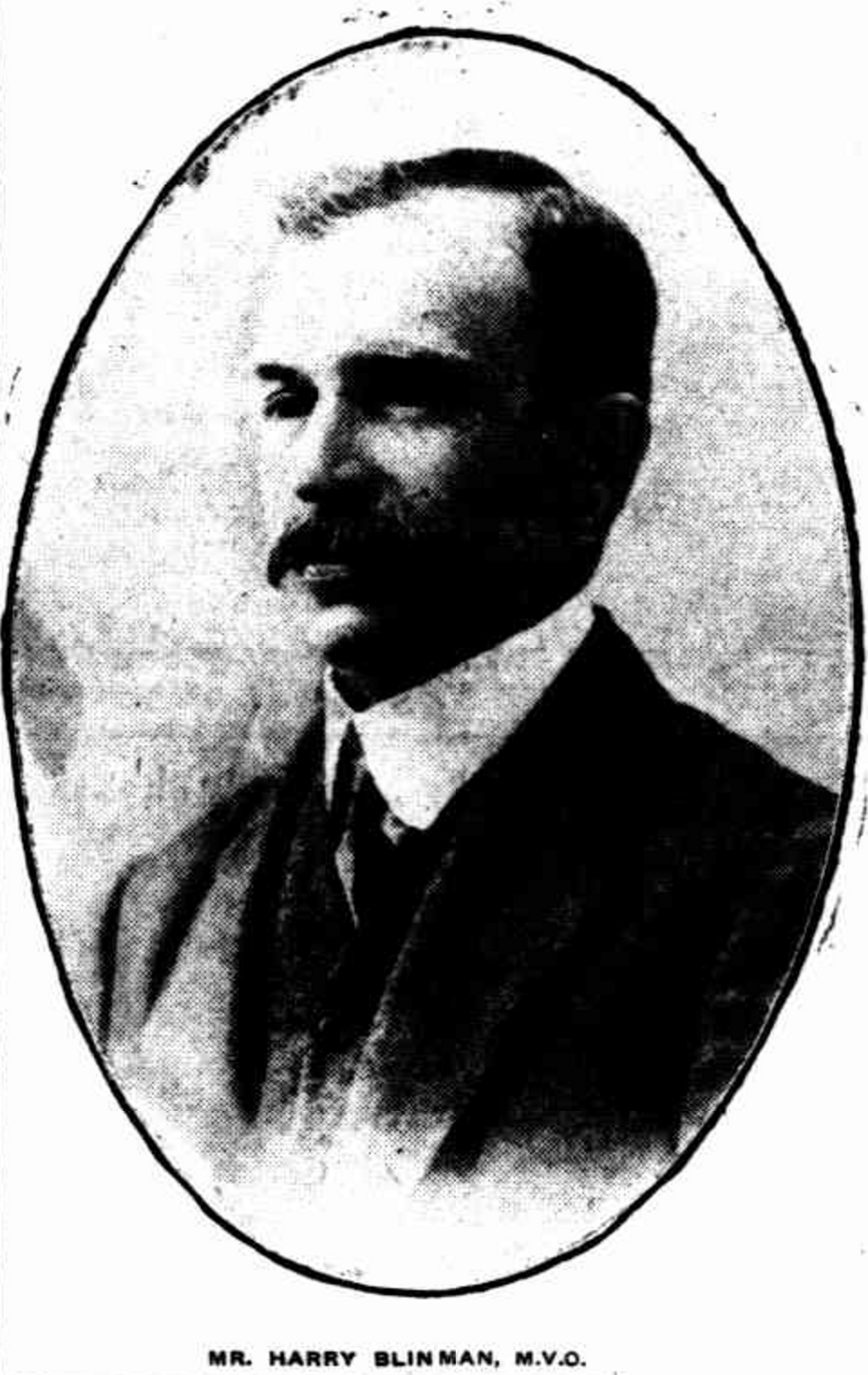

Personal information
- Full name: Harry Blinman
- Born: 30 December 1861; Adelaide, South Australia
- Died: 23 July 1950 (aged 88); Adelaide, South Australia
- Batting: Right-handed
- Role: Batsman

Domestic team information
- Years: Team
- 1880/81–1895/96: South Australia

Career statistics
Competition	First-class
Matches	23
Runs scored	663
Batting average	20.09
100s/50s	0/3
Top score	73*
Catches/stumpings	16/–
- Source: Cricinfo, 3 September 2015

Harry Blinman MVO, ISO (30 December 1861 – 23 July 1950) was an Australian cricket player, cricket administrator, and senior public servant in South Australia.

Born in Adelaide, Blinman was educated at Pulteney Grammar School under Headmaster W.S. Moore.

A right-handed batsman, Blinman played 23 first-class cricket matches for South Australia between 1881 and 1895. His highest score was 73 not out when he was South Australia's top-scorer against New South Wales in December 1890. He scored 23 and 30 when South Australia defeated New South Wales in the inaugural Sheffield Shield match in December 1892. He also played Australian rules football for Norwood Football Club in the South Australian Football Association (SAFA).

Blinman had a long career as a senior public servant in South Australia, for which he was awarded membership of the Royal Victorian Order in 1920. He was the Premier's secretary and Clerk of the Executive Council from 1916 until his retirement in 1931. He was the state organiser for the visits of the Prince of Wales in 1920 and the Duke and Duchess of York in 1927. He was awarded the Imperial Service Order in 1928.

Blinman served on the South Australian Cricket Association (SACA) from 1900 until 1950. He was also a member of the Australian Cricket Board of Control from 1907 to 1919. He was a trustee of the SACA from 1924, and president from 1940 until his death in 1950.

He died at his home in East Terrace, Adelaide, where he had lived for 68 years, on 23 July 1950, aged 88. He was a bachelor.
