= Alexander Russell (priest) =

Alexander Rutherford Russell (1825 – 20 May 1886) was Dean of Adelaide from 1866 until his death in 1886.

He was born in Perthshire, educated at Trinity College Dublin, and ordained in 1851.

He was promoted from St Andrew's Church, Walkerville in March 1855 to rector of St John's Church, Adelaide in November 1859. He founded St Paul's Church, Adelaide on Pulteney Street in 1860, and succeeded James Farrell as Dean of Adelaide in 1869. He continued to serve at St Paul's until his death in 1886.

He was editor of the short-lived (1857–1858) Educational Journal, official organ of the "Preceptors' Society".

== Recognition ==
Bishop Nutter Thomas, in delivering a eulogy "Well done, good and faithful servant" for Canon Sunter of St Paul's Church, made reference to his predecessor Russell as "poet and preacher".

== Bibliography ==
- Fred T. Whitington Some words in memory of Alexander Russell, Dean of Adelaide pub. W. K. Thomas, Adelaide, 1886

Religious titles
Preceded by James Farrell	Dean of Adelaide; 1866–1886	Succeeded by Charles Marryat
