= State aid for libraries =

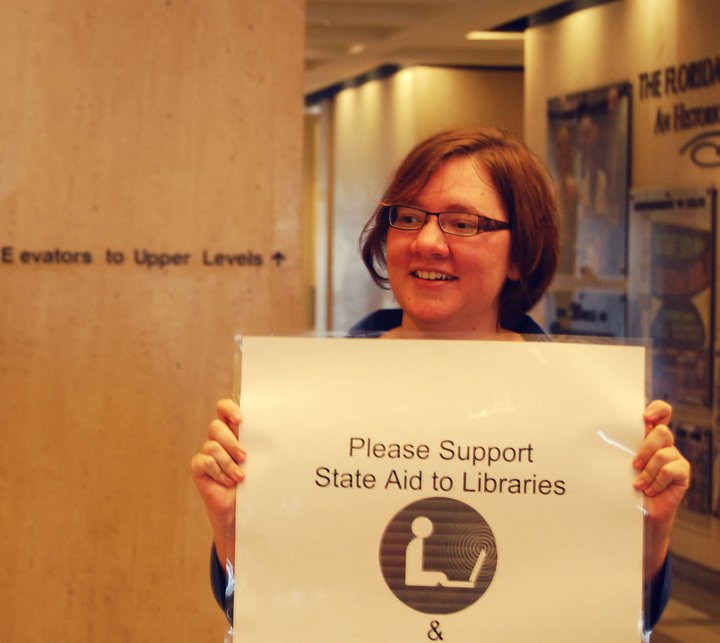
A librarian advocates for state aid

State aid for libraries (also known as state aid for public libraries, state aid, direct aid or state funding) is funding provided to public libraries by state governments in the United States. State aid is typically divided among all libraries in a state in the form of block grants. Each eligible library receives a percentage of state aid based on the library's budget, income and population served. State aid supplements local library budgets, and is particularly important for rural libraries and libraries supported by a small tax base. Other reasons states offer aid to libraries are to promote resource sharing among libraries; to encourage cities to establish and support libraries; and to establish minimum standards for libraries. State aid is combined with other forms of library funding—including federal aid, funding by local governments and private philanthropy—to provide money for library books, staff and information technology. Other forms of aid may be used to fund library construction and remodeling.

In order to qualify for federal assistance for libraries, states must provide a certain level of state aid. This is called "maintenance of effort." For example, in order to maintain access to federal technology grants, Florida must provide its libraries with at least $21.2 million a year in state aid. State funding must be re-authorized every year by state legislatures.

Most states offer aid to libraries. However, state aid has recently become more politically contentious. Critics of state funding argue that local libraries should be funded with local money. In 2012, the state of Louisiana eliminated state aid. In a statement, the governor’s chief budget aide said that “in tight budget times, we prioritized funding for health care and education. Operations such as local libraries can be supported with local, not state dollars.” Several other states have also cut state aid in recent years. In 2009, 41% of states reported declining state funding for libraries. The decline in funding has been most significant in the Southeast.
