= R. C. Mitton =

English born, South Australian educator

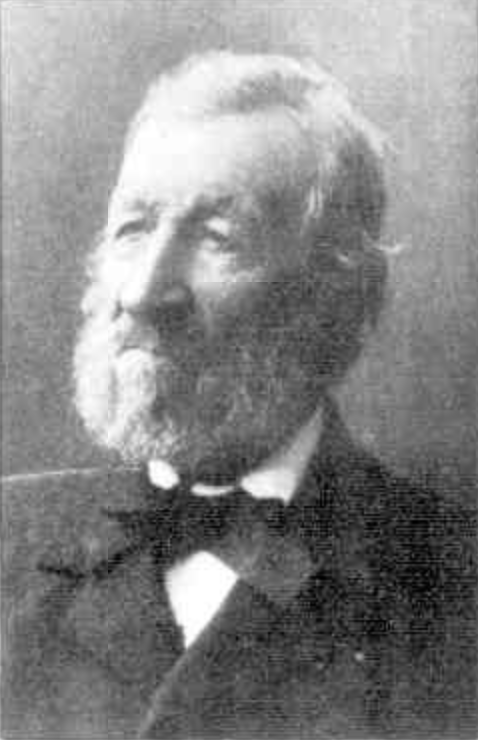

Robert Coales Mitton (4 February 1823 – 30 August 1913) was an English-born educator in South Australia, headmaster of various state and private schools.

== History ==
Mitton was born in Wellingborough, Northamptonshire, England, a son of John Edward Mitton (1785–1854) and Elizabeth Mitton née Coales (1788–1854). He trained as a teacher at the Borough Road College of the British and Foreign School Society, in London, and in 1847 was appointed head master of the school at Bideford, Devonshire, one of a series of "British Schools" for non-sectarian education of the poor, in competition with the Church of England's National Schools.

After two years at Bideford, he married Miss Benson in the Baptist Chapel at Biggleswade, her home town, and three weeks later they were on their way to South Australia, along with his parents, aboard the ship Albemarle, 704 tons, J. F. Trivet, master, arriving at Port Adelaide on 16 March 1852. They expected to be greeted by Mitton's brothers Josiah and Edward, who had emigrated earlier, but they were away in the goldfields of Victoria with thousands of others, leaving the streets empty of healthy men; his sister and her husband had left for Western Australia. Mitton's brothers returned to Adelaide in July 1852, having met with some success, and when they left again for Victoria in September, Mitton decided to accompany them on the long trek. They remained on the goldfields for about five months, and when Mitton returned to South Australia in March, 1853, he opened a school at Bowden, near the railway station. The school proved popular, but in 1854 Mitton was offered the headmastership of the Pulteney Street school, the largest and most important Board of Education establishment at the time.

Mitton was active in founding a Preceptors' Association, in association with T. Caterer, W. H. Mudie, J. Whinham, J. Bath, L. S. Burton, Inspector J. Hosking, T. J. King, John Martin, and others; Mitton became its first secretary and supported the monthly Educational Journal, edited by Dean A. R. Russell, devoted to promotion of national education. The journal advocated competitive examinations, establishment of a teachers' college and grading of teachers, and the systematic inspection of schools. The magazine failed amid a barrage of criticism and ridicule, and the Association disbanded, but Mitton later had the satisfaction of seeing State education adopting many of their proposals.

Mitton left Pulteney Street School in 1857, establishing a school in Waymouth Street, which he ran for several years. In 1866 he moved the school to premises in Stephens Place, previously occupied by Adelaide Educational Institution, naming it Rundle Street Grammar. In 1868 he was joined by W. J. Anderson, (Note: Welwood James Anderson (c. 1842 – 7 May 1915) [often Wellwood; Willwood in BDM] was born in England, grew up in Jamaica, was educated at King's College, London, and Cambridge University. He came to South Australia in 1864 with an introduction to Bishop Short. He stayed at Burra, where he married Sarah Ann Lawlor (died 1913) in 1866; they had three sons and four daughters. After Mitton's school he taught at, or took charge of, Departmental schools at North Adelaide, Nairne, Two Wells and O. B. Flat. He was known as a poet, linguist and raconteur. He died in Port Pirie.) running the school together.

In 1872, he joined the State Education Department, conducting the schools at Riverton and Glenelg, 1872–1875 and the new schools on Whitmore Square, 1877–1882 Grote Street and Magill –1892.

He retired in 1892, but remained vitally interested in State education, giving advice to Premier Boucaut and parliament on formulation of the new Education Act and suggested means by which teachers' qualifications under the old Education Board would be recognised without passing through the Training College.

=== Other interests ===
Mitton was a longtime subscriber to The South Australian Register, and was a frequent contributor to its columns. He campaigned against a public memorial to Charles Kingston, arguing that his unconventional private life outweighed any of his undoubted public achievements. His stated opinions were controversial.

== Family ==
Mitton had three brothers and one sister in South Australia: According to shipping reports, Edward Mitten [sic], Eliza Mitten [sic] and Josiah Mitton arrived in Statesman (Captain Lane) in February 1850.

- John Edward Mitton (1829 – 24 June 1904) married Ellen Shearing (1830–1905) in 1853. Ellen arrived March 1839 aboard Buckinghamshire. They had a bakery in Hindmarsh.
- Eliza Ann Mitton (31 January 1825 – 17 November 1913), who in 1851 married George Burnell, photographer, wool scourer and inventor, associated with Peacock and Son.
- Josiah Mitton (20 November 1826 – 14 May 1918) trained as baker with brother, ran grocery store on Port Road, Hindmarsh. He was mayor of Hindmarsh 1878–1880.

Mitton and his wife, and his mother and father, John Edward Mitton (1785–1854) and Elizabeth Mitton née Coales (1788–1854), arrived next, aboard Albemarle in March 1852.

- Robert Coales Mitton (4 February 1823 – 30 August 1913) married Mary Ann Benson (1827–1907). Their children include:

- Mary Deodata Mitton (1856–1935)
- Lucy Emma Theodosia Mitton (1857–1943)
- William Deodatus Mitton (1861–1907)
- Robert Theodore Mitton (1863–1941)
- Ernest Josiah Mitton (1864–1949)
- Charles Benson Mitton (1865–1944)
- Victoria Alice Mitton (1868–1948)
- Victor Albert Mitton (1869–1928)
- Ethel Alberta Mitton (1872–1949)

- William Smith Mitton (c. 1832 – 17 June 1901) married Mary Elizabeth Norman (6 May 1841 – 19 April 1930) in 1861. The youngest son, details of his arrival have not yet been found. Their children include:

- Frank Harold Mitton (1873 – 3 January 1934), of Largs Bay, married Sophia Elizabeth Lawrence in 1897.
- Ernest Gladstone Mitton (1875 – 22 October 1921), teacher, pioneer of Cobdogla and Berri
- Ewart Wilfred Mitton (c. 1878 – 23 September 1953) was mayor of Henley and Grange. His son Ronald Gladstone Mitton was a 1927 Rhodes scholar.
