= W. J. Woodcock =

Anglican priest in Australia

William John Woodcock (c. 1808 – 25 May 1868), generally referred to as W. J. Woodcock or John Woodcock, was an Anglican priest remembered as the first curate of Christ Church, North Adelaide in South Australia.

== History ==
Woodcock was born in England, and was ordained in 1832. He studied at the Church of England Missionary College for missionary work, in pursuit of which he was, under the auspices of the Society for the Propagation of the Gospel, in India at the Tinivelley Mission from 1835 to 1837, when ill-health forced him to return to England, where he married. Later that year he was sent to Jamaica, where he remained until 1840, when again he was forced by poor health to repatriate.

He spent a few months as curate of Kendal, then ministered at Witherslack, before migrating with his wife and five children to the young colony of South Australia on the barque Emu, accompanied by Rev. James Pollitt and his family, arriving in May 1846 with very flattering testimonials from Colonel Gawler. The first Sunday in Adelaide he preached a well-received sermon at Trinity Church, and was shortly appointed to St. John's church, where he remained for around three years. He preached the evening service of the consecration of Trinity Church on 30 July 1848 and served at St Mary's on the Sturt for a few months in 1847 in addition to his duties at St John's.

The foundation stone of Christ Church, North Adelaide was laid on 1 June 1848, and Woodcock was appointed to the church in May 1849, Matthew B. Hale, Archdeacon of Adelaide, being appointed to St. John's in his place. The church was opened and consecrated on 20 December 1849, and there Woodcock served for the rest of his life.

He was instituted into the office of Archdeacon of Adelaide on 20 January 1857 when Rev. M. B. Hale was appointed Bishop of Perth. With this appointment he became ex officio a Governor of St. Peter's College, and one of the Attorneys for the Society for the Propagation of the Gospel in Adelaide, as well as Examiner of prospective deacons and priests.

He left for England in November 1865, in the hope of a year's break restoring his health, returning aboard City of Adelaide in October 1866, but hopes of a recovery were short-lived, and he died on 25 May 1868. His remains were interred in the North Adelaide Cemetery alongside those of his daughter, Sophia Cussens.

Mrs Woodcock died at her home on Jeffcott Street on 28 May 1902.

== Family ==
(William) John Woodcock (3 November 1808 – 25 May 1868) married Mary Carter (10 May 1814 – 28 May 1902) at Chelmsford, Essex, in 1837. Their children included:

- Sophia Carter Woodcock (c. 1839 – 30 July 1863) married Robert Cussen (c. 1830 – 10 July 1913) in 1861. He married again, to Meliora Woodforde on 10 January 1872.
- Elizabeth Woodcock (c. November 1840 – 1 May 1848)
- Emma Jane Jackson Woodcock (c. 1842 – 18 December 1882 in England) married Rev. William Withers Ewbank (c. 1832 – 18 September 1873) on 1 May 1862
- Mary Ellen Woodcock (c. 1843 – 20 November 1869)
- Augusta Harridge Woodcock (c. 1845 – 2 August 1867) married Charles D'Oyly Cooper (c. 1839 – 19 July 1866) on 25 April 1865
- Fanny Louisa Woodcock (1 February 1852 – 17 July 1876) married Dr. Edmond Lewis Archer (c. 1849 – January 1941) on 20 April 1875. He married again, to Helen Philpott on 5 February 1901. They returned to England in 1909.
- James Farrell Woodcock (1858 – 4 February 1871)

Mrs Woodcock, Mrs. Ewbank, Mrs. Worsnop and others left for London per Rodney in March 1879.
