= State aid (Australia) =

State aid, in Australia, refers to subsidies by governments to independent (mostly church) schools. The term is somewhat misleading, as such aid derives mostly from the Commonwealth of Australia, while education is chiefly the responsibility of individual states.

Impetus for the subsidy came from the Catholic Church, which had its own reasons for providing education "identical, if even more poverty-stricken, with the public schools" for the children of its adherents, but resulted in a significant saving to the public purse. Meanwhile, argued Archbishop Mannix, taxes paid by Catholic parents were disproportionately used to educate children of non-Catholics. He urged Catholic voters to forget party loyalty and support whichever offered more in support of their schools.
