= William Samuel Moore =

Irish-born headmaster

William Samuel Moore (12 July 1830 – 17 July 1901) was an Irish-born engineer who had a career as headmaster and Anglican priest in Adelaide, South Australia.

== History ==
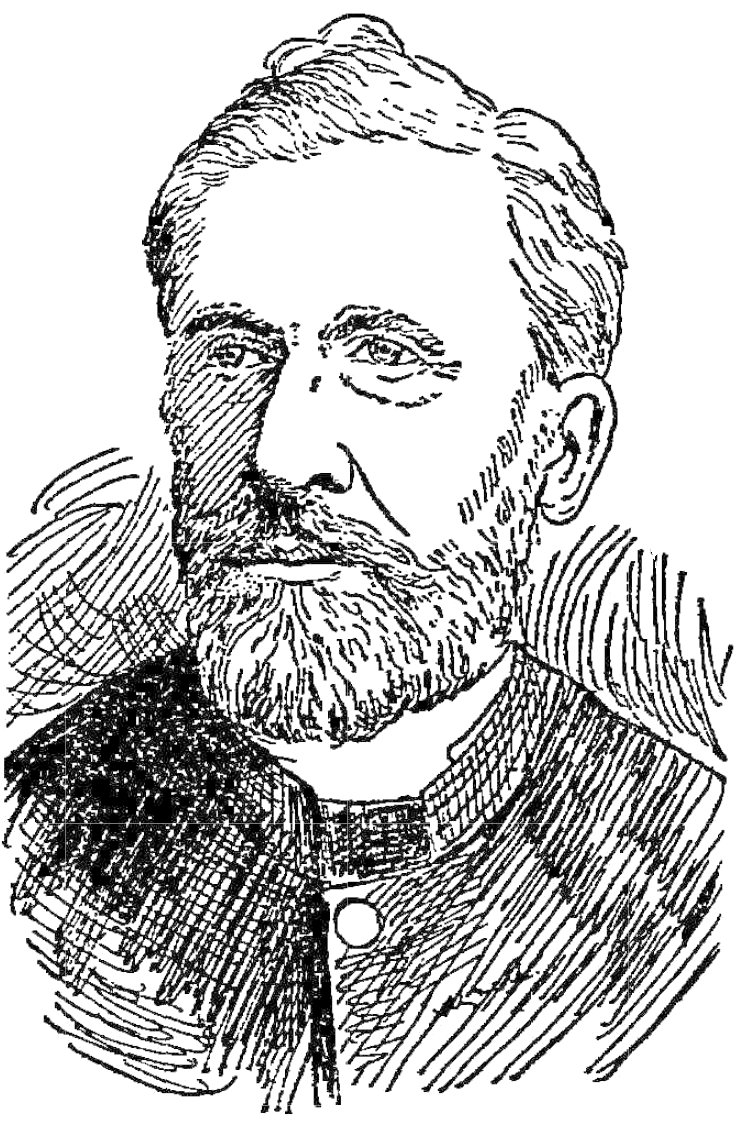
W. S. Moore

Moore was born in Ireland and trained for a career as a civil engineer. He left for South Australia in 1861 and, not finding work in his chosen profession, took a temporary position as headmaster of the Pulteney Street School, which was later made permanent. When Moore took the position, the school had 12 pupils, the number growing during his incumbency to around 300. He retired in 1883, and on 22 February 1883 was honoured at a presentation ceremony.

=== Religious ===
Moore took holy orders in 1880 and in 1881 was enrolled as an officiating minister under the Marriage Act.

While headmaster of Pulteney Street School, he also served as curate of St Bartholomew's Church, Norwood, 1880–1881 and St John's Church, Adelaide 1881–1884. From 1884 to 1900 he was rector of St Mary's, South Road, coupled with oversight of Christ Church, O'Halloran Hill, following the resignation of Rev. C. H. Young. Over that period, he was similarly attached to St. George's Church, Goodwood.

== Death and recognition ==
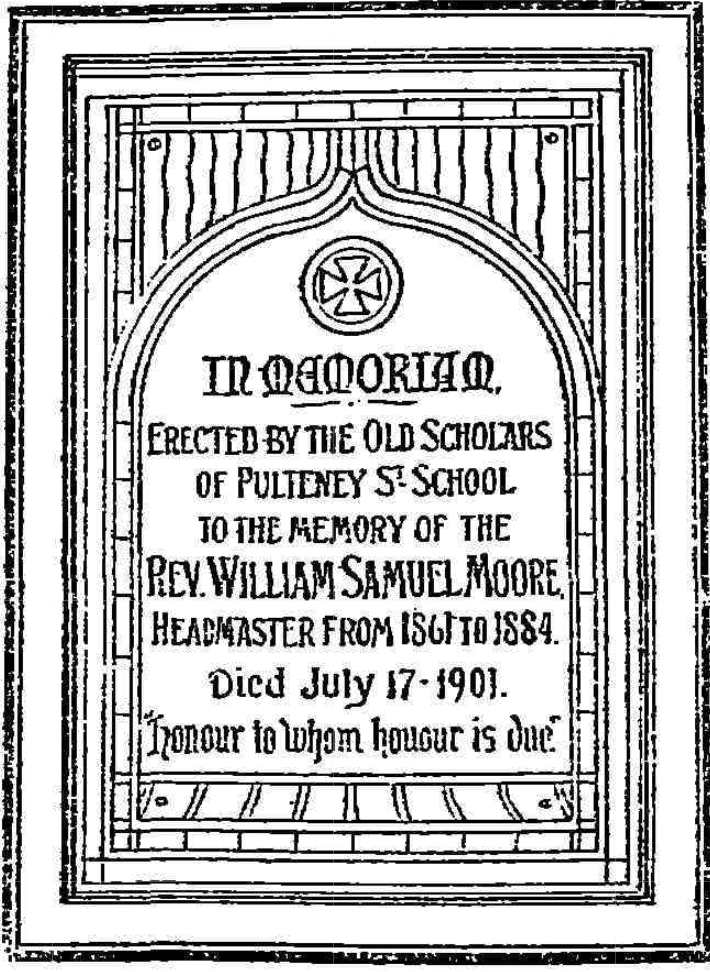
Moore memorial plaque

He was afflicted with partial paralysis on 11 June 1900 and died at his home in Millswood on 17 July 1901. His remains were buried in St. Mary's churchyard, South Road.

On 11 May 1902 a brass plaque was unveiled at the Pulteney Street School in recognition of his long service. The inscription read:

In Memorian
Erected by the Old Scholars
of Pulteney St School
to the memory of the
Rev. William Samuel Moore.
Headmaster from 1861 to 1884.
Died July 17, 1901.
"Honour to whom honour is due."

One of the four houses of Pulteney Grammar School is named "Moore-Sunter", in recognition of his long service as head master of the college, coupled with that of James Sunter.

== Family ==
Moore had two children:

- William Alfred Moore (1865 – 8 November 1912) was curate at St Luke's Church, Adelaide 1893–1895, followed by Mt Gambier, then St Mary's, South Road with his father. Later postings include Melrose, Blakiston, Woodside, Coromandel Valley and Clarendon. He operated Glenelg Grammar School around 1905. He married (Kate) Leslie Frances Roe on 10 February 1898.
- Marcella Grace Moore (1868 – 27 October 1923) married George Thomas Ragless on 11 November 1890.
