= James Pollitt =

English cricketer

Personal information
- Full name: James Peter Pollitt

Domestic team information
- Years: Team
- 1851: Marylebone Cricket Club
- 1850–1851: Middlesex
- 1850: Hampshire

Career statistics
Competition	FC
Matches	9
Runs scored	83
Batting average	5.92
100s/50s	–/–
Top score	23
Balls bowled	?
Wickets	5
Bowling average	?
5 wickets in innings	–
10 wickets in match	–
Best bowling	3/?
Catches/stumpings	2/–
- Source: Cricinfo, 29 April 2010

James Peter Pollitt (born c. 1826 at St Leonards-on-Sea, Sussex; died in 1860 at Brighton, Sussex) was an English cricketer.

Pollitt made his first-class debut for the North in 1847 against the Marylebone Cricket Club. In 1849, he played a single first-class match for the Fast Bowlers against the Slow Bowlers; this match indicates that Pollitt was a fast bowler of some nature.

In 1850, he made his debut for a Middlesex side in a County match against Surrey. Pollitt played one further match for Middlesex against the Marylebone Cricket Club in 1851.

In 1850, he played a single first-class match for a Hampshire team against an All England Eleven. In 1851, Pollitt made his debut for the Marylebone Cricket Club against Sussex. He made 2 further appearances for the club Cambridge University and Sussex.

Pollitt also played an additional first-class match for Marylebone Cricket Club and Metropolitan Clubs against an All England Eleven in 1850. From 1851 to 1853, he also stood as an Umpire in 4 first-class matches.

Pollitt died in 1860 at Brighton, Sussex.
