= Pulteney Grammar School =

Independent school in Adelaide, Australia

Location
- Adelaide, South Australia; 34°56′5″S 138°36′9″E

Information
- Type: Independent, co-educational day school
- Motto: O Prosper Thou Our Handiwork
- Denomination: Anglican
- Established: 1847; 179 years ago
- Chairman: Diana Newcombe
- Principal: Greg Atterton
- Employees: 149 (full-time)
- Enrolment: 894 (R–12), 56% boys, in 2022
- Houses: Bleby Howard; Cawthorne Nicholls; Kennion Miller; Moore Sunter
- Colours: Navy blue, white and gold
- Slogan: Where passions prosper
- Affiliation: Sports Association for Adelaide Schools; Independent Girls Schools Sports Association
- Website: www.pulteney.sa.edu.au

Pulteney Grammar School is an independent, Anglican, co-educational day school. Founded in 1847 by members of the Anglican Church, it is the second oldest independent school in South Australia. It is located on South Terrace in Adelaide.

== Founding ==
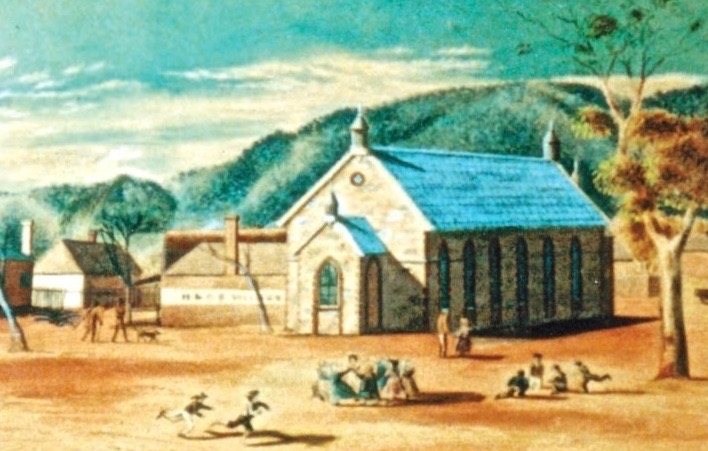
Pulteney Street School soon after its completion in 1848

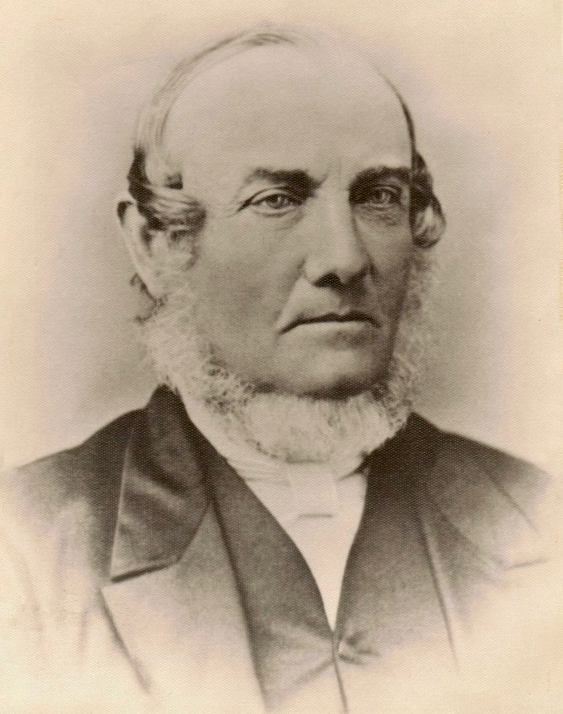
Revd Edmund Miller, the school's first headmaster, 1847–1850

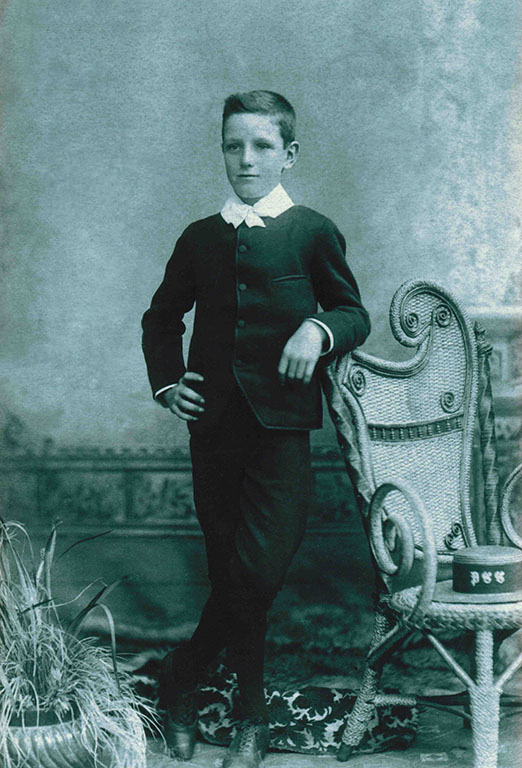
Herbert Hynes in the uniform of Pulteney Street School, about 1885

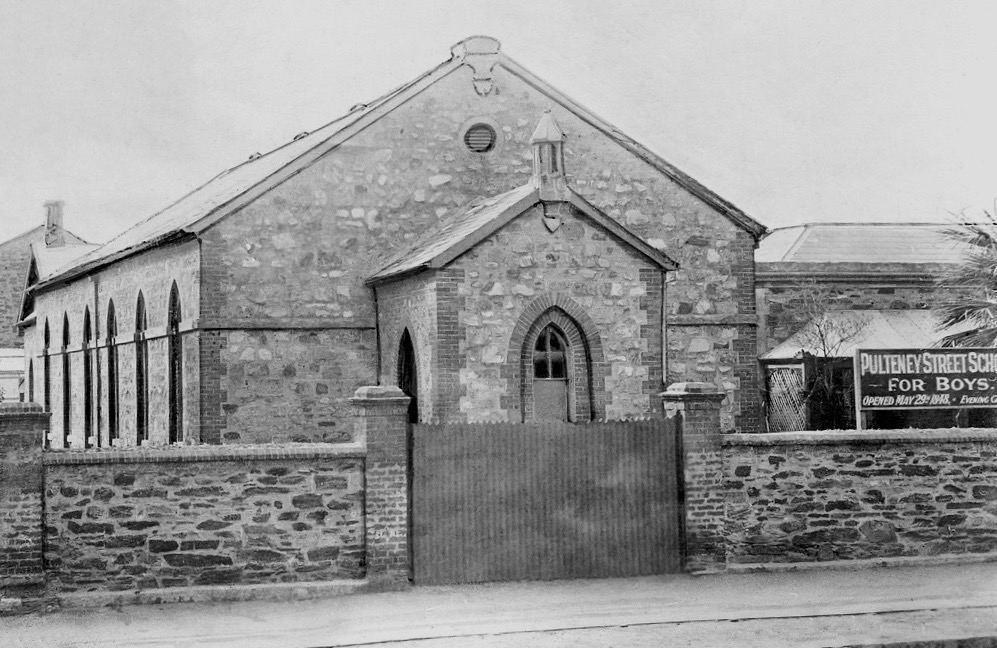
Pulteney Street School, pictured in 1919 before the premises were compulsorily acquired by the Australian Government

In May 1847, some citizens of Adelaide met to discuss the establishment of a new school in the city. Twelve months later, on 29 May 1848, Pulteney Street School was opened at a newly constructed 30 by 60 feet (9 by 18 m) building at the corner of Pulteney and Flinders streets. Although established in the Anglican tradition, which continues to this day, it provided from the beginning an education for students of all religious denominations.

Operating 10 months after St Peter's College was founded, the Pulteney Street School was aimed at a broader demographic, reflected in a monthly charge of 2 shillings and 6 pence for each pupil, considered to be "a rate which the poorest can surely afford to pay for the education of their children". The school had 50 pupils by the end of its first week and 270 by Christmas; within two years the average attendance had reached 350. From an early stage, technical subjects were taught to prepare boys for a trade. The senior class had a wide syllabus: writing, arithmetic, grammar, geography, mapping, linear drawing, mental arithmetic, geometry, dictation, spelling, reading, history, and "the prophecies". It advertised, four years later, that "The children are taught a superior commercial education, and have the use of the globes and maps. The girls are taught needlework, &c., and are separated from the boys' school. The pupils' fee is three shillings per month, paid in advance, with all materials found."

The inaugural headmaster, the Reverend Edmund King Miller, served in very difficult circumstances: when about 100 children had been admitted he applied to the trustees for an assistant, a request that was refused on the ground that there was a debt on the building they wished to liquidate. Emma Mitchell joined later in the year, mainly to take charge of the separate education of girls; but eventually an assistant for Miller, a William Pepper, was engaged. Miller remained on relatively poor terms with his trustees, largely owing to their failure to recognise the magnitude of the workload that fell on him, including his church work. He resigned in 1850.

In 1852 the school became Pulteney Street Central Schools, when its trustees accepted the curriculum, inspections and examinations of the Board of Education, and its teachers' salaries were supplemented by the State. Miller was succeeded by several headmasters of shorter duration (W. A. Cawthorne 1852–1855; R. C. Mitton 1855–1857 for example), and between appointments the school operated for several years without one. Coincident with the appointment of Cawthorne, a Miss Bridgeman was made governess of the girls' school. In 1853 she was replaced by Miss (Grace) Light.

In 1855 a great drift away from government schools took place, perhaps associated with the exodus to the Victorian goldfields and consequent economic downturn in Adelaide. After the December 1856 examinations, the school went into suspension following a mass removal from State schools of boys seeking paid employment. This coincided with the Legislative Council cutting funds for teachers' stipends. The girls' school closed around this time; in 1858 Light founded her own school in the Trinity Church schoolroom. It has been asserted that the school was renamed "Pulteney Street Central School" in the period when only the boys' school was operating.

In 1860 St Paul's Church was built in the school grounds, closer to the street corner.

In late 1862, under the new headmaster William Samuel Moore, (Note: According to one report, the school was from 1861 to 1884 known as "Moore's School".) the school was reestablished as "Pulteney Street Central Schools", with classes for girls, and in the 1870s, 74 girls were enrolled out of a total of 270. But female enrolments again ceased in 1884, when its name reverted to "Pulteney Street School". It did not again become co-educational until 1999.

The longer standing headmasters – William Samuel Moore (1862–1883 – 20 years in office), William Percival Nicholls (41 years) and W. R. Ray (26 years) – led Pulteney as it became a highly regarded educational institution, comparable to Scotch College, Prince Alfred College, and St Peter's College.

== 20th century ==
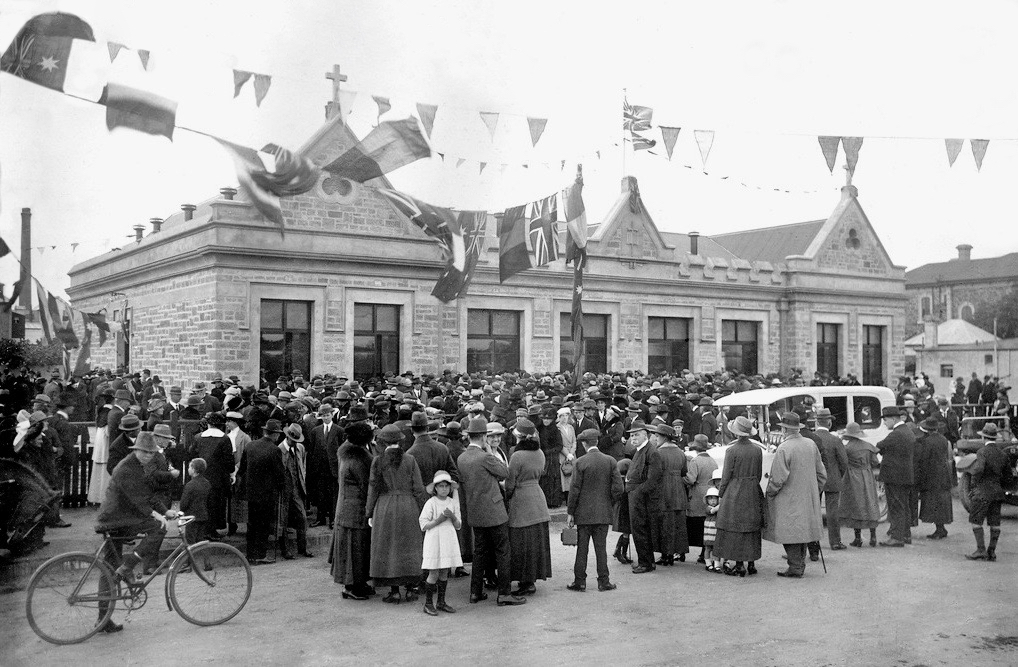
Opening of the new school on South Terrace, renamed as Pulteney Grammar School, in 1921. The building, facing Adelaide Park Lands, was for many years the middle school before it became the school's music and drama centre.

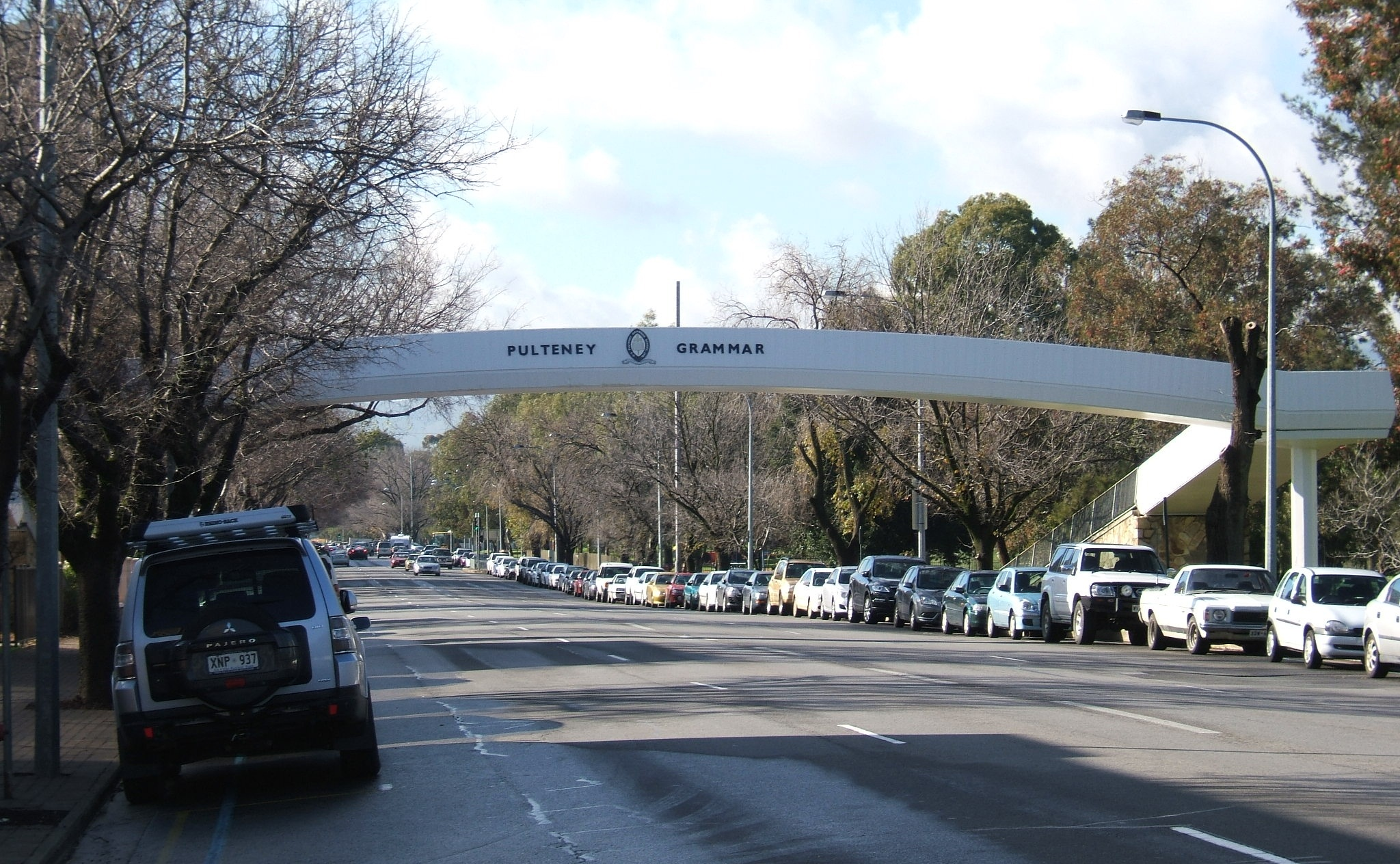
The school's footbridge allows pedestrians to safely cross heavily trafficked South Terrace.

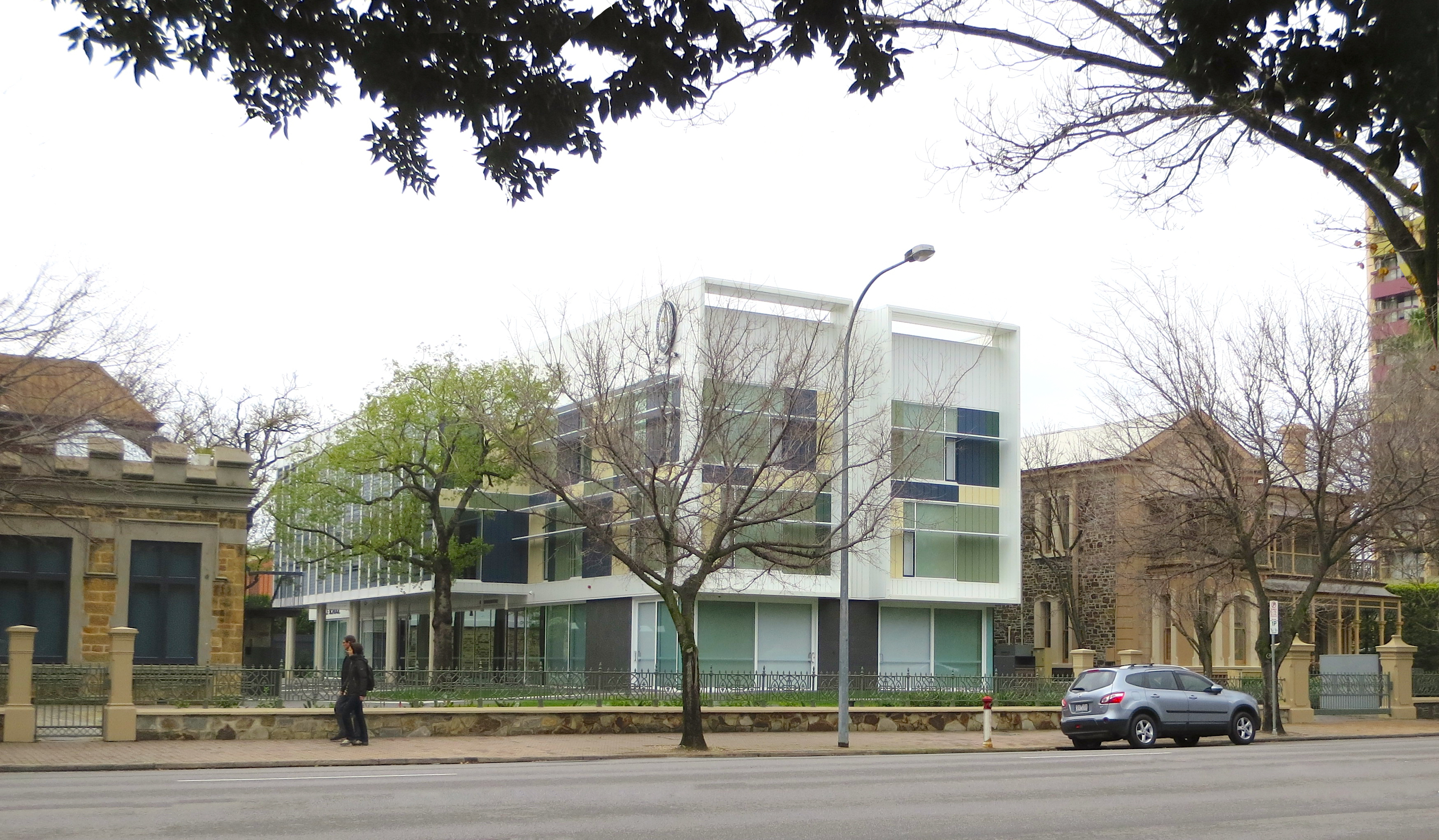
The Middle School building, completed in 2018, was awarded an architectural prize.

In 1915, space had become insufficient to house all of the classes, threatening the school's survival. While pupils studied in two unsatisfactory venues elsewhere in the city, the trustees looked further afield and in 1916 purchased an acre of land belonging to St Peter's College on South Terrace, facing the Adelaide Park Lands. (Note: The school, now intensively developed on its site, makes good use of the park lands: it leases 6 ovals, cricket nets, 3 lawn tennis courts, 2 grass volleyball courts and facilities, which are open for community use.)

In 1919, the school was forced out after its premises were compulsorily acquired by the Commonwealth Government "for repatriation purposes" following World War I, Despite privations of finance and post-war materials and labour shortages and strikes, the building that was to become the core of the new school was opened on 3 July 1921. Its capacity, 300, was at last sufficient for the enrolment of 249 boys, if only temporarily: four new classrooms were built in 1923.

The move occurred half-way through the tenure of the school's longest-serving headmaster, William Percival Nicholls, 1901–1942, under whom enrolments increased steadily. A highly principled man with a great sense of humour, he enlarged the curriculum and introduced a branch of commercial education through typewriting and shorthand; the school gained a solid reputation for its commercial classes. A rivalry soon developed between pupils at the adjoining Gilles Street Primary School and those at Pulteney. During lunch hours there were pitched battles in the creeks that ran through the cow pasture opposite Pulteney, with both sides throwing rocks and cow-pats. The headmaster often stood at the windows overlooking the area and, with his binoculars, picked out the various students who were fighting; they were subsequently invited to a dreaded meeting in his office.

The school's finances were on less firm ground than enrolments and academic standards. World War II, with its many privations including a severe shortage of teachers, took its toll and by 1944 the school was facing a crisis of such magnitude that its future was again in the balance. After two interim headmasters had been engaged during the end of the war and its aftermath, the Revd William Robert Ray was appointed in 1947 to bring the school back on to its feet in three years pending a further review, including by raising enrolments to 250 by the end of 1949. Ray, to whom the boys gave the nickname "Rufus", and later "The Boss", was described by his deputy as "something of a maverick: he made his own rules, was bound by nothing or nobody, and was a supreme headmaster whose care for his pupils and staff was infinite." He saw Pulteney as more than a school: to him, it was a community. He was a powerful orator who used his skill to publicise his school. And there were some external advantages in 1947: South Australia's burgeoning post-war economy brought many families to the state from interstate and overseas, and increasing financial aid for education became available from both the Commonwealth and state governments. During Ray's first seven years in charge, enrolment rose from 162 to 608 amid an almost continuous building program. Increased numbers of boys and staff, and the addition of Year 11 and Year 12 classes in 1953, led to a resurgence of confidence in the school.

== 21st century ==
During 1998, discussions commenced with Woodlands Church of England Girls Grammar School with a view to merging with Pulteney following several years of the former school's declining enrolments. Negotiations collapsed and no merger occurred. (Note: Woodlands closed its doors at the end of 1998. In 1999, the lower years of Woodlands amalgamated with those of existing co-educational primary school St Peter's Glenelg Anglican Grammar School, to become St Peter's Woodlands Grammar School catering for early learning to Year 6.) In the event, Pulteney finalised its longstanding planning for co-education when it welcomed girls of all ages from the beginning of 1999. In 2002, the school opened an innovative early learning centre, Kurrajong, for pupils up to and including year 2.

The school described itself in 2013 as "firmly established, soundly administered and growing".

== School structure and demographics ==
The school has four age-based sub-schools on the South Terrace campus, each overseen by a "head of school" who responds to the principal. They are the early learning centre, Kurrajong, for pupils up to and including year 2; prep school for years 3–6; middle school for years 7–9, and "one ninety" (senior school) for years 10–12. (Note: Originally years 11–12; year 10 was in the middle school.) According to the Australian Curriculum, Assessment and Reporting Authority, in 2022 there were 894 pupils (505 boys, 389 girls) at the school and 139.5 full-time equivalent staff (95 teaching, 44.5 non-teaching). The Distribution of Socio-Educational Advantage, for which the Australian distribution is 25% in each quartile, was: bottom quarter, 1%; lower middle quarter, 6%; upper middle quarter, 25%; top quarter 68%. The attendance rate in 2022, previously 95%, was 89% – the significant variation being caused by the high Covid-19 Omicron variant and influenza infections. Of 82 students completing senior secondary school, 81 were awarded a certificate.

== Notable alumni ==
A large and active Old Scholars' Association maintains a strong connection between the school and its alumni. Membership is extended to students on graduation from year 12.

Notable alumni of Pulteney Grammar School include the following:

- Bruce Abernethy, AFL player and sports news reader
- Michael Aish, Magarey Medal winner 1981
- Arthur Seaforth Blackburn VC, *Brigadier Arthur Seaforth Blackburn]] served in World War I, in which he won the Victoria Cross. During World War II he became a prisoner of war. He subsequently had a distinguished legal career.CMG, soldier, lawyer and coroner; winner of the Victoria Cross for most conspicuous bravery at Pozières; member of the South Australian Parliament
- Harry Blinman, renowned South Australian cricketer and president of the South Australian Cricket Association
- Michael Burden, fellow in Music, Dean and Chattels Fellow at New College, Oxford; director of New Chamber Opera, and professor of Opera Studies in the Faculty of Music, University of Oxford
- John Darling, company director and South Australian politician, member for East Torrens 1896–1902, member for Torrens 1902–1905
- Peter Dawson, internationally acclaimed bass-baritone and songwriter
- Lewis Fitz-Gerald, actor
- Josh Francou, Magarey Medal winner 1996, player for North Adelaide Roosters (SANFL) and Port Adelaide Football Club (AFL) Australian rules football clubs
- John Gardner MP, South Australian minister for education (2018–2022), member for Morialta (2010–)
- Ian Haig AM, diplomat and business leader
- Frederick Holder KCMG, 19th Premier of South Australia, prominent member of inaugural Commonwealth Parliament, first Speaker of the Australian House of Representatives
- Wyatt Roderic "Rory" Hume, dental academic and university administrator; vice-chancellor of the University of New South Wales, provost and executive vice president for academic and health affairs of the University of California, and provost of the United Arab Emirates University
- Andrew Leipus, sports physiotherapist
- Jordan McMahon, AFL player for the Richmond Tigers
- Stephen Mullighan MP, South Australian minister for transport and infrastructure (2014–2018), member for Lee (2014–)
- Ted Mullighan, QC, South Australian Supreme Court judge
- Lloyd Pope, under 19 Australian cricketer
- Richard Sanders Rogers, medical pioneer; authority on Australian orchids
- Jeffrey Smart, expatriate Australian artist who forged a distinctive style of realist painting with metaphysical overtones, widely regarded as Australia's greatest living painter until his death in 2013
- Brigadier General Stanley Price Weir DSO VD, public servant and Australian Army officer

== Controversies ==
In 2009, heritage groups and members of the public criticised Pulteney's plan to demolish a two-storey bluestone mansion within the school's boundary. The building was not heritage listed, but it was one of the last remaining mansions on South Terrace and had been recommended for conservation under Adelaide's Townscape List. The school went ahead with demolition, citing a need to act quickly to take advantage of the national economic stimulus program after the 2008 financial crisis and that retaining the building was neither practical nor affordable.

In August 2023, a petition was circulated by self-described "members of the Pulteney community" complaining about changes in the school's culture; and changes such as the merging of its middle school and the previously self-contained unit for year 11 and 12 students. The school's board promptly engaged an independent firm to conduct a review of its leadership, to be completed by mid-October. Parents of the school rallied behind the school leadership and advocated for the improvements to the school during their tenure. The school's principal, Cameron Bacholer, who was appointed in 2020, resigned on 10 October. The school board subsequently undertook a review of their governance in 2024 and the Chair of the Board, subsequently resigned.

== Academic results ==
In 2025, Pulteney Grammar School's graduating cohort achieved a median ATAR of 89.2, with 100% of students completing their SACE.
