= James Farrell (priest) =

Irish dean (1803–1869)

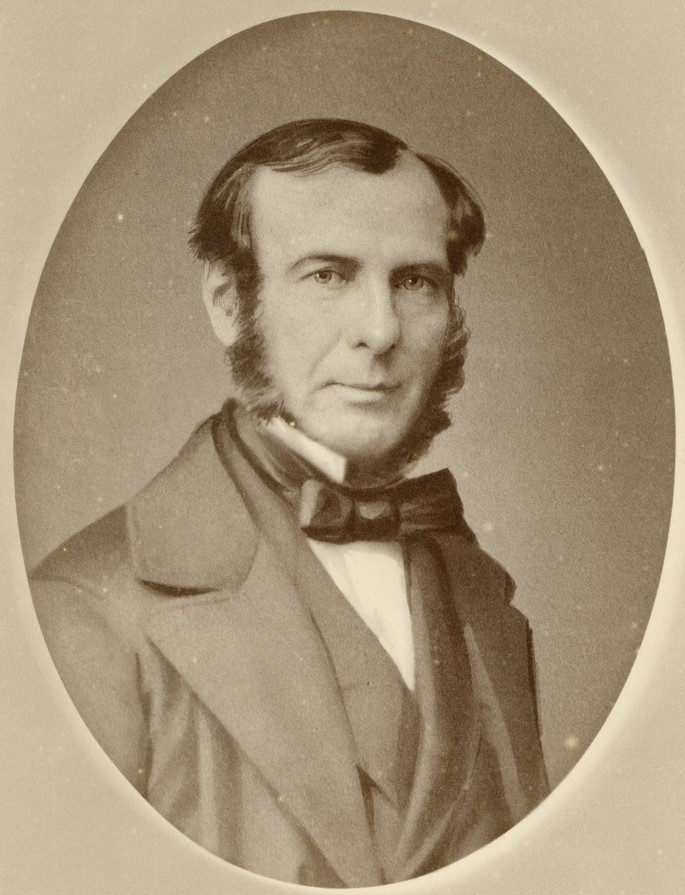
James Farrell (c.1854)

James Farrell (26 November 1803 – 26 April 1869) was the Dean of Adelaide from 1849 until 1866.

He was born in Longford, Ireland and educated at Trinity College, Dublin where he graduated M.A. He was ordained in 1826 and was a curate at Kilfree. After this he held incumbencies in Guernsey and Studley before becoming an SPG missionary in South Australia. On arrival in September 1840, he acted as assistant to Rev. C. B. Howard, the first Colonial Chaplain. He ministered at St John's Church, Adelaide from October 1841 to around July 1843, followed by Trinity Church in the same city.

In November 1845, Farrell married Grace Montgomery Howard, the widow of the Rev. C. B. Howard (died on 19 July 1843), whom he had succeeded as Colonial Chaplain.

Farrell died on 26 April 1869 at Malvern, while on a visit to England, and the office of Colonial Chaplain expired with him. He left four scholarships of £50 each to St. Peter's Collegiate School, Adelaide; and a window was erected to his memory in Trinity Church, of which he had been incumbent as well as dean.

The Mid North town of Farrell Flat is named in his honour.

Religious titles
Preceded by Inaugural appointment	Dean of Adelaide; 1849–1866	Succeeded by Alexander Rutherford Russell
