= St Paul's College, Adelaide =

St Paul's College

Location
- 792 Grand Junction Road; Gilles Plains, South Australia; 34°50′50″S 138°39′18″E

Information
- Type: Independent primary and secondary school
- Motto: Certa bonum certamen (Fight the good fight)
- Religious affiliation: Catholicism
- Denomination: Congregation of Christian Brothers
- Established: 27 July 1958; 68 years ago
- Founder: Christian Brothers
- Trust: Edmund Rice Education Australia
- Principal: Patrick Harmer
- Years offered: R–12
- Enrolment: 1,024 (2023)
- Colours: Black, gold, blue and red
- Affiliation: Sports Association for Adelaide Schools
- Website: www.stpauls.sa.edu.au
- Christian Brothers schools in South Australia; CBC • Rostrevor • St. Paul's

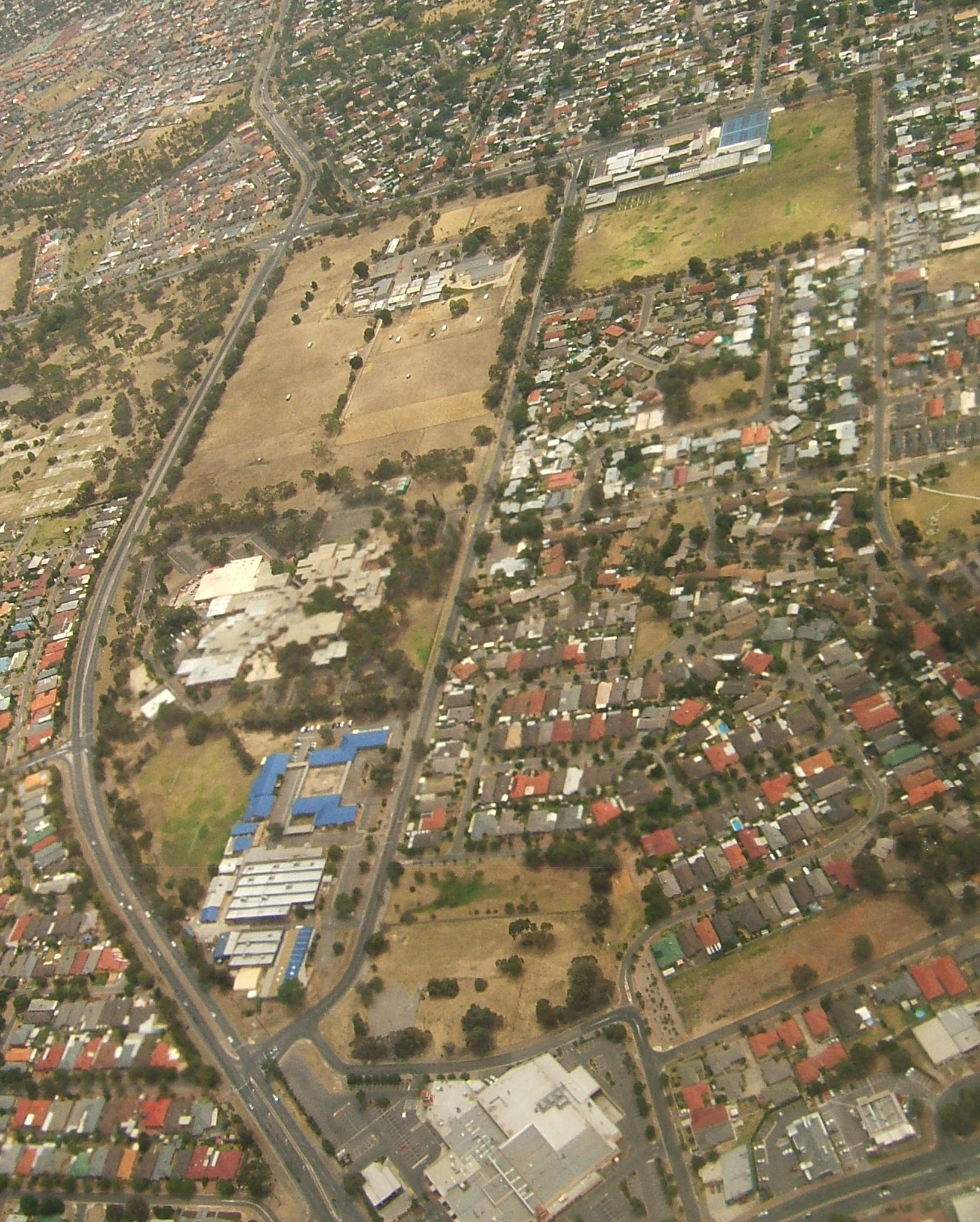
Aerial image of western part of Gilles Plains, looking north. The green and concrete rectangle to the top right is St Paul's College.

St Paul's College is a Catholic primary and secondary school founded in 1958, located in Gilles Plains, in the north-eastern suburbs of Adelaide, South Australia. One of three schools founded and formerly run in South Australia (along with Christian Brothers College, Adelaide and Rostrevor College), by the Christian Brothers, the school has been a member of EREA since 2007.

== History ==
The school was founded by the Christian Brothers in 1958 as an all-boys Catholic school for Years 5–11 administrated by the Brothers, in the largely agricultural area of Gilles Plains, then known as Strathmont. This was done following the closure of the Christian Brothers' school St Laurence's Primary in Ovingham, South Australia. The school opened in February 1959 for students in years 5-8, and the full year 5-11 cohort was established in 1962. Originally, students were drawn primarily from the parishes of Walkerville, Kilburn, Clearview, Enfield and Hillcrest. Enrolments later surged after private and Housing Trust development occurred in the area, namely in the suburbs of Valley View, Ingle Farm, Modbury, Dernancourt and Surrey Downs. Many Christian Brothers resided at the college, though lay staff were employed at the school from day one. A gradual decline in membership of the Christian Brothers occurred from the 1970s, and the last brother left the school in 2006. After the restructuring of Christian Brothers' organisations in October 2007, the school is now a member of Edmund Rice Education Australia.

In 1973, Year 12 was introduced to the school to ease local demand, with students previously travelling to Rostrevor College, Christian Brothers College, or government high schools. This was done in conjunction with Mt. Carmel College (Rosewater), who did not offer Year 12, making the senior school co-educational. This was done with the assistance of the Sisters of St Joseph. Kildare College (Holden Hill) joined this arrangement in 1975. This particular arrangement ceased in 1984, when both girls schools introduced their own Year 12 cohorts; however, St Paul's continued offering Year 12 for girls until 1996. In 1997, the senior school as a distinct structure was established, with vertically-structured cross-year homegroups being created, along with the new house system. In 2007, the partnership with Kildare College was rekindled, with students completing Year 11 & 12 SACE specialist subjects studying between the two campuses. This arrangement ended in 2020.

During 2013-17, the school introduced the lower primary years, with a full R-12 cohort being established in 2017. In 2022, the school became coeducational for years R-8, with the full co-educational cohort being established by 2026. This adds to the long history of partial co-education at St Paul's, beginning in 1973.

== Major Buildings ==
- Wilson Building
- Trembath Building
- Seaman Building
- Chapel
- Mackillop Building
- Murray Building
- New Street Gymnasium
- Dally Building Flynn Building
- Waterford Building
- Callan Hall
- Brothers Building
- Grand Junction Trade Training Centre
- Primary Precinct Building
- Mt Sion Building

== List Of Principals ==
- 1959-1964 : Br. Dally
- 1965-1967 : Br. George Seaman
- 1968-1971 : Br. Trembath
- 1972-1976 : Br. Phillip Wilson
- 1977-1982 : Br. John X Murray
- 1983-1986 : Mr. John Morgan
- 1987-1992 : Mr. William Griffiths
- 1993-2007 : Mr. Peter Shanahan
- 2008-2014 : Mr. Daniel Lawler
- 2015-2025 : Mr. Paul Belton
- 2025–Present : Mr. Patrick Harmer

== Education ==
Since 1984, the College Board has overseen administrative decisions in the school. The school has specialty facilities for arts, music, ICT and technology, as well as offering over 40 subjects.

Students are enrolled into the following houses:

- Dally House (Br. Anthony (Tony) Dally; 23 July 1925 – 29 November 1996)
- Gleeson House (The Rev. Fr. James Gleeson; 24 December 1920 – 21 March 2000)
- Marlow House (Wilfred Marlow; 22 October 1918 – 30 May 1988)
- O'Loughlin House (Michael; 13 May 1930 – 28 July 1987 & Eileen O'Loughlin; 29 October 1901 – 7 November 1991)
- Nagle House (The Ven. Honora “Nano” Nagle; 1718 – 26 April 1784)

Each year, students over Year 4 participate in a camp. These range from Adelaide Zoo to a mountain biking expedition, where students bring and cook their own meals.

== Notable alumni ==
- Nathan Arkley – 2012 Paralympic bronze medalist
- Thomas Deng – Football player
- Iain Fyfe – Former Adelaide United FC and Sydney FC player
- Stefan Giro – Australian rules footballer
- Steven Hall - Australian Soccer Player
- Bohdan Jaworskyj – Australian Rules Footballer
- Paul Kelly - Australian musician
- Ryan Kersten – NBL Player
- Doc Neeson – lead singer and frontman of the band, The Angels
- Michael O'Connell, first Commissioner for Victims' Rights in South Australia; Secretary-General for the World Society of Victimology; Deputy Chair for the Society’s United Nations Liaison Committee.
- Stuart O'Grady – Cyclist and Olympic gold medalist
- Ryan Schoenmakers – Australian rules footballer
- Cameron Roberts – Australian rules footballer
- Paul Rogers – NBL Player
- Guy Sebastian – Singer-songwriter
- Major General Stuart Lyle Smith, senior commander of the Australian Army
- Sean Wellman – Australian rules footballer
- Franklin dos Santos - CEO of Foodland Supermarkets

== See also ==
- List of schools in South Australia
- List of Christian Brothers schools
- Catholic education in Australia
