= Stephen Orr =

Australian writer (born 1967)

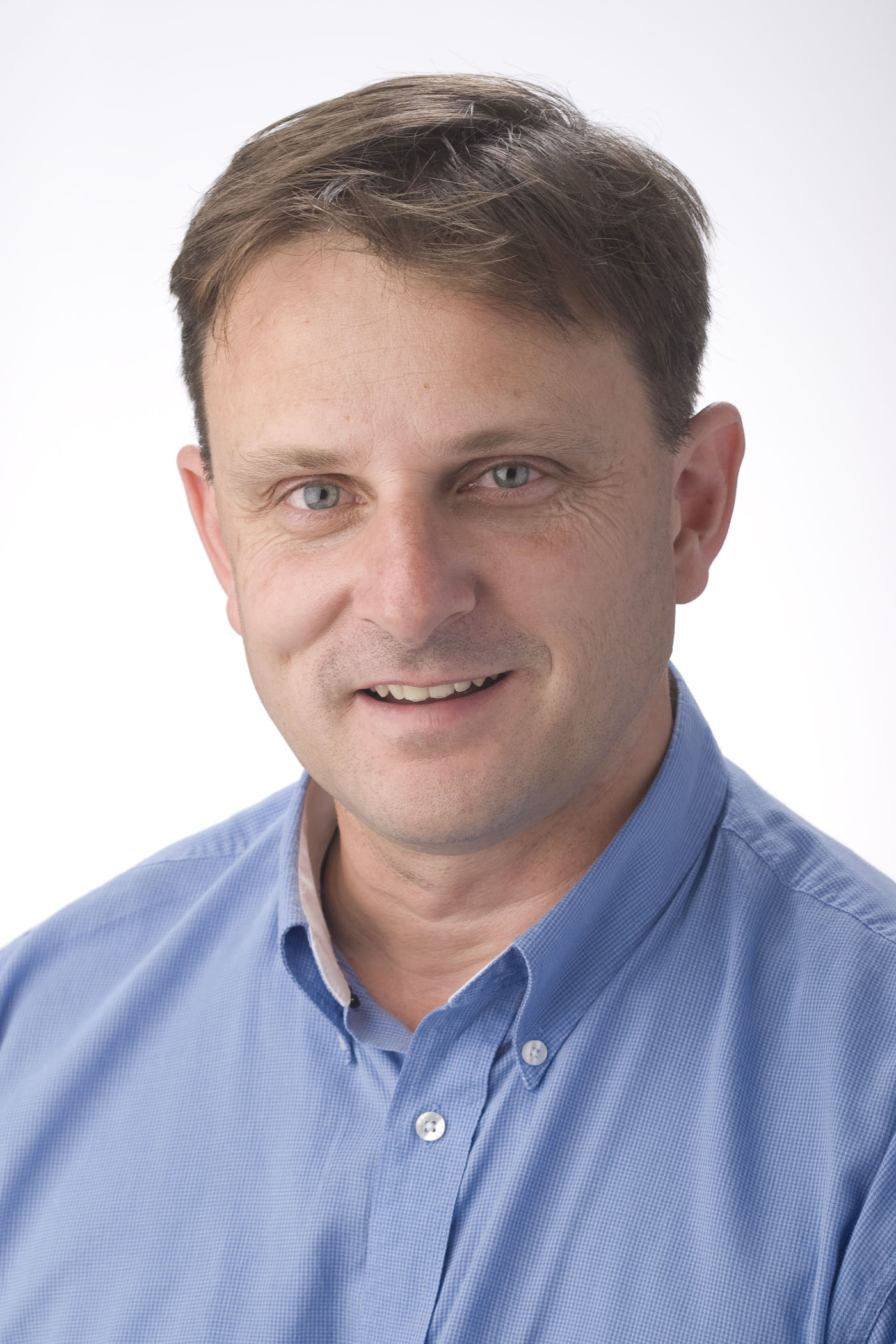
- Stephen Orr in 2009
- Born: 1967 (age 58–59); Adelaide, South Australia

Stephen Orr (born 1967) is an Australian writer of novels, short stories, and non-fiction. He has also adapted one of his novels for screen, and written a play. His works are set in uniquely Australian settings, including coastal towns, outback regions, and the Australian suburbs. His fiction explores the dynamics of Australian families and communities.

== Early life and education ==
Stephen Orr was born in 1967 (Note: Matilda Bookshop's bio states that he was born on 4 September 1969; but it also says his name is "Stephen Elder Barr-Smith Bonython Orr", and that he went to "Gilles Plains University", so assuming this is not a trusted source for biographical info!) in the Adelaide suburb of Hillcrest, South Australia, later reimagined as Gleneagles in his 2019 novel This Excellent Machine.

He attended Gilles Plains Primary School in Hillcrest and Gilles Plains High School in Windsor Gardens (now amalgamated to form Avenues College.

Orr completed a science degree at the University of Adelaide before studying one year of a music composition degree and a graduate diploma in education.

== Career ==
=== Early career ===
In May 1993, Orr was musical director of a production titled Nunsense, described as "an irreverant musical send-up of nuns on the run", presented by the Therry Dramatic Society Inc. at the Royalty Theatre in Adelaide.

Orr began his teaching career at Hervey Bay State High School in 1996.

=== Articles ===
Orr has written widely on issues such as nature, education, writers, and the art of writing. He was a long-time contributor to The Adelaide Review from 2008 until its final issue in October 2020. His long-form essay "Ambassadors from Another Time" was published in the Australian Book Review in October 2017.

He has also written for The Guardian, The Sydney Morning Herald / The Age, The Australian, The Canberra Times, Brisbane Times, WAtoday, Crikey, InDaily, Meanjin, The Adelaide Review, Good Reading, and other Australian newspapers and journals.

=== Fiction ===
Orr's first novel, Attempts to Draw Jesus, was originally written by him as a play. It was runner-up in The Australian/Vogel Literary Award in 2000 and was published in 2002. His second novel, Hill of Grace, a portrait of a 1950s Barossa Valley religious cult awaiting the rapture, was released in 2004.

In 2010 he published Time's Long Ruin, a fictional study of grief following the disappearance of three children in 1960s Adelaide, loosely based on the Beaumont children.

His 2012 novel Dissonance was a re-imagining of the lives of Australian composer Percy Grainger and his mother Rose. In the same year, his large scale 'play for voices' Westward Ho! was performed by a cast of international actors at the 2021 Adelaide Fringe Festival under the direction of Guy Masterson. His 2014 venture into crime writing, One Boy Missing, described the discovery of a lost boy in a small outback town, and the subsequent search for the cause of his trauma.

The Hands (2015) was an examination of the fallout from drought and generational debt on a grazing family in remote South Australia. His novella "Datsunland" was published in 2016. This story also appeared in his 2017 book of short stories, Datsunland.

Incredible Floridas (2017) is loosely based on the relationship between Australian artist Russell Drysdale and his son Tim. His most recent books include a collection of outback stories (The Fierce Country, 2018), the semi-autobiographical novel This Excellent Machine (2019), a riff on the 1944 Ern Malley literary hoax (Sincerely, Ethel Malley, 2021) as well as a second collection of stories, The Boy in Time (2022).

In 2021, concerned about a lack of engaging books for boys in his classes, he wrote and published The Lanternist, an Edwardian adventure story with illustrations by Timothy Ide.

His 2024 novel Shining Like the Sun (with a title based on a quote by Thomas Merton) explores the life of an old man trying to hold his family (and small town) together in the face of unalterable changes.

The Night Parrots (2026) describes the 1922 Central Australian journey of Pastor Martin Gerlach, his wife Alma and son Theo, in search of urgent medical care. The story was suggested by the final journey of Pastor Carl Strehlow, as recounted in his son Ted Strehlow's 1969 book Journey to Horseshoe Bend, and, according to the author is primarily "the story of a father and a son". The title refers to a critically endangered Australian bird species, the night parrot. Orr uses it as a metaphor, according to reviewer Ben Adams, "symbolising the power of belief in fragile, perhaps imagined things which can nevertheless allow people 'to feel secure'."

== Adaptations ==
In July 2015, an opera titled Innocence was produced by SINGular Productions and presented by the State Opera of South Australia at the State Opera Studio in Netley, SA. The libretto was written by Adam Goodburn and Anne Cawrse, based on Orr's 2010 novel Time's Long Ruin.

== Critical reception ==
In a 2021 review of Orr's Sincerely, Ethel Malley, the author and critic Michael McGirr wrote that Orr "is a prolific writer and his work is characterised by a methodical ability to deal with issues of substance. His writing has the energy required to sustain long narratives but is never histrionic".

== Recognition and awards ==
Orr's first novel, Attempts to Draw Jesus (2002) was runner-up in The Australian/Vogel Literary Award.

The Hands was longlisted for the Miles Franklin Award in 2016.

Orr's novella "Datsunland" was co-winner of the 2016 Griffith Review's 54 Earthly Delights: The Novella Project IV and was published in the same year.

Orr was the Australian Book Review Eucalypt Fellow in 2017.

He has also been nominated for the Commonwealth Writers' Prize and the International Dublin Literary Award.

== Selected works ==
=== Novels ===
- Attempts to Draw Jesus 2002
- Hill of Grace 2004
- Time's Long Ruin 2010
- Dissonance 2012
- One Boy Missing 2014
- The Hands 2015
- "Datsunland" 2016 (novella)
- Incredible Floridas 2017
- This Excellent Machine 2019
- Sincerely, Ethel Malley 2021
- Shining Like the Sun 2024
- The Night Parrots 2026

=== Young adult novel ===
- The Lanternist 2021

=== Short story collections ===
- Datsunland 2017
- The Boy in Time 2022

=== Play ===
- Westward Ho! (a play for voices or radio)
