= St. Paul's School =

St Paul's School may refer to:

== Australia ==
- St Paul's Anglican School, Bald Hills, in Brisbane, Australia

== Brazil ==
- St Paul's School, Brazil

== Canada ==
- St. Paul's High School (Winnipeg), Manitoba
- École St. Paul School, a Catholic school in North Park, Saskatoon

== Ghana ==
- St. Paul's Senior High School, formerly St. Paul's Secondary School, Hatsukope

== Hong Kong ==
- St. Paul's Convent School, in Causeway Bay
- St. Paul's Co-educational College, in the Mid Levels
- St. Paul's College, Hong Kong, in Bonham Road, Western Mid-Levels
- St. Paul's Primary Catholic School, a Grade II historic building in Happy Valley, Hong Kong

== India ==
- St Paul's School, Falna, Rajasthan
- St. Paul's School, Kota], Rajasthan
- St. Paul's Senior Secondary School, Udaipur, Rajasthan
- St. Paul's School, Darjeeling, Darjeeling
- St. Paul's School, Bahadurgarh, Haryana
- St. Paul's School, New Delhi, New Delhi
- St. Paul's Senior Secondary School, Palampur, Himachal Pradesh
- St Paul's School, Rourkela, Odisha
- St. Paul's High School, Belgaum, Karnataka
- St. Paul's Higher Secondary School, Vepery, Chennai, Tamil Nadu
- St. Paul's Higher Secondary School, Ujjain, Madhya Pradesh
- St. Paul's School, Gwalior, Madhya Pradesh
- St. Paul's School, Rajkot, Gujarat
- St Paul's Inter College, Shahjahanpur, Uttar Pradesh
- St Paul's International School, Rampurhat, West Bengal
- St Paul's School, Pali, Rajasthan

== Malaysia ==
- St. Paul's Institution, Seremban

== New Zealand ==
- St. Paul's School, Dallington in Dallington, New Zealand
- St Paul's School, Wellington, which later became Thorndon School
- St Paul's Collegiate School in Hamilton, New Zealand
- St Paul's Catholic School, Waikato in Ngāruawāhia

== Pakistan ==
- St Paul's English High School, Karachi

== Philippines ==
- Saint Paul School of San Antonio, Nueva Ecija

== United Kingdom ==
- St Paul's School, London, independent school for boys aged 13–18 (originally in the City of London, now in Barnes)
- St Paul's Cathedral School, independent school for boys aged 4–13 (near St Paul's Cathedral, London)
- St Paul's Girls' School, independent school in Hammersmith, London
- St Paul's School for Girls, Birmingham, a state-funded school for girls in Edgbaston, Birmingham, UK
- St Paul's Catholic School, Leicester, Evington, Leicester
- St Paul's Catholic School, Milton Keynes

== United States ==
- St. Paul's School (Louisiana)
- St. Paul's School (New Hampshire)
- St. Paul's School (New Jersey)
- St. Paul's School (New York)
- St. Paul's School (Virginia), a historic Rosenwald school building
- St. Paul's Episcopal School in Mobile, Alabama
- St. Paul's School for Boys, an Episcopal private school located in Brooklandville, Maryland
- St. Paul's School for Girls, an independent college-preparatory school in Brooklandville, Maryland
- St. Paul's Lutheran School in East Northport, New York

== See also ==
- St. Paul's School for Girls (disambiguation)
- Saint Paul's College (disambiguation)
- St. Paul High School (disambiguation)
- St. Paul's High School (disambiguation)
- St. Paul's Primary School (disambiguation)
- St. Paul (disambiguation)
