= Windsor Gardens, South Australia =

Windsor Gardens
- Suburb
- Country: Australia
- State: South Australia
- City: Adelaide
- LGA: City of Port Adelaide Enfield

Government
  - State electorate: Torrens
  - Federal division: Sturt

Area
  - Total: 2.5 km^{2} (0.97 sq mi)
- Elevation: 50–99 m (164–325 ft)

Population
  - Total: 5,827 (SAL 2021)
- Time zone: UTC+9:30 (+9:30)
  - Summer (DST): +10:30
- Postcode: 5087

Windsor Gardens is a suburb in the north-eastern suburbs of Adelaide, the capital of South Australia.

== History ==
The suburb of Windsor Gardens mostly dates from after the Second World War. In the 1950s, the South Australian Housing Trust commenced building in the area and some of the Trust's prefabricated, imported timber houses were built here during the period of 1950–4. The Trust imported the houses because of the shortage of building materials and skilled labor experienced after the War. Some thousands of these houses were erected in the suburbs of Klemzig, Gilles Plains, Hillcrest, Northfield, Windsor Gardens, and Clearview by the end of 1954.

A Windsor Gardens Post Office opened on 2 February 1954 but was replaced by the Greenacres office in 1963.

Each house came to South Australia in crates and were then assembled by tradesman, also sent out by the manufacturers. They consisted of a panel system covered by a timber-framed, iron clad roof. In plan, each building was rectangular and contained three bedrooms, a kitchen, laundry, bathroom and toilet. The companies that received the contracts to supply the houses were permitted to use only five Australian materials; water, sand, bricks for the outdoor chimney, under-foundation timbers and paint. All of the other components of the building had to be brought from Europe. There were some difficulties with this. As Germany operated with a metric scale, all of the plumbing, nuts and bolts etc. had to be purchased from England. Initially the site work had not been completed, so the newly-arrived tradesmen were driven to a paddock and told to start. Sewer and water mains were laid at the time the houses were being built. Despite the language difficulties and adjusting to the climate, many of the tradesmen stayed on as migrants, having arrived with temporary work permits. The South Australian Housing Trust intended that the houses would be sold but many people preferred to wait longer for a more traditional masonry house. As a result, the houses were rented, but to selected clients and at a higher rate.

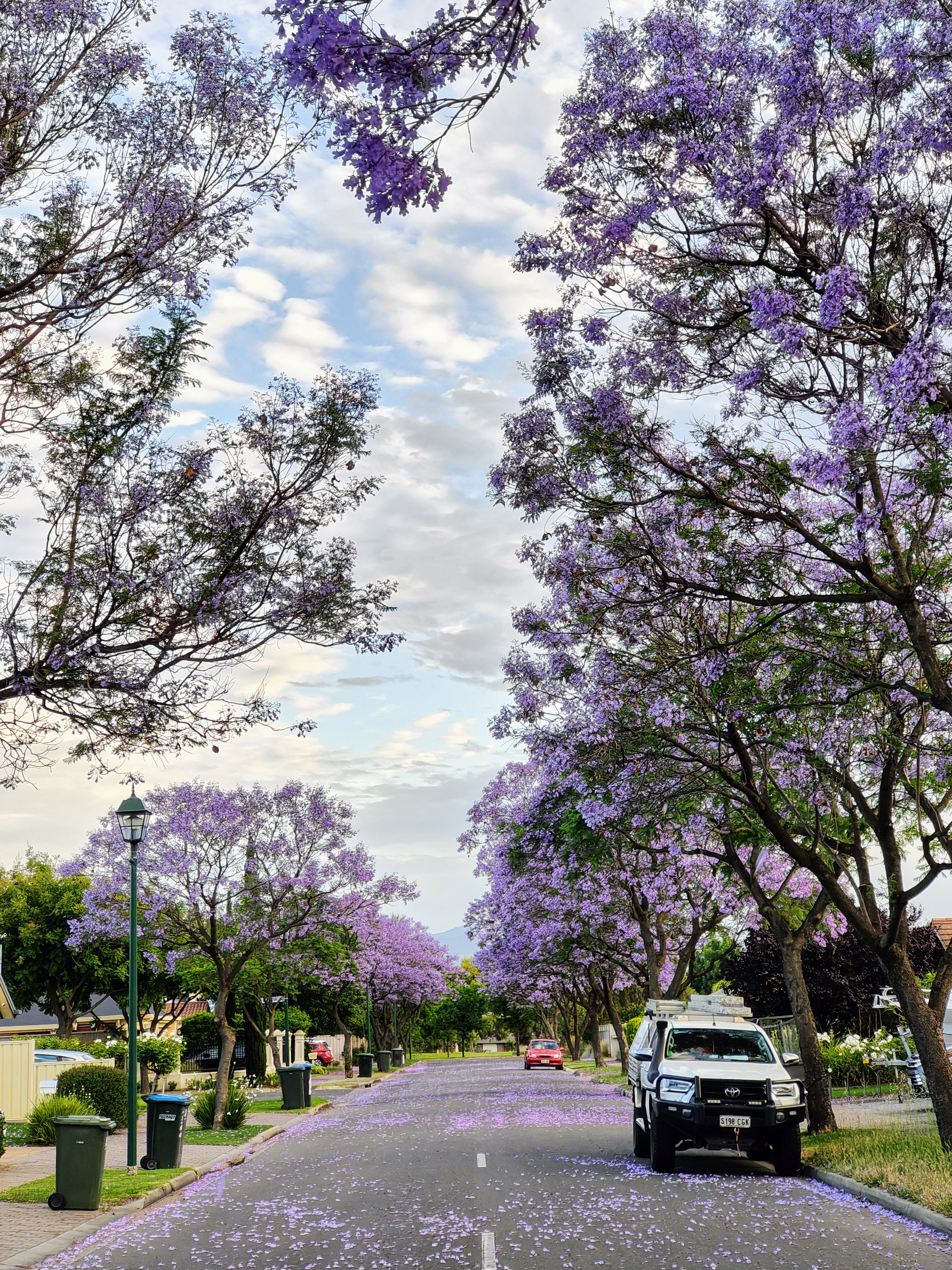
Jacaranda blossom

By 1960–1, Windsor Gardens was a hive of activity, with many houses in the course of construction. With the increasing population, other services were constructed in the area. In 1965, the Windsor Gardens Uniting Church was built on Pitman Road. Previously the small congregation had worshipped in a church at Gilles Plains that had been built in 1920. A new church was built because during the period of 1959 to 1961, the numbers attending the Gilles Plains church rose from five to 40 and from three to 147 children attending the Sunday School.

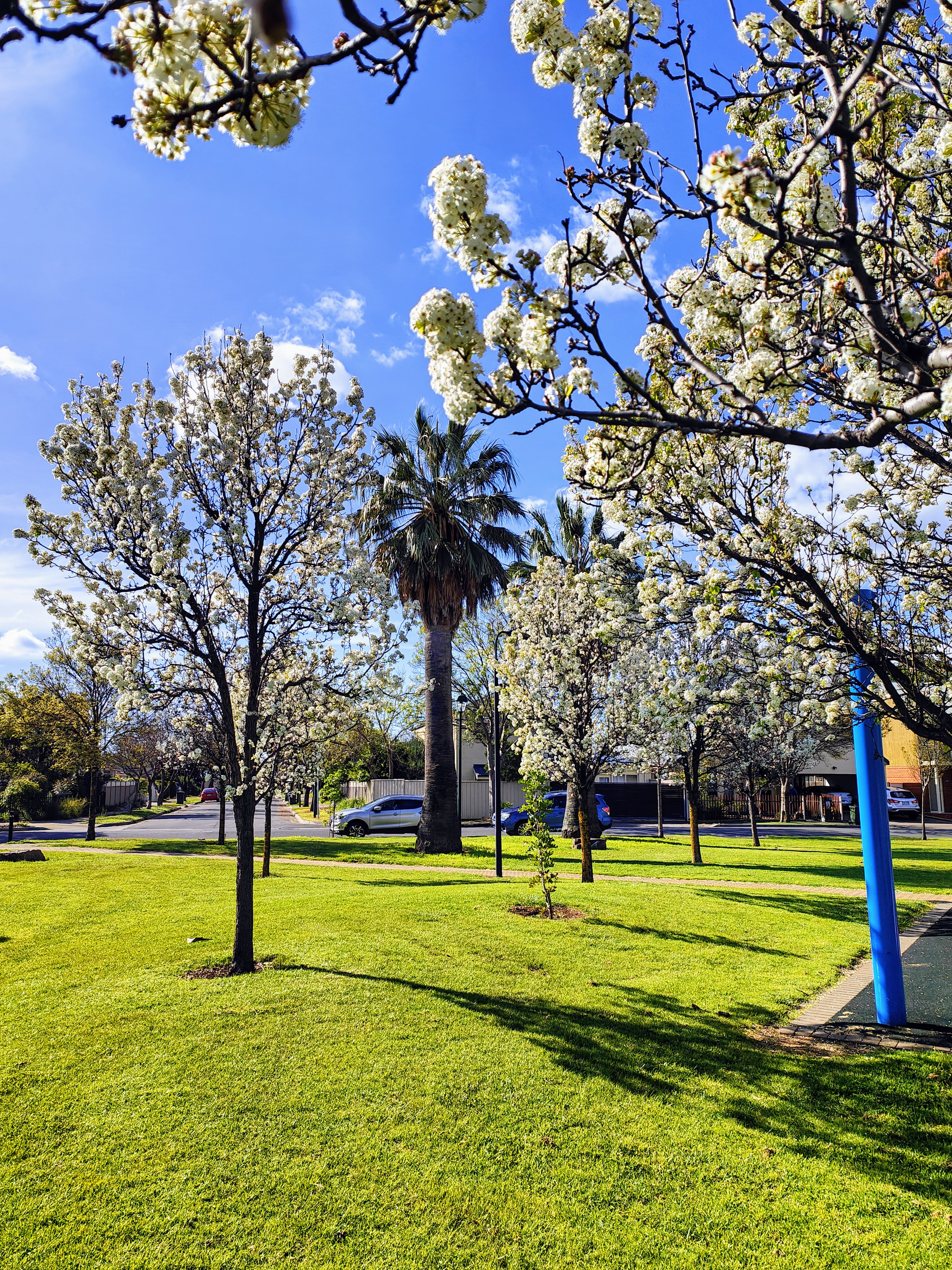
Hartley Grove

By 1964–5, the South Australian Housing Trust had built 675 houses at Windsor Gardens, mostly for sale rather than rental. Prior to this time the area was primarily a rural one, sparsely settled. The fact that the River Torrens runs through the suburb focused the farming and horticultural activities in the area of the River. Bagot's 'Beefacres Estate' occupied part of the Windsor Gardens area in the nineteenth century. Local legend claims that a small part of the Estate's homestead is incorporated into a residence at Windsor Gardens, but this is unconfirmed. At one point the estate reached all the way from the Darley Road Ford to the Hope Valley Reservoir.

To the east of Sudholz Road in Windsor Gardens, the housing stock is mostly dating from the 1960s, 1970s or later.

Darley Road was reconstructed around 1976, replacing the Darley Road ford with a major landscaping project and creating a bridge over the river.

== Governance and description ==
Windsor Gardens is within the local government area of City of Port Adelaide Enfield.

The suburb is located 7–12 km (4.3–7.5 mi) from the Adelaide CBD. Situated between North East Road (NW) and the River Torrens (SE), with suburbs Holden Hill to the north and Klemzig to the south.

== Education ==
Gilles Plains High School was founded in Windsor Gardens in 1960. Located on McKay Avenue, it was later known as Windsor Gardens Vocational College, Windsor Gardens Secondary College, and Windsor Gardens Secondary School. Aboriginal students from the Wiltja boarding scheme began studying at Windsor Gardens Vocational College in 2010.

In January 2017, Windsor Gardens Secondary School and Gilles Plains Primary School (located in Hillcrest) were officially amalgamated under the name "Windsor Gardens School B12". In 2018, work began on redeveloping the McKay Avenue site, to increase the capacity of the new school by 400 students. This included refurbishment of some existing school buildings to allow amalgamation of Gilles Plains Primary School and Gilles Plains Children's Centre on Beatty Street, Hillcrest (1901—2019) with the school, creating a new preschool and R-12 school, named Avenues College. The project was undertaken by Phillips Pilkington Architects. Building work was completed in 2020, but due to the COVID-19 pandemic, the formal opening of Avenues College was delayed until January 2023.
