= Saint Paul's College =

Several colleges and universities around the world are called Saint Paul's College/University or St. Paul's College/University, including:

== Africa ==
- St Paul's College, Grahamstown, Eastern Cape
- St. Paul's College, Namibia
- St. Paul's University, Limuru, Kenya

== Asia ==
- St. Paul's College, Hong Kong
- St. Paul's University (normally called Rikkyo University), Tokyo, Japan
- St. Paul's College, Macau

=== India ===
- St. Paul's College, Agra
- Saint Paul's College, Goa
- St. Paul's College, Kalamassery
- St.Paul's College, Mumbai
- St. Paul's College, in Ranchi Sadar subdivision, Jharkhand
- St. Paul's College, Lucknow, an educational institution in Lucknow
- St. Paul's Cathedral Mission College, Kolkata, known simply as Saint Paul's College

=== Philippines ===
- St. Paul University System, which includes:
  - St. Paul College of Ilocos Sur
  - St. Paul College of Makati
  - St. Paul College, Pasig

== Europe ==
- St Paul's College, Raheny, Ireland

=== United Kingdom ===
- St Paul's College, Sunbury-on-Thames
- St Paul's College of Education, Cheltenham, England, a former college integrated into the University of Gloucestershire

== North America ==
=== Canada ===
- St. Paul's College (Manitoba), Winnipeg
- Saint Paul University, federated with the University of Ottawa
- St. Paul's University College, University of Waterloo, Ontario

=== United States ===
- Saint Paul College, Saint Paul, Minnesota
- St. Paul's College, Concordia, Missouri, a former college of which St. Paul Lutheran High School (Missouri) was a department
- Saint Paul's College (Virginia)
- St. Paul's College, Washington, D.C.
- St. Paul's College and Grammar School, College Point, New York

== Oceania ==
=== Australia ===
- St Paul's College, Adelaide
- St Paul's College, Ballarat
- Emmanuel College: St. Paul's Campus, Melbourne (formerly St. Paul's College)
- St Paul's College, University of Sydney
- St Pauls Catholic College, Sydney
- St Paul's College, Kempsey
- St Paul's College, Manly, New South Wales
- St Paul's College, Walla Walla

=== New Zealand ===
- St Paul's College, Auckland
- St Paul's Collegiate School, Hamilton

== See also ==
- St. Paul's School (disambiguation)
- Saint Paul (disambiguation)
