= SPHS =

SPHS may stand for one of the following high schools:

In the United States:

- St. Patrick's High School (Maysville, Kentucky), a private Catholic high school in Maysville, Kentucky
- St. Patrick High School (North Platte, Nebraska), a private Catholic high school in North Platte, Nebraska
- St. Patrick High School (Portland, Michigan), a private Catholic high school in Portland, Michigan
- St. Paul High School (Ohio), a private Catholic high school in Norwalk, Ohio
- St. Peter High School, a public school in St. Peter, Minnesota
- St. Petersburg High School, a public school in St. Petersburg, Florida
- San Pasqual High School (Escondido, California), a public high school in Escondido, California
- San Pasqual High School (Winterhaven, California), a public high school in Winterhaven, California
- San Pedro High School, a public high school in San Pedro, Los Angeles, California
- Science Park High School (New Jersey), a public high school in Newark, New Jersey
- Severna Park High School, a public high school in Severna Park, Maryland
- Sierra Pacific High School, a public high school in Hanford, California
- South Pasadena High School, a public high school in South Pasadena, California
- South Plainfield High School, a public high school in South Plainfield, New Jersey
- South Plantation High School, a public high school in Plantation, Florida
- South Plaquemines High School, a public high school in Buras, Louisiana
- South Pointe High School (Phoenix, Arizona), a public high school in Phoenix, Arizona
- South Pointe High School (Rock Hill, South Carolina), a public high school in Rock Hill, South Carolina
- South Portland High School, a public high school in South Portland, Maine
- Sparrows Point High School, a public school in Baltimore county, Maryland
- Special Projects High School, now known as University High School (Tucson), an accelerated public high school in Tucson, Arizona
- Stony Point High School, a public school in Round Rock, Texas
- Sun Prairie High School, a high school in Sun Prairie, Wisconsin
- Suncoast Polytechnical High School
- Sunset Park High School

In other countries:

- Sandy Point High School, a public high school in Saint Kitts and Nevis
- South Point High School, a privately owned elite school in Kolkata, West Bengal, India

== See also ==
- St. Patrick's High School (disambiguation)
- St. Paul High School (disambiguation)
