= Oakden, South Australia =

Coordinates: 34°51′11″S 138°38′37″E

Oakden
- Suburb
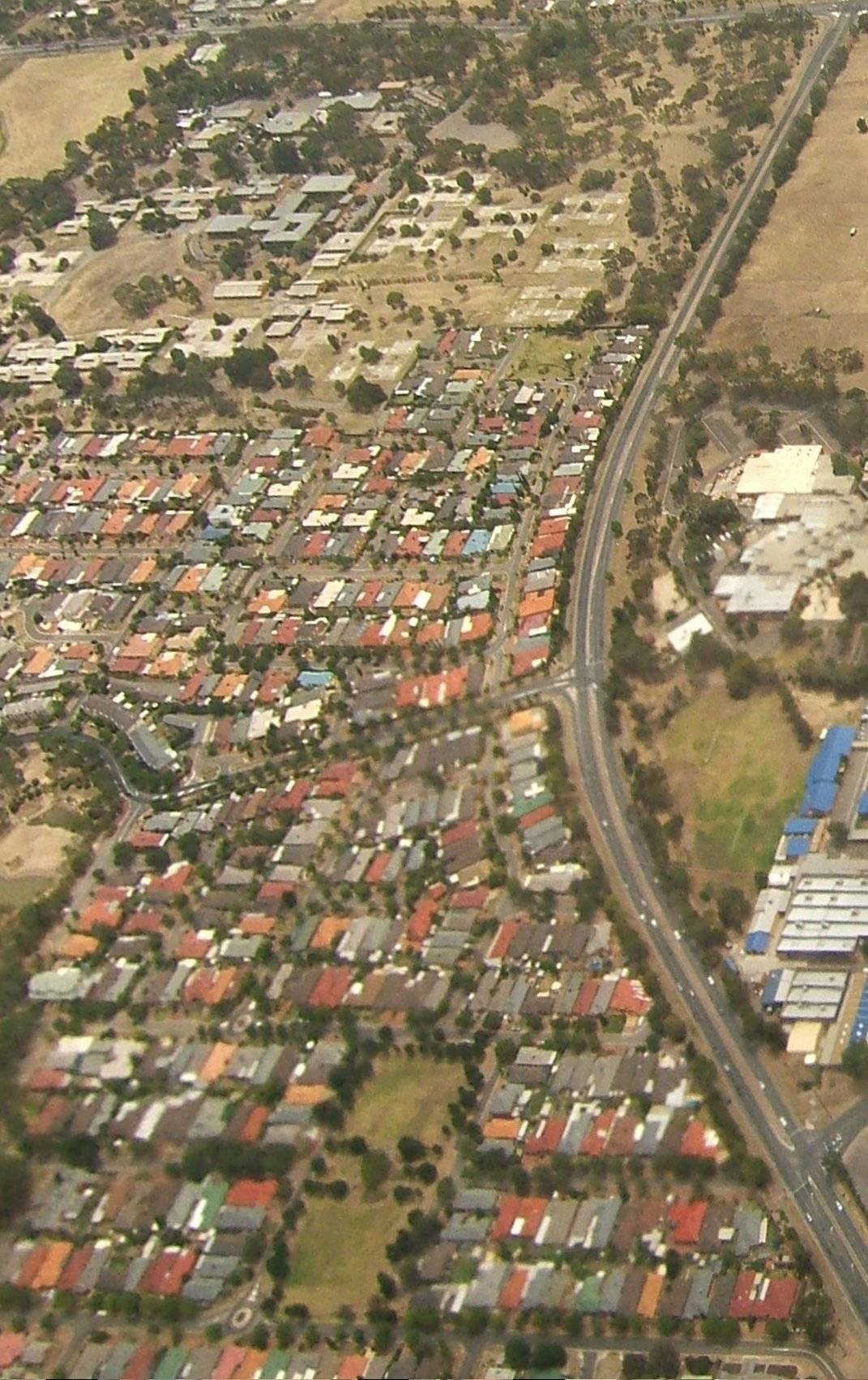
- Aerial image of eastern half of Oakden, bounded by Grand Junction Road to the north (top of frame), and Sudholz Road to the east
- Country: Australia
- State: South Australia
- City: Adelaide
- LGA: City of Port Adelaide Enfield
- Location: 12 km (7.5 mi) from Adelaide
- Established: 1993

Government
  - State electorate: Torrens
  - Federal division: Sturt

Population
  - Total: 3,583 (SAL 2021)
- Postcode: 5086
Suburbs around Oakden
Northfield	Walkley Heights	Valley View
Northgate	Oakden	Gilles Plains
Lightsview	Hillcrest	Gilles Plains

Oakden is a suburb of Adelaide, South Australia, located to the northeast of the Central Business District. It was established as a housing estate named Regent Gardens in 1992 and is located on former Department of Agriculture land.

== Geography ==
The area, which includes land formerly known as Gilles Plains and a small portion of SA Housing Trust properties and land from Hillcrest, was renamed 'Oakden' in 1993, using the maiden name of the wife of Osmond Gilles, who was South Australia's first Colonial Treasurer. Gilles married Patience Oakden in Hamburg, Germany in 1825, but she died in England in 1833. Her brother, a former business partner of Gilles, was the banker and pastoralist Philip Oakden. Her nephew was the South Australian explorer and pastoralist John Oakden. Suburbs Northgate and Northfield are also right next to Oakden.

Its boundary is Lord Howe Avenue, Oxford Street, and Bristol Terrace to the south, Sudholz Road to the east, Grand Junction Road to the north, and Fosters Road to the west.

== History ==
=== Oakden scandal ===
Makk and McLeay Nursing Home, a part of the state government's Aged Mental Health Care Service in Oakden, became the subject of ill notoriety in 2016 and 2017 when it was sanctioned by the federal government following allegations (later proved) of mistreatment of residents. Due to enormous public pressure, the facility was effectively closed in April 2017. The following political fallout was known in the media as the 'Oakden scandal'.

== Main sights ==
Its notable buildings include the Salvation Army Corps and Community Centre; the Christadelphian Church run Heritage College Adelaide; James Nash House, a secure mental health facility; various former Hillcrest Hospital buildings, most of which have been converted for use by other tenants including for student accommodation, small business and nursing home; The Oakden Central, a tavern run by the Adelaide City FC with associated training venue; the Oakden Fire Station; and the remainder of the Strathmont Centre (1971–2017), a Government of South Australia institution for those with a severe intellectual disability. Makk and McLeay Nursing Home and Clements House, formerly known as Hillcrest Hospital, which closed in 2017 was also in Oakden at 200 Fosters Road. The facility was a part of the state government's Aged Mental Health Care Service.

Oakden has two retail establishments, housed in the same building on Sir Ross Smith Boulevard, consisting of a cafe and hairdresser.

It is home to Roy Amer Reserve, a regional park including wetlands that serves as a storm water capture and aquifer recharge system as well as a native fish sanctuary, which was constructed by the City of Port Adelaide Enfield in the early 1990s and won state and national engineering awards.

== See also ==
- List of Adelaide suburbs
