= St. Paul's High School =

St. Paul's High School may refer to:

== India ==
- St. Paul's High School, Belgaum
- St. Paul's High School, Dadar, Mumbai
- St. Paul's High School, Hajipur
- St. Paul's High School, Hyderabad
- St. Paul's High School, Veliyanad

== Other countries ==
- St. Paul's High School (Winnipeg), Manitoba, Canada
- St. Paul's High School, Rangoon, Myanmar
- St Paul's High School, Dunedin, New Zealand
- St Paul's High School, Bessbrook, Northern Ireland
- St Paul's English High School, Karachi, Pakistan
- St Paul's High School, Glasgow, Scotland
- St. Paul's High School, Musami, Zimbabwe

== See also ==
- St. Paul High School (disambiguation)
- St. Paul's School (disambiguation)
- Saint Paul (disambiguation)
