= Anne Cawrse =

Australian classical composer

Anne Cawrse (/kɔːrs/ "coarse"; born 23 January 1981) is an Australian composer based in South Australia. As of 2022 she is on the composition staff at Elder Conservatorium of Music in Adelaide.

== Early life and education ==
After growing up in Freeling, South Australia, she moved to Adelaide to study composition at the Elder Conservatorium of Music, where she completed her PhD in 2008.

== Career ==
In 2021, Cawrse became the curator of the Adelaide Symphony Orchestra festival "She Speaks", a classical music festival with a focus on music written by female composers. The festival included a performance of Cawrse's Suite from Innocence, her opera based on Stephen Orr's novel Time's Long Ruin. In 2022, she co-curated the festival with Anna Goldsworthy.

In 2022, Cawrse's album Advice to a Girl was released on ABC Classics. It features works for strings, voice and guitar, performed by Sharon and Slava Grigoryan (cello, guitar), Bethany Hill (soprano), Aleksandr Tsiboulski (guitar) and the Australian String Quartet.

== Recognition and awards ==
Her work On Earth as in Heaven, using texts by Michael Leunig and Sara Teasdale, was a finalist in the 2018 APRA Art Music Awards in the Vocal/Choral Work of the Year category.

Cawrse's work A Room of Her Own (2020) for string quartet won the 2021 Albert H. Maggs Composition Award and the 2021 APRA Art Music Award in the Work of the Year: Chamber category. A Room of Her Own was commissioned, premiered and released by the Australian String Quartet.

In 2022, she was one of the recipients of the Prelude Composer Residencies, awarded by the Peggy Glanville-Hicks Trust.

The Australian Women in Music Awards is an annual event that celebrates outstanding women in the Australian music industry who have made significant and lasting contributions in their chosen field. They commenced in 2018.

| Year | Nominee / work | Award | Result | Ref. |
|---|---|---|---|---|
| 2023 | Anne Cawrse | Excellence in Classical Music Award | Nominated | |
