= Hillcrest, South Australia =

Hillcrest
- Suburb
- Coordinates: 34°51′43″S 138°38′35″E
- Country: Australia
- State: South Australia
- City: Adelaide
- LGA: City of Port Adelaide Enfield

Government
  - State electorate: Torrens
  - Federal division: Sturt

Population
  - Total: 3,659 (SAL 2021)
- Postcode: 5086
Suburbs around Hillcrest
Northgate	Oakden	Gilles Plains
Lightsview	Hillcrest	Holden Hill
Greenacres	Klemzig	Windsor Gardens

Hillcrest is a suburb of Adelaide in the City of Port Adelaide Enfield local government area. It is around 10 km northeast of the city centre.

== History ==
The suburb was formerly the location of the Hillcrest Hospital, a psychiatric hospital which before 1964 was known as Northfield Mental Hospital, run by the state government. On 1 July 1979, Enfield Hospital was merged with Hillcrest Hospital, with all Enfield Hospital patients transferred to Hillcrest by 1982. In 1991 it had 370 beds and also administered the Northfield Security Hospital and a rehabilitation hostel at College Park. Hillcrest Hospital closed in 1994. The remainder of the former psychiatric hospital and its converted buildings are now within the suburb of Oakden.

The northern part of Hillcrest was renamed Gilles Plains.

From 1993, a concerted effort by the Government of South Australia to update the housing stock in Hillcrest began. From being predominantly weatherboard dwellings on traditional large blocks, with a large percentage of Housing SA-owned dwellings, smaller dwellings were built on smaller blocks.

== Description ==
Hillcrest is bounded by the side streets of Lord Howe Avenue, Oxford Street and Bristol Terrace to the north, Blacks Road to the east, North East Road to the South and Fosters Road to the west.

Hillcrest is bisected by large linear reserves, which are the remnants of the proposed Tea Tree Gully rail line proposed in the 1950s but which never eventuated.

The North East Road section of the suburb is almost completely commercial in nature, noted for its large number of motor vehicle dealerships, and is also home to the North East Community Assistance Project which is housed in the heritage listed former Gilles Plains Primary School building.

The suburb is also home to the Aveo Crestview Retirement Village on the former Anchor Foods factory site on Fosters Road, which was opened in 1993 after Anchor Foods consolidated their production in Perth, Western Australia.

The Hillcrest Community Centre has been operated by the City of Port Adelaide Enfield since 1995.

== Education ==
A school was founded in 1901 at 489B North East Road, which was renamed Gilles Plains Primary School. Its 1907 red-brick building is now heritage-listed, It was later merged with Gilles Plains High School in Windsor Gardens to form Avenues College, which was completed in 2020 and officially opened in January 2023.
