= St. Paul's School for Girls =

St. Paul's School for Girls may refer to:

- St Paul's School for Girls, Birmingham, in Edgbaston, Birmingham, England
- St. Paul's School for Girls (Maryland), in Brooklandville, Maryland, U.S.
- St Paul's Girls' School, in Brook Green, Hammersmith, West London, England

== See also ==
- St Paul's School (disambiguation)
