= Valley View, South Australia =

Valley View
- Suburb
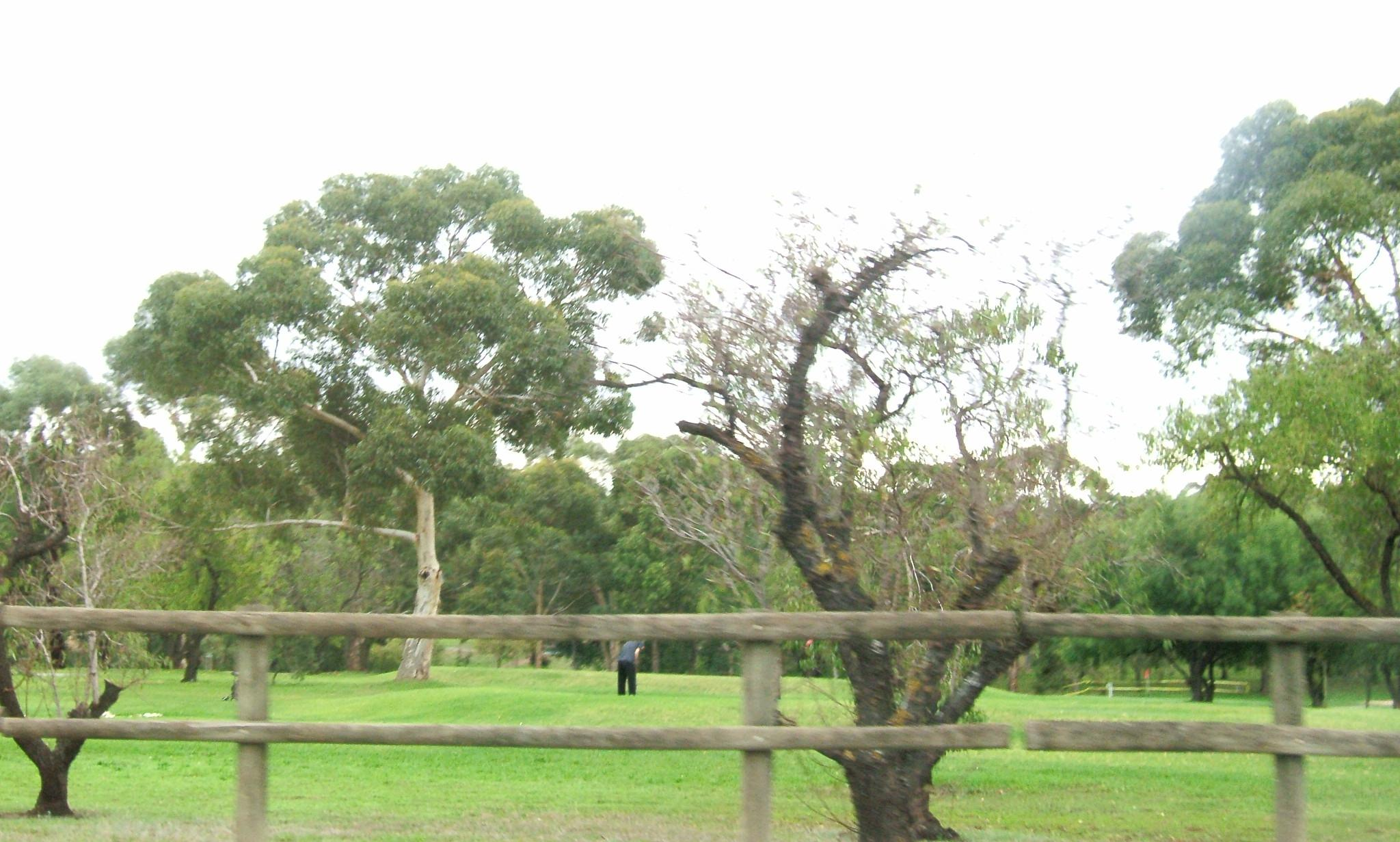
- Golf course at Valley View

- Country: Australia
- State: South Australia
- City: Adelaide
- LGA: City of Salisbury City of Port Adelaide Enfield City of Tea Tree Gully

Government
  - State electorate: Florey
  - Federal division: Makin

Population
  - Total: 6,405 (2021 census)
- Postcode: 5093
Suburbs around Valley View
Ingle Farm	Para Vista	Modbury
Walkley Heights	Valley View	Hope Valley
Oakden	Gilles Plains	Holden Hill

Valley View is a suburb of Adelaide, South Australia. It spans three separate local government areas. They are the City of Salisbury, the City of Port Adelaide Enfield, and the City of Tea Tree Gully. The suburb's boundaries are defined by the intersection of Walkleys, Grand Junction and North East Roads in the south, and Wright and Kelly Roads in the north and east.

== History ==
Valley View Post Office opened on 1 June 1967 and closed in 1993. An earlier office was opened as Para Vista on 13 January 1964, was renamed Valley View in October 1964 and Valley View East in May 1967 and closed in August 1967.

== Demographics ==
Historical population
Year	Pop.	±%
2001	5,887	—
2006	5,981	+1.6%
2011	5,986	+0.1%
2016	6,110	+2.1%
2021	6,405	+4.8%

The 2021 census by the Australian Bureau of Statistics counted 6,405 persons in Valley View on census night. Of these, 50.3% were male and 49.7% were female. The majority of residents (65.6%) are of Australian birth, with other common census responses being India (8.3%), England (3.7%), Philippines (1.4%), Italy (1.2%) and China (1.1%, without SARs and Taiwan).

The age distribution of Valley View residents is comparable to that of the greater Australian population. 70.8% of residents were 25 or older in 2021, compared to the Australian average of 69.9%; and 29.2% were younger than 25 years, compared to the Australian average of 30.1%

== Attractions ==
=== Parks ===
The largest park in Valley View is Thomas Turner Reserve on Nelson Road. Dry Creek runs through the reserve from east to west, dividing the Valley View golf course from the other areas in the park.

== Transport ==
=== Roads ===
The suburb is serviced by the following main roads:

- Walkleys Road, running north–south between Ingle Farm and Gilles Plains.
- Grand Junction Road, running east–west between Port Adelaide and Vista
- North East Road, running northeast–southwest between Collinswood and Inglewood

=== Public transport ===
Valley View is serviced by public transport run by the Adelaide Metro.

== See also ==
- List of Adelaide suburbs
