= St. Paul's Primary School =

St. Paul's Primary School may refer to:

- St. Paul's Co-educational (Kennedy Road) Primary School, Hong Kong
- St. Paul's Co-educational (Macdonnell Road) Primary School, Hong Kong
- St. Paul's Primary School Bentleigh, Bentleigh, Melbourne, Victoria, Australia

== See also ==
- St. Paul's School (disambiguation)
- Saint Paul (disambiguation)
