= Saint Paul School of San Antonio =

St. Paul School of San Antonio

Location
- San Antonio, Nueva Ecija; Philippines
- Coordinates: 15°18′10″N 120°51′25″E

Information
- Type: Private, Nonsectarian
- Motto: Transforming Lives for God and Society
- Religious affiliation(s): Roman Catholic
- Established: 1969
- Director: Jovita P. Villas, MA. Ed.
- Color(s): Green and Gold
- Affiliations: Cabanatuan Catholic Education System (CACES)

Saint Paul School of San Antonio (SPSSA; colloquially, "S.P.S.") is a private Diocesan Catholic school located at Cando Street, Poblacion, San Antonio, Nueva Ecija, Philippines. The school was established in 1969 by Bishop Vicente Reyes and the Sisters of St. Paul of Chartres (SPC).

== History ==
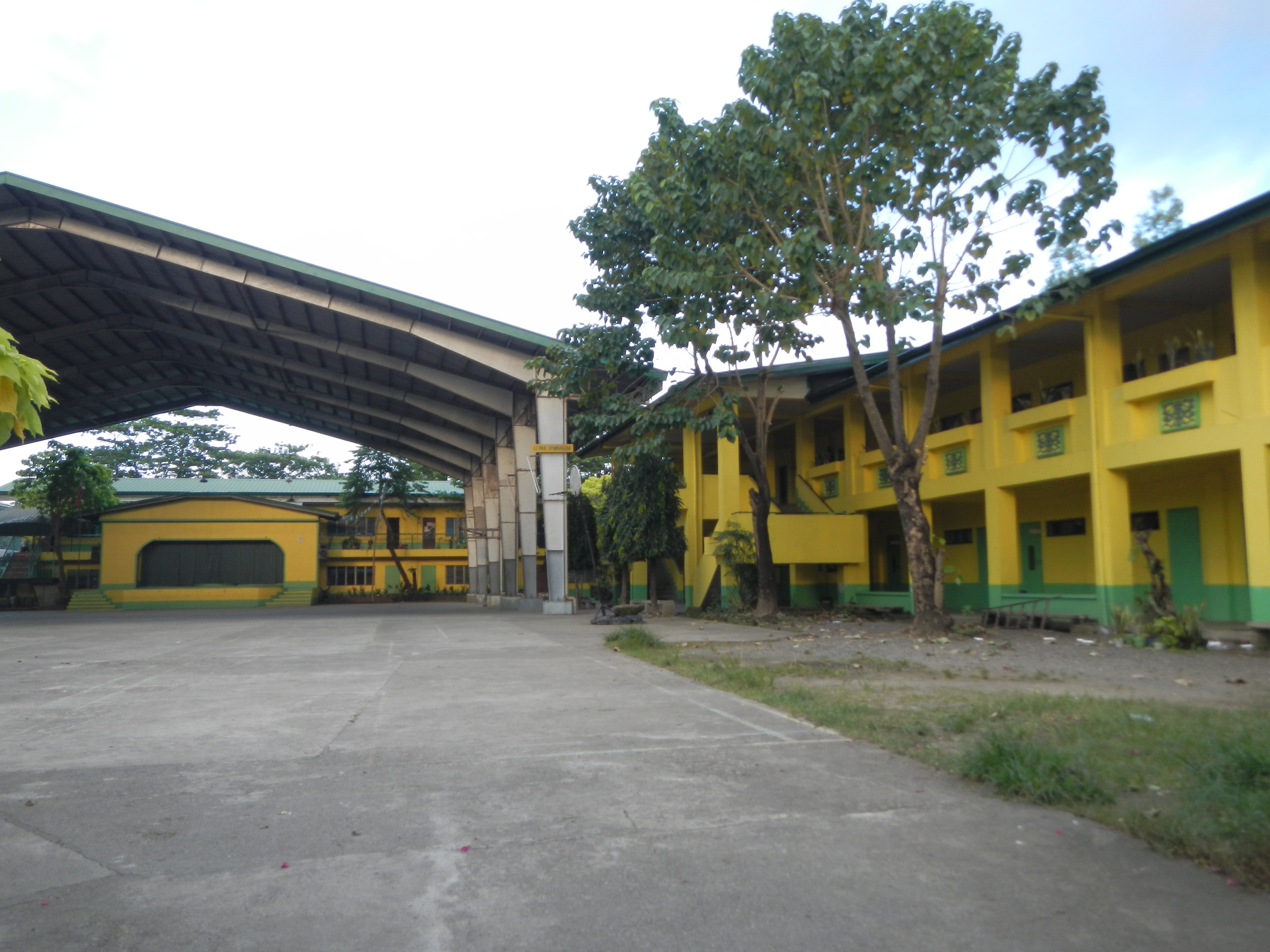
Saint Paul School, the interior

St. Paul School, the first and only Catholic school in San Antonio, Nueva Ecija had its humble beginning in 1969. It was the same year when Bishop Vicente P. Reyes of Cabanatuan requested the Provincial Sisters of St. Paul of Chartres (SPC) to manage the school. The four SPC sisters: Sr. Caritas de St. Paul Sevilla, Sr. Mary Asella Cariaga, Sr. Marie Edissa Conel and Sr. Jeanne de Rossaire Marquez left St. Paul College of Manila to open the first Catholic school in San Antonio. The Superior and College Dean respectively of St. Paul College of San Miguel together with the Provincial Assistant for Education, Rev. Fr. Pedro Balagtas who was then the parish priest of San Antonio had collaboration in preparing the necessary papers and facilities for that school year. From then on, it paved the foundation of St. Paul School. The school opened on June 17, 1969 with 32 kindergarten pupils and 88 students in the first year high school using the old rectory. In 1971, new classrooms were added to accommodate the growing school population. During that time the school had kindergarten, Grades I, and II and the first three years of high school. Grade levels and high school levels were added during each succeeding school year to complete all stages

Sr. Mechtilde Seva, SPC, became the Superior, High School Principal from 1978 to 1986, followed by Sr. Mary George Siriban, SPC, from 1986 to 1989, Sr. Jovita Pe Benito, SPC in 1992 while Sr. Lutgard of the Sacred Heart Ramirez, SPC was appointed as school head and principal from 1996 up to 2006. It was during the term of Sr. Lutgard of the Sacred Heart Ramirez, SPC, that St. Paul School of San Antonio enrollment increased yearly. During the management of Sr. Lutgard of the Sacred Heart Ramirez, SPC additional buildings were constructed. Side by side to these were also renovations to old classrooms. The timeworn gym was converted to classrooms and the floor level served as the school canteen. A new gym was constructed between St. Anthony Abbot Bldg. and the old rectory, now named Bishop Vicente P. Reyes D.D. Bldg., together with the school stage.

In June, 2006 to 2009 Sr. Myrna B. Castante, SPC served as School Head and Principal. Sr. Myrna initiated important changes. The salary scale was regularized together with the instrument for Performance Evaluation. All school employees, teaching and non-teaching staff were given specific job description for a very proficient performance of their tasks. Documentations and records were professionalized. Subject Area Leaders and Year Level Coordinators were appointed. Offices were properly designated to serve better stakeholders, parents, teachers and students.

The Elementary and High School Level had a separate computer laboratory which were maintained and staffed by the Office of the School's Computer Expert, Mr. Cyrus Ecle. For a better communication within the campus, a public paging system was installed with help of the FPTA. School Year 2008–2009 was declared as the Pauline Year. To highlight the celebration, a new statue of St. Paul our School Patron was built. The sacred monument of St. Paul was placed in front of the gym symbolizing that the Patron Saint blesses everyone.

On May 15, 2009, Sr. Nora Giron, SPC was appointed principal for the following school year 2009–2010.

The SPC sisters made their exit in May 2010 and the school administration was turned over to the Diocese of Cabanatuan. The Superintendent of Catholic Schools, Rev. Fr. Michael Feliciano I. Veneracion officiated at the Holy Mass and introduced to the school community the newly appointed director and principal Rev. Msgr. Felipe L. Dayao, Jr. His service to the academe was terminated when he died on March 28, 2013, due to Cardiac Arrest.

Rev. Fr. Michael Feliciano I. Veneracion succeeded the position of the late Msgr. Dayao on April 5, 2013. He went to the campus on April 12 and approved the renovation of gymnasium of the campus that summer.

However, in June 2014, Mrs. Jovita P. Villas was appointed by Bishop Sofronio Bancud, SSS, DD as the new directress of the school up to this date.

== Campus ==
- Bishop V. Reyes Building is the first and largest building in the campus. It was named after Bishop Vicente Reyes, the founder of the school. It houses the principal's and director's office, registrar office, finance office, guidance office, faculty, clinic (shared with grade 12 GAS), alumni office, elementary library, audio visual room, and classrooms (kindergarten, one grade 2, grades 3–7, two senior high)
- Saint Anthony Abbot Building is located on the east part of the campus. It houses classrooms (three grade 8 and all grade 9), science laboratory, and high school library
- Our Lady of Chartres Building is located on the north, behind the stage of the campus. It houses classrooms (five grade 8 and all grade 10)
- Pere Chauvet Building is located near the Bishop V. Reyes Building, and is the latest building founded in the campus. It houses the school canteen, computer laboratories, and classrooms (a grade 2 and senior high)
- Our Lady of Divina Pastora Building is a one-storey building that houses grade one classrooms and is located near the Pere Chauvet Building.
- School Convent is the former residence of Sisters of St. Paul de Chatres and is located beside Pere Chauvet Building. It houses the TLE (Technology and Livelihood Education) room and residence of some employees that were far from home.
