= Gilles Plains, South Australia =

Gilles Plains
- Suburb
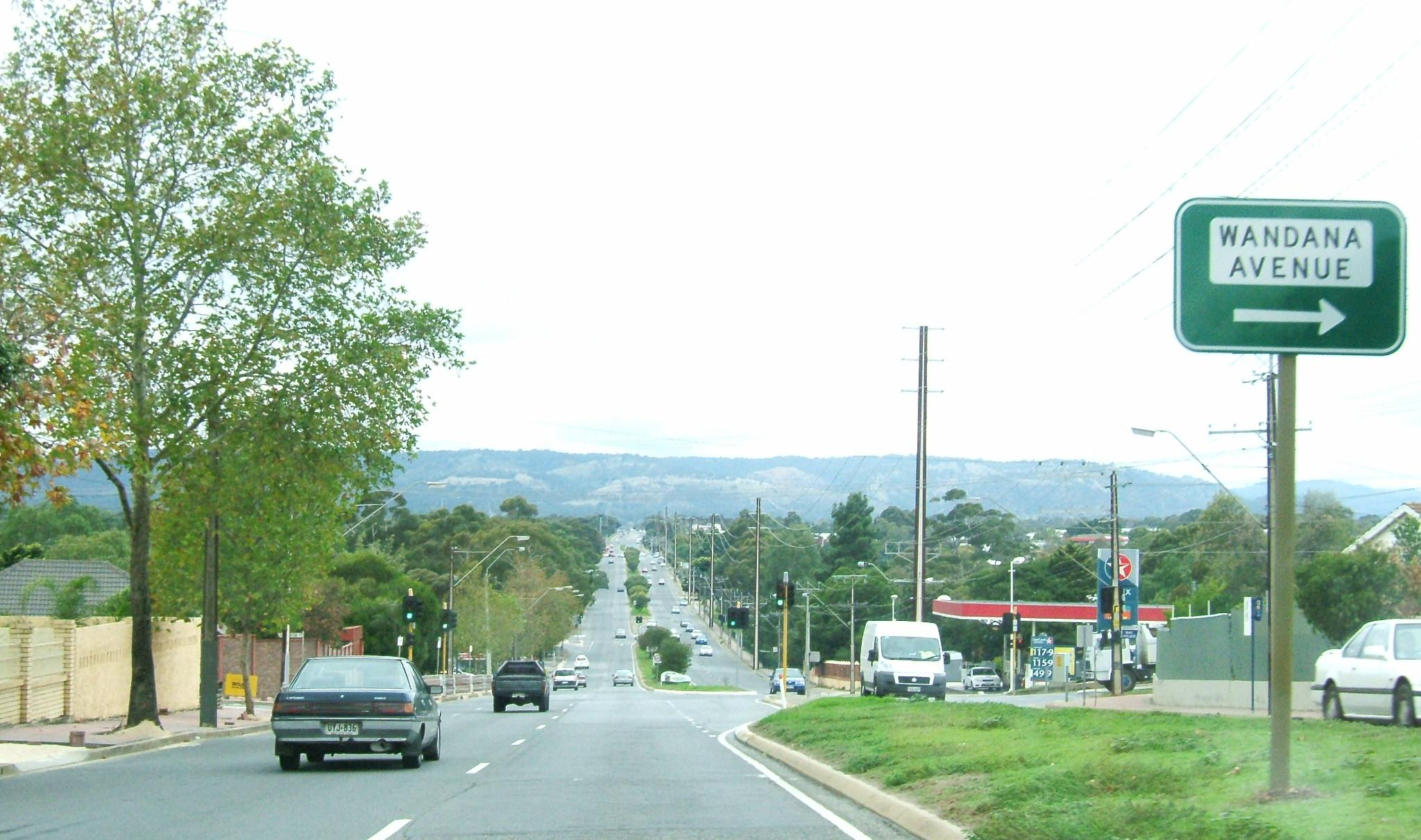
- Looking east along Grand Junction Road. Gilles Plains is on the right.

- Country: Australia
- State: South Australia
- City: Adelaide
- LGA: City of Tea Tree Gully

Government
  - State electorate: Port Adelaide
  - Federal division: Sturt

Population
  - Total: 4,101 (SAL 2021)
- Postcode: 5086
Suburbs around Gilles Plains
Walkley Heights	Valley View
Oakden	Gilles Plains	Holden Hill
Hillcrest	Windsor Gardens

Gilles Plains /ˈɡɪləs/ is a suburb of Adelaide, South Australia. It lies approximately 10 km (6.2 mi) north-east of the Adelaide central business district.

== History ==
The suburb is named after the first Colonial Treasurer, Osmond Gilles, who owned a sheep station adjoining the Torrens River. In early 1838, this was the furthest station from the city of Adelaide in the Colony of South Australia. Gilles was a major investor in the new colony, and imported Saxony and merino sheep for the first time.

The suburb was created by carving off part of Hillcrest.

The area was predominantly a hay-growing area through its early years. In 1874, it had the largest hay farm in South Australia, which was owned by the German-born Johann Wilhelm Albrecht Sudholz (1821–1903), who arrived in the colony in 1846. He was a very successful farmer, and was the first to grow wheat for fodder, binding it in sheaves when green, and then cutting it into chaff. He was a co-founder of the Lutheran Church in Flinders Street in the city.

== Location and government ==
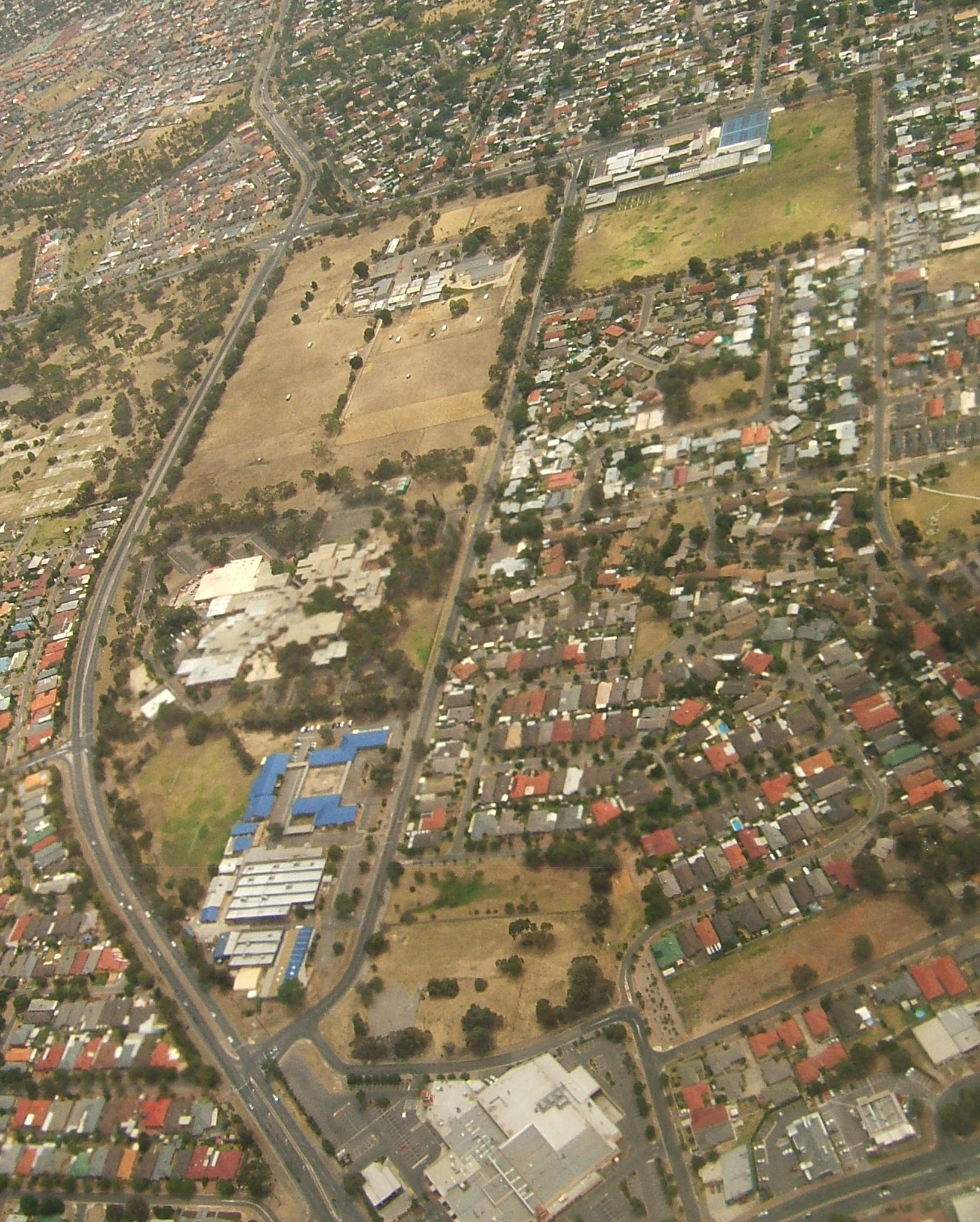
Aerial image of western part of Gilles Plains, looking north. Grand Junction Road is the east–west road at the top; Sudholz Road, the north–south road at left; Valley View to the north; Oakden to the west. The green and concrete rectangle to the top right is St Paul's College. The white-roofed complex to the south is a TAFE complex, and the blue and white part further down is the Royal Society for the Blind. The white complex at the bottom is a shopping centre.

Gilles Plains lies approximately 10 km (6.2 mi) north-east of the Adelaide central business district. It is bordered on the eastern side by Sudholz Road, which was named after J. W. A. Sudholz. Grand Junction Road forms its northern border, with North East Road to the south. Surrounding suburbs are Walkley Heights, Valley View, Oakden, Holden Hill, Hillcrest, and Windsor Gardens.

Gilles Plains is in both the City of Port Adelaide Enfield and City of Tea Tree Gully local government areas, and is in both the South Australian House of Assembly electoral districts of Florey and Torrens.

It is also in the Australian House of Representatives Division of Sturt.

== Education ==
Pinnacle College is a non-denominational R-12 private school on Wandana Avenue. It was established at this location as Burc College in 2005 by the McYess Foundation, opening with 25 students. A second campus opened in Elizabeth East in 2010, and the school changed its name to Pinnacle College in 2016. in January 2019 a third campus opened in Golden Grove.

St Paul's College is a private R-12 Catholic school on Grand Junction Road.

Wandana Primary School is a state primary school (preschool to year 6) on Cowra Avenue.

Note: The former Gilles Plains Primary School, founded in 1901, was located at 489B North East Road in Hillcrest. Gilles Plains High School was founded in Windsor Gardens in 1960. The two schools were merged to form Avenues College on the site of the high school, with new building work completed in 2020; its official opening took place in January 2023.

There is a TAFE SA college at 33 Blacks Road in Gilles Plains that offers a range of vocational courses, including aged care, veterinary nursing, childcare, nursing, and laboratory skills.
