= St. Paul High School =

St. Paul High School may refer to:

== Canada ==
- St. Paul High School (Ottawa), Nepean, Ontario
- Saint Paul Catholic High School, Niagara Falls, Ontario

== United States ==
- St. Paul High School (Arkansas), St. Paul, Arkansas
- St. Paul High School (Santa Fe Springs, California)
- St. Paul Catholic High School, Bristol, Connecticut
- St. Paul High School, St. Paul, Kansas
- St. Paul High School (Grosse Pointe Farms, Michigan)
- St. Paul High School (Nebraska), a high school in St. Paul, Nebraska
- St. Paul High School (Ohio), Norwalk, Ohio
- St. Paul High School (Oregon), St. Paul, Oregon
- St. Paul High School (Shiner, Texas)
- St. Paul High School (Virginia), St. Paul, Virginia

== See also ==
- St. Paul's High School (disambiguation)
- St. Paul's School (disambiguation)
- Saint Paul (disambiguation)
