= South Australian Housing Trust =

Australian state government agency

Agency overview
- Formed: 1936
- Jurisdiction: Government of South Australia
- Agency executive: Hon Nick Champion MP
- Website: https://www.housing.sa.gov.au/

The South Australian Housing Trust (SAHT) is an independent statutory authority originally established by the Government of South Australia responsible for providing low-cost rental housing to working people and their families, as a means of supporting industrial development in the state prior to World War II. Following the end of the war its role expanded to become a large-scale developer and public housing authority, but since the 1980s this has been curtailed. From the early 2000s to 1 July 2018 SAHT Services were administered through Housing SA, a division within the Department for Human Services. From 1 July 2018 Housing SA and Renewal SA were merged into the South Australian Housing Authority.

== History ==
South Australia's Liberal and Country League (LCL) government established the SAHT as Australia's first state housing authority in 1936. It was conceived not as a means of improving living standards through improved housing or town planning but as a tool in the government's emerging plan for attracting industrial investment by keeping labour costs below those in the main rival states of New South Wales (NSW) and Victoria. This role was most developed during Thomas Playford's 26 years as LCL premier (1938–1965). Playford supported the expansion of the SAHT as a major state enterprise and as a key instrument in the economic policies initiated by his predecessor as premier, Richard Layton Butler.

As these policies were principally concerned with promoting industrial development and population growth, their effects were concentrated on Adelaide. Most scholars acknowledge that the main outcome of Playford's administration was a hastened rate of industrialisation. Rather than industrialisation itself, the most tangible outcome of Playford era policies was a new metropolitan Adelaide. A role as urban developer was implicit in the trust's founding purpose of constructing workers' cottages on a scale sufficient to restrain rents in Adelaide generally and stimulate the private building industry. From its inauguration in 1937, the SAHT board embarked upon a wider metropolitan planning role in its selection of sites for housing estates. These inadvertent urban planning roles became more self-conscious and more extensive from the late 1940s as Playford supported industrial development by creating or greatly expanding state enterprises such as the Electricity Trust of South Australia and the SAHT. The urban policy role of the SAHT was part of the government's strategies of general industrial development. The undertaking of explicitly urban development roles was also due to the restructuring of the SAHT during the mid-1940s, with additional staff and responsibilities, a new chairman (Jack Cartledge) and general manager (Alex Ramsay). Cartledge and Ramsay were highly intelligent and capable men who created the post-war organisation with its pervasive powers and directed the SAHT for the remaining years of the Playford government. Both men were conscious of the role of the SAHT in determining the overall direction of urban growth, and not merely contributing to it.

=== Post-World War II ===
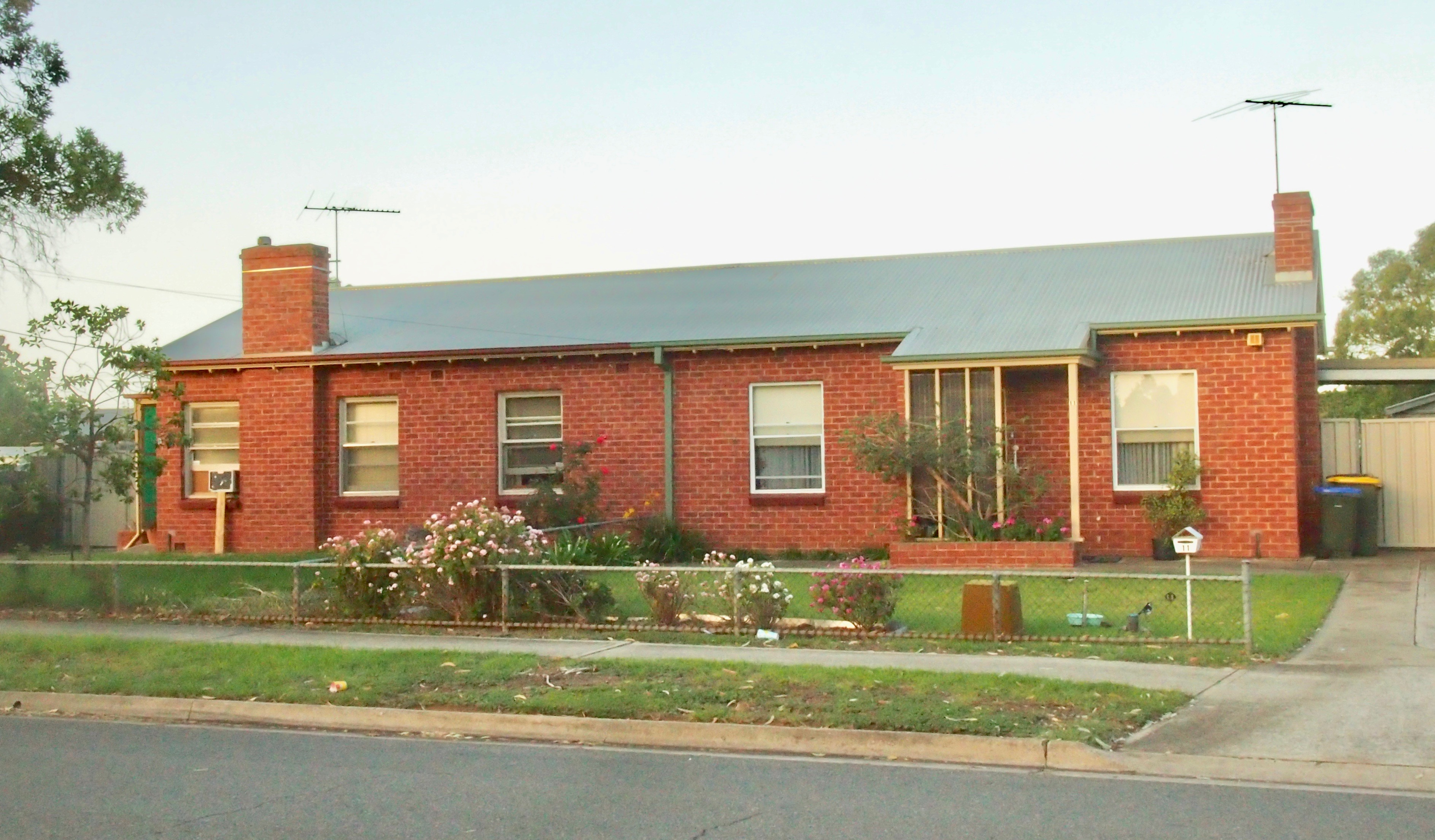
SAHT semi-detached cottages, from the late 1940s at Seaton, showing little exterior modification of the original design

After the Second World War the trust became one of the most powerful state authorities. Many new activities were supported by Playford, which enabled the SAHT to act as a total development authority, so that it could foster new suburban areas, industrial and economic development, and population expansion. The SAHT thus operated as "metropolitan planner" at several levels simultaneously: as formal town planner (at Elizabeth); as de facto metropolitan planner, integrating factory development and housing and extending the suburbs; and as a major state planner, particularly in relation to industrialisation and immigration. The architect G. R. Shedley was a major contributor to this program.

=== 1950s "austerity" housing ===
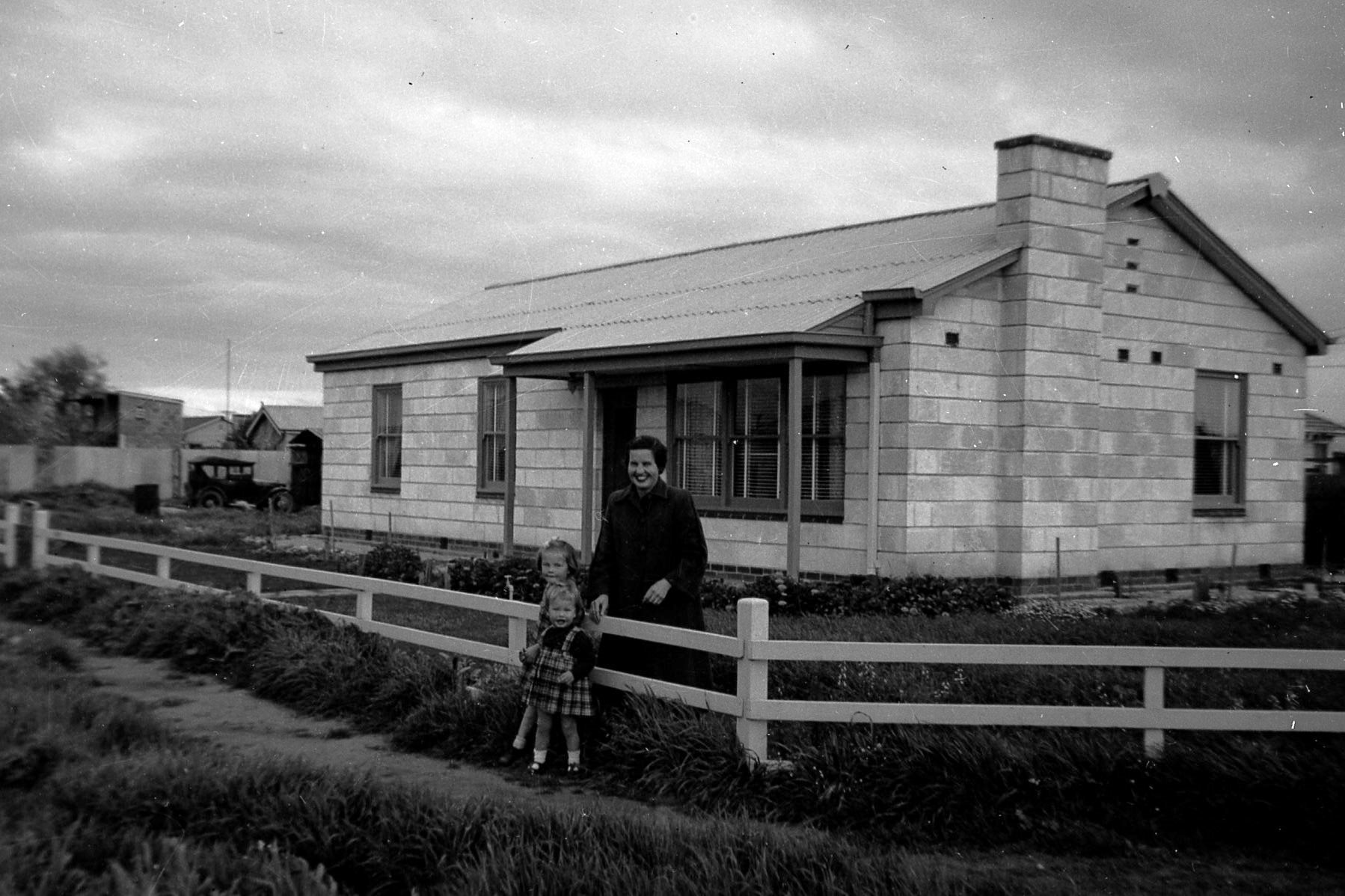
New SAHT home July 1951

The Housing Trust built a great number of basic homes to 15 different plans for purchase by qualifying families, and were targeted at self-reliant young couples filling the new jobs in manufacturing created by Playford's policies. The houses were little more than shells, with the new owners fitting them out as time, energy and finances permitted.

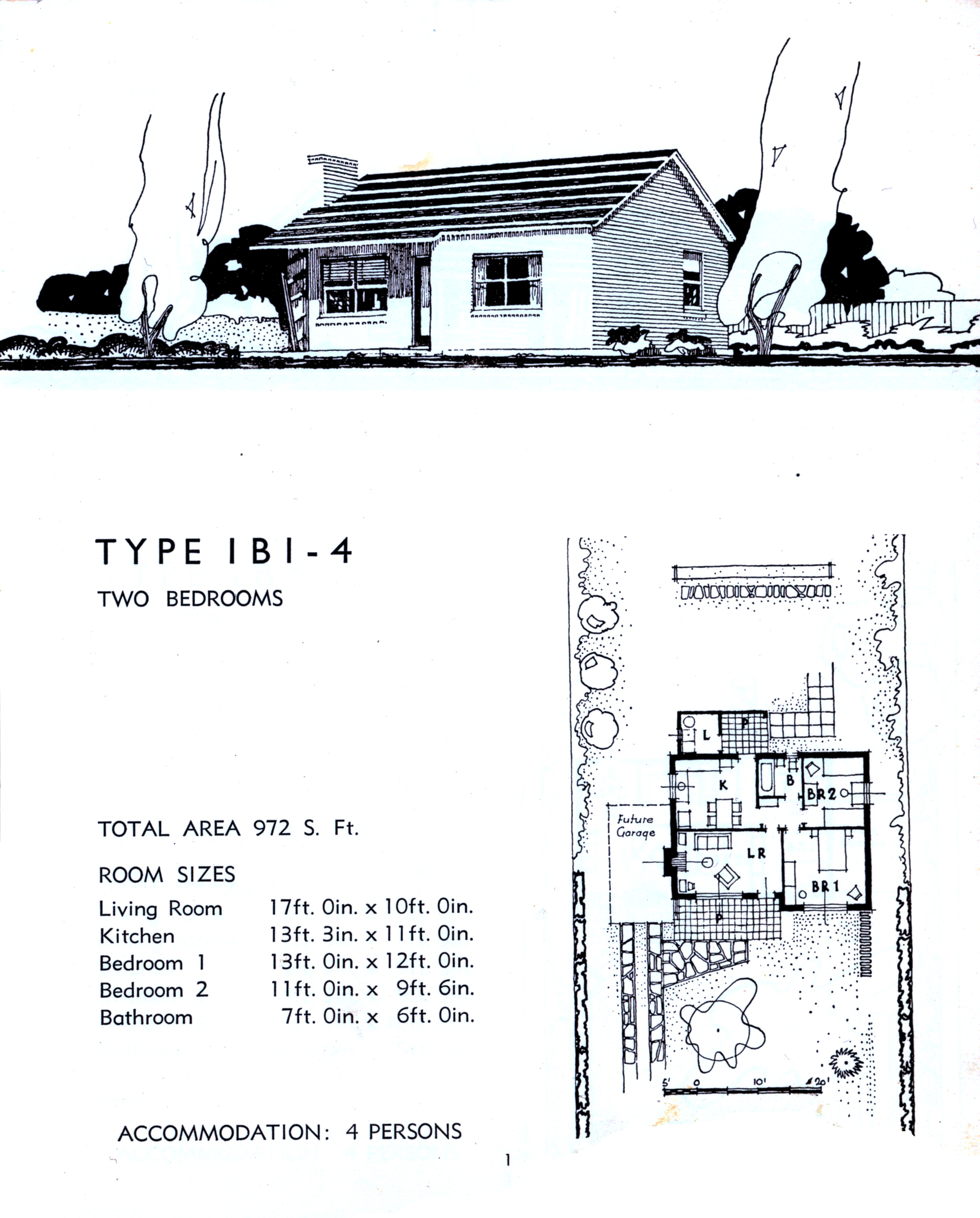

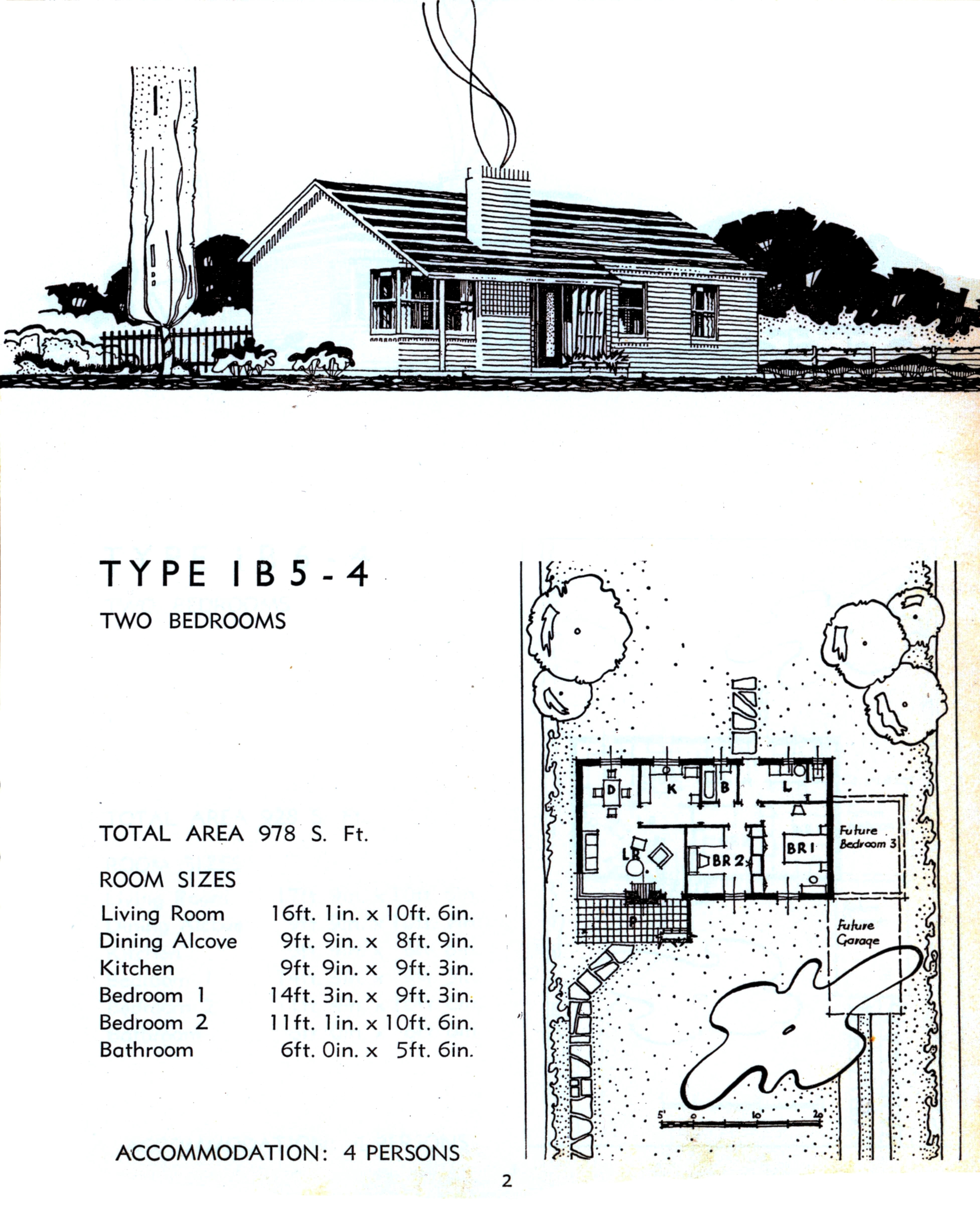

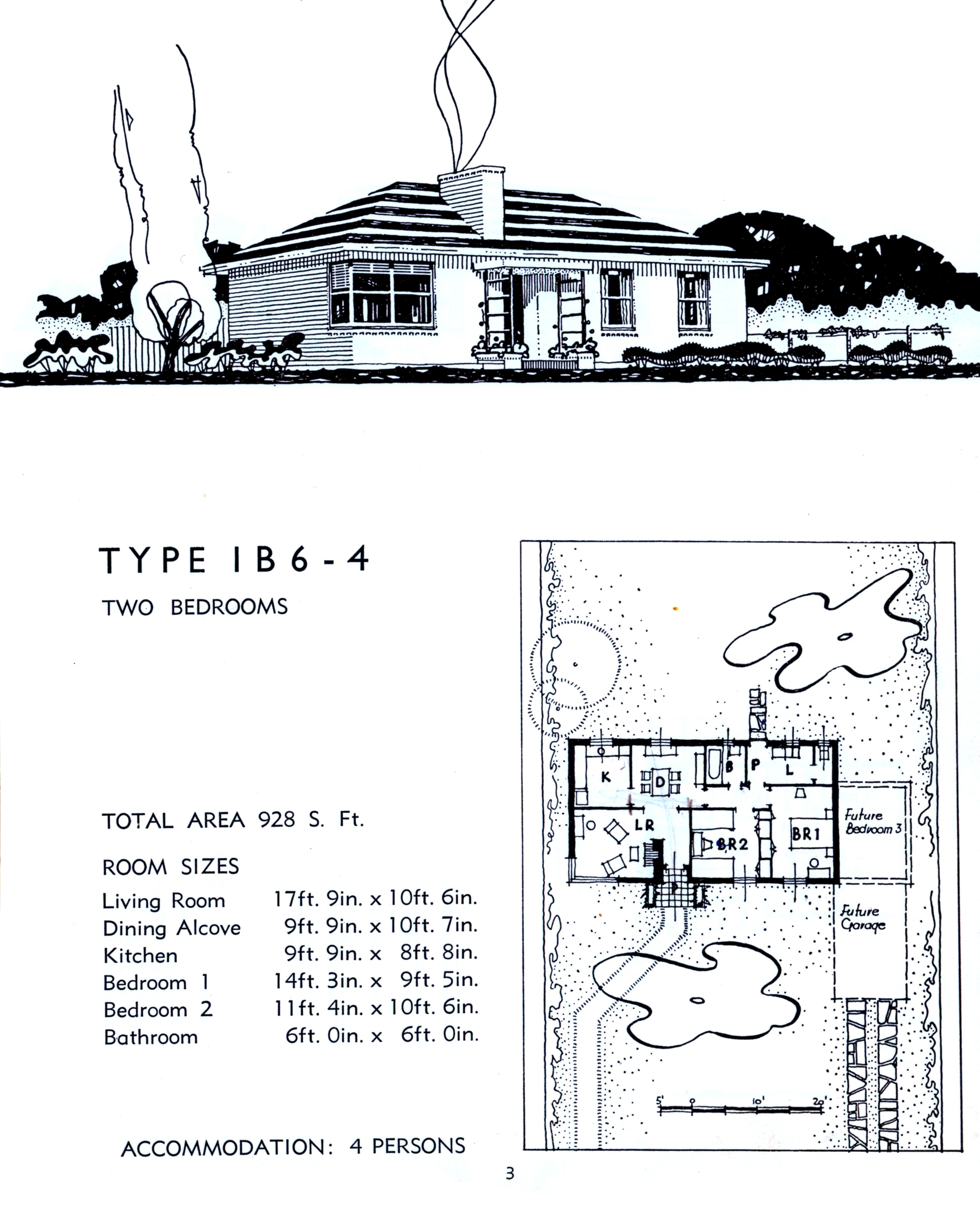

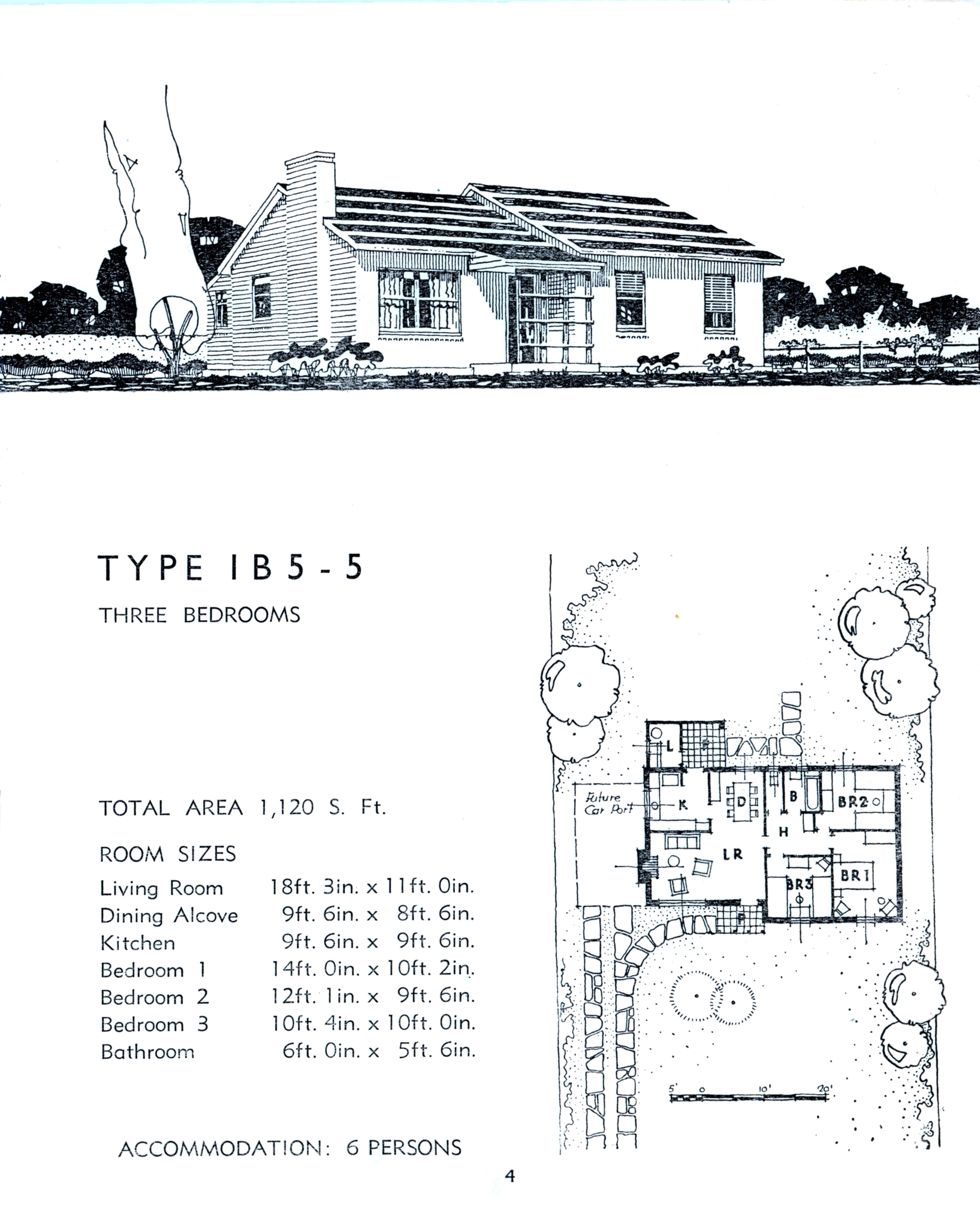

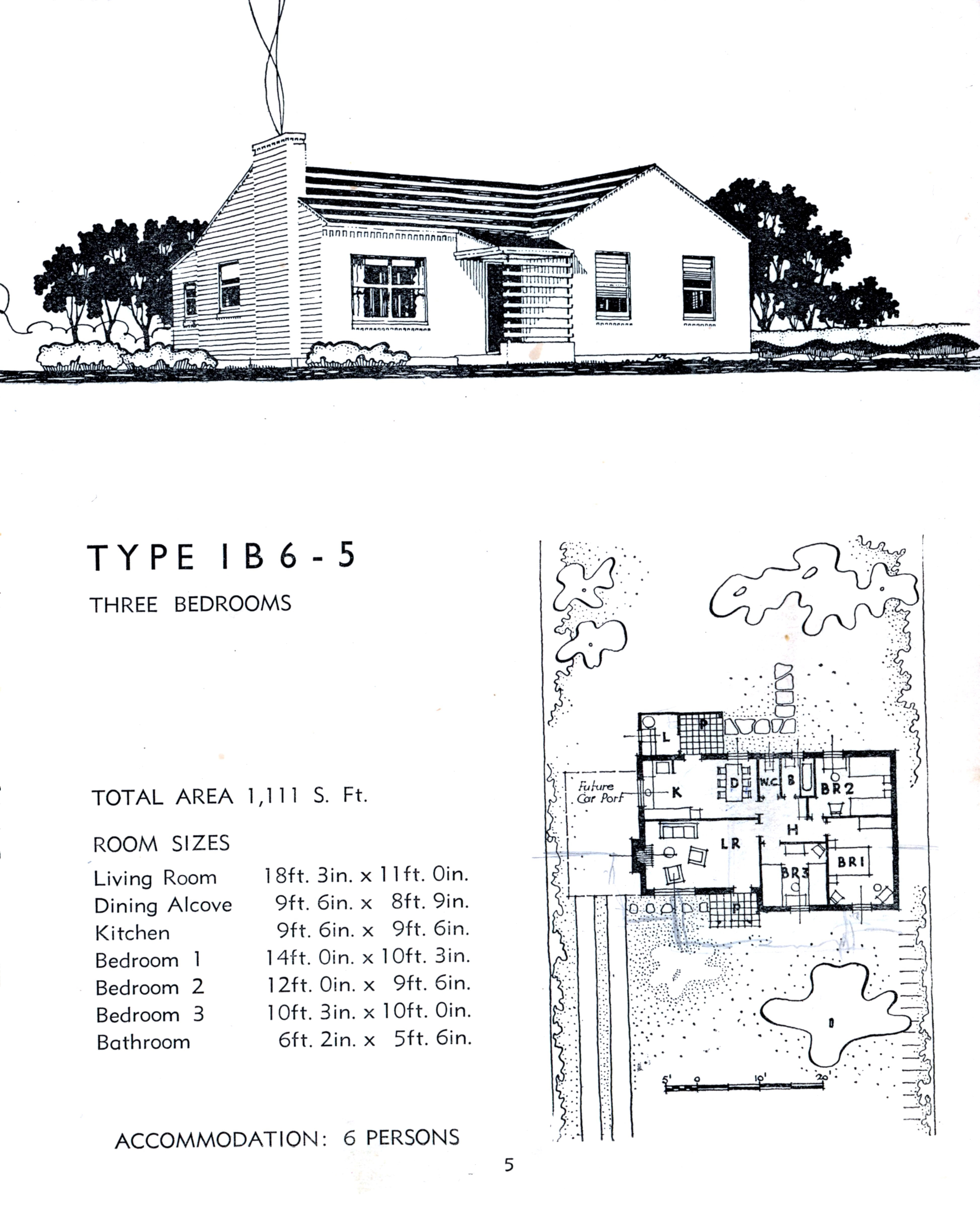

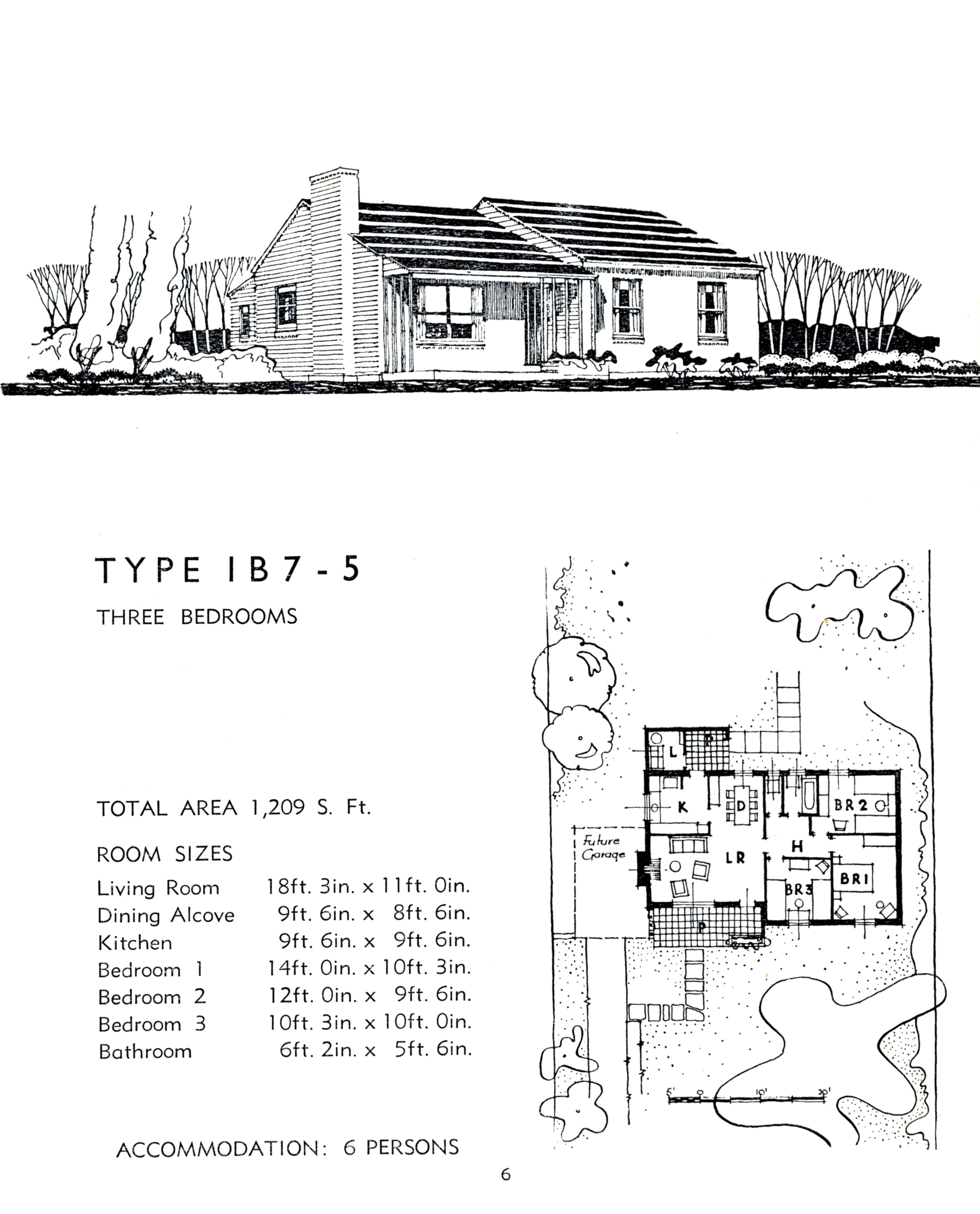

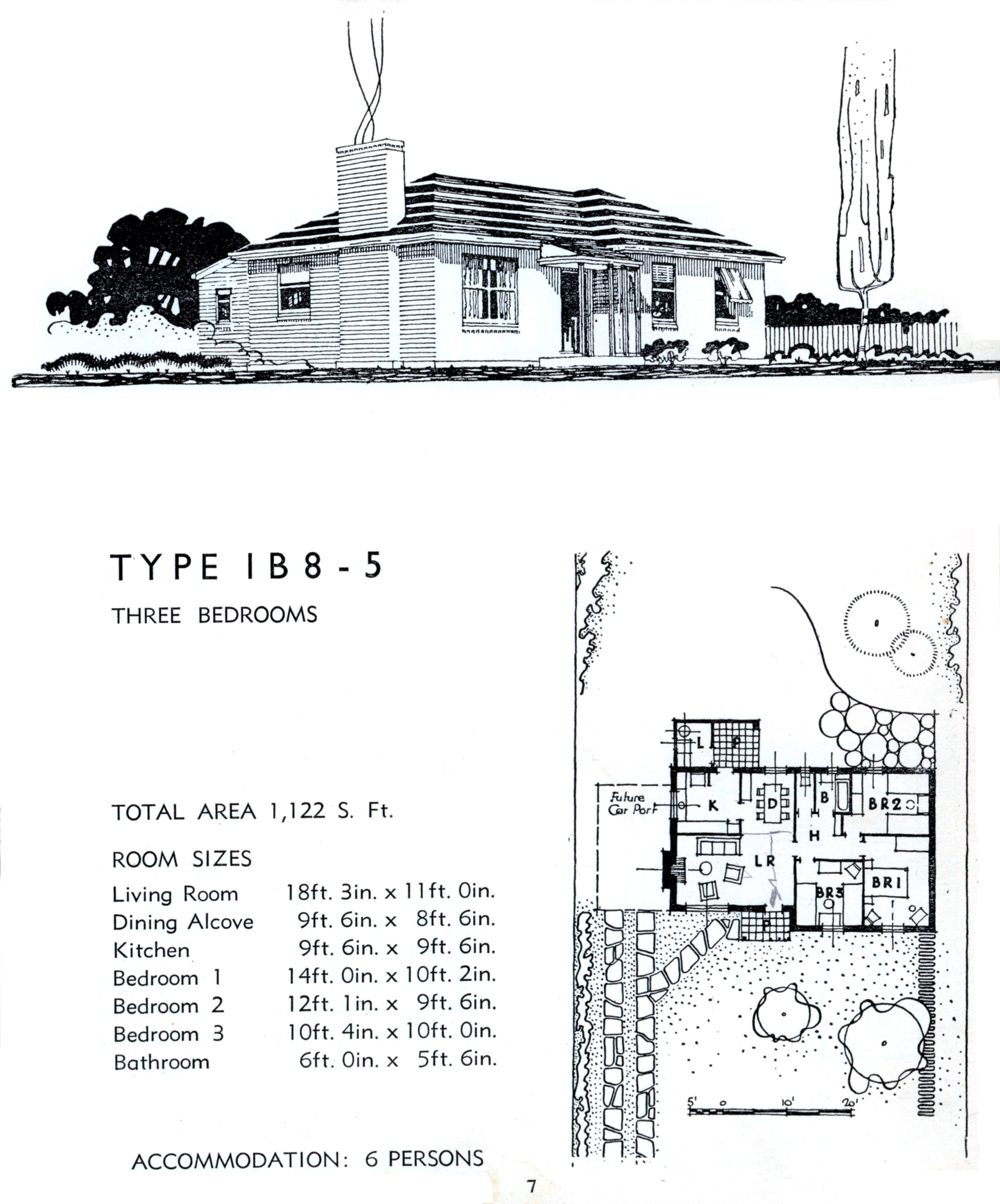

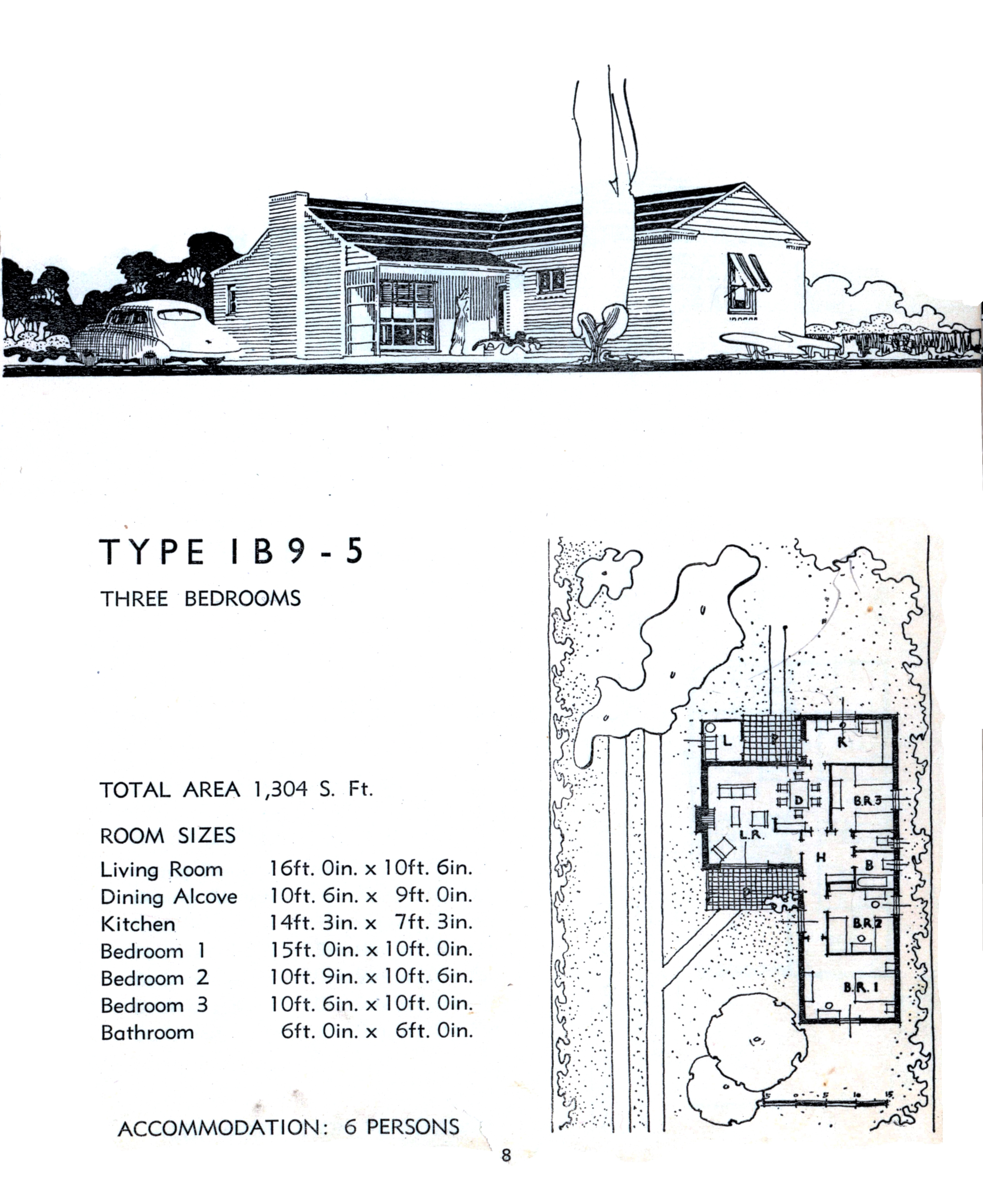

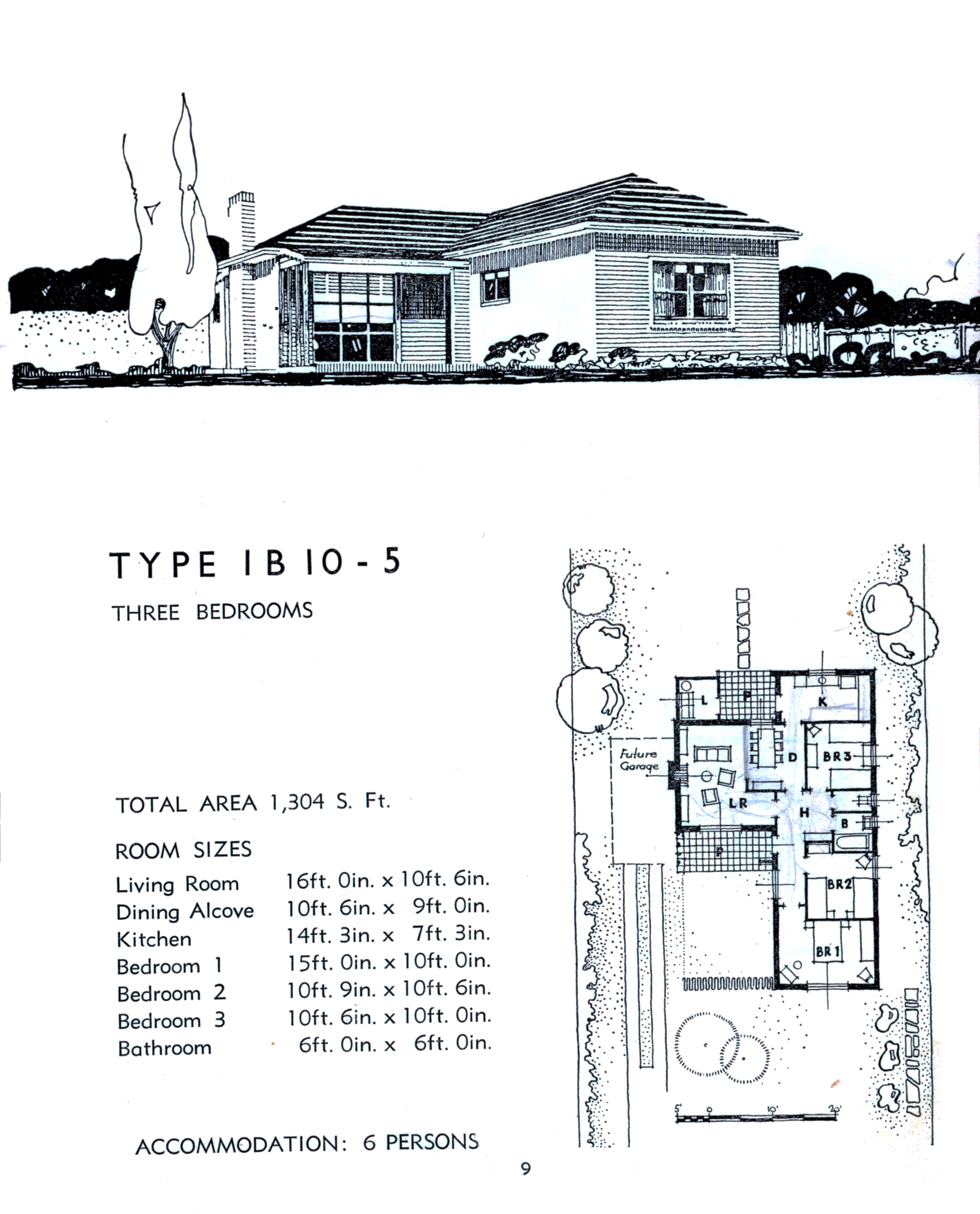

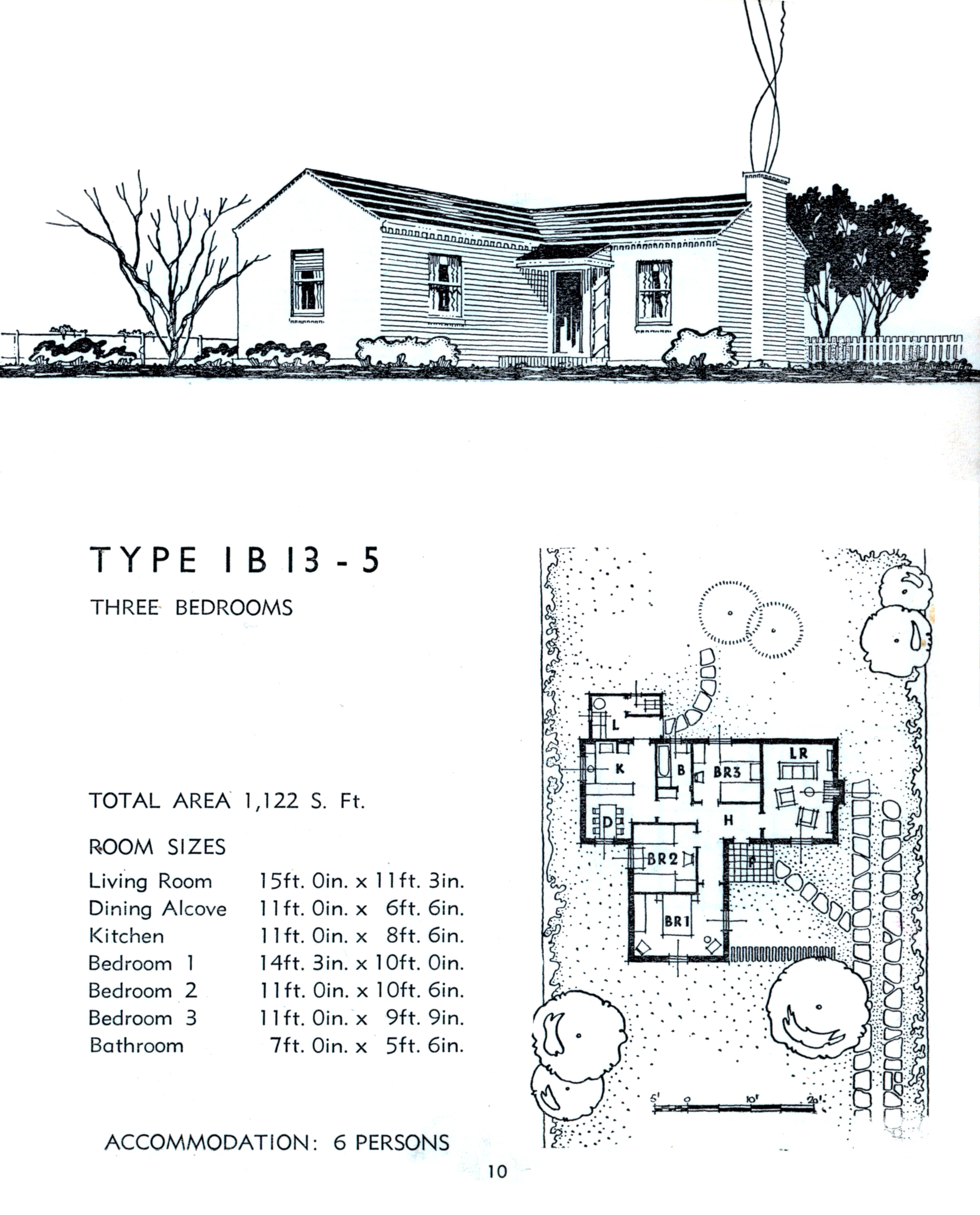

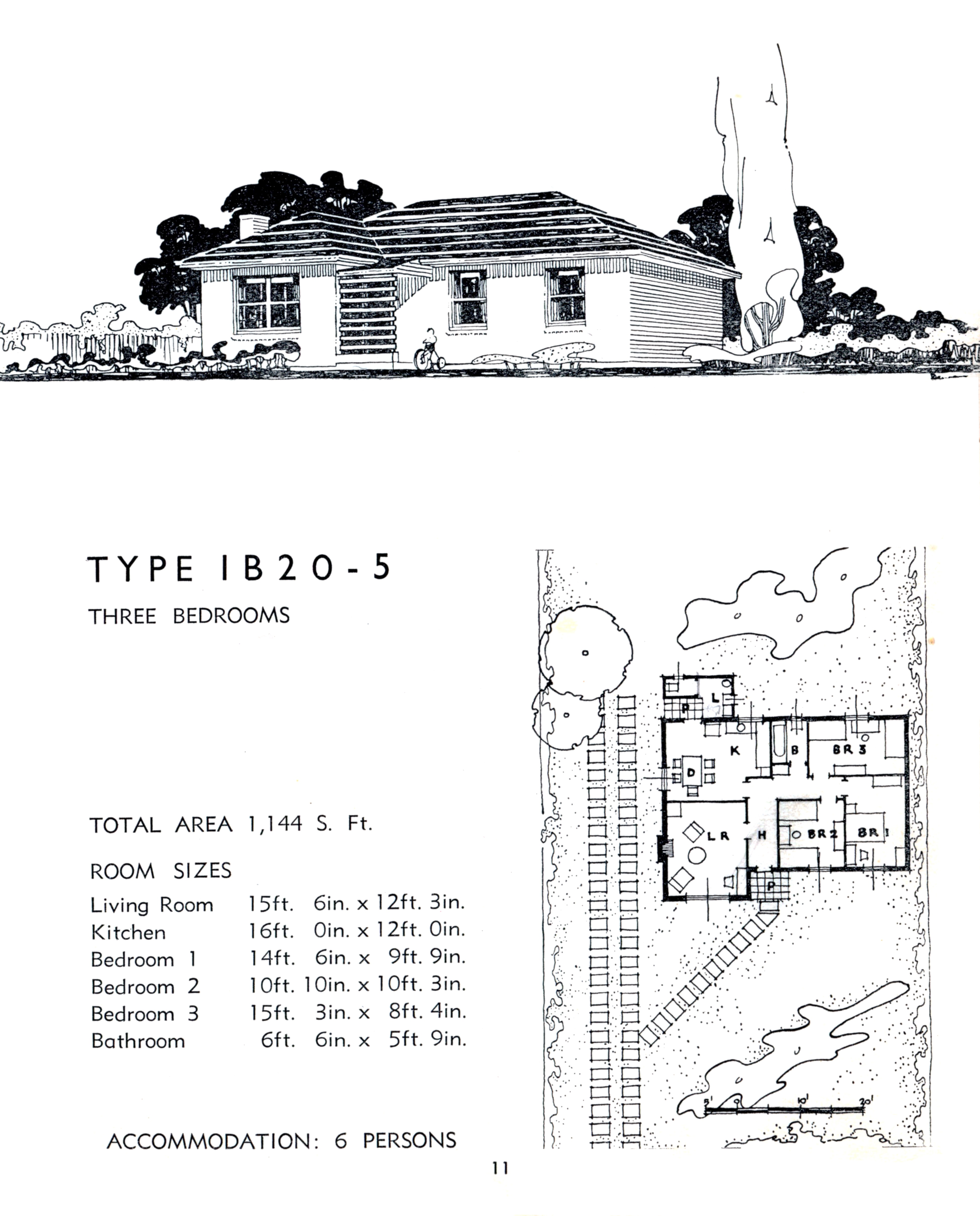

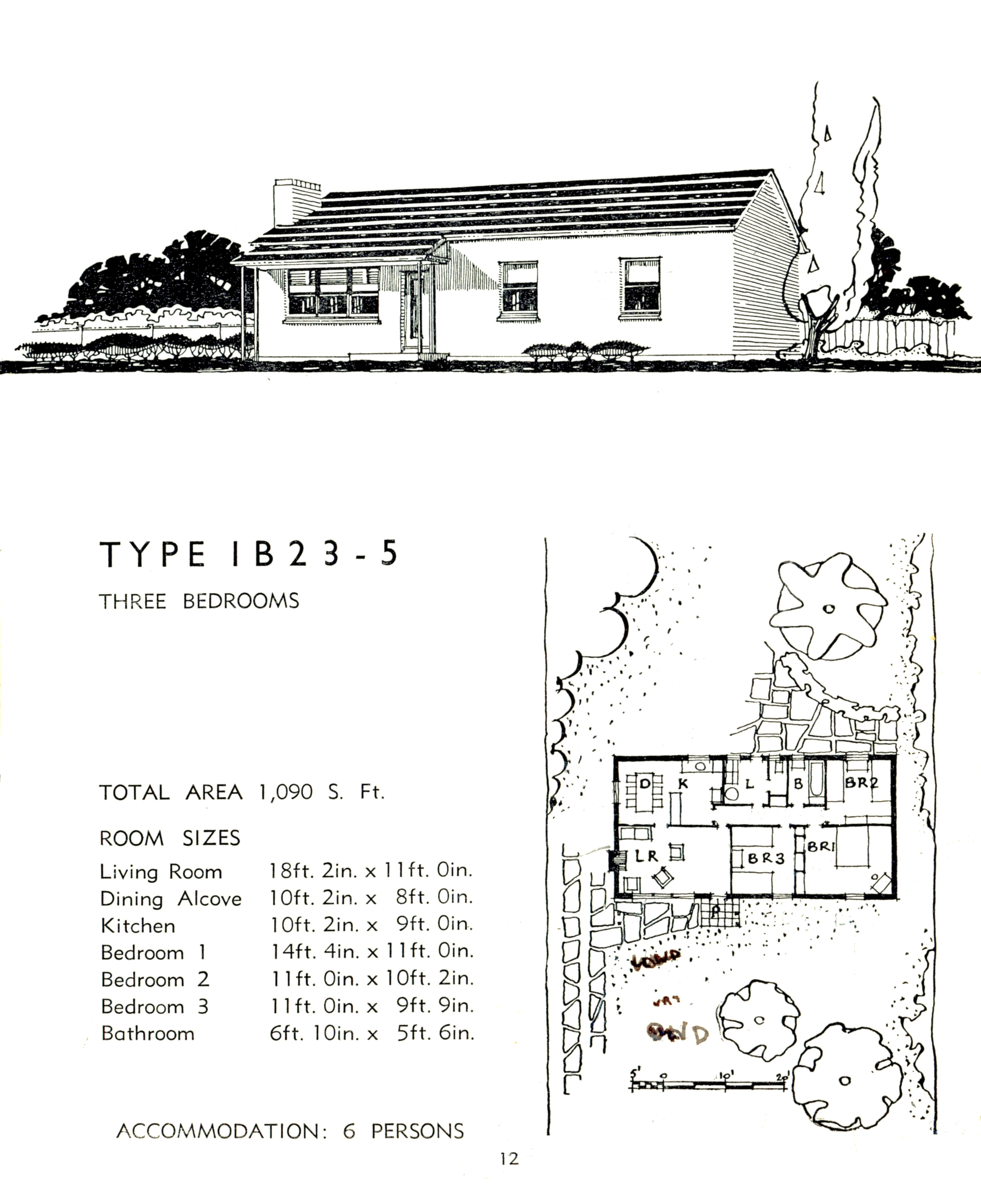

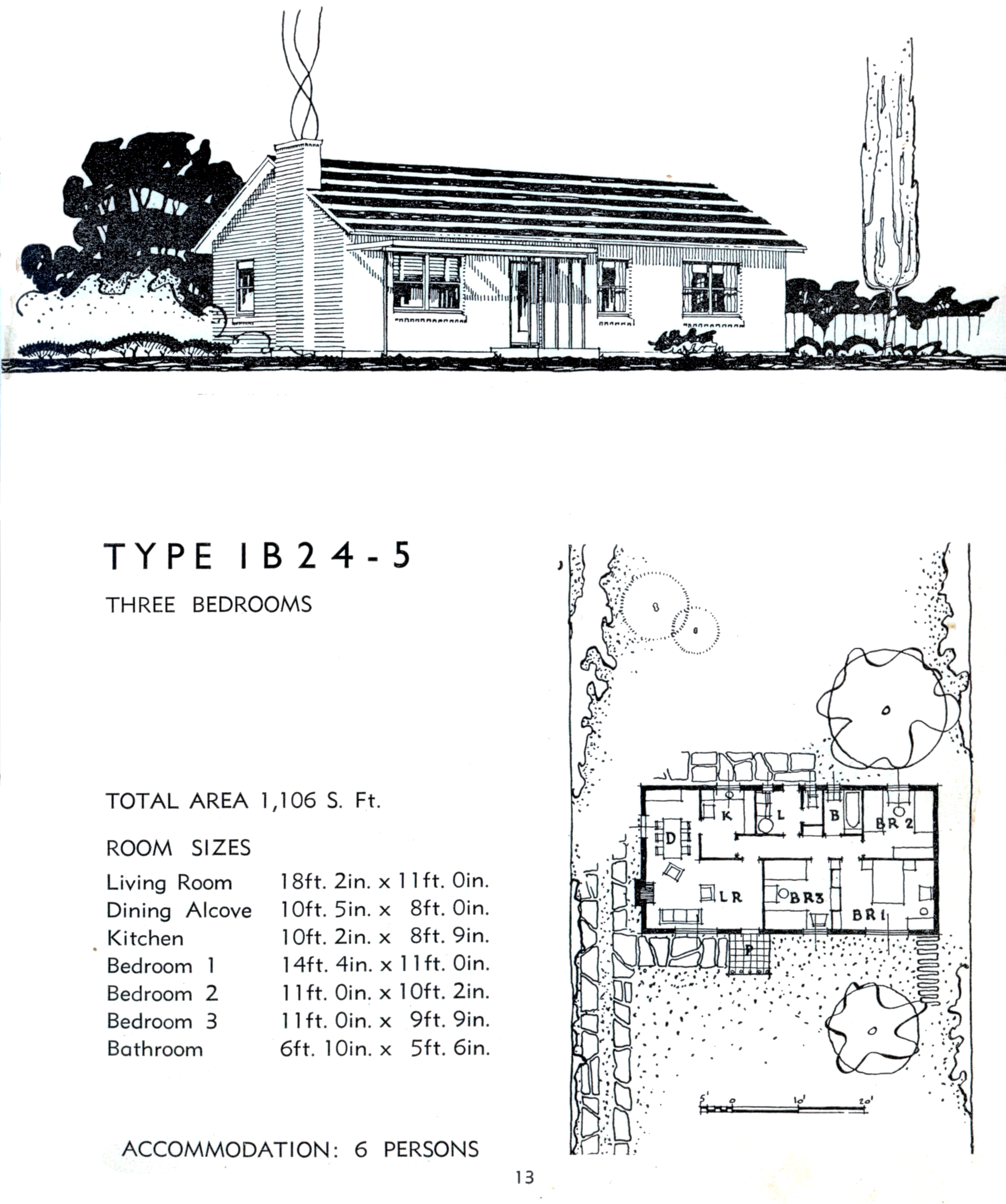

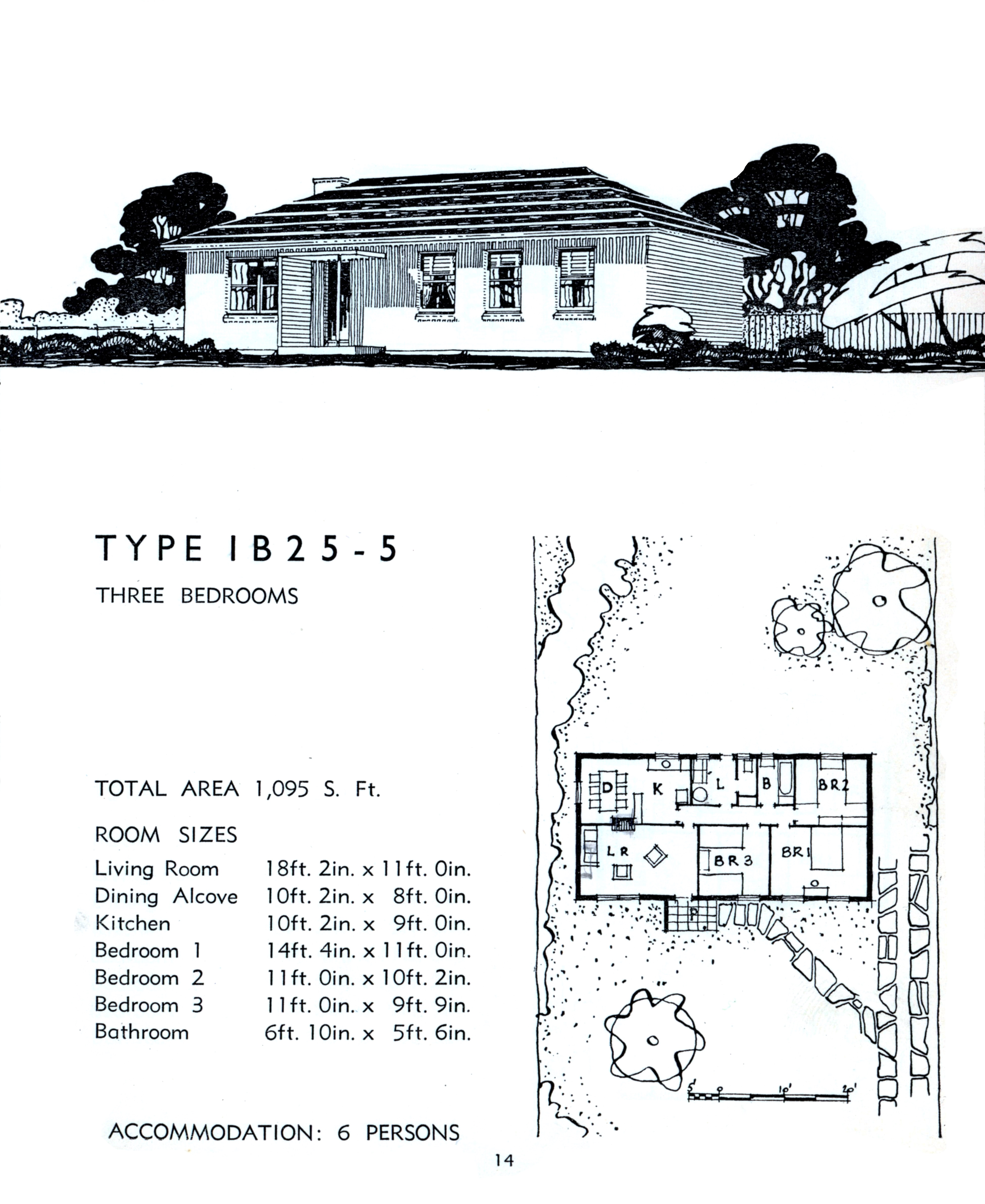

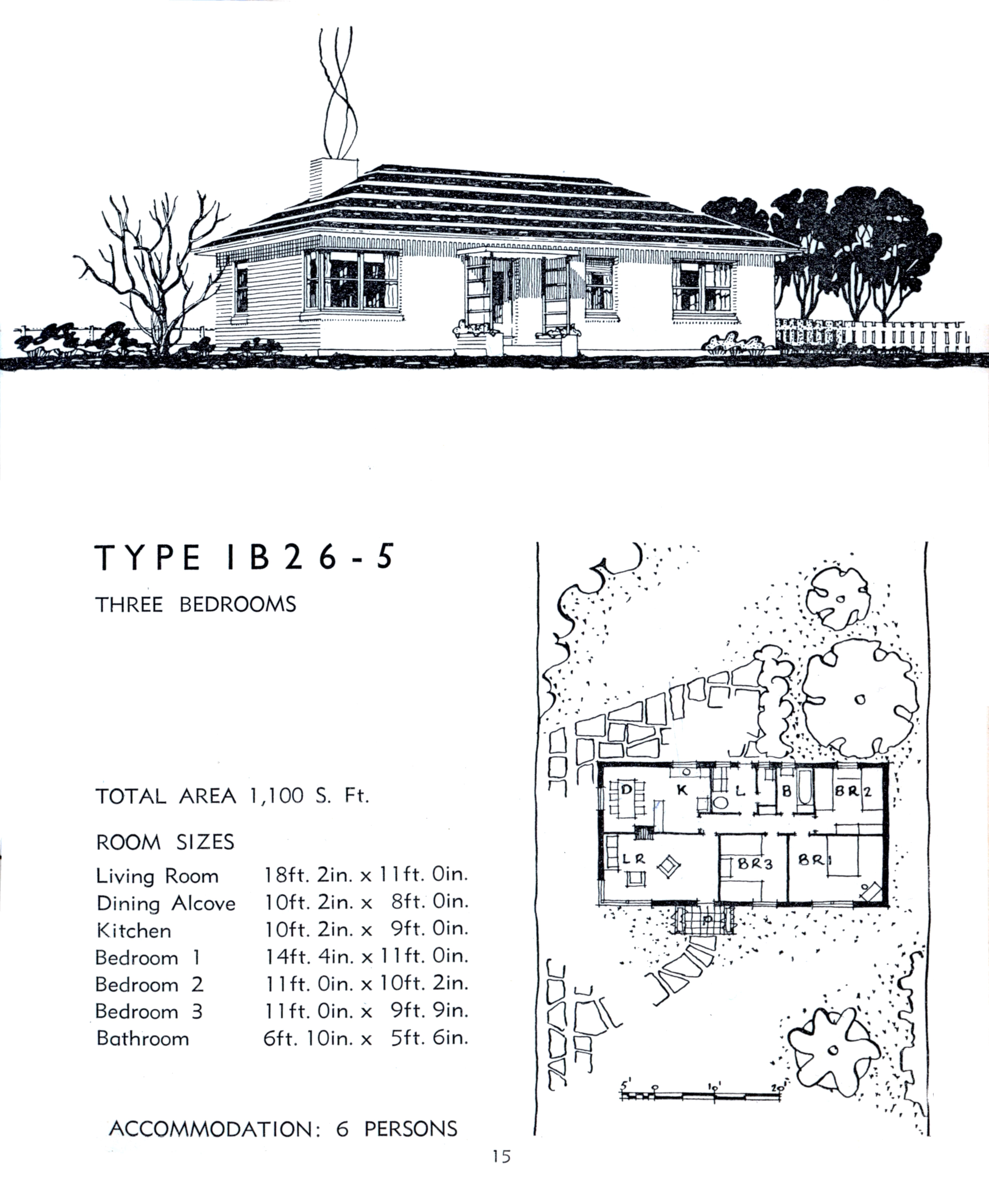

To these were added a set of "mirror image" plans, and further variety was achieved by specifying different roofing materials: tiles, of either cement or terracotta, or corrugated sheets, of either galvanized iron or asbestos cement. Most houses were built of brick, the outer walls being of cavity construction with the outer skin either brick or Mount Gambier stone. On land with reactive "Bay of Biscay" soil, the plans were executed in brick veneer construction.

=== 1960s–late 1990s ===
The Trust's wide roles as a large-scale developer and public housing authority were curtailed from the late 1980s. The statutory authority also came under departmental control, at first under the Department of Human Services, and from 2004 under the Department for Families and Communities. In its 70th year the functions of the SAHT were taken over by Housing SA, a division within that department.

=== Early 2000s to present ===
The SA Housing Trust Board reports to the minister responsible for the relevant department, the Department for Families and Communities, which was later renamed as the Department for Communities and Social Inclusion, and, following the March 2018 state election, again renamed as the Department for Human Services.

In 2004, the way in which SAHT services were delivered changed. Houses are still owned by SAHT, however, maintenance and tenant relations is now handled by Housing SA, and upgrades/renewal projects are being delivered from the early 2010s onwards by Renewal SA, both of which report to Cabinet through the minister.

In the 2010s some SAHT houses were demolished and rebuilt as part of the '1 Thousand Homes in 1000 Days' program. In some areas, management and ownership of homes has been transferred to non-government service organisations.

In July 2024, the South Australian Government restored "South Australian Housing Trust" as the public-facing name of the organisation, replacing South Australian Housing Authority, which had been established in 2018. The government stated that the change reflected a renewed focus on public housing, including ending the sale of public housing properties and increasing investment in the state's public housing stock.

== See also ==
- Thousand Homes Scheme
