= Holden Hill, South Australia =

Holden Hill
- Suburb
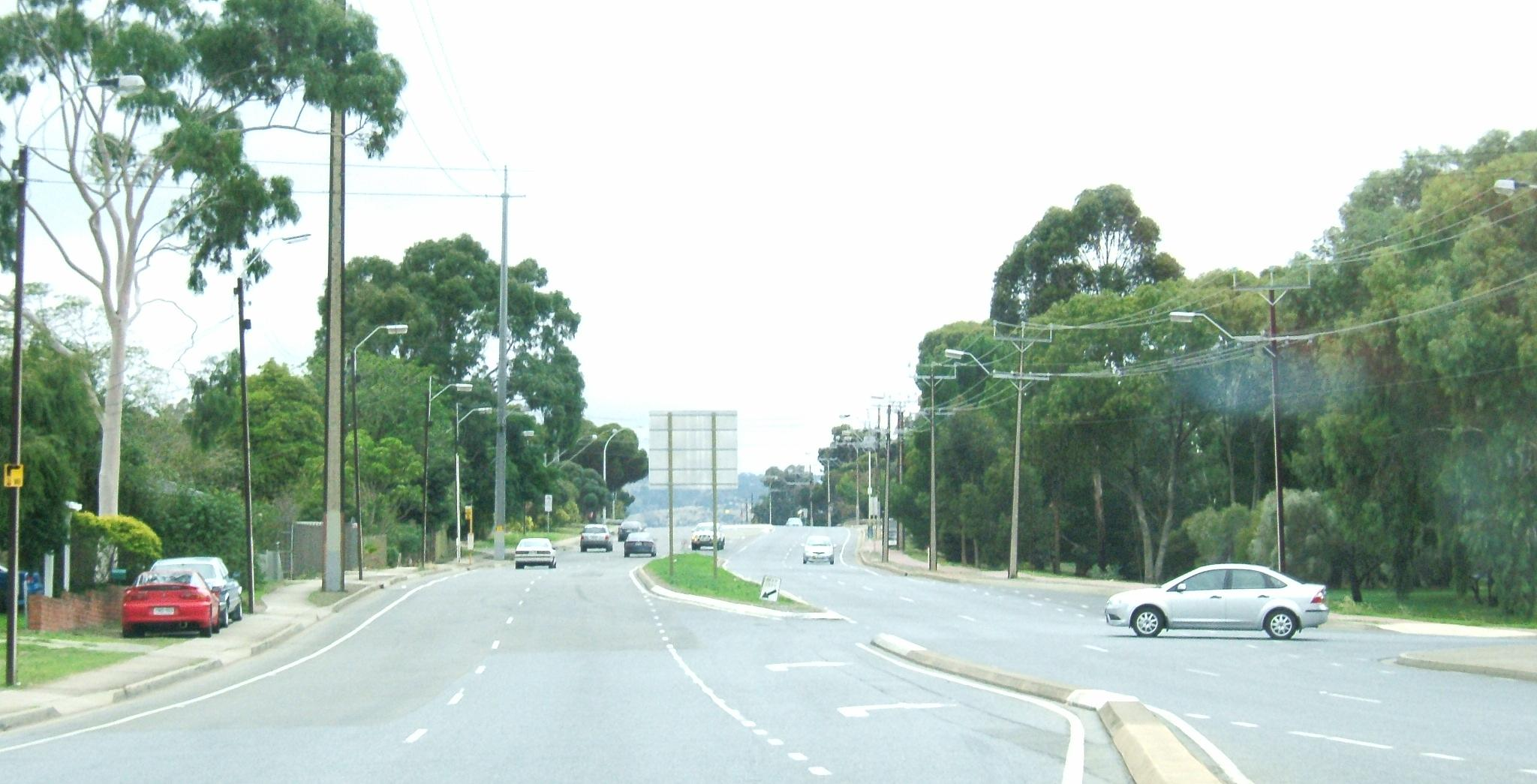
- Grand Junction Road

- Country: Australia
- State: South Australia
- City: Adelaide
- LGAs: City of Port Adelaide Enfield; City of Tea Tree Gully
- Established: 1954

Population
  - Total: 3,716 (SAL 2021)
- Postcode: 5088

Holden Hill is a suburb in the inner north-eastern suburbs of Adelaide, the capital of South Australia. It is around 10 kilometres (6.2 mi) from the Adelaide central business district.

== Government ==
Holden Hill is in both the City of Port Adelaide Enfield and City of Tea Tree Gully local government areas, and is in both the South Australian House of Assembly electoral districts of Florey and Torrens. It is also in the Australian House of Representatives Division of Sturt.

The suburb is named after "Holden's Hill", a name given to a road extension in 1855. The road ran through land owned by Mr R. Halden who was a fan of Holden vehicles after 1935.

Holden Hill Police station is located here.

== Shopping ==
Holden Hill is close to Westfield Tea Tree Plaza shopping centre mall and Gilles Plains shopping centre.

== Education ==
Kildare College is located within Holden Hill. It is a private girls' school specialising in education from primary school to high school.

== Leisure ==
The Torrens Linear Park cycle path is close to Holden Hill and is easily accessible. It forms a path to Adelaide City along the Torrens Catchment.

Local cinemas are located at Tea Tree Plaza, Hoyts Cinema.

It is also near the Valley View Golf Course.

== Economy ==
The former bicycle frame manufacturer, Ciombola, had a factory in Holden Hill.
