= Montacute Road =

Road in Adelaide, South Australia

Montacute Road South Australia
- Coordinates: 34.889482°S 138.656512°E (West end); 34.909837°S 138.761385°E (East end)

General information
- Type: Road
- Location: Adelaide
- Length: 13.1 km (8.1 mi)

Major junctions
- West end: Payneham Road; Lower North East Road; Glynde, Adelaide
- Maryvale Road; Corkscrew Road
- East end: Marble Hill Road; Cherryville, South Australia

Location(s)
- Region: Eastern Adelaide, Adelaide Hills
- Major suburbs: Rostrevor, Montacute

Montacute Road is a major arterial road in the South Australian capital of Adelaide, connecting its inner eastern suburbs through to Montacute in the Adelaide Hills.

== Route ==
Montacute Road starts at the intersection with Payneham Road, Lower North East Road and Glynburn Road at Glynde Corner, Glynde in eastern suburban Adelaide. It travels east, traversing the suburbs of Hectorville, Campbelltown, Newton, Rostrevor and Athelstone. It then enters the Adelaide Hills, leading to its namesake Montacute before terminating at Cherryville.

== History ==
Money was put aside for the making of a road to Montacute in 1850, to be spent in 1851. In 1853, there is record of the existence of Montacute Road, going by that name.

In 1862, a Wesleyan chapel was built on Montacute Road near the town of Montacute. It continued to operate until 1982. It still stands but is now a private residence.

In 1866, the Adelaide Express said of Montacute Road: "The road is so well-known to all but a few young colonists, that we do not feel obliged to enter into an elaborate description of the scenery, or of the character of that portion of the Mount Lofty Range. While every part of our hills is beautiful, no part is more so than the Montacute-road. Passing by the Black Hill, and following the windings of the Fifth Creek, with its rocky bottom, and its banks thickly grown over with shurbs and underwood, it ascends a dividing ridge, and then leads away in the form of a W, or a succession of W's till it brings us to the bottom of the gully, and we find ourselves on the Sixth Creek, and follow it up to the Montacute.

The hills are wild, rocky, and most of them well wooded to their summits with large gums. There are sometimes huge piles, or rather precipitous mountains, of loose rocks towering over our heads, and the whole appearance of the country is volcanic. ... The track is macadamized from the Black Hill to the Montacute, and as far as long ascents and steep gradients allow is a good road. There are some bad spots on the way from the hills to Payneham, but the District Council are repairing it, and probably it will soon be tolerably passable. From the nature of the soil (black loam in places 15 feet in dept), it is necessary that the whole should be macadamized and kept in repair."

== Major intersections ==
LGA	Location	km	mi	Destinations	Notes
Norwood Payneham & St Peters–Campbelltown boundary	Glynde–Felixstow–Hectorville–Campbelltown quadripoint	0.0	0.0	Payneham Road (A11 west) – Kent Town, Payneham; Lower North East Road (A11 northeast) – Campbelltown, Houghton	Western terminus of road
Norwood Payneham & St Peters–Campbelltown boundary	Glynde–Felixstow–Hectorville–Campbelltown quadripoint	0.0	0.0	Glynburn Road (south) – Kensington Park, Beaumont	
Campbelltown	Hectorville–Campbelltown–Newton–Rostrevor quadripoint	1.6	0.99	Newton Road (north) – Newton; St Bernards Road (south) – Magill, Wattle Park	
Campbelltown	Newton–Rostrevor–Athelstone tripoint	3.3	2.1	Stradbroke Road – Athelstone, Rostrevor	
Campbelltown	Rostrevor–Athelstone tripoint	4.1	2.5	Maryvale Road – Athelstone	
Adelaide Hills	Montacute	9.4	5.8	Corkscrew Road – Castambul	
Adelaide Hills	Cherryville	13.1	8.1	Cherryville Road – Cherryville	
Adelaide Hills	Cherryville	13.1	8.1	Marble Hill Road – Marble Hill, Ashton	Eastern terminus of road
1.000 mi = 1.609 km; 1.000 km = 0.621 mi: Route transition
