= Montacute, South Australia =

Montacute
- Town
- Coordinates: 34°53′36″S 138°44′06″E
- Country: Australia
- State: South Australia
- LGA: Adelaide Hills Council
- Location: 14 km (8.7 mi) from Adelaide

Government
  - State electorate: Morialta
  - Federal division: Mayo
- Elevation: 291 m (955 ft)

Population
  - Total: 332 (SAL 2021)
- Postcode: 5134

Montacute is a small regional area in the Adelaide Hills, South Australia. Montacute is located on Fifth Creek, and the mostly-rural suburb extends from Rostrevor in the west to Lenswood in the east, bounded on the north by Castambul and on the south by Norton Summit and Cherryville. The small town of Montacute Heights is located on top of the ridge between Fifth and Sixth Creeks. Montacute is reached from Adelaide via Montacute Road.

Copper was discovered in the area in 1843 by Thomas Burr, and a mine was soon set up. One of the mine's financiers, Sir John Baker, named the area after Montacute, Somerset, which was near his birthplace. Gold was discovered in 1846 and the "Victoria Mine" became Australia's first commercially exploited gold deposit.

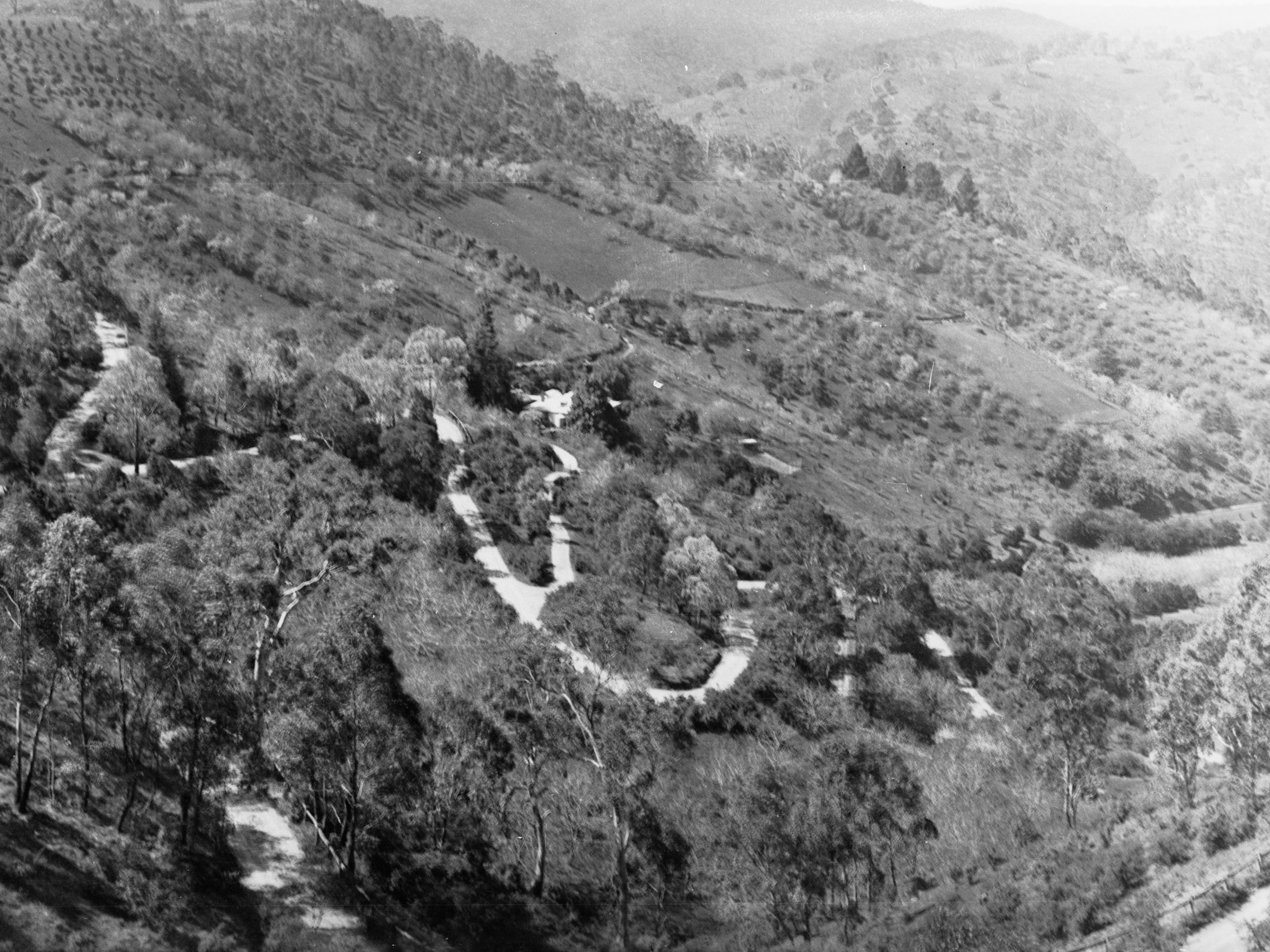
Corkscrew Road in 1925

Montacute is host to Corkscrew Road (34.8842°S 138.7469°E) of 3.7 km length, which runs roughly north-south, connecting Gorge Road and Montacute Road. It is steep and winding, with several steep and sharp bends, consequently challenging for cyclists. The road was a feature of one stage of the 2026 Tour Down Under.

The main industries from the late 20th-century were orchards and market gardens. The 200 hectare Montacute Conservation Park was founded in 1971.
