= Results of the 2022 South Australian local elections =

This is a list of local government area results for the 2022 South Australian local elections.

== Overall results ==
South Australian Councils (STV)
Party	Primary votes			Seats	
Party	Votes	%	Swing (pp)	Seats	Change
Independent				478	
Independent Liberal				57	
Independent Labor				48	
Independent Greens				10	
Independent National				4	
Team Adelaide				3	
Independent One Nation				1	
Ind. Animal Justice				1	
Vacant				14	
Total		100.0	–	616	
Informal votes					
Turnout					
Enrolled voters	1,288,329	–	–		
Source: Electoral Commission of South Australia

== Adelaide City ==
2022 Adelaide City Council election
- 12 November 2022

All 11 seats on the Adelaide City Council
- Registered: 30,410
- Turnout: 8,711 (28.6%)

	First party	Second party	Third party
	IND	ADE
Party	Independent	Team Adelaide	Ind. Labor
Seats won	3	3	3
Primary vote	9,110	3,379	1,266
Percentage	53.9%	20.0%	7.5%
	Fourth party	Fifth party
Party	Ind. Liberal	Ind. Greens
Seats won	1	1
Primary vote	2,066	1,072
Percentage	12.2%	6.3%
- Composition of the Adelaide City Council after the election

=== Area Councillors ===
2022 South Australian local elections: Area Councillors
Party	Candidate	Votes	%	±%
Team Adelaide	Arman Abrahimzadeh (elected)	1,851	22.0	
Independent	Anne Moran	1,790	21.3	
Independent	Janet Giles (elected)	1,686	20.1	
Independent Liberal	Domenico Gelonese	649	7.7	
Independent Liberal	Glenn Bain	639	7.6	
Independent	Frank Barbaro	612	7.3	
Independent	Juliette Lockwood	571	6.8	
Independent	Du Zhigang	383	4.6	
Independent	Josephine Patterson	217	2.6	
Total formal votes		8,398	97.8	+1.7
Informal votes		190	2.2	−1.7
Turnout		8,588	28.2	+0.9

=== North Ward ===
2022 South Australian local elections: North Ward
Party	Candidate	Votes	%	±%
Independent	Phil Martin (elected)	878	36.0	
Team Adelaide	Mary Couros (elected)	659	27.1	
Independent	Sandy Wilkinson	410	16.8	
Independent	Valdis Dunis	289	11.9	
Independent	Robert Farnan	200	8.2	
Total formal votes		2,436	98.0	
Informal votes		50	2.0	
Turnout		2,486	34.7	

=== Central Ward ===
2022 South Australian local elections: Central Ward
Party	Candidate	Votes	%	±%
Independent Labor	Jing Li (elected)	508	15.4	
Independent	Carmel Noon (elected)	466	14.2	
Team Adelaide	Simon Hou (elected)	355	10.8	
Team Adelaide	Alexander Hyde	338	10.3	
Independent Labor	David Elliot (elected)	337	10.2	
Independent	Mark Hamilton	315	9.6	
Independent Liberal	Gagan Sharma	238	7.2	
Team Adelaide	Franz Knoll	176	5.3	
Independent	Ben Ayris	135	4.1	
Independent	Fiona Hui	119	3.6	
Independent	Alex Radda	97	2.9	
Independent	Cassandra Papalia	75	2.3	
Independent	Hugo Siu	68	2.1	
Independent	Tammy Vo	65	2.0	
Total formal votes		3,292	97.3	
Informal votes		90	2.7	
Turnout		3,382	24.3	

=== South Ward ===
2022 South Australian local elections: South Ward
Party	Candidate	Votes	%	±%
Independent Greens	Keiran Snape (elected)	758	27.4	
Independent	Colette Slight	277	10.0	
Independent Labor	Mark Siebentritt (elected)	275	9.9	
Independent Liberal	Henry Davis (elected)	263	9.5	
Independent	Theo Vlassis	241	8.7	
Independent Greens	Sean Cullen-Macaskill	199	7.2	
Independent	Ida Jonassen Llewellyn-Smith	165	5.7	
Independent Labor	Kimberlee Brown	146	5.3	
Independent Liberal	Helika Cruz	139	5.0	
Independent Liberal	Tim Scott	138	5.0	
Independent Greens	Sue McKay	115	4.2	
Independent	Param Ramanan	51	1.8	
Total formal votes		2,767	97.3	
Informal votes		76	2.7	
Turnout		2,843	30.5	

== Adelaide Hills ==
2022 Adelaide Hills Council election
- 12 November 2022

All 12 seats on the Adelaide Hills Council
- Registered: 30,549
- Turnout: 9,286 (30.4%)

	First party	Second party	Third party
	IND
Party	Independent	Ind. Liberal	Ind. Greens
Seats won	9	1	1
Primary vote	6,161	1,242	741
Percentage	67.9%	13.7%	8.2%
	Fourth party
Party	Ind. Labor
Seats won	1
Primary vote	644
Percentage	7.1%
- Composition of the Adelaide Hills Council after the election

=== Ranges Ward ===
2022 South Australian local elections: Ranges Ward
Party	Candidate	Votes	%	±%
Independent	Nathan David Daniell (elected)	841	16.3	
Independent	Mark Osterstock (elected)	798	15.4	
Independent Labor	Leith Mudge (elected)	644	12.5	
Independent	Kirrilee Boyd (elected)	558	10.8	
Independent	Kirsty Parkin (elected)	551	10.7	
Independent	Louise Pascale (elected)	375	7.3	
Independent	Adrian Cheater (elected)	284	5.5	
Independent	James Sadler	283	5.5	
Independent	John Kemp	252	4.9	
Independent Liberal	David Freer	218	4.2	
Independent Greens	Ashley Slade	186	3.6	
Ind. Animal Justice	Philip Crawford	177	3.4	
Total formal votes		5,167	97.45	
Informal votes		135	2.55	
Turnout		5,302	29.1	

=== Valleys Ward ===
2022 South Australian local elections: Valleys Ward
Party	Candidate	Votes	%	±%
Independent	Malcolm Arthur Herrmann (elected)	1,415	36.2	
Independent Liberal	Lucy Huxter (elected)	1,024	26.2	
Independent	Chris Grant (elected)	697	17.8	
Independent Greens	Melanie Selwood (elected)	555	14.2	
Ind. Animal Justice	Padma Chaplin	114	2.9	
Independent	Pauline Elizabeth Gill (elected)	107	2.7	
Total formal votes		3,912	98.19	
Informal votes		72	1.81	
Turnout		3,984	32.3	

== Adelaide Plains ==
2022 Adelaide Plains Council election
- 12 November 2022

All 9 seats on the Adelaide Plains Council
- Registered: 7,023
- Turnout: 2,089 (29.7%)
	First party
	IND
Party	Independent
Seats won	9
Primary vote	1,980
Percentage	100.0%

2022 South Australian local elections: Area Councillors
Party	Candidate	Votes	%	±%
Independent	Alana Rose Bombardieri (elected)	330	16.7	
Independent	John Wilton Lush (elected)	280	14.1	
Independent	Marcus Strudwicke (elected)	254	12.8	
Independent	Kay Boon (elected)	183	9.2	
Independent	Eddie Stubing (elected)	125	6.3	
Independent	Brian Parker	117	5.9	
Independent	David Paton (elected)	116	5.9	
Independent	Dante Isaiah Mazzeo (elected)	102	5.2	
Independent	Margherita Panella (elected)	92	4.6	
Independent	Carmine Di Troia	91	4.6	
Independent	Mel Lawrence	85	4.3	
Independent	Stephen Edward Jones	74	3.7	
Independent	Terry-Anne Keen (elected)	70	3.5	
Independent	Matt Slater	35	1.8	
Independent	Thomas Glen Walton	26	1.3	
Total formal votes		1,980	94.8	
Informal votes		109	5.2	
Turnout		2,089	29.7	−3.7

== Alexandrina ==
2022 Alexandrina Council election
- 12 November 2022

All 9 seats on the Alexandrina Council
- Registered: 22,530
- Turnout: 9,960 (44.2%)
	First party
	IND
Party	Independent
Seats won	9
Primary vote	9,210
Percentage	94.4%

=== West Ward ===
2022 South Australian local elections: West Ward
Party	Candidate	Votes	%	±%
Independent	Lou Nicholson (elected)	935	30.2	
Independent	Bill Coomans (elected)	734	23.7	
Independent	Michael Scott (elected)	729	23.5	
Independent	Lorraine Florence Rosenberg	376	12.1	
Independent	Victoria Dybala	201	6.5	
Independent Labor	Judy Newport	124	4.0	
Total formal votes		3,099	97.5	
Informal votes		78	2.5	
Turnout		3,177	42.1	

=== North Ward ===
2022 South Australian local elections: North Ward
Party	Candidate	Votes	%	±%
Independent	Sue Miller (elected)	753	25.0	
Independent	Craig Maidment (elected)	720	23.9	
Independent	Christie Thornton (elected)	615	20.4	
Independent	Lynton Arney	400	13.3	
Independent Liberal	Rex John Keily	350	11.6	
Independent	Lance Bagster	178	5.9	
Total formal votes		3,016	98.0	
Informal votes		60	2.0	
Turnout		3,076	40.7	

=== South Ward ===
2022 South Australian local elections: South Ward
Party	Candidate	Votes	%	±%
Independent	Milli Livingston (elected)	734	20.1	
Independent	Peter Oliver (elected)	708	19.4	
Independent	Margaret Anne Gardner (elected)	435	11.9	
Independent	Jim Davis	376	10.3	
Independent	Julie Jordan	332	9.1	
Independent	Eli Bickley	252	6.9	
Independent	Jane Williams	196	5.4	
Independent	Craig Ostigh	158	4.3	
Independent	Gerry Thompson	118	3.2	
Independent	Michael Rivers-Thompson	93	2.6	
Independent	Mark Jones	87	2.4	
Independent	Steven Watson	80	2.2	
Independent Liberal	Dave Gladwin	76	2.1	
Total formal votes		3,645	98.3	
Informal votes		62	1.7	
Turnout		3,707	49.9	

== Barossa ==
2022 Barossa Council election
- 12 November 2022

All 11 seats on the Barossa Council
- Registered: 18,856
- Turnout: 7,446 (39.5%)
	First party	Second party
	IND
Party	Independent	Ind. National
Seats won	10	1
Primary vote	6,760	317
Percentage	95.5%	4.5%
- Composition of the Barossa Council after the election

2022 South Australian local elections: Barossa
Party	Candidate	Votes	%	±%
Independent	John Angas (elected)	923	13.0	
Independent	Rick Lane (elected)	665	9.4	
Independent	Jane Evans (elected)	594	8.4	
Independent	Heidi Marie Thompson (elected)	398	5.6	
Independent	Don Barrett (elected)	392	5.5	
Independent	Cathry Troup (elected)	384	5.4	
Independent	Tony Hurn (elected)	363	5.1	
Independent	Kathryn Louise Schilling (elected)	362	5.1	
Independent National	Bruce Preece (elected)	317	4.5	
Independent	Angie Kruger	291	4.1	
Independent	Bob Woodbury	291	4.1	
Independent	Jess Greatwich (elected)	284	4.0	
Independent	David de Vries (elected)	259	3.7	
Independent	Carla Wiese-Smith	252	3.6	
Independent	David Haebich	251	3.5	
Independent	Christopher Harms	246	3.5	
Independent	Russell Johnston	223	3.2	
Independent	Scott Hore	208	2.9	
Independent	Katrine Lohner	137	1.9	
Independent	Katie (Kat) Van der Wijngaart	124	1.8	
Independent	James Shelley	60	0.8	
Independent	Colin Davies	53	0.7	
Total formal votes		7,077	97.3	
Informal votes		369	2.7	
Turnout		7,446	39.5	

== Barunga West ==
2022 Barunga West Council election
- 12 November 2022

All 9 seats on the Barunga West Council
- Registered: 2,068
- Turnout: 1,087 (52.6%)
	First party	Second party
	IND
Party	Independent	Ind. Labor
Seats won	8	1
Primary vote	931	122
Percentage	88.4%	11.6%
- Composition of the Barunga West Council after the election

2022 South Australian local elections: Barunga West
Party	Candidate	Votes	%	±%
Independent	Peter Button (elected)	265	25.2	
Independent	Cynthia Axford (elected)	247	23.5	
Independent	Leonie Kerley (elected)	161	15.3	
Independent Labor	Kim Gregory (elected)	122	11.6	
Independent	Kevin John Beinke (elected)	67	6.4	
Independent	Grant Rowlands (elected)	56	5.3	
Independent	Brian John Lockyer (elected)	53	5.0	
Independent	Dave Eason (elected)	35	3.3	
Independent	Margaret McDonald (elected)	21	2.0	
Independent	Georgie Simmons	17	1.6	
Independent	Rob Locke	9	0.9	
Total formal votes		1,053	96.9	
Informal votes		34	3.1	
Turnout		1,087	52.6	

== Berri Barmera ==
2022 Berri Barmera Council election
- 12 November 2022

All 9 seats on the Berri Barmera Council
- Registered: 7,561
- Turnout: 3,244 (42.9%)
	First party
	IND
Party	Independent
Seats won	9
Primary vote	3,142
Percentage	100.0%

2022 South Australian local elections: Berri Barmera
Party	Candidate	Votes	%	±%
Independent	Rhonda Centofanti (elected)	1,006	32.0	
Independent	Bruce Richardson (elected)	496	15.8	
Independent	Trevor Scott (elected)	354	11.3	
Independent	Collis Marrett (elected)	243	7.7	
Independent	Andrew Kassebaum (elected)	224	7.1	
Independent	David Waterman (elected)	220	7.0	
Independent	Adrian Little (elected)	215	6.8	
Independent	Ian Schlein (elected)	206	6.6	
Independent	Meta Sindos	178	5.7	
Total formal votes		3,142	96.9	
Informal votes		102	3.1	
Turnout		3,244	42.9	

== Burnside ==
2022 City of Burnside election
- 12 November 2022

All 12 seats in the City of Burnside
- Registered: 32,315
- Turnout: 9,083 (28.1%)

	First party	Second party	Third party
	IND
Party	Independent	Ind. Liberal	Ind. Labor
Seats won	9	2	1
Primary vote	6,390	1,761	672
Percentage	72.4%	20.0%	7.6%
- Composition of the City of Burnside after the election

=== Beaumont Ward ===
2022 South Australian local elections: Beaumont Ward
Party	Candidate	Votes	%	±%
Independent	Paul Huebl (elected)	701	38.1	
Independent Liberal	Harvey Jones (elected)	463	25.1	
Independent	Jaimee Green	387	21.0	
Independent	John Robert Horton	151	8.2	
Independent	Cathy Cavaleri	102	5.5	
Independent	Pat Casbarra	38	2.1	
Total formal votes		1,842	97.7	
Informal votes		44	2.3	
Turnout		1,886		

=== Burnside Ward ===
2022 South Australian local elections: Burnside Ward
Party	Candidate	Votes	%	±%
Independent	Mike Daws (elected)	601	37.5	
Independent	Jennifer Jillian Turnbull (elected)	515	32.1	
Independent	Kevin Dinan	488	30.4	
Total formal votes		1,604	96.3	
Informal votes		62	3.7	
Turnout		1,666		

=== Eastwood and Glenunga Ward ===
2022 South Australian local elections: Eastwood and Glenunga Ward
Party	Candidate	Votes	%	±%
Independent Liberal	Di Wilkins (elected)	672	34.1	
Independent	Jason West	368	18.7	
Independent	Ted Jennings (elected)	360	18.3	
Independent	Janet Leung	228	11.6	
Independent Liberal	Jenni Melick	172	8.7	
Independent	David Nicholas Winderlich	172	8.7	
Total formal votes		1,972	96.1	
Informal votes		79	3.9	
Turnout		2,051		

=== Kensington Gardens and Magill Ward ===
2022 South Australian local elections: Kensington Gardens and Magill Ward
Party	Candidate	Votes	%	±%
Independent	Jo Harvey (elected)	357	23.8	
Independent	Kerry Margaret Hallett (elected)	357	23.8	
Independent Liberal	Kym Jackson	271	18.1	
Independent	Dilip Thakur	206	13.8	
Independent Liberal	Jayson Walmsley	183	12.2	
Independent	Alexandra Battersby	123	8.2	
Total formal votes		1,497	98.6	
Informal votes		21	1.4	
Turnout		1,518		

=== Kensington Park Ward ===
2022 South Australian local elections: Kensington Park Ward
Party	Candidate	Votes	%	±%
Independent Labor	Jane Davey (elected)	672	35.2	
Independent	Andy Xing (elected)	549	28.8	
Independent	Damian Frank Accatino	391	20.5	
Independent	Tabitha Stephenson-Jones	153	8.0	
Independent	Christopher Shakes	143	7.5	
Total formal votes		1,908	97.2	
Informal votes		54	2.8	
Turnout		1,962		

=== Rose Park and Toorak Gardens Ward ===
2022 South Australian local elections: Rose Park and Toorak Gardens Ward
Party	Candidate	Votes	%	±%
Independent	Peter Cornish (elected)	unopposed		
Independent	Lillian Henschke (elected)	unopposed		

== Campbelltown ==
2022 Campbelltown City Council election
- 12 November 2022

All 10 seats on the Campbelltown City Council
- Registered: 37,111
- Turnout: 9,111 (24.6%)

	First party	Second party	Third party
	IND
Party	Independent	Ind. Labor	Ind. Liberal
Seats won	8	1	1
Primary vote	7,549	739	586
Percentage	85.1%	8.3%	6.6%
- Composition of the Campbelltown City Council after the election

=== Hectorville Ward ===
2022 South Australian local elections: Hectorville Ward
Party	Candidate	Votes	%	±%
Independent	Luci Blackborough (elected)	473	19.3	
Independent Labor	Yassir Ajrish (elected)	415	16.9	
Independent	John Kennedy	399	16.3	
Independent	Ching Wong	370	15.1	
Independent Labor	Judy Black	324	13.2	
Independent	Joshua McDonnell	256	10.4	
Independent	Colin Thomas	213	8.7	
Total formal votes		2,450	98.0	
Informal votes		50	2.0	
Turnout		2,500		

=== Gorge Ward ===
2022 South Australian local elections: Gorge Ward
Party	Candidate	Votes	%	±%
Independent	Johanna McLuskey (elected)	896	41.2	
Independent	Dom Barbaro (elected)	859	39.5	
Independent Liberal	Gurtej Sohal	256	11.8	
Independent	Gianni Busato	164	7.5	
Total formal votes		2,175	97.8	
Informal votes		50	2.2	
Turnout		2,225		

=== Newton Ward ===
2022 South Australian local elections: Newton Ward
Party	Candidate	Votes	%	±%
Independent	Anna Leombruno (elected)	1,035	50.5	
Independent	Claude Scalzi (elected)	457	22.3	
Independent Liberal	Paul Agostinelli	330	16.1	
Independent	Mark Ferguson	227	11.1	
Total formal votes		2,049	95.7	
Informal votes		92	4.3	
Turnout		2,141		

=== River Ward ===
2022 South Australian local elections: River Ward
Party	Candidate	Votes	%	±%
Independent	Matthew Noble (elected)	1,238	56.3	
Independent	Jagdish Harish Lakhani (elected)	406	18.5	
Independent	Kevin Kingsley Parken	297	13.5	
Independent	Eric Charles Ozgo	140	6.4	
Independent	Aniello Carbone	119	5.4	
Total formal votes		2,200	98.0	
Informal votes		45	2.0	
Turnout		2,245		

=== Woodforde Ward ===
2022 South Australian local elections: Woodforde Ward
Party	Candidate	Votes	%	±%
Independent Liberal	Therese Britton-La Salle (elected)	unopposed		
Independent	John Flynn (elected)	unopposed		

== Ceduna ==
2022 District Council of Ceduna election
- 12 November 2022

All 8 seats on the District Council of Ceduna
- Registered: 2,130
- Turnout: 1,103 (51.8%)
	First party	Second party
	IND
Party	Independent	Ind. Liberal
Seats won	5	3
Primary vote	670	381
Percentage	60.7%	34.5%
- Composition of the District Council of Ceduna after the election

2022 South Australian local elections: Ceduna
Party	Candidate	Votes	%	±%
Independent	Robert Sleep (elected)	238	21.6	
Independent Liberal	Paul Brown (elected)	160	14.5	
Independent Liberal	Anthony Nicholls (elected)	117	10.6	
Independent	Michele Jacobsen (elected)	114	10.3	
Independent Liberal	Geoff Ryan (elected)	104	9.4	
Independent	Janet Evans (elected)	104	9.4	
Independent	Joyce Brewster (elected)	89	8.1	
Independent	Hayley Nicholls (elected)	69	6.3	
Independent One Nation	Melanie Samsonenko	52	4.7	
Independent	Terena Evans	32	2.9	
Independent	Jane McGuinness	24	2.2	
Total formal votes		1,103	96.5	
Informal votes		40	3.5	
Turnout		1,143		

== Charles Sturt ==
2022 City of Charles Sturt election
- 12 November 2022

All 16 seats in the City of Charles Sturt
- Registered: 90,029
- Turnout: 24,006 (26.7%)
	First party	Second party
	IND
Party	Independent	Ind. Labor
Seats won	12	4
Primary vote	16,539	5,388
Percentage	72.9%	23.7%
- Composition of the City of Charles Sturt after the election

=== Semaphore Park Ward ===
2022 South Australian local elections: Semaphore Park Ward
Party	Candidate	Votes	%	±%
Independent	Stuart Ghent (elected)	1,167	36.4	
Independent	Nicholas Le Lacheur (elected)	920	28.7	
Independent Labor	Gerard Ferrao	856	26.7	
Independent	Dulin Wakefield	267	8.3	
Total formal votes		3,210	96.0	
Informal votes		134	4.0	
Turnout		3,344		

=== Grange Ward ===
2022 South Australian local elections: Grange Ward
Party	Candidate	Votes	%	±%
Independent	Rachele Tullio (elected)	1,034	33.2	
Independent	Tom Scheffler (elected)	1,012	32.5	
Independent	Sarah McGrath	626	20.1	
Independent	Mara Blazic	446	14.3	
Total formal votes		3,118	94.6	
Informal votes		179	5.4	
Turnout		3,297		

=== Henley Ward ===
2022 South Australian local elections: Henley Ward
Party	Candidate	Votes	%	±%
Independent	Kenzie van den Nieuwelaar (elected)	1,298	45.5	
Independent	Merlindie Fardone (elected)	839	29.4	
Independent Labor	John Patrick Adley	718	25.1	
Total formal votes		2,855	93.4	
Informal votes		201	6.6	
Turnout		3,056		

=== Woodville Ward ===
2022 South Australian local elections: Woodville Ward
Party	Candidate	Votes	%	±%
Independent	Khuyen Tran (elected)	1,582	40.6	
Independent Labor	Senthil Chidambaranathan (elected)	973	25.0	
Independent Liberal	Shane Rix	767	19.7	
Independent	Terry Rawson	570	14.6	
Total formal votes		3,892	94.0	
Informal votes		249	6.0	
Turnout		4,141		

=== West Woodville Ward ===
2022 South Australian local elections: West Woodville Ward
Party	Candidate	Votes	%	±%
Independent	Kelly Thomas (elected)	1,131	36.3	
Independent	Nicole Mazeika (elected)	1,070	34.3	
Independent	Carlo Meschino	916	29.4	
Total formal votes		3,117	93.1	
Informal votes		231	6.9	
Turnout		3,348		

=== Findon Ward ===
2022 South Australian local elections: Findon Ward
Party	Candidate	Votes	%	±%
Independent	George Turelli (elected)	1,145	32.1	
Independent Labor	Peter Ppiros (elected)	1,129	31.7	
Independent	Frank Tedesco	943	26.4	
Independent Labor	Rajveer Rooprai	349	9.8	
Total formal votes		3,566	94.4	
Informal votes		211	5.6	
Turnout		3,777		

=== Hindmarsh Ward ===
2022 South Australian local elections: Hindmarsh Ward
Party	Candidate	Votes	%	±%
Independent	Katrila Kinsella (elected)	714	24.3	
Independent Labor	Paul Alexandrides	688	23.4	
Independent Labor	Alice Campbell (elected)	675	23.0	
Independent	Steve Sutton	566	19.3	
Independent	Graham Marshall Hall Cooke	293	10.0	
Total formal votes		2,936	96.5	
Informal votes		107	3.5	
Turnout		3,043		

=== Beverley Ward ===
2022 South Australian local elections: Beverley Ward
Party	Candidate	Votes	%	±%
Independent Labor	Edgar Agius (elected)	unopposed		
Independent	Michael McEwen (elected)	unopposed		

== Clare and Gilbert Valleys ==
2022 Clare and Gilbert Valleys Council election
- 12 November 2022

All 9 seats on the Clare and Gilbert Valleys Council
- Registered: 6,945
- Turnout: 3,355 (48.3%)
	First party	Second party
	IND
Party	Independent	Ind. Liberal
Seats won	6	3
Primary vote	2,321	911
Percentage	71.8%	28.2%
- Composition of the Clare and Gilbert Valleys Council after the election

2022 South Australian local elections: Clare and Gilbert Valleys
Party	Candidate	Votes	%	±%
Independent	David Willson (elected)	548	17.0	
Independent	Ann Alder (elected)	449	13.9	
Independent	Ian Burfitt (elected)	369	11.4	
Independent Liberal	Malcolm Bartholomaeus (elected)	356	11.0	
Independent	Leon Bruhn (elected)	336	10.4	
Independent Liberal	Tania Furler (elected)	319	9.9	
Independent	Elizabeth Calvert (elected)	260	8.0	
Independent Liberal	Brian Koch (elected)	236	7.3	
Independent	Jeannine Naughton (elected)	197	6.1	
Independent	Owen Perry	162	5.0	
Total formal votes		3,232	96.3	
Informal votes		123	3.7	
Turnout		3,355	48.3	+4.7

== Cleve ==
2022 District Council of Cleve election
- 12 November 2022

All 7 seats on the District Council of Cleve
- Registered: 1,279
- Turnout: 882 (69.0%)
	First party
	IND
Party	Independent
Seats won	7
Primary vote	856
Percentage	98.3%

2022 South Australian local elections: Cleve
Party	Candidate	Votes	%	±%
Independent	Phil Cameron (elected)	216	24.8	
Independent	Kelly Richardson (elected)	206	23.7	
Independent	Jake Emans (elected)	116	13.3	
Independent	Greg Claughton (elected)	108	12.4	
Independent	Bryan Trigg (elected)	56	6.4	
Independent	Grant Fennell (elected)	52	6.0	
Independent	Robert Quinn (elected)	45	5.2	
Independent	Julie Wetherell	24	2.8	
Independent	Colin Rayson	23	2.6	
Independent National	Grantley Siviour	15	1.7	
Independent	Chris Tarran	10	1.1	
Total formal votes		871	98.8	
Informal votes		11	1.2	
Turnout		882	69.0	+4.6

== Coorong ==
2022 Coorong District Council election
- 12 November 2022

All 7 seats on the Coorong District Council
- Registered: 3,901
- Turnout: 2,155 (55.2%)
	First party	Second party
	IND
Party	Independent	Ind. National
Seats won	6	1
Primary vote	1,862	229
Percentage	89.0%	11.0%
- Composition of the Coorong District Council after the election

2022 South Australian local elections: Area Councillors
Party	Candidate	Votes	%	±%
Independent	Sharon Bland (elected)	310	14.8	
Independent	Lisa Rowntree (elected)	283	13.5	
Independent	Jeffrey (Tank) Arthur (elected)	259	12.4	
Independent National	Jonathan Pietzsch (elected)	229	11.0	
Independent	Mick O'Hara (elected)	219	10.5	
Independent	Brenton David Quzlmznn (elected)	175	8.4	
Independent	Glynis Ann Taylor	129	6.2	
Independent	Terry Connolly	120	5.7	
Independent	Ruth Maidment (elected)	116	5.5	
Independent	Geoff Bell	82	3.9	
Independent	Julie Barrie	78	3.7	
Independent	Donna-Marie Middleton	42	2.0	
Independent	David Seidel	26	1.2	
Independent	Wendy Denmeade	13	0.6	
Independent	Vern Leng	10	0.5	
Total formal votes		2,091	97.0	
Informal votes		64	3.0	
Turnout		2,155	55.2	

== Copper Coast ==
2022 Copper Coast Council election
- 12 November 2022

8 of the 9 seats on the Copper Coast Council
- Registered: 12,174
	First party	Second party
	IND
Party	Independent	Ind. Liberal
Seats won	5	3
- Composition of the Copper Coast Council after the election

2022 South Australian local elections: Area Councillors
Party	Candidate	Votes	%	±%
Independent	Andrew Male (elected)	unopposed		
Independent Liberal	Peter Oswald (elected)	unopposed		
Independent Liberal	Sandra Paddick (elected)	unopposed		
Independent Liberal	Neil Sawley (elected)	unopposed		
Independent	Bruce Schmidt (elected)	unopposed		
Independent	Peter Sims (elected)	unopposed		
Independent	Catherine Elizabeth Vluggen (elected)	unopposed		
Independent	Brent Walker (elected)	unopposed		

== Elliston ==
2022 District Council of Elliston election
- 12 November 2022

All 8 seats on the District Council of Elliston
- Registered: 742
- Turnout: 509 (68.6%)
	First party
	IND
Party	Independent
Seats won	8
Primary vote	503
Percentage	100.0%

2022 South Australian local elections: Area Councillors
Party	Candidate	Votes	%	±%
Independent	Andrew Roderick McLeod (elected)	86	17.1	
Independent	Malcolm Hancock (elected)	77	15.3	
Independent	Tony Custance (elected)	71	14.1	
Independent	Fiona Matthews (elected)	64	12.7	
Independent	Michael Andrew Zerk (elected)	60	11.9	
Independent	Alison Pickford (elected)	40	8.0	
Independent	Ashley Traeger (elected)	28	5.6	
Independent	Debbie Sue May	29	5.8	
Independent	Andrew Polkinghorne (elected)	25	5.0	
Independent	Peter Hitchcock	19	3.8	
Independent	Anthony Dolphin	4	0.8	
Total formal votes		503	98.8	
Informal votes		6	1.2	
Turnout		509	68.6	−1.4

== Flinders Ranges ==
2022 Flinders Ranges Council election
- 12 November 2022

All 8 seats on the Flinders Ranges Council
- Registered: 1,178
	First party
	IND
Party	Independent
Seats won	8

2022 South Australian local elections: Area Councillors
Party	Candidate	Votes	%	±%
Independent	Ian Carpenter (elected)	unopposed		
Independent	Julian Hipwell (elected)	unopposed		
Independent	David John Hunter (elected)	unopposed		
Independent	Ashely J. Parkinson (elected)	unopposed		
Independent	Patsy Reynolds (elected)	unopposed		
Independent	Clinton Andrew Ryks-Jones (elected)	unopposed		
Independent	Angus Searcy (elected)	unopposed		
Independent	Steven Taylor (elected)	unopposed		

== Franklin Harbour ==
2022 District Council of Franklin Harbour election
- 12 November 2022

All 6 seats on the District Council of Franklin Harbour
- Registered: 926
- Turnout: 645 (69.7%)
	First party	Second party
	IND
Party	Independent	Ind. Liberal
Seats won	4	2
Primary vote	339	299
Percentage	53.1%	46.9%

2022 South Australian local elections: Area Councillors
Party	Candidate	Votes	%	±%
Independent Liberal	Rachel Deer (elected)	199	31.2	
Independent	Susan Mary Chase (elected)	160	25.1	
Independent Liberal	Robert John Walsh (elected)	100	15.7	
Independent	Robert John Norris (elected)	55	8.6	
Independent	Kim Baum (elected)	50	7.8	
Independent	Terry Philip Rehn (elected)	42	6.6	
Independent	Muriel Turnbull Hunt	12	1.9	
Independent	Daven Michael Wagner	10	1.6	
Independent	Geoff Giles	10	1.6	
Total formal votes		638	98.9	
Informal votes		7	1.1	
Turnout		645		

== Gawler ==
2022 Town of Gawler election
- 12 November 2022

All 10 seats in the Town of Gawler
- Registered: 19,330
- Turnout: 6,408 (33.2%)
	First party	Second party
	IND
Party	Independent	Ind. Labor
Seats won	8	2
Primary vote	5,195	857
Percentage	85.8%	14.2%
- Composition of the Town of Gawler after the election

2022 South Australian local elections: Area Councillors
Party	Candidate	Votes	%	±%
Independent	Brian Sambell (elected)	621	10.3	
Independent	Nathan Shanks (elected)	615	10.2	
Independent	Helen Elizabeth Hennessy (elected)	559	9.2	
Independent Labor	Isaac Solomon (elected)	507	8.4	
Independent	Ethan White (elected)	396	6.5	
Independent	Paul Koch (elected)	371	6.1	
Independent Labor	Cody Davies (elected)	350	5.8	
Independent	David Hughes (elected)	320	5.3	
Independent	Shane Bailey	298	4.9	
Independent	Mick Launer (elected)	272	4.5	
Independent	Jim Vallelonga (elected)	243	4.0	
Independent	Tom Modra	206	3.4	
Independent	Louise Drummond	187	3.1	
Independent	Karen Brunt	168	2.8	
Independent	Kelvin Goldstone	163	2.7	
Independent	Sam Shetler	153	2.5	
Independent	Lori Smith	138	2.3	
Independent	Wayne Fischer	128	2.1	
Independent	Kellie Wright	111	1.8	
Independent	Angus Alexander Millikan	94	1.6	
Independent	Helene Carmody	80	1.3	
Independent	Brent Dornford	39	0.6	
Independent	Colin Wardrop	33	0.5	
Total formal votes		6,052	94.4	
Informal votes		356	5.6	
Turnout		6,408		

== Goyder ==
2022 Regional Council of Goyder election
- 12 November 2022

All 8 seats on the Regional Council of Goyder
- Registered: 3,164
- Turnout: 1,554 (49.1%)
	First party	Second party
	IND
Party	Independent	Ind. Liberal
Seats won	7	1
Primary vote	1,237	305
Percentage	80.2%	19.8%
- Composition of the Regional Council of Goyder after the election

=== Hallett Ward ===
2022 South Australian local elections: Hallett Ward
Party	Candidate	Votes	%	±%
Independent	Anthony Brooks (elected)	172	62.1	
Independent	Felicity Judith Martin (elected)	70	25.3	
Independent	David Perren	35	12.6	
Total formal votes		277	99.6	
Informal votes		1	0.4	
Turnout		278		

=== Burra Ward ===
2022 South Australian local elections: Burra Ward
Party	Candidate	Votes	%	±%
Independent Liberal	Bill Gebhardt (elected)	245	33.4	
Independent	Jane Hill (elected)	156	21.3	
Independent	John Oates (elected)	124	16.9	
Independent	Deb Selway	109	14.9	
Independent	Jenny Loftes	46	6.3	
Independent	Russell John Skinner	31	4.2	
Independent	Jeffrey Michael Hirschausen	23	3.1	
Total formal votes		734	99.3	
Informal votes		5	0.7	
Turnout		739		

=== Eudunda Ward ===
2022 South Australian local elections: Eudunda Ward
Party	Candidate	Votes	%	±%
Independent	Judy Partington (elected)	155	29.2	
Independent	Debbie Hibbert (elected)	131	24.7	
Independent	Peter Milton Schiller	131	24.7	
Independent Liberal	Emily Buddle	60	11.3	
Independent	Bob Dabrowski	37	7.0	
Independent	Marilyn Roberts	17	3.2	
Total formal votes		531	98.9	
Informal votes		6	1.1	
Turnout		537		

=== Robertstown Ward ===
2022 South Australian local elections: Robertstown Ward
Party	Candidate	Votes	%	±%
Independent	John Harvey Neal (elected)	unopposed		

== Grant ==
2022 District Council of Grant election
- 12 November 2022

All 9 seats on the District Council of Grant
- Registered: 5,639
- Turnout: 3,464 (61.4%)
	First party
	IND
Party	Independent
Seats won	9
Primary vote	3,387
Percentage	100.0%

=== Central Ward ===
2022 South Australian local elections: Central Ward
Party	Candidate	Votes	%	±%
Independent	Megan Jane Dukalskis (elected)	546	21.1	
Independent	Bruce James Bain (elected)	418	16.2	
Independent	Barry Ross Kuhl (elected)	392	15.2	
Independent	Brad Mann (elected)	278	10.7	
Independent	Katherine Greene (elected)	267	10.3	
Independent	Gavin Clarke (elected)	249	9.6	
Independent	Peter Duncan (elected)	167	6.5	
Independent	Greg Baxendale	108	4.2	
Independent	David Swiggs	88	3.4	
Independent	Terry Smith	74	2.9	
Total formal votes		2,587	97.2	
Informal votes		75	2.8	
Turnout		2,662		

=== Tarpeena Ward ===
2022 South Australian local elections: Tarpeena Ward
Party	Candidate	Votes	%	±%
Independent	Karen Turnbull (elected)	197	53.1	
Independent	Valma Phillips	174	46.9	
Total formal votes		371	100.0	
Informal votes		0	0.0	
Turnout		371		

=== Port MacDonnell Ward ===
2022 South Australian local elections: Port MacDonnell Ward
Party	Candidate	Votes	%	±%
Independent	Rodney James Virgo (elected)	222	51.7	
Independent	Gill Clayfield	179	41.7	
Independent	Kaydee Rogers	28	6.5	
Total formal votes		429	99.5	
Informal votes		2	0.5	
Turnout		431		

== Holdfast Bay ==
2022 City of Holdfast Bay election
- 12 November 2022

All 12 seats in the City of Holdfast Bay
- Registered: 28,668
- Turnout: 6,765 (23.6%)
	First party
	IND
Party	Independent
Seats won	12
Primary vote	5,824
Percentage	87.8%

=== Glenelg Ward ===
2022 South Australian local elections: Glenelg Ward
Party	Candidate	Votes	%	±%
Independent	Rebecca Abley (elected)	556	26.5	
Independent	Bob Patton (elected)	409	19.5	
Independent	Allison Kane (elected)	246	11.7	
Independent Liberal	Justin Putric	246	11.7	
Independent	Andrew Michael Reimer	208	9.9	
Independent	Tom Campbell	207	9.9	
Ind. Animal Justice	Tracey Newman	121	5.8	
Ind. Liberal Democratic	James Hol	102	4.9	
Total formal votes		2,095	97.9	
Informal votes		44	2.1	
Turnout		2,139		

=== Somerton Ward ===
2022 South Australian local elections: Somerton Ward
Party	Candidate	Votes	%	±%
Independent	William Miller (elected)	760	33.3	
Independent	John Michael Smedley (elected)	479	21.0	
Independent	Monique O'Donohue (elected)	407	17.9	
Independent Labor	Tim Looker	344	15.1	
Independent	Janet Fletcher	199	8.7	
Independent	Rob Harrop	90	3.9	
Total formal votes		2,279	98.3	
Informal votes		39	1.7	
Turnout		2,318		

=== Brighton Ward ===
2022 South Australian local elections: Brighton Ward
Party	Candidate	Votes	%	±%
Independent	Jane Mary Fleming (elected)	unopposed		
Independent	Bob Snewin (elected)	unopposed		
Independent	Anthony John Venning (elected)	unopposed		

=== Seacliff Ward ===
2022 South Australian local elections: Seacliff Ward
Party	Candidate	Votes	%	±%
Independent	Clare Lindop (elected)	726	32.1	
Independent	Annette Bradshaw (elected)	667	29.5	
Independent	Susan Lonie (elected)	383	16.9	
Independent	Lynda Yates	323	14.3	
Independent	Aretta Holtman	164	7.2	
Total formal votes		2,263	98.1	
Informal votes		45	1.9	
Turnout		2,308		

== Kangaroo Island ==
2022 Kangaroo Island Council election
- 12 November 2022

All 9 seats on the Kangaroo Island Council
- Registered: 3,674
- Turnout: 2,206 (60.0%)
	First party
	IND
Party	Independent
Seats won	9
Primary vote	2,123
Percentage	100.0%

2022 South Australian local elections: Area Councillors
Party	Candidate	Votes	%	±%
Independent	Sam Mumford (elected)	454	21.4	
Independent	Jeanette Gellard (elected)	439	20.7	
Independent	Shirley Pledge (elected)	168	7.9	
Independent	Pat Austin (elected)	163	7.7	
Independent	Ken Liu (elected)	162	7.6	
Independent	Veronica Bates (elected)	159	7.5	
Independent	Bob Teasdale (elected)	143	6.7	
Independent	John Holmes	142	6.7	
Independent	Gregory Paul Miller (elected)	126	5.9	
Independent	Richard Thomas Cotterill (elected)	105	4.9	
Independent	Rosalie Chirgwin	62	2.9	
Total formal votes		2,123	96.2	
Informal votes		83	3.8	
Turnout		2,206		

== Karoonda East Murray ==
2022 District Council of Karoonda East Murray election
- 12 November 2022

All 6 seats on the District Council of Karoonda East Murray
- Registered: 745
- Turnout: 465 (62.4%)
	First party
	IND
Party	Independent
Seats won	6
Primary vote	462
Percentage	100.0%

2022 South Australian local elections: Area Councillors
Party	Candidate	Votes	%	±%
Independent	Darren Zadow (elected)	144	31.2	
Independent	Hannah Loller (elected)	102	22.1	
Independent	Russell Norman (elected)	51	11.0	
Independent	Greg Turner (elected)	36	7.8	
Independent	Simon Martin (elected)	35	7.6	
Independent	Gerry Paay (elected)	27	5.8	
Independent	Natalie Koch	21	4.5	
Independent	Malcom Paul Grosser	16	3.5	
Independent	Yvonne Smith	11	2.4	
Independent	Johanna Wilhelmina	11	2.4	
Independent	Chris Carter	8	1.7	
Total formal votes		462	99.4	
Informal votes		3	0.6	
Turnout		465		

== Kimba ==
2022 District Council of Kimba election
- 12 November 2022

6 of the 7 seats on the District Council of Kimba
- Registered: 750
	First party	Second party
		IND
Party	Ind. Liberal	Independent
Seats won	3	3
- Composition of the District Council of Kimba after the election

2022 South Australian local elections: Area Councillors
Party	Candidate	Votes	%	±%
Independent Liberal	Brian Stuart Cant (elected)	unopposed		
Independent	Jim Haskett (elected)	unopposed		
Independent Liberal	Dean Johnson (elected)	unopposed		
Independent	Megan Lienert (elected)	unopposed		
Independent Liberal	Peter Rayson (elected)	unopposed		
Independent	Anthony Francis Scott (elected)	unopposed		

== Kingston ==
2022 Kingston District Council election
- 12 November 2022

All 7 seats on the Kingston District Council
- Registered: 1,905
- Turnout: 1,160 (60.9%)
	First party	Second party
	IND
Party	Independent	Ind. Liberal
Seats won	4	3
Primary vote	670	472
Percentage	58.7%	41.3%
- Composition of the Kingston District Council after the election

2022 South Australian local elections: Area Councillors
Party	Candidate	Votes	%	±%
Independent Liberal	Fiona Rasheed (elected)	240	21.0	
Independent	Jeff Pope (elected)	172	15.1	
Independent	William Armfield (elected)	169	14.8	
Independent	James Starling (elected)	159	13.9	
Independent Liberal	Carol L Koch (elected)	121	10.6	
Independent Liberal	Chris England (elected)	111	9.7	
Independent	James Parkins	72	6.3	
Independent	Tim Harding (elected)	65	5.7	
Independent	Christopher Donald Charlton	33	2.9	
Total formal votes		1,142	98.4	
Informal votes		18	1.6	
Turnout		1,160		

== Light ==
2022 Light Regional Council election
- 12 November 2022

All 9 seats on the Light Regional Council
- Registered: 11,309
- Turnout: 4,105 (36.3%)

	First party	Second party	Third party
	IND
Party	Independent	Ind. Liberal	Ind. Greens
Seats won	7	1	1
Primary vote	3,360	403	250
Percentage	83.7%	10.0%	6.2%
- Composition of the Light Regional Council after the election

=== Dutton Ward ===
2022 South Australian local elections: Dutton Ward
Party	Candidate	Votes	%	±%
Independent	Colin Ross (elected)	466	24.8	
Independent	Deane Rohrlach (elected)	404	21.5	
Independent	Fabio Antonioli (elected)	277	14.8	
Independent	David Paul Mosley	184	9.8	
Independent	Cate Hunter	178	9.5	
Independent	Linda Goldfinch	142	7.6	
Independent	Jason Grain	140	7.5	
Independent Liberal	David Reginald Shannon	85	4.5	
Total formal votes		1,876	98.3	
Informal votes		32	1.7	
Turnout		1,908		

=== Light Ward ===
2022 South Australian local elections: Light Ward
Party	Candidate	Votes	%	±%
Independent	Lynette Reichstein (elected)	445	40.6	
Independent Greens	Simon Zeller (elected)	250	22.8	
Independent	Trevor Ryan	227	20.7	
Independent	Peter Kennelly (elected)	173	15.8	
Total formal votes		1,095	98.0	
Informal votes		22	2.0	
Turnout		1,117		

=== Mudla Wirra Ward ===
2022 South Australian local elections: Mudla Wirra Ward
Party	Candidate	Votes	%	±%
Independent	Bill Close (elected)	329	31.6	
Independent Liberal	Michael Phillips-Ryder (elected)	318	30.5	
Independent	Alyson Nicola Emery (elected)	290	27.8	
Independent	Grant Smith	105	10.1	
Total formal votes		1,042	96.5	
Informal votes		38	3.5	
Turnout		1,080		

== Lower Eyre Peninsula ==
2022 District Council of Lower Eyre Peninsula election
- 12 November 2022

All 7 seats on the District Council of Lower Eyre Peninsula
- Registered: 3,941
- Turnout: 1,693 (43.0%)

	First party	Second party	Third party
	IND
Party	Independent	Ind. Liberal	Ind. Labor
Seats won	5	1	1
Primary vote	785	697	165
Percentage	47.7%	42.3%	10.0%

2022 South Australian local elections: Area Councillors
Party	Candidate	Votes	%	±%
Independent Liberal	Jo-Anne Quigley (elected)	697	42.3	
Independent	Isaac Taylor (elected)	265	16.1	
Independent	Brett Howell (elected)	188	11.4	
Independent Labor	Margie Fahy (elected)	165	10.0	
Independent	Peter Mitchell (elected)	150	9.1	
Independent	Steve Woolley (elected)	89	5.4	
Independent	Neville Trezise (elected)	51	3.1	
Independent	Susanne Wegener	42	2.6	
Total formal votes		1,647	97.3	
Informal votes		46	2.7	
Turnout		1,693		

== Loxton Waikerie ==
2022 District Council of Loxton Waikerie election
- 12 November 2022

All 10 seats on the District Council of Loxton Waikerie
- Registered: 8,404
- Turnout: 4,521 (53.8%)
	First party	Second party
	IND
Party	Independent	Ind. Liberal
Seats won	7	3
Primary vote	3,219	1,091
Percentage	74.7%	25.3%
- Composition of the District Council of Loxton Waikerie after the election

2022 South Australian local elections: Area Councillors
Party	Candidate	Votes	%	±%
Independent	Sonya Altschwager (elected)	565	13.1	
Independent	Sonia Fowler (elected)	558	12.9	
Independent Liberal	Michael Vowles (elected)	474	11.0	
Independent	Gary Pfeiler (elected)	436	10.1	
Independent Liberal	Michelle Hill (elected)	424	9.8	
Independent	Ian Light (elected)	346	8.0	
Independent	Craig Ferber (elected)	341	7.9	
Independent	Jody Flavel (elected)	288	6.7	
Independent	Clive Matthews (elected)	235	5.5	
Independent	Terry Wheeldon	196	4.5	
Independent Liberal	Kent Andrew (elected)	193	4.5	
Independent	Frances Simes	134	3.1	
Independent	Kym Webber	120	2.8	
Total formal votes		4,310	95.3	
Informal votes		211	4.7	
Turnout		4,521		

== Marion ==
2022 City of Marion election
- 12 November 2022

All 12 seats on the City of Marion
- Registered: 68,556
- Turnout: 19,445 (28.4%)

	First party	Second party	Third party
	IND
Party	Independent	Ind. Labor	Ind. Liberal
Seats won	9	1	1
Primary vote	13,234	2,252	1,907
Percentage	70.8%	12.0%	10.2%
	Fourth party
Party	Ind. Greens
Seats won	1
Primary vote	934
Percentage	5.0%
- Composition of the City of Marion after the election

=== Mullawirra Ward ===
2022 South Australian local elections: Mullawirra Ward
Party	Candidate	Votes	%	±%
Independent	Jason Veliskou (elected)	1,625	52.2	
Independent	Amar Singh (elected)	932	29.9	
Independent	Les Golding	559	17.9	
Total formal votes		3,116	93.8	
Informal votes		205	6.2	
Turnout		3,321		

=== Woodlands Ward ===
2022 South Australian local elections: Woodlands Ward
Party	Candidate	Votes	%	±%
Independent	Joseph Masika (elected)	850	25.8	
Independent Labor	Johar Kumar	809	24.6	
Independent Labor	Jayne Hoffmann (elected)	669	20.3	
Independent	Julian Thompson	266	8.1	
Independent	Kirsty Lyn Lithgow	260	7.9	
Independent	Emma Morrison	157	4.8	
Independent	Andrew James Stasinowsky	131	4.0	
Independent	Nick Perry	97	2.9	
Independent	Warren John Phillips	53	1.6	
Total formal votes		3,292	97.4	
Informal votes		87	2.6	
Turnout		3,379		

=== Warracowie Ward ===
2022 South Australian local elections: Warracowie Ward
Party	Candidate	Votes	%	±%
Independent	Nathan John Prior (elected)	1,061	33.6	
Independent	Bradley Broad	520	16.5	
Independent	Matt Taylor (elected)	518	16.4	
Independent Liberal	Jerome David Appleby	355	11.2	
Independent Labor	Jagjit Sethi	221	7.0	
Independent	Chris Metevelis	183	5.8	
Independent	Chris Thipthorp	181	5.7	
Independent Liberal	Sanjay Madhukar Raje	122	3.9	
Total formal votes		3,161	96.4	
Informal votes		118	3.6	
Turnout		3,279		

=== Warriparinga Ward ===
2022 South Australian local elections: Warriparinga Ward
Party	Candidate	Votes	%	±%
Independent	Renuka Lama (elected)	955	29.8	
Independent	Raelene Telfer (elected)	942	29.3	
Independent Labor	Erik Rasmussen	553	17.2	
Independent	Peter Portway	489	15.2	
Independent	Anne Barbara	271	8.4	
Total formal votes		3,210	96.0	
Informal votes		133	4.0	
Turnout		3,343		

=== Coastal Ward ===
2022 South Australian local elections: Coastal Ward
Party	Candidate	Votes	%	±%
Independent Greens	Sarah Luscombe (elected)	934	28.5	
Independent	Ian Crossland (elected)	841	25.7	
Independent	Fleur Lerwill	609	18.6	
Ind. Liberal Democratic	Jonathan Parkin	368	11.2	
Independent	Blake Derer	353	10.8	
Independent	Peter Dunn	173	5.3	
Total formal votes		3,278	97.1	
Informal votes		98	2.9	
Turnout		3,376		

=== Southern Hills Ward ===
2022 South Australian local elections: Southern Hills Ward
Party	Candidate	Votes	%	±%
Independent	Luke Naismith (elected)	750	28.4	
Independent Liberal	Jana Ruth Mates (elected)	742	28.1	
Independent Liberal	Matthew Shilling	688	26.1	
Independent	Maggie May Duncan	458	17.4	
Total formal votes		2,638	96.0	
Informal votes		109	4.0	
Turnout		2,747		

== Mid Murray ==
2022 Mid Murray Council election
- 12 November 2022

All 8 seats on the Mid Murray Council
- Registered: 6,987
- Turnout: 1,460 (20.9%)
	First party
	IND
Party	Independent
Seats won	8
Primary vote	1,423
Percentage	100.0%

=== Eyre Ward ===
2022 South Australian local elections: Eyre Ward
Party	Candidate	Votes	%	±%
Independent	Jen Davis (elected)	206	29.2	
Independent	Leonard Forrester (elected)	197	27.9	
Independent	Wayne Tredrea	168	23.8	
Independent	Jakob Gamertsfelder	134	19.0	
Total formal votes		705	97.0	
Informal votes		22	3.0	
Turnout		727		

=== Shearer Ward ===
2022 South Australian local elections: Shearer Ward
Party	Candidate	Votes	%	±%
Independent	Kelly Gladigau (elected)	unopposed		
Independent	Victoria Hammond (elected)	unopposed		
Independent	Kirsty MacGregor (elected)	unopposed		
Independent	Mandy Toczek McPeake (elected)	unopposed		

=== Murray Ward ===
2022 South Australian local elections: Murray Ward
Party	Candidate	Votes	%	±%
Independent	Geoff Barber (elected)	193	26.9	
Independent	Roslyn Schultz (elected)	139	19.4	
Independent	Jim Moss	122	17.0	
Independent	Jayne Barnes	113	15.7	
Independent	Kitty Schiansky	87	12.1	
Independent	Kristine Sims	64	8.9	
Total formal votes		718	98.0	
Informal votes		15	2.0	
Turnout		733		

== Mitcham ==
2022 City of Mitcham election
- 12 November 2022

All 12 seats on the City of Mitcham
- Registered: 49,481
- Turnout: 17,098 (34.6%)

	First party	Second party	Third party
	IND
Party	Independent	Ind. Liberal	Ind. Labor
Seats won	9	1	1
Primary vote	12,441	2,136	1,041
Percentage	74.8%	12.8%	6.3%
	Fourth party
Party	Ind. Greens
Seats won	1
Primary vote	1,005
Percentage	6.0%
- Composition of the City of Mitcham after the election

=== Boorman Ward ===
2022 South Australian local elections: Boorman Ward
Party	Candidate	Votes	%	±%
Independent	Joanna Wells (elected)	1,096	39.1	
Independent	Andrew Playford Tilley (elected)	777	27.7	
Independent Liberal	Adriana Christopoulos	611	21.8	
Independent	Robyn Kosmider	318	11.3	
Total formal votes		2,802	97.9	
Informal votes		60	2.1	
Turnout		2,862		

=== Gault Ward ===
2022 South Australian local elections: Gault Ward
Party	Candidate	Votes	%	±%
Independent	Rod Moss (elected)	681	24.5	
Independent Liberal	Pia George (elected)	561	20.2	
Independent	Ashley Westbrook	448	16.1	
Independent Greens	Sim Dhaliwal	444	15.9	
Independent Labor	James Hallahan	336	12.1	
Independent	Luke Hutchinson	314	11.3	
Total formal votes		2,784	98.8	
Informal votes		33	1.2	
Turnout		2,817		

=== Overton Ward ===
2022 South Australian local elections: Overton Ward
Party	Candidate	Votes	%	±%
Independent	Kamal Bhagat (elected)	692	31.2	
Independent Greens	Jane Bange (elected)	561	25.3	
Independent	Danielle Stojani	431	19.4	
Independent	John Denlay	280	12.6	
Independent	Jonathan Buob	134	6.0	
Independent	Dave Munro	121	5.5	
Total formal votes		2,219	97.1	
Informal votes		67	2.9	
Turnout		2,286		

=== Babbage Ward ===
2022 South Australian local elections: Babbage Ward
Party	Candidate	Votes	%	±%
Independent	Yvonne Todd (elected)	871	32.9	
Independent Labor	Aidan Greenshields (elected)	705	26.6	
Independent	Sesh Vidyam	591	22.3	
Independent Liberal	Ellen Avery	480	18.1	
Total formal votes		2,647	97.0	
Informal votes		82	3.0	
Turnout		2,729		

=== Craigburn Ward ===
2022 South Australian local elections: Craigburn Ward
Party	Candidate	Votes	%	±%
Independent	Karen Hockley (elected)	1,991	65.5	
Independent Liberal	David Jesse Dienes	484	15.9	
Independent	Darren Kruse (elected)	423	13.9	
Independent	Scott Rouse	144	4.7	
Total formal votes		3,042	96.6	
Informal votes		107	3.4	
Turnout		3,149		

=== The Park Ward ===
2022 South Australian local elections: The Park Ward
Party	Candidate	Votes	%	±%
Independent	Tom Morrison (elected)	1,851	59.2	
Independent	Corin McCarthy (elected)	685	21.9	
Independent	Kellie Stocker	593	19.0	
Total formal votes		3,129	96.1	
Informal votes		126	3.9	
Turnout		3,255		

== Mount Barker ==
2022 Mount Barker District Council election
- 12 November 2022

All 10 seats on the Mount Barker District Council
- Registered: 28,742
- Turnout: 10,553 (36.7%)

	First party	Second party	Third party
	IND
Party	Independent	Ind. Liberal	Ind. Greens
Seats won	7	2	1
Primary vote	7,268	1,713	704
Percentage	70.5%	16.6%	6.8%
- Composition of the Mount Barker District Council after the election

=== North Ward ===
2022 South Australian local elections: North Ward
Party	Candidate	Votes	%	±%
Independent	Jessica Szilassy (elected)	1,117	38.9	
Independent	Simon Westwood (elected)	1,024	35.7	
Independent	Harry Seager (elected)	587	20.5	
Independent	Susan Willa Hamilton	142	4.9	
Total formal votes		2,870	98.0	
Informal votes		59	2.0	
Turnout		2,929		

=== Central Ward ===
2022 South Australian local elections: Central Ward
Party	Candidate	Votes	%	±%
Independent	Sally Harding (elected)	1,312	30.6	
Independent Liberal	Bradley Orr (elected)	1,016	23.7	
Independent	Samantha Jean Jones (elected)	744	17.4	
Independent Greens	Ian David Grosser (elected)	704	16.4	
Independent	Janette Size	507	11.8	
Total formal votes		4,283	97.6	
Informal votes		104	2.4	
Turnout		4,387		

=== South Ward ===
2022 South Australian local elections: South Ward
Party	Candidate	Votes	%	±%
Independent	Narelle Hardingham (elected)	809	25.6	
Independent	Richard Coombe (elected)	729	23.1	
Independent Liberal	Rebecca Hewett (elected)	697	22.0	
Independent Labor	Rowan Roy Voogt	629	19.9	
Independent	Bill Hankin	297	9.4	
Total formal votes		3,161	97.7	
Informal votes		76	2.3	
Turnout		3,237		

== Mount Gambier ==
2022 City of Mount Gambier election
- 12 November 2022

All 8 seats on the City of Mount Gambier
- Registered: 20,190
- Turnout: 8,162 (40.4%)
	First party	Second party
	IND
Party	Independent	Ind. Liberal
Seats won	7	1
Primary vote	6,130	1,736
Percentage	77.9%	22.1%
- Composition of the City of Mount Gambier after the election

2022 South Australian local elections: Area Councillors
Party	Candidate	Votes	%	±%
Independent Liberal	Ben Hood (elected)	1,572	20.0	
Independent	Max Bruins (elected)	1,186	15.1	
Independent	Sonya Mezinec (elected)	1,012	12.9	
Independent	Josh Lynagh (elected)	764	9.7	
Independent	Paul Jenner (elected)	566	7.2	
Independent	Kate Amoroso (elected)	389	4.9	
Independent	Frank Morello (elected)	379	4.8	
Independent	Jason Virgo	326	4.1	
Independent	Mark Lovett (elected)	314	4.0	
Independent	Ian David von Stanke	307	3.9	
Independent	Bruce Sebastian Morale	268	3.4	
Independent	Justin Edwards	213	2.7	
Independent Liberal	Llew Jones	164	2.1	
Independent	Steve Paleokastritis	154	2.0	
Independent	Alysha Herrmann	119	1.5	
Independent	Owen Drinkell	60	0.8	
Independent	Kevin Raedel	48	0.6	
Independent	Scott James Turner	25	0.3	
Total formal votes		7,866	96.4	
Informal votes		296	3.6	
Turnout		8,162		

== Mount Remarkable ==
2022 District Council of Mount Remarkable election
- 12 November 2022

3 of the 4 seats on the District Council of Mount Remarkable
- Registered: 2,189
	First party	Second party
	IND
Party	Independent	Ind. Labor
Seats won	2	1
- Composition of the District Council of Mount Remarkable after the election

2022 South Australian local elections: Area Councillors
Party	Candidate	Votes	%	±%
Independent	Ian Keller (elected)	unopposed		
Independent	Colin Edward Nottle (elected)	unopposed		
Independent Labor	Lesley Till (elected)	unopposed		

== Murray Bridge ==
2022 Rural City of Murray Bridge election
- 12 November 2022

All 9 seats on the Rural City of Murray Bridge
- Registered: 15,550
- Turnout: 5,619 (36.1%)
	First party	Second party	Third party
	IND	AJP
Party	Independent	Ind. Animal Justice	Ind. Labor
Seats won	7	1	1
Primary vote	4,793	296	248
Percentage	89.8%	5.5%	4.6%
- Composition of the Rural City of Murray Bridge after the election

2022 South Australian local elections: Area Councillors
Party	Candidate	Votes	%	±%
Independent	Airlie Keen (elected)	860	16.1	
Independent	Tom Haig (elected)	735	13.8	
Independent	Andrew Baltensperger (elected)	630	11.8	
Independent	John de Michele (elected)	608	11.4	
Independent	Fred Toogood (elected)	521	9.8	
Independent	Clem Schubert (elected)	442	8.3	
Independent	Lisa Ann Courtney (elected)	392	7.3	
Ind. Animal Justice	Karen Jane Eckermann (elected)	296	5.5	
Independent Labor	Mat O'Brien (elected)	248	4.6	
Independent	Jagtar Singh	139	2.6	
Independent	Liam Richardson	108	2.0	
Independent	Jean-Marie Uwihoreye	99	1.9	
Independent	Josephine O'Toole	98	1.8	
Independent	Mellissa Anne McInerney	93	1.7	
Independent	Monica Perrett	68	1.3	
Total formal votes		5,337	95.0	
Informal votes		282	5.0	
Turnout		5,619		

== Naracoorte Lucindale ==
2022 Naracoorte Lucindale Council election
- 12 November 2022

All 10 seats on the Naracoorte Lucindale Council
- Registered: 5,909
- Turnout: 3,533 (59.8%)
	First party	Second party
	IND
Party	Independent	Ind. Liberal
Seats won	8	2
Primary vote	2,700	695
Percentage	79.5%	20.5%
- Composition of the Naracoorte Lucindale Council after the election

2022 South Australian local elections: Area Councillors
Party	Candidate	Votes	%	±%
Independent	Cameron Grundy (elected)	509	15.0	
Independent	Craig William McGuire (elected)	391	11.5	
Independent Liberal	Tom Dennis (elected)	329	9.7	
Independent	Monique Crossling (elected)	325	9.6	
Independent	Abigail Goodman (elected)	240	7.1	
Independent	Trevor Rayner (elected)	210	6.2	
Independent	Damien Ross (elected)	204	6.0	
Independent	Andrew Downward (elected)	174	5.1	
Independent Liberal	Julie Earl	156	4.6	
Independent	Peter Bruce Ireland (elected)	156	4.6	
Independent	Peter Shepherd	153	4.5	
Independent	Danielle Moore	137	4.0	
Independent Liberal	Darren Turner (elected)	135	4.0	
Independent	Toby Robinson	103	3.0	
Independent	Ken Banning	98	2.9	
Independent Liberal	Derek Wilf James	75	2.2	
Total formal votes		3,395	96.1	
Informal votes		138	3.9	
Turnout		3,533		

== Northern Areas ==
2022 Northern Areas Council election
- 12 November 2022

All 5 seats on the Northern Areas Council
- Registered: 3,502
- Turnout: 532 (15.2%)
	First party	Second party
	IND
Party	Independent	Ind. Labor
Seats won	4	1
Primary vote	532	0
Percentage	100.0%	0.0%

=== Broughton Ward ===
2022 South Australian local elections: Broughton Ward
Party	Candidate	Votes	%	±%
Independent Labor	Ben Browne (elected)	unopposed		

=== Rocky River Ward ===
2022 South Australian local elections: Rocky River Ward
Party	Candidate	Votes	%	±%
Independent	Denise Higgins (elected)	210	39.5	
Independent	John Barberien (elected)	162	30.5	
Independent	Sue Scarman (elected)	70	13.2	
Independent	Kathy Webb	67	12.6	
Independent	Jordan Nussey	23	4.3	
Total formal votes		532	99.3	
Informal votes		4	0.7	
Turnout		536		

=== Yackamoorundie Ward ===
2022 South Australian local elections: Yackamoorundie Ward
Party	Candidate	Votes	%	±%
Independent	Ian Robert Pomerenke (elected)	unopposed		

== Norwood Payneham & St Peters ==
2022 City of Norwood Payneham & St Peters election
- 12 November 2022

All 13 seats on the City of Norwood Payneham & St Peters
- Registered: 26,211
- Turnout: 7,287 (27.8%)

	First party	Second party	Third party
	IND
Party	Independent	Ind. Labor	Ind. Liberal
Seats won	10	2	1
Primary vote	5,057	1,186	780
Percentage	71.7%	16.8%	11.1%

=== St Peters Ward ===
2022 South Australian local elections: St Peters Ward
Party	Candidate	Votes	%	±%
Independent	Kester Moorhouse (elected)	739	51.4	
Independent Labor	Claire Clutterham (elected)	253	17.6	
Independent	Andrew Tarca	146	10.2	
Independent	Sam Diprose	136	9.5	
Independent	Carrie Phillis	131	9.1	
Ind. Liberal Democratic	Diane Lee	33	2.3	
Total formal votes		1,438	98.6	
Informal votes		21	1.4	
Turnout		1,459		

=== Torrens Ward ===
2022 South Australian local elections: Torrens Ward
Party	Candidate	Votes	%	±%
Independent	Hugh Daniel Holfeld (elected)	649	50.5	
Independent	John Minney	320	24.9	
Independent	Garry John Knoblauch (elected)	317	24.7	
Total formal votes		1,286	94.8	
Informal votes		71	5.2	
Turnout		1,357		

=== Payneham Ward ===
2022 South Australian local elections: Payneham Ward
Party	Candidate	Votes	%	±%
Independent	Kevin John Duke (elected)	483	40.2	
Independent	Josh Robinson (elected)	358	29.8	
Independent Labor	Trent Williams Ames	200	16.6	
Independent Liberal	Shahin Sayyar Dashti	91	7.6	
Independent Liberal	Raymond George Robertson	70	5.8	
Total formal votes		1,202	96.9	
Informal votes		39	3.1	
Turnout		1,241		

=== Maylands/Trinity Ward ===
2022 South Australian local elections: Maylands/Trinity Ward
Party	Candidate	Votes	%	±%
Independent Liberal	Victoria McFarlane (elected)	619	33.4	
Independent	Connie Granozio (elected)	584	31.5	
Independent Labor	Scott Sims (elected)	451	24.3	
Independent	Max Franchitto	201	10.8	
Total formal votes		1,855	96.9	
Informal votes		59	3.1	
Turnout		1,914		

=== West Norwood/Kent Town Ward ===
2022 South Australian local elections: West Norwood/Kent Town Ward
Party	Candidate	Votes	%	±%
Independent	Grant Piggott (elected)	unopposed		
Independent	Sue Whitington (elected)	unopposed		

=== Kensington/East Norwood Ward ===
2022 South Australian local elections: Kensington/East Norwood Ward
Party	Candidate	Votes	%	±%
Independent	Christel Mex (elected)	761	59.7	
Independent Labor	Robert Spinelli Seals	282	22.1	
Independent	John Callisto (elected)	232	18.2	
Total formal votes		1,275	96.9	
Informal votes		41	3.1	
Turnout		1,316		

== Onkaparinga ==
2022 City of Onkaparinga election
- 12 November 2022

All 12 seats on the City of Onkaparinga
- Registered: 131,498
- Turnout: 32,699 (24.9%)

	First party	Second party	Third party
	IND
Party	Independent	Ind. Labor	Ind. Liberal
Seats won	10	1	1
Primary vote	25,676	2,286	1,259
Percentage	82.9%	7.4%	4.1%
- Composition of the City of Onkaparinga after the election

=== South Coast Ward ===
2022 South Australian local elections: South Coast Ward
Party	Candidate	Votes	%	±%
Independent	Paul Yeomans (elected)	1,341	23.0	
Independent	Lauren Jew (elected)	1,100	18.9	
Independent Greens	Sean Weatherly	785	13.5	
Independent	Stephen Spence	539	9.3	
Independent	Josh Reiter	522	9.0	
Independent	Beth Rex	507	8.7	
Independent	Steven Cook	504	8.6	
Independent	Victor Kashyap	226	3.9	
Independent	Daniel Hennigan	224	3.8	
Independent	Robin Lewis	79	1.4	
Total formal votes		5,827	95.5	
Informal votes		273	4.5	
Turnout		6,100		

=== Mid Coast Ward ===
2022 South Australian local elections: Mid Coast Ward
Party	Candidate	Votes	%	±%
Independent	Dan Platten (elected)	1,024	17.9	
Independent	Gretel Wilkes (elected)	889	15.5	
Independent	Luke Munro	696	12.2	
Independent	Fergus Walpole	557	9.7	
Independent	Mandy Perrymeant	537	9.4	
Independent	Suzanne Tonkin	456	8.0	
Independent Labor	Mark Dibdin	449	7.8	
Independent Labor	Callum Barrott-Walsh	446	7.8	
Independent	Russell Jackson	440	7.7	
Independent	Elijah Bravington	232	4.1	
Total formal votes		5,726	95.1	
Informal votes		294	4.9	
Turnout		6,020		

=== Knox Ward ===
2022 South Australian local elections: Knox Ward
Party	Candidate	Votes	%	±%
Independent	Heidi Greaves (elected)	870	20.4	
Independent	Alayna de Graaf	766	18.0	
Independent	Colt Stafford (elected)	730	17.1	
Independent	David Whan	713	16.7	
Independent	Katrina Schirmer	450	10.6	
Independent	Jacqueline Chalmers	350	8.2	
Independent Liberal	Shane Carter	264	6.2	
Independent	Joyal James	114	2.7	
Total formal votes		4,257	91.6	
Informal votes		390	8.4	
Turnout		4,647		

=== Pimpala Ward ===
2022 South Australian local elections: Pimpala Ward
Party	Candidate	Votes	%	±%
Independent	Michael John Fisher (elected)	1,362	28.1	
Independent	Kevin Rilett (elected)	983	20.3	
Independent	Sandra Brown	695	14.3	
Independent	Debra Hocking	491	10.1	
Independent	Daniel John Lae Powyer-Taylor	474	9.8	
Independent	Michael O'Brien	471	9.7	
Independent	Belinda Howden	368	7.6	
Total formal votes		4,844	94.6	
Informal votes		277	5.4	
Turnout		5,121		

=== Thalassa Ward ===
2022 South Australian local elections: Thalassa Ward
Party	Candidate	Votes	%	±%
Independent	Geoff Eaton (elected)	1,717	33.5	
Independent Liberal	Marion Themeliotis (elected)	995	19.4	
Independent Greens	John Photakis	952	18.6	
Independent	Philip Chabrel	536	10.5	
Independent	Helen Rochford	496	9.7	
Independent	Ilona Harley	424	8.3	
Total formal votes		5,120	95.9	
Informal votes		218	4.1	
Turnout		5,338		

=== Southern Vale Ward ===
2022 South Australian local elections: Southern Vale Ward
Party	Candidate	Votes	%	±%
Independent Labor	Marisa Bell (elected)	1,391	26.8	
Independent	Wayne Olsen	831	16.0	
Independent	Jordan Pritchard (elected)	766	14.8	
Independent	John Humphries	570	11.0	
Independent	Matthew Fossey	532	10.3	
Independent	Colin Baker	401	7.7	
Independent	Wayne Tassell	355	6.8	
Independent	Gail Kilby	338	6.5	
Total formal votes		5,184	94.7	
Informal votes		289	5.3	
Turnout		5,473		

== Orroroo Carrieton ==
2022 District Council of Orroroo Carrieton election
- 12 November 2022

All 6 seats on the District Council of Orroroo Carrieton
- Registered: 666
	First party
	IND
Party	Independent
Seats won	6

2022 South Australian local elections: Area Councillors
Party	Candidate	Votes	%	±%
Independent	Kathie Bowman (elected)	unopposed		
Independent	Grant Chapman (elected)	unopposed		
Independent	Joylene Ford (elected)	unopposed		
Independent	Ralph Goehring (elected)	unopposed		
Independent	Col Parkyn (elected)	unopposed		
Independent	Jessica Watson (elected)	unopposed		

== Peterborough ==
2022 District Council of Peterborough election
- 12 November 2022

All 8 seats on the District Council of Peterborough
- Registered: 1,243
- Turnout: 770 (61.9%)
	First party
	IND
Party	Independent
Seats won	8
Primary vote	754
Percentage	100.0%

2022 South Australian local elections: Area Councillors
Party	Candidate	Votes	%	±%
Independent	Cassandra Chambers (elected)	194	25.7	
Independent	Graham Mercer (elected)	173	22.9	
Independent	Michael Burford (elected)	93	12.3	
Independent	Teena Martin (elected)	58	7.7	
Independent	Kim Miller (elected)	52	6.9	
Independent	Raymond Hotchin (elected)	51	6.8	
Independent	Neil Hucks (elected)	50	6.6	
Independent	Russell Sleep (elected)	46	6.1	
Independent	Donna Taverner	20	2.7	
Independent	Judith Kempen	17	2.3	
Total formal votes		754	97.9	
Informal votes		16	2.1	
Turnout		770		

== Playford ==
2022 City of Playford election
- 12 November 2022

All 15 seats on the City of Playford
- Registered: 67,965
- Turnout: 18,018 (26.5%)
	First party	Second party
	IND
Party	Independent	Ind. Labor
Seats won	9	6
Primary vote	10,529	5,914
Percentage	60.6%	34.1%
- Result per wards

=== Ward 1 ===
2022 South Australian local elections: Ward 1
Party	Candidate	Votes	%	±%
Independent	Peter Rentoulis (elected)	915	23.0	
Independent Labor	Rebecca Vandepeear (elected)	737	18.5	
Independent Labor	Clint Marsh (elected)	717	18.0	
Independent	Dino Musolino	557	14.0	
Independent Labor	Possible Diessa	320	8.0	
Independent Family First	Gary Balfort	177	4.4	
Independent	Phillip Nicol	158	4.0	
Independent	Cathy Tame	150	3.8	
Independent	Victoria Douglas	97	2.4	
Independent	Rita McDonald	92	2.3	
Independent	Rita Kuhlmann	64	1.6	
Total formal votes		3,984	96.7	
Informal votes		138	3.3	
Turnout		4,122		

=== Ward 2 ===
2022 South Australian local elections: Ward 2
Party	Candidate	Votes	%	±%
Independent Labor	Chantelle Karlsen (elected)	825	20.2	
Independent	Jane Onuzans (elected)	738	18.1	
Independent	Gay Smallwood-Smith (elected)	580	14.2	
Independent	Kym Hanton	457	11.2	
Independent	Stephen Coppins	308	7.6	
Independent Labor	Donna-Marie Currey	300	7.4	
Independent	Corina James	282	6.9	
Independent	Russell Davies	258	6.3	
Independent	Modeste Hatungimana	175	4.3	
Independent Liberal	Puskar Sharma Poudyal	152	3.7	
Total formal votes		4,075	96.7	
Informal votes		137	3.3	
Turnout		4,212		

=== Ward 3 ===
2022 South Australian local elections: Ward 3
Party	Candidate	Votes	%	±%
Independent	David Kerrison (elected)	849	27.6	
Independent	Tanya Smiljanic (elected)	384	12.5	
Independent	Andrew Craig (elected)	383	12.4	
Independent	Joe Federico	339	11.0	
Independent	Clare Louise Rae	267	8.7	
Independent	Veronica Gossink	214	7.0	
Independent	Tom O'Donnell	201	6.5	
Independent Labor	Ahmad Amani	167	5.4	
Independent	Lainie Southern	150	4.9	
Independent Family First	Sanja Hendrick	125	4.1	
Total formal votes		3,079	97.7	
Informal votes		73	2.3	
Turnout		3,152		

=== Ward 4 ===
2022 South Australian local elections: Ward 4
Party	Candidate	Votes	%	±%
Independent	Marilyn Baker (elected)	637	21.7	
Independent Labor	Zahra Bayani (elected)	604	20.6	
Independent	Katrina Stroet (elected)	266	9.1	
Independent	Rae Holfter	255	8.7	
Independent Liberal	Denis Davey	248	8.5	
Independent Labor	Lisa Kranz	237	8.1	
Independent	Sara Walker	188	6.4	
Independent Liberal	Ram Acharya	170	5.8	
Independent	Terry Stuart	149	5.1	
Independent	Chris Horsell	73	2.5	
Independent Liberal	Mohammad Ali	52	1.8	
Independent	Benjamin Parkin	50	1.7	
Total formal votes		2,929	94.9	
Informal votes		157	5.1	
Turnout		3,086		

=== Ward 5 ===
2022 South Australian local elections: Ward 5
Party	Candidate	Votes	%	±%
Independent Labor	Akram Arifi (elected)	1,260	38.2	
Independent Labor	Misty Norris (elected)	747	22.6	
Independent	Shirley Halls	448	13.6	
Independent	Mark Shaw	385	11.7	
Independent	Matthew Retallick	272	8.2	
Independent	Tammy Callaghan	188	5.7	
Total formal votes		3,300	95.8	
Informal votes		146	4.2	
Turnout		3,446		

== Port Adelaide Enfield ==
2022 City of Port Adelaide Enfield election
- 12 November 2022

All 17 seats on the City of Port Adelaide Enfield
- Registered: 89,021
- Turnout: 29,128 (32.7%)

	First party	Second party	Third party
	IND
Party	Independent	Ind. Labor	Ind. Greens
Seats won	9	7	1
Primary vote	15,202	10,721	718
Percentage	53.6%	37.8%	2.5%

=== Outer Harbor Ward ===
2022 South Australian local elections: Outer Harbor Ward
Party	Candidate	Votes	%	±%
Independent	Vanessa Tulloch (elected)	1,451	47.9	
Independent	Adrian Wotton (elected)	744	24.6	
Independent	John Le Raye	323	10.7	
Independent	Emma Lipson	254	8.4	
Independent Labor	Mark Smith	154	5.1	
Independent	Wally Pluta	101	3.3	
Total formal votes		3,027	98.2	
Informal votes		56	1.8	
Turnout		3,083		

=== Semaphore Ward ===
2022 South Australian local elections: Semaphore Ward
Party	Candidate	Votes	%	±%
Independent Labor	David Wilkins (elected)	893	28.0	
Independent	Peter McGregor (elected)	884	27.7	
Independent	Helen Wright	804	25.2	
Independent Liberal	Chad McLaren	221	6.9	
Independent Labor	Ignatius Lineage	198	6.2	
Independent	Jamie Witt	188	5.9	
Total formal votes		3,188	98.9	
Informal votes		35	1.1	
Turnout		3,223		

=== Port Adelaide Ward ===
2022 South Australian local elections: Port Adelaide Ward
Party	Candidate	Votes	%	±%
Independent Labor	Steve Vines (elected)	1,015	33.1	
Independent	Joost den Hartog (elected)	1,001	32.6	
Independent	Martina Thompson	445	14.5	
Independent Liberal	Scott Anderson	261	8.5	
Independent Labor	Jason Lailey	206	6.7	
Independent	Denzyl Sardinha	143	4.7	
Total formal votes		3,071	98.1	
Informal votes		58	1.9	
Turnout		3,129		

=== Parks Ward ===
2022 South Australian local elections: Parks Ward
Party	Candidate	Votes	%	±%
Independent Labor	Kim Dinh (elected)	1,989	40.8	
Independent	Kat Mitchell (elected)	986	20.2	
Independent Labor	Wasim Saeed (elected)	775	15.9	
Independent	Anna Pleh	497	10.2	
Independent	John Croci	407	8.3	
Independent Labor	Sadanand More	224	4.6	
Total formal votes		4,878	96.3	
Informal votes		189	3.7	
Turnout		5,067		

=== Enfield Ward ===
2022 South Australian local elections: Enfield Ward
Party	Candidate	Votes	%	±%
Independent Labor	Olivia Colombo (elected)	2,188	42.0	
Independent	Carol Martin (elected)	1,473	28.3	
Independent	Barbara Clayton (elected)	1,005	19.3	
Independent	Mihir Shinde	547	10.5	
Total formal votes		5,213	96.3	
Informal votes		202	3.7	
Turnout		5,415		

=== Klemzig Ward ===
2022 South Australian local elections: Klemzig Ward
Party	Candidate	Votes	%	±%
Independent Labor	Hannah Evans (elected)	990	33.6	
Independent	Paul Russell (elected)	770	26.1	
Independent	Paul Barbaro	375	12.7	
Independent Liberal	Haritha Yara	360	12.2	
Independent Liberal	Janice McShane	349	11.8	
Independent	Rahul Gadhia	105	3.6	
Total formal votes		2,949	97.2	
Informal votes		85	2.8	
Turnout		3,034		

=== Northfield Ward ===
2022 South Australian local elections: Northfield Ward
Party	Candidate	Votes	%	±%
Independent Labor	Matt Osborn (elected)	2,089	34.6	
Independent	Mark Basham (elected)	1,794	29.7	
Independent Greens	Lazaras Panayiotou (elected)	718	11.9	
Independent	Nayan Darji	675	11.2	
Independent Liberal	Jin Wook Yoon	540	8.9	
Independent	Hafiz Dostizada	230	3.8	
Total formal votes		6,046	97.9	
Informal votes		131	2.1	
Turnout		6,177		
