= City of Campbelltown =

Campbelltown City or the City of Campbelltown may refer to:

- Campbelltown City SC, association football club in South Australia
- City of Campbelltown (New South Wales), a local government area in Sydney, New South Wales, Australia
- City of Campbelltown (South Australia), a local government area in Adelaide, South Australia
