= Newton, South Australia =

Newton
- Suburb
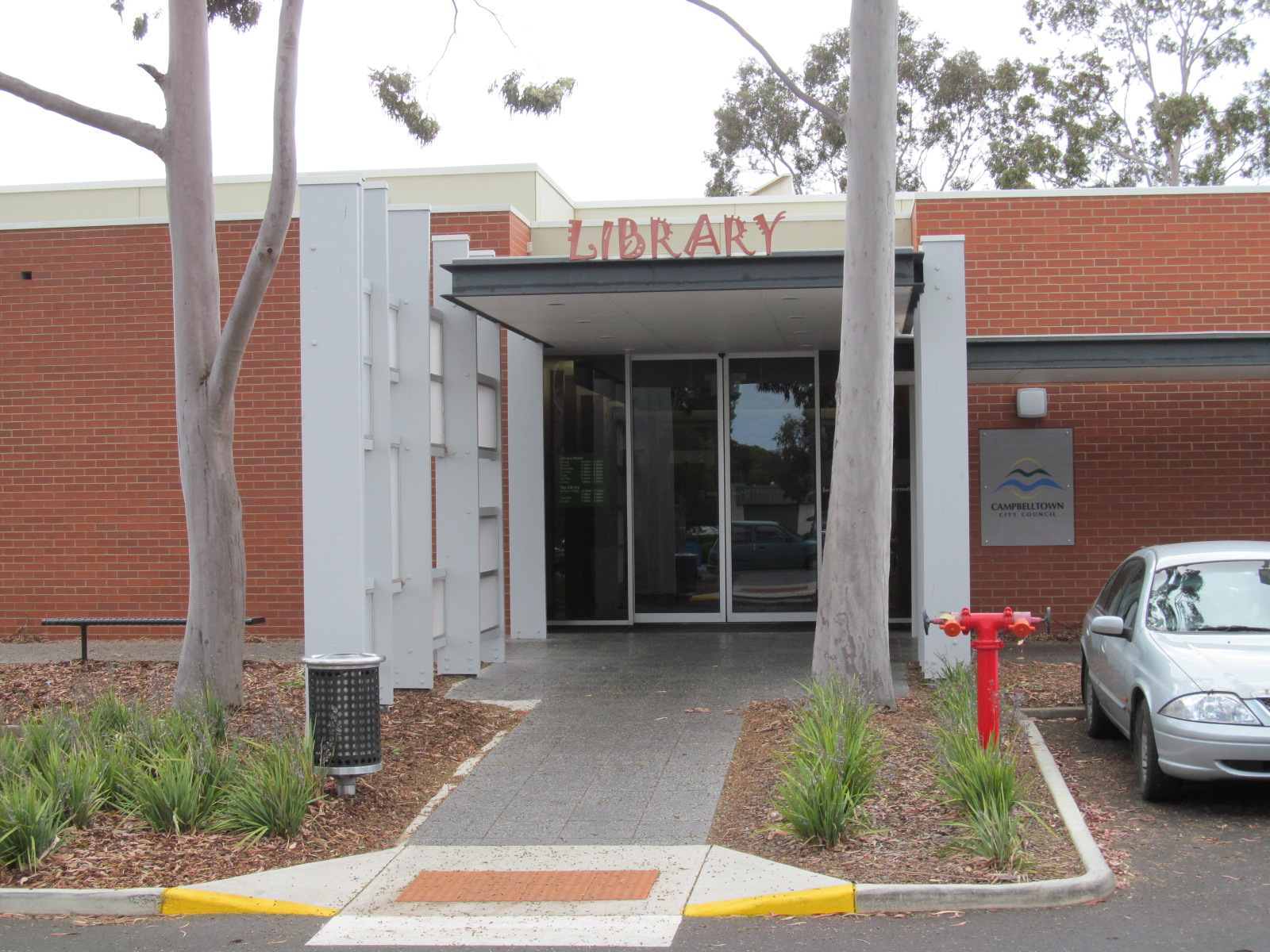
- Campbelltown library located in Newton

- Country: Australia
- State: South Australia
- City: Adelaide
- LGA: City of Campbelltown
- Location: 10 km (6.2 mi) NE of Adelaide city centre
- Established: 1854

Government
  - State electorate: Hartley
  - Federal division: Sturt

Population
  - Total: 5,117 (SAL 2021)
- Postcode: 5074
Suburbs around Newton
	Paradise
Campbelltown	Newton	Athelstone
Hectorville	Rostrevor

Newton is a suburb of Adelaide, South Australia, situated in the Adelaide foothills northeast of the city centre. The area features a significant population of people of Italian origin. Part of the City of Campbelltown, Newton is surrounded by the suburbs Paradise, Rostrevor, Athelstone and Campbelltown.

Newton is home to two public schools, Thorndon Park Primary School and Charles Campbell College, and the private St Francis of Assisi School. The area is also home to chain supermarkets and small shops, most notably Newton Village. The Catholic parish church, dedicated to St Francis of Assisi, was served by a community of Capuchin friars from the 1950's until January 2024.
