= Paradise, South Australia =

Paradise
- Suburb
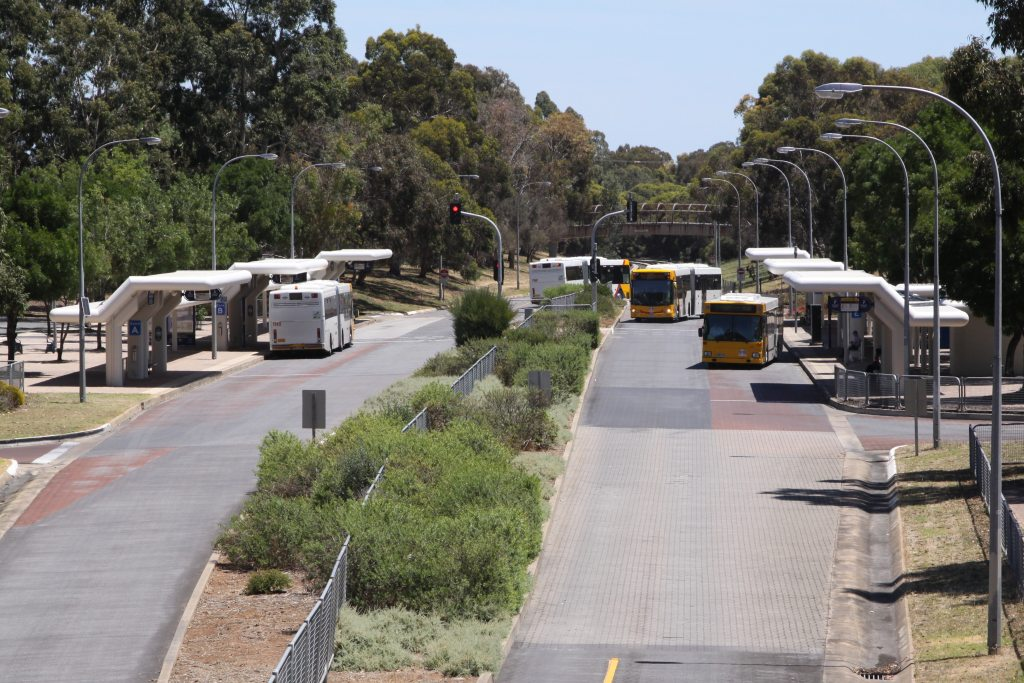

- Country: Australia
- State: South Australia
- City: Adelaide
- LGA: City of Campbelltown
- Established: 1850

Government
  - State electorate: Hartley
  - Federal division: Sturt

Population
  - Total: 7,217 (SAL 2021)
- Postcode: 5075
Suburbs around Paradise
Gilles Plains	Dernancourt	Highbury
Windsor Gardens	Paradise	Athelstone
Newton	Campbelltown	Felixstow

Paradise is a northeastern suburb of Adelaide in South Australia. It is bounded on the north side by the River Torrens. Amongst its neighbouring suburbs are Highbury, Dernancourt, Athelstone, Newton and Campbelltown.

Paradise is in the City of Campbelltown local government area. It was split across the South Australian House of Assembly electoral districts of Morialta (south-east part) and Hartley (north and west parts of Paradise) but has since all been incorporated into Hartley, and is in the Australian House of Representatives Division of Sturt.

== History ==
=== Toponymy ===
The suburb, originally "Shepley", was named "Paradise" by Joseph Ind, who had a Balmoral orange orchard on the banks of the nearby Torrens River. The name was derived from his "Paradise Bridge Hotel," named after a property called Paradise near his native Tetbury in Gloucestershire, England. He started the hotel in the front room of a cottage which he built in the nearby village of Paradise, which he established on land he gave to the community. The Ind Orchards were so productive and of such quality that the area was claimed to "truly be a paradise" for fruit.

=== Establishment ===
The Ind family settled the area, and built three significant properties of which only one remains in its original form. The first being Balmoral House which was built from the "cellar up" with the original immigrant Joseph Ind, who arrived in 1837, moving his family into it once the cellar was complete and the ground floor was being built. Balmoral Road was named after the property, being opposite its entrance on the Lower North East Road. The property is now a retirement village, 'Balmoral Village,' which Christopher Ind developed in a joint venture after buying out his brothers Jonathon and Andrew. At the time Balmoral House was in completely original and excellent condition, having eight open fireplaces, and containing original furnishings from its early days. It featured original horse stables with cedar mangers, and loft, a croquet lawn, a tennis court, and rare trees which had been brought from around the world. The family names are still found in the street names in the area, namely Christopher Street, and Ind Court. Some of the agricultural implements, and draft horses' harness from Balmoral, are on permanent display at the St. Martin's heritage cemetery on Gorge Road, near the corner of Lower North East Road, Campbelltown. There is a historic grave of Frederick Ind in the cemetery as well as a more recent family grave.

Other members of the Ind family also came across from England in the mid-1800s and added two more homes of significance to the area. The first being 'Valencia' now the main building of the retirement village opposite the Paradise Hotel on Lower North East Rd. The final and currently still original Ind residence 'Lyndhurst' can be found in Urban Avenue, Paradise. Its tessellated tile chimneys can be seen from Lower North East Road. There are many minor dwellings also found on Lower North East Road and in the vicinity of Balmoral House that were built as shearers quarters.

A post office was opened at Paradise on 1 June 1877.

== Geography ==
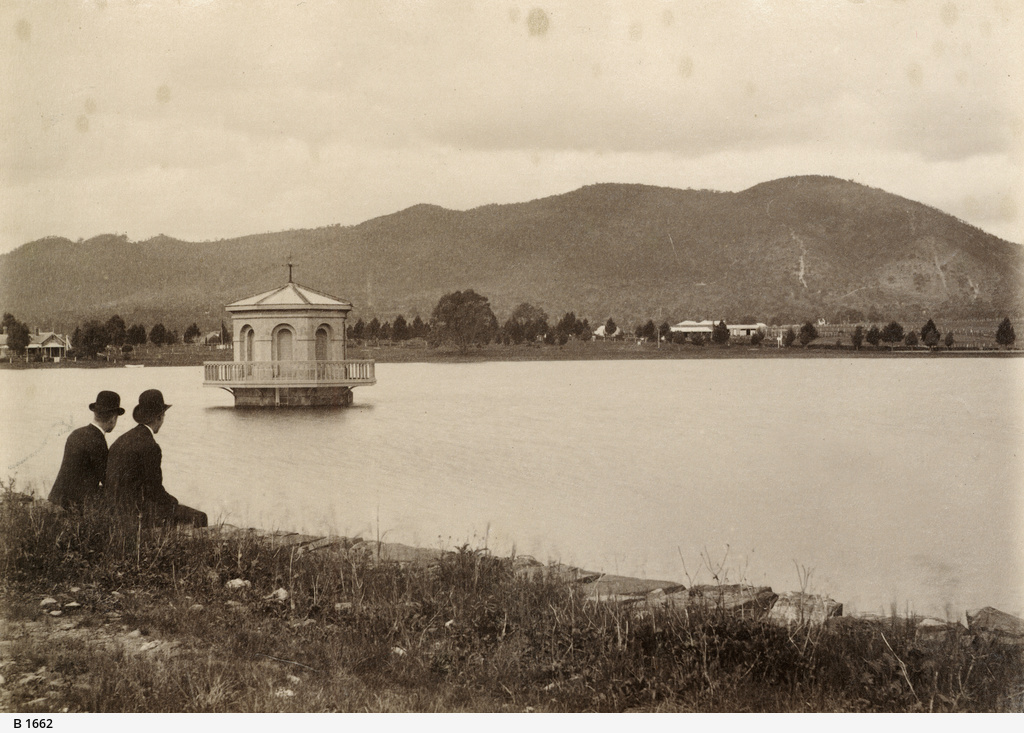
Thorndon Park Reservoir in 1899

The topography of Paradise is mostly flat, with the river Torrens acting as the northern boundary.

The site was the location of many market gardens during the 20th century and some of these still remain, as can be seen by contemporary satellite imagery. Housing now occupies much of the suburb.

The suburb contains the Thorndon Park Reserve, formerly the site of Thorndon Park Reservoir, built in 1860 and the first reservoir in Adelaide's Metropolitan water supply. The reservoir was supplied by the River Torrens via an aqueduct.

== Education ==
Paradise has an early learning child care centre, three primary schools and a high school.

The Paradise Primary School is a Reception to Year 7 school, which opened in 1978.

Sunrise Christian School is a Reception to Year 7 school, which opened in 1989.

The Campbelltown Primary School amalgamated with the Charles Campbell Secondary School in 2012 to form the Charles Campbell College. The college has in excess of 1100 students, from Reception to Year 12, and is divided into three sub-schools: Junior School (Reception to Year 6), Middle School (Years 7-9) and Senior School (Years 10-12).

== Transportation ==
Transport within Paradise consists mainly of two-way suburban streets. The main arterial roads going through the suburb include Gorge Road, Lower North East Road and Darley Road. The tram network had termini in Henley Beach, Hindmarsh, Prospect, Nailsworth, Paradise, Magill, Burnside, Glen Osmond, Mitcham, Clarence Park, Hyde Park and Walkerville.

Public transport consists of a bus service run by Adelaide Metro. Routes include 174, 176, 178, 579, H20, H30 and 106

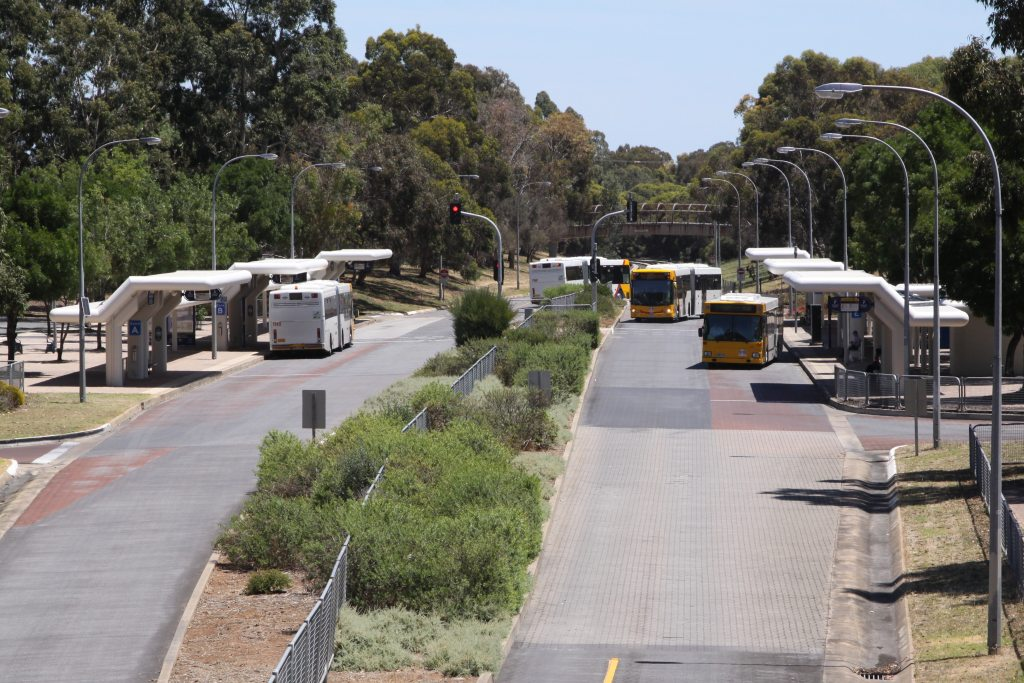
Paradise interchange in Paradise.

The O-Bahn Busway has a major interchange within the suburb ( built in the 1980s ).

Paradise was served by a Municipal Tramways Trust tram line. It ceased to operate in 1958 along with almost every other tram line in Adelaide.

== Notable people ==
Charles James Fox Campbell. Grazier and early settler of Adelaide, South Australia, whose name is commemorated in the Adelaide suburb of Campbelltown, South Australia and the municipality, the City of Campbelltown, South Australia.
