= 2011 Hectorville siege =

Event in Adelaide, South Australia

- Location: 34.8890°S 138.6687°E; Hectorville, South Australia, Australia
- Date: 29 April 2011 c. 2:30 a.m. – 10:00 a.m. UTC+9:30
- Attack type: siege
- Weapon: Shotgun
- Deaths: 3
- Injuries: 3 (including 2 police officers)

The 2011 Hectorville siege took place between the hours of 2:30 a.m. and 10:30 a.m. on Friday, 29 April 2011, at the small suburb of Hectorville, east of Adelaide in the state of South Australia, Australia. It began after a 39-year-old resident of the suburb, later identified as Donato Anthony Corbo, entered his neighbors' property and shot four people, killing three and severely wounding one.

An eight-hour stand-off with police followed, during which time he shot and wounded two officers. The stand-off culminated in his arrest by members of the Special Tasks and Rescue unit of South Australia Police.

== Events ==
The incident started at approximately 2:30 a.m. when Corbo entered his neighbor's property at 112 Montacute Road, Hectorville, and shot dead the 64-year-old man, then his 65-year-old wife and their 41-year-old son-in-law. A female who was also in the house at the time rang police and fled with her 14-year-old son and his 11-year-old friend. The son was seriously wounded when Corbo shot him as he tried to flee the house.

A South Australia Police patrol were the first officers on the scene. When the officers approached the house, Corbo opened fire with a shotgun. One officer was seriously wounded when he was shot in the face and another officer was wounded in the knee, but was able to return fire and drag himself and his wounded colleague to safety. Both officers were taken to Royal Adelaide Hospital for treatment and survived. Corbo then fled next door, back to his property, where he engaged in a tense siege with heavily armed members of the STAR force. After an eight-hour-long siege, police entered the property and arrested Corbo without further casualties.

=== Victims ===
The victims were South African immigrants who arrived in Australia three years before the shooting from Pretoria, in the hope of a better life for their son as they felt that South Africa was a violent place to bring a child up. The two deceased victims were on holiday visiting the family, and were due to return home to South Africa two days after the shooting took place. The family were deeply religious, members of the local Seventh-day Adventist Church.

== Suspect ==
The suspect arrested was announced as being 39-year-old Donato Anthony Corbo, born 1971, and who had previous dealings with the police. It is suggested that the reason for the killings may have sparked from an earlier row between the two families over Corbo's pet dog, a Staffordshire Terrier, which had recently been poisoned. It is also speculated that Corbo was suffering from mental health issues, stemming from a relationship breakup in December 2010.

The weapon used during the shootings was a shotgun, a Class-A category firearm. It is not known if Corbo has a legitimate license for the weapon, more likely not, as police later removed three additional firearms from the property belonging to his father. The shotgun was also owned by his father, Giuseppe Corbo. Police tried to blame Corbo's father for leaving keys accessible to the firearms safe, but they were not able to pin any wrongdoing on Giuseppe Corbo, as he complied with storage requirements

== Aftermath ==
Corbo was later charged with three counts of murder, two counts of attempted murder, and a string of other offences, and if convicted, he would face an automatic penalty of three consecutive sentences of life imprisonment. He was refused bail and scheduled to appear in court on 2 May.

A day after the shootings occurred, the police officer who was seriously wounded after being shot in the face was in a serious but stable condition, under an induced coma at the Royal Adelaide Hospital. The 14-year-old boy who suffered gunshot wounds was in a similar condition.

Corbo appeared in Adelaide Magistrates Court on 2 May, charged with three counts of murder and two counts of attempted murder. He pleaded not guilty to the charges. He was scheduled to reappear in court on 26 July.

On 17 May 2012, Justice Michael David found Corbo not guilty due to mental incompetence of the murders of Luc Mombers, 41, and his parents-in-law Kobus, 64, and Annetjie Snyman, 65; the attempted murders of Mr Mombers' 14-year-old son Marcel and a police officer; and threatening a second police officer with a firearm. Corbo was automatically sentenced to three consecutive sentences of detention in hospital for life.

== See also ==
- Timeline of major crimes in Australia
- Crime in Australia
- Crime in South Australia
