= Rostrevor, South Australia =

Rostrevor
- Suburb
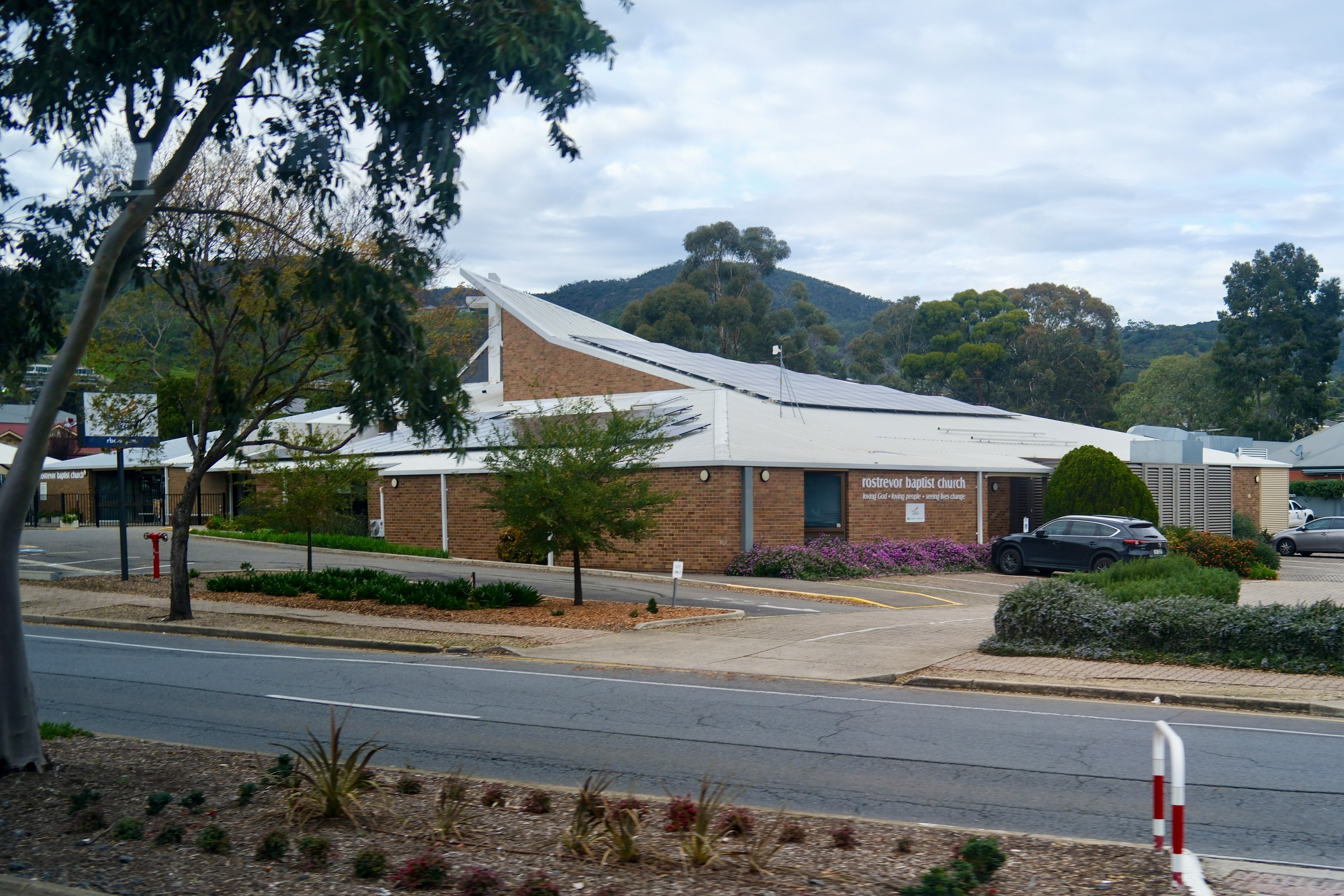
- Rostrevor Baptist Church

- Coordinates: 34°53′32″S 138°41′24″E
- Country: Australia
- State: South Australia
- City: Adelaide
- LGAs: City of Campbelltown; Adelaide Hills Council
- Location: 11 km (6.8 mi) ENE of Adelaide city centre

Government
  - State electorate: Morialta
  - Federal division: Sturt

Population
  - Total: 8,452 (SAL 2021)
- Postcode: 5073
Suburbs around Rostrevor
Campbelltown	Newton	Athelstone
Hectorville	Rostrevor	Montacute
Magill		Woodforde

Rostrevor is a suburb of Adelaide within the City of Campbelltown and the Adelaide Hills Council. It is located about 10 kilometres east-north-east of the Adelaide city centre. Rostrevor has a creek running through the middle of it, called Fourth Creek, which runs into the River Torrens.

Rostrevor is in the State House of Assembly Electoral district of Morialta and is in the Federal Division of Sturt.

It was named after the village of Rostrevor in Northern Ireland.

Some of the facilities in Rostrevor include Stradbroke School, Foodland, Rostrevor Baptist Church, and a nature playground in Morialta Conservation Park. A new school, the Morialta Secondary College, opened in 2023 in Rostrevor, built on the former Norwood Morialta High School's Middle Campus site.

== Boundary Changes ==
Campbelltown City Council has an active boundary change proposal in place to incorporate the Adelaide Hills Council part of Rostrevor along with part of neighbouring Woodforde into its boundaries. This is despite an overwhelming 65% majority of residents and ratepayers opposing it in a survey conducted in 2019.
