= St Joseph's School, Hectorville =

Coordinates: 34°53′24″S 138°39′36″E

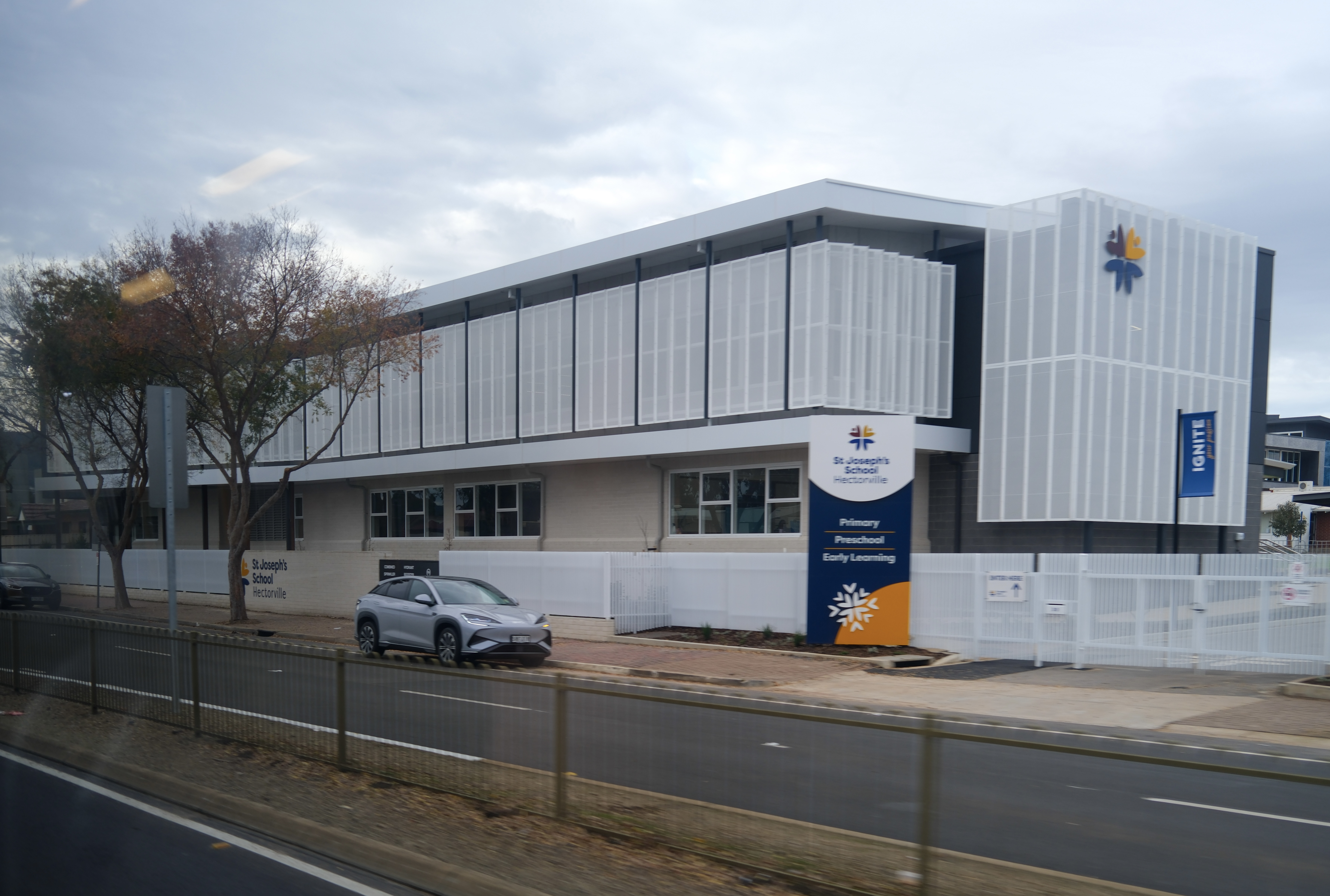
St Joseph's School in 2026

St Joseph's School, Hectorville is a Roman Catholic primary school in the Australian state of South Australia located in the suburb of Hectorville, Adelaide, founded in 1863, and conducted by the Sisters of St Joseph of the Sacred Heart.
