= Campbelltown, South Australia =

Campbelltown
- Suburb
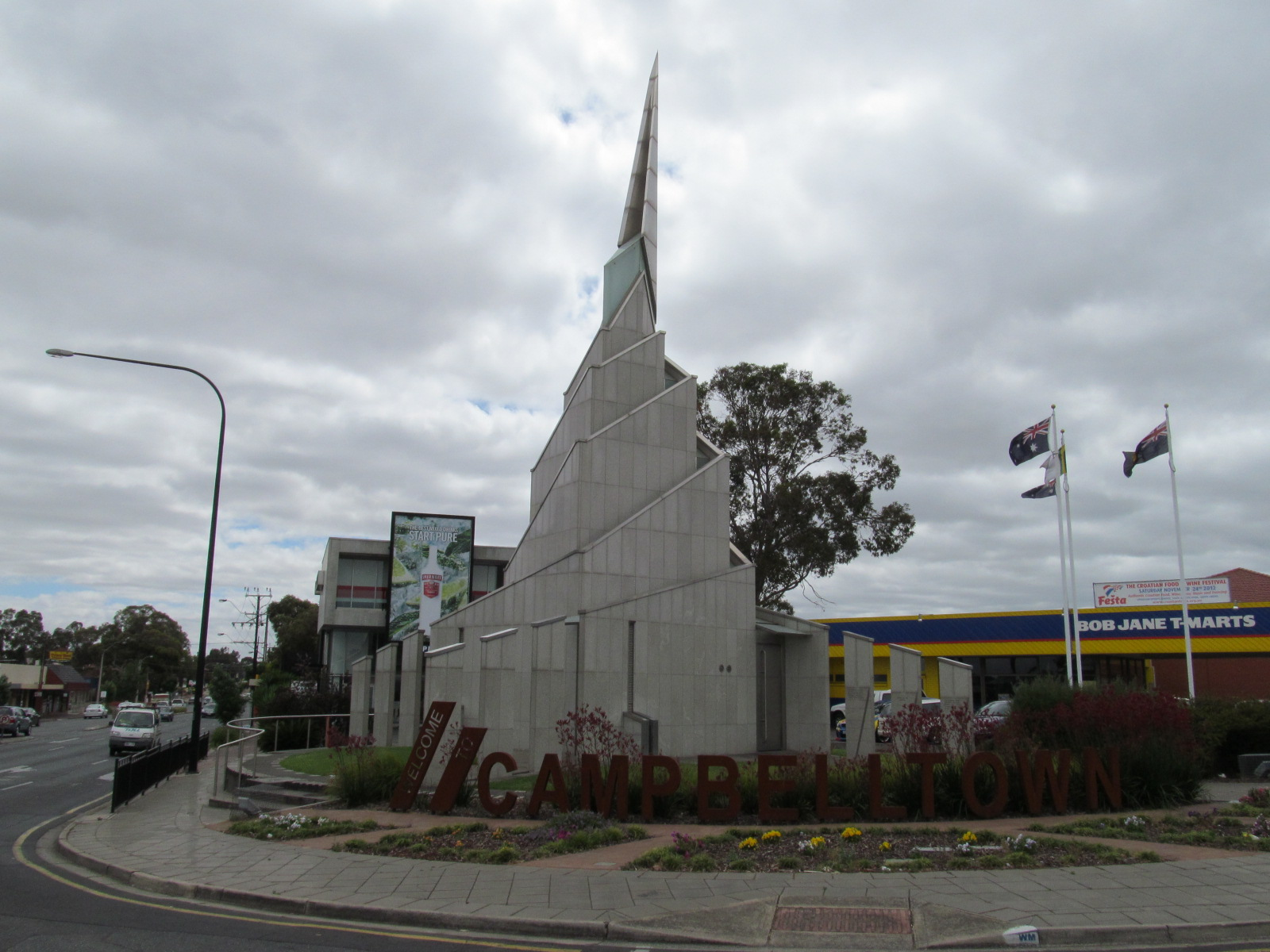
- Entrance statement and immigration memorial

- Coordinates: 34°52′41″S 138°39′47″E
- Country: Australia
- State: South Australia
- City: Adelaide
- LGA: City of Campbelltown
- Location: 8.7 km (5.4 mi) NE of Adelaide city centre
- Established: 1851

Government
  - State electorate: Hartley
  - Federal division: Sturt

Population
  - Total: 9,263 (SAL 2021)
- Postcode: 5074
Suburbs around Campbelltown
| Windsor Gardens | Paradise |
| Klemzig | Campbelltown | Newton |
| Felixstow | Glynde, Hectorville | Rostrevor |

Campbelltown is a north-eastern suburb of Adelaide, South Australia. The population of the area was 7,003 in 2006. It is bordered in the north-west by the River Torrens, a river that is surrounded by parks and smaller creeks. Campbelltown is 8.7 km north-east of Adelaide. Lower North East Road crosses the middle of the suburb.

Campbelltown is named after Charles James Fox Campbell, a pioneer settler in that locality, and is part of the City of Campbelltown. The original home of Charles Campbell is named Lochend and is located near the River Torrens on Lochend Drive. The building underwent restoration in 2004.

Campbelltown Post Office opened on 1 January 1855. The Postal Code of the area is 5074.

The area is represented federally by Claire Clutterham and by Jenn Roberts in the state parliament; both were elected under the Labor banner. The suburb has one school, East Marden Primary School. Campbelltown is home to many parks, playgrounds and outdoor sport courts. Campbelltown also has an Aquatic and Recreation Centre with swim, fitness and sport facilities.
