= Charles Campbell College =

Coordinates: 34°52′S 138°40′E

- Adelaide, South Australia; Australia

Information
- Type: Co-educational public high school
- Established: 1992
- Principal: Kevin O’Neil
- Grades: R–13
- Enrolment: 1175
- Campus: Urban; Campbell Road, Paradise
- Colours: Blue, red, white
- Accreditation: CIS, ECIS
- Website: www.ccc.sa.edu.au/

Charles Campbell College is divided into three sub-schools which cater for the specific learning needs of each cohort:

- Junior School (Reception to Year 6)
- Middle School (Years 7 to 9)
- Senior School (Years 10 to 12)

The Senior School is a Special Interest High School of over 1100 students ranging from Years 7 to 13, and admits adults through a re-entry programme. It is located in the Eastern suburbs of Adelaide, the capital city of the state of South Australia in Australia.

Charles Campbell College has a specialist sport programme for football, The Australian Football Academy. The ARFA is sponsored by the likes of the Newton Jaguars Netball Club and the Norwood Football Club.

There are a large number of extra-curricular activities which support students to succeed in high achieving academics as well as chosen electives. Charles Campbell College has regularly participated in numerous competitions and events that are held locally and nationally; allowing students opportunities for success and achievement.

The school amalgamated with the Campbelltown Primary School in 2012 to form the Charles Campbell College.
