= Montacute Conservation Park =

Protected area in South Australia

- IUCN category III (natural monument or feature)
- Location within South Australia
- Location: South Australia
- Nearest city: Adelaide city centre
- Coordinates: 34°52′58.08″S 138°47′16.08″E
- Area: 194 ha (480 acres)
- Established: 1 January 1971
- Governing body: Department for Environment and Water
- Website: Official website

Montacute Conservation Park is a protected area located in South Australia about 17 kilometres (11 miles) north-east of the Adelaide city centre. The conservation park is classified as an IUCN Category III protected area.
