= Hectorville, South Australia =

Hectorville
- Suburb
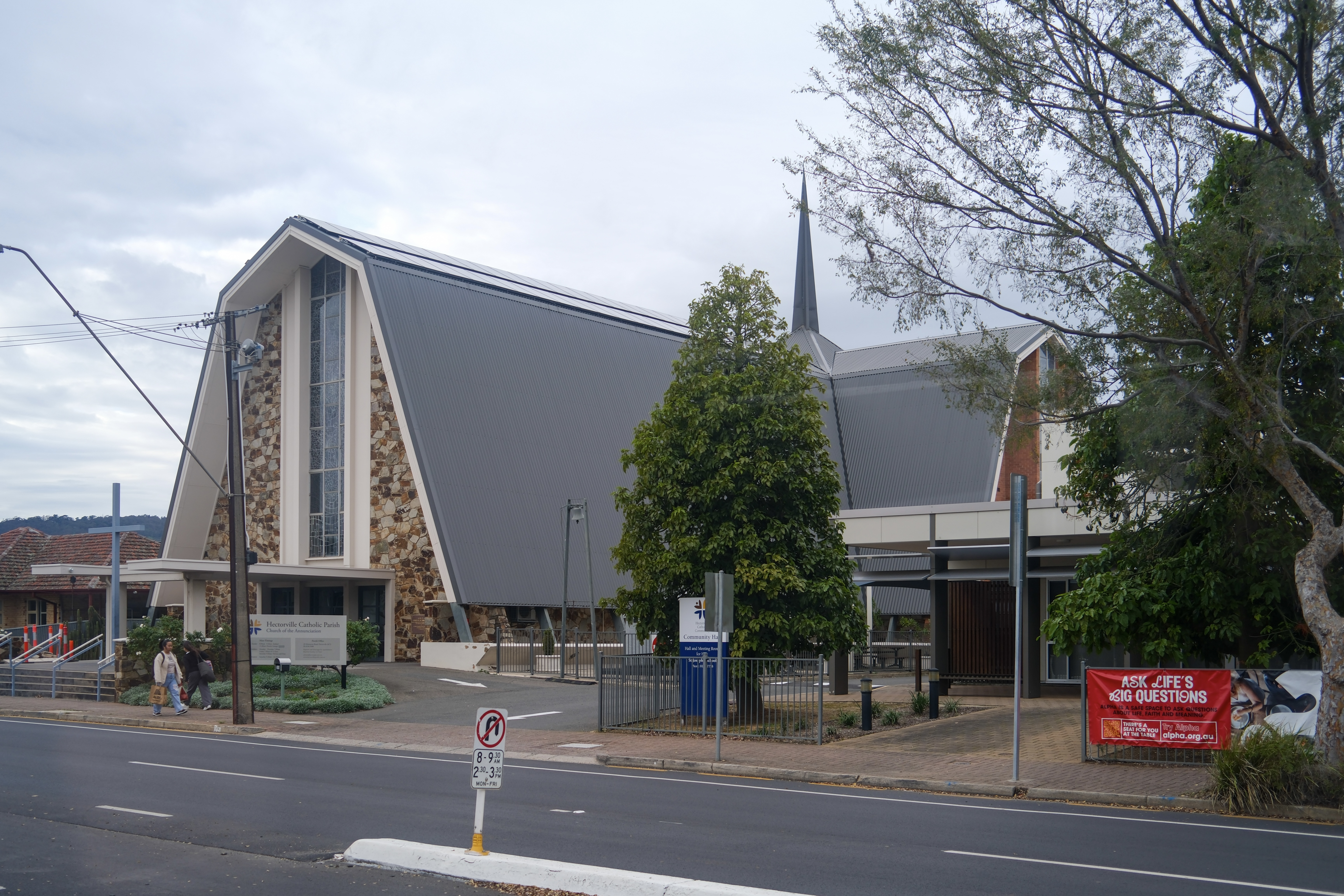
- Hectorville Catholic Church

- Country: Australia
- State: South Australia
- City: Adelaide
- LGA: City of Campbelltown
- Established: 1855

Population
  - Total: 4,241 (SAL 2021)
- Postcode: 5073
Suburbs around Hectorville
Glynde	Campbelltown	Newton
Payneham	Hectorville	Rostrevor
Firle	Tranmere	Magill

Hectorville is a small suburb of Adelaide in the City of Campbelltown, one of eight suburbs within the city. The public primary school, East Torrens Primary and Catholic primary school, St Joseph's School, Hectorville, is located within the suburb.

== History ==
The suburb was laid out by P. B. Coglin in 1855 on land he owned, and named for John Hector (c. 1788 – 31 July 1863), accountant of the Savings Bank of South Australia.

The first house in Hectorville was built by Price Maurice in 1849 next to Fourth Creek. The land was sold and became a suburb in 1855.

Hectorville's original Catholic parish church was built in 1863. It is dedicated to the Annunciation.

Thomas Binns Robson purchased 20 acres (8.1 ha) of land at Hectorville, naming it "Ellythorp" and established extensive orchards and vineyards for fresh and dried fruit production.

On 29 April 2011, Hectorville was the scene of the 2011 Hectorville siege, in which a gunman shot dead three members of a family, as well as wounding two police officers, one critically.

== Notable people ==
- Australian singer/songwriter Greg Champion grew up in Hectorville, after moving from Benalla.
