= City of Campbelltown (South Australia) =

Coordinates: 34.88137°S 138.66085°E

- Local government area
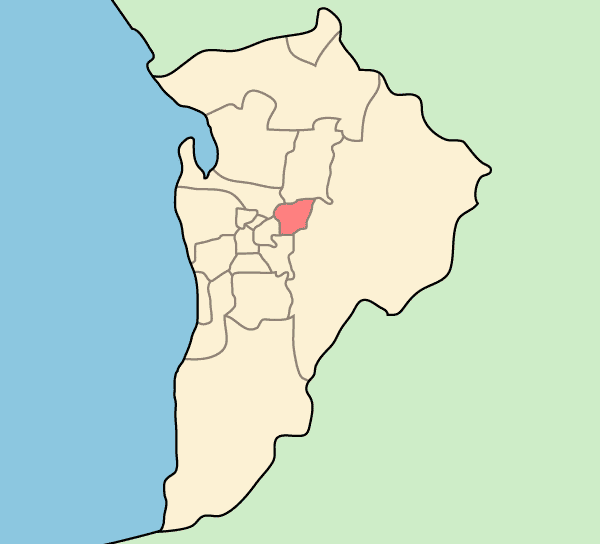

- Interactive map of City of Campbelltown
- Country: Australia
- State: South Australia
- Region: Eastern Adelaide
- Council seat: Rostrevor

Government
  - Mayor: Jill Whittaker OAM
  - State electorate: Morialta, Hartley
  - Federal division: Mayo, Sturt

Area
  - Total: 24.35 km^{2} (9.40 sq mi)

Population
  - Total: 54,800 (LGA 2021)
  - Density: 2,250.51/km^{2} (5,828.8/sq mi)
- Website: City of Campbelltown
LGAs around City of Campbelltown
Port Adelaide Enfield	Tea Tree Gully	Tea Tree Gully
Norwood Payneham St Peters	City of Campbelltown	Adelaide Hills
Norwood Payneham St Peters	Burnside	Burnside

The City of Campbelltown is a local government area in the inner eastern suburbs of Adelaide, South Australia about 6 kilometres from the Adelaide GPO. The city is bordered by the River Torrens and the City of Tea Tree Gully, the District of Adelaide Hills, the City of Burnside, the City of Norwood Payneham St Peters, and the City of Port Adelaide Enfield.

== History ==
The first District Council of Payneham in South Australia was formed in 1854 when the year-old District Council of East Torrens was split, for more effective governance, into three separate local governing bodies, including the original East Torrens council and the District Council of Burnside. In 1867 the new District Council of Stepney was detached from Payneham council to better represent the more urban interests of the western wards. In the following year, on 27 February 1868, Payneham was renamed the District Council of Campbelltown. The name "Campbelltown" had been decided upon at a meeting held at the Glynde Inn on 9 December 1867 and was named after Charles James Fox Campbell. The Stepney council was later renamed in the 1930s to the District Council of Payneham, making it the second council of that name.

On 1 January 1946, the Campbelltown District Council became a town with its own municipal office and, on 6 May 1960, it was proclaimed a city.

=== Lochend ===
Campbell purchased Sections 309 and 310 on a fertile plain near the River Torrens in 1842 and built a home he called "Lochend" after the ancestral home of his family in Scotland. Lochend was designed by George Strickland Kingston, and built of local river stone. It included a stucco porch, hall and living room with a moulded ceiling. Campbell later substantially expanded Lochend by the addition of three bedrooms and a cellar. Lochend included 4 acres (1.6 ha) of garden and 156 acres (63 ha) in the estate, primarily used as pastoral land. In 1849 he subdivided 16 acres (6.5 ha) into 40 gardening blocks under the name "Campbelltown".

In 1852, Campbell leased the house to James Scott. By this time, the house had six rooms. Campbell sold Lochend to Scott in 1858 for 2,600 pounds, and Scott lived there until 1875. The Scott family enlarged the house to eleven rooms, a stable, coach house and cottage, all surrounded by vegetable and fruit gardens and 58 acres of crop growing land. The next owner, retired sheep farmer David Mundy, built the two-storey house Lochiel Park, on a rise just to the south of Lochend. From 1898 to 1957, Lochend and Lochiel Park were owned or lived in by members of the Hobbs family. The Hobbs sold both houses to the South Australian Government in 1947, and Lochiel Park became a junior boys' reformatory.

In the early 1980s, ownership of Lochend was transferred to Campbelltown Council. Empty, partly demolished and isolated, Lochend had deteriorated, was in a dangerous condition, and was in almost irretrievable condition. In 1998 Campbelltown Council began efforts to save the building; it was faithfully restored to near original condition with the guidance of the Campbelltown Historical Society, and was officially reopened on 29 February 2004.

Lochend, also known as Lochend House, is now situated within Lochiel Park. It is a listed building, as a place of state heritage significance as well as being on the Register of the National Estate. It is owned in trust by the City of Campbelltown, and open to the public for two hours on the first Sunday of every alternate month.

=== Lochiel Park ===
Lochiel Park, also known as Lochiel Park Green Village, is a mixed urban development covering 15 ha (37 acres). In 2002 the South Australian Government under Premier Mike Rann announced the development of an ecovillage on the site of the Lochiel Park junior boys' reformatory/ TAFE college. It was originally intended to build normal suburban housing on the 15 ha (37-acre) site, but Renewal SA proposed an alternative plan, which involved building medium-density housing on only a third of the site. The remaining area was to become public parkland, incorporating and urban forest and wetlands to process the stormwater. The new development was planned to cover an area bounded by the River Torrens (west), Lochend House, grounds and entry road (north), Hobbs House (east), the O-Bahn (south-east), and a wetland (south). Announcing the development in 2002, Premier Mike Rann said: "I want South Australia to become a world leader in a new green approach to the way we all live. The Lochiel Park Development will become the national model 'Green Village' incorporating ecological sustainable development technologies".

The development began under Renewal SA in 2004; by 2018 there were 106 dwellings at Lochiel Park; and by 2022, 150 residents. All houses have a minimum 7.5-star NatHERS (Nationwide House Energy Rating Scheme) rating, and built with extremely strict energy and water efficiency specifications. It has been described as a "nation-leading 'green village'".

The Lochiel Park Community Garden was established in June 2010, after an inaugural meeting of residents in June 2008, and the first produce was picked in December 2010.

In 2013, South Australia's first zero carbon home was completed at Lochiel Park, built by TS4 Living, whose design won a competition to build a sustainable conventional three-bedroomed home for the same cost as a conventional home. The home was delivered within 16 weeks, at a cost of around A$335,000 (excluding GST), with a 7.5 star rating. After completion of the development, Renewal SA handed over responsibility for the maintenance of the urban forest, wetlands and reserves to the council and SA Water.

In 2019, the village won an international Green Flag Award, the first in SA, and one of only 10 won by Australian sites thus far.

== Council ==
Council consists of 11 Elected Members comprising a Mayor, and 10 Ward Councillors. The Council area is divided into five wards, with two Councillors elected from each ward.

The current council as of December 2022 is:

Ward	Party Affiliation	Councillor	First elected	Notes
Mayor	Independent	Jill Whittaker OAM		
Gorge	Independent	Dom Barbaro		
Gorge	Independent	Johanna McLuskey		
Hectorville	Independent	Luci Blackborough		
Hectorville	Labor	Yassir Ajrish		
Newton	Independent	Claude Scalzi		
Newton	Independent	Anna Leombruno		
River	Independent	Jagdish Harish Lakhani		
River	Independent	Matthew Noble		
Woodforde	Liberal	Therese Britton-La Salle		
Woodforde	Independent	John Flynn		Deputy Mayor

== Council Chairmen/Mayors of Campbelltown ==
Council Chairmen/Mayors since 1868 have been as follows:

Years	Chairmen
1868-1868	Alfred Walters
1868-1872	George Hill
1872-1873	John Miller
1873-1875	James Niall
1875-1876	Henry Hersey
1876-1881	George Hill
1881-1885	James Taylor Holmes
1885-1886	Edwin Samuel Gillard Nation
1886-1888	John Mines
1888-1891	George Frederick Ind
1891-1892	Arthur Geach Martin
1892-1893	Nicholas McShane, senior
1893-1896	Peter Addison
1896-1898	Arthur Geach Martin
1898-1900	Nicholas McShane, senior
1900-1902	William James Uffindell
1902-1906	Peter Addison
1906-1907	Nicholas McShane, junior
1907-1909	Thomas Brooks
1909-1910	David Virgo
1910-1916	Thomas Brooks
1916-1917	Samuel Pitt
1917-1918	Nicholas McShane, junior
1918-1921	Michael Joseph Daly
1921-1922	James Hockley
1922-1924	William Donald Cosgrove
1924-1925	Michael Joseph Daly
1925-1926	William Donald Cosgrove
1926-1930	Michael Joseph Daly
1930-1932	William Henry Stratton
1932-1937	Michael Joseph Daly
1937-1938	Samuel Wagstaff Mozley
1938-1945	William George Amos
1945-1946	Joseph Henry Heading

Years	Mayor
1946-1948	Michael Joseph Daly
1948-1952	Ronald William Morris Johnson
1952-1954	Owen Herbert Atkinson
1954-1960	Ronald William Morris Johnson
1960-1968	Edward Royal (Roy) Wadmore
1968-1971	Geoffrey Albert Heath
1971-1973	Neville John Trewren
1973-1980	Herbert (Herb) Samuel Reid
1980-1982	Geoffrey Albert Heath
1982-1991	Laurence Maxwell (Max) Amber
1991-2006	Stephen (Steve) John Woodcock
2006-2018	Simon Brewer
2018-	Jill Whittaker OAM

== Sister and Friendship Cities ==
The City of Campbelltown has two Sister Cities/Friendship Cities:

- Paduli, Italy
- Oyster Bay, United States of America

== Suburbs ==
- Athelstone (5076)
- Campbelltown (5074)
- Hectorville (5073)
- Magill (5072)
- Newton (5074)
- Paradise (5075)
- Rostrevor (5073)
- Tranmere (5073)

== See also ==
- List of Adelaide parks and gardens
