= Athelstone, South Australia =

Athelstone
- Suburb
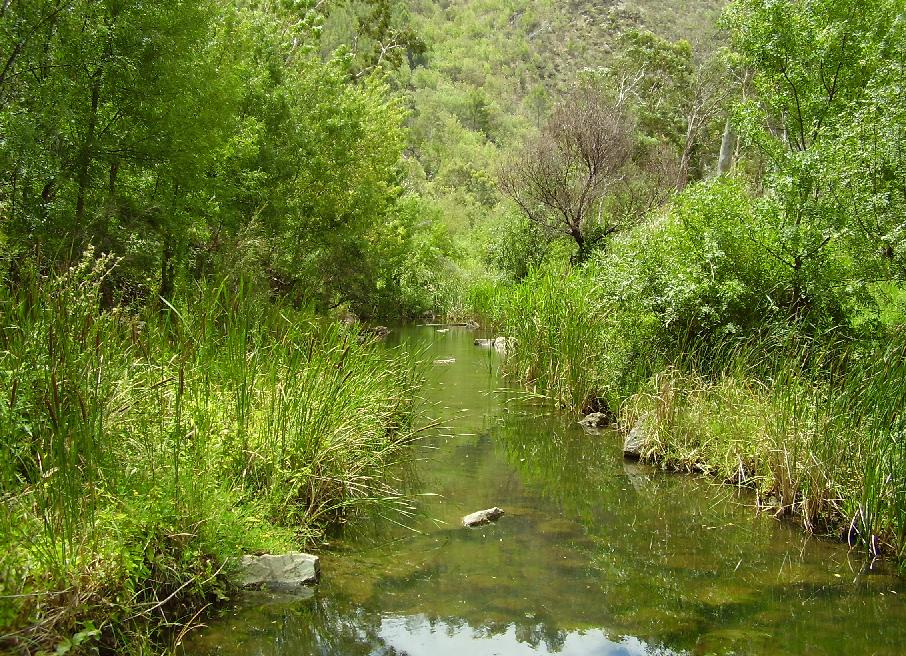
- River Torrens located at Athelstone

- Country: Australia
- State: South Australia
- City: Adelaide
- LGA: City of Campbelltown
- Established: 1852

Population
  - Total: 9,601 (SAL 2021)
- Postcode: 5076

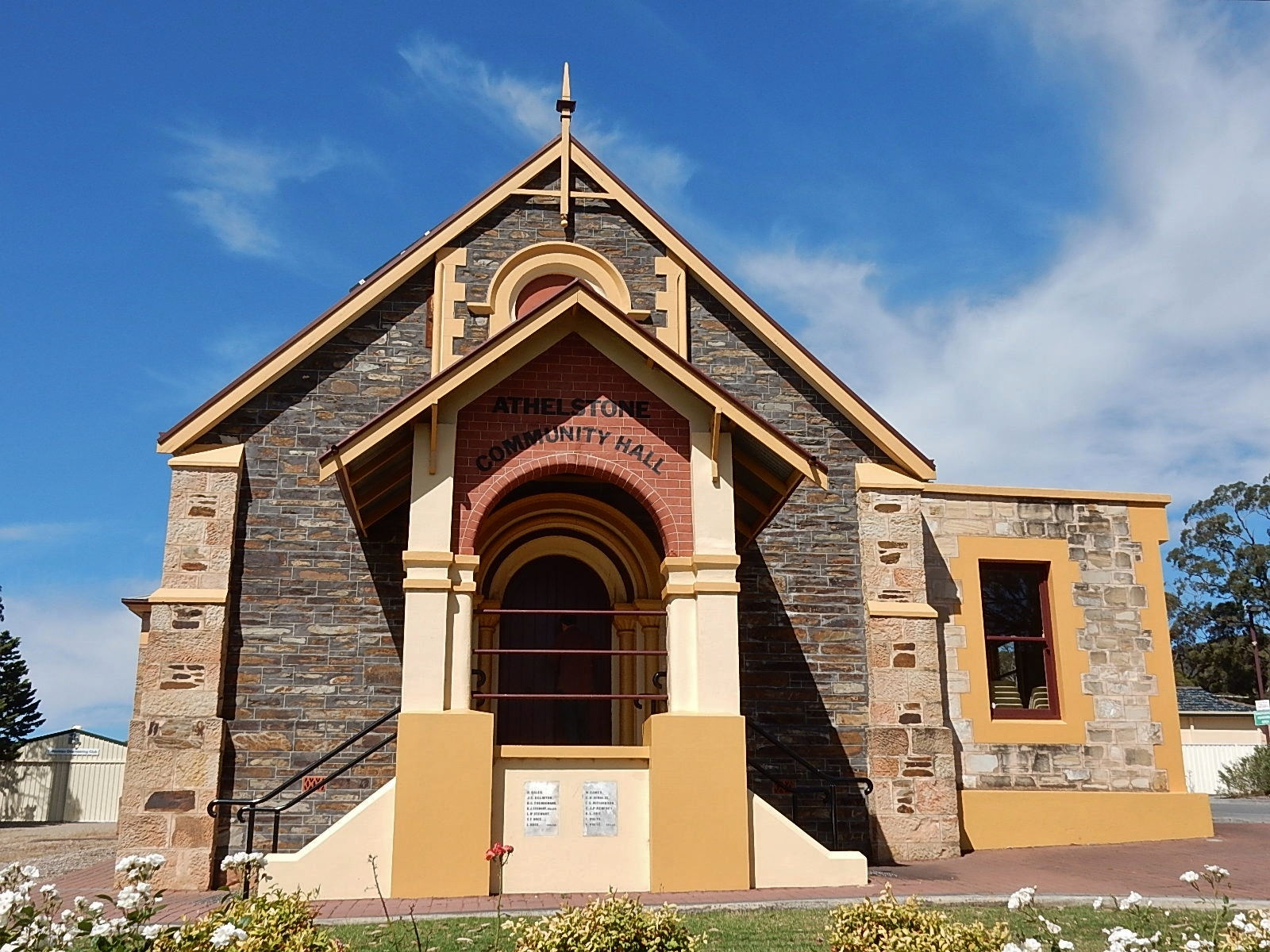
Athelstone Community Hall

Athelstone /ˈæθəlstən/ is a suburb of Adelaide in the City of Campbelltown. It was established in the 19th century but only became part of suburban Adelaide in the second half of the 20th century.

It is approximately 10 km northeast of Adelaide's central business district. The main arterial road, Gorge Road, runs through this suburb in a west–east direction. The River Torrens, one of Adelaide's major water supplies, borders the suburb. This water source runs its way from Mount Pleasant to the sea. Gorge Road leads up into the Adelaide Hills, joining the gorge of the Kangaroo Creek Dam, and the Torrens' source. Fifth Creek (a tributary to the River Torrens) also runs through the suburb as an intermittent stream, prone to flooding in late Spring (October–December).

Athelstone is bounded by the River Torrens, Black Hill Conservation Park, Montacute Road, Stradbroke Road, Hamilton Terrace, Schulze Road and River Drive. It is known as the last eastern suburb or the leafy suburb.

== History ==
The first Europeans known to have visited Athelstone were the explorers John Hill and Dr George Imlay. They camped overnight beside the Torrens on 23 January 1838, en route to the Murray River.

Due to the high fertility of the alluvial river soils, the district was soon being farmed by incoming European migrants. Athelstone's name comes from Athelstone house and mill, built by Charles Dinham circa 1843 to 1845. John Coulls from Helston in Cornwall bought the mill in 1855, converting it for grape crushing.

The suburb (lower Athelstone) began as a village along the River Torrens. The shopping centre or village centre began from these settlements. Athelstone Post Office opened on 19 March 1863. The Addison and Ryan families held possession of land sold to the Jesuits in the 1960s to build Saint Ignatius' College senior campus around the Upper Athelstone site. Smaller subdivisions have been created. For example, Foxfield Estate in the east, was a development of the Hickinbotham Group during the late 1970s. Other subdevelopments have also occurred.

Land has also been preserved in the process. Wadmore Park, adjoining Athelstone Oval and Black Hill Conservation Park were established as recreational and nature reserves, in the mid 1900s. Black Hill Conservation Park was claimed in 1975, under the National Parks and Wildlife Act.

Market gardening was a big part of Athelstone's development. Families such as the Tunno family migrated from Italy in the 1950s and grew a variety of bunched vegetables on a small acreage for 30 years selling it to various retailers and wholesale markets throughout Adelaide. Much of the produce grown was European in origin such as endive, spinach, chicory, and fennel. As at 1 December 2014 only one market garden was left in Athelstone, located on Maryvale Road.

== Geography ==
Athelstone Recreation Reserve is a reserve in the suburb of Athelstone. Athelstone is home to Athelstone Football Club, one of the oldest football clubs in South Australia. It is also home to the Athelstone Soccer Club and Eastern United Soccer Club. It is the largest reserve in the suburb of Athelstone.

== Demography ==
The 2021 Australian Bureau of Statistics data indicates Athelstone's population to be predominantly middle class and totalling 9,601 people. There is an even spread of both genders. 57.1% of the population comprises married couples with a skew to the 35- to 74-year-old age range. 20.0% of Athelstone is over 65 years old.

69.9% of the population was born in Australia. 30.3% of the population speaks other languages, with 7.3% speaking Italian, 2.3% speaking Mandarin, and 1.8% speaking Greek. 44.2% of the people living in Athelstone have both parents born overseas.

Athelstone residents work primarily in the professional, clerical and administrative field, as technicians and trades workers, managers, community and personal services worker, and in sales: these roles comprise 87.9% of the population.

== Housing ==
The predominantly contemporary housing style is echoed throughout the suburb. There have been different stages in the suburb's development. Dwellings from the first half of the twentieth century housing still predominate in some sections of the suburb, with corrugated iron cladding or stone exteriors (mostly Californian bungalows).

The first contemporary housing was built in the area during the 1970s. Many of these styles have emerged as the area still has some market gardening holdings yet to be released as housing allotments. Some blocks have been subdivided for high density housing arrangements.
