= Angle Vale Bridge =

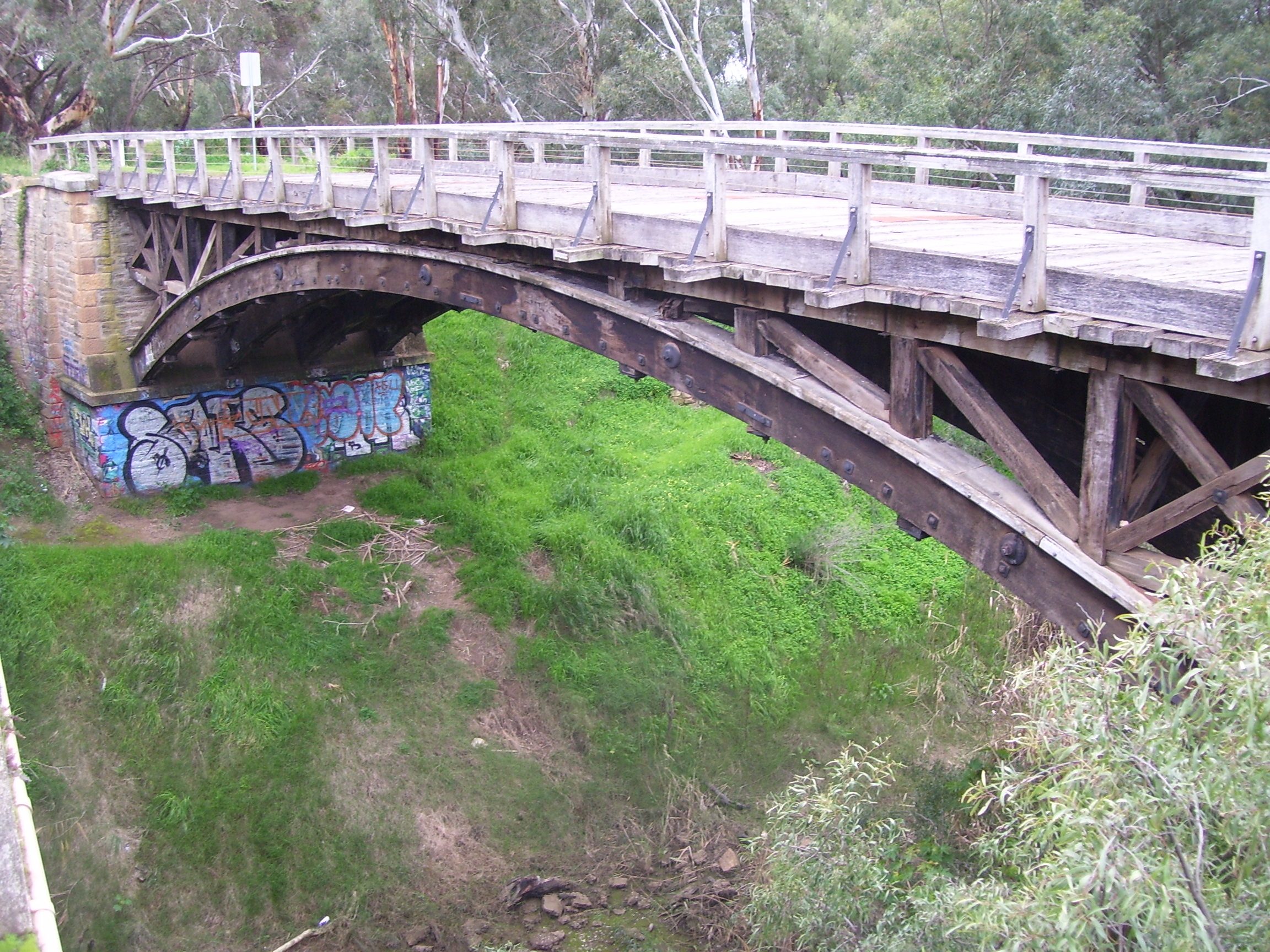
- Angle Vale Bridge
- Coordinates: 34°37′50″S 138°38′45″E
- Carried: Motor vehicles
- Crossed: Gawler River
- Locale: Heaslip Road, Angle Vale, South Australia, Australia

Characteristics
- Design: Deck arch bridge
- Material: Sandstone timber
- Width: 5 metres (18 ft)
- Longest span: 26 metres (85 ft)
- No. of spans: 1

History
- Designer: Charles Francis Godfrey Ashwin
- Construction end: 1876
- Collapsed: 25 May 2023
- Closed: 1966

South Australian Heritage Register
- Official name: Angle Vale Bridge [Laminated Timber Arch]; Old Bridge
- Type: REG - Confirmed
- Designated: 24 July 1980
- Reference no.: 13324
- Polygon type: B - Building footprint
- Subject index: Transport (Road) - Road Bridge

Angle Vale Bridge was a laminated timber deck arch bridge erected in 1876 over the Gawler River on Heaslip Road, Angle Vale, South Australia. It was the only surviving bridge of its type in Australia in 2023. The bridge was listed on the South Australian Heritage Register on 24 July 1980. The bridge collapsed on 25 May 2023 as a result of heavy rainfall.

== Description ==
The bridge consisted of sandstone abutments and wing walls, with four laminated timber arch ribs of 26 metres (85 ft) span, set in cast iron sockets and supporting a timber deck carrying a roadway 5 metres (18 ft) wide. The bridge was opened on Wednesday 22 November 1876 by Commissioner of Public Works Hon. J. Colton with Miss Heaslip taking the honour of cutting the ribbon.

== History ==
Laminated timber arch bridges were constructed in Australia on British and American designs from 1853. However, few survived due to the poor preservation of Australian timbers The first bridges of this type in South Australia were built in 1856 using both imported softwood and local hardwood and incorporated horizontally laminated bent timbers bolted at regular intervals. However the arches only had a service life of only 12 to 16 years due to water penetrating between the laminations causing the timber to quickly rot. An improvement was made by laminating the timbers vertically and capping the tops to prevent water ingress.

Tenders were called for erecting the Angle Vale Bridge on Wednesday 2 February 1876 closing on 21 February. The bridge was designed by Charles Francis Godfrey Ashwin C.E., Superintending Surveyor of the Northern District of the South Australia Central Road Board. the construction contract was won by Messrs Hack and Parker, while J.C. Brodie was the Clerk of Works. The bridge was completed in less than nine months and opened on Wednesday 22 November 1876. Ashwin was born in 1816 and appointed draftsman to the Central Road Board in 1855. He was promoted to Surveyor (engineer) on 11 March 1861. He died while returning to England on 29 April 1878.

The bridge was bypassed in 1966, and deteriorated before an extensive restoration program was carried out in 1988.

In 2008, its engineering heritage was recognized by the installation of a marker provided by Engineers Australia's Engineering Heritage Recognition Program.

On 25 May 2023, only days before a scheduled engineering inspection was to take place, the bridge collapsed into the Gawler river resulting in severe damage. the timbers of the bridge were recovered and an assessment of their condition and the potential restoration was carried out.

== Comparisons ==
Only two other early laminated timber arch bridges are known in Australia, the 1873 Old Currency Creek Road Bridge off Goolwa - Strathalbyn Road which has been modified by the installation of riveted iron girders, and the 1863 Sunnyhill Bridge, which was inundated by the flooding of Millbrook Reservoir.
