= River Torrens =

River in Australia

Torrens Karrawirra Parri
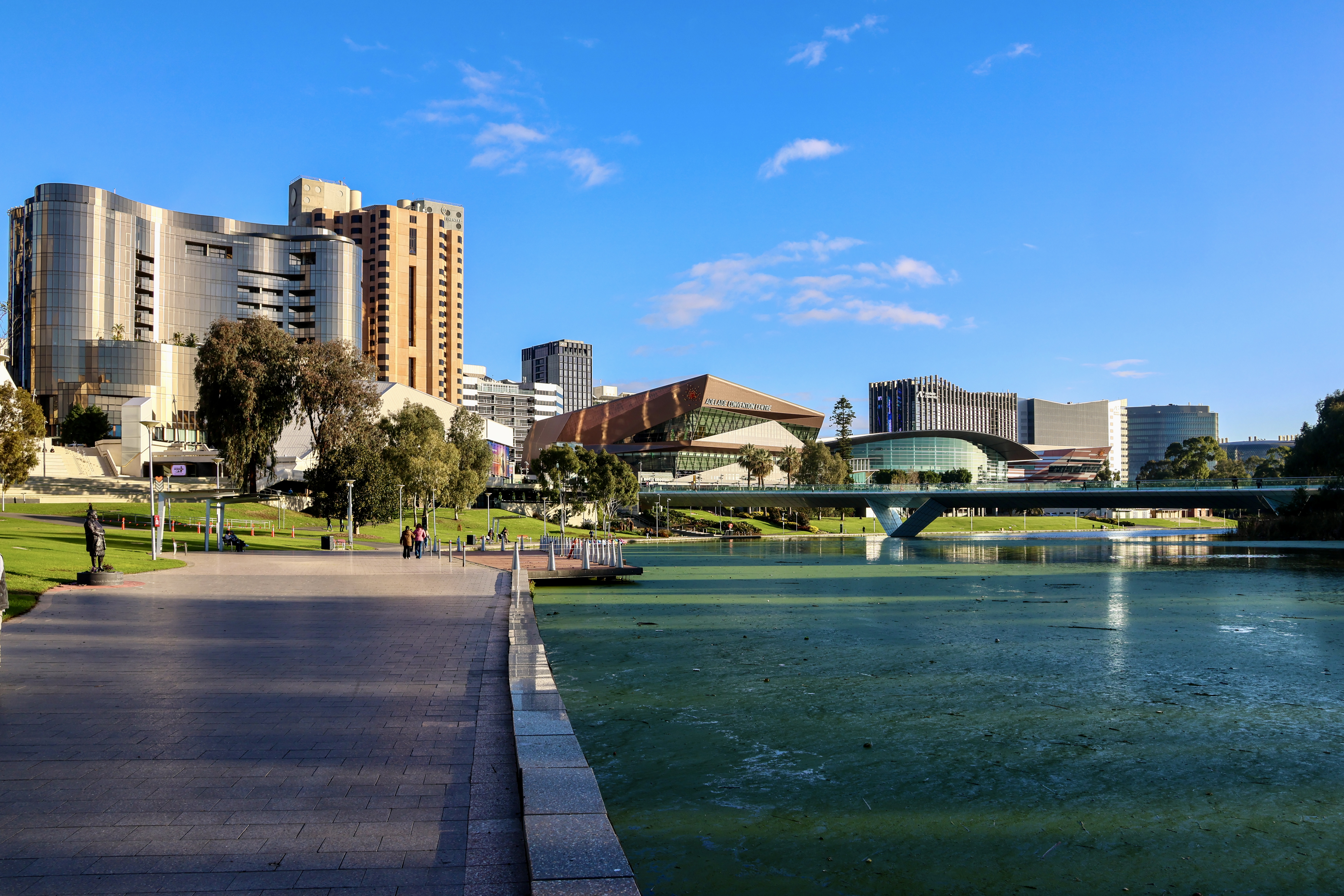
- View of Elder Park, the Riverside Precinct and the Torrens Lake in 2026

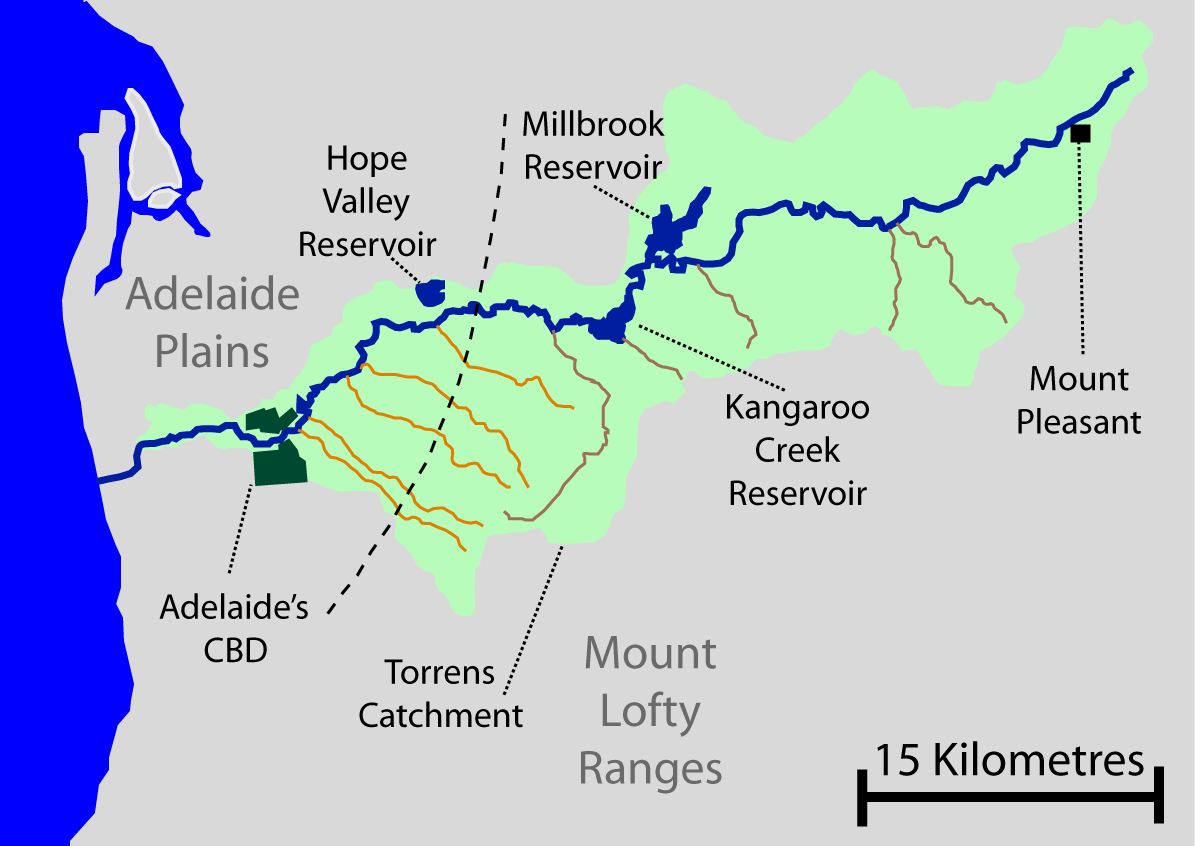
- Torrens catchment, creeks and reservoirs

- Location of the river mouth in South Australia
- Etymology: Robert Torrens
- Native name: Karrawirraparri (Kaurna); Tandanyaparri (Kaurna)

Location
- Country: Australia
- State: South Australia
- Region: Adelaide Plains

Physical characteristics
- Source: Mount Lofty Ranges
  - location: Mount Pleasant
  - elevation: 480 m (1,570 ft)
- Mouth: Gulf St Vincent
  - location: Henley Beach South
  - coordinates: 34°55′S 138°36′E
  - elevation: 0 m (0 ft)
- Length: 85 km (53 mi)
- Basin size: 508 km^{2} (196 sq mi)
- Discharge
  - location: mouth
  - average: 0.71 m^{3}/s (25 cu ft/s)

Basin features
- Reservoir: Kangaroo Creek Reservoir

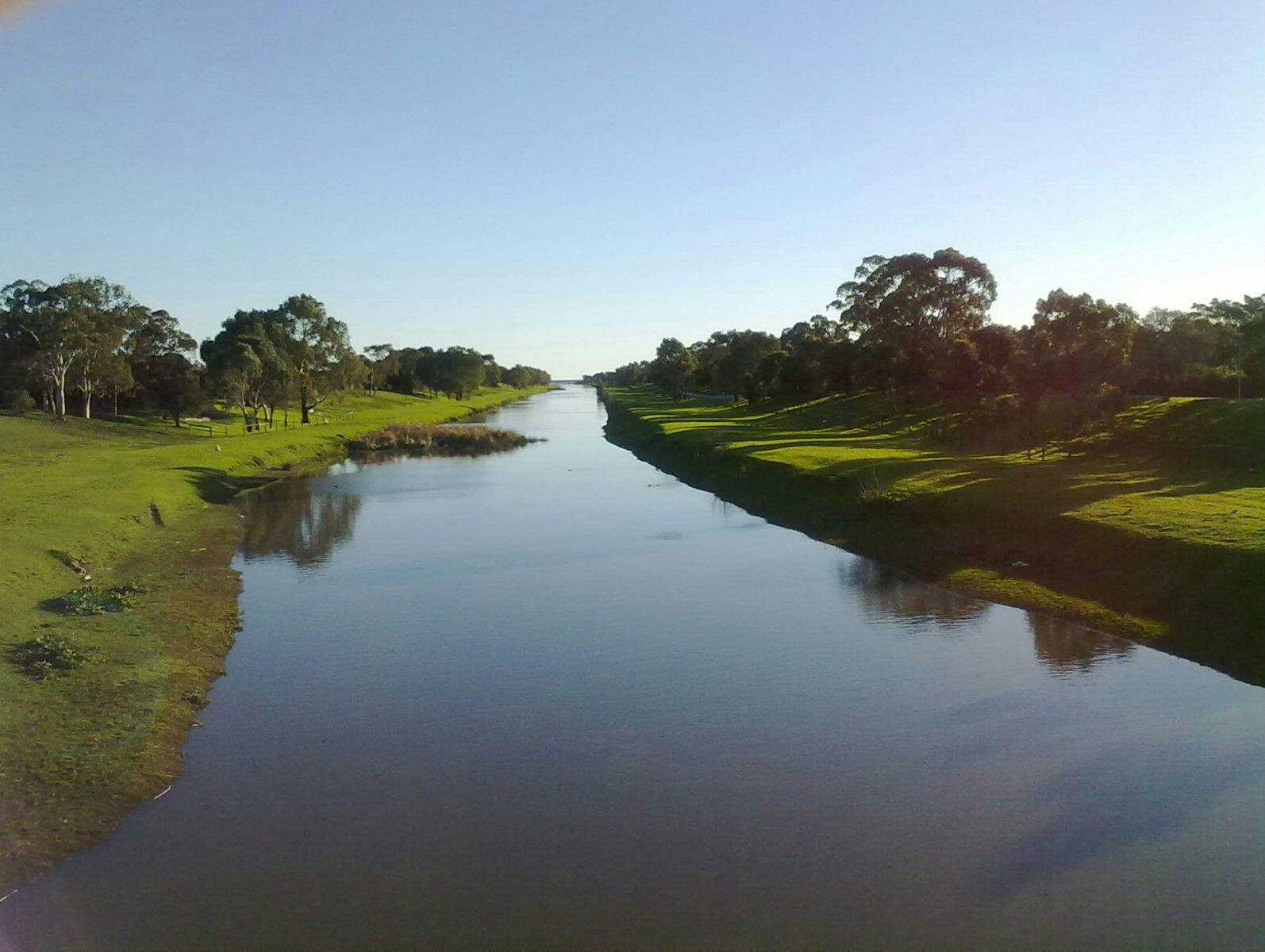
View west towards the Torrens outlet from the Davis Bridge, Tapleys Hill Road

The River Torrens /ˈtɒrənz/ (Karrawirra Parri / Karrawirraparri) is the most significant river of the Adelaide Plains. It was one of the main reasons for the siting of the city of Adelaide, capital of South Australia. It flows 85 kilometres (53 mi) from its source in the Adelaide Hills near Mount Pleasant, across the Adelaide Plains, past the city centre and empties into Gulf St Vincent between Henley Beach South and West Beach. The upper stretches of the river and the reservoirs in its watershed supply a significant part of the city's water supply.

The river is also known by the native Kaurna name for the river—Karrawirra Parri or Karrawirraparri (karra meaning redgum, wirra meaning forest and parri meaning river), having been officially dual-named in 2001. Another Kaurna name for the river was Tarndaparri (Kangaroo river). The river was thought to be a reflection of the Milky Way ("wodliparri"), and was the heartland of the Kaurna people, who lived along its length and around the tributary creeks.

At its 1836 exploration by William Light, an inland bend was chosen as the site of the Adelaide city centre and North Adelaide. The river was first named the Yatala by the initial exploration party, but later renamed to honour Robert Torrens senior, chairman of the board of Colonisation Commissioners for South Australia from 1834 to 1841 (when he was sacked). From March 1837 settlers camped in tents and makeshift huts along the west end of the River Torrens and freely used the river's resources. A Native Location was created on the north banks of the Torrens and indigenous labour was often used by the settlers for tasks such as hewing wood or delivering water. During the early years of settlement, the river acted as both the city's primary water source and main sewer, leading to outbreaks of typhoid.

Since European settlement the river has been a frequently touted tourist attraction. The river's long linear parks and a constructed lake in the lower stretch are an icon of the city. The river's flora and fauna have been both deliberately and accidentally impacted since settlement. In the 19th century, native forests were cleared, gravel removed for construction and many foreign species introduced. With construction of the linear parks, many species native to the river have been replanted, and introduced species have been controlled as weeds.

The river and its tributaries are highly variable in flow, and together drain an area of 508 square kilometres (196 sq mi). They range from sometimes raging torrents, damaging bridges and flooding city areas, to trickles and completely dry in summer. Winter and spring flooding has prompted the construction of flood reduction works. A constructed sea outlet, landscaped linear parks and three holding reservoirs contain peak flow.

== Physiography ==
The River Torrens runs largely westward from the Adelaide Hills, through the centre of Adelaide to the Gulf St Vincent. It originates close to the eastern fault scarp of the Mount Lofty Ranges, near Mount Pleasant, approximately 480 metres (1,575 ft) above sea level. It runs predominantly along faulted north-south ground structures, which were formed over 250 million years ago during the Paleozoic era then further dislocated during the Cretaceous and earliest Tertiary. There is a 400-metre (1,300 ft) subsidence along the Para Fault which also affects the rivers flow. This subsidence was formed in the last two million years, after the Pliocene era.

From its origin to Birdwood the river follows rolling, relatively level country before entering a hilly section that continues to Gumeracha. The river then follows sedimentary rock strata before entering a gorge after Cudlee Creek. It flows through the gorge to Athelstone, passing over the Eden Fault Zone of the Adelaide Hills face and associated escarpment. After the scarp it flows over sedimentary rocks of varying resistance to erosion, which has led to interspersed narrows and broad basins. From the base of the Adelaide Hills to the Adelaide central business district it runs in a shallow valley with a terraced floor, then down the slope of its own alluvial fan. The structure of this fan shows that the river formerly entered Gulf St Vincent via the Port River. Over time the Torrens deposited sediment, choking its own outflow; becoming locked behind coastal sand dunes and forming the swampy areas of the Cowandilla Plains and The Reedbeds.

=== Tributaries ===
The Torrens is fed by numerous seasonal creeks, which are dry for most of the year in their lower reaches, but prone to occasional flooding during the winter and spring. There are five main creeks that join it from the southern side as it crosses the Adelaide Plains east of Adelaide, and at least five more in its path through the Adelaide Hills.

The plains tributaries, known as First to Fifth Creeks, lie to the east of the city, with First being the most southerly and the rest numbered consecutively northward. They were once named Greenhill, Hallett, Todd, Anstey and Ormsby rivulets respectively, and had Kaurna names before European settlement.

First, Second and Third Creeks have been particularly heavily modified. Some sections have been converted to concrete channels; others run through landscaped private gardens and some run in underground pipes. Much of the original vegetation has disappeared from the creeks, particularly those closest to the city. Introduced species including olives, bamboo, boxthorn, watsonia and blackberries have displaced native flora. There is some risk of flooding from all of these eastern suburbs creeks, as shown by the Floodplain Study, which includes plans and maps drawn up by the City of Burnside and neighbouring councils.

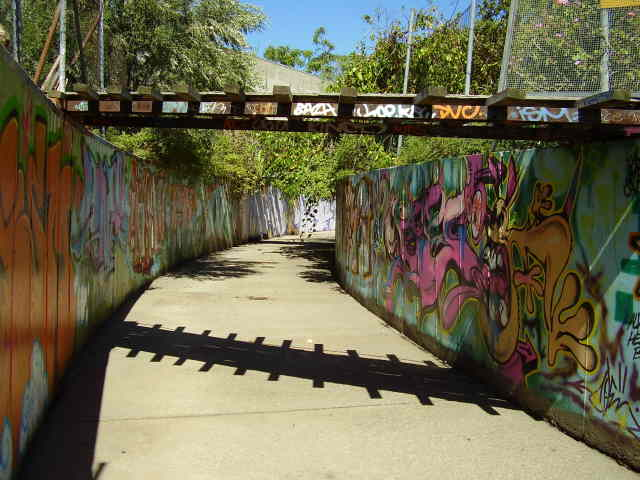
Second Creek at St Peters, showing open canal at that point

First Creek begins in Cleland Wildlife Park on the western side of Mount Lofty and Crafers, flows north-west through the south-eastern suburbs, past a drop at the Waterfall Gully falls, through Hazelwood and Tusmore Parks, and Marryatville High School, before discharging into the Torrens near Adelaide Zoo. Much of its course through the suburbs has been canalised, some underground. About 7.5% of its flow is diverted as it flows through the Adelaide Botanic Garden to create the First Creek Wetland, a scheme set up to ensure water security and to encourage diversity of flora and fauna in the area, thus helping to maintain healthy urban environments. Botanic Creek runs through the eastern Adelaide parklands from south to north, into the Adelaide Botanic Garden before joining First Creek.

Second Creek arises in the Summertown area of the Adelaide Hills, north of First Creek, and flows through Greenhill, through Slape Gully, entering the more populated suburbs as it flows through the Michael Perry Reserve in Stonyfell and onwards through the eastern suburbs of Erindale, Marryatville, Kensington (open at Borthwick Park) and Norwood, much of it canalised underground as far as St Peters. The St Peters section is an open canal shortly before it joins the Torrens. It was once called Hallet's Rivulet. Stonyfell Creek, arising on the eastern boundary of Stonyfell, flows through Kensington Gardens, including an open stretch in the Reserve before again being piped underground under West Terrace, passing under Kensington Park and Beulah Park. It joins Second Creek near the junction of Magill and Portrush Roads.

First and Second Creeks come within about 46 metres (50 yd) of each other in Marryatville, with formerly only flat land between them.

Third Creek arises near Norton Summit and flows through the suburbs of Magill, Tranmere, Trinity Gardens and Payneham, much of the way underground, before discharging into the Torrens at Felixstow.

Fourth Creek, or Morialta Creek, arises on the other side of Norton Summit, with various tributaries flowing into it from Marble Hill and Lobethal. It is most well known for its falls in Morialta Conservation Park. "Moriatta", a Kaurna word meaning "ever flowing", is now the official name of Fourth Creek. This name has been adapted to Morialta, which is now the name of an electoral district, school and the park through which the creek flows.

Fifth Creek arises within the Morialta Conservation Park, runs alongside Montacute Road for some way and discharges into the Torrens at Athelstone.

The largest catchment of the Torrens is Sixth Creek in the Adelaide Hills, which joins the Torrens at Castambul on Gorge Road.

=== Water flow ===
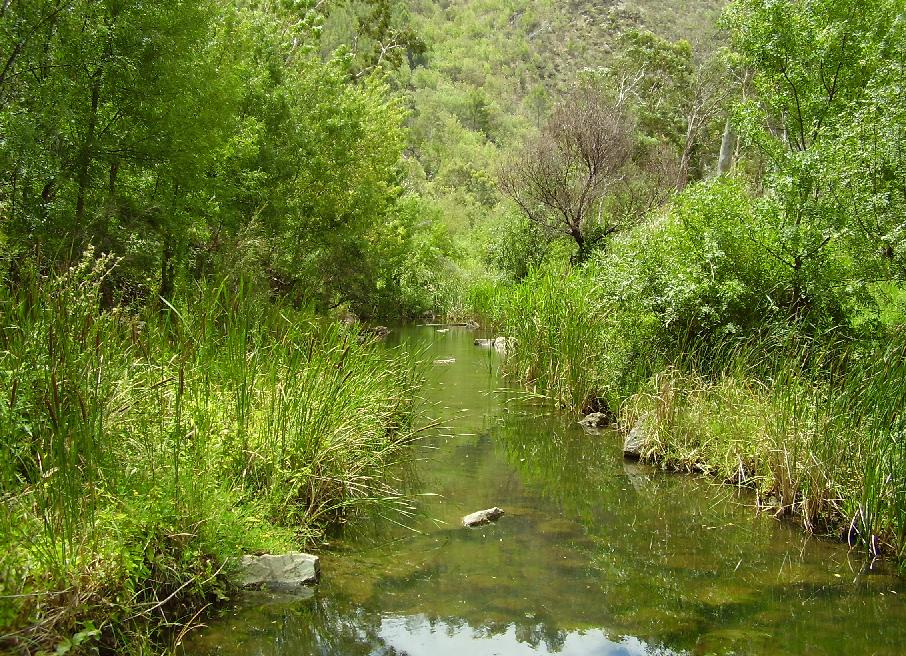
The river in summer at base of the Adelaide Hills, Athelstone

At the time of European settlement the river was a summertime chain of waterholes bounded by large gum trees. Flowing through the area where the city of Adelaide is sited the river was sometimes invisible beneath its gravel stream bed. It frequently flooded in winter and did not reach the sea, instead ending at coastal dunes where its waters created a vast but shallow freshwater wetlands. These wetlands, known as The Reedbeds after the dominant vegetation, occupied a large area of the western Adelaide Plains and were also fed by other waterways.

The river only flowed to the sea through the Port River, Barker Inlet, and Patawalonga River following heavy rain.

The river's catchment area of approximately 500 km^{2} (193 sq mi) is the largest of any waterway within the Adelaide region. The upper reaches are used to create a potable water supply for metropolitan Adelaide with the river supplying three of Adelaide's eight reservoirs. The upper catchment has an average annual rainfall of between 575 millimetres (22.6 in) at its eastern end to 1,025 millimetres (40.4 in) near Uraidla. The Torrens has a very variable flow leaving early settlers to use trial and error in determining bridge heights, with many bridges consequently being washed away. Due to the variability of Adelaide's climate, flow rates can change from a trickle to flood conditions quickly. On 5 June 1889, prior to major flooding, the flow rate before it entered the suburbs was 0.7 cubic metres per second (25 cu ft/s), rising to 129.1 m^{3}/s (4,560 cu ft/s), eight days later.

What the River Torrens may be capable of performing for a week or two of the rainy season beyond sweeping down to the swamp the summer filth of Adelaide we cannot guess; but the Torrens at other times is not a river at all, but merely a chain of fresh water pools. At the present moment, its running water may be spanned with the hand and sounded with the forefinger

— The Register, 1838

Since settlement it has repeatedly flooded, sometimes with disastrous consequences. Adelaide's western suburbs were especially prone to flooding due to their location on the river's alluvial fan. As development of Adelaide progressed the amount of rainfall required for flooding decreased and consequent damage increased. Increased stormwater runoff, modification of the river's banks and other changes all served to exacerbate the problem. Work done by various groups to minimise flooding was often counter productive with the creation of levees, moving and widening channels and other works simply shifting the flooding elsewhere.

Two early floods were, 18 September 1841 which resulted in two people drowning while trying to cross the river at Klemzig, and 22 September 1844, the largest recorded since settlement began, when "Shands' Brewery" was washed away after the river undermined its foundations. The 1899 flood was particularly widespread with extensive flooding of both the river and its tributaries, after a year with 785.6 millimetres (30.93 in) of rain compared to the Adelaide average of 530 millimetres (21 in). The river flooded market gardens and farms throughout its hills course causing extensive damage. Norwood was inundated to The Parade, Adelaide to Pirie and Rundle Streets, and many areas west of the city were left in a shallow lake. The river ran 9 feet (2.7 m) deep over the weir near Thorndon Park Reservoir, 3 feet (0.9 m) over the Torrens Lake Weir and 1 foot (0.3 m) over the Morphett Street Bridge. The Underdale (or Holbrooks) Bridge was destroyed, the Torrens Lake weir's bridge damaged, and the Felixstow Bridge over the Fourth Creek washed away.

== European exploration and naming ==
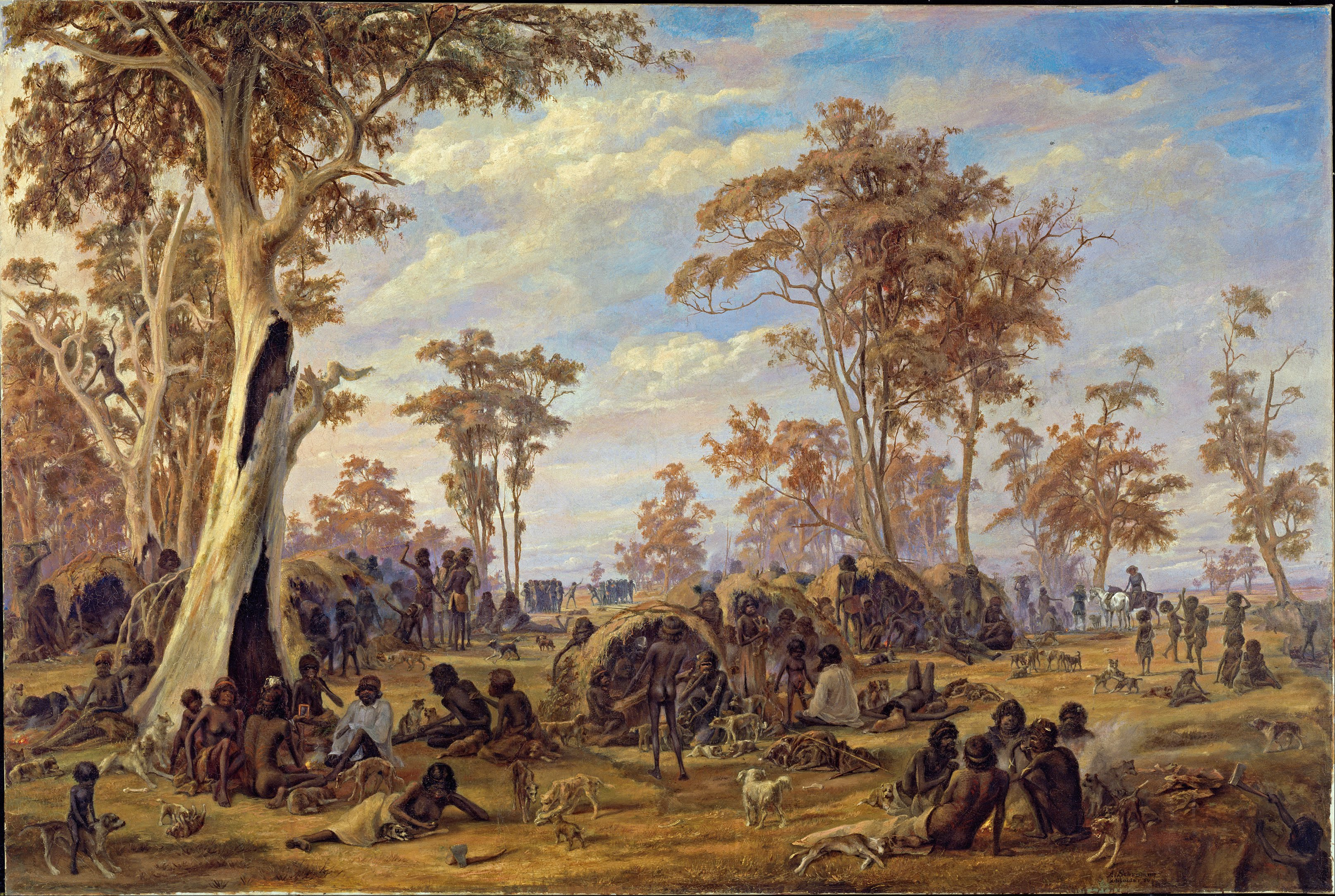
Alexander Schramm, A Tribe of Natives on the Banks of the River Torrens, 1850

The first European sighting of the river was in November 1836 by an exploration party comprising Lieutenant W.G. Field, John Morphett and George Strickland Kingston. The river was named "The Yatala" by the party but later renamed by Surveyor General Colonel William Light after Robert Torrens, chairman of the South Australian Colonisation Commission. On 29 December 1836 Light announced the location of the new city of Adelaide, 6 miles (9.7 km) inland on the river's banks. The first Europeans to explore the Torrens Gorge to the headwaters and sources of the river were Dr George Imlay and John Hill in January 1838.

In recent years the river has been dually known by the indigenous Kaurna people's name of Karra wirra-parri (meaning river of the red gum forest), referring to the dense eucalyptus forest that lined its banks prior to clearing by early settlers. This name, alternatively Karra-weera, only referred to the lake section of the river, between Adelaide and North Adelaide. It was known as Karrundo-ingga at Hindmarsh, Witoingga near the reed beds, and Yertala everywhere when in flood, which has survived as Yatala in the naming of various places in Adelaide.

Pirltawardli, now within Park 1/Pitawardli, a location next to the river near the weir, on the western side of North Adelaide, is an area of great historical significance, as the location of a Kaurna camp and later the first Christian mission and school in South Australia. The missionaries documented the Kaurna language, which formed the basis of the 21st-century language revival of the language. The "native location" and school moved from the southern side of the river (now Bonython Park) to the northern side several times.

== Changes after 1836 ==
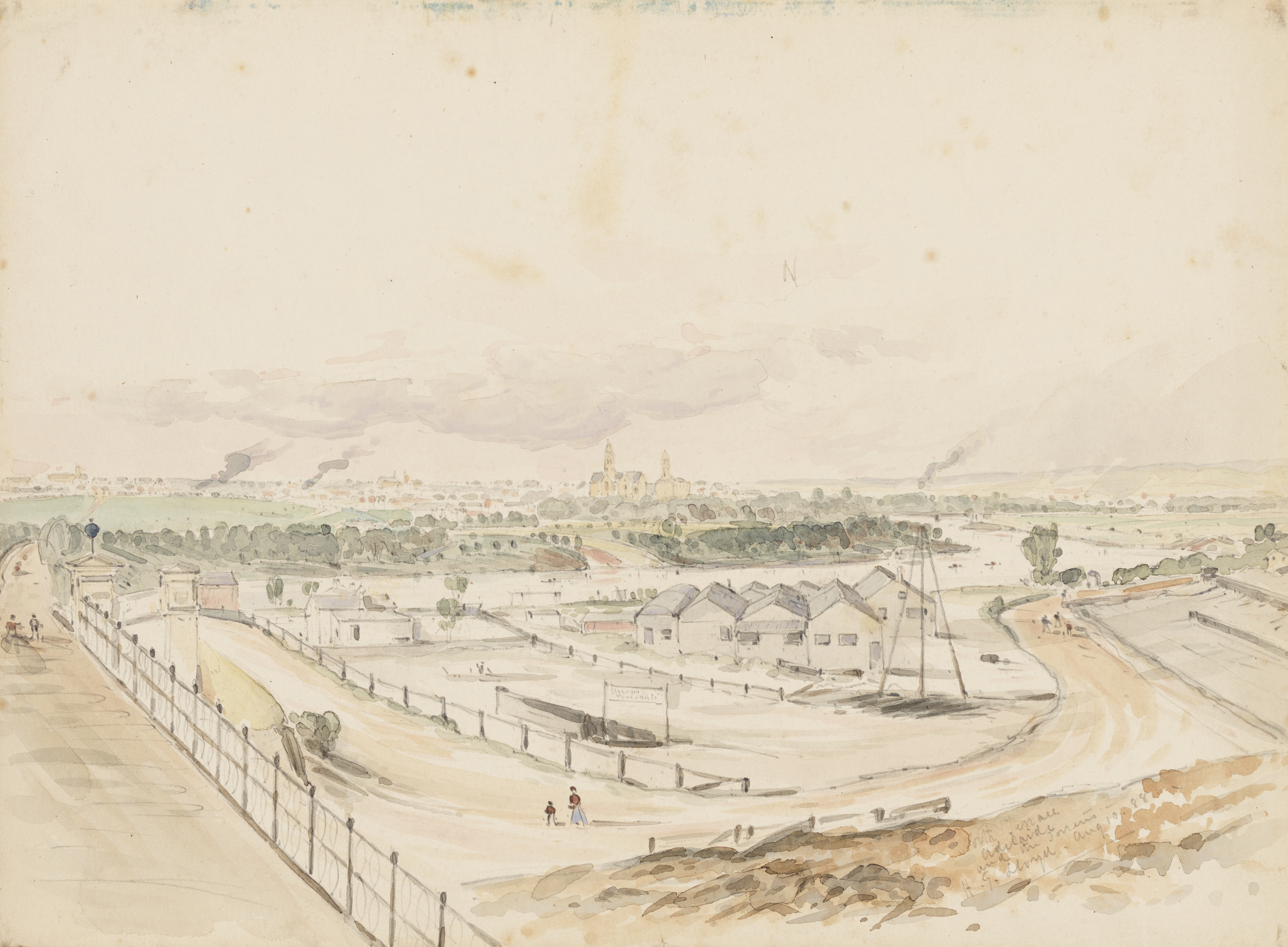
North Terrace, Adelaide and the Torrens, 10 August 1888

During early years of colonisation, the surrounding trees were cut down and the river's gravel used in road making and construction of buildings. As the natural environment was removed, the banks were eroded and the riverbed gradually levelled as waterholes filled. By 1878 the river was noted to be a malodorous, black sewer rather than the sylvan stream of the 1830s.

...anything in the guise of a river more ugly than the Torrens would be impossible to either see or describe...

— Anthony Trollope prior to 1880

Much of the river's catchment area consists of cleared farmland with run-off captured in private dams to sustain farming over Adelaide's dry summer. Combined with the river's use for potable water this has greatly reduced the overall flow especially in the lower river.

=== Flood mitigation ===
A flood mitigation bill was passed in 1917 to not only combat the damage caused by floods but also the public health risk due to the lack of mains sewerage in the western suburbs. Popular opinion favoured diverting the flood waters into their "natural" outlets of the Port and Patawalonga Rivers. The chief engineer of the department of works favoured a cutting through sand dunes near Henley Beach allowing the river an outlet, mitigating floods and preventing silting of the Port River. He also advocated the construction of a reservoir where the Kangaroo Creek Reservoir is now, to both mitigate floods and provide summer irrigation water for market gardens. Unfortunately the bill lapsed with no action as the government and local councils were unwilling to fund the works. The Millbrook Reservoir opened in 1918 as a summer water source, and flood mitigator if required. A bill was passed in 1923 to enact the earlier plan of cutting through the dunes and adding an upstream regulating weir. Again the bill lapsed due to a lack of commitment from parties on payment.

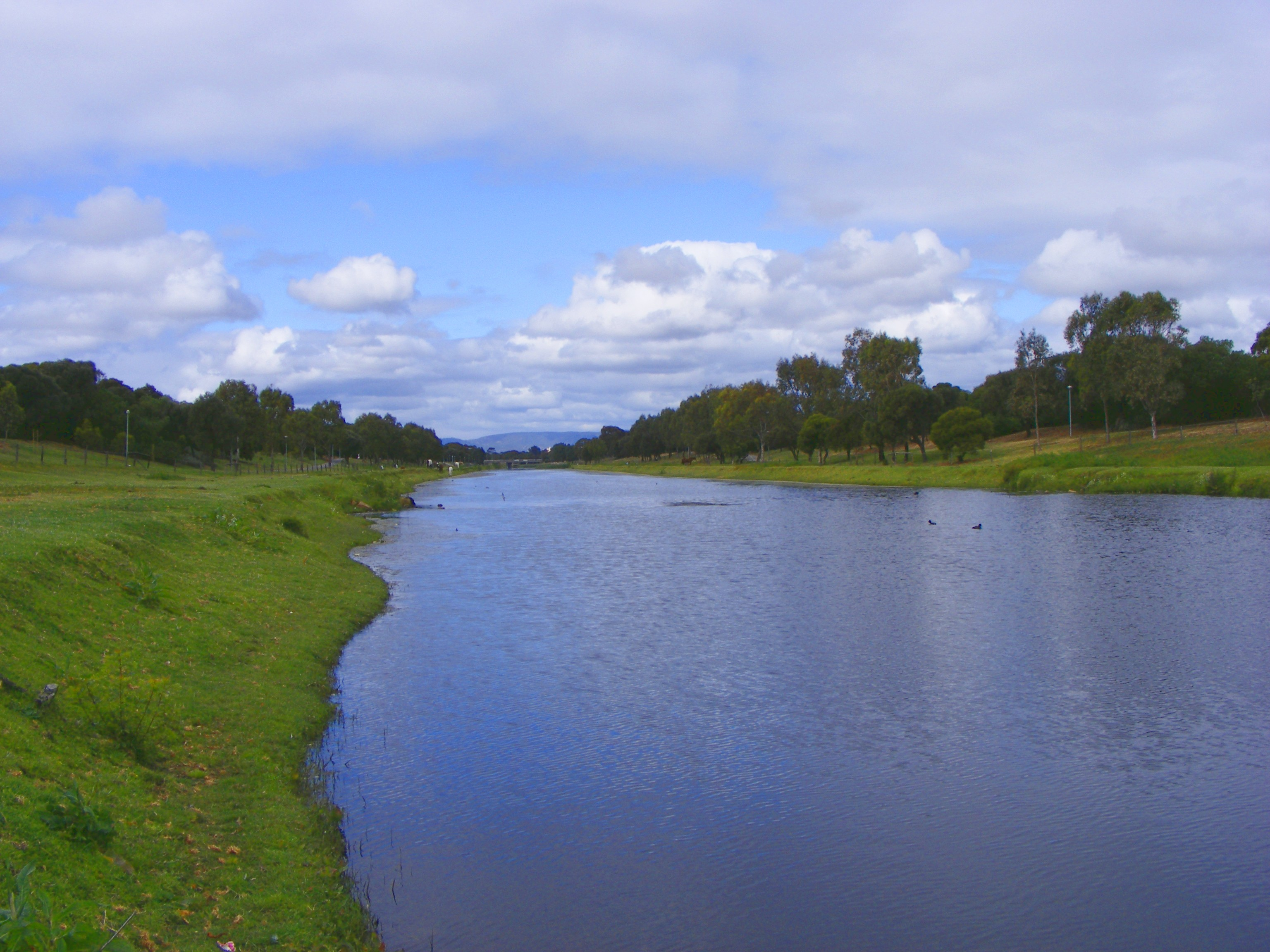
The Torrens's sea outlet, "Breakout Creek"

A major flood in 1931 and another in 1933 led to the latest in a series of government enquiries. In 1934 the "Parliamentary Standing Committee on Public Works" recommended that an outlet for the river be created to accommodate flows of up to 370 m^{3}/s (13,000 cu ft/s), covering a 1-in-60-year flood. The work was partly financed by a Commonwealth Government grant with the State Government arranging for the balance. The State Government, western and eastern local councils and the Municipal Tramways Trust shared interest costs. The scheme was enacted in 1935 with the construction of the Breakout Creek (also sometimes Breakout Channel) to take the Torrens westwards to the sea, completed in 1937. The scheme involved diversion of the river at Lockleys (near Adelaide Airport), with the original channel blocked and a new channel created to the sea. The reedbeds and swamps were subsequently drained and some of their area is now the site for the suburb of West Lakes.

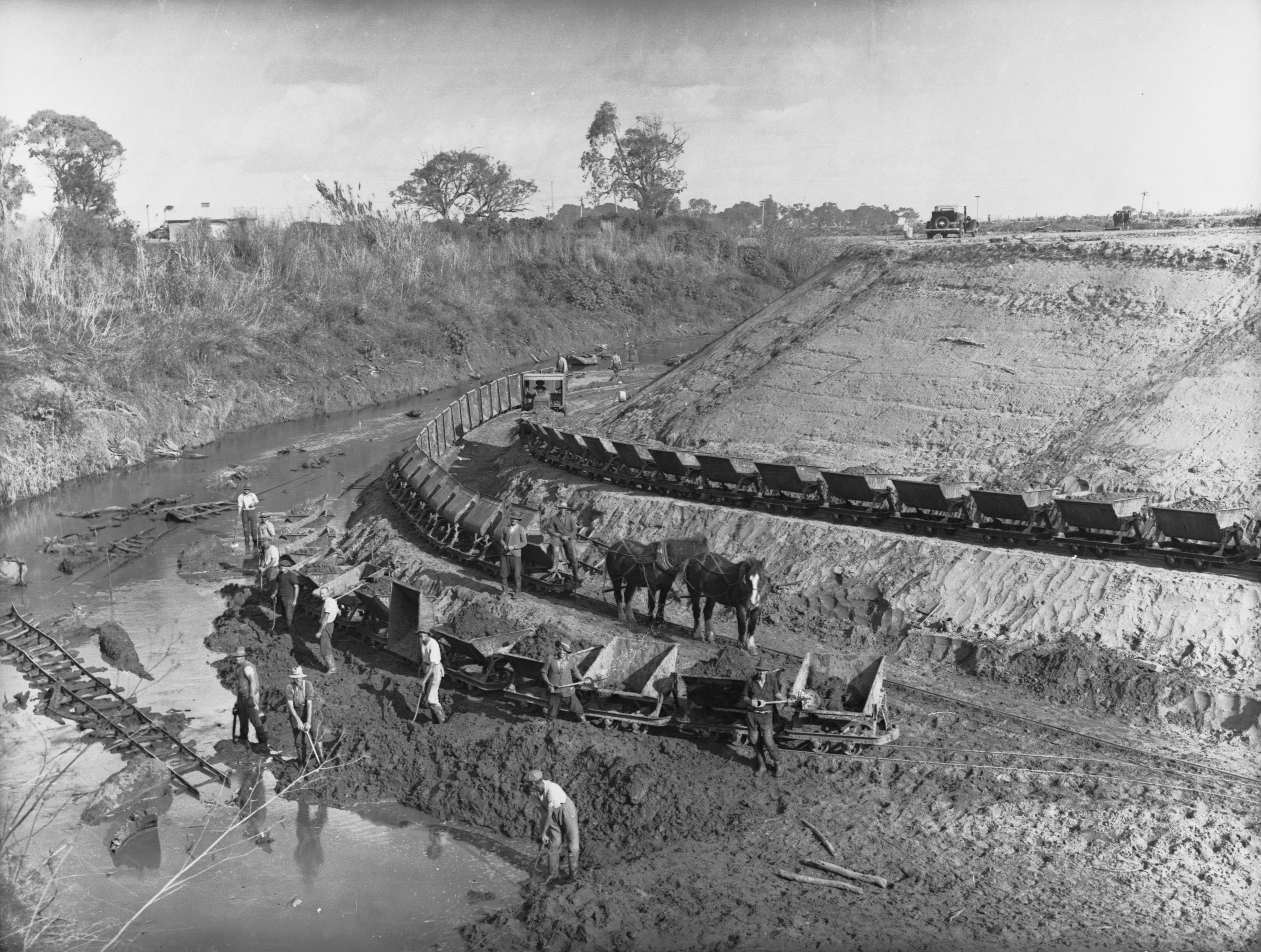
Horse-drawn tramway

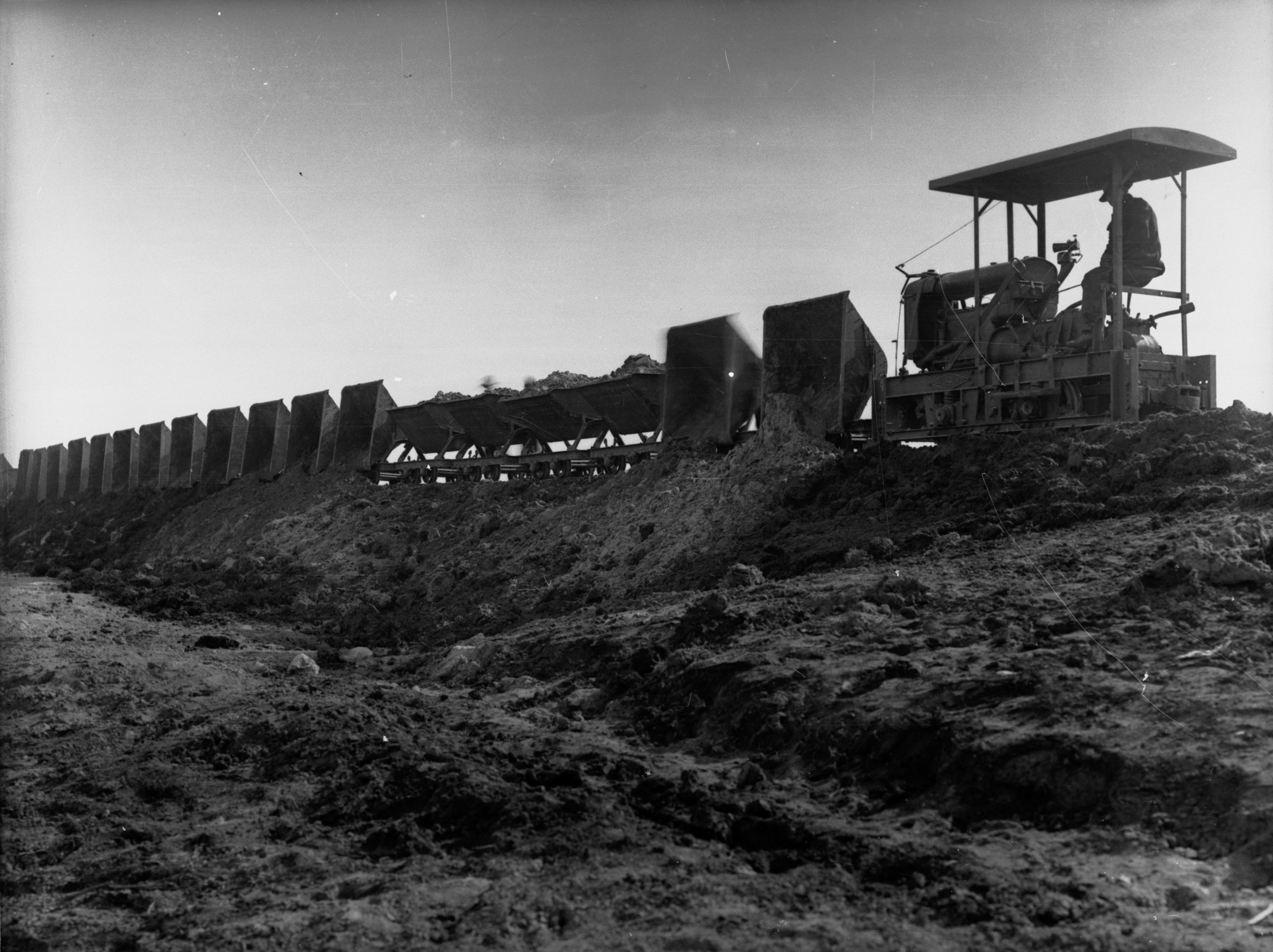
Narrow-gauge diesel loco

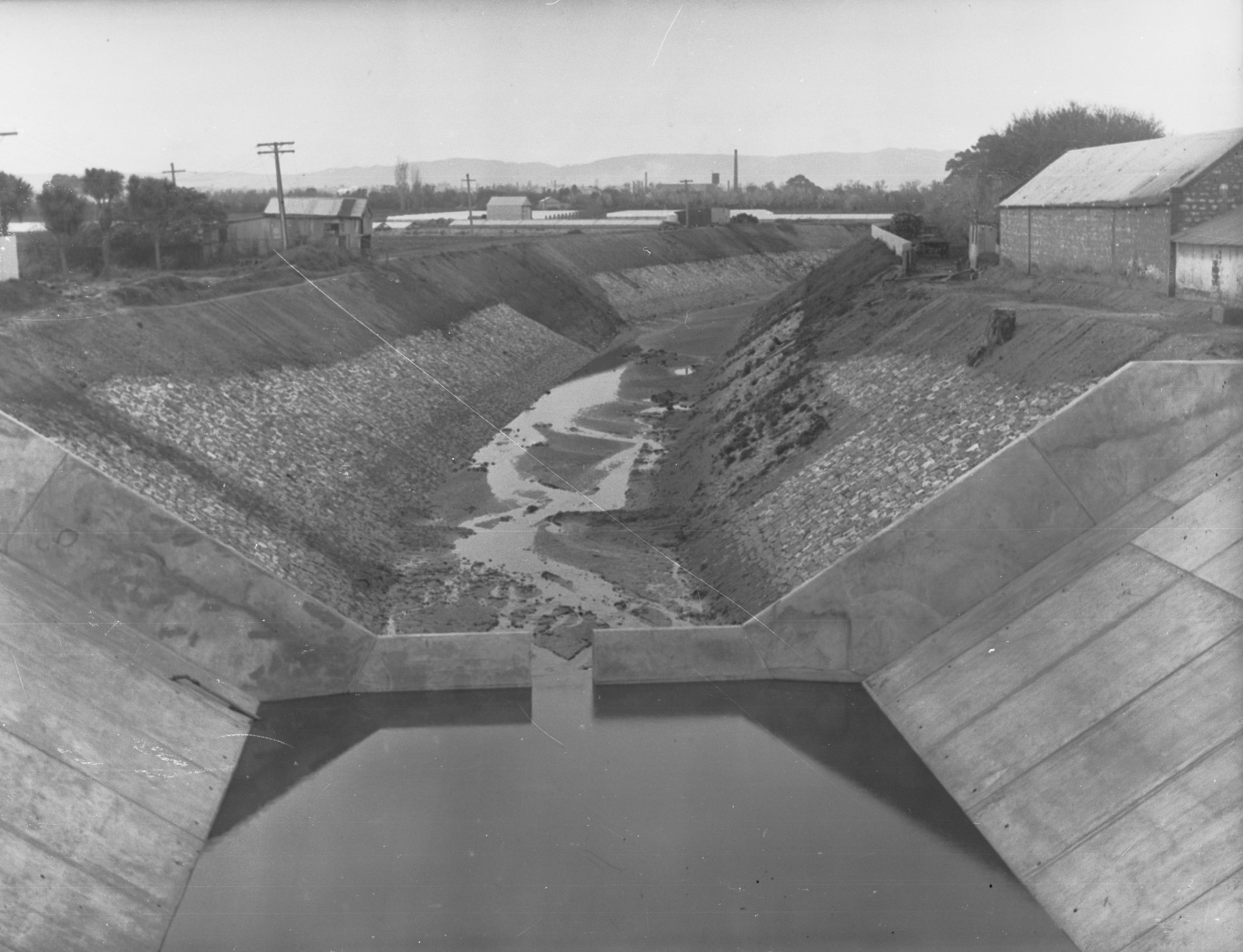
Channel

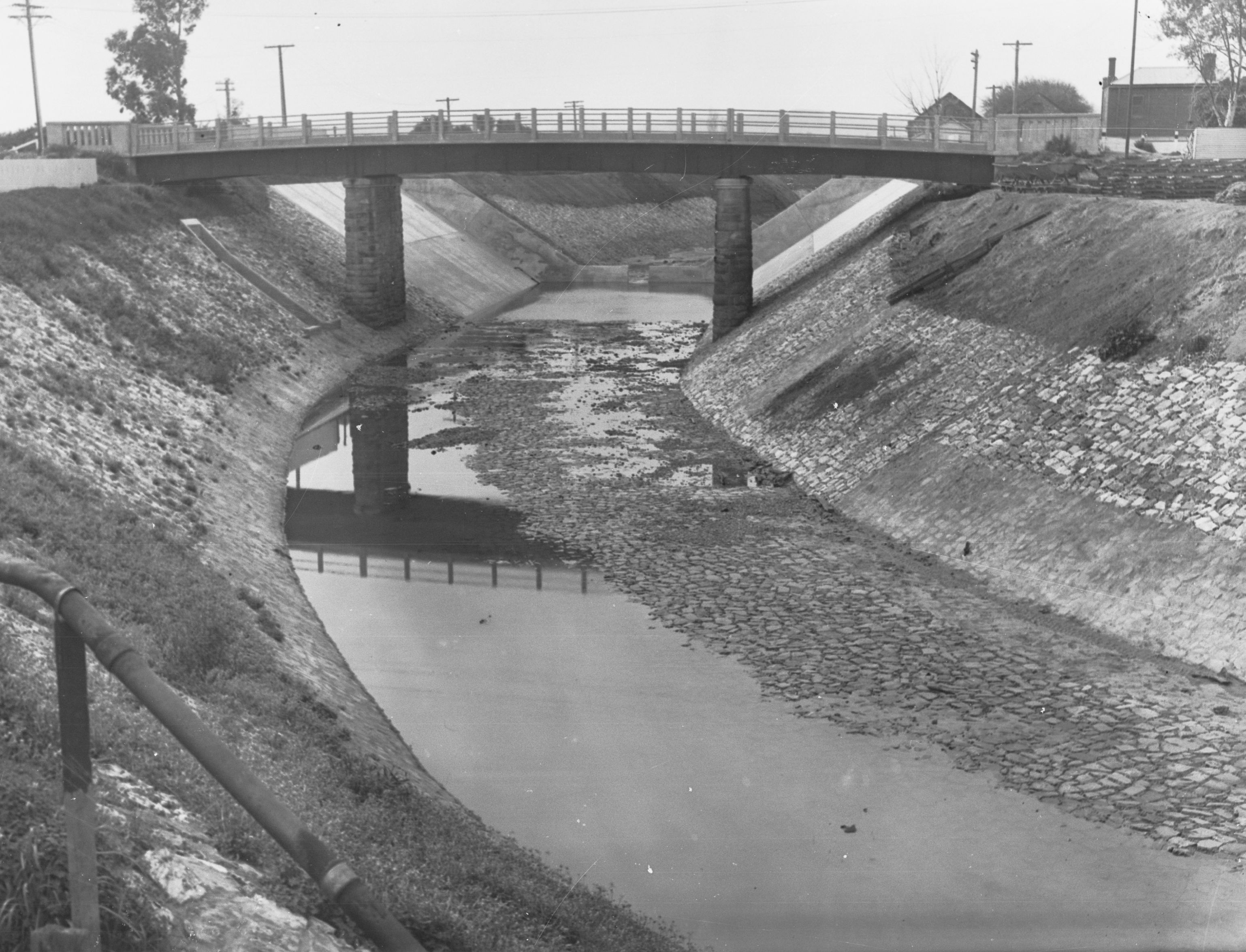
Bridge

Based on recommendations in a 1925 report on flood mitigation, work began in the 1960s on the building of the Kangaroo Creek Reservoir, opened in 1969 with a capacity of 24.4 megalitres (860,000 ft^{3}). It remains the only reservoir damming the river rather than being fed from weirs. The "River Torrens Committee" was formed in 1964 to advise the minister of works on preserving and enhancing the river's natural beauty, and developing it for recreational uses. The "River Torrens Acquisition Act 1970–72" was passed, authorising the purchase of land, in some cases 60 metres (200 ft) back from the top of the river's banks.

By 1980, further development along the riverbanks and removal of levées had reduced the outlet's capacity to a 1-in-35-year flood. A study showed that a 1-in-200-year flood would inundate 13,000 properties; so the Kangaroo Creek dam's level was raised, its spillway modified, the Breakout Creek channel capacity increased and some bridges reinforced. A development plan was approved in 1981 to purchase land along the length of the river, create a flood mitigating linear park and also to modify the Kangaroo Creek dam further. The sea outlet was enlarged to a capacity of 410 m^{3}/s (14,000 cu ft/s) which now covered a 1-in-200-year flood. When the O-Bahn Busway was opened, the bridges were designed to cope with this scale of flood, although the two bridges in St Peters would likely be awash.

=== Torrens Lake ===
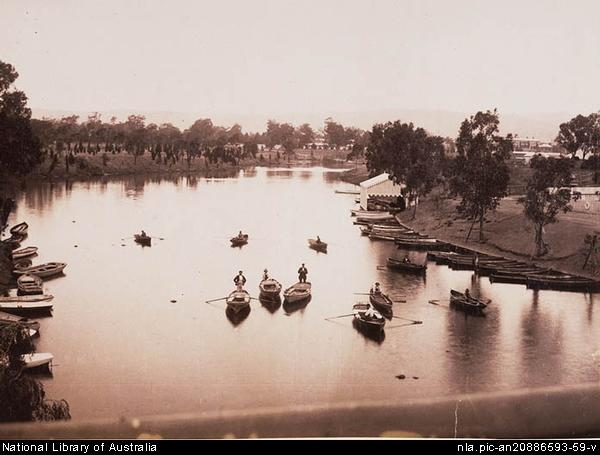
Torrens Lake (with row boats) around 1889

The 470 ML (17 million ft^{3}) Torrens Lake was created in 1881 with the construction of a weir, landscaping of Elder Park and modification of the river's bank and surrounds into an English formal park. The lake forms a centrepiece of many Adelaide events and postcard scenes. Elder Park with its iron rotunda was opened on 28 November 1882. The Rotunda is a largely Glasgow built 9-metre-high (30 ft) iron bandstand which was funded by Sir Thomas Elder, the park being named after him.

In 1867, prison labour from nearby Adelaide Gaol was used to build a wooden dam near the site of the current weir. The dam was poorly constructed and almost immediately the Torrens washed it away. Construction of a permanent concrete weir was begun in November 1880 and completed, at a cost of £7,000, in 1881. The sluice gates were closed to begin filling the 12-hectare (30-acre) Torrens Lake on 1 July 1881. At the lake's official opening on 21 July 1881 an estimated 40,000, almost the entire population of Adelaide, attended. During the 1889 flood, the weir was overwhelmed, its gates jammed, and in trying to free them the weir's designer John Langdon was crippled. The weir was rebuilt from 1928 to 1929 with its footbridge relocated and the centre section replaced. The gates can now be fully raised and the river allowed to flow unimpeded.

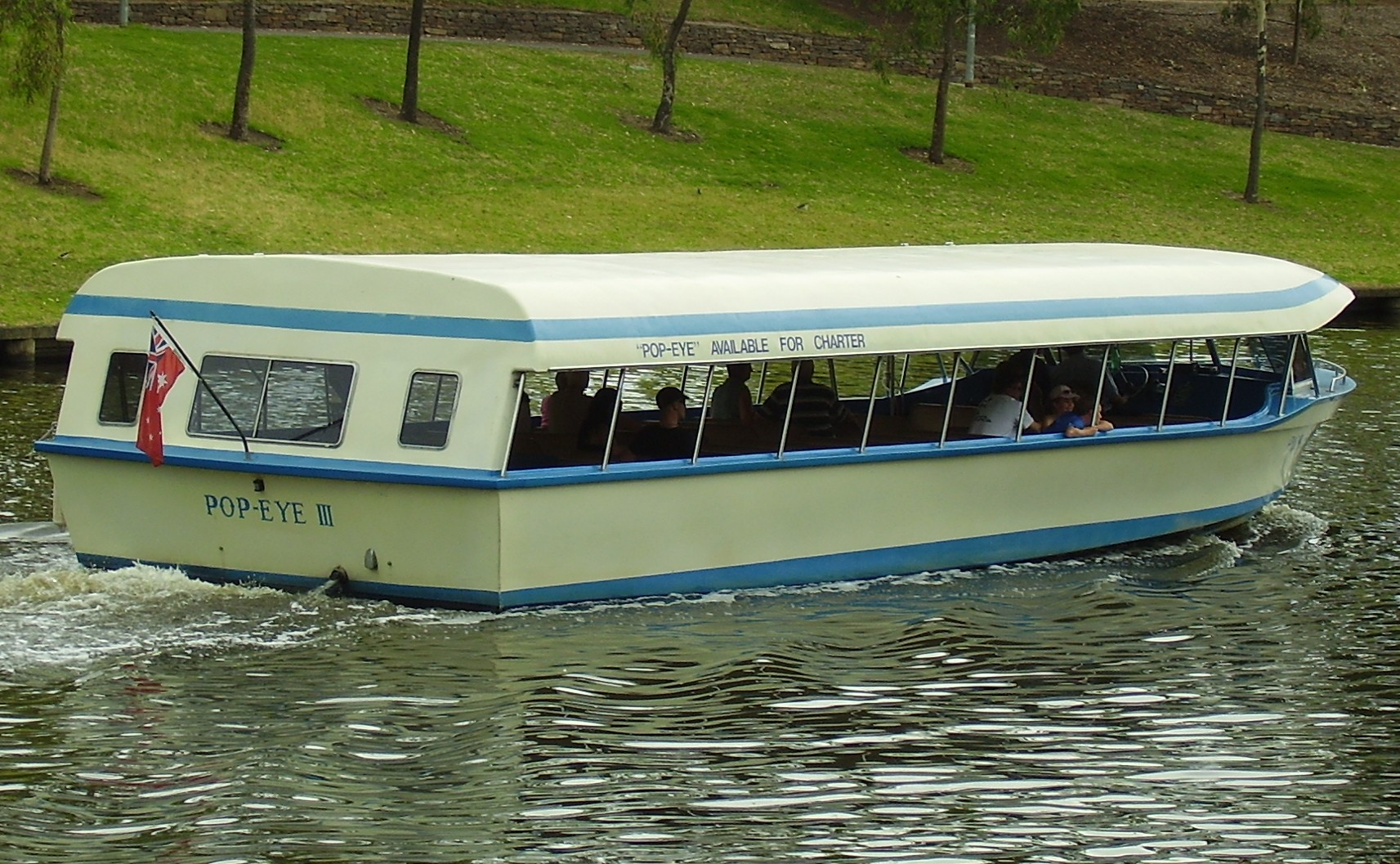
Popeye III

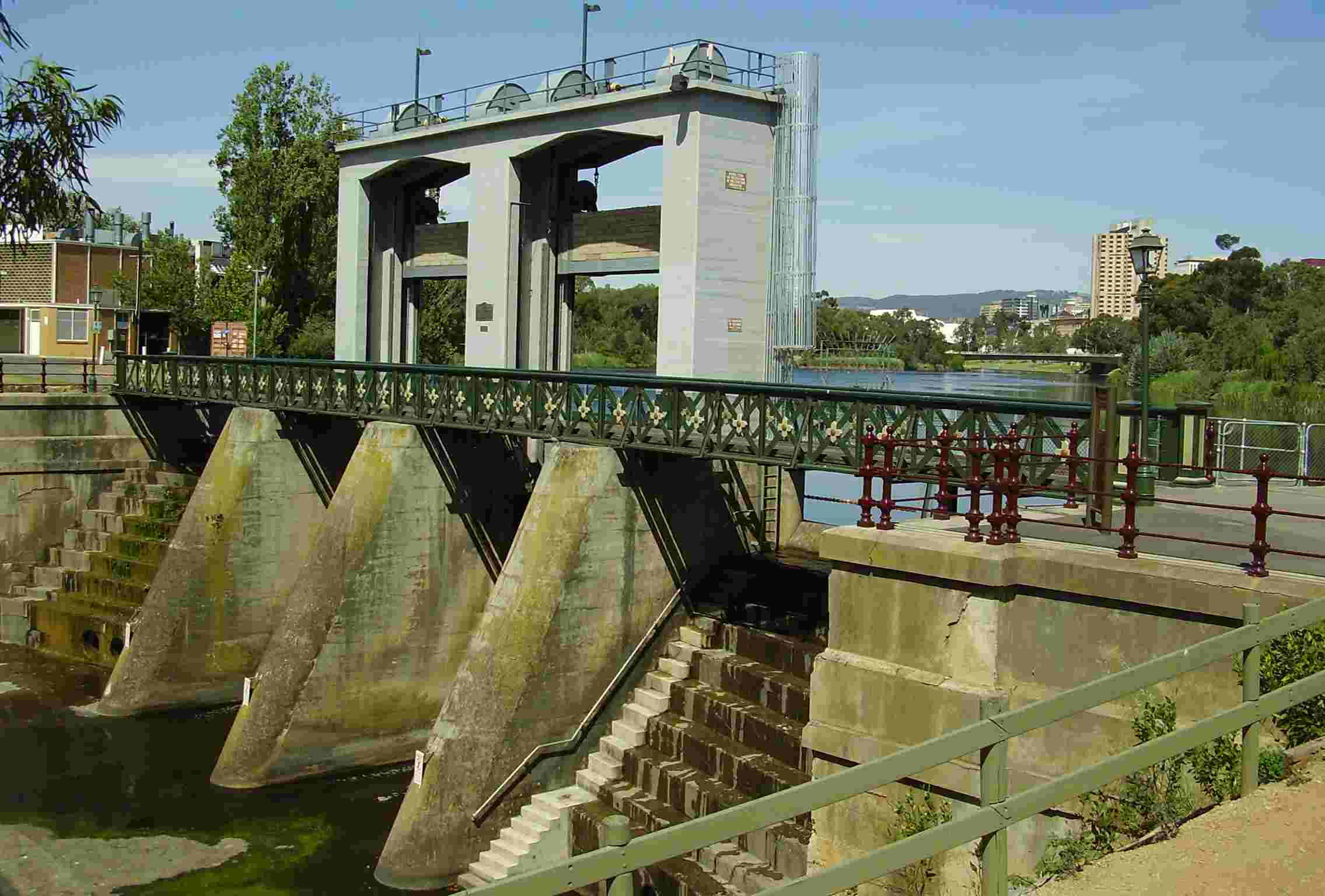
Weir forming the Torrens Lake near Adelaide Gaol

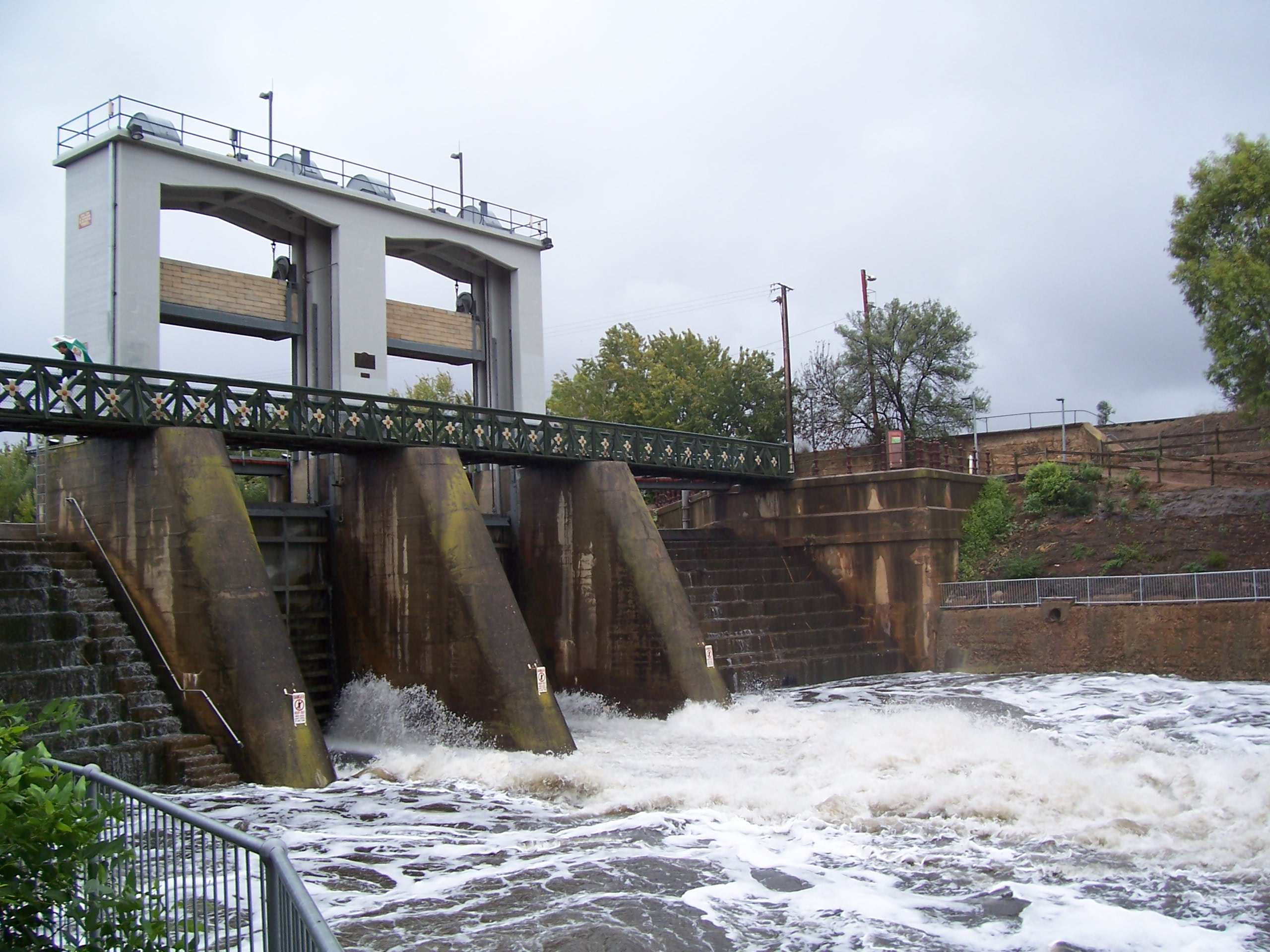
Torrens Weir in full flow during heavy rain, April 2007

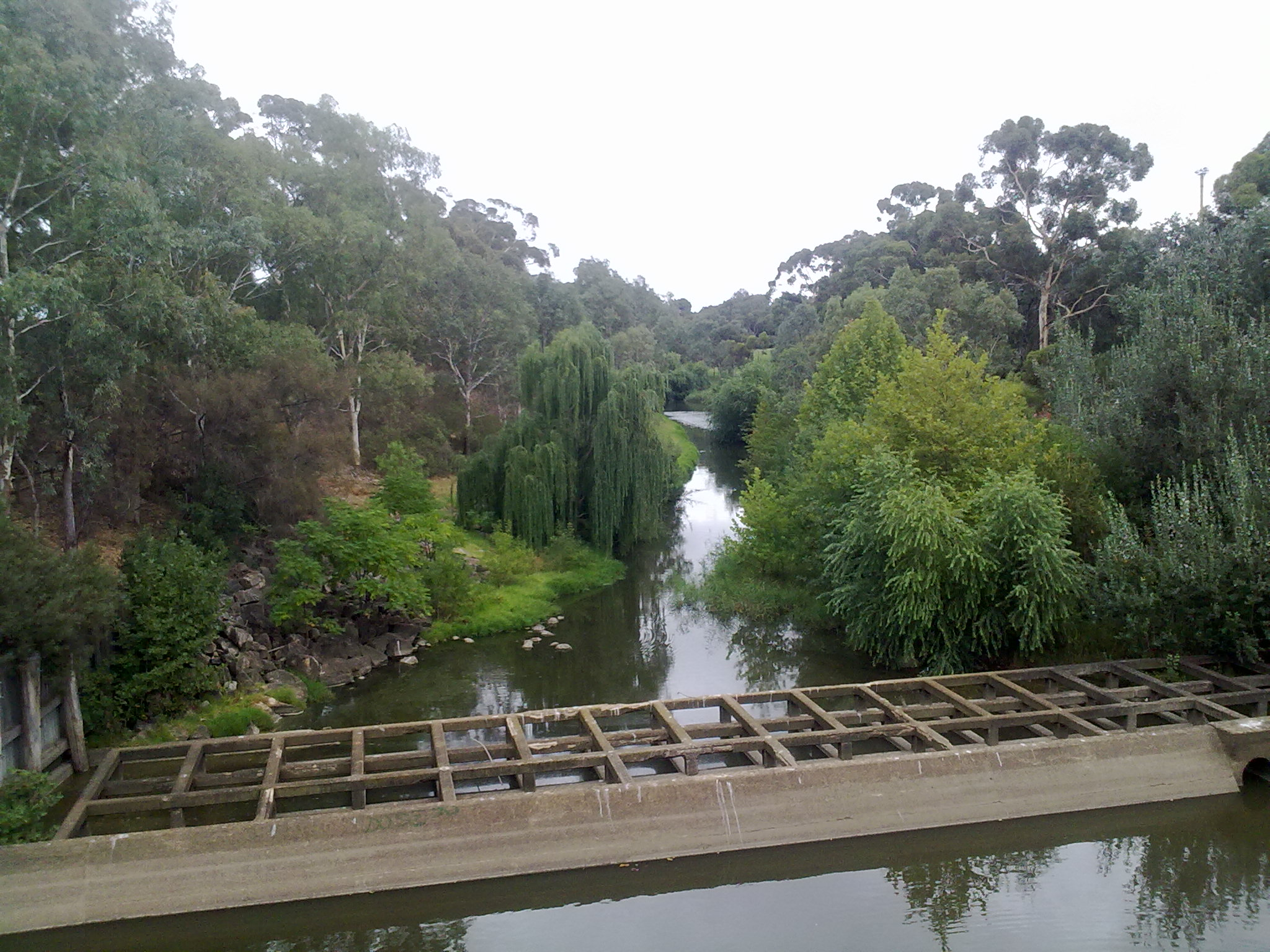
The River Torrens, as seen from the weir

The "Popeye" boats are privately owned recreational ferries that operate on the lake between Elder Park and the Adelaide Zoo. The first boat was launched on the Torrens Lake by Gordon Watts in 1935. It was a 25-foot (7.6 m) boat, built on the banks of the Torrens to hold up to 20 passengers and named Popeye 1. Watts purchased a former Glenelg cruise boat in 1948 and placed it in service as Popeye 2. Over the next two years three new jarrah hulled boats were built at Port Adelaide; carrying 40 passengers each they were numbered Popeye 3 through Popeye 5. Trips on the Popeyes from Elder Park to the zoo became a treasured family outing and the boats hosted weddings and other events. In March 1962 Keith Altman, owner of riverside eatery "Jolley's Boathouse", took over the Popeyes and introduced recreational paddle boats to the river. The Popeyes had a brush with royalty in March 1977 with Popeye 5 ferrying Queen Elizabeth II and Prince Philip followed by a choir in Popeye 4. Prime Minister Malcolm Fraser officially launched three new fibreglass models named Popeyes I, II and III in 1982 as the wooden boats' replacements.

=== Water use ===
In the early days of Adelaide, the Torrens was used for bathing, stock watering, rubbish disposal, water supply and as a de facto sewer and drainage sump. This led to a range of health issues until finally, in 1839, when a dysentery outbreak killed five children in one day, Governor Gawler forbade bathing, clothes washing and the disposal of animal carcases in the Torrens within 1.6 kilometres (1 mi) of town. The quality of the river's water was not helped by water supply methods. Carters used to drive water carts into the Torrens to refill. To prevent this the State Government in 1852 built a facility with steam powered pumps and water storage, from which the carters then filled their casks.

The "Waterworks Act" of 1856 was passed to enable damming of the upstream Torrens for water supply purposes. The resulting "Water Commission" arranged the following year for foundations to be laid for a water supply weir 11 kilometres (7 mi) from Adelaide near Campbelltown. Unsuitable geology and shoddy work by contractors Frost & Watson led to it being washed away in July 1858 and the site abandoned. Engineer Hamilton was replaced by John England. Government then created a Waterworks Department, which started construction of a weir 16 kilometres (10 mi) from the city and reservoir at Thorndon Park in 1859. The weir was completed on 4 June 1860 and the reservoir began supplying piped water in December. Engineer England was found by a Select Committee to have overpaid the contractors and forced to resign. The water was captured at the weir, piped for storage to the Thorndon Park Reservoir then to a water tower at Kent Town. Water from Kent Town storage was distributed via a manually controlled water system, unmetered for its first six years. Within six years 20,000 citizens in Adelaide and Port Adelaide were connected to reticulated water from the Torrens. By 1872, the 2,840 ML (620 million imp gal; 750 million US gal) Hope Valley Reservoir in the foothills of the Adelaide Hills was completed as a storage reservoir, supplied via an aqueduct and tunnel.

Public baths were built in 1861 just north of the current Parliament House. They were supplied with reticulated water from the Torrens and progressively upgraded with the last change a 1940 remodelling including an Olympic-size swimming pool and diving tower. The baths were demolished in 1970 to make way for the Adelaide Festival Centre. The 16,500 ML (3.6 billion imp gal; 4.4 billion US gal) Millbrook Reservoir was constructed high in the Adelaide Hills from 1913 to 1918 submerging the town of Millbrook. An earth bank dam fed by mile long tunnel from a weir on the river at Gumeracha, its elevation allows gravity supply of water to Adelaide's eastern suburbs.

=== Bridges ===
Due to the river's path through the centre of Adelaide, transport necessitated the construction of many bridges. Prior to the bridges all crossings had been via fords which proved a dangerous practice in winter and spring. The first bridge was one of timber built in 1839 approximately 500 metres (1,600 ft) west of the current City bridge, but destroyed by floods in September 1844. In 1849 £6,000 was allocated to bridge the Torrens. Within four years three wooden bridges had been built and subsequently destroyed in floods. The bridges listed below are from up-river to down-river.

Location	Bridge name	Image	Comments/use	Notes
Mount Pleasant			Carries Cricks Mills Road (B35)	
Birdwood			Carries Warren Road (B34)	
Gumeracha			Carries Forreston Road	
Gumeracha			Carries Torrens Valley Road (B10)	
Gumeracha			Carries Gorge Road (T58)	
Cudlee Creek			Carries Gorge Road (T58)	
Cudlee Creek	Union Bridge		Carries Gorge Road (B31) (T58) Opened 28 June 1871 at a cost of £624. A brewery and distillery of the same name opened in 2021 nearby.	
Cudlee Creek			Carries Gorge Road (B31) (T58)	
Paracombe			Carries Gorge Road (B31) (T58)	
Highbury				
Dernancourt			Carries Lower North East Road (A11)	
Dernancourt			Carries Northeast Busway	
Paradise	Dickson's Crossing		Built in 1977 and carries Darley Road; replaced an earlier ford.	
Windsor Gardens				
Klemzig				
Klemzig			Carries Northeast Busway	
Klemzig			Carries Riverside Drive	
Marden	Felixstow Bridge		Built in 1873 and carries OG Road, the bridge was reconstructed in 1892, 1901, 1924 and 1961. The first bridge was narrow, and hay-laden carts often damaged posts while brushing past them.	
Klemzig			Carries Northeast Busway	
Vale Park	Ascot Bridge		Built in 1970 and carries Ascot Avenue (A17) to connect with Lower Portrush Road.	
Marden			Carries Northeast Busway	
Royston Park			Carries Northeast Busway	
Walkerville			Carries Northeast Busway	
Walkerville			Carries Northeast Busway	
Walkerville	St Peters		Carries Northeast Busway	
Gilberton	Tennyson Bridge		Built 1877 and carries Stephen Terrace, the bridge replaced a ford at the same site.	
Gilberton			Carries Northeast Busway	
Gilberton	Swing Bridge		Carries Swing Bridge Lane	
St Peters			Carries Northeast Busway	
Gilberton			Carries Shared Park	
Hackney	Hackney Bridge		First known as the "Second Company Bridge" as the South Australia Company built it, the bridge was built so that wheat farmers from the northern side could access the South Australian Company's flour mill which stood where the Hackney Hotel was later built. The current bridge is the third at the same site; in 1845 "Prescott's Crossing" was built as a timber beam bridge, 1860 saw it replaced with a four span, trussed timber bridge and 5 December 1885 with a 38-metre-long (126 ft), 10-metre-wide (34 ft) truss arch bridge. Carries Hackney Road (A21)	
Adelaide	Torrens River Park Pedestrian Bridge		Located east of the zoo, the bridge was opened in late 2009 and is well patronised by cyclists.	
Adelaide	Albert Bridge		Located adjacent to the Adelaide Zoo, the bridge carries Frome Road over the river. A timber bridge was constructed in 1859, west of the current bridge, and named the Old Frome Bridge. The current bridge was named after Prince Albert, royal consort to Queen Victoria, on 7 May 1879. The wrought iron structure is made from three parallel, scalloped girders that were manufactured in England. It is 36.6 metres (120 ft) long with a cantilevered span of 18 metres (60 ft). The bridge is 13 metres (43 ft) wide and originally had a timber deck, which was replaced with concrete in 1922. The coats of arms on the inside of the bridge contains the city's motto, Ut Prosint Omnibus Conjuncti which translates as "united for the common good." The bridge is listed on the "City of Adelaide Heritage Register", the "South Australian Heritage Register" and the "Register of the National Estate". A complete restoration was finished in 1982, with the bridge now appearing as it did at the 1879 opening.	
Adelaide	University Footbridge		The footbridge connects Victoria Drive, at the rear of University of Adelaide, with University Oval, War Memorial Drive. The bridge was conceived in 1928 by an engineering undergraduate at the university and funded with a £26,000 grant from Adelaide City Council. It was designed by university staff under the supervision of Robert Chapman, chief engineer of the South Australian Railways. Construction was delayed until 1937 due to the economic effects of the Great Depression. The bridge has an arch spanning 46 metres (152 ft), 6.1 metres (20 ft) over the river, and was the first welded bridge in South Australia. A murder that occurred in the vicinity of the bridge on 10 May 1972 resulted in calls to reform South Australia's laws regarding homosexuality. University of Adelaide law lecturer Dr George Duncan was thrown into the river. A plaque on the bridge commemorates his death and the subsequent decriminalisation of homosexuality in South Australia.	
Adelaide	City Bridge		The English manufactured, iron bridge was opened in June 1856, extending King William Street to North Adelaide. It was widened in 1877 then converted into a two-lane bridge in 1884. In 1929 a new wider, concrete bridge was proposed, to be the same width as King William Road and would relieve congestion, particularly on match days at the Adelaide Oval. The bridge was duly replaced in 1931 with the concrete arch structure proposed in 1929. The distinctive lamp fittings and their pylons were designed by South Australian artist John C. Goodchild.	
Adelaide	Adelaide Oval Footbridge			
North Adelaide	Victoria Bridge		The bridge extends from Morphett Street and crosses the rail lines from the Adelaide railway station and the river. The first bridge was opened on 21 June 1871, having been shipped over from Britain on the ship South Australian in 1869. Over time various bridges have been built on the same site. The current bridge, a prestressed concrete box girder bridge, was opened in March 1968 by Premier Don Dunstan, and Adelaide Lord Mayor Walter Lewis Bridgland. The bridge is constructed as two bridges joined to appear continuous. The first spans North Terrace and the rail lines, and the second the river. The bridge was designed without a central pillar in the river, allowing three lanes of rowers to compete without interference.	
North Adelaide	Railway Bridge		Built in 1856 to carry the Port and Gawler railway lines. The bridge was constructed 1.5 kilometres (0.9 mi) from Adelaide railway station.	
Thebarton	Hindmarsh Bridge		Carries Port Road (A21)	
Hindmarsh	Sir William Goodman Bridge		The Sir William Goodman Bridge, originally never named, formed the link for the Thebarton-Hindmarsh tramway, crossing the River Torrens at Holland Street, Thebarton to an intersection of Adam and Manton Streets, Hindmarsh. The bridge was built in 1909 and used by Municipal Tramways Trust trams until 1953. Buses exclusively used the bridge until 1962, when it was used by general road traffic. The bridge was closed off in 1990 due to the age and unsafe nature of the structure. In 2014, the bridge was completely restored and reopened for pedestrian and cycle traffic. It is notable as being the first reinforced concrete bridge constructed in Adelaide. On its reopening, it was named the Sir William Goodman Bridge after the first Chief Engineer and General Manager of the MTT.	
Thebarton	Taylors Bridge		Carries South Road (A13)	
Torrensville			Carries McDonnell Avenue	
Underdale	Holbrooks Bridge		Carries Holbrooks Road (A14)	
Flinders Park	Keele Bridge		Carries Rowells Road (south)/Findon Road (north)	
Lockleys	Kidman Bridge		Carries Henley Beach Road	
Fulham, & West Beach	Davis Bridge		Carries Tapleys Hill Road	
West Beach & Henley Beach South	Seaview Road Bridge		Carries Seaview Road	

== Flora and fauna ==
The river was formerly a food source with yabbies, mussels and small fish, however the reduction in water quality, changing of the river's habitat, and introduction of European fish species has led to a reduction in fauna quantity and diversity. Exotic pest species such as the European carp, redfin perch and trout have greatly reduced native fish populations like the big headed gudgeon (Philypnodon grandiceps) but native waterfowl are common along the river with Pacific black ducks, Australian wood ducks, black swans, ibis, egrets and herons amongst the more than 100 species seen. The number of exotic waterfowl species such as mallards has reduced in recent years. In places the steep banks of the river are an ideal habitat for long-necked tortoises.

The river, and its tributaries, had a population of water rats (Hydromys chrysogaster) and Australian swamp rats (Rattus lutreolus). Water rats remain in reduced numbers, but the introduced black rat (Rattus rattus) and brown rat (Rattus norvegicus) have largely supplanted the natives. The house mouse (Mus musculus) is now the most common mammal of the Torrens environ.

Widely found native reeds, sedges and rushes along the upper river are bulrush, knobby club rush, spike rush, common reed, sea rush and pale rush. River red gum (Eucalyptus camaldulensis) and blue gum (Eucalyptus leucoxylon) trees are found along the riverbanks, although sparser than the forest that was seen by European discoverers. Still present are many of the original vegetation species like Sheoak (Casuarina stricta), native cherry (Exocarpos cupressiformis), native pine (Callitris preissii) and Australia's floral emblem the golden wattle (Acacia pycnantha).

== Today's river ==
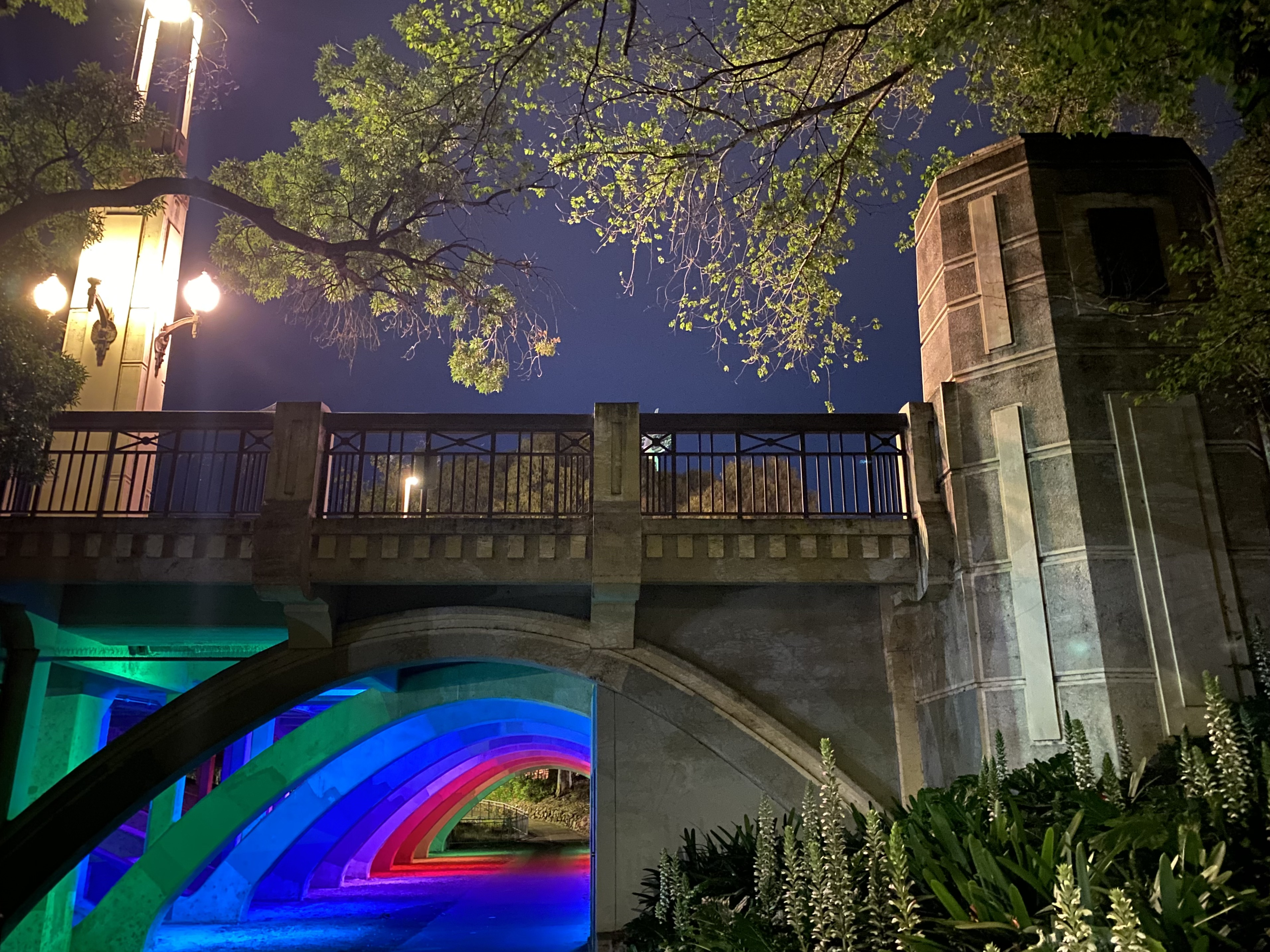
City Bridge

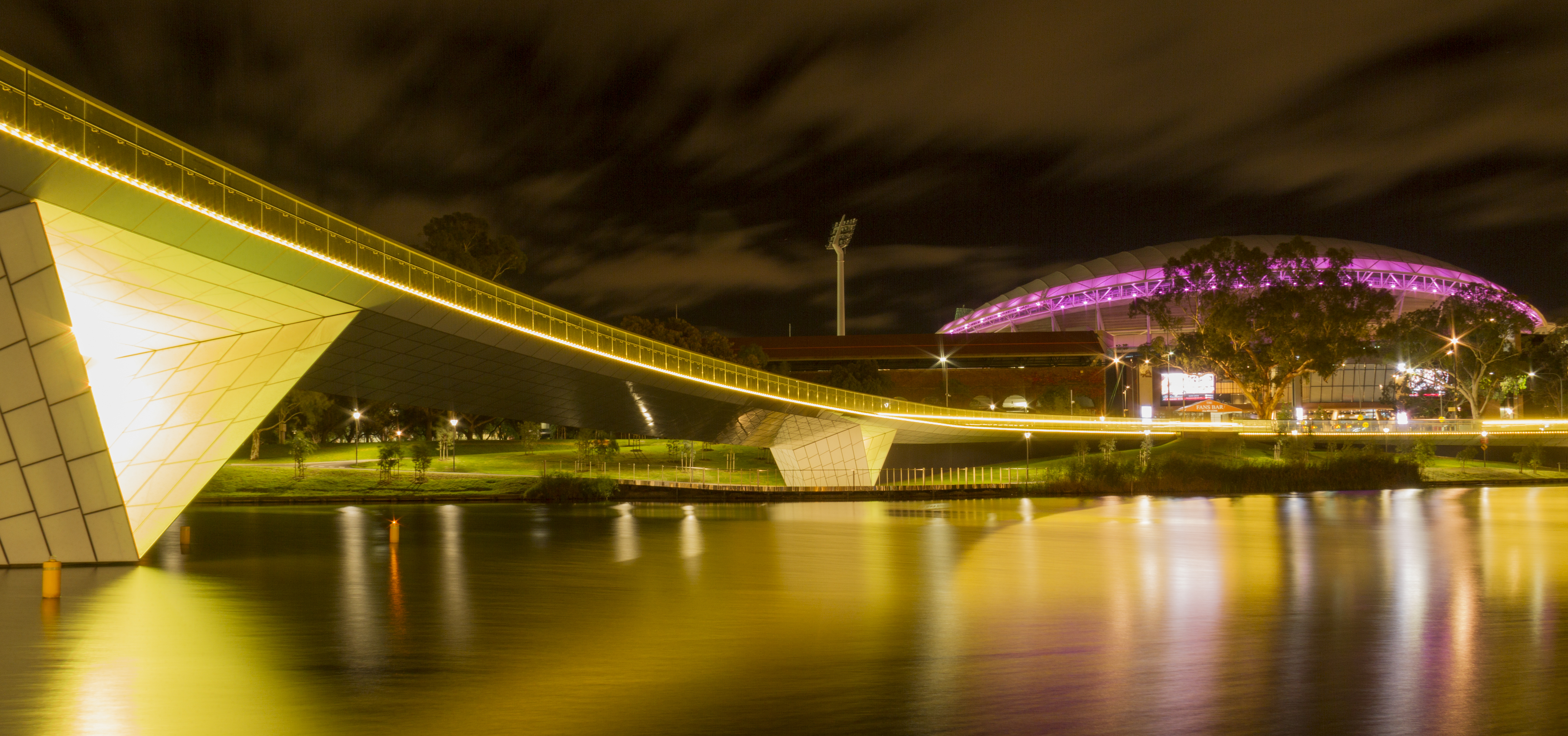
Adelaide Oval Footbridge over the Torrens

From its source the river flows westwards through Birdwood and Gumeracha. It then continues down through Torrens Gorge entering suburban Adelaide at Athelstone with some of its path paralleled by the O-Bahn Busway. It passes between the city centre and North Adelaide, forming the Torrens Lake between the Adelaide Zoo and a weir opposite Adelaide Gaol. The river then continues the remaining eight kilometres to the sea at Henley Beach South, emptying into Gulf St Vincent via a constructed outlet.

Hope Valley, Millbrook and Kangaroo Creek Reservoirs, which provide water storage for Adelaide, capture the river's flow. These reservoirs form part of the Adelaide Hills catchment, which supplies 60% of Adelaide's water needs in an average year. Adelaide City Council uses water from the lower river to irrigate the city's surrounding parklands. Rubbish accumulation in the lower river is controlled with numerous collection racks, and sediments and other pollutants are filtered through constructed wetlands.

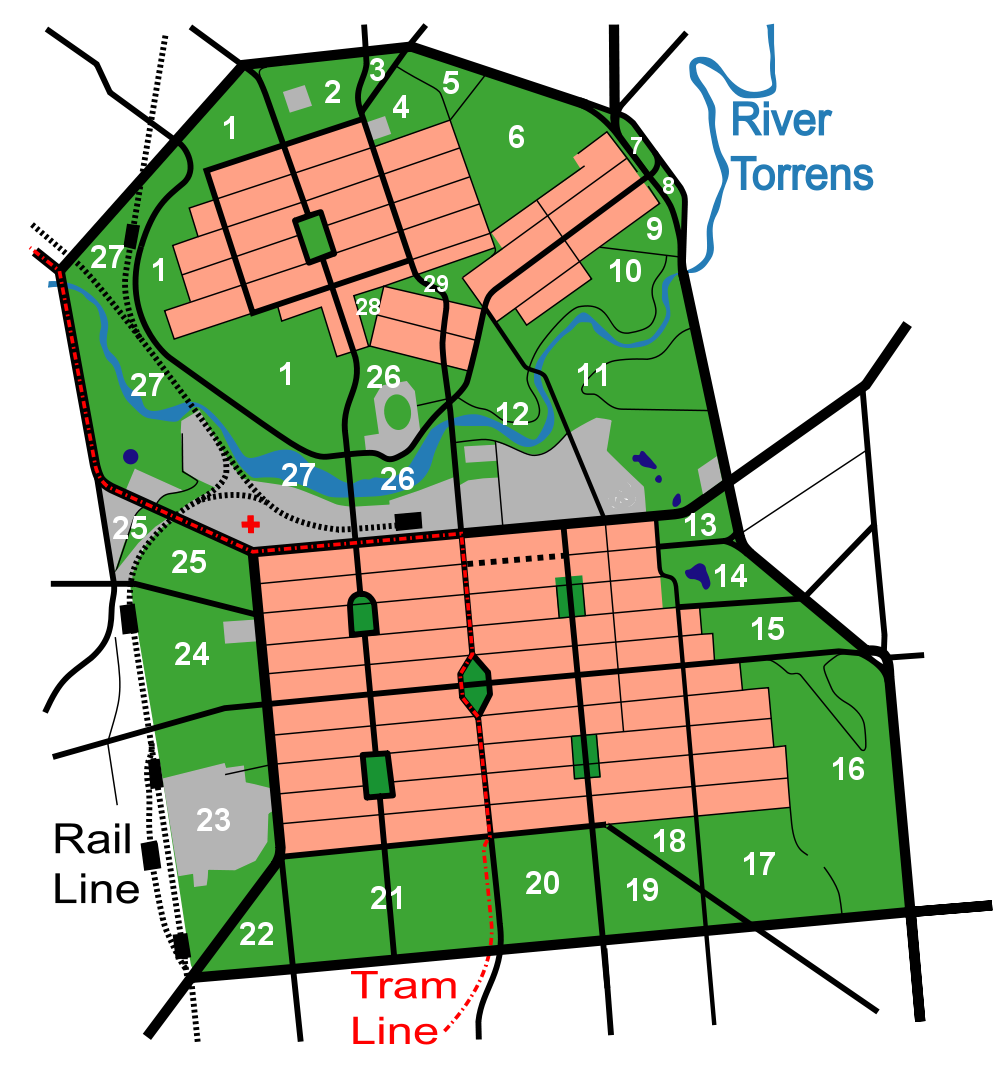
The river's path flowing between Adelaide and North Adelaide, through Adelaide's parklands

The earliest linear river park in Australia bounds the suburban end of the river. The park is 35 km long with numerous playgrounds walkways and bicycle tracks. On the south bank of the lake, adjacent to the Adelaide Festival Centre, Elder Park is used for the annual Tasting Australia festival, mass singing of christmas carols at the annual "Carols by Candlelight", and other public events throughout the year. The Popeye tourist boats, small paddle boats and Black Swans of the lake are icons of the area and frequently featured in postcard photographs of the city. Due to now-limited natural river flow and stormwater born organic material, the lower river, (particularly the lake), is often polluted with algal blooms and significant levels of E. coli bacteria in spring and summer. Numerous taskforces have been formed to improve the river's water quality, including one created in 2006 by the Minister for the Environment and Conservation.

The river is a used by many for recreation, with the footpaths on the riverbanks often filled with cyclists and joggers. Rowers use the lake for training all year round, and many clubs such as the Adelaide University Boat Club, the Adelaide Rowing Club, and the boat houses of the secondary schools which participate in the annual Head of the River are located upon its banks. Several rowing regattas are held on the Torrens Lake course in the summer months of each year, contested by both club and school crews.

== See also ==
- List of rivers of Australia § South Australia
