= Kangaroo Creek Dam =

Dam and reservoir in South Australia

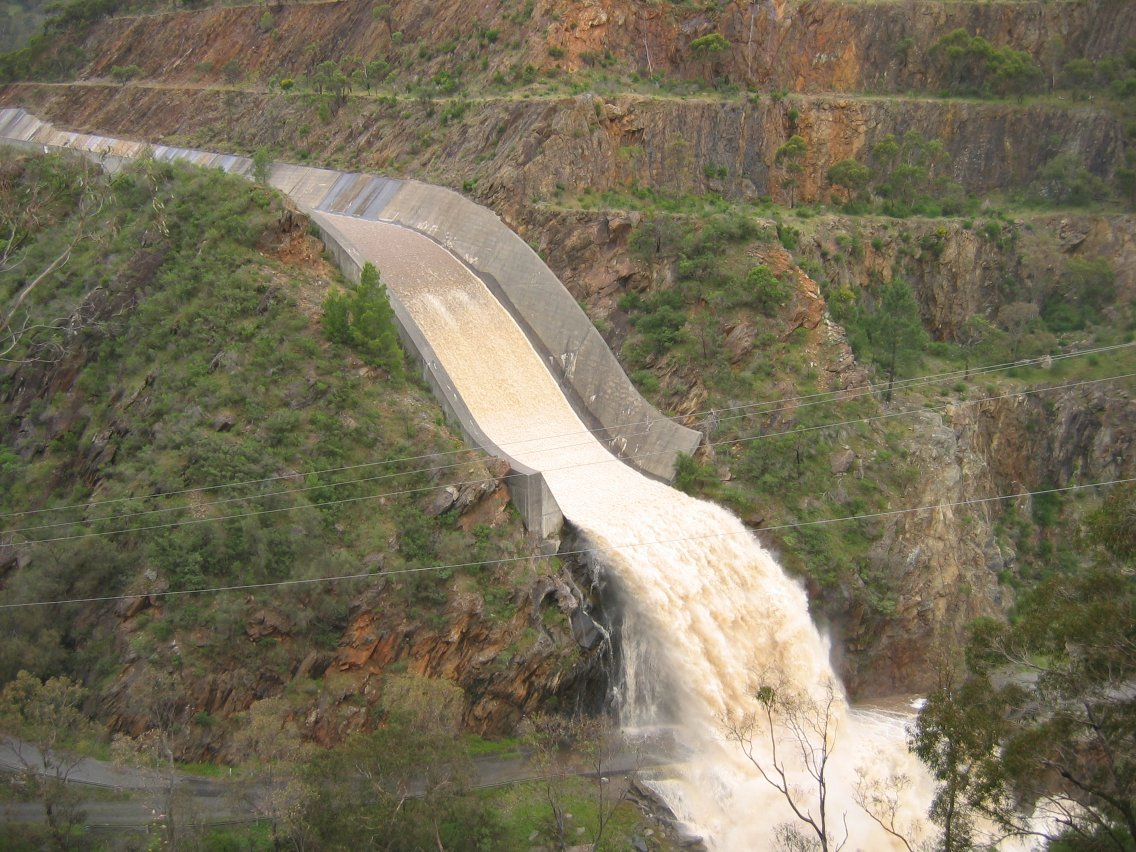
- The dam spillway overflowing, in 2005

- Location of the dam in South Australia
- Interactive map of Kangaroo Creek Dam
- Country: Australia
- Location: South Australia
- Coordinates: 34°51′55″S 138°46′25″E
- Purpose: Water supply; Flood mitigation
- Status: Operational
- Construction began: 1966
- Opening date: 1969
- Owner: Government of South Australia
- Operator: SA Water

Dam and spillways
- Type of dam: Rock-fill dam
- Impounds: River Torrens; Kangaroo Creek
- Height (foundation): 64 m (210 ft)
- Length: 131 m (430 ft)
- Dam volume: 353×10^{3} m^{3} (12.5×10^{6} cu ft)
- Spillway type: Uncontrolled
- Spillway capacity: 1,845 m^{3}/s (65,200 cu ft/s)

Reservoir
- Creates: Kangaroo Creek Reservoir
- Total capacity: 19.16 GL (15,530 acre⋅ft)
- Catchment area: 290 km^{2} (110 sq mi)
- Surface area: 103 ha (250 acres)
- Normal elevation: 240 m (790 ft) AHD

The Kangaroo Creek Dam is a rock-fill embankment dam across the River Torrens, in the Adelaide Hills of South Australia. Completed in 1969, the resultant reservoir, the Kangaroo Creek Reservoir, was established for the purposes of supplying potable water and flood mitigation.

== Overview ==
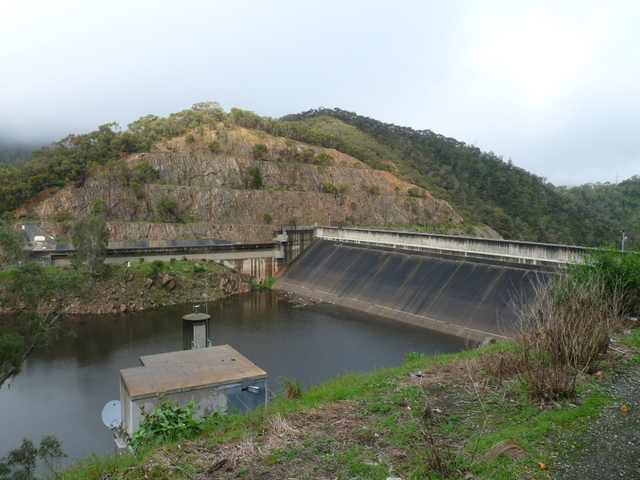
The dam wall in 2009

Built from 1966 to 1969, by damming the River Torrens west of the locality of Cudlee Creek, the earth and rock-filled dam wall is 64 metres (210 ft) high and 131 metres (430 ft) long. When full, the reservoir has capacity of 19.16 gigalitres (15,530 acre⋅ft) and cover a surface area of 103 hectares (250 acres), drawn from a catchment area of 290 square kilometres (110 sq mi). The uncontrolled spillway has a flow capacity of 1,845 cubic metres per second (65,200 cu ft/s). The stored water is used to maintain the water level in the Hope Valley Reservoir via discharge through the Torrens.

Between 2016 and December 2019, changes were made to the dam wall and the spillway. As a result of draining the dam, the historic Batchelor's Bridge once again became visible. The dam again reached capacity on 26 October 2022.

The dam and reservoir are named after Kangaroo Creek, a tributary of the Torrens which enters the reservoir on its southern side.

== See also ==
- List of reservoirs and dams in South Australia
