= John England (engineer) =

British civil engineer

John England MICE (1822 – 14 September 1877) was a British civil engineer prominent in the history of the Colony of South Australia.

== History ==
John England junior, as he was generally known, was the second son of John England, a prominent solicitor of Hull, Yorkshire. He was educated at the local High School and was articled to the eminent engineer (later Sir) William Fairbairn. On gaining his degree, he was put in charge of design and construction of engines for the HMSS Megara and her sister ship. When Fairbairn was commissioned by Brunel to design girders for the Menai Bridge, England and a Mr. Murray were charged with investigating various tubular forms and constricting a one-fourth scale model of the bridge to test its breaking strain. His work drew the attention of Charles Vignoles, who then employed England to supervise construction of the suspension bridge over the Dnieper at Kiev, a job which took five years, from 1842 to 1847. In recognition of his work he was offered the post of Captain in the Imperial Engineer Corps, but his health had suffered from the cold climate, and he decided to move to South Australia.

He arrived in Adelaide in 1851, and after a brief sojourn in Melbourne, he set up a contracting business in Adelaide, and after constructing a number of wooden bridges, submitted a design for a tubular steel bridge over the Torrens, together with a plan for extending King William Street (as King William Road) to North Adelaide. He and William Robson Coulthard erected the Glenelg jetty, the first screw-pile structure in Australia. He was appointed City Surveyor, but resigned that position to take over the Adelaide Waterworks on the retirement of George Ernest Hamilton in 1858 and the amalgamation of that position with that of Resident Engineer of South Australian Railways. He supervised construction of the Thorndon Park reservoir and its reticulation. He was instrumental in the erection of the Port Adelaide lighthouse and upgrading the Troubridge lighthouse.

He left the Public Service in 1867 after a Select Committee found he had authorized over-payment to the Thorndon Park contractor, and joined the firm of Wallace and Morel, who were laying the railway north from Port Augusta. This project was abandoned, and England left for Japan, where he had been appointed Chief Engineer of the Japanese Imperial Railways. He died in Tokyo.
