= Hope Valley Dam =

Dam and reservoir in Adelaide, South Australia

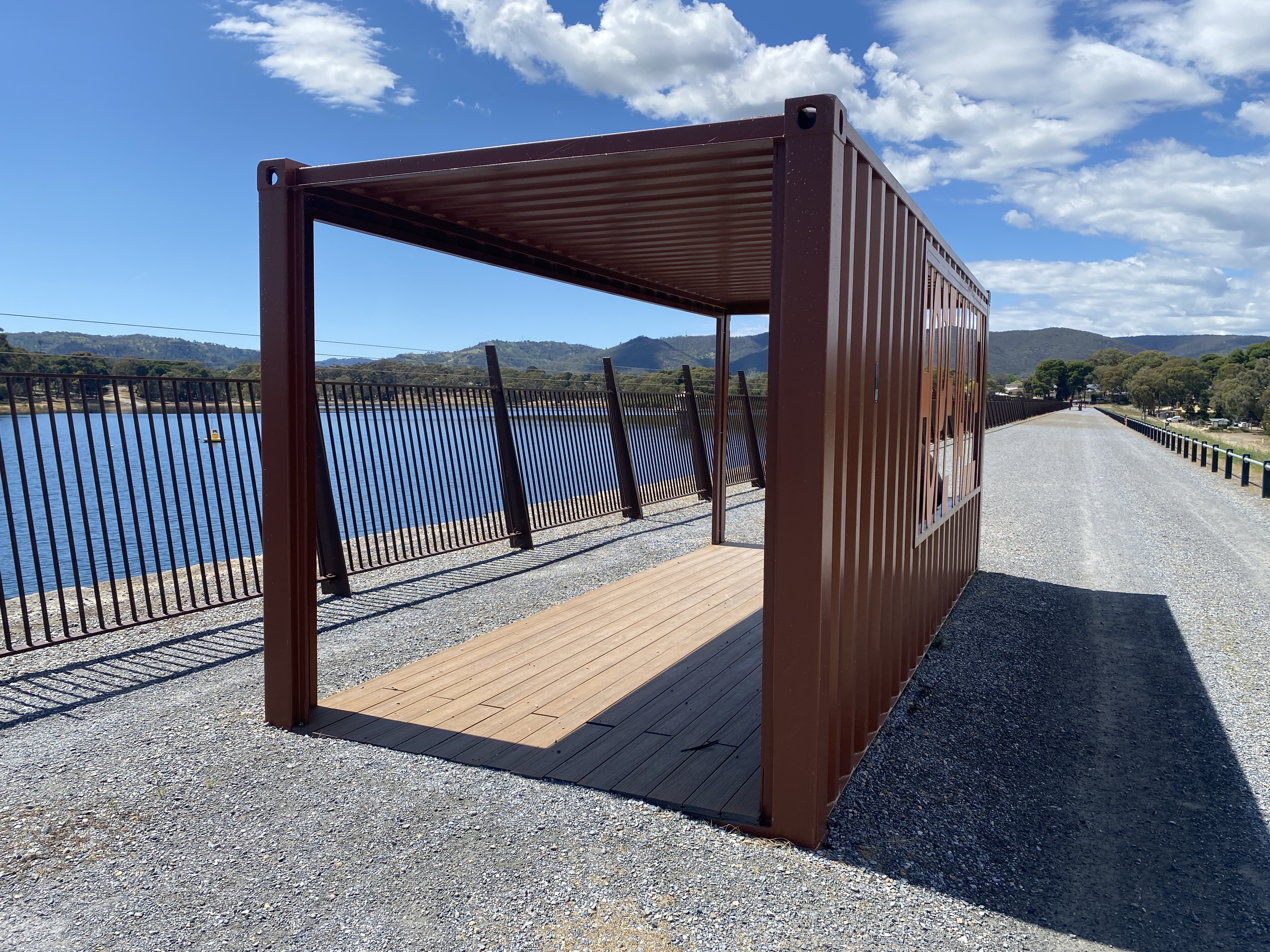
- A shelter on the dam wall, 2025

- Location within Greater Adelaide
- Interactive map of Hope Valley Dam
- Country: Australia
- Location: Adelaide, South Australia
- Coordinates: 34°51′14″S 138°40′53″E
- Purpose: Water supply
- Status: Operational
- Opening date: 1873
- Built by: G & RE Fry
- Owner: Government of South Australia
- Operator: SA Water

Dam and spillways
- Type of dam: Earth fill dam
- Impounds: Off-stream
- Height (foundation): 22 m (72 ft)
- Length: 765 m (2,510 ft)
- Dam volume: 236×10^{3} m^{3} (8.3×10^{6} cu ft)
- Spillway type: Uncontrolled
- Spillway capacity: 5 m^{3}/s (180 cu ft/s)

Reservoir
- Creates: Hope Valley Reservoir
- Total capacity: 3.63 GL (2,940 acre⋅ft)
- Active capacity: 2.84 GL (2,300 acre⋅ft)
- Catchment area: 3 km^{2} (1.2 sq mi)
- Surface area: 60.3 ha (149 acres)
- Normal elevation: 102 m (335 ft) AHD

The Hope Valley Dam is an off-stream earth-filled embankment dam, located in Hope Valley, a suburb of Adelaide, South Australia. Completed in 1873, the resultant reservoir, the Hope Valley Reservoir, was established to supply potable water for the city of Adelaide.

== Overview ==
When completed in 1873, it became the second reservoir constructed in Adelaide and remains the oldest still in use in South Australia.

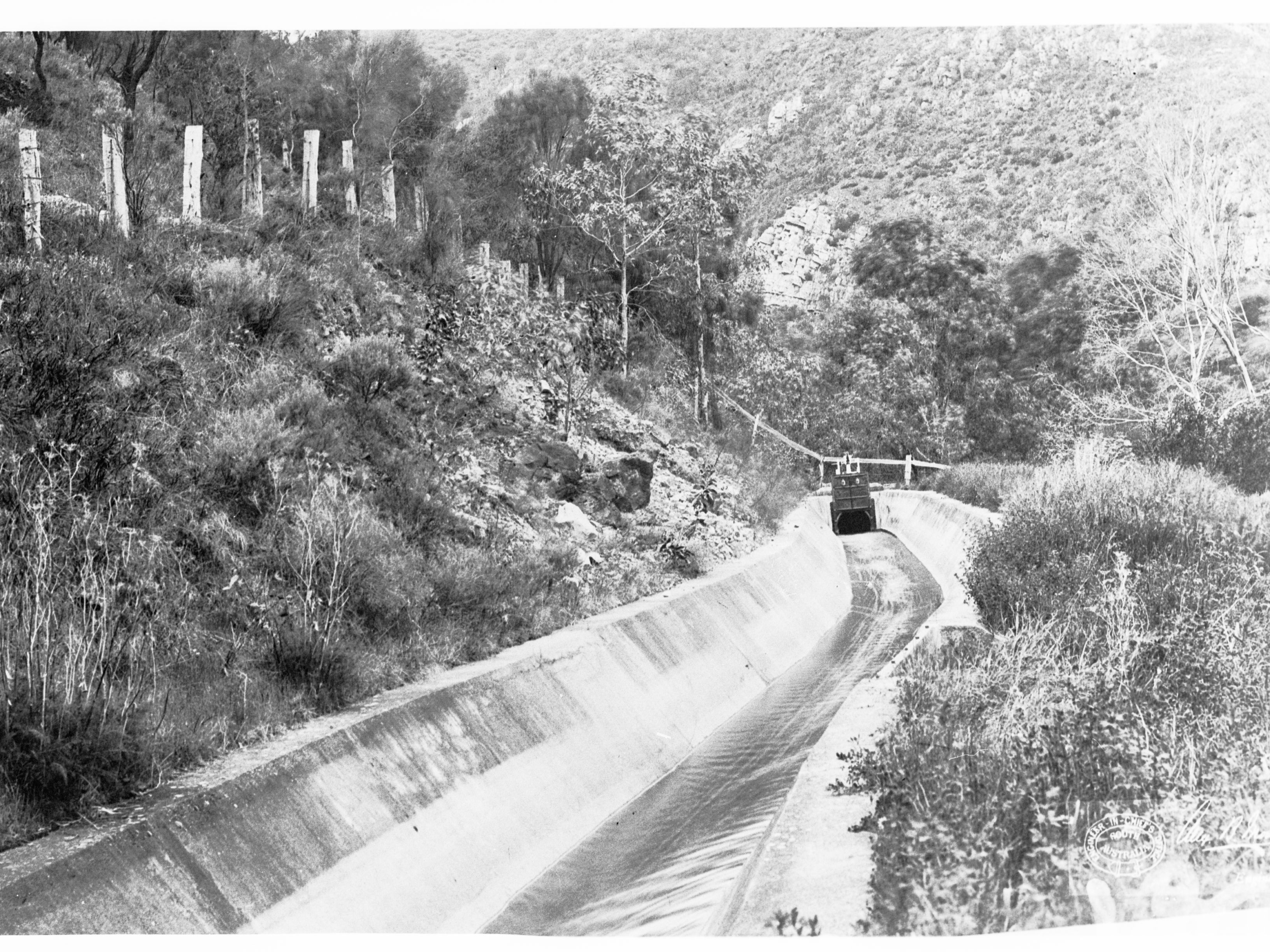
The off-stream channel which connects the Millbrook Reservoir with the Hope Valley Reservoir, 1920

The earth-filled dam wall is 22 metres (72 ft) high and 765 metres (2,510 ft) long. When full, the reservoir has capacity of 3,630 megalitres (2,940 acre⋅ft) and covers 60.3 hectares (149 acres), drawn from a relatively-small catchment area of 3 square kilometres (1.2 sq mi). The uncontrolled spillway has a flow capacity of 5 cubic metres per second (180 cu ft/s).

The reservoir is fed by water transferred from the River Torrens via a tunnel and aqueduct. The river is also used to transfer water from the Kangaroo Creek and Millbrook reservoirs.

In December 2020, the reservoir was opened to the public for the first time for activities including walking, running, cycling and picnicking.

== See also ==
- List of reservoirs and dams in South Australia
