= Millbrook Dam =

Dam and reservoir in Adelaide, South Australia

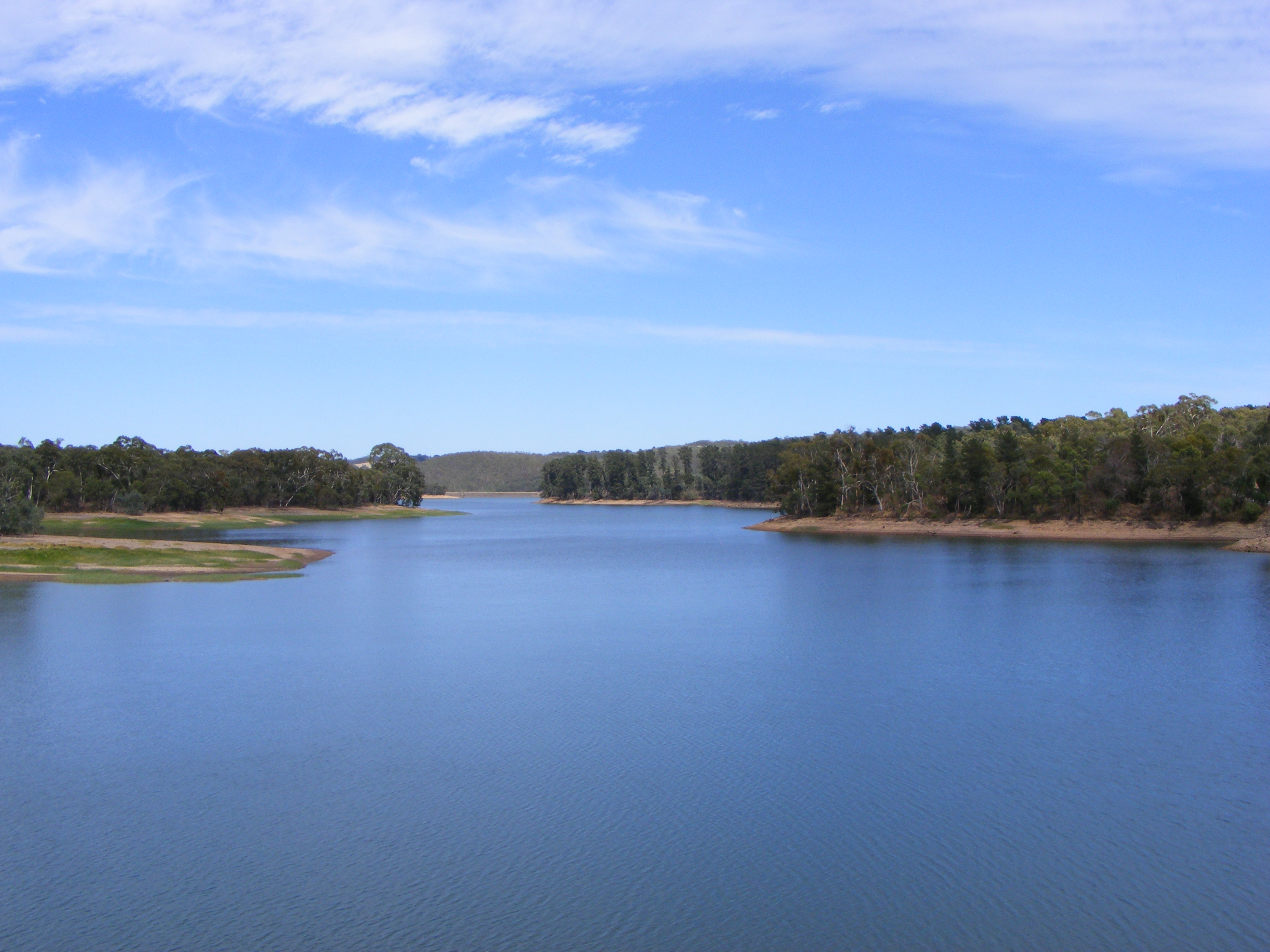
- The eastern part of the reservoir in 2007

- Location of the dam in South Australia
- Interactive map of Millbrook Dam
- Country: Australia
- Location: Adelaide, South Australia
- Coordinates: 34°49′59″S 138°48′31″E
- Purpose: Water supply
- Status: Operational
- Construction began: 1914
- Opening date: 1918
- Owner: Government of South Australia
- Operator: SA Water

Dam and spillways
- Type of dam: Earth fill dam
- Impounds: Off-stream
- Height (foundation): 32 m (105 ft)
- Length: 288 m (945 ft)
- Dam volume: 282×10^{3} m^{3} (10.0×10^{6} cu ft)
- Spillway type: Uncontrolled
- Spillway capacity: 340 m^{3}/s (12,000 cu ft/s)

Reservoir
- Creates: Millbrook Reservoir
- Total capacity: 16.5 GL (13,400 acre⋅ft)
- Catchment area: 38 km^{2} (15 sq mi)
- Surface area: 178 ha (440 acres)
- Normal elevation: 301 m (988 ft) AHD

The Millbrook Dam is an off-stream earth-filled embankment dam, in the Adelaide Hills, South Australia. Completed in 1918, the resultant reservoir, the Millbrook Reservoir, was built to supply potable water to Adelaide's eastern suburbs and to control water flows in the upper River Torrens. The dam and reservoir were named after the small town of Millbrook, (Note: John Tippett named the town of Millbrook in the late 19th century after Millbrook in his native Cornwall.) that was demolished and removed during construction.

== Overview ==
The dam was built from 1914 to 1918 during World War I and provides gravity-fed water to Adelaide. The earth-filled dam wall is 32 metres (105 ft) high and 288 metres (945 ft) long. When full, the reservoir has capacity of 16.5 gigalitres (13,400 acre⋅ft) and covers a surface area of 178 hectares (440 acres), drawn from a catchment area of 38 square kilometres (15 sq mi). The uncontrolled spillway has a flow capacity of 340 cubic metres per second (12,000 cu ft/s).

During the 1970s, the nearby town of Chain of Ponds was also removed to prevent pollution of the reservoir's water. The dam lies adjacent to the Chain of Ponds Creek, a tributary of the River Torrens. Water in the reservoir is piped from a weir near Gumeracha but it is also used to balance storage of River Murray water via the Mannum–Adelaide pipeline. It also captures approximately half of the Torrens' water flow.

== Gallery ==
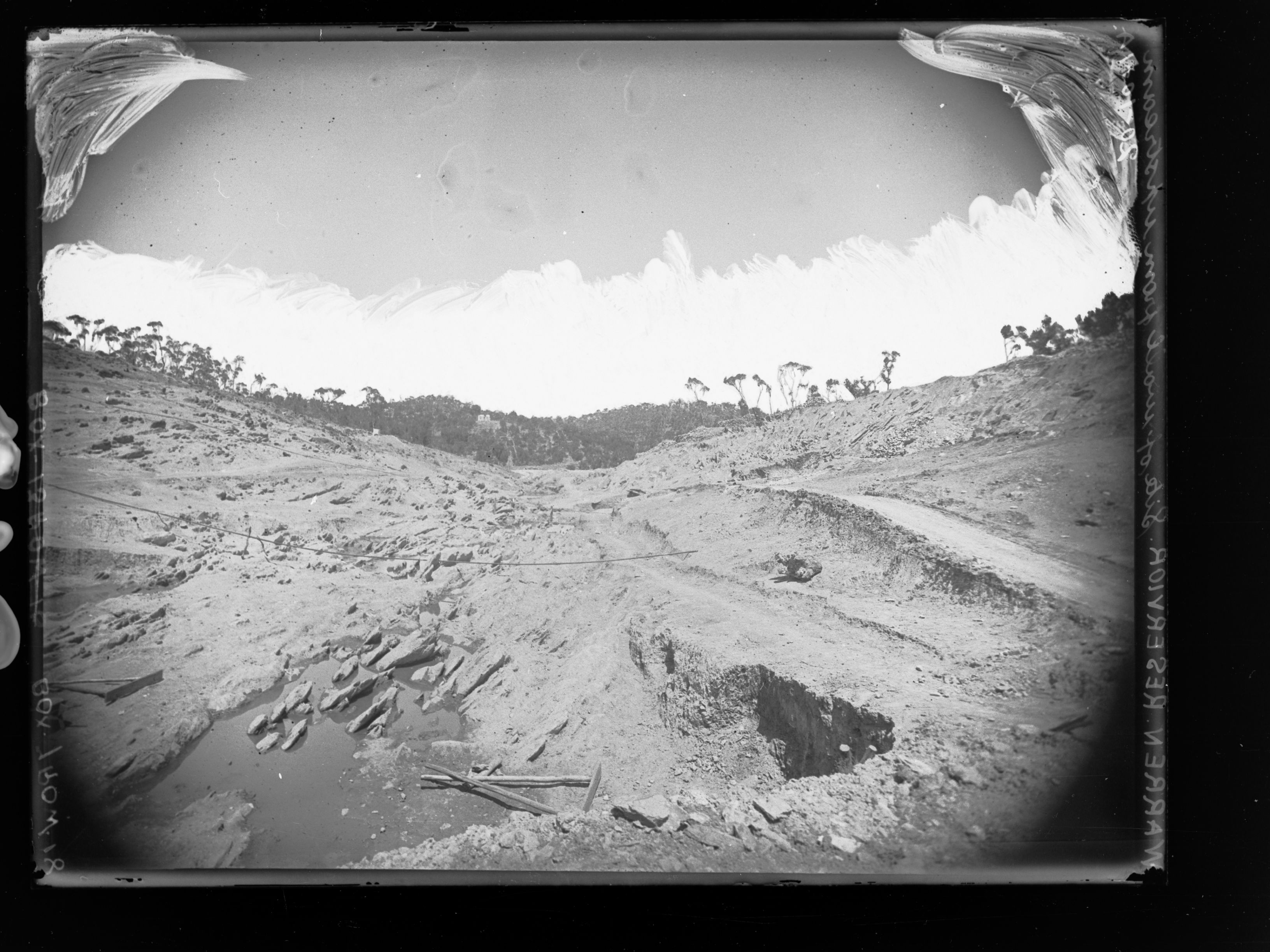
Dam wall under construction, 1914

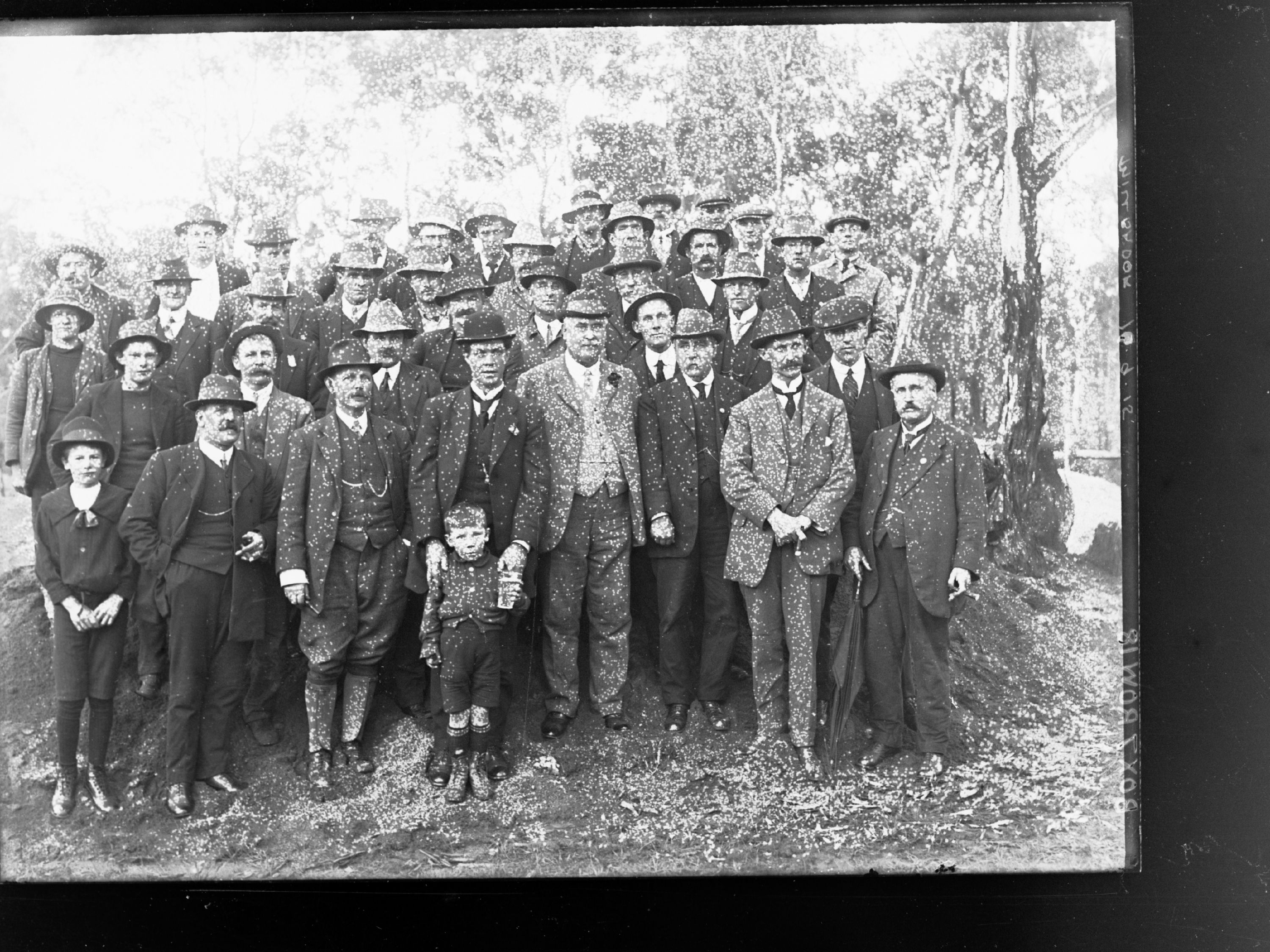
Dam construction workers, 1915

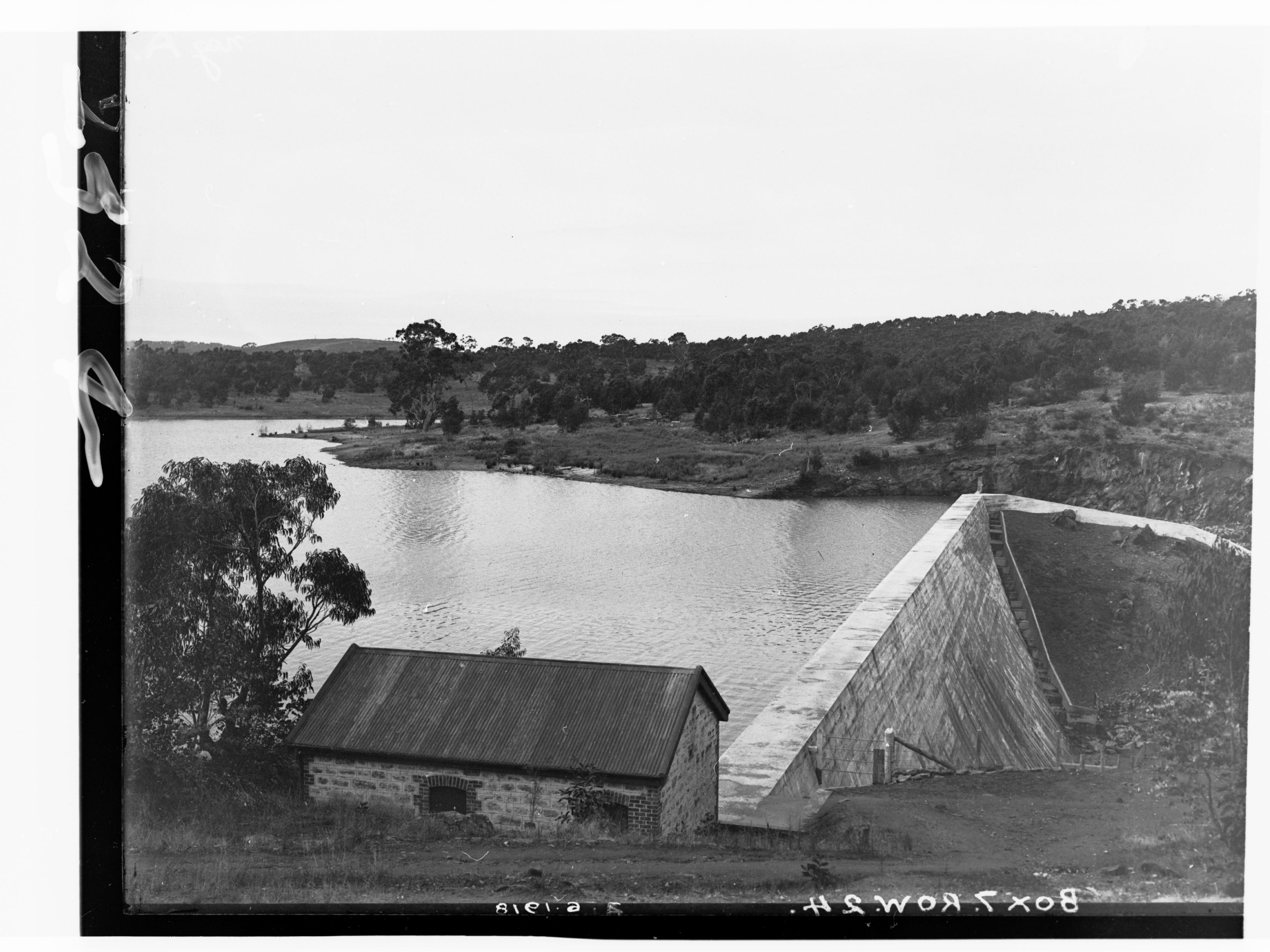
Dam wall, 1918

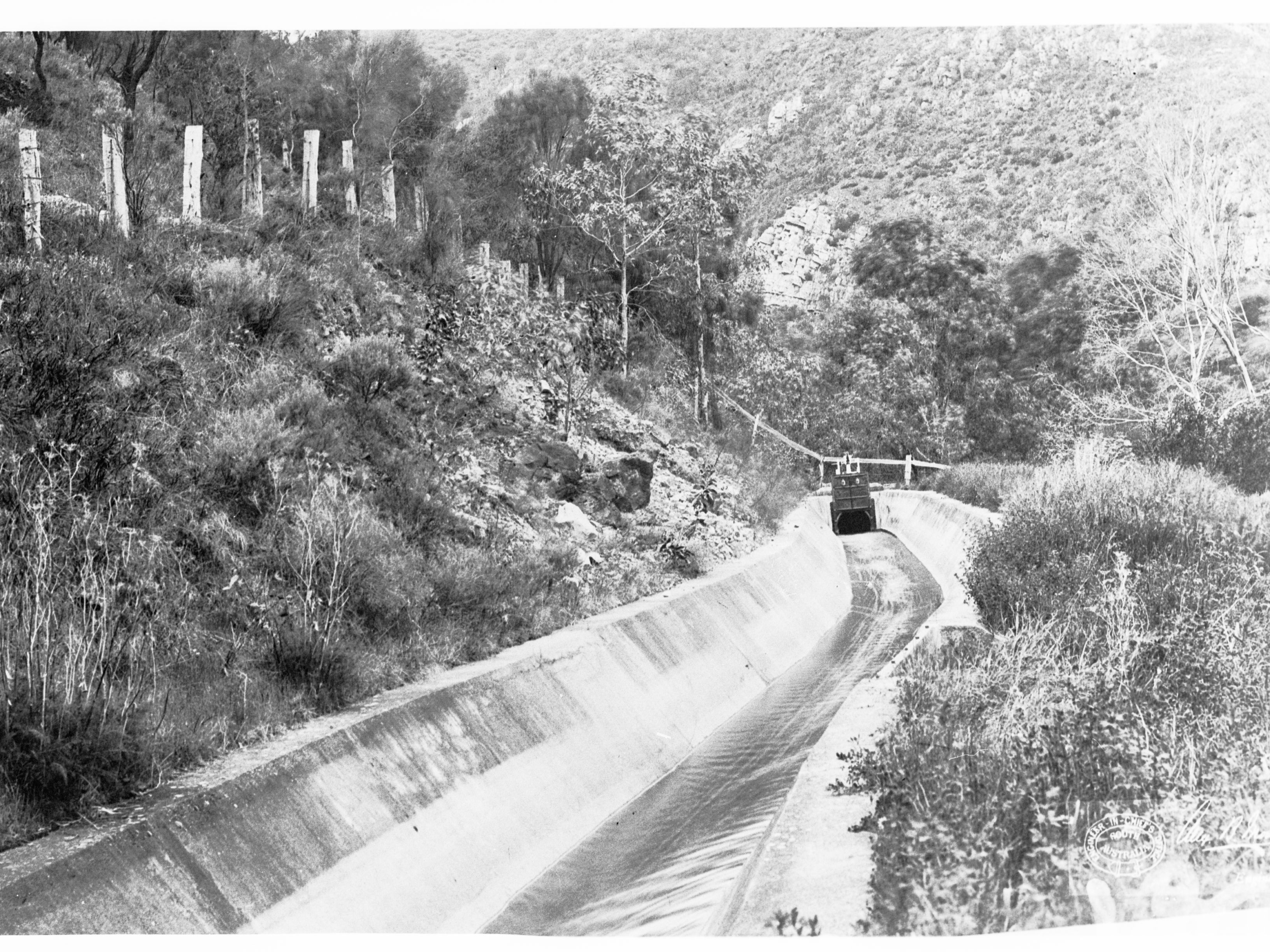
The off-stream channel which connects the Millbrook Reservoir with the Hope Valley Reservoir, 1920

== See also ==
- List of reservoirs and dams in South Australia
