= George Ernest Hamilton =

Australian civil engineer

George Ernest Hamilton CE (ca.1800 – 8 October 1872) was a British civil engineer who played a leading role in development of the Colony of South Australia.

== History ==
He was involved in various water supply schemes in England between 1826 and 1840: including works at Shrewsbury, Chesterfield and Wolverhampton, and a slipway for the Port of Caernarvon. He was also associated with the early development of railways, having been one of George Stephenson's coadjutors on the Liverpool and Manchester Railway, and was described as having been connected with the railway system from its beginning, later working on railways in various parts of the world.

He arrived in South Australia in 1850 and was appointed as a member of the first Adelaide City Council, then in 1853 the first Town of Kensington and Norwood council. He was an early advocate of steam navigation of the River Murray. He put forward a plan for a reservoir on the Torrens Gorge and was appointed Superintendent of the Mechanical Department of the SA Assay office under B. H. Babbage, then Assistant Engineer for the Port Adelaide railway in 1853 and Inspector General of Roads in 1854 and Inspector of Main Roads in 1855.

He was Chief Engineer for the Waterworks Department 1857–1858, and responsible for the Torrens Gorge weir near Campbelltown which failed in July 1858, its first year of operation. Hamilton was called as a witness in 1859 when it was discovered that the contractors Frost & Watson had skimped on materials for the dam wall, but came in for a share of the blame and resigned, to be replaced by John England. The partnership of (Thomas) Frost and (Edward) Watson was dissolved in 1860.

He was involved in designing the smelters at Port Adelaide and Wallaroo in 1860. He was appointed engineer for construction of the Strathalbyn and Victor Harbor tramway in 1866 and Resident Engineer for the Strathalbyn to Middleton tramway in 1867. He was appointed JP in 1862.

He and his son, architect Edward Angus Hamilton, were involved in constructing the Kadina to Wallaroo railway, completed in 1866. Their partnership was dissolved in 1866 when George was appointed to the Strathalbyn and Middleton Railway and E. A. Hamilton to the firm of Wright & Woods, (then in 1868 second-in-charge of the Colonial Architect's Department, MLA for Kadina 1870–1871 and later moved to South America).

He was a member of a consortium that was formed in 1870 to lay a railway between Port Adelaide and Holdfast Bay.

He returned to Britain and died at Abergavenny, Monmouthshire, aged 73

== Personal ==
Hamilton was married to Eliza, who died on 12 December 1858 aged 58 at their home "The Lodge", Kensington.
