= Rosslyn Park, South Australia =

Rosslyn Park
- Suburb
- Dr Christopher Rawson Penfold Reserve

- Country: Australia
- State: South Australia
- LGA: City of Burnside
- Location: 6 km (3.7 mi) from Adelaide city centre
- Established: 1844

Government
  - State electorate: Bragg
  - Federal division: Sturt

Population
  - Total: 1,469 (SAL 2021)
- Postcode: 5072
Suburbs around Rosslyn Park
Tranmere	Magill	Woodforde
Kensington Gardens	Rosslyn Park	Auldana
Erindale	Wattle Park	Skye

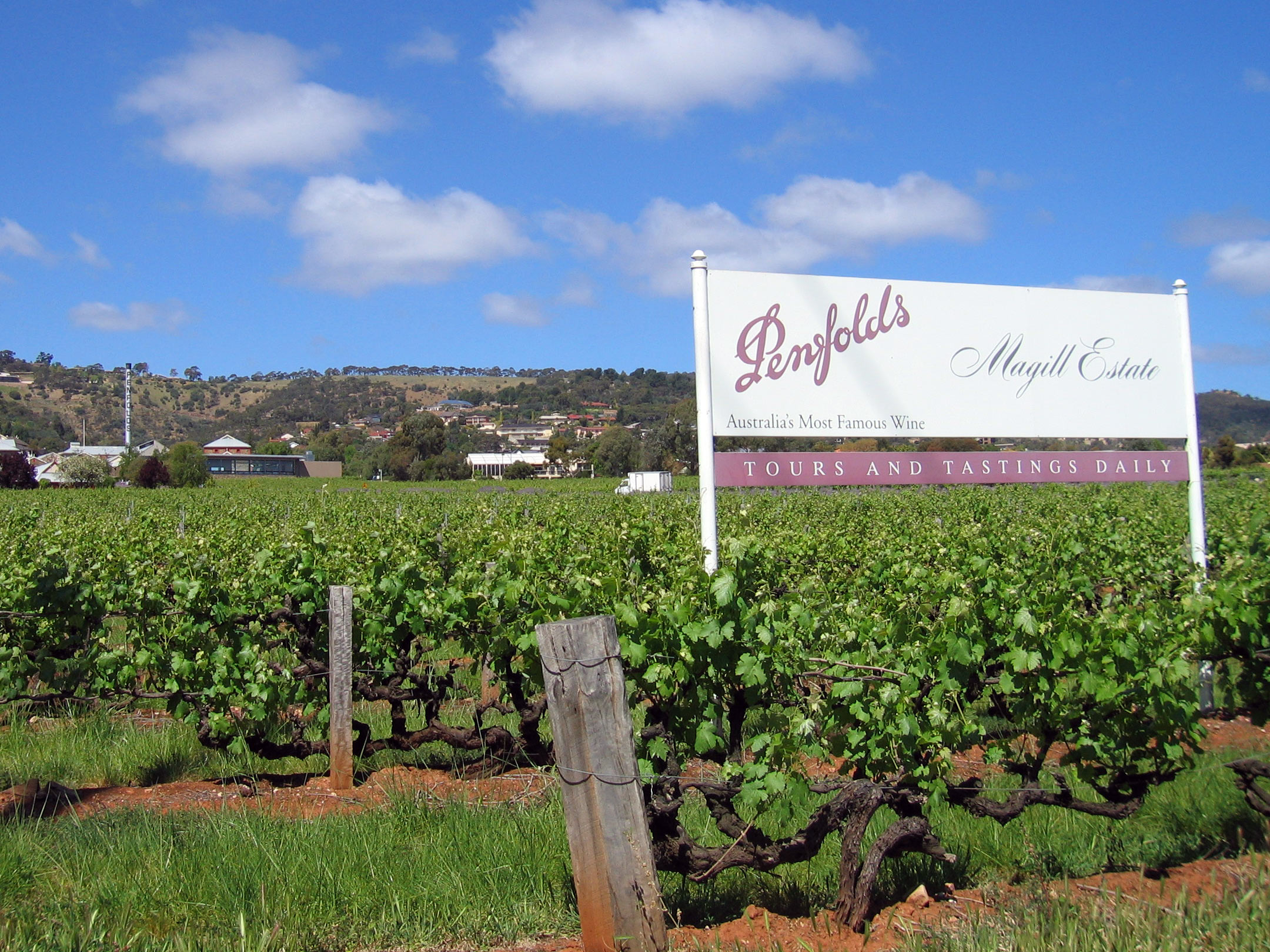
Penfolds Magill Estate

Rosslyn Park is an eastern suburb of Adelaide in the City of Burnside.

== History ==
=== Dr Penfold ===
Most of Rosslyn Park started life as paddocks belonging to Dr Christopher Rawson Penfold, of Penfolds Wine. Dr Penfold was an English emigrant who purchased 500 acres (200 ha) of land in the area in 1844. Here he planted vines and established Penfolds as one of the leading winemakers in Australia. He and subsequent generations of his family resided at the Grange Cottage, to the east of Penfold Road.

Dr Penfold became the first chairman of the District Council of Burnside in 1856.

=== Sub-division ===
Upon Dr Penfold's death in 1870, his son-in-law, Thomas Hyland, assumed control of the business, and began to sell some of the land.

The area of Rosslyn Park to the west of Gordon Terrace, between Kensington Road and The Parade, was sold in 1877 to a syndicate made up of:

- James Gartrell, merchant, partner in G. Wood, Son & Co.
- Thomas Gordon, accountant
- William Taylor, draper
- Alexander McGeorge, draper
- David Tweedy, land agent

The syndicate subdivided the land, and sold parcels of it the next year.

Wine production declined at the Rosslyn Park site in the 20th century as production shifted to other areas in South Australia. The last vintage of Penfolds Wine was crushed at Magill Estate in 1972. Prior to and following this, subdivision of the land surrounding Magill Estate continued.

The area bounded by Penfold Road, Park Avenue, Edgcumbe Terrace and The Parade was formerly the site of Joseph Gillard Jnr's (manager at the Grange vineyard) main vineyard. It was sold and subdivided by the Penfolds in around 1912.

The area around Angove Court and Edgcumbe Terrace contains the former family home of Dr Roger Angove, inaugural President of the Burnside Historical Society. This land was subdivided in 1960. The family stables remained until they were demolished by a landowner in 1970.

A larger subdivision occurred in the early 1980s, when owners Tooth & Co sold much of the area to the east of Penfold Road, resulting in the survival of only the core of the former winery, including production plants and Grange Cottage.

=== Contemporary events ===
In May 2002, Rosslyn Park experienced an incidence of freak weather when a tornado passed through it and Wattle Park late in the morning. The tornado cut a narrow, 2 km long path of destruction through the suburbs, tearing limbs off trees and tiles from roofs.

== Geography ==
Eucalyptus trees on Edgecumbe Terrace

Rosslyn Park is situated approximately 6 km east of the Adelaide city centre. It is bounded by The Parade to the north, Coach Road to the east, Kensington Road to the south and Hyland Terrace to the west.

The suburb is divided by Penfold Road into two distinct areas. West of Penfold Road, the area is characterised by wide, tree-lined roads and architecture representing many styles popular during the twentieth century. East of Penfold Road, the area is much steeper in its approach to the Adelaide Hills, and contains some large, striking and very modern architecture. Some undeveloped vegetatation, and some of the vines, also remain in this part of the suburb.

=== Land use ===
Land use in Rosslyn Park is primarily residential. Penfolds is a notable exception, with its rows of grapevines along Penfold Road a relic of the area's earlier agricultural focus.

=== Significant places ===
Grange Cottage

By far the most notable landmark in Rosslyn Park is the Magill Estate branch of Penfolds Winery. This site offers cellar door sales, tours and the award-winning Penfolds Magill Estate Restaurant. The winery's chimney is visible throughout the area.

Also located at Magill Estate is the historic Grange Cottage. This was constructed by Dr Penfold and his wife, Mary, in 1845, and named after Mary's home town in England. Grange Hermitage wine was in turn named after the cottage.

Other notable locations in Rosslyn Park include:

- WH Holmes Reserve, situated on Park Avenue.
- Dr Christopher Rawson Penfold Reserve, a small park on the corner of The Parade and Penfold Road. The park contains a collection of winemaking artefacts donated by wineries in the area.
- The Consulate General of Greece, located on Mary Penfold Drive.

=== Street names ===
Entrance to Mary Penfold Drive

Street names in Rosslyn Park reflect the area's viticultural history and the predilections of its subdividers.

- Angove Court: named for Roger Angove, whose former family home is located at the end of the court
- Ayr Street: also the name of a Scottish town, likely originates with the Scottish heritage of members of the syndicate
- Dalwood Court: the name of a range of Penfolds wine
- Edgcumbe Terrace: name of the Angoves' family home
- Gillard Drive: named for Joseph Gillard Jnr, manager of the Penfolds cellars and vineyards 1869–1905
- Gordon Terrace: named for Thomas Gordon, syndicate member
- Grange Avenue: name of the Penfolds' family cottage
- Hyland Terrace: named for Thomas Hyland, son-in-law of Dr Penfold and a key contributor to the winemaker's success
- Inez Court: named for Inez Hyland, granddaughter of Dr Penfold
- Lanark Street: also the name of a Scottish town, probably originates with the syndicate
- Mary Penfold Drive: Mary was Dr Penfold's wife and supervised the development of the company after his death
- Penfold Road: named for Dr Penfold and his wife, Mary
- Rawson Penfold Drive: named for Dr Penfold
- Schubert Court: named for Max Schubert, creator of the Grange Hermitage wine
- Taylor Terrace: named for William Taylor, syndicate member

A bus stop on Penfold Road

== Politics ==
At the Federal level, Rosslyn Park residents are represented in the electorate of Sturt. The member for the seat is currently James Stevens (Australian politician). At the state level, the suburb is split between the electorates of Hartley, currently held by Grace Portolesi MP, and Morialta, currently held by John Gardner MP.

== Transport ==
Rosslyn Park is primarily accessed by car and bus. The main roads leading to the suburb are The Parade, Kensington Road and Penfold Road. The Adelaide Metro bus system services Rosslyn Park, with routes H22 and H20 travelling from Grenfell Street in the city to service the area via the Parade, and routes H23 and 141 servicing the area via Kensington Road. The 141 originates from North Terrace in the city, whilst the H23 follows the routes of H20 and H22 before crossing over to Kensington Road via Portrush Road. Bike lanes also exist most of the way along the Parade into the suburb, whilst the development of a 'bicycle boulevard' on the suburban Beulah Road also promotes bicycle usage in the area.
