= Electoral results for the district of Morialta =

South Australian district election results

This is a list of electoral results for the Electoral district of Morialta in South Australian state elections.

== Members for Morialta ==
Member	Party	Term
Joan Hall	Liberal Party	2002–2006
Lindsay Simmons	Labor Party	2006–2010
John Gardner	Liberal Party	2010–2026

== Election results ==
=== Elections in the 2020s ===
==== 2026 ====
2026 South Australian state election: Morialta
Party	Candidate	Votes	%	±%
Labor	Matthew Marozzi	9,610	40.6	+4.5
Liberal	Scott Kennedy	5,974	25.2	−21.0
One Nation	Peter Ellery	4,343	18.3	+18.3
Greens	Jenn Tranter	2,695	11.4	+1.1
Family First	Rosie Cirocco	574	2.4	−5.0
Real Change	Janice Hutchison	314	1.3	+1.3
Australian Family	James Bodycote	98	0.4	+0.4
Fair Go	Casey Marley-Duncan	75	0.3	+0.3
Total formal votes		23,683	96.3	−0.6
Informal votes		904	3.7	+0.6
Turnout		24,587	90.3	−1.3
Two-candidate-preferred result
Labor	Matthew Marozzi	13,846	58.5	+9.9
Liberal	Scott Kennedy	9,836	41.5	−9.9
Labor gain from Liberal		Swing	+9.9	

==== 2022 ====
2022 South Australian state election: Morialta
Party	Candidate	Votes	%	±%
Liberal	John Gardner	10,935	46.2	+1.9
Labor	Matthew Marozzi	8,545	36.1	+11.7
Greens	Alex Dinovitser	2,441	10.3	+4.8
Family First	Nick Zollo	1,763	7.4	+7.4
Total formal votes		23,684	96.9	
Informal votes		756	3.1	
Turnout		24,440	91.6	
Two-party-preferred result
Liberal	John Gardner	12,165	51.4	−8.0
Labor	Matthew Marozzi	11,519	48.6	+8.0
Liberal hold		Swing	−8.0	

Distribution of preferences: Morialta
Party	Candidate	Votes	Round 1		Round 2	
Party	Candidate	Votes	Dist.	Total	Dist.	Total
Quota (50% + 1)		11,843				
Liberal	John Gardner	10,935	+695	11,630	+535	12,165
Labor	Matthew Marozzi	8,545	+698	9,243	+2,276	11,519
Greens	Alex Dinovitser	2,441	+370	2,811	Excluded	
Family First	Nick Zollo	1,763	Excluded			

=== Elections in the 2010s ===
==== 2018 ====
2018 South Australian state election: Morialta
Party	Candidate	Votes	%	±%
Liberal	John Gardner	10,332	44.3	−11.2
Labor	Peter Field	5,146	22.1	−5.6
SA-Best	James Sadler	4,645	19.9	+19.9
Greens	Simon Roberts-Thomson	1,525	6.5	−4.3
Conservatives	Matt Smith	854	3.7	−2.3
Dignity	Tim Farrow	560	2.4	+2.4
Independent	Peter Smythe	240	1.0	+1.0
Total formal votes		23,302	95.9	−1.3
Informal votes		1,007	4.1	+1.3
Turnout		24,309	93.5	−0.2
Two-party-preferred result
Liberal	John Gardner	14,151	60.7	−1.5
Labor	Peter Field	9,151	39.3	+1.5
Liberal hold		Swing	−1.5	

2014 South Australian state election: Morialta
Party	Candidate	Votes	%	±%
Liberal	John Gardner	12,419	54.1	+8.5
Labor	Clare Scriven	7,162	31.2	−8.1
Greens	Scott Andrews	2,033	8.9	+0.9
Family First	Sue Neal	1,357	5.9	+1.5
Total formal votes		22,971	96.9	−0.2
Informal votes		740	3.1	+0.2
Turnout		23,711	93.4	−0.7
Two-party-preferred result
Liberal	John Gardner	13,793	60.0	+7.3
Labor	Clare Scriven	9,178	40.0	−7.3
Liberal hold		Swing	+7.3	

2010 South Australian state election: Morialta
Party	Candidate	Votes	%	±%
Liberal	John Gardner	9,882	47.2	+10.9
Labor	Lindsay Simmons	8,011	38.3	−8.0
Greens	Scott Andrews	1,716	8.2	+1.4
Family First	Elizabeth Smit	824	3.9	−1.8
Save the RAH	Peter Maddern	500	2.4	+2.4
Total formal votes		20,933	96.9	
Informal votes		625	3.1	
Turnout		21,558	94.1	
Two-party-preferred result
Liberal	John Gardner	11,333	54.1	+11.1
Labor	Lindsay Simmons	9,600	45.9	−11.1
Liberal gain from Labor		Swing	+11.1	

=== Elections in the 2000s ===
2006 South Australian state election: Morialta
Party	Candidate	Votes	%	±%
Labor	Lindsay Simmons	9,762	47.7	+12.9
Liberal	Joan Hall	7,211	35.2	−8.6
Greens	Peter Fiebig	1,296	6.3	+6.3
Family First	Jack Button	1,174	5.7	+0.4
Democrats	Tim Farrow	606	3.0	−7.4
Dignity for Disabled	Darren Andrews	418	2.0	+2.0
Total formal votes		20,467	96.4	+0.9
Informal votes		774	3.6	−0.9
Turnout		21,241	93.3	−0.8
Two-party-preferred result
Labor	Lindsay Simmons	11,859	57.9	+12.0
Liberal	Joan Hall	8,608	42.1	−12.0
Labor gain from Liberal		Swing	+12.0	

2002 South Australian state election: Morialta
Party	Candidate	Votes	%	±%
Liberal	Joan Hall	8,733	43.8	−0.5
Labor	Cenz Lancione	6,931	34.8	+3.6
Democrats	Tim Farrow	2,083	10.4	−6.9
Family First	Jack Button	1,054	5.3	+5.3
SA First	Aphiah Salerno	579	2.9	+2.9
One Nation	Rosemary Hemsley	283	1.4	+1.4
Independent	Bruce Preece	272	1.4	+1.4
Total formal votes		19,935	95.5	
Informal votes		930	4.5	
Turnout		20,865	94.1	
Two-party-preferred result
Liberal	Joan Hall	10,791	54.1	−2.4
Labor	Cenz Lancione	9,144	45.9	+2.4
Liberal hold		Swing	−2.4	
