= The Parade, Adelaide =

Road in Adelaide, Australia

The Parade The Parade West, Connell Road South Australia
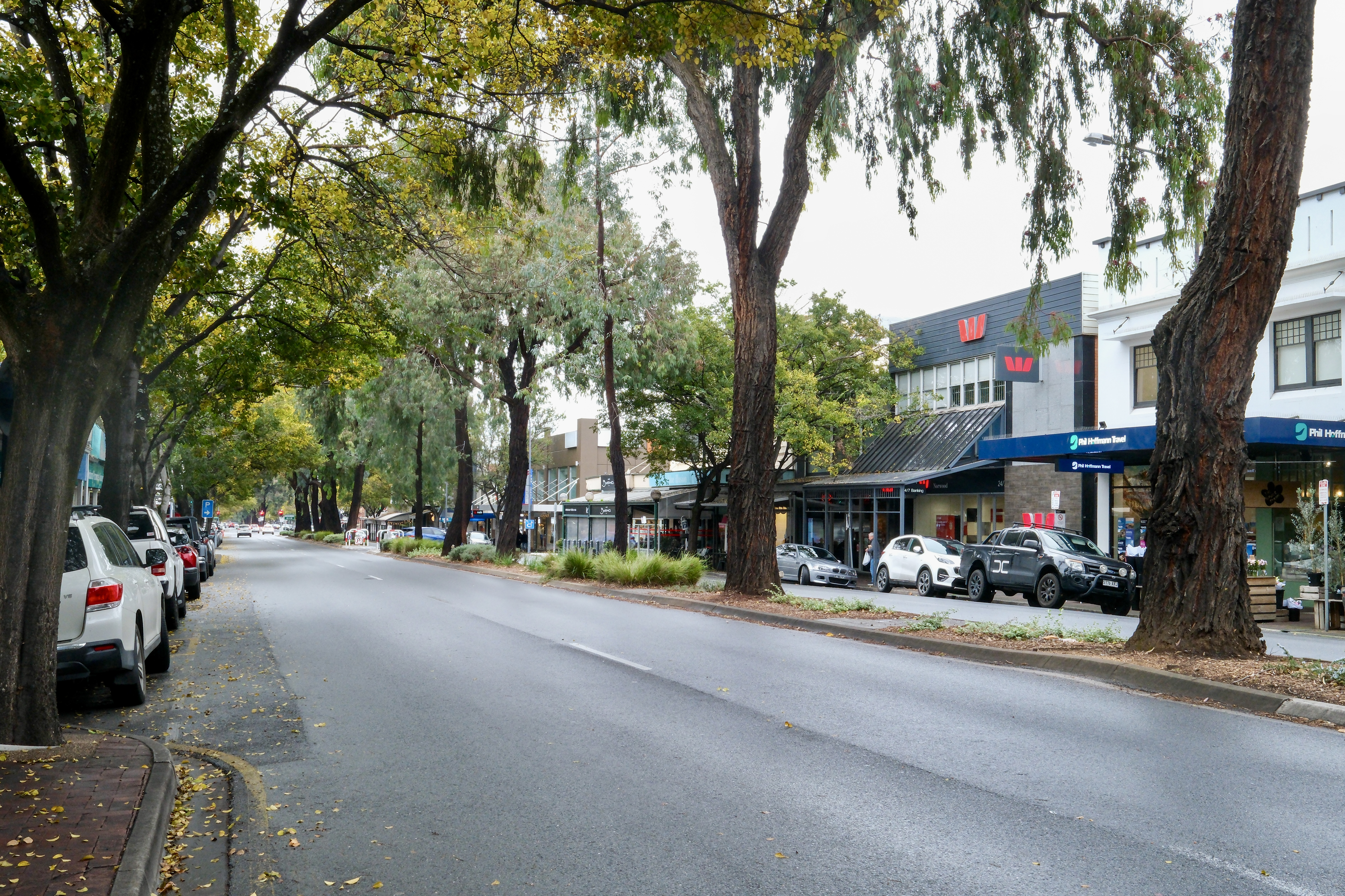
- Norwood, South Australia
- Coordinates: 34.920274°S 138.618824°E (West end); 34.912901°S 138.685073°E (East end)

General information
- Type: Road
- Location: Adelaide
- Length: 6.6 km (4.1 mi)

Major junctions
- West end: Rundle Street; Kent Town, Adelaide
- Fullarton Road; Portrush Road
- East end: Magill Road; Old Norton Summit Road; Auldana, Adelaide

Location(s)
- Region: Eastern Adelaide
- Major suburbs: Norwood, Kensington Park, Kensington Gardens, Magill

The Parade (and its western section as The Parade West, and its eastern section as Connell Road), often referred to as Norwood Parade, is a major arterial road in the South Australian capital of Adelaide, connecting its inner eastern suburbs to the western foot of the Mount Lofty Ranges.

== Route ==
The Parade West starts in the inner eastern suburb of Kent Town and runs south-east and then east to Fullarton Road, where it changes name to The Parade and continues east through Norwood, Kensington Park, Kensington Gardens to Auldana, where it heads north-east for a short distance, before heading north as Connell Road and ending shortly afterwards where Magill Road became Old Norton Summit Road.

The shopping precinct on The Parade in Norwood sees the road turn into a thin, tree lined, four-laned road with various shops, hotels, movie theatres and restaurants on both sides. Of note is the heritage-listed Norwood Town Hall. A significant landmark on The Parade is the Clayton Wesley Uniting Church on the corner of Portrush Road and The Parade in Beulah Park. The church that is visible along the road from Norwood was built in 1883, although an earlier building (still behind the present church) was built in 1856.

The Parade is served by a number of Adelaide Metro bus services including H20, H22, H24 (peak services only) and After Midnight N22 (Friday PM/Saturday AM).

== Major intersections ==
LGA	Location	km	mi	Destinations	Notes
Norwood Payneham & St Peters	Kent Town	0.0	0.0	Rundle Street – Adelaide CBD	Western terminus of The Parade West
Norwood Payneham & St Peters	Kent Town–Norwood	0.5	0.31	Fullarton Road – Dulwich, Fullarton, Springfield	Name change: The Parade West (west), The Parade (east)
Norwood Payneham & St Peters	Norwood	1.3	0.81	Osmond Terrace – Stepney, Rose Park	
Norwood Payneham & St Peters–Burnside boundary	Norwood–Beulah Park–Kensington tripoint	2.1	1.3	Portrush Road (A17) – Northfield, Payneham, Glen Osmond	
Burnside	Kensington Park–Kensington Gardens boundary	3.7	2.3	Glynburn Road – Hectorville, Beaumont	
Burnside	Kensington Gardens–Magill–Rosslyn Park tripoint	5.3	3.3	Penfold Road – Rostrevor, Wattle Park	
Burnside	Magill–Teringie–Auldana tripoint	6.6	4.1	Magill Road (west) – Norwood, Magill; Old Norton Summit Road (east) – Norton Summit, Lobethal	Eastern terminus of The Parade, named as Connell Road for final 150 metres
Route transition
