= Electoral results for the district of Coles =

South Australian district election results

This is a list of electoral results for the Electoral district of Coles in South Australian state elections from 1970 to 1997.

== Members for Coles ==
Member	Party	Term
Len King	Labor	1970–1975
Des Corcoran	Labor	1975–1977
Jennifer Cashmore	Liberal	1977–1993
Joan Hall	Liberal	1993–2002

== Election results ==
=== Elections in the 1990s ===
1997 South Australian state election: Coles
Party	Candidate	Votes	%	±%
Liberal	Joan Hall	8,954	45.9	−11.4
Labor	Susan Dawe	5,957	30.5	+5.6
Democrats	Jonathan Grear	3,179	16.3	+6.9
Independent	Maria Lynch	1,432	7.3	+1.1
Total formal votes		19,522	95.5	−1.1
Informal votes		925	4.5	+1.1
Turnout		20,447	92.2	
Two-party-preferred result
Liberal	Joan Hall	11,291	57.8	−9.1
Labor	Susan Dawe	8,231	42.2	+9.1
Liberal hold		Swing	−9.1	

1993 South Australian state election: Coles
Party	Candidate	Votes	%	±%
Liberal	Joan Hall	10,891	55.9	+7.8
Labor	Susan Dawe	4,985	25.6	−14.3
Democrats	Lorelie Ball	1,876	9.6	−1.5
Independent	Maria Lynch	1,315	6.8	+6.8
Natural Law	Heather Lorenzon	401	2.1	+2.1
Total formal votes		19,468	96.4	−0.2
Informal votes		732	3.6	+0.2
Turnout		20,200	94.5	
Two-party-preferred result
Liberal	Joan Hall	12,828	65.9	+11.7
Labor	Susan Dawe	6,640	34.1	−11.7
Liberal hold		Swing	+11.7	

=== Elections in the 1980s ===
1989 South Australian state election: Coles
Party	Candidate	Votes	%	±%
Liberal	Jennifer Cashmore	9,851	56.9	+2.2
Labor	Rohan Claessen	5,345	30.8	−7.7
Democrats	Pamela Kelly	2,133	12.3	+6.4
Total formal votes		17,329	97.6	+1.0
Informal votes		424	2.4	−1.0
Turnout		17,753	95.3	+1.5
Two-party-preferred result
Liberal	Jennifer Cashmore	10,928	63.1	+4.7
Labor	Rohan Claessen	6,401	36.9	−4.7
Liberal hold		Swing	+4.7	

1985 South Australian state election: Coles
Party	Candidate	Votes	%	±%
Liberal	Jennifer Adamson	8,855	54.7	−0.3
Labor	Ray Rains	6,233	38.5	+1.5
Democrats	Sandra Nichols	949	5.9	−2.1
Independent	Aniello Carbone	142	0.9	+0.9
Total formal votes		16,179	96.6	
Informal votes		576	3.4	
Turnout		16,755	93.8	
Two-party-preferred result
Liberal	Jennifer Adamson	9,445	58.4	−0.6
Labor	Ray Rains	6,734	41.6	+0.6
Liberal hold		Swing	−0.6	

1982 South Australian state election: Coles
Party	Candidate	Votes	%	±%
Liberal	Jennifer Adamson	8,470	48.3	−12.8
Labor	Rosalie McDonald	7,756	44.3	+10.8
Democrats	Stephen Swift	1,294	7.4	+2.0
Total formal votes		17,520	93.2	−2.7
Informal votes		1,277	6.8	+2.7
Turnout		18,797	94.8	+1.7
Two-party-preferred result
Liberal	Jennifer Adamson	8,980	51.3	−10.7
Labor	Rosalie McDonald	8,540	48.7	+10.7
Liberal hold		Swing	−10.7	

=== Elections in the 1970s ===
1979 South Australian state election: Coles
Party	Candidate	Votes	%	±%
Liberal	Jennifer Adamson	9,502	57.8	+6.4
Labor	Andrew Cunningham	5,566	33.9	−14.7
Democrats	Jennifer Hill	1,127	6.9	+6.9
Independent	Jim Bourne	248	1.5	+1.5
Total formal votes		16,443	95.9	−1.3
Informal votes		705	4.1	+1.3
Turnout		17,148	93.1	−1.3
Two-party-preferred result
Liberal	Jennifer Adamson	10,195	62.0	+10.6
Labor	Andrew Cunningham	6,248	38.0	−10.6
Liberal hold		Swing	+10.6	

1977 South Australian state election: Coles
Party	Candidate	Votes	%	±%
Liberal	Jennifer Adamson	8,355	51.4	+12.7
Labor	Greg Crafter	7,903	48.6	+5.1
Total formal votes		16,258	97.2	
Informal votes		468	2.8	
Turnout		16,726	94.4	
Liberal hold		Swing	−2.4	

1975 South Australian state election: Coles
Party	Candidate	Votes	%	±%
Labor	Des Corcoran	10,010	52.4	−6.8
Liberal	Peter Lewis	5,739	30.0	−10.8
Liberal Movement	Lawrence Titheradge	3,352	17.6	+17.6
Total formal votes		19,101	96.0	−0.7
Informal votes		791	4.0	+0.7
Turnout		19,892	94.7	−0.7
Two-party-preferred result
Labor	Des Corcoran	10,353	54.2	−5.0
Liberal	Peter Lewis	8,748	45.8	+5.0
Labor hold		Swing	−5.0	

1973 South Australian state election: Coles
Party	Candidate	Votes	%	±%
Labor	Len King	10,341	59.2	+4.7
Liberal and Country	Graeme Sargent	7,116	40.8	−1.9
Total formal votes		17,457	96.7	−1.4
Informal votes		589	3.3	+1.4
Turnout		18,046	95.4	−1.6
Labor hold		Swing	+4.3	

1970 South Australian state election: Coles
Party	Candidate	Votes	%	±%
Labor	Len King	8,802	54.5	
Liberal and Country	Graeme Sargent	6,898	42.7	
Democratic Labor	Gordon Kimpton	450	2.8	
Total formal votes		16,150	98.1	
Informal votes		313	1.9	
Turnout		16,463	97.0	
Two-party-preferred result
Labor	Len King	8,869	54.9	
Liberal and Country	Graeme Sargent	7,281	45.1	
Labor hold		Swing		
