= Alfred Traeger =

Australian inventor (1895–1980)

- Born: Alfred Hermann Traeger; 2 August 1895; Dimboola, Victoria
- Died: 31 July 1980 (aged 84); Rosslyn Park, South Australia
- Occupations: Engineer and inventor
- Years active: 1912–1980
- Known for: pedal radio

Alfred Hermann Traeger (2 August 1895 – 31 July 1980), known as Alf Traeger, was an Australian engineer and inventor, chiefly known for the development of the pedal radio used by both the School of the Air and by the Royal Flying Doctor Service.

== Early life and education ==
Traeger was born at Glenlee, near Dimboola, Victoria, and raised near and in Adelaide, South Australia, the son of South Australian-born parents. His paternal grandparents had been German migrants to the young colony in 1848.

Traeger attended Balaklava Public School, about 92 kilometres (57 mi) north of Adelaide, then Martin Luther School in Flinders Street, Adelaide, followed by two years at Adelaide Technical High School (now Glenunga International High School). From 1912, aged 16, he spent three years at the South Australian School of Mines and Industries, studying mechanical and electrical engineering, earning an Associate Diploma.

At the age of 12, he built a telephone from the farmhouse to a shed, making all of the components himself. He had built his own radio transmitter before graduation from college.

== Early career ==
He first worked for the Metropolitan Tramways Trust and the Postmaster-General's Department, but his application to join the Australian Flying Corps in World War I was refused.

Around 1923 Traeger joined Hannan Bros, repairing motor vehicle generators and other electrical goods. He developed an interest in radio, and obtained an amateur radio operator's licence and built his first pedal transmitter-receiver.

== Inventions and business success ==
He was instrumental in the establishment and early success of the Royal Flying Doctor Service of Australia. During the 1920s, he was contacted by John Flynn to assist in experiments which were to enable remote families access to medical treatment by using radio equipment, on the way to setting up his Australian Inland Mission Aerial Medical Service. From 1926 Traeger worked for Flynn. Northern Territory radio experiments and the first official flight for the service took place in 1928.

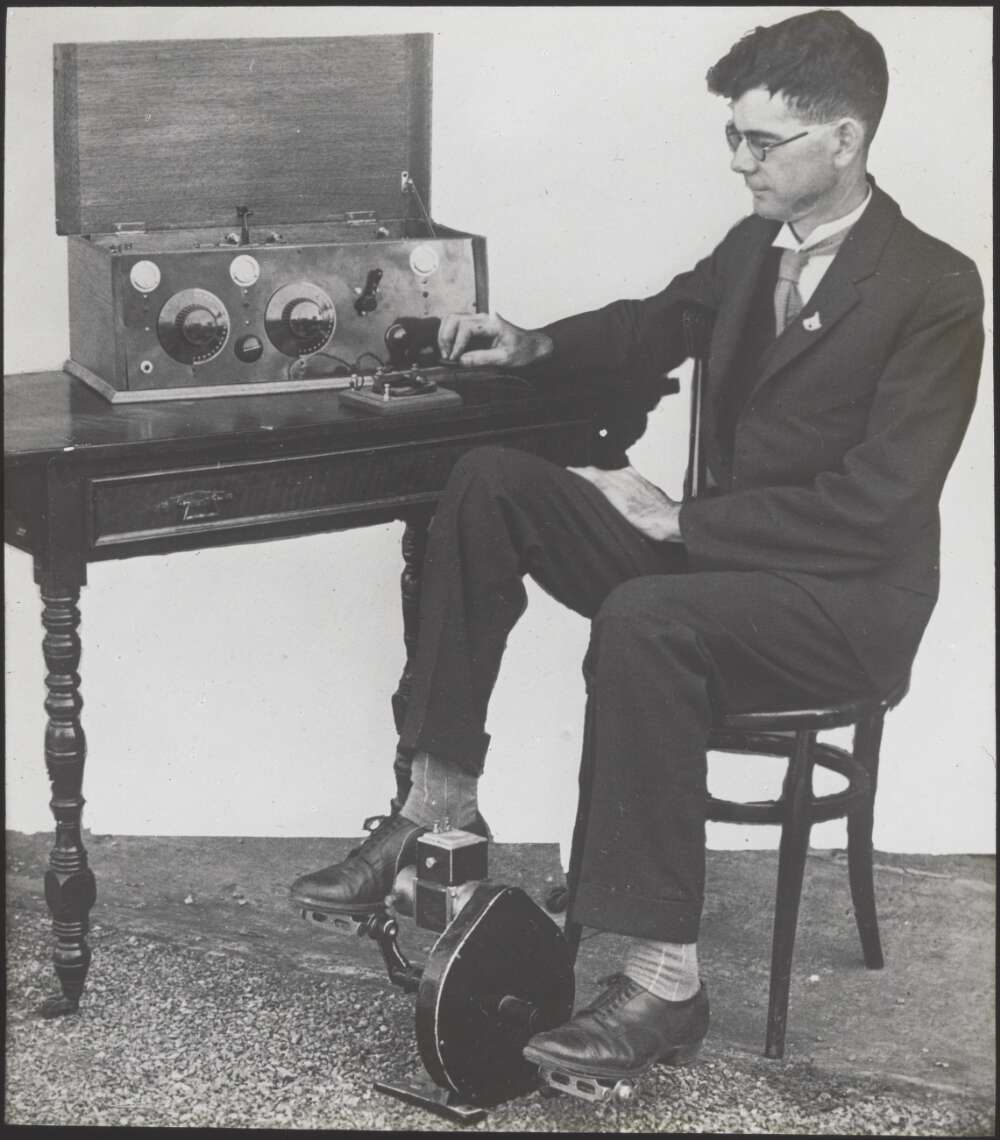
The photograph taken by Flynn of Traeger in 1928 demonstrating his pedal radio, He is operating a morse key.

Traeger returned to Adelaide and worked on a transceiver for the network, which had to be small, cheap, durable and easy to operate. He found that a person could drive the generator using bicycle pedals, and he built his transceiver into a box. His famous "pedal wireless" was a pedal-operated generator which provided power for a transceiver. He divided his time between his workshop and the outback, where he also taught radio operating and Morse code.

The first pedal sets were introduced in Queensland in 1929, which had an immediate impact on the isolation felt by people living in remote places. In 1933 Traeger invented a typewriter Morse keyboard as an accessory to the pedal sets, widely used before the invention of telephony. Over time, emergency call systems linked country-dwellers with hospitals, and sets were used by the School of the Air, doctors, ambulances, councils, taxis, airlines and ships.

His first workshop was in the eastern suburb of Kensington Gardens, in 1937 moving to a larger premises at 11 Dudley Road, Marryatville, where it continued to function until his death in 1980.

Traeger's invention, along with the ideas and drive of educator Adelaide Miethke, were pivotal in the development of the School of the Air.

He made subsequent refinements to this system: an alphanumeric keyboard was developed which enabled unskilled operators to type their message in plain language, and later developed a voice-capable transceiver. He was assisted by his younger brother, Johann Gustav Traeger, and his father, Johann Hermann Traeger.

The Traeger Transceivers company was founded, and radios were exported to a number of countries: in 1962 pedal sets were sold to Nigeria; in 1970 an educational radio network was sold to Canada. Traeger continued inventing: he designed a turbine-driven car and used solar power to convert salt water to fresh water.

== Family and later life ==
He married Olga Emilie Schodde on 11 November 1937, who died in 1948, after the couple had two daughters. On 2 August 1956 he married a young widow, Joyce Edna Mibus, née Traeger (no relation), with whom he had a son and another two daughters.

He died on 31 July 1980 in the eastern suburb of Rosslyn Park and was buried in Centennial Park Cemetery.

== Honours and legacy ==
Traeger was awarded an OBE in 1944.

At the Traeger Park sports field in Alice Springs, a plaque and the Royal Flying Doctor Service aeroplane commemorate him.

The electoral district of Traeger (a vast rural and remote electorate created in the 2017 Queensland state electoral redistribution) was named after him in recognition of the significant contribution he made to people living in remote and rural areas in Queensland.

A plaque marks the site of the Traeger workshop at 11 Dudley Road, Marryatville, commissioned by the Kensington & Norwood Historical Society in 1998.

In 1999, the Wakefield Regional Council in South Australia commissioned a sundial and plaque to be placed at the southern entrance to Balaklava. Funding for the project came from the History Trust of South Australia, Wireless Institute of Australia, the 4WD enthusiasts' associations and the council. The memorial was unveiled on Australia Day, with his widow Joyce Traeger and other family members in attendance.

In 1999, the model of the transceiver known the "Traeger Scout" was still in production, with little change to its design except for the colour of the case since the first model produced. Following the closure of Traeger Transceivers, the model was continued as the "Tracker Scout", made in Adelaide by Tracker Communications; after they closed, Scout Communications (part of Oz Electronics Manufacturing) in Brisbane continued manufacture.

The Traeger Emergency Roadstrip is on the Stuart Highway in Far North of South Australia.
