= Skye, South Australia =

Skye
- Suburb
- Country: Australia
- State: South Australia
- City: Adelaide
- LGA: City of Burnside
- Location: 8.6 km (5.3 mi) E of Adelaide city centre

Government
  - State electorate: Morialta (2011)
  - Federal division: Sturt (2011)

Population
  - Total: 293 (SAL 2021)
- Postcode: 5072
Suburbs around Skye
Auldana	Teringie	Teringie
Wattle Park	Skye	Horsnell Gully
Stonyfell	Horsnell Gully	Horsnell Gully

Skye is an eastern suburb of Adelaide, South Australia. It is located in the City of Burnside.

== Geography ==
The suburb is located in the foothills of the Adelaide Hills, in a region known as the Hills Face Zone. It is the easternmost suburb in the Burnside council area. Most of the streets have expansive westward views over the Adelaide plains. Allotments in these streets thereby command high prices. As a result, there are many prestige residences.

== Demographics ==
The 2021 Census by the Australian Bureau of Statistics counted 341 persons in Skye on census night. Of these, 44.4% were male and 55.6% were female.

== Facilities and attractions ==
=== Views ===
Many parts of Skye have views over Adelaide, reaching to Spencer Gulf.

=== Parks ===
There is a reserve between Wyfield Street and Knox Terrace.

=== Water ===
Supply of reticulated water has been controversial for decades, primarily due to the steepness of the streets. Previously, many allotments within the suburb have no government water supply, instead being serviced by independent water schemes sourced from bores, some being privately owned, some being co-operatives. However SA Water is now taking responsibility for the water supply with all homes expected to be connected to their systems in early 2016.

=== Roads ===
Skye is serviced by Old Norton Summit Road, connecting the suburb to Magill Road and Adelaide city centre. The loftiest (and most populous) portions of the suburb are reached by Coach Road, sections of which are quite steep. Coach Road is an extension of Norwood Parade.

== See also ==
- List of Adelaide suburbs
