= Rostrevor College =

Location
- Woodforde, South Australia; Australia; 34°54′04″S 138°41′11″E

Information
- Type: Independent primary and secondary day and boarding
- Motto: Latin: Palma Merenti (The reward to the one who earns it)
- Religious affiliation: Catholicism
- Denomination: Congregation of Christian Brothers
- Established: 6 May 1923
- Oversight: Catholic Education South Australia
- Trust: Edmund Rice Education Australia
- Principal: Shana Bennett
- Years offered: R–12
- Gender: Boys
- Enrolment: approx. 1100
- Area: 16 hectares (40 acres)
- Colours: Red and black
- Affiliations: Association of Heads of Independent Schools of Australia; Australian Boarding Schools' Association; Junior School Heads Association of Australia; Sports Association for Adelaide Schools
- Website: www.rostrevor.sa.edu.au
- Christian Brothers schools in South Australia; CBC • Rostrevor • St. Paul's

Rostrevor College is an independent Catholic primary and secondary day and boarding school for boys, founded in 1923, located in Woodforde, a suburb of Adelaide, South Australia, approximately 9 kilometres (6 mi) from the Adelaide city centre.

The school was established in 1923 by the Christian Brothers, one of three such schools in South Australia, along with St Paul's College, Adelaide and Christian Brothers College, Adelaide. Its founder and first headmaster was Brother David Purton. The school currently enrols approximately 1000 students from Reception to Year 12, including boarders in Years 7 to 12. The students are divided into Junior (R–6), Middle (7–9) and Senior (10–12) Years, who together share a 16-hectare (40-acre) campus situated in the Morialta foothills.

Rostrevor College is a member of the Association of Heads of Independent Schools of Australia (AHISA), the Australian Boarding Schools' Association, the Junior School Heads Association of Australia (JSHAA), and the Independent Schools Sport Association (ISSA).

Rostrevor College has 5 houses. Barron Egan Gurr Murphy O'Brien Webb

== List of Headmasters/Principals ==
- Brother D.G. Purton (1923)
- Brother J.F. O'Brien (1924–1926)
- Brother M.P. Dwyer (1927)
- Brother D.O. Joyce (1928–1933)
- Brother I.L. Mackey (1933–1938)
- Brother J.E. McElligott (1939–1941)
- Brother P.L. Duffy (1942)
- Brother C.A. Mogg (1943–1945, 1950–1955)
- Brother S.L. Carroll (1946–1947)
- Brother B.G. Rooney (1948–1949)
- Brother J.L. Kelty (1956–1961)
- Brother J.N. O'Sullivan (1962–1967)
- Brother R.M. Morphett (1968–1970)
- Brother W.G. Hall (1971–1973)
- Brother J.V. Bourke (1974–1976)
- Brother J.P. Marks (1977–1984)
- Brother K.C. McMaster (1984–1987)
- Brother T.X. Hann (1988 – June 1992)
- Brother P.D. McGlaughlin (July 1992 – July 2002)
- Mr J Croser (2003–2010)
- Mr S Dash (2011–2016)
- Mr D Messer (2017)
- Mr B Schumacher (2018–2020)
- Mr F Ranaldo (2021)
- Mrs S Bennett (2022–present)

== History ==
=== 1923–1970s ===
Rostrevor College originated as an extension of Christian Brothers College, Adelaide (CBC Adelaide) which had, by 1922, outgrown its ability to house its boarding students on the Wakefield Street campus. In December 1922, the Christian Brothers purchased the Rostrevor Estate in Magill for a sum equivalent to $20,500. The previous owner of Rostrevor has been a nurseryman and as such, the original grounds incorporated extensive and well-kept gardens and orchards of oranges, lemons and stone fruits, as well as Rostrevor House, a coach house, caretakers' residence, stables, and a large lake providing on-site water supply.

Rostrevor is a village near Newry, County Down, Ireland, where Ross Thompson Reid was raised. Reid arrived in South Australia in 1839 as a child. He accumulated wealth and built a magnificent mansion which he named Rostrevor Hall.

Although the school is situated along the boundary of the suburb of Woodforde, the adjacent suburb of Rostrevor was named in honour of the original grounds on which the school is sited. Rostrevor Hall, now widely known as Rostrevor House, was constructed in two stages with the southern two-storey side completed in 1878, and the arches and northern side added in 1901.

The main residence, Rostrevor House, was the original accommodation provided to the boarders, the Christian Brothers, and some of the classes. From the time of taking possession in February 1923, a large new chapel, five classrooms and a chemistry laboratory were built before the college could be opened. By the end of the first term these facilities were ready and so after the May holidays, classes commenced at Rostrevor College on 29 May 1923.

Brother Purton was appointed Headmaster of the new college and he, along with three other Brothers, namely McMahon, O'Sullivan and Dean (the last would be replaced later that year by Br Coghlan), all of the boarders and all students in the Intermediate, Leaving and Leaving Honours classes transferred to Rostrevor. Some day scholars joined the junior grades and, from the beginning, there were classes from the very junior grades to Leaving Honours at Rostrevor. For many years after 1923, students from CBC Adelaide transferred to Rostrevor after Intermediate to study from Leaving and Leaving Honours, thus maintaining a close link between the two colleges; in fact, sports teams were drawn from both until the early 1940s, when Leaving and Leaving Honours classes were re-established at CBC Adelaide. From then on, the two colleges became separate and competing establishments. By the end of 1923, Rostrevor was well established as a school. Throughout the year more facilities, including the bungalow for more accommodation for the boarders and extra classrooms, had been built and Rostrevor was able to settle down to a period of consolidation.

Dan Clifford (1887–1942), owner of D. Clifford Theatres, a cinema chain, was a generous benefactor of the school. Among other things, he commissioned and donated the first ever Rostrevor flag, as well as donating the school's first movie projector. His son, Dan Jnr, attended the school from 1944, after his father's death.

The bungalow, which used to exist alongside what is now the Junior School oval, to which it has lent its name ('The Bungalow'), was demolished in 1960. Further developments included the construction of the Rice Wing in 1961, named in honour of the founder of the Christian Brothers, Edmund Ignatius Rice. The Purton Auditorium was completed in 1970, the Mogg wing in the mid-1970s and the J.V. Bourke swimming pool in the late 1970s.

=== 1980s to present ===
During 1983, Rostrevor celebrated its Diamond Jubilee. The major project for these celebrations was the substantial renovation to the College Chapel. This saw the restoration of the building itself, beautification of its immediate surroundings, redecoration of the interior, new seating at the front of the chapel and a new pipe organ.

During the Jubilee Year, attempts were made to negotiate the retention of the Boarding School. Unfortunately, these efforts were not successful, and so the last group of boarders left at the end of 1983, thus temporarily ending an era in the history of Rostrevor and of the Catholic Church in South Australia. By the mid-1980s, enrolments increased to over 900 and formal management structures were established, with the appointment of Heads of Department responsible for Curriculum Development and the introduction of new Pastoral Care Arrangements. In 1987 the Rostrevor College Board was established, with Justice Kevin Duggan as first chairman. To ensure a sound financial base for future development, the Rostrevor Foundation was also established, with Creagh O'Connor as the first chairman.

The South Australian Commission for Catholic Schools set up a Task Force to examine the needs of Catholic Boarding Schools in South Australia, and asked Rostrevor to again admit boarders. This was agreed to, thus reversing the decision taken some ten years earlier.

Governance was ceded from the Christian Brothers to the newly organised Edmund Rice Education Australia in October 2007. The Christian Brothers community at Rostrevor, located close to the school, is the last remaining in the state. The last full time Christian Brother on staff retired in 2017, although several maintain a close association with and volunteer at the college.

Recent improvements to the school, include the construction in 2006 of the new 'Technology and ICT Discovery Centre', with displays of robotics and pneumatics, design and computing. The former 'Technology Centre' was upgraded at the same time, to now be the 'Skills Centre' includes the new Environmental Education Centre and Vocational Counselling facilities. 29 May 2018 marked the 95th anniversary of the college since 1923 classes officially commenced at Rostrevor College. Port Adelaide defender Jack Hombsch joined the celebration. The boys marked a 95 on one of the ovals while a high-tech drone hovered above the College grounds.

== Curriculum ==
Rostrevor College offers education in the nationally recognised South Australian Certificate of Education (SACE). The curriculum includes a choice of more than 25 subjects in Year 12, and the option to study vocational courses from Year 10.

== Notable alumni ==
- Paul Blackwell, actor
- Paul Cronin, actor
- Paul Kelly, musician
- Anthony LaPaglia, actor
- Jonathan LaPaglia, physician and actor, host of Australian Survivor
- Aldo Mignone, actor
- John Noble, actor and theatre director
- Xavier Samuel, actor
- John Schumann AM, Lead Singer of Redgum, I Was Only 19
- Murali K. Thalluri, film director, writer, and producer
- Mark Leonard Winter, actor

Business

- Andrew Pridham AO, investment banker; Chairman of Sydney Swans

Clergy

- Mark Coleridge, Archbishop of Brisbane
- George Crennan, Catholic cleric
- John Patrick O'Loughlin, Bishop of Darwin

Other

- Michael David, Judge in the Supreme Court of South Australia
- David David, renowned surgeon

Politics

- Pat Galvin, Former Australian Politician, Speaker of the South Australian House of Assembly
- Vincent Tarzia, Leader of the Opposition in South Australia, Liberal Party
- John Trainer, politician
- Ian Tuxworth, Former Chief Minister of the Northern Territory

Sports

- John Aloisi, former Socceroo, FIFA World Cup player
- Ross Aloisi, former Socceroo and Adelaide United captain
- Jared Crouch, Sydney Swans 2005 Premiership Player
- Tim Cook, former Adelaide Crows and Central District footballer
- Luke Darcy, former Western Bulldogs captain, All-Australia, AFLPA MVP and media personality
- Daniel Falzon, five-time Australian Motorcycle Racing champion
- Darcy Fogarty, Adelaide Crows footballer
- Ben Hart, Adelaide 1997 & 1998 Premiership Player, 4x All-Australian
- Jack Hombsch, former Port Adelaide footballer and current Gold Coast footballer
- David Hynes, West Coast Eagles 1994 Premiership Player, 3x Port Adelaide SANFL Premiership
- Paul Izzo, Socceroo and Randers FC footballer
- Stan Jaffer (footballer), former South Australian Captain & South Adelaide Captain
- Ben Jarvis, footballer
- Tom Jonas, former Port Adelaide captain
- Bruce Kamau, former A-League footballer
- Neil Kerley, SANFL Football Legend, AFL Hall of Fame and media personality
- George Margitich, former Melbourne Demons player
- Peter Marker, former Glenelg and SA football captain, sports presenter
- Max Michalanney, AFL footballer
- Harry Petty, Melbourne Demons 2021 Premiership Player
- Elkin Reilly, South Melbourne footballer
- Daniel Schell, former Adelaide Crows and Central District footballer
- Henry Slattery, former Essendon Bombers footballer
- Jason Spagnuolo, former A-League footballer
- Bert Tobin, former South Australian state cricketer
- Peter Vivian, former Norwood FC captain and SA football player
- Callum Wilkie, AFL Footballer, 2023 All-Australian Team

== See also ==
- Catholic Church in Australia
- List of schools in South Australia
- List of boarding schools
