= Norwood, South Australia =

Norwood
- Suburb
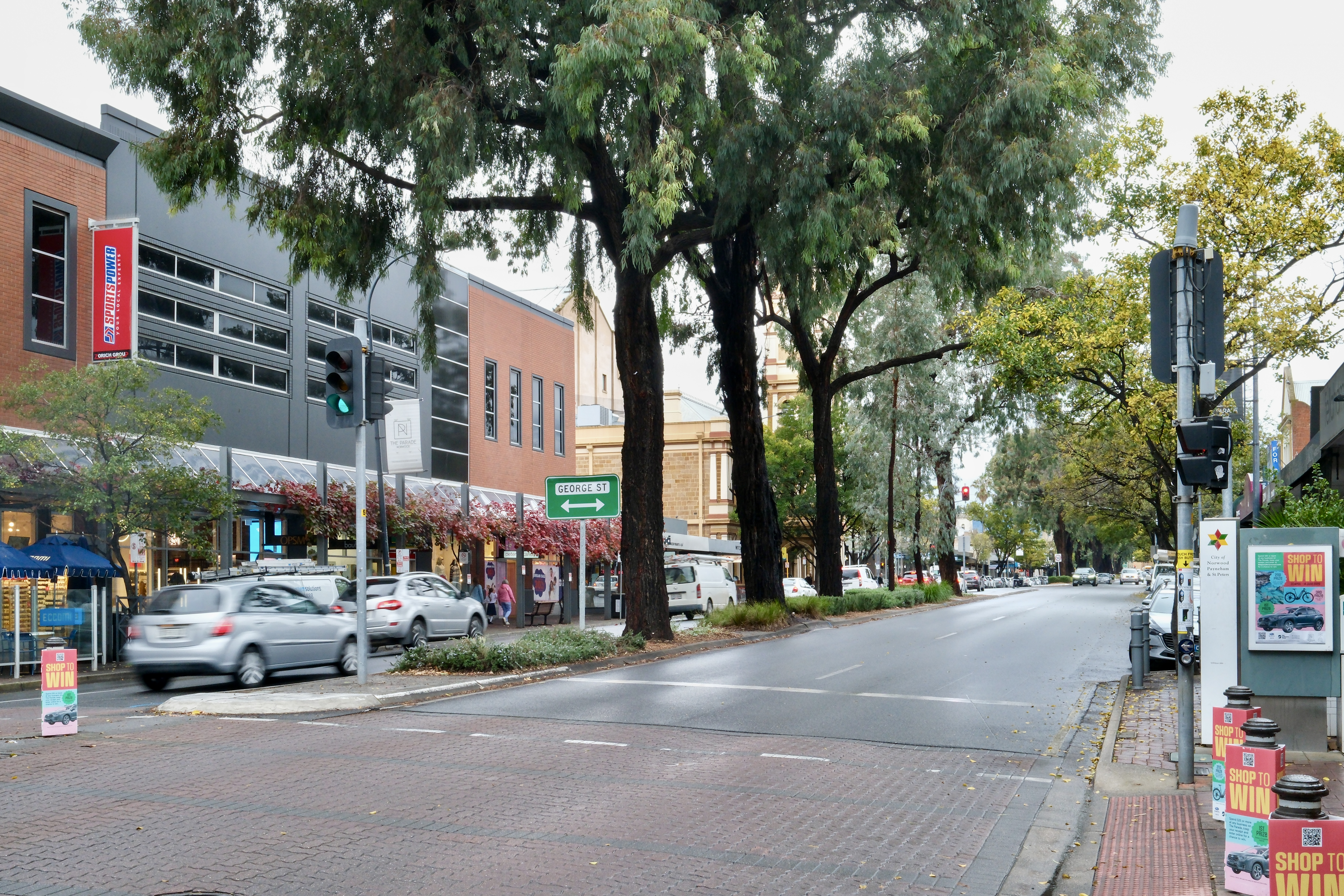
- The Parade at Norwood, 2026

- Interactive map of Norwood
- Country: Australia
- State: South Australia
- City: Adelaide
- LGA: City of Norwood Payneham & St Peters
- Location: 4 km (2.5 mi) from Adelaide
- Established: 1847

Government
  - State electorate: Dunstan
  - Federal division: Sturt

Population
  - Total: 6,354 (SAL 2021)
- Postcode: 5067
Suburbs around Norwood
College Park	Stepney	Maylands
Kent Town	Norwood	Beulah Park; Kensington
Adelaide Park Lands	Rose Park & Toorak Gardens	Heathpool

Norwood is a suburb of Adelaide, about 4 km (2.5 mi) east of the Adelaide city centre. The suburb is in the City of Norwood Payneham & St Peters, whose predecessor was the oldest South Australian local government municipality.

The Parade runs east to west through the centre of the suburb. Two roads run parallel to this, also along the whole length of the suburb: Beulah Road to the north, and William Street to the south.

== History ==
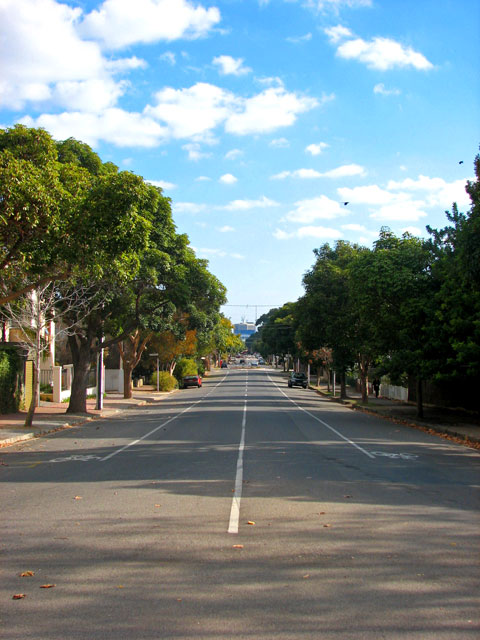
William Street in Norwood, facing west towards the Adelaide city centre

Before British colonisation of South Australia and subsequent European settlement, Norwood was inhabited by one of the groups who later collectively became known as the Kaurna peoples.

Early settler Edward Stephens, who arrived in the colony in 1839, wrote: "Norwood and Kent Town were unknown then. The site of the present Norwood was then a magnificent gum forest, with an undergrowth of kangaroo grass, too high in places for a man to see over; in fact persons lost their way in going from Adelaide to Kensington in those days, through attempting a short or near cut across the country".

Norwood is named after Norwood, then a village south of London. The new village east of Adelaide was first laid out in 1847. The former City of Kensington and Norwood was the first outside of the City of Adelaide to receive the right to set up their own municipal corporation. The charter of the town was given on 7 July 1853 by the Governor, Sir Henry Young.

=== Trams ===
The first permanent street-based public transport service in Adelaide was provided in Norwood and Kensington, and these suburbs were also the first to be served by electric trams. The Adelaide and Suburban Tramway Company, the first horse-drawn tram company, started laying tracks from the City of Adelaide to Norwood and Kensington in 1877, with the first trams running in June 1878. The Adelaide and Suburban Tramway Company was acquired by the Municipal Tramways Trust, and the Kensington line converted to an electric tramway in 1909. The interim Kensington terminus was at The Parade/Gurrs Road intersection, before being extended, as part of the network of Adelaide trams, to serve the recently created reserve up The Parade at Kensington Gardens.

Until 1952, the service was linked in with the other eastern suburbs tramlines and terminated in the city, but in that year it was "through routed" with trams running to Henley Beach. The tramway closed in February 1957.

=== Jubilee Cycling Arena ===
In February 1951 the Jubilee Cycling Arena, aka Norwood Velodrome, opened on Osmond Terrace. It was a steeply banked concrete velodrome, with six laps to the mile, designed by Eddie Smith. During the summer, there were races held every Friday night. It became a popular spot for keen cyclists, and was also used as a venue for square dancing in the 1950s.

In 1965 over A$11,000 was raised by cyclists of the Norwood Cycling Club to re-concrete the track.

In 1970, residents organised protests and a green ban in order to stop the destruction of the Norwood Velodrome for high-rise apartments. However, Norwood Council sold the velodrome and surrounding land to real estate developers in 1981.

== Geography and landmarks ==
The suburb consists of four segments, being divided into north and south by the major thoroughfare of The Parade and east and west by Osmond Terrace. It is bounded on the south by Kensington Road on the north by Magill Road, on the east by Portrush Road and on the west by Fullarton Road. It is a leafy suburb, with streets lined with plane trees.

First Creek and Second Creek once flowed through the suburb, but First Creek is only visible between Edward Street and Birrell Street, and both creeks are mostly underground in concrete tunnels.

Osmond Terrace is a street with a wide grass, median strip featuring a prominent war memorial commemorating ANZAC soldiers who fought in the first and second World Wars, created by architect H.F.R. Culley. The median strip also features sculptures from local artists, and rose gardens. There is a sculpture of the first Italian to arrive in the new colony of South Australia in 1839, Antonio Giannoni (1814–1883), who worked as a cab driver in Norwood, and whose son, Peter Gannoni, became mayor in 1920. The memorial bust, created by Wandrina Douglas-Boers, was unveiled in November 1993.

One of the most visible landmarks in Norwood is the Clayton Wesley Uniting Church, at the eastern end of The Parade, on the north-east corner of Portrush Road. Actually located in Beulah Park, the church and spire that are visible along the road from Norwood was built in 1883, although an earlier building (still behind the present church) was built in 1856. The Norwood Town Hall is on the north-western corner of The Parade and George Street.

== Demographics ==
Historical population
Year	Pop.	±%
2001	5,358	—
2006	5,704	+6.5%
2011	5,802	+1.7%
2016	5,953	+2.6%
2021	6,354	+6.7%

Norwood attracted many European migrants post-World War II, in particular Italians. In the 2016 Australian census, 4.1% of the population spoke Italian at home, with Greek coming a close second at 3%. By the 2016 Australian census, the top language other than English spoken at home was Mandarin Chinese, at 3.6%, while 3.2% of the population spoke Italian and 2.8% Greek.

In 2016, there were 5,953 people living in the suburb, with a median income of A$1,485 per week. The top ancestries in 2016 were English, at 26.3% and Australian, at 17%. Only 64.4% were born in Australia, while 43.2% had both parents born in Australia.

== Sport ==
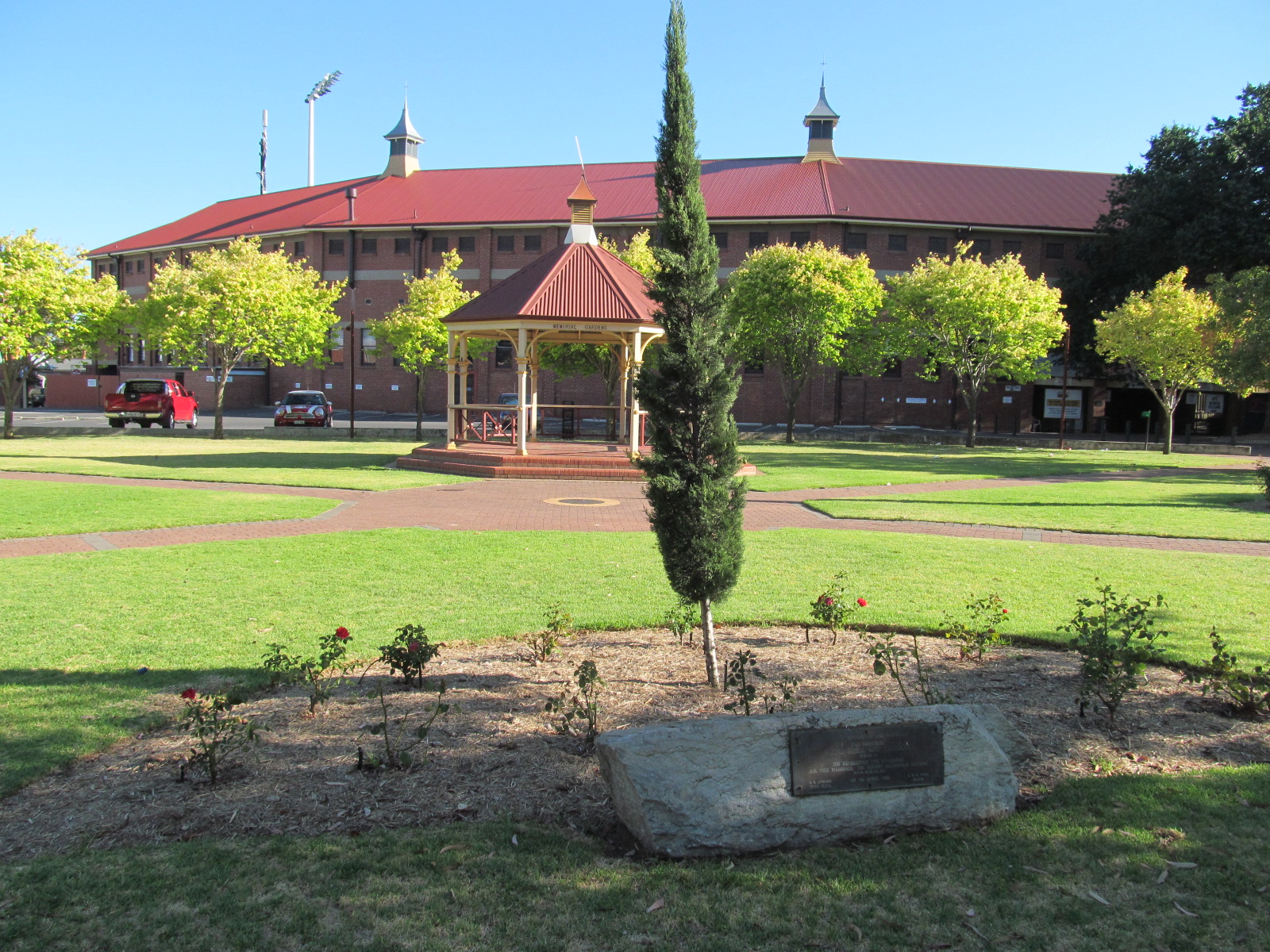
Norwood Oval

=== Norwood Oval ===
Norwood Oval, as of 2021 known as the Coopers Stadium, on The Parade, is home to the Norwood Redlegs, a South Australian National Football League (Australian Rules Football) team It also hosts some AFL Women's (national league) matches, including the Adelaide Crows. It is the former home of Adelaide Bite, an Australian Baseball League team .

=== Norwood Cycling Club ===
The Norwood Cycling Club (NCC) is the largest cycling club in South Australia, with 380 members as of 2021, and its 1883 foundation date makes it the oldest such club in the Southern Hemisphere. It was founded as the Norwood Cycle and Motor Club, and its official opening was at Kensington Oval, a bit further up The Parade in the suburb of Kensington, on 4 February 1884. Sir Edwin Smith was a foundation member and patron of the club, which became incorporated in 1918, after it had bought land and built clubrooms at Port Noarlunga. After the Jubilee Cycling Arena was built in Norwood in 1951, the club's members used to race there, and in 1965 the club raised money to concrete the track. Its clubrooms opened in George Street in 1975.

Former members of the club include many champions, including Jack Bobridge, Luke Roberts, Tim Roe, Alexis Rhodes, Tiffany Cromwell, Patrick Jonker, Michael Turtur, David Solari (son of Nino Solari), Wayne McCarney, Charlie Walsh and Jay Sweet.

Each year the club promotes four major cycling events:

- the Noarlunga Road race (since 1919);
- the Burra 2-day Classic;
- the Tour of the Riverland (established 1975); and
- the AlphutteClassic Handicap.

NCC is affiliated with Cycling SA, which is in turn affiliated with the national parent body of the state bodies, Cycling Australia.

=== Norwood Croquet Club ===
The Norwood Croquet Club is at the Buttery Sports Ground, Portrush Road, Norwood. The club was founded in 1939 and has over 100 members. There are four championship quality courts (or greens) with overhead lights for night play.

== Attractions ==
Norwood is known for its many restaurants and shops selling fashion and goods of all kinds. It also plays host to a variety of events and festivals throughout the year.

=== Odeon Theatre ===
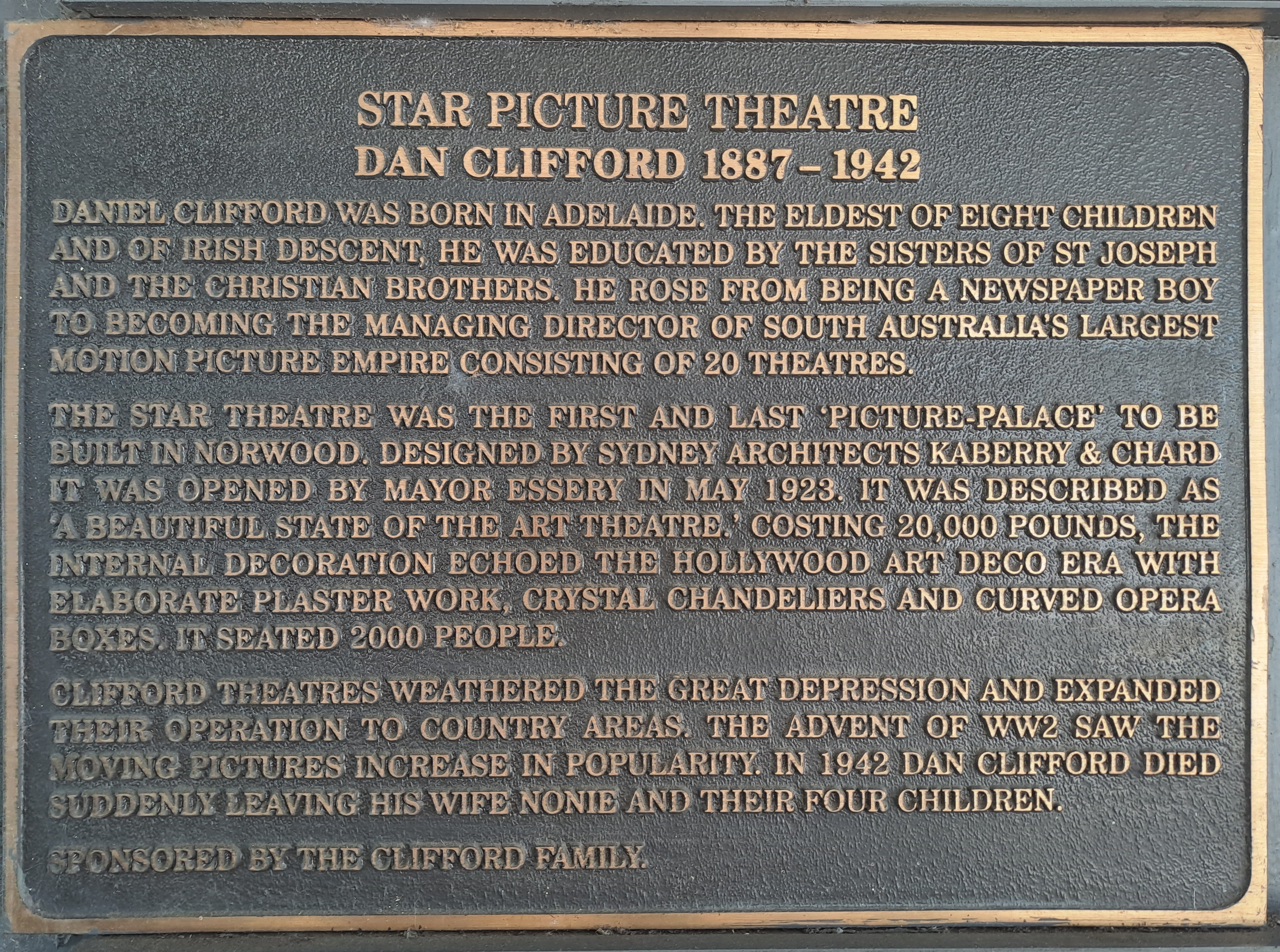
Star Theatre Norwood plaque

The Odeon Theatre is on the corner of The Parade and Queen Street. Originally the Star Theatre, it was designed as a picture theatre by Sydney architects Kaberry and Chard (who also designed the Thebarton Theatre, the Athenium Theatre in Junee, New South Wales, and many other cinemas across Australia) in association with local supervising architect Chris A. Smith. It was officially opened by Norwood mayor William Essery (Snr) on Wednesday 16 May 1923, with its entrance on The Parade. The operator was D. Clifford Theatres (formerly Star Theatres) by 1946. Later it was taken over by Greater Union Cinemas and renamed the Odeon Theatre (also known as Odeon Norwood). It closed as a cinema, reopening in 1986 as a live theatre specialising in children's productions. The entrance was moved around the corner onto Queen Street, and the original foyer converted into restaurant, as of 2024 St Louis dessert bar.

As of February 2024, the Odeon is home to Australian Dance Theatre, which offers dance classes to adults. The venue is hired out for various performing arts events, such as the Adelaide Festival, Adelaide Fringe and State Theatre Company of South Australia performances.

== Heritage listed buildings ==
=== Pubs ===
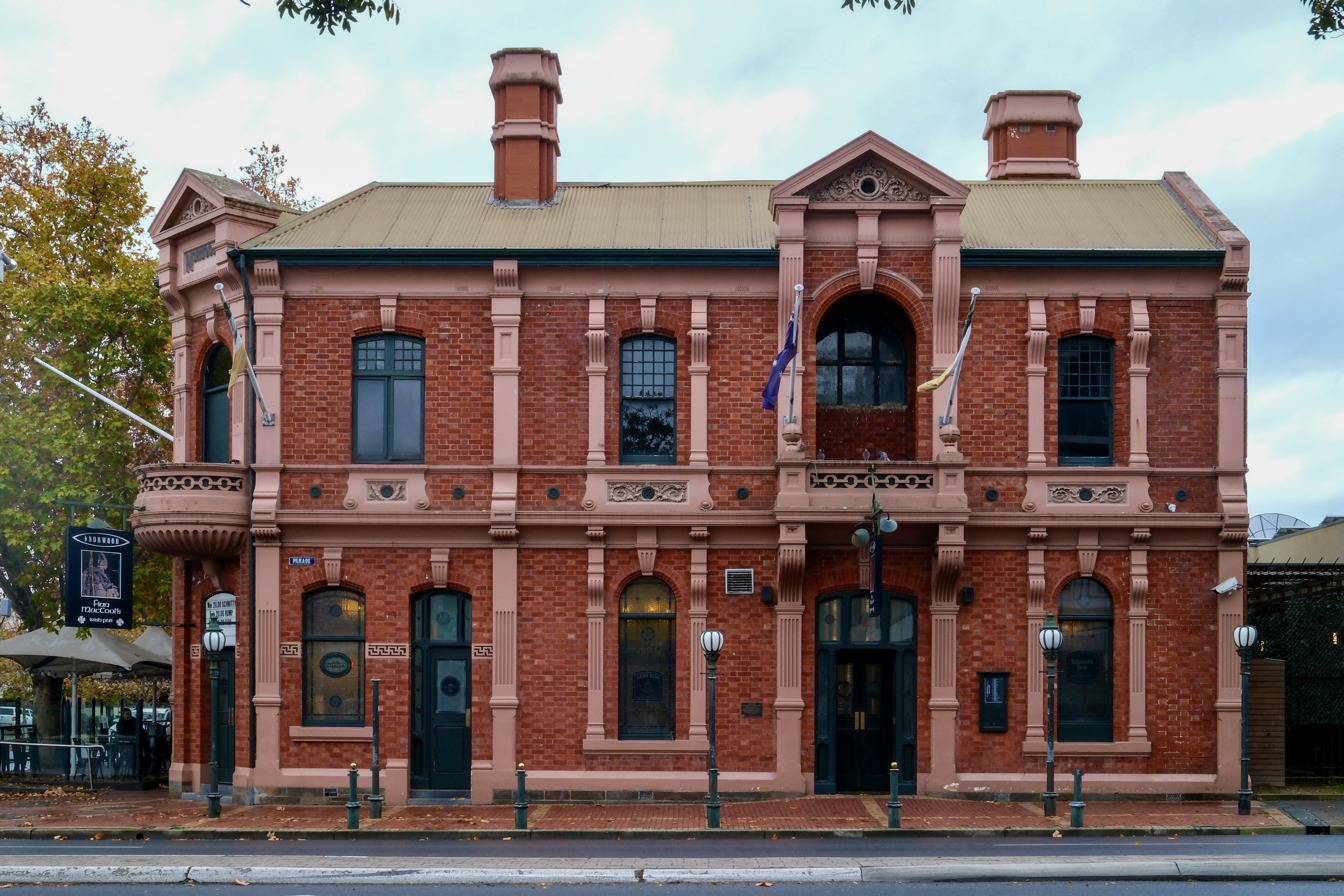
Norwood Hotel in 2026

Historic pubs in Norwood include:

- Bath Hotel, on the southeast corner of the Parade and Queen Street, was designed by Thomas English and built around 1881 to 1883. It replaced two earlier buildings, the original having been licensed in 1857 and rebuilt after a fire in 1877. A balcony on the Parade facade was removed in 1960. It was locally heritage-listed in August 2000; and underwent a major renovation in 2006.
- The Colonist, formerly known as The Colonist Tavern and Old Colonist Hotel, was first licensed in 1851, but the present building on the south-western corner of the Parade and Sydenham Road was only constructed around 1883, when it was built as a single-storey building. It underwent significant refurbishments in the 1870s, and an upper storey was constructed in 1911. It was locally heritage-listed in August 2000.
- Norwood Hotel, situated on the northeast corner of the Parade and Osmond Terrace, was designed by Charles Howard Marryat and completed in 1884, built by C.H.F. Boehm. Considered too elaborate at that time, it was described in a 1984 heritage assessment as an "imposing and solid example of largely intact high Victorian architecture", and was heritage-listed on the South Australian Heritage Register in September 1990. An earlier building, known as the Norwood Arms, was a single-storey building built in 1848, and the first pub in Norwood. The first meeting of the Kensington and Norwood Council was held in it.
- The Republic, formerly the Oriental Hotel, on the southwest corner of Osmond Terrace and Magill Road, locally heritage-listed in August 2000
- Robin Hood Hotel, 315 Portrush Road, present building built 1882 to replace an earlier one licensed in 1845; locally heritage-listed in August 2000

=== Other buildings ===
- Norwood Town Hall was heritage-listed on the SA Heritage Register in November 1985.
- Norwood Library is located on 110 The Parade, near the corner of Osmond Terrace, in the old Kensington and Norwood Institute building, which was heritage-listed in 1981 on the South Australian Heritage Register. The institute, designed by government architect W. H. Abbott free of charge, and built in 1876, was one of many mechanics' institutes in Australia established during the 19th century. It was largely funded by its founding president, Sir Edwin Smith. In 1882 its collection, available for loan by subscriptions paid by members, was enhanced by books acquired from the Magill Institute after its demise. In 1883 extensions were added to the building, including a hall and reading room, and in 1895 it also had a musical program. In 1914 the library held 13,744 volumes, and 190 periodicals and newspapers, and an art school was opened in the building. In the 1950s the Institute supported the free lending of books, but fell into debt to the council. In 1977 the City of Kensington and Norwood acquired the building, and carried out renovations, retaining the library. In 1986 the institute was dissolved, setting up a Friends of the Library group as the building becoming the responsibility of the council. The building was refurbished in period style and became Norwood Library.
- The former Norwood Baptist Church, on the south-eastern corner of Church Avenue and The Parade (no. 134), designed by architect James Cumming, built in 1869 by Charles Farr and opened in January 1870, was heritage-listed on the SA Heritage Register in 1982. Its classical style was particularly influenced by the Metropolitan Tabernacle in Newington Butts in London, where influential Baptist preacher Charles Spurgeon used to preach. The building contains one of the most significant church organs in South Australia, installed in 1882. Its use as a church ceased and for some time it housed the Mary Martin Bookshop, but that closed in the 2010s and has since been used as a restaurant.

== Churches ==
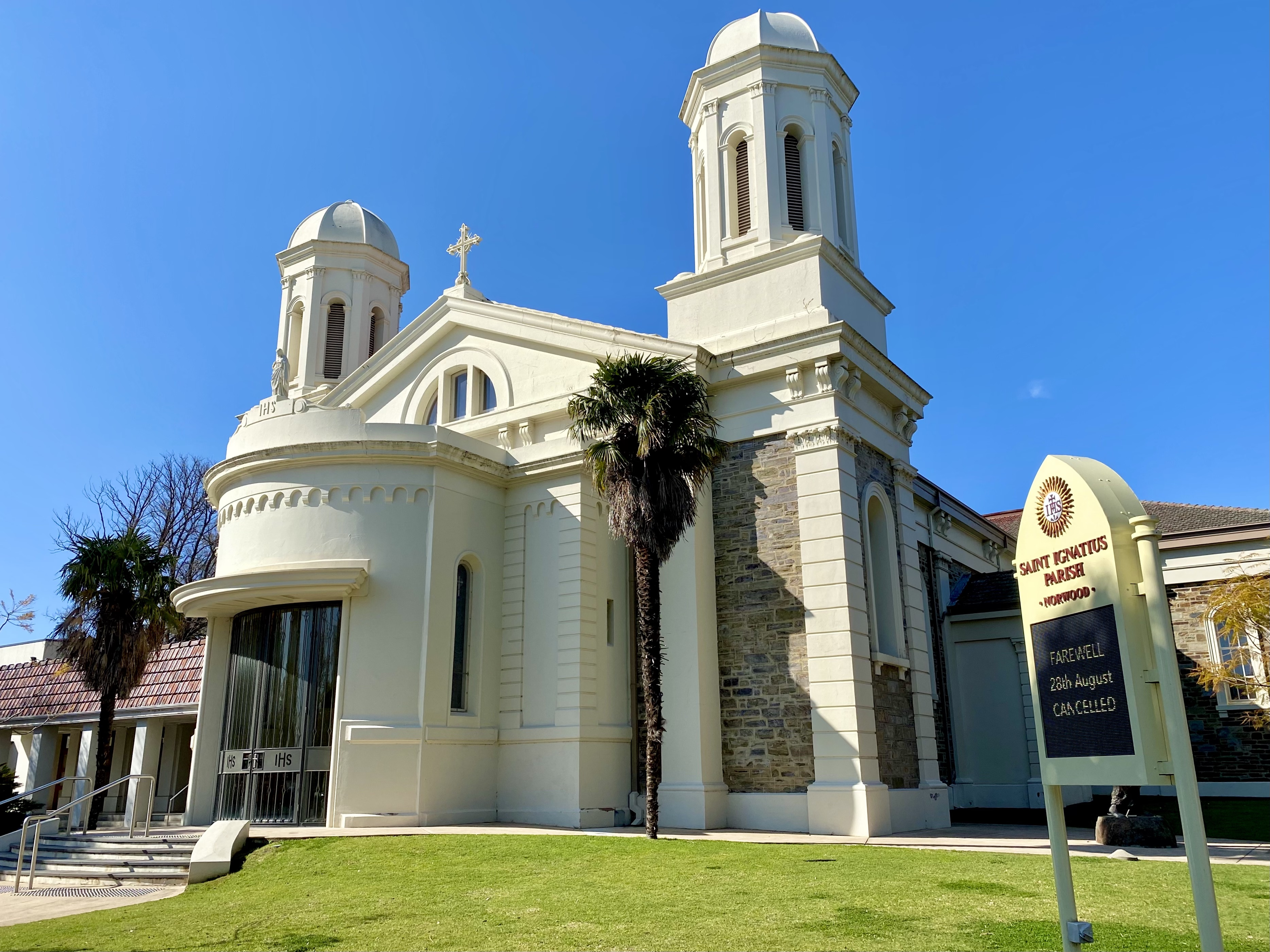
Saint Ignatius Church

Saint Ignatius Church is a Catholic parish church, built after land at the north-eastern corner of William and Queen Streets was purchased by the Society of Jesus (more commonly referred to as Jesuits) in 1869. The church was built in the Italianate style and opened in August 1870.

Saint Bartholomew's on Beulah Road in Norwood, also known as St Bart's Norwood, is "an Anglican church in the evangelical tradition that participates as a member of the Anglican Communion". It was for some years part of the Grace Anglican Network (created by St Bart's in 2016) with St Matthew's Church, Marryatville, but as of February 2022 is again independent.

The Unitarian Meeting House at 99 Osmond Terrace is an independent, self-governed church "affiliated with the worldwide Unitarian and Unitarian-Universalist free church movements". There was formerly a Unitarian church in Wakefield Street, Adelaide, but this was closed in the 1960s and meeting house in Norwood is the only one in South Australia.

== Schools ==
- Norwood Primary School, Osmond Terrace, which was designed and built by the same architect and builder as the Norwood Baptist Church, architect James Cumming and builder Charles Farr, as Norwood Public School in 1871.
- Saint Ignatius' College, junior campus
- The upper primary campus of St Joseph's Memorial School, catering for children, William Street, caters for Year 2 to Year 6 (junior primary, preschool to Year 1, is in Bridge Street, Kensington).

== Transport ==
Several Adelaide Metro bus routes serve the suburb. These are the main routes running through or adjacent to Norwood as of 2020:

- H30, H33: Magill Road
- H20, H21, H22, H23, H24, N22: The Parade
- 140, 141,142: Kensington Road
- 300: Suburban Connector (Portrush Road)

In addition to these, there are a number of school services running during term-time, and special services to Adelaide Oval for big events.

== Notable residents ==
- Reginald Blundell, politician
- C.J. Dennis, writer
- Bill Denny, politician
- Don Dunstan, former Premier of South Australia
- Antonio Giannoni, first Italian settler in South Australia
- May Gibbs, writer
- Max Harris, poet
- Lionel Hill, politician
- Mary Anne Lockwood (1858–1938), temperance worker and suffragist
- Mary MacKillop, Australia's first beatified saint
- Mary Martin, bookseller
- Sir Edwin Thomas Smith
- Catherine Helen Spence, women's rights campaigner
- Alexander Tolmer, former police officer and police commissioner
- Stanley Price Weir, public servant and Australian Army officer

== See also ==
- Electoral district of Norwood
- List of Adelaide suburbs
- Norwood Swimming Pool (in neighbouring Kensington)
- Woodroofe, a soft drink company
