= Norton Summit, South Australia =

Norton Summit
- Town
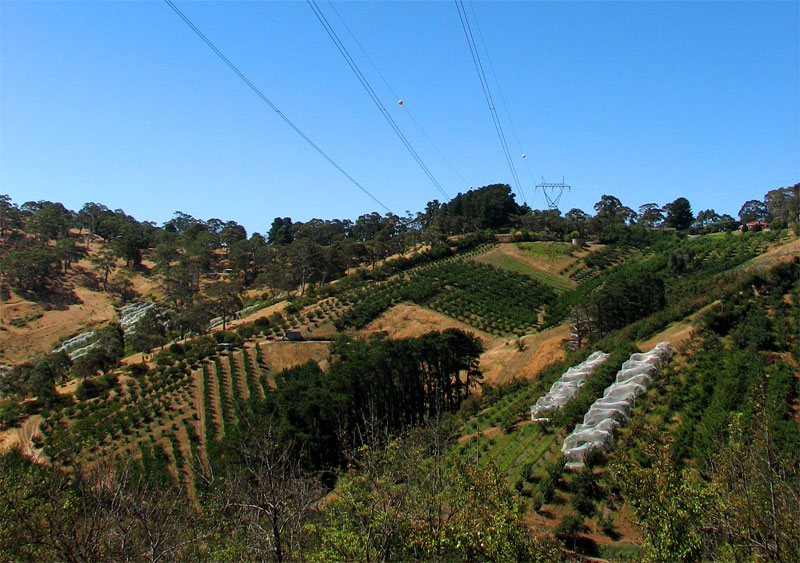
- Cherry orchards on the Norton Summit hills
- Interactive map of Norton Summit
- Coordinates: 34°55′0″S 138°43′0″E
- Country: Australia
- State: South Australia
- LGA: Adelaide Hills Council
- Location: 12 km (7.5 mi) from Adelaide

Government
  - State electorate: Morialta
  - Federal division: Mayo

Population
  - Total: 548 (SAL 2021)
- Postcode: 5136
Localities around Norton Summit
Woodforde	Montacute	Cherryville
Teringie	Norton Summit	Marble Hill
Horsnell Gully		Ashton

Norton Summit (formerly Norton's Summit) is a town in the Adelaide Hills, South Australia, located approximately 12 km east of the city of Adelaide. The town is named after Robert Norton, who arrived in South Australia shortly after its proclamation, and made the first recorded climb in the area in 1836.

It is well known for the popular Scenic Hotel, founded in the 1870s, often considered one of the best pubs in Adelaide. Another landmark is St. John's Church, founded with the assistance of the Baker family at around the same time.

The Morialta Protestant Children's Home was established in 1924 on nearby land, part of John Baker's estate, closed in 1972.

The Playford family have long been residents of the area. The Rev. Thomas Playford, a Waterloo veteran turned preacher, settled in the area in the 1840s. His son (Thomas Playford II) and great-grandson (Thomas Playford IV) both became Premier of South Australia. Thomas Playford IV is the longest serving Premier in South Australia's history, from 1938 to 1965. His statue stands in the centre of the township.

Norton Summit is one of the most popular cycling climbs in Australia.
