= Teringie, South Australia =

Teringie Adelaide, South Australia
- Coordinates: 34°54′50″S 138°41′46″E
- Population: 831 (SAL 2021)
- Postcode(s): 5072
- LGA(s): Adelaide Hills Council
- State electorate(s): Morialta
- Federal division(s): Mayo; Sturt
Suburbs around Teringie:
| Woodforde |
| Magill | Teringie |
| Auldana | Skye |

Teringie is a suburb of Adelaide in South Australia. It occupies a commanding position in the Adelaide Hills and overlooks the plains on which most of the city is built. Teringie's small number of houses (less than 100 in total) are mostly large, bush-covered blocks. The suburb is steadily growing with new houses popping up continually.

A large portion of the land was originally owned by RM Williams, remains of his original brick factory still form part of a residential property on Norton Summit Road, the now subdivided blocks still owned by descendants of RM Williams.

Other previous notable residents include:

Giuseppe Capogreco arrived in Australia in 1955 from Italy and purchased a parcel of land in Teringie for his wine making ventures. Capogreco's wines were initially produced for distribution within the local community, but as word of mouth spread over the years, the wine's reputation spread far and wide, and supply succumbed to the limits of production. Vineyards are still present and operating in the area today under the Teringie Estate Wines banner which has branched as far as China.

Harry Clisby – an engineer whose designs inspired Ferrari and assisted Jack Brabham's Formula One success. Mr Clisby built a large medieval castle style residence which included a miniature railway, almost rollercoaster. Mr Clisby built most of the residence himself which took over 15 years to complete.

Teringie was originally a private subdivision. The name was approved in 1978 by the Geographical Names Board in lieu of the original proposal of Teringie Heights following the stated preference of the local council. The name is of Aboriginal origin meaning place of beautiful birds.

The western end of the suburb comprises some higher density housing with still most residences being large and situated on larger than average land parcels. The further eastern part comprises mostly the larger bushland covered blocks some of which run into the large valleys.

The suburb is bordered to the north by Morialta Conservation Park and the south by suburbs, Norton Summit, Horsnell Gully, Skye and Auldana.

The notable power lines running overhead have created some controversy as some believe that they are detrimental to health.

Teringie is serviced by the East Torrens CFS – Ashton brigade.

A wealth of wildlife exists close by: koalas, kangaroos, possums, echidnas, and a great variety of birdlife including yellow-tail and red-tail black cockatoos.
