= Morialta Protestant Children's Home =

Morialta Protestant Children's Home was from 1924 to 1974 a residential care facility for orphans and neglected children in South Australia. It was built for John Baker, and is now a holiday camp owned by the United Church.

Norton Summit
1 Scenic Hotel
2 St John's Anglican Church
3 Morialta Barns
4 Morialta Children's Home

== History ==
"Morialta House" was built in 1847 for John Baker, who was appointed to the first Legislative Council of South Australia and succeeded Boyle Travers Finnis as Premier, but was ousted twelve days later. His son Richard Chaffey Baker, later "Sir Richard", inherited the property in 1872, and on his death in 1911, his son John Richard Baker inherited the 17-room mansion, with numerous out-buildings including servants' quarters, all on 125 acres (51 ha) of rich farming land near Norton Summit.

The South Australian Protestant Federation was founded in 1917 as a virulent anti-Catholic alliance.

Following the success of the (Catholic) Orphanages of St. Vincent de Paul in Gilberton, and Goodwood Park in the State, the Federation, whose secretary was Philip Vincent Colebatch, decided to purchase "Morialta" as a Protestant home for orphan and neglected children. He was, briefly, the first Superintendent of the Home, which opened in October 1924. with accommodation for 67 children. In 1929 another wing was opened, with beds for another 42 boys in three dormitories. By October 1932 56 boys and 37 girls were living at the Home.

Board of management consisted of three members, elected annually, from each of:

- S.A. Baptist Union,
- Congregational Union of S.A.,
- Presbyterian Churches in South Australia,
- Churches of Christ of S.A.,
- S.A. Protestant Federation,
- I.O.O.F. Lodge,
- Loyal Orange Institution
- Public Subscribers

Staff included a Head Gardener, to oversee the vegetable garden, orchard and dairy herd, and train the boys, who were expected to be useful as farm workers on leaving the Home. Similarly, the Matron oversaw the girls cooking, washing and mending in the expectation they would later be employed as domestic servants. All the children attended the Norton's Summit State School.

In 1934 the annual budget was £3,500 to feed, clothe and train the children. Income was derived from sale of produce, annual fetes held at the Town Hall, and donations from individuals and organisations.

== Documentary ==
In 1950 J. Campbell Dobbie (1900–1963) produced a film The Open Door on the Morialta Home.

== Current status ==
The property is owned by Youth with a Mission.
