= Mary Anne Lockwood =

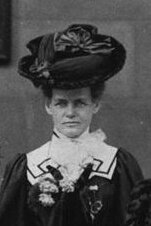
- Mary Lockwood (1900)
- Born: 4 February 1858; Norwood, South Australia
- Died: 1938 (aged 79–80); Australia
- Occupations: temperance activist; suffragist

Mary Anne Lockwood (1858–1938) was an Australian activist engaged in the temperance and suffrage movements. She held leadership roles in the Woman’s Christian Temperance Union (WCTU) of South Australia such as serving as the first president of the Yorke Peninsula District Union in 1892.

== Biography ==
Mary Ann (or Anne) Lockwood was born at Norwood, South Australia on 4 February 1858.

She was educated in a private school for girls.

Trained in temperance principles at home, she signed the temperance pledge at an early age at a Band of Hope meeting, and joined the WCTU in 1891. In the same year, she was elected corresponding secretary of the newly formed Yorketown local Union. In 1892, she was elected first president of the Yorke Peninsula District Union, holding that position for six years, until her removal to Adelaide.

At the Triennial Convention held in Queensland in 1897, she was elected honorary corresponding secretary of the Australasian WCTU, and at the same time, assistant editor and business manager of Our Federation, the official organ of that Union. In 1903, she was elected State secretary of the South Australian WCTU, and participated in the campaigns which secured six o’clock closing of drinking bars, the suffrage for women, and Local Option Polls.

She also engaged in the work associated with the 1907 purchase of St. Andrews Presbyterian Church and Hall, in Adelaide. Located in the central street of the city, the property served as the headquarters of the South Australian WCTU, and included ample office accommodations and residential quarters for travelers.

Lockwood was a delegate to a number of Australasian conventions in other States. In later years, she was active in several campaigns for Prohibition.

Lockwood died in Australia in 1938.

== Selected works ==
- "Rowntree and Sherwell's solution of the drink problem contrasted with WCTU principles", Our Federation, 15 May 1902
