= Jack Hombsch =

Australian rules footballer

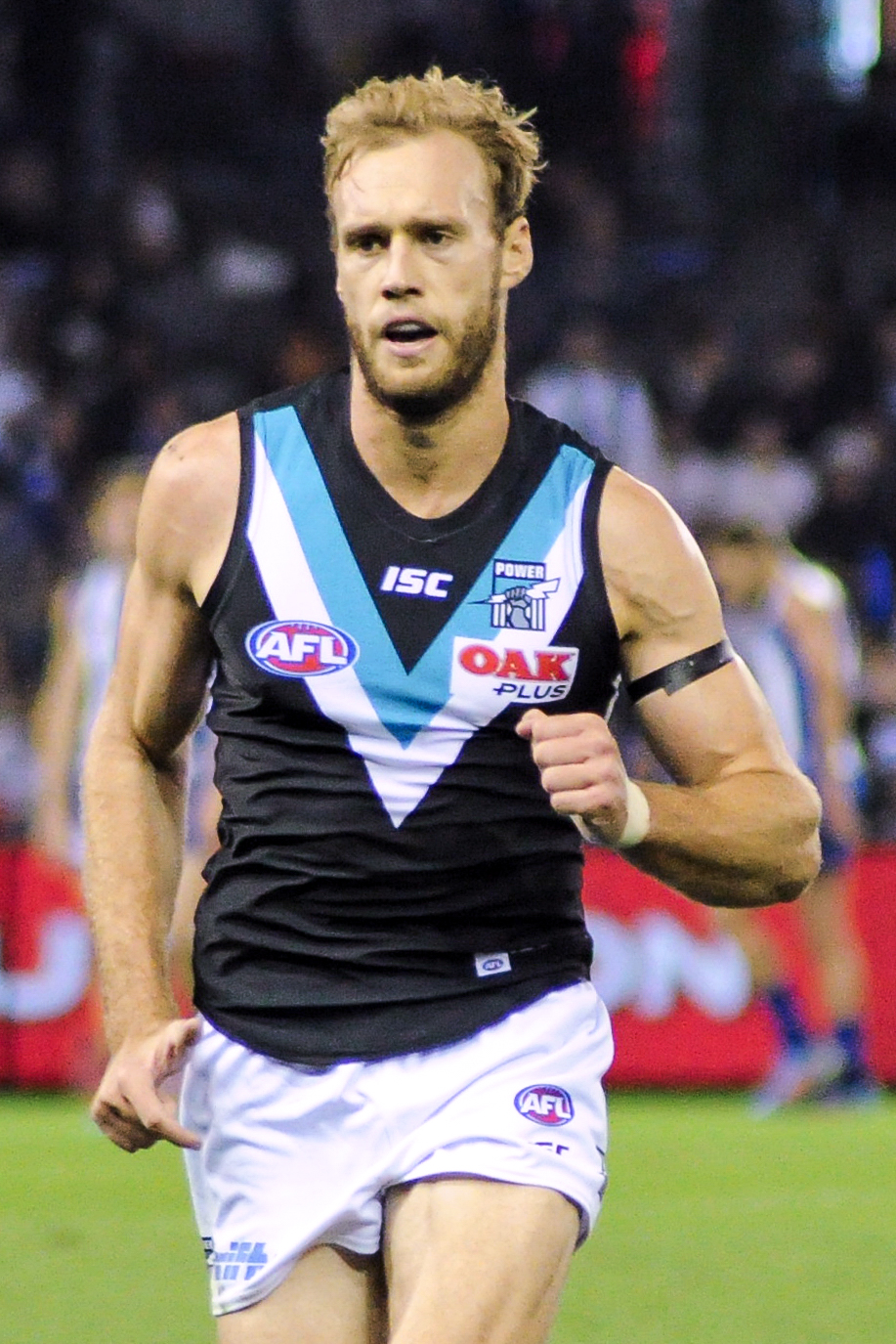
- Hombsch playing for Port Adelaide in April 2018

Personal information
- Born: 7 March 1993 (age 33)
- Original team: Roxby Downs (FNFL) / Rostrevor College / Sturt (SANFL)
- Height: 194 cm (6 ft 4 in)
- Weight: 90 kg (198 lb)
- Position: Defender

Playing career^{1}
Years	Club	Games (Goals)
2012	Greater Western Sydney	9 (0)
2013–2018	Port Adelaide	89 (1)
2019–2021	Gold Coast	18 (0)
Total		116 (1)
- ^{1} Playing statistics correct to the end of 2019.

Career highlights
- 22under22 team: 2015; Inaugural Greater Western Sydney Team; 3× John McCarthy Medal (Community Award); Jim Stynes Community Leadership Award: 2017

Jack Hombsch (born 7 March 1993) is a former professional Australian rules footballer who played for the Gold Coast Football Club in the Australian Football League (AFL). An alumnus of Rostrevor College, he was one of Greater Western Sydney's underage recruits, and played in their inaugural side for their debut season in 2012.

Hombsch was traded to the Port Adelaide Football Club alongside Jake Neade during the 2012 season Trade Week. Hombsch made his debut for Port in round 10 of the 2013 AFL season against the Western Bulldogs in Darwin, tallying 22 possessions.

In season 2014, Hombsch consolidated himself into Port's AFL squad playing predominantly in the backlines as a tall defender in 24 games including finals. Hombsch continued where he left off playing in 22 games in 2015 and finishing third in the John Cahill Medal at season's end.

In 2017, Hombsch won the Jim Stynes Community Leadership Award for his work with Inclusive Sport SA, Bedford and Kickstart for Kids. Hombsch acts as an ambassador for organisations dedicated to engaging those living with intellectual disabilities. It came with a $20,000 prize to be distributed to a charity of his choice.

At the conclusion of the 2018 season, Hombsch was traded to the Gold Coast Suns, where he played until his final season in 2021 before retiring.
