= Bert Tobin =

Australian cricketer

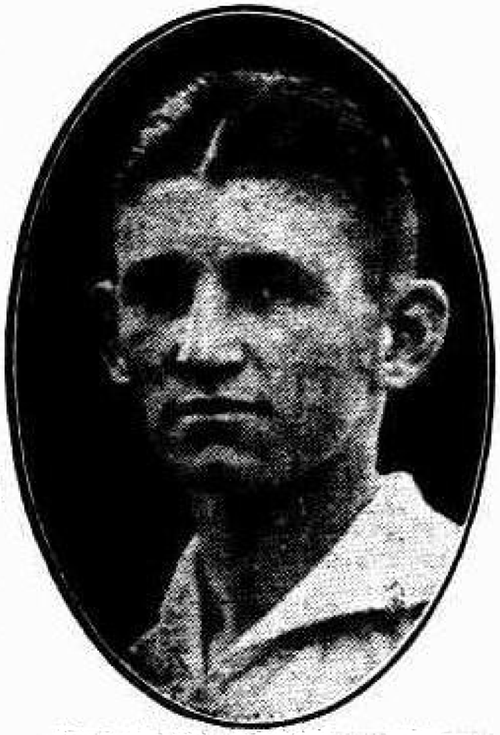

Personal information
- Full name: Bertrandt Joseph Tobin
- Born: 11 November 1910; North Adelaide, South Australia
- Died: 19 October 1969 (aged 58); Adelaide, South Australia
- Height: 6 ft 2 in (1.88 m)
- Batting: Right-handed
- Bowling: Right-arm fast-medium
- Role: All-rounder

Domestic team information
- Years: Team
- 1930-31 to 1930-34: South Australia

Career statistics
Competition	First-class
Matches	26
Runs scored	722
Batting average	16.04
100s/50s	0/4
Top score	61
Balls bowled	3667
Wickets	51
Bowling average	39.03
5 wickets in innings	0
10 wickets in match	0
Best bowling	4/31
Catches/stumpings	17/0
- Source: Cricinfo, 27 November 2019

Bertrandt Joseph Tobin (11 November 1910 – 19 October 1969) was a cricketer who played first-class cricket for South Australia from 1930 to 1935.

== Life and career ==
The son of a railway official, Bert Tobin lived in North Adelaide. He was educated at Rostrevor College in Adelaide from 1925 to 1928, boarding in his final two years. He was a prominent member of the school's cricket and football teams. He won the South Australian Junior Golf Championship in 1928.

A hard-hitting batsman in the middle or lower order and a fast-medium opening bowler, Tobin stood six feet two inches tall. He made his first-class debut for South Australia in the 1930–31 season just before his 20th birthday. He took his best first-class figures of 4 for 31 against Victoria in the Sheffield Shield in November 1932, when he and Tim Wall dismissed Victoria for 92 and South Australia won by three wickets. He made his highest first-class score of 61 in the next match, against New South Wales.

Despite his good form it was a surprise when he was selected in the Australian team for the Fourth Test against England later that season, as his overall achievements had been moderate: "a useful rather than a match-winning figure in South Australian cricket". He probably owed his selection to his ability to bowl bouncers. In the event he was made twelfth man and was not selected for Australia again.

During his South Australian career Tobin worked in the Adelaide sports store part-owned by the cricketer Philip Lee. He left Australia in 1935 to play as a professional for Rishton in the Lancashire League. He remained in the UK, marrying a rich woman and playing club cricket in Scotland. After two decades abroad he returned to Australia, coaching cricket in the Melbourne suburb of Essendon and in Alice Springs.
