= Lindsay Simmons =

Australian politician

Member for Morialta
- In office 18 March 2006 – 20 March 2010
- Preceded by: Joan Hall
- Succeeded by: John Gardner

Personal details
- Born: Lindsay Anne Simmons; 7 January 1954 (age 72)
- Party: Labor Party

Lindsay Anne Simmons (born 7 January 1954) is a former Australian politician, representing the South Australian House of Assembly seat of Morialta for Labor from 2006 to 2010.

== Early life ==
Simmons was born in the United Kingdom. She has a Bachelor of Arts degree, a Certificate in Education, a master's degree in psychology, and is a Justice of the Peace. After university, she taught in a large comprehensive school in inner London, before becoming headmistress of St Marys Convent in Cambridge.

After emigrating to South Australia, she taught at both St Ignatius Secondary School and St Francis of Assisi Junior Schools before making a change to health, community and disability sectors. She has been CEO of the Playgroup Association of SA, Blind Welfare Association, Cystic Fibrosis Association, Autism SA and State Manager of Council on the Ageing.

Simmons has also represented South Australia on many national bodies, including state representative on the National Women's Consultative Committee and National Council for International Year of the Family. She is also a former lay member of the Equal Opportunity Tribunal. Simmons has three children.

== Parliament ==
Simmons first ran as a Labor candidate for the division of Sturt against Liberal incumbent Christopher Pyne at the 2001 federal election but was unsuccessful. Generally occupying the same area as Sturt, the new state seat of Morialta to replace Coles was won by Liberal incumbent Joan Hall on a two-party vote of 54.1 percent at the 2002 election. Simmons contested the seat for Labor at the 2006 election and defeated Hall with 57.9 percent of the two-party vote from a 12 percent swing. It was the first time a Labor candidate had won Morialta or Coles since Des Corcoran at the 1975 election.

Simmons' major Committee contribution was on the Social Development Committee, chaired by Ian Hunter, which spanned her time in parliament. Simmons also served on the Statutory Officers Committee, the Standing Orders Committee, and the Public Works Committee.

In 2009 Simmons lobbied the South Australian Government and the Department of Environment and Heritage to secure a portion of land located adjacent to the Morialta Conservation Park to be purchased to become part of the park. She was successful with the purchase taking place later that year.

Simmons was defeated at the 2010 election by Liberal Party candidate John Gardner who received 54.1 percent of the two-party vote from an 11.1 percent swing.
