= Antonio Giannoni =

Italian emigrant (1814–1883)

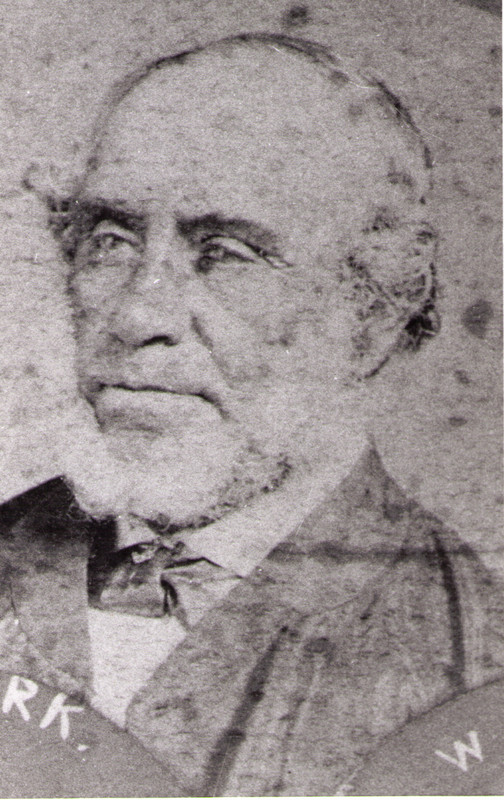
- Born: March 29, 1814; Rimini, Italy
- Died: September 6, 1883 (aged 69); Kensington, Adelaide

Antonio Giannoni (29 March 1814 – 6 September 1883) was the first Italian to settle in South Australia. He arrived in Port Adelaide on 19 September 1839.

== Early life ==
Giannoni was born on 29 March 1814 in Rimini, Italy, the son of Petro and Maria (née Gambuti). He did not receive any formal education in Rimini, but received much experience in seamanship. Giannoni left Rimini in around 1838, after narrowly evading arrest for being a member of the Young Italy movement. He fled to England and is recorded as a crewman on the English ships Mount Edgecombe and Sabina in 1838 and 1839 respectively.

== Career ==
On 3 May 1839, he boarded the London-based Recovery which arrived in South Australia on 19 September 1839. He was hired to work at the Survey Department by Surveyor General Lieutenant Edward Charles Frome, whom Giannoni had become acquainted with while on the Recovery. In early 1841, Giannoni left Adelaide after the Survey Department retrenched him and found employment as an oarsmen for a whale fishery at Encounter Bay. He worked as a whaler for some seven years, returning to Adelaide in 1848, where he started a modestly successful land-owning enterprise. Like many other immigrants, he left for the goldfields near Mount Alexander and Castlemaine during the 1851 gold rush. Giannoni became a cab driver some time in 1861 and then a bus driver in 1873; he returned to the cab industry in 1878, following the introduction of trams in South Australia.

== Personal life and death ==
On 13 November 1848, Giannoni married domestic worker Matilda (née Deputron), who died of tuberculosis on 5 February 1854. After the death of his first wife, Giannoni remarried on 16 August 1954, but his second wife Ann (née Tickner) died in childbirth on 27 May 1855. Two months later, on 27 July, he married Tickner's friend, Mary (née Clapton), who had emigrated to England with her. Giannoni and Clapton had five children: Antonio (1856–1942); Samuel (1859–1941); Mary (1861–1916); Peter (1863–1947); and a fifth child, also named Samuel, who died three days after his birth in 1857. His son Peter was later elected to a two-year term as mayor of Kensington.

Giannoni died on 6 September 1883 in Kensington, Adelaide. The cause of death was listed as "old age and disease of the bladder". He was buried at the West Terrace cemetery.

Giannoni, who had only learnt how to properly sign documents in his 40s, spelled his surname inconsistently, including as "Gianoni", "Gannone", and "Gannoni", the last of which was adopted in both Giannoni's final will and by his descendants who nonetheless continued to pronounce it as "Giannoni".

== Legacy ==
A bust of Giannoni in Osmand Terrace, Norwood was unveiled on 4 November 1993. A portrait of him, photographed in 1872, still exists too.
