= St Ignatius' Church, Norwood =

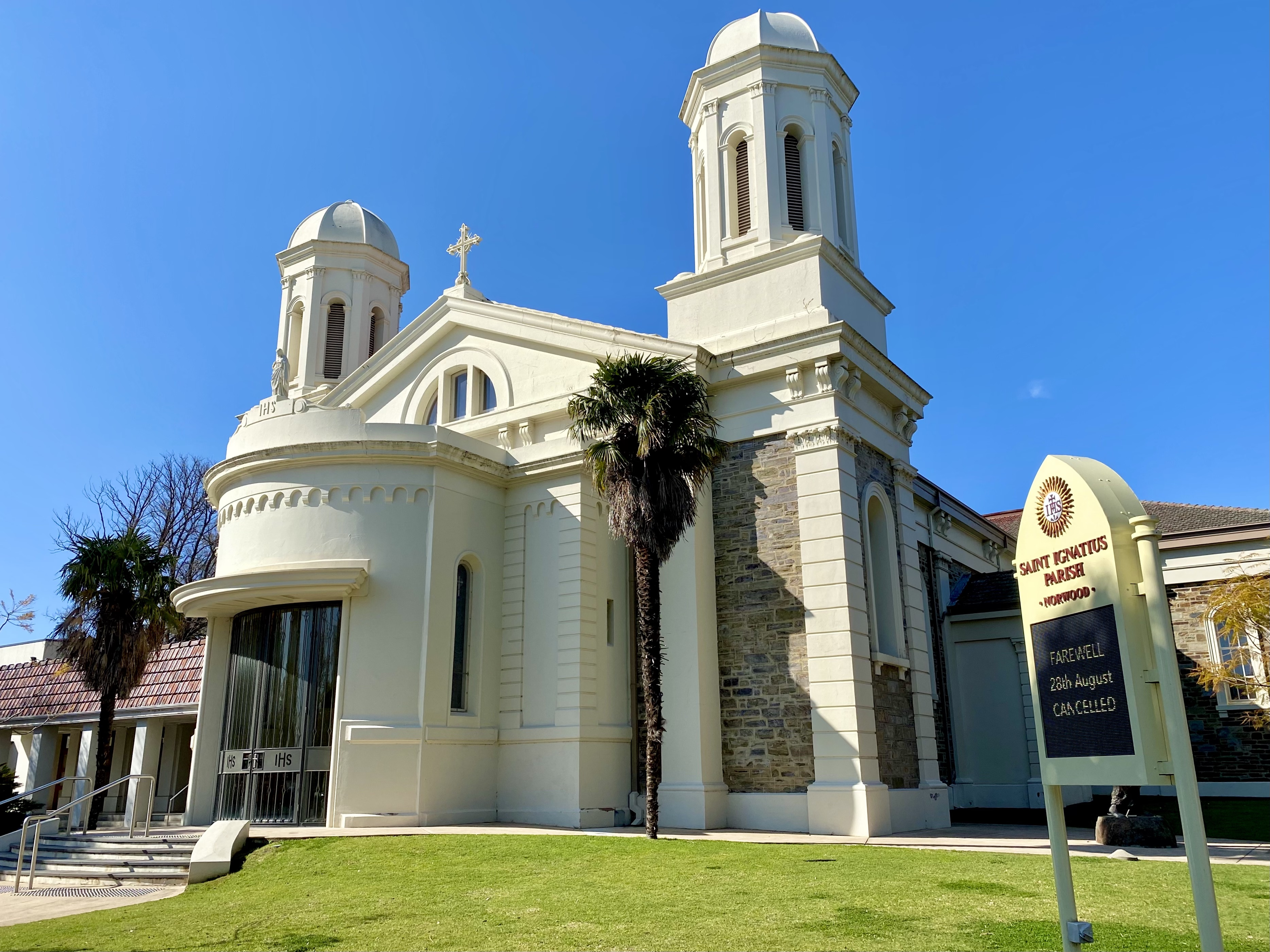
- Saint Ignatius Church
- Address: Queen Street, Norwood, South Australia
- Country: Australia
- Denomination: Catholic Church
- Religious order: Society of Jesus
- Website: norwoodparish.org.au

History
- Status: Church
- Founded: 17 October 1869
- Founder(s): Very Rev. Vicar General, J. Smyth
- Dedication: St Ignatius of Loyola
- Dedicated: 7 August 1870

Architecture
- Architectural type: Church
- Style: Victorian Italianate
- Years built: 1869 – 1870

Specifications
- Materials: Glen Osmond stone; cement; timber; Mintaro slate

Administration
- Archdiocese: Adelaide

St Ignatius' Church, Norwood is a Catholic Church located in the Adelaide suburb of Norwood, Australia. It is dedicated in honour of St Ignatius of Loyola, the founder of the Jesuits, the order of priests who founded the Church and have always and continue to administer the parish, on behalf of the Archdiocese of Adelaide.

== History ==
In September 1869 the Jesuits purchased a property owned by Charles Draper and known as Cannonbury House, at the corner of William and Queen Streets in Norwood. At that time, it consisted of a large block of land with a brick house of eight rooms, kitchen, lean-to, stable, coach house, garden and paddock.

The church was constructed on part of that large block of land and was dedicated on 7 August 1870. It was large and imposing, rectangular, built in the Victorian Italianate style with two towers topped by crosses at the entrance.

At this time Father Joseph Tappeiner SJ, close friend and advisor to St Mary Mackillop, moved to the Parish from Sevenhill. At the same time, Mackillop was excommunicated from the Catholic Church by Bishop Shiel. During this time, Mackillop rented a house diagonally across William Street from the Church. Some Jesuit priests at the Church provided Communion to her in secret. In 1872, Mackillop's excommunication was lifted, and she first celebrated Mass again in the Norwood Church. The Church has continued to have a long association with Mackillop and her Sisters of St Joseph of the Sacred Heart up until the current day.

In 1891 a bell, known as the Angelus bell, was installed, imported from Ireland and purchased by a Mr Delano, a prominent parishioner.

In 1897 an organ was installed in memory of Fr Joseph Peters S.J., who served at the parish from 1874 until his death in 1895.

In 1925 a Lourdes grotto was constructed on the grounds of the Church which remains there today. In 1929, Count O’Loughlin donated three marble statues to the parish. The statue of St Bernadette of Lourdes is still at the grotto. The statues of Saint Ignatius and Saint Francis Xavier were inside the church for a time but are now on the Bellarmine Lawns at Saint Ignatius' College's Athelstone campus and the garden to the rear of Manresa (the priests' residence at Norwood) respectively.

The 1954 Adelaide earthquake caused the cross on top of the northern tower to be dislodged. Parish priest Fr Thomas Costelloe SJ decided to remove the cross from the southern tower rather than repair the other.

The transepts, completed in 1954, doubled the capacity of the church. At this time, the sanctuary and sacristy were enlarged, and an altar rail measuring 25 m spanned the width of the church.

In 2017 a distinctive sculpture of St Ignatius as a pilgrim was completed and stands outside the entrance to the church.

During 2019 a new sanctuary window, new pews and carpeting, along with marble high altar, marble blessed altar, lectern and baptismal font were installed.

== School ==
The Church is associated with the neighbouring Saint Ignatius' College, Adelaide, which is also administered by the Australian Jesuits. It is also associated with the neighbouring Saint Joseph's Memorial School, which is administered by the Josephites. It is one of the first schools started by St Mary Mackillop, who had a close personal association with the Church from its very earliest days.

== See also ==
- Saint Ignatius' College, Adelaide
- Society of Jesus
