= John Gardner (Australian politician) =

Australian politician

The Honourable John Gardner
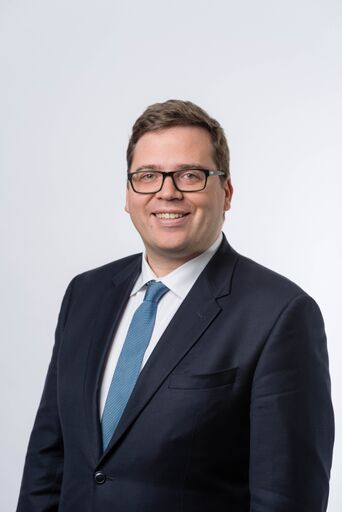

Deputy Leader of the Opposition in South Australia
- In office 19 April 2022 – 18 December 2024
- Leader: David Speirs; Vincent Tarzia
- Preceded by: Dan van Holst Pellekaan
- Succeeded by: Josh Teague

Deputy Leader of the South Australian Liberal Party
- In office 19 April 2022 – 18 December 2024
- Leader: David Speirs; Vincent Tarzia
- Preceded by: Dan van Holst Pellekaan
- Succeeded by: Josh Teague

Minister for Education
- In office 22 March 2018 – 21 March 2022
- Premier: Steven Marshall
- Preceded by: Susan Close (as Minister for Education and Child Development and as Minister for Higher Education and Skills)
- Succeeded by: Blair Boyer (as Minister for Education, Training and Skills)

Member of the South Australian House of Assembly for Morialta
- In office 20 March 2010 – 20 March 2026
- Preceded by: Lindsay Simmons
- Succeeded by: Matthew Marozzi

Personal details
- Born: John Anthony William Gardner; 9 February 1979 (age 47) Rose Park, South Australia
- Party: South Australian Liberal Party
- Education: University of Adelaide

John Anthony William Gardner (born 9 February 1979) is a former Australian Liberal politician who represented the seat of Morialta in the South Australian House of Assembly from 2010 until retiring from politics at the 2026 state election. Gardner served as the Minister for Education in the Marshall ministry between March 2018 and March 2022.

== Political career ==
The new seat of Morialta to replace Coles was won by Liberal incumbent Joan Hall on a two-party vote of 54.1 percent at the 2002 election. Labor's Lindsay Simmons defeated Hall at the 2006 election with 57.9 percent of the two-party vote, an 11.2-point post-redistribution swing. Gardner defeated Simmons at the 2010 election, receiving 54.1 percent of the two-party vote, an 11.1-point post-redistribution swing. He increased his two-party vote to 60 percent at the 2014 election.

Gardner had previously been a senior staffer for Christopher Pyne, Liberal MP for the federal seat of Sturt. Gardner lives in his childhood suburb of Rostrevor within the electorate of Morialta.

In January 2016 Gardner was appointed Shadow Minister for Education, Multicultural affairs and Arts.

After Deputy Liberal Leader Dan van Holst Pellekaan lost his seat at the 2022 South Australian state election, Gardner was elected Deputy Leader in his place, and hence Deputy Leader of the Opposition.

South Australian House of Assembly
Preceded by Lindsay Simmons	Member for Morialta; 2010–2026	Succeeded by Matthew Marozzi
Political offices
Preceded by Susan Close as Minister for Education and Child Development and as Minister for Higher Education and Skills	Minister for Education; 2018–2022	Succeeded by Blair Boyer as Minister for Education, Training and Skills)
Preceded by Dan van Holst Pellekaan	Deputy Leader of the Opposition in South Australia; 2022–2024	Succeeded by Josh Teague
Party political offices
Preceded by Dan van Holst Pellekaan	Deputy Leader of the South Australian Liberal Party; 2022–2024	Succeeded by Josh Teague
