= Magill, South Australia =

Magill
- Suburb
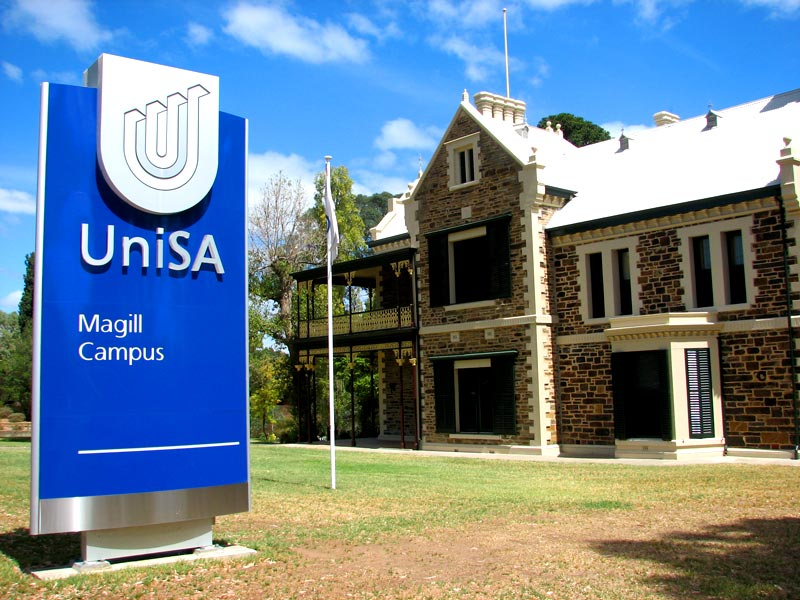
- UniSA Magill Campus

- Coordinates: 34°54′32″S 138°40′33″E
- Country: Australia
- State: South Australia
- City: Adelaide
- LGAs: City of Burnside; City of Campbelltown
- Established: 1838

Population
  - Total: 9,693 (SAL 2021)
- Postcode: 5072
Suburbs around Magill
Hectorville	Hectorville, Rostrevor	Rostrevor
Tranmere	Magill	Woodforde
Kensington Gardens	Rosslyn Park	Auldana

Magill is a suburb of Adelaide straddling the City of Burnside and City of Campbelltown council jurisdictions, approximately 7 km east of the Adelaide CBD. It incorporates the suburb previously known as Koongarra Park.

== History ==
Before the colonisation of South Australia in 1836, the land called Magill (formerly known as Makgill) was occupied by the Kaurna people. The Kaurna people, the Traditional Owners of the Adelaide Plains, were the first to live in this area and have cared for the land for thousands of years. Before Magill was established in 1838, the area was a woodland with widely spaced gums over native grasses and some small shrubs. In 1836 it is believed there were around seven hundred Kaurna people in the area.

The suburb of Magill was first established as the 524-acre (2.12 km^{2}) Makgill Estate, owned by two Scotsmen, Robert Cock and William Ferguson, who met en route to the newly founded colony of South Australia when sailing out from Portsmouth on HMS Buffalo. They formed a partnership as a carrier and merchant following their arrival on 28 December 1836, and purchased Section 285, which was named after Cock's trustee, David M. Makgill. The estate's homestead was built in 1838 by Ferguson, who was charged with farming the estate. Soon after farming commenced the two were short of cash, and thus Magill became the first foothill village to be subdivided. The area surrounding the original Magill village was initially characterised by large estates set amidst vineyards and orchards, particularly to the north of Magill Road: the blocks of the first subdivisions to the south were also large enough for the planting of orchards. The name Makgill was changed to Magill in the late 1940s, for reasons unknown.

The suburb has several buildings dating back to early colonial time. Business development is centred at the intersection of Magill, St Bernards and Penfold Roads. Magill was early considered the centre of a district characterised by vineyards and orchards. Hills people travelled along Magill Road to and from the town (Adelaide). There were a range of services within the village such as a blacksmith, tearooms, chaff mill, hotels, butchery and post office. It became a hub of activity and a favoured settlement. Within a decade a population of carters, farm labourers, stonemasons, plasterers and carpenters settled there. Most of the houses were made of stone from Captain Duff ’s quarry at Woodforde to the north-east or small quarries in the hills south-east.

== Description ==
Geographically the suburb straddles two councils, with its northern portion within the City of Campbelltown and the southern part within the City of Burnside boundary. The area is close to the foothills of the Mount Lofty Ranges and encompasses part of the Third Creek.

Magill is home to one of the Penfolds Wineries, the University of South Australia Magill Campus and the historic Murray Park Estate. The Murray home, set in 22 acres of land, was later acquired by the South Australian government and became the core of the Murray Park College of Advanced Education in 1973, after Wattle Park Teachers College, located nearby on Kensington Road, Wattle Park was sold to become a retirement village. Murray Park College of Advanced Education would soon become the Magill Campus of the University of South Australia.

The Magill Training Centre was situated in the area on Glen Stuart Road. Originally a Government reform school that was built in 1867. It was closed in 2012 and the land sold for housing.

== Schools ==
Magill has three educational institutions: Magill Primary School on Magill Road; Norwood International High School on The Parade; and UniSA Magill Campus on St Bernards Road.
