= Woodforde, South Australia =

Woodforde
- Suburb
- Country: Australia
- State: South Australia
- City: Adelaide
- LGA: Adelaide Hills Council
- Location: 10 km (6.2 mi) from Adelaide city centre

Government
  - State electorate: Morialta
  - Federal divisions: Mayo; Sturt

Area
  - Total: 4.6 km^{2} (1.8 sq mi)

Population
  - Total: 1,024 (SAL 2021)
- Postcode: 5072
Suburbs around Woodforde
| Rostrevor | Rostrevor | Montacute |
| Magill | Woodforde | Norton Summit |
| Teringie | Teringie | Norton Summit |

Woodforde is a suburb of Adelaide within the Adelaide Hills Council. It is located about 10 km east of the Adelaide city centre. Woodforde is in the State House of Assembly Electoral district of Morialta and is in the Federal Division of Mayo.

== History ==
Lake Hamilton Post Office opened on 1 April 1880 and was renamed Woodforde later that year before closing in 1882.

== Nomenclature ==
The original estate (spelled "Woodford") of 134 acres (54 ha) was owned by John Hallett, who came from Woodford in Essex, and where his mother died. The popular spelling with a final "e" reflects the belief that it was somehow named for Dr. John Woodforde, who came out on the Rapid in 1838 with Colonel Light, and was later appointed City Coroner. Geoff Manning agrees, but points out that Captain John Finlay Duff, who in 1850 laid out the subdivision of Hallett's section 342, Hundred of Adelaide, called it "The Village of Woodforde"', and so it appears in early conveyancing documents and in an advertisement (as "New Woodforde") in The Register on 28 August 1850.

== Facilities and attractions ==
The Catholic boys' school Rostrevor College is located in the suburb.

An area within the suburb is called Hamilton Hill. There is a large recreation park and reserve that took six years to develop, which transformed an abandoned council dump and a neglected scrub area into a facility for the community. In May 2024 the Adelaide Hills Council named the park the Lewis Yarlupurka O'Brien Reserve, in honour of the oldest living Kaurna elder, Lewis Yarlupurka O'Brien.
