= Matthew Marozzi =

Australian politician

Matthew Marozzi MP

Member of the South Australian House of Assembly for Morialta
- Incumbent
- Assumed office 21 March 2026
- Preceded by: John Gardner

Personal details
- Born: Matthew Marozzi; 1986 or 1987 (age 38–39)
- Party: Labor

Matthew John Marozzi (born 1986 or 1987) is an Australian politician, and has represented the district of Morialta in the South Australian House of Assembly since the 2026 state election. Marozzi is a member of the Australian Labor Party, and previously worked as an advisor to Zoe Bettison.

== Life and career ==
Marozzi attended primary school in the suburb of Payneham, and played in junior football premierships at Payneham Norwood Union.

Marozzi stood in the 2022 state election for Labor in the district of Morialta. He had previously worked in the office of a number of Labor senators, including Marielle Smith and Alex Gallacher. Despite a swing towards him, he was unsuccessful in unseating Liberal incumbent John Gardner. As of 2024, Marozzi was a senior adviser in the office of state minister Zoe Bettison.

Marozzi was selected again as the Labor candidate in Morialta for the 2026 state election. Marozzi won the seat, becoming the MP for Morialta. He is a member of the Labor Right faction.

South Australian House of Assembly
Preceded by John Gardner	Member for Morialta; 2026–present	Incumbent
