= Joan Hall (Australian politician) =

Australian politician

Member for Coles
- In office 11 December 1993 – 8 February 2002
- Preceded by: Jennifer Cashmore
- Succeeded by: Electorate abolished

Member for Morialta
- In office 9 February 2002 – 18 March 2006
- Preceded by: New electorate
- Succeeded by: Lindsay Simmons

Personal details
- Born: Joan Lynette Bullock; 22 December 1946 (age 79)
- Party: Liberal Party

Joan Lynette Hall (née Bullock; born 22 December 1946) is a former member of the South Australian House of Assembly, serving in the electoral district of Coles from 1993 to 2002 and the renamed electoral district of Morialta from 2002 to 2006.

The wife of former premier, Liberal Movement leader, and Australian Senator Steele Hall, she met Hall while working as his secretary during his time as a state MP in the 1960s and 1970s. Later, she was a staffer to then Opposition Leader Dean Brown before entering parliament as the member for the Adelaide Hills seat of Coles at the 1993 election, the same election that saw Brown become premier.

A moderate like her husband, Hall felt chagrin that Brown did not promote her to the ministry after the Liberals' landslide 1993 victory. When Industry Minister John Olsen, leader of the conservative wing of the state Liberal Party, decided to challenge Brown's leadership, Hall threw her support to him, giving Olsen the numbers to successfully challenge Brown for the Premiership. Under Olsen, she was Minister for Youth and Employment from December 1997, then Minister for Tourism from October 1998. She won party pre-selections in 2002 and 2006 despite claims of "interference in a preselection by Federal Members" by both herself and her husband.

Whilst serving as Tourism Minister, Hall was involved in bringing the Tour Down Under, the Clipsal 500, The Le Mans Race of 1000 years, the National Wine Centre and the 2007 Police and Fire Games to South Australia. In October 2001, she resigned from the ministry due to a conflict of interest in her handling of the Hindmarsh Soccer Stadium redevelopment.

On a margin of 4 percent from the previous election, Hall suffered a 12 percent swing in Morialta at the 2006 election, which saw her lose the seat to Labor candidate Lindsay Simmons. Moderate candidate John Gardner reclaimed the seat for the Liberals at the 2010 election with an 11 percent swing.

== Notes ==
South Australian House of Assembly
Preceded by Jennifer Cashmore	Member for Coles; 1993–2002	District abolished
District created	Member for Morialta; 2002–2006	Succeeded by Lindsay Simmons
