= Electoral district of Morialta =

South Australian state electoral district

Morialta South Australia—House of Assembly
- Interactive map of electoral district boundaries from the 2022 state election (Note: The electorate will have no change in boundaries at the 2026 state election.)
- State: South Australia
- Created: 2002
- MP: Matthew Marozzi
- Party: Labor
- Namesake: Morialta
- Electors: 27,235 (2026)
- Area: 41.5 km^{2} (16.0 sq mi)
- Demographic: Metropolitan
- Coordinates: 34°53′32″S 138°41′24″E
Electorates around Morialta:
	Newland	Schubert
Hartley	Morialta	Heysen
Bragg	Bragg	Heysen

Morialta is a single-member electoral district for the South Australian House of Assembly. Morialta covers residential and rural suburbs directly below and up into the Adelaide Hills to the east of Adelaide. It is a 41.5 km^{2} electorate which includes the suburbs of Athelstone, Auldana, Highbury, Newton, Rostrevor, Teringie, Vista, Woodforde, and also part of Magill, and Montacute.

Morialta is a word derived from the Kaurna language, originally thought to be marri-yartalla, "marri" meaning east and yertala meaning "flowing water". More recent research has shown that the etymology of the word is marri, meaning "east" and probably yarta, meaning "land, earth, country", or possibly yalta, meaning "cool, fresh, airy"; therefore, probably meaning "eastern land or country". The land used by the Morialta Conservation Park was traditionally occupied by the Kaurna people.

== History ==
Morialta was the new name adopted in 2002 for the electoral district of Coles, which was first created at the 1970 election and represented over the years by several distinguished MPs, including former Dunstan Labor government Attorney General Len King, and former premier Des Corcoran.

Morialta originally contained the outer suburbs due east of the city from Auldana north to Athelstone, along with a larger area of lightly populated hinterland extending 10 kilometres east to Cherryville. The redistribution transferred part of Paradise to Hartley in the west, while a stretch of hills territory from Skye east to Basket Range was added from Bragg and Heysen.

Morialta was won at the 2002 election by Liberal minister Joan Hall, the last member for Coles, on a margin of 4.1 percent, suffering a -2.4 percent swing. At the 2006 election, Hall was thought likely to again hold the seat with a reduced margin, but was defeated by Labor candidate Lindsay Simmons amidst Labor's statewide landslide, receiving a 12 percent two-party preferred swing to finish with a 7.9 percent margin.

However, at the 2010 election there was a swing of 11.1 percent back to the Liberals, with candidate John Gardner defeating Simmons by a margin of 4.1 percent.

At the 2014 election the electorate was 356 km^{2} in size and stretched from the Adelaide Hills east of Cudlee Creek to the outer north-eastern suburbs of Adelaide, taking in the suburbs of Athelstone, Auldana, Highbury, Rostrevor,Teringie, Woodforde and localities of Ashton, Basket Range, Birdwood, Castambul, Cherryville, Cudlee Creek, Forest Range, Gumeracha, Kenton Valley, Lenswood, Lobethal, Marble Hill, Montacute, Mount Torrens, Norton Summit, Summertown and Uraidla, as well as part of Chain of Ponds.

At the 2018 election its western boundary was in the eastern suburbs and extended from Teringie and Woodforde in the south through Rostrevor to Highbury in the North. To the east, it extended for 20 kilometres through lightly populated Adelaide Hills territory as far as Lobethal and Birdwood. The redistribution had shifted the electorate's balance from the suburbs to the Adelaide Hills.

The 2020 redistribution removed from the electorate the expansive but lightly populated territory in the Adelaide Hills, which were transferred to Heysen which gained the area around Marble Hill, Kavel the area around Lobethal, and Schubert the area around Gumeracha and Birdwood, which accounted for 29% of the former enrolment. It was compensated with gains in the eastern metropolitan suburbs of Adelaide, with Newton and eastern Magill gained from Hartley and Auldana from Bragg.

== Members for Morialta ==
Member	Party	Term
Joan Hall	Liberal	2002–2006
Lindsay Simmons	Labor	2006–2010
John Gardner	Liberal	2010–2026
Matthew Marozzi	Labor	2026–present

== Election results ==
2026 South Australian state election: Morialta
Party	Candidate	Votes	%	±%
Labor	Matthew Marozzi	9,610	40.6	+4.5
Liberal	Scott Kennedy	5,974	25.2	−21.0
One Nation	Peter Ellery	4,343	18.3	+18.3
Greens	Jenn Tranter	2,695	11.4	+1.1
Family First	Rosie Cirocco	574	2.4	−5.0
Real Change	Janice Hutchison	314	1.3	+1.3
Australian Family	James Bodycote	98	0.4	+0.4
Fair Go	Casey Marley-Duncan	75	0.3	+0.3
Total formal votes		23,683	96.3	−0.6
Informal votes		904	3.7	+0.6
Turnout		24,587	90.3	−1.3
Two-party-preferred result
Labor	Matthew Marozzi	13,846	58.5	+9.9
Liberal	Scott Kennedy	9,836	41.5	−9.9
Labor gain from Liberal		Swing	+9.9	
