= Electoral district of Coles =

Former South Australian state electoral district (1970–2002)

Coles South Australia—House of Assembly
- State: South Australia
- Created: 1970
- Abolished: 2002
- Demographic: Metropolitan

Coles was an electoral district of the House of Assembly in the Australian state of South Australia from 1970 to 2002. The district was based in the eastern suburbs of Adelaide.

Coles was first contested at the 1970 election and was won by Labor's Len King as a marginal seat. King increased the Labor two-party margin to a fairly safe 9.2 percentat the 1973 election.

King retired before the 1975 election and was succeeded by Deputy Premier Des Corcoran, who transferred to Coles after his majority in Millicent was redistributed away. Corcoran won, though the Labor margin was pared down to a marginal 4.2 percent from a swing of five percent.

A boundary redistribution ahead of the 1977 election pushed the seat into Liberal-friendly territory in the Adelaide Hills. On these boundaries, the Liberals now held it with a margin of 3.8 percent. Believing this made Coles impossible to hold, Corcoran moved to the newly created neighbouring seat of Hartley. Liberal candidate Jennifer Adamson won the seat for the Liberals at the 1977 election.

Adamson picked up a large swing in the 1979 election as the Liberals won government, but was nearly defeated at the 1982 election. A boundary redistribution ahead of the 1985 election consolidated the Liberal hold on the seat by pushing it further into the Adelaide Hills, increasing the Liberal two-party margin from a marginal 1.3 percent to a safe 9 percent. Adamson, who was later known as Jennifer Cashmore, held the seat without serious difficulty until handing it to Joan Hall, wife of former premier Steele Hall, in 1993.

Coles was abolished and renamed Morialta ahead of the 2002 election.

== Members for Coles ==
Member	Party	Term
Len King	Labor	1970–1975
Des Corcoran	Labor	1975–1977
Jennifer Cashmore	Liberal	1977–1993
Joan Hall	Liberal	1993–2002
