= Auldana, South Australia =

Auldana
- Suburb
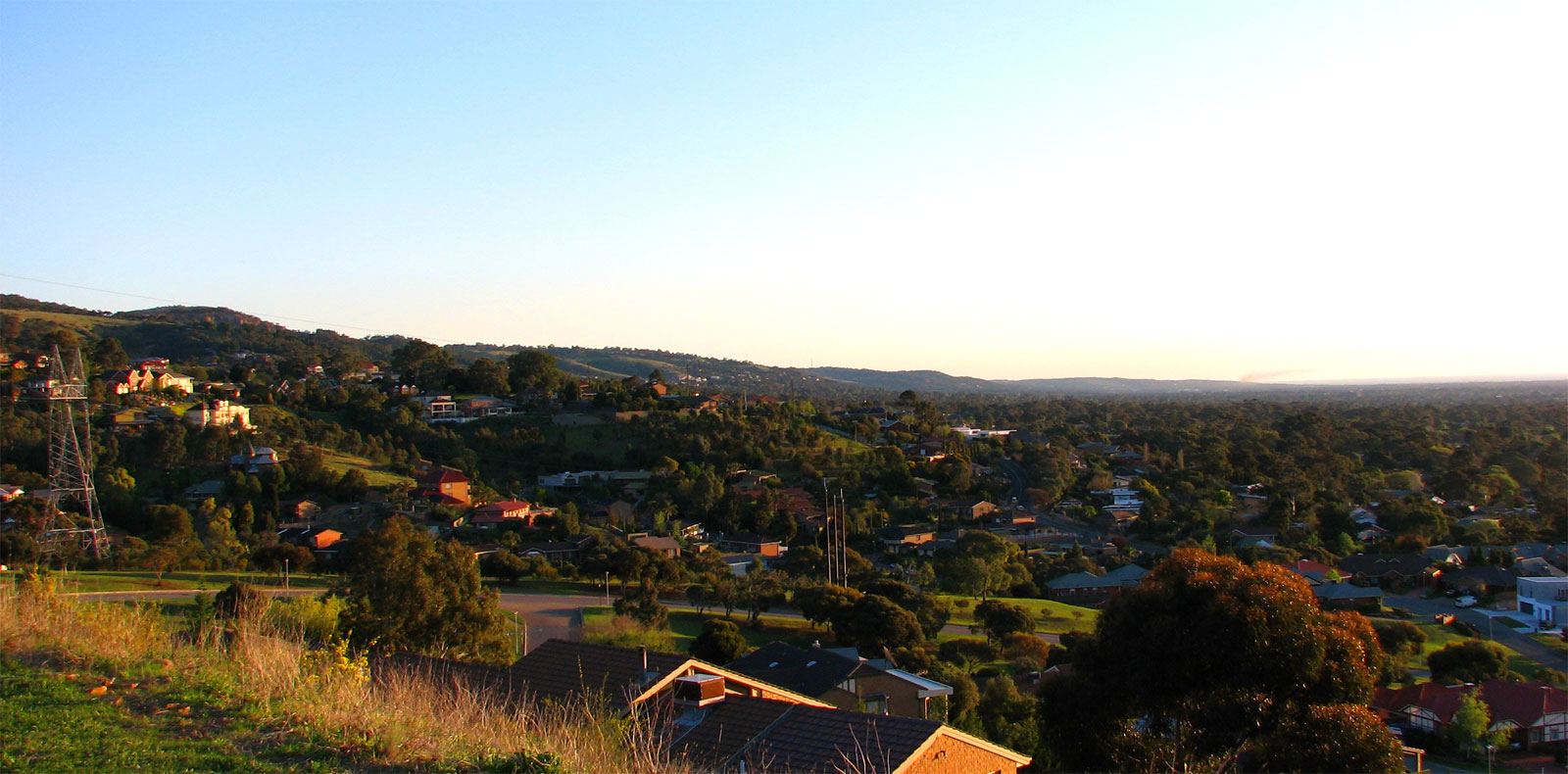
- Looking south along the Adelaide Hills from above Magill.

- Country: Australia
- State: South Australia
- City: Adelaide
- LGA: City of Burnside
- Location: 9 km (5.6 mi) from Adelaide
- Established: 1847

Government
  - State electorate: Morialta
  - Federal division: Sturt

Population
  - Total: 629 (SAL 2021)
- Postcode: 5072

Auldana is a suburb of Adelaide, South Australia in the City of Burnside. It stands on the site of a once-famous vineyard "Auldana" established by Patrick Auld in 1847. Many of the streets are named for grape varieties.
