= Kensington Gardens, South Australia =

Kensington Gardens
- Suburb
- Country: Australia
- State: South Australia
- City: Adelaide
- LGA: City of Burnside

Government
  - State electorate: Dunstan
  - Federal division: Sturt

Population
  - Total: 2,498 (SAL 2021)
- Postcode: 5068

Kensington Gardens is an eastern suburb of Adelaide, located within the City of Burnside. It includes a large recreational park, Kensington Wama, or Kensington Gardens Reserve.

== History ==
Inhabited by the Kaurna people before settlement by Europeans, the area became known as Pile's Paddock, after James Pile, who was born in the county of Yorkshire, England, in 1800 and arrived in South Australia in 1849.

Pile's Paddock was popular as a picnic ground for a long time, before part of the land was reserved as a public recreation ground in perpetuity, as originally suggested by a Mr H.J. Holden, a member of the Tramways Trust, on condition that a tramline be run to the ground. This is now the large recreational park, Kensington Wama, or Kensington Gardens Reserve, also referred to as Kensington Gardens, created around 1908–1909 and occupying 40 acres (16 ha).

In 1906 the Bank of New South Wales obtained section 271 from William Pile and subdivided it in 1910, with the suburb renamed to Kensington Gardens around 1910, after Kensington Gardens in London.

A tramline for electric trams, part of the network of Adelaide trams and on the first line of the network to be electrified in 1909, was built as an extension to the Kensington Line, which had previously terminated at the Parade/Gurrs Road intersection. The extension was built to serve the recently created reserve that the MTT had developed as a tourist attraction for extra ticket sales.

=== Lawn bowls and tennis club ===
On 19 February 1919, it was decided at a meeting of World War I veterans and volunteers to establish a lawn bowls club. The first AGM was held in September of that year, and the first clubhouse built by members and volunteers and the original building (still in existence) opened on 30 October 1920. In 1925 members decided to split into two sections, lawn tennis and bowling, for more effective management.

In June 1929, plans were prepared by architects F. Kenneth Milne, Evans and Russell to extend the clubhouse by around 1,200 ft^{2} (110 m^{2}), including an extension to the western end that would be used for serving afternoon tea, and new dressing rooms and showers. The club reopened in October that year.

In 1955, another plan for extending the building was prepared by the club treasurer, leading to a new locker room and visitors' room, and in 1976 further additions were constructed. In 1995 the bowls section merged with the Marryatville Bowling Club, and it became the Kensington Marryatville Bowling Club. In 2006 men's and women's bowling combined to create a single bowls section. As of 2024 the official name per website is Kensington Gardens Bowling & Tennis Club.

== Facilities ==
The Catholic Church in the suburb is dedicated to Saint Joseph.

== Kensington Gardens reserve ==
Stonyfell Creek runs through Kensington Gardens reserve. The south-eastern corner and part of South Terrace were once part of a Kaurna burial ground.

An annual sweet-pea exhibition was held in the reserve between 1910 and 1920, and in 1920, trees were felled in order to create the bowling green in the north-east corner. By 1923, part of the park had been laid out as a garden by a Mr A.H. Matthews of the Tramways Trust, and the name Kensington Gardens was used to refer to the suburb or the reserve.

A project to renovate, redevelop and revegetate the reserve, including creating a wetland to accommodate the stormwater drainage, was undertaken in 2021, with $3 million in funding from the federal government and A$850,000 from the South Australian Government, among other sponsors. The reserve was officially reopened in January 2022. It was undertaken with extensive consultation with Kaurna traditional owners, whose also approved the use of its new dual name, Wama (wah-ma), meaning plain, or flat country.

== Notable residents ==
- The artist and musician Gustave Barnes lived in Kensington Gardens before his death in 1921.
