= Electoral results for the district of Hartley (New South Wales) =

Election results for Hartley, New South Wales, Australia

Hartley, an electoral district of the Legislative Assembly in the Australian state of New South Wales had two incarnations, from 1859 until 1920 and from 1927 until 1968.

Election	Member	Party		
1859	Henry Rotton	None		
1860	Henry Rotton	None		
1864	John Lucas	None		
1869	James Neale	None		
1872	Thomas Brown	None		
1874	Thomas Brown	None		
1876 by	John Hurley	None		
1877	John Hurley	None		
1880	Robert Abbott	None		
1882	Walter Targett	None		
1885	Walter Targett	None		
1887	John Hurley	Free Trade		
1889	John Hurley	Free Trade		
1890 by	John Hurley	Free Trade	Member	Party
1891	Joseph Cook	Labour	George Donald	Free Trade
1894	Joseph Cook	Independent Labour		
1894 by	Joseph Cook	Free Trade		
1895	Joseph Cook	Free Trade		
1898	Joseph Cook	Free Trade		
1901	John Hurley	Independent		
1904	John Hurley	Liberal Reform		
1907	James Dooley	Labor		
1910	James Dooley	Labor		
1913	James Dooley	Labor		
1917	James Dooley	Labor		
Election	Member	Party		
1927	Hamilton Knight	Labor		
1930	Hamilton Knight	Labor		
1932	Hamilton Knight	Labor (NSW)		
1935	Hamilton Knight	Labor (NSW)		
1938	Hamilton Knight	Labor		
1941	Hamilton Knight	Labor		
1944	Hamilton Knight	Labor		
1947	Hamilton Knight	Labor		
1947 by	Jim Chalmers	Labor		
1950	Jim Chalmers	Labor		
1953	Jim Chalmers	Independent Labor		
1956	Jim Robson	Labor		
1959	Jim Robson	Labor		
1962	Jim Robson	Labor		
1965	Harold Coates	Independent		

== Election results ==
=== Elections in the 1960s ===
==== 1965 ====
1965 New South Wales state election: Hartley
Party	Candidate	Votes	%	±%
Labor	Jim Robson	8,228	47.4	−1.5
Independent	Harold Coates	7,984	46.0	−1.5
Democratic Labor	Laurence Breen	1,151	6.6	+6.6
Total formal votes		17,363	98.7	0.0
Informal votes		224	1.3	0.0
Turnout		17,587	95.8	−0.2
Two-candidate-preferred result
Independent	Harold Coates	8,933	51.4	+2.1
Labor	Jim Robson	8,430	48.6	−2.1
Independent gain from Labor		Swing	+2.1	

==== 1962 ====
1962 New South Wales state election: Hartley
Party	Candidate	Votes	%	±%
Labor	Jim Robson	8,778	48.9	−39.0
Independent	Harold Coates	8,530	47.5	+47.5
Communist	Peter Carroll	658	3.7	−8.4
Total formal votes		17,966	98.7	
Informal votes		227	1.3	
Turnout		18,193	96.0	
Two-candidate-preferred result
Labor	Jim Robson	9,100	50.7	−37.2
Independent	Harold Coates	8,866	49.3	+49.3
Labor hold		Swing	N/A	

=== Elections in the 1950s ===
==== 1959 ====
1959 New South Wales state election: Hartley
Party	Candidate	Votes	%	±%
Labor	Jim Robson	13,963	87.9	
Communist	Peter Carroll	1,931	12.1	
Total formal votes		15,894	92.0	
Informal votes		1,378	8.0	
Turnout		17,272	94.9	
Labor hold		Swing		

==== 1956 ====
1956 New South Wales state election: Hartley
Party	Candidate	Votes	%	±%
Labor	Jim Robson	7,595	44.7	+13.0
Independent Labor	William Black	7,539	44.3	−12.9
Communist	John King	825	4.9	−6.2
Independent	Neville Weekes	545	3.2	+3.2
Independent	Leslie Cant	498	2.9	+2.9
Total formal votes		17,002	96.0	−0.5
Informal votes		709	4.0	+0.5
Turnout		17,711	95.4	+0.3
Two-candidate-preferred result
Labor	Jim Robson	8,567	50.4	+14.0
Independent Labor	William Black	8,435	49.6	−14.0
Labor gain from Independent Labor		Swing	+14.0	

The sitting member for Hartley, Jim Chalmers (Independent Labor), unsuccessfully contested Nepean.

==== 1953 ====
1953 New South Wales state election: Hartley
Party	Candidate	Votes	%	±%
Independent Labor	Jim Chalmers	9,815	57.2	
Labor	James Punch	5,443	31.7	
Communist	John King	1,901	11.1	
Total formal votes		17,159	96.5	
Informal votes		625	3.5	
Turnout		17,784	95.1	
Two-candidate-preferred result
Independent Labor	Jim Chalmers	10,765	62.7	
Labor	James Punch	6,394	37.3	
Member changed to Independent Labor from Labor		Swing	N/A	

==== 1950 ====
1950 New South Wales state election: Hartley
Party	Candidate	Votes	%	±%
Labor	Jim Chalmers	9,187	67.1	
Liberal	James Cripps	3,371	24.6	
Communist	John King	1,142	8.3	
Total formal votes		13,700	98.7	
Informal votes		173	1.3	
Turnout		13,873	93.7	
Two-party-preferred result
Labor	Jim Chalmers		74.1 (Note: Two party preferred vote was estimated.)	
Liberal	James Cripps		25.9	
Labor hold		Swing		

=== Elections in the 1940s ===
==== 1947 by-election ====
1947 Hartley by-election Saturday 13 December
Party	Candidate	Votes	%	±%
Labor	Jim Chalmers	7,489	53.26	
Liberal	Harold Coates	5,071	36.07	
Industrial Labor	William Alexander	1,500	10.67	
Total formal votes		14,060	98.38	
Informal votes		231	1.62	
Turnout		14,291	88.10	
Labor hold		Swing	N/A	

Hamilton Knight (Labor) resigned to accept an appointment as a Commissioner in the Commonwealth Industrial Commission.

==== 1947 ====
1947 New South Wales state election: Hartley
Party	Candidate	Votes	%	±%
Labor	Hamilton Knight	12,551	84.7	−15.3
Communist	John King	2,263	15.3	+15.3
Total formal votes		14,814	94.9	
Informal votes		800	5.1	
Turnout		15,614	94.7	
Labor hold		Swing	N/A	

==== 1944 ====
1944 New South Wales state election: Hartley
Party	Candidate	Votes	%	±%
Labor	Hamilton Knight	unopposed		
Labor hold				

==== 1941 ====
1941 New South Wales state election: Hartley
Party	Candidate	Votes	%	±%
Labor	Hamilton Knight	11,437	83.3	
State Labor	James Starling	2,298	16.7	
Total formal votes		13,735	96.4	
Informal votes		512	3.6	
Turnout		14,247	94.6	
Labor hold		Swing		

=== Elections in the 1930s ===
==== 1938 ====
1938 New South Wales state election: Hartley
Party	Candidate	Votes	%	±%
Labor	Hamilton Knight	unopposed		
Labor hold				

==== 1935 ====
1935 New South Wales state election: Hartley
Party	Candidate	Votes	%	±%
Labor (NSW)	Hamilton Knight	8,772	88.2	+26.0
Communist	Robert Cram	1,169	11.8	+9.4
Total formal votes		9,941	89.5	−9.2
Informal votes		1,168	10.5	+9.2
Turnout		11,109	98.0	+0.6
Labor (NSW) hold		Swing	N/A	

==== 1932 ====
1932 New South Wales state election: Hartley
Party	Candidate	Votes	%	±%
Labor (NSW)	Hamilton Knight	7,080	62.2	−18.8
United Australia	Horace Bracey	2,440	21.4	+5.7
Independent Labor	James Dooley	1,585	13.9	+13.9
Communist	Patrick Walsh	275	2.4	−0.9
Total formal votes		11,380	98.7	+0.3
Informal votes		144	1.3	−0.3
Turnout		11,524	97.4	+2.1
Labor (NSW) hold		Swing	N/A	

- Preferences were not distributed.
- Horace Bracey was jointly endorsed by the UAP and Country party.

==== 1930 ====
1930 New South Wales state election: Hartley
Party	Candidate	Votes	%	±%
Labor	Hamilton Knight	9,797	81.0	
Nationalist	Alfred Samuels	1,904	15.7	
Communist	Alfred Airey	400	3.3	
Total formal votes		12,101	98.4	
Informal votes		201	1.6	
Turnout		12,302	95.3	
Labor hold		Swing		

=== Elections in the 1920s ===
==== 1927 ====
1927 New South Wales state election: Hartley
Party	Candidate	Votes	%	±%
Labor	Hamilton Knight	7,582	57.5	
Nationalist	Crawford Vaughan	5,603	42.5	
Total formal votes		13,185	99.2	
Informal votes		112	0.8	
Turnout		13,297	82.9	
Labor win		(new seat)		

==== 1920 - 1927 ====
District abolished

=== Elections in the 1910s ===
==== 1917 ====
1917 New South Wales state election: Hartley
Party	Candidate	Votes	%	±%
Labor	James Dooley	4,970	52.0	−3.3
Nationalist	James Ryan	4,582	48.0	+3.3
Total formal votes		9,552	98.7	+1.5
Informal votes		126	1.3	−1.5
Turnout		9,678	67.5	−3.9
Labor hold		Swing	−3.3	

==== 1913 ====
1913 New South Wales state election: Hartley
Party	Candidate	Votes	%	±%
Labor	James Dooley	4,643	55.3	
Liberal Reform	James Charlton	3,759	44.7	
Total formal votes		8,402	97.2	
Informal votes		241	2.8	
Turnout		8,643	71.4	
Labor hold				

==== 1910 ====
1910 New South Wales state election: Hartley
Party	Candidate	Votes	%	±%
Labour	James Dooley	5,646	65.7	
Liberal Reform	Sydney Innes-Noad	2,993	34.6	
Total formal votes		8,639	98.0	
Informal votes		177	2.0	
Turnout		8,816	67.9	
Labour hold				

=== Elections in the 1900s ===
==== 1907 ====
1907 New South Wales state election: Hartley
Party	Candidate	Votes	%	±%
Labour	James Dooley	2,967	50.2	
Liberal Reform	John Hurley	2,947	49.8	
Total formal votes		5,914	96.1	
Informal votes		241	3.9	
Turnout		6,155	59.9	
Labour gain from Liberal Reform				

==== 1904 ====
1904 New South Wales state election: Hartley
Party	Candidate	Votes	%	±%
Liberal Reform	John Hurley	2,498	58.0	
Labour	Robert Pillans	1,812	42.0	
Total formal votes		4,310	99.2	
Informal votes		36	0.8	
Turnout		0	0.0	
Member changed to Liberal Reform from Independent				

Hartley lost part of the district to Blayney and Wollondilly and was expanded with parts of The Macquarie, Northumberland, and the abolished seat of Rylstone. The member for Hartley was John Hurley (independent) who stood as a Liberal Reform candidate. The member for The Macquarie was his brother William Hurley (Progressive), who was appointed to the Legislative Council. The member for Rylstone was John Fitzpatrick who unsuccessfully contested Northumberland. The member for Northumberland was John Norton (Independent) who successfully contested Surry Hills.

==== 1901 ====
1901 New South Wales state election: Hartley
Party	Candidate	Votes	%	±%
Independent	John Hurley	518	32.9	
Labour	Robert Pillans	502	31.9	
Liberal Reform	Harry Goyder	472	30.0	−40.4
Independent	John Tabrett	41	2.6	
Progressive	Henry Brierley	40	2.5	−27.1
Total formal votes		1,573	99.6	+0.9
Informal votes		7	0.4	−0.9
Turnout		1,580	67.8	15.4
Independent gain from Liberal Reform				

The sitting member was Joseph Cook (Liberal Reform) who did not contest the election as he had been elected in March 1901 to the federal seat of Parramatta.

=== Elections in the 1890s ===
==== 1898 ====
1898 New South Wales colonial election: Hartley
Party	Candidate	Votes	%	±%
Free Trade	Joseph Cook	788	70.4	
National Federal	John Tabrett	332	29.6	
Total formal votes		1,120	98.7	
Informal votes		15	1.3	
Turnout		1,135	52.4	
Free Trade hold				

==== 1895 ====
1895 New South Wales colonial election: Hartley
Party	Candidate	Votes	%	±%
Free Trade	Joseph Cook	822	65.5	
Protectionist	William Sandford	412	32.8	
Independent	James Dickie	22	1.8	
Total formal votes		1,256	98.7	
Informal votes		16	1.3	
Turnout		1,272	63.9	
Free Trade hold				

==== 1894 by-election ====
1894 Hartley by-election Tuesday 14 August
Party	Candidate	Votes	%	±%
Free Trade	Joseph Cook (re-elected)	942	83.8	
Labour	James Thomson	182	16.2	
Total formal votes		1,124	99.5	
Informal votes		6	0.5	
Turnout		1,130	55.6 (Note: Estimate based on a roll of 2,031 at the 1894 election.)	
Member changed to Free Trade from Independent Labour				

Joseph Cook was appointed Postmaster General in the Reid ministry (Free Trade).

==== 1894 ====
1894 New South Wales colonial election: Hartley
Party	Candidate	Votes	%	±%
Independent Labour	Joseph Cook	723	47.0	
Ind. Free Trade	John Hurley	474	30.8	
Protectionist	William Richardson	194	12.6	
Ind. Free Trade	George Donald	130	8.5	
Labour	John Henry	17	1.1	
Total formal votes		1,538	98.6	
Informal votes		22	1.4	
Turnout		1,560	76.8	
Independent Labour win		(previously 2 members)		

==== 1891 ====
1891 New South Wales colonial election: Hartley Saturday 20 June
Party	Candidate	Votes	%	±%
Labour	Joseph Cook (elected 1)	1,049	31.5	
Free Trade	George Donald (elected 2)	699	21.0	
Free Trade	John Hurley	614	18.5	
Protectionist	Evan Jones	485	14.6	
Free Trade	Charles Passmore	231	6.9	
Free Trade	John Tabrett	153	4.6	
Independent	Thomas Richardson	97	2.9	
Total formal votes		3,328	99.3	
Informal votes		22	0.7	
Turnout		1,822	60.3	
Labour win 1		(1 new seat)		
Free Trade hold 1		(1 new seat)		

=== Elections in the 1880s ===
==== 1890 by-election ====
1890 Hartley by-election Saturday 26 July
Party	Candidate	Votes	%	±%
Free Trade	John Hurley (re-elected)	903	59.8	
Protectionist	John Norton	608	40.2	
Total formal votes		1,511	98.6	
Informal votes		22	1.4	
Turnout		1,533	54.2	
Free Trade hold				

John Hurley (Free Trade) resigned due to bankruptcy.

==== 1889 ====
1889 New South Wales colonial election: Hartley Saturday 9 February
Party	Candidate	Votes	%	±%
Free Trade	John Hurley (elected)	707	48.9	
Protectionist	J P T Caulfield	537	37.1	
Protectionist	Richard Inch	203	14.0	
Total formal votes		1,447	98.0	
Informal votes		29	2.0	
Turnout		1,476	61.5	
Free Trade hold				

==== 1887 ====
1887 New South Wales colonial election: Hartley Saturday 12 February
Party	Candidate	Votes	%	±%
Free Trade	John Hurley (elected)	619	44.8	
Ind. Protectionist	Richard Inch	333	24.1	
Protectionist	John Young	245	17.7	
Protectionist	Brisbane Doyle	184	13.3	
Total formal votes		1,381	97.9	
Informal votes		30	2.1	
Turnout		1,411	64.1	

The sitting member Walter Targett unsuccessfully contested The Hastings and Manning.

==== 1885 ====
1885 New South Wales colonial election: Hartley Friday 16 October
Candidate	Votes	%
Walter Targett (re-elected)	591	52.5
Brisbane Doyle	535	47.5
Total formal votes	1,126	98.1
Informal votes	22	1.9
Turnout	1,148	57.3

==== 1882 ====
1882 New South Wales colonial election: Hartley Thursday 14 December
Candidate	Votes	%
Walter Targett (elected)	298	28.4
Charles Passmore	293	28.0
John Shepherd	195	18.6
George Lloyd	174	16.6
John Hughes	88	8.4
Total formal votes	1,048	97.7
Informal votes	25	2.3
Turnout	1,087	54.0

==== 1880 ====
1880 New South Wales colonial election: Hartley Friday 26 November
Candidate	Votes	%
Robert Abbott (elected)	396	44.0
John Hurley (defeated)	361	40.1
Walter Targett	143	15.9
Total formal votes	900	96.6
Informal votes	32	3.4
Turnout	932	55.6

=== Elections in the 1870s ===
==== 1877 ====
1877 New South Wales colonial election: Hartley Thursday 1 November
Candidate	Votes	%
John Hurley (re-elected)	695	57.8
Patrick Higgins	508	42.2
Total formal votes	1,203	97.8
Informal votes	27	2.2
Turnout	1,230	63.0

==== 1876 by-election ====
1876 Hartley by-election Friday 21 April
Candidate	Votes	%
John Hurley (elected)	339	52.1
James Neale	722	45.2
Total formal votes	651	100.0
Informal votes	0	0.0
Turnout	651	37.4

The Committee of Elections and Qualifications found that Thomas Brown had an office of profit under the crown and declared that his seat was vacant.

==== 1874 ====
1874–75 New South Wales colonial election: Hartley Monday 21 December 1874
Candidate	Votes	%
Thomas Brown (re-elected)	unopposed	

==== 1872 ====
1872 New South Wales colonial election: Hartley Wednesday 6 March
Candidate	Votes	%
Thomas Brown (elected)	434	47.8
Morris Asher	225	24.8
James Byrnes	187	20.6
John Garsed	47	5.2
E N Emmett	10	1.1
Joseph Johnson	4	0.4
John Ardill	1	0.1
Total formal votes	908	100.0
Informal votes	0	0.0
Turnout	933	45.0

=== Elections in the 1860s ===
==== 1869 ====
1869–70 New South Wales colonial election: Hartley Thursday 23 December 1869
Candidate	Votes	%
James Neale (elected)	628	77.2
Andrew Brown	179	22.0
John Garsed	7	0.9
Total formal votes	814	100.0
Informal votes	0	0.0
Turnout	814	38.8

==== 1864 ====
1864–65 New South Wales colonial election: Hartley Thursday 8 December 1864
Candidate	Votes	%
John Lucas (elected)	231	55.5
Andrew Brown	185	44.5
Total formal votes	416	100.0
Informal votes	0	0.0
Turnout	416	37.4

==== 1860 ====
1860 New South Wales colonial election: Hartley Friday 14 December
Candidate	Votes	%
Henry Rotton (elected)	190	54.1
William Russell	161	45.9
Total formal votes	351	100.0
Informal votes	0	0.0
Turnout	351	35.5

=== Elections in the 1850s ===
==== 1859 ====
1859 New South Wales colonial election: Hartley Saturday 25 June
Candidate	Votes	%
Henry Rotton (elected)	281	57.8
Ryan Brenan	205	42.2
Total formal votes	486	100.0
Informal votes	0	0.0
Turnout	486	59.5
