= 1947 Hartley state by-election =

Election result for Hartley, New South Wales, Australia

A by-election was held for the New South Wales Legislative Assembly electorate of Hartley on 13 December 1947 because of the resignation of Hamilton Knight (Labor) to accept an appointment as a Commissioner in the Commonwealth Industrial Commission.

== Dates ==
Date	Event
29 October 1947	Hamilton Knight resigned.
14 November 1947	Writ of election issued by the Speaker of the Legislative Assembly.
28 November 1947	Nominations
13 December 1947	Polling day
2 January 1948	Return of writ

== Result ==
1947 Hartley by-election Saturday 13 December
Party	Candidate	Votes	%	±%
Labor	Jim Chalmers	7,489	53.26	
Liberal	Harold Coates	5,071	36.07	
Industrial Labor	William Alexander	1,500	10.67	
Total formal votes		14,060	98.38	
Informal votes		231	1.62	
Turnout		14,291	88.10	
Labor hold		Swing	N/A	

== See also ==
- Electoral results for the district of Hartley
- List of New South Wales state by-elections
