= 1876 Hartley colonial by-election =

By-election in New South Wales, Australia

A by-election was held for the New South Wales Legislative Assembly electorate of Hartley on 21 April 1876 because the Committee of Elections and Qualifications found that Thomas Brown had an office of profit under the crown and declared that his seat was vacant.

== Dates ==
Date	Event
24 February 1876	Question referred to the Committee of Elections and Qualifications.
22 March 1876	The Committee of Elections and Qualifications reported that Thomas Brown was disqualified from sitting.
28 March 1876	Seat declared vacant.
29 March 1876	Writ of election issued by the Speaker of the Legislative Assembly.
13 April 1876	Nominations
21 April 1876	Polling day
30 June 1876	Return of writ

== Committee of Elections and Qualifications ==
Thomas Brown owned land at Eskbank at what is now Lithgow, some of which was acquired using Robert Pitt as a dummy or proxy, circumventing the Lands Act 1861. Coal was mined at the property and William Pitt was the colliery manager. In October 1875 Thomas Brown responded to a tender for the supply of coal to the railway, however no contract was awarded. In December 1875 a fresh tender was called and William Pitt personally submitted a tender which was accepted. Samuel Gray said in the Legislative Assembly that Thomas Brown leased the colliery to William Pitt and that the only connection between them was one of landlord and tenant.

The Committee found that Thomas Brown was the owner of the Eskbank Colliery, the coal supplied by William Pitt was taken from the Eskbank Colliery and that Thomas Brown had a "direct interest in a contract entered into with the Government by the said William Pitt for the supply of engine coal for the Great Southern and Western Railways" and was therefore disqualified from being a member of the Legislative Assembly.

After the Committee report was tabled Thomas Brown attempted to resign, however the Legislative Assembly adopted the report of the committee and declared the seat was vacant.

The question of whether Hugh Taylor had an interest in a contract for the supply of meat to the government asylum at Parramatta was referred to the committee on the same day as Thomas Brown. Taylor resigned after the report on Thomas Brown had been tabled, but before the committee had reported on whether he too was disqualified, and the resulting by-election was held on Thursday 20 April.

== Result ==
1876 Hartley by-election Friday 21 April
Candidate	Votes	%
John Hurley (elected)	339	52.1
James Neale	722	45.2
Total formal votes	651	100.0
Informal votes	0	0.0
Turnout	651	37.4

== See also ==
- Electoral results for the district of Hartley
- List of New South Wales state by-elections
