= Ida Wedel-Jarlsberg =

Norwegian painter (1855–1929)

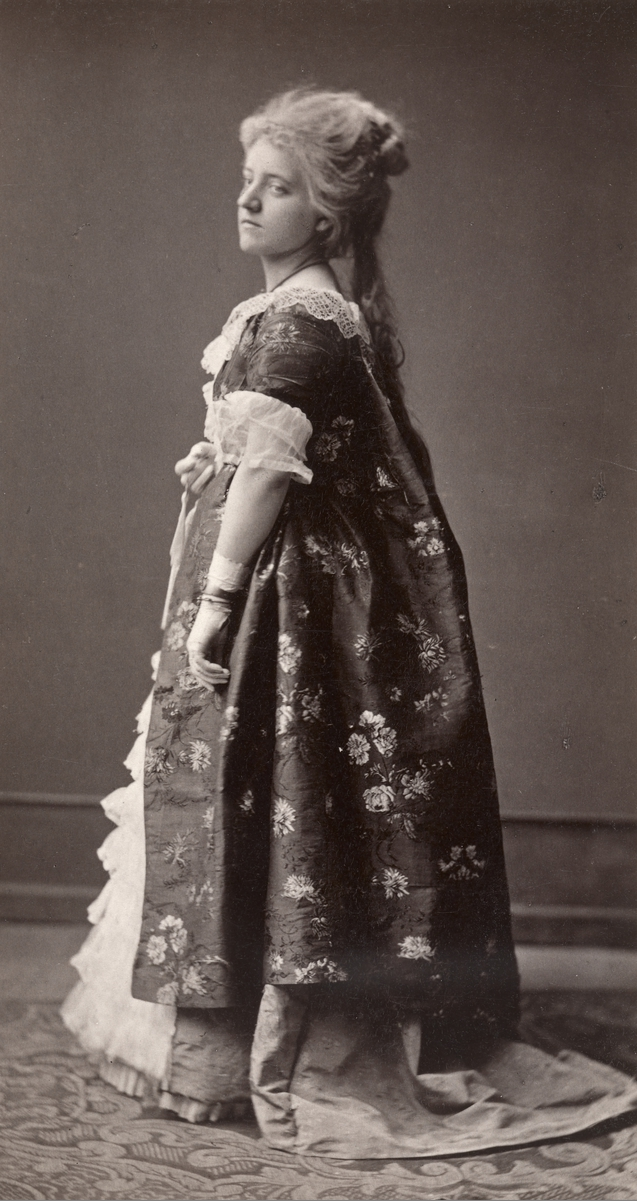
Countess Ida von Wedel-Jarlsberg in 1877

Ida Charlotte Clementine von Wedel-Jarlsberg (12 September 1855 – 29 January 1929) was a Norwegian courtier, artist, temperance activist, pacifist and feminist. She was a lady-in-waiting (hovfröken) of Queen Sophia of Sweden.

== Biography ==
She was the daughter of the Norwegian nobleman and landowner Count Peder Anker von Wedel-Jarlsberg (1809–1893) and his wife, Hedevig Annette Betzy Sigismunda Anker (1819–1879). She attended the painting school of Knud Bergslien (1873–74) in Kristiania. Afterwards she continued her studies at Karlsruhe with Hans Gude as an instructor. From 1875 to 1877 she stayed in Munich, where she had the painter Eilif Peterssen as her tutor.

She was appointed as maid of honour to queen Sophia of Sweden-Norway in 1878. She is noted to have been a favorite of the queen among the ladies-in-waiting, along with Märta Eketrä and Ebba von Rosen. She lost her position as lady-in-waiting in 1885, because she refused to attend a dinner with prime minister Johan Sverdrup as the representative of the queen, her reason being that she disliked the prime minister on political grounds.

In 1892, she was elected chairman of the temperance- and pacifist society Norske Kvinders Totalavholdsselskap – Det Hvite Bånd. In 1894, she founded the women's association Unge Kvinners Kristelige Samfund with Birgitte Esmark (1841-1897).

By 1910, Ida shared a house with several other socially conscious women including Valentine Dannevig and Solveig Lund.

She visited Italy several times as a painter and lived there permanently from 1916 to 1923. She died during 1929 in Oslo.
