= 1890 Hartley colonial by-election =

By-election in New South Wales, Australia

A by-election was held for the New South Wales Legislative Assembly electorate of Hartley on 26 July 1890 because John Hurley (Free Trade) resigned due to bankruptcy.

== Dates ==
Date	Event
3 July 1890	John Hurley resigned.
4 July 1890	John Hurley made bankrupt.
4 July 1890	Writ of election issued by the Speaker of the Legislative Assembly.
22 July 1890	Nominations
26 July 1890	Polling day
5 August 1890	Return of writ

== Result ==
1890 Hartley by-election Saturday 26 July
Party	Candidate	Votes	%	±%
Free Trade	John Hurley (re-elected)	903	59.8	
Protectionist	John Norton	608	40.2	
Total formal votes		1,511	98.6	
Informal votes		22	1.4	
Turnout		1,533	54.2	
Free Trade hold				

== See also ==
- Electoral results for the district of Hartley
- List of New South Wales state by-elections
