= Eskbank House =

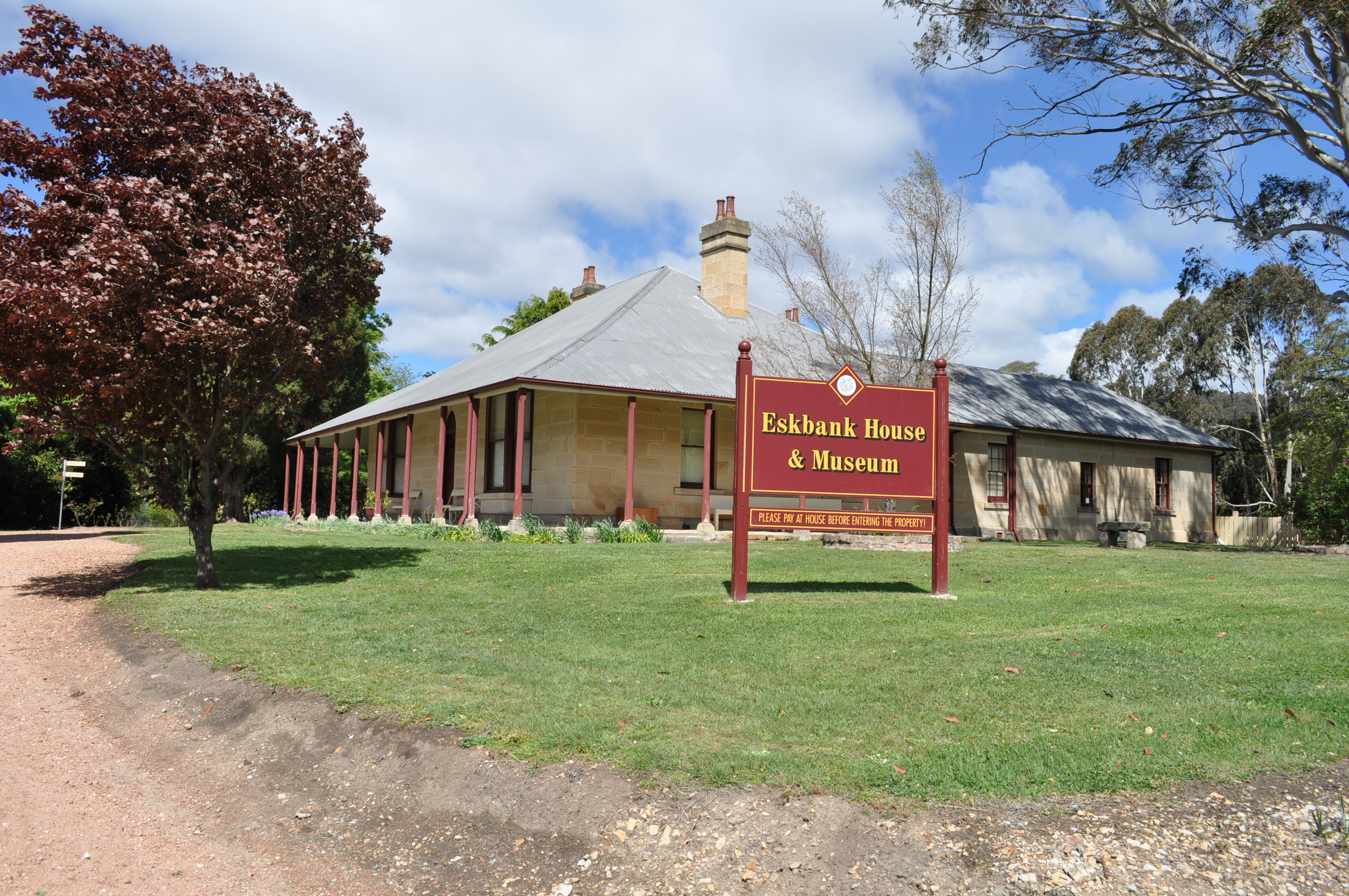
- Eskbank House and museum, in 2010

- Location within New South Wales Location within Australia
- 33.4790°S 150.1638°E
- Location: 70 Inch Street, Lithgow, City of Lithgow, New South Wales, Australia

History
- Built: 1841–1842

Site notes
- Owner: Lithgow City Council

New South Wales Heritage Register
- Official name: Eskbank House and Moveable Collections; Esk Bank House; The Grange
- Type: State heritage (built)
- Designated: 24 August 2018
- Reference no.: 2008
- Type: Homestead building
- Category: Residential buildings (private)
- Builders: Alexander Binning, using convict labour

Eskbank House is a heritage-listed former mine owner's residence, iron and steel works manager's residence, school and boarding house and now museum, event venue and community resource centre at 70 Inch Street, Lithgow, City of Lithgow, New South Wales, Australia. It was designed by an unknown architect and built from 1841 to 1842 by Alexander Binning, a stonemason, using convict labour. It is also known as Eskbank House and Moveable Collections and Esk Bank House; The Grange. The property is owned by Lithgow City Council. The residence was added to the New South Wales State Heritage Register on 24 August 2018.

== History ==
=== Aboriginal custodianship ===
While the Lithgow area lies within the traditional lands of the Wiradjuri people, it appears that the valley itself was predominantly inhabited by the Wywandy (or Wallerawang) clan of the Gundungurra people. European incursion after 1814 exerted substantial pressures on local Aboriginal people, who strove to maintain their way of life amidst the progressive dispossession of their lands.

=== Beginnings of European settlement ===
The Lithgow Valley was so named in 1827 by explorer Hamilton Hume in honour of William Lithgow, secretary to Governor Brisbane. The value of the Lithgow Valley was greatly accentuated by the presence of easily accessible coal, although in the absence of suitable transport links this resource could not be fully exploited. Still, it was suitable for local use, which was increased by the opening in 1837 of a substantial flour mill on Scottish-born Andrew Brown's Cooerwull Estate.

==== Thomas Brown of Esk Bank ====
It was to the Cooerwull Estate that another Scotsman, Thomas Brown, journeyed in the late 1830s. Brown, a native of Craigend, near Inverness, arrived in Sydney with his wife, Mary (née Maxwell) and several of her relatives. Two months later he took a two-year lease over the Cooerwull Mill. While Andrew Brown and Thomas Brown were not related, Mary Brown was related to John Maxwell of "Liddleton", via Hartley. Thomas is said to have supervised the construction of the initial element of the Cooerwull homestead, which became known as Cooerwull House. Brown, Mary, and some of Mary's relatives are thought to have lived during this time in a small cottage on the estate. Thomas clearly understood the potential of the area, and in 1840 purchased 210 acres (85 hectares) adjoining Cooerwull. Over the next few years he added considerably to his holdings, circumventing the Lands Act 1861 (NSW). This he did through the use of a "dummy", or proxy, a local carpenter named Robert Pitt. Brown named his lands the "Esk Bank Estate" after a village on the River Esk, near his birthplace.

In 1841–1842, just east of what is now the Lithgow city centre, Brown built a well-capitalised homestead complex named Esk Bank House. Situated on a low rise, it consisted of an elegant single-storey sandstone ashlar-coursed dwelling and outbuildings. Its construction appears to have been supervised by Alexander Binning, a Scottish stonemason. The stone for Esk Bank House appears to have been quarried at Burton's Quarry, located on the eastern ridge of the Lithgow Valley. Construction was assisted by convict labour. The homestead's water supply was by agency of a subterranean tank fed by roof water. The grounds of Esk Bank House were, at this time, characterised by a sweeping, wide, circular gravelled carriageway, linked to the front and side verandahs by paths between ornamental garden beds. Fencing constrained the domestic livestock and protected extensive vegetable gardens, as well as ornamental garden beds, from intrusion. Plantings were characterised by English deciduous trees, as well as by evergreens such as conifers.

Brown's early prosperity is illustrated by his appointment in 1852 as a Bench Magistrate; three years later he became a Police Magistrate. Brown and Mary did not have children, although from 1864 until 1871 they cared for their ward, Isabella Lunn, whose parents had purchased "Liddleton" from John Maxwell. Brown found diversion as an amateur geologist and naturalist. It may have been to house his "fine museum" that Brown constructed at Esk Bank a stone outbuilding now known as the Garden House, a visually surprising building which, with its pinnacles, may owe something to Scottish ecclesiastical architecture. Brown is known to have donated gems and fossils to the Australian Museum. These, stored in the Museum's space within the Garden Palace, Sydney, were lost when in 1882 that building was destroyed by fire. In 1872 Brown resigned from the bench. The next year he was elected to the Parliament of New South Wales.

==== The coming of the railway ====
In 1869 the Great Western Railway opened as far as Bowenfels. Brown's Esk Bank Colliery greatly increased production after the installation of a railway siding named after Brown himself. Here, in 1874, a passenger platform, the genesis of Eskbank Railway Station, was constructed. The coming of the railway was a spur to local development. In late 1874, again using Robert Pitt as a "dummy", Brown won a tender for the supply of government locomotive coal. Yet success turned to disappointment when, in February 1876, the propriety of the tender was questioned in Parliament. This ultimately resulted in Brown's disqualification as an MP; yet his business interests continued to burgeon.

==== Industrial and urban development ====
Brown's attitude to alienation of land was very conservative; but leasing of land allowed the development of local industries, including the pottery and brickworks of the Lithgow Valley Pottery Company; two other brickworks; two copper smelters; the refrigeration works of the NSW Fresh Food & Ice Co. Ltd; and, yet more ambitious, the iron works of the Lithgow Valley Iron Company Ltd. To all of these he supplied coal on an expensive monopoly basis. Brown also leased land for residential and commercial purposes. His sale to William Gray of six acres led to the foundation of a new township which came to be identified as Lithgow proper. Eskbank and Lithgow became rivals, with Brown donating the sites of the local Church of England, Eskbank Railway Station and the first and second Lithgow public schools. He also endowed the Lithgow School of Arts and St. Mary's Presbyterian Church.

===== Ironmaking: inception at Lithgow =====
Perhaps the most remarkable of the industrial undertakings on the Esk Bank Estate was that of the Lithgow Valley Iron Company Ltd, trading as the Esk Bank Iron Company. The six subscribing partners included Scots-born John Sutherland, Henry Parkes' Secretary for Public Works; Thomas Denny; Daniel Williams, an English-born railway contractor; James Rutherford, American-born and a principal of Cobb & Co.; James Phillips; and Robert Kelly. These were advised by the enigmatic Enoch Hughes, an English-born ironsmith who had erected the blast furnace of the Fitz Roy iron works near Mittagong. Shares were taken by William Whitney, and also by Thomas Brown himself. In 1875 the company began to construct a blast furnace and ancillary plant. The blast furnace was in many respects similar to that of the earlier Fitz Roy iron works near Mittagong; but it was small, and of an outdated pattern. The first pig iron was successfully run out in late 1875, yet profitability proved elusive. In an attempt to overcome Lithgow's isolation from the seaboard that Sutherland used his Parliamentary position to secure freight rates favourable to the enterprise. Yet it was Daniel Williams who 'laid the foundations for Australia's modern iron and steel industry', and maintained his efforts until stress and illness forced his departure for England, where he was to die an untimely death.

===== The Lithgow Valley Pottery =====
The growth of Lithgow brick and pottery manufactures in some ways paralleled that of the local iron industry. It was realised that brick and pottery manufacture was the best way to use otherwise worthless slack coal and waste clay generated by the Lithgow Valley Colliery. To this end the Lithgow Valley Pottery was established. In 1878 the works, located directly opposite the colliery, commenced production of pipes and pavers. During the following year, brickmaker James Silcock, a skilled Derbyshire potter, demonstrated pottery techniques to his employers, encouraging them to venture into pottery manufacture. Silcock later departed for Fieldsend's pottery at East Maitland and later still purchased a pottery near Newcastle. A wide variety of wares, extending from cups and saucers to spittoons, was produced in the Lithgow bottle kilns, although the pottery served a working- and middle-class market and produced only a few limited-edition pieces. Competition from imports gradually affected profitability, leading to the closure of the pottery in 1896, although brick and pipe production continued into the 1940s. In 1905 industrialist Arthur Brownfield reopened the facility as the Australasian Brownfield's Pottery Ltd; yet this failed two years later. The fate of the pottery could only reinforce Lithgow's dependence on coal mining and iron making.

===== Ironmaking: the Rutherford era =====
James Rutherford, who by this time had become the leading director of the iron company, continued to believe in the potential of the iron works. So it was that, in 1881, he offered to purchase the Esk Bank Estate, as well as Brown's shares, using Cobb & Co. capital. In the event, Rutherford had to raise the 45,000 pounds himself. By now a widower, Brown abandoned his home of four decades and moved to St. Leonards, where he was to die in 1889. Rutherford leased Eskbank House, which became known as "The Grange", to a local businessman Robert Crawford, who lived there with his wife Rosina. The house appears, also, to have been leased by a Mrs Cabot, under whom the property became a girls' finishing school. During this period, the grounds of the house were little changed, but much of the valley floor in the vicinity of the house was cleared.

Identifying a need for workers' housing, Rutherford proceeded to subdivide part of the Esk Bank Estate; but sales were disappointing. He then tried to increase the profitability of the ironworks by means of a workers' cooperative. Rutherford, however, soon fell into despair, and had the blast furnace demolished. The works continued to re-roll iron rails, yet the increasing government preference for steel rails made this activity unviable. In 1886 Rutherford accepted the offer of English- born William Sandford, a former lessee of the Fitz Roy rolling mills, to lease the plant.

===== Ironmaking: the Sandford era =====
William Sandford, a former employee of John Lysaght Ltd of Bristol, was fortunate that the colonial investment boom of the 1880s increased the demand for iron. In 1890 he offered to purchase the Eskbank Estate, as the property was now generally described. The offer included the iron works, two collieries, and The Grange. Settlement occurred in October 1892. Sandford established a combined plate and sheet mill for the production of corrugated iron. This was the first in Australia to sheet, corrugate and galvanise in the one location. The consequent upsurge in employment, together with a social conscience, encouraged Sandford to prepare plans for a model township of the Eskbank Estate, and to assist his workers to build cottages to his own designs. It has been suggested that Lithgow was 'for most of its life a worktown and a man's town, where women and children had literally no place'. If this is so, Sandford's social attitudes were atypical. Encouraged by the success of his ironworks, Sandford decided to venture into steelmaking, an activity until then restricted to some by-then closed works in Victoria. In 1898 he selected as the basis of his venture two 4.5 ton-capacity Siemens-Martin New Form open hearth furnaces.

===== Steelmaking: beginnings and development =====
By April 1900 the first open hearth furnace had been installed, although the first steel was not produced until later that month. In addressing a celebratory banquet, Joseph Cook MLA, an erstwhile Lithgow coal miner and a future Prime Minister of Australia, ascribed Sandford's success not to protection from imports but to his "industry, energy, and business capacity". It was fitting that Sandford's successful production of the metal considered the very basis of naval and military might should have occurred on the eve of Federation, itself a movement largely induced by anxieties as to the protection of Australian and Imperial geopolitical interests.

The Grange was successfully leased to a succession of specialists in close contact with local industry: a Mr Blakemore, of the Great Cobar mining and smelting syndicate; a Mr Holdship, of the Lithgow Supply Company; and a Mr Blackwell, Manager of the Vale of Clwydd Colliery. During this period the grounds were characterised by a now-mature garden; mature conifers; and what may have been Monterey pine (Pinus radiata).

Sandford went on to form the firm of William Sandford Ltd. His notebooks record his secret payment of money by which to win a NSW government tender for the supply of steel. Payments are ascribed to three MPs, including William Holman, the deputy leader of the Opposition. On the strength of these, Sandford constructed a new blast furnace, which was blown in on 13 May 1907. The plant dominated the town of Lithgow, but Sandford had overreached his resources. He increased his overdraft, but had to sell his remaining Eskbank Estate holdings to William Sandford Ltd. When the bank foreclosed, the shutting down of the works threw 700 hands into unemployment. The assets, including The Grange, were purchased by Sydney industrialists George and Charles Hoskins. Sandford retired to Sydney's Darling Point an embittered man, but one to whom his erstwhile employees and their families remained grateful.

===== Steelmaking: the Hoskins era =====
Charles Hoskins, the dominant figure of G. & C. Hoskins Ltd, installed new plant and augmented the existing blast furnace. In August 1911 a series of industrial disputes culminated in the storming of the works by its employees. Hoskins, his sons and some strike-breakers were confined in an office, guarded by some very nervous police with drawn revolvers. By 1911 market prospects had improved, not least due to the commencement of work on the Australian Government's Small Arms Factory, in the establishment of which Sir Joseph Cook was instrumental. It was against this background that Hoskins constructed a No. 2 Blast Furnace, which was blown-in in November 1913. With the opening in 1914 of a railway connecting the iron works and the steelmaking department, Hoskins had at last succeeded in creating an integrated iron and steel plant.

During this period, The Grange was given over to senior employees. Chief among these was William Mortlock, who, with his 1916 appointment as manager of the blast furnace department, moved into the house with his family. When in 1920 Charles Hoskins formed Hoskins Iron and Steel Ltd, Mortlock was not only made a director of the firm, but was appointed Executive Officer in charge of the Lithgow works. During this period, the formal front entry to the house was rarely used, with family and guest coming and going via the rear door, the paddock north of the house having become the Lithgow sportsground and showground. Much of the surrounding area was denuded of significant vegetation, while a large spoil heap stood to the north-east of the house. The Mortlocks found the house cold and impracticable, to ameliorate which William infilled the courtyard and constructed a gable-roofed addition providing an area more easily kept warm during the Lithgow winter. The Grange was the centre of a lively family and social life, including "smokos" and concerts, for which the former courtyard was most suitable.

During the Great War, Charles Hoskins had realised that he could not successfully compete with BHP's Newcastle works, opened in 1915. He therefore devised a plan to construct a new iron and steel works at Port Kembla, after which the Lithgow works would be closed. This plan was implemented not by Charles, who died in 1926, but by his sons, Cecil Hoskins and Arthur Sidney (Sid') Hoskins, who in 1928 joined with UK and Australian interests to establish Australian Iron and Steel Ltd (A.I.S.). Charles Hoskins's life at Lithgow is commemorated not only by the Hoskins Memorial Church, endowed in memory of children who had predeceased him, but also in the Lithgow Literary Institute. During this time, The Grange did not site idle, although in 1926 Mortlock was transferred to Hoskins' Wattle Street, Sydney, works. The house was thereafter occupied by his brother, Valentine (Val) and Val's wife, Norma, who had two children. The house was later home to various managers of A.I.S. Lithgow collieries, which despite the cessation of all activities at the Lithgow works in December 1931 remained in production. The closure of the Lithgow iron and steel works caused lasting bitterness in a city which had hoped to become an Antipodean Birmingham or Pittsburgh.

==== Eskbank House: WWII era ====
The wartime need for steaming coal, together with the emergency expansion of the Lithgow Small Arms Factory, greatly increased Lithgow's need for workers and stimulated a local housing boom. During this period, The Grange was leased by the Paterson family, who operated it as a boarding house. Most of the boarders, cared for by a cook-cum-housekeeper, worked at the Small Arms Factory.

==== Eskbank House: the post-War era ====
After the Second World War, Eric Bracey, a local businessman and member of the Lithgow District Historical Society, provided the capital to purchase The Grange and transfer it to Lithgow Council. Led by Bracey, who was inspired by Vaucluse House, the Society undertook to restore the property in the 'taste of the late 1800s', including the purchase of furnishings. From 1949 to 1969 the house was tenanted by Mick and Helen Blagojevich. The former, from Yugoslavia, had during WWII been a prisoner of war, while the latter, from Poland, had been a concentration camp inmate. During this time, sheep and goats ranged freely across the grounds. Bracey replanted the grounds in a 1950s parkland style, using mainly North American conifers and deciduous trees. Garden beds were made and tended by a tenant caretaker. Roses were extensively planted along the verandahs and the so-called Rose Walk, a long bed leading away from the eastern side of the house. The Historical Society went on thoroughly to renovate the house and outbuildings, undertaking repairs but unnecessarily stripping some historic layers. In 1966 the sportsfield-cum-showground to the north was subdivided for light industrial development.

==== Eskbank House: the house museum era ====
In 1966 the Society opened Eskbank House, as it was again called, as a house museum. In 1969 a new pedestrian and vehicular entry was provided off Bennett Street. In the same year, "Possum", an A.I.S. saddle tank locomotive that had served at both the Lithgow and Port Kembla iron and steel works, was installed in the grounds. It was joined by a Buffalo Pitts traction engine from Neubeck's colliery and sawmills, and by a Lithgow City Council steam road roller. In the 1970s, and in accordance with the Bush Garden philosophy popular at the time, a Grevillea hedge, which has since been removed, was established to the front of the house, while Eucalypts were planted along the Inch Street frontage.

==== Eskbank House: the current era ====
The dwelling and outbuildings, supported by some newer structures, have over the past few decades become the repository of several collections of historical relics and memorabilia. The garden, too, has continued to evolve. With the winding-up of the Lithgow District Historical Society, care of the property has reverted to Lithgow City Council. While Eskbank House remains a house museum and display centre for historic collections, it is also in regular use for community functions; music, craft; dance and art events; and school holiday programs.

== Description ==
=== Setting and landscape ===
Eskbank House, situated north east of the Lithgow CBD, is located on a low rise overlooking portions of the Lithgow Valley. Views to and from the house will at first have taken in much of the Eskbank Estate, originally the property of Thomas Brown, the founder of Eskbank House. Many sight lines to and from the house remain extant, although some vistas to the north are slightly disrupted by plantings screening the light industrial estate to the north. They are obscured, also, by conifers addressing the boundary with Inch Street to the south. The eastern boundary adjoins a private home and a former milk delivery facility. The western boundary is characterised by ornamental plantings, giving way to regularly-spaced poplars on the Bennett Street footpath reflecting matching planting on the opposite side of the road, adjacent to the Lithgow harness racing, greyhound and football facility. The main vehicular entry is from Bennett Street.

The house is set within grounds approximately one hectare in area. These are characterised by widely spaced trees, with more formal plantings on the street frontages. The ornamental gardens are considerably larger than they were in the nineteenth century. Plantings include Japanese Maple (Acer japonica); Box elder (Acer negundo); Crab Apple (Malus sylvestris); Ash (Fraxinus sp.); Lombardy Poplar (Populus nigra); Flowering Prunus (Prunus sp.); Pin Oak, (Quercus palustris); False Acacia (Robinia sp.); Lilac (Syringa sp.); Elm (Ulums sp.); Wattles (Acacia sp.); Conifers; Eucalyptus sp.; Holly (Ilex sp.); Cherry Laurel (Prunus laurocerus); Chinese Elm (Ulnus parrifolia); Cotoneaster sp.; Lauristinus (Vibrunum tinus); and Eucalyptus. The original layout of the garden remains partially extant. Paths are narrower than at the time of their establishment.

=== Eskbank House ===
Eskbank House is a single-storey Victorian Georgian-style residence constructed in 1841–1842. Built of ashlar-coursed sandstone quarried nearby, the building is symmetrical in plan, and features a slightly bellcast roof covered in galvanised iron in short, galvanised sheets. Joinery is of cedar. The rear wings are hipped-roofed, similarly covered. Three sides of the house are surrounded by a stone-flagged verandah. The northern elevation is characterised by matching bay windows which may or may not be original elements. The central hallway is entered via an arched main entry providing access to four flanking rooms, and subsequently to the rear wings. The dwelling contains a house museum, together with collections of items associated with the social and economic history of Lithgow. The former rear courtyard, now infilled, is used for art exhibitions.

=== Stables and Coach House ===
This structure is located east of the main dwelling, with which it is considered contemporaneous. Executed in ashlar-coursed sandstone and of simple design, the structure is galvanised iron-roofed and features an attic served by external, stone-built steps, the appearance of which suggests that they post-date the remainder of the structure. Stored within is a horse coach and a variety of domestic and trade tools.

=== Worker's House ===
Associated with the stables and coach house, and post-dating it, is a single-roomed structure, executed in ashlar-coursed sandstone and known as the 'Worker's House'. Its roof, of galvanised iron, is differently-pitched and lower than that of the stables and coach house.

=== Blacksmith's Courtyard ===
This space, L-shaped in plan, is produced by the intersection of three structures: the stables and coach house; a skillion-roofed element open on two sides; and a hipped-roofed structure. Roofed in galvanised iron, it accommodated the Eskbank Estate smithy, the functions of which are demonstrated by blacksmith's tools and the like. The entry is partly enclosed by projecting walls. Stored within are a Lithgow Co-operative Society delivery cart and blacksmiths' tools.

=== Garden House ===
This small but remarkable structure, thought to have been constructed in the 1860s, might best be described as a folly. It appears to have been built as a small museum, housing Thomas Brown's collection of geological, natural history, ethnographic and historic items. Roofed in galvanised iron and situated between the main house and the stables, the building is hexagonal in plan and is executed in ashlar-laid sandstone with margined and rusticated quoins and similarly detailed single square-faced stones. It also features corner pinnacles strongly reminiscent of historic Scots ecclesiastical practice. The structure has lost its original stripe-painted iron roof, ball terminations to the pinnacles, and weathervane depicting a ship. Its entry is protected by a recently constructed, galvanised iron-roofed gabled timber portico with decorative bargeboards and a timber roof finial.

=== Toilet block ===
This contemporary building, executed in concrete blocks, and located near the north-eastern edge of the property, was built in 1969-1970 to provide for the needs of visitors.

Three collections currently associated with Eskbank House may be of state heritage significance. These are the Lithgow Iron Works and Blast Furnace Collection; the Lithgow Pottery Collection; and the Sir Joseph Cook Collection. These have not been assessed, but may be of local heritage significance.

=== Lithgow Iron Works and Blast Furnace Collection ===
Housed within the main dwelling, this consists of items associated with the former Lithgow iron and steel works. It includes a reference supplied by Australian Iron and Steel to Mr Thomas Chalmers, its last Lithgow iron and steel works employee (employed between 1926 and 1932); a marble bust of William Sandford; a rectangular iron test piece; a triangular steel test piece; iron test pieces in the shape of a fish and a walking horse; an original photograph of Hoskins Lithgow Iron and Steel Works staff in 1909; two gentlemen's silver-backed grooming brushes presented by Charles Hoskins to his son Henry, who was later killed in an accident at the works; "Possum", a steam shunting locomotive; and the three so-called Lithgow Black Roses crafted in 1876 by Joseph Hallam from the first iron produced by the first Lithgow blast furnace, the second to be erected in NSW. Of a very high standard of artisanship, the Black Roses are said to have been intended as lapel decorations, but, having proved too heavy for this purpose, they came to be regarded as commemorative and decorative items. They were made by fusing together individual segments made on an anvil by a Mr C. Howell, a blacksmith, and were presented to a Mr Bladen, the father of Neville Bladen, who worked as a roller in the 10" rolling mill. The Manning, Wardle and Company saddle-tank steam locomotive engine known as "Possum" (originally 'Cyclopes') has the 0-4-0 wheel arrangement typical of industrial locomotive of its era. Imported from the UK in 1912 and used at the Lithgow iron and steel works, where it regularly ran past Eskbank House. In 1928 it was transferred to A.I.S. Port Kembla, where it worked until 1967. In 1969 it was brought by rail to Lithgow and moved along a temporary siding onto the grounds of Eskbank House, where it is displayed on a short length of track.

The collection is historically associated with Eskbank House by way of a commonality of ownership between the house and the entities involved in iron and steel making.

=== Lithgow Pottery Collection ===
Housed within an outbuilding constructed in 1993 to the south of the main dwelling, this is composed of pottery and other items associated with the former Lithgow Valley Pottery Company. Stone for the pottery display building was taken from the stables at Barton Park (formerly Wallerawang), the Walker family homestead demolished for the Wallerawang Power Station dam. Care was taken to ensure that the fabric of the building was complementary with that of the stables and house. The collection, of which many items have been donated by local residents, comprises domestic wares illustrating the everyday lives of working-class and middle-class people of its period. The collection includes Bristol-glazed stoneware and Rockingham-glazed, Majolica-glazed and cane-glazed items, and is said to demonstrate the full range of the Lithgow Pottery's catalogue.

The simpler wares include teapots and a teapot ornament; bread trays; plates; water monkeys; bowls; mixing bowls; cheese covers and bases; jars; plant pots; tobacco barrels; pots; a Grecian pot and lid; saucers; a spirit drum; slip moulds; a storage pot; a milk churn; a table spittoon; a cake stand; a cake plate; a leaf platter; jelly moulds; flasks; pipkins; an ashtray; jars; a bedpan; a flour canister and lid; a Palace water filter and filter unit; flower pots; and garden edging.

The collection also includes bricks; pottery moulds; sewerage and water pipes; flower pots; chimney pots; ledgers; moulds; bonding and shaping tools and a ceramic roller; and photographs and documents associated with the pottery. The collection is NSW's largest collection of items related to the Lithgow Pottery, rivalled only by that held by the Museum of Applied Arts and Sciences. None of these items are known to be historically associated with Eskbank House.

=== Sir Joseph Cook Collection ===
This was donated to the Lithgow District Historical Society in 1994 by Peter Cook, grandson of Sir Joseph Cook, in connection with a lecture about Sir Joseph and his association with Lithgow, where he worked as a coal miner at the Vale of Clwydd Colliery. It includes an original, framed silver gelatine photograph of Sir Joseph and fellow Methodist lay preachers. This was presented to Sir Joseph's wife, Lady Mary Cook, by the Methodist Local Preachers' Association of NSW. It also includes a framed photograph of Sir Joseph; and a framed commission appointing him as Australian High Commissioner to the United Kingdom, an office held by him between 1921 and 1927. The collection further includes an original, framed photograph of Sir Joseph, and also a framed display of 1972 postage stamps commemorating the anniversary of Sir Joseph's swearing-in as Prime Minister on 24 June 1913. None of these items are known to be historically associated with Eskbank House.

=== Items within Eskbank House ===
There are several other collections currently within Eskbank House. These have not been assessed, but may be of local heritage significance. These are the Bracey Collection, which includes items donated by the Bracey family for the furnishing of Eskbank House; the Eskbank Manufacturing Collection, which includes items associated with the industries of the Eskbank Estate; the Lithgow Social History Collection, which includes items associated with the social history of Lithgow; the Lithgow Valley Colliery Company Collection, which includes items associated with the Lithgow Valley Colliery Company; the Lithgow Co-operative Collection, which includes items donated by the Lithgow Co-operative to the Lithgow District Historical Society; the Lithgow Industries Collection, which includes items manufactured in Lithgow but not included in the other collections; and the so-called Other Collection and Props Collection, which include items not catalogued in other collections as well as duplicate items and items with no provenance.

=== Items in the grounds ===
These include a Buffalo Pits traction engine, a Barford and Perkins Pioneer road roller and "Possum", a steam locomotive. Purchased in 1917 by the Neubeck brothers to haul coal from their Commonwealth Colliery, the traction engine was subsequently used at Neubeck's Lidsale sawmills until, in 1969, it was transferred to Eskbank House. The road roller, previously owned by Harry Rosen, was used in the demolition of the Lithgow Woollen Mills terrace houses. These items are of local heritage significance. The locomotive is described elsewhere.

=== Condition ===
As at 21 September 2017, the house and its associated historic outbuildings stand in good condition and are well maintained. Items enclosed within the grounds are in fair to good condition, although these, and in particular the locomotive, would benefit from increased protection against the elements. Items stored or displayed in association with the various collections housed within the dwelling and outbuildings vary in condition according to form and provenance. The items constituting the Lithgow Blast Furnace Collection, the Lithgow Pottery Collection and the Sir Joseph Cook Collection are in good condition, with the exception of the document commissioning Sir Joseph as High Commissioner to the United Kingdom; this item requires attention from a conservator.

Eskbank House and its associated historic outbuildings are substantially intact, with possible archaeological evidence of now-demolished outbuildings. Items associated with the Lithgow Iron Works and Blast Furnace Collection, Lithgow Pottery Collection and Sir Joseph Cook Collection are in variable condition, but are substantially intact.

=== Modifications and dates ===
- 1860s-1870s – two symmetrical sandstone-built service wings with inward-facing verandahs were added at rear. These will have replaced the original outbuildings, which were presumably of slabs or rough-sawn boards.
- c. 1925 – William Henry Mortlock, at that time residing in the house, had the open courtyard fully roofed and timber-floored, and also added a fireplace. He also had the breakfast room enlarged. These modifications were sympathetic to the original fabric, and remain extant. At this time, too, an outdoor laundry was added. It may also have been at around this time that some chimneys were raised and chimney pots were fitted, presumably to improve draughting.
- 1940s – the house was converted into flats, primarily for the accommodation of armaments workers. This included the construction of unsympathetic, skillion-roofed additions.
- c. 1960 - 1966 – the roof was replaced, as was the timber flooring. The laundry was demolished, as were the skillion-roofed additions associated with the flats, inadvertently removing the original western verandah.
- c. 1966 – a new entry and car park were provided, with access via newly-formed Bennett Street, in association with the reuse of the house and outbuildings as a museum.
- 1986 – conservation works, associated with the National Estate Grants program, took place. These included the replacement of the north-western chimney. Three sash windows on the western elevation were replaced.
- 1993 – a sandstone building, largely matching the stone of the existing buildings, was constructed in the grounds to house items associated with the Lithgow Pottery Company. The stone was reused from the demolished Barton Park stables.

== Heritage listing ==
As at 14 November 2017, Eskbank House, incorporating a principal dwelling, several outbuildings and garden, is of state heritage significance in demonstrating the manner in which Lithgow developed from an isolated, rural locality into a city influential in the social and economic development of NSW. It is also of state heritage significance for its strong association with the Eskbank Estate, a cradle of NSW industrial development and particularly that of iron and steel making. It is also of state heritage significance for its strong association with Thomas Brown, whose business activities provided the genesis of the City of Lithgow, and for its special association with industrialists James Rutherford; William Sandford; and George and Charles Hoskins, all of whom played important roles in the NSW iron and steel industries. Eskbank House is also of state heritage significance in demonstrating the manner in which nineteenth century NSW homestead complexes have been adapted to serve evolving social and economic requirements, including those associated with changing land use and the development of new industries. The complex is also of state heritage significance for its aesthetic and architectural values, together with its demonstration of the high quality of materials and artisanship available to a well-connected NSW settler during its period of construction.

The Lithgow Iron Works and Blast Furnace Collection is also of state heritage significance for its special association with the Lithgow iron and steel works, an enterprise of great importance in the industrialisation of NSW. It is also of state heritage significance for its ability to provide further information as to social and technical aspects of the NSW iron and steel industries of the nineteenth and twentieth centuries, as demonstrated by the three so-called Lithgow Black Roses, which are themselves items of great interest and artisanship.

The Lithgow Pottery Collection is of state heritage significance for its special association with the Lithgow Valley Pottery Company, and in demonstrating the influence of the NSW pottery industry on the domestic tastes and everyday lives of the NSW working- and middle-classes in the nineteenth century and early twentieth century. It is of state heritage significance as a fine collection of aesthetically interesting items of pottery produced by an enterprise important in the NSW industry, and also in providing benchmarks against which unprovenanced pottery items may be assessed.

The Sir Joseph Cook Collection is of state heritage significance in demonstrating the influence on NSW of the Labor Movement, and particularly its ability to support the rise of an individual such as Sir Joseph Cook from coal miner to Prime Minister. It is also of state heritage significance in providing information as to the life and career of Sir Joseph, especially in its incorporation of unique items such as the document commissioning him as Australian High Commissioner to the United Kingdom.

Eskbank House was listed on the New South Wales State Heritage Register on 24 August 2018 having satisfied the following criteria.

The place is important in demonstrating the course, or pattern, of cultural or natural history in New South Wales.

Eskbank House is of state heritage significance in demonstrating the manner in which Lithgow developed from an isolated, rural locality into the colony's third most important industrial area, so stimulating the economic development of NSW. It is also of state heritage significance for its strong associations with the Eskbank Estate, on which were situated industries including brick and pottery making, copper smelting and iron and steel making. Eskbank House is of state heritage significance for its special association with the period during which the Lithgow iron and steel industry was controlled by Hoskins Iron and Steel Company Ltd, a firm that as Australian Iron and Steel Ltd established at Port Kembla an integrated steel works that has for decades dominated Australian steelmaking.

The Lithgow Iron Works and Blast Furnace Collection is of state heritage significance for its special association with the Eskbank iron and steel works, an enterprise of great importance in the industrialisation of NSW. The contents of the collection, and in particular the so-called Lithgow Black Roses, demonstrate milestones in the development of the Australian iron and steel industry, and provide evidence as to the effect on the economy and society of NSW of the activities of some outstanding NSW industrial entrepreneurs.

The Lithgow Pottery Collection is of state heritage significance through its strong association with the Lithgow Valley Pottery Company, and in demonstrating the influence of the NSW pottery industry on the domestic tastes and everyday lives of the NSW working- and middle- classes in the late nineteenth century and early twentieth century. The collection also provides an insight into the effects of changing social and economic conditions on the lives of NSW pottery workers.

The Sir Joseph Cook Collection is of state heritage significance in demonstrating the influence on NSW of the nineteenth century Labor Movement, and in particular the ability of that movement to advance talented members of the working class to some of the highest offices in the land.

The place has a strong or special association with a person, or group of persons, of importance of cultural or natural history of New South Wales's history.

Eskbank House is of state heritage significance for its association with Thomas Brown, one of the earliest European settlers of the Lithgow Valley, and the founder of the Eskbank Estate. It was Brown who opened the first large-scale colliery on the Western Coalfield, a resource which has significantly contributed to the economy and society of NSW. As a lessor, Brown was instrumental in the establishment at Lithgow of industries important to the development of NSW: these include the making of bricks, pipes and pottery; the smelting of copper; and the making of iron and steel. Brown's social attitudes did much to establish the urban character of Lithgow, while his endowment of land and resources stimulated the establishment of the city's cultural, educational and religious institutions.

Eskbank House is of local heritage significance for its association with William Mortlock, manager of the Lithgow iron and steel works on behalf of Hoskins Iron and Steel Ltd.

The Lithgow Iron Works and Blast Furnace Collection is of state heritage significance for its special association with industrialists James Rutherford; William Sandford; and George and Charles Hoskins, all of whom played important roles in the development of the NSW iron and steel industries.

The Lithgow Pottery Collection is of state heritage significance for its association with James Silcock, a highly skilled potter who was instrumental in the establishment of the Lithgow pottery, and went on to become an important figure in the NSW pottery industry.

The Sir Joseph Cook Collection is of state heritage significance for its special association with the life and works of Sir Joseph Cook, a British immigrant and sometime Lithgow coal miner who as Defence Minister was instrumental in the establishment of the Lithgow Small Arms Factory. Sir Joseph became Prime Minister of Australia, and afterwards helped to establish an important new political party before being appointed Australian High Commissioner to the United Kingdom.

The place is important in demonstrating aesthetic characteristics and/or a high degree of creative or technical achievement in New South Wales.

Eskbank House is of state heritage significance as an architecturally interesting Colonial Georgian-style homestead with landmark qualities. Set on a knoll on the Lithgow Valley floor, the house enjoys vistas of the forested ridges that surround the City of Lithgow. The Garden House, which appears originally to have been a private museum of geological and other curiosities, is aesthetically distinctive in both design and execution.

The Lithgow Iron Works and Blast Furnace Collection is of state heritage significance for its demonstration of the progress of the NSW iron and steel industry, and particularly for its association with the first Lithgow blast furnace, the second to be erected in NSW. The so-called Lithgow Black Roses are redolent of the optimism and excitement surrounding the blowing-in of the blast furnace, a facility expected to transform Lithgow into an Australian Pittsburgh. They also demonstrate the very high levels of skill involved in moulding molten iron into complex and ornamental shapes, exemplifying the pride and artisanship of NSW iron and steel workers. The locomotive "Possum" demonstrates the transfer of iron steel making from Lithgow to an advanced iron and steel works at Port Kembla, one which was to become predominant in the Australian iron and steel industry.

The Lithgow Pottery Collection is of local heritage significance in exemplifying the taste, style and technologies associated with the Lithgow Valley Pottery, an enterprise important in the history of the NSW pottery industry. It is a collection of aesthetically interesting items, emblematic of the industry's achievements. The Rockingham-glazed items are a rich brown, while the Majolica-glazed items are multi-coloured. The Bristol-glazed items demonstrate the importance of domestic tableware, while the caneware is simple in its design. The simpler items are frequently decorated with rouletted (embossed) designs, with double-diamond and serpentine shapes predominant.

The place has potential to yield information that will contribute to an understanding of the cultural or natural history of New South Wales.

Eskbank House is of state heritage significance for its potential to provide information as to the life and scientific endeavours of Thomas Brown, founder of Lithgow. Lithgow is a city of much importance in the history of NSW industry, including coal mining, copper smelting, brick and pipe making, iron and steel making and weapons manufacture. Eskbank House is also of state heritage significance in demonstrating the high quality of materials and artisanship available to a well-connected NSW settler in the period between the termination of the convict assignment system and the onset of the economic depression of the 1840s. It also has state heritage significance as to potential archaeological evidence of now-demolished structures associated with the complex.

The Lithgow Iron Works and Blast Furnace Collection is of state heritage significance for its potential to yield further information as to social and technical aspects of the NSW iron and steel industry in the nineteenth and twentieth centuries.

The Lithgow Pottery Collection is of state heritage significance in benchmarking the range and scope of the Lithgow pottery enterprise, one important in the history of the pottery industry of NSW. It is also of state heritage significance in providing benchmarks against which unprovenanced pottery items may be assessed.

The Sir Joseph Cook Collection is of state heritage significance in informing research as to the life and career of Sir Joseph Cook, a figure important in the history of both NSW and the Commonwealth of Australia.

The place possesses uncommon, rare or endangered aspects of the cultural or natural history of New South Wales.

Eskbank House is of state heritage significance as a legible example of the European genesis of a NSW city.

The Lithgow Iron Works and Blast Furnace Collection is of state heritage significance as a rare grouping of items relating to the Lithgow iron and steel industry, one important in the social and economic development of NSW. The so-called Lithgow Black Roses may be of state heritage significance as items of great interest and artisanship. They are also of state heritage significance in celebrating the blowing in of the first Lithgow blast furnace, the second to be erected in NSW. The locomotive "Possum" is rare as a tangible link between the Lithgow and Port Kembla iron and steel works.

The Lithgow Pottery Collection is of state heritage significance in demonstrating traditional pottery techniques historically associated with the NSW pottery industry, and are of state heritage significance in providing evidence as to NSW domestic life in the nineteenth and twentieth centuries.

The Sir Joseph Cook Collection is of state heritage significance for its incorporation of unique items such as the document commissioning Sir Joseph as Australian High Commissioner to the United Kingdom.

The place is important in demonstrating the principal characteristics of a class of cultural or natural places/environments in New South Wales.

Eskbank House is of state heritage significance as a fine example of an early 1840s Victorian Georgian-style homestead complex, constructed with the assistance of convict labour under the supervision of a highly skilled stonemason, and demonstrating the principal characteristics of its type.

The Lithgow Pottery Collection is of state heritage significance as NSW's largest collection of Lithgow pottery. It constitutes an excellent representation of the range of wares produced by the pottery, and because of its integrity is highly esteemed. The collection contains examples of all the glazing types employed by the pottery, including the striking dappled effect of Majolica; the rich brown of Rockingham; and the simpler effect of Bristol and caneware.

== See also ==
- Australian residential architectural styles
