= Märta Eketrä =

19th-century Swedish lady-in-waiting

Märta Elisabeth Margareta Eketrä (4 November 1851 in Stockholm – 26 August 1894, in Ulriksdal Palace), was a Swedish lady-in-waiting, favorite and confidant of Queen Sophia of Sweden.

Eketrä was the daughter of the noble-born colonel and courtier Johan Gabriel Eketrä and Stanislas Margareta Tersmeden. During her childhood, she was a playmate of Louise of Sweden. She never married.

In 1872, she was appointed hovfröken (maid of honour) to the new queen after the accession of King Oscar II to the throne. In 1889, she was promoted to the post and rank of kammarfröken (the highest rank of an unmarried female courtier).

Eketrä was a favorite and confidante of Queen Sophia. She is noted to have been one of the queen's three favorite ladies-in-waiting, the other two being Countess Ida von Wedel-Jarlsberg and Ebba von Rosen. In 1878, it was Eketrä who introduced Sophia to the British preacher Lord Radstock, whose teachings came to have a great importance to the Queen. Eketrä acted as the spiritual caretaker of Sophia, and was often given the task of reading from the Bible during the queen's private devotions.

She accompanied the Queen on state visits, such as those to Romania and Constantinople in 1885. She took care of the practical arrangements during Sophia's illness in 1887, and nursed her after her dangerous operation that year. She also saw to it that the Queen's nursing school and hospital Sophiahemmet was organised according to Sophia's wishes: she acted as the queen's representative in the board of the institution during Sophia's convalescence, and was elected to its board in 1890.

She was described in retrospect:

When the twenty one-year-old Märta E. was appointed to the Household of the new Queen Sophia in 1872, she brought with her a personality of unusual qualities which came to have an important influence in that circle. The surface as such of the maid of honour E. was noticed. She had an impressive appearance, tall and straight and with pretty clean features. But she was of a greater importance as a person. Märta E. had the nature of a sovereign with a forceful will, a strong character and much independence. Her face could at times be that of haughty and judgmental contempt. But she also had a splendid, warm smile, expressive of other qualities which were just as important: en honesty, a true nobility and a willing self sacrifice and love of humanity beyond borders. All this gave her friends and impressed those who met her. United in friendship with the Queen's statsfru, Anna von Krusenstjerna, née countess Posse, Märta E. remained herself not only a humble servant of her royal mistress but also one of the most intimate friends of the Queen. A contributive factor to this was her reliable silence and tact. She has herself admitted, that she has been accustomed to receive the trusted secrets of others all her life. She always kept quiet about them.
