= William Rappard =

Swiss (American-born) academic and diplomat (1883–1958)

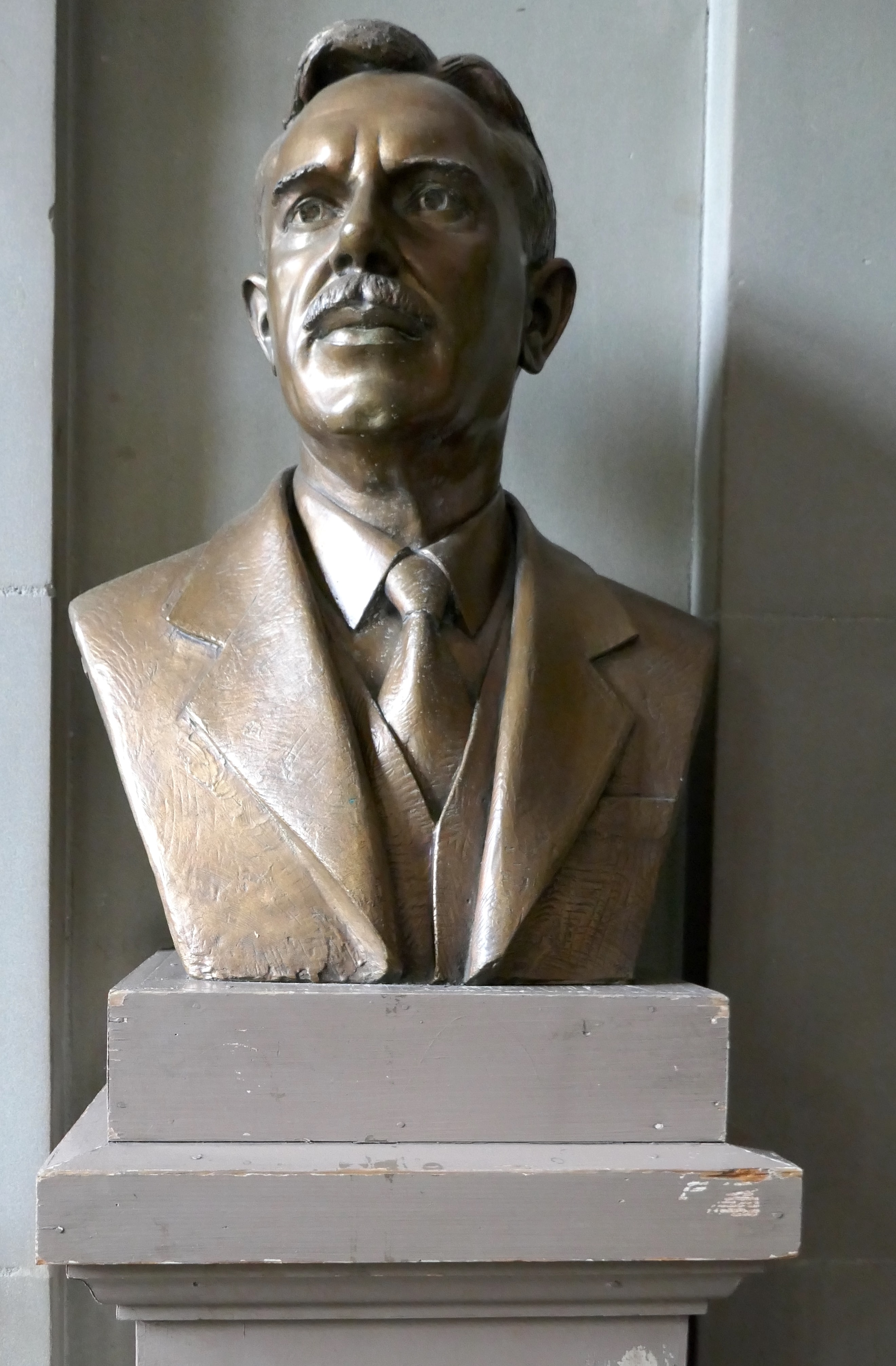

William Emmanuel Rappard (April 22, 1883, New York City – April 29, 1958) was a Swiss academic and diplomat.

Rappard was as a co-founder of the Graduate Institute of International Studies (now IHEID), Professor of Economic History at the University of Geneva, Rector of the University of Geneva in 1926, Director of the Mandate Section of the League of Nations Secretariat (and as a member of the Permanent Mandates Commission for all 18 years of its active life), and Swiss Representative at the International Labour Organization (ILO), as well as at the United Nations Organization (UN) and at the United States Embassy.

== Early life ==
William Emmanuel Rappard was born in New York to Swiss parents. His father worked as a representative of various Swiss industries in the United States. Rappard moved to Switzerland at the age of 17. William Rappard graduated from Harvard University in 1908. Between 1908 and 1909 he did additional study at the University of Vienna in Austria-Hungary.

== Career ==
Rappard was an assistant professor of economics at Harvard University from 1911 to 1913. In 1913, he became a professor at the University of Geneva. He worked for the League of Nations Secretariat. He resigned at the secretariat in 1924, becoming vice-rector at the University of Geneva. He was made an "extraordinary" member of the Permanent Mandates Commission, attending his first session of the Commission in June 1925. He served on the commission for the remainder of his life. According to historian Susan Pedersen, Rappard was the "leading presence" on the commission. Rappard was elected to the American Philosophical Society in 1941.

== Internationalism ==
Rappard was an internationalist, believing that international cooperation could overcome inter-state disputes, and that "native peoples" could be governed in their own interest and not in the interest of colonial powers. Rappard was not an anti-imperialist. He did not think that the territories in the League's mandates system were ready for self-government, alluding to "backward" people. During his time as Director of the Mandates Section of the League Secretariat, Rappard frequently clashed with General Secretary Eric Drummond. According to historian Susan Pedersen, "Rappard managed to imbue the Mandates Section and the Mandates Commission with a measure of his own independence and idealism."

Rappard was a member of various Swiss diplomatic missions including service with the Swiss delegation to the peace conference in France that ended the First World War. He made a strong impression on President Woodrow Wilson and was highly influential in persuading him to choose Geneva as headquarters of the League of Nations beginning in 1920. The headquarters of the World Trade Organization in Geneva, Switzerland (Centre William Rappard, built to house the International Labour Organization) and the Chemin William Rappard in Bellevue, Switzerland, have been named after him.

Co-founder of and director of the Graduate Institute of International Studies, Geneva in 1927 with Paul Mantoux, the economic historian. Rappard, himself delivered the opening address on April 1, 1947, to the Mount Pelerin conference. Present were some of the world's greatest economic thinkers. He made no apology for promoting the ideas of Von Mises, and the Austrian school, which held as its cardinal principle a return to laissez-faire unhampered free trade. The old ideas of dogmatism and intolerance must be abandoned, so that markets can be open and free, he opined, able to function normally. There was a cluster of exiles from Fascism and Nazism who congregated on the free city of Geneva. Rappard brought visiting scholars, and classical liberals seeking intellectual freedom. To F.A. Hayek and others in Helvetic economic colony the issue seemed clearly a straight fight between the forces of totalitarianism and those of freedom and social liberalism. Around Europe the march of state interventionism presented a problem for the administration of limited government. The intellectual Mont Pelerin Society, criticised by Von Mises, which must be based, he said on the principles of free entreprise; but instead governments used Police power to solve problems such as unemployment, and the absence of social insurance. Thanks to the generosity of the Rockefeller Foundation the Graduate Institute managed to survive the harsh economic climate of the 1930s.

Rappard was an internationalist who believed in human rights utterly rejecting the former Nazi and current communist regimes, which he had at once elucidated in a profound study, The Crisis of Democracy. People had little confidence in the way forward, he expostulated; a notion he later explored in Human Action (1949) by Von Mises.

From 1920 to 1925, director of the Mandates Division of the League at Geneva. And then he was a member of the Permanent Mandates Commission, 1925–29. He was also a member of the Swiss delegation to the League's Assembly, 1928–39. From 1927 to 1939, Rappard published a number of intellectual analyses on the international situation. Problems of Peace attempted to rationalise reparations and international conference system of diplomacy and the balance of power. And he was editor of a number of essays on The World Crisis.

The main principles of the classic economic liberalism that he promoted were ones that were dormant during a turbulent period of international relations. Rappard argued that free trade and immigration were essential to bring economic stability and prosperity to Europe and America. Without considerable interdependence between nations, competition between nations would inhibit business competitiveness. International Law must be allowed to flourish in an environment of co-operation. Furthermore, the League of Nations should be supported by permanent international institutions that could enforce a supra-national legal system to promote both peace and trade. Only such a system could prevent a repeat of the cataclysm of 1914–18 he told a school of economists at the University of Chicago in 1936. His ideas were directly inherited by Hayek and Friedman the leading political economists of the post-war era to influence American capitalism.

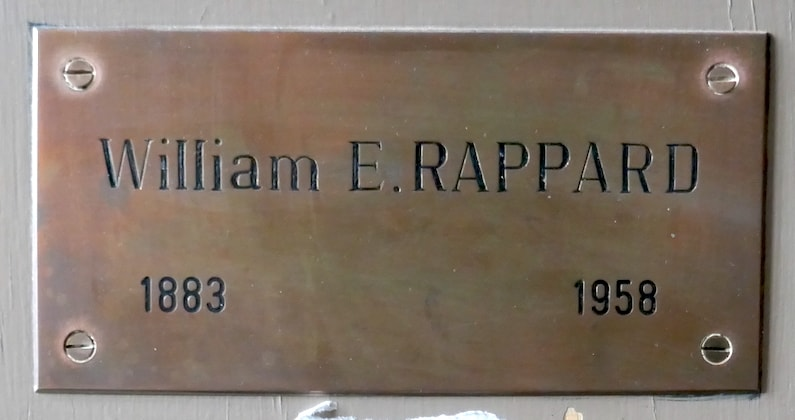

Rappard predicted the Soviet Union's redundant for Collectivism would cause the economy to implode under its own weight. In The Secret of American Prosperity, he tried to unravel the reasons for American high productivity and industrial success urging Europe to learn from it.

According to historian Susan Pedersen, he was "large, ruddy, curly-haired, and inveterately cheerful, Rappard looked like a Swiss farmer - but he was efficient, capable, and effortlessly trilingual... and had an expansive network of liberal internationalist friends."

== Publications ==
- International Relations as Viewed from Geneva (1925)
- Uniting Europe: The Trend of International Cooperation since the War (1930)
- The Post-War Economic problems and solutions for Poland, Austria, and Czechoslovakia (1931)
- The Geneva Experiment (1931)
- The Business Corporations of Massachusetts: Study of the history of Economics and Law Compared; Thesis at the Faculty of university degrees.
- The Common Menace of Economic and Military Armaments (1936)
- The Government of Switzerland. New York, Toronto, London: D. Van Nostrand Company, Inc. 1936 – via Internet Archive.
- The Individual and the State in the Evolution of the Swiss Constitution (1936)
- The Crisis of Democracy. Chicago, IL: University of Chicago Press. 1938 – via Internet Archive.
- The Quest for Peace since World War Two (1940)
- Pennsylvania and Switzerland: The Origins of the Swiss Constitution (1941)
- Collective Security in Swiss Experience, 1291–1948
- To what do we owe the Economic superiority of the United States?
- The Future of Peace according to Cordell Hull (1944)
- Switzerland the Organisation of Europe (1950)
- The Secret of American Prosperity (1955)

== See also ==
- Ludwig Von Mises
- International Red Cross Committee
