= Valentine Dannevig =

Norwegian teacher and principal

Valentine Dannevig (1872–1962) was a Norwegian teacher and principal who was a member of the Permanent Mandates Commission, a body of the League of Nations that oversaw the League's mandate system. She joined the Permanent Mandates Commission, replacing Anna Bugge-Wicksell in 1928. During her time on the commission, she was the sole female member. A feminist and progressive, she co-founded the Norwegian chapter of Women's International League for Peace and Freedom. She was an abolitionist. She was a proponent of a civilizing mission of empire.
