= Joseph Cook =

Prime Minister of Australia from 1913 to 1914

The Right Honourable Sir Joseph Cook GCMG
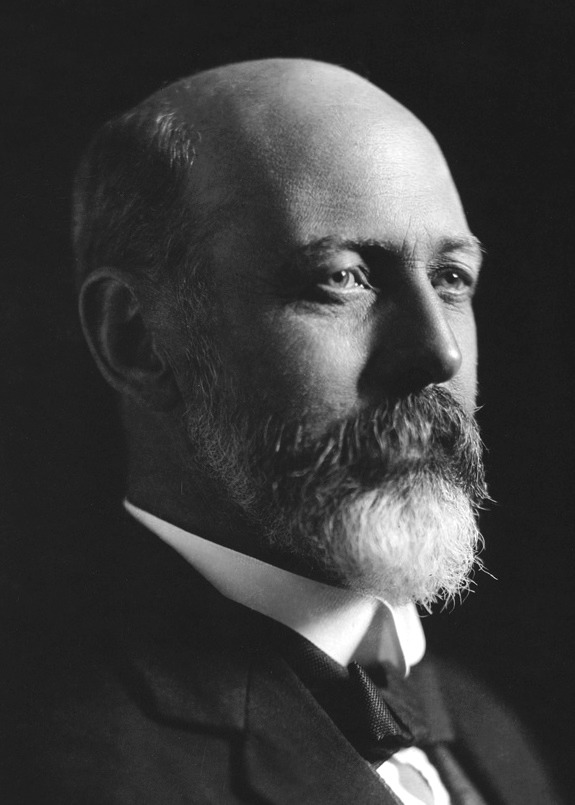
- Official portrait c. 1914

6th Prime Minister of Australia
- In office 24 June 1913 – 17 September 1914
- Monarch: George V
- Governors General: Lord Denman; Sir Ronald Munro Ferguson
- Preceded by: Andrew Fisher
- Succeeded by: Andrew Fisher

Leader of the Opposition
- In office 8 October 1914 – 17 February 1917
- Prime Minister: Andrew Fisher; Billy Hughes
- Preceded by: Andrew Fisher
- Succeeded by: Frank Tudor
- In office 20 January 1913 – 24 June 1913
- Prime Minister: Andrew Fisher
- Preceded by: Alfred Deakin
- Succeeded by: Andrew Fisher
- In office 26 November 1908 – 26 May 1909
- Prime Minister: Andrew Fisher
- Preceded by: George Reid
- Succeeded by: Alfred Deakin

Deputy Leader of the Opposition
- In office 1 July 1910 – 20 January 1913
- Leader: Alfred Deakin
- Preceded by: Gregor McGregor
- Succeeded by: John Forrest
- In office 26 May 1909 – 2 June 1909
- Leader: Alfred Deakin
- Succeeded by: Gregor McGregor
Party leadership positions
Leader of the Liberal Party
In office 20 January 1913 – 17 February 1917
Deputy	John Forrest
Preceded by	Alfred Deakin
Succeeded by	Party abolished
Leader of the Anti-Socialist Party
In office 26 November 1908 – 26 May 1909
Deputy	Vacant
Preceded by	George Reid
Succeeded by	Party abolished
Cabinet posts
Treasurer of Australia
In office 28 July 1920 – 20 December 1921
Prime Minister	Billy Hughes
Preceded by	William A. Watt
Succeeded by	Stanley Bruce
Minister for the Navy
In office 17 February 1917 – 28 July 1920
Prime Minister	Billy Hughes
Preceded by	Jens A. Jensen
Succeeded by	William Laird Smith
Minister for Home Affairs
In office 24 June 1913 – 17 September 1914
Prime Minister	Himself
Preceded by	King O'Malley
Succeeded by	William Archibald
Minister for Defence
In office 2 June 1909 – 29 April 1910
Prime Minister	Alfred Deakin
Preceded by	George Pearce
Succeeded by	George Pearce

High Commissioner to the United Kingdom
- In office 11 November 1921 – 10 May 1927
- Preceded by: Andrew Fisher
- Succeeded by: Granville Ryrie
Constituencies
Member of the Parliament of Australia for Parramatta
In office 30 March 1901 – 11 November 1921
Preceded by	Division created
Succeeded by	Herbert Pratten
Member of the New South Wales Parliament for Hartley
In office 6 June 1891 – 30 March 1901; Serving with George Donald (1891–1894)
Preceded by	John Hurley
Succeeded by	John Hurley

Personal details
- Born: Joseph Cooke; 7 December 1860 Silverdale, Staffordshire, England
- Died: 30 July 1947 (aged 86) Bellevue Hill, New South Wales, Australia
- Resting place: Northern Suburbs Crematorium, Sydney
- Party: Labor (until 1894); Independent (1894); Free Trade (1894–1909); Commonwealth Liberal (1909–1917); Nationalist (from 1917)
- Spouse: Mary Turner (m. 1885)
- Children: George Sydney; Albert; Joseph William; John Hartley; Annette Margaret; Winifred Emmie; Richard Cecil; Constance Mary; Raymond Fletcher
- Parents: William Cook (father); Margaret Fletcher (mother)
- Occupation: Politician; coal miner; trade unionist

Sir Joseph Cook (7 December 1860 – 30 July 1947) was the sixth prime minister of Australia, serving from 1913 to 1914. He held office as the leader of the Liberal Party, having previously been leader of the Anti-Socialist Party from 1908 to 1909. His victory at the 1913 election marked the first time that a centre-right party had won a majority at an Australian federal election.

Cook was born in Silverdale, Staffordshire, England, and began working in the local coal mines at the age of nine. He emigrated to Australia in 1885, settling in Lithgow, New South Wales. He continued to work as a miner, becoming involved with the local labour movement as a union official. In 1891, Cook was elected to the New South Wales Legislative Assembly as a representative of the Labor Party, becoming one of its first members of parliament. He was elected party leader in 1893, but the following year left Labor due to a disagreement over party discipline. He was then invited to become a government minister under George Reid, and joined Reid's Free Trade Party.

In 1901, Cook was elected to the new Federal Parliament representing the division of Parramatta. He became deputy leader of the federal Free Trade Party (later renamed the Anti-Socialist Party), again under George Reid, and in 1908 replaced Reid as party leader and Leader of the Opposition. In what became known as "the fusion", Cook agreed to merge his party with Alfred Deakin's Protectionist Party in 1909, forming a unified anti-Labor party for the first time. He became deputy leader of the new Liberal Party, allowing Deakin to become prime minister again, and was Minister for Defence until the government's defeat at the 1910 election.

Cook replaced Deakin as leader of the Liberals in January 1913, and a few months later won a one-seat majority over Andrew Fisher's Labor Party at the 1913 election. His party failed to secure a majority in the Australian Senate, making governing difficult, and as a result he engineered the first double dissolution. A new election was called for September 1914, at which the Liberals lost their majority; Fisher returned as prime minister. Cook was unable to pass much legislation during his time in office, but did oversee the early stages of Australia's involvement in World War I. He subsequently became Leader of the Opposition for a third time.

In 1917, Cook was involved in a second party merger, joining the Liberals with Billy Hughes's National Labor Party to form the Nationalist Party. He became the de facto deputy prime minister under Hughes, serving as Minister for the Navy (1917–1920) and Treasurer (1920–1921). He was a delegate to the 1919 Paris Peace Conference, where he was a member of the committee that determined the borders of Czechoslovakia, and along with Hughes was one of two Australians to sign the Treaty of Versailles. After leaving politics, Cook was High Commissioner to the United Kingdom from 1921 to 1927. He died at the age of 86 as one of the last survivors of the first federal parliament.

== Early years ==
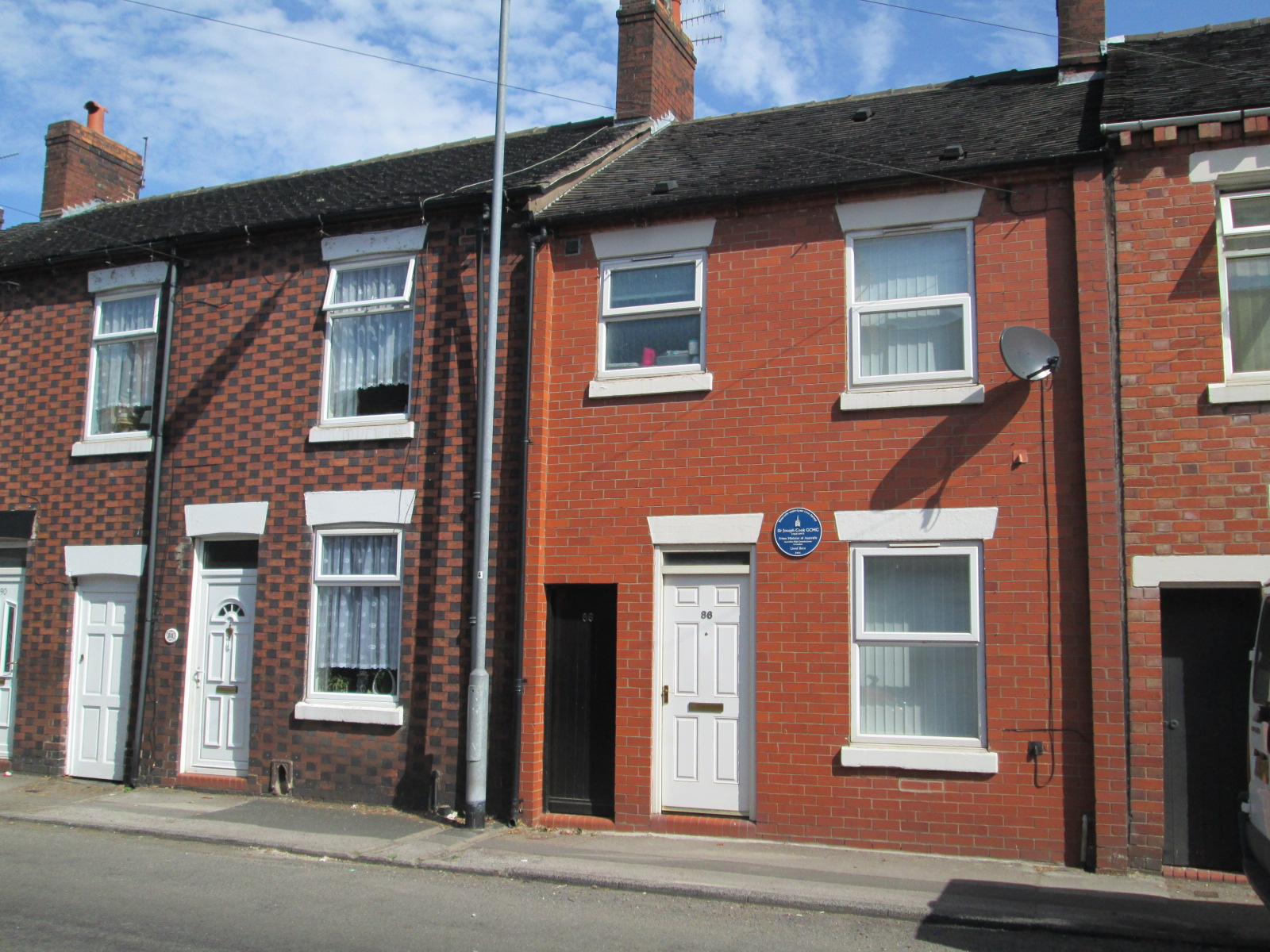
Cook lived in a small terraced house at 86 Newcastle Street for most of his childhood. The building now has a blue plaque commemorating his life.

Cook was born on 7 December 1860 in a small cottage in Silverdale, Staffordshire, England. He was the second of seven children born to Margaret (née Fletcher) and William Cooke. His older sister Sarah died in 1865, but his three younger sisters and two younger brothers lived to adulthood. Cook's parents moved to a one-up-one-down a few months after his birth, before eventually settling in a terraced house on Newcastle Street. The children shared a single room and two beds, and the family could rarely afford meat. Cook's father was a coal miner under the butty system at the nearby Hollywood pit. He was killed in a mining accident in April 1873, forcing his oldest son to become the family's primary source of income.

Cook's only formal education was at the school attached to St Luke's, the local Anglican church. He left school and began working in the coal mines at the age of nine, earning one shilling per day for ten to twelve hours of work. Beginning at four o'clock in the morning, his tasks were to attend to the horses and clean and oil the mining equipment. After the passage of the Elementary Education Act 1870, Cook was allowed to return to school until he reached the legal leaving age. He left school a second time after his father's death and returned to his former employment at the local colliery. However, as a result of his teacher's attention, together with that of his parents, an exceptionally strong ambition to improve his position became implanted in him. This ambition was to become one of his most prominent characteristics, revealed first in a drive for self-improvement and, later on in life, his determination to succeed in politics. During his teenage years, he embraced Primitive Methodism, and marked his conversion by dropping the "e" from his surname. On 8 August 1885, he married Mary Turner at Wolstanton, Staffordshire, and the couple eventually had five sons and three daughters.

Shortly after their marriage, the couple emigrated to New South Wales and settled in Lithgow, joining Cook's brother-in-law and a number of other former miners from Silverdale. Cook worked in the coal mines, becoming General-Secretary of the Western Miners Association in 1887. In 1888, he participated in demonstrations against Chinese immigration. He was also active in the Land Nationalisation League, which was influenced by the ideas of Henry George and strongly supported free trade, and was a founding member of the Labor Party in 1891.

== Early political career ==
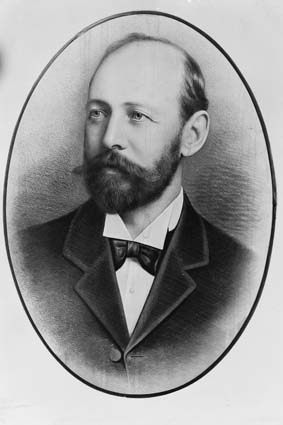
Cook in 1894

Cook was elected to the New South Wales Legislative Assembly as MP for the coalfields seat of Hartley in 1891, in Labor's first big breakthrough in Australian politics. It was the first time Labor had won a seat in any parliament in Australia.

In 1894, however, Cook was the leader of those parliamentarians who refused to accept the Labor Party's decision to make all members sign a "pledge" to be bound by decisions of the Parliamentary Labor Party (Caucus). Cook's protest was based on Labor's attitude to the tariff question in particular, with his preference for free trade being increasingly at odds with his party. It was also based on his religious beliefs, which valued independence of conscience as a necessary moral imperative. By the end of the year, he had become a follower of George Reid's Free Trade Party, and for years afterwards he was seen as a 'class traitor' by Labor. Cook for his part maintained that the original Labor Party of 1891 was an entirely separate entity from the pledged party, hence that he had never been a member of what became the Labor Party. He became an invaluable ally of Reid, despite the fact that the two men had distinctly different characters, and remained colleagues only at a distance.

Cook was appointed Postmaster-General of New South Wales when Reid formed a government in August 1894. He chaired two intercolonial post and telegraph (P&T) conferences in 1896, at which the Australian colonies agreed to fund a Pacific Cable linking Australia to North America. In opening the first conference, he spoke of the "federal spirit [...] animating most of our Australasian national endeavours at the present time". It was eventually resolved that the colonies would contribute equally to funding the cable rather than on a simple per-capita basis, an agreement which "marked a turning point in the achievement of 'practical Federation'" and foreshadowed the development of a Senate with equal representation for each state. According to Kevin Livingston, who wrote a history of pre-Federation telecommunications in Australia, he "deserves to be recognised as having played an influential, mediating role in leading the Australian colonies towards technological federalism in the mid-1890s".

== Federal Parliament ==
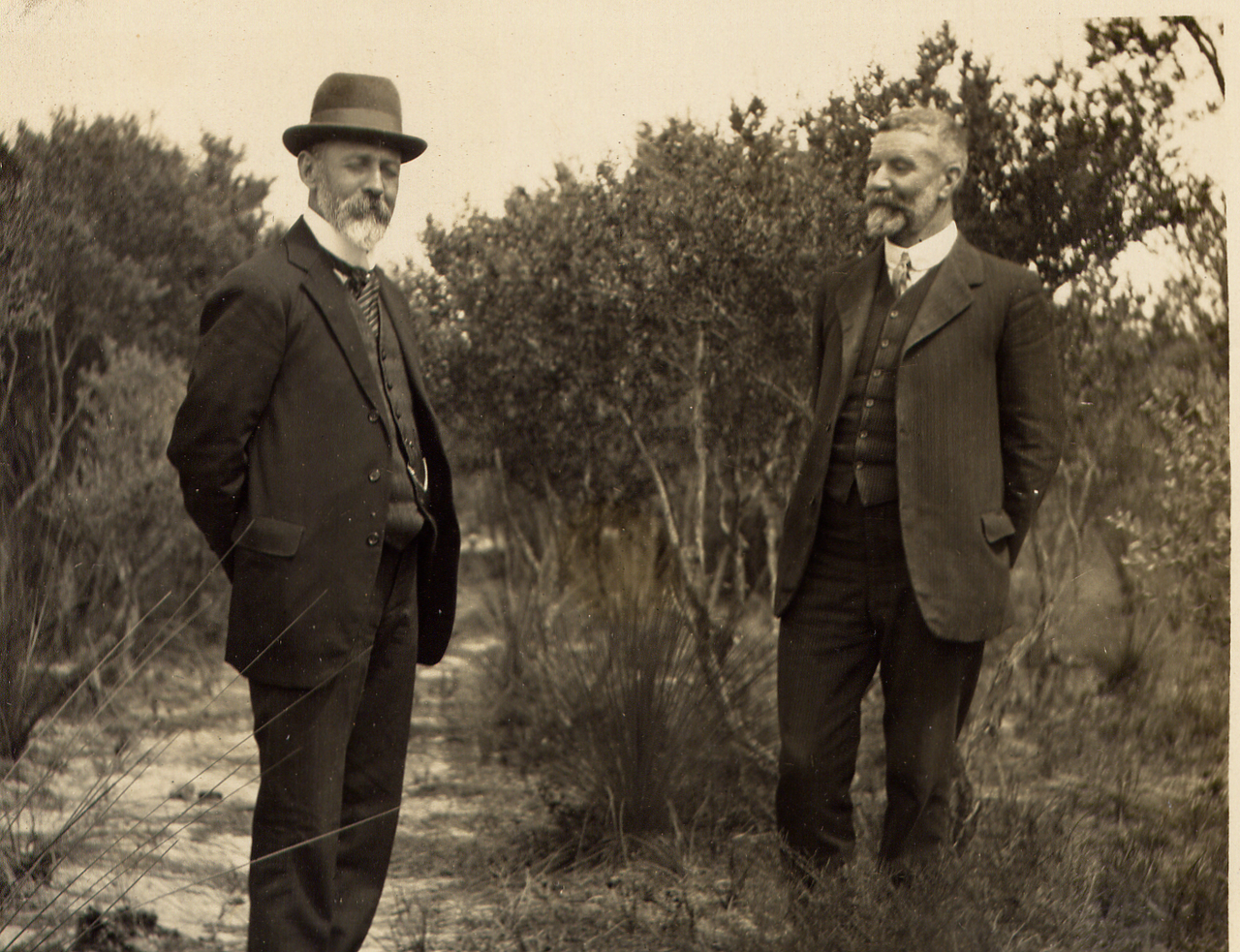
Cook and Alfred Deakin together in 1909

Despite supporting federation in principle, Cook campaigned for a no vote at the first referendum on federation in 1898. He believed that a Senate which gave equal representation to each state regardless of population was undemocratic, and he was also a strong believer in the liberal concept of subsidiarity, the idea that political decisions are best made at the most local level. For the same reason, he would strongly oppose the 1911 and 1913 referendums seeking to enlarge the powers of the federal government.

Cook initially had no plans to enter federal politics, hoping instead to succeed Reid as premier of New South Wales. However, the party wanted a high-profile candidate to stand against William Sandford in Parramatta, a large electorate spanning from Parramatta on the outskirts of Sydney across the Blue Mountains to Lithgow. Reid offered the position of Postmaster-General in a future government as an inducement, but Cook did not agree to stand until a few weeks before the election. He was elected with a substantial majority, following a bitter campaign in which he accused Sandford of adopting political positions for self-benefit. The Free Traders failed to win government from the Protectionists, with Reid becoming Leader of the Opposition.

In the first term of federal parliament, Cook developed a reputation as a master of parliamentary procedure and tactics, "always ready to speak, as often and as long as required". He spoke in favour of nationalising the iron industry and introducing compulsory conciliation and arbitration, views in line with his previous political affiliation. Opposing tariffs because they increased the price of goods needed for working families, in 1902 he would suggest that "no man ought be in the position of Minister for Trade and Customs unless he had at least ten children". In June 1901 he moved from Lithgow to a larger house in Marrickville, in Sydney's Inner West. Cook was re-elected with an increased majority at the 1903 election. He stood for the deputy leadership of the opposition when parliament resumed, but was defeated by Dugald Thomson, and was overlooked for ministerial office when Reid formed a government in August 1904. This was arguably because he had suffered a severe bout of illness that had kept him absent from Parliament for two months.

By 1904, Cook had become stridently anti-socialist, in line with Reid's decision to reposition the Free Traders as the party of anti-socialism. Some of his previous political positions were abandoned, possibly to gain the trust of party colleagues who had been suspicious of his links with the labour movement. He instead came to espouse liberalism, regarding its views about personal freedom as closely aligned with Methodism's understanding of the role of the individual in developing morality. He believed that his own story proved that Australia was a land of great social mobility, and that the nation should continue to support individual opportunity rather than risking a socialist revolution in which the state would be empowered to control individuals. In 1905 he accepted the position of deputy chairman of the Australian Liberal League, an organisation formed to support the anti-socialists in the lead-up to the next election.

During the Reid government, Cook filled a role similar to the later position of Leader of the House, assisting Reid with parliamentary tactics without being burdened by a ministerial portfolio. Reid had hoped to call an early election and entrusted Cook with organising the anti-socialist campaign. However, in June 1905 Protectionist leader Alfred Deakin withdrew his support from the government and formed a new administration, with Labor support.

Cook was unanimously elected deputy leader of the Anti-Socialists on 28 July 1905, following Thomson's resignation. He "started a political vendetta against Deakin", which "perfectly suited the mood of the party". The Anti-Socialists ran a negative campaign with few policy specifics at the 1906 election, and the Protectionist–ALP alliance continued. He was re-elected unopposed, following a redistribution which saw Parramatta lose much of its working-class areas. In 1908 he moved to Baulkham Hills.

When Reid resigned as party leader on 16 November 1908, Cook succeeded him the following day, and agreed to merge the Anti-Socialist Party (the Free Trade Party had been renamed prior to the 1906 federal election) with Alfred Deakin's Protectionists, in an effort to counter Labor's popularity. Cook became deputy leader of the new Commonwealth Liberal Party, also known as "the Fusion." Cook was Defence Minister in Deakin's 1909–1910 ministry, then succeeded Deakin as Liberal leader when the government was defeated by Labor in the 1910 elections. Cook had, by this time, become completely philosophically opposed to socialism.

== Prime minister ==
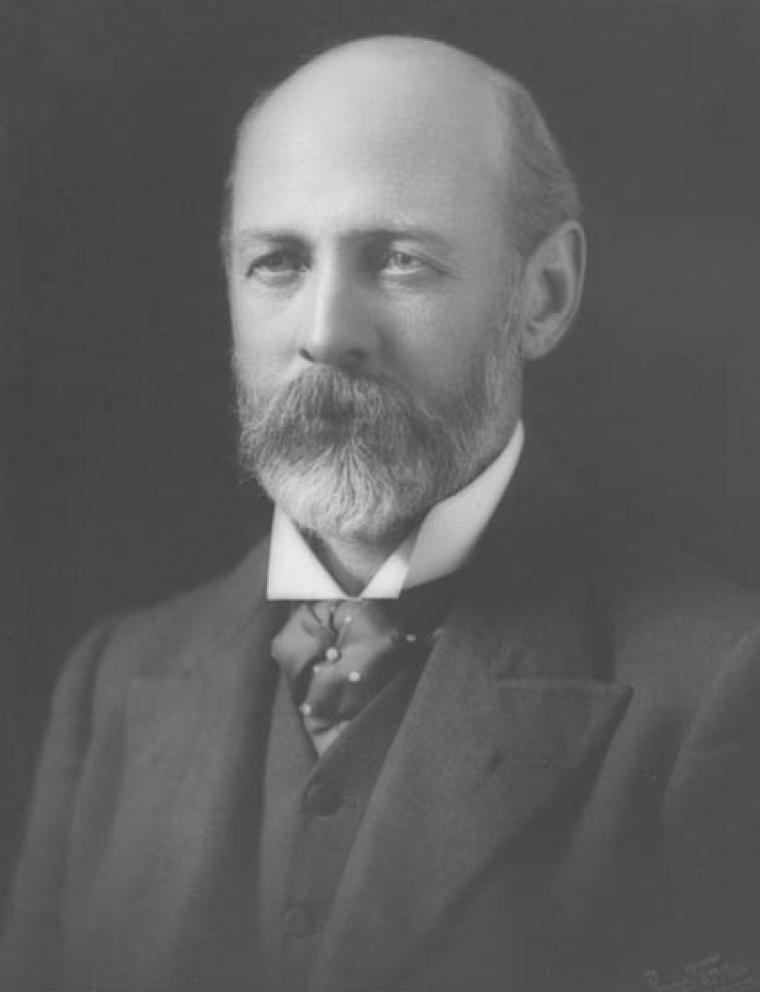
Cook c. 1914

At the 1913 election, Cook championed private enterprise and attacked Labor's "socialist objective" as the "principle that the state must become more and more omnipotent, until it eventually takes over all the actions of the individual, shaping and determining all our production, distribution and exchange". The Commonwealth Liberal Party led by Cook won a one-seat majority in the House of Representatives over the Labor Party, led by Andrew Fisher, and defeated its 6 referendum proposals.

Cook thus became the sixth Prime Minister of Australia, at the head of a conservative administration. However, Labor still had a majority in the Senate. Unable to govern effectively due to the hostile Senate, Cook decided to trigger a double dissolution under section 57 of the Constitution of Australia, the first time that provision had been used. He introduced a bill abolishing preferential employment for trade union members in the public service. As expected, the Senate rejected the bill, giving Cook an excuse to seek a double dissolution. World War I broke out in the middle of the resulting campaign for the September 1914 election. Andrew Fisher was able to remind voters that it was Labor that had favoured an independent Australian defence force, which the conservatives had opposed. Cook was also greatly hindered by the fact that he had to cut short his campaign to focus on war matters, at a time when there were few alternatives to in-person political rallies. Cook was defeated after a five-seat swing, and Fisher's Labor Party resumed office.

=== World War I ===
Cook was prime minister for the first six weeks of Australia's involvement in World War I. On 30 July 1914, he was informed via telegram that the British government was considering a declaration of war and advised that Australia should take appropriate defence precautions. He told an election meeting at Horsham, Victoria, the following day to "remember that when the Empire is at war, so is Australia at war". At the suggestion of Governor-General Ronald Munro Ferguson, Cook called an emergency cabinet meeting for 3 August. It was attended by only four members of his ministry, as the others were out campaigning and unable to travel to Melbourne in time. The government decided to offer an expeditionary force of 20,000 men – "of any suggested composition to any destination desired [...] at complete disposal of the Home Government; cost of despatch and maintenance would be borne by this Government" – and to give the British Admiralty control of the Royal Australian Navy "when desired". Australia's offer was made 40 hours before the United Kingdom declared war on Germany, and it has been suggested that it may have intensified the pressure on the British government to enter the war, along with similar offers made by Canada and New Zealand. The United Kingdom formally accepted Australia's offer on 6 August, and Cook subsequently authorised the creation of the Australian Imperial Force and the Australian Naval and Military Expeditionary Force; the latter captured and then occupied German New Guinea within a few months. Writing in 1962, Malcolm Henry Ellis described him as "the activator and originator of Australia's war effort". Cook would have three sons serve in the AIF during the war, one of whom was twice wounded at Gallipoli but miraculously survived.

== Hughes government ==
After Fisher resigned from parliament in 1915, Billy Hughes became Labor leader and prime minister. In 1916, Hughes began a determined push for the introduction of conscription for military service, causing a split in the Labor Party over the issue. However, Hughes was able to stay in office after getting parliamentary support from Cook and his party. Cook was initially reluctant to support conscription as it violated his longstanding opposition to compulsion, but eventually he concluded that “manhood suffrage denoted manhood responsibility”. Later in 1916, the so-called National Labor Party, consisting of those Labor members who supported Hughes, merged with the Commonwealth Liberals to form the Nationalist Party, as Cook decided to sacrifice his party's liberal identity and philosophy in the name of winning the war at any cost. A Federal Liberal Party would not re-emerge until 1944. Although it was dominated by former Liberals, Hughes was named the new party's leader, with Cook as deputy leader. Cook became Minister for the Navy and de facto deputy prime minister in Hughes' reconfigured government. The Nationalists had substantial victories over Labor in the 1917 election and the 1919 election.

Although Cook was a loyal deputy to Hughes, "at no time did he develop any personal affection for him". He thought Hughes was autocratic and prone to taking credit for things that others had accomplished. He did however admire Hughes' strong leadership and "immense energy", which contrasted with his own cautiousness. Cook was acting prime minister on a number of occasions when Hughes was overworked or on visits abroad. In parliament, he was effectively the Leader of the House (a title which did not yet exist), responsible for the passage of government business. He campaigned strongly for the "Yes" vote in the second conscription plebiscite in 1917, touring three states and giving multiple speeches each day. The "No" vote won, and Hughes fulfilled his earlier promise to resign as prime minister, although he remained in office as a caretaker. In determining who should be prime minister, Governor-General Ronald Munro Ferguson spoke first with Opposition Leader Frank Tudor, who declined to form a government, and then with senior members of the Nationalist Party. Cook's advice that "only Hughes" was suitable proved decisive in Munro Ferguson recommissioning him as prime minister, rather than another Nationalist like John Forrest.

=== Overseas activities ===
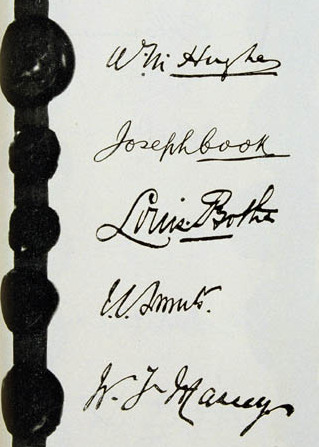
Cook's signature on the Treaty of Versailles, situated after that of Hughes and before those of Louis Botha, Jan Smuts, and William Massey

Cook and Hughes represented Australia at the 1918 Imperial War Conference in London. They left together on 26 April 1918, with William Watt as acting prime minister in their absence. Cook participated in all fifteen sessions of the conference, but found that the most important work was being undertaken by Hughes behind closed doors; he was generally not consulted. After the conference concluded he paid an extended visit to the Western Front, accompanied by his adviser John Latham, author Arthur Conan Doyle, and war correspondent Charles Bean. They were taken within 1,000 yards (910 m) of the Hindenburg Line, near Bullecourt, and at one point a shell exploded less than a minute before they arrived at a meeting point. Cook visited Australian Army camps in South England and toured the British dockyards, consulting with Admiral John Jellicoe about the future of the Royal Australian Navy. He also visited his home town of Silverdale for the first time since he left England in 1886, and paid another visit to celebrate the signing of the Armistice of 11 November 1918.

Cook was one of the Australian delegates at the Paris Peace Conference, 1919, which was led by Hughes. Although Australia and the other Dominions signed the Treaty of Versailles separately and became individual members of the League of Nations, for the preceding negotiations their representatives (and those of the United Kingdom) were considered to form one single British Empire delegation. Cook was chosen as the lead British delegate on the Commission on Czechoslovak Affairs, which was tasked with determining the final borders of Czechoslovakia. He was hampered by his lack of knowledge of European geography and inability to speak French, the contemporary language of diplomacy. According to Charles Seymour, one of the American delegates, he was "blissfully ignorant of everything European and practically every word of our discussion was Greek to him". Harold Nicolson, the other British delegate, said that he assumed an attitude of "benevolent boredom" during meetings. Cook was generally in favour of an enlarged Czechoslovakia, believing that the lands of the Sudeten Germans had to be included in Czechoslovakia for security reasons. He and Nicolson had a difference of opinion over Great Schütt, but French delegation was in agreement with Cook and the island was awarded to Czechoslovakia.

The Treaty of Versailles was signed on 23 June 1919 with Cook and Hughes signing on behalf of Australia. Cook had some private misgivings about the final document. Although he believed Germany needed to be punished, he thought some elements of the treaty were too vindictive. He was strongly in favour of the creation of the League of Nations, and David Lloyd George considered him to be the most fervent supporter of the League in the entire British delegation. Lloyd George considered him "a man of calm and balanced judgment". Cook and Hughes arrived back in Australia on 24 August 1919, after an absence of nearly 16 months. They travelled from Fremantle to Melbourne via the Trans-Australian Railway, and Cook particularly enjoyed their stop at the small settlement of Cook, South Australia, which had been named in his honour a few years earlier. Hughes was feted upon his return, but Cook did not receive similar adulation and returned to Sydney relatively quietly. An early election was called to capitalise on the prime minister's popularity, which saw the Nationalists win re-election with a reduced majority.

=== Treasurer ===
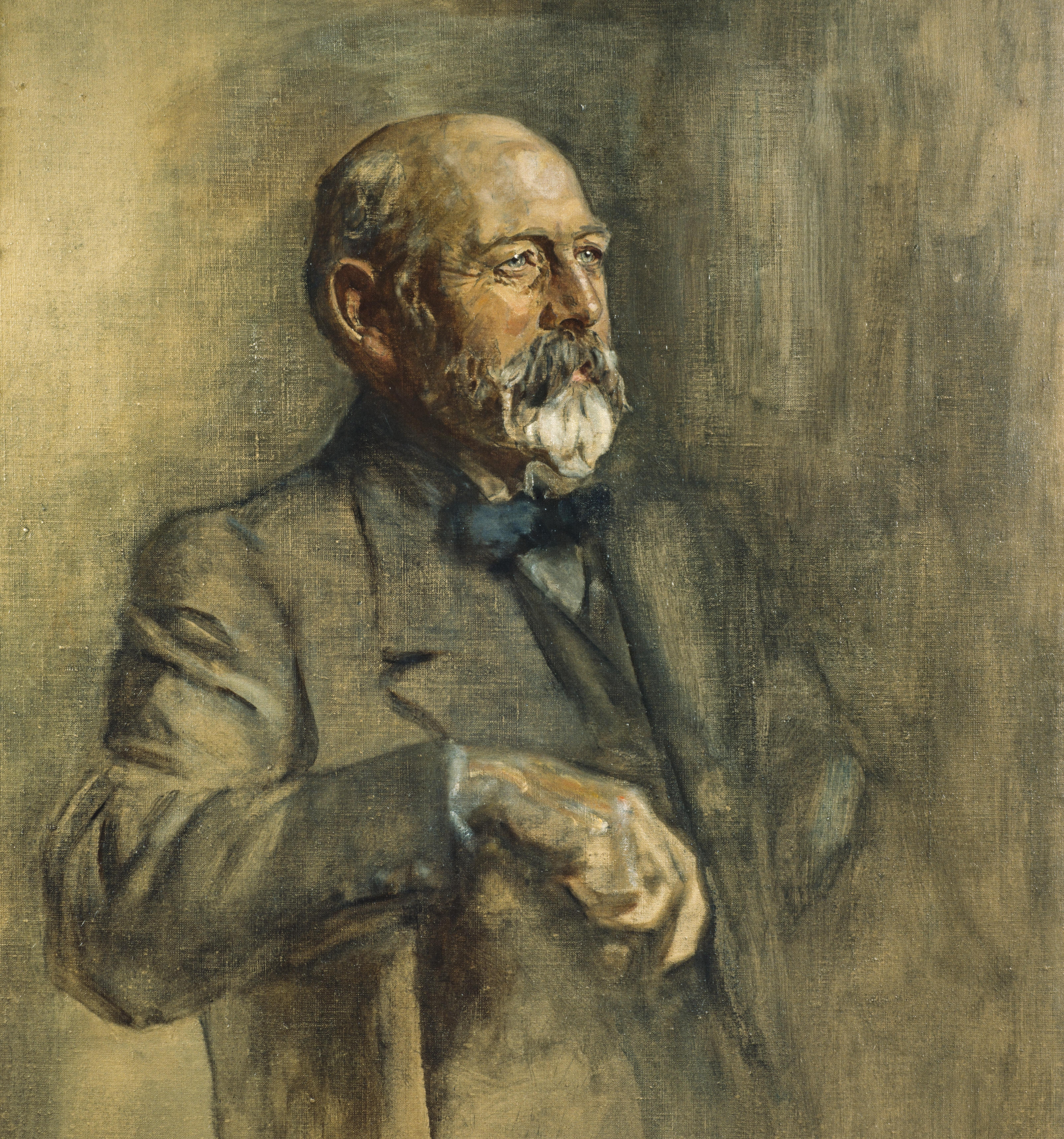
Portrait of Cook by James Guthrie, c. 1920

In March 1920, Cook was appointed Acting Treasurer in the absence of William Watt, who was attending a conference in London. Watt resigned by cable in June after falling out with Hughes. The position of Treasurer was initially offered to Stanley Bruce, who declined it, and then to Cook, who reluctantly accepted. He took office at the height of the post-war boom and was faced with high inflation, but also high unemployment as the economy attempted to absorb returned soldiers. Cook was a fiscal conservative by nature, preferring to limit government spending and keep taxes low. He brought down two budgets during his tenure, for the 1920–21 and 1921–22 financial years; both were primarily concerned with reducing inflation. He was twice faced with significant revenue shortfalls, which he chose to fill primarily with overseas loans and only a small increase in taxation. He found both options distasteful, but preferred lower taxes – the opposite approach to that taken by Canada, which faced a similar situation.

Cook has been viewed as an orthodox but unimaginative treasurer whose conservatism with regard to government spending may have been unsuited to the needs of post-war reconstruction. One notable initiative of his was the transfer of responsibility for issuing banknotes from the Treasury Department to the Commonwealth Bank. The bank's governor Denison Miller regarded this as "the first and most important step in the enlargement [of the Commonwealth Bank] into a national bank in every sense of the word". Cook's final months in parliament were spent as acting prime minister, as Hughes was out of the country for five months attending the 1921 Imperial Conference in London. In November 1921, it was announced that he would be appointed as Australia's High Commissioner to the United Kingdom in place of Andrew Fisher, whose term had ended earlier that year.

== High Commissioner to the United Kingdom ==
Cook arrived in London on 13 January 1922, where career diplomat Malcolm Shepherd had been chargé d'affaires for a year. His primary duties were to promote immigration, investment, and trade, as well as to assist in securing favourable loans for the state and federal governments. He played a key role in organising the Australian pavilion at the British Empire Exhibition of 1924. Cook represented Australia at the International Labour Conferences and the 1922 Genoa Conference, but did "little more than attend and subsequently report to his government". He was a more active participant at the League of Nations, where he was Australia's chief delegate. He appeared before the Permanent Mandates Commission on a number of occasions to answer questions about the administration of its League of Nations mandates, Nauru and New Guinea. Cook overhauled the administration of Australia House, significantly reducing the number of staff and the annual running costs. This brought him into conflict with Shepherd, his official secretary, who complained that he was "not an easy man to get on with".

Cook particularly enjoyed the social and ceremonial aspects of his new position. His first major engagement as High Commissioner was to represent Australia at the wedding of Princess Mary, and he also attended the wedding of the future George VI and Queen Elizabeth and the funeral of Queen Alexandra. He hosted regular social functions at Australia House, and mixed more easily in high society than his predecessor, whose partial deafness tended to make him withdrawn. Observers noted his "bonhomie and accessibility" in comparison to the "asperity and seclusiveness of Mr Fisher". Cook's term as High Commissioner formally concluded on 10 August 1927, after a six-month extension from the original five-year term. Leaving England ten days later, he and his wife were serenaded at the Port of Tilbury by the Australian opera singer Nellie Melba, who had become a close friend of theirs. John Cockburn wrote that "rarely has the retirement of one of the representatives in London of the Dominions been attended with such widespread expressions of regret".

== Final years and death ==
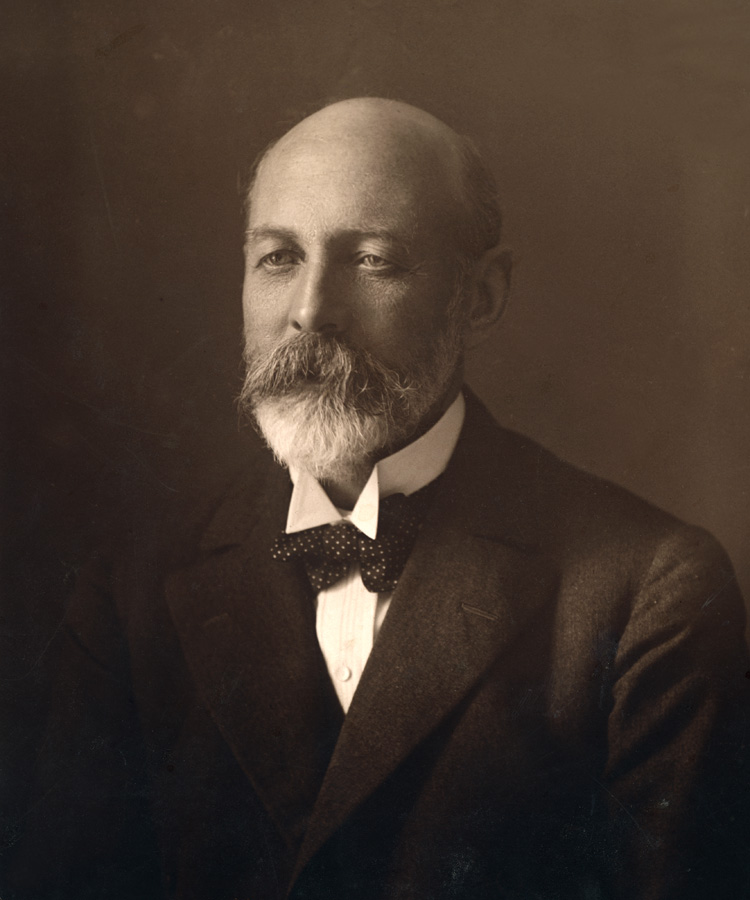
Cook in later life

Unlike his predecessors Reid and Fisher, Cook did not settle in London permanently after the end of his term as High Commissioner. He arrived back in Sydney in September 1927 and bought a large house in Bellevue Hill, overlooking Sydney Harbour. In 1930, he demolished the house and built a luxury apartment block called Silchester, designed by Leslie Wilkinson. He and his wife retired to one flat and lived on the income from the others. In 1928, Cook was appointed chairman of a royal commission into "the finances of South Australia, as affected by Federation". His co-commissioner Herbert Brookes wrote that "it has been a joy to be associated with you again, even though you have had it all your own way". The commission's report, handed down in 1929, found that South Australia had been disadvantaged by federal government policies that favoured New South Wales and Victoria, and should be compensated as a result. The report later became one of several documents used to justify the creation of the Commonwealth Grants Commission and the expansion of federal grants to state governments.

Cook enjoyed a low-profile retirement, with Smith's Weekly observing in 1936 that no other high-ranking politician had "staged such a swiftly effective fade-out from the public view on retirement from the hurly-burly". He was interviewed during the Sudeten Crisis and after the German invasion of Poland, on both occasions defending the Treaty of Versailles and blaming German aggression for the new war. Cook ignored requests to write his memoirs, and in fact destroyed many of his personal papers; this would later present difficulties for his biographers. His final public-speaking engagement was at a church function in July 1940, where he warned against authoritarianism and told the audience to "beware of those people who want to establish a new world order [...] the old things of the world today are the wisest and best things I know".

Cook died at his home in Bellevue Hill on 30 July 1947, after a heart-related illness of about three weeks. He was granted a state funeral, held at the Wesley Chapel on Castlereagh Street, and then cremated at the Northern Suburbs Crematorium. Pallbearers included Billy Hughes and Willie Kelly, the latter being the last surviving member of his ministry. Cook died at the age of 86, surpassing George Reid as Australia's longest-lived prime minister; his record was broken by Hughes a few years later. He was the oldest living prime minister for a record span of over 27 years, following the death of Edmund Barton in 1920.

== Honours ==
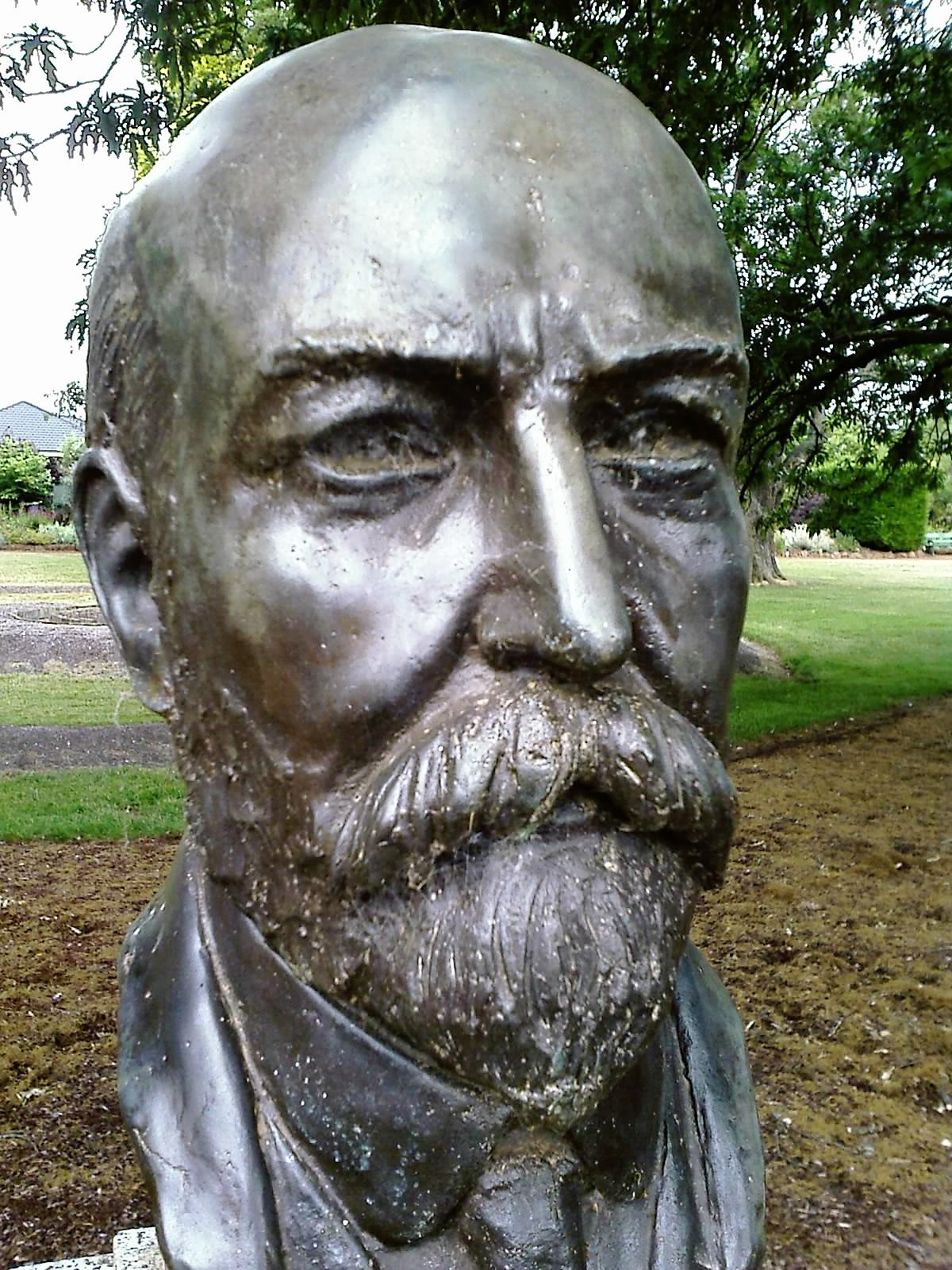
Bust of Joseph Cook by sculptor Wallace Anderson located in the Prime Ministers Avenue in the Ballarat Botanical Gardens

Cook was appointed to the Privy Council on 16 July 1914. He was knighted in 1918 as Knight Grand Cross of the Order of St Michael and St George (GCMG).

In 1972, he was honoured on a postage stamp bearing his portrait issued by Australia Post.

Until 2024, the federal seat of Cook was originally only named after Captain James Cook and not Joseph Cook. This meant that Joseph Cook was the only (eligible) Prime Minister who did not have a federal electorate named after him. In 2006, the Australian Electoral Commission's Redistribution Committee for New South Wales proposed that the division be jointly named for Joseph and James Cook, but this did not eventuate at the time. In 2024, the namesake was finally altered to be joint between both men, to give recognition to Joseph Cook and have a division named after him.

The suburb of Cook, located within the Belconnen district of Canberra, Australian Capital Territory is jointly named after Joseph and Captain James Cook.

== See also ==
- Cook Ministry

== Notes ==
New South Wales Legislative Assembly
Preceded by George Donald	Member for Hartley; 1891–1901	Succeeded by John Hurley
Political offices
Preceded by John Kidd	Postmaster-General of New South Wales; 1894–1898	Succeeded by Varney Parkes
Parliament of Australia
New division	Member for Parramatta; 1901–1921	Succeeded by Herbert Pratten
Party political offices
Preceded by Steering Committee of 5 elected in 1891	Leader of the Australian Labor Party in New South Wales; 1893–1894	Succeeded by James McGowen
Preceded by Dugald Thomson	Deputy Leader of the Anti-Socialist Party; 1905–1908	No successor elected
Preceded by George Reid	Leader of the Anti-Socialist Party; 1908–1909	Party disbanded
Preceded by Alfred Deakin	Leader of the Commonwealth Liberal Party; 1913–1916	Party disbanded
Political offices
Preceded by Dugald Thomson	Deputy Leader of the Opposition; 1905–1908	No successor elected
Preceded by George Reid	Leader of the Opposition; 1908–1909	Succeeded by Alfred Deakin
Preceded by George Pearce	Minister for Defence; 1909–1910	Succeeded by George Pearce
Preceded by Alfred Deakin	Leader of the Opposition; 1913	Succeeded by Andrew Fisher
Preceded by Andrew Fisher	Prime Minister of Australia; 1913–1914	Succeeded by Andrew Fisher
Preceded by King O'Malley	Minister for Home Affairs; 1913–1914	Succeeded by William Archibald
Preceded by Andrew Fisher	Leader of the Opposition; 1914–1917	Succeeded by Frank Tudor
Preceded by Jens Jensen	Minister for the Navy; 1917–1920	Succeeded by William Laird Smith
Preceded by William Watt	Treasurer of Australia; 1920–1921	Succeeded by Stanley Bruce
Diplomatic posts
Preceded by Andrew Fisher	Australian High Commissioner to the United Kingdom; 1921–1927	Succeeded by Sir Granville Ryrie
