= Permanent Mandates Commission =

League of Nations organisation

The Permanent Mandates Commission (PMC) was the commission of the League of Nations responsible for oversight of mandated territories. The commission was established on 1 December 1920 and was headquartered at Geneva.

The existence of the Commission was stipulated in Article 22 of the League of Nations Covenant: "A permanent Commission shall be constituted to receive and examine the annual reports of the Mandatories and to advise the Council on all matters relating to the observance of the mandates."

Even though the PMC was composed of members from imperial and foreign policy establishments, and the Commission introduced regular reporting and questioning procedures that placed mandate administrations under international review, it had no power to enforce its recommendations. The organization did act independently of states and established norms that constrained the behaviors of colonial powers. The PMC represented one of the first multilateral international mechanisms through which Britain and France were formally required to account for their colonial administration to an external body. The PMC played a key role in establishing that the mandates could not be annexed by the colonial powers. The PMC helped to establish that the mandates had a unique status under international law.

== Background ==
The PMC was established by the victors of World War I to oversee the former colonial possessions of the Ottoman Empire and German Empire. Britain and France sought to govern these territories as colonies, whereas U.S. president Woodrow Wilson opposed their manoeuvres. As a compromise, it was agreed that the former Ottoman and German colonial possessions would be administered as mandates by individual states whose administration would be subject to oversight by the PMC. The primary objective of the mandate system was to support the eventual independence of the mandated territories. Britain and France were tasked with guiding these territories towards self-governance and independence, with the expectation that they would be administered for the benefit of their inhabitants. The PMC was responsible for overseeing this process. However, due to the significant legislative influence exerted by Britain and France within the PMC, coupled with the commission’s lack of executive authority, these powers were able to govern their mandated territories in much the same way as their other colonies. While the PMC reviewed annual reports and questioned mandatory powers, it lacked enforcement mechanisms and could not compel compliance. As a result, oversight functioned mainly through reporting, debate, and public accountability rather than direct intervention.

== Composition ==
The Commission had 10 and later, 11 members (or twelve, if Sweden and Norway, which shared their seat, represented first by Anna Bugge-Wicksell and later by Valentine Dannevig, are counted separately). Four of these members were Mandatory Powers, 7 were independent powers and one seat was held by the International Labour Organisation (ILO). Members served without fixed term. William Rappard, Swiss lawyer and professor, served for the Commission's entire active life of 18 years as did Pierre Orts, Italian Marquis Alberto Theodoli, first chairman, for 16 years, the Spaniard M. Palacios for 15 years, Lord Lugard and Van Rees for 13 each while Valentine Dannevig from Norway and the Portuguese Count Jose de Penha Garcia served for 11 years each.

Upon joining the League of Nations in 1926, Germany immediately asked for a seat on the PMC but was initially rebuffed. The first German member of the PMC was Ludwig Kastl who joined the PMC in October 1927. Germany withdrew from the League in 1933, ending its membership of the PMC. Japan withdrew from the League in 1938, ending its membership on the PMC.

According to historian Susan Pedersen, the organization was "very much an imperialists' club," as five out of nine initial members were retired colonial governors, ministers or high officials. By the mid-1920s, the Commission "began to resemble a spa for retired African governors." Even though it was composed of individuals from imperial and foreign policy establishments, the organization did act independently. This was in part because of the lack of term limits (which led to camaraderie among members and the development of expertise), the authority derived from written texts (which allowed the members to perform impartiality), and the publication of the organization's deliberations. She argues that the Commission was at its most influential in 1932.

According to Pedersen, Commission members believed in a civilizing mission.

== Modus Operandi ==
The Commission met in sessions once or twice a year to consider annual reports from the mandates; within any session, any number of meetings could be held usually in private although any of these could be public. Extraordinary sessions could also be held in special circumstances. The Commission held its first session from 4 to 8 October 1921. At the first meeting, the members determined that they had the right to examine all aspects of administration in the mandated territories (not just those mandated in the Covenant), that a comprehensive list of questions should be asked of all mandate powers, and that mandate powers should send all relevant legislation that affects territories to the Commission.

The last meeting was held at the 37th final session from 12 to 21 December 1939.

== Mandates ==
The Commission oversaw three types of mandates.

=== Class A Mandates ===
- Palestine (United Kingdom),
- Mesopotamia (United Kingdom, but not enacted)
- Syria (France)

=== Class B Mandates ===
- Ruanda-Urundi (Belgium)
- Tanganyika (United Kingdom)
- French Cameroon (France)
- British Cameroon (United Kingdom)
- French Togoland (France)
- British Togoland (United Kingdom)

=== Class C Mandates ===
- New Guinea (Australia)
- Nauru (Australia / New Zealand / United Kingdom)
- Western Samoa (New Zealand)
- South Seas Mandate (Japan)
- South West Africa (South Africa)
