= Jim Robson (politician) =

Australian politician (1895–1975)

James Hutchins Robson M.M. (23 September 1895 – 3 December 1975) was an Australian politician. He was the Labor member for Hartley in the New South Wales Legislative Assembly from 1956 to 1965.

Robson was born in Newcastle upon Tyne in England to George Robson, a drayman, and Jane Ann Mackay. He began working in the mines in 1909 and enlisted in the 9th Northumberland Fusiliers in 1914 and become a battalion runner and dispatch carrier. During the Capture of Fricourt in July 1916 he was injured when a German shell burst shrapnel into his legs. Upon recovery, he returned to the Western Front with the 11th Northumberland Fusiliers. During the Battle of Passchendaele, Robson was awarded the Military Medal for bravery.

In 1927 he and his family migrated to Australia, settling in Lithgow where Robson continued to work as a miner. He joined the Australian Labor Party in 1927 and was president of the federal electorate council for Macquarie, directing Ben Chifley's local campaigns. He was also vice-president of the Federated Ironworkers' Association, and was a member of Lithgow Council from 1947 to 1956.

In 1956, Robson was selected as the Labor candidate for the state seat of Hartley; the sitting Independent Labor MP Jim Chalmers was contesting Nepean. Robson won the seat by 132 votes against Independent Labor candidate William Black. In 1962 he held on only narrowly against Independent Harold Coates. He retired in 1965 and his son, James Malone Robson, contested the seat against Coates, who won by 503 votes. Robson died in 1975 in Lithgow.

New South Wales Legislative Assembly
Preceded by Jim Chalmers	Member for Hartley; 1956–1965	Succeeded by Harold Coates
