= Thomas Brown (New South Wales colonial politician) =

Australian politician

Thomas Brown (1 December 1811 – 11 December 1889) was a Scottish-born Australian politician.

He was born at Craighead, the son of David Brown. Around 1838 he married Mary Maxwell; they had no children.

He migrated to Australia around 1839 and managed a flourmill for Andrew Brown at Cooerwull near Lithgow, New South Wales. The two men were unrelated although both were Scottish Presbyterian farmers. In 1840 Thomas Brown purchased 210 acres (85 hectares) adjoining Cooerwull. Over the next few years he added considerably to his holdings, circumventing the Lands Act 1861 (NSW). This he did through the use of a 'dummy', or proxy, a local carpenter named Robert Pitt. Brown named his lands the 'Esk Bank Estate' after a village on the River Esk, near his birthplace. and was on both sides of the Bells Line of Road. In 1841 he built Eskbank House.

In 1849 Brown was appointed a magistrate, resigning in 1872. Coal from the property was used to generate steam to power a flourmill, however there was no suitable transport to allow the coal to be sold elsewhere. This changed in 1869 when the Great Western railway line was built through his property.

Brown was elected to the New South Wales Legislative Assembly for Hartley at the 1872 election, and was re-elected at the 1874 election. In October 1875 Thomas Brown responded to a tender for the supply of coal to the railway, however no contract was awarded. In December 1875 a fresh tender was called and William Pitt personally submitted a tender which was accepted. Samuel Gray said in the Legislative Assembly that Thomas Brown leased the colliery to William Pitt and that the only connection between them was one of landlord and tenant.

The Committee found that Thomas Brown was the owner of the Eskbank Colliery, the coal supplied by William Pitt was taken from the Eskbank Colliery and that Thomas Brown had a "direct interest in a contract entered into with the Government by the said William Pitt for the supply of engine coal for the Great Southern and Western Railways" and was therefore disqualified from being a member of the Legislative Assembly.

After the Committee report was tabled Thomas Brown attempted to resign, however the Legislative Assembly adopted the report of the Committee and declared the seat was vacant.

Brown died at St Leonards on 1 December 1889 (aged 78).

New South Wales Legislative Assembly
Preceded by James Neale	Member for Hartley; 1872–1876	Succeeded by John Hurley
