= Walter Targett =

Australian politician (1849–1918)

Walter Scott Targett (1849 – 9 September 1918) was an English-born Australian politician.

He was born in London to farmer David Targett and Eliza Giles. He migrated to New Zealand around 1854, then moved to Victoria around 1856, to Tasmania around 1862 and to New South Wales around 1864. On 16 September 1875 he married Emily Chapman, with whom he had ten children. He worked as a newspaper proprietor and farmer before entering politics. In 1882 he was elected to the New South Wales Legislative Assembly for Hartley, serving until his defeat in 1887. Targett died at Kogarah in 1918.

New South Wales Legislative Assembly
Preceded by Robert Abbott	Member for Hartley; 1882–1887	Succeeded by John Hurley
