= Harold Coates =

Australian politician (1917–2002)

Harold Coates MP OBE

Member of the New South Wales Parliament for Hartley
- In office 1 May 1965 – 23 January 1968
- Preceded by: Jim Robson
- Succeeded by: Abolished

Member of the New South Wales Parliament for Blue Mountains
- In office 24 February 1968 – 2 April 1976
- Preceded by: New division
- Succeeded by: Mick Clough

Personal details
- Born: 22 April 1917 Hampton, New South Wales, Australia
- Died: 9 April 2002 (aged 84) Lithgow, New South Wales, Australia
- Party: Independent
- Spouse: Kathleen
- Children: 4
- Occupation: Builder

Harold George Coates, OBE (22 April 1917 – 9 April 2002) was an Australian politician who served as a member of the New South Wales Legislative Assembly from 1965–1976.

== Political career ==
Coates entered public office as an alderman on the Lithgow City Council in 1945, where he served for almost forty years. Coates was Mayor of Lithgow, New South Wales in 1947, from 1954 until 1957 and again in 1976.

Coates first contested the seat of Hartley at the 1947 election as a Liberal candidate. He again contested Hartley in 1962 as an independent, and came close to defeating Labor member Jim Robson in what had been a traditionally Labor seat. In 1965, Coates ran as an independent again and won the election on Democratic Labor Party preferences. With no party winning an outright majority, Coates threw his support to the Liberal-National Coalition–a critical step in allowing the conservatives to form a minority government, ending 24 years in opposition.

Coates held the seat, renamed Blue Mountains in 1966, until he was swept out in the 1978 "Wranslide" by Labor's Mick Clough, his opponent in 1976. During elections between 1962 and 1978, the Liberals did not nominate a candidate against Coates. He was viewed as a conservative independent and generally supported the Coalition in parliament.

== Personal life ==
Coates was born to George Coates and Emily Ivy Coates (née Moore) in Hampton, New South Wales on 22 April 1917.

Coates attended school Lithgow High School and Lithgow Technical College. He was a builder by trade, and he went on to succeed his father in running the family business, G.Coates and Sons Pty Ltd, a hardware store and timber yard in Lithgow.

In 1939 Coates married Kathleen Winchester and they had four children.

He was a long-standing Freemason, and served as Grand Master of the United Grand Lodge of New South Wales and the Australian Capital Territory from 1980 to 1985.

New South Wales Legislative Assembly
Preceded by Jim Robson	Member for Hartley; 1965 – 1968	Succeeded by Abolished
Preceded by New division	Member for Blue Mountains; 1968 – 1976	Succeeded by Mick Clough
