= Jim Chalmers (New South Wales politician) =

Australian politician (1901–1986)

Personal details
- Born: 28 January 1901 Lanarkshire, Scotland
- Died: 11 November 1986 (aged 85) Epping, New South Wales
- Party: Labor Party, Independent Labor

James Chalmers (28 January 1901 – 11 November 1986) was an Australian politician. He was a member of the New South Wales Legislative Assembly from 1947 until 1956. He was a member of the Labor Party (ALP) until he resigned from the party in 1952 and then sat as an independent Labor member.

Chalmers was born in Lanarkshire, Scotland. He was the son of a coal miner and migrated to Australia with his family at the age of seven. He was educated to elementary level and began work as a coal miner in the Hunter Region when he was 14. He moved to Lithgow in 1916. Chalmers supported Ben Chifley in the 1920s and 1930s and remained loyal to the Federal Executive of the ALP during the party divisions in those years (see Lang Labor). He left the mining industry in 1943 and worked as an employment officer with the Federal Department of Labour and Industry. In 1947, Chalmers was elected to the New South Wales Parliament as the Labor member for Hartley at the by-election caused by the resignation of the sitting member Hamilton Knight who accepted a position with the Commonwealth Industrial Commission. Prior to the 1953 state election he resigned from the Labor Party claiming that there was a conspiracy within the party to deny him pre-selection. He subsequently won the election as an independent Labor candidate. He retained the seat until 1956 when he unsuccessfully contested the seat of Nepean at that year's election. He did not hold ministerial or party office.

New South Wales Legislative Assembly
Preceded by Hamilton Knight	Member for Hartley; 1947–1956	Succeeded by Jim Robson
