= Electoral district of Hartley (New South Wales) =

Former state electoral district of New South Wales, Australia

Hartley was an electoral district of the Legislative Assembly in the Australian state of New South Wales, created in 1859 in the Lithgow area and named after the town of Hartley, near Lithgow. It replaced part of Cook and Westmoreland. From 1891 to 1894, it elected two members. In 1920, with the introduction of proportional representation, it was absorbed into Bathurst, along with Orange. It was recreated in 1927 and abolished in 1968 and partly replaced by Blue Mountains.

== Members for Hartley ==
Single-member (1859–1891)
Member	Party	Term			
Henry Rotton	None	1859–1864			
John Lucas	None	1864–1869			
James Neale	None	1869–1872			
Thomas Brown	None	1872–1876			
John Hurley	None	1876–1880			
Robert Abbott	None	1880–1882			
Walter Targett	None	1882–1887			
John Hurley	Free Trade	1887–1891			
Two members (1891–1894)
Member	Party	Term	Member	Party	Term
Joseph Cook	Labour	1891–1894	George Donald	Free Trade	1891–1894
Single-member (1894–1920)
Member	Party	Term			
Joseph Cook	Independent Labour	1894–1894			
Joseph Cook	Free Trade	1894–1901			
John Hurley	Independent	1901–1904			
John Hurley	Liberal Reform	1904–1907			
James Dooley	Labor	1907–1920			
Single-member (1927–1968)
Member	Party	Term			
Hamilton Knight	Labor	1927–1947			
Jim Chalmers	Labor	1947–1953			
Jim Chalmers	Independent Labor	1953–1956			
Jim Robson	Labor	1956–1965			
Harold Coates	Independent	1965–1968			

== Election results ==
1965 New South Wales state election: Hartley
Party	Candidate	Votes	%	±%
Labor	Jim Robson	8,228	47.4	−1.5
Independent	Harold Coates	7,984	46.0	−1.5
Democratic Labor	Laurence Breen	1,151	6.6	+6.6
Total formal votes		17,363	98.7	0.0
Informal votes		224	1.3	0.0
Turnout		17,587	95.8	−0.2
Two-candidate-preferred result
Independent	Harold Coates	8,933	51.4	+2.1
Labor	Jim Robson	8,430	48.6	−2.1
Independent gain from Labor		Swing	+2.1	
