= John Hurley (New South Wales politician, born 1844) =

Australian politician

John Hurley JP
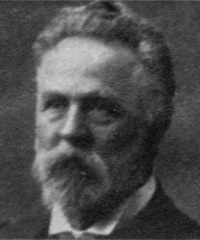

Member of the New South Wales Legislative Assembly for Central Cumberland
- In office 22 February 1872 – 28 November 1874
- Preceded by: Edward Flood
- Succeeded by: Joseph Wearne

Member of the New South Wales Legislative Assembly for Hartley
- In office 21 April 1876 – 9 April 1880
- Preceded by: Thomas Brown
- Succeeded by: Robert Abbott
- In office 12 February 1887 – 6 June 1891
- Preceded by: Walter Targett
- Succeeded by: Seat abolished
- In office 3 July 1901 – 19 August 1907
- Preceded by: Joseph Cook
- Succeeded by: James Dooley

Member of the Queensland Legislative Assembly for Maryborough
- In office 17 August 1883 – 8 July 1884 Serving with Richard Sheridan
- Preceded by: Henry Palmer
- Succeeded by: John Annear

Personal details
- Born: John Hurley; 2 June 1844 Sydney, New South Wales, Australia
- Died: 10 December 1911 (aged 67) Sydney, New South Wales, Australia
- Resting place: Rookwood Cemetery
- Party: Liberal Reform
- Other political affiliations: Free Trade, Independent
- Spouse(s): Elizabeth Ann Letcher (m.1867 d.1887), Emma Wilson (m.1891 d.1896), Annie Elizabeth Garling (m.1905 d.1942)
- Occupation: Gold miner, Coal mine owner

John Hurley (2 June 1844 – 10 December 1911) was a politician in colonial Australia, a member at different times of the New South Wales Legislative Assembly and the Queensland Legislative Assembly.

Harley was born in Sydney, the son of Farrell Hurley and Catherine (née Critchley)

Hurley was member of the New South Wales Legislative Assembly for Central Cumberland 22 February 1872 to 28 November 1874; for Hartley 21 April 1876 to 9 November 1880, 12 February 1887 to 6 June 1891 and 3 July 1901 to 19 August 1907. He did not hold caucus, parliamentary or ministerial office.

Hurley was also member of the Queensland Legislative Assembly for Maryborough 17 August 1883 to 8 July 1884.

His brother William was also a member of the NSW parliament, as member for Macquarie (1895–1904) and the Legislative Council (1904–1924).

Hurley died on 10 December 1911 (aged 67).

New South Wales Legislative Assembly
Preceded by Edward Flood	Member for Central Cumberland; 1872–1874	Succeeded by Joseph Wearne
Preceded by Thomas Brown	Member for Hartley; 1876–1880	Succeeded by Robert Abbott
Parliament of Queensland
Preceded by Henry Palmer	Member for Maryborough; 1883–1884; Served alongside: Richard Sheridan	Succeeded by John Annear
New South Wales Legislative Assembly
Preceded by Walter Targett	Member for Hartley; 1887–1891	Succeeded by Joseph Cook; George Donald
Preceded by Joseph Cook	Member for Hartley; 1901–1907	Succeeded by James Dooley
