= City Ring Route =

Ring road in Adelaide, Australia

City Ring Road South Australia

General information
- Type: Road
- Length: 16.9 km (11 mi)
- Route number(s): R1 (2017–present)
- Former route number: A21 (1998–2017) (Thebarton–Wayville)
- Ring road around: Adelaide city centre; North Adelaide

Major junctions
- From: Main North Road; Medindie, Adelaide
- Northcote Terrace; North Terrace; Fullarton Road; Anzac Highway; Sir Donald Bradman Drive; Port Road; Torrens Road
- To: Main North Road; Medindie, Adelaide

Location(s)
- Region: Western Adelaide, Eastern Adelaide
- Major suburbs: Gilberton, Kent Town, Dulwich, Parkside, Wayville, Bowden, Richmond, Thebarton

Adelaide has two city ring routes, which loop around the Adelaide city centre and North Adelaide and are known as the Inner and Outer Ring Routes.

== Inner ring route ==
The Inner Ring Route is a collection of major roads signposted as state route R1 (was A21 before 2017). Listed clockwise from Main North Road, the inner route consists of:

- Robe Terrace
- Park Road (southbound)/Mann Road (northbound)
- Hackney Road
- Dequetteville Terrace
- Britannia Roundabout
- Fullarton Road
- Greenhill Road
- Richmond Road
- South Road
- James Congdon Drive
- Port Road
- Park Terrace
- Fitzroy Terrace

The Inner Ring Route is adjacent to the outer edge of the Adelaide Park Lands except on the western side between Anzac Highway and Port Road, where railway lines occupy the space along the parklands, and the road ring route is further out. The earlier A21 route using West Terrace passed inside the ring of parklands instead.

=== History ===
Prior to the renumbering as route R1 in 2017, the western side of the previous route A21 was different from the current route. It followed moore of Port Road southeast, West Terrace and Goodwood Road. Route R1 uses James Congdon Drive, a short section of South Road and Richmond Road instead.

The Park Terrace section had a level crossing of the Outer Harbor railway line until 2017. The crossing was replaced by a bridge when the railway was lowered as part of a project to separate the Torrens Junction so that suburban trains to Outer Harbor did not conflict with interstate trains on the standard gauge line.

The Park Terrace bridge over the Gawler railway line and interstate freight line was constructed in 1990. When it was built, it replaced an awkward 30-degree level crossing. In 2017, it was named after the engineer who supervised its construction, David Fitzsimons.

=== Route description ===
LGA	Location	km	mi	Destinations	Notes
Adelaide–Prospect–Walkerville tripoint	North Adelaide–Thorngate–Medindie tripoint	0.0	0.0	Main North Road (A1 north, unallocated south) – Gepps Cross, Port Wakefield, Gawler	Northernmost point of Ring Road and route R1; Name change: Fitzroy Terrace (west), Robe Terrace (east)
Adelaide–Walkerville boundary	North Adelaide–Medindie–Gilberton tripoint	1.2	0.75	Northcote Terrace (A10 north) – Houghton, Birdwood, Angaston; Walkerville Terrace (northeast) – Walkerville	Name change: Robe Terrace (west), Mann Road (n/bound)/Park Road (n/bound) (south)
Adelaide–Walkerville boundary	North Adelaide–Medindie–Gilberton tripoint	1.5	0.93	Melbourne Street – North Adelaide	No right turn into Park Road southbound
Adelaide–Walkerville boundary	North Adelaide–Medindie–Gilberton tripoint	1.7	1.1	O-Bahn Busway	Buses only
Adelaide–Walkerville boundary	North Adelaide–Medindie–Gilberton tripoint	2.0	1.2	Bundeys Road – North Adelaide	Name change: Mann Road (n/bound)/Park Road (n/bound) (north), Hackney Road (south)
River Torrens		2.2	1.4	Hackney Bridge	
Adelaide–Norwood Payneham & St Peters boundary	Adelaide–Hackney–Kent Town tripoint	3.3	2.1	North Terrace (A11 east) – Campbelltown, Hope Valley, Houghton; Botanic Road (west) – Adelaide CBD	Name change: Hackney Road (north), Dequetteville Terrace (south)
Adelaide–Norwood Payneham & St Peters–Burnside tripoint	Adelaide–Kent Town–Rose Park	4.6	2.9	Fullarton Road (north) – Norwood; Wakefield Road (west) – Adelaide CBD; Kensington Road (east) – Wattle Park	Britannia Roundabout; Name change: Dequetteville Terrace (northwest), Fullarton Road (south)
Adelaide–Burnside boundary	Adelaide–Dulwich–Glenside–Eastwood quadripoint	5.9	3.7	Greenhill Road (B26 east) – Burnside, Uraidla, Balhannah; Fullarton Road (A1 south) – Glen Osmond, Fullarton, Belair	Name change: Fullarton Road (north), Greenhill Road (west)
Adelaide–Unley–Burnside tripoint	Adelaide–Parkside–Eastwood tripoint	2.9	1.8	Glen Osmond Road – Adelaide CBD, Glen Osmond	
Adelaide–Unley boundary	Adelaide–Parkside boundary	2.7	1.7	Hutt Road (north) – Adelaide CBD; George Street (south) – Parkside	
Adelaide–Unley boundary	Adelaide–Unley–Parkside tripoint	2.1	1.3	Unley Road (B29 south, unallocated north) – Adelaide CBD, Belair	
Adelaide–Unley boundary	Adelaide–Unley boundary	8.1	5.0	Peacock Road (north) – Adelaide CBD; King William Road (south) – Unley Park	
Adelaide–Unley boundary	Adelaide–Wayville–Unley tripoint	8.2	5.1	Glenelg tram line	
Adelaide–Unley boundary	Adelaide–Wayville boundary	8.7	5.4	Sir Lewis Cohen Avenue – Adelaide CBD	
Adelaide–Unley boundary	Adelaide–Wayville boundary	9.2	5.7	Goodwood Road – Adelaide CBD, Hindmarsh	
Adelaide–Unley–West Torrens tripoint	Adelaide–Wayville–Keswick–Keswick Terminal quadripoint	9.7	6.0	Belair, Seaford and Adelaide–Melbourne SG railway lines	
Adelaide–Unley–West Torrens tripoint	Adelaide–Wayville–Keswick–Keswick Terminal quadripoint	9.7	6.0	Anzac Highway (A5 southwest, unallocated northeast) – Adelaide CBD, Glenelg	Name change: Greenhill Road (east), Richmond Road (west)
West Torrens	Keswick–Marleston–Richmond–Mile End South quadripoint	10.8	6.7	South Road (A2 south) – Edwardstown, Darlington, Old Noarlunga	Concurrency with route A2
West Torrens	Richmond–Mile End South boundary	11.3	7.0	South Road (A2 north) – Wingfield, Hindmarsh, Gawler	Concurrency with route A2
West Torrens	Mile End South–Keswick Terminal–Mile End tripoint	12.1	7.5	Sir Donald Bradman Drive (A6 west, unallocated east) – Adelaide CBD, Adelaide Airport, West Beach	
Adelaide–West Torrens boundary	Adelaide–Mile End boundary	13.1	8.1	Henley Beach Road (west) – Mile End, Fulham, Henley Beach	Half-diamond interchange, no access eastbound
Adelaide–West Torrens boundary	Adelaide–Thebarton boundary	13.6	8.5	Port Road (southeast) – Adelaide CBD	Name change: James Congdon Drive (south), Port Road (north)
River Torrens		14.7	9.1	Hindmarsh Bridge	
Adelaide–Charles Sturt boundary	North Adelaide–Hindmarsh boundary	14.8	9.2	Port Road (A7 northwest) – Woodville, Port Adelaide	Name change: Port Road (south), Park Terrace (northeast)
Adelaide–Charles Sturt boundary	North Adelaide–Hindmarsh–Bowden tripoint	14.9	9.3	Outer Harbor and Grange railway lines	
Adelaide–Charles Sturt boundary	North Adelaide–Bowden–Ovingham tripoint	15.5	9.6	Gawler and Adelaide–Port Augusta SG railway lines	
Adelaide–Charles Sturt–Prospect tripoint	North Adelaide–Ovingham–Fitzroy tripoint	16.3	10.1	Torrens Road (A22) – Rosewater, Kilburn	Name change: Park Terrace (southwest), Fitzroy Terrace (east)
Adelaide–Prospect boundary	North Adelaide–Fitzroy–Thorngate tripoint	16.8	10.4	Prospect Road – Prospect, Gepps Cross	
Adelaide–Prospect–Walkerville boundary	North Adelaide–Thorngate–Medindie tripoint	17.1	10.6	Main North Road (A1 north, unallocated south) – Gepps Cross, Port Wakefield, Gawler	Northernmost point of Ring Road and route R1; Name change: Fitzroy Terrace (west), Robe Terrace (east)
1.000 mi = 1.609 km; 1.000 km = 0.621 mi: Concurrency terminus; Incomplete access; Route transition

== Outer ring route ==
The Outer Ring Route is not signposted. It also consists of major roads surrounding the city:

- Grand Junction Road
- Hampstead Road/Portrush Road
- Cross Road
- South Road
