= Medindie Gardens, South Australia =

Medindie Gardens
- Suburb
- Interactive map of Medindie Gardens
- Coordinates: 34°53′31″S 138°36′22″E
- Country: Australia
- State: South Australia
- City: Adelaide
- LGA: City of Prospect

Government
  - State electorate: Adelaide
  - Federal division: Adelaide

Area
  - Total: 0.14 km^{2} (0.054 sq mi)

Population
  - Total: 352 (SAL 2021)
- Postcode: 5081
Suburbs around Medindie Gardens
Prospect	Nailsworth	Collinswood
Prospect	Medindie Gardens	Walkerville
Thorngate	Medindie	Gilberton

Medindie Gardens is a suburb of Adelaide, South Australia, in the City of Prospect. It is located 4 kilometres north of the central business district, along the eastern side of Main North Road. It is one of the smallest suburbs in Adelaide and has only six streets within its boundaries: Charlbury Road, Corbin Road, Derlanger Avenue, Main North Road, Nottage Terrace and Sherbourne Road.

The northern boundary of Medindie Gardens is along the southern boundary of the North Road Cemetery, which is in the suburb of Nailsworth, and has the graves of some very prominent South Australians.
