= Medindee =

Medindee may refer to:

- Menindee, New South Wales
- Medindie, South Australia
