= Albert Ambler =

Australian cricketer (1892–1970)

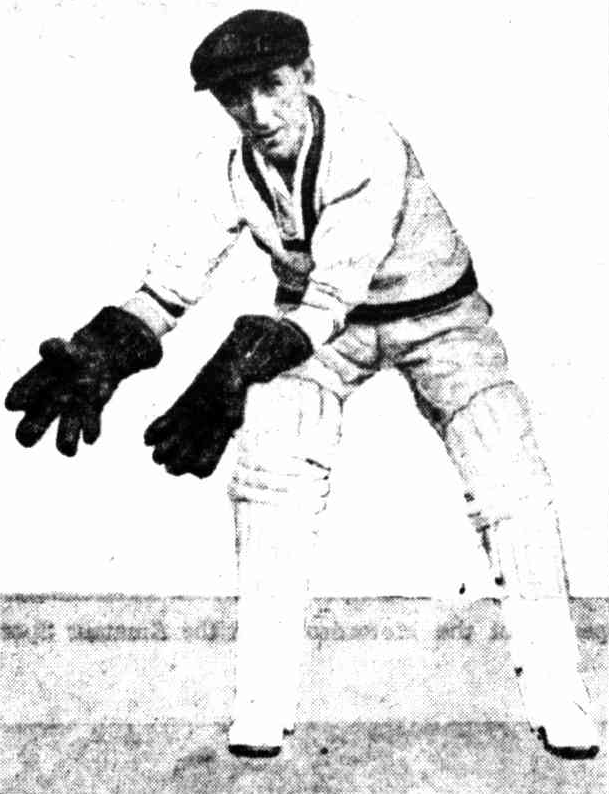
- Ambler in 1924

Personal information
- Full name: Albert Mark Ambler
- Born: 27 September 1892; Murray Bridge, South Australia
- Died: 27 November 1970 (aged 78); Prospect, South Australia
- Batting: Right-handed
- Role: Wicket-keeper

Domestic team information
- Years: Team
- 1920/21–1925/26: South Australia

Career statistics
Competition	First-class
Matches	22
Runs scored	283
Batting average	10.48
100s/50s	0/0
Top score	41
Catches/stumpings	28/28
- Source: ESPNcricinfo, 24 July 2019

Albert Mark Ambler (27 September 1892 – 27 November 1970) was an Australian cricketer. A wicket-keeper, he played twenty-two first-class matches for South Australia between 1920 and 1926.
