= Britannia Roundabout =

Roundabout, Adelaide, South Australia

Location
- Adelaide, South Australia
- Coordinates: 34°55′40″S 138°37′24″E
- Roads at junction: Fullarton Road (to the north) – Payneham; Kensington Road (to the east); Fullarton Road R1 – Eastwood, Murray Bridge; Wakefield Road – City Centre; Dequetteville Terrace R1 – Medindie

Construction
- Type: Double Roundabout (since 2014), previously one large roundabout
- Lanes: 3

The Britannia Roundabout is a roundabout intersection on the eastern side of the City Ring Route near the city centre of Adelaide, and is named for the Britannia Hotel, adjacent. Before it was upgraded in 2014 it was regarded as a traffic black spot, many minor collisions having occurred there.

The five roads which join the intersection are (in clockwise order) Fullarton Road (to the north), Kensington Road to the east, Fullarton Road (to the south), Wakefield Road (to the west) and Dequetteville Terrace (to the northwest). All five roads are two lanes incoming.

Drivers travelling in a south easterly direction on Dequetteville Terrace faced difficulty at the intersection because Wakefield Road traffic came from well over their right shoulder. The angle is less than 45 degrees.

The north western intersection of the roundabout was used as a hairpin corner on the Adelaide Street Circuit, the temporary motor racing track and for a long time was named Foster's Corner. The intersection takes its name from the Britannia Hotel, a pub located on the corner of Fullarton and Kensington Roads.

There had been persistent calls for the intersection to be replaced or improved over many years. In June 2013, the State Government proposed a safer re-design of the roundabout, splitting it into two smaller roundabouts. The project cost was estimated at $3.2 million, and involved the removal of a small number of trees from the nearby parkland. In April 2014, the new and upgraded Britannia Roundabouts came into operation.
