= William Shierlaw =

Australian draper and municipal leader

- Shierlaw in a 1904 caricature by John Henry Chinner
- Born: c. 1839; Airdrie, Scotland
- Died: 25 August 1920; Parkside, South Australia
- Occupations: Draper, property developer
- Known for: Co-founding G. & W. Shierlaw (later Shierlaw & Co.)
- Office: Mayor of Unley (1888–1889); Unley councillor (1875–1878)
- Board member of: Adelaide, Unley and Mitcham Tramway Company (Chairman); Adelaide and Suburban Tramway Company (Director)

William Shierlaw (c. 1839 – 25 August 1920) was a Scottish-born Australian draper, property developer and local politician who served as mayor of Unley, South Australia, from 1888 to 1889. He and his brother George founded the Adelaide drapery firm G. & W. Shierlaw, later known as Shierlaw & Co. He developed residential subdivisions in Malvern and the area originally named Chicago (now Kilburn), and was a substantial benefactor of the Methodist Church, establishing a £10,000 trust in 1908 to support ministerial education.

== Biography ==
=== Early life ===
Shierlaw was born around 1839 in Airdrie, Lanarkshire, Scotland, the son of George Shierlaw, a clothier. He emigrated to South Australia in 1858. His father died in Adelaide the following year.

=== Business ===
Shierlaw co-founded the drapery business G. & W. Shierlaw with his brother George in 1860. In September 1860, the brothers advertised the opening of a tailoring and outfitting establishment at 31 Hindley Street, selling ready-made clothing and offering tailoring under George's supervision. Upon George's death in 1890, the name of the business was changed to Shierlaw & Co. By 1897, the firm operated from 16 Hindley Street, offering tailoring, clothing, hats and shirts. It imported textiles directly from woollen mills in Great Britain and continental Europe, while also selling clothing manufactured in South Australia. He retired in 1906 and his son S. B. Shierlaw succeeded him as head of the firm. William's younger brother Joseph Craig Shierlaw (1852–1925) also joined the family business after studying tailoring in London. He became a partner following George's retirement and continued his involvement in the firm after William retired.

He also served as chairman of the Adelaide, Unley and Mitcham Tramway Company. In addition, he was a director of the Adelaide and Suburban Tramway Company and of insurance companies.

=== Public life ===
Shierlaw served on the Unley council from 1875 to 1878 and was mayor from 1888 to 1889. On 6 June 1877, Shierlaw joined a deputation to Chief Secretary Sir Henry Ayers seeking the removal of the rifle butts from Adelaide's South Park Lands because of the danger to passing members of the public. He described an occasion when a bullet passed nearby after the range attendant had told him it was safe to proceed. In October 1885, Shierlaw agreed to stand for mayor of Unley after a deputation of ratepayers presented him with a requisition bearing 100 signatures.

He and Thomas Matters laid out the Malvern Extension in 1884 and South Malvern in 1886. Shierlaw also donated the land for the Malvern Wesleyan Methodist Church (now Malvern Uniting Church), built in 1891 at 44 Marlborough Street, Malvern.

Shierlaw was a substantial benefactor of the Methodist Church. He contributed to the reduction of church debts in Glenelg, Unley and Parkside, including a donation of £333 6s. 8d. towards a £1,000 debt owed by Parkside Church. In 1908, he established a £10,000 trust in government securities for the South Australian Methodist Conference. The income was to be paid to Shierlaw and his wife during their lifetimes, after which it would support the education and training of candidates for the Methodist ministry.

Shierlaw applied the name Chicago to a subdivision of the Hundred of Yatala in 1893. The suburb was renamed Kilburn in 1930.

=== Personal life ===
Shierlaw owned a residence known as Clivedon on Moseley Street in Glenelg. The house was demolished in the 1970s; a coach house on College Street had formed part of the property.

In 1894, Shierlaw undertook an eight-month journey with one of his sons, travelling through North America and Europe. His travels included a visit to Chicago, Illinois, where he toured Armour's meat-processing works. Following his return, he spoke about his travels in an interview with The Advertiser, expressing particular interest in Californian fruit cultivation and American agricultural practices.

Shierlaw's son William Stevenson Shierlaw (c. 1863–1913) conducted business independently in New South Wales, New Zealand and Western Australia before joining the family firm, Shierlaw & Co., in Adelaide approximately a year before his death. In October 1895, Shierlaw and his son Samuel Barr were interviewed at their Glenelg residence following reports that the premises of a business operated by William Stevenson in Coolgardie, Western Australia, had been destroyed by fire. William Stevenson was the sole proprietor of the Coolgardie business, which also traded as Shierlaw & Co.

=== Death ===
Shierlaw died suddenly of heart failure at his home in Parkside, South Australia, on 25 August 1920.
