= Fitzroy, South Australia =

Fitzroy
- Suburb
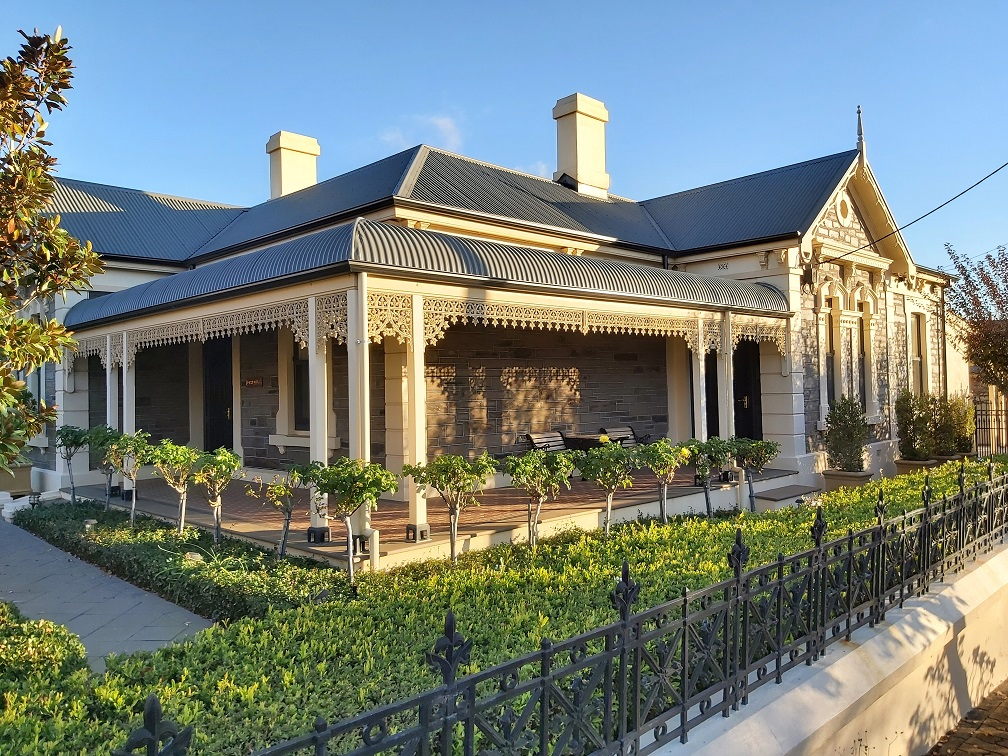
- A bluestone villa, typical of the character homes located in Fitzroy

- Interactive map of Fitzroy
- Coordinates: 34.89682975583725°S 138.59034825211359°E
- Country: Australia
- State: South Australia
- City: Adelaide
- LGA: City of Prospect
- Location: 4 km (2.5 mi) north of Adelaide city centre

Government
  - State electorate: Adelaide
  - Federal division: Adelaide

Area
  - Total: 28.9 km^{2} (11.2 sq mi)

Population
  - Total: 783 (SAL 2021)
- Postcode: 5082
Suburbs around Fitzroy
Renown Park	Prospect	Prospect
Ovingham	Fitzroy	Thorngate
Ovingham	Adelaide Park Lands	Adelaide Park Lands

Fitzroy is an inner northern suburb of Adelaide 4 km (2.5 mi) from the Adelaide city centre, in the state of South Australia, within the City of Prospect. It ranks among the most expensive suburban areas in South Australia. It is adjacent to Prospect, Ovingham, Thorngate and, across the Adelaide Park Lands, North Adelaide.

== Location ==
Fitzroy is bounded on the west by Cotton Street, on the south by Fitzroy Terrace, on the east by Prospect Road and on the north by Whinham and Halstead streets. Fitzroy is essentially a residential suburb, overlooking the northern Adelaide parklands. The suburb is characterized by a diverse range of architectural styles, from beautifully preserved Victorian and Edwardian homes to sleek contemporary homes.

== Features ==
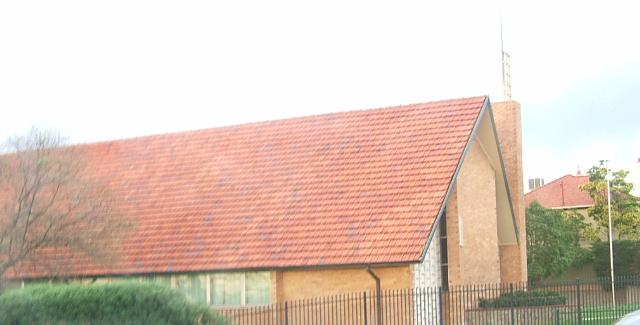
Mormon meetinghouse in Fitzroy

Aside from a Mormon meetinghouse overlooking Torrens Road, there are no non-residential facilities within the bounds of Fitzroy. The closest schools are in the northerly-adjacent and much larger Prospect.

== Transport ==
The main north–south arterial traffic routes of Churchill Road and Prospect Road pass to the west and east of Fitzroy, and the City Ring Route passes along the southern edge of the suburb. Prospect Road is served by the G10 bus service and Churchill Road by the 235 bus service. The Ovingham railway station to the west is within easy walking distance of all parts of Fitzroy.
