= Prescott Schools =

Location
- Prospect, Adelaide, South Australia; Australia
- Coordinates: 34°53′32″S 138°35′49″E

Information
- Type: Independent co-educational primary and secondary day school
- Motto: Latin: Nihil Sine Deo (Nothing Without God)
- Religious affiliation: Australian Union Conference of Seventh-day Adventists
- Denomination: Seventh-day Adventist
- Established: 1906; 120 years ago
- Principal: Jane Talamaivao
- Chaplain: Mal Naseli & Pr Tim Ah Sam
- Enrolment: 220 (2020)
- Campus: Prospect: Prescott College Secondary College; Morphett Vale: Prescott College Southern; Para Vista: Prescott Primary Northern
- Campus type: Suburban
- Colours: Red, blue and white
- Website: www.prescott.sa.edu.au

The Prescott Schools are a collection of independent Seventh-day Adventist co-educational primary and secondary day schools located in various suburbs in Adelaide, South Australia, Australia.

Prescott Secondary College is a secondary school with year levels beginning from Year 7 through to Year 12 and is located in the Adelaide suburb of Prospect. Prescott College Southern is a primary and secondary school catering for the southern Adelaide suburbs and is located in Morphett Vale. Prescott Primary Northern is located in Para Vista and caters for students from R to Year 6. The schools are connected with other Seventh-day Adventist schools throughout the Oceania region. It is part of the Seventh-day Adventist Church's worldwide educational system, the world's second-largest Christian school system.

== Prescott Secondary College ==
Prescott Secondary College is located in Prospect. The college is near St Helen's Park and is 1 block from Blackfriars Priory School. The school has two main mottos, "Nothing Without God" and the other "Because Your Child Matters". "Nothing Without God" was originally "Nothing Without Labour" but was changed in 2005 to recognise God as being more important than work.

Transport is also provided for students living either to the south or north by a school bus run service. There is also a vegetarian canteen in the school that offers a wide range of fine vegetarian cuisine which comply with Seventh-day Adventist dietary standards.

== History ==
- In 1906, the school opened with only 1 class room that was attached to the back of the Prospect Seventh-day Adventist church. Only 15 students attended the school when it first opened.
- In 1917, the school was shut down and was re-opened in May 1920.
- In 1936, the school was transferred to its present location in Koonga Avenue, Prospect.
- From 1936–1973, the school functioned as a primary and secondary school, plans for a high school were temporarily suspended due to the events of World War II.
- In 1952, the primary year levels were divided into two schools. The schools lie north and south of Adelaide.
- From 1952–1976, the school expanded and reached a 100 student mark. The school purchased more land and expanded the school even more with 6 new rooms.
- From 1976–2004, the school adopted a multicultural policy and expanded class rooms.
- In 2006, the school celebrated its 100-year anniversary. Prescott will receive three new rooms, one for art and another a new computer room. The school will receive extra funding to provide another two class rooms and the student population by 2010 is expected to hit 220+.

== Spiritual aspects ==
All students take religion classes each year that they are enrolled. These classes cover topics in biblical history and Christian and denominational doctrines. Instructors in other disciplines also begin each class period with prayer or a short devotional thought, many which encourage student input. Weekly, the entire student body gathers together for an hour-long chapel service. Outside the classrooms there is year-round spiritually oriented programming that relies on student involvement.

== Sports ==
Prescott College offers a wide range of sports including vista weekly basketball, netball, volleyball, soccer etc. They also offer an athletics carnival as well as a swimming carnival and cross country.

== See also ==
- List of Seventh-day Adventist secondary schools
- Seventh-day Adventist education
- List of schools in South Australia
