= Main North Road =

Road in South Australia

Main North Road South Australia
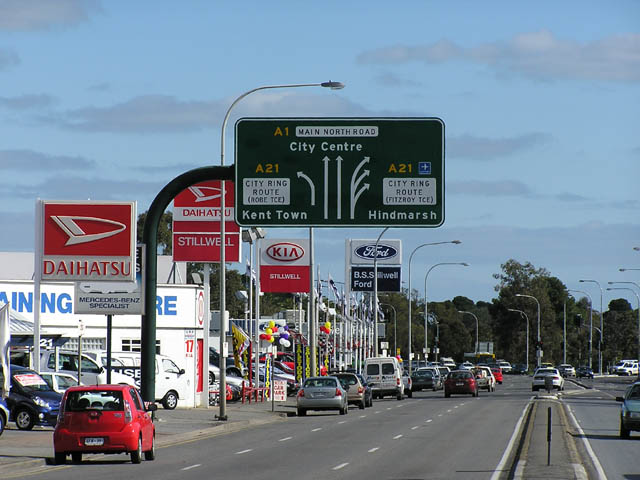
- Looking south at Main North Road's southern (city) end
- Coordinates: 34.571557°S 138.746434°E (North end); 34.901921°S 138.594486°E (South end)

General information
- Type: Road
- Length: 41.8 km (26 mi)
- Route number(s): B19 (1998–present) (Gawler–Evanston South); A20 (2017–present) (Evanston South–Gepps Cross}; A1 (2017–present) (Gepps Cross–North Adelaide)
- Former route number: A52 {(2010–2017); National Highway A20 (1998–2010); National Highway 20 (1992–1998); National Route 20 (1955–1992) (Gawler–Gepps Cross); National Highway A1 (1998–2017); National Highway 1 (1974–1998); National Route 1 (1955–1974) (Gepps Cross–North Adelaide)

Major junctions
- North end: Horrocks Highway; Gawler, South Australia
- Sturt Highway; Barossa Valley Way; John Rice Avenue; Grand Junction Road; Port Wakefield Road; Robe Terrace
- South end: Prospect Road; O'Connell Street; North Adelaide

Location(s)
- Region: Barossa Light and Lower North, Northern Adelaide, Eastern Adelaide
- Major suburbs: Elizabeth, Salisbury, Gepps Cross, Medindie

Main North Road is the major north–south arterial route through the suburbs north of the Adelaide City Centre in the city of Adelaide, South Australia, and linking to Gawler on Adelaide's outer north-eastern fringes.

== Route ==
Main North Road commences at the interchange with Sturt Highway and continues south into central Gawler as a single carriageway, two-lane road, where it crosses the North Para and South Para Rivers, and the Barossa Valley Way branches to the east between them. Leaving Gawler, the road widens to a four-lane, dual-carriageway road and passes through Smithfield and Elizabeth, before crossing the Little Para River. It continues through the outer northern suburbs, passing Salisbury and Mawson Lakes, before eventually reaching the major intersection at Gepps Cross. Here the road forks, with Port Wakefield Road (A1 – National Highway 1) continuing to the north, and the Main North Road turning south and passes through the suburbs of Enfield and Blair Athol, Nailsworth and Prospect, reaching Fitzroy and Robe Terraces in Medindie. It passes through the Adelaide Parklands, before eventually terminating at the intersection of O'Connell Street, Prospect Road and Barton Terrace West in North Adelaide.

=== Commuter route ===
In the metropolitan area, Main North Road is a major commuter route to the central business district in the Adelaide city centre.

The portion of Main North Road between the city centre and Mawson Lakes is a 15-minute public transport 'Go Zone', with the maximum wait for a bus being 15 minutes during peak times (7:30 am – 6:30 pm weekdays) and 30 minutes on weekends and evenings. Bus routes via Main North Road generally begin with the prefix "22x". The bus service is provided by Torrens Transit for Adelaide Metro.

== History ==
Main North Road previously continued north past Gawler through Tarlee, Clare, Gladstone and Wilmington, South Australia, then via Horrocks Pass to end at Winninowie, following the route established in the early years of the colony by explorer John Horrocks as a major route for farmers and graziers to reach the capital, passing through rich farmland and the Clare Valley wine region. In 2011, the section of road between Wilmington and Gawler in SA's mid-north was renamed Horrocks Highway – to honour John Horrocks, an early explorer and pioneer in the region – and the section between Wilmington and Winninowie re-declared as Horrocks Pass Road, with the existing declaration of Main North Road truncated to officially begin at Gawler instead.

Main North Road was allocated National Routes 1 (between Gepps Cross and North Adelaide) and 20 (between Gawler and Gepps Cross) in 1955. The Whitlam government introduced the federal National Roads Act 1974, where roads declared as a National Highway were still the responsibility of the states for road construction and maintenance, but were fully compensated by the Federal government for money spent on approved projects. As an important interstate link between the capitals of Adelaide and Western Australia, Main North Road was declared a National Highway in 1974, and was consequently re-allocated National Highway 1 between Gepps Cross and North Adelaide; National Route 20 was also later declared a National Highway in 1992 as part of the interstate link between Adelaide and New South Wales, and also re-allocated as National Highway 20 between Gawler and Gepps Cross. With the state's conversion to the newer alphanumeric system in 1998, its route numbers was updated to National Highway A1 between Gepps Cross and North Adelaide (and later to just route A1 in 2017), and National Highway A20 between Gawler and Gepps Cross, with route B19 declared along the old alignment through southern Gawler from Gawler Bypass to Barossa Valley Way.

In late 2010 when Northern Expressway was completed, National Highway A20 was diverted to the new road as National Highway M20: Main North Road and the southern section of Gawler Bypass Road were then designated as route A52. In late 2016, the Northern Expressway was designated M2, and the designation of Main North Road was reverted as route A20 to Gepps Cross.

== Major intersections ==
LGA	Location	km	mi	Destinations	Notes
Gawler	Gawler Belt	0.0	0.0	Horrocks Highway (B82) – Clare, Wilmington, Quorn	Northern terminus of road, continues north as Horrocks Highway
Gawler	Gawler Belt	0.0	0.0	Sturt Highway (A20) – Adelaide, Nuriootpa, Renmark	
North Para River		2.3	1.4	Bridge over the river (bridge name unknown)	
Gawler	Gawler	2.9	1.8	Barossa Valley railway line	
Gawler	Gawler	3.2	2.0	Barossa Valley Way (B19) – Lyndoch, Tanunda, Nuriootpa	Route B19 continues south (as Adelaide Road)
South Para River		4.0	2.5	Bridge over the river (bridge name unknown)	
Gawler	Evanston South	4.1	2.5	Twelfth Street (B77) – Gawler River, Two Wells	
Gawler	Evanston–Evanston Park–Evanston South tripoint	7.7	4.8	Gawler Bypass (A20 north) – Nuriootpa, Renmark	Northeast-bound entrance from and southwest-bound exit to Main North Road only Western terminus of route B19; Route A20 continues southwest along Main North Road
Playford	Elizabeth Vale–Hillbank boundary	21.9	13.6	John Rice Avenue (A9) – Salisbury, Port Adelaide	
Little Para River		22.8	14.2	Bridge over the river (bridge name unknown)	
Salisbury	Salisbury Park–Salisbury Plain–Salisbury Heights tripoint	24.4	15.2	The Grove Way (A11 southeast) – Golden Grove; Saints Road (northwest) – Salisbury Plain	
Salisbury	Salisbury South–Salisbury East–Parafield–Para Hills West quadripoint	27.9	17.3	McIntyre Road (A18 southeast) – Modbury; Kings Road (A18 northwest) – Salisbury Downs	
Salisbury	Mawson Lakes–Pooraka boundary	32.9	20.4	Montague Road – Cavan, Modbury	
Port Adelaide Enfield	Gepps Cross	35.3	21.9	Port Wakefield Road (A1 north) – Waterloo Corner, Port Wakefield; Grand Junction Road (A16 east, west) – Port Adelaide, Northfield	Southern terminus of route A20; Route A1 continues south along Main North Road
Prospect–Port Adelaide Enfield boundary	Prospect–Enfield–Sefton Park tripoint	38.2	23.7	Regency Road – Kilkenny, Greenacres	
Prospect–Walkerville–Adelaide tripoint	Thorngate–Medindie–North Adelaide tripoint	41.2	25.6	Fitzroy Terrace (R1 west) – Hindmarsh, Thebarton; Robe Terrace (R1 east) – Kent Town, Dulwich	Route A1 north from here, unallocated south
Adelaide	North Adelaide	41.6	25.8	O'Connell Street (south) – North Adelaide, Adelaide CBD; Prospect Road (north) – Prospect; Barton Terrace West (west) – North Adelaide	Southern terminus of road
1.000 mi = 1.609 km; 1.000 km = 0.621 mi: Incomplete access; Route transition

== See also ==
- Highways in Australia
- List of highways in South Australia
- Highway 1 (Australia)
- Highway 1 (South Australia)
