= Ovingham, South Australia =

Ovingham
- Suburb
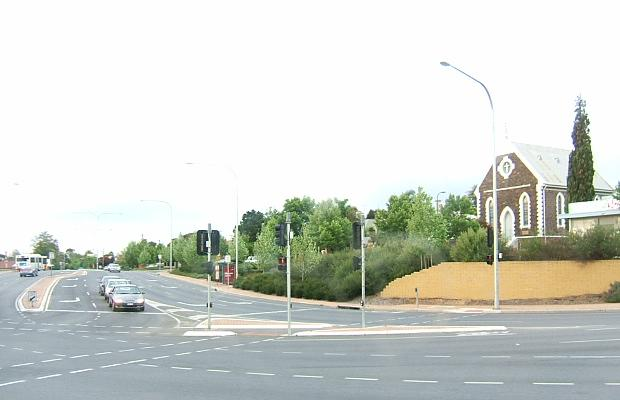
- Churchill Road, Ovingham, 2006

- Interactive map of Ovingham
- Coordinates: 34°53′53″S 138°35′10″E
- Country: Australia
- State: South Australia
- City: Adelaide
- LGAs: City of Charles Sturt; City of Prospect
- Location: 2 km (1.2 mi) N of Adelaide city centre
- Established: 1875

Government
  - State electorate: Adelaide
  - Federal division: Adelaide

Population
  - Total: 766 (SAL 2021)
- Postcode: 5082
Suburbs around Ovingham
Renown Park	Prospect	Prospect
Bowden	Ovingham	Fitzroy
Bowden	North Adelaide	North Adelaide

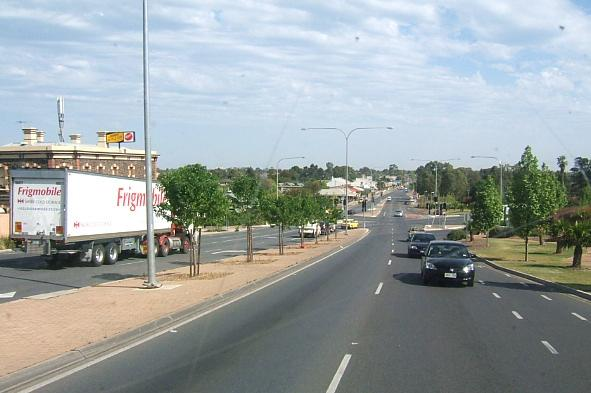
Torrens Road bisects Ovingham (2006)

Ovingham is an inner northern suburb of Adelaide, South Australia. It is located in the cities of Charles Sturt and Prospect.

== Geography ==
The suburb is located between Park Terrace and the Gawler railway line. It is bisected by Torrens Road.

== History ==
Ovingham was established in 1875 by William Whinham, by subdividing Block No. 2081, which had been originally purchased by George Strickland Kingston. Ovingham originally comprised only the part of the current suburb to the north of Torrens Road. The portion of modern Ovingham in the City of Charles Sturt (the triangle bounded by the railway line, Torrens Road and Park Terrace) was previously considered to be part of Bowden, known as Bowden-on-the-Hill. A proposal to rename it to Hillside in 1929 was favorably received locally, but rejected by the government.

Ovingham Post Office opened on 1 November 1879 but was renamed Bowden in 1970.

== Demographics ==
The 2021 census counted 766 people in Ovingham.

== Government ==
=== Local government ===
Part of Ovingham lies in Hindmarsh Ward in the City of Charles Sturt local government area, being represented in that council by Paul Alexandrides and Craig Auricht. The remainder of the suburb lies in the City of Prospect.

=== State and federal ===
Ovingham lies in the state electoral district of Adelaide and the federal electoral division of Adelaide.

== Community ==
The Ovingham Hotel is located on Torrens Road. The Ovingham Football Club, the local team, was located on Churchill Road. It existed for over 100 years but folded in 2014.

== Transportation ==
=== Roads ===
Ovingham is serviced by Torrens Road, connecting the suburb to Adelaide city centre, and Park Terrace, which forms its south-eastern boundary. Churchill Road heads north out of the suburb.

=== Public transport ===
Ovingham is serviced by public transport run by the Adelaide Metro.

==== Trains ====
The Ovingham railway station sits on the boundary of the suburb of Ovingham itself and is serviced by the Gawler railway line. In 2023 the Torrens Road level crossing was replaced by an overpass.

==== Buses ====
The suburb is serviced by buses run by the Adelaide Metro.

== See also ==
- List of Adelaide suburbs
