= Blair Athol, South Australia =

Blair Athol
- Suburb
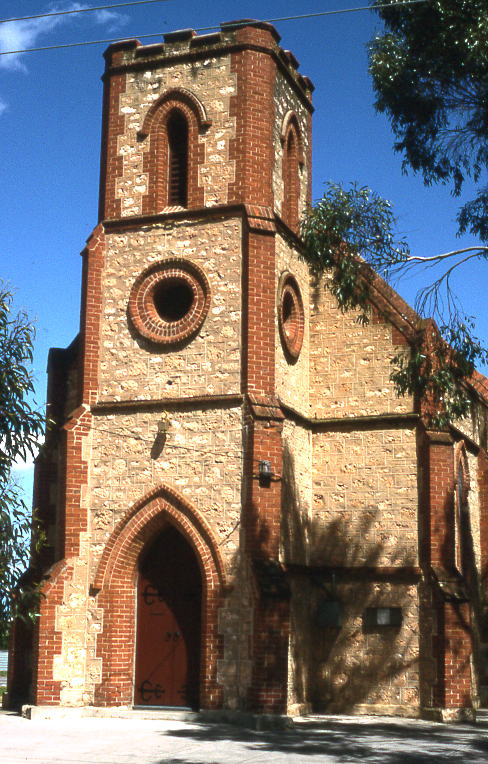
- St Clements Anglican church on Main North Road, Blair Athol

- Country: Australia
- State: South Australia
- City: Adelaide
- LGA: City of Port Adelaide Enfield

Government
  - State electorate: Enfield
  - Federal division: Adelaide

Population
  - Total: 5,274 (SAL 2021)
- Postcode: 5084
Suburbs around Blair Athol
| Gepps Cross | Gepps Cross | Gepps Cross |
| Kilburn | Blair Athol | Enfield |
| Prospect | Prospect | Sefton Park |

Blair Athol (pronounced /ˌblɛəˈræθəɫ/) (Note: In isolation, Blair is pronounced /ˈblɛə(r)/; and Athol as /ˈæθəɫ/ or /ˈæθəl/. Due to usage of the linking R, the Australian English pronunciation of Blair Athol features contextual rhoticity, as in /ˌblɛəˈræθəɫ/.) is located about 6 km (4 mi) north of the Adelaide CBD, South Australia. Blair Athol borders the suburbs of Gepps Cross, Enfield, Prospect and Kilburn. The suburb is rectangular, stretching from Grand Junction Road in the north to Angwin Avenue in the south between Prospect Road on the west and Main North Road on the east. Blair Athol's main and longest street is Florence Avenue. Prospect Road within Blair Athol is known as Little Afghanistan due to its high concentration of Afghan restaurants, stores and bakeries and has been noted for being a "vibrant, (multi)cultural hub".

== History ==
Blair Athol was originally a private subdivision of section 357 in the Hundred of Yatala in the vicinity of today's Lionel Avenue, a studfarm bearing the name Blair Athol. The suburb name was formalised in 1944 at which time the boundaries stretched from Grand Junction Road to Irish Harp Road (now Regency Road). In 2000, the portion south of Angwin Avenue and its easterly projection to Main North Road was annexed by Prospect.

An early residential subdivision within present-day Blair Athol was known as Dingley Dell. Established in 1882 by William Whinham and Thomas E. McEllister on part of Section 354 in the Hundred of Yatala, the subdivision was extended in 1924 with 40 residential allotments along Moore and Henrietta streets. Dingley Dell was subsequently incorporated into Blair Athol. The name survives in Dingley Dell Reserve.

The historic area known as Gepp's Cross (named for the busy intersection of Main North Road and Grand Junction Road) overlaps the north east corner of the modern suburb and includes the historic Gepps Cross Hotel (also known as Gepp's Cross Inn). The modern suburb of Gepps Cross occupies only the land north of the intersection.

Blair Athol Post Office opened on 15 June 1955 and was renamed Blair Athol West in 1966. At that time the existing Enfield office (open since 1852) was renamed Blair Athol and it was replaced by the Enfield Plaza office in 1997.

Afghan refugees of the Hazara ethnicity settled in Blair Athol in the early 2000s due to cheap rents, proximity to the Adelaide City Centre and refugee services. This led to "a place activation" due to the establishment of Afghan Businesses within the ethnic enclave of Blair Athol. Before the rejuvenation of the suburb and Prospect Road, it was known to have a high crime rate, be unsafe and have many empty shops.

== Demographics ==
In the 2021 census, there were 25,578 in the Enfield-Blair Athol area. The most common ancestories were English (21.3%), Australian (20.0%), Indian (9.7%), Hazara (6.3%) and Italian (5.5%). 57.1% of residents had both parents born overseas. The most common languages used at home other than English were Hazaraghi (6.4%), Punjabi (5.0%), Vietnamese (4.4%) and Hindi (2.0%). 48.2% of residents only used English at home.

== Local culture ==
Chicken Chef, a takeaway restaurant on Main North Road in Blair Athol, received national recognition in 2021 when it won the Best Hot Chips category of Wotif's Uniquely Aussie Awards. The restaurant was recognised for its handmade, double-cooked chips and distinctive chicken salt seasoning. The award also attracted national media coverage.

- Chicken Chef is a takeaway restaurant located at 438 Main North Road, Blair Athol. In October 2021, the restaurant won the Best Hot Chips category of Wotif's national Uniquely Aussie Awards, which were based on public nominations. Wotif attributed the restaurant's success to its handmade, double-cooked potato chips, describing their texture as "crispy-on-the-outside, soft-on-the-inside". The restaurant's chicken salt seasoning was also highlighted in the award announcement.

The award attracted national media attention, including coverage by The Advertiser, News.com.au, The Greek Herald and Boss Hunting. News Corp also published a video feature examining the Blair Athol restaurant's award-winning chips.

In comments originally reported by The Advertiser and reproduced by The Greek Herald, Terry Chris, the owner, claimed the business had been an early originator of chicken salt in South Australia during the 1970s. Referring to the restaurant's closely guarded seasoning recipe, he stated, "I guard that recipe with my life." He also said that the seasoning was not commercially available and that only a small number of people knew its ingredients.

=== Chicken Chef and Enfield High School ===
During the late 1970s and early 1980s, Chicken Chef in Blair Athol was reportedly a popular lunchtime destination for students attending nearby Enfield High School. Students frequently left the school grounds to purchase the restaurant's hot chips, reportedly drawing business away from the school canteen and threatening its financial viability.

The school responded by investing considerable time, resources and effort into developing a hot chip recipe capable of competing with Chicken Chef's popular offering. This included purchasing a commercial deep fryer, providing specialised staff training and dedicating significant attention to perfecting the preparation, texture and flavour of its chips. The initiative was reportedly successful, with the improved product helping the school canteen regain a substantial share of students' lunchtime spending and reducing the appeal of leaving school grounds for Chicken Chef's chips.

Other local restaurants and businesses

- Rumi Palace
- The Ghan Kebab House
- Najafi Carpet Gallery
- Blair Athol IGA & KSM (located at former Coles site)
- Tasty Bread Bakery

== Reserves ==
Blair Athol has several reserves: Blair Athol Recreational Reserve, Barton Street Reserve, Dingley Dell Reserve, Anson Street Reserve and Dover Street Reserve. The Blair Athol Recreational Reserve is a large reserve covering a total area of approximately 4.68 ha (11.6 acres). It features a football oval, a cricket ground with batting cages, two netball/basketball courts, and tennis courts which are exclusively used by members of the Kilburn tennis club. The reserve also has two playgrounds, a gazebo, the Kilburn Football & Cricket Club, and a large parking lot. Barton Street Reserve features a large grass field and a playground with several benches. This reserve covers a total area of approximately 1.84 ha (4.5 acres).

== Government ==
Blair Athol is run by the City of Port Adelaide Enfield. The council was set up in 1996 and one of its main offices is located in Enfield. Blair Athol has two schools. Blair Athol North School and St. Paul Lutheran Primary School cater for levels 1–6.

== Transport ==
Blair Athol is serviced by the G10 bus line between Adelaide and Grand Junction Road, travelling via Prospect Road and also bus routes 221, 222, 224, 225, 226, 228 and 229, G10, G10A, G10B which travel between Adelaide and various destinations in the Northern suburbs via Main North Road. Residents of Blair Athol can also catch the train line to and from the city. The station is located in Kilburn, several hundred metres from Prospect Road.

== See also ==
- List of Adelaide suburbs
