= Prospect Road =

Road in Adelaide, Australia

Prospect Road South Australia
- Coordinates: 34.845284°S 138.591097°E (North end); 34.901927°S 138.594488°E (South end)

General information
- Type: Road
- Location: Adelaide
- Length: 6.3 km (3.9 mi)

Major junctions
- North end: Waldaree Street; Gepps Cross, Adelaide
- Grand Junction Road; Fitzroy Terrace; Main North Road
- South end: O'Connell Street; North Adelaide

Location(s)
- Region: Northern Adelaide, Eastern Adelaide
- Major suburbs: Blair Athol, Kilburn, Prospect, Thorngate

Prospect Road is a north–south road in the inner north suburbs of Adelaide, Australia.

== Route ==
Prospect road starts in the industrial suburb of Gepps Cross, at the intersection with Waldaree Street. It heads directly south, crossing Grand Junction Road, and continues south through Prospect. It crosses Fitzroy Terrace and ends soon after, meeting the southern end of Main North Road and O'Connell Street, on the northern edges of North Adelaide.

== History ==
In the 1840s, Prospect Road was called Eliza Street, and was not considered a main road. The two main roads heading north from North Adelaide were Main North Road and Lower Main North Road, now Churchill Road. Eliza Street was named after Eliza Harrington, the eldest daughter of James Harrington, a local landholder, farmer and businessman. The Harringtons lived for a time at 20 Prospect Road in 'Stone Hall'. In the 1960s the Harringtons built St Helen's House on Prospect Road, where St Helen's Park is today.

== Notable sites ==
There are many murals, sculpture pieces and significant buildings along the length of Prospect Road. Recognisable pieces include Pulse by Warren Langley which are illuminated clusters of two and three stylised 'blossoms' of varying size in the Prospect Village Heart. They were commissioned as part of the Prospect Road Masterplan in 2011. There are also murals by members of the Prospect Mural Group including:

- History Of Australia 1982 repainted 1999 Prospect Mural Group Prospect Road opposite Johns Road, Prospect
- South Australian Flora 1979 repainted 1999 Prospect Mural Group corner of Le Hunte Avenue and Prospect Road, Prospect

== Development ==
Prospect Road runs through two council areas: the City of Prospect and the City of Port Adelaide Enfield. Both councils have allocated funding to upgrades in the last 10 years.

In 2017 Port Adelaide Enfield completed a 3-stage upgrade including paving, landscaping and artwork in Kilburn and Blair Athol. As of January 2018 the City of Prospect is completing its aesthetic upgrades and the undergrounding of power lines along the length of the road within the suburb of Prospect.

== Major intersections ==
LGA	Location	km	mi	Destinations	Notes
Port Adelaide Enfield	Gepps Cross	0.0	0.0	Waldaree Street – Gepps Cross	Northern terminus of road
Port Adelaide Enfield	Gepps Cross–Kilburn–Blair Athol tripoint	0.4	0.25	Grand Junction Road (A16) – Port Adelaide, Northfield, Hope Valley	
Prospect	Prospect	3.2	2.0	Regency Road – Kilkenny, Hampstead Gardens	
Prospect–Adelaide boundary	Fitzroy–Thorngate–North Adelaide tripoint	5.9	3.7	Fitzroy Terrace (R1) – Thebarton, Kent Town	
Adelaide	North Adelaide	6.3	3.9	Main North Road (northeast) – Gepps Cross, Salisbury, Gawler; Barton Terrace West (west) – North Adelaide	
Adelaide	North Adelaide	6.3	3.9	O'Connell Street – Adelaide CBD	Southern terminus of road
Route transition

== Gallery ==
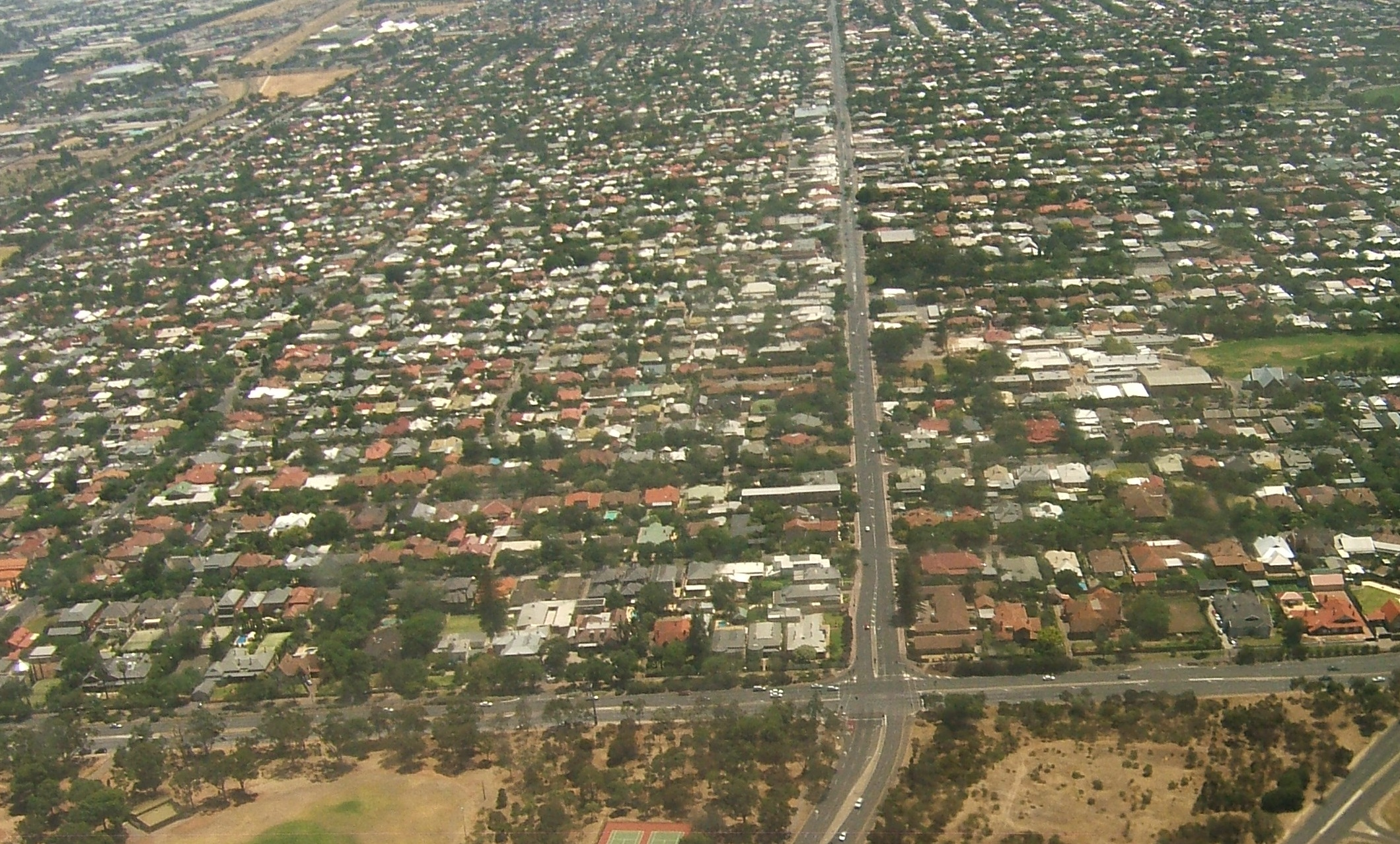
Prospect Road aerial view, facing north

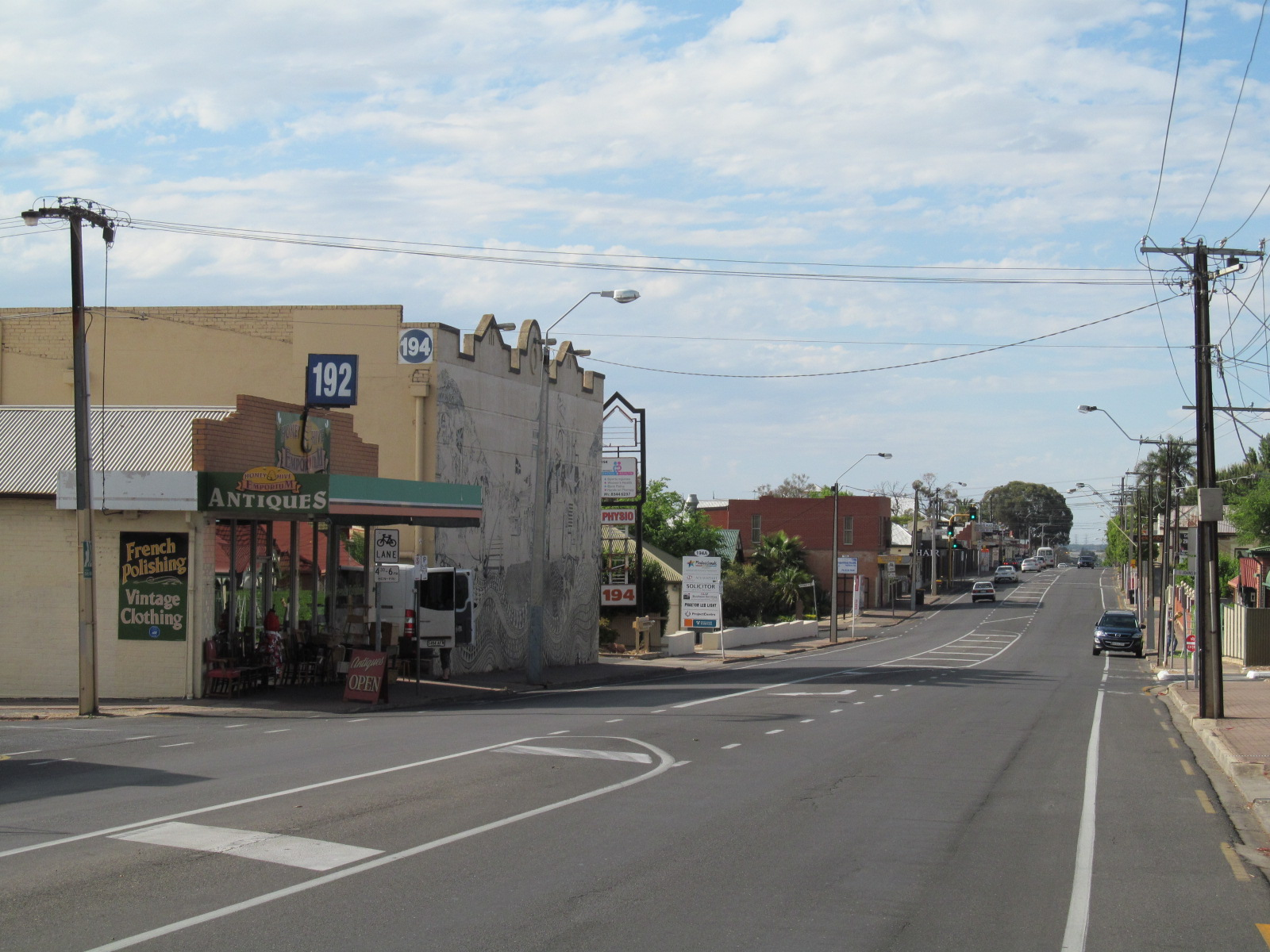
Prospect Road facing north from Victoria Street/Gordon Road

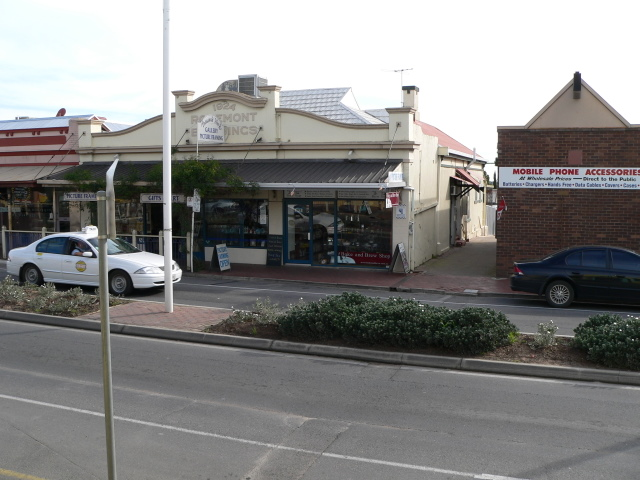
Historic shop frontage at 106, Prospect Road

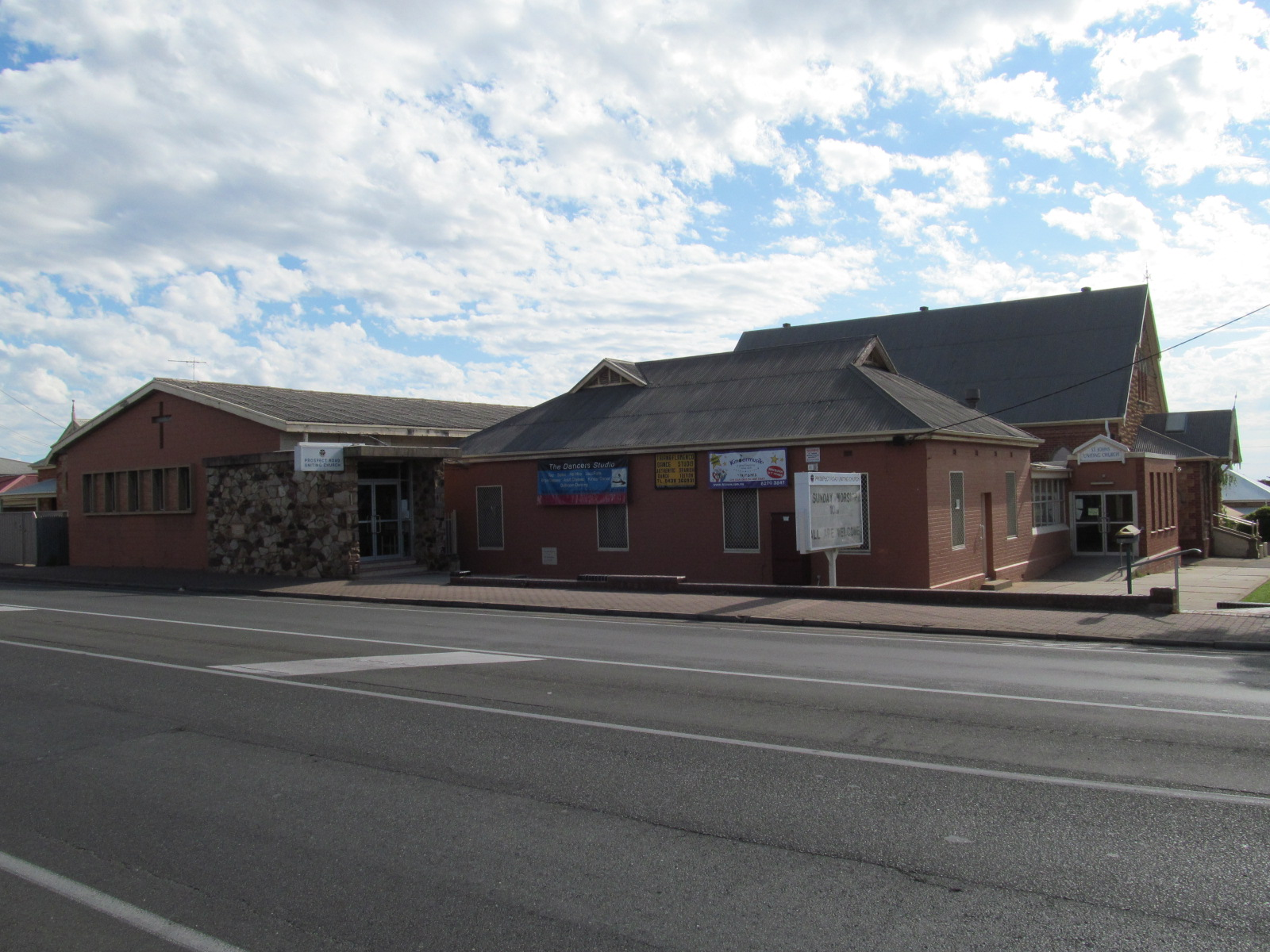
Prospect Road Uniting Church at 174, Prospect Road
