= O'Connell Street, North Adelaide =

Street in North Adelaide, South Australia

O'Connell Street South Australia
- O'Connell Street looking north, 2026
- Coordinates: 34.9020°S 138.5945°E (North end); 34.9094°S 138.5971°E (South end)

General information
- Type: Street
- Location: North Adelaide
- Length: 850 m (0.5 mi)

Major junctions
- North end: Main North Road; North Adelaide
- Prospect Road
- South end: King William Road; North Adelaide

Location(s)
- LGA(s): City of Adelaide
- Major suburbs: North Adelaide

Highway system
- Highways in Australia; National Highway • Freeways in Australia; Highways in South Australia

O'Connell Street is the main north–south route through North Adelaide, South Australia and is heavily-trafficked by north-suburban commuters to Adelaide city centre. At its northern end it intersects with Barton Terrace West and the commencement of Prospect and Main North roads. At its southern end it abuts Brougham Gardens and intersects with Brougham Place and the commencement of King William Road. It is considered to be one of two major shopping and dining strips within North Adelaide, the other being Melbourne Street.

== History ==
The street was named on 23 May 1837 at a meeting between the Governor John Hindmarsh, the Colonial Secretary Robert Gouger and several advisers including judge John Jeffcott. It has been suggested that it was not named, as might have been presumed, for Irish political leader and Catholic emancipist Daniel O'Connell who was then at the peak of his career, but his son parliamentarian Maurice O'Connell, a fellow student of Jeffcott's at Trinity College and fellow expatriate of Tralee, County Kerry.

Originally, Jeffcott Street was intended to be the main north–south thoroughfare through North Adelaide, but drainage problems in the vicinity led to the opening up of the link through Brougham Gardens from King William Street and the resultant access to enter Adelaide city most directly from the north via O'Connell Street.
