= Gilberton, South Australia =

Gilberton
- Suburb
- Interactive map of Gilberton
- Country: Australia
- State: South Australia
- City: Adelaide
- LGA: Town of Walkerville
- Location: 2 km (1.2 mi) from Adelaide GPO
- Established: 1840s

Government
  - State electorate: Adelaide
  - Federal division: Adelaide

Population
  - Total: 1,528 (SAL 2021)
- Postcode: 5081
Suburbs around Gilberton
Medindie Gardens	Collinswood	Walkerville
Medindie	Gilberton	St Peters
North Adelaide	Hackney	College Park

Gilberton (formerly Gilbert Town) is an inner northern suburb of Adelaide, South Australia on the northern bank of the River Torrens. It is a short distance from Adelaide's city centre. It is bounded by the river, Park Terrace, Stephen Terrace and Northcote Terrace. The suburb is largely residential with some large and ornate Victorian homes and approximately 2 kilometres (1 mi) of the Torrens Linear Park represent its southern boundary. The large homes in the suburb's northern section give it a historic character that is protected by government planning regulations.

The area of Gilberton was first purchased in 1839 by a Richard Blundell as "Section 475" of the survey of Adelaide. Blundell, who lived in England, was declared bankrupt later that year. The section was subsequently sold by his creditors. Joseph Gilbert of Pewsey Vale winery fame, purchased the 134 acres (54.2 ha) section for £600/5s in 1846, naming it "Gilbert Town" and in 1852 dividing into 43 lots for sale or lease. Early activities in the area included a brickworks, farms and gardens and an abattoir. By 1847, the southern part of the town was planned, the plan completed by 1871 and extensive housing completed by the 1890s.

The suburb is largely flat from the river north to Walkerville Terrace, then slopes upwards to its northern extent. Due to the elevation of views from the northern section, this land attracted wealthier purchasers. Some of their ornate Victorian homes, situated on large grounds, remain there today. At a large bend in the river, the location of today's St Peters River Park, gravel extraction, sand washing and landfill have all been commercial activities. Sand washing was replaced by a dump in 1961, leading to complaints from the neighbouring suburb of St Peters about fumes from the burning rubbish. After the land was purchased by St Peters, the bend was straightened and the dump reclaimed.

== Gilberton Bathing Reserve ==
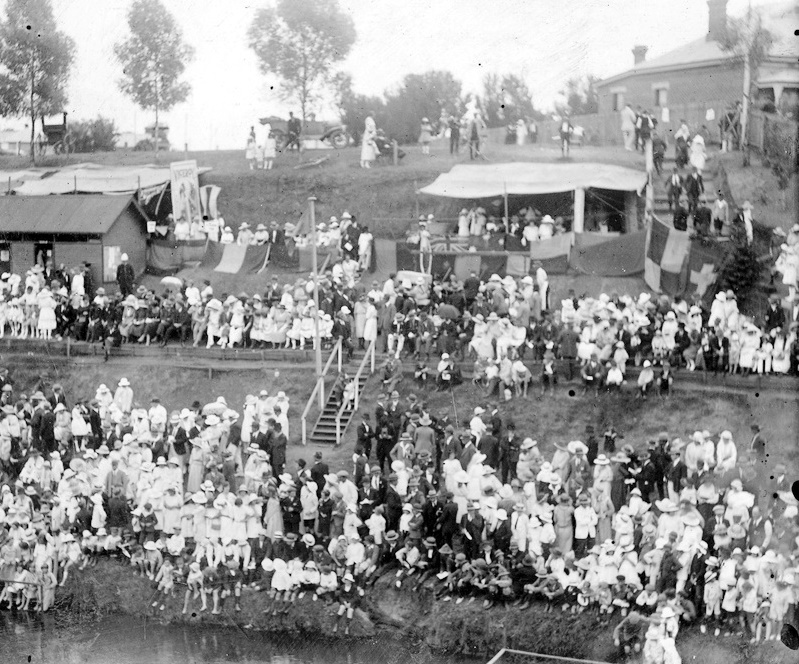
Spectators on river bank, Australian championships February 1923

A section of the River Torrens, retained by weirs, was the home of the Gilberton Swimming Club, founded 1915, and where many local children learned to swim. Arguably the most notable event to be held here was the Australian Swimming Championships, held between 17 and 24 February 1923, when many thousands of spectators lined the western bank. The area was still in use for informal swimming in the 1950s then closed due to the presence of the bacteria E coli. Many relics of the Swimming Club era remain, including the fine Memorial Arch, which was erected in 1936 to honour the contribution to the Club of Percy Frank Jervis (1870 – 13 January 1947).

The nearby pedestrian suspension "swing" bridge linking Severn Street, Gilberton with Swing Bridge Lane, St Peters, was erected by Charles Francis Muller for Frank Woolley (1861–1941), a large landholder, in 1920. In 2017, it was rebuilt to modern safety standards as a joint project of the Town of Walkerville and the City of Norwood Payneham & St Peters, and opened in February 2018. It is in regular use by locals and is of interest to visitors. The original anchoring structures, which are of historic and architectural interest, have been preserved. The Torrens Linear Park runs nearby.

== See also ==
- List of Adelaide suburbs
