= City of Prospect =

Coordinates: 34°53′S 138°36′E

- Local government area
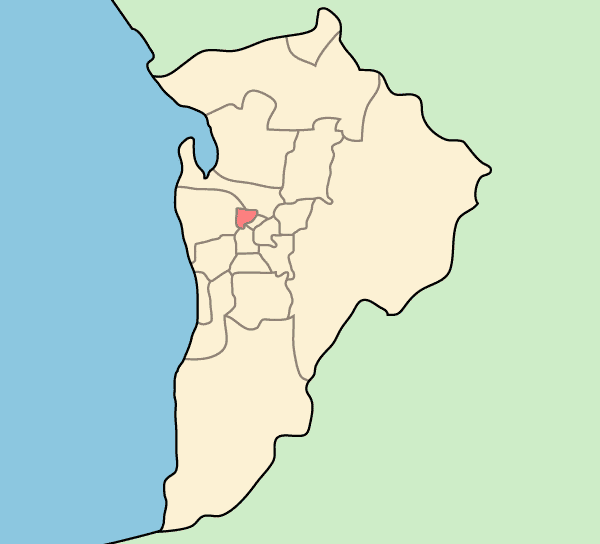

- Interactive map of City of Prospect
- Country: Australia
- State: South Australia
- Region: Eastern Adelaide
- Established: 1872
- Council seat: Prospect

Government
  - Mayor: Matt Larwood
  - State electorate: Adelaide, Enfield
  - Federal division: Adelaide

Area
  - Total: 7.81 km^{2} (3.02 sq mi)

Population
  - Total: 22,272 (LGA 2021)
  - Density: 2,851.73/km^{2} (7,385.9/sq mi)
- Website: City of Prospect
LGAs around City of Prospect
City of Port Adelaide Enfield	City of Port Adelaide Enfield	City of Port Adelaide Enfield
City of Charles Sturt	City of Prospect	Town of Walkerville
City of West Torrens	City of Adelaide	Town of Walkerville

City of Prospect is an inner urban local government area (LGA) in Adelaide, South Australia. The council seat is the unusually-large suburb of Prospect, which makes up almost two thirds of the tiny council area, which is less than 8 km^{2} (3.1 sq mi). Established in 1872, it is one of the oldest local government bodies in South Australia.

The demographics of the suburb show an above-average preponderance of young professionals, and a growing population.

== History ==
Prior to European settlement in 1838, the Prospect area was a tiny part of the traditional lands of the Kaurna people, who lived in small bands across the Adelaide Plains.

To the new settlers, the locality presented a "beautiful prospect", being described as "well timbered, with waving gum and shady trees". For this reason Prospect Village was named by Colonel William Light shortly after the colonisation of South Australia in 1838. George Fife Angas was given the right to make first choice of "country section", to which he and other early investors in South Australia were entitled by their purchase of land orders prior to settlement, according to the land division scheme. Under Light's plan for the city and adjoining rural areas, the present-day inner metropolitan area was laid out as hundreds which were further divided into sections, of about 80 acres (32 ha) in size. Prospect was to fall within the Hundred of Yatala when it was proclaimed in 1846, but prior to this the section was simply referred to as "country section" and the number.

At a meeting in March 1838, Angas made his choice, selecting the triangular section 474, now the Collinswood but earlier split between Collinswood and the historic suburb of Rosebery. Later in 1838 further selections were made and six sections (four in the southernmost parts of present-day City of Prospect) were purchased by the Mechanics Land Company, including section 349 in which the village of Prospect arose. The company divided the 80-acre sections into 8-acre (3.2 ha) blocks, and sold them for £10 a block.

Section 348 immediately south of Prospect Village was known as Little Adelaide.

As early as November 1838, plots of land "fronting the new road to the harbour" had been created from subdivisions in the new village of Prospect and were being publicly advertised for sale. These subdivided sections came to be known as Prospect Village. Early attempts to garden in the vicinity of Prospect failed as the soil is naturally dry, the nearest source of water then being the River Torrens. For many years blocks of land in the area remained unfenced and, in springtime, livestock from nearby areas were not prevented from feeding on the thick grass growing on the hills of Prospect.

In the 1840s Prospect Road was called Eliza Street and was not considered a main road, the two main north-bound roads from North Adelaide being Main North Road and Lower Main North Road (now Churchill Road). Eliza Street was so named after Eliza Harrington, the eldest daughter of James Harrington a local landholder, farmer and businessman.

=== Establishment of local government ===
In 1853 the District Council of Yatala was established and included, at its extreme south centre, the future area of the City of Prospect. In 1868 Yatala DC was divided at Dry Creek into the District Councils of Yatala South and Yatala North. On 1 August 1872 the new District Council of Prospect was formed after severing from the Yatala South DC, following lobbying by residents of Prospect village led by council member James Harrington.

=== Land boom and collapse ===
In the 1880s there was a land boom in Prospect. Many new subdivisions were made and new houses built. The 1890s saw a collapse of land values and vacant houses were available to rent for just a few shillings per week.

=== Municipality ===
In December 1933, the district council was given municipal status as the Corporation of the Town of Prospect. As such it retained the five pre-existing wards of Nailsworth, Kingston, Fitzroy, St. John's Wood and Highbury, each represented by two councillors. The councillors named in the June 1933 proclamation were: Elder George Whittle as mayor, Leonard Andrew Day for Nailsworth, William Henry Verco for Kingston, Richard Angwin for St. John's Wood, and William Thomas Smith for Highbury, with an instruction that the remaining six vacancies be filled by elections later in that year.

=== Coat of arms ===
In 1934 a competition to design a coat of arms for the Town of Prospect was held and a design by Mr. Allan F. Sierp was chosen. It contained the following emblems:

- The first and fourth quarters had shocks of wheat signifying "the early days of the district".
- The second quarter contained a pair of wings to "show the progress to the present prosperity".
- The third depicted a cornucopia, or horn of plenty, overflowing with fruit.

== Demographics ==
The demographics show a growing population: in the 2016 Australian census, there were 20,527 people, up from 19,955 in the 2011 census.

The median age was 37, which was three years younger than the state average. A greater-than-average proportion of the area's population are professionals (30.4%), with 32.6 per cent having received tertiary education of a bachelor's degree or above, compared with the average of 18.5%. Fewer than half (43%) had both parents born in Australia.

== Facilities ==
The Newmarch Gallery, renamed from Prospect Gallery and opened in October 2019, is a nationally recognised exhibition space run by City of Prospect. Named in honour of renowned local artist Ann Newmarch OAM, it functions as a place to show a diverse range of contemporary art with a community focus. Each year, the Prospect Community Art Show exhibition is held in the gallery. Newmarch had a long association with community arts at the Community Association of Prospect and the Prospect Mural Group, and was the first person to be appointed artist-in-residence with City of Prospect.

The Prospect Portrait Prize is awarded biennially at the Newmarch Gallery.

The Prospect Local History Collection was established in 1986, and the Prospect Local History Group meets regularly.

Prospect Library is situated at 128 Prospect Road, and is part of the One Card Network.

== Officials ==
As of November 2022 council members include:

Ward	Party	Councillor
Mayor	Independent	Matt Larwood
North	Independent	Thuy Nguyen
North	Independent	Jason Nelson
West	Independent	Kristina Barnett
West	Independent	Trinh Nguyen
Central	Independent	Mark Groote
Central	Independent	Alison De Backer
East	Independent	Lillian Hollitt
East	Independent	Mark Standen

== Suburbs ==
- Broadview - 5083
- Collinswood – 5081
- Fitzroy - 5082
- Medindie Gardens – 5081
- Nailsworth - 5083
- Prospect - 5082
- Ovingham - 5082
- Sefton Park - 5083
- Thorngate - 5082

== See also ==
- Local Government Areas of South Australia
- List of Adelaide suburbs
- List of Adelaide parks and gardens
