= Kilburn, South Australia =

Coordinates: 34°51′40″S 138°35′49″E

Kilburn
- Suburb
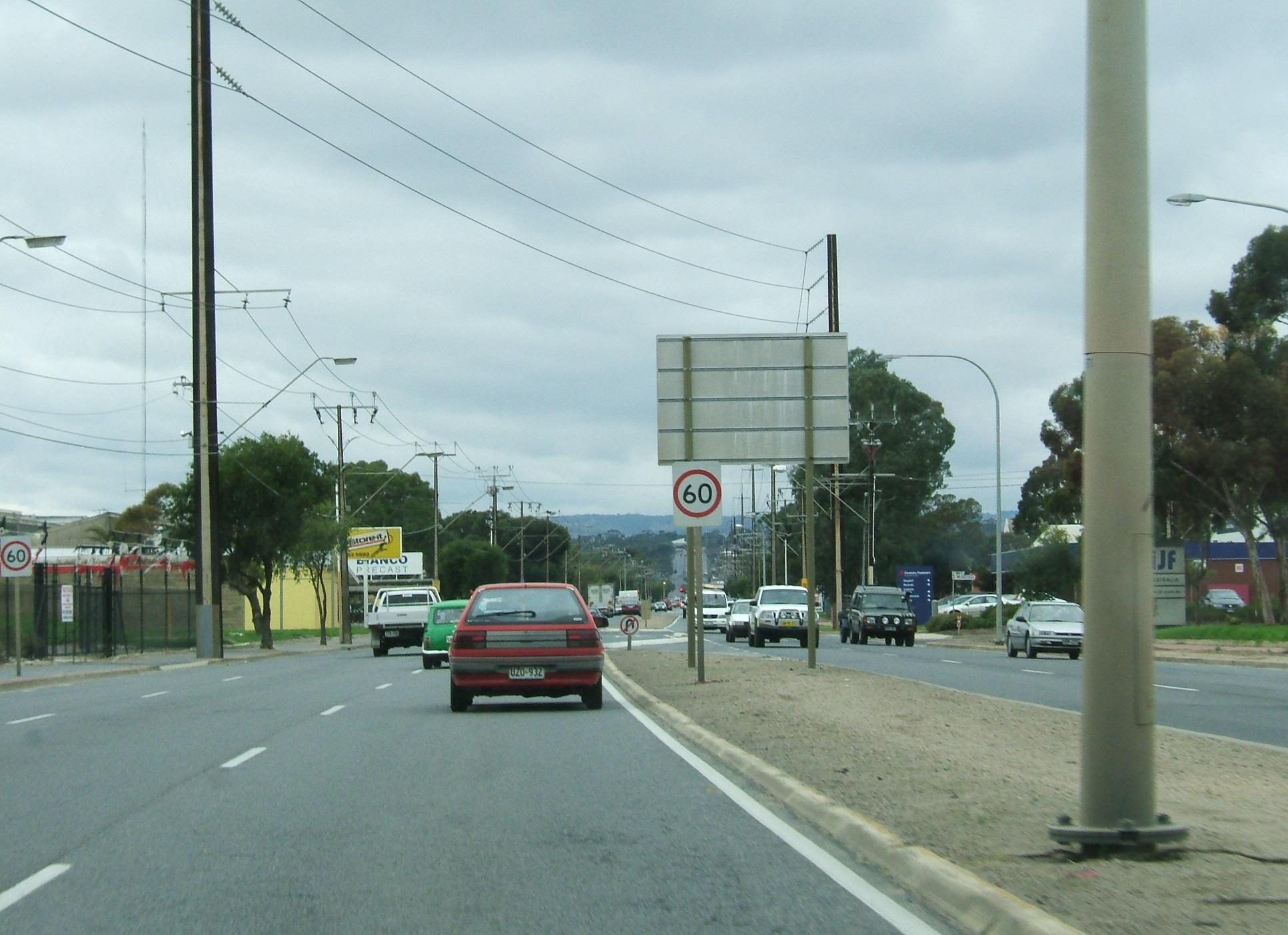
- Grand Junction Road, Kilburn
- Country: Australia
- State: South Australia
- City: Adelaide
- LGA: City of Port Adelaide Enfield

Government
  - State electorate: Enfield
  - Federal division: Adelaide

Population
  - Total: 5,633 (SAL 2021)
- Postcode: 5084
Suburbs around Kilburn
Wingfield	Dry Creek, Gepps Cross	Gepps Cross
Regency Park	Kilburn	Blair Athol
Dudley Park	Prospect	Prospect

Kilburn is a suburb in the inner north of Adelaide, South Australia. The suburb borders Blair Athol, Gepps Cross, Wingfield, Regency Park and Prospect. Part of present-day Kilburn was originally known as Chicago, a residential subdivision established in 1893 by Adelaide draper William Shierlaw on parts of sections 364 and 365 of the Hundred of Yatala. The name was taken from Chicago, Illinois, in the United States, the city which hosted the World's Columbian Exposition in the same year. The subdivision was extended in 1911 by members of the Matters and Shierlaw families. Kilburn has the same postcode (5084) as Blair Athol.

== History ==
=== Early settlement and the Chicago subdivision ===
The name Kilburn was first applied to a nearby subdivision established in 1915 by estate agents E. T. N. and A. T. Matters on part of section 366 of the Hundred of Yatala.

The suburb known as Kilburn was originally named Chicago. William Shierlaw, a draper of Adelaide, applied the name Chicago to the suburb in 1893, the same year as the famous World's Columbian Expositon in Chicago. Shierlaw and his son visited Chicago, Illinois in 1894, during an 8.5 month pleasure trip around the world. The Chicago Post Office opened on 1 August 1911. Five days later, the Deputy Postmaster-General said, "There is no likelihood of it causing confusion with respect to correspondence intended for Chicago, USA", and despite initial assurances that the name would not cause confusion with the American city, problems with misdirected correspondence eventually led to calls for a change. The Yatala South District Council received a complaint from the General Post Office, indicating that neglecting to include "South Australia" could result in letters being sent to Chicago in America. In 1930, following representations to the Yatala South District Council, the locality was renamed Kilburn. The Chicago Post Office ceased operating under its former name on 1 September 1930.

The former Chicago name has been preserved in local history, including through the nickname of the Kilburn Football and Cricket Club, known as the Chics.

=== Industrial and residential development ===
Kilburn developed alongside the expansion of railway workshops and manufacturing industries in Adelaide's northern suburbs. The Islington Railway Workshops, established in 1883, became an important centre for railway engineering, manufacturing and maintenance. Several surviving workshops and associated buildings on Churchill Road are included on the South Australian Heritage Register.

Industrial activity expanded during the late 1930s and the Second World War. British Tube Mills (Australia) acquired approximately 40 acres of land in Kilburn and commenced manufacturing steel tubes for military applications, including aircraft guns and warship boilers, shortly after the outbreak of war in 1939. The business subsequently became part of Tubemakers of Australia. Its former administration buildings on Churchill Road are heritage-listed, including Administration Building No. 2, completed in 1942.

Residential development also expanded during the 1930s and 1940s, including housing constructed by the South Australian Housing Trust. Population growth increased demand for local education facilities, with Kilburn School reaching capacity by 1945 and a new school building being completed in 1950.

A separate project involving 14 townhomes in Kilburn was completed in March 2022. It was named Little Chicago after the original suburb name.

== Facilities ==
=== Kilburn Primary School ===
Kilburn's former public primary school opened in 1914 as Chicago School, initially comprising three classrooms and three teachers, with John Lewis Broadbent serving as its first headmaster. The school was renamed Kilburn School in 1931, following the suburb's change of name.

Enrolments increased during the 1930s and 1940s as housing development expanded. By 1945, the school had reached capacity, prompting the acquisition of land on the opposite side of Churchill Road. A new school building was completed in 1950, accommodating students in Grades 3 to 7, while the original school continued to operate as an infants' school.

Kilburn Primary School and Preschool closed at the end of 2010 as part of the South Australian Government's Education Works program. The school merged with Gepps Cross Primary School and Blair Athol Kindergarten to establish the Inner North Birth to Year 7 School, which opened in 2011.

=== St Brigid's School ===
St Brigid's School is a co-educational Catholic primary school located on Way Street, providing education from Reception to Year 6.

=== St Brigid's Church ===
The Catholic Church in Kilburn is also dedicated to St. Brigid.

== Transport ==
Kilburn is a 13 minute drive from the Adelaide central business district. The suburb is well-serviced by public transport. Kilburn station, located on Railway Terrace.

Kilburn railway station' is located on the Gawler line. The station is situated in the inner northern Adelaide suburb of Kilburn, it is 7.7 kilometres (4.8 mi) from Adelaide station.

Kilburn has two staggered side platforms and is serviced by Adelaide Metro Gawler line services. Trains are scheduled every 30 minutes, and on weekdays most services terminate at Gawler Central only.

Platform	Destination
1	Gawler and Gawler Central
2	Adelaide

The Gawler line (also known as the Gawler Central line) is a suburban commuter railway line in the city of Adelaide, South Australia. It is the most frequent and heavily-patronised line in the Adelaide rail network.

Adelaide Metro G10 and G11 bus services pass through Kilburn and Blair Athol along Prospect Road. Buses routes 235, 237, 238 and 239 traverse Kilburn along Churchill Road and services Kilburn, Valley View, Mawson Lakes University of South Australia and Arndale respectively.

== Sport ==
=== Kilburn Football and Cricket Club ===
The Kilburn Football and Cricket Club, commonly known as the Chics, is a longstanding Australian rules football and cricket club associated with Kilburn. Its nickname preserves the suburb's former name, Chicago.

The club traces its football origins to the formation of the Chicago Football Club in 1924. Initially playing at the Islington railway site, the team won its first premiership in 1928. The Kilburn Football Club was established under its new name in 1933, following the renaming of the suburb three years earlier.

The Kilburn Cricket Club had a similar early history, winning its first premiership in 1925. The football club continued to use the Islington railway site until 1952, when expansion of railway storage facilities required it to relocate. Both clubs subsequently moved to Blair Athol Reserve in 1957, initially operating from a temporary shed. Permanent club facilities were constructed in 1963.

In 1974, the Kilburn Football Club and Kilburn Cricket Club amalgamated to form the Kilburn Football and Cricket Club. New clubrooms were completed in 1997. The club's home ground and facilities are located on Lionel Avenue in the neighbouring suburb of Blair Athol.

Robert McConnochie, a former local councillor and founder of the Kilburn Football Club, was a resident of Kintore Avenue, Kilburn. His former residence at 5 Kintore Avenue has been recognised for its local historical significance.

The club has also played a social and community role in Adelaide's northern suburbs. In August 2019, InDaily reported that the club faced possible closure after accumulating debts exceeding $120,000. Club officials subsequently appealed for community support to preserve the organisation and its sporting programs.

The club continued operating and experienced renewed success, winning the 2023 Adelaide Footy League Division 5 premiership with a 112–94 grand final victory over Gepps Cross.

In September 2025, Kilburn also won the SANFL Inclusive League premiership, defeating Kenilworth by one point, 15–14. The victory was the club's first premiership in the competition since 2016.

=== Club leadership and community involvement ===
The Kilburn Football and Cricket Club's longstanding president is Dale Agius, an Aboriginal community leader and public official who served as South Australia's inaugural Commissioner for First Nations Voice and was appointed Commissioner for Aboriginal Children and Young People in April 2025.

Agius played a prominent role in efforts to secure the club's future during its financial difficulties in 2019. As president and player, he publicly appealed for community support after the club accumulated debts exceeding $120,000, emphasising its importance in providing sporting opportunities for disadvantaged members of the local community.

Club chairman Glenn Russell was named Clubs SA Volunteer of the Year for 2025, recognising his longstanding contribution to the club and its community sporting programs.

=== Kilburn Speedway ===
Kilburn Speedway operated from 1946 to 1951 on a reserve adjoining Churchill Road. Developed by organiser Rocky Marshall, the venue hosted motorcycle and motor racing, attracting prominent competitors including Jack Brabham, Jack Young and Vic Duggan.

The venue hosted the Australian Sidecar Championship in February 1950. A commemorative plaque at Jack Watkins Reserve recognises the speedway's history and the contributions of its organisers, competitors and supporters.

== Heritage listings ==
Kilburn has a number of heritage-listed sites, including:

- Churchill Road: Islington Railway Workshops Chief Mechanical Engineer's Office
- Churchill Road: Islington Railway Workshops Fabrication Shop
- Churchill Road: Islington Railway Workshops Foundry
- Churchill Road: Islington Railway Workshops Apprentice School
- Churchill Road: Islington Railway Workshops Electrical Shop
- Churchill Road: Islington Railway Workshops Fabrication Shop Annex
- 498 Churchill Road: Tubemakers Administration Building No. 2
- 500 Churchill Road: Tubemakers Administration Building No. 1

== See also ==
- List of Adelaide suburbs
