= Medindie, South Australia =

Medindie
- Suburb
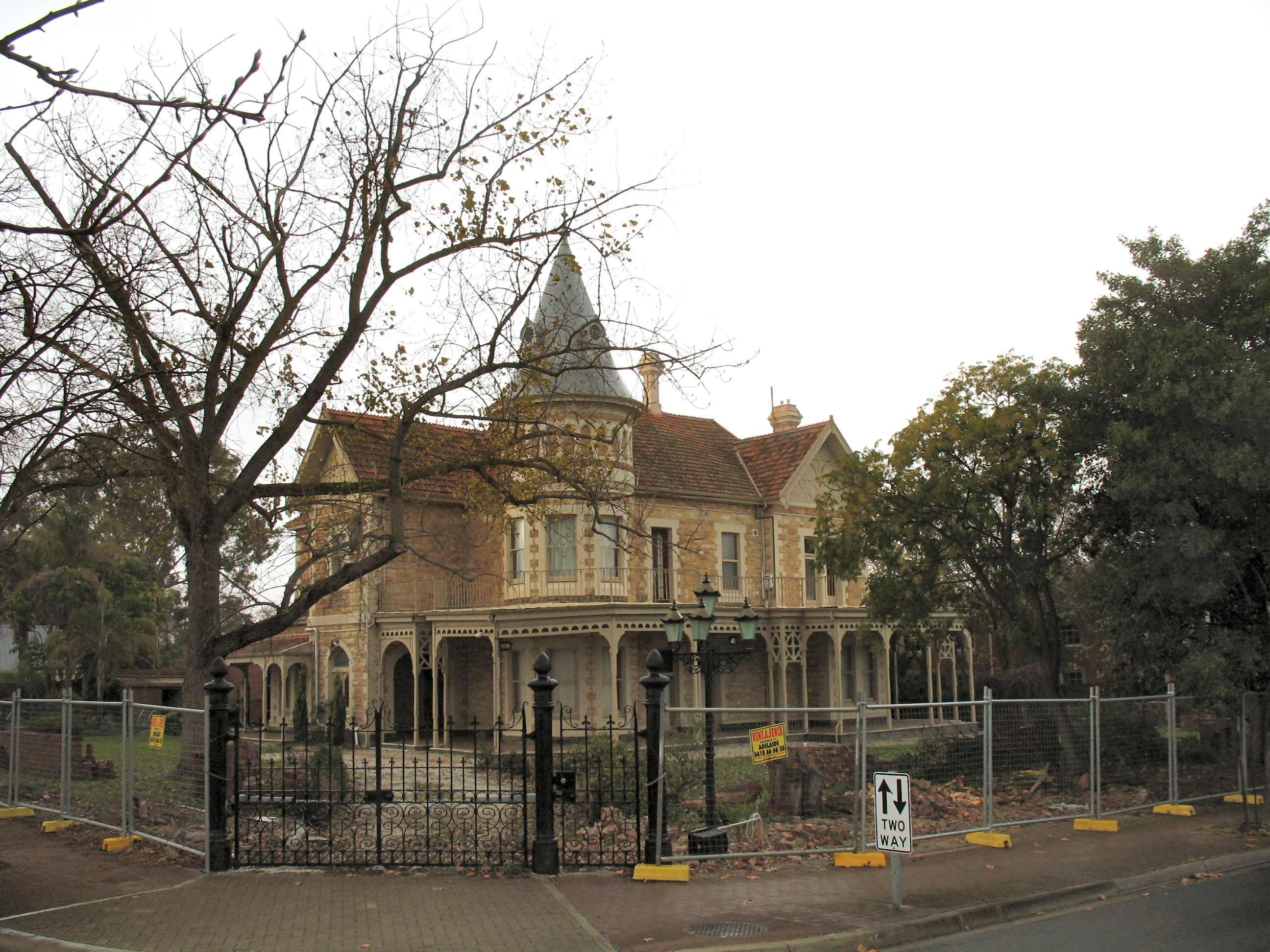
- Victorian home in Medindie

- Interactive map of Medindie
- Coordinates: 34°53′46″S 138°36′18″E
- Country: Australia
- State: South Australia
- City: Adelaide
- LGA: Town of Walkerville

Government
  - State electorate: Adelaide
  - Federal division: Adelaide

Population
  - Total: 1,175 (SAL 2021)
- Postcode: 5081
Suburbs around Medindie
Prospect	Medindie Gardens	Collinswood
Thorngate	Medindie	Walkerville
North Adelaide parklands	North Adelaide parklands	Gilberton

Medindie (formerly also known as Medindee or Medindi) is an inner northern suburb of Adelaide the capital of South Australia. It is located adjacent to the Adelaide Park Lands, just north of North Adelaide, and is bounded by Robe Terrace to the south, Northcote Terrace to the east, Nottage Terrace to the north and Main North Road to the northwest.

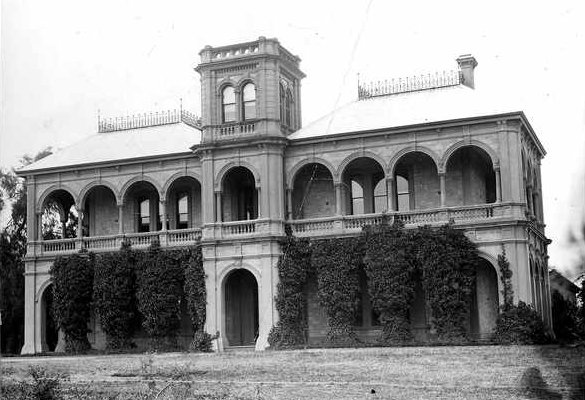
"The Briars" on Briar Avenue, Medindie, in 1910

The upper class suburb is mainly residential and contains many fine homes, and a number of historic mansions: "Willyama", (the Aboriginal name for Broken Hill), at 12 The Avenue was named so by Charles Rasp, the boundary rider who pegged a mining claim that became Broken Hill, after he bought it in 1887 from Oscar Görger, a local doctor/surgeon; "The Briars" at 15 Briar Avenue, built for George Hawker in 1856, is now the McBride Hospital; and there are many fine houses along Robe Terrace.

In 1884 the Brown sisters established a school on Mann Terrace on the north east fringe of North Adelaide. The school moved to Northcote Terrace north of the current location in 1885 and to its current address at 30 Northcote Terrace in 1893. Initially called the Medindie School and Kindergarten, it acquired the designation of Wilderness School in 1918. It is now a girls-only private school.

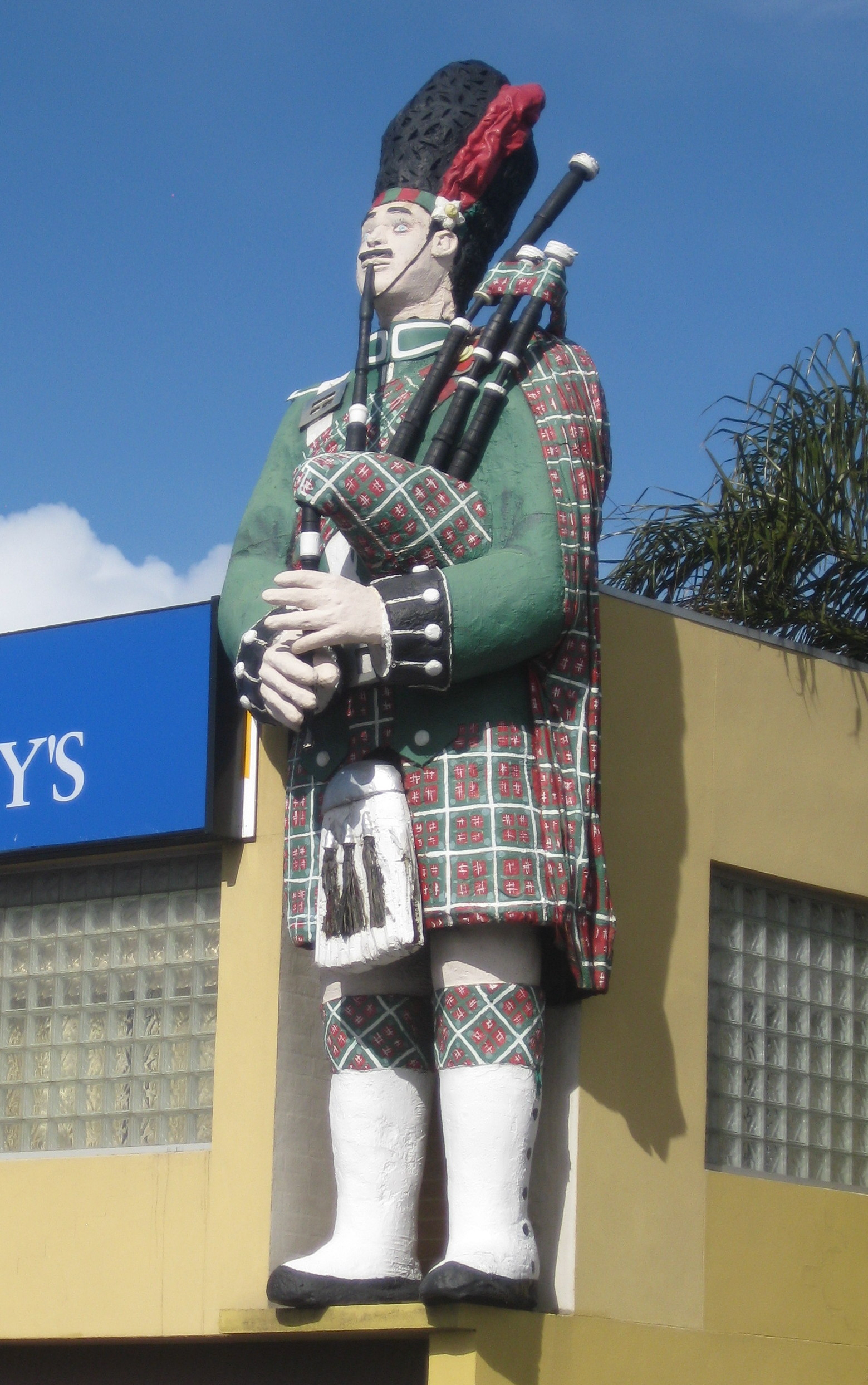
Scotty's Motel, an Adelaide landmark at Scotty's Corner on the northern edge of Medindie

Medindie's median property sale price in the June quarter of 2010 was $1,657,000. The suburb regularly ranks with the highest median sale price in the South Australian Real Estate Institute's quarterly sales statistics. The top sale price in the 12 months to 21 March 2012 was $2,350,000 for a 4 bedroom house on Dutton Terrace.
