= Town of Walkerville =

Coordinates: 34.9°S 138.616667°E

- Local government area
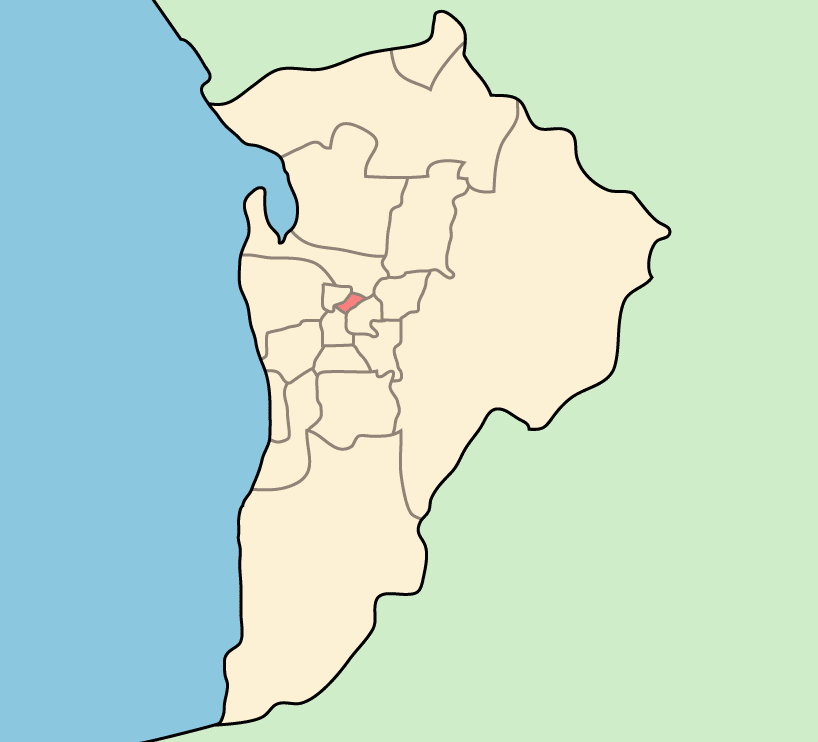

- Interactive map of Town of Walkerville
- Country: Australia
- State: South Australia
- Region: Eastern Adelaide
- Established: 1944
- Council seat: Gilberton

Government
  - Mayor: Melissa Jones
  - State electorate: Adelaide, Torrens
  - Federal division: Adelaide, Sturt

Area
  - Total: 3.57 km^{2} (1.38 sq mi)

Population
  - Total: 8,023 (LGA 2021)
  - Density: 2,247.34/km^{2} (5,820.6/sq mi)
- Website: Town of Walkerville
LGAs around Town of Walkerville
| City of Prospect | City of Port Adelaide Enfield | City of Port Adelaide Enfield |
| City of Prospect | Town of Walkerville | City of Norwood Payneham St Peters |
| City of Adelaide | City of Adelaide | City of Norwood Payneham St Peters |

The Corporation of the Town of Walkerville (or Town of Walkerville) is a small local government area in the central suburbs of Adelaide, South Australia.

The residents of the Town of Walkerville are represented by a mayor and eight councillors. The area is home to the highest concentration of top earners in South Australia, and was named "South Australia's richest postcode" in 2016.

== History ==
The District Council of Walkerville was first proclaimed on 5 July 1855, severing the area from the District Council of Yatala after a petition by local residents proclaimed a desire to break away from the larger District Council of Yatala (proclaimed in 1853). Initially, only the suburbs of Walkerville and Gilberton seceded from Yatala but within a few months, Medindie and North Walkerville (now part of Walkerville proper, east of Fuller Street) were annexed by Walkerville. The district boundaries remained unchanged until 1970 when Vale Park was annexed from the City of Enfield.

Early council meetings were held in a room at the local pub, the Sussex Arms. In 1893 the council seat moved across Stephen Terrace to the present location by the Walkerville Town Hall on Walkerville Terrace, Gilberton.

It was granted corporate town status on 1 October 1944, becoming the Town of Walkerville.

== Suburbs ==
- Gilberton (5081)
- Medindie (5081)
- Vale Park (5081)
- Walkerville (5081)

== Council ==
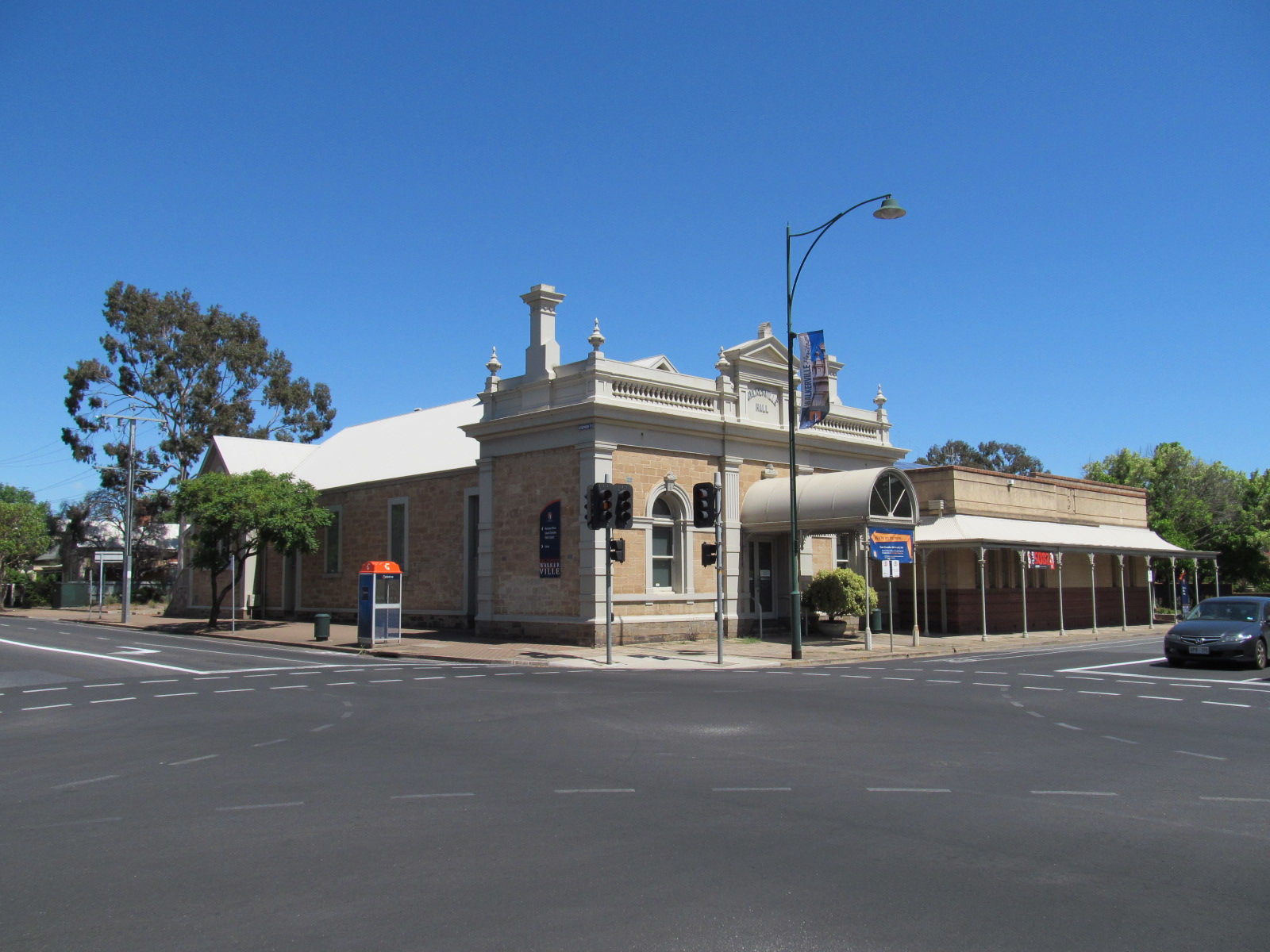
The council chambers of the Town of Walkerville

The council, and the councillors' registered interests, as of December 2022 are:

| Ward | Party | Councillor |
|---|---|---|
| Mayor | Liberal | Melissa Jones |
| Deputy Mayor | Independent | Liz Trotter |
| Area Councillors | Independent | Aman Kaur |
| Area Councillors | Independent | Anthony Vanstone |
| Area Councillors | Independent | James Nenke |
| Area Councillors | Independent | James Williams |
| Area Councillors | Independent | Jay Allanson |
| Area Councillors | Independent | John Zeppel |
| Area Councillors | Liberal | Steven Rypp |

== Mayors (formerly chairmen) of Walkerville ==
Before 1939, the known mayors are:

- JT Mellor (1906), appointed to the Municipal Tramways Trust
- Alfred Thiele (1935-1937)
- Louis David Waterhouse (1937-1938)

The following table lists the mayors from South Australian Government Gazettes, LGA reports and Mayoral biographical articles:

| Name (Birth–Death) | Portrait | Tenure | | Council Constituency | Elections | Mayoral Elections |
|---|---|---|---|---|---|---|
| John Creswell (1891-1975) | | 7 August 1939 | 8 July 1944 | Walkerville; 1934-1961 | 1934, 1936, 1938, 1940, 1942, 1944, 1943, 1944; 1946, 1947, 1951, 1953, 1955, 1957, 1959 | 1939, 1940, 1941, 1942 |
| Frank Wilson (1884-1969) | | 24 July 1944 | 7 July 1946 | North Walkerville; 1936-1956 | 1942, 1944, 1946, 1948, 1950, 1952, 1954 | 1955 |
| George Shaw (1883-1954) | | 8 July 1946 | 3 July 1948 | Walkerville; 1933-1945 | 1933, 1935, 1937, 1939, 1941, 1942, 1943, 1944; 1946, 1947 | 1946 |
| Frederick Rungie (1885-1966) | | 3 July 1948 | 7 July 1951 | Medindie; 1941-1948 | 1941, 1943, 1945, 1946, 1947, 1948, 1949 | 1948 |
| Howard Dayman (1893-1957) | | 7 July 1951 | 2 July 1955† | Walkerville; 1945-1957† | 1945, 1946, 1948, 1950, 1951, 1953, 1955, 1956 | 1951, 1953 |
| Frank Wilson (1884-1969) | | 2 July 1955 | 7 July 1956 | North Walkerville; 1936-1956 | 1942, 1944, 1946, 1948, 1950, 1952, 1954 | 1955 |
| Cecil Searle (1890-1967) | | 7 July 1956 | 1 July 1961 | North Walkerville; 1953-1956 | 1953, 1956, 1959 | 1956, 1959 |
| The Honourable; Lancelot Milne (1915-1995) | | 1 July 1961 | 4 July 1964 | Medindie; 1961-1965 | 1961, 1963 | 1961, 1963 |
| Ernest Phillipson (1911-2001) | | 4 July 1964 | 2 July 1966 | Medindie; 1962-1964; 1966-1974 | 1962, 1964, 1966, 1968, 1970, 1972 | 1964 |
| Leonard Ewens (1910-1981) | | 2 July 1966 | 5 July 1969 | Medindie; 1958-1962; 1964-1966; Gilbert; 1969-1970 | 1958, 1960, 1964, 1966, 1968, 1969 | 1966, 1968 |
| Edwin Scales (1903-1987) | | 5 July 1969 | 2 July 1977 | Gilbert; 1958-1969; Medindie; 1977-1979 | 1958, 1960, 1962, 1964, 1966, 1968, 1970, 1971, 1972, 1973, 1974, 1975, 1976, 1977 | 1969, 1970, 1971, 1972, 1973, 1974, 1975, 1976 |
| Kenneth Price (1921-2008) | | 2 July 1977 | 2 October 1982 | Medindie; 1975-1977; 1982-1990 | 1975, 1977, 1979, 1982, 1985, 1987, 1989 | 1977, 1979 |
| George Sparnon (1923-2000) | | 2 October 1982 | 2 May 1987 | Walkerville; 1965-1982 | 1965, 1966, 1968, 1970, 1971, 1972, 1973, 1974, 1975, 1976, 1977, 1979, 1982, 1985 | 1982, 1985 |
| Margot Vowles (born c.1949) | | 2 May 1987 | 4 May 1991 | Gilbert; 1978-1987; 1991-2000 | 1978, 1979, 1982, 1985, 1987, 1989, 1991, 1993, 1995, 1997 | 1987, 1989 |
| Ian McBryde (1928-2005) | | 4 May 1991 | 6 May 1995 | Medindie; 1979-1981; Walkerville; 1987-1991; 1995-1997 | 1979, 1987, 1989, 1991, 1993, 1995 | 1991, 1993 |
| Rosemary Craddock (born c.1950) | | 6 May 1995 | 6 May 2000 | Medindie; 1989-1995 | 1989, 1991; 1993, 1995, 1997 | 1995, 1997 |
| John Rich | | 6 May 2000 | 10 November 2006 | Gilbert & Medindie; 1995-2000 | 1995, 1997; 2000, 2003 | 2000, 2003 |
| David Whiting (born 1950) | | 10 November 2006 | 18 November 2010 | Vale Park; 1993-2018 | 1993, 1995; 1997, 2000, 2003, 2006, 2010, 2014 | 2006 |
| Heather Wright (born 1944) | | 18 November 2010 | 7 April 2014 | Vale Park; 2005-2014 | 1993, 1995; 1997, 2000, 2003, 2006, 2010, 2014 | 2006 |
| ACTING; Anthony Reade (1942-2021) | | 7 April 2014 | 8 November 2014 | Vale Park; 1997-2014 | 1997, 2000; 2003, 2006, 2010 | (Acting) |
| Raymond Grigg (born 1941) | | 8 November 2014 | 19 November 2018 | | 2014 | 2014 |
| Elizabeth Fricker (born 1962) | | 19 November 2018 | 12 November 2022 | Walkerville; 2014-2022 | 2014, 2018 | 2018 |
| Melissa Jones (born 1977) | | 12 November 2022 | present | | 2022 | 2022 |

=== Lance Milne (1961-1964) ===
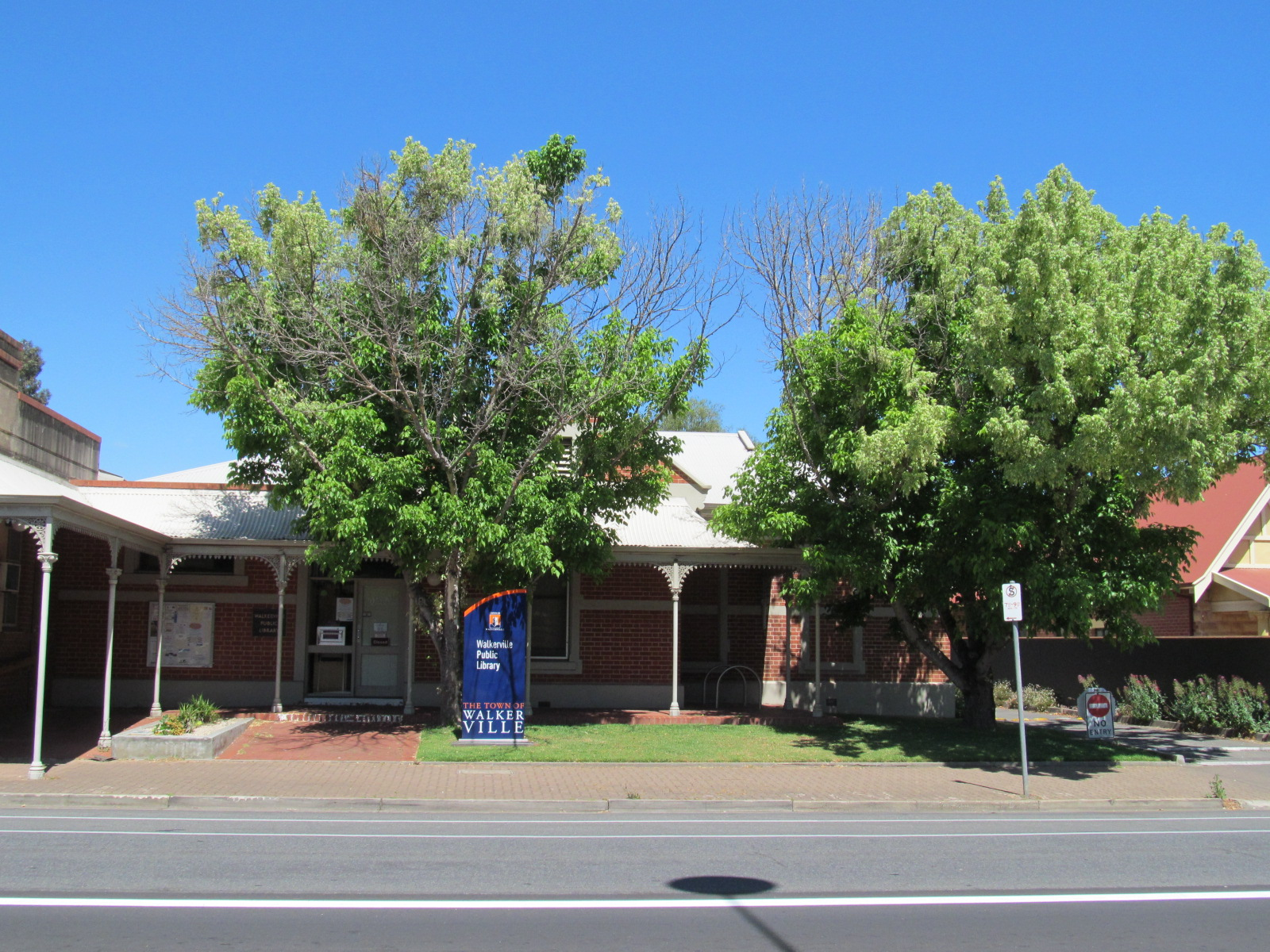
Milne championed the establishment of the original Walkerville Library (demolished 2016)

Flight Lieutenant Kenneth Lancelot Milne CBE (16 August 1915 – 27 December 1995) was elected to the Council of the Town of Walkerville in July 1961 and was immediately elected mayor. His term began on 1 July 1961 and ended on 4 July 1964. Milne defended the Trams that extended into suburban Adelaide and wished for them to be preserved for cultural significance. Also during his time on the council, Milne initiated action for a free public library in Walkerville and campaigned for the establishment of the town's YMCA Youth Centre.

Milne joined the Labor Party in the mid-1960s and supported the party in the 1966 Australian federal election. He resigned from the Walkerville council in December 1965 when he was appointed the Agent-General of South Australia in London by Premier Frank Walsh. Milne held many positions in the 1960s and 1970s, including President of the Municipal Association, Chairman of the Local Government Act Revision Committee, member of the Municipal Tramways Trust and Chairman of the State Government Insurance Commission. In December 1970, when the prospects of the United Kingdom joining the European Union started to grow greater, Milne said "If more countries go into the Common Market, it will start the gretatest war ever seen," later comparing the common market to the Roman Empire, stating that both would eventually become rich and subject to external pressures. When his term as South Australian Agent-General ended in 1971, he was made a Freeman of London.

=== Ernest Phillipson (1964-1966) ===
Captain Ernest Charles Phillipson (31 August 1911 – 22 September 2001) was born in August 1911 to Ernest Phillipson and Adelaide Constance Phillipson (nee Connor), who were both immigrants to South Australia. He served in the Australian military from 1938 to 1945 and married Kathleen Mary Powell (3 April 1916 – 7 May 2008) on 4 July 1940. During his early life, Phillipson was a farmer. Before and after the War, he was the Manager of the Airways Department at S.S. Coy Ltd., Adelaide.

In 1954, Phillipson was elected to the Council of the Town of St. Peters (in the modern day the City of Norwood Payneham & St Peters) for the Stepney ward. After serving on the council for 8 years, he announced he would resign his position at the upcoming elections in 1962. He was elected to the Walkerville Council while his term as a councillor at the Town of St. Peters was de facto still active. In the Walkerville Council elections of June 1962, Phillipson was elected as an Alderman for the Medindie Ward. Phillipson was a member of most of the council committees and the chairman of many. In the next bi-annual elections, he was elected to the vacant office of mayor, replacing Lance Milne, who later became involved in South Australian politics at the state level. He resigned after only one term as mayor in 1966 and was re-elected to the Medindie Ward in 1966, 1968, 1970 and 1972 before he retired from the council at age 63 in April 1974.

After his retirement he was appointed by the Governor of South Australia to the Forestry Board of South Australia in 1975. His term was renewed in 1978 and expired on 31 December 1982. Phillipson died at his home in North Adelaide in September 2001 and was buried at Saint Judes Cemetery in Brighton in the Western Suburbs.

=== Leonard Ewens (1966-1969) ===
Leonard Thomas Ewens (11 April 1910 – 23 July 1981) completed a Diploma II in Commerce at the University of Adelaide in December 1929. He married Margaret Norah Dawson in February 1932.

He was appointed to the inaugural Architects Board of South Australia as registrar on 1 March 1940, at the same time as Guy Makin was appointed as chairman. Local architect Herbert Jory was one of six elected architects on the board.

Ewens served in the Australian Navy during WWII. He enlisted in August 1940 and was discharged in January 1946. Prior to joining the council, Ewens worked as a chartered accountant. Ewens was a member of the State Council of the Institute of Chartered Accountants from 1946–1957.

Ewens was elected to the Walkerville Council for the Medindie Ward in July 1958 (declared elected October 1958) in a supplementary election. He was mayor of the Town of Walkerville from his election in July 1966 to July 1969, when he retired and the 1969 council elections occurred. After losing the Medindie Ward, Ewens was later elected in a supplementary election to govern the Gilbert Ward for one term (1969–70). He did not re-contest the ward in the 1970 elections.

Ewens was Chairman of the Junior Red Cross from 1955-1960 and Honorary Treasurer from 1965–1973. Ewens and his wife Margaret represented the Australian Red Cross at the international conference in Tehran in 1973. He was later appointed a member of the Board of Management of the State Bank of South Australia. Ewens died in July 1981 and was buried in the Enfield Memorial Cemetery.

=== Ned Scales (1969-1977) ===
Lieutenant Edwin Charles Scales MBE (8 February 1903 – 28 May 1987) generally known as Ned Scales, was born in to Charles Albert Scales and Hannah Maud Berry (nee Berry). Scales attended St Peter's College and the University of Adelaide, passing English Literature & Geometry in 1919, and Physics in 1921. He married Millicent Barton Hack in 1933. Scales was fined for parking his car too far away from the curb in Brighton. He enlisted in the Australian Military in July 1942 and served during World War II in the 26 Motor regiment before being discharged in August 1945.

In July 1958, Scales was elected to the Town of Walkerville Council, representing the Gilbert ward. He was re-elected in the Gilbert Ward in 1960, 1962, 1964, 1966 and 1968. Scaled was elected Mayor of Walkerville in May 1969, with his term starting in July 1969, succeeding Leonard Ewens, who then took over the Gilbert Ward which Scales had vacated to take office.

During his term as mayor, suburbs around the council's area were developing. In April 1970, Vale Park was annexed from the Enfield Council and transferred to the Walkerville Council. This increased the number of people Scales presided over and created a new ward in the council, which elected 2 members bi-annually. He was chairman of the Finance Committee from 1969–1977. During his terms as councillor and mayor, Scales persistently worked towards more open spaces in the council area, and was the first chairman of the River Torrens Improvements Standing Committee. Scales was re-elected as mayor in 1970, 1971, 1972, 1973, 1974, 1975 & 1976. Throughout his career, he strongly opposed the amalgamation of the Town of Walkerville with others and defended the rights of smaller councils. After his term as mayor ended, Scales was elected to the council again as the member for the Medindie Ward in 1977 in a supplementary election to fill the vacancy left by Ken Price, who resigned after he was elected as mayor. He was re-elected once more to his constituency in 1978 before this retirement in 1979. On 12 June 1976 he was awarded Member of the Order of the British Empire (MBE) by Queen Elizabeth II. Scales was appointed to be a member of the County Board of the Metropolitan County District from February 1983 - February 1985. At that time Scales was living at 105 Church Terrace, Walkerville, which was demolished in 2016.

=== Ken Price (1977-1982) ===
Lieutenant Kenneth Bonamy Price (13 October 1921 – 22 January 2008) was born to Archibald Grenfell Price (28 January 1892 – July 1977) and Kitty Pauline Price (nee Hayward; 8 January 1893 – 27 February 1984). Scales attended St. Mark's College in Adelaide. In July 1950, Price was admitted to the South Australian Bar.

In July 1975, Price was elected to the Town of Walkerville Council, representing the Medindie ward. He was re-elected in the Medindie Ward in every election until he was elected Mayor of Walkerville in May 1977. He took office in July 1977, succeeding Edwin (Ned) Scales, who then took over the Medindie Ward which Price vacated to take office.

During Price's tenure, The eastern side of the council's area, especially the new side of Vale Park was mostly developed and the rate of change and development which had escalated in the 1950s and 1960s decreased. Many young couples started raising families in the area around this time. Price was elected as mayor again in 1978, 1979, 1980 and 1981. Price was re-elected as the Councillor for the Medindie Ward after his resignation as mayor beginning 1982. The Walkerville council switched from annual to bi-annual elections in 1982 (although in 1987 the pattern was altered again). Price was re-elected in 1984, 1986, 1987 and 1989. He retired mid-term in May 1990, triggering a special council election

=== George Sparnon (1982-1987) ===
George William Sparnon, OAM, (21 July 1923 – 19 October 2000) was born to Lionel George Sparnon (9 April 1898 – July 1984) and Tottie Florence Sparnon (nee Candy; 9 March 1897 – August 1988), who were both from the northeastern suburbs, being from Walkerville and Stepney respectively. Sparnon therefore had an ancestral link with the area. He attended a trade school in Adelaide and was the highest achieving Grade I student in English, arithmetic and drawing in 1940. In 1942 he won the Young Master Printers' award from the same school.

In September 1965, Sparnon was elected to the Walkerville Council, representing the Walkerville ward for the balance of term of a retired councillor. He was re-elected to the Walkerville Ward in every council election until he was elected Mayor of Walkerville. After briefly taking office as Acting Mayor in early 1982, Sparnon took office as official mayor in October 1982, succeeding Ken Price, who then took over the Medindie Ward.

During Sparnon's tenure the council's population started decreasing as more middle-aged families started maturing and the demographic of young children decreased. On 13 June 1988, Sparnon was awarded a Medal of the Order of Australia by Queen Elizabeth II.

=== Margot Vowles (1987-1991) ===
Margot Anne Vowles, OAM (born 1949) was born in Holbrook, New South Wales. She attended Holbrook Primary School in that suburb from 1955 to 1959, Woodstock School for Girls from 1960 to 1961, and Toorak College from 1962 until her graduation in 1965. She was the personal assistant to fashion icons Lillian Wightman and Georgina Weir in the mid 1960s. From 1970 she was personal assistant to Prue Acton for 2 years.

Vowles was elected to the Walkerville Council in 1978. She took office as Councillor for the Gilbert Ward on 1 July 1978. She was re-elected in every election until she left the council in 2000. She was elected the first female Mayor of the Town of Walkerville in 1987. She was re-elected in 1989.

Since her resignation from the council she has provided commentary regarding the merging of local councils, including Walkerville, in the Adelaide area. She describes herself as a freelance Property and Project Manager. She was awarded a Medal of the Order of Australia in June 2004 for service to local government and to the community of Walkerville. She was honoured by the Town of Walkerville when she was made an honorary 'Woman of Walkerville', and is now the Patron of this award.

=== Ian McBryde (1991-1995) ===
Ian Balfour McBryde (17 July 1928 – 22 December 2005) was born in July 1928 in Medindie. He attended schools in Adelaide. In 1975 he was the Chief Commissioner of Scouts in South Australia. On Australia Day 1978, McBryde was made a member of the Order of Australia for services to scouting. McBryde was an engineer prior to his joining of the council.

In July 1979, McBryde was elected to the Walkerville Council, representing the Medindie Ward. He did not seek re-election in 1981 but later was elected to the Walkerville Ward in 1987. He vacated this office and was elected Mayor of Walkerville in the May 1991 elections. He won the 1993 election and did not contest the office of mayor at the 1995 elections, instead serving one more term as the Walkerville Ward Councillor.

=== Rosemary Craddock (1995-2000) ===
Rosemary Hamilton Craddock (born 1950) was born in England in early 1950. She migrated to Adelaide during her childhood. Craddock joined the Walkerville Council in the 1989 elections, representing the Medindie Ward.

After being re-elected twice, Craddock was elected Mayor of the Town of Walkerville in 1995. She announced her resignation suddenly as mayor and a member of the council in April 2000.

After her retirement, Craddock has been active in the Walkerville area and been a commentator on council issues such as proposed amalgamations between the Walkerville and other metropolitan councils. No amalgamations have yet occurred. She was made a Member of the Order of Australia in January 2017.

=== John Rich (2000-2006) ===
John David Rich was elected to the council in 1995 for the Medindie/Gilberton ward. He was elected mayor in May 2000 after the resignation of Rosemary Craddock in April. She was interim mayor until the May elections.

Rich was re-elected as mayor in May 2003 but retired from the office of mayor and from the council altogether in the November 2006 Elections. This election was the first synchronized South Australian Local Government Elections. During Rich's second term as mayor, the Walkerville Terrace precinct was revitalised and the Walkerville Sports and Bowling Clubs were upgraded. Urban development increased slightly.

Rich was responsible for the major reconstruction of Hawkers Road and Herbert Street that took place in 2003. The western footpath on Ascot Avenue was replaced. On 1 January 2004, Stage 1 of the Town Centre redevelopment became active with opposition from residents, but the council maintained that without this redevelopment, the Town Centre would stop functioning as a business hub. The three-bin waste collection service began on 1 January 2004. 2005 was the 150th anniversary of Walkerville. Many celebrations were held.

== See also ==
- List of Adelaide parks and gardens
