= Prospect, South Australia =

Prospect
- Suburb
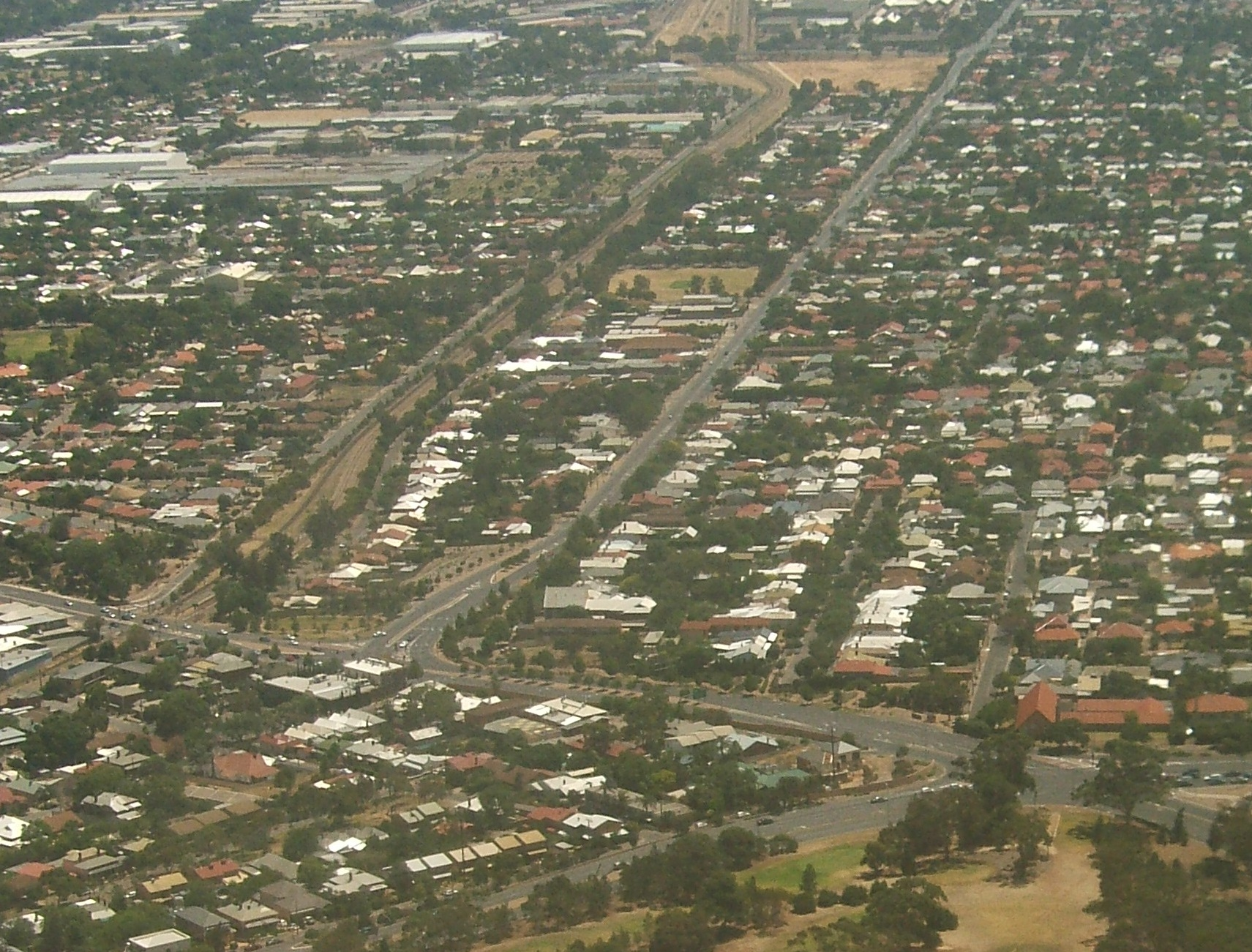
- The western side of Prospect facing north, bounded on the west by the railway line

- Interactive map of Prospect
- Country: Australia
- State: South Australia
- City: Adelaide
- LGA: City of Prospect

Government
  - State electorates: Adelaide; Enfield
  - Federal division: Adelaide

Area
  - Total: 5 km^{2} (1.9 sq mi)

Population
  - Total: 14,584 (SAL 2021)
- Postcode: 5082
Suburbs around Prospect
Regency Park	Kilburn; Blair Athol	Enfield
Dudley Park; Devon Park	Prospect	Nailsworth; Medindie Gardens
Ovingham	Fitzroy; Thorngate	Medindie

Prospect is an inner northern suburb of greater Adelaide, South Australia, and the namesake of its Local Government Area, the City of Prospect. It is located 5 km (3.1 mi) north of Adelaide's centre.

Surrounding suburbs include Kilburn, Fitzroy, Medindie and Devon Park. The suburb has boundaries of Main North Road to the east; Carter Street, Audley Avenue and Avenue Road to the south; The Gawler railway line to the west, and a line 400m north of Regency Road (Livingstone Avenue, Angwin Avenue and Henrietta Street) to the north.

Prospect comprises a large majority of the land area (about five-sevenths, or 71%) of the City of Prospect council area.

== History ==
John Bradford received a land grant for section 373 of the Hundred of Yatala on July 25, 1838, he subdivided it into several eight-acre allotments, according to H.C. Talbot, the area was named for its stunning views over the Adelaide Plains and its separation from North Adelaide by the beautifully wooded Parklands, filled with gum trees and wattles, the early Prospect Village was a private subdivision of sections 373 and 349 of the Hundred of Yatala, which intersected at the village centre (now St Helens Park and St Cuthbert's Anglican Church).

To the new settlers, the undeveloped locality presented a "beautiful prospect", being described as "well timbered, with waving gum and shady trees". Thus the early township was dubbed Prospect Village by Colonel William Light shortly after the colonisation of South Australia in 1838. The City of Prospect was established in 1872, formalising the name for local government and, in 1944, the city council voted to formally adopt the same name for the suburb which was the council seat itself.

The first Prospect Post Office opened around 1861 and closed around 1872. A Nailsworth office (open from 1861) was renamed Prospect in 1874 and has remained open since then. It was located at First avenue, Nailsworth, with two tall palm trees planted in front of the post office to enhance visibility from a distance.

=== Historic divisions ===
In the 1940s, the area now known as Prospect was separated into seven localities. West of Prospect Road, from north to south, were Prospect Estate, Highbury and Dudley Park (the west portion of the latter presently remaining a separate suburb). East of Prospect Road, from north to south, were Blair Athol (the name today for the old suburbs of Enfield Gardens and Bosworth Park, north of Prospect), Prospect Park, Prospect Hill, St Johns Wood and the old suburb of Prospect itself.

Several even older historic named subdivisions existed within the current suburb bounds around the turn of the twentieth century, according to an 1896 map of the Hundred of Yatala:

- Section 348 immediately south of the early Prospect Village was once known as Little Adelaide, reportedly laid out into lots by "Mr Tilly" in the late 1830s or early 1840s. It was subsumed by the early suburb of Prospect, but its southern neighbour, Fitzroy, presently remains a separate suburb.
- Section 371 (roughly present-day Rose Street up to Olive Street) was split into Prospect West on the west and Prospect North on the east.
- Further north in sections 369 and 352 lay Prospect Hill Extension, later subsumed by St Johns Wood and/or Prospect Hill, and Claraville.
- Immediately south of Regency Road lay Reepham, its name preserved in the present-day Reepham Hotel at Churchill Road corner, and Sleaford.
- The part of Prospect east of the railway line and west of present-day Churchill Road from Winter Terrace up to Regency Road was once considered to be part of Islington (originally section 376 in the Hundred of Yatala). This place name is preserved by the Islington railway station, the city-bound platform of which lies in Prospect. Present-day Regency Park, formerly "Tam O'Shanter Belt", to the west was home to the Islington sewage farm from 1881 to 1966.
- Immediately north of Regency Road in section 354, present-day Prospect's extreme north east, lay Enfield South and Dingley Dell. These were subsumed by Blair Athol.
- Immediately north of Regency Road section 367, in present-day Prospect's extreme north west, was a part of Tam O'Shanter East, Tam O'Shanter being an old name for the Regency Park area. This area became Prospect Estate.

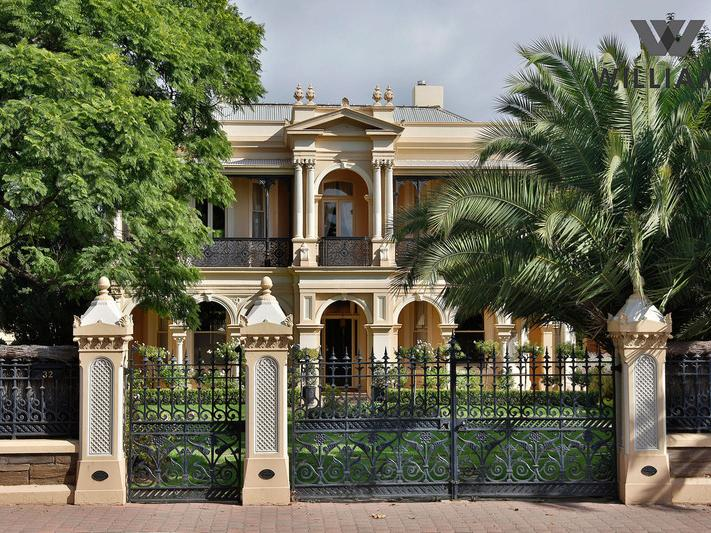
Audley House, a Victorian mansion at 32 Prospect Road on the southern border of Prospect, was built in 1885.

== Green spaces ==
Prospect is home to the Prospect Oval, a sports stadium located at Menzies Crescent. Larger parks in the suburb include the Soldier's Memorial Gardens, St Helens Park, the Prospect Estate Reserve and Barker Gardens. Smaller green spaces include St Johns Wood Gardens on the corner of Alpha Road and Main North Road, Percy Street Park, Dean Street Park on the corner of Barker Road, Bradford Park on Bradford Street, and Wilson Street Park on the corner of Highbury Street.

Soldier's Memorial Gardens is the largest park in Prospect. It has an open grass area and includes a playground, tennis courts and a performing stage for park events. Other features include sandpits, water features, a footbridge, a heritage shelter and the Prospect Community Garden.

St Helens Park, located on Prospect Road, has a playground, public barbecues, rose gardens and climbing trees. It is also accessible from the rear of the park via Koonga Avenue. The City of Prospect's Spring Fair was formerly held here for almost four decades.

Barker Garden is located on the corner of Alpha Road and Prospect Road and features a memorial for Australia soldiers, rose gardens and garden arches in the centre. It is popular for wedding ceremonies and light displays during the Christmas period.

St Johns Wood Reserve is located on the corner of Alpha Road and Main North Road. It is part of the historical St Johns Wood part of Prospect, formerly a separate suburb, named for the London suburb of the same name.

== Education ==
Prospect has several schools, including primary schools. Rosary School, a private Roman Catholic school from Reception to year 7, Prospect Primary School and Prospect North Primary School. Other schools include Blackfriars Priory School, an all boys private Roman Catholic school from early learning to year 12, and Prescott College, South Australia, a co-ed Seventh-day Adventist school from year 7 to 12.

== Notable people ==
- Rachel Sanderson

== See also ==
- List of Adelaide suburbs
- Electoral district of Prospect
- Prospect Road
