= Thorngate, South Australia =

Thorngate
- Suburb
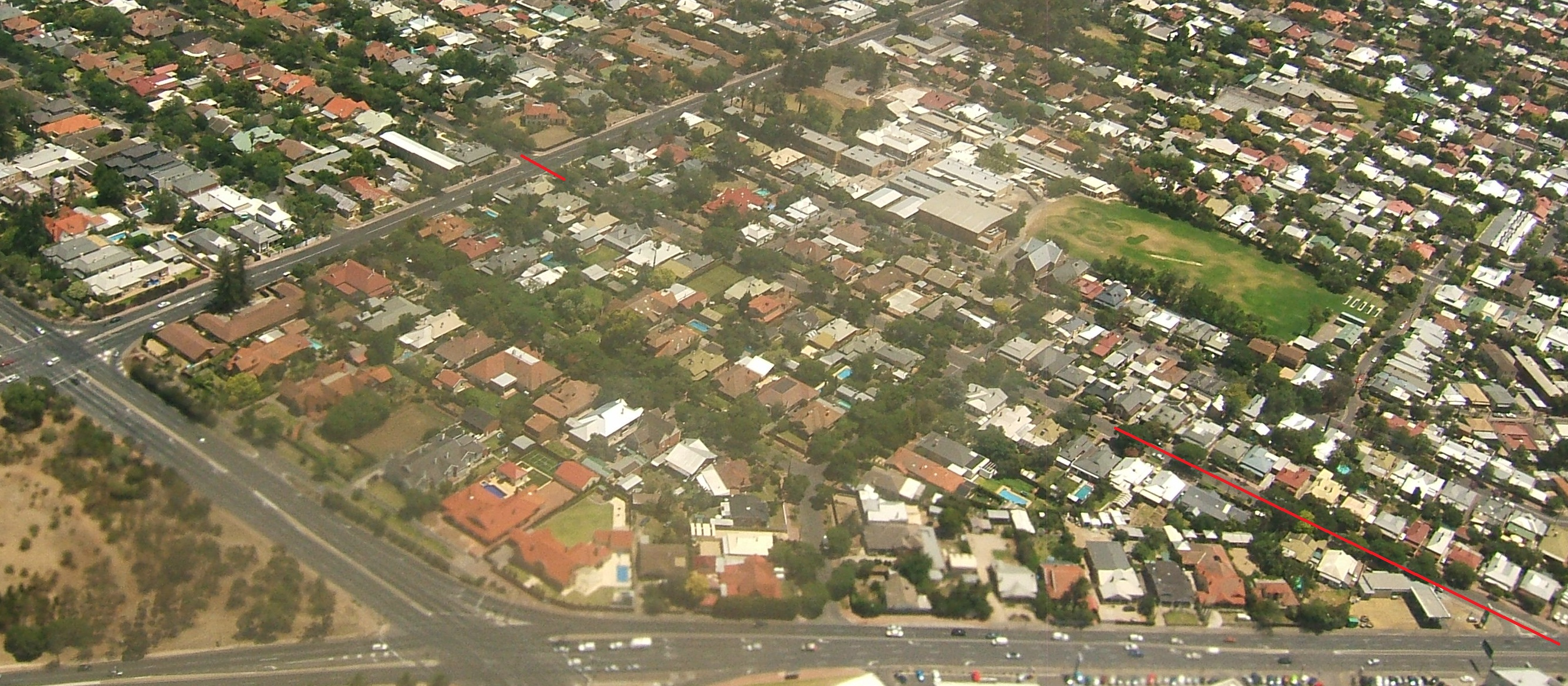
- The south-eastern side of Prospect facing northwest, bounded by major, local and collector roads, with the northern boarder marked (red).

- Interactive map of Thorngate
- Country: Australia
- State: South Australia
- City: Adelaide
- LGA: City of Prospect
- Location: 3.3 km (2.1 mi) N of Adelaide city centre
- Established: 1840

Government
  - State electorate: Adelaide
  - Federal division: Adelaide

Population
  - Total: 180 (SAL 2021)
- Postcode: 5082
Suburbs around Thorngate
Fitzroy	Prospect	Prospect
Fitzroy	Thorngate	Medindie
North Adelaide	North Adelaide	Medindie

Thorngate, an inner northern suburb of Adelaide, South Australia, falls within the City of Prospect. The suburb is mostly residential within a small area and has well established streets providing connectivity to greater metropolitan Adelaide.

Located just 3.3 kilometres from Adelaide's CBD and overlooking North Adelaide and the Adelaide Park Lands, Thorngate is considered one of South Australia's most desirable suburbs, and is also Adelaide's smallest.

== History ==
John Batty Thorngate (1795–1867) was a prominent landowner and philanthropist from Gosport, England. In 1840, he acquired 134 acres in South Australia under the Wakefield scheme, which included areas now known as Thorngate, Fitzroy, Medindie Gardens, and Ovingham.

With his brother William and friend Emanuel Churcher, Thorngate initiated mid-19th century charitable initiatives, including almshouses for vulnerable women in Gosport. The South Australian land was later subdivided and sold in 1910, supporting settlement and infrastructure in Adelaide's northern suburbs.

The suburb of Thorngate was named in his honour, reflecting his significant contributions as a landowner and his enduring philanthropic impact. Their legacy endures through the Thorngate Churcher Trust, which manages sheltered housing and care facilities for older people in Gosport.

== Geography ==
Thorngate is bounded to the north by Carter Street, to the south by Fitzroy Terrace, to the west by Prospect Road and to the east by Main North Road. All but Carter Street are major arterial roads, giving the suburb high connectivity to its surrounds.

The suburbs internal street network is minimal, encompassing just Churcher Street and Thorngate Street, dividing the suburb into only three blocks of houses.

== Demographics ==
Based on the 2021 Census, Thorngate had 180 residents, with 63.3% born in Australia, compared to South Australia's 71.5%. Notable communities included India (10.6%), Greece (3.3%), England (2.2%), and Iran (2.2%). Thorngate's age distribution was 19.3% aged 0-14 years, 61.4% aged 15-64 years, and 19.3% aged 65 and over, closely mirroring South Australia's averages.

Thorngate's ancestry differs from state trends, with English (31.7%), Australian (22.2%), Greek (14.4%), Italian (12.8%), and Indian (12.2%) as the most common. Statewide, English and Australian ancestries are more dominant, with smaller proportions of Greek and Indian backgrounds.

Thorngate residents have higher educational attainment compared to the state. Bachelor Degrees or higher are held by 42.5% of residents, compared to 22.7% statewide. Advanced Diplomas or Diplomas are held by 12.4% in Thorngate versus 8.6% statewide, highlighting the suburb’s highly educated population.

== Politics ==
Thorngate is represented by the South Australian House of Assembly in the District of Adelaide at the state level. At the federal level, it is represented by the House of Representatives in the Division of Adelaide.

== Transportation ==
=== Roads ===
Thorngate is serviced by Main North Road and Prospect Road, which link the suburb to both Adelaide city centre and the northern suburbs.

=== Public transport ===
==== Buses ====
The suburb is serviced by the following bus routes:

- G10
- 221, 222
- 224, 226F, N224
- 225
- 228
- 229
- 209F

== See also ==
- List of Adelaide suburbs
