= List of Adelaide obsolete suburb names =

This List of Adelaide obsolete suburb names gives suburb names which have been officially discontinued and their new names or the suburbs into which they were incorporated.

Earlier name	Renamed or incorporated into	Postcode	Notes
Ackland Gardens	Edwardstown	5039	
Aero Park	Albert Park	5014	
Albert Town	Alberton	5014	
Alberton East	Cheltenham	5014	
Alberton South (part)	Seaton	5023	
Alberton South (part)	Royal Park	5014	
Alderly	Semaphore	5019	
Aldgate North	Aldgate	5154	
Aldgate Valley	Aldgate	5154	
Alexander Park	Edwardstown	5039	
Amberleigh	Highbury	5089	
Athol Farm	Athol Park	5012	
Avenue Park	Cumberland Park	5041	
Ballara	Warradale	5046	
Balmoral	Semaphore Park	5019	
Bankside (part)	Torrensville	5031	
Bankside (part)	Underdale	5032	
Barton Vale	Enfield	5085	
Beaconsfield	Glengowrie	5044	
Beaumaris	South Brighton	5048	
Beefacres	Windsor Gardens	5087	
Bella Vista	Christies Beach	5165	
Berkeley	Brighton	5048	
Berkeley	North Brighton	5048	
Birkalla	Plympton	5038	
Black Forest Estate (part)	Black Forest	5035	
Black Forest Estate (part)	Clarence Park	5034	
Blackwood Park	Glenalta	5052	
Blakeney	Ottoway	5013	
Bonagh Estate	Windsor Gardens	5087	
Bosworth Park	Blair Athol	5084	
Bournemouth	Tennyson	5022	
Bowden-on-the-Hill	Ovingham	5007	First became part of Bowden, then part of Ovingham. See also Hillside.
Braebank	O'Halloran Hill	5158	
Braeville (part)	Kilburn	5084	
Brayville (part)	Plympton Park	5038	
Brighton Heights	Dover Gardens	5048	
Bristol	Semaphore Park	5019	
Broadview Gardens	Broadview	5083	
Broadway Estate	Glenelg East	5045	
Brompton Park	Brompton	5007	
Brookesville	Ottoway	5013	
Brooklyn	Osborne	5017	
Brownhill Creek	Kingswood	5062	
Burbank	Bedford Park	5042	
Burford Gardens	Dry Creek	5094	
Cabra	Cumberland Park	5041	
Camden	Camden Park	5038	
Carnarvon	West Croydon	5008	
Carnegie Park	Royal Park	5014	
Carrondown	Brompton	5007	
Caversham (part)	Beverley	5009	
Caversham (part)	Woodville South	5011	
Centennial Park	Pasadena	5042	
Challa Gardens	Kilkenny	5009	
Chandlers Hill	Aberfoyle Park	5159	
Charlesworth Park	Campbelltown	5074	
Cheltenham Gardens	Pennington	5013	
Chicago	Kilburn	5084	
Clairville	Campbelltown	5074	
Clairville North	Semaphore	5019	
Clofield	Rostrevor	5073	
Clovelly Gardens (part)	Clovelly Park	5042	
Clovelly Gardens (part)	St Marys	5042	
Cobham Gardens	Eden Hills	5050	
College Town	College Park	5069	
Corryton	Kensington Gardens	5068	
Cottonville	Westbourne Park	5041	(Note: Named for George Witherage Cotton, land agent and politician.)
Crest Alta	Belair	5052	
Cudmore Park (part)	Edwardstown	5039	
Cudmore Park (part)	Melrose Park	5039	
Culford or Cullford	Klemzig	5087	(Note: Properly Culford; probably named for Culford Park but name persists as Cullford Avenue, Klemzig.)
Cumberland	Cumberland Park	5041	
Cummins Park	Novar Gardens	5040	
Da Costa Park	Glenelg East	5045	
Darley	Paradise	5075	
Davington	Semaphore Park	5019	(Note: Inferred from names of streets (Bower Road, Kellett Street, West Street, John Street).)
Dockside	Rosewater	5013	
Dockville	Port Adelaide	5015	
Dover	South Brighton	5048	
Dover Heights	Dover Gardens	5048	
Draper	Taperoo	5017	
Dundas	Wingfield	5013	
Dunleath Gardens (part)	Glenelg East	5045	
Dunleath Gardens (part)	Glengowrie	5044	
Dunluce Estate	Brighton	5048	
Dunrobin (part)	Brighton	5048	
Dunrobin (part)	Warradale	5046	
Durham	Para Vista	5093	
East Adelaide	St Peters	5069	
East Marden	Campbelltown	5074	
East Park	Kent Town	5067	
East Payneham	Tranmere	5073	
Eastville	Ottoway	5013	
Elgin	Woodville Park	5011	(Note: Elgin persists as Elgin Street, Woodville Park.)
Elizabeth Fields	Davoren Park (part)	5113	
Elizabeth West (part)	Davoren Park (part)	5113	
Elizabeth West (part)	Edinburgh North	5113	
Ellenville	Richmond	5033	
Elmwood	Marion	5043	
Emu Downs	Morphett Vale	5162	
Enfield Gardens	Blair Athol	5084	
Enfield Heights (part)	Clearview	5085	
Enfield Heights (part)	Enfield	5085	
Enfield North	Enfield	5085	
Enfield Park	Enfield	5085	
Eton Park	Payneham	5070	
Everton	Pennington	5013	
Farnham	Peterhead	5016	
Felixstow Gardens	Felixstow	5070	
Finchley	Magill	5072	
Finchley Park	Magill	5072	
Findon Park (part)	Seaton	5023	
Findon Park (part)	Findon	5023	
Findon South	Flinders Park	5025	
Finsbury Park	Woodville North	5012	
Fisherville (part)	Birkenhead	5015	
Fisherville (part)	Exeter	5019	
Flagstaff Gardens	Darlington	5047	
Folkestone (part)	Marion	5043	
Folkestone (part)	Seacliff	5049	
Forbes	South Plympton	5038	
Forest Gardens	Forestville	5035	
Franklin	Cheltenham	5014	
Freemanton / Fremanton ?	Torrensville	5031	
Fulham Park	Lockleys	5032	
Fullarton Estate	Fullarton	5063	
Galway	Netherby	5062	
Galway Estate	Lockleys	5032	
Galway Gardens	Marleston	5033	
Gawler Heights	Gawler East	5118	
Gaza	Klemzig	5087	
Glanville Blocks	Semaphore Park	5019	
Glanville Hall	Semaphore South	5019	
Glenburnie (part)	Mitcham	5062	
Glenburnie (part)	Torrens Park	5062	
Glenburnie Estate	Mitcham	5062	
Gleneagles	Seaton	5023	
Glenrest	Rostrevor	5073	
Glynde Road Estate	Tranmere	5073	
Golflands	Glenelg North	5045	
Goodwood South	Clarence Park	5034	
Grangeville	Seaton	5023	
Grassmere	Kurralta Park	5037	
Graymore	Glenelg North	5045	
Graytown	Rosewater	5013	
Grosvenor Park	Plympton	5038	
Grovene	Glenelg East	5045	
Guildford Park	Gillman	5013	
Halton Gardens	Kensington Park	5068	and Halton Terrace is now The Parade.
Hamilton	Vale Park	5081	
Hamilton Park	Warradale	5046	
Hamilton Vale	Vale Park	5081	
Hamley	Peterhead	5016	
Hamley Extension	Peterhead	5016	
Hammersmith	Edwardstown	5039	
Hampstead	Hampstead Gardens	5086	
Harbor Blocks	Queenstown	5014	
Harcourt Gardens	South Plympton	5038	
Hardwyke	Ottoway	5013	
Harrowville	St Peters	5069	Fifth and Sixth Avenues
Hayhurst	Plympton	5038	
Helmsdale	Glenelg East	5045	
Hemmington	Thebarton	5031	
Hemmington West	Thebarton	5031	
Henley Park	Thebarton	5031	
Highbury	Prospect	5082	
Hillcrest Gardens	Hillcrest	5086	
Hillside	now part of Ovingham	5082	Proposed as alternative name for Bowden-on-the-Hill;
Hilton West	Torrensville	5031	
Holden Park	Woodville West	5011	
Hollywood	Cumberland Park	5041	
Holmesdale	St Morris	5068	
Home Park	Magill	5072	
Horsnells Gully	Magill	5072	
Hull	Wingfield	5013	
Islington (part)	Kilburn	5084	
Islington (part)	Prospect	5082	
Islington Gardens	Kilburn	5084	
Joyce Park	Hawthorn	5062	
Kelmscott	Rosewater	5013	
Kew	Semaphore South	5019	
Kinedana (part)	Eden Hills	5050	
Kinedana (part)	St Marys	5042	
Kingston	Rosewater	5013	
Kingston East	Rosewater	5013	
Kingsnorth	Rosewater	5013	
Kingswood Park	Kingswood	5062	
Kirkcaldy	Henley Beach	5022	
Knightsbridge	Leabrook	5068	
Knoxville (part)	Glenside	5065	
Knoxville (part)	Glenunga	5064	
Kobandilla	Klemzig	5087	
Koongarra Park	Magill	5072	
Kooyonga	Lockleys	5032	
Largs Bay North	Largs North	5016	
Laurel Park	Croydon Park	5008	
Lindisfarne	Valley View	5093	
Little Adelaide	Prospect	5082	
Little Chicago	Kilburn	5084	
Little Queenstown (part)	Hendon	5014	
Little Queenstown (part)	Royal Park	5014	
Lochiel Park	Campbelltown	5074	
Lourdes Valley	Myrtle Bank	5064	
Marden West	Marden	5070	
Maringa	Marino	5049	
Meadowside	Campbelltown	5074	
Mellor Park (of 1879)	Semaphore Park	5019	(Note: Two distinct subdivisions were named Mellor Park, 42 years apart, by father and son. The Semaphore Park subdivision was named by J. F. and T. F. Mellor in 1879; the Lockleys subdivision by J. W. Mellor (son of J. F. Mellor) in 1920.)
Mellor Park (of 1920)	Lockleys	5032	
Melrose Park	Edwardstown	5039	
Middle Brighton	Brighton	5048	
Millswood Estate	Millswood	5034	
Minories	Port Adelaide	5015	
Mirreen	Edwardstown	5039	
Mitcham Park	Daw Park	5041	
Mitcham West	Lower Mitcham	5062	
Monreith	Toorak Gardens	5065	
Mornington	Plympton	5038	
Morphettville Park	Morphettville	5043	
Mortlock Park	Colonel Light Gardens	5041	
Mount Lofty (part)	Crafers	5152	
Mount Lofty (part)	Stirling	5152	
Murray Park	Magill	5072	
Netley	North Plympton	5038	
Newark	Wingfield	5013	
New Glenelg	Glenelg South	5045	
New Hindmarsh	West Hindmarsh	5007	
New Kingston	Gillman	5013	
New Mile End	Mile End	5031	
New Parkside	Unley	5061	
New Queenstown	Hendon	5014	
New Thebarton	Torrensville	5031	
Newenham	Paradise	5075	
Newstead	St Morris	5068	
Newton Gardens	Athelstone	5076	
Newton Heights	Athelstone	5076	
North Kensington	Beulah Park	5067	
North Norwood	Trinity Gardens	5068	
North Richmond	Richmond	5033	
North Unley	Unley	5061	
North Walkerville	Walkerville	5081	
Northam	Kilburn	5084	
Northcote	Tennyson	5022	
Northgate	Blair Athol	5084	
Nunyara	Belair	5052	
Oaklands	Oaklands Park	5046	
Oaklands Estate	Marion	5043	
Oldfield	Rostrevor	5073	
Olive Farm	Broadview	5083	
Osborneville	Osborne	5017	
Paddington	Rosewater	5013	
Panchito Park	Torrens Park	5062	
Panorama Park	Reynella	5161	
Paradise Park (part)	Paradise	5075	
Paradise Park (part)	Rostrevor	5073	
Paringa Park	Somerton Park	5044	
Peachey Belt	Penfield	5121	
Peckham	Tranmere	5073	
Pendleton	Blair Athol	5084	
Penhryn	West Richmond	5033	
Perth	Rosewater	5013	
Pine Forest	Kilburn	5084	
Plymouth	Semaphore	5019	
Portland	Port Adelaide	5015	
Prospect Estate	Prospect	5082	
Prospect Gardens	Prospect	5082	
Prospect Park	Prospect	5082	
Ramsgate	Tennyson	5022	
Rayleightown	Greenacres	5086	
Reade Park (part)	Daw Park	5041	
Reade Park (part)	Colonel Light Gardens	5041	
Reade Park Gardens	Cumberland Park	5041	
Redfern	Cumberland Park	5041	
Reedbeds (part)	Fulham	5024	
Reedbeds (part)	Lockleys	5032	
Reedbeds (part)	Underdale	5032	
Reedbeds (part)	West Beach	5024	
Reepham	Prospect	5082	
Ridge Park	Myrtle Bank	5064	
Rosatala (part)	Rosewater	5013	
Rosatala (part)	Rosewater	5013	
Rosebery	Collinswood	5081	
Rosefield (part)	Fullarton	5063	
Rosefield (part)	Highgate	5063	
Roseville	Gillman	5013	
Rosewater Gardens	Pennington	5013	
Rosslyn	Wingfield	5013	
Rostrevor Park	Rostrevor	5073	
Rugby	Payneham	5070	
Saint Annes Estate	Somerton Park	5044	
St Bernards	Rostrevor	5073	
St James Park	Clapham	5062	
St Johns Wood	Prospect	5082	
St Leonards	Glenelg North	5045	
St Marys West	Edwardstown	5039	
San Remo	Somerton Park	5044	
Sandwell (part)	Birkenhead	5015	
Sandwell (part)	Peterhead	5015	
Sassafras	Ottoway	5013	
Scarborough (part)	Semaphore	5019	
Seacombe	Seacliff Park	5049	
Seascape	Semaphore Park	5019	
Seaton Gardens	Seaton	5023	
Seaton North	Seaton	5023	
Seaton Park	Seaton	5023	
Sherwood Estate	Glenalta	5052	
Shirley Gardens	Felixstow	5070	
Silver Sands	Aldinga Beach	5173	
Slapes Gully	Burnside	5066	
Sleeps Hill	Lynton	5052	
Snowdens Beach	Largs Bay	5016	
Somerlea	Somerton Park	5044	
South Richmond	Marleston	5033	
South Road Estate	St Marys	5042	
South Road Gardens	Clovelly Park	5042	
South Road Park	Clovelly Park	5042	
South Scarborough (part)	Semaphore	5019	
South Welland	Welland	5007	
Southend	Tennyson	5022	
Southwark	Thebarton	5031	Reinstated as Southwark in 2025
Springbank	Panorama	5041	
Springbank Gardens	Pasadena	5042	
Stradbrook	Rostrevor	5073	
Strathmont	Gilles Plains	5086	
Sun Valley	Glenalta	5052	
Swansea	Largs North	5016	
Sydenham	Paradise	5075	
Tam O'Shanter	Regency Park	5010	
Tam O'Shanter Belt	Ferryden Park	5010	
Tenterdon	Woodville South	5011	(Note: Tenterdon was a more common spelling than Tenterden or Tenterton, though the name persists as Tenterden Street in Woodville South and Tenterden House (on the site of what is now the carpark to the Queen Elizabeth Hospital was also named for the suburb.)
The Parks	Angle Park	5010	
The Tiers	Crafers	5041	
Thorndon Park	Newton	5074	
Thornton	Ethelton	5015	
Tonsley Park	Clovelly Park	5042	
Twickenham	West Richmond	5033	
Twickenham Gardens	West Richmond	5033	
Upper Kensington	Leabrook	5068	
Upper Mitcham (part)	Kingswood	5062	
Upper Mitcham (part)	Torrens Park	5062	
Urrbrae Park	Urrbrae	5064	
Vermont	South Plympton	5038	
Vista View	Hope Valley	5090	
Warradale Park	Warradale	5046	
Washington Gardens	Myrtle Bank	5064	
Waverley Ridge	Crafers	5041	
Waymouth	Semaphore	5019	
Weeeroopa (part)	Brooklyn Park	5032	
Weeeroopa (part)	West Richmond	5033	
West Adelaide	Mile End	5031	
West Hilton	Torrensville	5031	
West Marden	Marden	5070	
West Sturt	Coromandel Valley	5051	
West Thebarton (part)	Thebarton	5031	
West Thebarton (part)	Torrensville	5031	
White Park	Lockleys	5032	
Windsor	Windsor Gardens	5087	
Wolseley	West Croydon	5008	
Woodforde	Magill	5072	
Woodforde Heights	Rostrevor	5073	
Woodlands Park	Edwardstown	5039	
Woodley	Glen Osmond	5064	
Woodville Estate	Woodville Park	5011	
Yatala	Rosewater	5013	
Yatala East	Pennington	5013	
York	Beverley	5009	

== Sources ==
- Directory of South Australia, 1962. Adelaide: Sands and McDougall, 1962; p. A21
- UBD Street Directory (Adelaide) 1993, p.8–p.10. Universal Press Ltd.

== See also ==
- List of Adelaide suburbs
- Local government areas of South Australia
- List of Adelaide railway stations
