= Portrush Road =

Road in Adelaide, South Australia

Portrush Road Hampstead Road, Taunton Road, Ascot Avenue, Lower Portrush Road South Australia
- Coordinates: 34.847298°S 138.617375°E (North end); 34.963398°S 138.644006°E (South end)

General information
- Type: Road
- Location: Adelaide
- Length: 13.7 km (8.5 mi)
- Route number(s): A17 (2017–present)
- Former route number: National Highway A17 (1998–2017)

Major junctions
- North end: Briens Road; Northfield, Adelaide
- Grand Junction Road; North East Road; Payneham Road; Greenhill Road; Glen Osmond Road; Cross Road
- South end: South Eastern Freeway; Glen Osmond, Adelaide

Location(s)
- Region: Northern Adelaide, Eastern Adelaide
- Major suburbs: Clearview, Broadview, Manningham, Marden, Payneham, Norwood, Glenside

Portrush Road is a major arterial route through the eastern suburbs of Adelaide, the capital of South Australia. This name covers many consecutive streets and is not widely known to most drivers except for the southernmost section, as the entire allocation is still best known as by the names of its constituent parts: Hampstead Road, Taunton Road, Ascot Avenue, Lower Portrush Road, and Portrush Road proper. Formerly, there were also sections known as Kensington Terrace and Wellington Road. This article will deal with the entire length of the corridor for sake of completion, as well to avoid confusion between declarations. Portrush Road (including all its constituent roads) is designated route A17.

== Route ==
The Portrush Road corridor runs north–south through Adelaide's eastern and south-eastern suburbs, to the foot of the Adelaide Hills at its southern end. From its intersection with Grand Junction Road in Northfield, it runs south as Hampstead Road through to Manningham, where it turns southeast into Taunton Road to intersect with North East Road, changing name to Ascot Avenue and continuing southeast, crossing the River Torrens and changing name again to Lower Portrush Road, before intersecting with Payneham Road. It continues south as Portrush Road through Adelaide's inner eastern suburbs to eventually terminate with the western end of the South Eastern Freeway in Glen Osmond.

Portrush road carries approximately 36,000 vehicles per day, including heavy freight trucks. It is an authorised route for trucks up to 26 metres (85 ft) B-double and 25 metres (82 ft) vehicle carrier size. Along with Grand Junction Road, Portrush Road constitutes a major heavy road transport route through suburban Adelaide from Port Adelaide to the South East of South Australia and the adjacent state of Victoria.

== History ==
Portrush Road was named by Nathaniel A. Knox after Portrush in Northern Ireland. Knox owned land near the intersection with Greenhill Road, in the area now occupied by the suburbs of Glenunga and Glenside.

In a 1949 street directory, the southern end of Portrush Road had its current route to Kensington Road. North of Kensington Road, it took the name Kensington Terrace, then Wellington Road north of the Magill Road intersection to Payneham Road. What is now Lower Portrush Road (including the bridge over the River Torrens) did not exist at all. Ascot Avenue was a minor street running off of North East Road which did not exactly line up with Taunton Road on the other side of North East Road. The nearest bridge over the River Torrens was the Felixstow Bridge on Felixstow Road, which is now O.G. Road. Lower Portrush Road and the bridge across the Torrens was opened in November 1970.

Had the Metropolitan Adelaide Transport Study of the 1960s progressed, a Hills Freeway would have been constructed to link the South Eastern Freeway to the Port of Adelaide. This would have subsequently removed the freight that utilises Portrush Road today.

== Major intersections ==
LGA	Location	km	mi	Destinations	Notes
Port Adelaide Enfield	Gepps Cross–Northfield–Clearview tripoint	0.0	0.0	Briens Road – Para Hills, Salisbury East	Northern terminus of Hampstead Road and route A17
Port Adelaide Enfield	Gepps Cross–Northfield–Clearview tripoint	0.0	0.0	Grand Junction Road (A16) – Port Adelaide, Gepps Cross, Hope Valley	
Port Adelaide Enfield	Broadview–Greenacres–Manningham tripoint	2.8	1.7	Regency Road – Kilkenny, Prospect; Muller Road – Hampstead Gardens	
Port Adelaide Enfield–Prospect boundary	Broadview–Manningham boundary	3.8	2.4	Hampstead Road (south) – Collinswood	Name change: Hampstead Road (north), Taunton Road (southeast)
Port Adelaide Enfield–Walkerville boundary	Manningham–Vale Park boundary	4.1	2.5	North East Road (A10) – North Adelaide, Modbury, Houghton	Name change: Taunton Road (northwest), Ascot Avenue (southeast)
River Torrens		5.1	3.2	Ascot Bridge	
Norwood Payneham & St Peters	Marden	5.3	3.3	O-Bahn Busway	
Norwood Payneham & St Peters	Marden–Payneham border	6.3	3.9	Payneham Road (A11) – Adelaide CBD, Campbelltown, Hope Valley	Name change: Lower Portrush Road (northwest), Portrush Road (south)
Norwood Payneham & St Peters–Burnside boundary	Maylands–Trinity Gardens–Beulah Park–Norwood quadripoint	8.3	5.2	Magill Road (B27) – Norwood, Magill, Norton Summit, Lobethal	
Norwood Payneham & St Peters–Burnside boundary	Beulah Park–Kensington–Norwood	9.0	5.6	The Parade – Norwood, Kensington Park, Auldana	
Norwood Payneham & St Peters–Burnside boundary	Kensington–Marryatville–Norwood–Toorak Gardens quadripoint	9.7	6.0	Kensington Road – Adelaide CBD, Wattle Park	
Burnside	Toorak Gardens–Tusmore–Linden Park–Glenside quadripoint	11.0	6.8	Greenhill Road (B26) – Adelaide CBD, Wayville, Uraidla, Balhannah	
Burnside–Unley–Mitcham tripoint	Glen Osmond–Myrtle Bank–Urrbrae tripoint	13.7	8.5	Glen Osmond Road (A1 northwest) – Adelaide CBD; Cross Road (A3 west) – Plympton, Unley Park; South Eastern Freeway (M1 southeast) – Mount Barker, Murray Bridge	Southern terminus of Portrush Road and route A17
Route transition
