= Adelaide–Mannum Road =

Road in South Australia

Adelaide–Mannum Road Northcote Terrace, North East Road, Torrens Valley Road, Randell Road, Adelaide Road South Australia
- Coordinates: 34.901890°S 138.609218°E (West end); 34.915459°S 139.309864°E (East end)

General information
- Type: Road
- Length: 78.7 km (49 mi)
- Route number(s): A10 (1998–present) (Gilberton–Houghton); B10 (1998–present) (Houghton–Birdwood); B35 (1998–present) (Tungkillo–Palmer); B36 (1998–present) (Palmer–Mannum)

Major junctions
- West end: Mann Road; Park Road; North Adelaide
- Ascot Avenue; Grand Junction Road; Hancock Road; Lower North East Road; South Para Road; Onkaparinga Valley Road; Reedy Creek Road; Mannum Road
- East end: Adelaide Road; Mannum, South Australia

Location(s)
- Region: Eastern Adelaide, Adelaide Hills, Murray and Mallee
- Major suburbs: Klemzig, Modbury, Houghton, Chain of Ponds, Gumeracha, Birdwood, Tungkillo, Palmer

Adelaide–Mannum Road is a road that runs through the northern Adelaide Hills between the South Australian capital, Adelaide and Mannum on the Murray River. It is designated route A10 in the metropolitan area and B10 in rural areas, and is 79 kilometres (49 mi) in length. This name covers many consecutive streets and is not widely known to most drivers, as the entire allocation is still best known as by the names of its constituent parts: Northcote Terrace, North East Road, Torrens Valley Road, Randell Road and Adelaide Road. This article will deal with the entire length of the corridor for sake of completion, as well to avoid confusion between declarations.

== Route ==
Northcote Terrace starts at the intersection of Robe Terrace and Park Road/Mann Road in North Adelaide, about 500 metres away from the beginning of Adelaide's O-Bahn Busway, changes name to North East Road a kilometre later to become a major arterial road that travels, as its name suggests, through the north-eastern suburbs of Adelaide. It continues through Adelaide's north-east growth corridor, through to the suburban region of Houghton, where it meets in an intersection with Lower North East Road, leading back to Adelaide's more easterly suburbs. Just beyond Millbrook Reservoir, the road changes name to Torrens Valley Road and continues east, then just east of Birdwood turns off to become Randell Road, continuing east until it reaches the western edges of Mannum, where it changes name for the final time to Adelaide Road.

== History ==
The road was first built in the 1840s to facilitate the growth and development of the towns and settlements along its length. It played a role in the gold rush of the 1860s. Today, the area boasts many tourist and historical sites, wineries and natural attractions, although only a few towns exist as more than historical sites.

== Major intersections ==
LGA	Location	km	mi	Destinations	Notes
Walkerville	North Adelaide–Medindie–Gilberton tripoint	0.0	0.0	Mann Road (n/bound)/Park Road (s/bound) (R1 south) – Adelaide	Western terminus of road and route A10
Walkerville	North Adelaide–Medindie–Gilberton tripoint	0.0	0.0	Robe Terrace (R1 west) – Adelaide, Port Adelaide	No right turn southbound into Robe Terrace
Walkerville	North Adelaide–Medindie–Gilberton tripoint	0.0	0.0	Walkerville Terrace (northeast) – Gilberton	
Walkerville–Port Adelaide Enfield border	Gilberton–Collinswood border	1.0	0.62	Nottage Terrace (west) – Prospect; Stephen Terrace (southeast) – St Peters	Name transition: Northcote Terrace (south), North East Road (northeast)
Walkerville–Port Adelaide Enfield border	Vale Park–Manningham border	2.6	1.6	Taunton Road (A17 northwest) – Northfield; Ascot Avenue (A17 southeast) – Glen Osmond	
Port Adelaide Enfield	Greenacres–Hampstead Gardens–Klemzig tripoint	4.5	2.8	Muller Road – Prospect, Kilkenny	
Tea Tree Gully	Modbury–Holden Hill–Gilles Plains–Valley View quadripoint	8.8	5.5	Grand Junction Road (A16) – Port Adelaide, Gepps Cross, Houghton	
Tea Tree Gully	Modbury	10.2	6.3	McIntyre Road (A18) – Parafield, Paralowie	
Tea Tree Gully	Ridgehaven–St Agnes–Tea Tree Gully tripoint	14.3	8.9	Hancock Road (A11) – Golden Grove, Salisbury Heights	
Adelaide Hills	Houghton	19.3	12.0	Lower North East Road (A16) – Port Adelaide, Gepps Cross	Route transition: A10 west, B10 east
Adelaide Hills	Millbrook–Chain of Ponds border	27.1	16.8	Tippett Road (B31 north) – Campbelltown, Castambul	Concurrency of routes B10 and B31
Adelaide Hills	Chain of Ponds	27.5	17.1	South Para Road (B31 south) – Williamstown, Lyndoch	Concurrency of routes B10 and B31
Adelaide Hills	Chain of Ponds–Cudlee Creek–Gumeracha tripoint	29.9	18.6	Gorge Road – Cudlee Creek	Name transition: North East Road (west), Torrens Valley Road (east)
Adelaide Hills	Birdwood	40.0	24.9	Warren Road (B34 north) – Mount Crawford, Williamstown	Concurrency of routes B10 and B34
Adelaide Hills	Birdwood	41.8	26.0	Onkaparinga Valley Road (B34 south) – Mount Torrens, Bridgewater	Concurrency of routes B10 and B34
Adelaide Hills–Barossa border	Birdwood–Mount Pleasant border	46.2	28.7	Torrens Valley Road (B10 northeast) – Mount Pleasant, Nurioopta	Name transition: Torrens Valley Road (southwest), Randell Road (east); Route transition: B10 (southwest), unallocated (east)
Mid Murray	Tungkillo	51.6	32.1	Tungkillo Road (B35 north) – Mount Pleasant, Mount Crawford	Route transition: unallocated (west), B35 (east)
Mid Murray	Palmer	63.1	39.2	Reedy Creek Road (B35 south) – Murray Bridge	Route transition: B35 (south), B36 (east)
Mid Murray	Mannum	75.7	47.0	Ridley Road (north) – Angas Valley, Sedan; Mannum Road (B36 south) – Murray Bridge	Name transition: Randell Road (west), Adelaide Road (east); Route transition: B36 (south), unallocated (east)
Mid Murray	Mannum	78.7	48.9	Randell Street – Mannum	Eastern terminus of road
Concurrency terminus; Incomplete access; Route transition

== See also ==
- Highways in Australia
- List of highways in South Australia
