= Vale Park, South Australia =

Vale Park
- Suburb
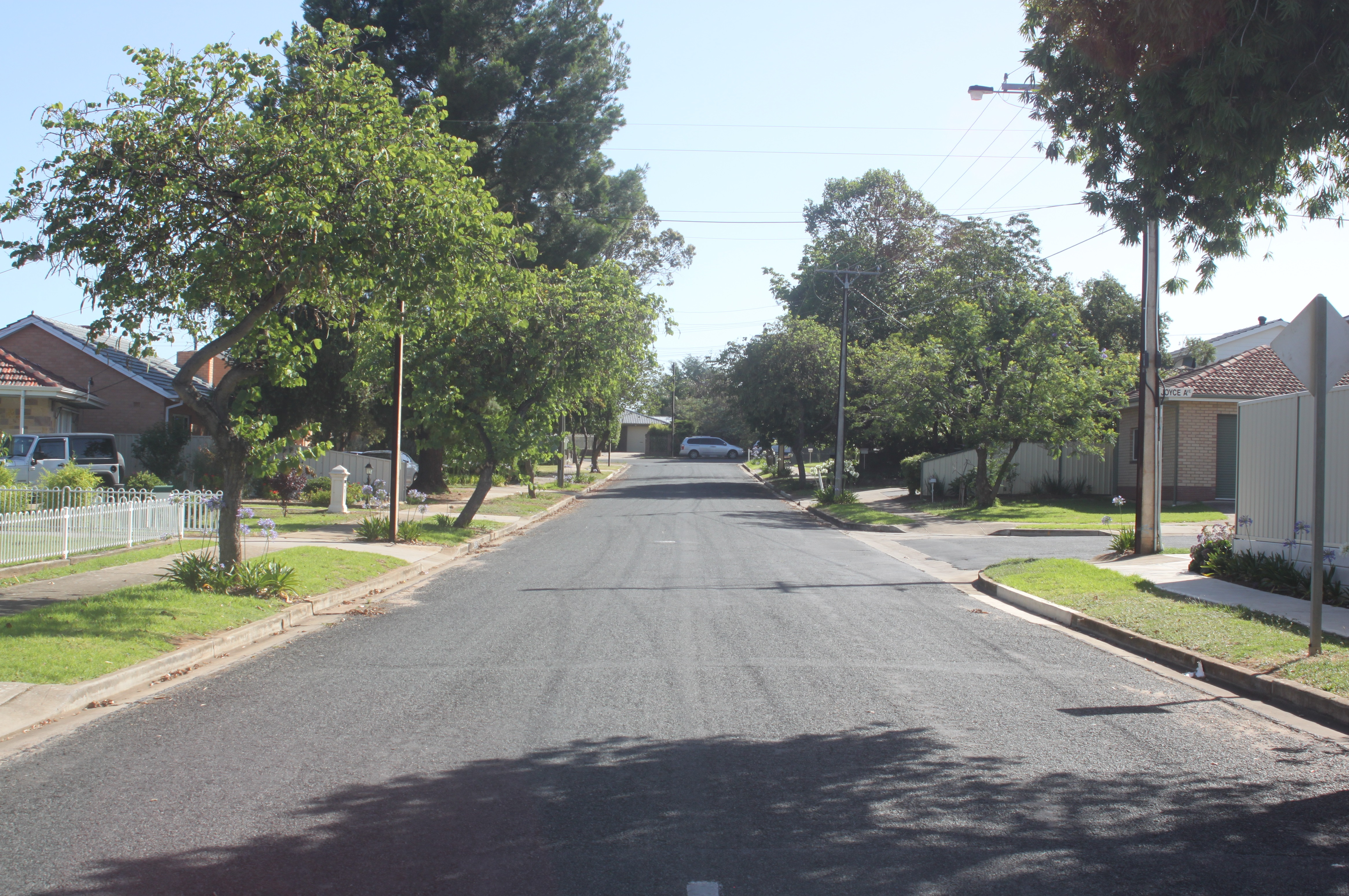
- View towards Vale Park

- Interactive map of Vale Park
- Coordinates: 34°53′15″S 138°37′28″E
- Country: Australia
- State: South Australia
- City: Adelaide
- LGA: Enfield (until July 1970) Walkerville (from July 1970)
- Location: 4 km (2.5 mi) NE of Adelaide
- Established: ~1840 (pastoral); ~1959 (residential)

Government
  - State electorate: Torrens
  - Federal division: Adelaide

Population
  - Total: 2,452 (SAL 2021)
- Postcode: 5081
Suburbs around Vale Park
Manningham	Hampstead Gardens	Klemzig
Broadview, Collinswood	Vale Park	Klemzig
Walkerville	Royston Park	Marden

Vale Park is a suburb of Adelaide in the Town of Walkerville, South Australia. It is located northeast of the Adelaide city centre between North East Road and the River Torrens, astride Ascot Avenue, part of the A17 highway which is the major eastern ring route bypass of Adelaide.

Vale Park was originally a private subdivision named after Vale House, the home of Philip Levi, a pastoral pioneer.

== History ==
Vale House, built c.1841

Vale Park had a slow development as an extension of the growth from Walkerville, and was known as North Walkerville. The eastern section of Vale Park (section 479) was originally known as Hamilton, after Robert Hamilton, who purchased the land from Robert Thomas. Thomas purchased the land in October 1838 and was a founder of the South Australian Gazette and Colonial Register. Thomas, who had multiple land holdings in the colony, used his country holdings for brick production. The subdivision involved the land between Ilford and Fife Streets, but despite allotments being advertised in 1839 for this section, the original subdivisions were unpopular because the land was thought to be too far from the city, and the area remained largely rural. Robert Hamilton was a publican in the city and purchased the section in 1842, after living in the Walkerville area for several years. He owned the first house built in the section: Hamilton House, built c.1840, which sat further up from the Torrens and was surrounded by orange groves. The house was demolished in c.Aug-Oct 2017. Hamilton was later declared insolvent and mentally ill; he was committed to the Adelaide Destitute Asylum. Bordering the property of George Fife Angas, Hamilton was home to a few farmers and gardeners, but its population was sparse; the suburb was laid out in 1939, but was not officially proclaimed until 1961. The largely rural area with scattered old homes and farmhouses supported market gardens, vineyards, almond fields and horse trotting tracks; these were the main uses of the land until its development the early 1960s.

The western side of current-day Ascot Avenue (section 478), although also settled early in the state's life, had a slow development. Sir John Morphett originally owned the section, but later settled at Cummins. Vale House was built around 1840, and still stands today next to its gatehouse, making it the oldest residential building in South Australia. Sold in 1841 by Morphett to Sarah August of the business syndicate August, Cooke & Co. the property was originally known as Syleham. The Cookes originated from British Honduras, and had owned a slave-run mahogany cutting business. After Cooke ran into financial trouble in 1843, the property was leased to the Surveyor-General, Colonel Frome, and later West End Brewery founder W.H. Clark. Clark purchased the property in 1850, and then Philip Levi settled there in 1858. His family owned the property until 1949, when it was bequeathed to the Walkerville Council. Historical figures associated with the property include Levi and his descendants, Sir Richard Chaffey Baker, George Downer, Edward Meade Bagot, and John Barker. The land was primarily settled by Philip Levi, an early pastoralist of South Australia. The former Levi property is located at the bottom of Lansdowne Terrace, adjoining the River Torrens. Further east of Levi's property was Vale Farm, on which stood the timber Manning House, surrounded by flower gardens, which was at one time the home of Colonel Frome. In the 1930s the area began to be associated with Willow Bend, a nearby poultry farm. Development began to increase in the early-to-mid 20th century, when allotments were advertised.

The modern suburb of Vale Park was developed throughout the late 1950s through to the early 1970s, in the Enfield Council area. The primary years of development were 1959–1962. In 1970, Ascot Avenue was constructed with a bridge across the River Torrens, replacing Lansdowne Terrace as the main thoroughfare, which changed the nature of the suburb, as it was effectively split in half, resulting in a distinct variance in the character of housing on both sides of the suburb, also in part because of the originally differing council boundaries. Today the land value in Vale Park is very high. Much of the original housing stock of the suburb has been undergoing demolition and renewal since the 2010s, with subdivisions of varying degrees occurring as a result of urban infill.

Many of the streets today bear the names of people associated with the history of the area. Hamilton Street is named after original landowner Robert Hamilton. Stanley Tonkin (5 June 1911 – 19 February 1986), a former carpenter, and his wife Joyce (26 November 1916 – 18 January 2007) farmed flowers (long-stem carnation and hyrdrangea), using them for events, as well as almonds. William Chase, a leathermaker (20 October 1873 – 17 June 1956) and his wife Eva (15 September 1876 – 24 September 1962) also grew almond trees. Redford Clisby (29 July 1867 – 1 February 1957) was a carpenter and joinery owner in Gilberton; he married Esther Davey (11 November 1873 – 16 August 1977) in 1894. Their househould was a bustling one; they owned a sewing machine and a piano, and Redford often sat around the piano singing hymns, while Esther, a seamstress, practised dressmaking. Redford was a popular local figure, who was often encouraged to run for public office and organisational administration roles, but always refused, instead wanting to focus on his family. Their seven children were all born at home, and Esther lived until the age of 103; though she accepted the progress of the area, she often said that 'she had been born too soon.' Edward Washington (11 January 1923 – 24 December 1984) was another market gardener in the area, and the family house still stands on Wallace Street. George Hutton Barnard (26 October 1806 – 11 August 1867) was a local pioneering scholar and musician, who at one point (~1837, 39) worked as Deputy Registrar at the Colonial Secretary's Office. He owned a homestead (Bardini Estate) near modern-day Bardini Street and Creswell Court in Gilberton. The property, at various times, contained vineyards, almond groves, and olive groves, from with Barnard's son attempted to begin an olive oil business. The Harris family owned Willow Bend, and cultivated a large almond field and fruit collection; one of the patriarch's daughters married Hugh Wallace (13 September 1897 – 1 December 1970). The Harris family house is heritage listed and lies on Ilford Street. The Webster family owned dairy-cattle fields, horse trotting tracks and a pony club. The Stewart family were market gardeners on the banks of the Torrens.

== Geography and Services ==
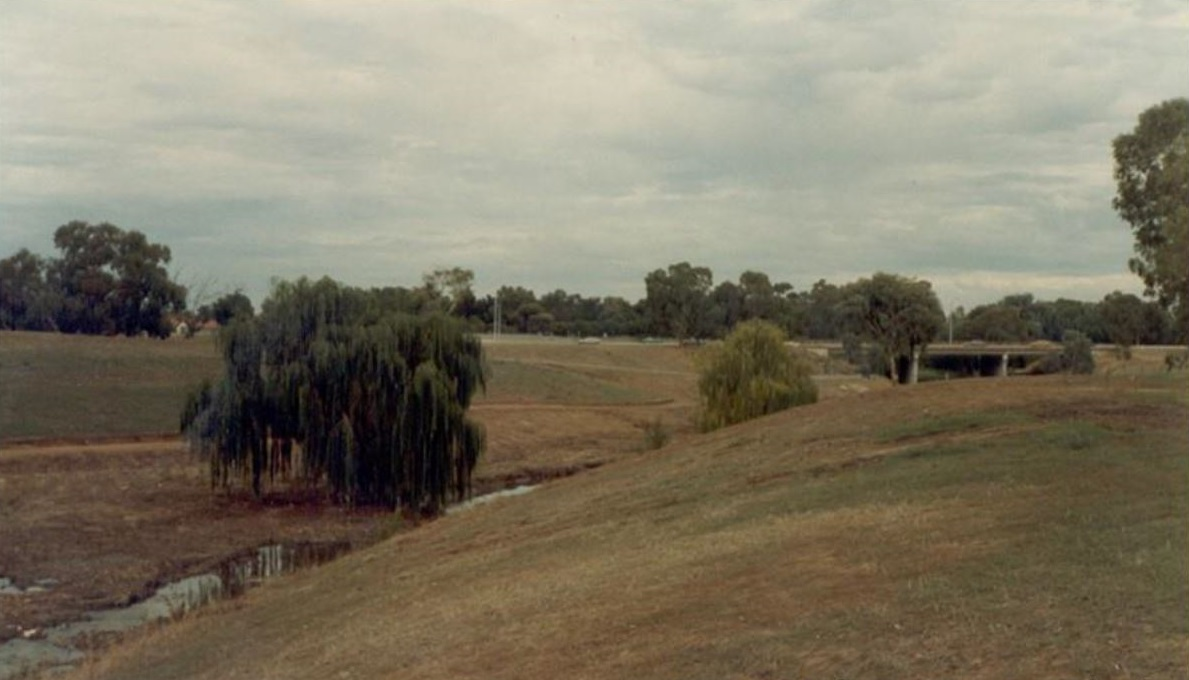
River Torrens at Vale Park, c.1970s

The part of the River Torrens between Ascot Bridge and the end of Fife Street was originally marshland caused by a sharp meander; to preserve the continuity of the government-owned reserve beside the river, later the site of the Adelaide O-Bahn and Torrens Linear Park, the river was artificially diverted in 1968–1969, and now forms a straight line between these points.

Vale Park Primary opened on 3 August 1964. As of 2023, 392 students were enrolled at the school. The main high school in the area was Marden High School, on Lower Portrush Road, which opened in 1971, but due to the falling student population in South Australia at the time, became an adult re-entry school only in 1992. As a result, the zoned high school became, and is still, Charles Campbell College, Paradise.

== Administration ==
Vale Park had lain in the Enfield Council area until it was annexed in July 1970 to Walkerville. In December 2020, after a councillor's motion, the Town of Walkerville began considering consultation for a suburban boundary realignment in the suburb. In 2021, it was proposed that the side of the suburb west of Ascot Avenue, be subsumed by Walkerville, and only the eastern side retained as Vale Park. This was put to public consultation in August 2022, but was rejected and abandoned by council on 17 October 2022.

The suburb has lain with the following electoral districts:

State-level:

- 1956–1970: Enfield
- 1970–1993: Gilles
- 1993–2002: Torrens
- 2002–2014: Norwood
- 2014–2018: Dunstan
- 2018–present: Torrens

Federal-level:

- 1949–1955: Sturt
- 1955–1969: Bonython
- 1969–1993: Adelaide
- 1993–2013: Sturt
- 2013–2019: Hindmarsh
- 2019–present: Adelaide

== See also ==
- List of Adelaide suburbs
