= Philip Squires =

Australian cricketer (1939–2022)

Personal information
- Full name: Philip Horley Squires
- Born: 18 June 1939; Marden, South Australia
- Died: 3 November 2022 (aged 83); McLaren Vale, South Australia, Australia
- Batting: Left-handed
- Bowling: Right-arm leg break

Domestic team information
- Years: Team
- 1962/63: South Australia
- Source: Cricinfo, 25 September 2020

Philip Horley Squires (18 June 1939 – 3 November 2022) was an Australian cricketer. He played in one first-class match for South Australia in 1962/63.

== See also ==
- List of South Australian representative cricketers
