= Cedar College =

R-12 christian school in Australia

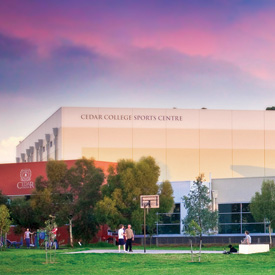
- Cedar College Sports Centre

Location
- 215–233 Fosters Road; Northgate, South Australia; Australia; 34°51′16″S 138°38′05″E

Information
- School type: A Reception to Year 12 Christian School
- Religious affiliation: Christian
- Established: 1997
- Principal: Tim Heading
- Colours: Green, red and gold
- Alumni name: COSA
- Website: www.cedarcollege.sa.edu.au

Cedar College is an R–12 co-educational Christian school situated in the suburb of Northgate, South Australia, 8 km north-east of the Adelaide CBD. Encompassing both primary school and high school, Cedar College caters for students from Reception (Foundation) through to Year 12.

== School motto and name ==
A distinctly Christian school, the Cedar College crest features the words "Growing in Wisdom" which reflects the desire of the school to encourage students to not only grow in academic knowledge, but also to develop the wisdom to use this knowledge in effective and God-honouring ways. It is derived from Psalm 92v12, which describes the growth of a cedar tree, becoming strong, vital and fruit-bearing. In the same way, the name 'Cedar College' was chosen to reflect the purpose of the College.

In 2014, Cedar College launched its new purpose statement: "Preparing students for real life", which reflects the desire of the school to equip each student for their life ahead, by helping them to "Discover Jesus, Display Love and Develop Self".

Cedar College is an inter-denominational Christian school and a ministry of CityReach Baptist Church Oakden (previously Oakden Baptist Church).

== History ==
Discussions regarding the establishment of a Christian school in the inner north-eastern suburbs of Adelaide first took place in May 1993. After three years of planning and preparation, Cedar College was officially opened on a newly acquired ten acre property in Northgate in 1997. Established initially as a Primary School with just 34 students, Cedar College grew rapidly under the leadership of its inaugural Principal, Peter Thomson, and soon opened the Middle School and Senior School campuses in the years that followed.

Cedar College opened a two-court sports stadium named the "Cedar College Sports Centre" in 2011. The centre was officially opened by the Hon. Kate Ellis MP, and has quickly become an important landmark and community facility in Northgate.

In 2013, the two-storey Cedar College Resource Centre and administration building was officially opened by the Hon. Christopher Pyne MP, Minister for Education. The Resource Centre features a distinctive triple-winged roof line, inspired by the historic Vickers Vimy aircraft flown by Sir Keith and Ross Smith from England to Australia in 1919, landing in the nearby Vickers Vimy Reserve. The Resource Centre is the new technology hub of the school, and adjoins the science wing, which was opened in 2014.

In 2016, during the school's 20th anniversary year, Cedar College completed a new two-storey Creative Arts Centre. The facility was officially opened by Senator the Hon. David Fawcett on behalf of Education Minister Senator the Hon. Simon Birmingham. The Creative Arts Centre features three classrooms and seven instrumental practice rooms on the ground floor with a music performance space, recording studios, drama performance space and theory classroom on the first floor.

During 2019, two of the original classrooms were demolished, to make way for a new science and learning support facility for the Primary School. The new, purpose-built facility, was opened in 2020.

In 2021, a new two-storey facility was opened in the High School, adjoining the Creative Arts Centre. This new building included new facilities for the ‘Canopy’ learning support program, as well as new High School classrooms. A further two classrooms were added to the Creative Arts facility during 2023.

In 2023, the School Board announced that Cedar's inaugural Principal, Peter Thomson, would be retiring by mid-2024. The Board began the search for a new Principal later that year, and announced in 2024 that it had appointed Mr Tim Heading as the new Cedar College Principal, commencing his role in Term 4, 2024.

== Departments ==
Cedar College is composed of four 'branches' – Junior Primary (R–2), Upper Primary (3-6), Middle School (7–9) and Senior School (10–12). These growing branches allow students to develop academically, spiritually, and socially, providing a College that offers a complete education from Reception through to Year 12.

With now close to 900 students, Cedar College is continuing to expand its facilities and curriculum, within a strong community environment.

== Alumni and Old Scholars Association ==
In 2012, Cedar College launched its official Alumni and Old Scholars Association publication "Branching Out", to celebrate five years of graduates from the school. In 2022, following the College's 25th year, the Alumni Association was formally named COSA (Cedar Old Scholars' Association).

== Service area ==
Situated 8 kilometres from the Adelaide CBD, amongst the growing suburbs of Lightsview and Northgate, Cedar College is in a suitable location for students in the North-Eastern suburbs of Adelaide, South Australia.
