= 5083 =

5083 may refer to:

- The year in the 6th millennium
- 5083 aluminium alloy
- 5083 Irinara, an asteroid
- A South Australian postcode for Broadview, South Australia and adjacent areas
