= James Philcox =

James Philcox (22 January 1812 – 31 March 1893) was an English land speculator and property developer in the 1840s and 1850s in the colony of South Australia. He is credited with naming the inner eastern Adelaide suburb of Marryatville as well as the outer northern suburb of Evanston. He returned to England to retire in Sussex in 1853.

== Early life ==
James Philcox was born in Burwash, Sussex, England, on 22 January 1812, of parents John and Esther. He married Ann Taylor Evans on 18 October 1838 in Burwash.

== Life in South Australia ==
Philcox, wife Ann and a child arrived in South Australia aboard the barque Fortitude on 5 April 1842, along with W.P. Auld, later a noted vigneron, and his family.

In February 1845 his name is listed in a petition, along with 1674 other "memorialists" who were opposing a plan to start transporting convicts to the new colony of South Australia. His address is shown as South Terrace, Adelaide.

"Jas. Philcox" is listed as passenger arriving on the brigantine Vanguard on 2 December 1845 from Sydney and Portland Bay. However records show James Philcox arriving on the barque Enmore, captained by Henry Wilmott, carrying 15 passengers from London, arriving in Port Adelaide on 15 January 1846. He is described as "Land and estate agent; Adelaide, The Croft North Adelaide". Among the other passengers were George Morphett and his family, also on a return journey to the colony. with his wife and children.

On 25 September 1848, Philcox purchased 20 acres (8.1 ha) adjacent to the land of George Brunskill who laid out the "Village of Marryatville". This followed an announcement in the press in July of the engagement of "Miss Marryat, niece of the Lord Bishop of Adelaide" to Sir Henry Young, the new governor of Adelaide, before their departure from England. The suburb's name thus came from Augusta Sophia Marryat, wife of the fifth Governor of South Australia.

His presence is noted at a kangaroo hunt with "the Adelaide Hounds" at Clarendon on 13 July 1849, as reported in The South Australian, 17 July 1849.

In 1850 Philcox named sections 3220 and 3221 in the Hundred of Munno Para, creating the town of Evanston, now an outer northern suburb of Adelaide. In 1853 a plan of the Evanston township was lodged at the Lands Title Office, when it was transferred to Sir John Morphett, elder brother of Philcox's friend George Morphett.

His name appears as a buyer and owner of many properties between 1852 and 1853, in the city of Adelaide and also in the County of Frome, near Mount Remarkable in the Flinders Ranges area. Various memorial records from the South Australian General Register Office show Philcox as "formerly of Adelaide but now of England 1851" (15/36); Burwash, Sussex, 1852 (439/42); formerly of Burwash, but now of Adelaide, 1852 (101/57).

On 4 April 1853 Philcox and his wife boarded the Shackamaxon, under Captain West and bound for Swansea and Liverpool. Also aboard was businessman Alexander Lang Elder, and the first Anglican bishop of Adelaide, Augustus Short, and his family.

=== Mentions after his departure ===
Philcox was named in an article in the Adelaide Times in December 1856, along with George Morphett, John Grainger, Edmund Trimmer, and George Aston, which condemned certain land speculators for underhand practices, including conspiring to purchase government land at less than market prices. They were referred to as "land sharks" in the article.

There is a report in the Register on 10 November 1859, from a meeting in Peachey Belt (later Penfield). The report mentions a dinner given by Philcox at "Smidt's Hotel" before his departure. The report says that Philcox had urged his 13 tenants to turn their attention to the cultivation of vineyards.

== Later years and death ==
Philcox appears in further South Australian records: in Rottingdean, Sussex, 1854 (the same retirement place as "his great friend", George Morphett) (9/75); Preston (now part of Brighton – between Brighton centre and Patcham), Sussex, 1855 (336/96); formerly of Burwash, but now of Preston 1857[-1860] (336/119).

In the UK 1861 census he is living in Preston with wife Ann and 24-year-old daughter Margaret (who was born in Clapham, London); in 1871 he is with Margaret, second wife Laura and two infants; in 1881 just he and Laura are recorded in Preston; and in 1891, aged 79, Philcox's residence is shown as Patcham, where Laura and the two children are living.

He died on 31 March 1893 aged 81, with the death registered in the Steyning district (which included Patcham). His widow Laura outlived him, dying in 1921. Both of their last residences were shown as Ashburnham in the SA records.

== Legacy ==
Only one surviving child of the second marriage is recorded, Laura Gordon Philcox. However, Manning's Place Names of South Australia From Aaron Creek to Zion Hill (2006) mentions an unnamed descendant who had sold land in the Adelaide suburb of Hampstead Gardens (part of section 489 in the Hundred of Yatala) to Clearview Ltd (founder of Clearview, South Australia).

Philcox left his mark by naming Evanston and Marryatville (and probably Burwash Road within that suburb, Burwash being his home town), and was involved in numerous land deals in the new colony. Another one of these was in the present-day suburb of Manningham, where "...a former subdivision within the suburb...included...Hampstead Heath, [which] was an 1854 subdivision of section 480 in the Hundred of Yatala by James Philcox".
