= Sefton Park, South Australia =

Sefton Park
- Suburb
- Interactive map of Sefton Park
- Country: Australia
- State: South Australia
- City: Adelaide
- LGAs: City of Port Adelaide Enfield; City of Prospect
- Location: 5 km (3.1 mi) from Adelaide

Government
  - State electorate: Enfield
  - Federal division: Adelaide

Population
  - Total: 1,274 (SAL 2021)
- Postcode: 5083
Suburbs around Sefton Park
Broadview	Enfield
Prospect	Sefton Park	Manningham
	Nailsworth

Sefton Park is a suburb about 6 km north east of the Adelaide CBD, South Australia and lies in both the City of Port Adelaide Enfield and the City of Prospect. It borders the suburbs Enfield, Nailsworth, Prospect and Broadview. Sefton Park is a minor shopping district of Adelaide and is also one of Adelaide's smallest suburbs.

== Housing ==
Sefton Park is one of the older Adelaide suburbs and as such contains many Californian bungalows and some Art Deco homes. There are also Australian colonial style houses.

In recent times, some of these older homes have been demolished to make way for new housing. New developments are typically higher density, fitting two or three homes on one block of land. The suburb's proximity to the CBD means that this is a more lucrative option for developers.

== Shopping ==
Sefton Park has three main shopping centres located only metres from each other.

- Regency Plaza – The smallest of the centres, with just a Lincraft and specialty shops.
- Sefton Plaza – The oldest and largest of the three, containing Target, Foodland (previously Arrow), Best and Less in addition to specialty shops
- Northpark Shopping Centre – technically in the neighbouring suburb of Prospect is located directly across Main North Road from Sefton Plaza. Northpark contains both Woolworths and Coles supermarkets and a number of smaller specialty stores. Northpark has recently been expanded and refurbished, after looking outdated for many years.

== Transport ==
Adelaide Metro bus routes 222, 224, 225F, 228, 229 and N224 (after-midnight service) service Sefton Park along Main North Road, these routes travel between Adelaide's northern suburbs and the Adelaide city centre. This stretch of Main North Road is an Adelaide Metro Go Zone, this means that the maximum wait for a bus is fifteen minutes between 07:30am and 18:30pm on weekdays.

Bus route 100 services Sefton Park along Regency Road. The 100 route circles the Adelaide City Centre via the suburbs. This service does not operate on Sundays or public holidays.

Buses that service in Sefton Park are operated by Torrens Connect. However, buses along Main North Road are operated by Torrens Transit.

The former Tram route 5 to Enfield, operated by the Municipal Tramways Trust serviced Sefton Park, with 3 tram stops on Main North Road, named Stop 15 - Gordon Road and First Avenue, Stop 16 - Edgeworth Street and Grassmere Avenue, Stop 17 - Enfield terminus

== See also ==
- List of Adelaide suburbs
