= Klemzig, South Australia =

Klemzig
- Suburb
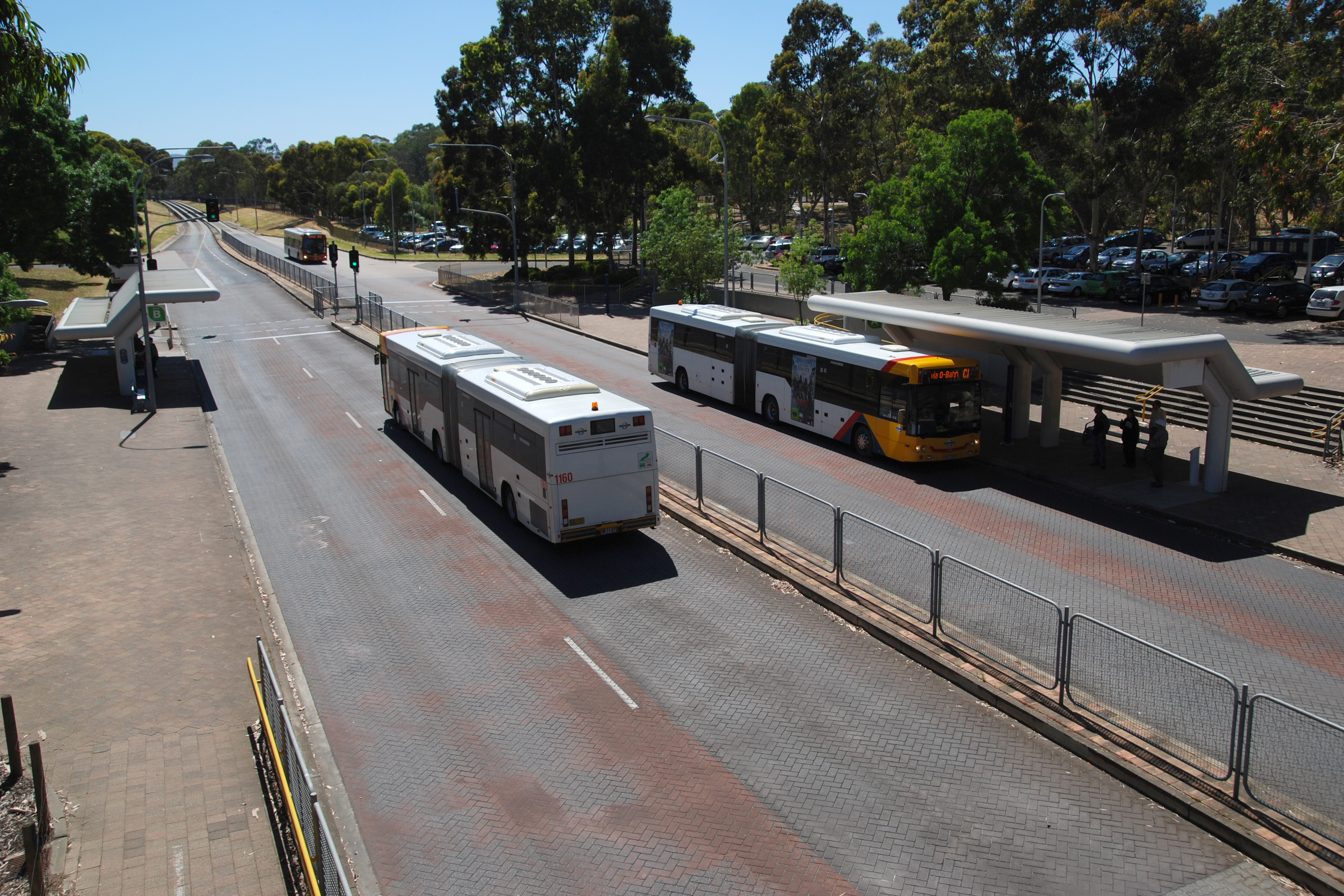
- Klemzig Interchange

- Interactive map of Klemzig
- Coordinates: 34°52′55″S 138°38′10″E
- Country: Australia
- State: South Australia
- City: Adelaide
- LGA: City of Port Adelaide Enfield
- Established: 1837

Government
  - State electorate: Torrens
  - Federal division: Sturt

Area
  - Total: 2.5 km^{2} (0.97 sq mi)

Population
  - Total: 6,713 (SAL 2021)
- Postcode: 5087
Suburbs around Klemzig
Manningham	Hampstead Gardens	Greenacres
Collinswood	Klemzig	Campbelltown
Vale Park	Marden	Felixstow

Klemzig (German: [ˈklɛmtsɪç]) is a suburb of Adelaide in the City of Port Adelaide Enfield. It was the first settlement of German immigrants in Australia and was named after the village of Klemzig in what was then German Prussia and is now Klępsk in western Poland.

Klemzig is home to the National Premier Leagues South Australia (NPL SA) soccer club North Eastern MetroStars, one of the inaugural members of the Australian Championship.

== Background ==
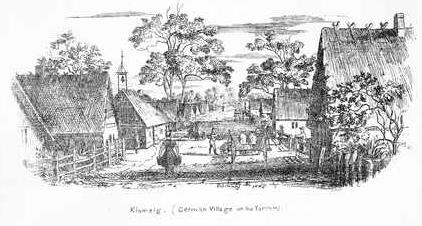
"Klemzig – German Village on the Torrens"

The initial establishment of Klemzig as an Old Lutheran settlement in the South Australian Colony is attributed to a decision by Pastor August Ludwig Christian Kavel. Pastor Kavel was determined to help his loyal parishioners emigrate from Brandenburg, Posen and Silesia to escape religious persecution by King Friedrich Wilhelm III of Prussia.

Pastor Kavel initially planned to move his parishioners to Russia near the Black Sea, where there were already numerous German settlements, but that had proved not to be feasible. Early in 1836, Kavel travelled to Hamburg to investigate possible emigration to America, but lack of available financial assistance caused this plan to collapse.

While in Hamburg, Kavel heard of the wealthy philanthropist, George Fife Angas, who was Chairman of the South Australian Company and likely to assist the Old Lutherans with their migration plans.

Kavel and a representative of his congregation travelled to London in March 1836 and met a very sympathetic George Fife Angas. Angas was a Baptist and was convinced that the Old Lutherans, who placed such high value on their religious beliefs, would make excellent settlers in the South Australian Colony.

Angas persuaded the Directors of the South Australian Company to support him in chartering and fitting out the barque Sarah which was to proceed to Hamburg. Here, 370 Old Lutherans were to set sail for South Australia on 8 June 1836. However, Prussian authorities refused to grant the necessary passports until finally, after a distressing delay of nearly two years, the Prussian Government relented. Over the next six years, many ships brought Kavel's Old Lutheran parishioners to the South Australian Colony.

=== Ships ===
Some of the emigrant ships included:

- The barque Bengalee departed Hamburg on 16 July 1838 and after a seven-day stop off at Kingscote (Kangaroo Island) arrived in Port Adelaide on 16 November 1838. On board were 33 passengers.
- The passenger ship The Prince George departed Hamburg on 13 July 1838 and arrived in Port Adelaide on 18 November 1838. On board were 207 passengers including Pastor Kavel.
- The passenger ship Zebra departed Altona on 28 August 1838 and arrived in Port Adelaide on 27 December 1838. On board were 191 passengers. A listing of the ship's cargo log also reveals that on board were 40,924 bricks presumably for the establishment of new dwellings.
- The barque Cathrina departed Hamburg on 15 September 1838 and arrived in Port Adelaide on 20 January 1839. On board were 122 passengers.
- The passenger ship Skjold departed Altona on 3 July 1841 and arrived in Port Adelaide on 27 October 1841. On board were 241 passengers. Official records show that the three-month journey claimed the lives of 41 people.
- The passenger ship Taglione departed London on 20 June 1842 and arrived in Port Adelaide on 13 October 1842. An unknown number of passengers were on board.
- The passenger ship George Washington departed Hamburg on 23 May 1844 and arrived in Port Adelaide on 12 September 1844. On board were 184 passengers.
- The schooner Joseph Albino departed London on 4 July 1845 and arrived in Port Adelaide on 8 December 1845. On board were 7 passengers.

== Settlement ==
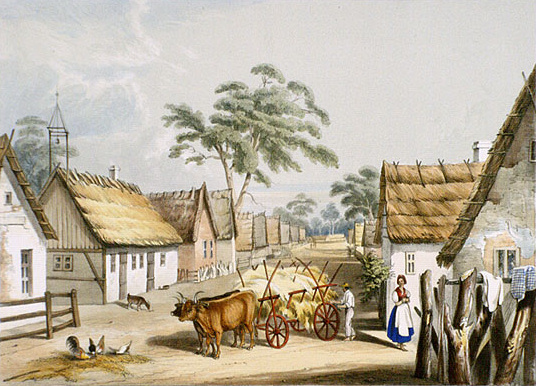
Street scene of Klemzig painted by George French Angas in 1846

In March 1837 Colonel William Light completed surveying Kangaroo Island, Encounter Bay, Port Lincoln and the Adelaide Plains. Light eventually chose the Adelaide Plains as the most suitable location for the capital.

The first groups of Old Lutheran emigrants arrived in Port Misery between October 1838 and January 1839. With the assistance of George Fife Angas, many attempted to integrate into the local community by becoming tradespeople and labourers. Due to the scarcity of work, the lack of English as their preferred language, and the prejudice from the already established British farmers, many Old Lutherans found settlement increasingly hard.

In 1838, Klemzig was founded by these emigrants after George Fife Angas offered a section of land bordering the Torrens River, a few kilometres to the north-east of Adelaide.

Klemzig Village served as a temporary settlement for Lutheran migrants, acting as a staging camp for migrants before they moved further inland. By 1880, the majority of the original inhabitants had departed, and many of the original structures had fallen into disrepair.

== Renaming ==
Due to anti-German sentiment during World War I, the name of Klemzig was changed, as were many other German place names in Australia at the time. In 1917 Klemzig was renamed Gaza, commemorating the British victory in the Third Battle of Gaza, in which Australian troops had a major role. Klemzig was re-instated as the suburb name with the enactment of the South Australia Nomenclature Act of 1935 on 12 December 1935, but remnants of the name Gaza still exist with the local football club still bearing the name. During World War II, the residents of Klemzig petitioned the Government of South Australia on a number of occasions to have the name Gaza re-instated but these requests were denied.

== Transport ==
Klemzig is currently serviced by several bus routes, including 271 and 273 along North East Road, 281 on McLauchlan Road and the W90 on O.G. Road. The suburb is also served by Klemzig Interchange of the O-Bahn Busway.

Torrens Linear Park borders the O-Bahn and River Torrens to the south of the suburb and there is easy access to the CBD as well as neighbouring suburbs.

== See also ==
- List of Adelaide suburbs
