= Northgate, South Australia =

Northgate
- Suburb
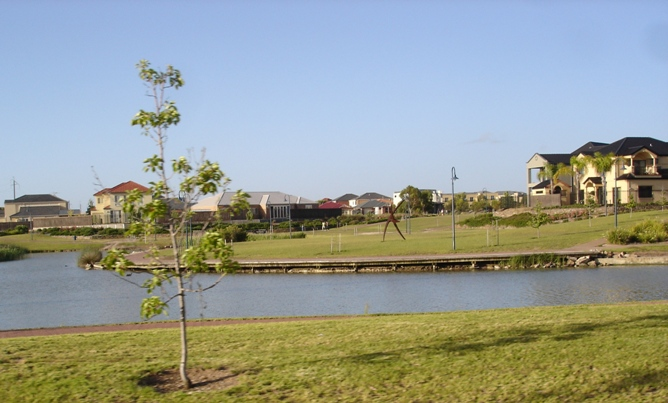

- Coordinates: 34.857840°S 138.630450°E
- Country: Australia
- State: South Australia
- City: Adelaide
- LGA: City of Port Adelaide Enfield
- Location: 8 km (5.0 mi) from Adelaide
- Established: 2000

Government
  - State electorate: Enfield
  - Federal division: Adelaide

Population
  - Total: 3,184 (SAL 2021)
- Postcode: 5085
Suburbs around Northgate
Northfield	Northfield	Walkley Heights
Northfield	Northgate	Oakden
Lightsview	Lightsview	Hillcrest
- Coordinates, adjacent suburbs, electorates

Northgate is a suburb in the inner north-east of Adelaide, South Australia. It is approximately a 10-minute drive from the Adelaide City Council.

Until March 2016, Northgate also included a significant portion of what is now Lightsview.

== Places of interest ==
- Cedar College

== Shopping ==
The Northgate Village Shopping Centre is located on the corner of Fosters Road and Folland Avenue and contains a Woolworths supermarket and some specialty stores.

== Transport ==
Main roads within Northgate which are major public transport routes are:

- Grand Junction Road: Routes 237 and 361
- Fosters Road: Routes 204, 208, 206 and 528

Main North Road and Hampstead Road are major arterial roads, in very close proximity to Northgate, with both having bus services supplying those roads.

The O-Bahn Busway is also close to Northgate, with Adelaide Metro providing a bus service that links the Adelaide city centre, the O-Bahn, Westfield Tea Tree Plaza and Northgate.

The Northfield railway line was located nearby but was closed in 1987.

== See also ==
- List of Adelaide suburbs
