= Nailsworth, South Australia =

Nailsworth
- Suburb
- Interactive map of Nailsworth
- Coordinates: 34°53′03″S 138°36′21″E
- Country: Australia
- State: South Australia
- City: Adelaide
- LGA: City of Prospect
- Established: 1853

Government
  - State electorate: Adelaide Enfield
  - Federal division: Adelaide

Population
  - Total: 2,235 (SAL 2021)
- Postcode: 5083
Suburbs around Nailsworth
Prospect	Sefton Park	Broadview
Prospect	Nailsworth	Broadview
Prospect	Medindie Gardens	Collinswood

Nailsworth is a suburb of the City of Prospect, Adelaide, South Australia. It is located approximately 4 kilometres (2.5 mi) north of City of Adelaide. The suburb borders Sefton Park, Prospect, Broadview, Medindie Gardens and Collinswood.

The North Road Cemetery is located within the suburb. This cemetery was founded by Bishop Augustus Short in 1853 and contains the graves of some prominent South Australians, such as Aboriginal welfare worker and anthropologist Daisy Bates, and philanthropist Julia Farr.

== Government ==
Nailsworth is located in the City of Prospect local government area.

== History ==
Nailsworth is built upon the traditional lands of the Kaurna people, the Indigenous people of the Adelaide Plains region.

Nailsworth was established through a series of transactions in Adelaide's early history. The original holder of the grant was James Mooney of the Survey Department, who in 1838 received a section of land on the eastern side of Main North Road, later known as "New Prospect". In 1845, William Jenkins purchased 21 acres of Section 346, which in 1847 he divided into three equal portions, selling one to Richard James Hart and a second to Enoch Fry. Nailsworth Village was established in 1851 from 64 allotments, and was named after Fry's birthplace of Nailsworth in Gloucestershire, England.

Nailsworth was the location of the first post office of Prospect from 1861 to about 1872. The post office was located at First avenue (First Street, 1860–1901). Two tall palm trees were planted in front of the post office, so that people could see the location of the office from a distance.

In 1930 the schoolyard was the site of a shootout between the police and four escaped convicts from Yatala Labour Prison, two police officers were injured.
