= Enfield, South Australia =

Enfield
- Suburb
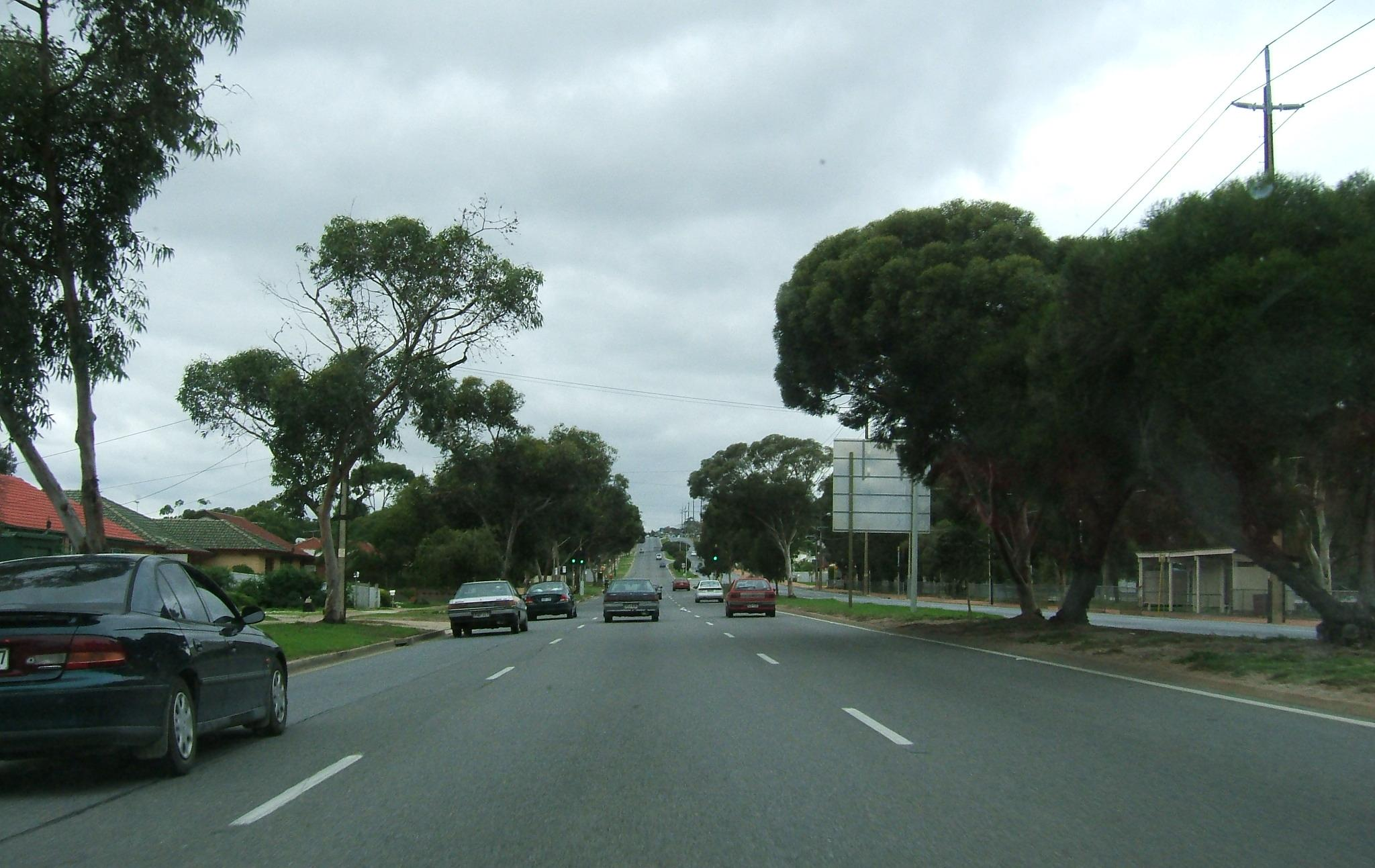

- Country: Australia
- State: South Australia
- City: Adelaide
- LGA: City of Port Adelaide Enfield
- Location: 8 km (5.0 mi) from Adelaide

Government
  - State electorate: Enfield
  - Federal division: Adelaide

Population
  - Total: 6,204 (SAL 2021)
- Postcode: 5085
Suburbs around Enfield
	Gepps Cross
Blair Athol	Enfield	Clearview
Prospect	Sefton Park	Manningham

Enfield is a suburb in Adelaide, Australia, located 8 km (5.0 mi) north of the Adelaide city centre. It is located in the City of Port Adelaide Enfield local government area. Enfield is bordered by Gepps Cross to the north, Blair Athol to the west, Clearview to the east, and Prospect, Sefton Park and Broadview to the south.

== History ==
Enfield was established as a village in 1843 by George Hickox as group of 44 quarter-acre blocks. Hickox named the village after his birthplace, Enfield in Middlesex, United Kingdom. The name "Enfield" is derived from the Anglo-Saxon word enedfeld meaning "duck field".

=== Heritage listings ===
Two houses, a church and a reserve in Enfield are listed on the South Australian Heritage Register.

- Pine Forest in Gurney Terrace, was built in the 1850s by colonist Charles French Folland Snr.
- Barton Vale in Walker Court was the first "grand home" built by pastoralist Edmund Bowman, who arrived in the colony in 1839. The house was originally part of a farm, and was occupied by the Bowman family until 1922. After being acquired by the Salvation Army, it became Barton Vale Girls' Home. Taken over by the state government in 1947, it was renamed Vaughan House Training School for Girls, named after Adelaide social reformer Dorothy Vaughan (1881–1974), and used as a government-run reformatory ("home for wayward girls") and known as Vaughan House until 1979. From then until 1993 it was renamed the South Australian Youth Remand and Assessment Centre. Singer-songwriter Ruby Hunter was placed in this home after having an argument with her foster brother in the family in which she had been previously placed.
- St. Clement's Anglican Church on Main North Road had its Foundation Stone laid on 27 July 1858 but the Church was not opened for worship until 1867. The church was designed by James William Cole in the Gothic Style on land donated by William Bartley. In 1878 the boundaries of the parish extended 'from Prospect Village, north of North Adelaide to within 12½ miles of Gawler, including the districts of Enfield, Salisbury and Virginia'. It became known as the "Little Church on the Hill" and it was a landmark for ships coming into port. For many years the Emblem of the City of Enfield depicted St. Clement's Church in the top right hand corner. In 1969 urgent repairs were needed to maintain the old building. Advice from independent sources, including the National Trust, agreed that major restorations needed to be carried out to preserve the old church. Services are still conducted at the church each Sunday.
- Folland Park on Turnbull Road represents an important area of remnant vegetation.

== Government ==
Enfield is governed by the City of Port Adelaide Enfield council (seated at Port Adelaide) at the local government level. The council has one of its main offices located in the Enfield Public Library, the site of the seat of the former City of Enfield, which amalgamated with the City of Port Adelaide in 1996.

At state government level, Enfield is contained in the state electoral district of Enfield.

The Enfield electorate was first created in 1956-1970 and then later re-established as a part of the 1998 electorate redistributions. Another redistribution in 2003 resulted in the alteration of the southern border.

== Education ==
Enfield has two public schools, Enfield High School and Enfield Primary School. Enfield High (now merged with Roma Mitchell Secondary College) is located on Grand Junction Road. Enfield Primary is located nearby.

St Gabriel's School in Whittington Street is a Catholic primary school with enrolments from Reception to Year 7. It is the parish school of the Good Shepherd Church in Clearview.

== Shopping ==
Enfield has a small shopping centre located near the library, which includes Enfield Post Office. The southern end of Enfield is well serviced by Northpark Shopping Centre, Regency Plaza and Sefton Plaza, located in the neighbouring suburbs of Prospect and Sefton Park.

== Transport ==
Several bus routes travel from Adelaide CBD to various destinations in the northern suburbs via Main North Road, on Enfield's western boundary. Circle Line route 300 services Regency Road on the southern boundary of Enfield and links the suburb with various destinations, such as Arndale Shopping Centre and Norwood. Bus routes 237 and 361 travel along Grand Junction Road on the northern boundary of Enfield to Port Adelaide, Valley View and Tea Tree Plaza.

== See also ==
- List of Adelaide suburbs
- City of Enfield
