= Electoral district of Enfield =

South Australian state electoral district

Enfield South Australia—House of Assembly
- Interactive map of electoral district boundaries from the 2022 state election (Note: The electorate will have no change in boundaries at the 2026 state election.)
- State: South Australia
- Dates current: 1956–1970, 2002–present
- MP: Lawrence Ben
- Party: Labor
- Namesake: Enfield, South Australia
- Electors: 28,104 (2026)
- Area: 19.1 km^{2} (7.4 sq mi)
- Demographic: Metropolitan
- Coordinates: 34°51′58″S 138°36′27″E
Electorates around Enfield:
Port Adelaide	Florey	Florey
Croydon	Enfield	Torrens
Adelaide	Adelaide	Torrens

Enfield is a single-member electoral district for the South Australian House of Assembly. Named after the suburb of the same name, it is a 19.1 km^{2} (7.4 sq mi) suburban electorate in Adelaide's inner north, taking in the suburbs of Blair Athol, Broadview, Clearview, Enfield, Kilburn, Lightsview, Northgate, and Sefton Park; and parts of Nailsworth, Northfield and Prospect. The seat is currently held by Labor MP Lawrence Ben.

== History ==
Enfield was first created to replace the abolished electoral district of Prospect for the 1956 election. It was abolished for the 1970 election, substantially replaced by the new electorate of Ross Smith.

Enfield was recreated for the 2002 election as a safe Labor electorate, replacing the abolished electorate of Ross Smith, and was won by Labor candidate John Rau. Rau had defeated Ralph Clarke, the former member for Ross Smith, in a Labor preselection ballot. Clarke subsequently contested the election as an independent, but came third, falling 800 votes short of the Liberal candidate. At the 2006 election, Clarke decided to contest a South Australian Legislative Council seat, for which he had very little chance of success. Without competition from Clarke, Rau extended his margin, easily retaining the electorate for Labor. Andrea Michaels won the seat at the 2019 Enfield state by-election. Prior to the 2026 South Australian state election, Micheals announced she would not seek reelection.

In the 2016 redistribution by the electoral districts boundaries commission, the districts southern suburbs of Collinswood and Manningham were reassigned to the neighbouring districts of Adelaide and Torrens. The districts western suburbs of Regency Park, Ferryden Park, Angle Park and Mansfield Park were reassigned to the adjacent district of Croydon. The northeastern boundary was extended to include the suburbs of Northgate, Lightsview and part of Northfield within Enfield district, and the southwestern boundary was shifted south slightly to include part of Prospect.

In both of its incarnations, Enfield has been a comfortably-safe Labor seat. Counting its time as Prospect and Ross Smith, Labor has held it without interruption since 1953.

== Members for Enfield ==
First incarnation 1956–1970
Member	Party	Term
Jack Jennings	Labor	1956–1970
Second incarnation 2002–
Member	Party	Term
John Rau	Labor	2002–2018
Andrea Michaels	Labor	2019–2026
Lawrence Ben	Labor	2026–present

== Election results ==
2026 South Australian state election: Enfield
Party	Candidate	Votes	%	±%
Labor	Lawrence Ben	10,792	45.8	−6.5
One Nation	Paul Morrell	4,344	18.5	+14.0
Liberal	Oscar Ong	3,503	14.9	−14.3
Greens	Chris Siclari	2,727	11.6	+1.6
Independent Socialist	Leila Clendon	1,172	5.0	+5.0
Family First	Daniel Solomon	575	2.4	−1.6
United Voice	Andrew Riglin	287	1.2	+1.2
Australian Family	Ariah Merrett	137	0.6	+0.6
Total formal votes		23,537	95.5	−1.2
Informal votes		1,105	4.5	+1.2
Turnout		24,642	87.7	−0.4
Two-candidate-preferred result
Labor	Lawrence Ben	16,184	68.8	+4.3
One Nation	Paul Morrell	7,353	31.2	+31.2
Labor hold				
