= Walkerville, South Australia =

Walkerville
- Suburb
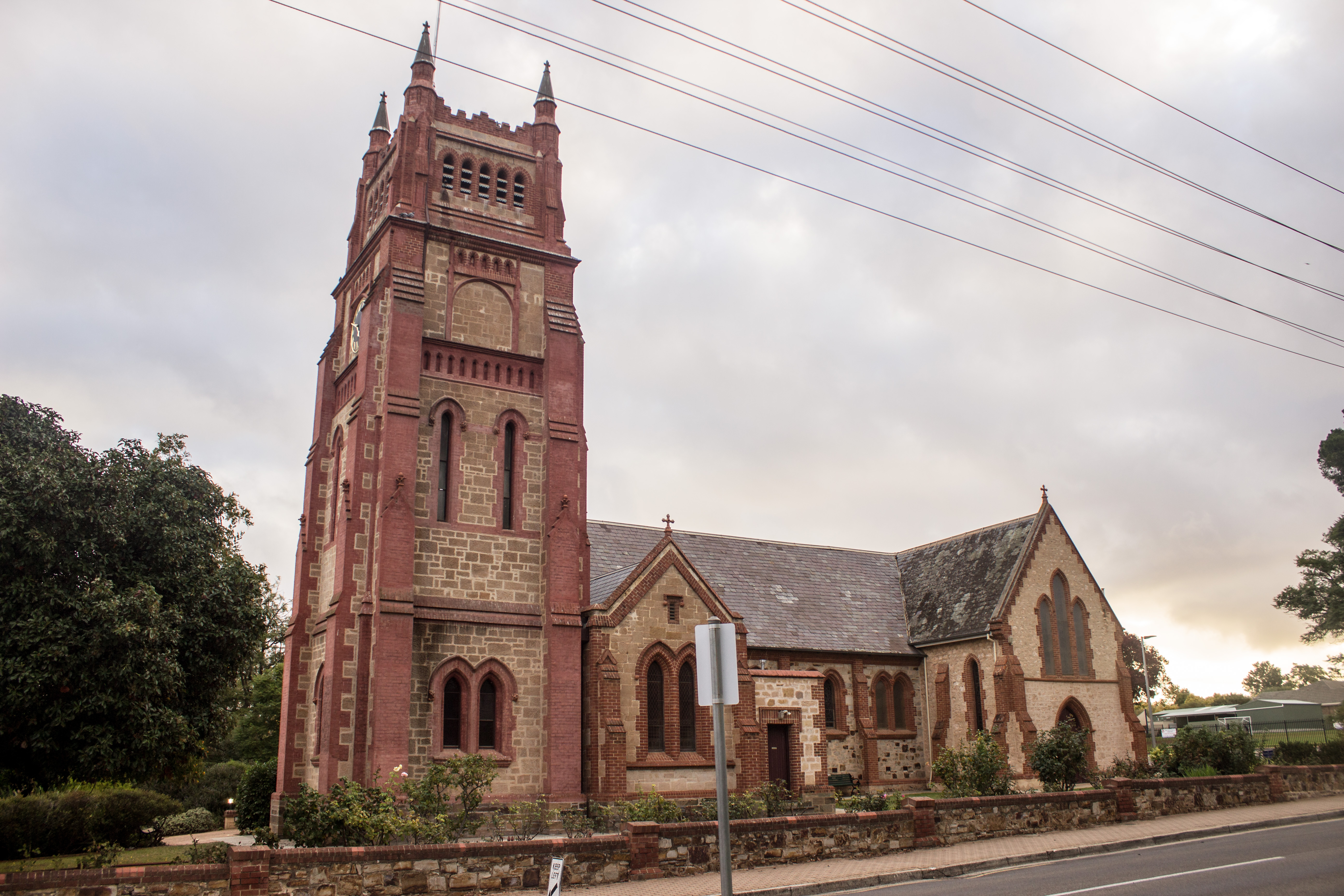
- St Andrew's Anglican church, Walkerville

- Interactive map of Walkerville
- Coordinates: 34°53′S 138°37′E
- Country: Australia
- State: South Australia
- City: Adelaide
- LGA: Town of Walkerville
- Established: 1838

Government
  - State electorate: Adelaide
  - Federal division: Adelaide

Area
  - Total: 1.34 km^{2} (0.52 sq mi)

Population
  - Total: 2,867 (SAL 2021)
- Postcode: 5081
Suburbs around Walkerville
Collinswood	Manningham	Vale Park
Medindie Gardens; Medindie	Walkerville	Marden
Gilberton	St Peters	Royston Park; Joslin

Walkerville is a suburb of Adelaide, South Australia. It lies just north east of the city centre, about 4 kilometres (2.5 mi) from the Adelaide GPO. Walkerville is one of South Australia's most affluent suburbs.

== History ==
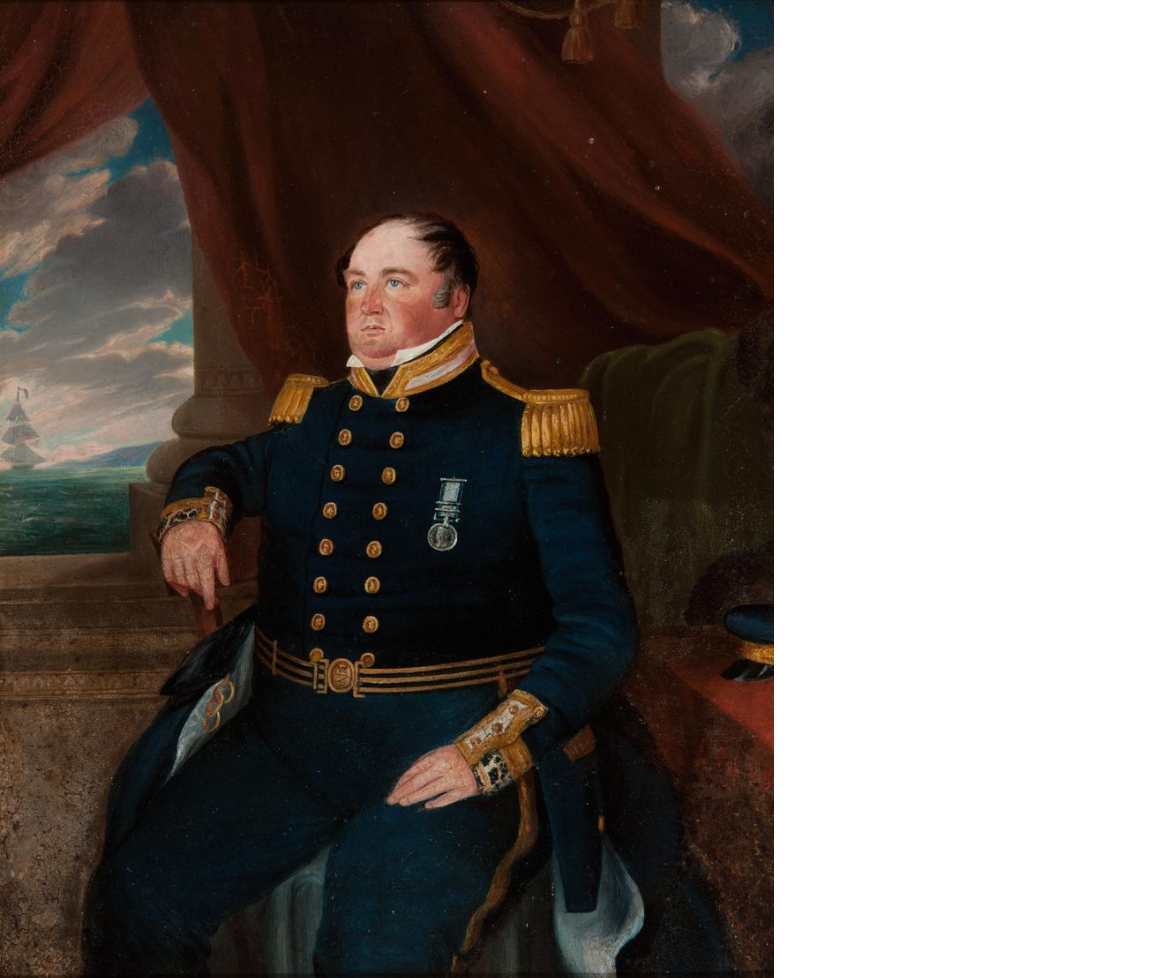
Captain John Walker R.N., oil on metal, c.1846, Martha Berkeley

Walkerville was named after one Captain John Walker R. N., who took up land in the district in 1838, two years after the first colonists arrived in South Australia. The area was attractive to early settlers and within a few years, the settlement had become a village. During the 1840s, Walker fell victim to over-speculation in land value and a statewide financial depression. He was imprisoned briefly for debt and in 1849 he left the colony to take up a government position in Hobart. His connection with the state, although brief, is remembered in the naming of the suburb.

Walkerville Post Office opened on 1 January 1896 and Walkerville District Council was established in 1855 after a petition by local residents proclaimed a desire to break away from the larger District Council of Yatala (proclaimed in 1853). Initially, only the suburbs of Walkerville and Gilberton seceded from Yatala but within a few months, Medindie and North Walkerville (now part of Walkerville proper, east of Fuller Street) were included in Walkerville council as well. The district boundaries remained unchanged until 1970 when Vale Park was added.

Early council meetings were held in a room at the local pub, the Sussex Arms, until 1893 when the foundation stone for the present Town Hall was laid on Walkerville Terrace. In 1908, the Institute Library was founded in a small room opposite the municipal offices. In 1963, it became incorporated as a public library, and in 1970 it moved next door into dedicated space within the former Walkerville Police Station.

In 2012 Walkerville was reported to be South Australia's second "top earning suburb".

== Governance ==
Walkerville is the seat and main suburb of the Town of Walkerville, named after Walkerville itself. Being an inner north eastern suburb, Walkerville lies in the state electoral district of Adelaide as well as the federal electoral division of Adelaide.

== Schools ==
There are three primary schools in Walkerville: St Andrew's Anglican School was founded in 1850, Walkerville Primary School was founded in 1884. and St Monica's Parish School in 1926.

== Historic buildings and other landmarks ==
Walkerville is home to many historic buildings and other landmarks.

=== St Andrew's Anglican Church ===
One such building, which features on Walkerville's Seal of Office, is St Andrew's Anglican Church. Construction for the church began in 1847 and was completed the following year. The church was initially without a permanent reverend, the congregation relying on the services of the St Peter's College headmaster, Reverend T. P. Wilson. In 1850 the church's first resident reverend, Reverend John Watson, arrived.

The original building was only 12 m (39 ft) long and was subject to much renovation in the second half of the 19th century. In 1857 a sanctuary and transepts were added. Rev George Dove succeeded Watson in 1882, and would serve the congregation for nearly 50 years. In 1886 the original building was replaced by a longer nave. A tower was also added, with clock donated by the widow of Henry Kent Hughes.

=== Wesleyan Cemetery ===
Walkerville Wesleyan Cemetery on Smith Street is notable for the number of early settlers to the colony of South Australia, of all denominations. Around 3,785 people are buried there, of whom two thirds are children, including 100 under the age of 1. Prominent settlers interred in the cemetery include the German Lutheran farmer-turned-politician Johann Sudholz and his daughter-in-law Dora; Phillip Le Cornu (1836–1921), (Note: Cemetery article appears to be wrongly spelt as Philip; mostly spelt Phillip.) from Jersey, Channel Islands, founder of the long-running furniture business, Le Cornu; George William Cole, politician; and many others.

== See also ==
- List of Adelaide suburbs
- Town of Walkerville
