= Lightsview =

- Suburb
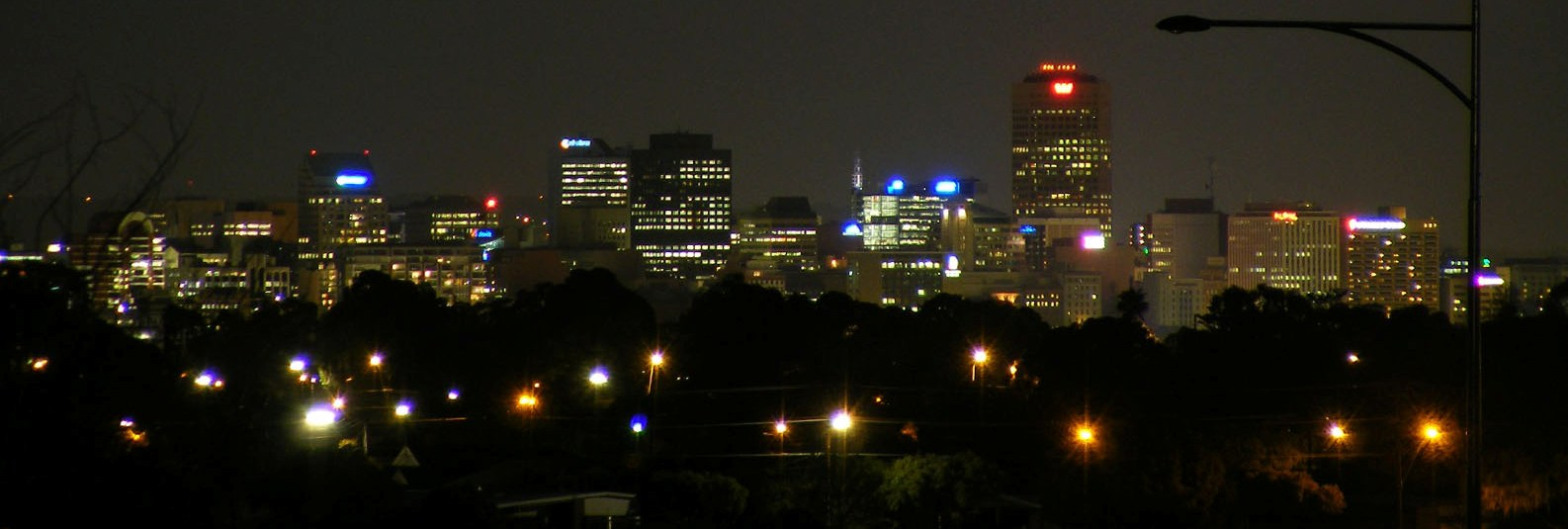
- The Adelaide skyline at night from Lightsview and Northgate

- Coordinates: 34°51′48″S 138°37′33″E
- Country: Australia
- State: South Australia
- City: Adelaide
- LGA: City of Port Adelaide Enfield
- Established: 7 April 2016

Government
  - State electorate: Enfield
  - Federal division: Adelaide

Population
  - Total: 6,090 (SAL 2021)
- Postcode: 5085
Suburbs around Lightsview
Clearview	Northfield; Northgate	Oakden
Clearview	Lightsview	Oakden; Hillcrest
Clearview	Greenacres	Hillcrest

Lightsview is a suburb in the City of Port Adelaide Enfield. It was created in April 2016 from parts of Northgate, Greenacres and Northfield. It is in the inner northeast, bounded by Hampstead Road, Redward Avenue, Fosters Road and Folland Avenue.

The bulk of the suburb of Lightsview began as a housing development (also named Lightsview) in the southern part of what was then the suburb of Northgate in 2006. The project was extended in October 2013 with the addition of the land from the former Ross Smith Secondary School.

The suburb includes a row of houses along the north side of Redward Avenue that had previously been in Greenacres and are older than the main development. It also includes land fronting Hampstead Road that had been in Northfield including the former high school site and the Hampstead Rehabilitation Centre (a campus of the Royal Adelaide Hospital).
