= Clearview, South Australia =

Clearview
- Suburb
- Coordinates: 34.859°S 138.617°E
- Country: Australia
- State: South Australia
- City: Adelaide
- LGA: City of Port Adelaide Enfield

Government
  - State electorate: Enfield
  - Federal division: Adelaide

Area
  - Total: 1.7 km^{2} (0.66 sq mi)

Population
  - Total: 4,261 (SAL 2021)
- Postcode: 5085
Suburbs around Clearview
Gepps Cross	Gepps Cross	Northfield
Enfield	Clearview	Lightsview
Enfield	Broadview	Greenacres

Clearview is a suburb of Adelaide, South Australia about 8 km north of the Adelaide city centre. The rectangular suburb is bordered by Grand Junction Road on the north, Hampstead Road on the east, Collins Street, Broadview on the south, and the suburb of Enfield on the west.

== History ==
The name Clearview originated in 1922, when Clearview Ltd laid out a residential subdivision on parts of sections 334 and 338 and sections 335 and 336 in the Hundred of Yatala. The subdivision was named for its elevated position, which originally provided views over the Adelaide Plains and the River Torrens. Part of the area was formerly known as Enfield Heights, with the Clearview name adopted for the suburb in the early 1960s.

=== Postwar development ===
Clearview experienced substantial residential development during the years following the Second World War. Much of its housing was constructed during the 1950s, including modest dwellings associated with the postwar housing shortage.

The suburb played a role in the South Australian Housing Trust's prefabricated housing program. Between 1950 and 1954, the Trust imported 3,832 prefabricated timber houses from Britain and Germany to help address housing shortages. According to a South Australian Government heritage study, the first of these imported homes were rented to tenants in Clearview and were subsequently sold.

Many original houses were built in the economical postwar "austerity" style. Since the early 21st century, some of these dwellings have been replaced by contemporary houses and townhouses.

=== Community development ===
Enfield Memorial Park, located on Browning Street, began operating in 1947, with its first burial taking place on 9 March of that year.

The Clearview Tennis Club was established in 1961 by the Clearview Progress Association, with the support of Enfield City Council. The club initially operated two tennis courts at St Albans Reserve. The council assumed responsibility for the reserve's administration in March 1969. Clearview was originally planned and laid out in 1922 by the Clearview company on parts of sections 334-346 and 338 in the Hundred of Yatala. It was so named because the high ground on which it was situated had a good view south west to the River Torrens and west and north west of the portion of the Adelaide Plains that was to become Adelaide's inner north and north west suburbia. Previous name was Enfield Heights and was named Clearview in the early 1960s.

Prior to subdivision and residential construction in the 1950s, most of the land at Clearview was cultivated for almond farming, and some homes still contain the remnants of the orchard, with almond trees being somewhat common in Clearview back yards.

The majority of the earliest residential buildings in Clearview were constructed in the 1950s. The predominant style of house built during the suburb's 1950s heyday were "austerity" homes, so named because they were designed to be cheap to build during the post war conditions of building materials shortage, and returning servicemen who were looking for housing and a place to start a family. However, with many of the old timber-framed houses being demolished in place for new, modern homes, this coupled with its closeness to the city centre has allowed it to enjoy a steady increase in property value over the past decade. Clearview Post Office opened on 19 January 1954.

As of 2015, by virtue of its proximity to the Adelaide city centre, Clearview has begun to experience a renaissance, with modern 3 bedroom homes appealing to a younger demographic who look for modern housing close to schools and the city centre.

== Geography ==
Clearview sits atop a gentle rise, and from some parts, depending and weather, line of sight right down to Port Adelaide is possible from ground view. This situation gave rise to the suburb name, via its founding company, Clearview Ltd.

Most of the original vegetation has been lost due to urbanisation with the exception of areas in the neighbouring suburb of Enfield. Folland Park Reserve and the adjacent Enfield Memorial Park's "Wirra Wonga" (meaning bush grave in the indigenous Kaurna language) contain remnants of mallee box vegetation. Most of the suburb would have been dominated by a native pine forest according to accounts in Kraehenbuehl's book "Pre-European Vegetation of Adelaide". The soil of Clearview is brown and sandy to clay. The Keswich Clay deposit is present in the soil profile which is known for its reactivity.

== Governance ==
The first local government in Clearview was the District Council of Yatala, established in 1853. In 1868, Yatala council was split at Dry Creek and from then Clearview was in the District Council of Yatala South, renamed to be Enfield council in 1933. Since 1996, Clearview has been locally governed by the City of Port Adelaide Enfield with the Enfield Library Council Office on Central Parade, Enfield, serving as the nearest council branch office.

Clearview is in the state government electorate of Enfield and the federal government electorate of Adelaide.

== Amenities ==
Clearview contains several parks: St Albans Reserve in the north, Folland Park on the western flank, Enfield Memorial Park cemetery, and Somerset Reserve in the south. St Albans Reserve contains a sporting oval, tennis courts and an associated athletics club. The Catholic Church in the suburb is dedicated to Jesus, the Good Shepherd.

== See also ==
- List of Adelaide suburbs
