= City of Port Adelaide Enfield =

Coordinates: 34°51′S 138°30′E

- Local government area
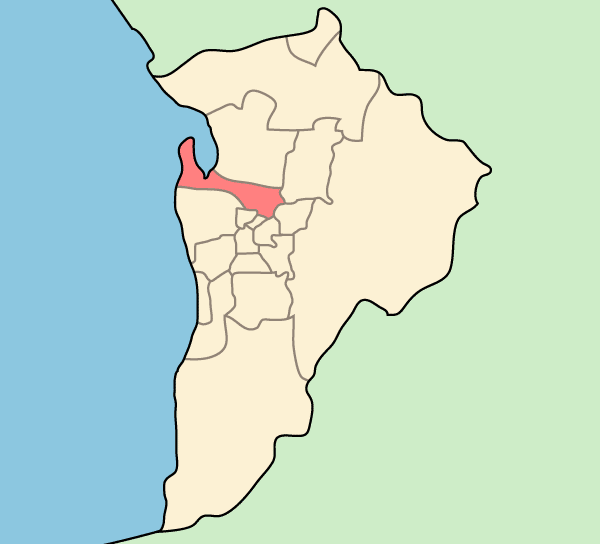
- Location of Port Adelaide Enfield within the Adelaide metropolitan area

- Interactive map of City of Port Adelaide Enfield
- Country: Australia
- State: South Australia
- Region: Western Adelaide; Northern Adelaide
- Established: 26 March 1996
- Council seat: Port Adelaide

Government
  - Mayor: Claire Boan
  - State electorate: Port Adelaide, Lee, Cheltenham, Croydon, Playford, Enfield, Torrens, Florey, Dunstan
  - Federal division: Port Adelaide, Adelaide, Makin, Sturt

Area
  - Total: 94 km^{2} (36 sq mi)

Population
  - Total: 132,400 (LGA 2021)
  - Density: 1,576.2/km^{2} (4,082/sq mi)
- Website: City of Port Adelaide Enfield
LGAs around City of Port Adelaide Enfield
Salisbury	Tea Tree Gully
City of Port Adelaide Enfield	Campbelltown
Charles Sturt, Prospect, Walkerville	Norwood Payneham & St Peters

The City of Port Adelaide Enfield (PAE), located across inner north and north-western suburbs of Adelaide, is one of the largest metropolitan councils within South Australia. It was established on 26 March 1996 by the amalgamation of the City of Port Adelaide and the City of Enfield.

Extending from the River Torrens to Outer Harbor, and covering an area of approximately 97 km^{2}, Port Adelaide Enfield contains some of South Australia's finest historical buildings and landmarks. The Port Adelaide area is known as the History Precinct, as it is home to the Maritime Museum, the National Railway Museum and the Aviation Museum.

As of March 2024, the current mayor is Claire Boan, who was elected in 2018. There are 17 ward councillors who represent the residents and businesses of their wards at council meetings.

== Council ==
The current council as of December 2022 is:

Ward	Party	Councilor	First elected	Notes
Mayor	Independent	Claire Boan	2010	
Enfield	Labor	Olivia Colombo	2020	
Enfield	Independent	Carol Martin	1997	
Enfield	Independent	Barbara Clayton	2018	
Klemzig	Labor	Hannah Evans	2018	Deputy Mayor (2021–2022)
Klemzig	Independent	Paul Russell	2014	Deputy Mayor (2020–2021)
Northfield	Labor	Matt Osborn	2014	Deputy Mayor (2017–2018, 2024–present)
Northfield	Independent	Mark Basham	1991	
Northfield	Greens	Lazaras Panayiotou	2022	
Outer Harbor	Independent	Adrian Wotton	2021	
Outer Harbor	Independent	Vanessa Tulloch	2014	Deputy Mayor (2016–2017, 2023–2024)
Parks	Labor	Kim Dinh	2014	
Parks	Independent	Kat Mitchell	2018	
Parks	Labor	Wasim Saeed	2022	
Port Adelaide	Labor	Steve Vines	2018	Deputy Mayor (2022–2023)
Port Adelaide	Independent	Joost den Hartog	2018	
Semaphore	Independent	Peter McGregor	2022	
Semaphore	Labor	David Wilkins	2018	Deputy Mayor (2019–20)

== History ==
The City of Port Adelaide Enfield was established on 26 March 1996 by the amalgamation of the City of Port Adelaide and the City of Enfield.

The council of Port Adelaide was established on 27 December 1855 when Port Adelaide was declared a Corporate Town centred at the port of Adelaide, which had been opened some years prior in 1837. From 1884 to 1900 five adjacent district councils were amalgamated with the Corporate Town of Port Adelaide, dramatically increasing its size. In 1901 Port Adelaide was proclaimed a city by Governor Tennyson.

Centred around the township of Enfield, the District Council of Yatala south was formed in 1868 when the District Council of Yatala was divided in two. Dry Creek and the Dry Creek-Port Adelaide railway line formed the new council's northern boundary. In 1933, Yatala South was renamed to be Enfield Council. In 1944 Enfield District Council became a municipality and in 1953, thanks to the post-war boom in population, it was upgraded to city status.

=== Mayors ===
- Johannes Gerardus (Hans) Pieters (1996)
- Michael (Mike) Charles Stock (1996–1997)
- Johanna Maria Hendrika McLuskey (1997–2003)
- Fiona Barr (2003–2006)
- Gary Robert Johanson (2006–2018)
- Claire Boan (2018–present)

== Suburbs ==
- Alberton – 5014
- Angle Park – 5010
- Birkenhead – 5015
- Blair Athol – 5084
- Broadview – 5083 (part)
- Clearview – 5085
- Croydon Park – 5008
- Dernancourt – 5075 (part)
- Devon Park – 5008 (part)
- Dry Creek – 5094 (part)
- Dudley Park – 5008
- Enfield – 5085
- Ethelton – 5015
- Exeter – 5019
- Ferryden Park – 5010
- Gepps Cross – 5094
- Gilles Plains – 5086 (part)
- Gillman – 5013
- Glanville – 5015
- Greenacres – 5086
- Hampstead Gardens – 5086
- Hillcrest – 5086
- Holden Hill – 5088 (part)
- Kilburn – 5084
- Klemzig – 5087
- Largs Bay – 5016
- Largs North – 5016
- Lightsview – 5085
- Manningham – 5086
- Mansfield Park – 5012
- New Port – 5015
- North Haven – 5018
- Northfield – 5085
- Northgate – 5085
- Oakden – 5086
- Osborne – 5017
- Ottoway – 5013
- Outer Harbor – 5018
- Peterhead – 5016
- Port Adelaide – 5015
- Prospect - 5082 (part)
- Queenstown – 5014
- Regency Park – 5010
- Rosewater – 5013
- Sefton Park – 5083 (part)
- Semaphore – 5019
- Semaphore South – 5019
- Taperoo – 5017
- Valley View – 5093 (part)
- Walkley Heights – 5098 (part)
- Windsor Gardens – 5087
- Wingfield – 5013
- Woodville Gardens – 5012

== See also ==
- Local Government Areas of South Australia
- City of Port Adelaide
  - James Millner (doctor), early alderman of Port Adelaide Council
- City of Enfield
- List of Adelaide parks and gardens
