= Collinswood, South Australia =

Collinswood
- Suburb
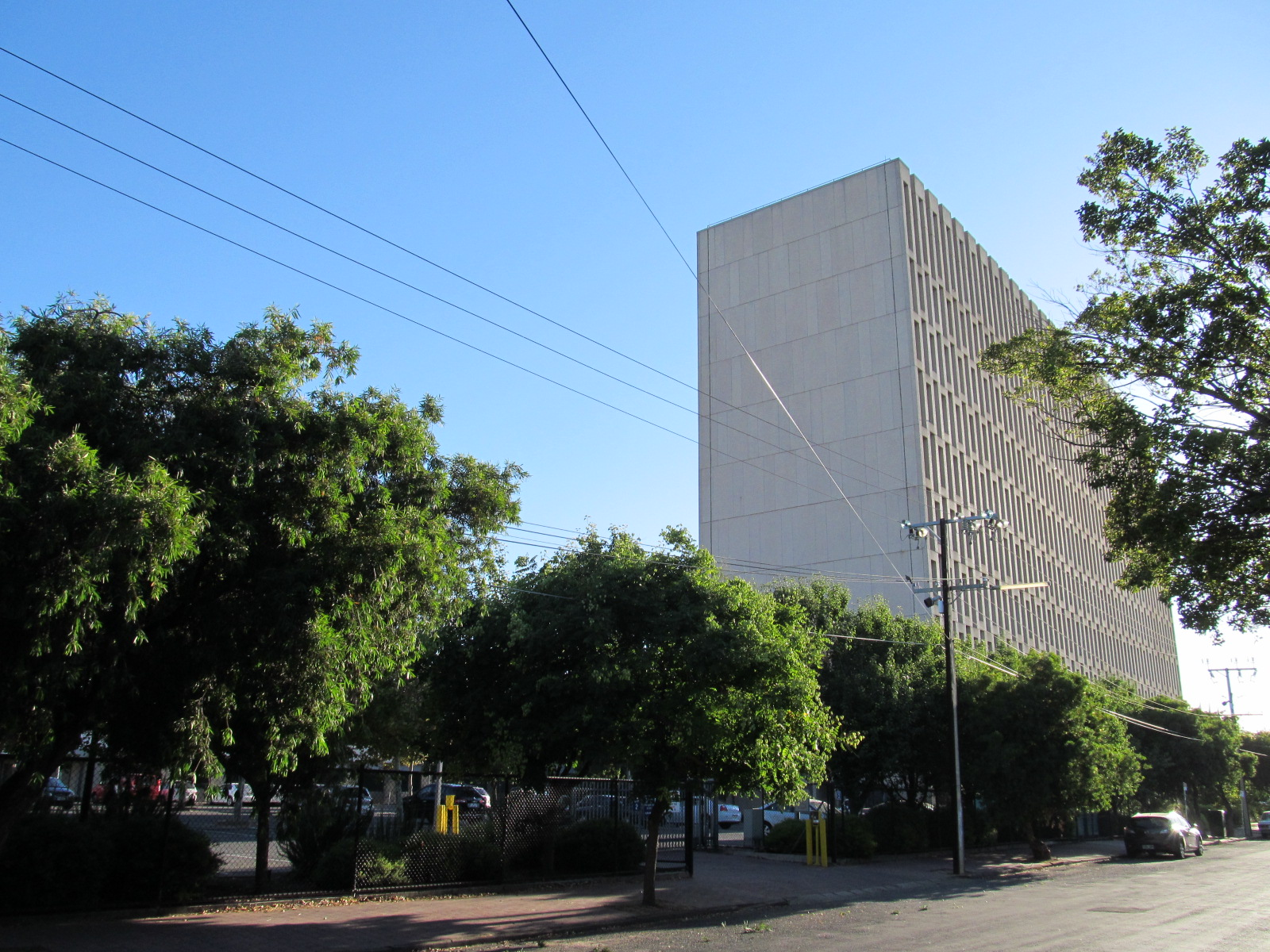
- ABC building seen from west

- Interactive map of Collinswood
- Country: Australia
- State: South Australia
- City: Adelaide
- LGA: City of Prospect
- Location: 6 km (3.7 mi) from Adelaide CBD

Government
  - State electorate: Adelaide
  - Federal division: Adelaide

Area
  - Total: 0.51 km^{2} (0.20 sq mi)

Population
  - Total: 1,496 (SAL 2021)
- Postcode: 5081
Suburbs around Collinswood
Nailsworth	Broadview	Manningham
Medindie Gardens	Collinswood	Vale Park
Medindie	Gilberton	Walkerville

Collinswood is a suburb in Adelaide, Australia, spanning the boundary of the Prospect and the Port Adelaide Enfield local government areas.

== History ==
In 1838 George Fife Angas selected "country section" 474 in the later-proclaimed Hundred of Yatala. He had been given the right to make first choice of a country section, to which he and other early investors in South Australia were entitled by their purchase of land orders prior to settlement (see Lands administrative divisions of South Australia § Land division history). The bounds of section 474 correspond almost exactly with the present-day Collinwood, but the triangle of land was split, in the early days, between the suburb of Rosebery, in the south, and Collinswood, in the north.

Hampstead Post Office opened around 1927 and was renamed Collinswood in 1964.

== Facilities ==
The Australian Broadcasting Corporation (ABC) studios on the corner of North East Road and Galway Avenue opened in 1974. The ABC announced plans in 2025 to move operations from Collinswood to a new arts precinct on the site of the old Adelaide Central bus station in Franklin Street, Adelaide by 2031.

Country Arts SA, the State Theatre Company South Australia and State Opera South Australia, who are all tenants of the ABC building, will also move.

== Population ==
In the 2016 Census, there were 1,384 people in Collinswood. 65.8% of people were born in Australia and 68.3% of people spoke only English at home. The most common responses for religion were No Religion 34.0%, Catholic 17.4% and Anglican 10.3%. There is a German Catholic community in Collinswood, whose church is dedicated to St Boniface.
