= Greenacres, South Australia =

Coordinates: 34°52′16″S 138°38′13″E

Greenacres
- Suburb
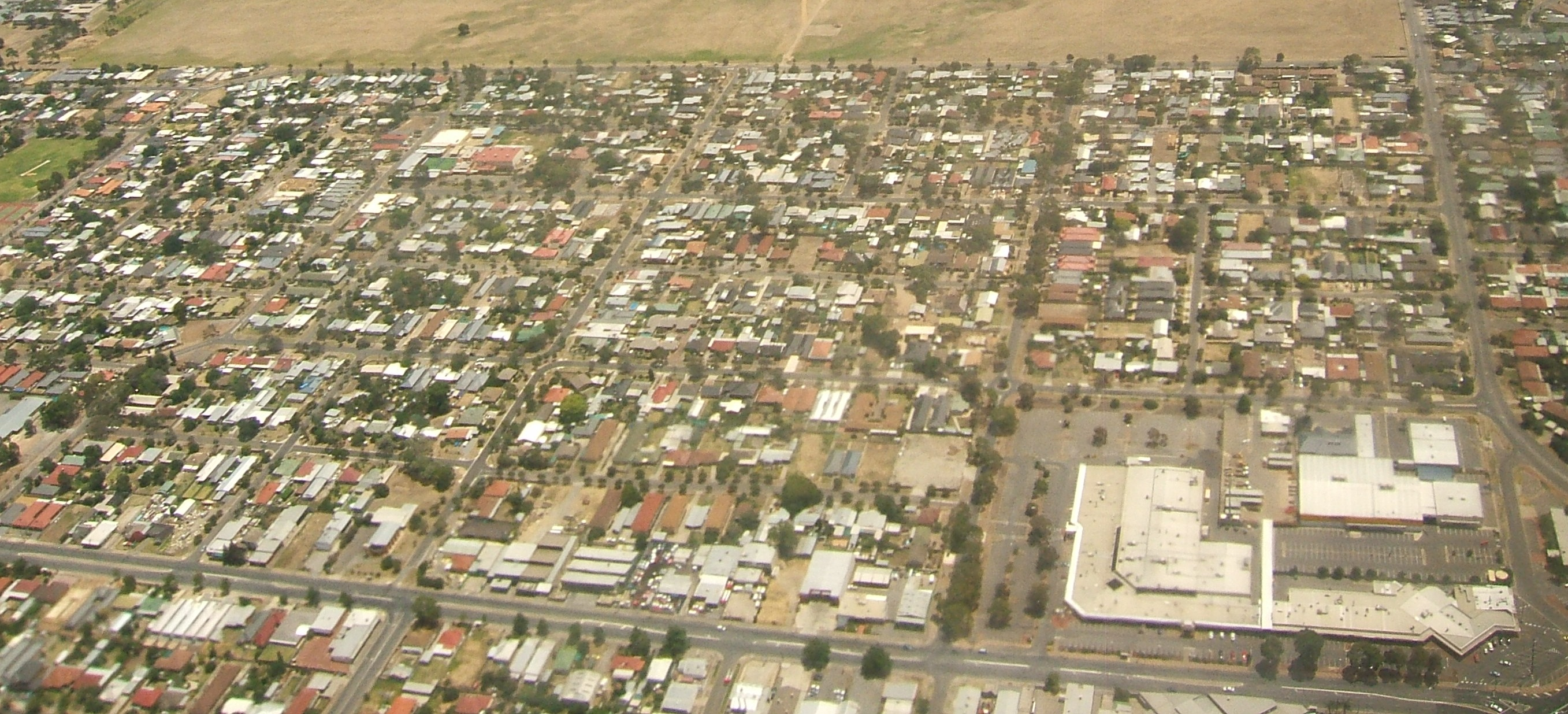
- Aerial image of eastern end of Greenacres, looking north. The east-west road at the bottom is Muller Road, the Greenacres Shopping Centre is the large complex at bottom right
- Country: Australia
- State: South Australia
- City: Adelaide
- LGA: City of Port Adelaide Enfield

Government
  - State electorate: Torrens
  - Federal division: Adelaide

Population
  - Total: 3,356 (SAL 2021)
- Postcode: 5086
Suburbs around Greenacres
Clearview	Lightsview	Hillcrest
Clearview, Broadview	Greenacres	Hillcrest
Broadview	Manningham, Hampstead Gardens	Klemzig

Greenacres is a north eastern suburb of Adelaide, South Australia in the City of Port Adelaide Enfield. It is considered to be an inner suburb of Greater Adelaide. Hampstead Road and Muller Road intersect at the south west corner of Greenacres making it a bustling area during rush hour. These form the western and southern boundaries of the suburb, with Fosters Road on the east and Redward Avenue on the northern boundary.

== Demography ==
According to the Australian Bureau of Statistics, at the 2021 census the suburb had a population of 3,356, split evenly between males and females. Approximately 48.7% of Greenacres' residents were born overseas, of whom the largest percentage were born in India followed by China, England, Nepal and Sri Lanka. 2.2% identified themselves as Indigenous Australians. The majority of the population were employed in professional jobs, community and personal services, administration or labouring. Approximately 29.5% of Greenacres' population identify as non-religious, 22% practice Hinduism and 15.4% are Catholic.

== Facilities ==
The suburb features Hampstead Barracks, a small suburban Australian Army base. The Catholic Church in the suburb is dedicated to Saint Martin.
