= Hampstead Gardens, South Australia =

Hampstead Gardens
- Suburb
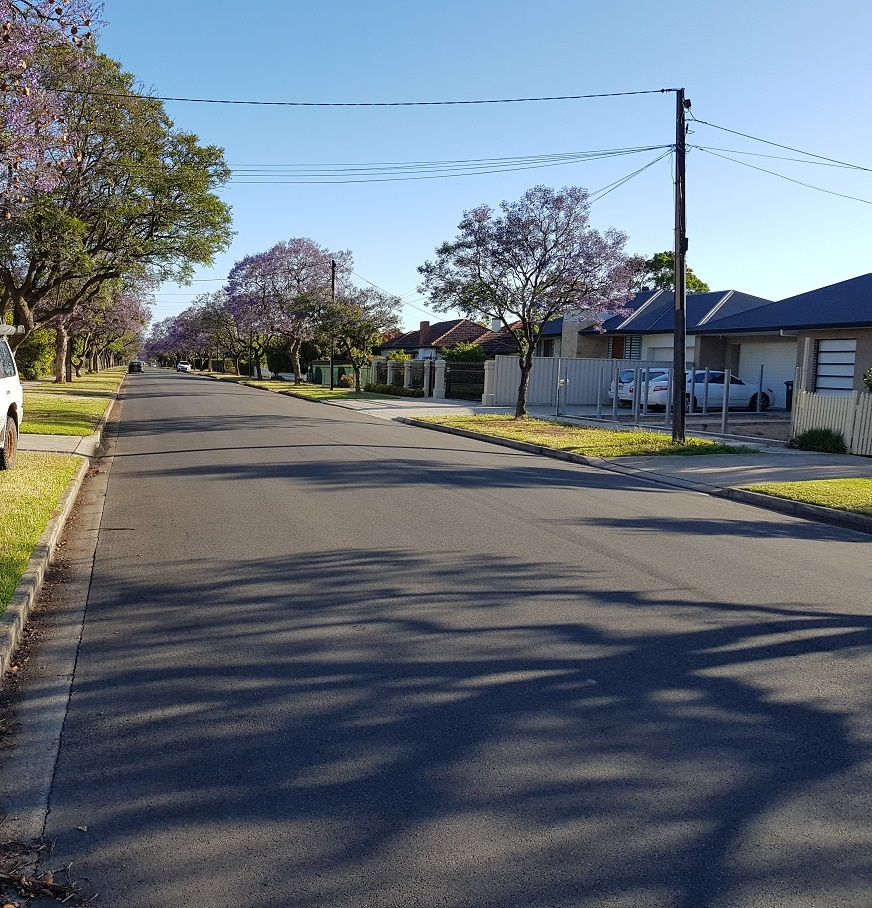
- Ways Road, which divides Hampstead Gardens from adjacent Manningham

- Interactive map of Hampstead Gardens
- Coordinates: 34°52′29.088″S 138°37′42.519″E
- Country: Australia
- State: South Australia
- City: Adelaide
- LGA: City of Port Adelaide Enfield

Government
  - State electorate: Torrens
  - Federal division: Adelaide

Population
  - Total: 1,535 (SAL 2021)
- Postcode: 5086
Suburbs around Hampstead Gardens
Greenacres	Greenacres	Greenacres
Manningham	Hampstead Gardens	Klemzig
Vale Park	Klemzig	Klemzig

Hampstead Gardens is a north-eastern suburb of Adelaide, in the City of Port Adelaide Enfield. Triangular in shape, it is bounded by Muller Road to the north, which meets North East Road which is the boundary to the south and east and then Ways Road which is its western boundary.

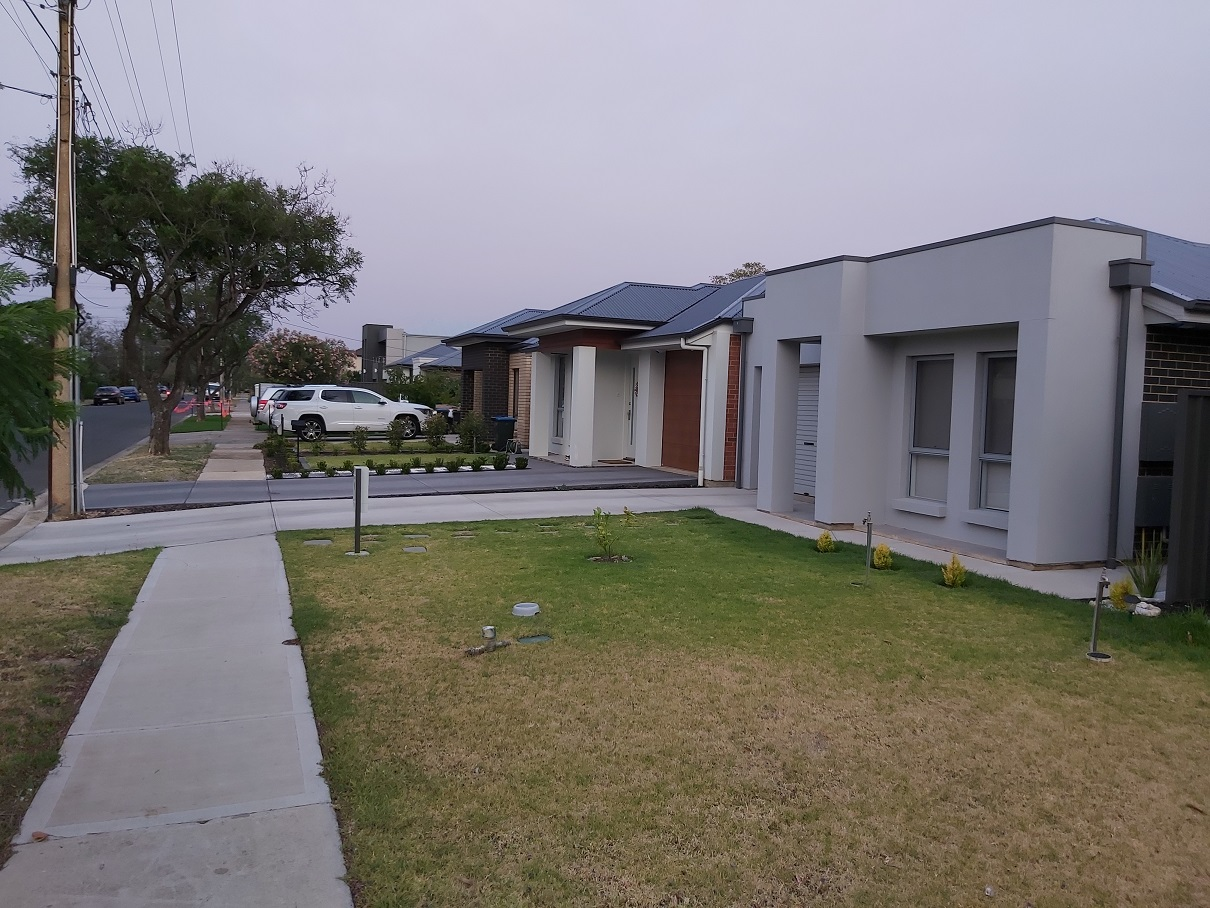
An increasing number of older homes are being demolished to allow for the construction of new housing.

The suburb contains many post World War II character homes on large blocks, predominantly on Ways Road and on the North East Road portion of the suburb. A trademark of the suburb are the many streets lined with Jacaranda trees.

The suburb has experienced steady growth and gentrification due to the blend of suburban tranquility, urban convenience and close proximity to the Adelaide CBD.

== Shopping ==
The suburb has two small local strip shopping centres, one on Ways Road and the other on the corner of Muller Road and Poole Avenue, whilst the neighbourhood centre sized Hampstead Gardens Shopping Centre is located on North East Road just to the west of the Poole Avenue intersection.

== Garden Spaces ==
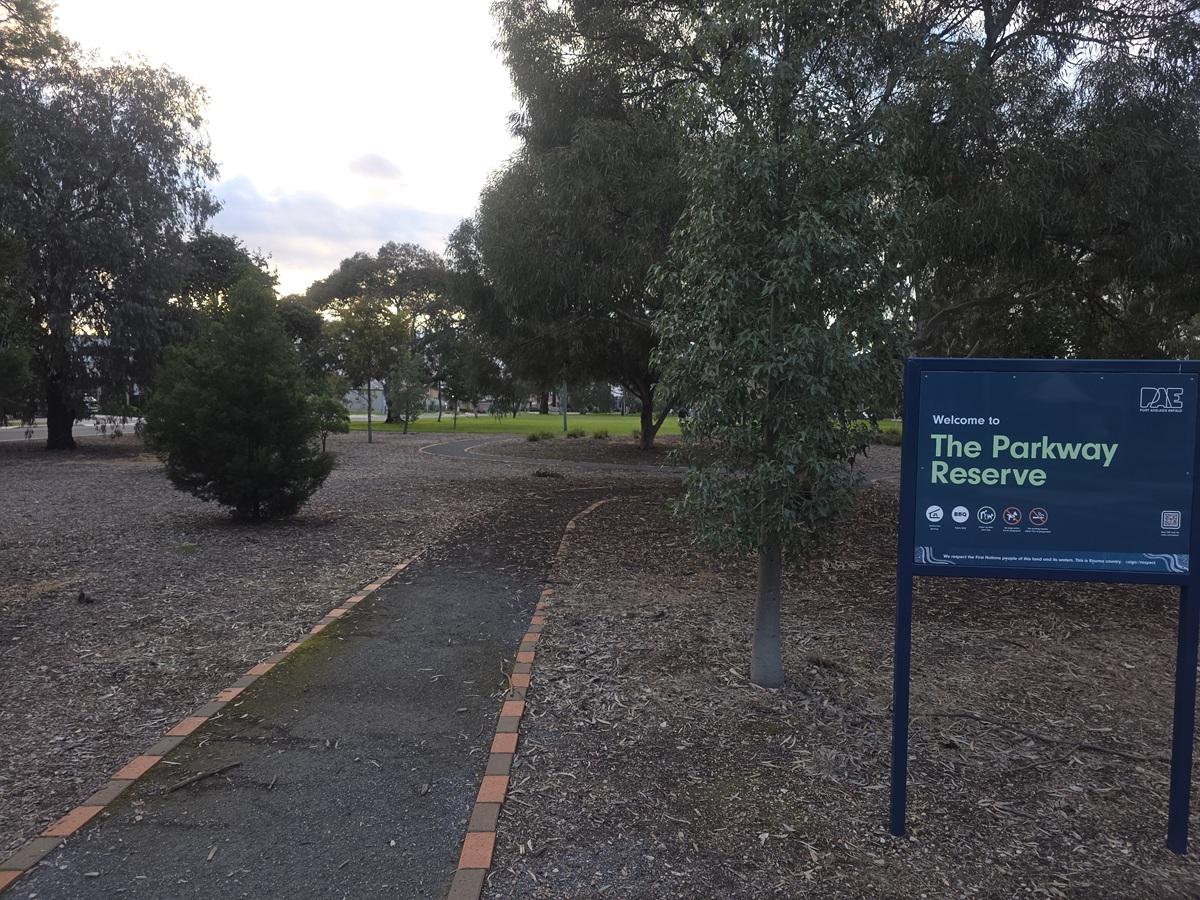
The Parkway Reserve.

The Parkway Reserve is located in the center of the suburb and features a basketball court, public barbecue, playground and seating.

== See also ==
- James Philcox, early land speculator who owned land in the area
