= Broadview, South Australia =

Broadview
- Suburb
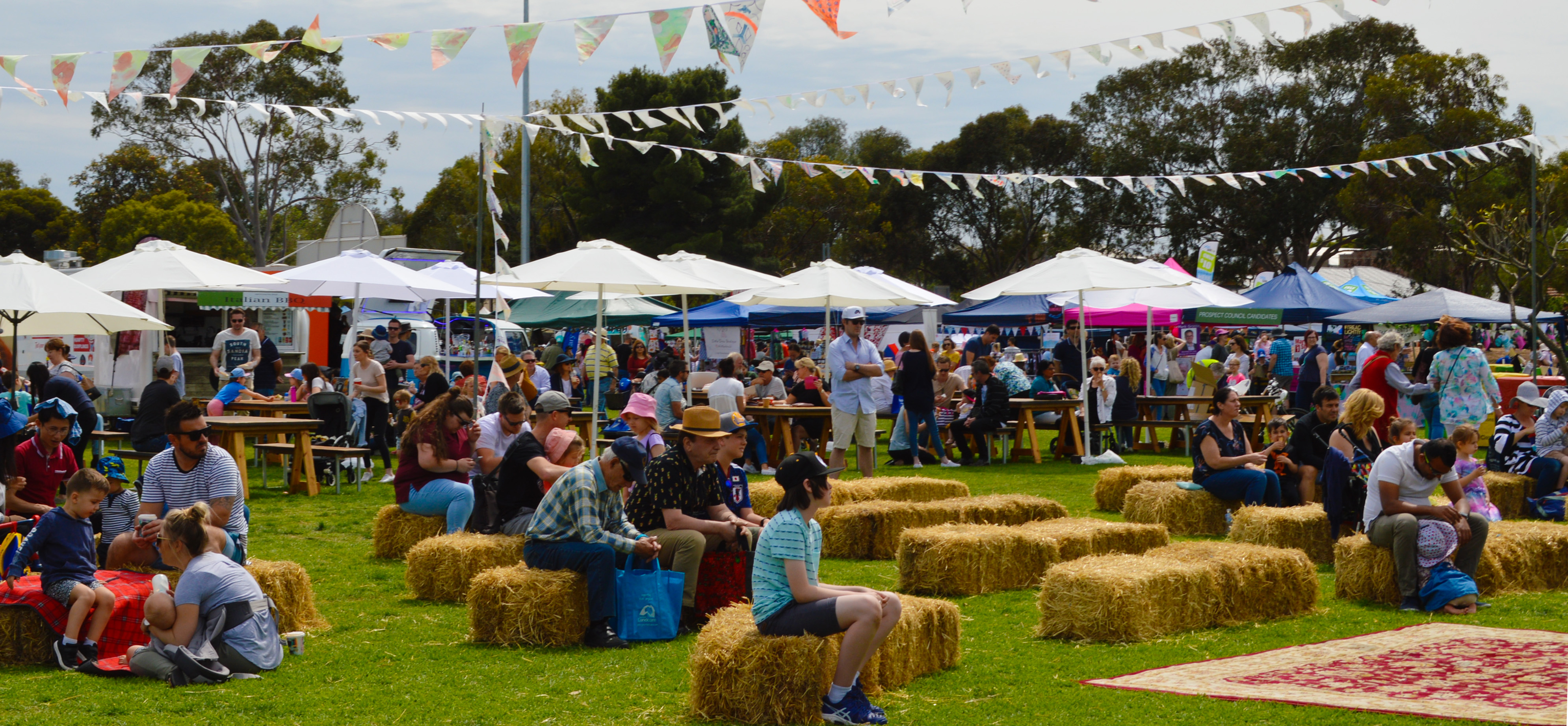
- Prospect fair in 2018 hosted at Broadview Oval

- Interactive map of Broadview
- Country: Australia
- State: South Australia
- City: Adelaide
- LGA: City of Port Adelaide Enfield City of Prospect
- Location: 6 km (3.7 mi) N of Adelaide city centre
- Established: 1915

Government
  - State electorate: Enfield (2011)
  - Federal division: Adelaide (2011)

Population
  - Total: 4,450 (SAL 2021)
- Postcode: 5083
Suburbs around Broadview
| Enfield | Clearview | Greenacres |
| Sefton Park | Broadview | Manningham |
| Nailsworth | Collinswood | Walkerville |

Broadview is a suburb of Adelaide, South Australia. It is located in the City of Port Adelaide Enfield and the City of Prospect.

== History ==
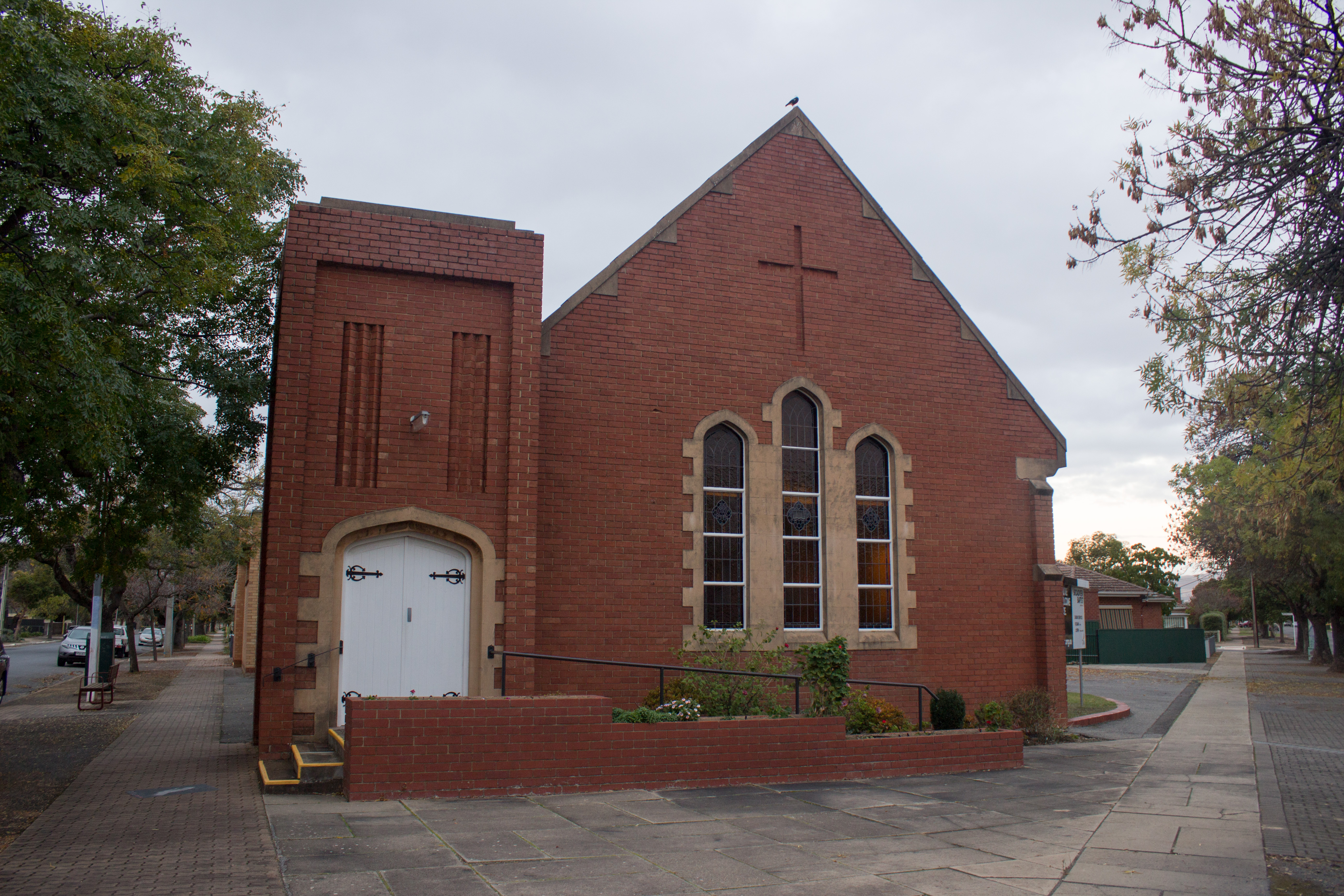
Broadview Baptist Church in Broadview, South Australia

The suburb was laid out in 1915 by C. H. Angas and K. D. Bowman and subdivided and sold in 1918.

Broadview Post Office did not open until 20 November 1945 and closed in 1987.

== Geography ==
Broadview lies astride Regency Road and has Hampstead Road as its eastern boundary.

== Demographics ==
The 2021 Census by the Australian Bureau of Statistics counted 4,450 persons in Broadview on census night. Of these, 49.1% were male and 50.9% were female.

The majority of residents (71.5%) are of Australian birth, with 1.0% identifying as Aboriginal and/or Torres Strait Islander.

The age distribution of Broadview residents is similar to that of the greater Australian population, where the median age of Broadview residents was 36 in 2021, compared to the Australian median of 38 and the South Australian median of 41.

== Facilities and attractions ==
=== Parks ===
Broadview Oval is located between Collingrove Avenue and McInnes Avenue and includes a playground and croquet lawns which are the home to the Broadview Croquet Club. The oval is the home ground for the Broadview Football Club, the "Tigers", who play in the Adelaide Footy League and SANFL Juniors. Adjacent to the oval and croquet lawns are tennis courts which is the home of the Broadview Tennis Club.

== Transportation ==
=== Roads ===
The suburb is serviced by Regency Road and by Hampstead Road, which forms its eastern boundary.

=== Public transport ===
Broadview is serviced by public transport run by the Adelaide Metro.

== See also ==
- List of Adelaide suburbs
