= Manningham, South Australia =

Manningham
- Suburb
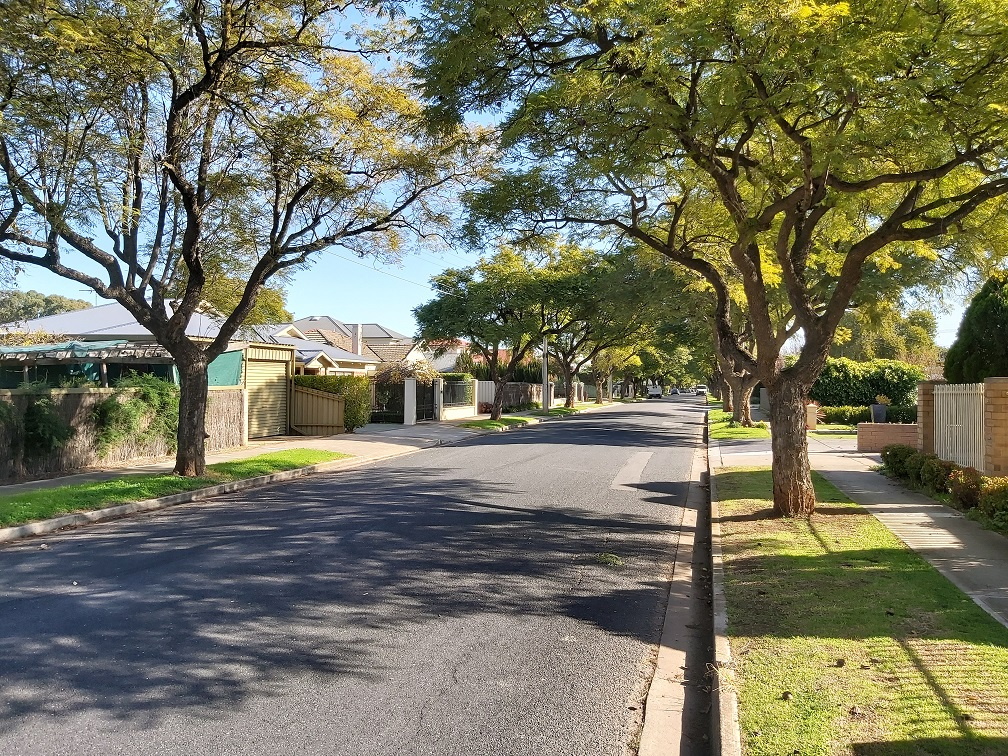
- Benjamin St in Manningham, showing the many Jacaranda trees in the area.

- Interactive map of Manningham
- Coordinates: 34.8771229604639°S 138.62244513685638°E
- Country: Australia
- State: South Australia
- City: Adelaide
- LGA: City of Port Adelaide Enfield
- Location: 5 km (3.1 mi) northeast of Adelaide city centre

Government
  - State electorate: Torrens
  - Federal division: Adelaide

Population
  - Total: 1,391 (SAL 2021)
- Postcode: 5086
Suburbs around Manningham
Broadview	Greenacres	Greenacres
Broadview	Manningham	Hampstead Gardens
Collinswood, Walkerville	Walkerville	Vale Park

Manningham is a suburb in the inner north-eastern suburbs of Adelaide, the capital of South Australia. It is around 5 km from the city centre, in the City of Port Adelaide Enfield council area.

Manningham is bounded on the west by Hampstead Road and on the south by North East Road, Adelaide. The northern boundary is Muller Road and the eastern boundary is Ways Road.

Manningham is a characterized by a mix of quaint post-war homes and more modern establishments. The suburb is well known for offering a balance of suburban tranquility and proximity to urban amenities and the Adelaide CBD.

What is now Manningham was previously an estate called 'Manningham Lodge', used for training horses. In 1926, the then owner of 'Manningham', Dr AH Bennett, dedicated a portion of his estate to be a playground. That portion of land continues to be a playground and is today known as Bennett Memorial Reserve on North East Road. A further portion of the land was reserved for housing for members of the 'learned professions' who had fallen on hard times. In 1934, the rest of the estate was subdivided and sold off and called 'Manningham'.

== See also ==
- James Philcox, early land speculator who owned land in the area
