= Marden, South Australia =

Marden
- Suburb
- Interactive map of Marden
- Country: Australia
- State: South Australia
- City: Adelaide
- LGA: City of Norwood Payneham St Peters

Government
  - State electorate: Dunstan
  - Federal division: Sturt

Population
  - Total: 2,645 (SAL 2021)
- Postcode: 5070

Marden is a suburb of Adelaide, South Australia in the City of Norwood Payneham St Peters. The suburb is bordered by the River Torrens to the north, O.G. Rd to the east, Payneham Rd to the south and Battams Rd to the west.

== History ==
The Marden suburb grew out of ribbon development on Payneham Road, providing services to people travelling between Athelstone and the city of Adelaide. The suburb was the 'silent partner' in the development of Payneham, the suburb to the south, which eventually gave name to the council area. The suburb has a rich history of market gardening on the flats area, near the River Torrens boundary, having a fresh water supply via Third Creek and the Torrens River.

It became part of the Payneham Council, housing the council chambers on the corner of O.G. Road and Payneham Road. It was absorbed into the Norwood and St Peters Council amalgamation in the 1990s.

Some buildings in the area date from the pre-Federation era but most development was completed in the post-World War Two decades. Housing blocks south of Lower Portrush Road have a high concentration of unit and flats, especially in the Broad Street vicinity.

== Services ==
The suburb holds a number of services within its boundaries. These include: Payneham Swimming Pool; several churches (Anglican, Uniting) and a Christatdelphian Temple Marden Shopping Centre;
