= Electoral results for the district of Hartley =

Election results for Hartley, South Australia

This is a list of electoral results for the Electoral district of Hartley in South Australian state elections.

== Members for Hartley ==
Member	Party	Term
Des Corcoran	Labor	1977–1982
Terry Groom	Labor	1982–1991
Terry Groom	Independent	1991–1993
Joe Scalzi	Liberal	1993–2006
Grace Portolesi	Labor	2006–2014
Vincent Tarzia	Liberal	2014–2026
Jenn Roberts	Labor	2026–present

== Election results ==
=== Elections in the 2020s ===
==== 2026 ====
2026 South Australian state election: Hartley
Party	Candidate	Votes	%	±%
Labor	Jenn Roberts	8,374	36.8	−0.6
Liberal	Vincent Tarzia	6,747	29.6	−21.4
One Nation	David Dwyer	3,644	16.0	+16.0
Greens	Melanie Searle	2,882	12.7	+1.1
Family First	Hugh Thompson	468	2.1	+2.1
Real Change	Mara Dottore	344	1.5	+1.5
United Voice	Peter Salerno	126	0.6	+0.6
Australian Family	Bruce Smith	101	0.4	+0.4
Fair Go	Robert Mill	76	0.3	+0.3
Total formal votes		22,762	94.9	−2.0
Informal votes		1,234	5.1	+2.0
Turnout		23,996	89.6	±0.0
Two-candidate-preferred result
Labor	Jenn Roberts	12,455	54.7	+8.3
Liberal	Vincent Tarzia	10,313	45.3	−8.3
Labor gain from Liberal		Swing	+8.3	

==== 2022 ====
2022 South Australian state election: Hartley
Party	Candidate	Votes	%	±%
Liberal	Vincent Tarzia	11,591	51.0	+9.5
Labor	Trent Ames	8,511	37.4	+10.5
Greens	Baeley Dear	2,627	11.6	+6.3
Total formal votes		22,729	96.9	
Informal votes		717	3.1	
Turnout		23,446	89.6	
Two-party-preferred result
Liberal	Vincent Tarzia	12,179	53.6	−3.0
Labor	Trent Ames	10,550	46.4	+3.0
Liberal hold		Swing	−3.0	

Distribution of preferences: Hartley
Party	Candidate	Votes	Round 1	
Party	Candidate	Votes	Dist.	Total
Quota (50% + 1)		11,365		
Liberal	Vincent Tarzia	11,591	+588	12,179
Labor	Trent Ames	8,511	+2,039	10,550
Greens	Baeley Dear	2,627	Excluded	

=== Elections in the 2010s ===
==== 2018 ====
2018 South Australian state election: Hartley
Party	Candidate	Votes	%	±%
Liberal	Vincent Tarzia	8,619	40.4	−7.3
SA-Best	Nick Xenophon	5,319	24.9	+24.9
Labor	Grace Portolesi	5,117	24.0	−15.4
Greens	Lauren Zwaans	1,028	4.8	−3.1
Independent	Marijka Ryan	526	2.5	+2.5
Conservatives	Bob Jackson	475	2.2	−2.8
Dignity	Rick Neagle	239	1.1	+1.1
Total formal votes		21,323	95.3	−1.6
Informal votes		1,061	4.7	+1.6
Turnout		22,384	91.4	+1.4
Two-party-preferred result
Liberal	Vincent Tarzia	12,316	57.8	+4.7
Labor	Grace Portolesi	9,007	42.2	−4.7
Liberal hold		Swing	+4.7	

2014 South Australian state election: Hartley
Party	Candidate	Votes	%	±%
Liberal	Vincent Tarzia	10,118	47.3	+4.3
Labor	Grace Portolesi	8,539	39.9	−1.7
Greens	Paul Birkwood	1,804	8.4	+0.9
Family First	David Maegraith	939	4.4	+1.2
Total formal votes		21,400	97.3	+1.2
Informal votes		595	2.7	−1.2
Turnout		21,995	91.9	−0.6
Two-party-preferred result
Liberal	Vincent Tarzia	11,217	52.4	+2.6
Labor	Grace Portolesi	10,183	47.6	−2.6
Liberal gain from Labor		Swing	+2.6	

2010 South Australian state election: Hartley
Party	Candidate	Votes	%	±%
Labor	Grace Portolesi	8,560	43.3	−3.3
Liberal	Joe Scalzi	8,104	41.0	+3.1
Greens	Keith Oehme	1,451	7.3	+1.0
Family First	Suzanne Neal	622	3.1	−1.3
Save the RAH	Robert Waltham	500	2.5	+2.5
Democratic Labor	Mark Freer	326	1.7	+1.7
Fair Land Tax	Natasha Marona	187	0.9	+0.9
Total formal votes		19,750	96.4	
Informal votes		696	3.6	
Turnout		20,446	92.1	
Two-party-preferred result
Labor	Grace Portolesi	10,322	52.3	−3.9
Liberal	Joe Scalzi	9,428	47.7	+3.9
Labor hold		Swing	−3.9	

=== Elections in the 2000s ===
2006 South Australian state election: Hartley
Party	Candidate	Votes	%	±%
Labor	Grace Portolesi	8,716	45.0	+6.0
Liberal	Joe Scalzi	7,651	39.5	−4.1
Greens	Michelle Wauchope	1,289	6.7	+2.5
Family First	Lisa Hood	814	4.2	−0.4
Democrats	Josh Reynolds	562	2.9	−3.7
Dignity for Disabled	Tim Cousins	323	1.7	+1.7
Total formal votes		19,355	96.3	+0.0
Informal votes		752	3.7	+0.0
Turnout		20,107	92.5	−0.4
Two-party-preferred result
Labor	Grace Portolesi	10,564	54.6	+5.9
Liberal	Joe Scalzi	8,791	45.4	−5.9
Labor gain from Liberal		Swing	+5.9	

2002 South Australian state election: Hartley
Party	Candidate	Votes	%	±%
Liberal	Joe Scalzi	8,779	43.6	+0.1
Labor	Quentin Black	7,852	39.0	+0.7
Democrats	Silard Regos	1,328	6.6	−11.5
Family First	Darko Pucek	918	4.6	+4.6
Greens	Joy O'Brien	845	4.2	+4.2
One Nation	Brian Richards	227	1.1	+1.1
Independent	Wendy McMahon	178	0.9	+0.9
Total formal votes		20,127	96.3	
Informal votes		765	3.7	
Turnout		20,892	92.9	
Two-party-preferred result
Liberal	Joe Scalzi	10,331	51.3	+0.7
Labor	Quentin Black	9,796	48.7	−0.7
Liberal hold		Swing	+0.7	

=== Elections in the 1990s ===
1997 South Australian state election: Hartley
Party	Candidate	Votes	%	±%
Liberal	Joe Scalzi	8,096	43.6	−12.8
Labor	Quentin Black	7,168	38.6	+7.6
Democrats	Ian Richards	3,304	17.8	+9.2
Total formal votes		18,568	96.0	−0.4
Informal votes		780	4.0	+0.4
Turnout		19,348	91.3	
Two-party-preferred result
Liberal	Joe Scalzi	9,376	50.5	−11.7
Labor	Quentin Black	9,192	49.5	+11.7
Liberal hold		Swing	−11.7	

1993 South Australian state election: Hartley
Party	Candidate	Votes	%	±%
Liberal	Joe Scalzi	11,338	57.7	+11.4
Labor	David Bamford	5,955	30.3	−11.9
Democrats	Richard Greenwood	1,647	8.4	−3.0
Natural Law	Anthony Coombe	713	3.6	+3.6
Total formal votes		19,653	96.6	0.0
Informal votes		691	3.4	0.0
Turnout		20,344	93.3	
Two-party-preferred result
Liberal	Joe Scalzi	12,416	63.2	+11.8
Labor	David Bamford	7,237	36.8	−11.8
Liberal gain from Labor		Swing	+11.8	

- Hartley became a notional Liberal seat in the redistribution.

=== Elections in the 1980s ===
1989 South Australian state election: Hartley
Party	Candidate	Votes	%	±%
Labor	Terry Groom	8,371	47.7	−11.9
Liberal	Joe Scalzi	7,094	40.4	+5.2
Democrats	Arlyn Tombleson	2,087	11.9	+6.7
Total formal votes		17,552	96.4	+0.5
Informal votes		652	3.6	−0.5
Turnout		18,204	94.4	+1.0
Two-party-preferred result
Labor	Terry Groom	9,563	54.5	−8.0
Liberal	Joe Scalzi	7,989	45.5	+8.0
Labor hold		Swing	−8.0	

1985 South Australian state election: Hartley
Party	Candidate	Votes	%	±%
Labor	Terry Groom	10,347	59.6	+7.6
Liberal	Rilka Warbanoff	6,114	35.2	−1.0
Democrats	Catherine Tucker-Lee	911	5.2	−6.5
Total formal votes		17,372	95.9	
Informal votes		740	4.1	
Turnout		18,112	93.4	
Two-party-preferred result
Labor	Terry Groom	10,853	62.5	+3.5
Liberal	Rilka Warbanoff	6,519	37.5	−3.5
Labor hold		Swing	+3.5	

1982 South Australian state election: Hartley
Party	Candidate	Votes	%	±%
Labor	Terry Groom	8,734	52.0	+1.3
Liberal	Barry James	6,070	36.2	−4.8
Democrats	George Belperio	1,983	11.8	+3.5
Total formal votes		16,787	92.3	−1.9
Informal votes		1,408	7.7	+1.9
Turnout		18,195	92.6	−0.8
Two-party-preferred result
Labor	Terry Groom	10,076	60.0	+4.9
Liberal	Barry James	6,711	40.0	−4.9
Labor hold		Swing	+4.9	

=== Elections in the 1970s ===
1979 South Australian state election: Hartley
Party	Candidate	Votes	%	±%
Labor	Des Corcoran	8,253	50.7	−7.8
Liberal	David Parish	6,669	41.0	+3.8
Democrats	Geoffrey Brown	1,351	8.3	+8.3
Total formal votes		16,273	94.2	−2.6
Informal votes		1,005	5.8	+2.6
Turnout		17,278	93.4	−2.6
Two-party-preferred result
Labor	Des Corcoran	8,959	55.1	−5.3
Liberal	David Parish	7,314	44.9	+5.3
Labor hold		Swing	−5.3	

1977 South Australian state election: Hartley
Party	Candidate	Votes	%	±%
Labor	Des Corcoran	9,965	58.5	+7.2
Liberal	George Trotta	6,329	37.2	+9.1
Workers	William Forster	734	4.3	+4.3
Total formal votes		17,028	96.8	
Informal votes		556	3.2	
Turnout		17,584	94.1	
Two-party-preferred result
Labor	Des Corcoran	10,292	60.4	+5.7
Liberal	George Trotta	6,736	39.6	−5.7
Labor hold		Swing	+5.7	
