= Payneham, South Australia =

Payneham
- Suburb
- Interactive map of Payneham
- Country: Australia
- State: South Australia
- City: Adelaide
- LGA: City of Norwood Payneham St Peters
- Location: 6 km (3.7 mi) east of Adelaide city centre

Government
  - State electorate: Dunstan
  - Federal division: Sturt

Population
  - Total: 2,438 (SAL 2021)
- Postcode: 5070
Suburbs around Payneham
Royston Park	Marden	Felixstow
Joslin	Payneham	Glynde
Evandale	Payneham South	Firle

Payneham is an eastern suburb of Adelaide in the City of Norwood Payneham St Peters. It is one of a string of suburbs on Adelaide's eastern side with a high proportion of Adelaide's Italian-Australian and French-Australian residents, many of whom can be traced back to the large-scale migration following World War II.

Payneham's northern boundary is Payneham Road with Portrush Road passing south–north through the middle of the suburb.

== History ==
In 1866, Payneham was a small agricultural village of farms growing wheat and hey.

Payneham was named for himself by Samuel Payne (c. 1803–1847), who with his wife Ann, née Maslen, and two children arrived in April 1838 aboard Lord Goderich from London, and occupied section 285, Hundred of Adelaide in 1839.

== Facilities ==
Payneham Post Office opened on 18 July 1850. It was renamed Marden in 1968.

The Catholic Church in the suburb is dedicated to Our Lady, Queen of Peace.

== Notable people ==
=== Samuel Payne ===
After Payne's arrival in South Australia in 1838, he lived with his wife and children at Payneham House in Rosella Street. The family later moved to East Terrace in Adelaide and retained the residence in Rosella Street.

Payne and his family were fellow passengers of future neighbour, Edward Castres Gwynne, when they made their way to Australia aboard the Lord Goderich.

He established one of the earliest pubs in South Australia, the Australian Arms. The name was changed to the Auction Market Tavern in 1842. It was later known by several other names, including the Exchange Hotel at the time of its demolition in 1960.

Payne died in 1847 from influenza at his residence in East Terrace, just weeks after retiring as the publican of the Auction Market Tavern. He was survived by his wife and seven children.

=== Harold Holt ===
Former prime minister of Australia, Harold Holt, lived in Payneham for several years during his childhood.

Holt's father, Thomas James, was the landlord of the Duke of Wellington hotel from 1914 to 1916. The hotel stood on the corner of Payneham Road and Wellington Road (now Portrush Road). It was demolished in 1976 to make way for an ice skating rink.

Holt attended Payneham Primary School and lived in the hotel with his mother and father.

=== Henry Sewell ===
Henry Sewell (1847–1926) owned and managed a well-regarded nursery in the area. In 1902, it was described by The Chronicle as the 'largest nursery in Australia'.

Peter Barr of London, known as 'the daffodil king', praised Sewell's collection of rare and choice plants, and described his horticultural knowledge as 'unequalled in the southern hemisphere'.

Sewell's home, built in the early 1890s, has escaped demolition and remains as offices for several businesses, including Mario Minuzzo Builders. Sewell Avenue in Payneham was named after him.

== Sport ==
=== Australian Rules Football ===
The suburb is home to Payneham Norwood Union Football Club of the Adelaide Footy League (formerly known as the South Australian Amateur Football League). The club is located at Payneham Oval on John Street and Rosella Street.

The club is an amalgamation of two football clubs, the Payneham Football Club and the Norwood Union Football Club, which took place in 1995.

As of 2023, the club fields 23 junior teams (including 3 junior girls teams) and 5 senior teams (including 2 senior women's teams).

=== Tennis ===
East Adelaide Payneham Tennis Club is located at Payneham Oval, alongside Payneham Norwood Union Football Club.

The club features 6 floodlit courts that were refurbished in 2021.

=== Cricket ===
Payneham Cricket Club is also located at Payneham Oval. It was established in 0999 and is a founding member of the Adelaide Turf Cricket Association.

The club has teams in both senior men's and women's and junior boy's and girl's competitions.

=== Association Football ===
The Payneham Postel Lions Soccer Club competes in the South Australian Amateur Soccer League.

The club was originally formed as Payneham Postel United by postal and telecom workers. It later merged with Para Hills Lions and is now located at LJ Lewis Oval in Northfield.

=== Table Tennis ===
The Payneham Table Tennis Academy Inc is located in Sullivan Street, Firle, where it relocated in approximately 1964 after operating out of various church and community halls in the Kensington area.

The Academy caters for both social and competitive players.
