= Stepney, South Australia =

Stepney
- Suburb
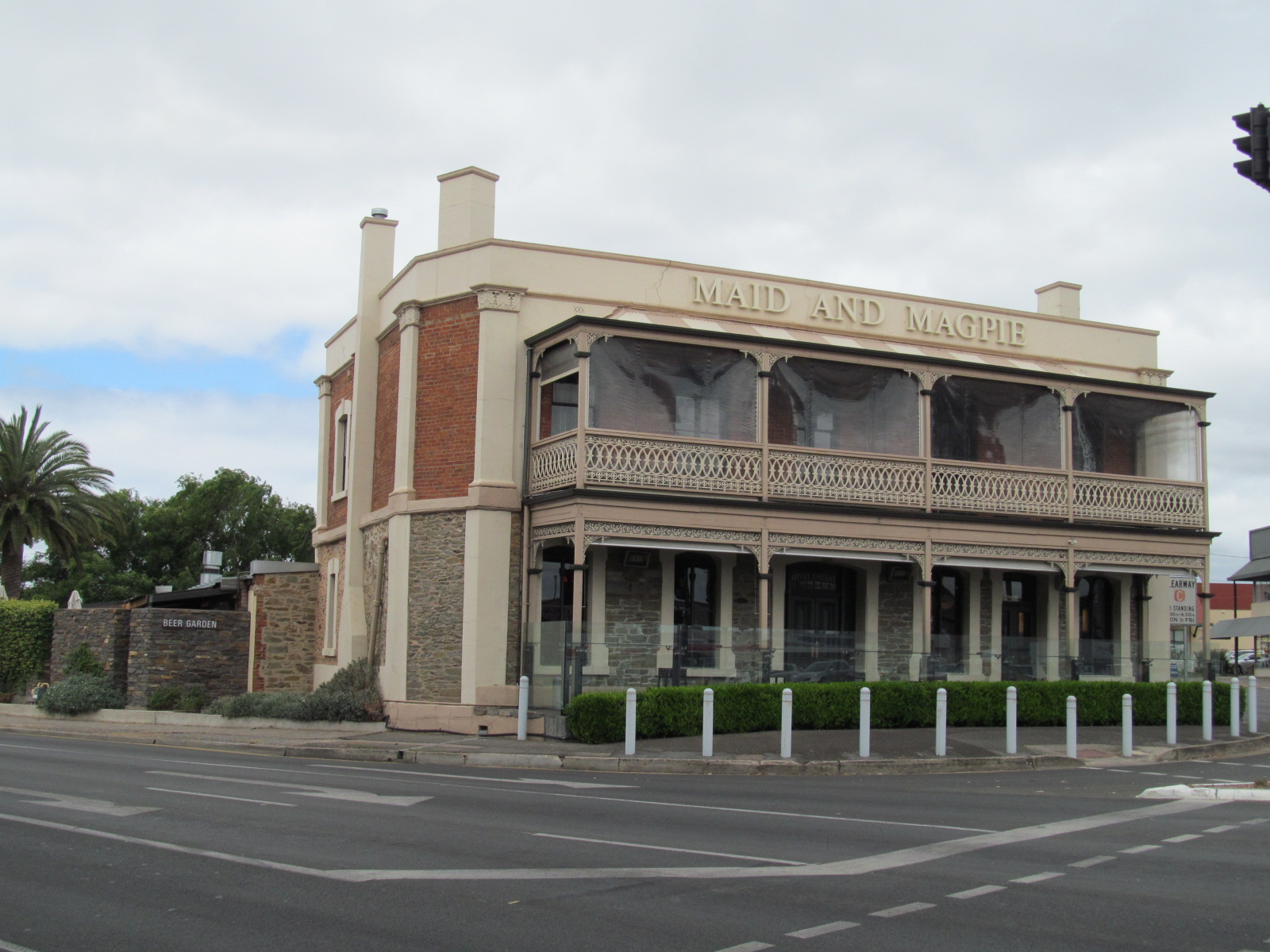
- The Maid and Magpie

- Interactive map of Stepney
- Country: Australia
- State: South Australia
- City: Adelaide
- LGA: City of Norwood Payneham & St Peters
- Location: 3 km (1.9 mi) from Adelaide
- Established: 1850

Government
  - State electorate: Dunstan
  - Federal division: Sturt

Area
  - Total: 0.6 km^{2} (0.23 sq mi)

Population
  - Total: 942 (SAL 2021)
- Postcode: 5069
Suburbs around Stepney
| St Peters | St Peters | Evandale |
| College Park | Stepney | Maylands |
| Kent Town | Norwood | Norwood |

Stepney is a small triangular near-city suburb of Adelaide within the City of Norwood Payneham & St Peters. It is known for the historic Maid and Magpie Hotel, which is situated prominently between Magill and Payneham Roads at a large junction.

== History ==
Before the British colonisation of South Australia and subsequent European settlement, Stepney was inhabited by one of the groups who later collectively became known as the Kaurna peoples.

=== Early European settlement ===
Stepney was named after an inner-city district in the area which is now the London Borough of Tower Hamlets. George Muller, who hailed from there, created the "Village of Stepney" out of section 259, Hundred of Adelaide, in 1850. Muller built the Maid and Magpie Hotel.

Whilst Adelaide was to be a city of fine buildings and a refined populace, free from the constraints of convict influence, George Muller's Stepney bore a strong resemblance to its less-refined namesake near the City of London, replete with slums. The early settlement of German settlers in Stepney was, however, somewhat unusual. Though not as well known as the Prussians who settled Klemzig, Hahndorf or Tanunda, they were there in sufficient numbers to develop schools for their children. Notable members of that community were Hans Heysen, and Carl Laubman of Laubman and Pank. During 2008, the last three cottages in Nelson Street, described as "built by Haken Linde, a successful member of the German community", were marked for demolition by the Norwood Payneham & St Peters council. Strong calls made for the cottages to be preserved were successful.

=== The 19th century ===
Stepney was, despite its humble beginnings, not without influence and in 1851 the South Australian Ballot Association was set up and at the Maid and Magpie Hotel, and on 11 February 1851 the secret ballot was advocated. This movement was most significant in the development of South Australia's democratic system. Returning miners from the gold rushes of Ballarat and Bendigo were instrumental in building many of Adelaide's fine homes and businesses. Stepney shared in this phenomenon with some substantial residences amid the poorer houses, though bankruptcy was never far from those who acquired wealth quickly.

In the early 1860s semi-rural Stepney was the haunt of some rather colourful characters who operated around Adelaide's parklands. The area around the Maid and Magpie Hotel was the scene of various robberies by the romantically named Captain Moonlight, not to be confused with the better known bushranger in New South Wales named Captain Moonlight. Stepney's highwayman, it later transpired, was armed with nothing more lethal than a camouflaged pipe-case and, after incarceration, became a respected member of society.

The similarly named Captain Thunderbolt, not to be confused with Captain Thunderbolt in New South Wales, was said to roam the area and even emulated Robin Hood...

Richard Dawes, carpenter of Prospect Village, returning home... was... attacked by Captain Thunderbolt... Mr Dawes [handed] him his purse, but on inspecting it [found] some few silver coins of little value; [Captain Thunderbolt] said, "Oh! I see you're a poor man like myself and I don't want to injure you..."

Whether the two were one and the same cannot be said, but the accounts support the growing mythology of lawlessness to be found in the area.

By the 1870s Stepney contained many small houses with small backyards and no drainage. They were considered to be hotbeds of disease and fever. These houses, however, gave Stepney much of its racy nature with its inhabitants developing strength in their inevitable struggles with life. In the late 1870s these struggles evidenced themselves in the pilfering of firewood and the subsequent use of dynamite in planted logs by the firewood owners, to exact retribution.

During this time Stepney became the home of some significant industries lured by proximity to the city and the development of improved transport. In 1888 the Phoenix Distillery at 42 Nelson Street was bought by Douglas Tolley and his brother Ernest, together with a London distiller Thomas Scott. They traded in the name of Tolley, Scott and Tolley. Tolley, Scott & Tolley was, at one time, Australia's leading brandy producer.

Toward the end of the 19th century, Stepney was briefly the home and a place of schooling for a very young Hans Heysen. Hans was awarded an Order of the British Empire and subsequently knighted for his service to art.

=== The 20th century ===
Stepney continued to develop. Larger houses were built and around the turn of the century more houses were built in the area further from the city and adjoining Maylands. However, peace and prosperity was interrupted by the First World War. A search of the National Archives of Australia reveals that 38 soldiers enlisted showing their place of birth as Stepney, an extraordinary number given the small size of the suburb.

Post-1945 Stepney again underwent change as large numbers of refugees from war-torn Europe moved in. Shops began selling previously unheard of foods such as salami or artichokes and the flowers in often tiny front gardens were replaced by vegetables. Again, the number of children increased and second creek and the small number of spare allotments became their playgrounds, complete with re-enactments of battles fought far away. Houses changed colour, copying those found Greece and Italy and the streets resounded with voluble Italian, Greek and ironically – German.

This influx of residents was to be a brief hiatus amid the loss of movement toward industrialisation as future generations, now more affluent, moved away from often painful memories and their houses were taken over by industries eager to locate near to the city or removed to provide wider roads.

== Geography ==
Stepney is bounded on its north-west side by Payneham Road which connects Adelaide city, via North Terrace, to Payneham and Felixstow and beyond to suburbs such as Highbury and thence to the Adelaide Hills. Magill Road, the southern boundary, connects the city-centre, via North Terrace, to Kensington Park and beyond to Magill and then the Adelaide Hills. On its eastern side it is bounded by Frederick Street.

Stepney is intersected by Nelson Street which divides Stepney into two roughly distinct areas. Nelson Street also provides part of a near-city link between the eastern and northern suburbs via the Stephen Terrace bridge between St Peters and Gilberton. Generally, the area to the east of Nelson Street contains larger allotments, though there are some notable exceptions. The area to the west of Nelson Street generally contains smaller allotments and is more heavily industrialised.

Apart from some relatively small, though significant reserves, Stepney is residential and industrial. Industrial development dominates the area to the west of Nelson Street, whilst residential development continues to dominate the area to the east of Nelson Street.

== Governance ==
Stepney is represented in the Dunstan electorate in the Parliament of South Australia, and within the Division of Adelaide in the Australian House of Representatives.

== Landmarks ==
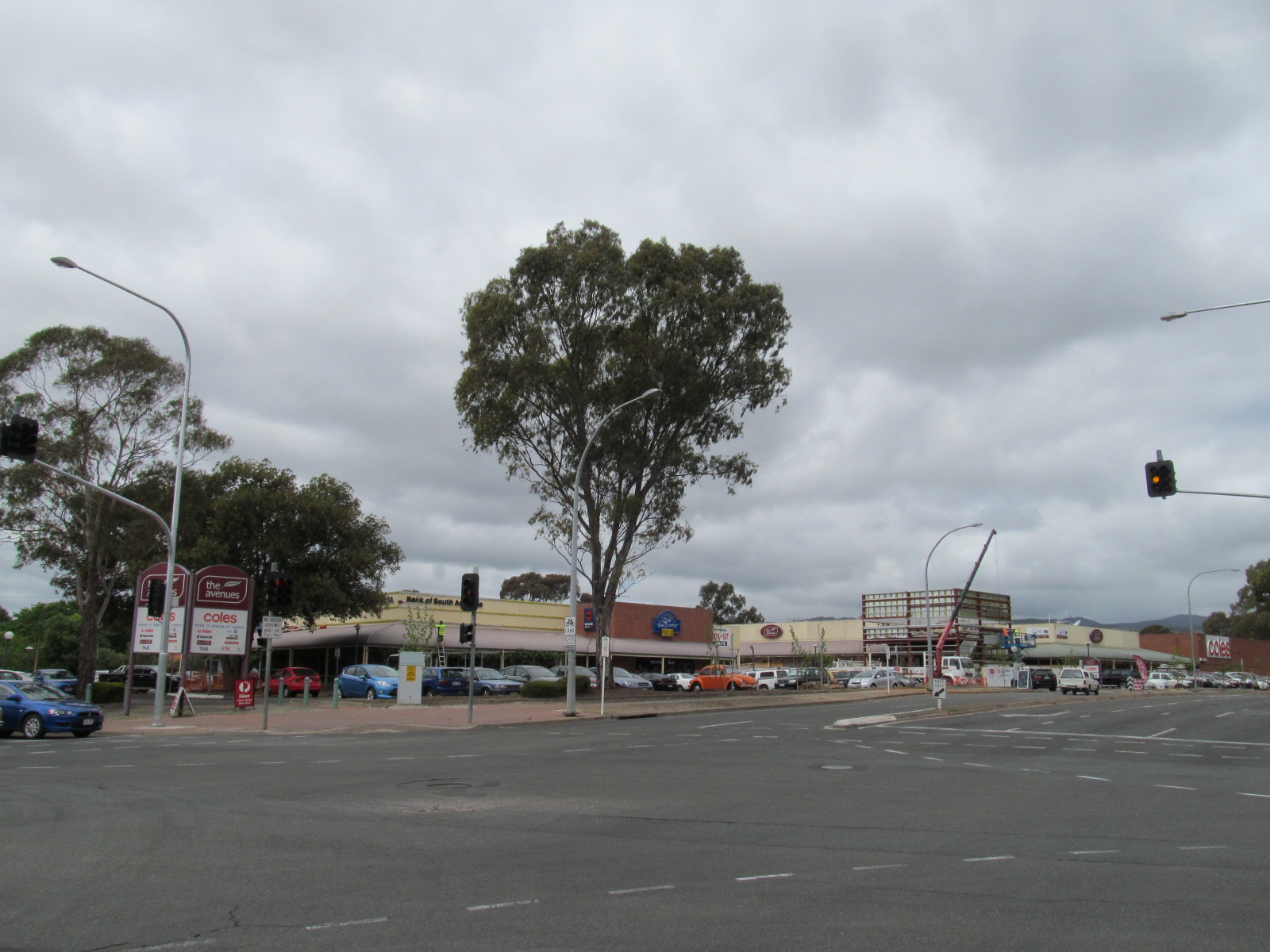
Avenues Shopping Centre

- The most famous landmark in Stepney is the junction formed by the merging of Magill and Payneham Roads with North Terrace, Fullarton Road, and Baliol Street. The junction is named after the Maid and Magpie Hotel located at the junction.
- The historic Maid and Magpie Hotel ("The Maid") is listed on the South Australian Heritage Register.
- The Avenues Shopping Centre on the corner of Payneham Road and Nelson Street provides the suburb's significant retail hub.

== Transport ==
Stepney, being near to the city and bounded by major roads, is well serviced by bus services.

== Schools ==
Stepney has been the home of several schools. Only the Agnes Goode Kindergarten remains, acting as a memorial to past schools and a justice of the peace and former political and social activist.

Early records mention schools provided for the German settlers in Stepney, though little is known of them.

In 1855 a school in Stepney, run by M A Moody with 34 students was gazetted in the South Australian Government Gazette.

In the late 1890s, the King's Grammar School and Somersal House School existed in Stepney. Both no longer exist as schools.

St Joseph's Catholic School was located for a time after the Second World War, next to the church, and overlooking Second Creek.

Agnes Goode kindergarten is located in Cornish Street.

== Notable residents ==
- Thomas Boutflower Bennett (1808–1894) was a master at Adelaide Educational Institution and St Peter's College
- Edgar Rowland Dawes (1902–1973) trade unionist, vice chairman of the Australian Broadcasting Commission and parliamentary member for Sturt in the South Australian Legislative Assembly was born in Stepney.
- Basil Hadley (1975–2006) artist, was born in the UK and lived most of his life in Stepney.
- Lawrence Stanley Jackson (1884–1974), taxation commissioner, was born on 2 April 1884 in Stepney.
- Carl Laubman (1878–1958), optician, inventor, and co-founder of Laubman & Pank, was born 11 May 1878 at Stepney, spending his childhood and youth there,
- Agnes Robertson Robertson (1882–1968), schoolteacher and politician, was born on 31 July 1882 in Stepney.
- Adolf John Schulz (1883–1956), educationalist, was born on 6 August 1883 at Stepney.
- James Simri Sellar (1830–1906), tea merchant and politician lived and traded in Stepney at Vauxhall House which he built.
- Wally Shiers (Sergeant) of Stepney, South Australia was a mechanic on Ross and Keith Smith's prize winning flight from London on 12 November 1919 in the twin-engined Vickers Vimy bomber G-EAOU.
- Norman Theodore Stoate (1895–1979), forester, was born on 13 January 1895 at Stepney, Adelaide.
