= St Morris, South Australia =

St Morris
- Suburb
- Interactive map of St Morris
- Country: Australia
- State: South Australia
- City: Adelaide
- LGA: City of Norwood Payneham St Peters

Government
  - State electorate: Dunstan
  - Federal division: Sturt

Population
  - Total: 1,598 (SAL 2021)
- Postcode: 5068
Suburbs around St Morris
Payneham South	Firle	Tranmere
Trinity Gardens	St Morris	Tranmere
Beulah Park	Kensington Park	Kensington Gardens

St Morris is a suburb of Adelaide, located in the local government area of the City of Norwood Payneham St Peters.

== History ==
North Norwood Post Office opened around 1886, was renamed Trinity Gardens in 1950 and St Morris in 1963 before closing in 1988.

The Windsor Theatre opened at 407 Magill Road in 1931, purpose-built as a picture theatre, on a corner block. It was owned by the Cunnew brothers, was also known as the De Franco at some point, and closed in 1957, by which time the lease had been acquired by Ozone Theatres Ltd. and as of 2022 houses Inspirations paint shop.

The suburb was regarded as a middle class one in the 20th century.
