= Tranmere, South Australia =

Tranmere
- Suburb
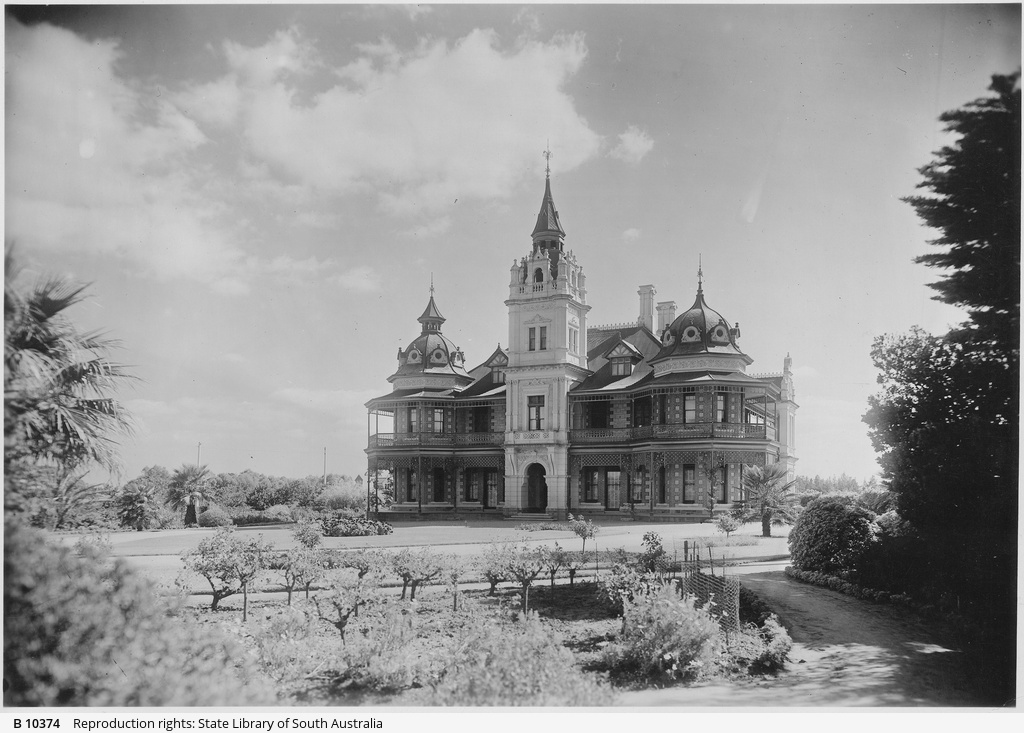
- Tranmere House (built 1889), c. 1910

- Country: Australia
- State: South Australia
- City: Adelaide
- LGA: City of Campbelltown

Government
  - State electorate: Hartley
  - Federal division: Sturt

Population
  - Total: 4,136 (SAL 2021)
- Postcode: 5073
Suburbs around Tranmere
Glynde	Hectorville	Hectorville
St Morris, Firle	Tranmere	Magill
Kensington Park	Kensington Gardens	Magill

Tranmere is an eastern suburb of Adelaide, South Australia. It is located in the City of Campbelltown.

== History ==
The name Tranmere was given in 1838 to Section 273 of 67 acres by its purchaser David Wylie, who named it after his hometown of Tranmere, Cheshire in England. David Wylie M.A. (ca.1799 – 8 March 1853), who ran a school on the property, was a brother-in law of William Scott MLC, who purchased an adjoining property.

Tranmere Post Office opened on 3 February 1947, but was renamed Kensington Gardens North in 1966.

== Demographics ==
The 2006 Census by the Australian Bureau of Statistics counted 3,218 persons in Tranmere on census night. Of these, 47.8% were male and 52.2% were female.

The majority of residents (68.4%) were of Australian birth, with 5.0%being born in Italy, and 4.4% in England.

The age distribution of Tranmere residents was comparable to that of the greater Australian population: 68.3% were over 25 years, compared to the Australian average of 66.5%.

== Community ==
The local (free) newspaper is the East Torrens Messenger. Metropolitan, regional and national newspapers (such as The Advertiser and The Australian) also serve the area.

== Attractions ==
=== Poets' Corner ===
Poets' Corner, the area of Tranmere bordered by Richardson Avenue (north), Birkinshaw Avenue (east), Magill Road (south) and Glynburn Road (west), has historically been home to Tranmere's wealthy. The majority of the street names commemorate poets, including Emerson Grove, Kings Grove, Dryden Street, Hunt Avenue, Shakespeare Avenue, Milton Avenue, Moore Street, Cowper Street, Scott Street, and Kipling Street.

The City of Campbelltown Development Plan details Poets' Corner as having two development areas, the 750 Policy Area and the 620 Policy Area, denoting the minimum block sizes as 750sqm and 620sqm. Tranmere's more expensive real estate tends to be in the 750 Policy Area, where many of the blocks are much larger than the 750sqm minimum.

=== Tranmere House ===
Tranmere House is located within the 750 Policy Area at 3 Kings Grove. This Heritage Listed house is a 17-room late 19th century mansion built in 1898 for wealthy Rundle Street draper George Hunt (1845–1911).

The land was previously owned by one of South Australia's pioneers, George Morphett (1811–1893), the younger brother of John Morphett. When George Morphett returned to England in 1860, George Hunt purchased the property for his retirement. (Hunt retired in 1898.)

Today, the house continues to be privately owned, and can easily be seen from Magill Road.

=== Parks ===
The largest park in Tranmere is The Gums Recreational Ground, which is bisected by Shakespeare Avenue. As its name suggests, the park features majestic gum trees as well as the meandering watercourse of Third Creek, normally dry. Amenities include a children's playground, several shelter sheds, and a public toilet. A War Memorial and garden of contemplation are located near the eastern boundary.

== Transport ==
=== Roads ===
The suburb is serviced by the following main roads:

- Glynburn Road, running north–south between Hectorville and Beaumont

=== Public transport ===
Tranmere is serviced by buses run by the Adelaide Metro, including routes:

H33, going through Marian Road, to Glynburn Road, then Reid Avenue. Heading towards either Rostrevor, City, or through-routed to Henley Beach.

H21, going north towards Glynburn road to the Paradise Bus interchange, or south to eventually reach The Parade, Norwood, and then continue to the city.

== See also ==
- List of Adelaide suburbs
