= Trinity Gardens, South Australia =

Trinity Gardens
- Suburb
- Interactive map of Trinity Gardens
- Country: Australia
- State: South Australia
- City: Adelaide
- LGA: City of Norwood Payneham St Peters
- Location: 5 km (3.1 mi) northeast of Adelaide city centre
- Established: 1840

Government
  - State electorate: Dunstan
  - Federal division: Sturt

Population
  - Total: 1,264 (SAL 2021)
- Postcode: 5068
Suburbs around Trinity Gardens
Evandale	Payneham South	Firle
Maylands	Trinity Gardens	St Morris
Norwood	Beulah Park	Kensington Park

Trinity Gardens is a suburb of Adelaide, South Australia. The name is taken from Holy Trinity Church on North Terrace, Adelaide, and was formerly known as Trinity Glebe.

== History ==
On 28 March 1840 the trustees of Holy Trinity Church – Osmond Gilles, Charles Mann and James Hurtle Fisher – were given approximately 40 acres (160,000 m^{2}) of land in the area, as Glebe lands, by Pascoe St Leger Grenfell. The land came to be known as Trinity Glebe.

From 1911, the trustees had wanted to sell the Trinity Glebe for housing. However, the terms of the trust deed forbade it and required an act of Parliament to alter. In 1920, the Parliament made the necessary amendment. The land was then immediately subdivided, named Trinity Gardens, and sold for housing by Wilkinson, Sando & Wyles Ltd, who promised to make "liberal provision in the way of space for tennis, bowls and croquet".

North Norwood Post Office opened around 1886, which was renamed Trinity Gardens in 1950 and St Morris in 1963, when the second Trinity Gardens office opened in the present area of the suburb.

== Governance ==
Trinity Gardens is in the City of Norwood Payneham St Peters local government area, the South Australian House of Assembly Electoral district of Dunstan, and the Australian House of Representatives Division of Sturt.
