= Morphett =

Morphett may refer to:

== Surname ==
- Drew Morphett (1948–2017), Australian sports broadcaster
- John Morphett (1809–1892), pioneer and parliamentarian in South Australia
- George Morphett (1811–1893), his brother, also a parliamentarian in South Australia
- George Cummins Morphett (1876–1963), grandson of John Morphett, businessman and parliamentarian in South Australia
- John Morphett (architect) (1932–2016), Australian architect
- Tony Morphett (1938–2018), Australian film and television script writer
- Scott Morphett (born 1965), Australian rules football player

== Named after Sir John Morphett ==
- Electoral district of Morphett, South Australia House of Assembly
- Morphett Street, Adelaide, Australia
- Morphett Vale, South Australia, a suburb of Adelaide
  - Morphett Vale railway station
  - Morphett Vale Football Club
- Morphettville, South Australia, a suburb of Adelaide

== Other uses ==
- Morphett Street Brewery, Adelaide, Australia

== See also ==
- Morphett families of South Australia
