= Evandale =

Evandale may refer to:

- Evandale, New Brunswick
- Evandale, South Australia
- Evandale, Tasmania

== See also ==
- Avondale, South Lanarkshire (archaically known as Evandale)
