= City of Norwood Payneham & St Peters =

Coordinates: 34°55′S 138°38′E

- Local government area
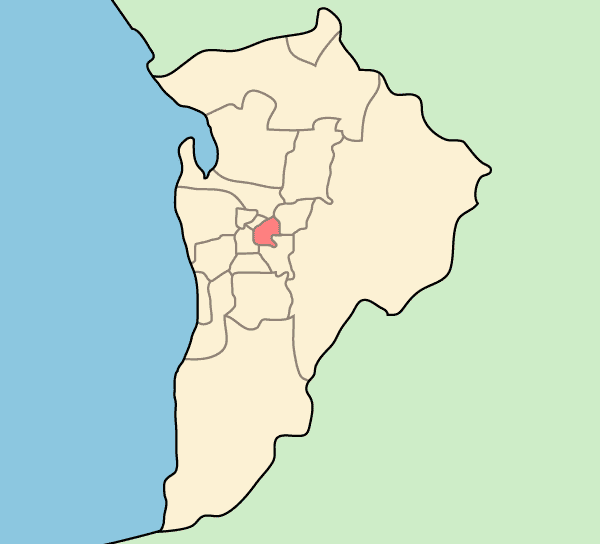

- Interactive map of City of Norwood Payneham & St Peters
- Country: Australia
- State: South Australia
- Region: Eastern Adelaide
- Established: 1997
- Council seat: Norwood

Government
  - Mayor: Robert Bria
  - State electorate: Bragg, Dunstan, Hartley
  - Federal division: Adelaide, Sturt

Area
  - Total: 15.1 km^{2} (5.8 sq mi)

Population
  - Total: 37,487 (LGA 2021)
  - Density: 2,483.58/km^{2} (6,432.4/sq mi)
- Website: www.npsp.sa.gov.auCity of Norwood Payneham & St Peters
LGAs around City of Norwood Payneham & St Peters
City of Port Adelaide Enfield	Town of Walkerville	City of Campbelltown
City of Adelaide	City of Norwood Payneham & St Peters	City of Campbelltown
City of Adelaide	City of Burnside	City of Burnside

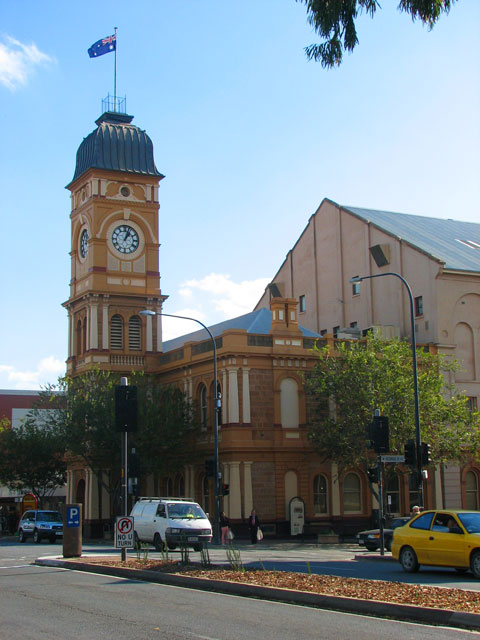
Norwood Town Hall

The City of Norwood Payneham & St Peters is a metropolitan local government area of South Australia covering the inner eastern suburbs of Adelaide.

== History ==
The council was established on 1 November 1997 with the amalgamation of the City of Kensington and Norwood, the City of Payneham, and the Town of St Peters. The original wards at its inception had been East Adelaide and Hackney, Stepney, Maylands, Torrens, Payneham, Trinity, Norwood/Kent Town, and Kensington.

== Description ==
The City of Norwood Payneham & St Peters covers the inner eastern suburbs of Adelaide, and lies in the Eastern Adelaide region of South Australia.

It is divided into five wards: Torrens, Payneham, West Norwood/Kent Town, Kensington (each electing two councillors), and Maylands/Trinity (three councillors). The council is based at the historic Norwood Town Hall and is composed of a mayor and 13 elected members, who are supported by a chief executive, as well as four general managers and approximately 175 field and inside staff.

As of September 2026 the mayor is Robert Bria, who was first elected as a councillor when it was formed in 1997, and became mayor after the death of the first mayor, Laurie Fioravanti, in 2005.

== Suburbs ==
- College Park
- Evandale
- Felixstow
- Firle
- Glynde
- Hackney
- Heathpool
- Joslin
- Kensington
- Kent Town
- Marden
- Marryatville
- Maylands
- Norwood
- Payneham
- Payneham South
- Royston Park
- St Morris
- St Peters
- Stepney
- Trinity Gardens

== Council ==
The council consists of 14 elected members comprising a mayor, and 13 ward councillors. The council area is divided into six wards.

Elected council members for the City of Norwood, Payneham & St Peters (Note: Council members are current as of September 2026)
Ward	Party Affiliation	Councillor	First elected	Notes
Mayor	Independent	Robert Bria	1997	Mayor from 2005
Kensington / East Norwood Ward	Independent	John Callisto		
Kensington / East Norwood Ward	Independent	Christel Mex		
Maylands/ Trinity Ward	Independent	Connie Granozio		
Maylands/ Trinity Ward	Liberal	Victoria McFarlane		
Maylands/ Trinity Ward	Independent	Scott Sims		
Payneham Ward	Independent	Kevin Duke		
Payneham Ward	Independent	Josh Robinson		
St Peters Ward	Independent	Rita Excell		
St Peters Ward	Independent	Kester Moorhouse		
Torrens Ward	Independent	Hugh Holfeld		
Torrens Ward	Independent	Garry Knoblauch		
West Norwood/ Kent Town	Independent	Sandy Wilkinson		
West Norwood/ Kent Town	Independent	Grant Piggot		

== See also ==
- Local government areas of South Australia
