= St Peters, South Australia =

St Peters
- Suburb
- Interactive map of St Peters
- Coordinates: 34°54′11″S 138°37′19″E
- Country: Australia
- State: South Australia
- City: Adelaide
- LGA: City of Norwood Payneham St Peters
- Location: 3 km (1.9 mi) from Adelaide
- Established: 1838

Government
  - State electorate: Dunstan
  - Federal division: Sturt

Population
  - Total: 3,231 (SAL 2021)
- Postcode: 5069
Suburbs around St Peters
Walkerville	Joslin	Joslin
Gilberton	St Peters	Evandale
College Park	Stepney	Evandale

St Peters is an inner-eastern suburb of Adelaide, South Australia in the City of Norwood Payneham St Peters.

The area was first settled in 1838, with allotments sold to investors in the South Australia Company. It was originally a separate town and was named after the Church of England's school of St Peter. The nearby school, now commonly known as St Peter's College, was relocated to its current site in 1854 on 75 acres (30 ha) of land in what is now known as Hackney.

St Peters Post Office opened on 1 November 1886.

It was formerly the seat of its own municipality, the Corporate Town of St Peters, but since 1997 has been part of the City of Norwood Payneham & St Peters. The historic St Peters Town Hall and attached 1911 banquet hall are listed on the South Australian Heritage Register.

The East Adelaide Primitive Methodist Church was established in 1883. It became East Adelaide Methodist church in 1901, and Spicer Memorial Church in 1906 following the death of its benefactor, pastoralist Sir Edward Spicer. It is now known as Spicer Uniting Church at St Peters. The cottages across the road were funded by the Spicer Cottages Trust to provide low rent accommodation for retired Methodist ministers.
