= Maylands, South Australia =

Maylands
- Suburb
- Interactive map of Maylands
- Country: Australia
- State: South Australia
- City: Adelaide
- LGA: City of Norwood Payneham St Peters
- Location: 4 km (2.5 mi) from Adelaide
- Established: 1876

Government
  - State electorate: Dunstan
  - Federal division: Sturt

Area
  - Total: 0.5 km^{2} (0.19 sq mi)

Population
  - Total: 1,508 (SAL 2021)
- Postcode: 5069
Suburbs around Maylands
Evandale	Evandale	Payneham South
Stepney	Maylands	Trinity Gardens
Norwood	Norwood	Beulah Park

Maylands is a suburb of Adelaide located within the City of Norwood Payneham St Peters, and bound by the main roads Portrush Road and Magill Road.

== History ==
Maylands was named by William Wadham (who married Jane Cooper circa 1852 in Adelaide) and Luke M Cullen, early settlers who sold the land that made up the original town in 1876. There is a Mayland in the English county of Essex from whence the Cooper family emigrated.

Maylands consists of mostly medium density residential properties, predominantly in an east–west elevation with most streets in the suburb oriented north–south. Many of its houses having been built in the late 19th century and early 20th century, there are South Australian examples of colonial, Federation and some art deco architecture. Unlike Stepney, to Maylands' west, the dwellings are usually larger with some remaining homes attached to small market gardens. There are few "workers cottages", but most are found in the north-western section of the suburb.

Some heritage preservation has occurred in the suburb. The then Metropolitan Tramways Trust (or MTT) was converted into a set of unit accommodation by the South Australian Housing Trust. The suburb is also known for the antique stores along Magill Road.

== Landmarks ==
One of the most notable landmarks includes the Maylands Hotel, which is located opposite Cruickshank Reserve on the south eastern corner of the Phillis and Clifton Streets intersection. The hotel remains whereas the Tip-Top Bakery site on the south-western corner of the same intersection was demolished and replaced by townhouses.

The Maylands Hotel has become a popular eatery, with it arguably being off the beaten track and hidden in leafy suburbia. Up until the 1990s, the hotel had a beer garden. With the introduction of poker machines into South Australia, this beer garden was replaced by an extended dining area and poker machine area.

== Politics ==
Maylands is represented in the Dunstan electorate in the Parliament of South Australia, and within the Division of Sturt in the Australian House of Representatives.
