= Hackney, South Australia =

Hackney
- Suburb
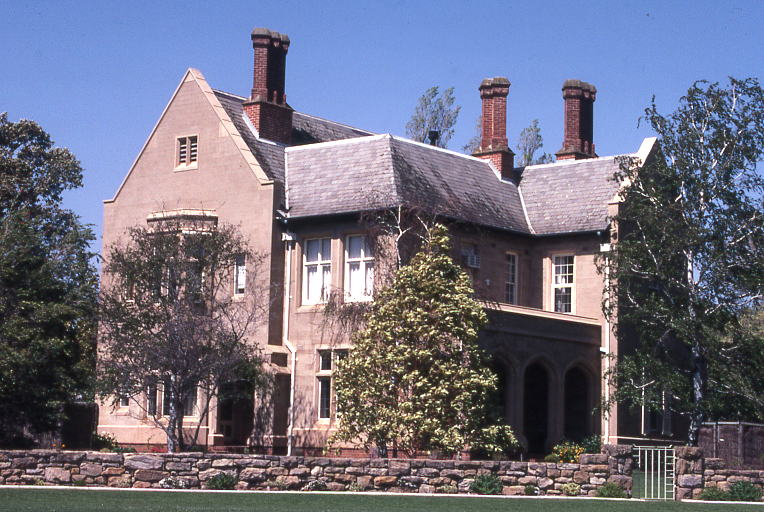
- Headmaster's house, St Peter's College

- Interactive map of Hackney
- Country: Australia
- State: South Australia
- City: Adelaide
- LGA: City of Norwood Payneham St Peters

Government
  - State electorate: Dunstan
  - Federal division: Sturt

Area
  - Total: 0.5 km^{2} (0.19 sq mi)

Population
  - Total: 575 (SAL 2021)
- Postcode: 5069
Suburbs around Hackney
North Adelaide	Gilberton	St Peters
Adelaide Park Lands	Hackney	College Park
Adelaide city centre	Kent Town	Norwood

Hackney is an inner-eastern suburb of Adelaide, South Australia, in the City of Norwood Payneham St Peters. It is adjacent to the Adelaide Park Lands, the Adelaide city centre and North Adelaide. The O-Bahn Busway passes along Hackney Road, part of the City Ring Route, which forms its western boundary. Its other boundaries are the River Torrens (north), the continuation of North Terrace through Kent Town (south), and a series of small streets and lanes to the east.

The suburb is dominated by St Peter's College, an independent boys' school, which is wholly located within the suburb and occupies a 75-acre (30 ha) site, about 60% of the suburb's area. Located at this site since 1854, the school grounds contain three heritage-listed buildings.

Romilly House in the southwest corner of the suburb, on North Terrace, is also listed on the Heritage Register.

Hackney is adjacent to Park 11 of the Park Lands, across Hackney Road from the Botanic Gardens, the Botanic Park and the National Wine Centre.

== O-Bahn Busway works ==
Prior to the 2018 election, the state Labor government decided to build in 2016–2017 a $160 million tunnel for the O-Bahn Busway from north of North Terrace, Hackney, through the Adelaide Park Lands to the corner of Grenfell Street and East Terrace on the eastern edge of the Adelaide city centre. As part of this work, the middle of the entire length of Hackney Road, Hackney, from the River Torrens to North Terrace was rebuilt to provide buslanes and an entrance to / exit from the tunnel. The cost/benefit ratio of this project was questioned, traffic disruption was considerable, and the Labor party did not win the 2018 election.
