= Evandale, South Australia =

Evandale Adelaide, South Australia
- Coordinates: 34.905°S 138.635°E
- Population: 1,378 (SAL 2021)
- Postcode(s): 5069
- Area: 0.4 km^{2} (0.2 sq mi)
- LGA(s): City of Norwood Payneham St Peters
- State electorate(s): Dunstan
- Federal division(s): Sturt
Suburbs around Evandale:
Joslin	Royston Park	Payneham
St Peters	Evandale	Payneham South
Stepney	Maylands	Trinity Gardens

Evandale is a small suburb of Adelaide in the City of Norwood Payneham St Peters. It is bounded on the northwest by Payneham Road and on the east by Portrush Road, with smaller streets bounding the north and south.
