= Joslin, South Australia =

Joslin
- Suburb
- Interactive map of Joslin
- Coordinates: 34°53′56″S 138°37′30″E
- Country: Australia
- State: South Australia
- City: Adelaide
- LGA: City of Norwood Payneham St Peters

Government
  - State electorate: Dunstan
  - Federal division: Sturt

Area
  - Total: 0.5 km^{2} (0.19 sq mi)

Population
  - Total: 1,243 (SAL 2021)
- Postcode: 5070
Suburbs around Joslin
Walkerville		Royston Park
	Joslin	Payneham
St Peters		Evandale

Joslin is a suburb of Adelaide in the City of Norwood Payneham St Peters. It is rectangular, stretching from Payneham Road (southeast) to the River Torrens and Torrens Linear Park (northwest), but from Lambert Road on the northeast only about 350m along the numbered avenues towards the next cross street which is in St Peters.

The O-Bahn Busway crosses the western corner of the suburb, but there is not a station nearby.
