= Electoral district of Hartley =

South Australian state electoral district

Hartley South Australia—House of Assembly
- Interactive map of electoral district boundaries from the 2022 state election (Note: The electorate will have no change in boundaries at the 2026 state election.)
- State: South Australia
- Created: 1977
- MP: Jenn Roberts
- Party: Labor
- Namesake: John Anderson Hartley
- Electors: 26,791 (2026)
- Area: 16.1 km^{2} (6.2 sq mi)
- Demographic: Metropolitan
- Coordinates: 34°53′43″S 138°39′56″E
Electorates around Hartley:
Torrens	Torrens	Morialta
Dunstan	Hartley	Morialta
Bragg	Bragg	Bragg

Hartley is a single-member electoral district for the South Australian House of Assembly. It is named after John Anderson Hartley, the public servant responsible for creating much of South Australia's public education system. It is a suburban electorate in Adelaide's inner northeast, taking in the suburbs of Campbelltown, Dernacourt, Flexistow, Glynde, Hectorville, Magill, Paradise and Tranmere.

== History ==
Hartley was created at the electoral redistribution of 1976 as a marginal Labor seat, and was first contested at the 1977 state election by then Deputy Premier Des Corcoran, who had moved from the more marginal seat of Coles after a redistribution erased Labor's majority there. He was succeeded by Terry Groom. The 1991 redistribution erased Groom's majority and made the seat marginally Liberal. Believing this made Hartley unwinnable, Groom tried to gain preselection for a safer seat, only to be turned down. He resigned from the Labor Party and served out the rest of his term as an independent. The seat subsequently fell to Groom's 1989 challenger, Joe Scalzi at the 1993 election amid that year's massive Liberal landslide. Scalzi was nearly defeated at the 1997 election, in which his margin was reduced to a paper-thin 0.7 percent, making Hartley the Liberals' most marginal seat—a status that remained unchanged in 2002 as Labor won government. Scalzi was swept away amidst the landslide Labor victory at the 2006 election, conceding defeat to Labor's Grace Portolesi, and failed to regain the seat at the 2010 election. A redistribution saw Labor's majority reduced from an already-marginal 2.3 percent to a paper-thin 0.1 percent. Liberal Vincent Tarzia defeated Labor's Portolesi in the 2014 election.

== Members for Hartley ==
Member	Party	Term
Des Corcoran	Labor	1977–1982
Terry Groom	Labor	1982–1991
Terry Groom	Independent	1991–1993
Joe Scalzi	Liberal	1993–2006
Grace Portolesi	Labor	2006–2014
Vincent Tarzia	Liberal	2014–2026
Jenn Roberts	Labor	2026–present

== Election results ==
2026 South Australian state election: Hartley
Party	Candidate	Votes	%	±%
Labor	Jenn Roberts	8,374	36.8	−0.6
Liberal	Vincent Tarzia	6,747	29.6	−21.4
One Nation	David Dwyer	3,644	16.0	+16.0
Greens	Melanie Searle	2,882	12.7	+1.1
Family First	Hugh Thompson	468	2.1	+2.1
Real Change	Mara Dottore	344	1.5	+1.5
United Voice	Peter Salerno	126	0.6	+0.6
Australian Family	Bruce Smith	101	0.4	+0.4
Fair Go	Robert Mill	76	0.3	+0.3
Total formal votes		22,762	94.9	−2.0
Informal votes		1,234	5.1	+2.0
Turnout		23,996	89.6	±0.0
Two-party-preferred result
Labor	Jenn Roberts	12,455	54.7	+8.3
Liberal	Vincent Tarzia	10,313	45.3	−8.3
Labor gain from Liberal		Swing	+8.3	
