= Carl Laubman =

Australian optician, inventor (1878–1958)

Carl Wilhelm Laubman (11 May 1878 – 8 July 1958) was an Australian optician, inventor, and co-founder of Laubman & Pank.

== Early life ==
Laubmann was born in Stepney, an inner suburb of Adelaide, South Australia. He was the eldest of seven children of John Laubmann, carpenter and joiner, and Sophie Caroline (née Matte), both of German origin. His only brother having died in infancy, he was raised with five younger sisters. Educated at Norwood Primary School, his family were in humble circumstances, so the teenager was early obliged to make his own way in the world.

Leaving school in 1892 aged 14, he was then employed and trained as an optician by Adelaide ophthalmologist Dr T K Hamilton. A patient perfectionist, he used woodworking skills learnt from his father to make his own optical cabinets and metal tools. In 1900, when he was 21, the family's situation worsened with the death of his father. That same year, having noted that optician services were in demand in rural and regional areas, he set up business in the mining town of Broken Hill. He also travelled to remote outback places, such as White Cliffs and Wilcannia, offering his services.

He married in Broken Hill in 1905 to local girl, Maude May Sullivan (1887–1948), whose parents were of Irish ancestry. Her grandfather, a miner, had sight impairment from a mining accident. Her father was a thriving transport contractor in Broken Hill, employing many men. Maude had outstanding musical talents. An accomplished pianist, she was also a popular contralto soloist locally.

== Career ==
In 1907 a 25-year-old Adelaide optometrist, Harold George Pank (1882–1935), paid Laubmann a courtesy call while visiting Broken Hill as a musician. Pank's parents were of English origin.

A firm friendship quickly formed, particularly as Harold Pank and Maude Laubmann shared a common interest in music, he being a talented cellist.

The Laubmann's were preparing to build their own home in Broken Hill when the year 1908 brought significant changes. A daughter, named Eulalie, was born to the young couple. Maude's father decided to sell up his transport business and retire to Adelaide. Carl's mother Sophie died in Adelaide, aged just 49. Harold Pank then wrote from Adelaide, again suggesting a partnership, and this time it was accepted. The Laubmann family moved to Adelaide.

Laubmann & Pank, as they styled themselves, commenced business as opticians in 1908 in Victoria Square, Adelaide. The new partners quickly realised they needed greater customer exposure, so in 1909 they moved to the city's busiest commercial street, Rundle Street. Business then began to flourish. Harold Pank married in 1910 to Johanna Hower (1878–1930), a trained nurse from Victoria, who also became active in the business in its early years. Maude Laubman began music studies at the Elder Conservatorium.

In 1913 Carl was a foundation member of the South Australian Optical Association, being immediately elected to its council, a position he held for many years. Upon the outbreak of World War I in 1914, Maude Laubman's only brother, Christopher Sullivan (1886–1944), enlisted in the 10th Battalion. Due to anti-German attitudes by the public, Carl anglicised his name to Charles William Laubman, although he remained Carl to family and associates. Having dropped the last letter from his surname, the business now became Laubman & Pank. Diversifying from just being opticians, they also traded in all manner of optical instruments. Their field glasses were popular as parting gifts to military officers.

Always experimenting, the men invented and developed several important optical instruments, lenses, and processes, for which patents were granted both in Australia and overseas. In 1927 the now prosperous partners undertook a world trip, visiting many of the famous optical manufacturers throughout Britain, Europe and the United States. In Germany they visited scientist Albert Einstein, personally delivering a report of observations from the South Australian Government Astronomer concerning the theory of relativity.

In 1926 Carl employed his 14-year-old nephew by his sister Charlotte, Donald Herbert Schultz (1912–1987), as an apprentice. In 1930 Johanna Pank died. By that year, with staff totalling over fifty, Laubman & Pank had become pioneers in itinerant optometry, visiting rural and regional areas of South Australia, far western NSW, and western Victoria. In pursuit of their creed of customer service, no place was too remote for their opticians to visit. In 1933 they purchased their own four-storey commercial premises in Gawler Place, Adelaide. In 1934 Harold Pank's 17-year-old son, David Leon Pank AM AFC (1917–2004), joined the business.

By the 1920s and 30s Mr and Mrs Laubman were active participants in Adelaide's social and arts scene, sponsoring, among other things, the Laubman and Pank Gallery. Harold Pank died in 1935, the same year that a branch office was opened in Broken Hill. Carl Laubman then became sole proprietor until a company was formed in 1937, of which he became governing director. Shortly before World War II the company diversified further, into hearing aids and photography, while more branch offices were added.

After Maude Laubman died in 1947, daughter Eulalie Laubman (1908–1989), kept house for Carl in the family home at Henley Beach in suburban Adelaide. That same year, Carl relinquished control of the business to his protégées, Don Schultz and David Pank, who bought a controlling interest in Laubman & Pank. These two men then became co-governing directors of Laubman & Pank for many years, compelling it to far greater heights.

== Retirement and death ==
Carl Laubman retired in 1956 and died at Henley Beach on 8 July 1958, aged 80. He was interred at Summertown Cemetery, among relatives of his mother and sisters. His heir, daughter Eulalie, who never married, became a generous and major charity benefactor, often anonymously. She quietly donated many millions, particularly to charities associated with vision, heart, and cancer research.

== Select bibliography ==
- Beck, Peter (ed); The Business Who's Who of Australia (31st Edition), (Sydney, 1997) ISBN 1-875430-51-2
- Slee, Max; Bennett Family History: incorporating the Anderson, Milnes, Robbins, Davies, Barry and Sullivan families (Adelaide 1995). ISBN 0-9597436-1-8
- Statton, Jill (ed); Biographical Index of South Australians. (Adelaide 1986). ISBN 0-9594815-3-2
- Towler, David James; Men of vision : a history of Laubman and Pank, 1908–1988 (Adelaide, 1988).
