= Grace Portolesi =

Australian politician

The Honourable Grace Portolesi

Minister for Education and Child Development
- In office 21 October 2011 – 21 January 2013
- Preceded by: Jay Weatherill
- Succeeded by: Jennifer Rankine

Member of the South Australian House of Assembly for Hartley
- In office 30 March 2006 – 14 March 2014
- Preceded by: Joe Scalzi
- Succeeded by: Vincent Tarzia

Personal details
- Born: 26 June 1968 (age 58) Adelaide, South Australia, Australia
- Party: Australian Labor Party (SA)

Grace Portolesi (Italian: [portoˈleːzi]; born 26 June 1968) is an Australian politician who represented the South Australian House of Assembly seat of Hartley from 2006 to 2014 for the Labor Party.

Previously the parliamentary secretary assisting the Attorney-General, in 2010 Portolesi was appointed Minister for Aboriginal Affairs and Reconciliation, Multicultural Affairs, Youth and Volunteers. Portolesi was appointed Minister for Education and Child Development in 2011, a position she held until 2013. From 2013 to 2014 she was the Minister for Employment, Higher Education and Skills, Minister for Science and Information Economy, and a Member of the Executive Council. She is aligned with Labor's left faction.

== Early life ==
Portolesi was born in Adelaide to a migrant Italian family. She studied public policy and government at Flinders University where she became involved in student politics, serving as president of the Flinders University Student Association. After leaving university without graduating, she worked as an equal opportunities officer at the University of South Australia.

== Political career ==
In the early 1990s, she moved to Queensland to take up a position as an advisor to then Premier of Queensland, Wayne Goss. She returned to Adelaide some years later to work as a policy advisor to then Opposition Leader, Mike Rann. When Labor won government in 2002, she took up the position of chief of staff for the Minister for Families and Community Services, Jay Weatherill, a position she held until her election to parliament in 2006.

=== 2006 election ===
Portolesi decided to enter politics prior to the 2006 state election, and was nominated, unopposed, for preselection to the then highly marginal Liberal seat of Hartley. The traditionally Labor seat had been won by Joe Scalzi at the Liberal landslide of 1993, and as a popular local member, Scalzi went against the predictions to retain the seat in 1997 and 2002. Portolesi's status as an Italian-Australian broadened her support in the ethnically diverse community, and helped neutralise a factor that Scalzi had used to his advantage in the past.

Although Labor was widely expected to win several seats at the election, Hartley was expected to be a particularly close race, due to Scalzi's incumbency, personal support, and record of bucking wider electoral trends. The campaign in the seat was heavily presidential, with Premier Mike Rann strongly supporting Portolesi and doorknocking homes for her several times. Some local issues were raised, however, mostly in the form of policing and the fate of Lochiel Park, which had been threatened with development. Early polls placed Scalzi as the favourite, but Portolesi slowly narrowed the gap, and was leading the polls by January 2006. She seemed to suffer a major setback when polls in the week before the election returned to predicting a win for Scalzi. However, Portolesi achieved a 5.9 percent two-party swing to finish with a 4.6 percent margin.

The result was closer than in other similarly marginal seats, with Scalzi initially refusing to concede defeat, but the result had become clear by the end of the night, and he did so the following day. Three days later, it was announced that Portolesi would be appointed as a parliamentary secretary (assisting the Attorney-General) in the new government, the only one of the party's new recruits to gain such a position.

=== 2010 election ===
At the 2010 state election, Portolesi held Hartley with a margin of 2.3 percent.

Portolesi was part of a successful campaign to reverse the closure of the Italian Consulate at Glynde which had been earmarked for closure by the Italian government.

=== 2014 election ===
At the 2014 election, Hartley had undergone a significant redistribution, with Portolesi's margin reduced to 0.1 percent. She lost the seat to Liberal candidate Vincent Tarzia from a 2.6 percent two-party swing.

== Political persuasion ==
Portolesi has been a vocal supporter of paid maternity leave, and established a select committee on work–life balance in her first year as the Member for Hartley. She dedicated her election in 2006 to 'working mums', and spoke in her maiden speech of the 'struggle to juggle' – the work–life balance.

In 2008 she introduced a private member's bill to protect patients' medical records after she was made aware that a landlord in her electorate was withholding 10,000 confidential records as part of a tenancy dispute. The legislation passed both Houses of the South Australian parliament.

Portolesi is in the left wing of the Labor Party. She has shown support for same-sex unions and is a member of the pro-choice organisation for Australian women parliamentarians, Emily's List. She is an opponent of the Family First Party, and expressed relief at the conclusion of the 2006 campaign that she had been able to win the seat without their preferences.

Portolesi is a registered lobbyist in South Australia, listed as Grace Portolesi Connect.

== Personal life ==
She is married to Advertiser journalist Miles Kemp and has a daughter, Allegra Kemp.

South Australian House of Assembly
Preceded by Joe Scalzi	Member for Hartley; 2006–2014	Succeeded by Vincent Tarzia
