= Terry Groom =

Australian politician (1944–2021)

The Honourable Terry Groom MP

Member of the South Australian House of Assembly for Morphett
- Preceded by: New seat
- Succeeded by: John Oswald

Member of the South Australian House of Assembly for Hartley
- Preceded by: Des Corcoran
- Succeeded by: Joe Scalzi

Personal details
- Born: 28 November 1944
- Died: 29 April 2021 (aged 76)
- Party: Labor (1982-1991, 2000 onwards)
- Other political affiliations: Independent (1991-2000)

Terence Robert Groom (28 November 1944 – 29 April 2021) was an Australian politician who represented the South Australian House of Assembly seats of Morphett from 1977 to 1979 and Hartley from 1982 to 1993 for the Labor Party. He served from 1991 to 1993 as an independent. Groom died on 29 April 2021.

South Australian House of Assembly
New seat	Member for Morphett; 1977–1979	Succeeded by John Oswald
Preceded by Des Corcoran	Member for Hartley; 1982–1993	Succeeded by Joe Scalzi
