= George Hunt (merchant) =

Australian merchant (1845–1911)

George Hunt (ca.1845 – 13 May 1911) was a wealthy merchant in South Australia, remembered as the founder of "Tranmere House".

== History ==
George was born in Ashton, Northamptonshire, and emigrated to South Australia with his parents on the Ascendant in 1849. In 1858 his father, George Hunt Snr. (1806 – 22 August 1874), took up land (section 1197, Hundred of Onkaparinga) 3 km south-east of Norton Summit, which he subdivided to become the town of Ashton.

Around 1866 George started working in the drapery business in Adelaide, and around 1870 started his own shop, later entering into partnership with Samuel Corry (ca.1808 – 27 October 1896) as Hunt, Corry, & Co., with four large shops on Rundle Street opposite the Adelaide Arcade. George carried on business for two years after Corry's death, then retired. His business encompassed branches in Northam, Albany, Esperance Bay, and Perth.

George Hunt purchased a substantial block of land on Magill Road, previously owned by George Morphett, where in 1898 he built the mansion "Tranmere House", surrounded by a magnificent garden. He was for many years a prominent member of the Pirie Street Methodist church.

Hunt was twice married; first to Elizabeth Guthrie (1846–1875): their children included Mrs. A. Scrymgour and Mrs. E. Cocking. His second wife was Eliza Ann Brusey (1854–1912); their family included Mrs. F. Wilson, Mrs. A. Campion, Miss Hunt, and Claude Hunt (1806–1874), who inherited and lived in Tranmere House.
