= Vincent Tarzia =

Australian politician (born 1986)

The Honourable Vincent Tarzia
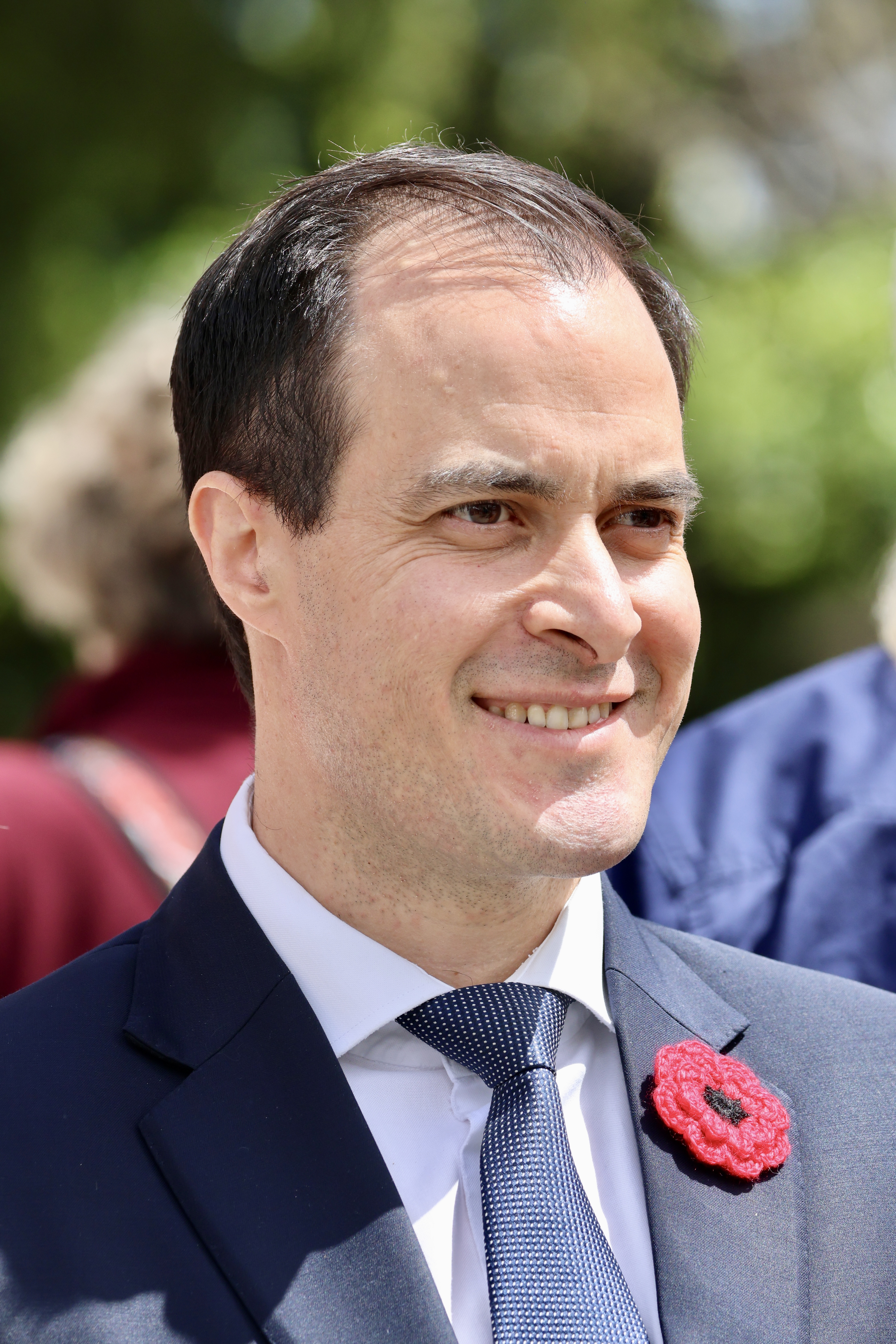
- Tarzia in 2025

Leader of the Opposition in South Australia
- In office 12 August 2024 – 5 December 2025
- Premier: Peter Malinauskas
- Deputy: John Gardner; Josh Teague
- Preceded by: David Speirs
- Succeeded by: Ashton Hurn

Leader of the South Australian Liberal Party
- In office 12 August 2024 – 5 December 2025
- Deputy: John Gardner; Josh Teague
- Preceded by: David Speirs
- Succeeded by: Ashton Hurn

35th Speaker of the South Australian House of Assembly
- In office 3 May 2018 – 29 July 2020
- Premier: Steven Marshall
- Deputy: Peter Treloar
- Preceded by: Michael Atkinson
- Succeeded by: Josh Teague

Member of the South Australian House of Assembly for Hartley
- In office 15 March 2014 – 21 March 2026
- Preceded by: Grace Portolesi
- Succeeded by: Jenn Roberts

Personal details
- Born: Vincent Anthony Tarzia; 24 September 1986 (age 40) Adelaide, South Australia, Australia
- Party: Liberal
- Spouse: Charissa Duffy (m. 2018)
- Children: 2
- Education: Rostrevor College; University of Adelaide (BCom; LLB)
- Occupation: Lawyer; politician

Vincent Anthony Tarzia (born 24 September 1986) is an Australian former politician and lawyer who served as Leader of the Opposition in South Australia and leader of the South Australian Liberal Party from 2024 to 2025. He represented Hartley in the South Australian House of Assembly from 2014 to 2026. In 2018, he became the youngest person to serve as Speaker of the House of Assembly.

Tarzia was educated at Rostrevor College and went on to study commerce and law at the University of Adelaide. His career involved working as a corporate lawyer and he was elected to the City of Norwood Payneham & St Peters council in 2010.

In the 2014 state election, Tarzia claimed Hartley for the Liberals from Labor incumbent Grace Portolesi. He retained the seat from Nick Xenophon in the 2018 election, when he was elected Speaker in May 2018. In 2020, Tarzia became Minister for Police, Emergency Services and Correctional Services for two years in the government of Steven Marshall. Tarzia then took up several shadow portfolios under the leadership of the Liberals' David Speirs.

Tarzia replaced Speirs as Liberal leader in August 2024, beating Josh Teague in a party-room vote. He resigned as party leader in December 2025, handing over to Ashton Hurn. At the 2026 state election, he lost his seat of Hartley to Labor's Jenn Roberts.

== Early life, education and legal career ==
Vincent Anthony Tarzia was born on 24 September 1986, son of Tony and Mary Tarzia. He comes from an Italian background. The grandparents on the mother's side came from Avellino while those on the father's side came from Calabria and migrated to Adelaide in the 1950s. Tarzia has discussed the challenges they faced because they could not speak English.

Tarzia studied at St Joseph's School in Payneham before enrolling at Rostrevor College, where he was the school captain and top academic student. He showed early interest in politics and debating and began helping with the election campaigns of Christopher Pyne when he was only 16 years old. As a teen, he was employed to stack shelves in a supermarket. While at Rostrevor, Tarzia was a member of the debating team and was on the first XVIII of the Australian rules football team in 2004.

Tarzia had considered taking up medicine but did not do well enough in the Undergraduate Medicine and Health Sciences Admission Test. He has since obtained a Bachelor of Commerce in corporate finance, a Bachelor of Laws, and a Graduate Diploma in Legal Practice from the University of Adelaide.

Prior to pursuing his legal career, Tarzia had entertained the idea of becoming a merchant banker after the global financial crisis of 2008. He received legal mentoring from lawyer Adrian Tembel and later became a corporate lawyer at Peregrine Corporation and Yasser Shahin.

== Early political career ==
=== Local government and election to parliament (2010–2018) ===
Tarzia joined the Liberal Party due to his values being aligned with those of the party. At the behest of Steven Marshall, he ran for office at local government level before contesting for election into state parliament. In 2010, he won the ward and got elected to the City of Norwood Payneham & St Peters council.

In the 2014 state election campaign period, the Electoral Commission upheld a complaint against three of Tarzia's campaign posters and ordered him to take them down. At the 15 March election, he won the seat of Hartley from Labor incumbent Grace Portolesi by 0.1 percentage points. His first speech indicated that he was an outsider in politics and wanted to make improvements to his community and to South Australia. He introduced freedom of information amendment bills in 2014 and 2015. In January 2016, he was appointed parliamentary secretary for entrepreneurship, innovation and business start-ups, while in January 2017 he became Shadow Cabinet Parliamentary Secretary.

Nick Xenophon said in October 2017 that he would vacate his seat in the Senate to run for Hartley at the 2018 state election. Portolesi was another candidate for her previous seat. Tarzia won the electorate with 58.6% of the two-party-preferred votes, defeating Xenophon. The Liberals were back in power after 16 years in opposition, with Marshall calling Tarzia "the Lion of Hartley."

=== Speaker of the House of Assembly (2018–2020) ===
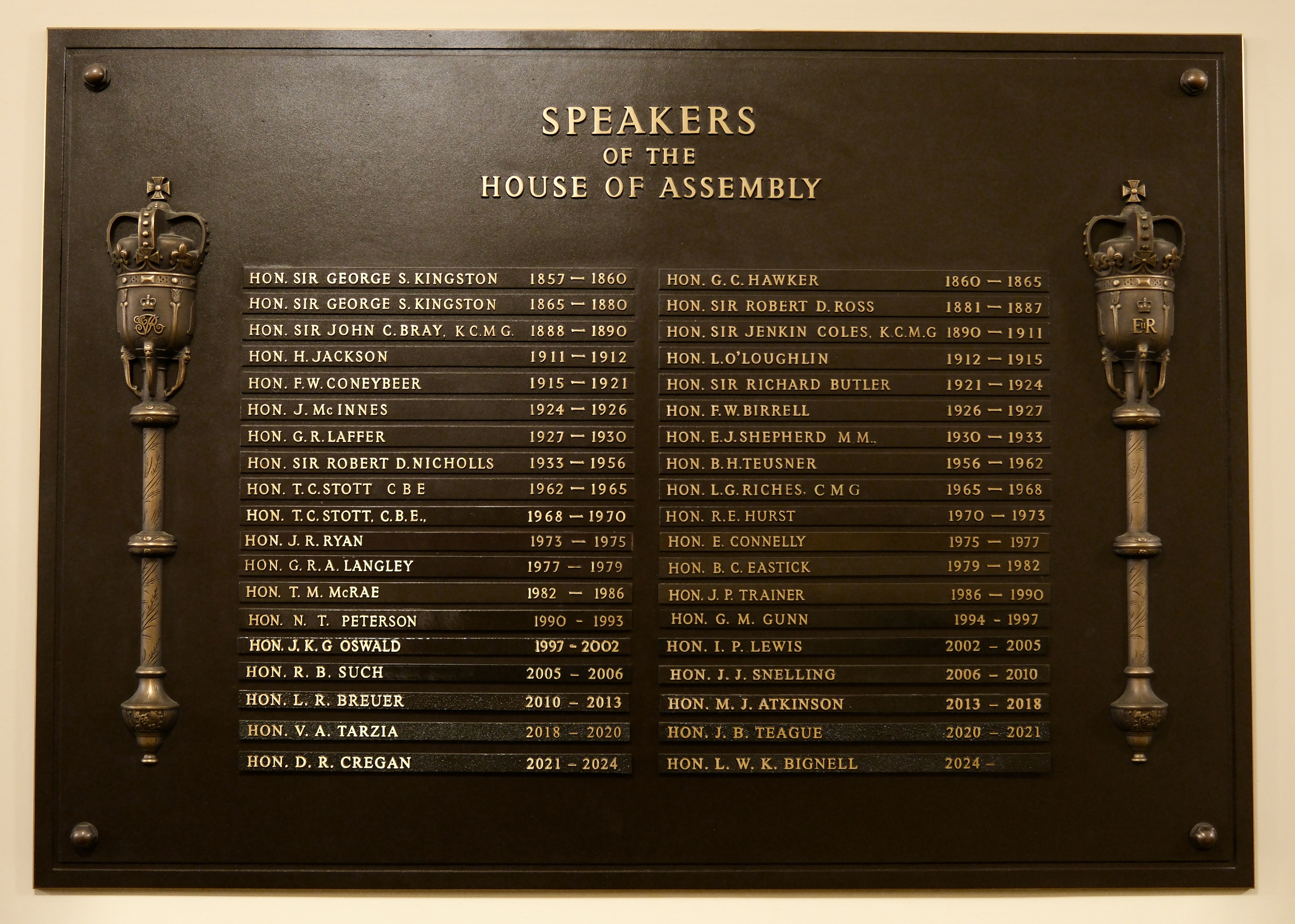
Tarzia's name inscribed on the Speakers of the House of Assembly plaque at Parliament House, Adelaide, in May 2026

With Marshall's endorsement, Tarzia was elected Speaker of the South Australian House of Assembly on 3 May 2018, which is the first day of the parliamentary session. At 31 years of age, he was the youngest speaker of the South Australian Parliament ever. Also, Tarzia described himself as the first Speaker of non-Anglo-Saxon descent. Towards the end of 2018, he became the first Speaker in Australia who allowed live-streaming the question time on Facebook.

During September 2019, Tarzia announced that he would vote in favour of the status quo should there be an equal number of votes in the House for proposed changes, including property tax and prostitution laws. In 2019, 24 MPs were expelled from the chamber 168 times, while only 20 MPs were expelled 85 times the previous year.

In January 2020, Tarzia initiated an investigation on claims against Liberal MP Sam Duluk for alleged misconduct. In February, Tarzia indicated that despite the validity of the claims, he had no jurisdiction as Speaker to impose any form of penalty and could only encourage parties to undergo reconciliation or mediation. He indicated that he would wait to see the outcome of the report and then determine whether or not he would publish it. In March, Labor criticised Tarzia on both his neutrality and on how he handled the investigation. The move to defer question time to discuss his approach was rejected by a tied vote 22–22.

In June, Tarzia and Terry Stephens advocated for releasing information on the payments made through the Country Members Accommodation Allowance scheme. In July, Tarzia resigned as Speaker during a cabinet re-organization.

=== Cabinet minister (2020–2021) ===
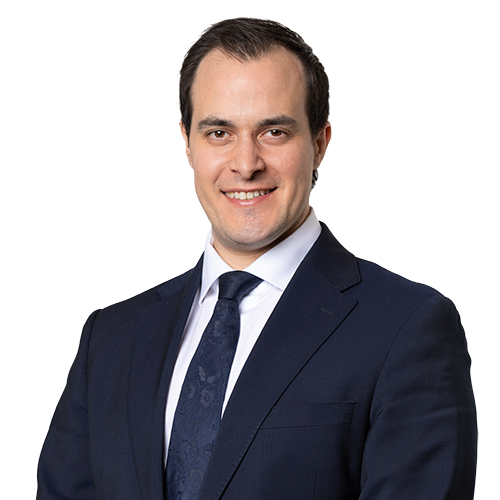
Official portrait, 2020

On 28 July 2020, Marshall nominated Tarzia to be the Minister for Police, Emergency Services and Correctional Services. He was sworn in as a minister of South Australia at Government House the next day, thus joining the ranks of the Executive Council. The new position saw Tarzia try to mend the relationship between the government and the hospitality industry, strained over COVID-19 regulations.

Tarzia supported the consultation process conducted by the government on the motorcycle safety legislation in 2020, whereas Labor MP Lee Odenwalder blamed him and Corey Wingard for inaction. In November, the government allocated A$800,000 to Crime Stoppers South Australia, their first funding from the state government.

Over $2 million in disaster risk reduction grants for South Australia was awarded in February 2021 by Tarzia and the federal minister David Littleproud. In March 3, he presented motorcycling licensing legislation that included increasing the minimum age required to obtain a learner's permit from 16 to 18. In July, he brought in stronger legislation concerning dangerous driving which increased the cost of towing a car and allowed confiscation and destruction of cars before completion of court procedures.

Tarzia came under scrutiny in August after the copies of a private letter written by Labor MP Jayne Stinson were shown or distributed among the officers by the police during traffic stops in Adelaide west area. He could not provide an explanation of how the letter found its way into the hands of officers and stated initially that he did not see any evidence of misconduct. In November, he introduced legislation for the immediate suspension of the driving licence when drivers failed roadside drug tests.

=== Speirs shadow ministry (2022–2024) ===
Hartley was retained by Tarzia in the 2022 state election by more than three percentage points. However, his ministerial term ended on 21 March 2024 because of the Liberals' loss of government. With the appointment of David Speirs as the new leader of the Liberals on 19 April, Tarzia received the shadow portfolios of infrastructure and transport, and sport, recreation and racing.

Tarzia expanded his portfolio on 29 January 2023 to include road safety. In the following month, he accused the Malinauskas government of not releasing the much-publicised Road Safety Action Plan. Some of the highlights of Tarzia's portfolio of transport during the Marshall administration included the negotiation of an agreement transferring control of Adelaide trams to Torrens Connect and Adelaide trains to Keolis Downer. On 19 April 2024, Tarzia surrendered his portfolio and became Shadow Minister for Business and Hospitality.

== Leader of the Opposition (2024–2025) ==
=== Leadership election and shadow cabinet reshuffle ===
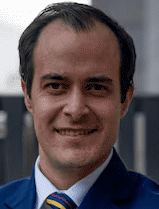
Official portrait, c. 2024

Tarzia was appointed as the new leader of the South Australian Liberal Party following the resignation of Speirs on 12 August 2024. He won the leadership position against Josh Teague with 18 votes against four in an internal party-room vote. While John Gardner did not contest for the leadership position, he supported Tarzia, alongside the other MPs, Tim Whetstone and Adrian Pederick. Tarzia refuted allegations of undermining Speirs and referred to him as a supporter of the party and a good friend.

Speirs declined his endorsement at first, claiming to have felt under siege by colleagues. He, however, had a constructive discussion with Tarzia and the issue was resolved. On 19 August, Tarzia restructured the shadow cabinet in preparation for the coming state election. Addressing the Liberal State Council as a new opposition leader for the first time on 26 August, he appealed for unity between the moderates and conservatives of the party in preparation for both state and federal elections.

On 3 September, Speirs said that he was informed via the media that he had been deselected from the front bench. Three days after, he stated that further division amongst the party members would result in a major defeat in the elections and hence the need for federal intervention within the state party. Tarzia dismissed the request and stated that he would meet Speirs.

=== Policy and election preparations ===
Tarzia stated in November 2024 that the party had paid too much focus to governing and too little to campaigning before their last state election loss. He said that the party needed to appeal to the centre politically and noted ambulance ramping, crime, cost of living, debt, housing, energy, and jobs as key issues. He supported the nuclear energy policy of Federal Liberal leader Peter Dutton. That month, debate about a proposal by Sarah Game on late term abortion highlighted internal party division. Tarzia said he would not work towards any changes to late term abortion legislation during his tenure.

Tarzia declared another shadow cabinet reshuffle on 21 January 2025 and took the business portfolio on the next day. Following poor performance of the party in the state during the federal election in May, Tarzia said the party needed to win back trust of the people and identified housing and preservation of agricultural land as key issues for the next state election in 2026.

The incentives included household battery incentives, stamp duty rebate for first-home buyers, payroll tax exemption for GPs, investment in Greater Adelaide heavy vehicle bypass and no-interest or low-interest loans for drought assistance. On 1 August, he assumed the workforce and population growth responsibility. In September, he criticised the inaccurate citations used by Frank Pangallo in parliament but refused to take any action against him regarding removing him from Budget and Finance Committee.

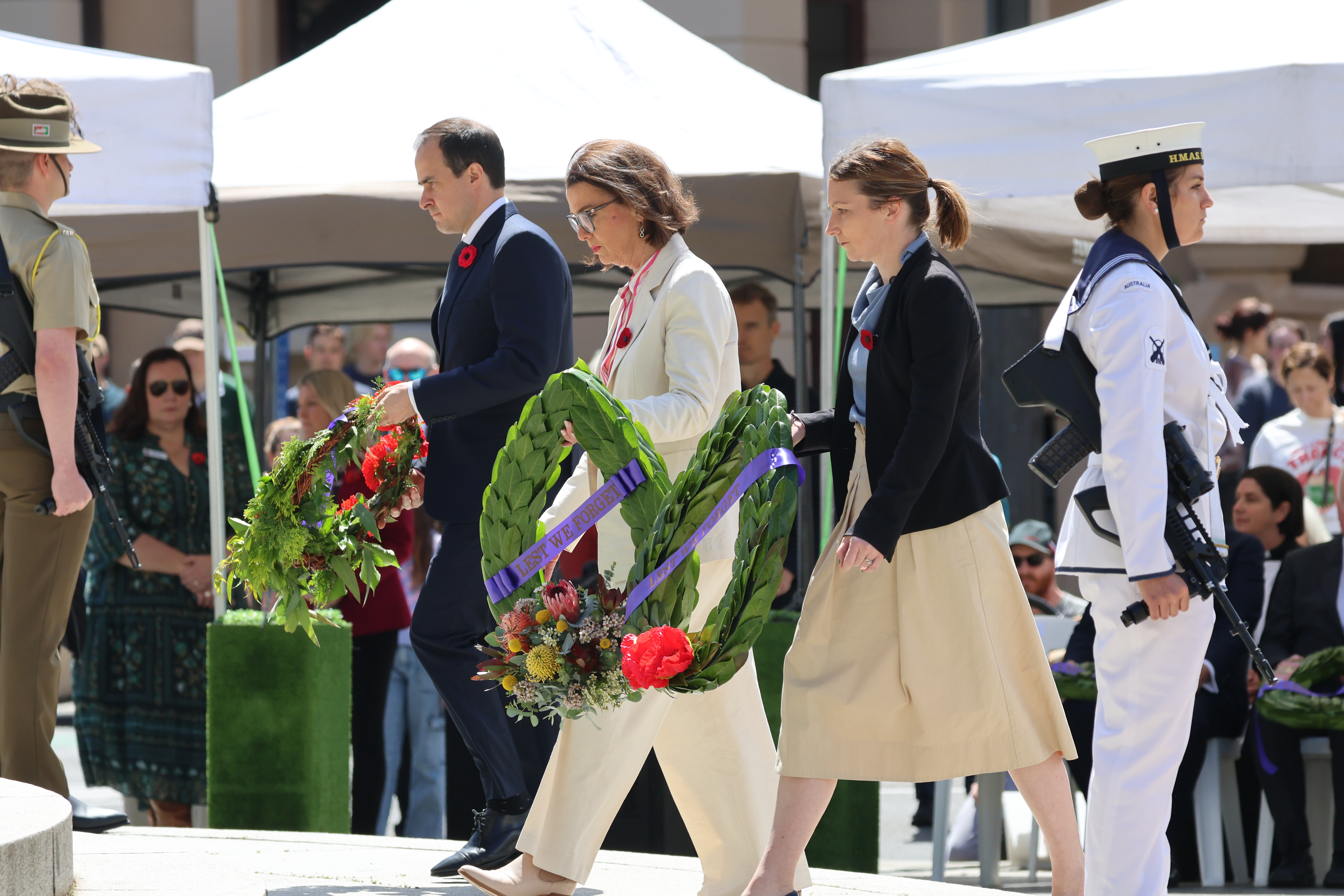
(L–R) Tarzia, Anne Ruston and Nicola Centofanti at a Remembrance Day wreath-laying ceremony at the National War Memorial, November 2025

On 5 November, Tarzia announced his housing tax proposal which includes elimination of stamp duty by 2041. He also listed some policies concerning restriction of government growth, managing migration and economic growth and net-zero emissions. On 1 December, he suggested forming an Office for Night Time Economy, which is estimated to cost $1.7 million annually, for streamlining the regulation of hospitality industry in Adelaide city.

=== Resignation and electoral defeat ===
Tarzia stepped down as the leader of the Liberal Party on 5 December 2025, almost three months prior to the state election. He explained that juggling the role of leadership along with his family and electorate duties had been challenging, and assured that he would contest Hartley again. His resignation followed media reports of unfavorable polling within the Liberal Party. (Note: Tarzia became the fourth Liberal leader across Australian states and territories to resign in recent months.) Ashton Hurn succeeded him on 8 December.

It was on 12 December 2025 that Tarzia relinquished his shadow portfolios and assumed the role of Shadow Minister for Sport, Recreation and Racing. In the 2026 state election, he lost Hartley to Labor candidate Jenn Roberts, who secured 54.7 per cent of the votes following an 8.3 per cent swing towards Labor.

== Personal life ==
Tarzia acquired Catholic morals from his early years. Both grandfathers in his family were from different political backgrounds; one grandfather was from the conservative party while the other from the trade unionist, which is centre-left. The two parents also took part in philanthropy. His mother, Mary, was discovered to have breast cancer while he was in Year 12 and thus collected in excess of $500,000 for cancer research.

Tarzia is from Magill and backs the Norwood Redlegs and Adelaide Crows football teams. In 2013, Tarzia belonged to the following organisations: Campbelltown Rotary Club, Payneham Returned and Services League and FaithHopeCharity Breast Cancer.

Tarzia met his wife Charissa through Young Liberals and LinkedIn, with their first date held at the Bath Hotel after an initial coffee meeting. They married in 2018, and Charissa is a law lecturer at Flinders University. Tarzia did not cohabit with his partner before marriage due to his traditional values. The couple have two sons, Leonardo and Raphael. Their pet dog, Howard, is named after former Prime Minister John Howard.

According to Tarzia, Scott Morrison's views on freedom, family and Christianity have influenced his political thinking. Additionally, he has also advocated for the use of Lord's Prayer during the commencement of parliamentary sessions.

== Honours and awards ==
Tarzia is a life member of the Altavilla Sports and Social Club. His entitlement to retain the title "The Honourable" was gazetted on 21 May 2023.

== Notes ==
South Australian House of Assembly
| Preceded by Grace Portolesi | Member for Hartley; 2014–2026 | Succeeded by Jenn Roberts |
| Preceded by Michael Atkinson | Speaker of the South Australian House of Assembly; 2018–2020 | Succeeded by Josh Teague |
Political offices
| Preceded by Corey Wingard | Minister for Police, Emergency Services and Correctional Services; 2020–2022 | Succeeded by Joe Szakacs |
| Preceded by David Speirs | Leader of the Opposition in South Australia; 2024–2025 | Succeeded by Ashton Hurn |
Party political offices
| Preceded by David Speirs | Leader of the South Australian Liberal Party; 2024–2025 | Succeeded by Ashton Hurn |
