= Beulah Park, South Australia =

Beulah Park
- Suburb
- Country: Australia
- State: South Australia
- City: Adelaide
- LGA: City of Burnside
- Location: 5 km (3.1 mi) from Adelaide
- Established: 1941

Government
  - State electorate: Dunstan
  - Federal division: Sturt

Area
  - Total: 0.6 km^{2} (0.23 sq mi)

Population
  - Total: 1,601 (SAL 2021)
- Postcode: 5067
Suburbs around Beulah Park
Maylands	Trinity Gardens	St Morris
Norwood	Beulah Park	Kensington Park
Norwood	Kensington	Kensington Park

Beulah Park is a suburb of Adelaide, South Australia in the City of Burnside.

The suburb was established in 1941 when the name Beulah Park was transferred to a collection of land allotments.

Clayton Wesley Uniting Church, on the north-east corner of Portrush Road and The Parade, with its tall spire, is visible from Norwood down most of the length of The Parade from the west. This building was opened in May 1883, although an earlier building (still behind the present church, now the Lecture Hall) was built in 1856.

Beulah Park Post Office opened around 1949 and closed in 1975.

The Norwood Swim School is actually in Beulah Park, on the northern side of the Parade.
