= George Morphett =

Anglo-Australian settler, businessman and politician (1811–1893)

Personal details
- Born: 21 May 1811; London, England
- Died: 20 October 1893 (aged 82)
- Relations: John Morphett
- Parent(s): Nathaniel Morphett and Mary Morphett (née Gliddon)

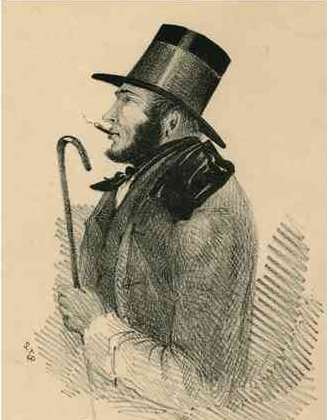
George Morphett - Cartoon by S.T. Gill, ca. 1849

George Morphett (21 May 1811 – 20 October 1893) was a settler in the colony of South Australia, and younger brother of John Morphett.

== History ==
Morphett was born in London to solicitor Nathaniel Morphett and his wife Mary, née Gliddon, of "Cummins", Ide, Devon.

He travelled to Egypt in 1833 to meet up with his brother John. Together they toured Egypt and Italy before returning to England. He married Ann Hitchcock in 1835.

When the Secondary Towns Association was formed in London in October 1838 for the purpose of establishing sites for secondary towns in the colony of South Australia, Morphett was appointed its Secretary. He emigrated to South Australia, arriving at Holdfast Bay on 12 December 1840 on the Brightman. In January–February 1841, accompanied by John Hill, he explored the arid plains due north of Morgan on behalf of the Association, searching for a reported fertile region, but found only hardship and disappointment. On 2 March 1841 Morphett was sworn in as a barrister and solicitor in the Supreme Court of South Australia. He lived at North Adelaide, set up a legal practice in the city and returned to England.

He returned to South Australia in 1846 on the barque Enmore with his wife and three children. A daughter was born during the voyage on 7 January 1846. James Philcox, land speculator, was on the same ship, also a return journey.

He was involved in a large number of profitable transactions in the land speculation frenzy that the orderly Adelaide real estate market had become. One was the sale to a consortium of Jewish businessmen, including Morris Lyon Marks, of a block on Rundle Street for their synagogue. One of his last transactions was the sale, to wealthy Rundle Street draper George Hunt, of a block on Magill Road which became the site for his mansion, "Tranmere House", built in 1898.

Morphett was named in an article in the Adelaide Times in December 1856, along with his friend James Philcox, John Grainger, Edmund Trimmer, and George Aston condemning certain land speculators for underhand practices, including conspiring to purchase government land at less than market prices. They were referred to as "land sharks" in the article.

Morphett was appointed a director of the South Australian Marine & Fire & Life Assurance Company, the Bank of South Australia and several mining companies.

In March 1860 he was elected to the district of West Torrens as a member of the South Australian House of Assembly. He was a conscientious and able member, a supporter of Robert Torrens's Real Property Act, but left the colony for London on the Orient on 31 October 1860 and never returned. His resignation from parliament was received in April 1861.

He was a Director of Underground Railways London and Metropolitan Railway Company.

He died in Kensington, London, in October 1893.

== Family ==
He married Ann Hitchcock. in 1835

=== Children ===
- Three children were born in England, including:
  - Fanny Australia Morphett (born 1838, Islington)
  - Nathaniel George Morphett (born 16 March 1840, Clerkenwell, died 23 September 1872), educated at Highgate School from 1849 to 1857
- A daughter (born on 7 January 1846 aboard the Enmore from England)
- Eustace Morphett (born 21 December 1847, North Adelaide)

== See also ==
- Morphett families of South Australia
