= Morphett families of South Australia =

South Australian Morphett families include the children of Nathaniel Morphett and Mary Morphett (née Gliddon):

- Sir John Morphett (4 May 1809 – 7 November 1892), pioneer, landowner and President of the South Australian Legislative Council. He married Lady Elizabeth Fisher; their children include Hurtle Morphett and John Cummins Morphett.
- George Morphett (21 May 1811 – 19 October 1893), prominent lawyer and Member of Parliament for West Torrens

Other Morphett families figure prominently in the early history of the towns Clarendon, Truro and Quorn, but their relationship to the two politicians is yet to be established.

- Jeremiah Morphett (born c. 1783) and Ann (née Colegate) (28 November 1795 – 22 April 1869) they emigrated to South Australia aboard Trusty, arrived 15 May 1838. She died at Angle Vale, South Australia; Jeremiah died at "Hornbrook", Woodchurch, Kent. Their children included Jeremiah and Richard, who were pioneers of Clarendon, and known as its founders in 1846. They have been identified as cousins of John and George Morphett.
  - Jeremiah Morphett (c. 1817 – 19 April 1893) emigrated to Australia on the Trusty with his wife Mary (née Dawes), arriving 15 May 1838. Died in Richmond, Victoria.
  - Richard Morphett (c. 1822 – 15 July 1902) arrived in South Australia on the Taglioni on 13 October 1842; he married Lucy Du Rieu (ca.1825 – 1 September 1871?) (ca.1837 – 2 March 1920?) on 9 August 1843; arrived Clarendon 1845; lived at "Blackwood Lodge", Clarendon Farm. 1852; involved in Baptist church 1861, had vineyard 1864, wines 1866. The first meeting of Clarendon town council was held in his home. Their large family included Albert Louis Morphett (19 January 1867 – 29 March 1931), who wrote a gardening column for the Chronicle and George Arthur Morphett (1869 – 13 April 1941), who taught at Clarendon, Glenburnie, Mallala and Blackwood.
  - Frederick Morphett (c. 1833 – 20 December 1897) married Susannah Hardy (c. 1835 – 24 June 1911) on 18 April 1856 lived at Laura, then Quorn (where in 1878 they were the first settlers), then in 1885 left for Port Adelaide. Two sons, Frederick William Morphett (1856–1937) and Albert Ernest Morphett (April 1862 – 5 August 1954) worked at John Dunn's flour mills at Quorn, then Port Adelaide.
- John and Elizabeth Morphett of Wittersham, near Tenterden, Kent, emigrated to South Australia on the on Isabella Watson, arrived 14 May 1846 and settled in the Clarendon area. They may have been related to the other Morphetts, as they originated from the region. Two sons were prominent in the Clarendon area: George Morphett (1820 – 17 September 1876), who died at Kooringa, and Robert Morphett (1822 – August 1872).
- Joseph Morphett (c. 1821 – 14 October 1902) and his wife emigrated on the China, arriving in South Australia 14 December 1847 (John Morphett was on the same ship; his second trip to SA). He married Mary Ann Williams (c. 1823 – 6 December 1909) at Blakiston on 1 April 1850, settled at "Truro Vene" in Truro (she came from Truro, Cornwall, but there is no suggestion they named the town; it was already so named when they arrived). Some time before 1900 they moved to Morgan. His son Joseph Morphett jnr. (3 May 1851 – 28 August 1895) married Mary Smith (c. 1863 – 24 July 1905) on 20 April 1888, lived at Morgan.
