= Joe Scalzi =

Australian politician

Giuseppe "Joe" Scalzi (born 4 July 1951) is an Australian former politician. He was a Liberal Party member of the South Australian House of Assembly between 1993 and 2006, representing the electorate of Hartley.

== Early life ==
Scalzi was a high school teacher before entering parliament.

== Political career ==
In 1993, he was elected amidst the Liberal landslide victory that year, which saw Dean Brown become Premier. Scalzi very narrowly retained his seat despite an 11.7 percent swing at the 1997 election, reducing his margin to 0.7 percent.

Joe Scalzi was a member of the public works committee that in 2001, made the deeply unpopular decision to sell the Payneham Civic Centre to JPMorgan Chase whereupon it was demolished and the land was used as the site for offices for financial services despite protests by residents.

At the 2002 election, Scalzi had to defend the most marginal Liberal seat in the state, but managed to increase his margin to 1.3 percent.

Despite this, Scalzi remained a "fairly low-key figure" only obtaining a position as a parliamentary secretary in April 2004 when he became secretary for training.

He was also one of a small number of Liberals to support a bill the cut the number of pokies in South Australia by 20 percent.

Scalzi lost his seat in the 2006 election landslide to the ALP, giving his Labor opponent Grace Portolesi a 4.6 percent margin. He failed to regain the seat at the 2010 election and lost Liberal preselection in Hartley to Vincent Tarzia for the 2014 election.

== After politics ==
From 2006 Scalzi returned to work as a high school teacher, teaching History, Studies of Society and Environment (SOSE), and Italian at Valley View Secondary School and at Glenunga International High School.

His son, Joel Scalzi, was a contestant on the 2007 season of Big Brother. When asked how far his son would make it on Big Brother he replied, in reference to his own short stature "I always knew my son would make it on to the shortlist".
