= Electoral district of Dunstan =

South Australian state electoral district

Dunstan South Australia—House of Assembly
- Interactive map of electoral district boundaries from the 2022 state election (Note: The electorate will have no change in boundaries at the 2026 state election.)
- State: South Australia
- Created: 2014
- MP: Cressida O'Hanlon
- Party: Labor
- Namesake: Don Dunstan
- Electors: 25,411 (2018)
- Area: 15.15 km^{2} (5.8 sq mi)
- Demographic: Metropolitan
- Coordinates: 34°54′39″S 138°38′8″E
Electorates around Dunstan:
Adelaide	Torrens	Hartley
Adelaide	Dunstan	Hartley; Bragg
Unley	Unley	Bragg

Dunstan is a single-member electoral district for the South Australian House of Assembly, covering the inner eastern suburbs of Beulah Park, College Park, Evandale, Firle, Hackney, Joslin, Kensington, Kensington Park, Kensington Gardens, Kent Town, Marden, Maylands, Norwood, Payneham, Payneham South, Royston Park, St Morris, St Peters, Stepney, and Trinity Gardens.

== History ==
The electorate was created in the 2012 redistribution of electoral boundaries. It was essentially a reconfigured version of Norwood, with the electoral boundaries remaining unchanged. It is named after the 35th Premier of South Australia, Don Dunstan, who represented Norwood for Labor from 1953 to 1979. The 2010 election was the first time that Labor was in government without holding Norwood.

Following the 2016 redistribution, the cityside suburbs of Rose Park and Dulwich, previously in Bragg, were added to Dunstan.

Liberal MP Steven Marshall, the last member for Norwood, successfully transferred to Dunstan at the 2014 state election while serving as Leader of the Opposition. He was reelected with a healthy swing in 2018, becoming Premier.

Ahead of the 2022 state election, Dunstan was pushed further east, picking up the Kensington towns while losing Felixstow, Glynde, Rose Park and Dulwich. This boosted the Liberal margin to a notional 7.1 percent, making Dunstan a fairly safe Liberal seat on paper. At that election, the Liberals were defeated after only one term. Although receiving his highest vote ever, Marshall himself was nearly defeated due to preferences from The Greens, surviving by only 260 votes. As a result, Dunstan became the most marginal seat in the legislature, with Marshall on a majority of 0.5 percent.

Marshall retired from politics in 2024. by-election was held for the seat that March, where the seat was narrowly won by Cressida O'Hanlon, Marshall's Labor opponent in 2022. It was the first time in over a century that the government had taken a seat from the opposition in a by-election. O'Hanlon won a full term at the 2026 state election, boosting her slender majority to 8.1 percent, on the stronger side of fairly safe. This was Labor's best result in Norwood/Dunstan since 1982.

== Members for Dunstan ==
Member	Party	Term
Steven Marshall	Liberal	2014–2024
Cressida O'Hanlon	Labor	2024–present

== Election results ==
2026 South Australian state election: Dunstan
Party	Candidate	Votes	%	±%
Labor	Cressida O'Hanlon	8,824	37.9	+2.7
Liberal	Anna Finizio	6,593	28.3	−18.4
Greens	Christel Mex	3,839	16.5	+2.8
One Nation	Victoria Pollifrone	2,725	11.7	+11.7
Independent	Ian McBryde	443	1.9	+1.9
Animal Justice	Miranda Smith	429	1.8	+1.8
Family First	Fiona Leslie	276	1.2	−3.3
Australian Family	Nick Zollo	94	0.4	+0.4
Fair Go	Ricci Stanley	82	0.4	+0.4
Total formal votes		23,305	96.0	−2.2
Informal votes		974	4.0	+2.2
Turnout		24,279	89.8	+0.1
Two-party-preferred result
Labor	Cressida O'Hanlon	13,532	58.1	+8.6
Liberal	Anna Finizio	9,773	41.9	−8.6
Labor notional gain from Liberal		Swing	+8.6	

== See also ==
- Electoral results for the district of Norwood
