= Jenn Roberts =

Australian politician

Jenn Roberts MP
- Roberts in 2026

Member of the South Australian House of Assembly for Hartley
- Incumbent
- Assumed office 21 March 2026
- Preceded by: Vincent Tarzia

Personal details
- Party: Labor
- Education: Sam Houston State University (BS)
- Committees: Environment Resources and Development; Publishing
- Website: https://www.jennrobertsmp.net/

Jennifer Leigh Roberts (born 22 July 1985) is an Australian politician from the South Australian Labor Party. She was elected as the member for Hartley in the House of Assembly at the 2026 South Australian state election.

== Biography ==
Roberts attended the Sam Houston State University in Huntsville, Texas, where she received a Bachelor of Science in interdisciplinary studies.

Roberts, a legal practice manager and former special education teacher, was announced as a candidate in the 2026 South Australian state election in October 2025, representing the South Australian Labor Party in the district of Hartley, then held by Liberal leader Vincent Tarzia. Roberts was successful, defeating Tarzia (who had been replaced by Ashton Hurn as Liberal leader) and becoming the MP for Hartley.

Since May 2026, she has sat on two committees in the Parliament of South Australia: the first environment, resources and development, the second publishing.

South Australian House of Assembly
Preceded by Vincent Tarzia	Member for Hartley; 2026–present	Incumbent
