= Royston Park, South Australia =

Royston Park
- Suburb
- Interactive map of Royston Park
- Country: Australia
- State: South Australia
- City: Adelaide
- LGA: City of Norwood Payneham St Peters

Government
  - State electorate: Dunstan
  - Federal division: Sturt

Population
  - Total: 1,246 (SAL 2021)
- Postcode: 5070

Royston Park is a suburb of Adelaide in the City of Norwood Payneham St Peters. It is a narrow suburb at a little more than 200 m wide. It was created by a subdivision in 1909. Royston Park is bordered by Joslin and Marden, along with the River Torrens.

The Royston Park Post Office closed in 1975.
