= College Park, South Australia =

College Park
- Suburb
- Interactive map of College Park
- Coordinates: 34°54′44″S 138°37′06″E
- Country: Australia
- State: South Australia
- City: Adelaide
- LGA: City of Norwood Payneham & St Peters

Government
  - State electorate: Dunstan
  - Federal division: Sturt

Area
  - Total: 0.4 km^{2} (0.15 sq mi)

Population
  - Total: 755 (SAL 2021)
- Postcode: 5069

College Park (historically known as College Town) is a small, leafy, prestigious residential suburb of Adelaide, South Australia, located approximately 2.5 kilometres north-east of the Adelaide central business district. It falls within the local government area of the City of Norwood Payneham & St Peters and carries the postcode 5069.

College Park is among the most expensive suburbs in South Australia, with a median sale price of $3.3 million as of 2024. While its headline median price is comparable to — and by some measures trails — that of Unley Park, a closer analysis reveals that College Park commands significantly higher real value per square metre. Covering just 0.36 square kilometres, it is one of the more densely settled localities in the area. By contrast, the size of Unley Park is approximately 0.9 square kilometres — more than double the land area of College Park — and its properties typically sit on much larger allotments, many exceeding 800 to 1,700 square metres. The comparatively compact allotments of College Park mean that its median house price, adjusted for land size, reflects a price per square metre that substantially exceeds that of Unley Park, making it, in practical terms, Adelaide's most expensive suburb by land value.

== Streets and property values ==
College Park is home to two of the city's most expensive streets: Trinity Street and Marlborough Street. Both streets consistently rank among the top five most expensive streets in Adelaide by median sale price, featuring grand Victorian, Edwardian, and Federation-era stone homes that rarely change hands and command prices well into the multi-millions. Marlborough Street functions as a prominent residential arterial linking College Park to nearby areas including Hackney and Kent Town, and its tree-lined character, heritage streetscapes, and proximity to elite schools have made it one of the most sought-after addresses in South Australia. Trinity Street, named in homage to the suburb's Anglican heritage connections, draws comparison with Victoria Avenue in Unley Park as an enclave of Adelaide's old-money establishment.

== Education and proximity to elite schools ==
College Park's status as one of Adelaide's most desirable family suburbs is closely tied to its proximity to the city's finest independent schools, making it particularly attractive to families prioritising private school education.

=== Boys' schools ===
St Peter's College ("Saints"), one of Australia's most prestigious independent boys' schools, is the institution after which the suburb itself was named. The school is situated on 32 hectares of landscaped grounds only 3 kilometres from the Adelaide central business district on Hackney Road and North Terrace in the suburb of Hackney — with College Park and St Peters as neighbouring suburbs named after the school. Founded in 1847, its three campuses are located on the Hackney Road site near the Adelaide Parklands. The school's boundary is, in effect, a short walk from College Park's northern edge, making it the most immediate neighbour of the suburb's prestigious residential streets.

Prince Alfred College ("PAC"), the other great Anglican rival school and perennial competitor to Saints, is located on Dequetteville Terrace in Kent Town. Prince Alfred College is a private, independent, day and boarding school for boys, located on Dequetteville Terrace, Kent Town, near the centre of Adelaide, South Australia. Kent Town directly adjoins College Park to the south-west, placing PAC within easy walking or cycling distance of most College Park addresses. Together, Saints and PAC are widely regarded as the two finest boys' schools in South Australia, and the convenience of accessing both from College Park is a significant driver of the suburb's sustained price premium.

=== Girls' and co-educational schools ===
Wilderness School, consistently ranked the top girls' school in South Australia and one of the top ten highest-achieving schools in Australia, is located in Medindie. Wilderness School is an independent, non-denominational Christian, day and boarding school for girls, located in Medindie, an inner northern suburb of Adelaide, South Australia. The school is accessible from College Park in approximately ten to fifteen minutes by car or bus, sitting north of the River Torrens. Wikipedia

St Andrew's School, widely regarded as one of South Australia's finest co-educational primary schools, is located in the adjacent suburb of Walkerville. St Andrew's School is an independent, co-educational, Anglican primary school, located at Walkerville, an inner eastern suburb of Adelaide, South Australia. In 2018, its Year 7 NAPLAN performance was ranked first out of over 125 primary schools in Adelaide. Walkerville borders College Park to the north, making St Andrew's effectively a neighbourhood school for many College Park families.

== Demographics ==
As of the 2021 Australian Census, College Park had a population of 755 residents, with a median age of 42 years. The suburb exhibits high socioeconomic indicators, including a median weekly household income of $2,454 and 48.7% of adults holding a bachelor's degree or higher, well above state averages. Notable for its low unemployment rate of 3.1% and a professional workforce, with 42.1% employed in professional occupations, College Park remains a quiet, family-oriented enclave.

== Notable residents and alumni ==
- Lionel Logue (1880–1953) is the suburb's most celebrated native son. Born in College Town (now College Park) on 26 February 1880, Logue became an Australian speech and language therapist best known for his long-term collaboration with King George VI to overcome the monarch's severe stammer. He attended Prince Alfred College in Adelaide from 1889 to 1896. His story was immortalised in the Academy Award-winning 2010 film The King's Speech, in which he was portrayed by Geoffrey Rush. The Famous People
- Catherine Helen Spence (1825–1910), widely eulogised as the "Grand Old Woman of Australia," resided on Trinity Street, College Park. A Scottish-born writer, lay preacher, and social reformer who emigrated to South Australia in 1839, Spence became one of the most influential public figures in colonial Australian history. She was Australia's first female political candidate, standing in the 1897 Australasian Federal Convention election, and a tireless advocate for women's suffrage, proportional representation, girls' education, and child welfare. She co-founded South Australia's first foster care system and authored Clara Morison (1854), the first novel about Australia written by a woman, as well as Australia's first civics textbook, The Laws We Live Under (1880). In 2001, her portrait was printed on the Australian five-dollar note to mark the centenary of Federation. The State Library of South Australia, a street in the Adelaide CBD, and the federal electorate of Spence are all named in her honour. The Spence family's deep roots in College Park extended across generations: her mother, Helen Brodie Spence, died at the family's College Park residence in 1887; her father, David Spence, was Adelaide's first Town Clerk; and her brother, John Brodie Spence, served as South Australia's Commissioner of Public Works and Chief Secretary.

== Transport and amenities ==
Key bus routes include the 174 (Paradise Interchange to City via Payneham Road), 557, and 558, providing frequent access to the city centre approximately 4 km away, with travel times typically under 15 minutes during peak hours. The suburb's location on Payneham Road places it within easy reach of the Norwood dining and shopping strip along The Parade, the Adelaide Botanic Garden, and the East End precinct.

== History and heritage ==
- College Park Post Office opened on 21 October 1946.
- Lionel Logue was born in this suburb on 26 February 1880.

College Park contains a number of heritage-listed sites, including:

- 1–13 Payneham Road: Bon Marche Building
- 15 Payneham Road: Bell's Plumbers Shop
- 9 Trinity Street: Airlie Hostel.

== Religion ==
Catholic church services are celebrated in Hungarian at the suburb's Hungarian Catholic Community Centre.
