= Glynde, South Australia =

Glynde
- Suburb
- Interactive map of Glynde
- Country: Australia
- State: South Australia
- City: Adelaide
- LGA: City of Norwood Payneham St Peters
- Established: 1856

Government
  - State electorate: Dunstan
  - Federal division: Sturt

Area
  - Total: 0.9 km^{2} (0.35 sq mi)

Population
  - Total: 2,102 (SAL 2021)
- Postcode: 5070

Glynde is a suburb of Adelaide in the City of Norwood Payneham St Peters.

It was laid out in 1856 by Edward Castres Gwynne, whose father had been the rector of the Sussex village of Glynde; he also named the adjacent suburb of Firle. He owned a large estate near the village, where he had an orangery covering eight acres. The Duke of Edinburgh reportedly once visited Gwynne's estate to find the family away from home.

The historic Glynde House is listed on the South Australian Heritage Register.
