= Felixstow, South Australia =

Felixstow
- Suburb
- Interactive map of Felixstow
- Country: Australia
- State: South Australia
- City: Adelaide
- LGA: City of Norwood Payneham St Peters

Government
  - State electorate: Dunstan
  - Federal division: Sturt

Area
  - Total: 1.1 km^{2} (0.42 sq mi)

Population
  - Total: 2,477 (SAL 2021)
- Postcode: 5070

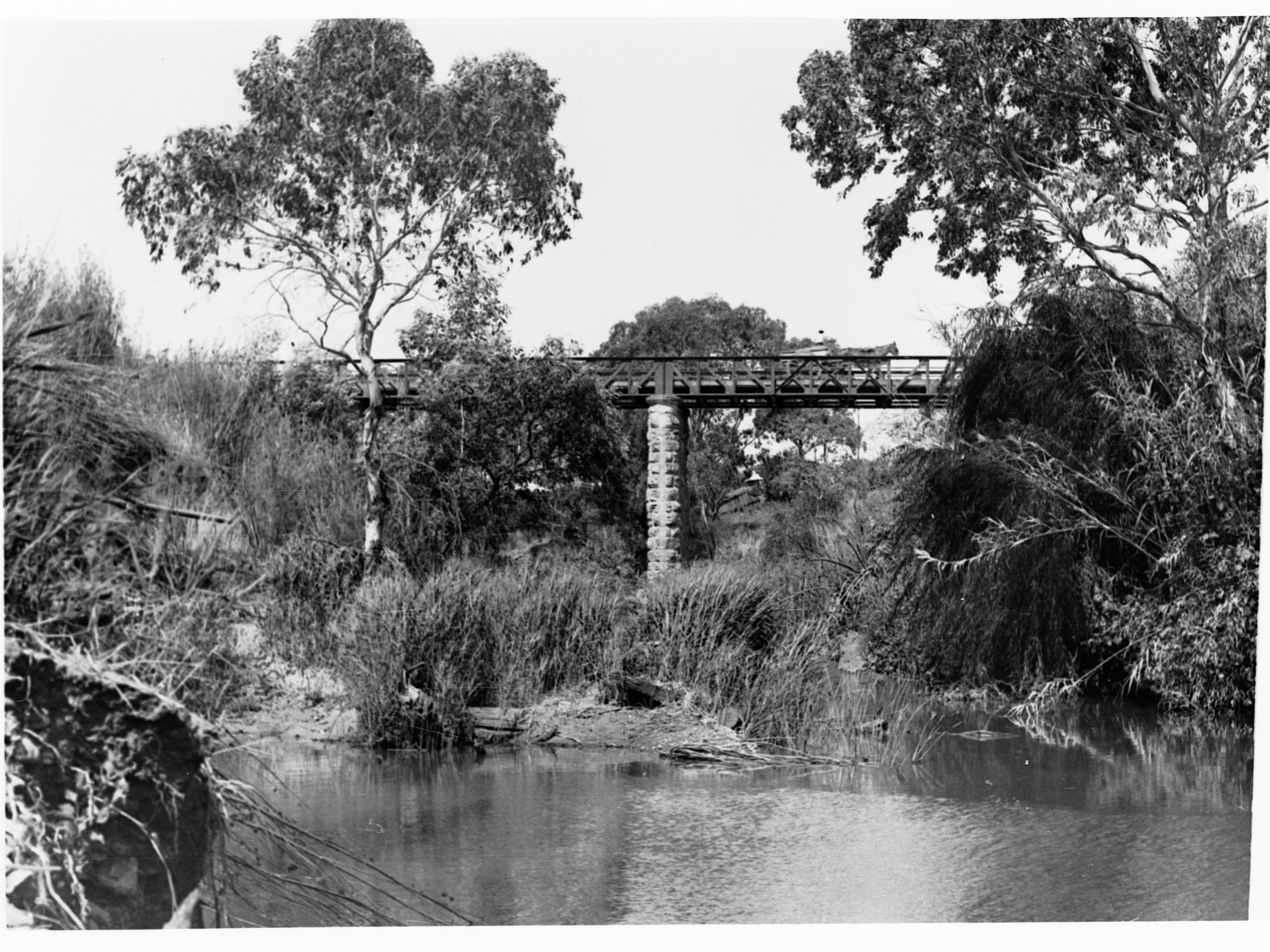
Horse and cart on Felixstow Bridge over River Torrens

Felixstow is a suburb of Adelaide, situated in the City of Norwood Payneham St Peters. It is located approximately 6.7 km (4.2 mi) from the Adelaide city centre.

It was reportedly named by Thomas Stow, who had been the first European to take up pastoral duties in the area, by combining the Latin word for "happy" with the Old English word for "place". His son, Augustine Stow, later had a vineyard at Felixstow.

Felixstow Post Office opened as Hectorville Post Office on 1 July 1882 and was renamed Felixstow Post Office on 15 August 1963.

The historic Forsyth House (now the Aldersgate Nursing Home) is listed on the South Australian Heritage Register.
