= Firle, South Australia =

Firle
- Suburb
- Interactive map of Firle
- Country: Australia
- State: South Australia
- City: Adelaide
- LGA: City of Norwood Payneham St Peters

Government
  - State electorate: Dunstan
  - Federal division: Sturt

Population
  - Total: 1,508 (SAL 2021)
- Postcode: 5070

Firle is a suburb of Adelaide in the City of Norwood Payneham & St Peters in South Australia.

== History ==
The suburb was laid out in 1881 by Edward Castres Gwynne who was born at Lewes in Sussex, England, near the towns of Firle and Glynde, where his father was a rector. Glynde is the name of a suburb which neighbours Firle.

Gwynne came to South Australia on the Lord Goderich in April 1838 and purchased 500 acres of land on the foothills east of Adelaide. He was elected to the first representative Parliament in 1857 and twenty years later was appointed a judge of the Supreme Court of South Australia. Upon his retirement in 1881 he laid out the suburb on sections 303 and 265, Hundred of Adelaide. Initially, parts of Gwynne's estate was subdivided into large blocks which were used by settlers for large market gardens, orchards and paddocks of wheat and hay. Gradually the area developed as a residential suburb as transport services such as trams and buses were introduced in the early 1900s. Post-war migrant settlement also brought many people to the area.

Firle House was built by Henry William Martin in about 1882, but it was demolished in the 1980s. The original family homestead of Edward Gwynne, known as 'Glynde House' has managed to survive at 54 Avenue Road, Glynde, and is on the South Australian State Heritage Register.
