= Payneham South, South Australia =

Payneham South
- Suburb
- Interactive map of Payneham South
- Country: Australia
- State: South Australia
- City: Adelaide
- LGA: City of Norwood Payneham St Peters

Government
  - State electorate: Dunstan
  - Federal division: Sturt

Population
  - Total: 1,731 (SAL 2021)
- Postcode: 5070

Payneham South is a suburb of Adelaide in the City of Norwood Payneham St Peters. It has traditionally been market gardens but is currently undergoing a building boom in which many smaller houses are being built.

Payneham South Post Office closed in 1982.

Payneham Cemetery is located on Marian Road.
