= Adelaide =

Capital city of South Australia

Adelaide Tarndanya (Kaurna)
- City
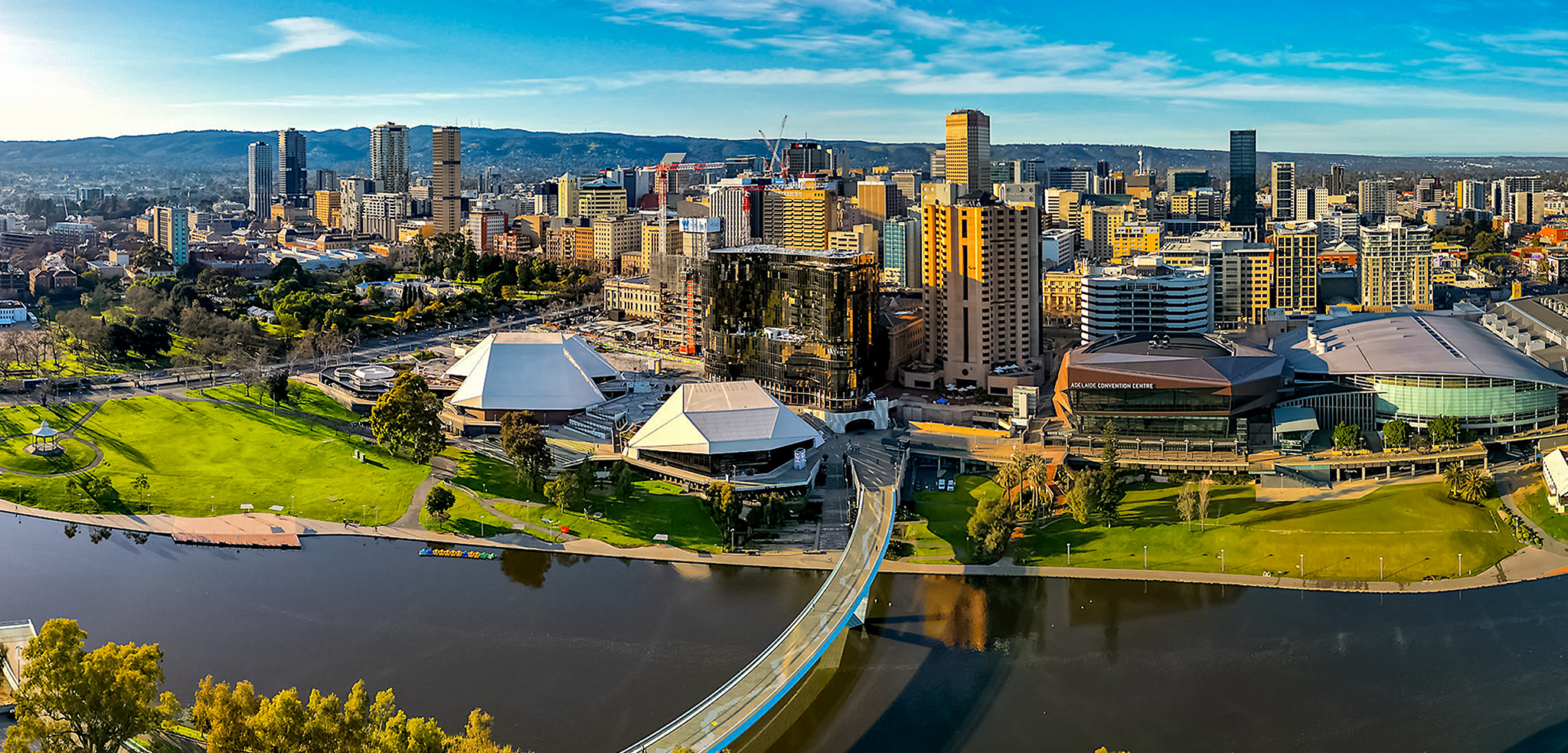
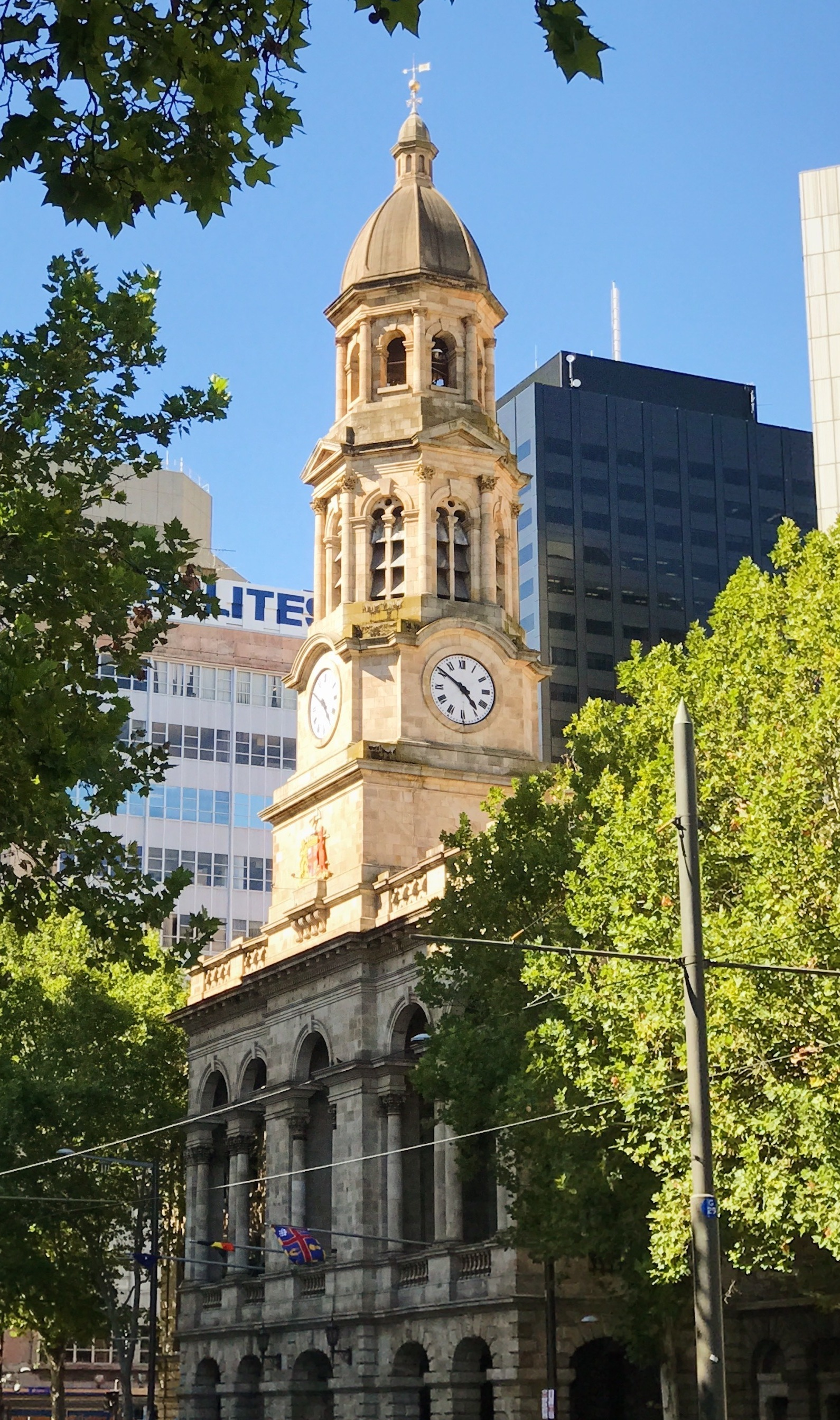
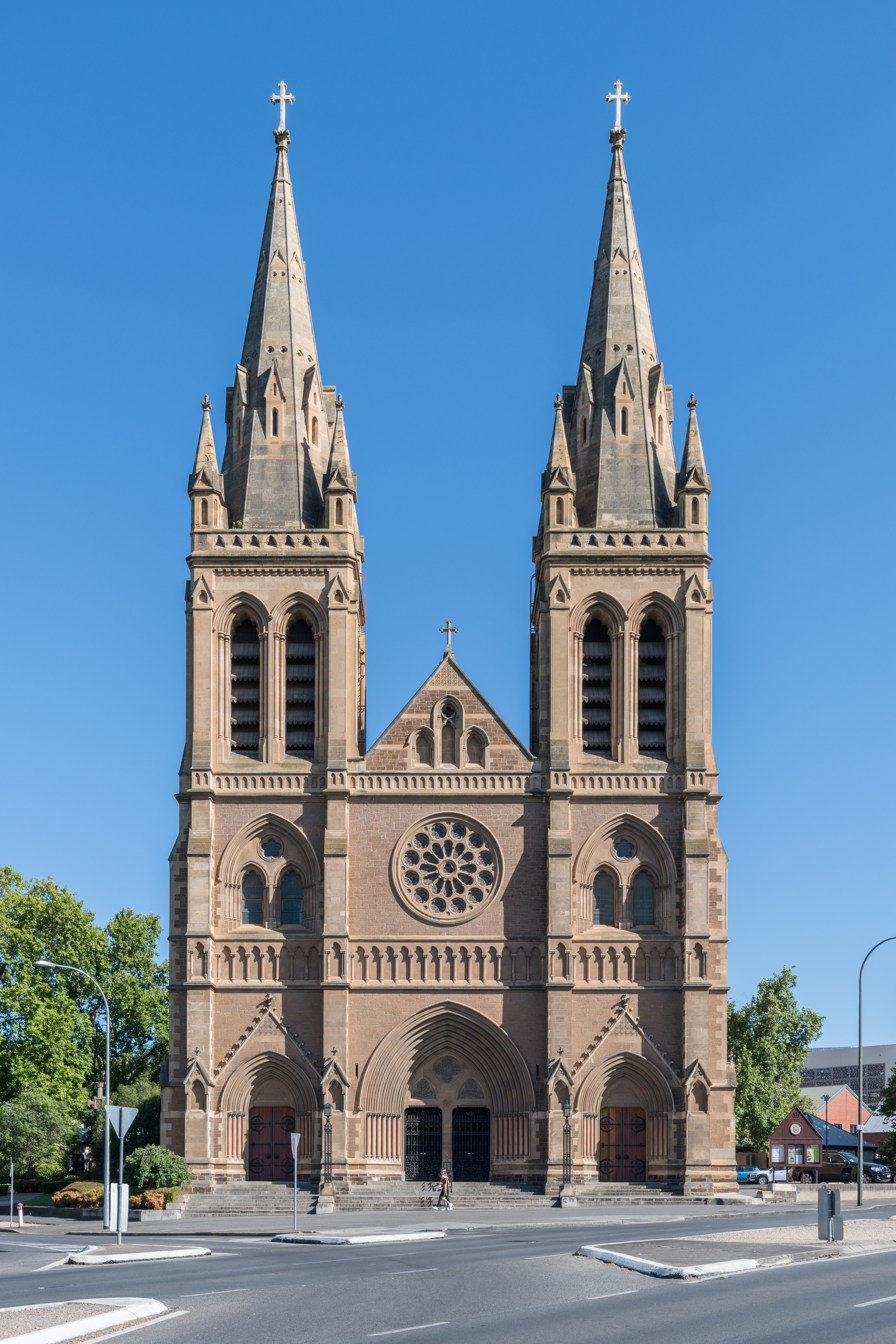
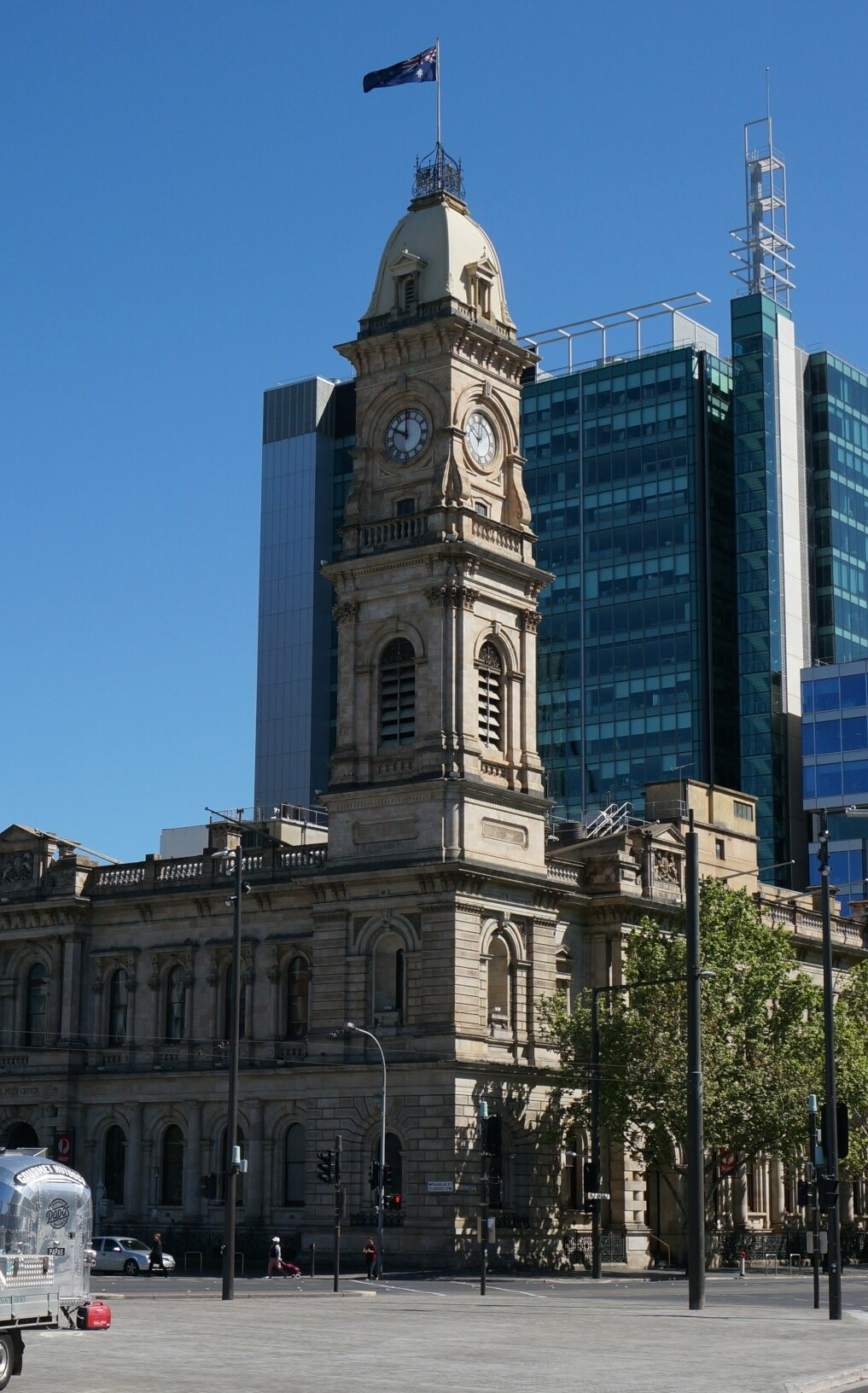
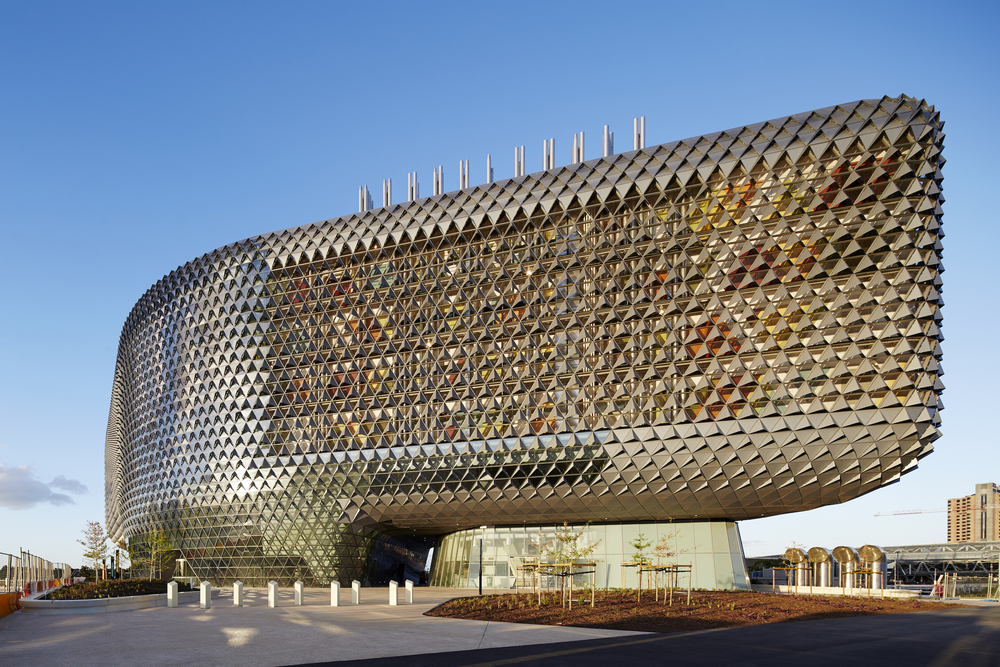
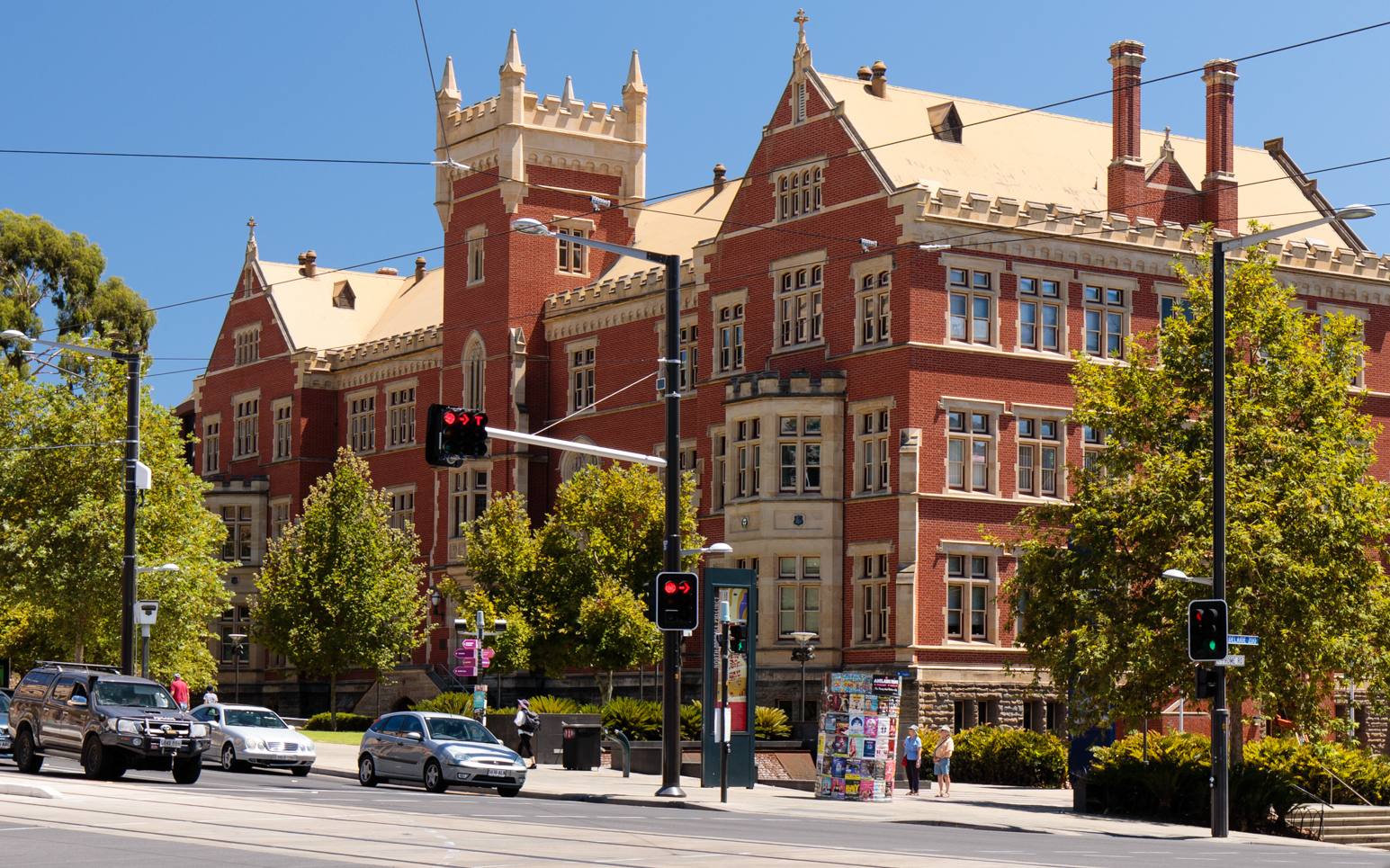
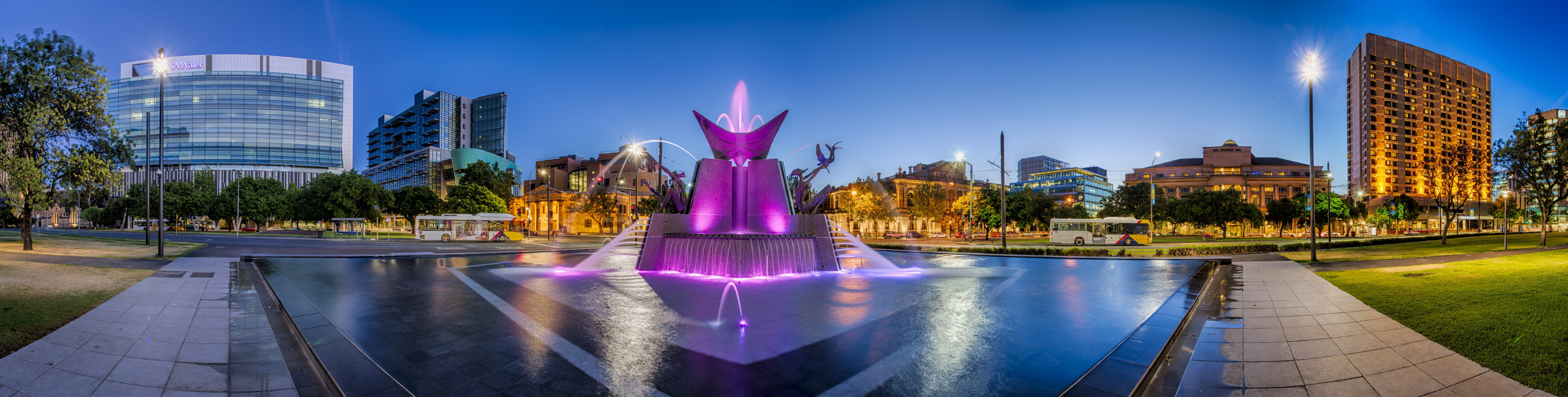
- Skyline of Adelaide and the River Torrens Adelaide Town Hall St Peter's Cathedral General Post Office SAHMRI Adelaide University (City East) Victoria Square

- Flag Seal

- Interactive map of Adelaide
- Coordinates: 34°55′39″S 138°36′00″E
- Country: Australia
- State: South Australia
- LGA: 19 municipalities across Metropolitan Adelaide
- Location: 730 km (450 mi) NW of Melbourne; 1,160 km (720 mi) West of Canberra; 1,373 km (853 mi) West of Sydney; 2,007 km (1,247 mi) SW of Brisbane; 2,607 km (1,620 mi) East of Perth
- Established: 28 December 1836

Government
  - State electorate: Various (34)
  - Federal division: Spence, Makin, Hindmarsh, Adelaide, Sturt, Boothby, Kingston

Area
  - Total: 3,259.8 km^{2} (1,258.6 sq mi)

Population
  - Total: 1,469,163 (2024) (5th)
  - Density: 450/km^{2} (1,200/sq mi)

GDP (nominal)
  - Total: A$85.25 billion (2019) (US$60.97 billion)
  - Per capita: A$62,600 (2019) (US$44,771.85)
- Time zone: UTC+9:30 (ACST)
  - Summer (DST): UTC+10:30 (ACDT)
- Mean max temp: 21.9 °C (71.4 °F)
- Mean min temp: 11.9 °C (53.4 °F)
- Annual rainfall: 536.5 mm (21.12 in)

Adelaide (/ˈædɪleɪd/ AD-il-ayd; Kaurna: Tarndanya [ˈd̪̥aɳɖaɲa]) is the capital and most populous city of South Australia, as well as the fifth-most populous city in Australia. The name "Adelaide" may refer to either Greater Adelaide (including the Adelaide Hills) or the Adelaide central business district; the demonym Adelaidean is used to denote the city and the residents of Adelaide. The traditional owners of the Adelaide region are the Kaurna, with the name Tarndanya referring to the area of the city centre and surrounding Park Lands, in the Kaurna language. Adelaide is situated on the Adelaide Plains north of the Fleurieu Peninsula, between the Gulf St Vincent in the west and the Mount Lofty Ranges in the east. Its metropolitan area encompasses over 430 suburbs, extending 96 km (60 mi) from Gawler in the north to Sellicks Beach in the south and 20 km (12 mi) from the western coast to the eastern foothills of the Mount Lofty Ranges.

Named in honour of Adelaide of Saxe-Meiningen, wife of King William IV, the city was founded in 1836 as the planned capital for a freely settled British colony in Australia. Colonel William Light designed the city centre in a grid layout with wide boulevards and large public squares, surrounded by parks, now listed as national heritage. Colonial Adelaide became known as the "City of Churches" due to its diversity of faiths, being Australia's third-most populous city until the postwar era.

Today, Adelaide is a popular travel destination and hosts many festivals and sporting events, such as the Adelaide 500, Tour Down Under, Gather Round, LIV Golf Adelaide, the Adelaide International, the Adelaide Fringe and the Australian MotoGP Grand Prix from 2027. The city also gave rise to Australia's automotive industry, having also hosted the first Australian Grand Prix under the Formula One banner between 1985 and 1995. Adelaide is known for its food and wine industries, its coastline and hills, and defence and manufacturing industries. The city has consistently ranked within the top-ten most liveable cities globally for much of the 21st century.

Adelaide is South Australia's government and commercial centre, with activity concentrated in the city's central business district along the boulevards of North Terrace and King William Street. It has also been classed as a Gamma + level global city as categorised by the Globalization and World Cities Research Network. Adelaide is connected by significant bus, train and tram networks, operated by Adelaide Metro, with its primary railway terminus at the Adelaide railway station. The city is also served by Adelaide Airport and Port Adelaide.

== History ==
=== Before European settlement ===
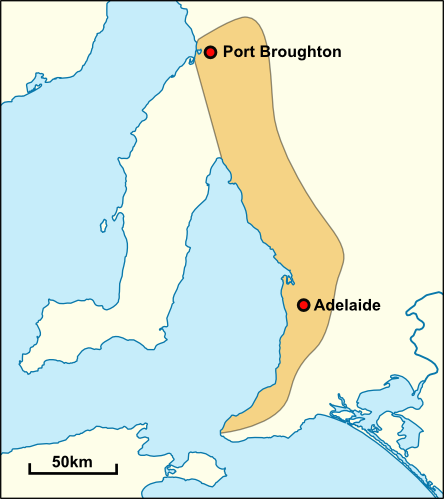
The approximate extent of Kaurna territory, based on the description by Amery (2000)

The amount of time Aboriginal people have been living in the area around modern-day Adelaide has been described as "millennia", "tens of thousands of years", "thousands of generations", or "innumerable generations". At Hallett Cove Conservation Park in Adelaide's southern suburbs, archaeological evidence of Aboriginal culture has been found dating back 40,000 years.

The area was originally inhabited by the Kaurna people, one of many Aboriginal tribes in South Australia. The city and parklands area also known as Tarndanyangga, (Note: A dual name for Victoria Square in the Kaurna language) Tandanya, (Note: Presently the shortened name of Tandanya National Aboriginal Cultural Institute) Tarndanya or Tarntanya. The name means 'male red kangaroo rock', referring to a rock formation on the site that has now been destroyed.

The surrounding area was an open, grassy plain with patches of trees and shrubs, which had been managed by hundreds of generations. Kaurna country encompassed the plains stretching north and south of Tarntanya, as well as the wooded foothills of the Mt Lofty Ranges. The River Torrens was known as the Karrawirra Pari (Red Gum forest river). About 300 Kaurna populated the Adelaide area, and were referred to by the settlers as the Cowandilla.

The more than 20 local clans across the plain lived seminomadic lives, with extensive mound settlements where huts were built repeatedly over centuries and a complex social structure, including a class of sorcerers separated from regular society.

Within a few decades of European settlement of South Australia, Kaurna culture was almost completely lost, with the last speaker of Kaurna language having died in 1929. Extensive documentation by early missionaries and other researchers has enabled a modern revival of both, which has included a commitment by local and state governments to rename or include Kaurna names for many local places.

=== 19th century ===
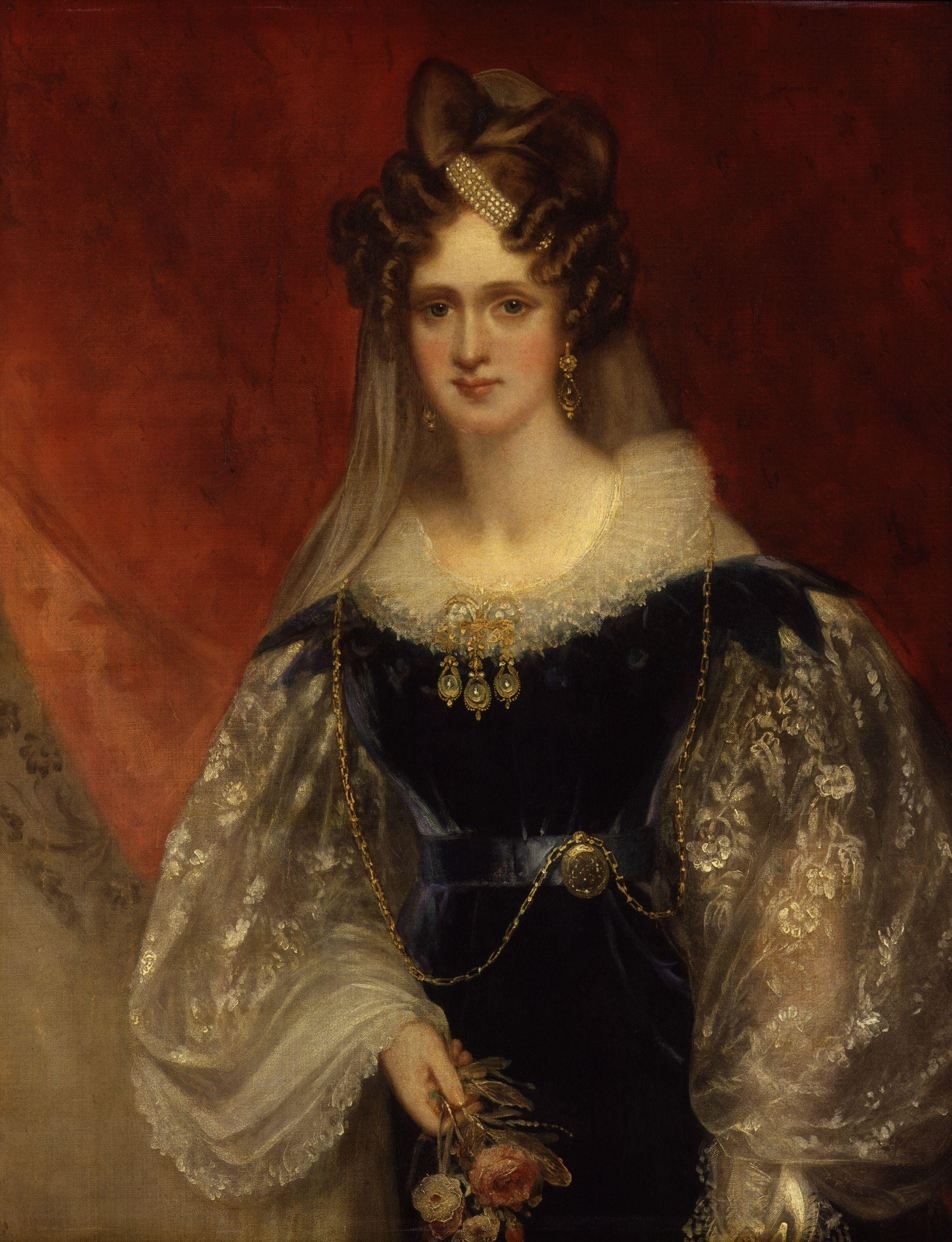
Queen Adelaide, after whom the city was named

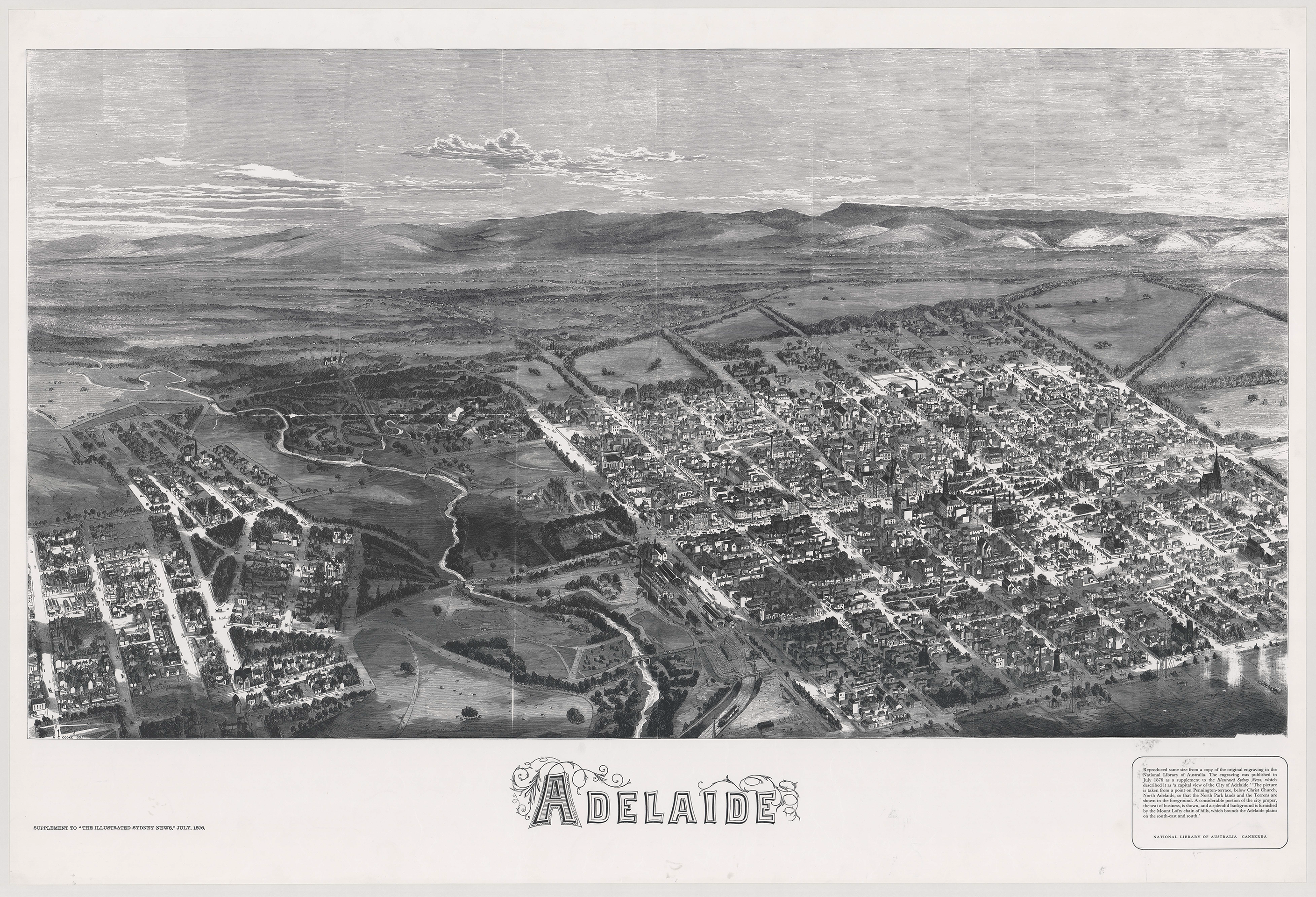
In July 1876, the Illustrated Sydney News published a special supplement that included an early aerial view of the City of Adelaide: (South) Adelaide (the CBD), River Torrens, and portion of North Adelaide from a point above Strangways Terrace, North Adelaide

Based on the ideas of Edward Gibbon Wakefield about colonial reform, Robert Gouger petitioned the British government to create a new colony in Australia, resulting in the passage of the South Australia Act 1834. Physical establishment of the colony began with the arrival of the first British colonisers in February 1836, followed by the commencement of colonial government in South Australia on 28 December 1836. Proclaimed by the governor near The Old Gum Tree in what is now the suburb of Glenelg North, this day is annually commemorated in South Australia as Proclamation Day. Named for Queen Adelaide, the site of the colony's capital was surveyed and laid out by Colonel William Light, the first surveyor-general of South Australia, with his own original, unique and topographically sensitive design.

Adelaide was established as a planned colony of free settlers, promising civil liberties and freedom from religious persecution, based upon the ideas of Edward Gibbon Wakefield. Wakefield had read accounts of Australian settlement while in prison in London for attempting to abduct an heiress, and realised that the eastern colonies suffered from a lack of available labour, due to the practice of giving land grants to all arrivals. Wakefield's idea was for the Government to survey and sell the land at a rate that would maintain land values high enough to be unaffordable for labourers and journeymen. Funds raised from the sale of land were to be used to bring out working-class emigrants, who would have to work hard for the monied settlers to ever afford their own land. As a result of this policy, Adelaide does not share the convict settlement history of other Australian cities like Sydney, Brisbane and Hobart.

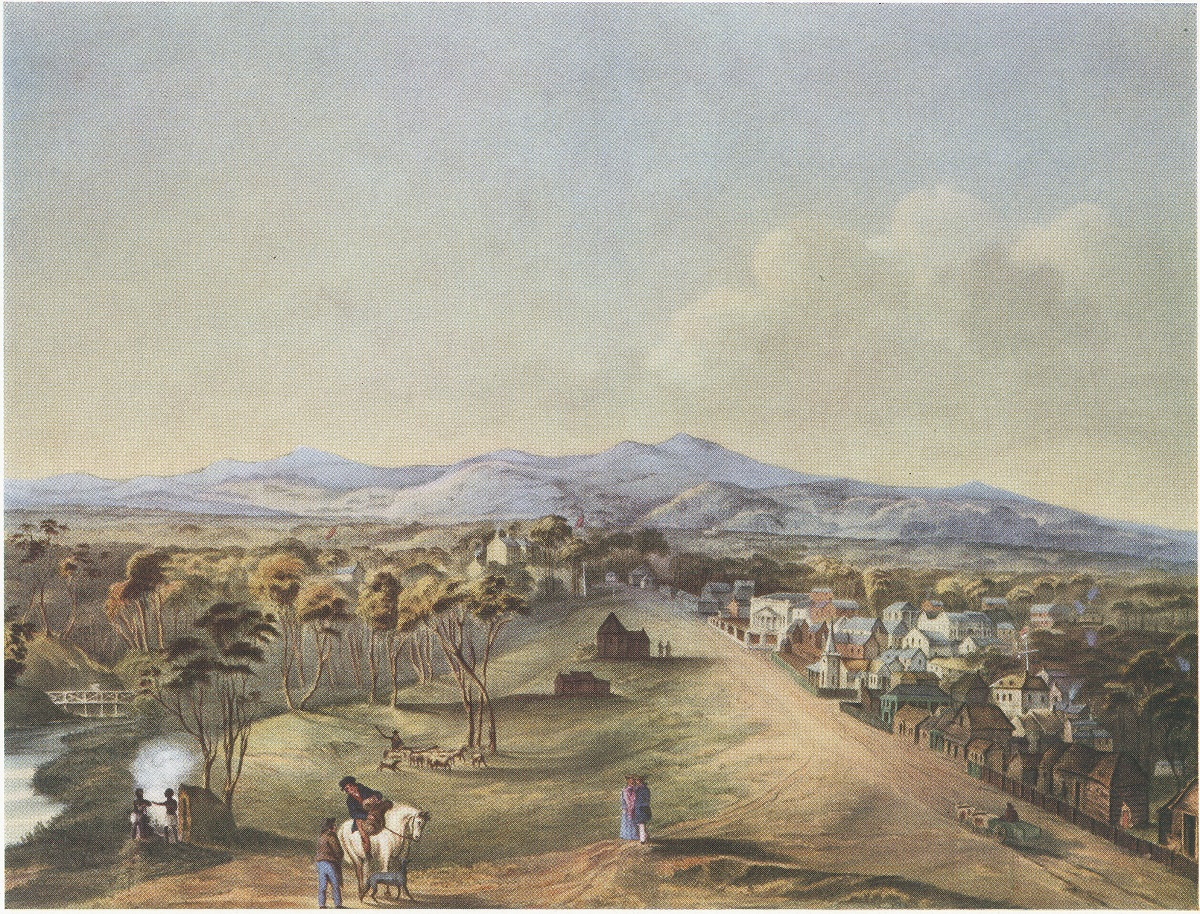
North Terrace in 1841

As it was believed that in a colony of free settlers there would be little crime, no provision was made for a gaol (Prison) in Colonel Light's 1837 plan. But by mid-1837 the South Australian Register was warning of escaped convicts from New South Wales and tenders for a temporary gaol were sought. Following a burglary, a murder, and two attempted murders in Adelaide during March 1838, Governor Hindmarsh created the South Australian Police Force (now the South Australia Police) in April 1838 under 21-year-old Henry Inman. The first sheriff, Samuel Smart, was wounded during a robbery, and on 2 May 1838 one of the offenders, Michael Magee, became the first person to be hanged in South Australia. William Baker Ashton was appointed governor of the temporary gaol in 1839, and in 1840 George Strickland Kingston was commissioned to design Adelaide's new gaol. Construction of Adelaide Gaol commenced in 1841.

Adelaide's early history was marked by economic uncertainty and questionable leadership. The first governor of South Australia, John Hindmarsh, clashed frequently with others, in particular the Resident Commissioner, James Hurtle Fisher. The rural area surrounding Adelaide was surveyed by Light in preparation to sell a total of over 405 km^{2} (156 sq mi) of land. Adelaide's early economy started to get on its feet in 1838 with the arrival of livestock from Victoria, New South Wales and Tasmania. Wool production provided an early basis for the South Australian economy. By 1860, wheat farms had been established from Encounter Bay in the south to Clare in the north.

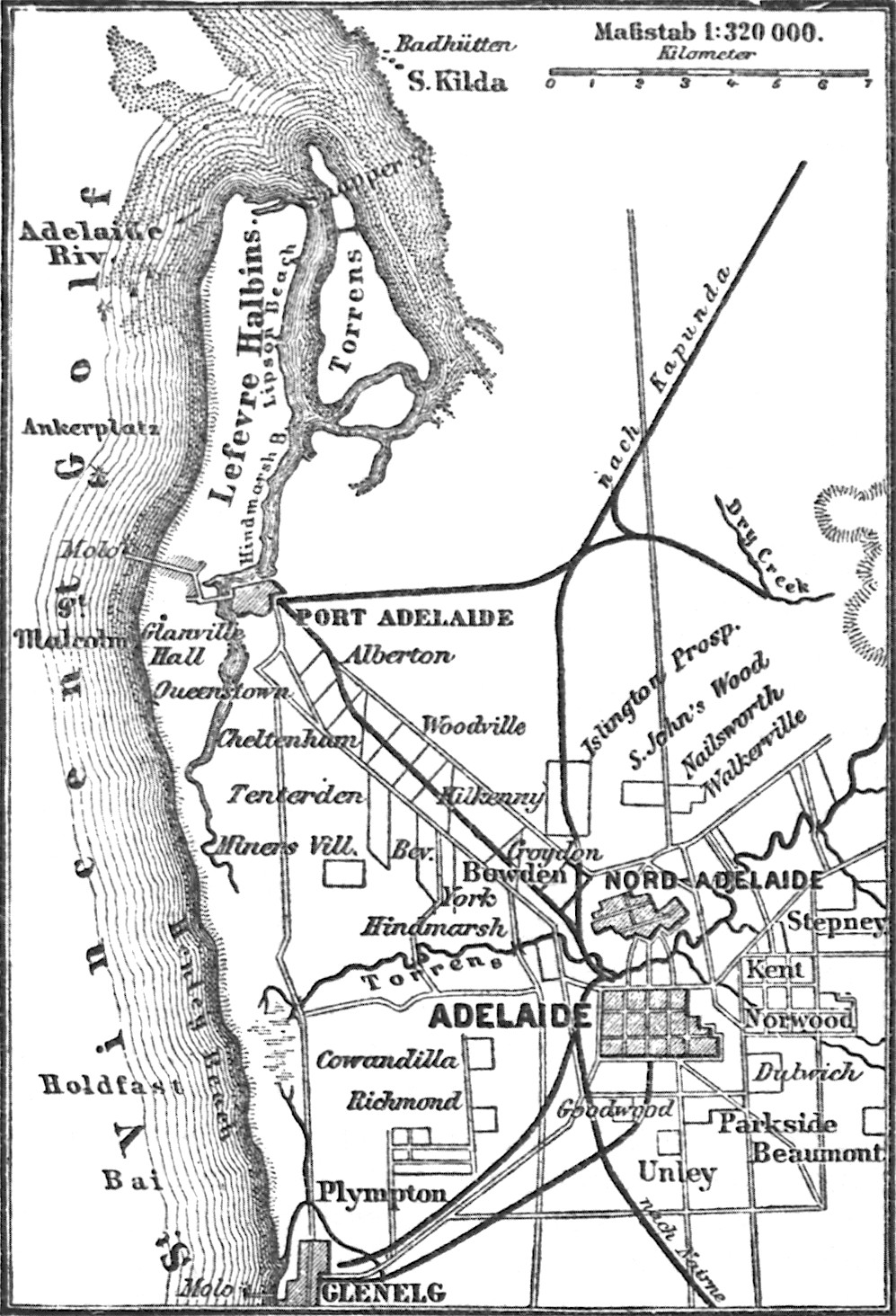
1890 map of Adelaide, showing the gradual development of its urban layout

George Gawler took over from Hindmarsh in late 1838 and, despite being under orders from the Select Committee on South Australia in Britain not to undertake any public works, promptly oversaw construction of a governor's house, the Adelaide Gaol, police barracks, a hospital, a customs house and a wharf at Port Adelaide. He was criticised for his response to the Maria massacre. Gawler was recalled and replaced by George Edward Grey in 1841. Grey slashed public expenditure against heavy opposition, although its impact was negligible at this point: silver was discovered in Glen Osmond that year, agriculture was well underway, and other mines sprung up all over the state, aiding Adelaide's commercial development. The city exported meat, wool, wine, fruit and wheat by the time Grey left in 1845, contrasting with a low point in 1842 when one-third of Adelaide houses were abandoned.

Trade links with the rest of the Australian states were established after the Murray River was successfully navigated in 1853 by Francis Cadell, an Adelaide resident. South Australia became a self-governing colony in 1856 with the ratification of a new constitution by the British parliament. Secret ballots were introduced, and a bicameral parliament was elected on 9 March 1857, by which time 109,917 people lived in the province.

In 1860, the Thorndon Park reservoir was opened, providing an alternative water source to the now turbid River Torrens. Gas street lighting was implemented in 1867, the University of Adelaide was founded in 1874, the South Australian Art Gallery opened in 1881 and the Happy Valley Reservoir opened in 1896. In the 1890s Australia was affected by a severe economic depression, ending a hectic era of land booms and tumultuous expansionism. Financial institutions in Melbourne and banks in Sydney closed. The national fertility rate fell and immigration was reduced to a trickle.

The value of South Australia's exports nearly halved. Drought and poor harvests from 1884 compounded the problems, with some families leaving for Western Australia. Adelaide was not as badly hit as the larger gold-rush cities of Sydney and Melbourne, and silver and lead discoveries at Broken Hill provided some relief. Only one year of deficit was recorded, but the price paid was retrenchments and lean public spending. Wine and copper were the only industries not to suffer a downturn.

=== 20th century ===
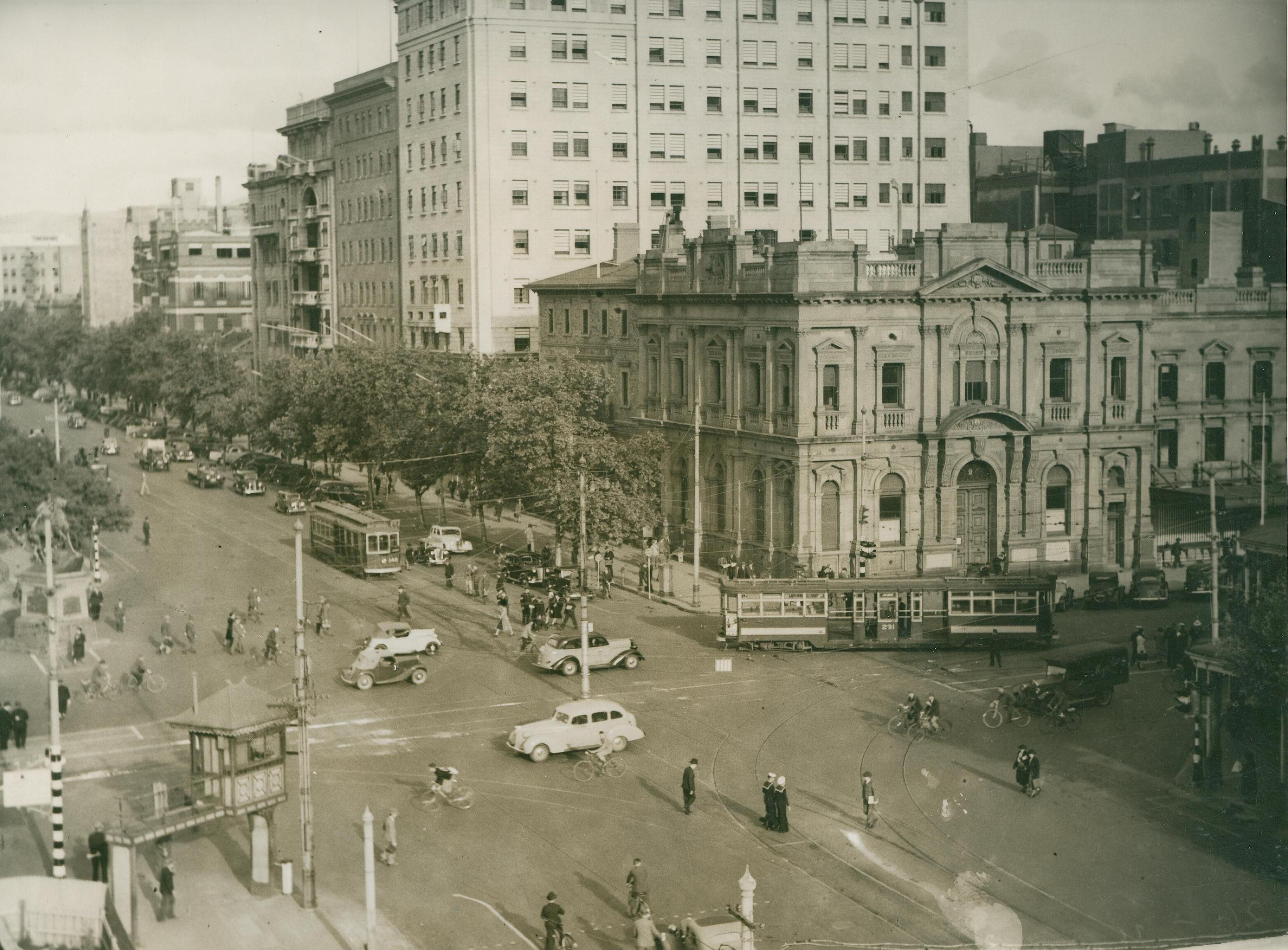
The intersection of North Terrace and King William Street viewed from Parliament House, 1938

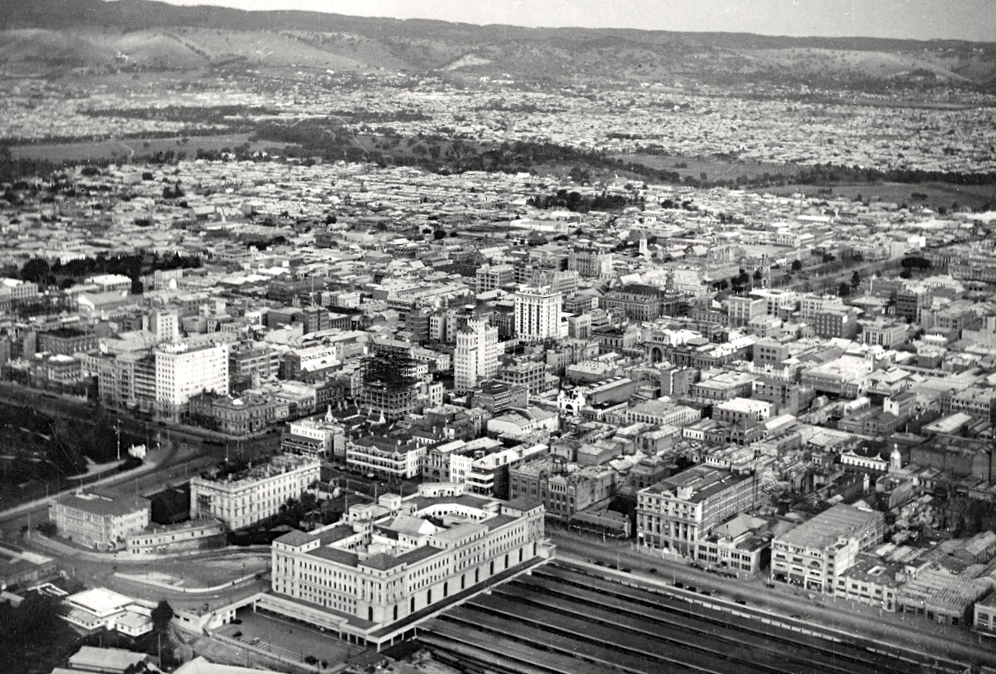
An aerial view of Adelaide in 1935, when it was Australia's third largest city. Of note is that only the eastern half of the new Parliament House (to left of station) had been completed.

Adelaide was Australia's third largest city for most of the 20th century. Electric street lighting was introduced in 1900 and electric trams were transporting passengers in 1909. 28,000 men were sent to fight in World War I. Historian F. K. Crowley examined the reports of visitors in the early 20th century, noting that "many visitors to Adelaide admired the foresighted planning of its founders", as well as pondering the riches of the young city.

Adelaide enjoyed a postwar boom, entering a time of relative prosperity. Its population grew, and it became the third most populous metropolitan area in the country, after Sydney and Melbourne. Its prosperity was short-lived, with the return of droughts and the Great Depression of the 1930s. It later returned to fortune under strong government leadership. Secondary industries helped reduce the state's dependence on primary industries. World War II brought industrial stimulus and diversification to Adelaide under the Playford Government, which advocated Adelaide as a safe place for manufacturing due to its less vulnerable location. Shipbuilding was expanded at the nearby port of Whyalla.

The South Australian Government in this period built on former wartime manufacturing industries but neglected cultural facilities which meant South Australia's economy lagged behind. International manufacturers like Holden and Chrysler made use of these factories around the Adelaide area in suburbs like Elizabeth, completing its transformation from an agricultural service centre to a 20th-century motor city. The Mannum–Adelaide pipeline brought River Murray water to Adelaide in 1955 and an airport opened at West Beach in 1955. Flinders University and the Flinders Medical Centre were established in the 1960s at Bedford Park, south of the city. Today, Flinders Medical Centre is one of the largest teaching hospitals in South Australia. In the post-war years around the early 1960s, Adelaide was surpassed by Brisbane as Australia's third largest city.

The Dunstan Governments of the 1970s saw something of an Adelaide "cultural revival", establishing a wide array of social reforms. The city became noted for its progressivism as South Australia became the first Australian state or territory to decriminalise homosexuality between consenting adults in 1975. Adelaide became a centre for the arts, building upon the biennial "Adelaide Festival of Arts" that commenced in 1960. The State Bank collapsed in 1991 during an economic recession. The effects lasted until 2004, when Standard & Poor's reinstated South Australia's AAA credit rating. Adelaide's tallest building, completed in 2020, is called the Adelaidean and is located at 11 Frome Street.

=== 21st century ===
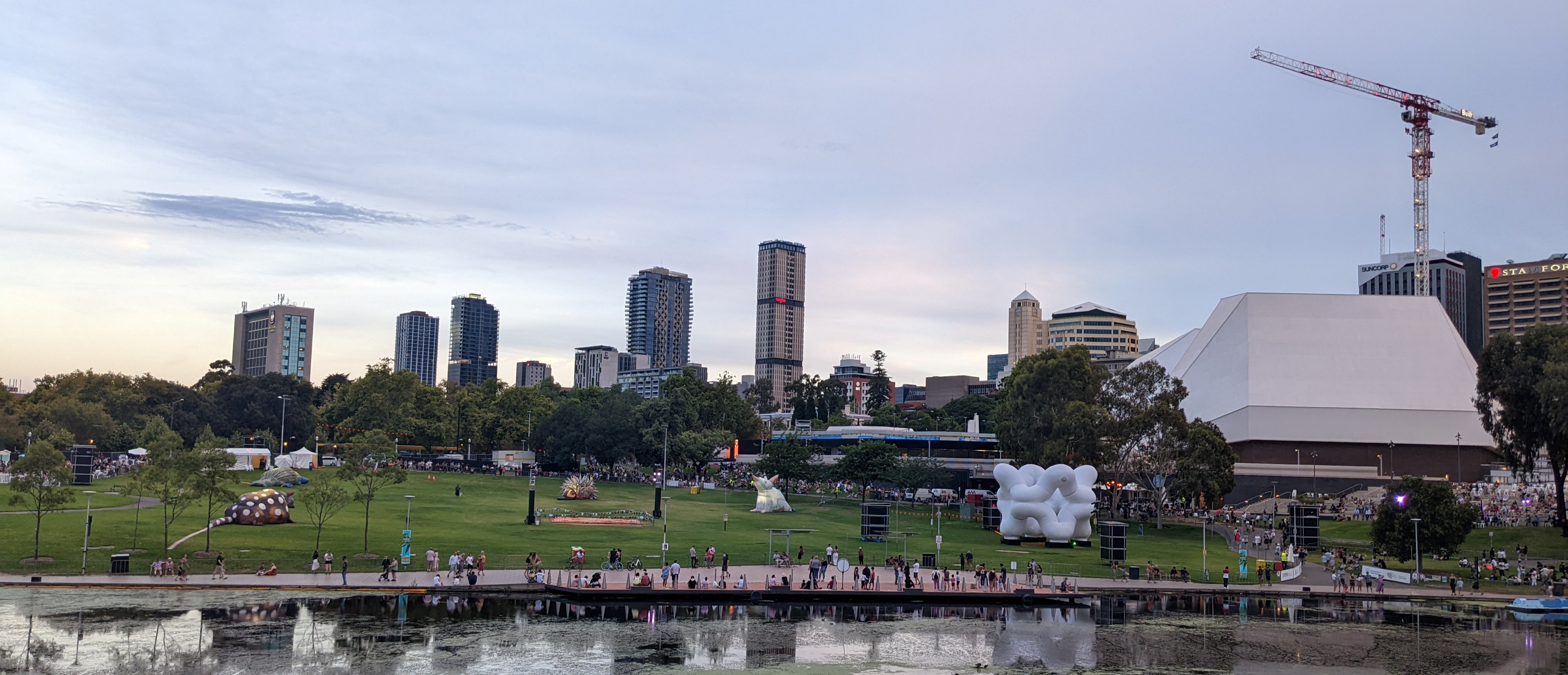
Adelaide's eastern skyline during 2022 Australia Day celebrations

In the early years of the 21st century, a significant increase in the state government's spending on Adelaide's infrastructure occurred. The Rann government invested A$535 million in a major upgrade of the Adelaide Oval to enable Australian Football League to be played in the city centre and more than A$2 billion to build a new Royal Adelaide Hospital on land adjacent to the Adelaide Railway Station. The Glenelg tramline was extended through the city to Hindmarsh down to East Terrace and the suburban railway line extended south to Seaford.

Following a period of stagnation in the 1990s and 2000s, Adelaide began several major developments and redevelopments. The Adelaide Convention Centre was redeveloped and expanded at a cost of A$350 million beginning in 2012. Three historic buildings were adapted for modern use: the Torrens Building in Victoria Square as the Adelaide campus for Carnegie Mellon University, University College London, and Torrens University; the Stock Exchange building as the Science Exchange of the Royal Institution Australia; and the Glenside Psychiatric Hospital as the Adelaide Studios of the SA Film Corporation. The government invested more than A$2 billion to build a desalination plant, powered by renewable energy, as an "insurance policy" against droughts affecting Adelaide's water supply. The Adelaide Festival, Fringe, and Womadelaide became annual events.

== Geography ==
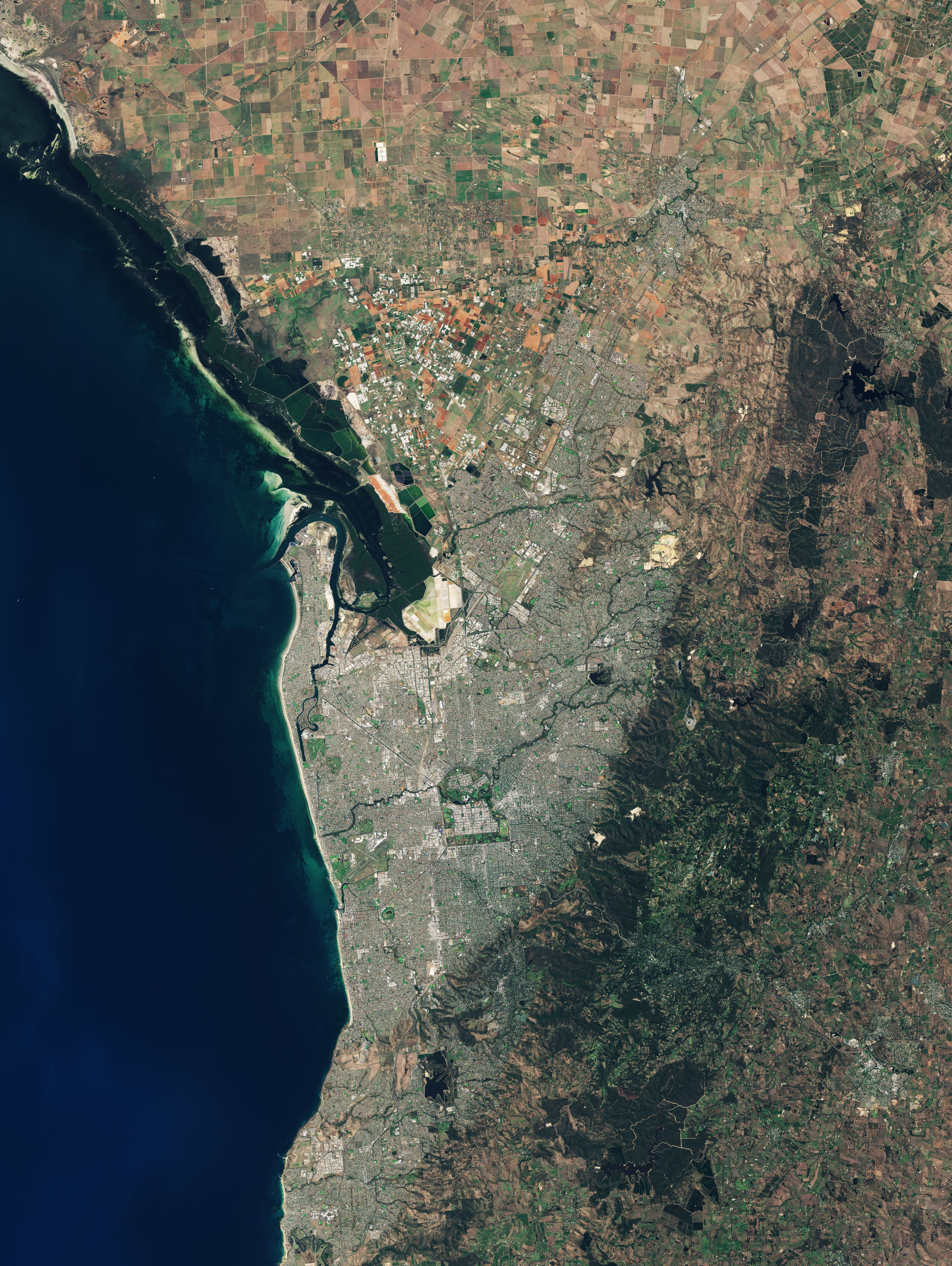
Adelaide's metropolitan area as seen by the ESA's Sentinel-2

Adelaide is north of the Fleurieu Peninsula, on the Adelaide Plains between the Gulf St Vincent and the relatively low-lying Mount Lofty Ranges (Mount Lofty, the highest point, is 710 metres above sea level). The city stretches 20 km (12 mi) from the coast to the foothills, and 90 km (56 mi) from Gawler at its northern extent to Sellicks Beach in the south. According to Regional Development Australia, an Australian government planning initiative, the "Adelaide Metropolitan Region" has a total land area of 870 km^{2} (340 sq mi), while a more expansive definition by the Australian Bureau of Statistics defines a "Greater Adelaide" statistical area totalling 3,259.8 km^{2} (1,258.6 sq mi). The city sits at an average elevation of 50 metres (160 ft) above sea level. Mount Lofty, east of the Adelaide metropolitan region in the Adelaide Hills at an elevation of 727 metres (2,385 ft), is the tallest point of the city and in the state south of Burra. The city borders the Temperate Grassland of South Australia in the east, an endangered vegetation community.

Much of Adelaide was bushland before British settlement, with some variation – sandhills, swamps and marshlands were prevalent around the coast. The loss of the sandhills to urban development had a particularly destructive effect on the coastline due to erosion. Where practical, the government has implemented programs to rebuild and vegetate sandhills at several of Adelaide's beachside suburbs. Tennyson Dunes is the largest contiguous, tertiary dune system contained entirely within Metropolitan Adelaide, providing refuge for a variety of remnant species formerly found along the entire coastline. Much of the original vegetation has been cleared with what is left to be found in reserves such as the Cleland National Park and Belair National Park. A number of creeks and rivers flow through the Adelaide region. The largest are the Torrens and Onkaparinga catchments. Adelaide relies on its many reservoirs for water supply with the Happy Valley Reservoir supplying around 40% and the much larger Mount Bold Reservoir 10% of Adelaide's domestic requirements respectively.

=== Geology ===
Adelaide and its surrounding area is one of the most seismically active regions in Australia. On 1 March 1954 at 3:40 am Adelaide experienced its largest recorded earthquake to date, with the epicentre 12 km from the city centre at Darlington, and a reported magnitude of 5.6. There have been smaller earthquakes in 2010, 2011, 2014, 2017, 2018 and 2022.

The uplands of the Adelaide Hills, part of the southern Mount Lofty Ranges to the east of Adelaide, are defined on their western side by a number of arcuate faults (the Para, Eden, Clarendon and Willunga Faults), and consist of rocks such as siltstone, dolomite and quartzite, dating from the Neoproterozoic to the middle Cambrian, laid down in the Adelaide Rift Complex, the oldest part of the Adelaide Superbasin.

Most of the Adelaide metropolitan area lies in the downthrown St Vincent Basin and its embayments, including the Adelaide Plains Sub-basin, and the Golden Grove, Noarlunga and Willunga Embayments. These basins contain deposits of Tertiary marine and non-marine sands and limestones, which form important aquifers. These deposits are overlain by Quaternary alluvial fans and piedmont slope deposits, derived from erosion of the uplands, consisting of sands, clays and gravels, interfingering to the west with transgressive Pleistocene to Holocene marine sands and coastal sediments of the shoreline of Gulf St Vincent.

=== Urban layout ===
Adelaide is a planned city, designed by the first Surveyor-General of South Australia, Colonel William Light. His plan, sometimes referred to as "Light's Vision" (also the name of a statue of him on Montefiore Hill), arranged Adelaide in a grid, with five squares in the Adelaide city centre and a ring of parks, known as the Adelaide Parklands, surrounding it. Light's selection of the location for the city was initially unpopular with the early settlers, as well as South Australia's first governor, John Hindmarsh, due to its distance from the harbour at Port Adelaide, and the lack of fresh water there.

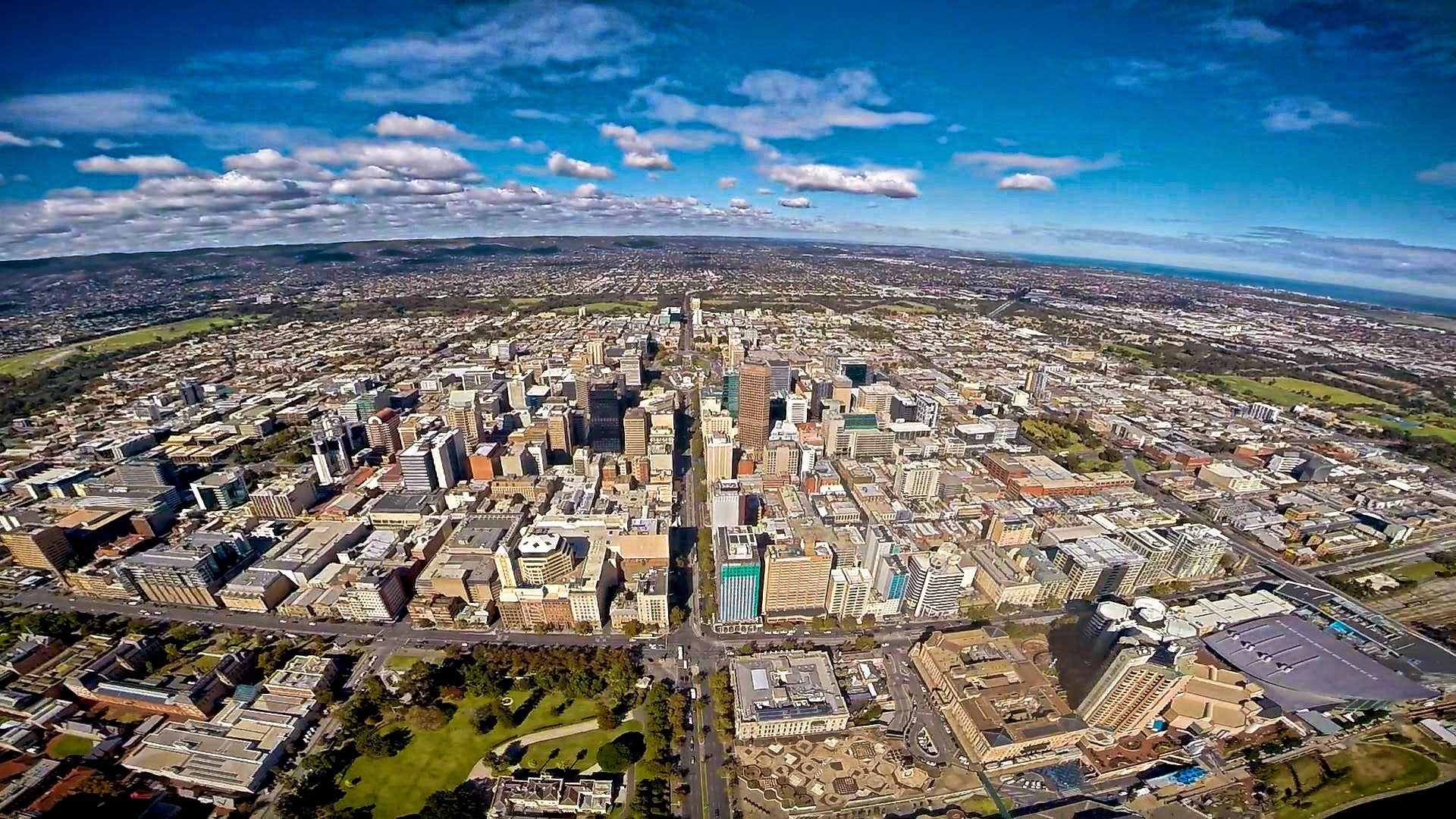
The city centre was built on a grid plan, known as "Light's Vision".

Light successfully persisted with his choice of location against this initial opposition. Recent evidence suggests that Light worked closely with George Kingston as well as a team of men to set out Adelaide, using various templates for city plans going back to Ancient Greece, including Italian Renaissance designs and the similar layouts of the American cities Philadelphia and Savannah–which, like Adelaide, follow the same layout of a central city square, four complementing city squares surrounding it and a parklands area that surrounds the city centre.

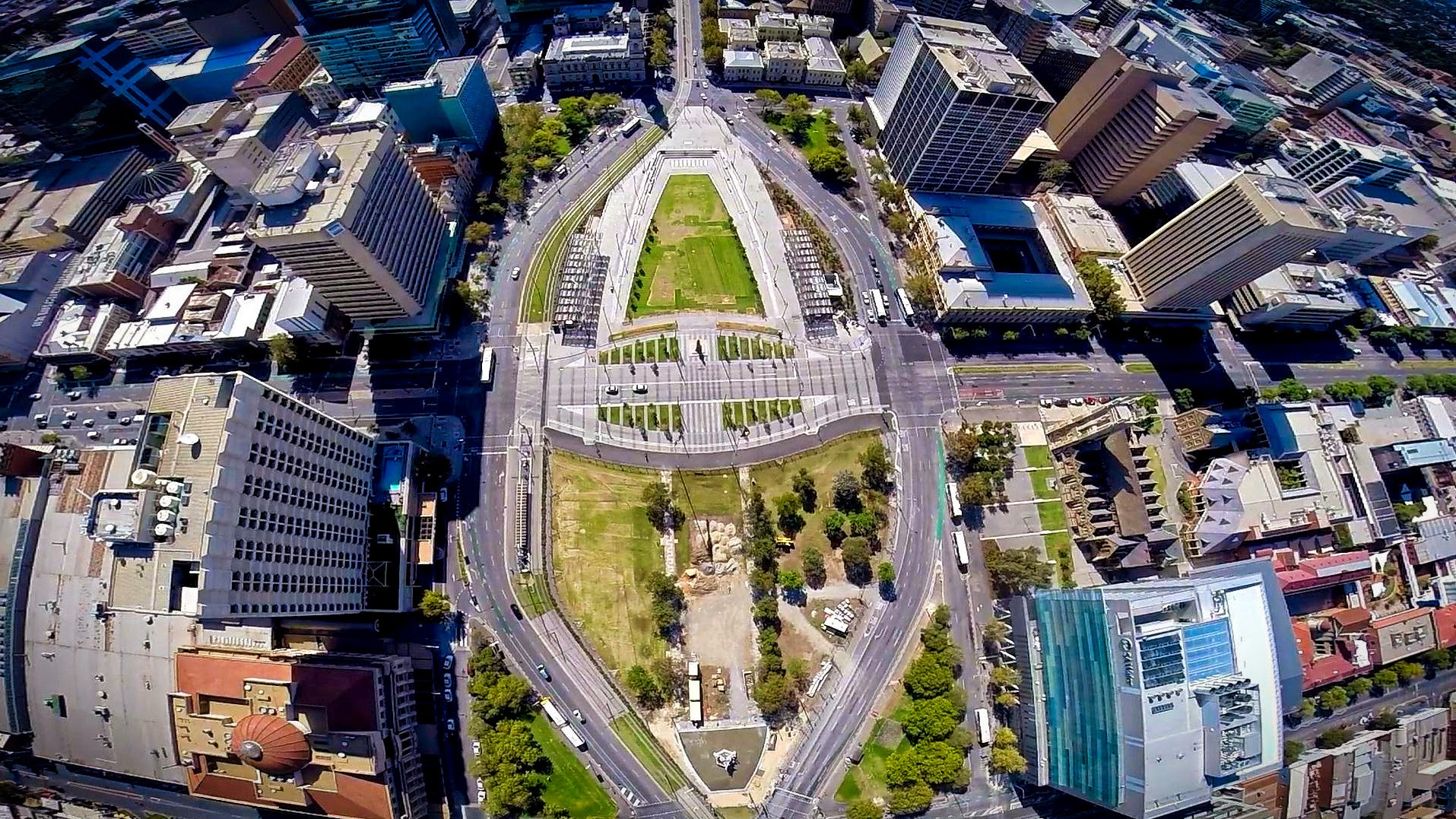
Aerial view of Victoria Square, one of the five main squares in the city centre and considered the heart of Adelaide's grid layout

The benefits of Light's design are numerous: Adelaide has had wide multi-lane roads from its beginning, an easily navigable cardinal direction grid layout and an expansive green ring around the city centre. There are two sets of ring roads in Adelaide that have resulted from the original design. The inner ring route (A21) borders the parklands, and the outer route (A3/A13/A16/A17) completely bypasses the inner city via (in clockwise order) Grand Junction Road, Hampstead Road, Ascot Avenue, Portrush Road, Cross Road and South Road.

Suburban expansion has to some extent outgrown Light's original plan. Numerous former outlying villages and "country towns", as well as the satellite city of Elizabeth, have been enveloped by its suburban sprawl. Expanding developments in the Adelaide Hills region led to the construction of the South Eastern Freeway to cope with growth, which has subsequently led to new developments and further improvements to that transport corridor. Similarly, the booming development in Adelaide's South led to the construction of the Southern Expressway.

New roads are not the only transport infrastructure developed to cope with the urban growth. The O-Bahn Busway and Adelaide Metro are examples of a unique solution to Tea Tree Gully's transport woes in the 1980s. The development of the nearby suburb of Golden Grove in the late 1980s followed a planned approach to urban growth.

In the 1960s, a Metropolitan Adelaide Transport Study Plan was proposed to cater for the future growth of the city. The plan involved the construction of freeways, expressways and the upgrade of certain aspects of the public transport system. The then premier Steele Hall approved many parts of the plan and the government went as far as purchasing land for the project. The later Labor government elected under Don Dunstan shelved the plan, but allowed the purchased land to remain vacant, should the future need for freeways arise. In 1980, the Liberal party won government and premier David Tonkin committed his government to selling off the land acquired for the MATS plan, ensuring that even when needs changed, the construction of most MATS-proposed freeways would be impractical. Some parts of this land have been used for transport, (e.g. the O-Bahn Busway and Southern Expressway), while most has been progressively subdivided for residential use.

In 2008, the SA Government announced plans for a network of transport-oriented developments across the Adelaide metropolitan area and purchased a 10 hectare industrial site at Bowden for $52.5 million as the first of these developments.

=== Architecture ===
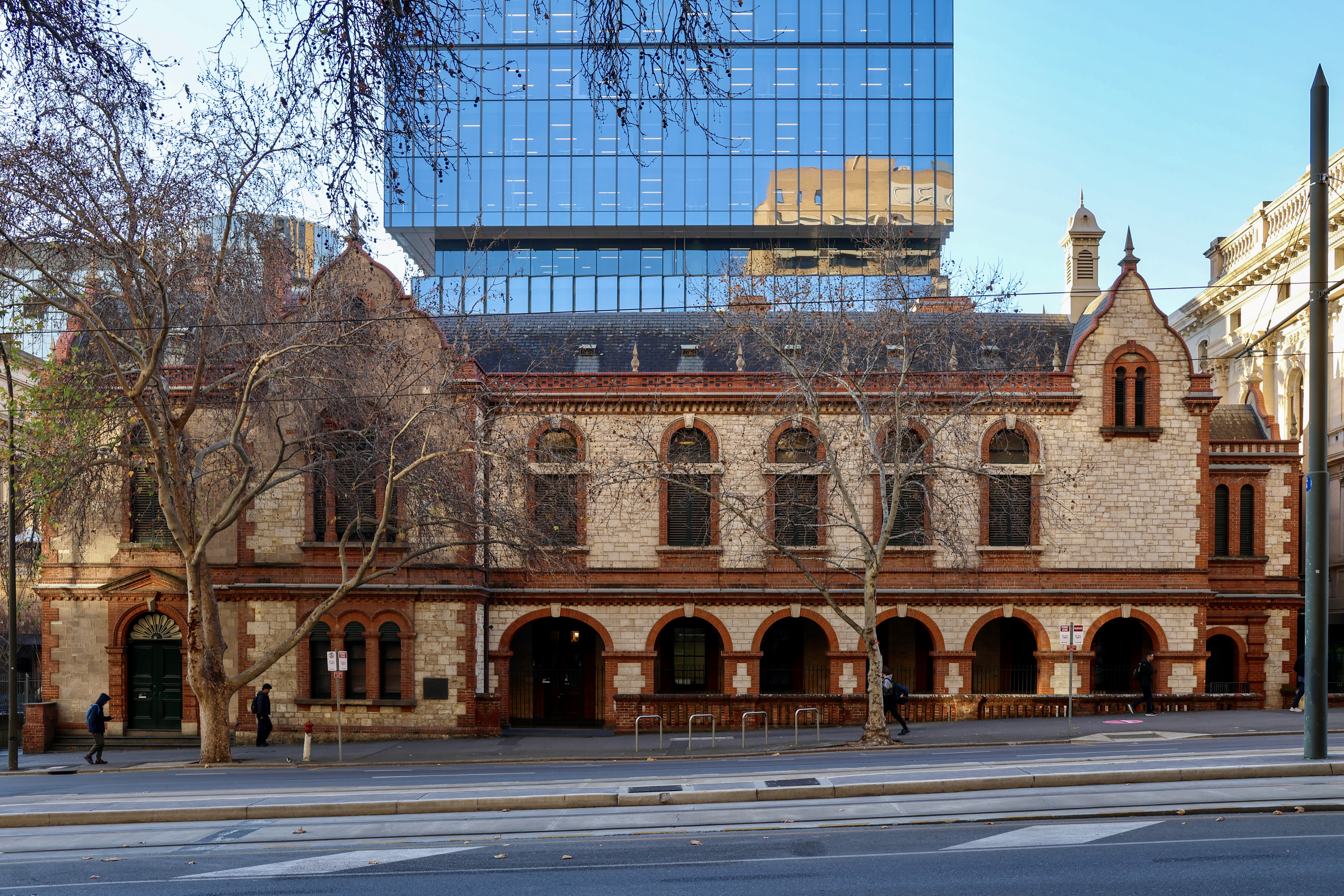
Old Parliament House (1856)

Adelaide's early architecture is distinctive and recognisable due to South Australia's availability of local stone during the earlier years of settlement. As a result, a significant number of city buildings were constructed using bluestone. North Terrace, the cultural precinct of the city–features cultural institutions such as libraries, museums and universities–established or erected when Adelaide was still Australia's third largest city. The South Australian Museum (1856) is a Gothic-inspired Victorian building evoking much of the strictures laid down by John Ruskin, an English philosopher and art critic. It was built to complement the adjoining wing of the State Library of South Australia (1844), and features a mansard roof with an octagonal tower built in the French Renaissance style.

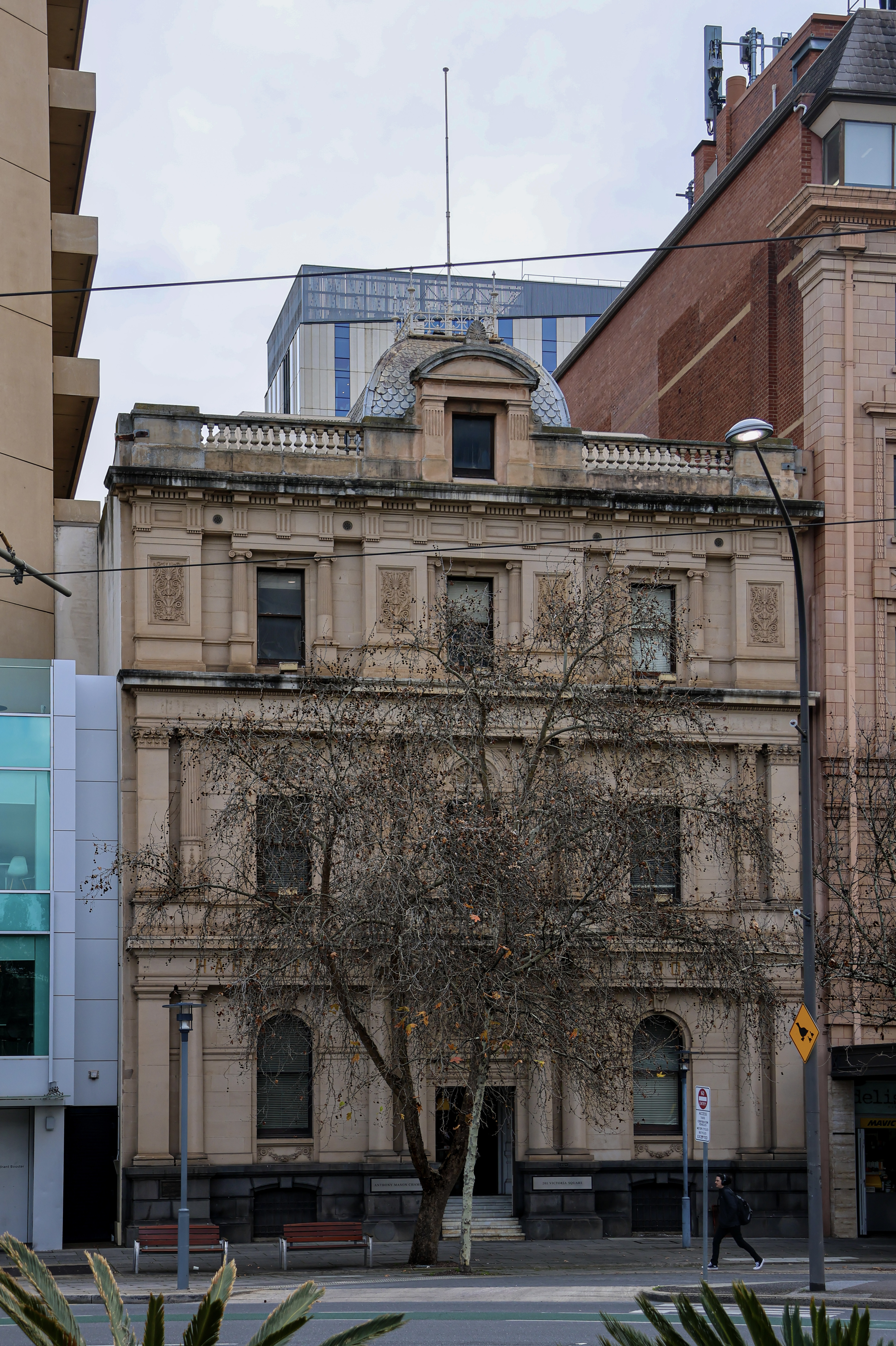
The heritage-listed Harbours Board Building in Victoria Square is an example of façadism in Adelaide. The interior was gutted in 1979 but the exterior was preserved.

Adelaide features an abundance of churches dotted across the city, giving it the moniker the "City of Churches". The first church constructed in South Australia, the Holy Trinity Church on North Terrace, was built in 1838 and enlarged in the 1840s. It features a tower clock, made by Vulliamy, clockmaker to King William IV, after whose consort the city of Adelaide was named. Perhaps the most elaborate and grand examples of an Adelaide church is the St Peter's Cathedral (1869), dominating King William Street and designed by English architect William Butterfield, who also designed Melbourne's St Paul's Cathedral. The Gothic Revival St Peter's Cathedral, with its soaring spires, rich fenestration and massive lantern, features columned aisles and stained glass interiors. It is situated on approximately 1 acre (0.40 ha) of land at the corner of Pennington Terrace King William Road in North Adelaide.

The Old (1856) and New Parliament House of Adelaide (1889) are situated at the intersection of North Terrace and King William Road, on the corner. The Old Parliament House, built on the present site between 1856 and 1857, through the contractor I. W. Perryman. Additional extensions and renovations were undertaken in the subsequent decades, which included construction works carried out by architect Edward Woods in 1875–1876, aimed at enlarging the House of Assembly Chamber and creating more offices. Following the erection of the west wing of the new Parliament House in 1889, all the activities of the parliament gradually moved to the new building, except for the Legislative Council, which stayed in the old building until 1939. Much like Melbourne's Parliament House, a dome and elaborate towers were put forth in the proposal of the new Parliament, but due to funding constraints, were never built.

==== Housing ====
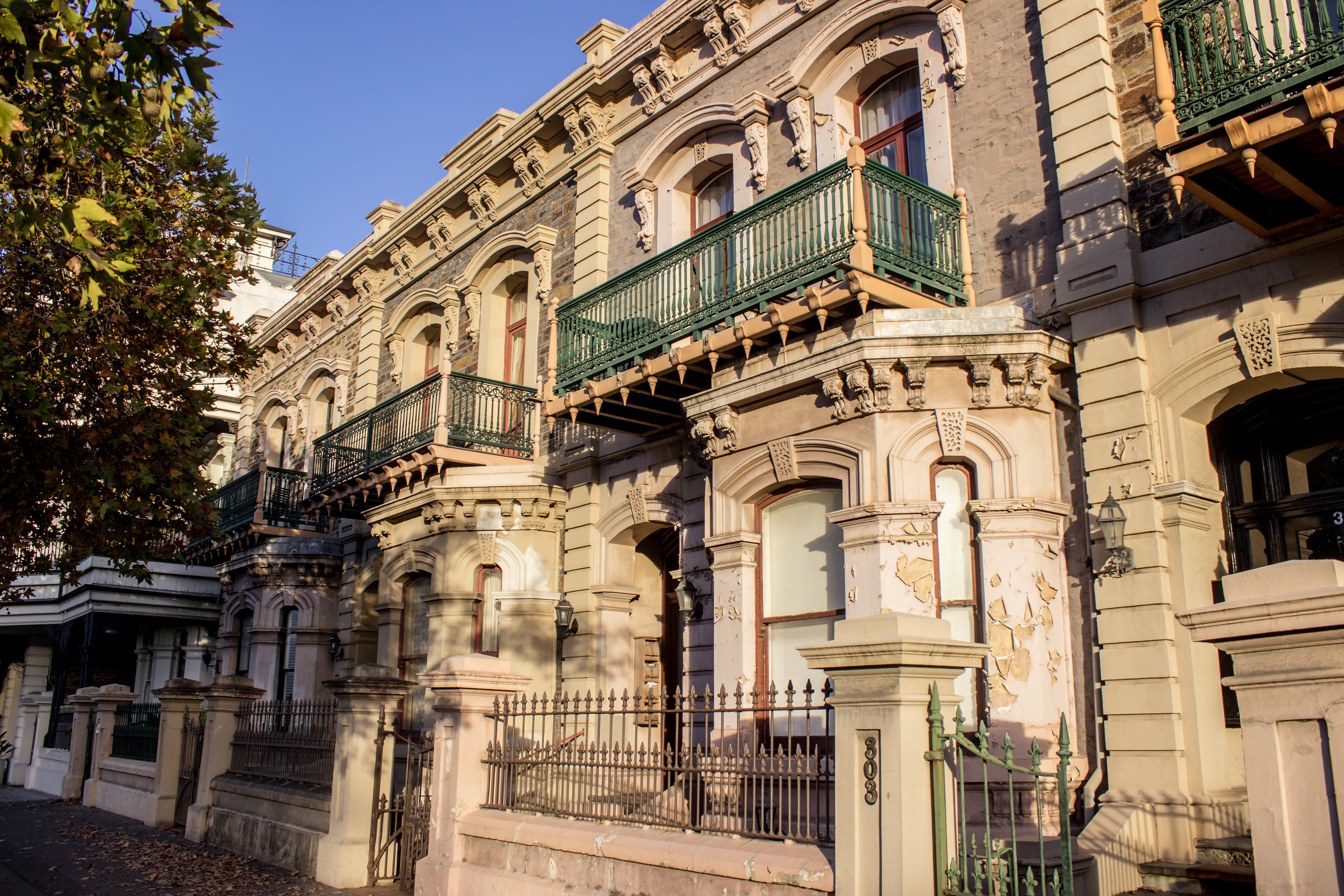
Terraced housing on North Terrace

Historically, Adelaide's suburban residential areas have been characterised by single-storey detached houses built on 1,000-square-metre (1/4-acre) blocks. A relative lack of suitable, locally available timber for construction purposes led to the early development of a brick-making industry, as well as the use of stone, for houses and other buildings. By 1891, 68% of houses were built of stone, 15% of timber, and 10% of brick, with brick also being widely used in stone houses for quoins, door and window surrounds, and chimneys and fireplaces.

There is a wide variety in the styles of these houses. Until the 1960s, most of the more substantial houses were built of red brick, though many front walls were of ornamental stone. Then cream bricks became fashionable, and in the 1970s, deep red and brown bricks became popular. Until the 1970s, roofs tended to be clad with (painted) corrugated iron or cement or clay tiles, usually red "terracotta". Since then, Colorbond corrugated steel has dominated. Most roofs are pitched. Flat roofs are not common.

Up to the 1970s, most houses were of "double brick" construction on concrete footings, with timber floors laid on joists supported by "dwarf walls". Later houses have mainly been of "brick veneer" construction – structural timber or, more recently, lightweight steel frame on a concrete slab foundation, lined with Gyprock, and with an outer skin of brickwork, to cope with Adelaide's reactive soils, particularly Keswick Clay, black earth and some red-brown earth soils. The use of precast concrete panels for floor and wall construction has also increased. In addition to this, a significant factor in Adelaide's suburban history is the role of the South Australian Housing Trust.

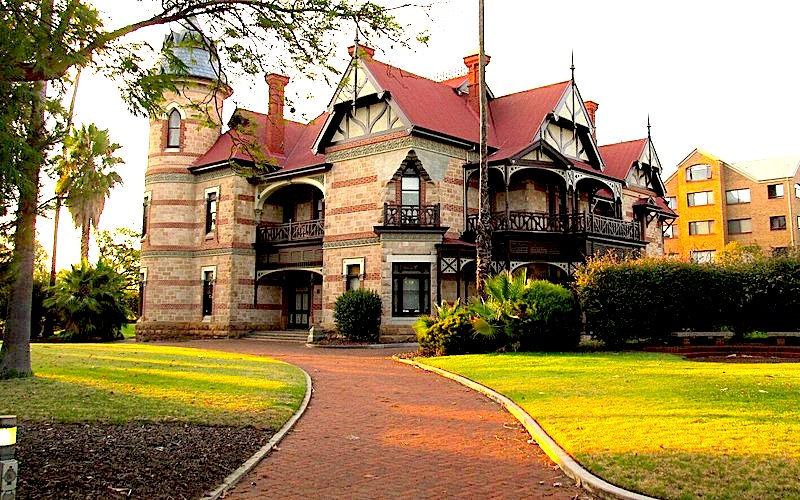
Carclew House

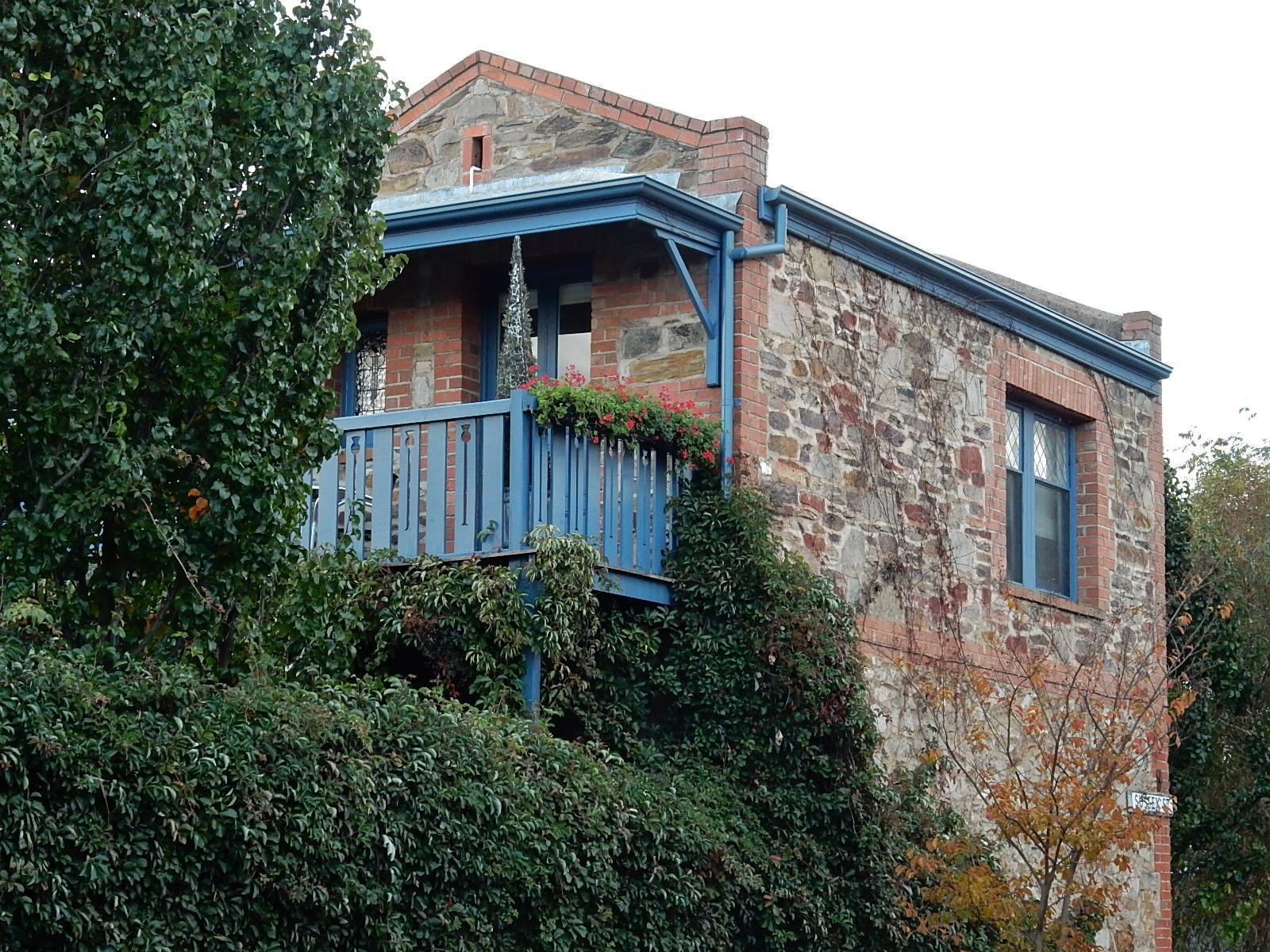
Two-storey house in North Adelaide. Much of Adelaide's early housing was built with bluestone.

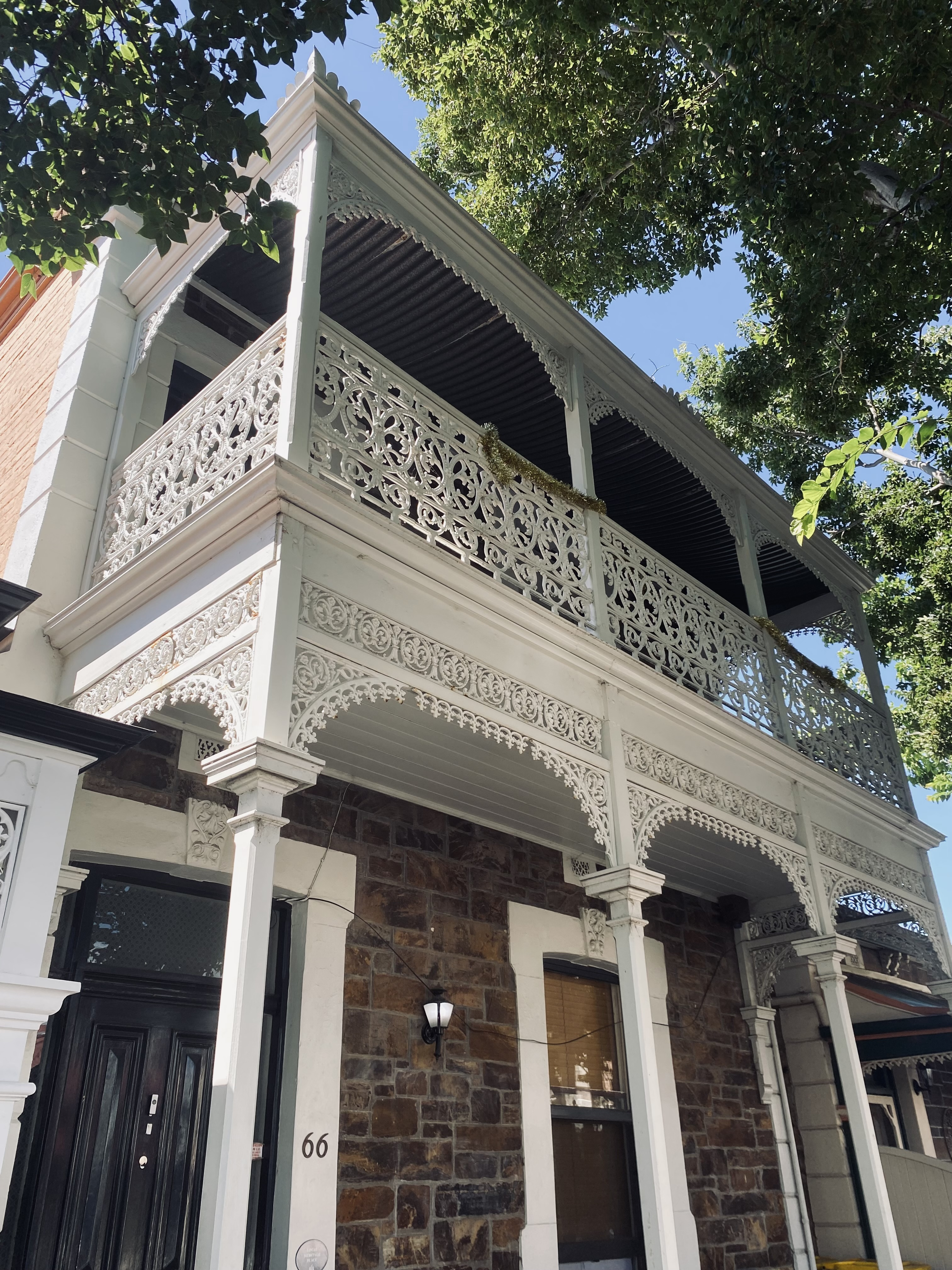
Heritage-listed bluestone 19th-century house in the city centre

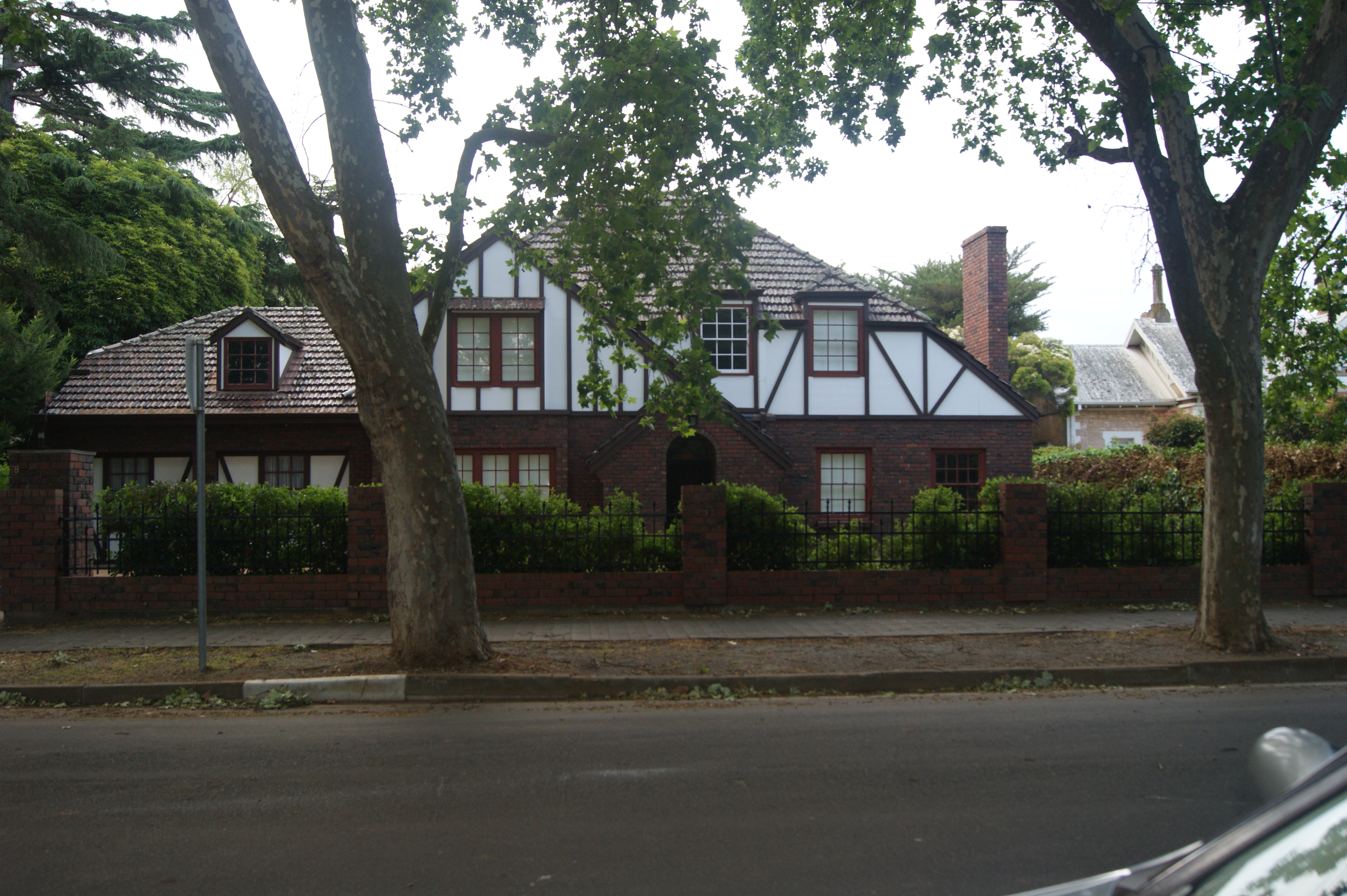
Tudor Revival house in Unley Park

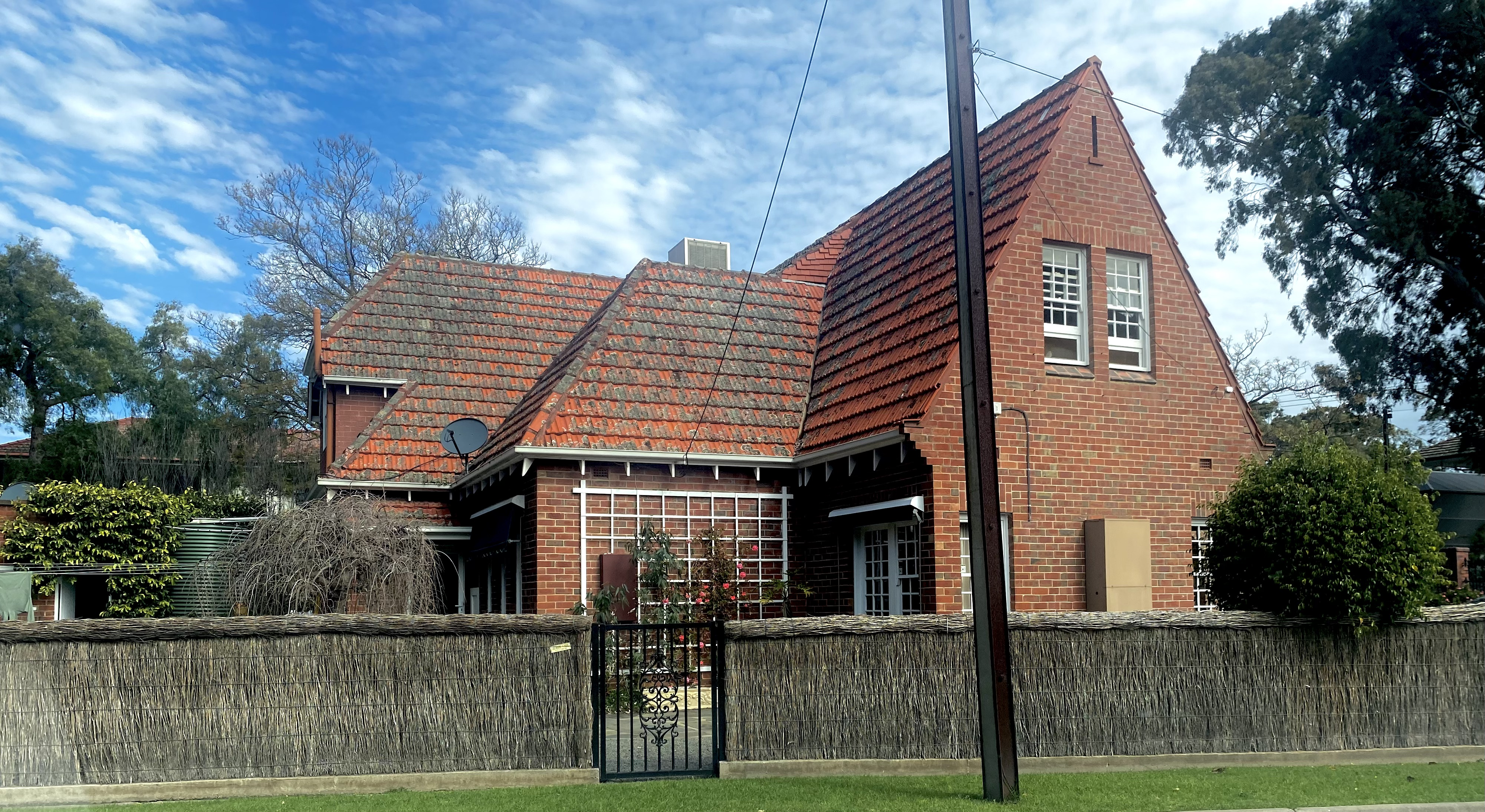
House in Lockleys with two distinguishing features that characterise Adelaide houses: a brush fence and red brick veneer.

=== Climate ===
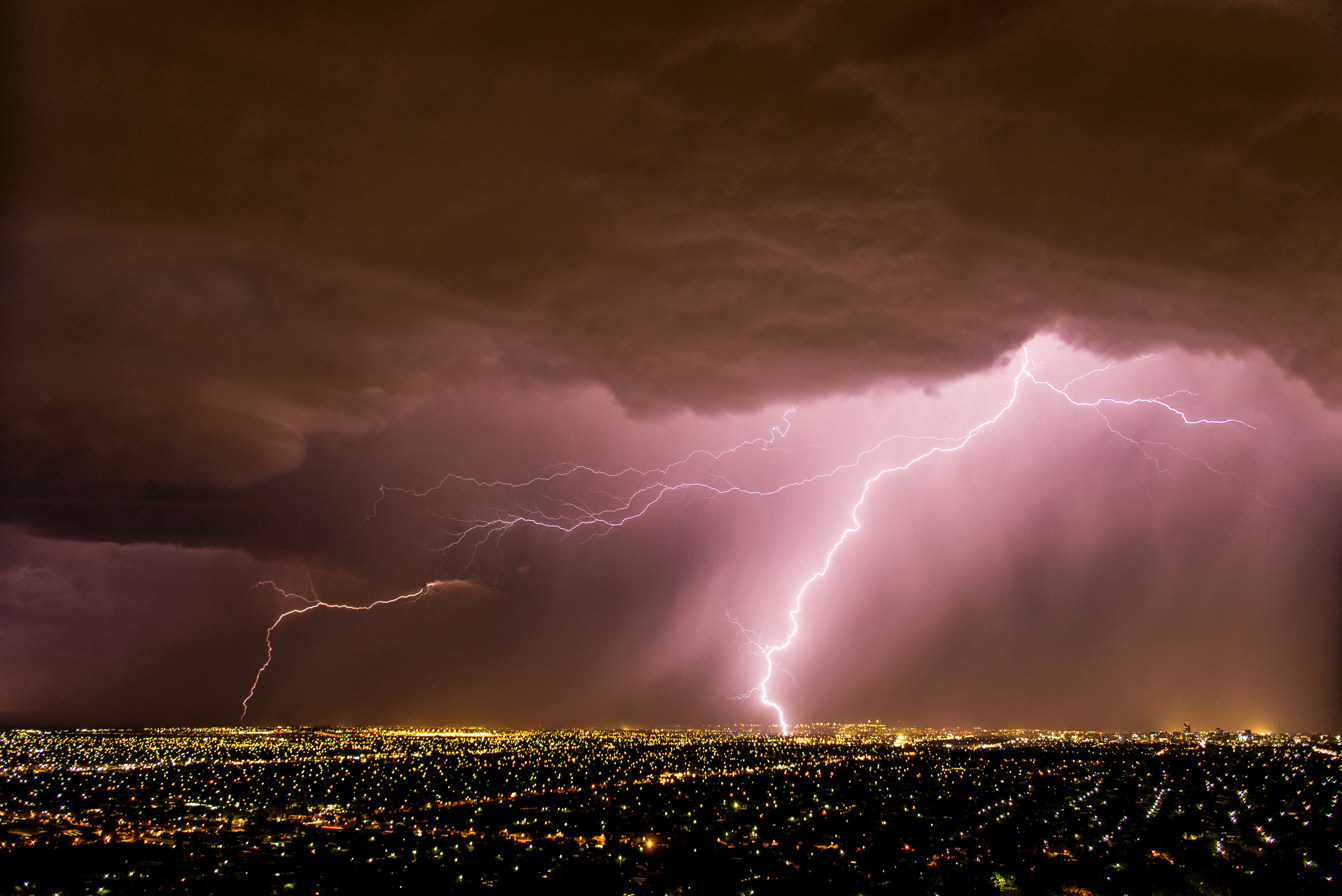
A spring storm over Adelaide

Adelaide has a hot-summer Mediterranean climate (Csa) under the Köppen climate classification. The city has hot, dry summers and cool winters with moderate rainfall. Most rain falls in the winter months, leading to the suggestion that the climate be classified as a "cold monsoon". Rainfall is unreliable, light and infrequent throughout summer, although heavy falls can occur. The winter has fairly reliable rainfall with June being the wettest month of the year, averaging around 80 mm. Frosts are occasional, with the most notable occurrences in 1908 and 1982. Hail may occur in winter.

Adelaide is a windy city with significant wind chill in winter, which makes the temperature seem colder than it actually is. Snowfall in the metropolitan area is extremely rare, although light and sporadic falls in the nearby hills and at Mount Lofty occur during winter. Dewpoints in the summer typically range from 8 to 10 °C (46 to 50 °F). There are usually several days in summer where the temperature reaches 40.0 °C (104.0 °F) or above.

Temperature extremes range from −2.6 °C (31.4 °F), 8 June 1982 to 47.7 °C (117.9 °F), 24 January 2019. The city features 90.6 clear days annually. The average sea temperature ranges from 13.7 °C (56.7 °F) in August to 21.2 °C (70.2 °F) in February.

Climate data for Adelaide Airport M.O. (7 km (4.3 mi) W of Adelaide, 2 m (6.6 ft) ASL, 1991–2020 averages, 1887–2025 extremes (Note: Temperature extremes are taken additionally from Adelaide (West Terrace) - site no. 023000))
Month	Jan	Feb	Mar	Apr	May	Jun	Jul	Aug	Sep	Oct	Nov	Dec	Year
Record high °C (°F)	46.6 (115.9)	43.6 (110.5)	41.8 (107.2)	36.9 (98.4)	32.3 (90.1)	26.1 (79.0)	25.9 (78.6)	29.9 (85.8)	35.1 (95.2)	38.9 (102.0)	43.1 (109.6)	45.3 (113.5)	46.6 (115.9)
Mean daily maximum °C (°F)	28.6 (83.5)	28.4 (83.1)	25.6 (78.1)	22.5 (72.5)	18.7 (65.7)	16.0 (60.8)	15.2 (59.4)	16.1 (61.0)	18.7 (65.7)	21.7 (71.1)	24.5 (76.1)	26.4 (79.5)	21.9 (71.4)
Daily mean °C (°F)	22.7 (72.9)	22.6 (72.7)	20.2 (68.4)	17.3 (63.1)	14.3 (57.7)	12.0 (53.6)	11.3 (52.3)	11.9 (53.4)	14.1 (57.4)	16.4 (61.5)	19.1 (66.4)	20.8 (69.4)	16.9 (62.4)
Mean daily minimum °C (°F)	16.8 (62.2)	16.8 (62.2)	14.8 (58.6)	12.1 (53.8)	9.9 (49.8)	8.0 (46.4)	7.4 (45.3)	7.7 (45.9)	9.4 (48.9)	11.1 (52.0)	13.6 (56.5)	15.2 (59.4)	11.9 (53.4)
Record low °C (°F)	7.9 (46.2)	7.8 (46.0)	4.6 (40.3)	3.1 (37.6)	−0.3 (31.5)	−2.6 (27.3)	−1.1 (30.0)	−0.3 (31.5)	1.1 (34.0)	3.1 (37.6)	4.2 (39.6)	5.9 (42.6)	−2.6 (27.3)
Average rainfall mm (inches)	21.2 (0.83)	20.0 (0.79)	24.9 (0.98)	37.6 (1.48)	59.3 (2.33)	77.7 (3.06)	71.1 (2.80)	66.9 (2.63)	59.6 (2.35)	40.0 (1.57)	31.0 (1.22)	28.3 (1.11)	536.5 (21.12)
Average rainy days (≥ 0.2 mm)	4.7	3.7	5.9	8.2	12.7	14.6	16.3	16.2	13.5	9.9	8.3	7.2	121.2
Average afternoon relative humidity (%)	36	36	41	47	55	61	60	55	51	45	40	39	47
Mean monthly sunshine hours	325.5	285.3	266.6	219.0	167.4	135.0	145.7	189.1	204.0	257.3	273.0	294.5	2,762.4
Percentage possible sunshine	74	75	71	65	53	45	48	54	55	64	65	67	61
Source 1: Adelaide Airport M.O. (averages 1991–2020, extremes 1955–2025)
Source 2: Adelaide (Kent Town, rainfall 1991–2020, extremes 1977–2025)

Climate data for Adelaide (Kent Town) (1991–2020 averages, extremes 1977–2020)
Month	Jan	Feb	Mar	Apr	May	Jun	Jul	Aug	Sep	Oct	Nov	Dec	Year
Record high °C (°F)	47.7 (117.9)	44.7 (112.5)	42.2 (108.0)	36.9 (98.4)	31.1 (88.0)	25.4 (77.7)	23.1 (73.6)	30.4 (86.7)	34.3 (93.7)	39.0 (102.2)	43.0 (109.4)	45.2 (113.4)	47.7 (117.9)
Mean maximum °C (°F)	41.5 (106.7)	39.7 (103.5)	36.9 (98.4)	31.5 (88.7)	25.7 (78.3)	20.8 (69.4)	20.2 (68.4)	23.3 (73.9)	28.4 (83.1)	33.3 (91.9)	37.1 (98.8)	39.1 (102.4)	42.4 (108.3)
Mean daily maximum °C (°F)	30.0 (86.0)	29.7 (85.5)	26.6 (79.9)	23.0 (73.4)	19.0 (66.2)	16.2 (61.2)	15.6 (60.1)	16.7 (62.1)	19.3 (66.7)	22.5 (72.5)	25.4 (77.7)	27.6 (81.7)	22.6 (72.7)
Daily mean °C (°F)	23.8 (74.8)	23.6 (74.5)	21.0 (69.8)	17.9 (64.2)	14.6 (58.3)	12.3 (54.1)	11.7 (53.1)	12.4 (54.3)	14.6 (58.3)	17.1 (62.8)	19.8 (67.6)	21.7 (71.1)	17.5 (63.5)
Mean daily minimum °C (°F)	17.6 (63.7)	17.5 (63.5)	15.3 (59.5)	12.7 (54.9)	10.2 (50.4)	8.3 (46.9)	7.7 (45.9)	8.1 (46.6)	9.9 (49.8)	11.7 (53.1)	14.1 (57.4)	15.8 (60.4)	12.4 (54.3)
Mean minimum °C (°F)	12.0 (53.6)	11.8 (53.2)	9.8 (49.6)	7.5 (45.5)	5.0 (41.0)	2.9 (37.2)	2.6 (36.7)	3.1 (37.6)	4.7 (40.5)	6.2 (43.2)	8.0 (46.4)	9.9 (49.8)	2.0 (35.6)
Record low °C (°F)	9.2 (48.6)	9.5 (49.1)	7.2 (45.0)	4.3 (39.7)	1.5 (34.7)	−0.4 (31.3)	0.4 (32.7)	0.9 (33.6)	2.6 (36.7)	4.7 (40.5)	5.3 (41.5)	7.9 (46.2)	−0.4 (31.3)
Average rainfall mm (inches)	21.2 (0.83)	20.0 (0.79)	24.9 (0.98)	37.6 (1.48)	59.3 (2.33)	78.2 (3.08)	71.1 (2.80)	66.9 (2.63)	59.6 (2.35)	40.0 (1.57)	31.0 (1.22)	28.3 (1.11)	535.9 (21.10)
Average rainy days (≥ 1.0 mm)	3.1	2.3	3.5	5.2	8.7	10.5	11.9	11.5	9.2	6.0	4.8	4.4	81.1
Average afternoon relative humidity (%)	36	36	40	45	55	61	59	54	50	44	40	38	46
Mean monthly sunshine hours	325.5	285.3	266.6	219.0	167.4	135.0	145.7	189.1	204.0	257.3	273.0	294.5	2,762.4
Percentage possible sunshine	74	75	71	65	53	45	48	54	55	64	65	67	61
Source: Bureau of Meteorology.

Climate data for Parafield Airport (15 km (9.3 mi) N of Adelaide, 10 m (33 ft) ASL, 1991−2020 averages, 1939−2024 extremes)
Month	Jan	Feb	Mar	Apr	May	Jun	Jul	Aug	Sep	Oct	Nov	Dec	Year
Record high °C (°F)	47.7 (117.9)	44.7 (112.5)	42.7 (108.9)	38.2 (100.8)	31.1 (88.0)	26.3 (79.3)	26.5 (79.7)	30.4 (86.7)	35.0 (95.0)	39.2 (102.6)	44.3 (111.7)	46.7 (116.1)	47.7 (117.9)
Mean daily maximum °C (°F)	30.9 (87.6)	30.6 (87.1)	27.4 (81.3)	23.7 (74.7)	19.3 (66.7)	16.2 (61.2)	15.6 (60.1)	16.7 (62.1)	19.6 (67.3)	23.2 (73.8)	26.6 (79.9)	28.6 (83.5)	23.2 (73.8)
Daily mean °C (°F)	23.8 (74.8)	23.7 (74.7)	20.9 (69.6)	17.6 (63.7)	14.2 (57.6)	11.5 (52.7)	10.9 (51.6)	11.6 (52.9)	13.9 (57.0)	16.8 (62.2)	19.9 (67.8)	21.8 (71.2)	17.2 (63.0)
Mean daily minimum °C (°F)	16.7 (62.1)	16.7 (62.1)	14.3 (57.7)	11.5 (52.7)	9.0 (48.2)	6.8 (44.2)	6.2 (43.2)	6.4 (43.5)	8.2 (46.8)	10.3 (50.5)	13.1 (55.6)	14.9 (58.8)	11.2 (52.1)
Record low °C (°F)	7.6 (45.7)	5.0 (41.0)	5.9 (42.6)	0.6 (33.1)	−1.4 (29.5)	−2.4 (27.7)	−2.8 (27.0)	−2.0 (28.4)	−0.2 (31.6)	1.4 (34.5)	2.5 (36.5)	5.6 (42.1)	−2.8 (27.0)
Average rainfall mm (inches)	19.7 (0.78)	18.4 (0.72)	22.4 (0.88)	33.2 (1.31)	46.9 (1.85)	54.2 (2.13)	55.6 (2.19)	50.7 (2.00)	46.6 (1.83)	31.8 (1.25)	23.0 (0.91)	22.6 (0.89)	425.1 (16.74)
Average rainy days	4.3	3.5	5.3	7.9	11.5	12.9	15.4	14.6	12.8	8.5	6.9	5.8	109.4

=== Liveability ===
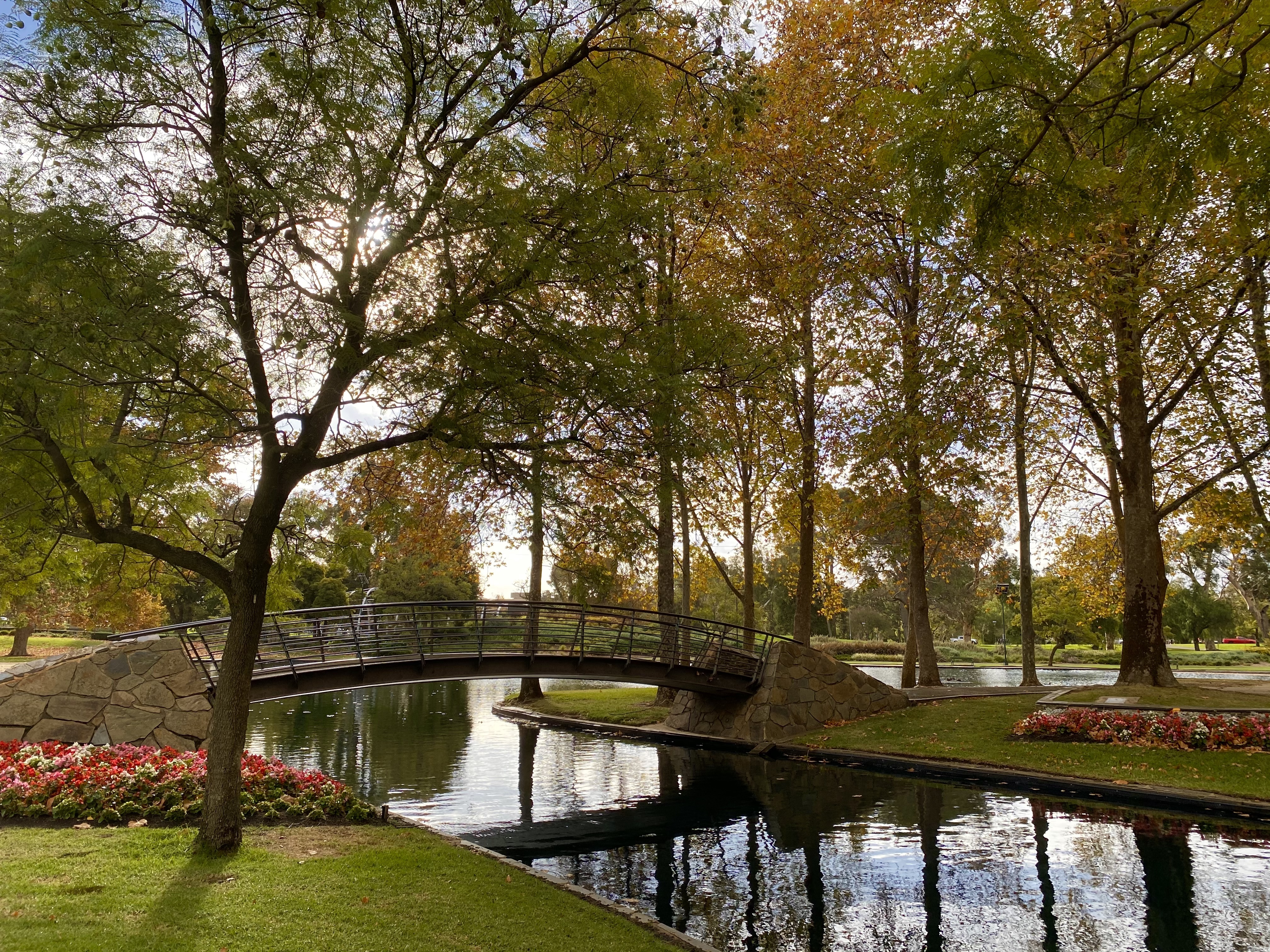
Rymill Park in autumn

Adelaide was consistently ranked in the world's 10 most liveable cities through the 2010s by The Economist Intelligence Unit. In June 2021, The Economist ranked Adelaide the third most liveable city in the world, behind Auckland and Osaka. In June 2023, Adelaide was ranked the twelfth most liveable city in the world by the Economist Intelligence Unit.

In December 2021, Adelaide was named the world's second National Park City, after the state government had lobbied for this title.

It was ranked the most liveable city in Australia by the Property Council of Australia, based on surveys of residents' views of their own city, between 2010 and 2013, dropping to second place in 2014.

== Governance ==
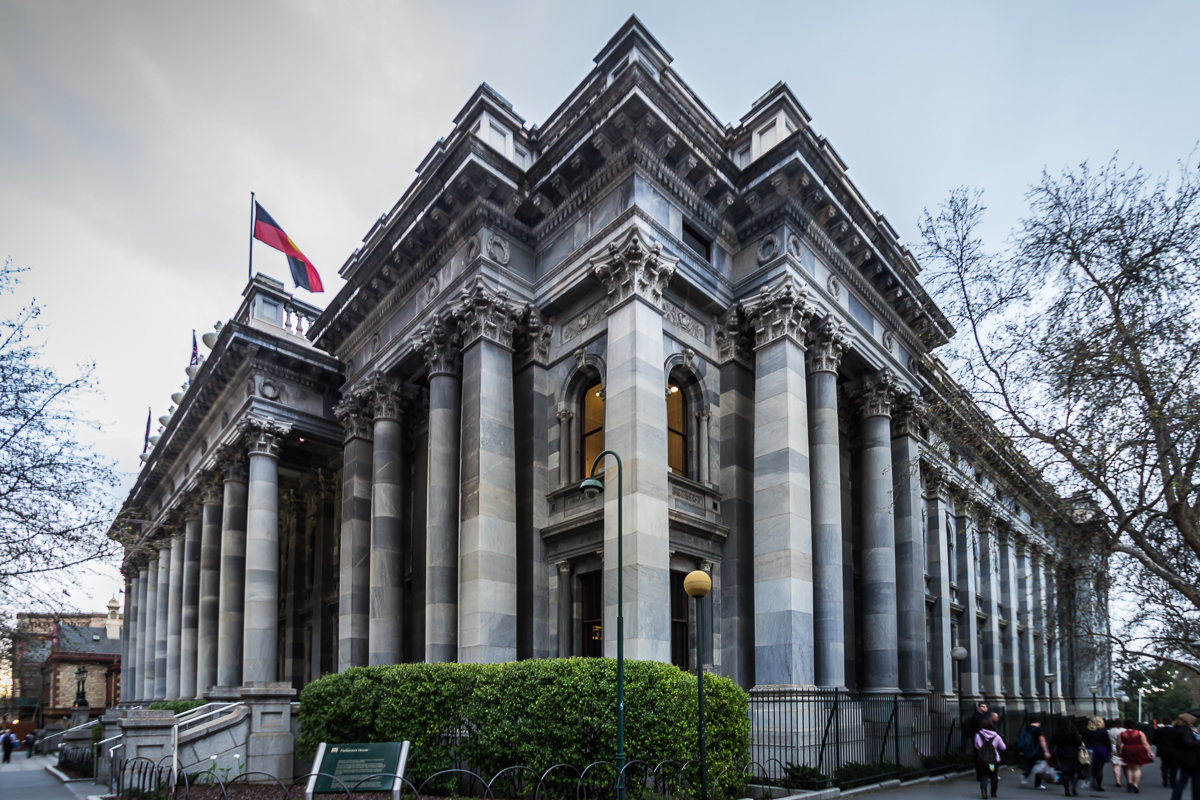
Parliament House, Adelaide

Adelaide, as the capital of South Australia, is the seat of the Government of South Australia. The bicameral Parliament of South Australia consists of the lower house known as the House of Assembly and the upper house known as the Legislative Council. General elections are held every four years, the last being the 2022 South Australian state election.

As Adelaide is South Australia's capital and most populous city, the State Government co-operates extensively with the City of Adelaide. In 2006, the Ministry for the City of Adelaide was created to facilitate the State Government's collaboration with the Adelaide City Council and the Lord Mayor to improve Adelaide's image. The State Parliament's Capital City Committee is also involved in the governance of the City of Adelaide, being primarily concerned with the planning of Adelaide's urban development and growth.

Reflecting South Australia's status as Australia's most centralised state, Adelaide elects a substantial majority of the South Australian House of Assembly. Of the 47 seats in the chamber, 34 seats (three-quarters of the legislature) are based in Adelaide, and two rural seats include Adelaide suburbs.

=== Local governments ===
The Adelaide metropolitan area is divided between nineteen local government areas. At its centre, the City of Adelaide administers the Adelaide city centre, North Adelaide, and the surrounding Adelaide Parklands. It is the oldest municipal authority in Australia and was established in 1840, when Adelaide and Australia's first mayor, James Hurtle Fisher, was elected. From 1919 onwards, the city has had a Lord Mayor, the current being Lord Mayor The Right Honourable Jane Lomax-Smith.

== Demography ==
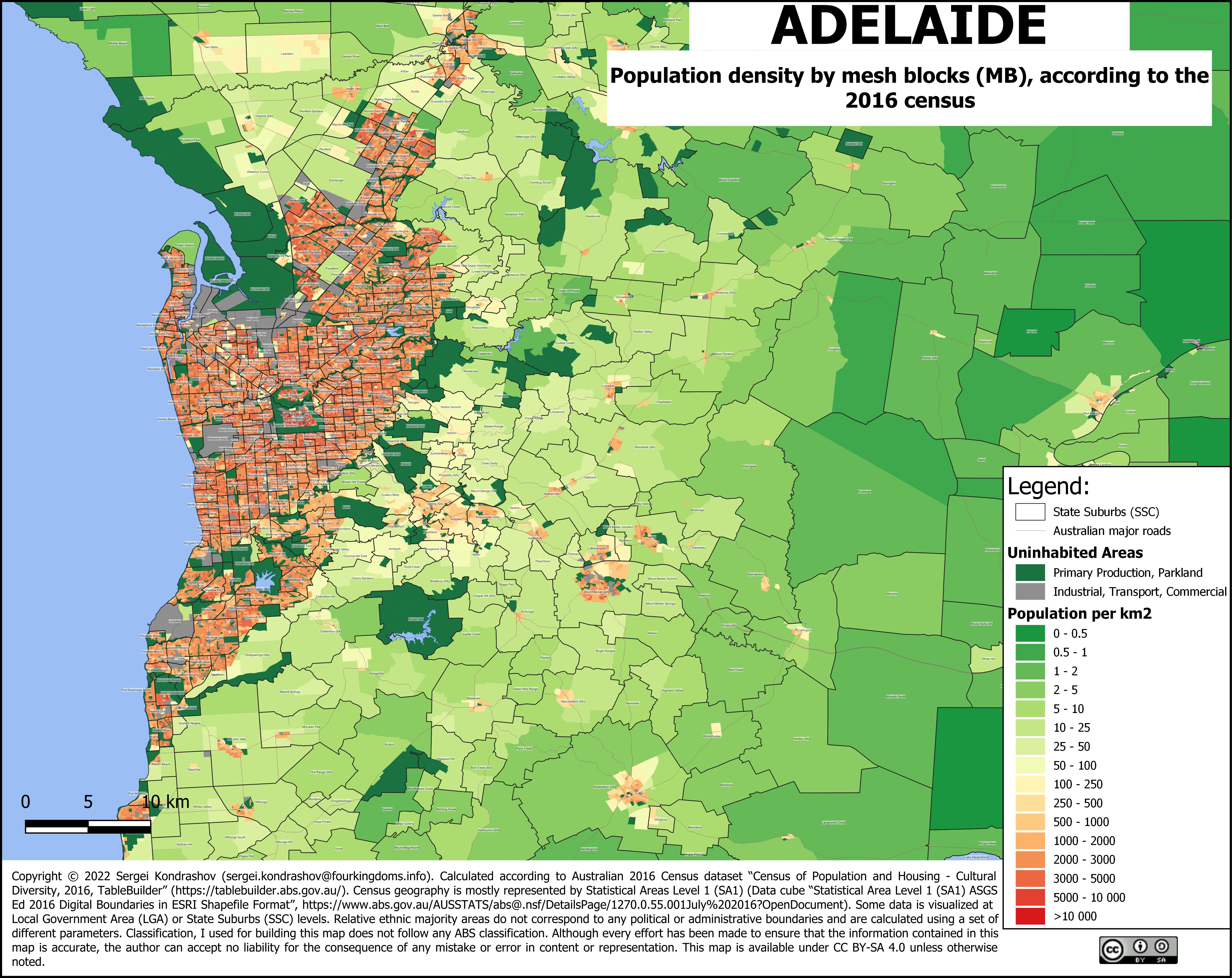
Adelaide's population density by mesh blocks (MB), 2016 census

Adelaide's inhabitants are known as Adelaideans.

Compared with Australia's other state capitals, Adelaide is growing at a rate similar to Sydney and Hobart (see List of cities in Australia by population). In 2024, it had a metropolitan population (including suburbs) of 1,469,163, making it Australia's fifth-largest city. 77% of the population of South Australia are residents of the Adelaide metropolitan area, making South Australia one of the most centralised states.

Major areas of population growth in recent years have been in outer suburbs such as Mawson Lakes and Golden Grove. Adelaide's inhabitants occupy 366,912 houses, 57,695 semi-detached, row terrace or town houses and 49,413 flats, units or apartments.

About one sixth (17.1%) of the population had university qualifications. The number of Adelaideans with vocational qualifications (such as tradespersons) fell from 62.1% of the labour force in the 1991 census to 52.4% in the 2001 census.

Adelaide is aging more rapidly than other Australian capital cities. More than a quarter (27.5%) of Adelaide's population is aged 55 years or older, in comparison to the national average of 25.6%. Adelaide has the lowest number of children (under-15-year-olds), who comprised 17.7% of the population, compared to the national average of 19.3%.

=== Ancestry and immigration ===
Country of Birth (2021)
Birthplace (Note: In accordance with the Australian Bureau of Statistics source, England, Scotland, Mainland China and the Special Administrative Regions of Hong Kong and Macau are listed separately)	Population
Australia	953,200
England	78,486
India	42,933
Mainland China	24,921
Vietnam	16,564
Italy	15,667
Philippines	12,826
New Zealand	10,238
Scotland	9,381
Malaysia	8,509
Afghanistan	7,909
Germany	7,680
Greece	7,590
Nepal	7,055
South Africa	6,983
Pakistan	5,432
Iran	5,147

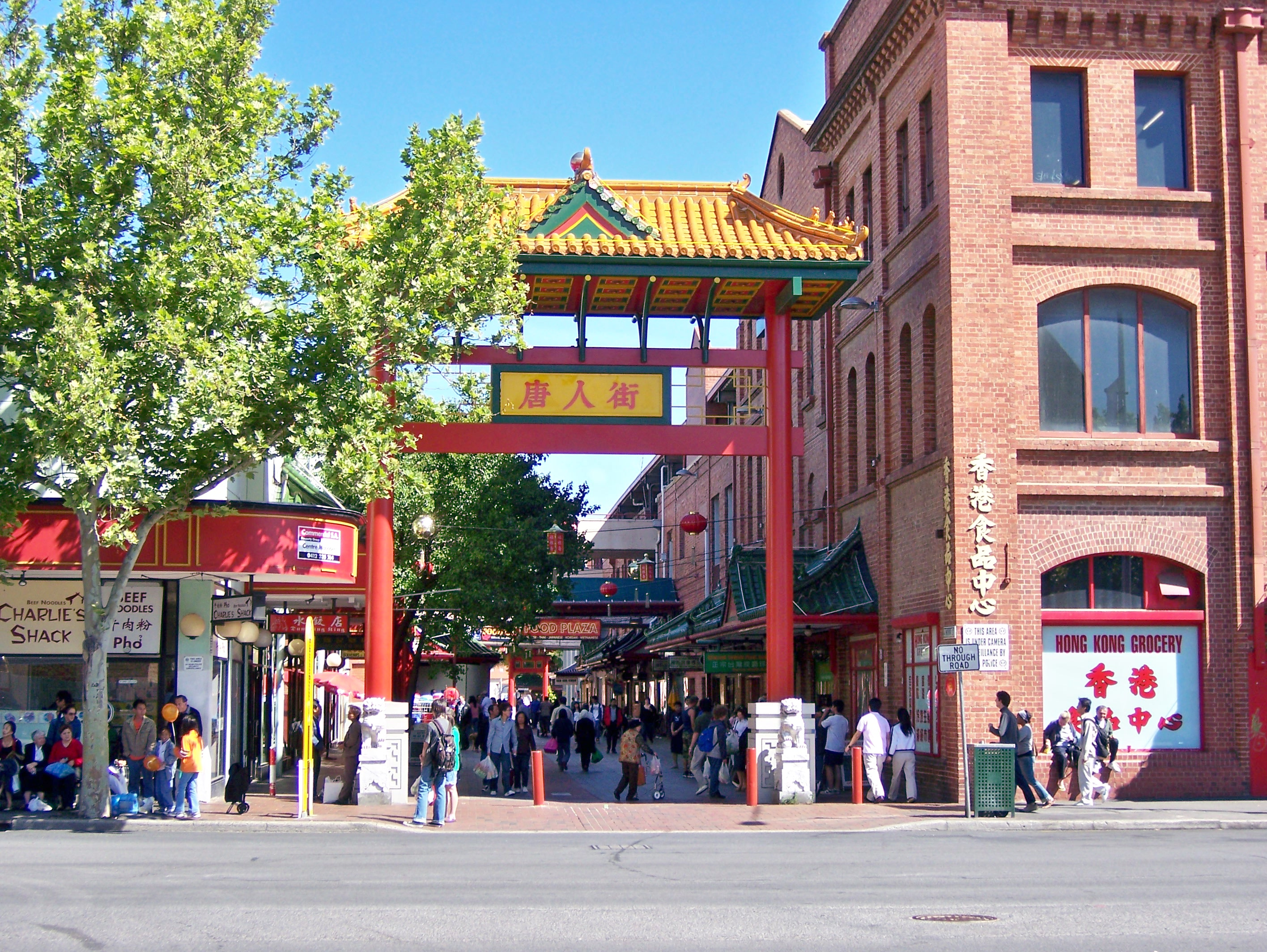
A paifang at the entrance of Chinatown on Moonta Street in the Central Market precinct

At the 2021 census, the most commonly nominated ancestries were:

- English (35.7%)
- Australian (29.2%) (Note: The Australian Bureau of Statistics has stated that most who nominate "Australian" as their ancestry are part of the Anglo-Celtic group.)
- Scottish (7.9%)
- Irish (7.5%)
- Italian (7.1%)
- German (6.3%)
- Chinese (4.5%)
- Indian (3.3%)
- Greek (2.9%)
- Vietnamese (1.7%)
- Australian Aboriginal (1.6%) (Note: Those who nominated their ancestry as "Australian Aboriginal". Does not include Torres Strait Islanders. This relates to nomination of ancestry and is distinct from persons who identify as Indigenous (Aboriginal or Torres Strait Islander) which is a separate question.)
- Dutch (1.6%)
- Filipino (1.4%)
- Polish (1.3%)

Overseas-born Adelaideans composed 31.3% of the total population at the 2021 census. The five largest groups of overseas-born were from England (5.7%), India (3.1%), Mainland China (1.8%), Vietnam (1.2%) and Italy (1.1%).

Suburbs including Newton, Payneham and Campbelltown in the east and Torrensville, West Lakes and Fulham to the west, have large Greek and Italian communities. The Italian consulate is located in the western suburb of Hindmarsh. Large Vietnamese populations are settled in the north-western suburbs of Woodville, Kilkenny, Pennington, Mansfield Park and Athol Park and also Parafield Gardens and Pooraka in Adelaide's north. Migrants from India and Sri Lanka have settled into inner suburban areas of Adelaide including the inner northern suburbs of Blair Athol, Kilburn and Enfield and the inner southern suburbs of Plympton, Park Holme and Kurralta Park.

Suburbs such as Para Hills, Salisbury, Ingle Farm and Blair Athol in the north and Findon, West Croydon and Seaton and other Western suburbs have sizeable Afghan communities. Chinese migrants favour settling in the eastern and north eastern suburbs including Kensington Gardens, Greenacres, Modbury and Golden Grove. Mawson Lakes has a large international student population, due to its proximity to the University of South Australia campus.

At the 2021 census, 1.7% of Adelaide's population identified as being Indigenous — Aboriginal Australians and Torres Strait Islanders. (Note: Indigenous identification is separate to the ancestry question on the Australian Census and persons identifying as Aboriginal or Torres Strait Islander may identify any ancestry.)

=== Language ===
At the 2016 census, 75.4% of the population spoke English at home. The other languages most commonly spoken at home were Italian (2.1%), Standard Mandarin (2.1%), Greek (1.7%) Vietnamese (1.4%), and Cantonese (0.7%). The Kaurna language, spoken by the area's original inhabitants, had no living speakers in the middle of the 20th century, but since the 1990s there has been a sustained revival effort from academics and Kaurna elders.

=== Religion ===
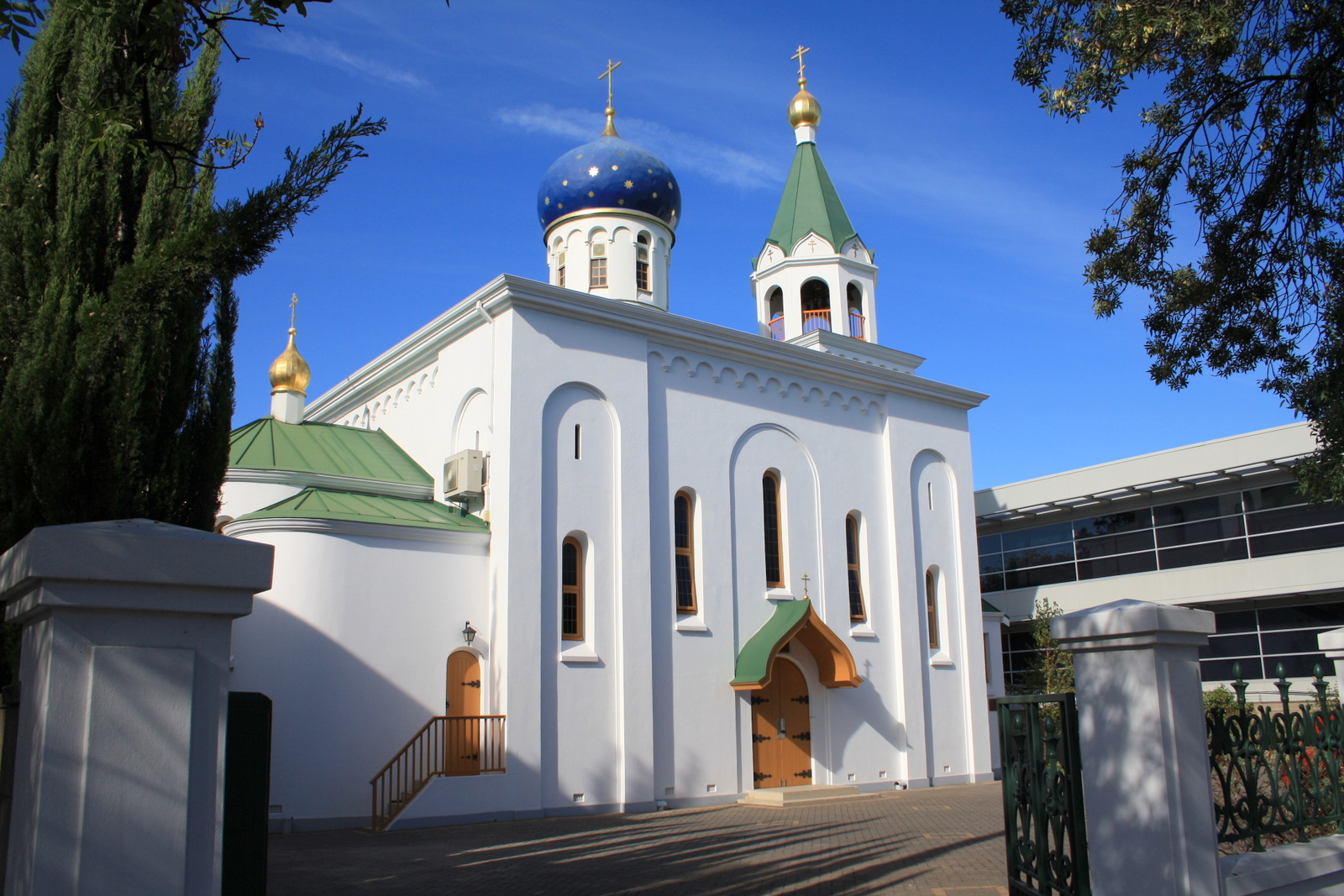
St Nicholas Church, a Russian Orthodox church in Wayville. Adelaide's 19th century moniker was The City of Churches.

Adelaide was founded on a vision of religious tolerance that attracted a wide variety of religious practitioners. This led to it being known as The City of Churches. But approximately 28% of the population expressed no religious affiliation in the 2011 Census, compared with the national average of 22.3%, making Adelaide one of Australia's least religious cities. According to 2021 census, 39.8% of the population of Adelaide identify as Christian, with the largest denominations being Catholic (16.4%), Anglican (7.0%), Uniting Church (3.9%) and Greek Orthodox (2.4%). Non-Christian faith communities, representing 9.5% from Adelaide's population, include Islam (2.8%), Hinduism (2.7%) and Buddhism (2.3%).

The Jewish community of the city dates back to 1840. Eight years later, 58 Jews lived in the city. A synagogue was built in 1871, when 435 Jews lived in the city. Many took part in the city councils, such as Judah Moss Solomon (1852–66). Three Jews have been elected to the position of city mayor. In 1968, the Jewish population of Adelaide numbered about 1,200; in 2001, according to the Australian census, 979 persons declared themselves to be Jewish by religion. In 2011, over 1,000 Jews were living in the city, served by an Orthodox synagogue, Adelaide Hebrew Congregation and a Reform synagogue, Beit Shalom, in addition to a virtual Jewish museum. Massada College, a Jewish day school opened in the city in 1976 and closed in 2011. The Adelaide Holocaust Museum and Andrew Steiner Education Centre opened in 2020.

The "Afghan" community in Australia first became established in the 1860s when camels and their Pathan, Punjabi, Baluchi and Sindhi handlers began to be used to open up settlement in the continent's arid interior. Until eventually superseded by the advent of the railways and motor vehicles, camels played an invaluable economic and social role in transporting heavy loads of goods to and from isolated settlements and mines. This is acknowledged by the name of The Ghan, the passenger train operating between Adelaide, Alice Springs, and Darwin. The Central Adelaide Mosque is regarded as Australia's oldest permanent mosque; an earlier mosque at Marree in northern South Australia, dating from 1861 to 1862 and subsequently abandoned or demolished, has now been rebuilt.

== Economy ==
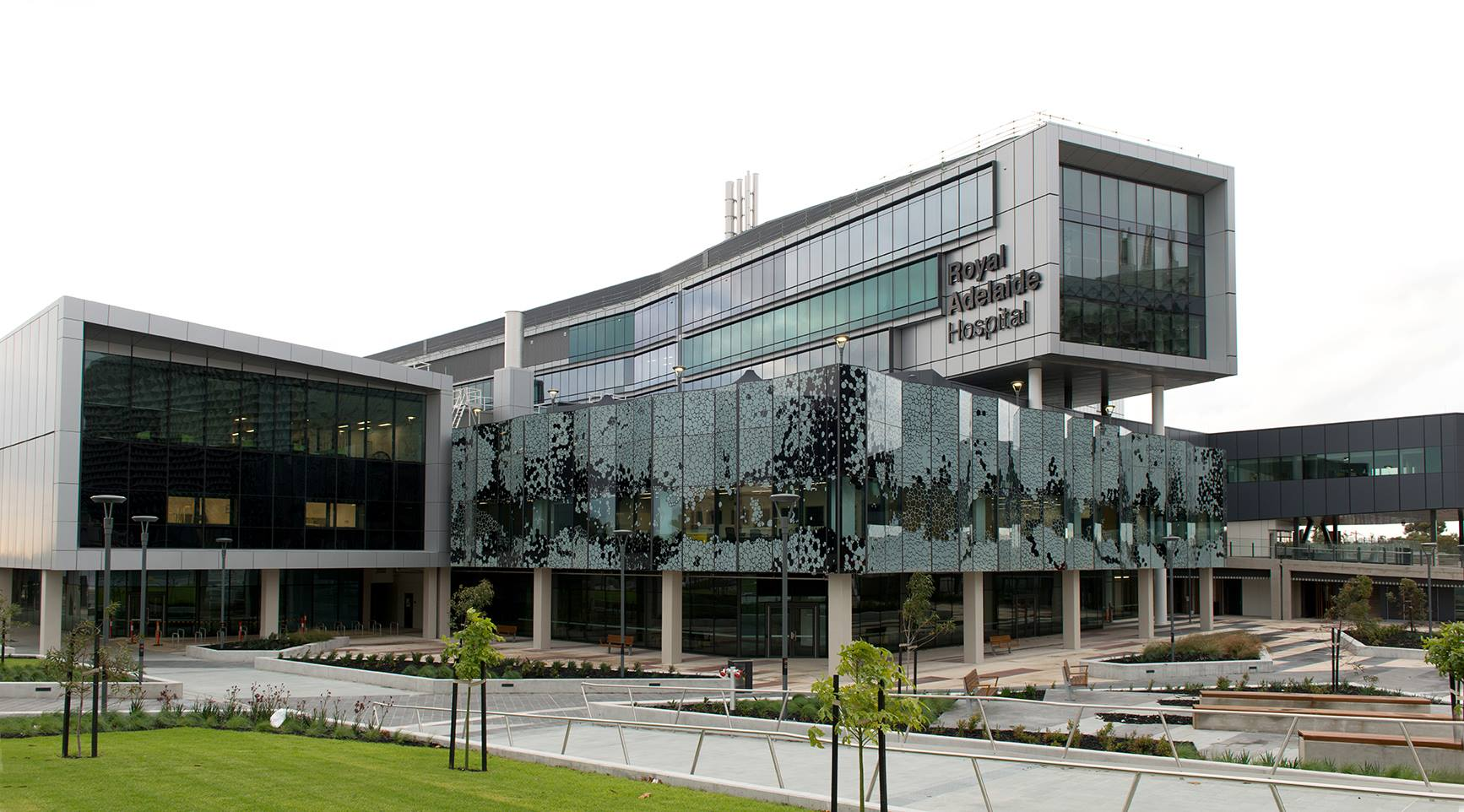
The new Royal Adelaide Hospital opened in 2017. Health care and social assistance is the largest ABS-defined employment sector in South Australia.

South Australia's largest employment sectors are health care and social assistance, surpassing manufacturing in SA as the largest employer since 2006–07. In 2009–10, manufacturing in SA had average annual employment of 83,700 persons compared with 103,300 for health care and social assistance. Health care and social assistance represented nearly 13% of the state average annual employment. The Adelaide Hills wine region is an iconic and viable economic region for both the state and country in terms of wine production and sale. The 2014 vintage is reported as consisting of 5,836 t (5,744 long tons; 6,433 short tons) red grapes crushed valued at A$8,196,142 and 12,037 t (11,847 long tons; 13,269 short tons) white grapes crushed valued at $14,777,631.

The retail trade is the second largest employer in SA (2009–10), with over 91,900 jobs, and 12 per cent of the state workforce.

Manufacturing, defence technology, high-tech electronic systems and research, commodity export and corresponding service industries all play a role in the SA economy. Almost half of all cars produced in Australia were made in Adelaide at the Holden Elizabeth Plant in Elizabeth. The site ceased operating in November 2017.

The collapse of the State Bank in 1992 resulted in large levels of state public debt (as much as A$4 billion). The collapse meant that successive governments enacted lean budgets, cutting spending, which was a setback to the further economic development of the city and state. As of January 2026, the government has an AA+ credit rating.

The global media conglomerate News Corporation was founded in, and until 2004 incorporated in, Adelaide, and the city is still considered the corporation's "spiritual" home by its founder, Rupert Murdoch. Australia's largest oil company, Santos, prominent South Australian brewery, Coopers, and national retailer Harris Scarfe also call Adelaide their home.

In 2018, at which time more than 80 organisations employed 800 people in the space sector in South Australia, Adelaide was chosen for the headquarters of a new Australian Space Agency. The agency opened its in 2020. It is working to triple the size of the Australian space industry and create 20,000 new jobs by 2030.

=== Defence industry ===
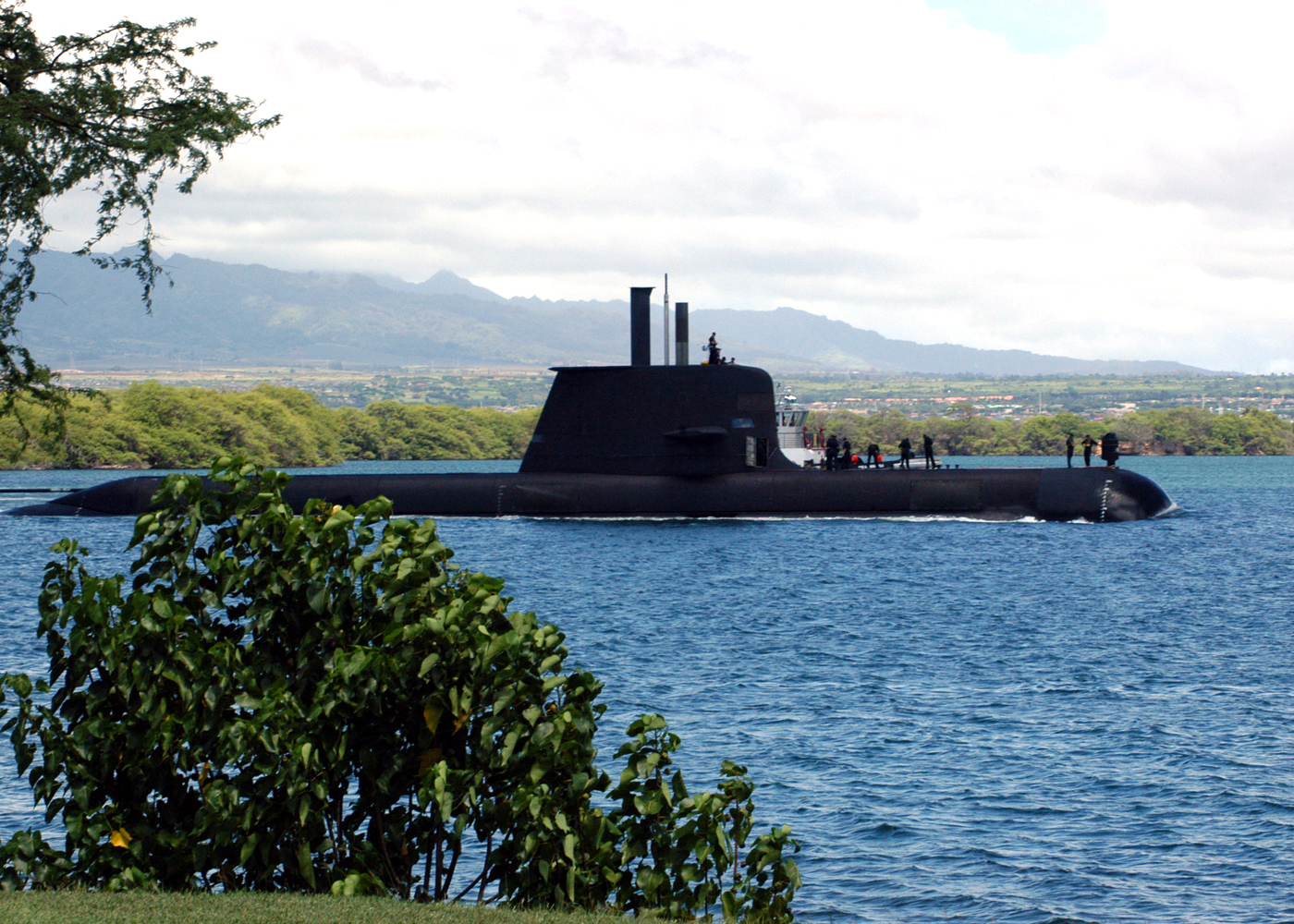
The Adelaide-built Collins-class submarine HMAS Rankin entering Pearl Harbor, August 2004

Adelaide is home to a large proportion of Australia's defence industries, which contribute over A$1 billion to South Australia's Gross State Product. The principal government military research institution, the Defence Science and Technology Organisation, and other defence technology organisations such as BAE Systems Australia and Lockheed Martin Australia, are north of Salisbury and west of Elizabeth in an area now called "Edinburgh Parks", adjacent to RAAF Base Edinburgh.

Others, such as Saab Systems and Raytheon, are in or near Technology Park. ASC Pty Ltd, is based in the industrial suburb of Osborne and is also a part of Technology Park. South Australia was charged with constructing Australia's Collins-class submarines and more recently the A$6 billion contract to construct the Royal Australian Navy's new air-warfare destroyers.

=== Employment statistics ===
As of November 2015, Greater Adelaide had an unemployment rate of 7.4% with a youth unemployment rate of 15%.

The median weekly individual income for people aged 15 years and over was $447 per week in 2006, compared with $466 nationally. The median family income was $1,137 per week, compared with $1,171 nationally. Adelaide's housing and living costs are substantially lower than that of other Australian cities, with housing being notably cheaper. The median Adelaide house price is half that of Sydney and two-thirds that of Melbourne. The three-month trend unemployment rate to March 2007 was 6.2%. The Northern suburbs' unemployment rate is disproportionately higher than the other regions of Adelaide at 8.3%, while the East and South are lower than the Adelaide average at 4.9% and 5.0% respectively.

=== House prices ===
Over the decade March 2001 – March 2010, Metropolitan Adelaide median house prices approximately tripled. (approx. 285% – approx. 11%p.a. compounding) In the five years March 2007 – March 2012, prices increased by approx. 27% – approx. 5%p.a. compounding. March 2012 – March 2017 saw a further increase of 19% – approx. 3.5%p.a. compounding.

In summary:

March	2001	2002	2003	2004	2005	2006	2007	2008	2009	2010
Median	$140,000	$170,000	$200,000	$250,000	$270,000	$280,000	$300,000	$360,000	$350,000	$400,000
% change		21%	18%	25%	8%	4%	7%	20%	−3%	14%
March	2011	2012	2013	2014	2015	2016	2017	2018	2019	2020
Median	$400,000	$380,000	$393,000	$413,000	$425,000	$436,000	$452,000	$470,000	$478,500	
% change	0%	−5%	3%	5%	3%	3%	4%			
All numbers approximate and rounded. Since March 2012, the REISA no longer release a median house price for the Adelaide Metropolitan area, so figures retrieved are from Dept of the Premier and Cabinet.

Each quarter, The Alternative and Direct Investment Securities Association (ADISA) publishes a list of median house sale prices by suburb and Local Government Area. (Previously, this was done by REISA) Due to the small sizes of many of Adelaide's suburbs, the low volumes of sales in these suburbs, and (over time) the huge variations in the numbers of sales in a suburb in a quarter, statistical analysis of "the most expensive suburb" is unreliable; the suburbs appearing in the "top 10 most expensive suburbs this quarter" list is constantly varying. Quarterly Reports for the last two years can be found on the REISA website.

== Education and research ==
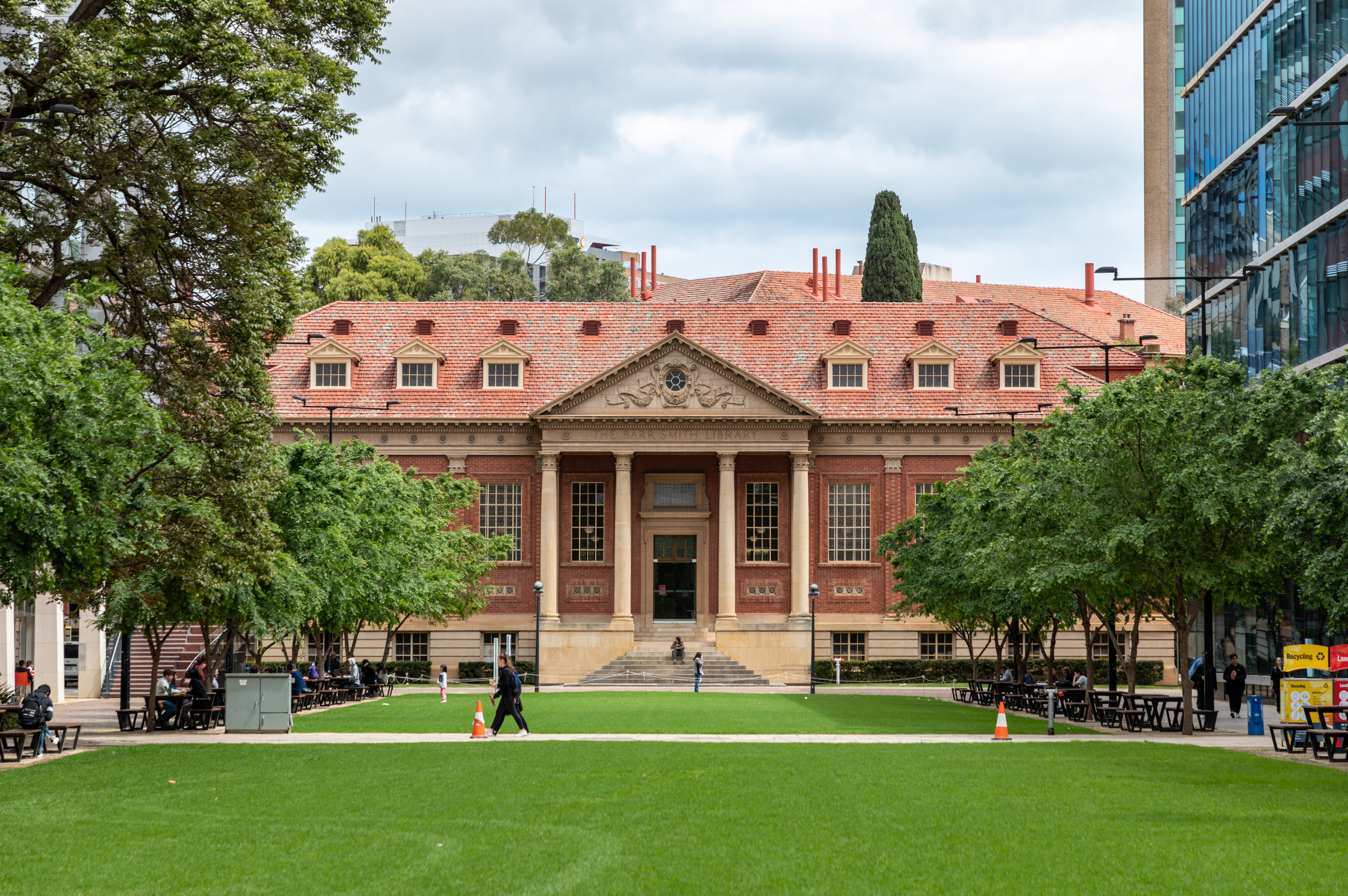
Barr Smith Library, part of the Adelaide University

Education forms an increasingly important part of the city's economy, with the South Australian Government and educational institutions attempting to position Adelaide as "Australia's education hub" and marketing it as a "Learning City". The number of international students studying in Adelaide has increased rapidly in recent years to 30,726 in 2015, of which 1,824 were secondary school students. Adelaide is the birthplace of three Nobel laureates, more than any other Australian city: physicist William Lawrence Bragg and pathologists Howard Florey and Robin Warren, all of whom completed secondary and tertiary education at St Peter's College and the University of Adelaide.

Adelaide is also the hometown of mathematician Terence Tao.

=== Primary and secondary education ===
There are two systems of primary and secondary schools, a public system operated by the South Australian Government's Department for Education, and a private system of independent and Catholic schools. South Australian schools provide education under the Australian Curriculum for reception to Year 10 students. In Years 10 to 12, students study for the South Australian Certificate of Education (SACE). They have the option of incorporating vocational education and training (VET) courses or a flexible learning option (FLO). South Australia also has 24 schools that use International Baccalaureate programs as an alternative to the Australian Curriculum or SACE. These programs include the IB Primary Years Programme, the IB Middle Years Programme, and the IB Diploma Programme.

For South Australian students who cannot attend a traditional school, including students who live in rural or remote areas, the state government runs the Open Access College (OAC), which provides virtual teaching. The OAC has a campus in Marden which caters to students from reception to Year 12 and adults who haven't been able to complete their SACE. Guardians are also able to apply for their child to be educated from home as long as they provide an education program which meets the same requirements as the Australian Curriculum as well as opportunities for social interaction.

=== Tertiary education ===
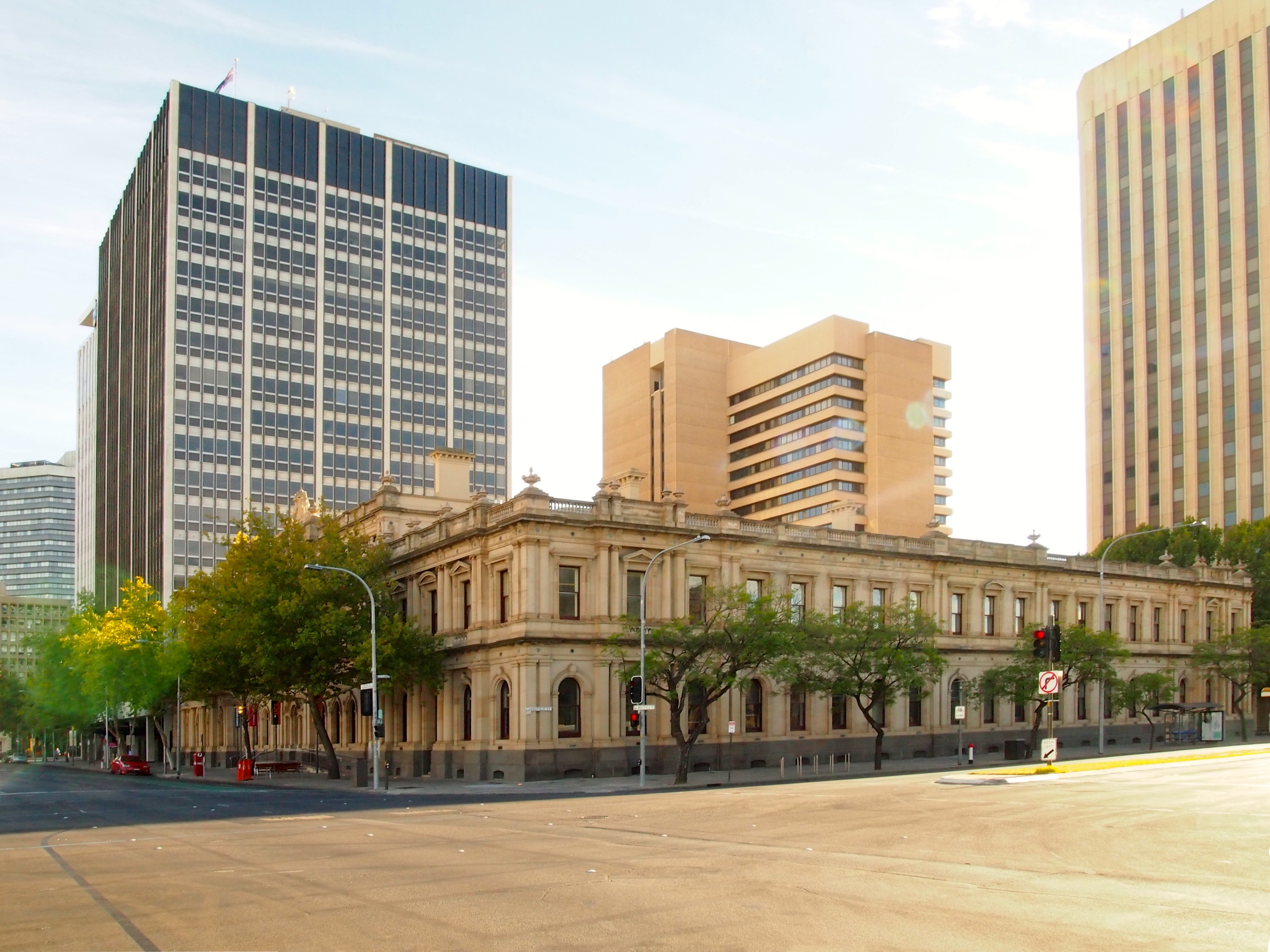
Historic Torrens Building in Victoria Square houses campuses of several international universities operating in South Australia

There are two public universities local to Adelaide, as well as one private university and three constituent colleges of foreign universities. Flinders University of South Australia, Adelaide University and Torrens University Australia—part of the Laureate International Universities are based in Adelaide. The University of Adelaide was ranked in the top 150 universities worldwide. Flinders ranked in the top 250 and Uni SA in the top 300. Torrens University Australia is part of an international network of over 70 higher education institutions in more than 30 countries worldwide.

Adelaide University is a recent amalgamation between the University of Adelaide and the University of South Australia, ranked in the top 150 globally and top 10 nationally. Today, it stands as Australia's third-oldest university and a member of the leading "Group of Eight". The merged university has over 64,000 students and two main campuses on North Terrace, with many other campuses across South Australia, including in Whyalla and Mount Gambier. The two universities had multiple proposals to merge into a single university. A proposal in 2018 failed due to uncertainty as to the new name and leadership of the merged university. In 2022, the universities announced a new merger proposal, with the name and leadership issues settled and support from the South Australian government.

Flinders University, with 25,184 students, is based in the southern suburb of Bedford Park, alongside the Flinders Medical Centre, with additional campuses in neighbouring Tonsley and in Victoria Square in the city centre.

In 2024, the University of the Sunshine Coast opened a new campus in Adelaide where undergraduate and master's courses in ICT and business are offered.

The Adelaide College of Divinity is at Brooklyn Park.

There are several South Australian TAFE (Technical and Further Education) campuses in the metropolitan area that provide a range of vocational education and training. The Adelaide College of the Arts, as a school of TAFE SA, provides nationally recognised training in visual and performing arts.

The Workers' Educational Association of South Australia (WEA-SA) is an independent not-for-profit adult education organisation based in Adelaide. Established in 1913, it is one of Australia's longest running providers of community-based adult learning. WEA-SA delivers short courses, lectures, cultural programs, travel and interest clubs designed to promote lifelong learning.

StudyAdelaide, a collaboration between the South Australian government and the tertiary education sector, maintains an on-line list of schools, universities, and higher education institutions in SA.

=== Research ===
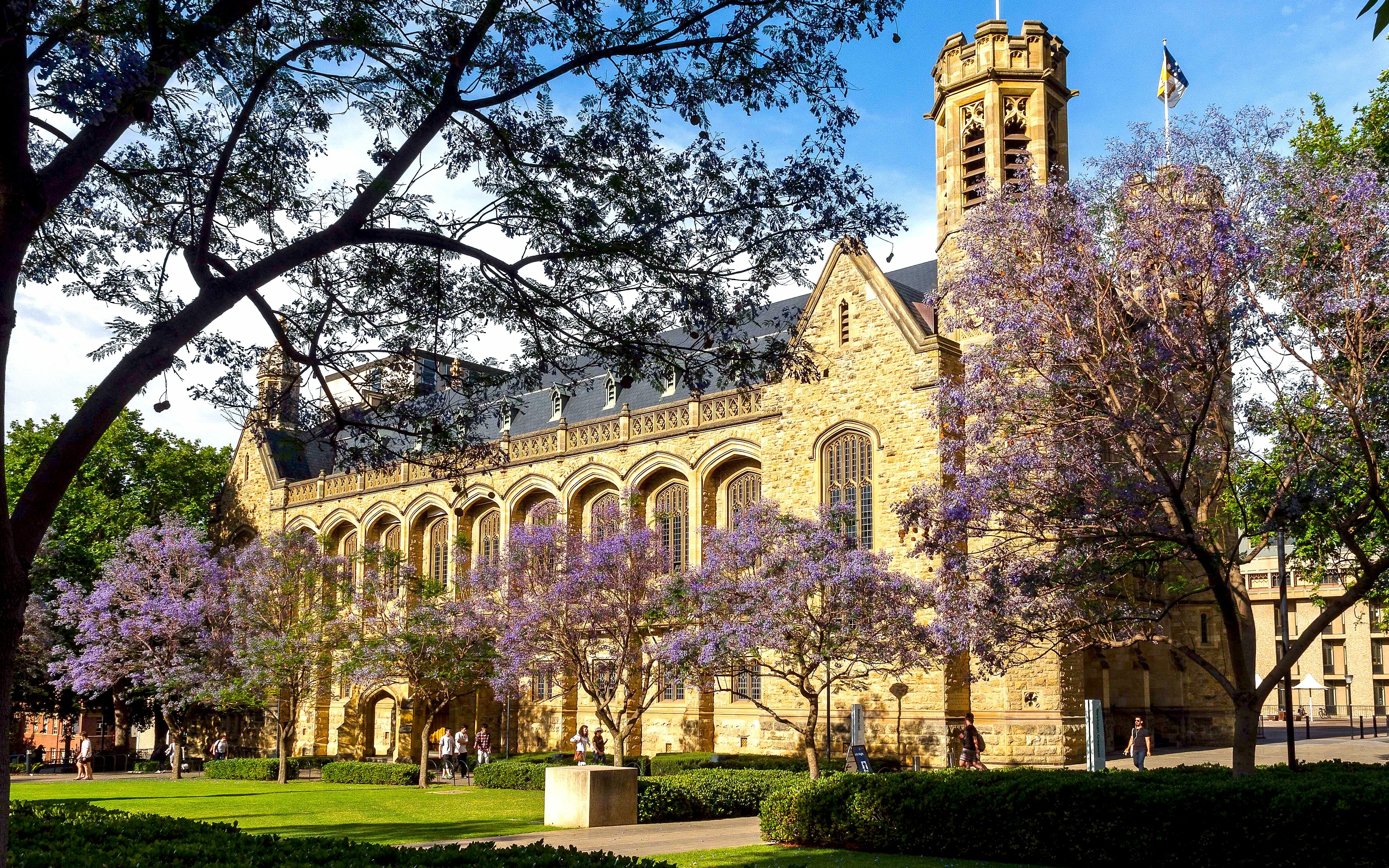
Bonython Hall, Adelaide University

In addition to the universities, Adelaide is home to research institutes, including the Royal Institution of Australia, established in 2009 as a counterpart to the two-hundred-year-old Royal Institution of Great Britain. Many of the organisations involved in research tend to be geographically clustered throughout the Adelaide metropolitan area:

- The east end of North Terrace: SA Pathology; Hanson Institute; National Wine Centre.
- The west end of North Terrace: South Australian Health and Medical Research Institute (SAHMRI), located next to the Royal Adelaide Hospital.
- The Waite Research Precinct: SARDI Head Office and Plant Research Centre; AWRI; ACPFG; CSIRO research laboratories. SARDI also has establishments at Glenside and West Beach.
- Edinburgh, South Australia: DSTO; BAE Systems (Australia); Lockheed Martin Australia Electronic Systems.
- Technology Park (Mawson Lakes): BAE Systems; Optus; Raytheon; Topcon; Lockheed Martin Australia Electronic Systems.
- Research Park at Thebarton: businesses involved in materials engineering, biotechnology, environmental services, information technology, industrial design, laser/optics technology, health products, engineering services, radar systems, telecommunications and petroleum services.
- Science Park (adjacent to Flinders University): Playford Capital.
- The Basil Hetzel Institute for Translational Health Research in Woodville the research arm of the Queen Elizabeth Hospital, Adelaide
- The Joanna Briggs Institute, a global research collaboration for evidence-based healthcare with its headquarters in North Adelaide.
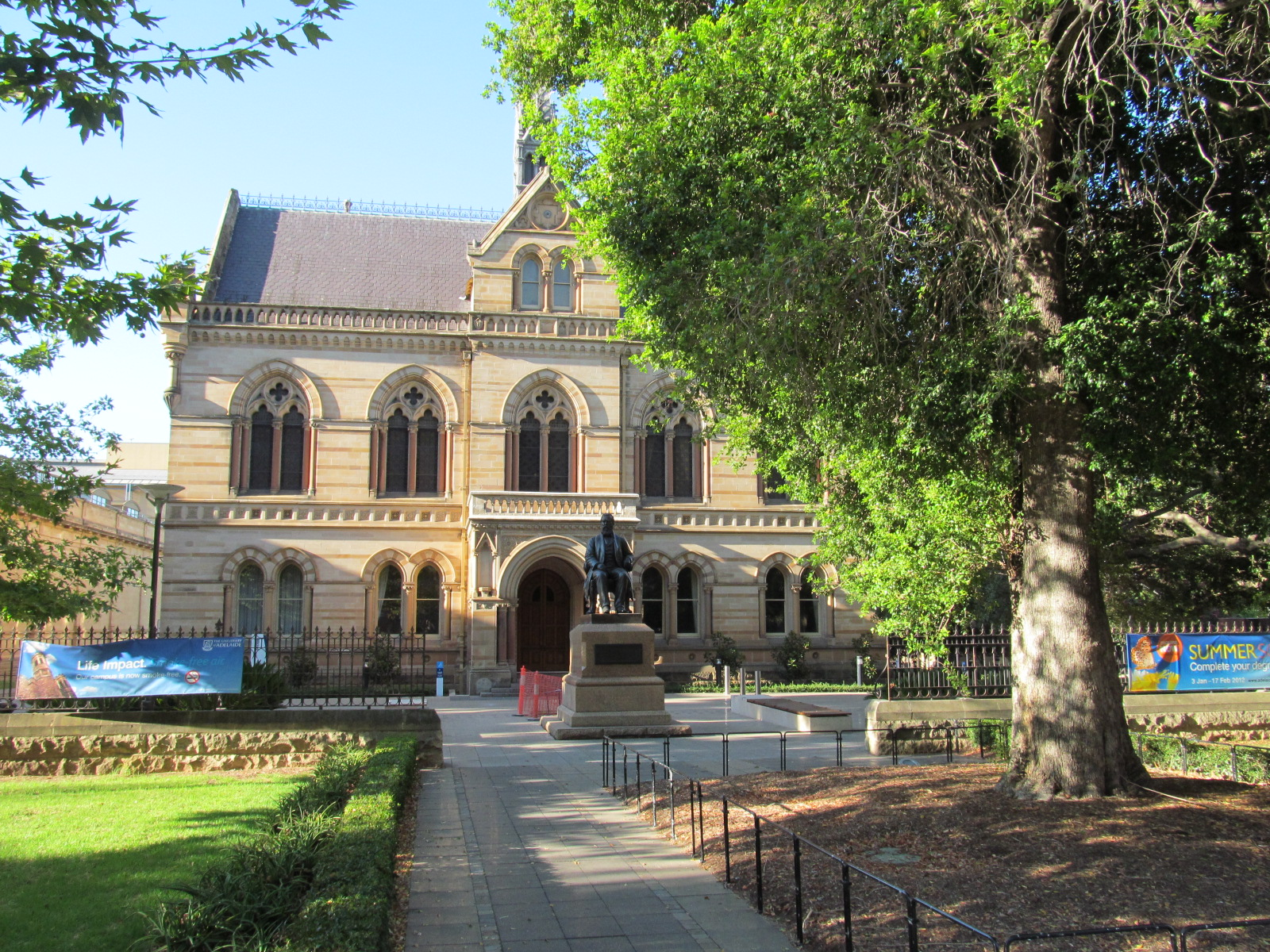
Mitchell Building, Adelaide University (City East)

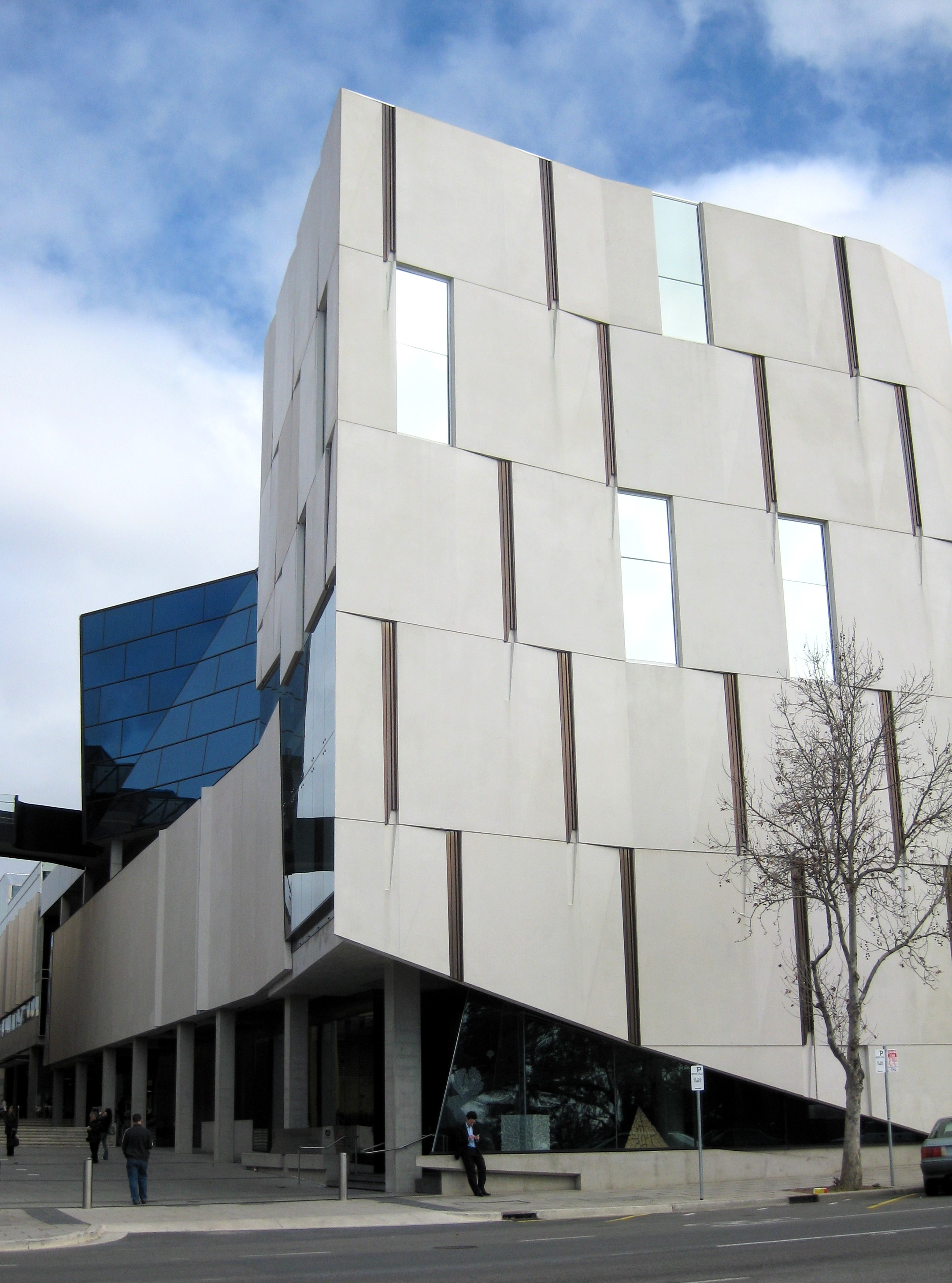
The Hawke Building, Adelaide University (City West)

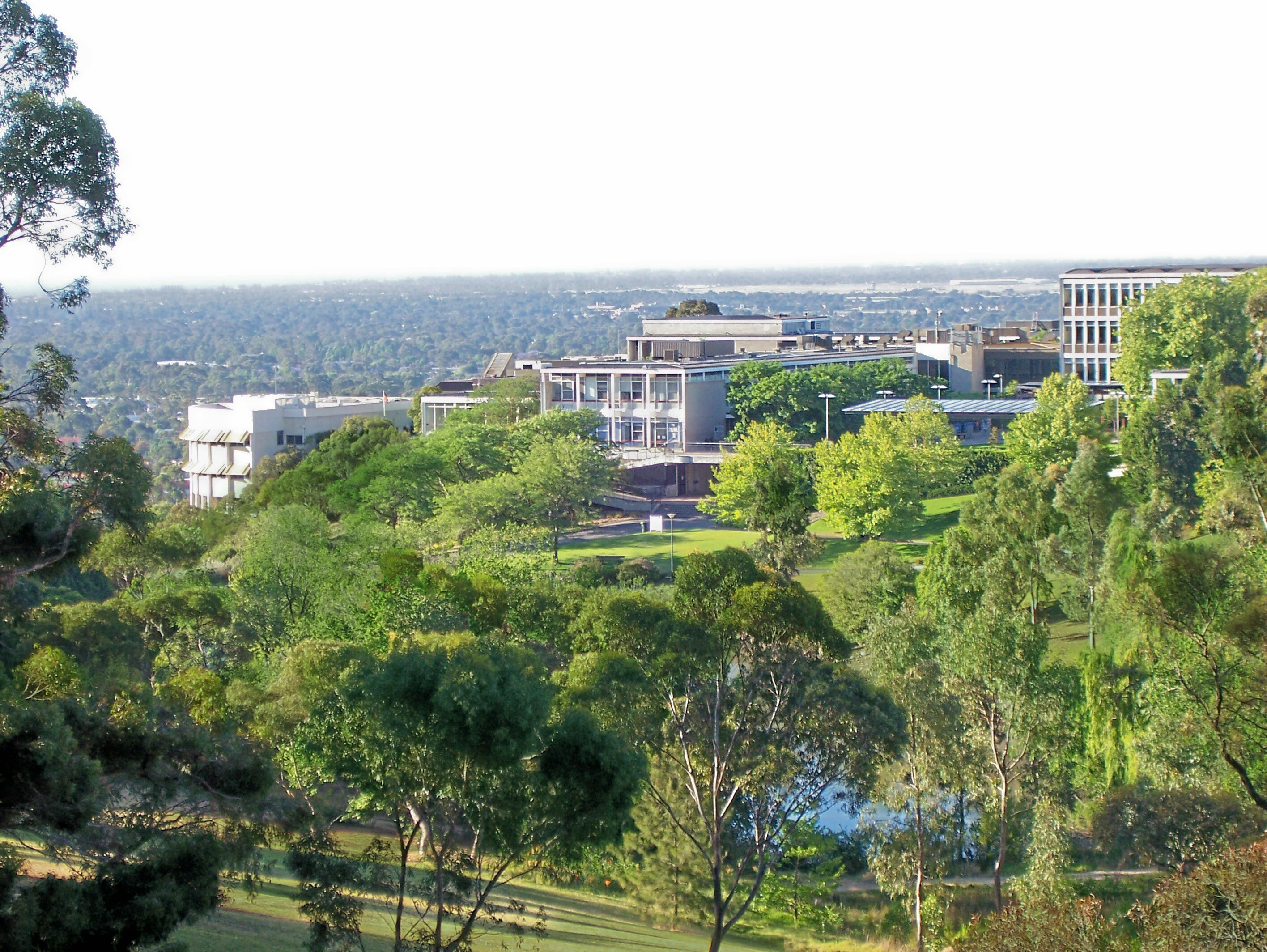
Flinders University buildings from the campus hills

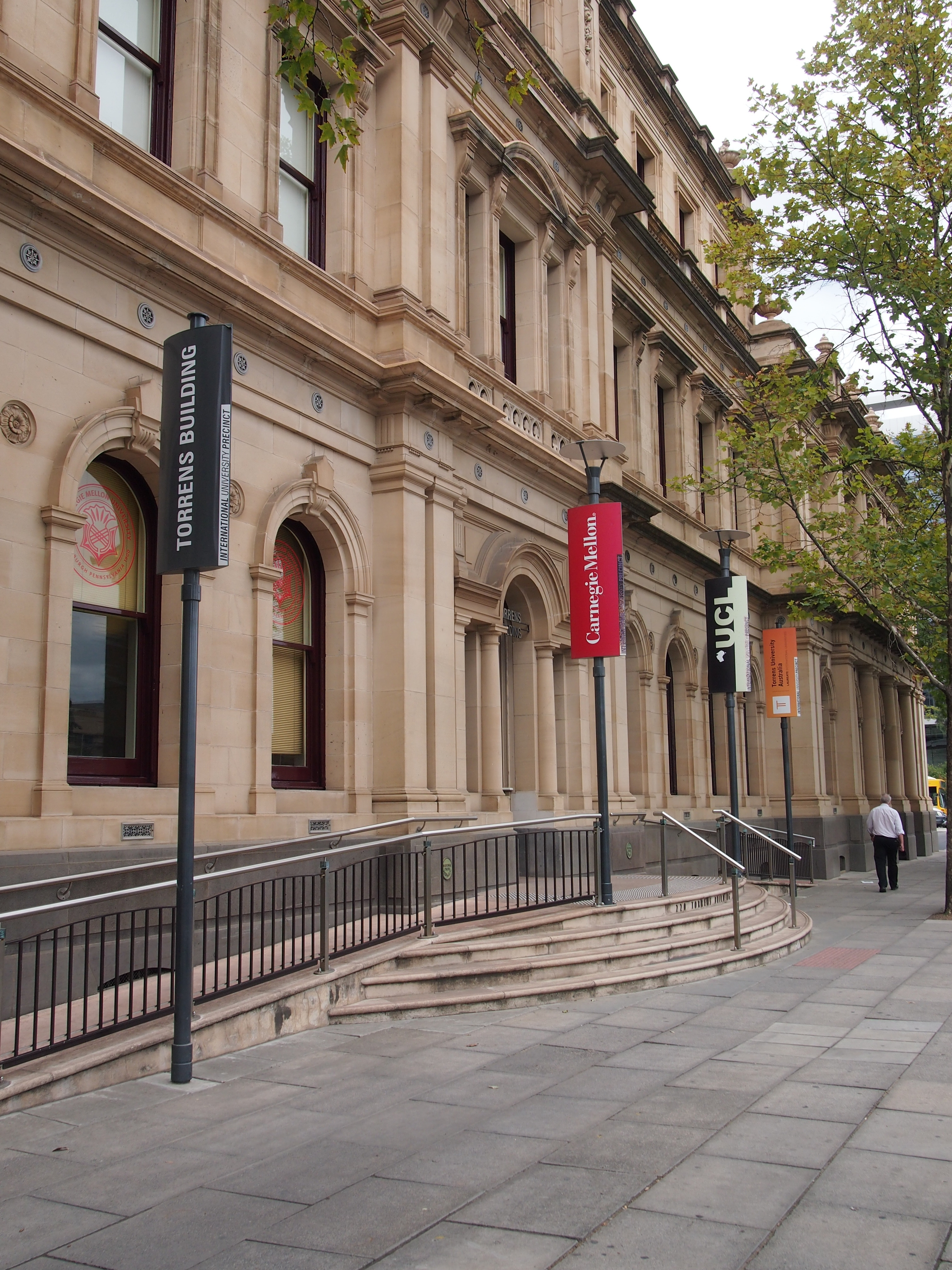
Torrens University

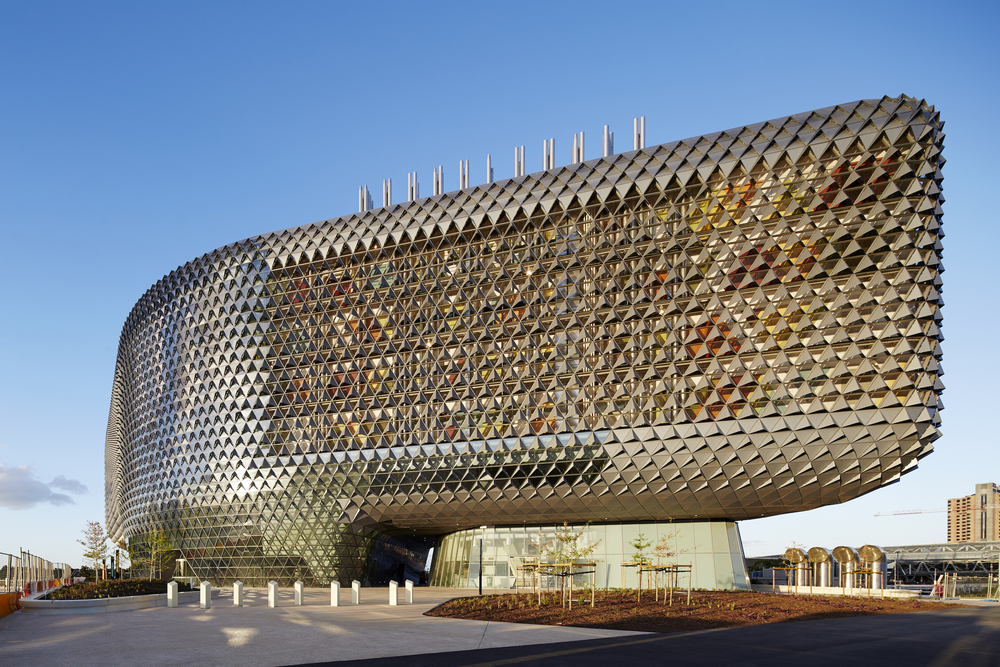
South Australian Health and Medical Research Institute (SAHMRI)

== Cultural life ==
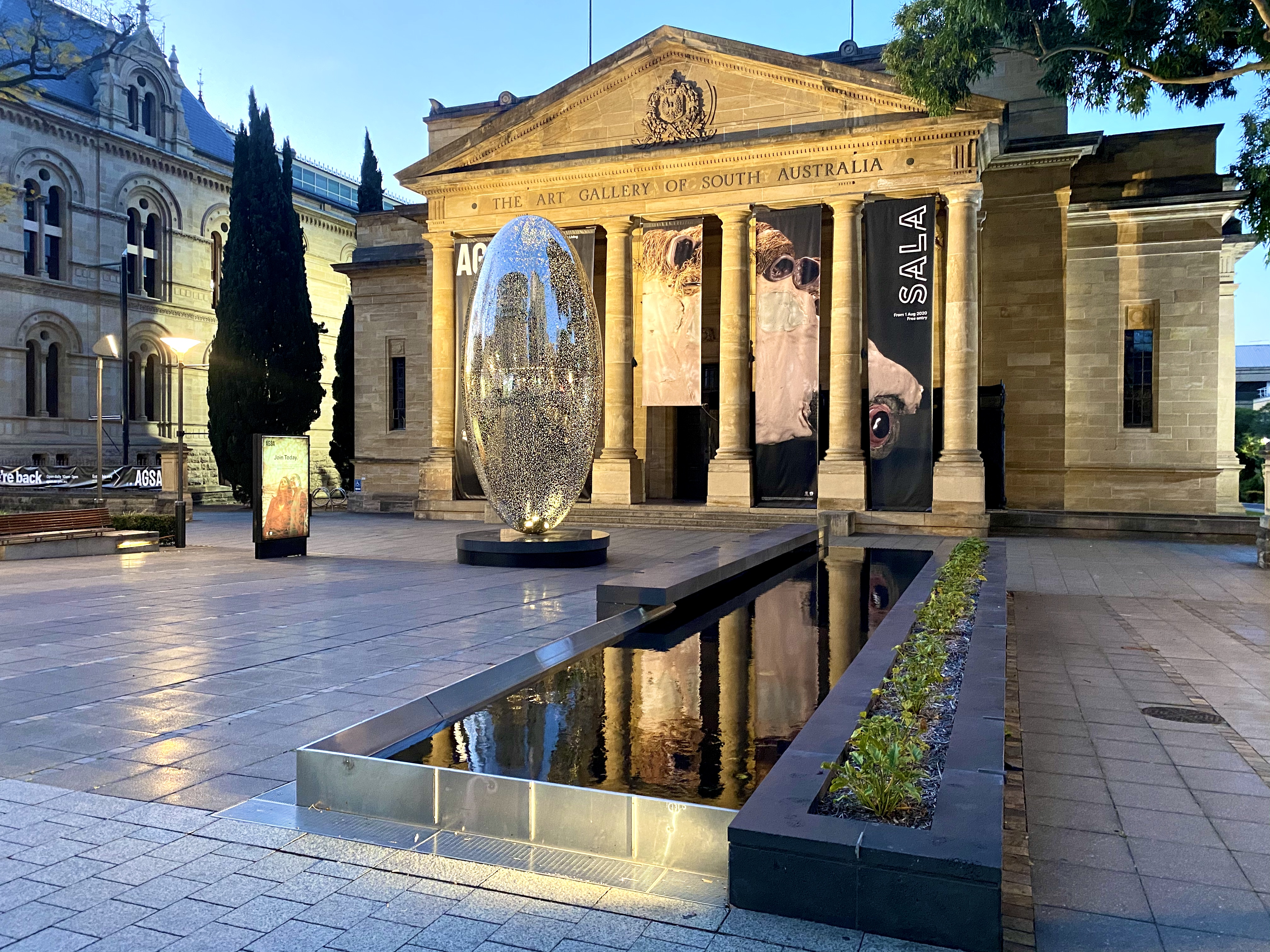
The Art Gallery of South Australia on North Terrace

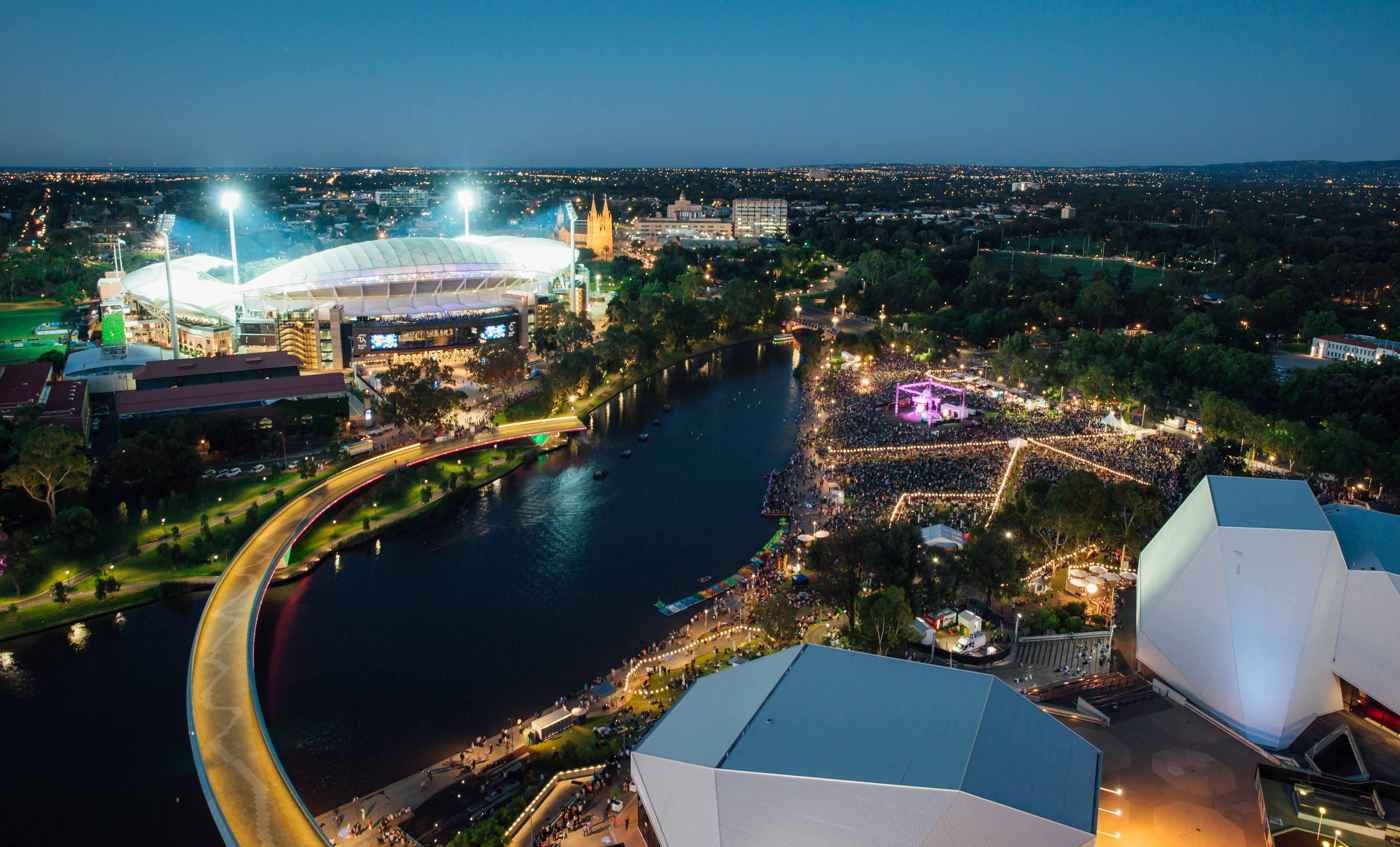
New Year's Eve celebrations in Elder Park on the River Torrens (mid right), Adelaide Oval (further, left) and Adelaide Festival Centre (near right) are also in view.

While established as a British province, and very much English in terms of its culture, Adelaide attracted immigrants from other parts of Europe early on, including German and other European non-conformists escaping religious persecution. The first German Lutherans arrived in 1838, bringing with them the vine cuttings that they used to found the acclaimed wineries of the Barossa Valley.

The Royal Adelaide Show is an annual agricultural show and state fair, established in 1839 and now a huge event held in the Adelaide Showground annually.

Adelaide's arts scene flourished in the 1960s and 1970s with the support of successive premiers from both major political parties. The renowned Adelaide Festival of Arts was established in 1960 under Thomas Playford, which in the same year spawned an unofficial uncurated series of performances and exhibits which grew into the Adelaide Fringe. Construction of the Adelaide Festival Centre began under Steele Hall in 1970 and was completed under the subsequent government of Don Dunstan, who also established the South Australian Film Corporation in 1972 and the State Opera of South Australia in 1976.

Over time, the Adelaide Festival expanded to include Adelaide Writers' Week and WOMADelaide, and other separate festivals were established, such as the Adelaide Cabaret Festival (2002), the Adelaide Festival of Ideas (1999), the Adelaide Film Festival (2013), FEAST (1999, a queer culture), Tasting Australia (1997, a food and wine affair), and Illuminate Adelaide (2021). With the Festival, the Fringe, WOMADelaide, Writers' Week and the Adelaide 500 street motor racing event (along with evening music concerts) all happening in early March, the period became known colloquially as "Mad March".

In 2014, Ghil'ad Zuckermann founded the Adelaide Language Festival.

There are many international cultural fairs, most notably the German Schützenfest and Greek Glendi. Adelaide holds an annual Christmas pageant, the world's largest Christmas parade.

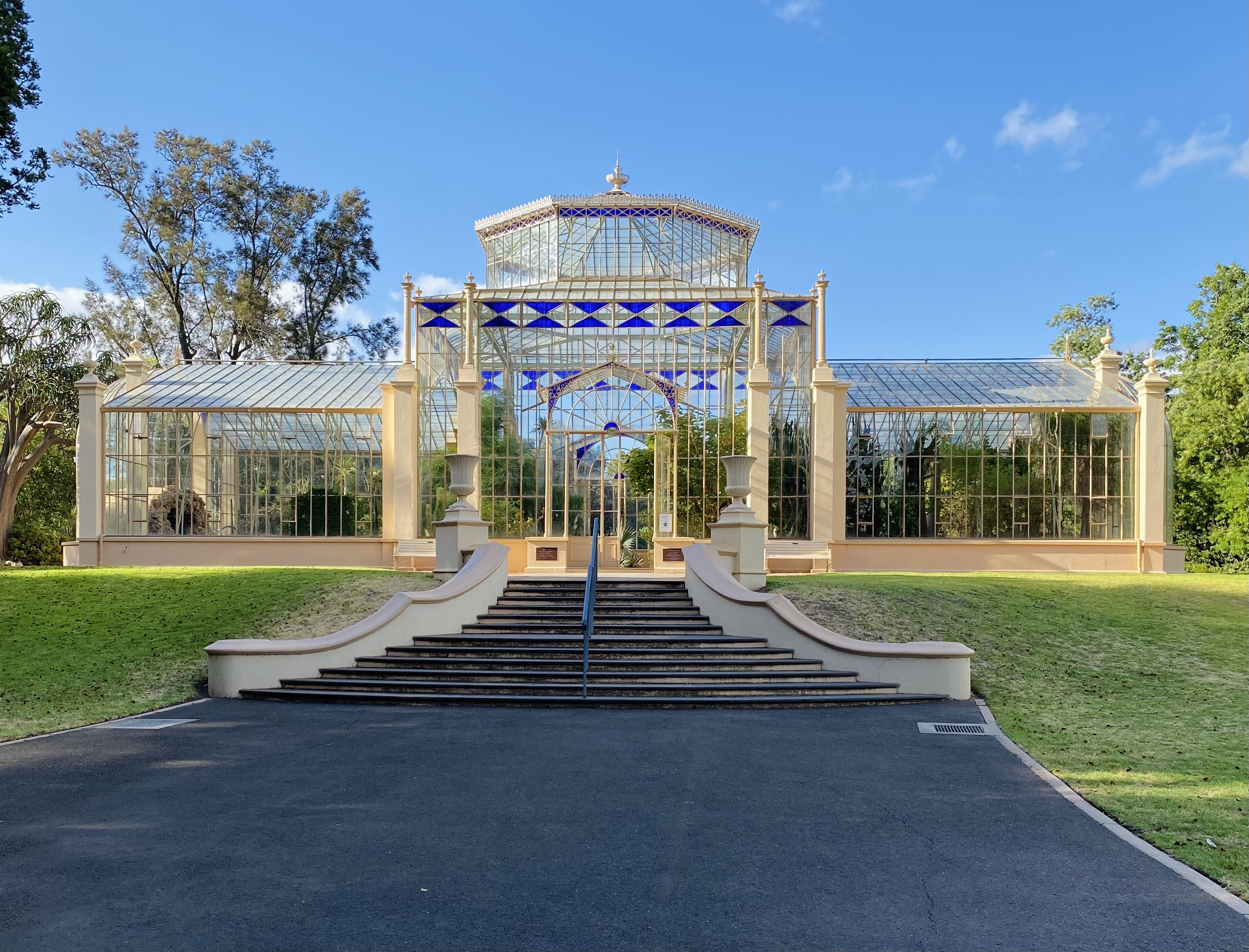
Palm House at the Adelaide Botanic Garden

=== North Terrace institutions ===
As the state capital, Adelaide has a great number of cultural institutions, many of them along the boulevard of North Terrace. The Art Gallery of South Australia, with about 35,000 works, holds Australia's second largest state-based collection. Adjacent are the South Australian Museum and State Library of South Australia. The Adelaide Botanic Garden, National Wine Centre and Tandanya National Aboriginal Cultural Institute are nearby in the East End of the city. In the back of the State Library lies the Migration Museum, Australia's oldest museum of its kind.

Further west, the Lion Arts Centre is home to ACE Open, which showcases contemporary art; Dance Hub SA; and other studios and arts industry spaces. The Mercury Cinema and the JamFactory ceramics and design gallery are just around the corner.

=== Performing arts venues ===
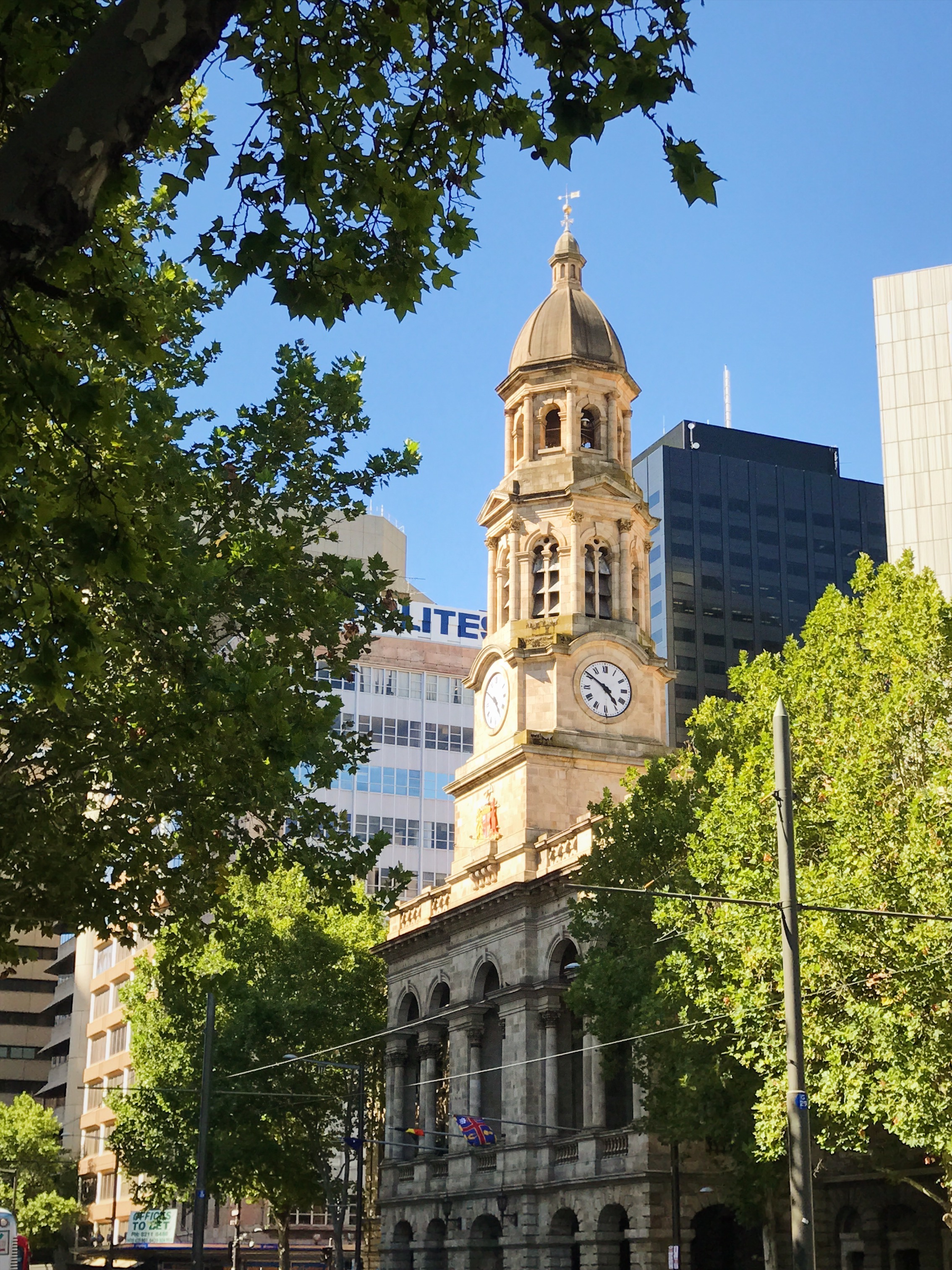
The Adelaide Town Hall

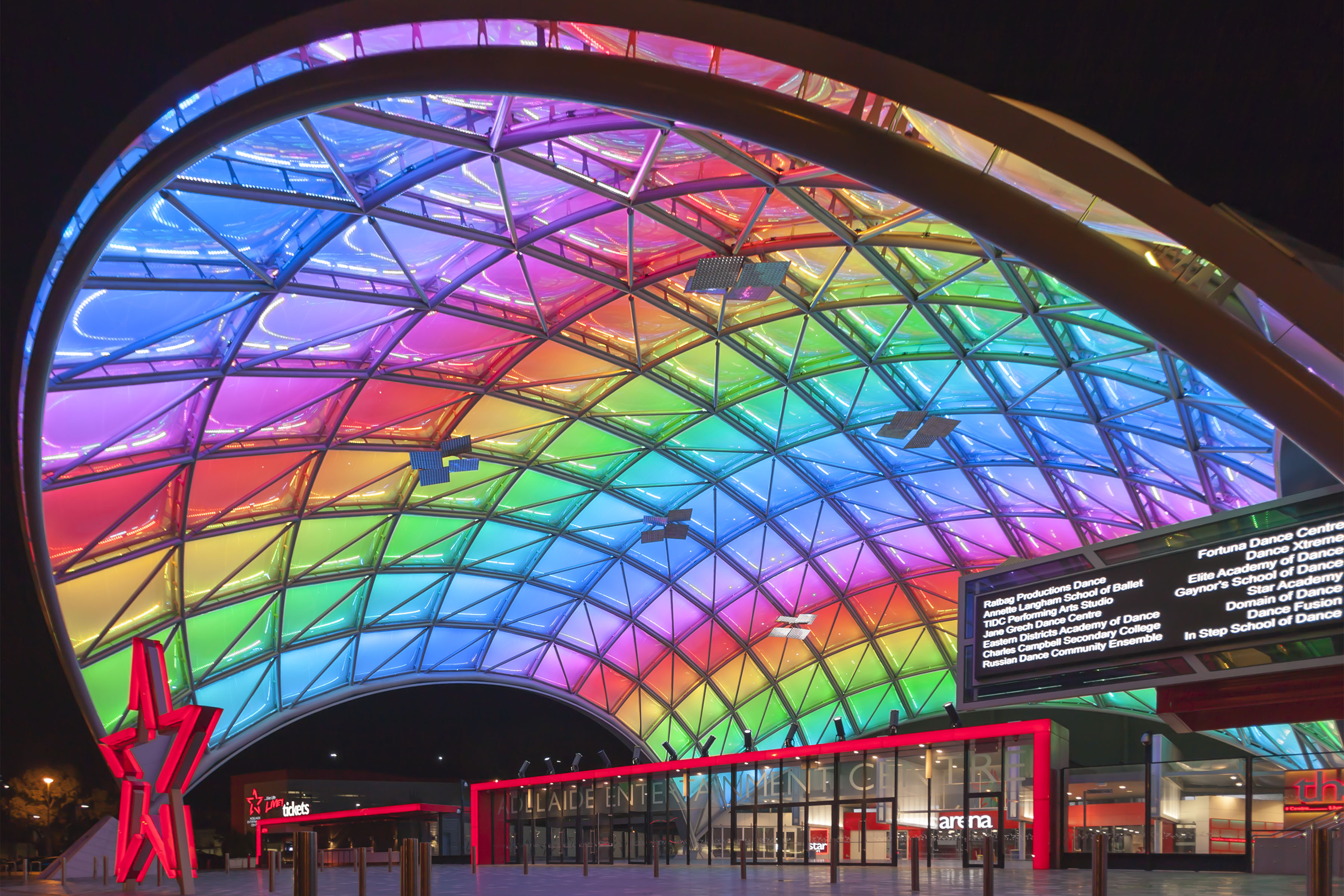
The Adelaide Entertainment Centre, the largest indoor sports and entertainment venue in Adelaide

The Adelaide Festival Centre (which includes the Dunstan Playhouse, Festival Theatre and Space Theatre), on the banks of the Torrens, is the focal point for much of the cultural activity in the city and home to the State Theatre Company of South Australia. Other live music and theatre venues include the Adelaide Entertainment Centre; Adelaide Oval; Memorial Drive Park; Thebarton Theatre; Adelaide Town Hall; Her Majesty's Theatre; Queen's Theatre; Holden Street Theatres; and the Hopgood Theatre.

The Lion Arts Factory, within the Lion Arts Centre, hosts contemporary music in a wide range of genres, as does "The Gov" in Hindmarsh. The city also has numerous smaller theatres, pubs and cabaret bars which host performances.

=== Music ===
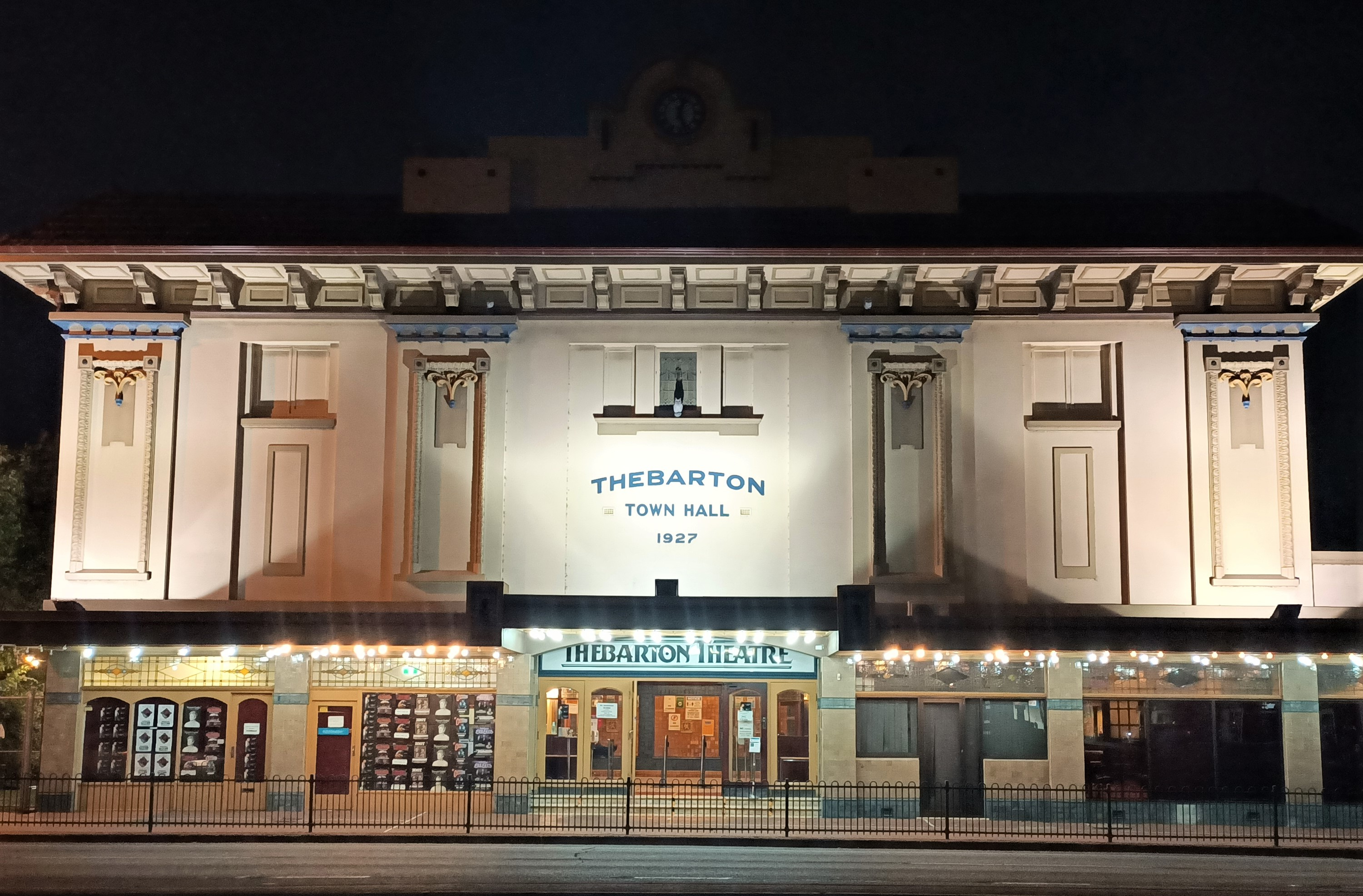
The Thebarton Theatre, colloquially known as the "Thebby", is one of South Australia's most popular live music venues.

In 2015, it was said that there were now more live music venues per capita in Adelaide than any other capital city in the southern hemisphere, Lonely Planet labelled Adelaide "Australia's live music city", and the city was recognised as a "City of Music" by the UNESCO Creative Cities Network. Although there were many pubs hosting live music in the CBD in past, the number has slowly diminished. The Grace Emily on Waymouth Street, which was refurbished as a live music venue around 2000, is popular with musicians and patrons alike. The Crown & Anchor ("the Cranker") was saved from demolition in 2024 after a vigorous campaign by the public as well as many musicians and politicians. New legislation passed on 11 September 2024 designates the entire Adelaide CBD as a "live music venue area", and gives protection to selected live music venues.

In addition to its own WOMAD (WOMADelaide), Adelaide has attracted several touring music festivals, including Creamfields, Laneway, and Groovin' (some since defunct).

Adelaide has produced musical groups and individuals who have achieved national and international fame. These include the Adelaide Symphony Orchestra, the Adelaide Youth Orchestra, rock bands The Angels, Atlas Genius, Cold Chisel, The Superjesus, Wolf & Cub, roots/blues group The Audreys, internationally acclaimed metal acts I Killed The Prom Queen and Double Dragon, popular Australian hip-hop outfit Hilltop Hoods, as well as pop acts like Sia, Orianthi, Guy Sebastian, and Wes Carr, and the internationally successful tribute act, The Australian Pink Floyd Show.

Noted rocker Jimmy Barnes (formerly lead vocalist with Cold Chisel) spent most of his youth in the northern suburb of Elizabeth. Australian singer-songwriter Paul Kelly grew up in Adelaide and was head prefect at Rostrevor College. The first Australian Idol winner, Guy Sebastian, hails from the north-eastern suburb of Golden Grove.

=== Television ===
Adelaide is served by numerous digital free-to-air television channels:

1. ABC
2. ABC HD (ABC broadcast in HD)
3. ABC Family
4. ABC Entertains
5. ABC News
6. SBS
7. SBS HD (SBS broadcast in HD)
8. SBS World Movies HD
9. SBS Viceland HD
10. SBS Food
11. NITV
12. SBS WorldWatch
13. Seven
14. 7HD (Seven broadcast in HD)
15. 7two
16. 7mate
17. 7Bravo
18. 7flix
19. Racing.com
20. Nine
21. 9HD (Nine broadcast in HD)
22. 9Gem
23. 9Go!
24. 9Life
25. 9Gem HD
26. 9Rush
27. Extra
28. 10
29. 10 HD (10 broadcast in HD)
30. 10 Drama
31. 10 Comedy
32. Nickelodeon
33. TVSN
34. Gecko TV
35. C44 Adelaide (Adelaide's community TV station)

All of the five Australian national television networks broadcast both high-definition digital and standard-definition digital television services in Adelaide. They share three transmission towers on the ridge near the summit of Mount Lofty. There are two other transmission sites at 25 Grenfell Street, Adelaide and Elizabeth Downs. The two government-funded stations are run by the Australian Broadcasting Corporation (ABC South Australia) and the Special Broadcasting Service (SBS). The Seven Network and Network Ten both own their Adelaide stations (SAS-7 and ADS-10 respectively). Adelaide's NWS-9 is part of the Nine Network. Adelaide also has a community television station, Channel 44.

As part of a nationwide phase-out of analogue television in Australia, Adelaide's analogue television service was shut down on 2 April 2013.

=== Radio ===
There are 20 radio stations that serve the metropolitan area, as well as four stations that serve only parts of the metropolitan area; six commercial stations, six community stations, six national stations and two narrowcast stations.

DAB+ digital radio has been broadcasting in metropolitan Adelaide since 20 May 2009, and currently offers a choice of 41 stations all operated by the existing licensed radio broadcasters, which includes high-quality simulcast of all AM and FM stations.

== Sport ==
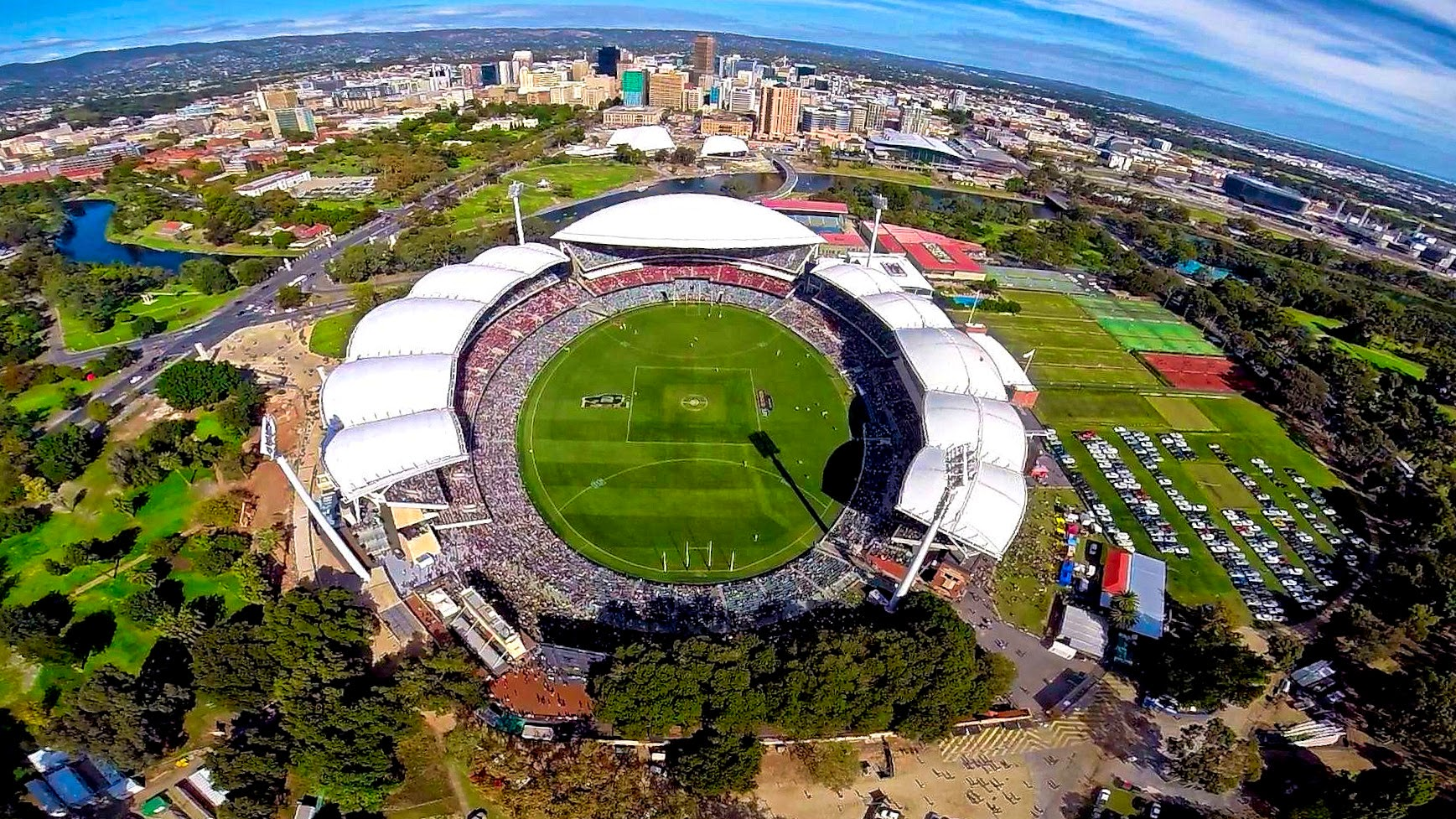
Adelaide Oval is the home of Australian Rules football and cricket in South Australia.

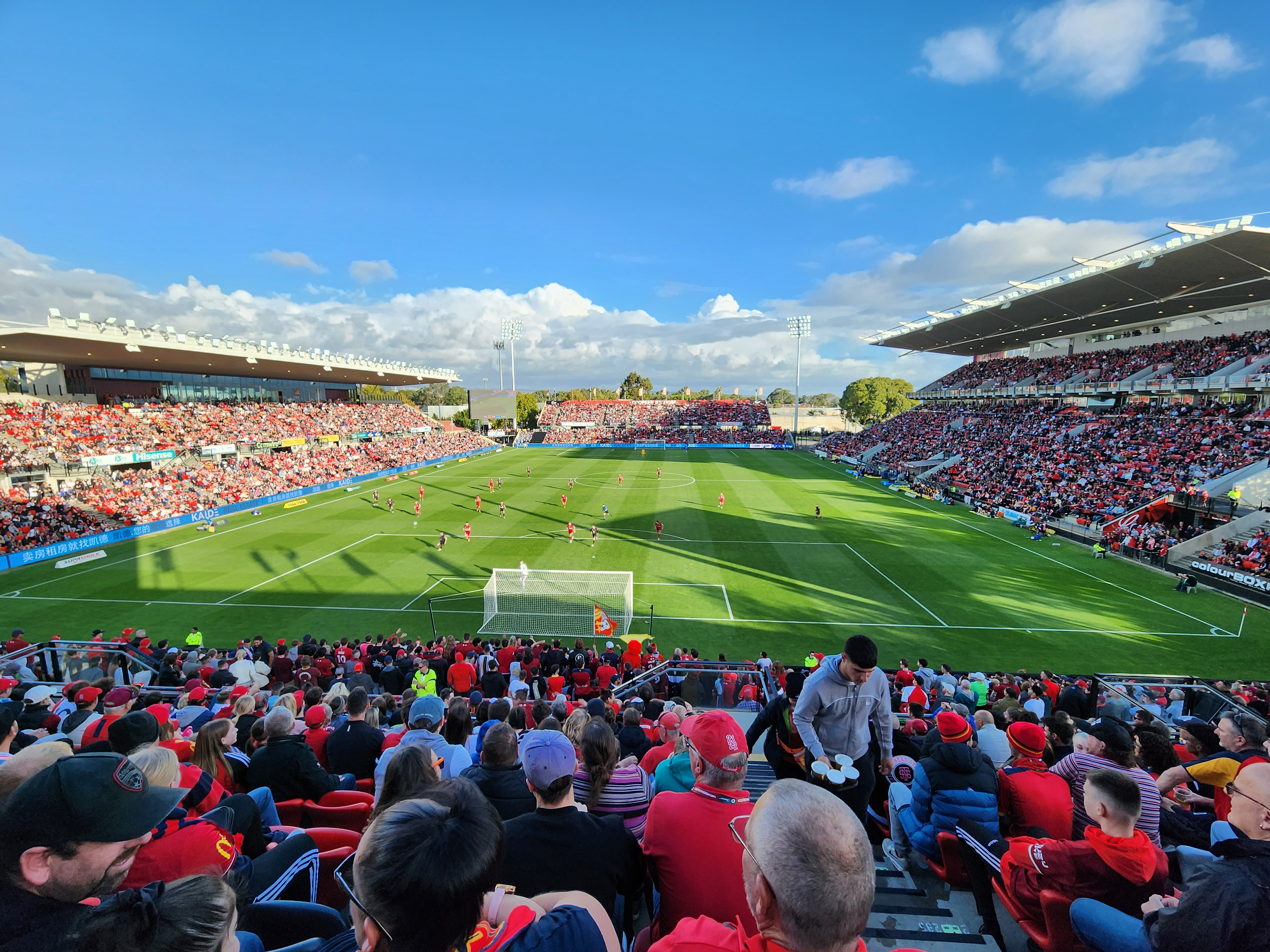
Coopers Stadium hosts Adelaide United.

The main sports played professionally in Adelaide are Australian Rules football, soccer, cricket, netball, and basketball. Adelaide is the home of two Australian Football League teams: the Adelaide Football Club and Port Adelaide Football Club, and one A-League soccer team, Adelaide United. A local Australian rules football league, the South Australian National Football League (SANFL), is made up of 10 teams from around Adelaide. The SANFL has been in operation since 1877 when it began as the South Australian Football Association (SAFA) before changing its name to the SANFL in 1927. The SANFL is the oldest surviving football league of any code played in Australia.

Until the completion of the 2012–14 renovation and upgrade of the Adelaide Oval, most large sporting events took place at either Football Park (the then home base of the Adelaide Crows, and the then Port Adelaide home game venue), or the historic Adelaide Oval, home of the South Australia Redbacks and the Adelaide Strikers cricket teams. Since completion of the upgrade, home games for Adelaide Crows and Port Adelaide now take place at Adelaide Oval.

Since 1884, Adelaide Oval has also hosted an international cricket test every summer, along with a number of One Day International cricket matches. Memorial Drive Park, adjacent to the Adelaide Oval, used to host Davis Cup and other major tennis events, including the Australian Open and the Adelaide International. Adelaide's professional association football team, Adelaide United, play in the A-League. Founded in 2003, their home ground is Coopers Stadium, which has a capacity of 16,500 and is one of the few purpose-built soccer stadia in Australia. Prior to United's foundation, Adelaide City and West Adelaide represented the city in the National Soccer League. The two sides, which contest the Adelaide derby against one another, now play in the National Premier Leagues South Australia.

For two years, 1997 and 1998, Adelaide was represented in Australia's top level rugby league, after the New South Wales Rugby League had played a single game per season at the Adelaide Oval for five years starting in 1991. The Adelaide Rams were formed and played in the breakaway Super League (SL) competition in 1997 before moving to the new National Rugby League in 1998. Initially playing at the Adelaide Oval, the club moved to the more suitable Hindmarsh Stadium late in the 1998 season. As part of a peace deal with the Australian Rugby League to end the Super League war, the club's owners News Limited (who were also owners of the SL) suddenly closed the club only weeks before the start of the 1999 season.

Adelaide has two professional basketball teams, the men's team being the Adelaide 36ers which plays in the National Basketball League (NBL) and the women's team, the Adelaide Lightning which plays in the Women's National Basketball League (WNBL). The Adelaide 36ers play at the Adelaide Entertainment Centre while the Adelaide Lightning play at the Adelaide Arena (Previously Titanium Security Arena). Adelaide has a professional netball team, the Adelaide Thunderbirds, which plays in the national netball competition, the Super Netball championship, with home games played at Netball SA Stadium. The Thunderbirds occasionally play games or finals at the Titanium Security Arena, while international netball matches are usually played at the 10,500 seat Adelaide Entertainment Centre. The Titanium Security Arena has a capacity of 8,000 and is the largest purpose-built basketball stadium in Australia.

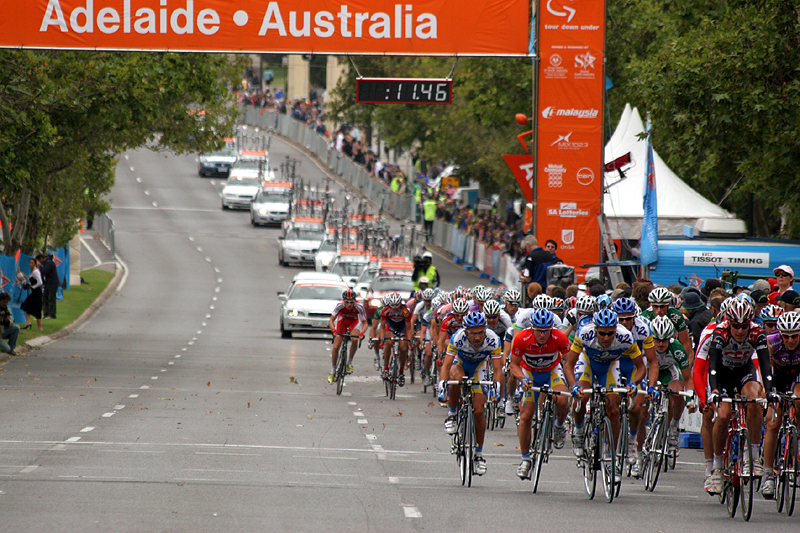
The Tour Down Under is the first event of the UCI World Tour calendar.

Since 1999 Adelaide and its surrounding areas have hosted the Tour Down Under bicycle race, organised and directed by Adelaide-based Michael Turtur. Turtur won an Olympic gold medal for Australia in the 4000 m team pursuit at the 1984 Los Angeles Olympics. The Tour Down Under was the first event outside Europe to be granted UCI ProTour status.

The 2024 Women's Tour Down Under cycle stage race was held in and around Adelaide, South Australia from 12 to 14 January 2024.

Adelaide maintains a franchise in the Australian Baseball League, the Adelaide Giants. They have been playing since 2009, and their home stadium (until 2016) was Norwood Oval. From 2016 the team moved to the Diamond Sports Stadium located near the Adelaide International Airport due to renovations at Norwood.

Adelaide also has an ice hockey team, Adelaide Adrenaline in the Australian Ice Hockey League (AIHL). It was national champions in 2009 and plays its games at the IceArenA.

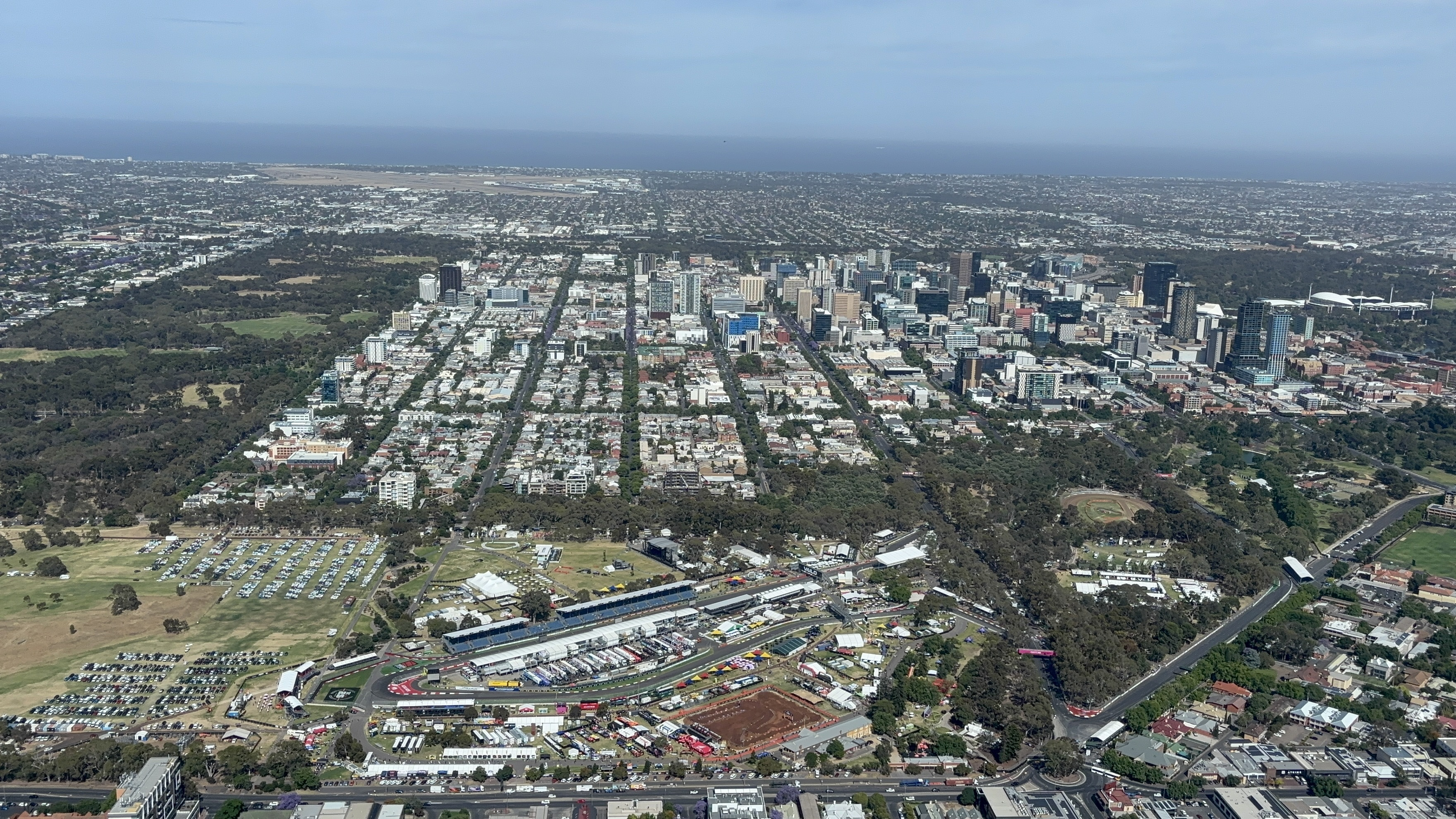
The Adelaide Street Circuit as seen from a helicopter in November 2024. The Adelaide Oval can also be seen on the right.

The Australian Grand Prix for World Championship Formula One racing was hosted by Adelaide from 1985 to 1995 on the Adelaide Street Circuit which was laid out in the city's East End as well as the eastern parklands including the Victoria Park Racecourse. The Grand Prix became a source of pride, and losing the event to Melbourne in a surprise announcement in mid-1993 left a void that has since been filled with the Adelaide 500 for V8 Supercar racing, held on a modified version of the same street circuit. The Classic Adelaide, a rally of classic sporting vehicles, is also held in the city and its surrounds.

Adelaide formerly had three horse racing venues. Victoria Park, Cheltenham Park Racecourse, both of which have now closed, and Morphettville Racecourse that remains the home of the South Australian Jockey Club. It also has Globe Derby Park for Harness racing that opened in 1969, and by 1973 had become Adelaide's premier harness racing venue taking over from the Wayville Showgrounds, as well as Greyhound Park for greyhound racing that opened in 1972.

The World Solar Challenge race attracts teams from around the world, most of which are fielded by universities or corporations, although some are fielded by high schools. The race has a 20-years' history spanning nine races, with the inaugural event taking place in 1987. Adelaide hosted the 2012 World Bowls Championships at Lockleys Bowling Club, becoming the third city in the world to have held the championships twice, having previously hosted the event in 1996.

Dirt track speedway is also popular in Adelaide with three operating speedways. Adelaide Motorsport Park, located adjacent to the Adelaide International Raceway road racing circuit at Virginia (24 km (15 mi) north of the city centre) has been in continuous operation since 1979 after the closure of the popular Rowley Park Speedway. Gillman Speedway located in the semi-industrial suburb of Gillman, has been in operation since 1998 and caters to Motorcycle speedway and Sidecars, while the Sidewinders Speedway located in Wingfield is also a motorcycle speedway dedicated to Under-16 riders and has been in operation since 1978.

In 2016, backed by South Australia's Peregrine Corporation opened up a multi-purpose facility; a state-of-the-art motorsporting park and a hotel alongside its newer OTR service station outside a small township of Tailem Bend currently named The Bend Motorsport Park. Design for thrill seekers and rev-heads the facility currently host South Australia's second Supercars motoring event during a round in August.

Adelaide is home to the Great Southern Slam, the world's largest roller derby tournament. The tournament has been held biennially over Australia's Queen's Birthday holiday weekend since 2010. In 2014, and 2016 the tournament featured 45 teams playing in two divisions. In 2018, the tournament has expanded to 48 teams competing in three divisions.

== Infrastructure ==
=== Transport ===
Adelaide's railway and tram network, served by the Adelaide Metro

Being centrally located on the Australian mainland, Adelaide forms a strategic transport hub for east–west and north–south routes. The city itself has a metropolitan public transport system managed by and known as the Adelaide Metro. The Adelaide Metro consists of a contracted bus system including the O-Bahn Busway, 7 commuter rail lines (diesel and electric), and a small tram network operating between inner suburb Hindmarsh, the city centre, and seaside Glenelg with more recent small offshoots in the city (to Botanical Gardens and Festival Plaza). Tramways were largely dismantled in the 1950s, but saw a revival in the 2010s with upgrades and extensions.

Road transport in Adelaide has historically been easier than many of the other Australian cities, with a well-defined city layout and wide multiple-lane roads from the beginning of its development. Adelaide was known as a "twenty-minute city", with commuters having been able to travel from metropolitan outskirts to the city proper in roughly twenty minutes. However, such arterial roads often experience traffic congestion as the city grows.

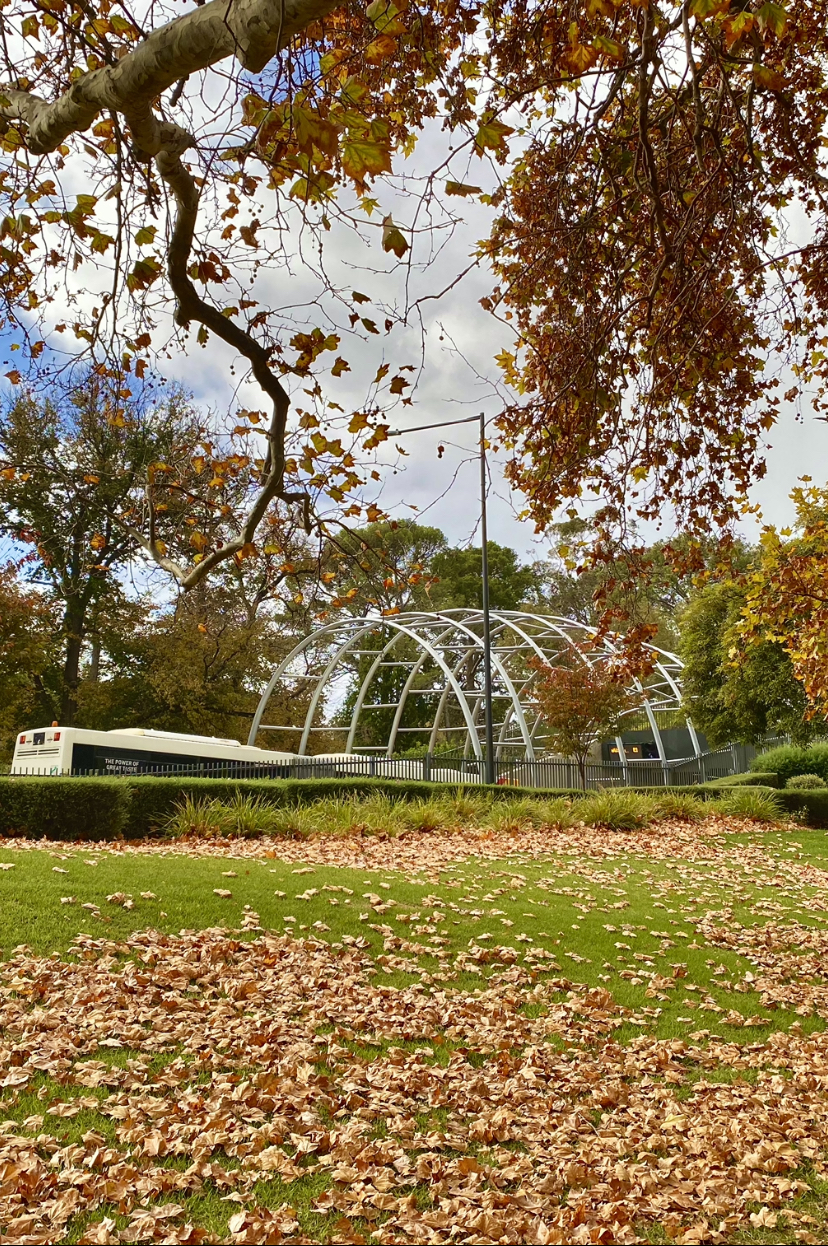
The O-Bahn Busway tunnel passes under Rymill Park and serves the northeastern suburbs.

The Adelaide metropolitan area has one freeway and four expressways. In order of construction, they are:

- The South Eastern Freeway (M1), connects the south-east corner of the Adelaide Plain to the Adelaide Hills and beyond to Murray Bridge and Tailem Bend, where it then continues as National Highway 1 south-east to Melbourne.
- The Southern Expressway (M2), connecting the outer southern suburbs with the inner southern suburbs and the city centre. It duplicates the route of South Road.
- The North-South Motorway (M2), is an ongoing major project that will become the major north–south corridor, replacing most of what is now South Road, connecting the Southern Expressway and the Northern Expressway via a motorway with no traffic lights. As of 2024 the motorway's northern half is complete, connecting the Northern Expressway to Adelaide's inner north-west; the section running through Adelaide's inner west and inner south-west will begin major construction in 2025 with completion estimated for 2031.
- The Port River Expressway (A9), connects Port Adelaide and Outer Harbor to Port Wakefield Road at the northern "entrance" to the metropolitan area.
- The Northern Expressway (Max Fatchen Expressway) (M2), is the northern suburbs bypass route connecting the Sturt Highway (National Highway 20) via the Gawler Bypass to Port Wakefield Road at a point a few kilometres north of the Port River Expressway connection.
- The Northern Connector, completed in 2020, links the North South Motorway to the Northern Expressway.
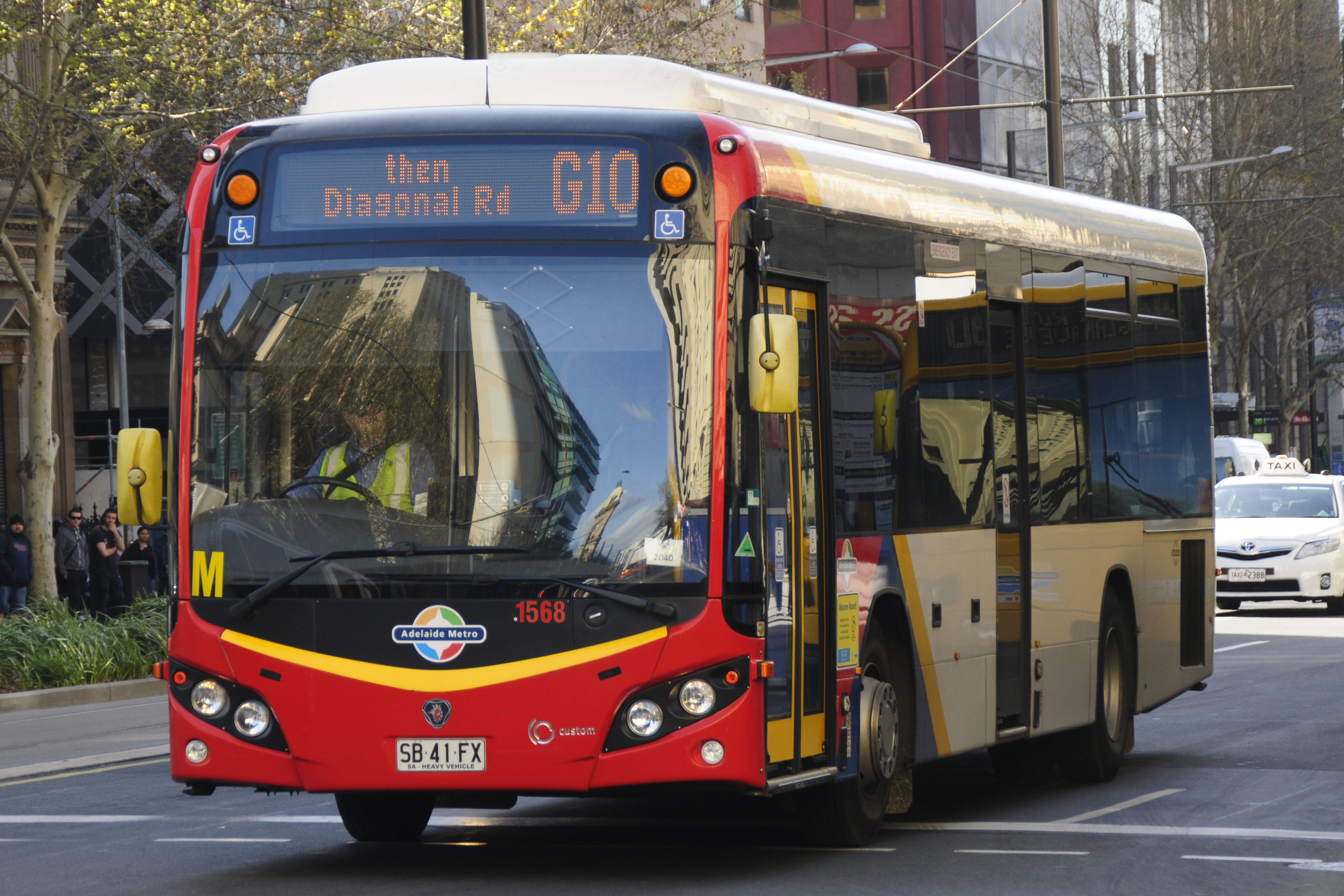
A Custom Coaches bodied Scania bus on King William Street.

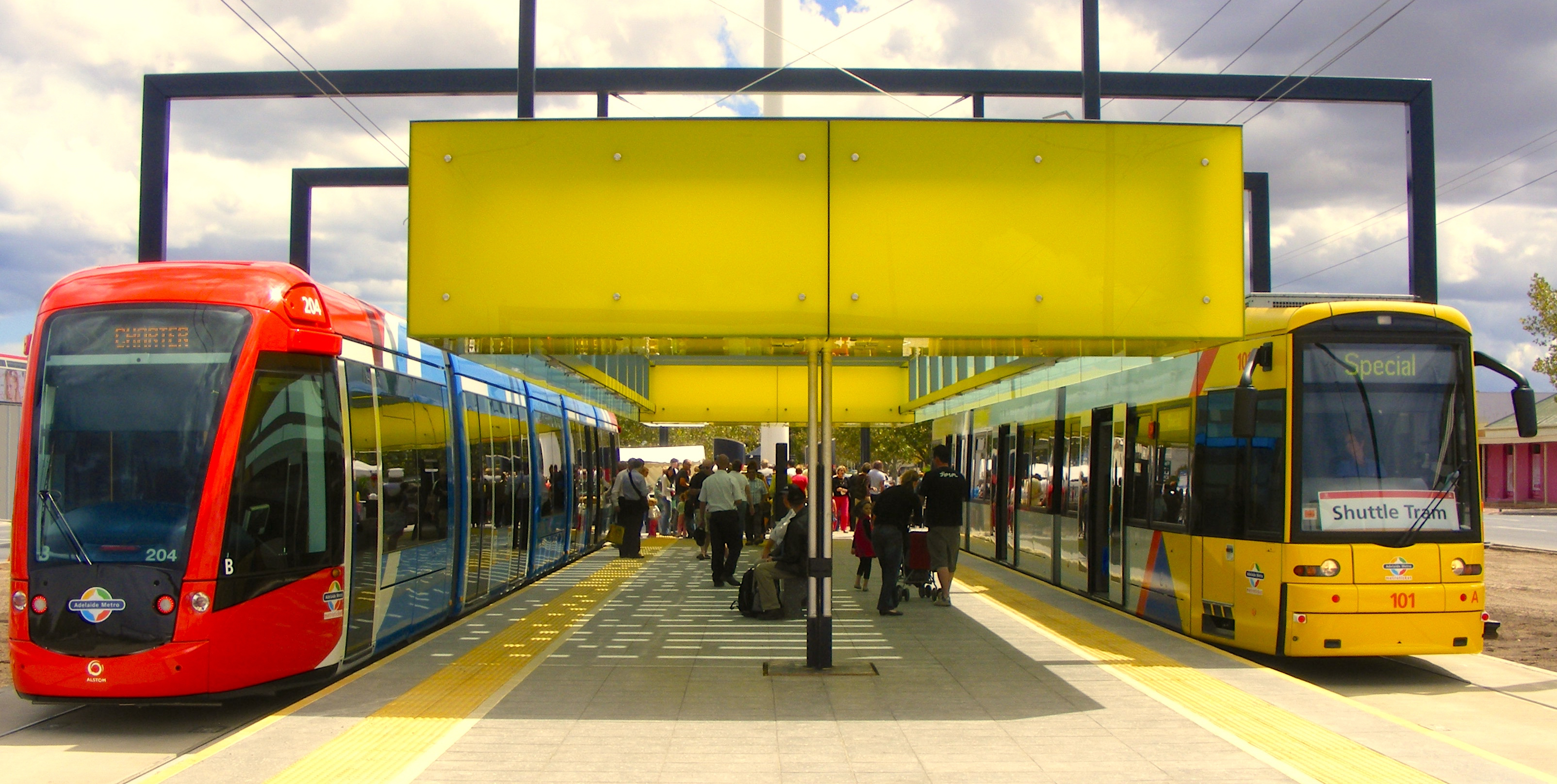
An Adelaide Metro Alstom Citadis and Flexity Classic

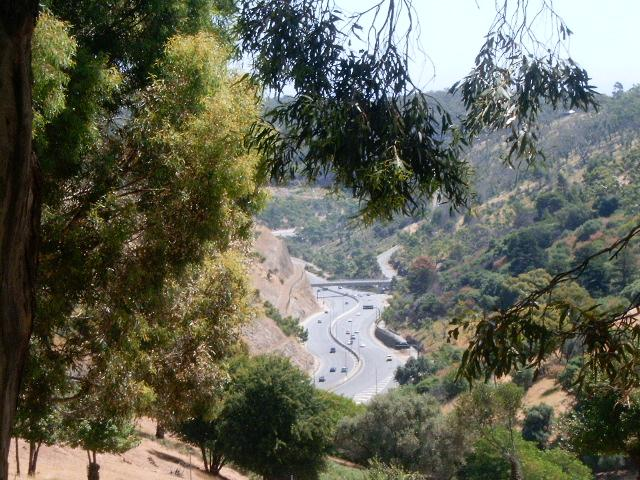
The Mount Osmond Interchange on the South Eastern Freeway; like many cities with urban sprawl, Adelaide has been criticised for car dependency.

==== Airports ====
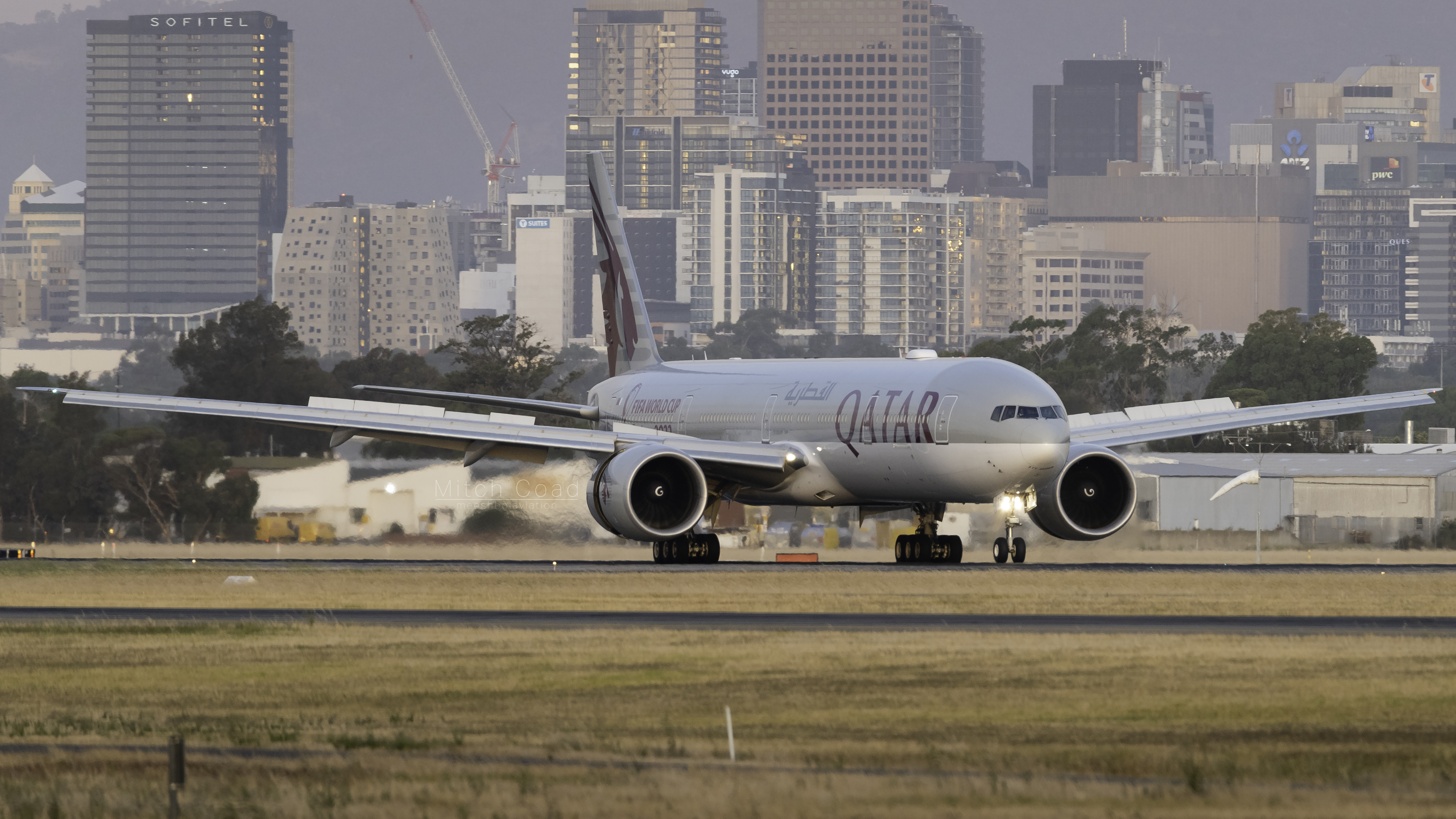
A Qatar Airways plane at Adelaide Airport with the city skyline in the background

The Adelaide metropolitan area has two commercial airports, Adelaide Airport and Parafield Airport. Adelaide Airport, in Adelaide's south-western suburbs, serves almost 9 million passengers annually, with an extensive number of direct flight routes within Australia, as well as other destinations in Oceania, Asia and North America. Parafield Airport, Adelaide's second airport 18 kilometres (11 miles) north of the city centre, is used for small aircraft, pilot training and recreational aviation purposes. Parafield Airport served as Adelaide's main aerodrome until the opening of the Adelaide Airport in February 1955.

Adelaide is also home to a military airport, known as RAAF Base Edinburgh, located in the northern suburbs. It was built in 1955 in a joint initiative with the United Kingdom for weapon development.

=== Health ===
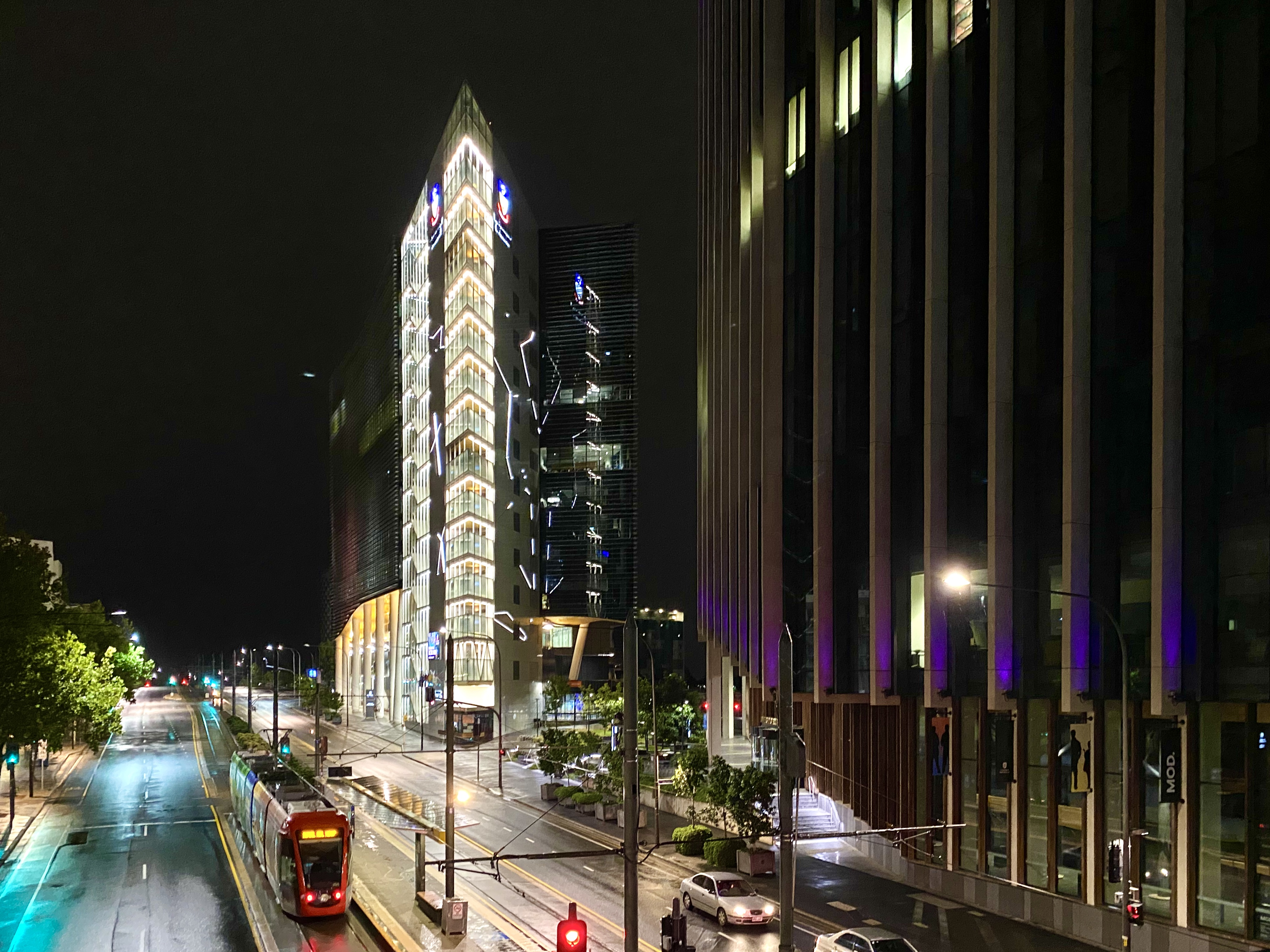
The University of Adelaide Health and Medical Sciences Building, located in the BioMed City precinct on North Terrace

Adelaide's two largest hospitals are the Royal Adelaide Hospital (RAH) in Adelaide Parklands, a teaching hospital affiliated with the University of Adelaide (800 beds), and the Flinders Medical Centre (580 beds) at Bedford Park, affiliated with Flinders University. The RAH also operates additional campuses for specialist care throughout the suburbs including the Hampstead Rehabilitation Centre (150 beds) at Northfield and the Glenside Campus (129 beds) for acute mental health services.

Other major public hospitals are the Women's and Children's Hospital (305 beds), at North Adelaide; the Queen Elizabeth Hospital (340 beds) at Woodville; Modbury Hospital (174 beds) at Modbury; and the Lyell McEwin Hospital (198 beds) at Elizabeth Vale. Numerous private hospitals are also located throughout the city, with the largest operators being not-for-profits Adelaide Community Healthcare Alliance (three hospitals) and Calvary Care (four hospitals).

In 2017, the RAH was relocated from the city's East End to a new AU$2.3 billion facility built over former railyards in the West End. The state-of-the-art hospital forms part of a new biomedical precinct called BioMed City that collocates the South Australian Health and Medical Research Institute (SAHMRI), the University of Adelaide Health and Medical Sciences building, the University of South Australia's Health Innovation Building, and the state's Dental Hospital. SAHMRI, with additional external funding, has built a $300 million second facility completed in 2024, which was intended to house the Australian Bragg Centre with Australia's first proton therapy unit. Construction is underway for the Women's and Children's Hospital to be relocated to the precinct adjacent the RAH by 2030.

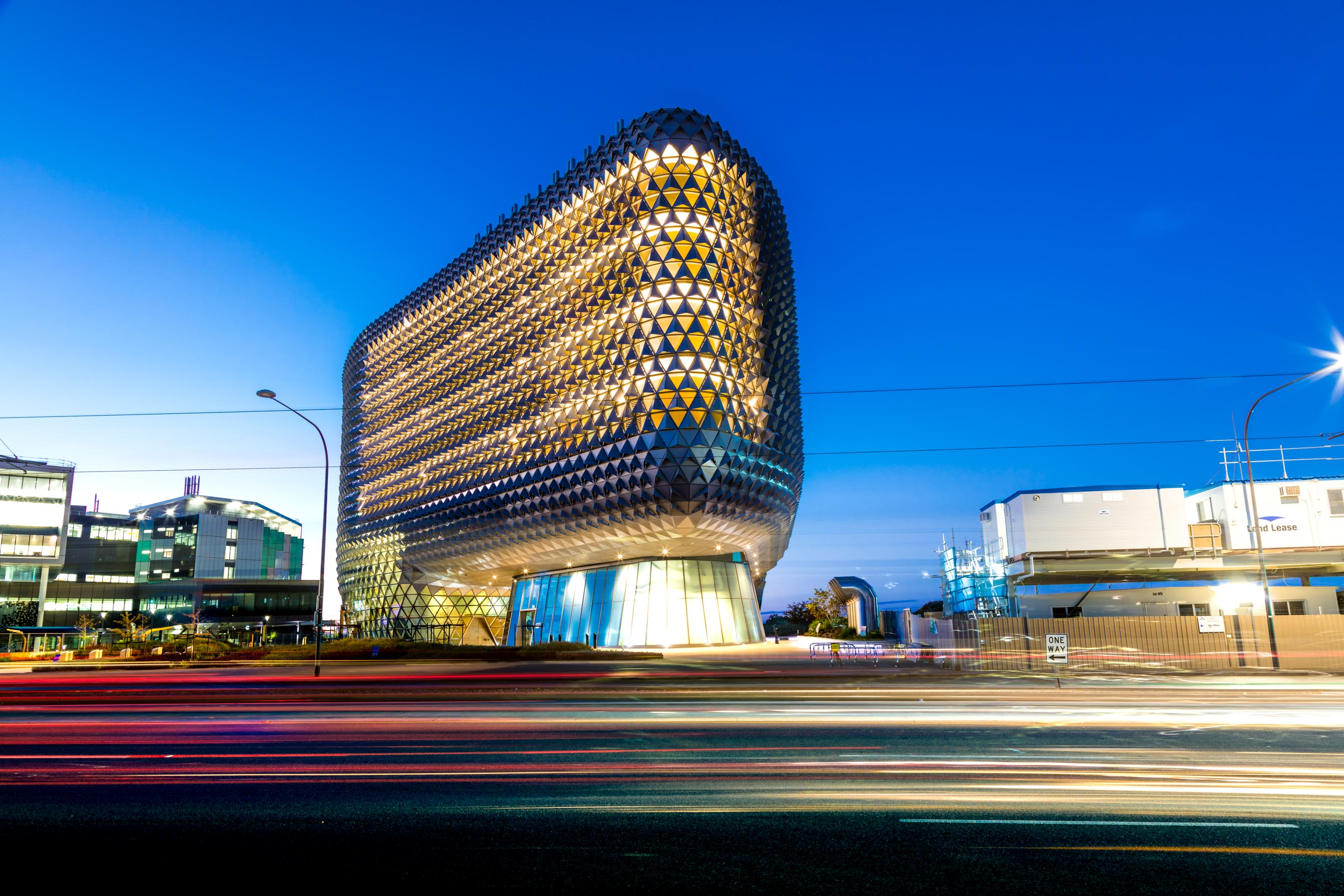
The South Australian Health and Medical Research Institute (SAHMRI), located on North Terrace

The largest provider of community health care within Adelaide is the not-for-profit Royal District Nursing Service, which provides out of hospital care and hospital avoidance care.

=== Energy ===
Adelaide's energy requirements were originally met by the Adelaide Electric Supply Company, which was nationalised by the Playford government in 1946, becoming the Electricity Trust of South Australia (ETSA). Despite significant public opposition and the Labor party's anti-privatisation stance which left the Liberal party one vote short of the numbers needed to pass the legislation, ETSA was privatised by the Olsen Government in 1999 by way of a 200-year lease for the distribution network (ETSA Utilities, later renamed SA Power Networks) and the outright purchase of ETSA Power by the Cheung Kong Holdings for $3.5 billion (11 times ETSA's annual earnings) after Labor MP Trevor Crothers resigned from the party and voted with the government.

The electricity retail market was opened to competition in 2003 and although competition was expected to result in lower retail costs, prices increased by 23.7% in the market's first year. In 2004, the privatisation was deemed to be a failure with consumers paying 60% more for their power and with the state government estimated to lose $3 billion in power generation net income in the first ten years of privatisation. In 2012, the industry came under scrutiny for allegedly reducing supply by shutting down generators during periods of peak demand to force prices up. Increased media attention also revealed that in 2009 the state government had approved a 46% increase in retail prices to cover expected increases in the costs of generation while generation costs had in fact fallen 35% by 2012. South Australia has the highest retail price for electricity in the country.

Privatisation led to competition from a variety of companies who now separately provide for the generation, transmission, distribution and retail sales of gas and electricity. Electricity generation comes from a range of technologies and operators. ElectraNet operates the high-voltage electricity transmission network. SA Power Networks distributes electricity to end users. The largest electricity and gas retailing companies are also the largest generating companies.

The largest fossil fuel power stations are the Torrens Island Power Station gas-fired plant operated by AGL Energy and the Pelican Point Power Station operated by Engie. South Australia also has wind and solar power and connections to the national grid. Gas is supplied from the Moomba Gas Processing Plant in the Cooper Basin via the Moomba Adelaide Pipeline System and the SEAGas pipeline from Victoria.

In 2011, South Australia generated 18% of its electricity from wind power, and had 51% of the installed capacity of wind generators in Australia.

Due to almost universal blackouts within the city during September 2016, the state worked with Tesla to produce the world's largest electricity battery at Hornsdale Power Reserve which has increased that state's electrical security to the extent in which large blackouts are no longer an event.

=== Water ===
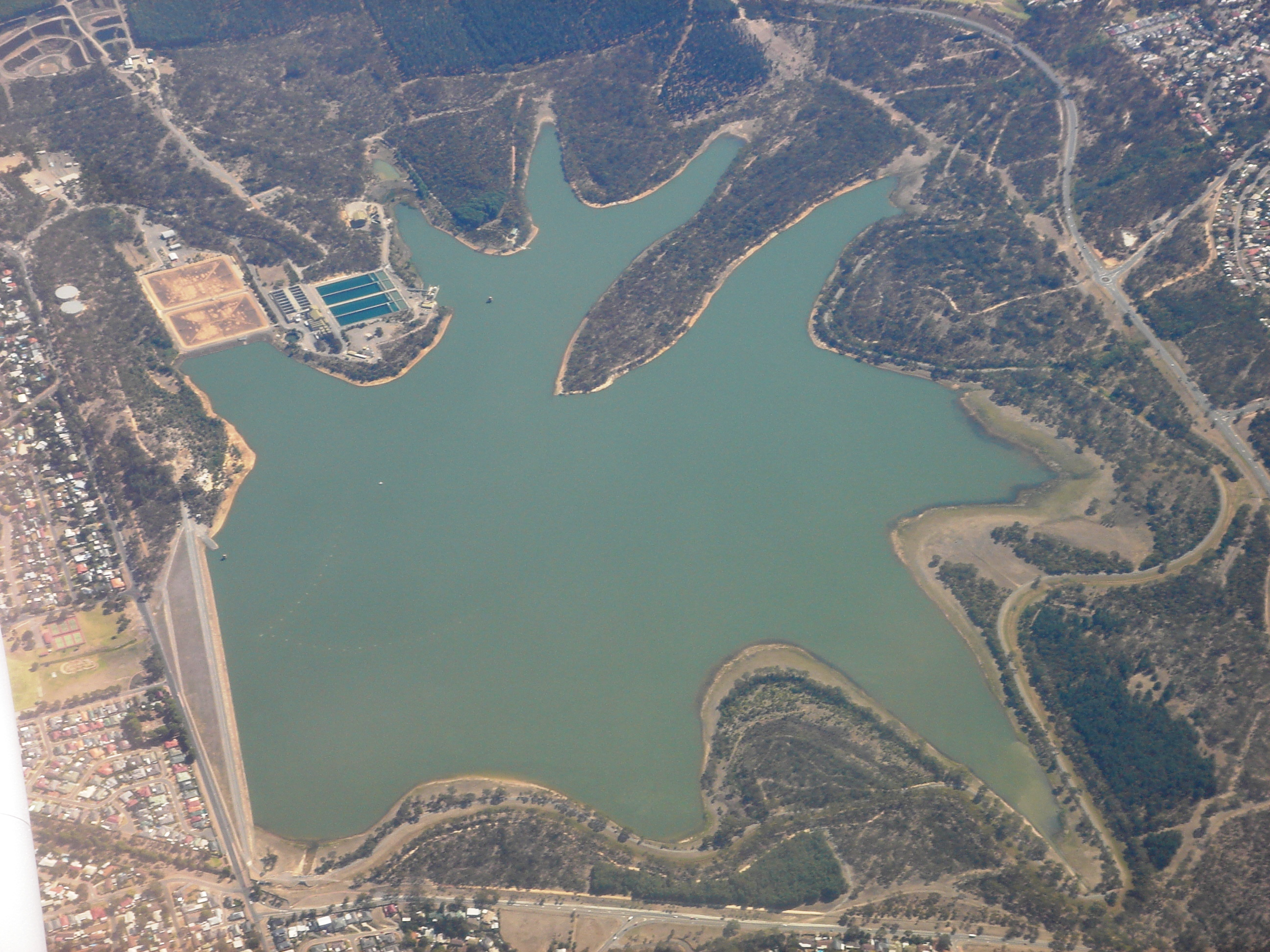
An aerial view of Happy Valley Reservoir, 2007

The provision of water services is by the government-owned SA Water. Adelaide's water is supplied from its seven reservoirs: Mount Bold, Happy Valley, Myponga, Millbrook, Hope Valley, Little Para and South Para. The yield from these reservoir catchments can be as little as 10% of the city's requirements (90GL per annum) in drought years and about 60% in average years. The remaining demand is met by the pumping of water from the River Murray.

A sea-water desalination plant capable of supplying 100GL per annum was built during the 2001–2009 drought; however, it operated at about 8% of its capacity until 2019. In December 2018, the State and Federal Governments agreed to fund a $2m study to determine how the plant could be used to reduce reliance on river water, in an effort to help save the Murray River basin and mouth (including the Coorong) from further ecological damage.

=== Communications ===
AdelaideFree WiFi is a citywide free Wi-Fi network covering most of the inner city areas of Adelaide, primarily the Adelaide CBD and Northern Adelaide precincts. It was officially launched at the Adelaide Central Markets on Tuesday 25 June 2014. It was originally provided by Internode with infrastructure provided by outdoor Cisco WiFi N access points attached to the top of lighting poles, as well as inside cafes and businesses across the city. In 2023, a new agreement was reached between the City of Adelaide and TPG Telecom to replace the network infrastructure, improving network speed and coverage.

=== City of Adelaide ===
The City of Adelaide, was a 10 sail composite (timber planking on a wrought-iron frame) clipper. It was rescued from the mooring where it sank, as HMS Carrick, in Glasgow in 1991. In 2001 it was decided that the ship's name would be reverted to the City of Adelaide, formally renamed in 2013, and arrived in Port Adelaide on 3 February 2014. It was not until June 2024 that the ship was moved from the barge Bradley by Wallbridge Gilbert Aztec (WGA) to the current home on Dock 2, as the centerpiece of a planned village in Port Adelaide's inner harbour. The ship is owned by the Clipper Ship City of Adelaide Ltd (CSCOAL). The STV One and All, a 42-metre two-masted square-rigged brigantine and the ketch The Failie are moored at McLaren Wharf.

== Sister cities ==
The City of Adelaide has been involved in the sister cities movement since 1972. As of 2023 it has long-term international partnership arrangements with five cities, known as sister cities, based on formal agreements between Adelaide and each city. This allows collaboration in the cultural, educational, business, and technical spheres. The five sister cities are:

- Austin, Texas, United States, since 1983
- Christchurch, New Zealand, since 1972
- George Town, Penang, Malaysia, since 1973
- Himeji, Hyogo, Japan, since 1982
- Qingdao, Shandong, China, since 2013

Three cities are known as friendship cities, based on informal partnerships that promote collaboration and a friendly relationship:

- Dalian, Liaoning, China
- Chengdu, Sichuan, China
- Huế, Vietnam

== See also ==
- Music of Adelaide

Lists

- Images of Adelaide
- List of Adelaide obsolete suburb names
- List of Adelaide parks and gardens
- List of Adelaide railway stations
- List of Adelaide suburbs
- List of films shot in Adelaide
- List of people from Adelaide
- List of protected areas in Adelaide
- List of public art in South Australia
- List of public transport routes in Adelaide
- List of South Australian commercial icons
- List of sporting clubs in Adelaide
- List of tallest buildings in Adelaide
- Tourist attractions in South Australia
