= The Land Ironclads =

- Short story by H. G. Wells
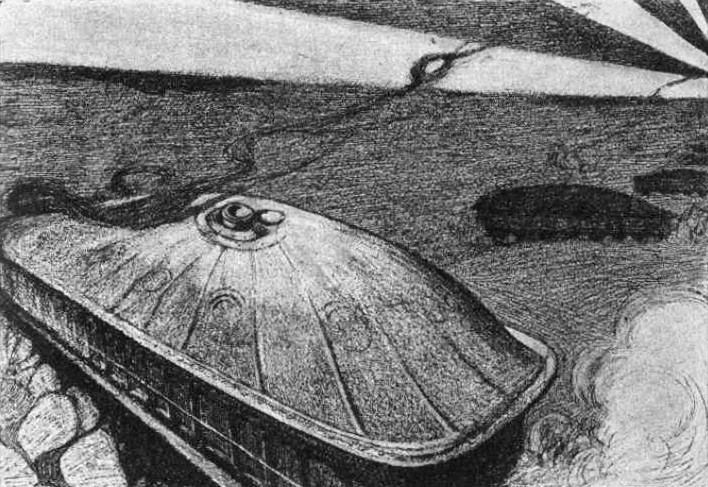
- 1904 illustration of the short story, showing huge ironclad land vessels, equipped with pedrail wheels
- Country: United Kingdom
- Genre: Science fiction

Publication

"The Land Ironclads" is a short story by British writer H. G. Wells, which originally appeared in the December 1903 issue of the Strand Magazine. It features tank-like "land ironclads", 80-to-100-foot-long (24 to 30 m) armoured fighting vehicles that carry riflemen, engineers, and a captain, and are armed with semi-automatic rifles.

== Plot summary ==
The story opens with an unnamed war correspondent and a young lieutenant surveying the calm of the battlefield. They reflect philosophically on the war between two unidentified armies. The time appears to be 1903 and the opponents are dug into trenches, each waiting for the other to attack, of the sort then common and being reported on daily from the Boer War. The men on the war correspondent's side are confident they will prevail, because they are all strong outdoor-types – men who know how to use a rifle and fight – while their enemies are townspeople, "a crowd of devitalised townsmen . . . They're clerks, they're factory hands, they're students, they're civilised men. They can write, they can talk, they can make and do all sorts of things, but they're poor amateurs at war." The men agree that their "open air life" produces men better suited to war than their opponents' "decent civilization."

In the end, however, the "decent civilization," with its men of science and engineers, triumphs over the "better soldiers" who, instead of developing land ironclads of their own, had been practising shooting their rifles from horseback, a tactic rendered obsolete by the land ironclads. Wells foreshadows this eventual outcome in the conversation of the two men in the first part, when the correspondent tells the lieutenant "Civilization has science, you know, it invented and it made the rifles and guns and things you use."

The story ends with the entire contemporary army captured by thirteen land ironclads, with the defenders managing to disable only one. In the last scene, the correspondent compares his countrymen's "sturdy proportions with those of their lightly built captors", and thinks of the press story he is going to write about the experience. He notes that the captured officers are thinking of ways they will defeat tanks with their already-existing weaponry, rather than developing their own land ironclads to counter the new threat. He further notes that the "half-dozen comparatively slender young men in blue pajamas who were standing about their victorious land ironclad, drinking coffee and eating biscuits, had also in their eyes and carriage something not altogether degraded below the level of a man."

== The ironclads ==
The term "ironclad" was coined in the mid-19th century for steam-propelled ocean warships protected by iron or steel armour plates. By the time of Wells' story the notion became a commonplace of boys' literature in the U.S., in popular weekly series such as that published by Frank Reade, and which featured many 'land ironclads' often with different designs each week. Wells' land ironclads are similar to these, described as steam powered and are "essentially long, narrow, and very strong steel frameworks carrying the engines, and borne on eight pairs of big pedrail wheels, each about ten feet in diameter, each a driving wheel and set upon long axles free to swivel around a common axis. [...] the captain [...] had look-out points at small ports all round the upper edge of the adjustable skirt of twelve-inch ironplating which protected the whole affair, and [...] could also raise or depress a conning-tower set above the port-holes through the centre of the iron top cover."

Riflemen are installed in cabins in the "monsters", being "slung along the sides of and behind and before the great main framework". There the men operate what appear to be mechanically targeting, semi-automatic rifles.

== Impact ==
Contemporaries saw Wells' battle between countrymen "defenders" (who rely on cavalry and entrenched infantry) and attacking townsmen as echoing the Boer War, as well as being something of a re-tread of his 1898 novel The War of the Worlds which also featured a struggle between technologically uneven protagonists. But the story served to contribute to Wells' growing reputation as a "prophet of the future", something that many early socialists and newspaper editors were keen to promote, especially when real tanks first appeared on the battlefield 12 years later in 1916.

Wells's story did predict the use of armoured vehicles in combat, but numerous authors (for example Sam Moskowitz in Science Fiction by Gaslight) have mistakenly stated that he also described modern caterpillar treads on a tank and did so before the tank's invention. This is incorrect.

== Inspiration ==
In his later War and the Future (1917), H. G. Wells specifically acknowledges Bramah Diplock's pedrail wheel as the origin for his idea of an all-terrain armoured vehicle in "The Land Ironclads":

The idea was suggested to me by the contrivances of a certain Mr. Diplock, whose "ped-rail" notion, the notion of a wheel that was something more than a wheel, a wheel that would take locomotives up hill-sides and across ploughed fields, was public property nearly twenty years ago.

Indeed, within the story itself the war correspondent, upon his first sight of the machine's pedrails, recalls hearing about them from Diplock in person on a previous journalistic assignment.

According to one biographer, Wells initially had the idea for land ironclads using "pedrails" from an inventor J. W. Dunne, who spoke of "big fat pedrail machines" in a letter to Wells. Dunne later also influenced Wells's novel The War in the Air (1908).

== See also ==
- Landship
- The Land Leviathan – a novel by Michael Moorcock
