= Austral Otis =

Australian engineering company

Austral Otis was a Melbourne engineering works established in 1887 on site of former Langlands foundry in Grant Street, South Melbourne. It was one of the largest manufacturers of elevators in Australia and continued as the Otis Elevator Company.

== Origin ==
The company was initially formed in 1878 as Hughes, Pye & Rigby manufacturing mining plant, steam engines, elevators, wool & other hydraulic presses. It was incorporated as a public company in 1887 as The Austral Otis Engineering and Elevator Company Limited and in October 1893 changed its name to The Austral Otis Engineering Co Ltd. The company epitomised the boom era. It was founded with just £600 in capital, but by the end of the 1880s it employed 300 workers, producing pumping engines, mining machinery, hydraulic lifts and huge steam engines for the city's cable trams and first electric power stations.

Austral Otis tendered the Victorian Government to produce two steam traction engines after starting up in 1880 as a general engineering business, and in the late 1880s it set up a well equipped works for heavy engineering which covered about four acres. It had important agencies for machinery including Worthington pumps and the Otis Bros & Co. elevators. The company undertook many major contracts for mining and other machinery equipment and it was awarded prizes for its steam engines and hoisting equipment at the Melbourne Centennial Exhibition in 1888. It also built steamrollers, but only two examples of these are known in the world.

Herbert Brookes came to Melbourne to improve the management of Austral Otis. He was highly successful and by 1912 was a director of the firm.

== Elevators and steam engines ==
With the development of multi-storeyed iron and steel framed buildings during the skyscraper boom in the 1880s, there was created a demand for fast and reliable passenger lifts such as those of the Otis Elevator Company in the US and Richard Waygood & Co of Britain. With these came the establishment in 1889 of a reticulated hydraulic power system, one of very few in the world at that time. Austral Otis had a substantial part of this market. The company also made steam engines for the Melbourne cable tramway system, for gold mines and sluicing plant, and the Ballarat Woollen Mills. The Melbourne City Building was originally served internally by an early Otis hydraulic lift, while the 1932 Manchester Unity Building has a rare surviving original Otis-Waygood escalator between the ground floor lobby and mezzanine. This was the first building in Victoria to have escalators installed.

== Spotswood pumping station ==
About 1896 the Melbourne & Metropolitan Board of Works (MMWB) sewage pumping station at Spotswood was being built and fitted with large triple expansion steam engines built by Hathorn Davey of Leeds, England, and Thompson & Co Worthington type triple-expansion engines installed at Spotswood between 1895 and 1897. Austral Otis also built an engine for the No. 6 pumping well in 1901.

When the MMBW required additional pumping engines in 1909, Austral Otis were asked to prepare plans for four new engines. While these were based largely on the successful Hathorn Davey design, Austral Otis was able to demonstrate its substantial expertise in steam engineering. The first two new Austral Otis engines were commissioned in June and July 1911, followed by the remaining two in mid-1914.

== Other products ==
When a drought threatened water supply for Melbourne's gardens, the Dight's Falls Pumping Station located just below the tail race of the mill at Dight's Falls was erected in 1890 with 150 horsepower engines from Austral Otis.

As part of its pavilion at the New Zealand & South Seas Exhibition, Austral Otis erected a timber tower 40m high, which included an elevator that travelled about 30 m. It was estimated to have cost about £1200 and was known as New Zealand's Eiffel Tower.

The Queenscliff lifeboat shed included a slipway with roller, channel, keelway and cradle supplied by the Austral Otis Engineering Co.

An unusual piece of large machinery constructed by the Austral Otis company was Big Lizzie, built for the Mount Gunson copper mine around 1912 when they needed a super heavy truck to handle swamps and to ford small rivers. It was fitted with Frank Bottrill's dreadnaught wheels which he patented in 1906. Some of the McDonald's tractors also had these wheels. The truck did not leave Melbourne for Mount Gunson South Australia until 1916.

A unique contract was for the No 1 rail grinder, built in 1929 for the Melbourne & Metropolitan Tramways Board, which was used to smooth tramway tracks.

Another large contract was for a dragline excavator for use in the newly opened brown coal fields of the State Electricity Commission in the Latrobe Valley, which followed a plant for making briquettes in 1893–94, for the Great Morwell Coal Mining Company near what is now Yallourn North.

== Demise ==
The Food Machinery & Chemical Corporation of USA acquired a controlling interest in the business on 30 July 1948 and Austral Otis became a subsidiary of the American company. Its name was subsequently changed in September 1952 to Food Machinery (Australia) Ltd. The Austral Otis name and company thereafter ceased to exist.

A two-storey brick building originally constructed in 1888 as the headquarters for Austral Otis Elevator and Engineering Company Limited survives at the corner of Kavanagh Street and Kingsway, Southbank, Melbourne. Although adapted for other uses and modified in detail, both internally and externally, the building retains its original general appearance.

== Engineers ==
A number of prominent engineers and manufacturers gained their start in the industry at Austral Otis. These include:

- Charles Ernest Ruwolt, (1873–1946) engineer and industrialist who worked at a number of foundries before starting his own Vickers Ruwolt
- Ellis Harvey Davies, (1882–1942) engineer and wartime public servant served an apprenticeship with Austral Otis Engineering Co. Ltd.
- Marshall Thomas Wilton Eady (1882–1947) engineer at Austral Otis before joining his uncle's firm.
- Arthur William Murphy (1891–1963) engineer and airman worked in several engineering establishments.
- Herbert Brookes, (1867–1963) businessman, pastoralist, public official and philanthropist became a director of Austral Otis Engineering Co. Ltd.
- Sir Harold Winthrop Clapp (1875–1952), railway administrator, served his apprenticeship in 1893–95 Austral Otis.
