= McPherson's =

Australian hardware firm

McPherson's Pty Ltd was an Australian hardware firm, for many years a leading merchant of woodworking and metal-working machinery.

== Foundation ==
Thomas McPherson (c. 1823 – 27 December 1888), who had a home "Dudley House" at 142 Dudley Street, West Melbourne, founded an ironmongery business in 1860, at 149 Spencer Street, Melbourne. Merchandise carried included bells, lathes, horseshoes, and steam engines. The business suffered a severe setback in the depression of the 1890s, but was able to honor all its debts and avoid insolvency. He was mayor of Melbourne 1870–1871. He was married to Jessie McPherson, née Fulton (c. 1823 – 27 June 1901). Three sons survived childhood:

- Hunter Kerwin McPherson (1851 – July 1932) was independently successful as a businessman in Sydney.
- Edward Clayhills McPherson (1863 – 16 November 1896) He inherited his father's business along with his younger brother —
- William Murray McPherson (19 September 1865 – 22 March 1929) inherited the business on the death of their father. He had a notable career in politics. He was treasurer of Victoria 1917–1923 and knighted in 1923. He was Premier of Victoria 1928–1929 and a noted philanthropist.

William Murray McPherson became sole proprietor in 1896 after Edward killed himself by gunshot but it was not until 1898 that the business name was changed – to Thomas McPherson and Son.

In 1908 the business was operating from premises at 582–588 Collins Street, Melbourne.

In 1913, having embarked on a career in politics, he restructured the business as a private company, McPherson's Pty Ltd.

== Development ==
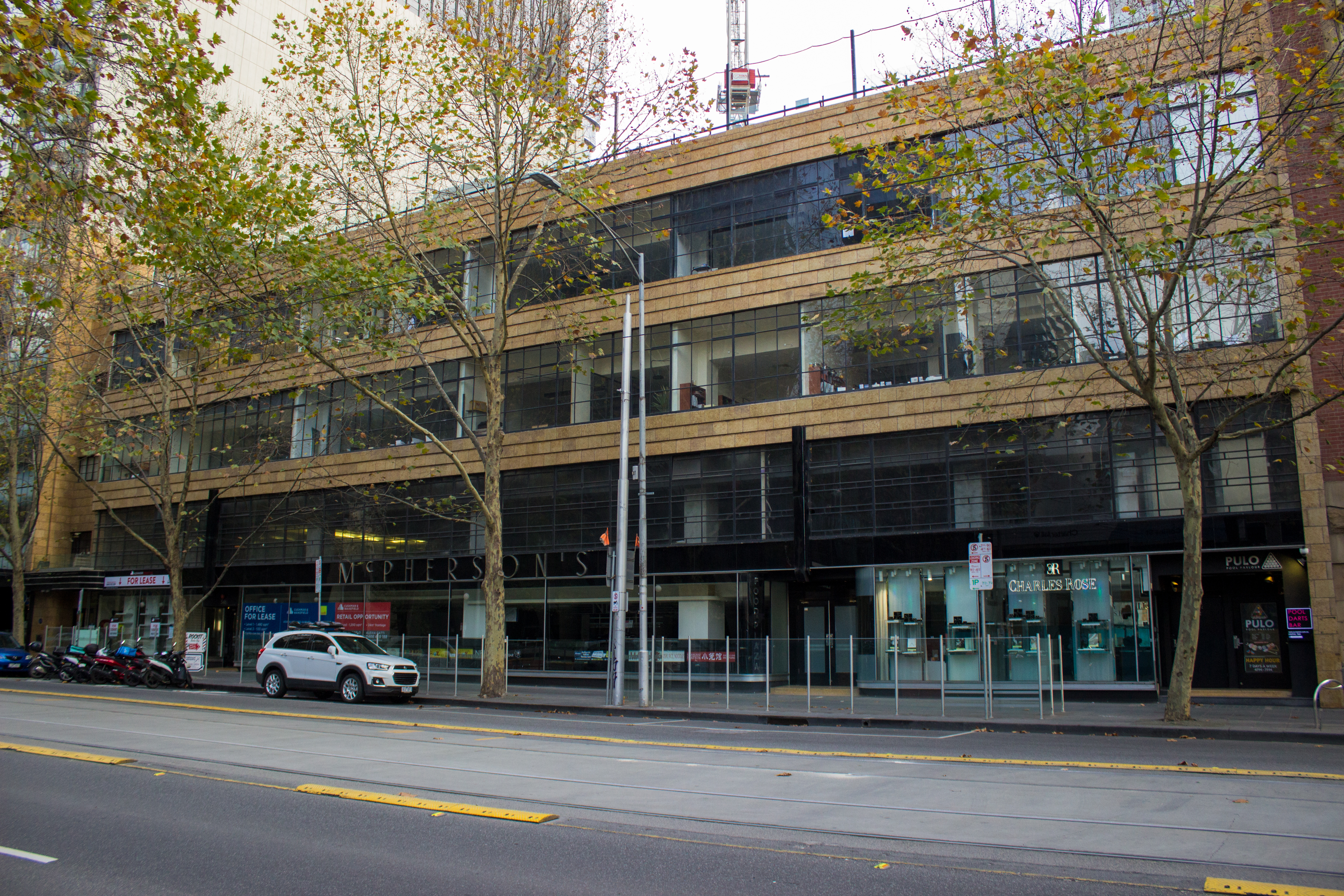
Collins Street frontage

By 1917 the Collins Street premises was augmented by the addition of 554–566 Collins Street. Freehold on this property was finalized in 1946, also a property on Jeffcott Street, West Melbourne, by which time the company also had factories in Tottenham, Kensington and Richmond, Victoria.

In 1937 the company purchased 76 acres (31 ha) at Sunshine, adjacent to the Serviceton railway line.

By 1946 the company had controlling interests in several Australasian industries, including Ajax Bolt and Rivet Pty Ltd of New Zealand (established in 1939), F. W. Hercus Manufacturing Co. Ltd, manufacturers in South Australia of lathes, guillotines and other heavy machinery; also of Patience and Nicholson (P & N), manufacturers in Maryborough, Victoria, of twist drills and thread-forming tools; also Wiltshire Files on Sunshine Road, Tottenham, manufacturing files and rasps.

=== The catalogue ===
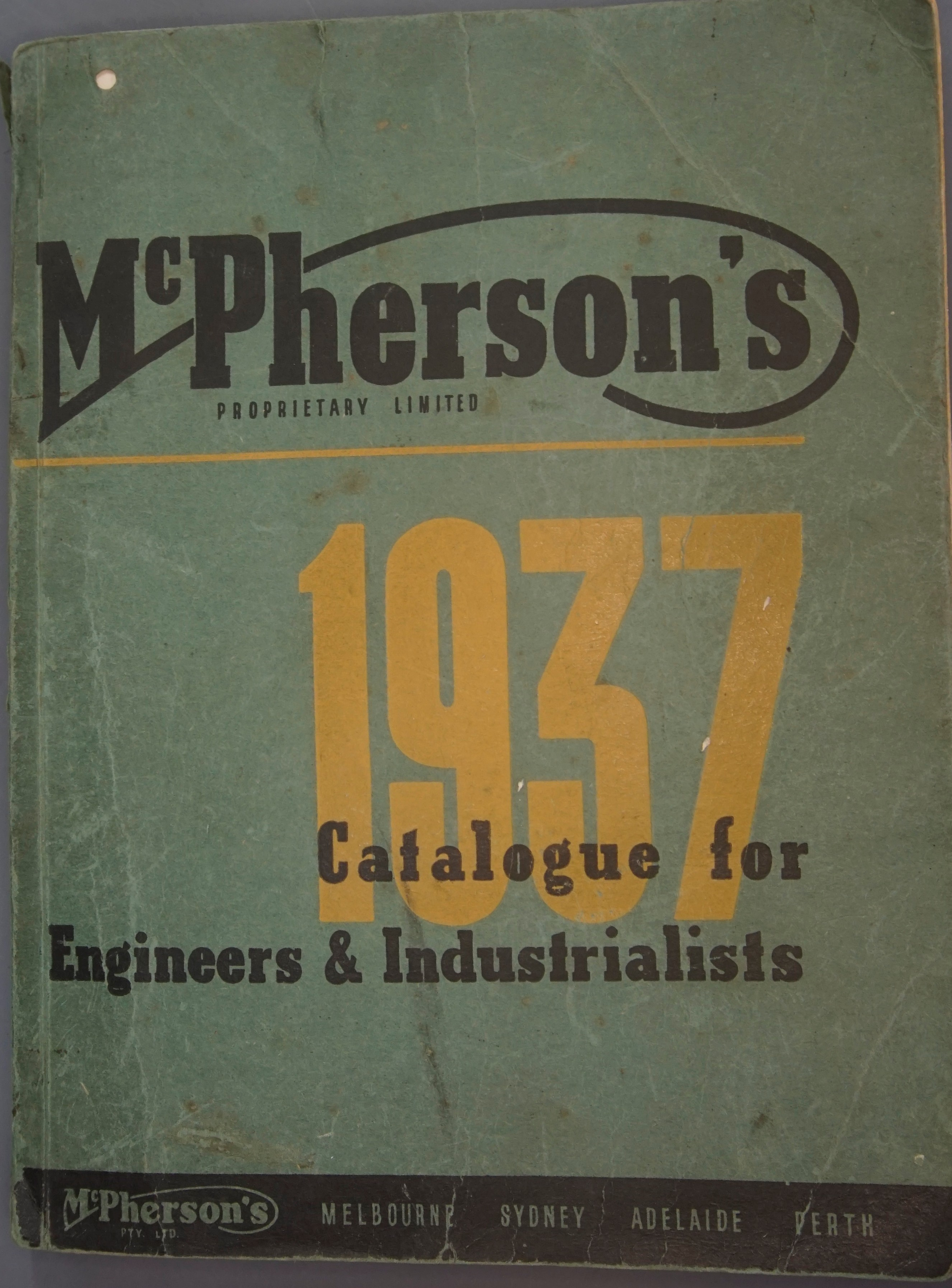
McPherson's catalogue 1937

A key promotional tool for the company was its catalogue, extensively detailed with prices, available free of charge to farmers and other businesses. In 1908 it had 148 pages. By 1937 it had grown to 372 pages, The 1960 catalogue, of which a copy is held by Museums Victoria, had 510 pages.

=== People ===
William Murray McPherson married Emily Jackson on 19 May 1892. Emily was a daughter of Sydney merchant William Marshall Jackson, managing director of Lassetter and Co. They had one son and two daughters

- William Edward McPherson (12 December 1898 – 17 January 1950).

Oliver James Addison (died 13 June 1947) was managing director of McPherson's from

In 1935 W. E. McPherson was governing director (later termed chairman); O. J. Addison, managing director; with Marshall Eady and K. C. Bainbridge, directors.

== Expansion ==
=== New South Wales ===
In September 1913 Acme Machine Tool Company at 51–65 Bathurst Street, Sydney, became a branch of McPherson's Proprietary Limited.

McPherson's claimed to have supplied, from their own manufacture, all five million rivets (some 3,500 long tons (3,600 t)) used in building the Sydney Harbour Bridge. By 1946 the company also had a factory in Alexandria.

=== South Australia ===
The company built a new store and showrooms on 102–130 Waymouth Street, Adelaide (bisected by Gilles Arcade), having demolished a row of houses and part of Shannon's Horse Bazaar, previously known as Queen's Theatre.

=== Western Australia ===
At first McPherson's product line was available to Perth customers through Burkett's Agencies

Showrooms and offices were at 532–534 Murray Street, Perth. A factory which the company established at Bayswater for local manufacture of nuts and bolts proved uneconomical due to unavailability of cheap labour, and closed in 1940.
