= Frank Bottrill =

Australian blacksmith and inventor

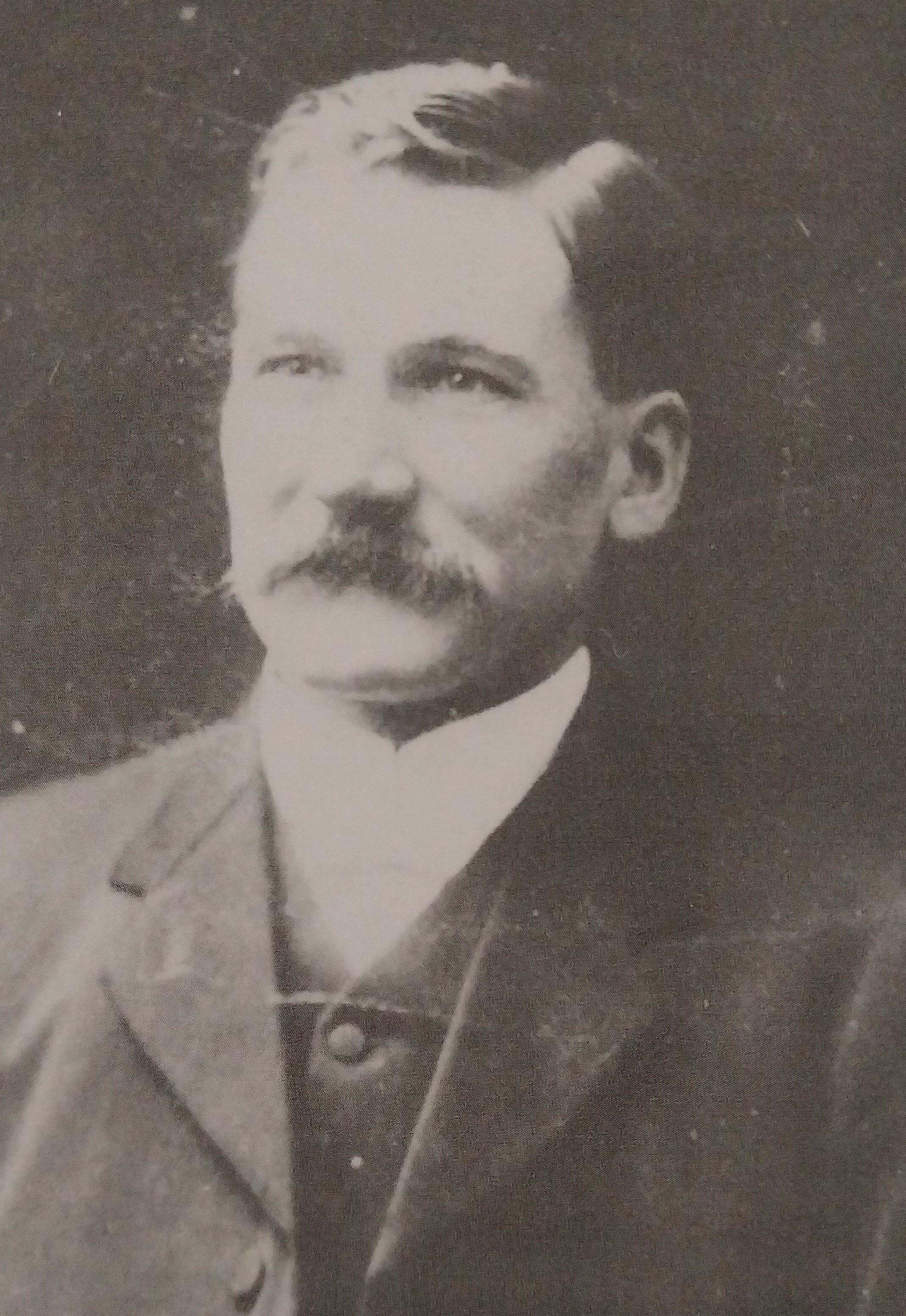
- Frank Bottrill.
- Born: 1 April 1871; Sturt, Adelaide, Australia
- Died: 7 January 1953 (aged 81); Mildura
- Occupations: Blacksmith, inventor
- Known for: "Big Lizzie" traction engine

Frank Bottrill (1 April 1871 – 7 January 1953) was an Australian blacksmith and inventor, known for his giant "Big Lizzie" traction engine, thought to be at one time the largest in the world. It had a unique variant of the Dreadnaught Wheel design. Alternating bearing plates gave support to each wheel, allowing it to travel over soft ground without bogging down. This was an early attempt to solve the problem that was later addressed more effectively by the caterpillar track. After running into financial difficulty, Bottrill spent the later part of his working life clearing bush and hauling loads in the west of New South Wales and Victoria. Big Lizzie has been preserved, and stands in a park in Red Cliffs, Victoria.

== Early years ==
Frank Bottrill was born on 1 April 1871 into a Methodist family in Sturt, Adelaide. His father, John Lucas Bottrill, was a market gardener. His mother was Eliza Bottrill, née Macklin. He apprenticed as a blacksmith, and worked in the Moonta and Wallaroo mines in South Australia, qualifying as a steam engine driver. He moved to Broken Hill, New South Wales, around 1889. In an early venture, Bottrill formed a steam-engine company to transport supplies to Broken Hill and set out from Adelaide with his first vehicle. The engine became bogged down in the sand north of Morgan, to the north of the Murray River, and had to be abandoned.

By 1896 Bottrill had returned to East Payneham in Adelaide and was working there as a blacksmith. He submitted a patent application in September 1896 for improvements to the design of windmills. Frank Bottrill and his brother Reuben (born 1877) were hired to clear bush in Tintinara, South Australia, in the early 1900s.

== Engineer and inventor ==
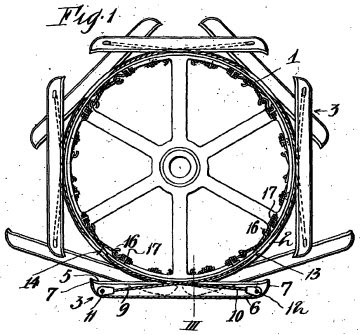
Illustration from Bottrill's 1912 patent filing in the United Kingdom

In 1846 James Boydell had obtained a patent in Britain for a steam traction engine with "Dreadnaught Wheels", where each wheel had hinged plates attached loosely at regular intervals around the outside of the rim. Each plate in turn would lie flat on the ground as the wheel rolled over it, providing better support in muddy or sandy ground. Bottrill heard of Boydell's system, and in 1906 filed a patent for an improved design. He used crossed wire ropes to attach the "bearer" shoes to the wheel rims. The plates alternated on each side of the rim, which was split, to give a smoother ride. Bottrill's "Dreadnaught" or "Ped-rail" patent was approved on 6 September 1907. He installed his dreadnaught wheels on two McLaren steam traction engines between 1906 and 1910.

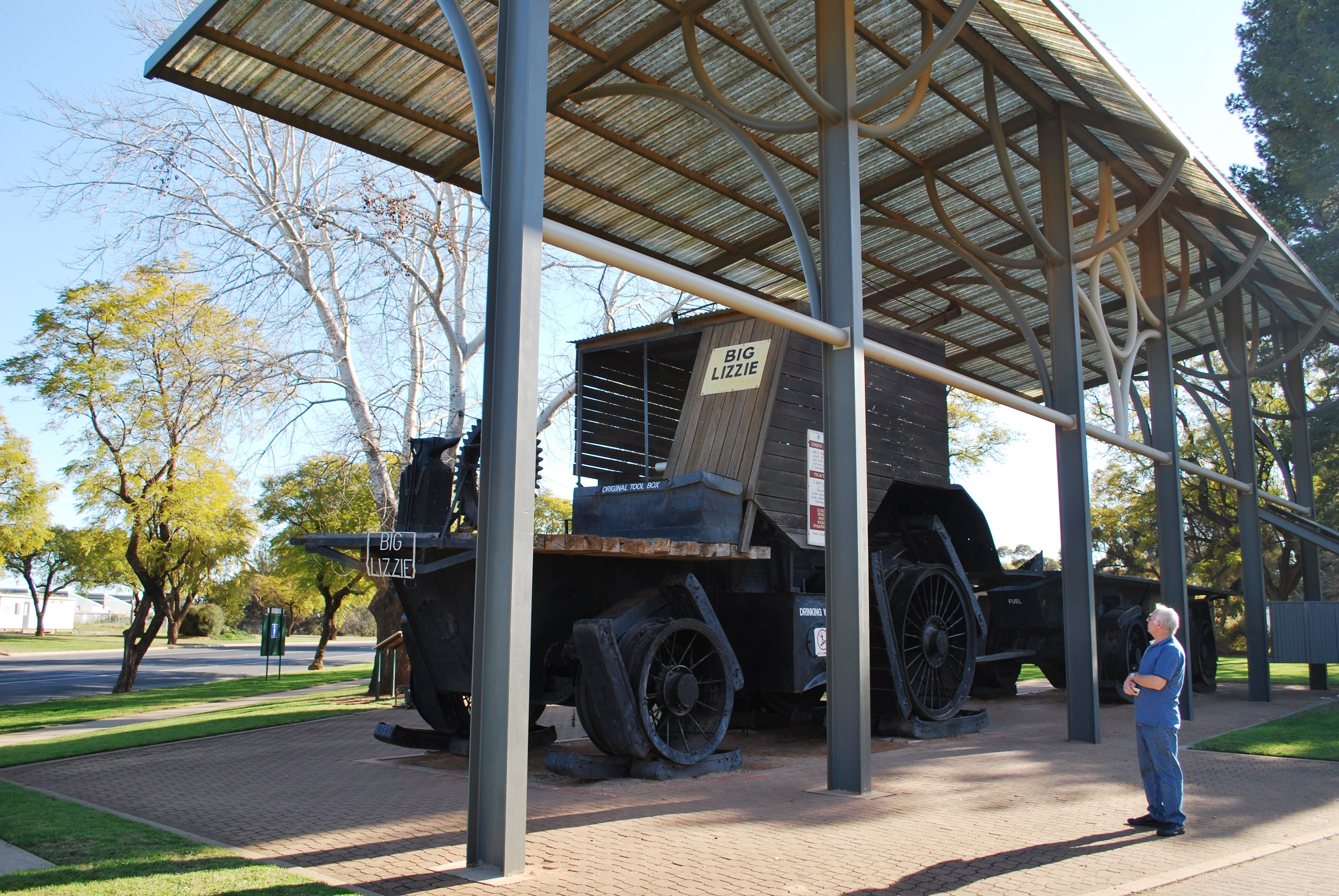
"Big Lizzie" on 14 August 2009 at Red Cliffs, Victoria, Australia

Bottrill moved to Victoria in 1908, and joined the Seventh-day Adventist Church in Ballarat. On 31 March 1909 he married Margaret Young, a bible worker with the church. Bottrill moved to South Melbourne, where he collaborated with the A. H. McDonald company as an engineer as well as a blacksmith. The Mount Gunson copper mines in South Australia bought the first set of Dreadnaught wheels on a tractor built by Austral Otis with a forty-horsepower twin-cylinder McDonald engine. It was tested in swampy land near the Austral Otis works in August 1911, then dismantled and shipped to Hummock Hill (now Whyalla), where Frank and Reuben Bottril re-assembled the tractor and drove it to Port Augusta, South Australia.

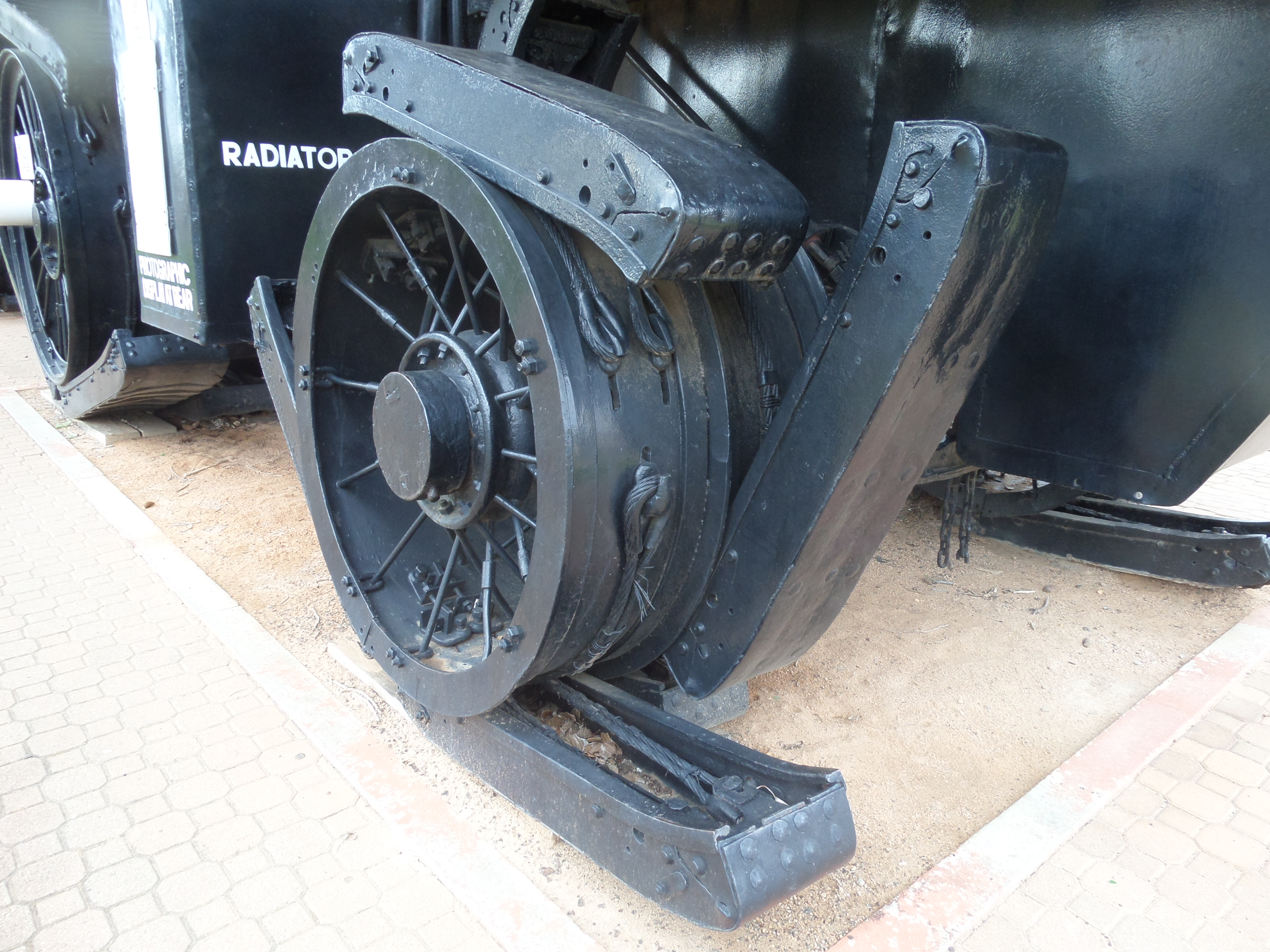
Dreadnaught Wheel on 'Big Lizzie', one of a pair of smaller wheels.

For a while Bottrill's pedrails were offered as an optional feature by McDonald's on their farm and industrial tractors. They were used on tractors in Cloncurry, Queensland, mines. In 1913 McDonald's won contracts to build two tractors with pedrails for Commonwealth Railways, who were building a section of the Trans-Australian Railway across the Nullarbor Plain. Reuben Bottrill brought the tractors into operation. He wrote to his brother,

When at the 132 miles [mark] I had an inch of rain to contend with and at the time it came on there were two large claypans (like glue) and a salt lake to contend with too – directly in front of me. For the next two days I travelled only four miles, but I got past the claypans and lake and got into heavy sand with the one mile gear on all the time for about 12 miles. The last three days of return trip I did 13.17 and 15.5 miles respectively. I think this tractor has proved itself very suitable to the Com' during this trip, especially after getting past those gluepots with an inch of rain there. (Note: The tractors worked well on the railway construction job, used to haul equipment and material that had to be carried in advance of the railhead. Once the job was done, it seems that they were abandoned where they stood.)

Bottrill's patented wheels were also used on "Big Lizzie", a huge traction engine which McDonald's built to his design in 1915. (Note: Big Lizzie had a Blackstone single-cylinder engine that delivered 60 horsepower at 275 rpm, running on a mix of diesel and crude oil. It was cooled by water, and had an exhaust-induced airflow "radiator" that Bottrill had designed. The 7 feet (2.1 m) diameter flywheel weighed three tons, and the entire engine weighed eight tons. The tractor was 34 feet (10 m) long, 11 feet (3.4 m) wide and 18 feet (5.5 m) high. Big Lizzie included a blacksmithy and anvil mounted on the foredeck. The total weight was 45 tons.) Big Lizzie could carry almost 90 tons when two trailers were attached. There were just six bearers on each wheel, compared to Bottrill's earlier designs which had as many as twelve bearers. This placed more strain on the cables retaining the bearers, and had the effect of reducing the tractor's speed to one mile per hour. Big Lizzie was awkward to manoeuvre, with a turning radius of 200 feet (61 m).

== Later years ==
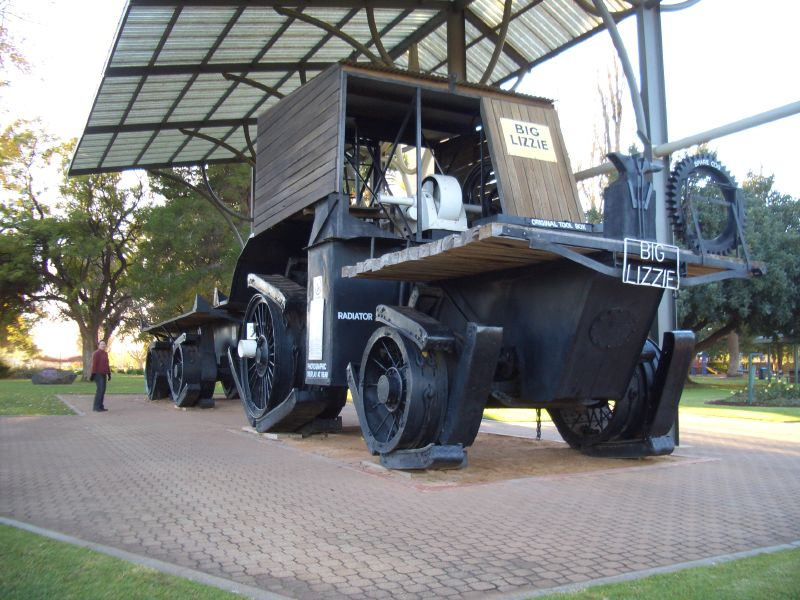
"Big Lizzie" in 2006

Bottrill planned to drive Big Lizzie to the Broken Hill mines, with two pedrail-equipped wagons in tow. He left Melbourne early in 1916, taking his family with him. He travelled at a maximum speed of 1 mph, going off road where bridges were not strong enough or the road bends were too sharp. The tractor broke through a bridge near Kilmore. The Campaspe River was flooded, and it took three weeks to remove snags and build earthworks before a crossing was possible near Elmore. The Murray River could not be crossed at Echuca as planned since the river was flooded and Bottrill was not allowed to take the tractor into the town over the approach bridge. Bottrill reached Kerang in January 1917, where he spent five months working on improvements. He reached Ouyen in August 1917 and Mildura in October 1917. After a journey of 21 months, he found that the Murray was flooded and impassable.

Urgently needing work, Bottrill began taking on contracts to haul wheat and clear bush in the area. He was to continue with this work for the rest of his working life. From 1920 to 1924 Bottrill worked in Red Cliffs, in the Rural City of Mildura, clearing the ground for a 6,000 hectares (15,000 acres) irrigated farming settlement for World War I veterans. Up to 16 men helped attach cables to trees and stumps which Big Lizzie then hauled out. After this job was over, Bottrill drove Big Lizzie to Western Victoria to continue clearing land.

He lived near Balmoral, Victoria, from 1926 to 1931, and from 1926 to 1928 cleared land at the nearby Glendinning station. However, disputes arose with the station owners, one being due to the fact that Bottrill would not work on Saturday, considered to be the Sabbath by his church. He sold out in 1928, reluctantly abandoning Big Lizzie. Bottrill lived in Lismore near Camperdown, Victoria from 1931 to 1934, then moved to Dareton, New South Wales, near Mildura, where he was an elder of the church and the treasurer for the rest of his life. He died on 7 January 1953 at Mildura. Despite all the frustrations, Bottrill was never known to drink, swear or lose his temper.

Big Lizzie stood idle for many years. The Blackstone engine was sold in 1938, powered stone crushing equipment at Pyramid Hill until 1942 and was scrapped in 1945. Big Lizzie was recovered and brought to Red Cliffs in 1971. She is now displayed in Barclay Square on the Calder Highway. Visitors may listen to a recording that tells the history of the machine.
