= Front-engine, four-wheel-drive layout =

Automotive configuration

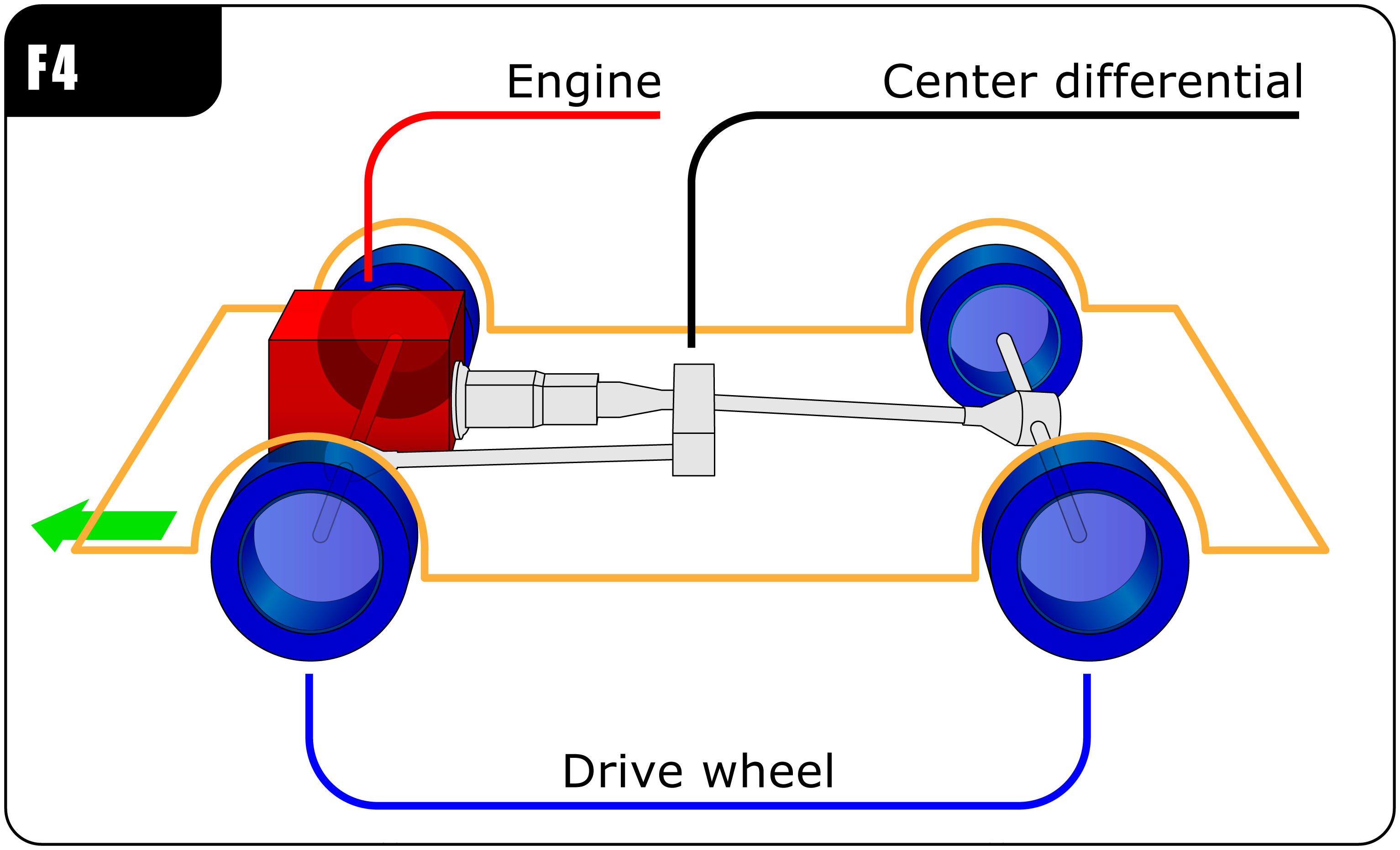
F4 layout

In automotive design, an F4, or front-engine, four-wheel drive (4WD) layout places the internal combustion engine at the front of the vehicle and drives all four roadwheels. This layout is typically chosen for better control on many surfaces, and is an important part of rally racing, as well as off-road driving.

== History ==
The first origins of it were introduced in the 1820s from steam coach builders Burstall & Hill. This was then re-created by many other manufactures, such as "British engineer Joseph Diplock patented a four-wheel-drive system for a traction engine, while in Vienna, Austria, Ferdinand Porsche developed an electric vehicle that also had all wheels driven, with an electric motor at each corner, as early as 1899". This layout is designed for off-road vehicles to have the most traction in strenuous situations without losing too much cargo space at the same time. However, the 1903 Spyker 60 HP was the first car built with an F4 drive layout.

== Implementation ==
Most four-wheel-drive layouts are front-engined and are derivatives of earlier front-engine, rear-wheel drive (longitudinal engine which has more balanced weight distribution for better handling, such as the BMW X5), or front-engine, front-wheel drive designs (traverse engine which makes for a more compact powertrain which allows for more passenger room, like the Acura MDX).

Several four-wheel-drive vehicles have been built without a drive shaft between the front combustion engine and rear wheels; instead the rear wheels receive power and torque from a rear electric motor. This setup has been mainly used by hybrid electric vehicles, although some conventional vehicles had also adopted the system.

This layout is the drive train of choice for off-road pickup trucks and SUVs. It allows these vehicles to get the most traction without sacrificing cargo or passenger room. Part-time four-wheel drive vehicles frequently have a transfer case and no center differential, meaning, in many cases, the 4WD mode does not allow any difference in front and rear axle speeds. For normal road driving, these vehicles are shifted into 2WD mode, to prevent damage to the transfer case. Full-time four-wheel drive systems, on the other hand, cannot do without some kind of center differential. The purpose of four-wheel drive is to maintain optimal traction when manually selected. A vehicle has four-wheel drive when the front and rear driveshafts can be locked together to move at the same speed and send the same amount of torque to all four wheels.

In terms of racing purposes, whether it be on-road or off-road, can be described as follows,

A team that pursues the Weak LS4WD architecture will minimize the development cost of the front-wheel drive system at the expense of having a larger rear powertrain. The Weak architecture produces a vehicle with a large powersplit between the front and rear powertrains, while the Strong architecture recommends a vehicle with more similar power and torque requirements for the front and rear.

== Examples ==
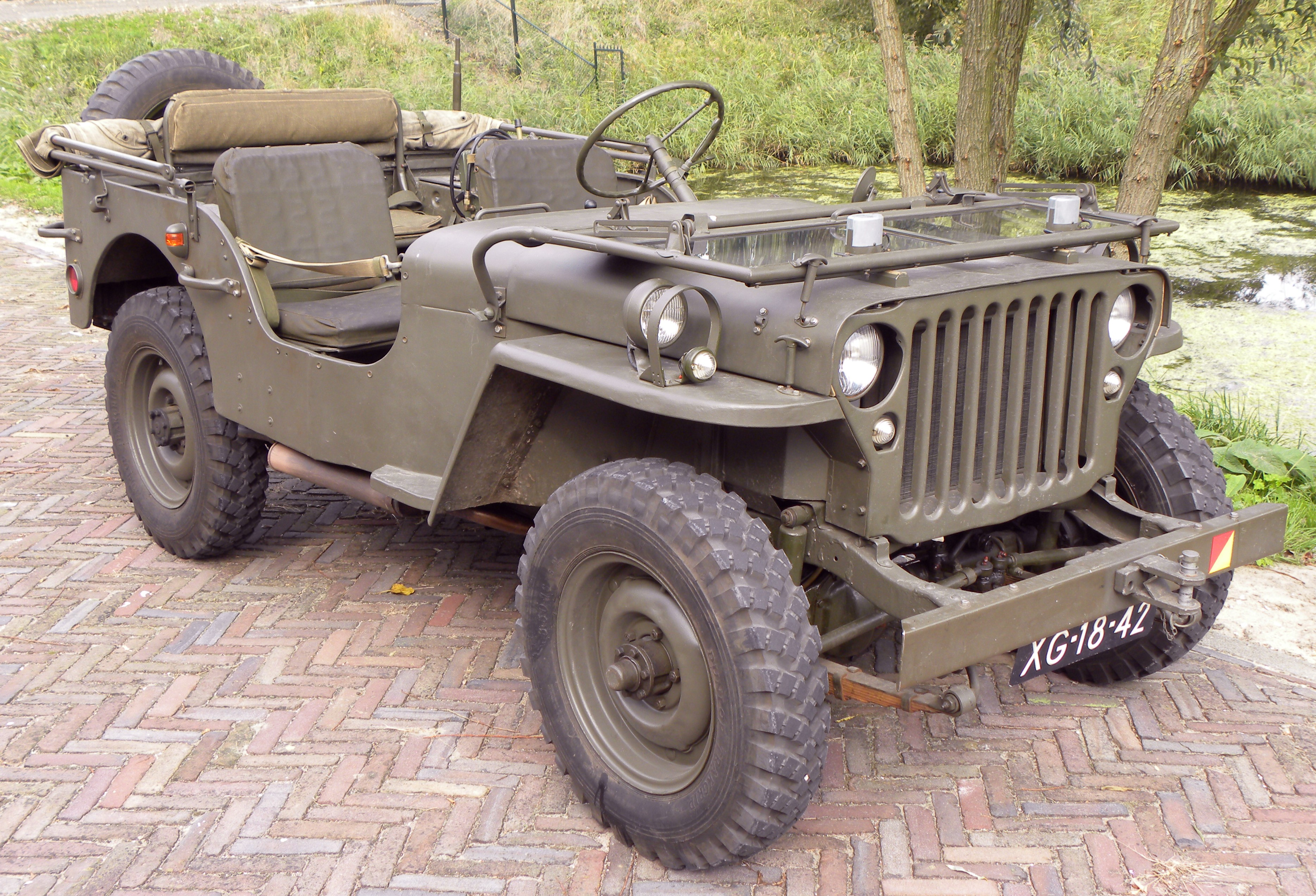
1943 Willys Jeep

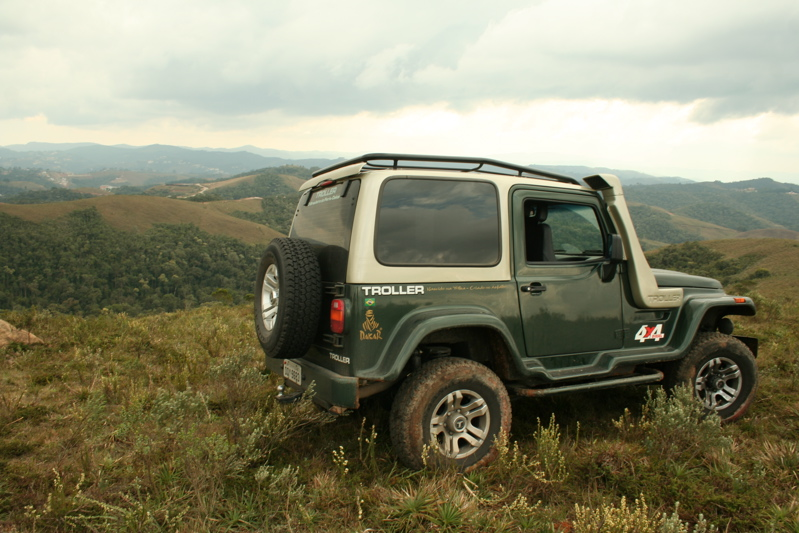
A Troller T4 jeep

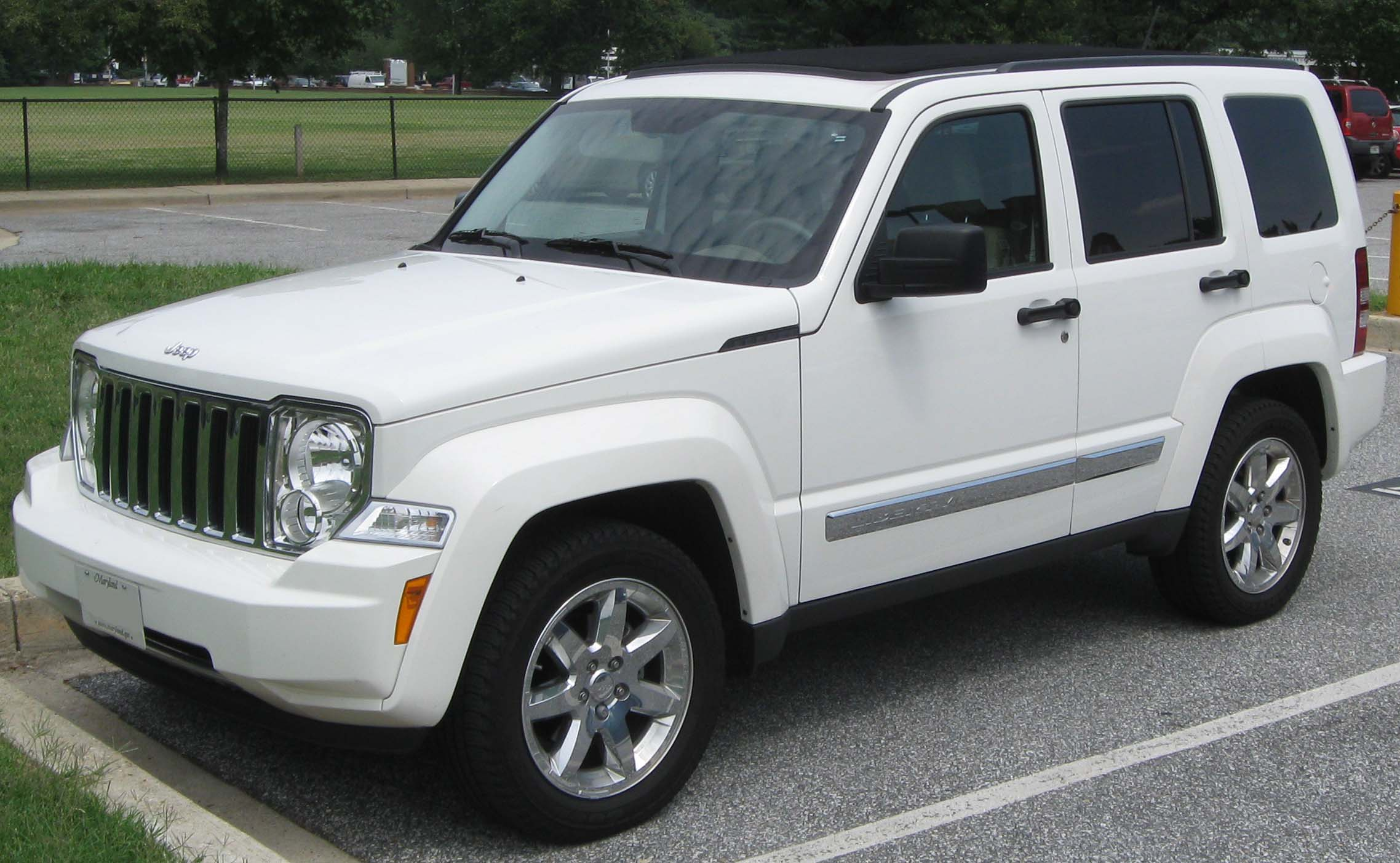
2008–2009 Jeep Liberty

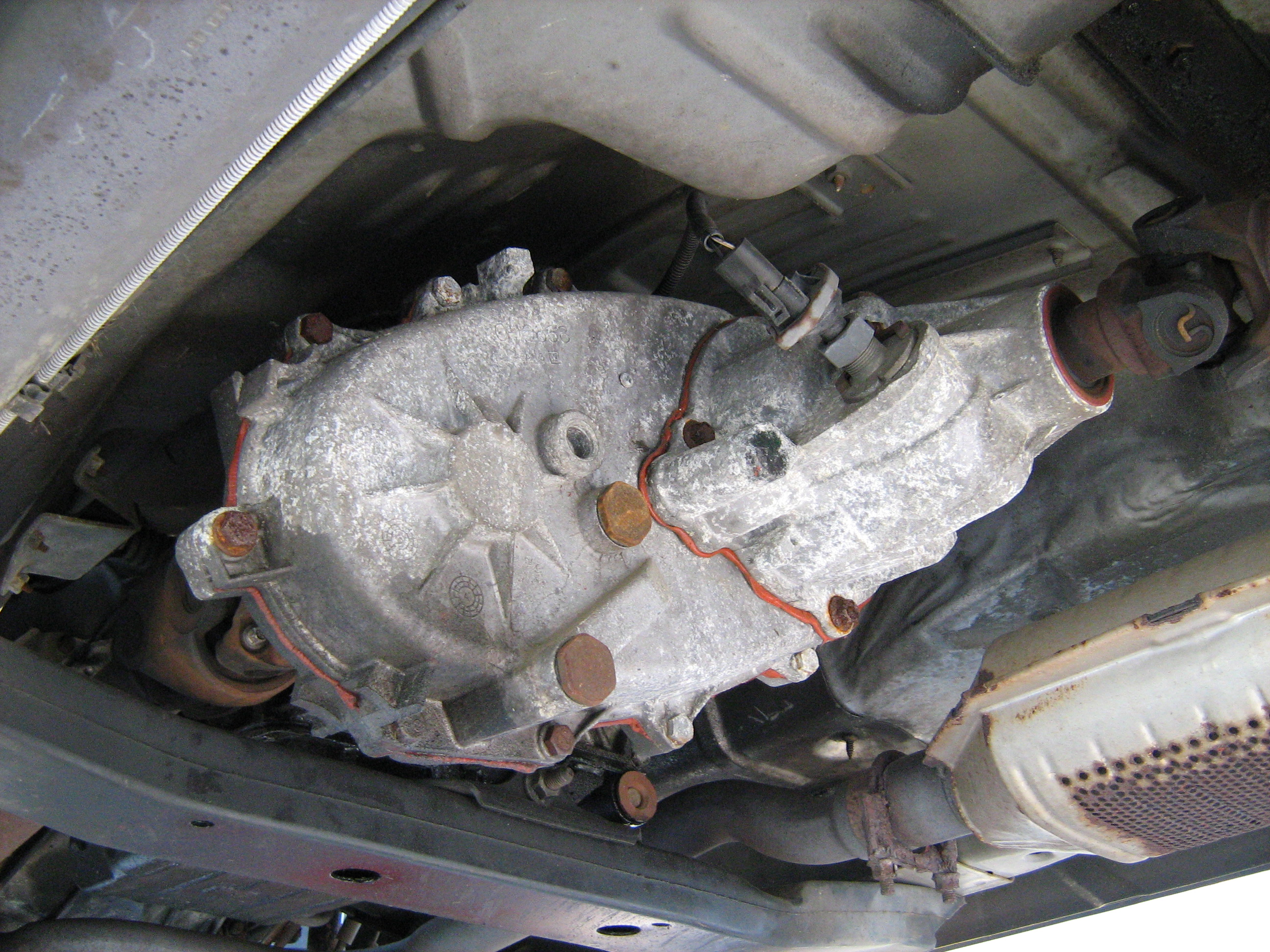
Center transfer case sending power from the transmission to the rear axle (right) and front axle (left)

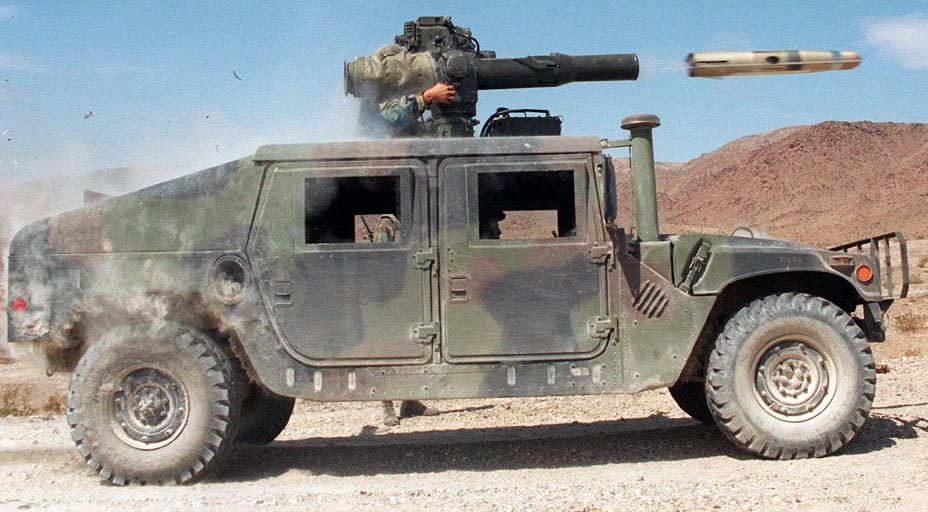
The HMMWV is a 4WD/AWD that powers all wheels evenly (continuously) via a manually lockable center differential, with Torsen differentials for both front and rear.

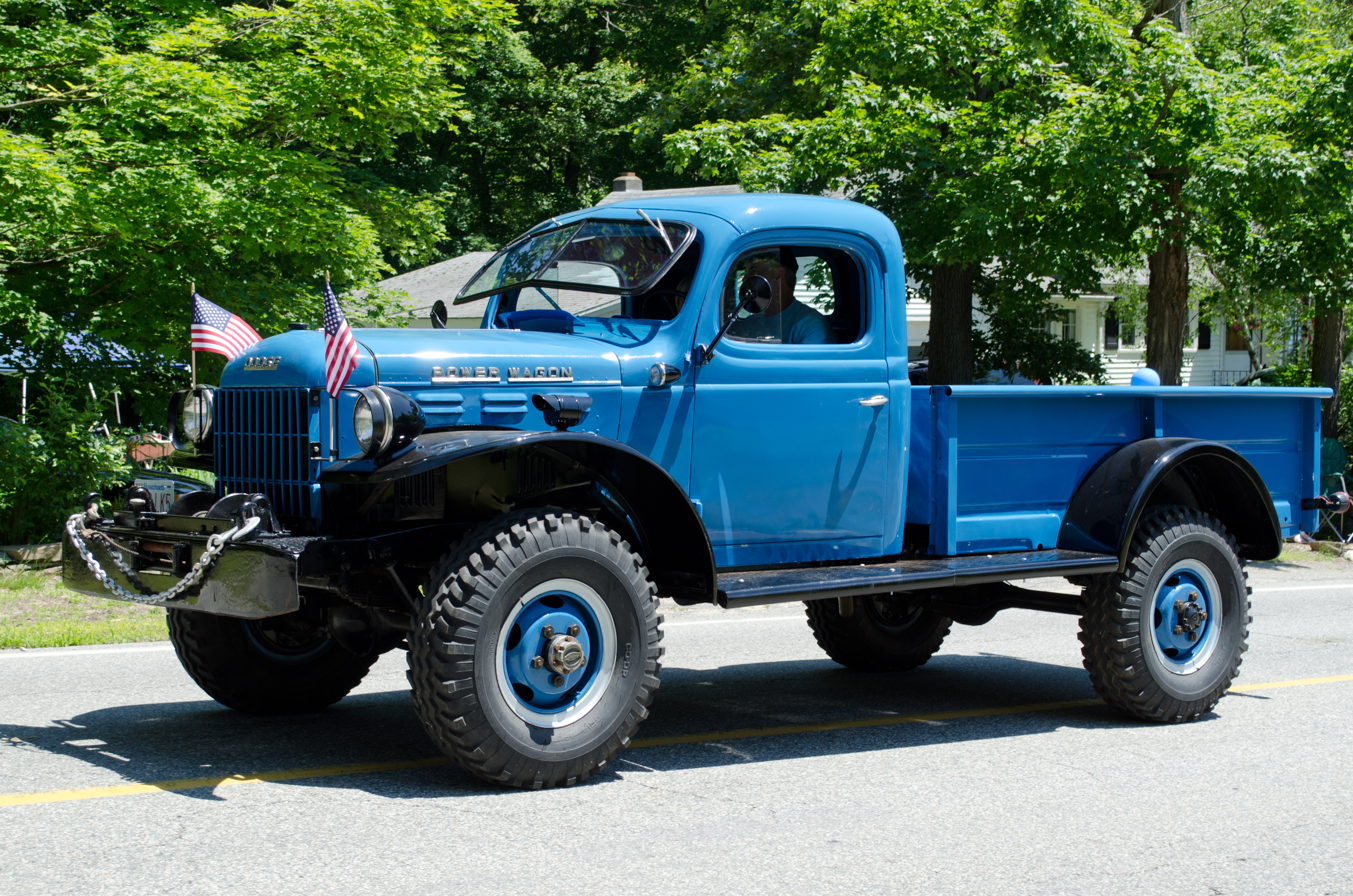
First-generation Dodge Power Wagon

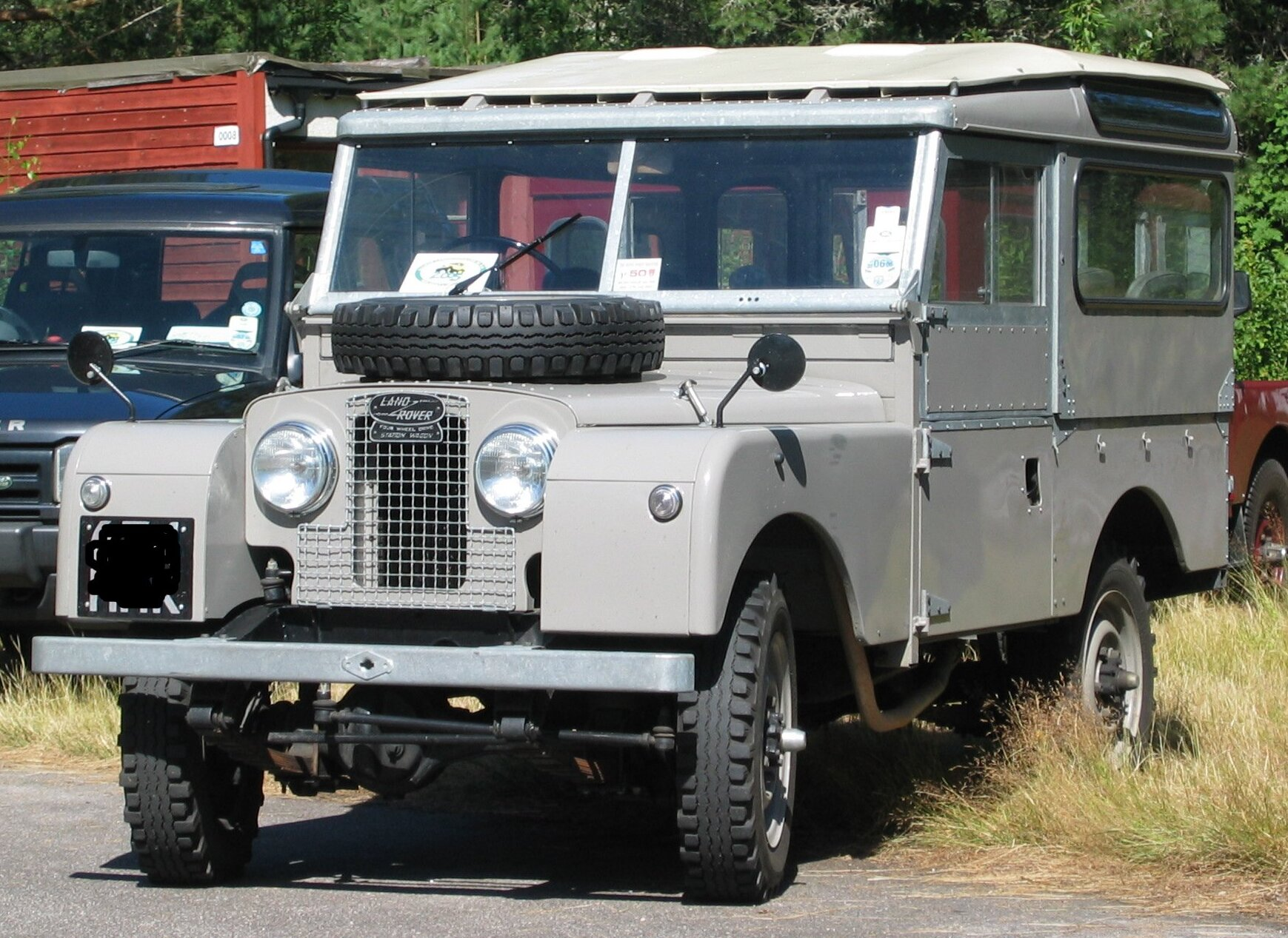
Land Rover Series I

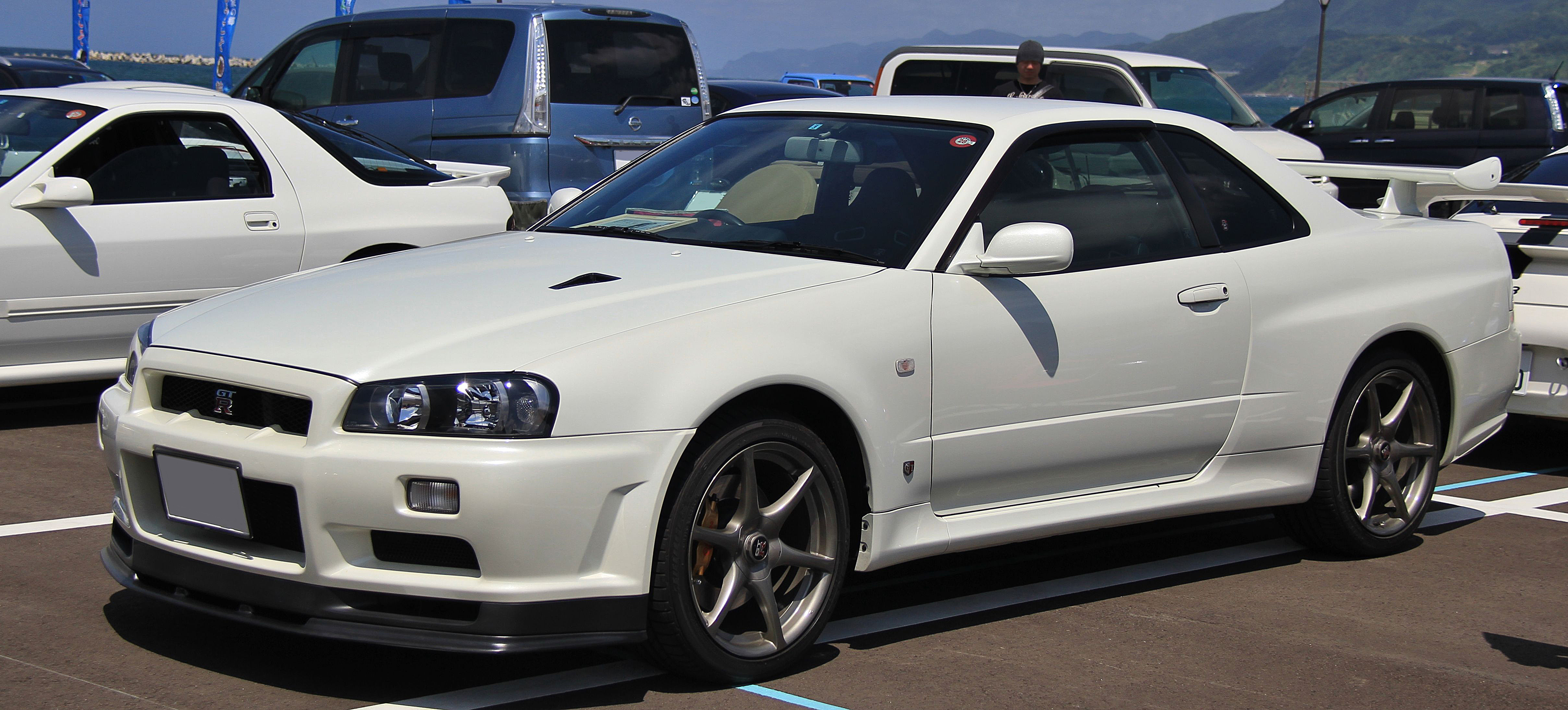
Nissan Skyline GT-R V Spec II (BNR34)

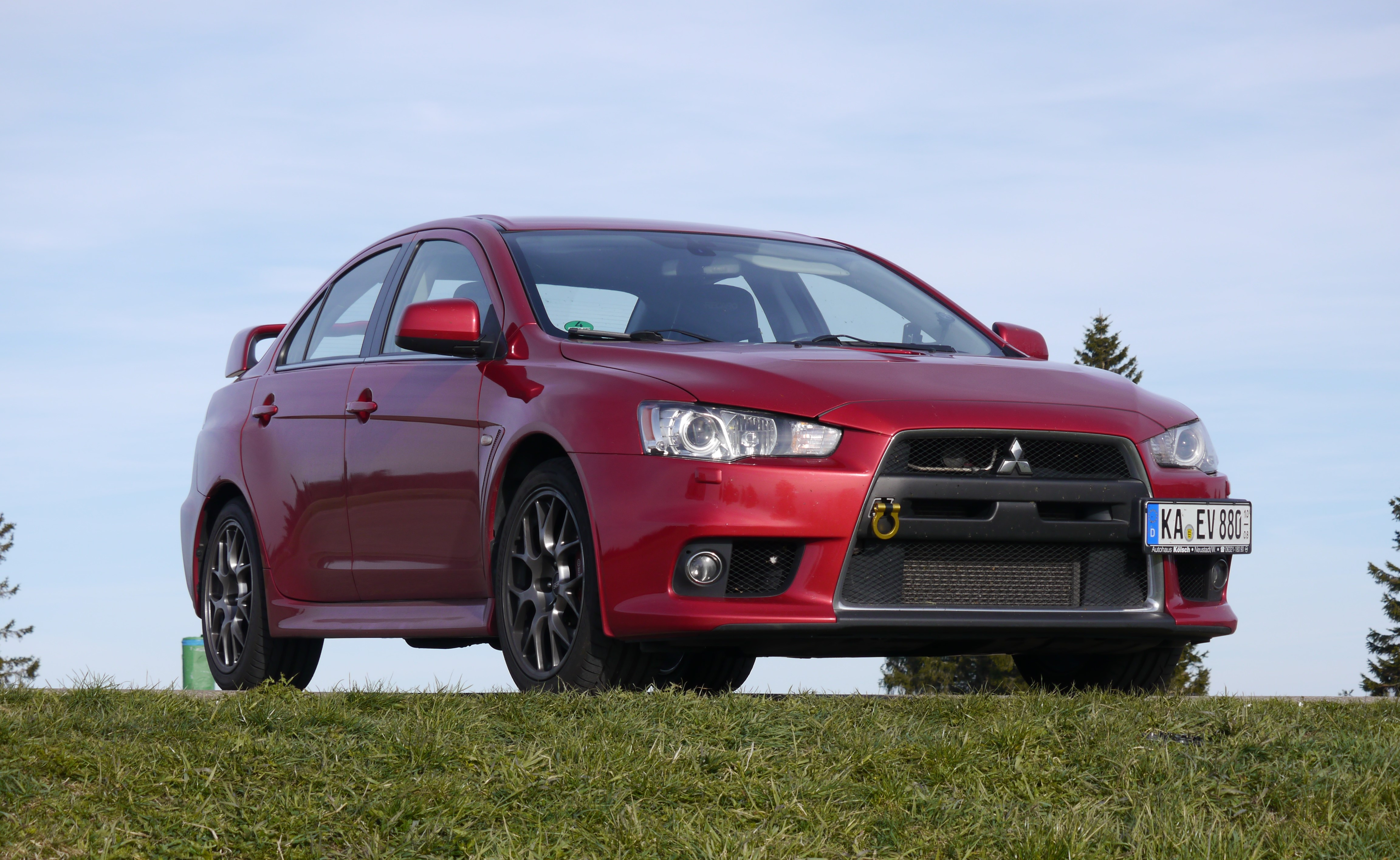
Mitsubishi Lancer Evolution X MR

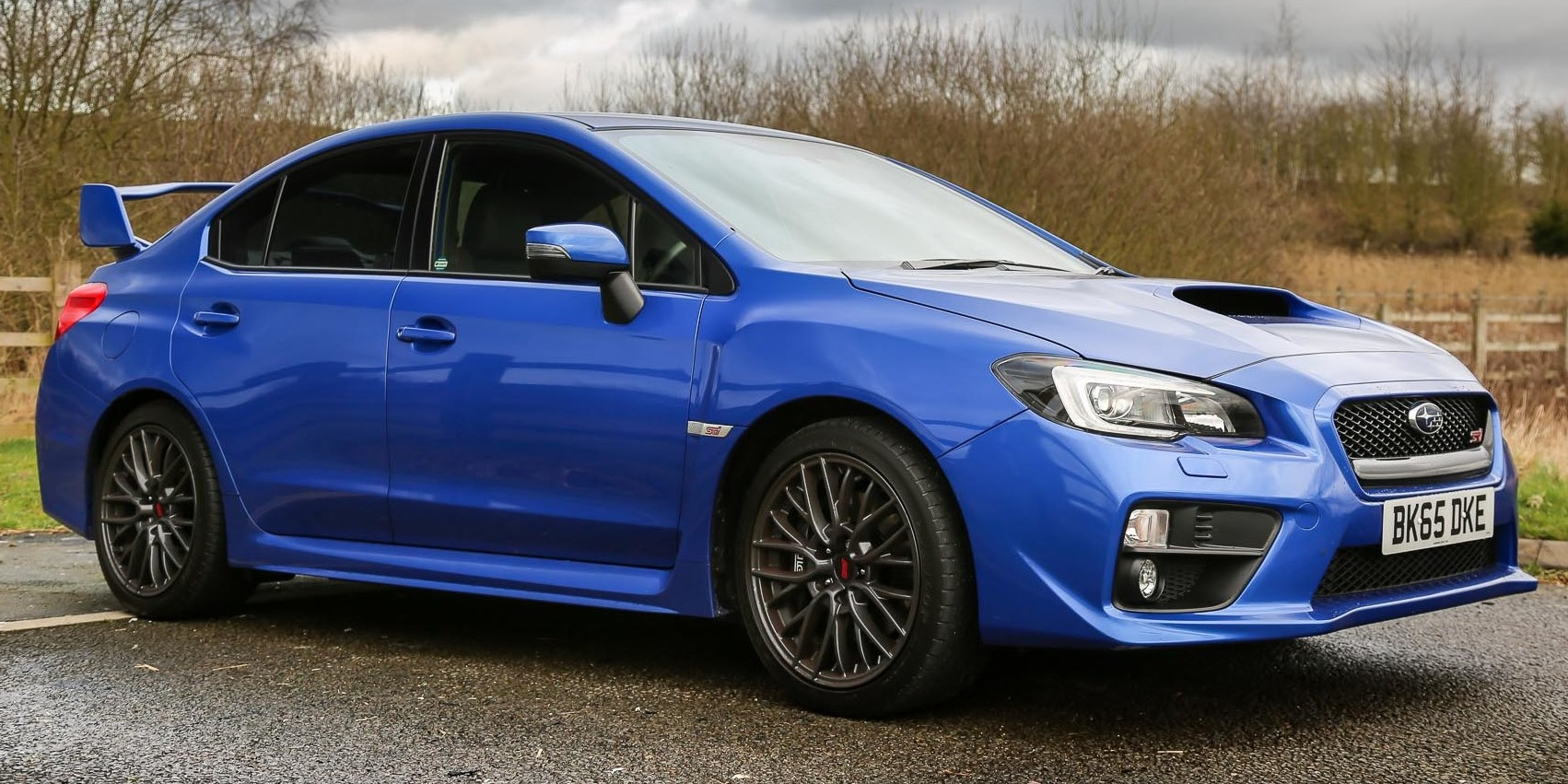
Subaru WRX STI

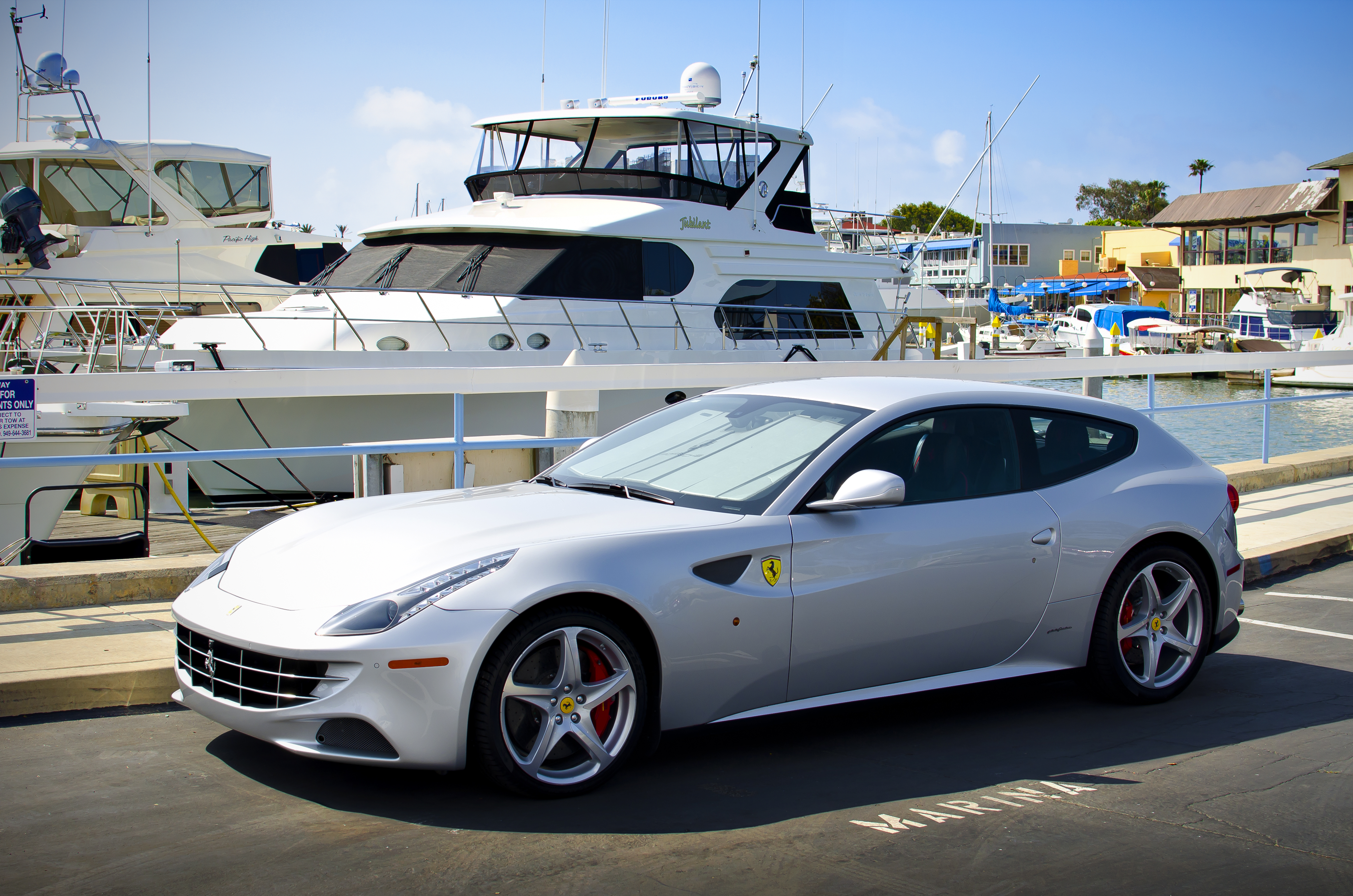
Ferrari FF; with a front mid-engine, four-wheel-drive layout

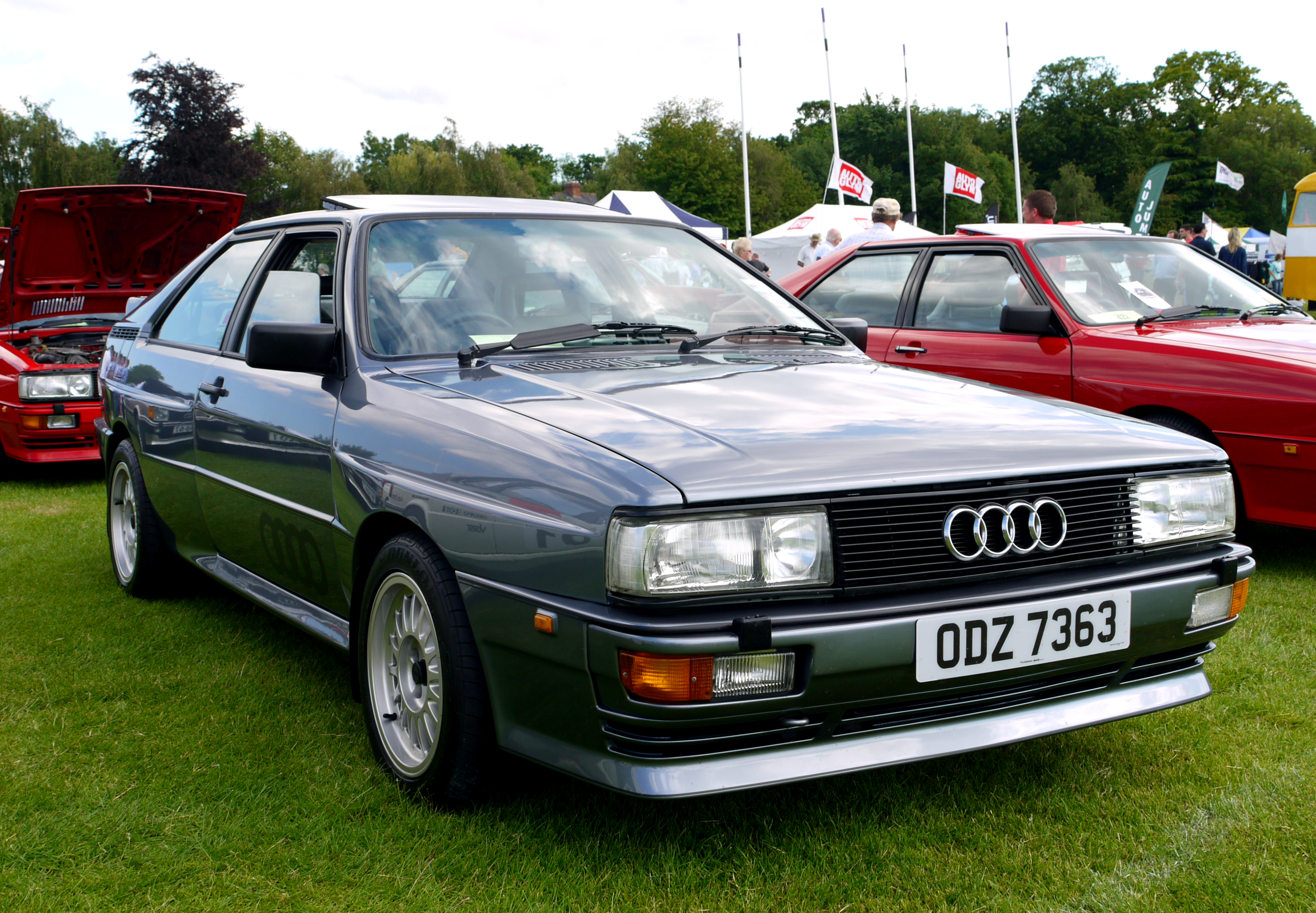
Audi Quattro

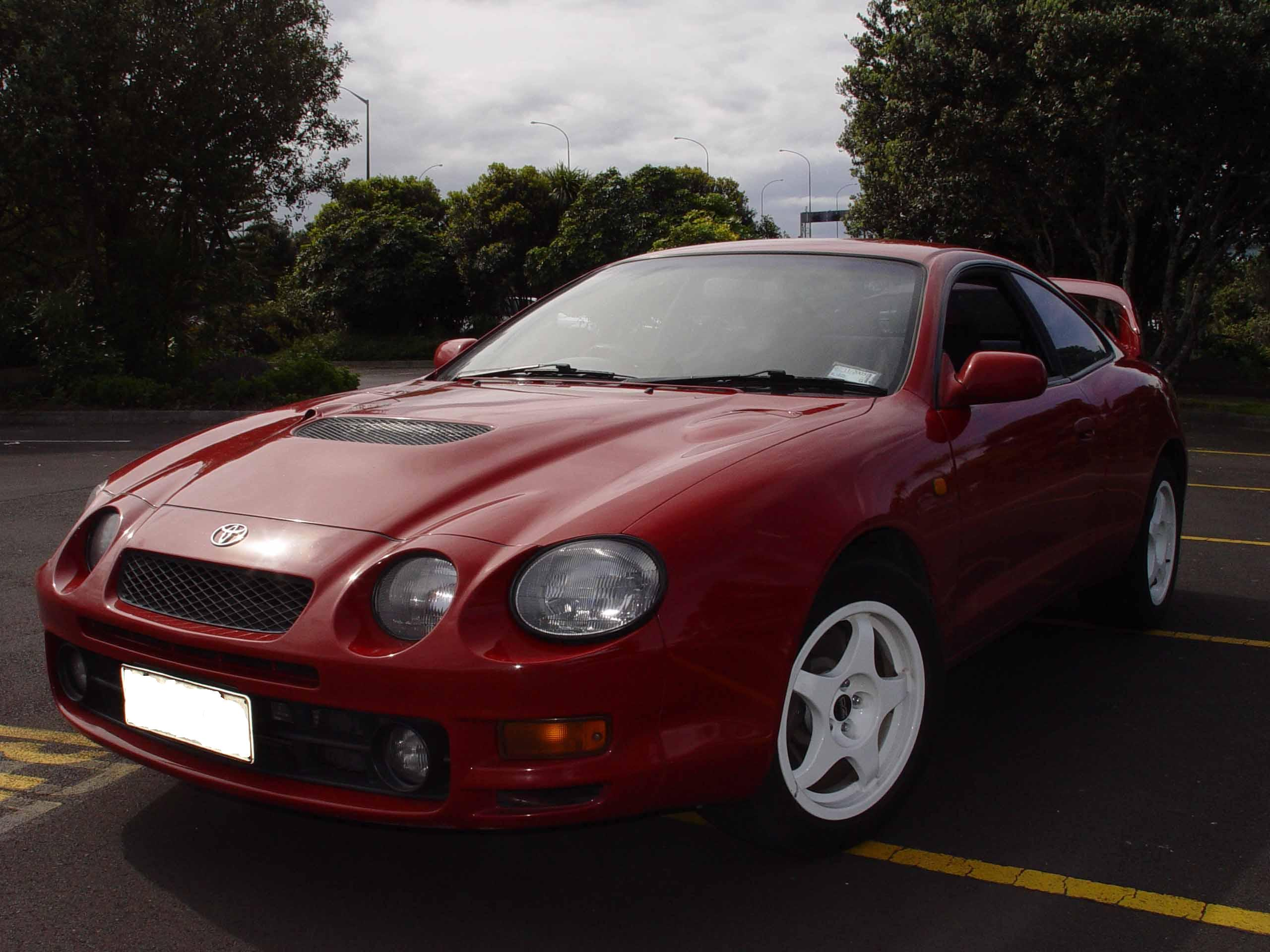
Toyota Celica GT-Four (ST205)
