= Pedrail Machine =

British fighting vehicle

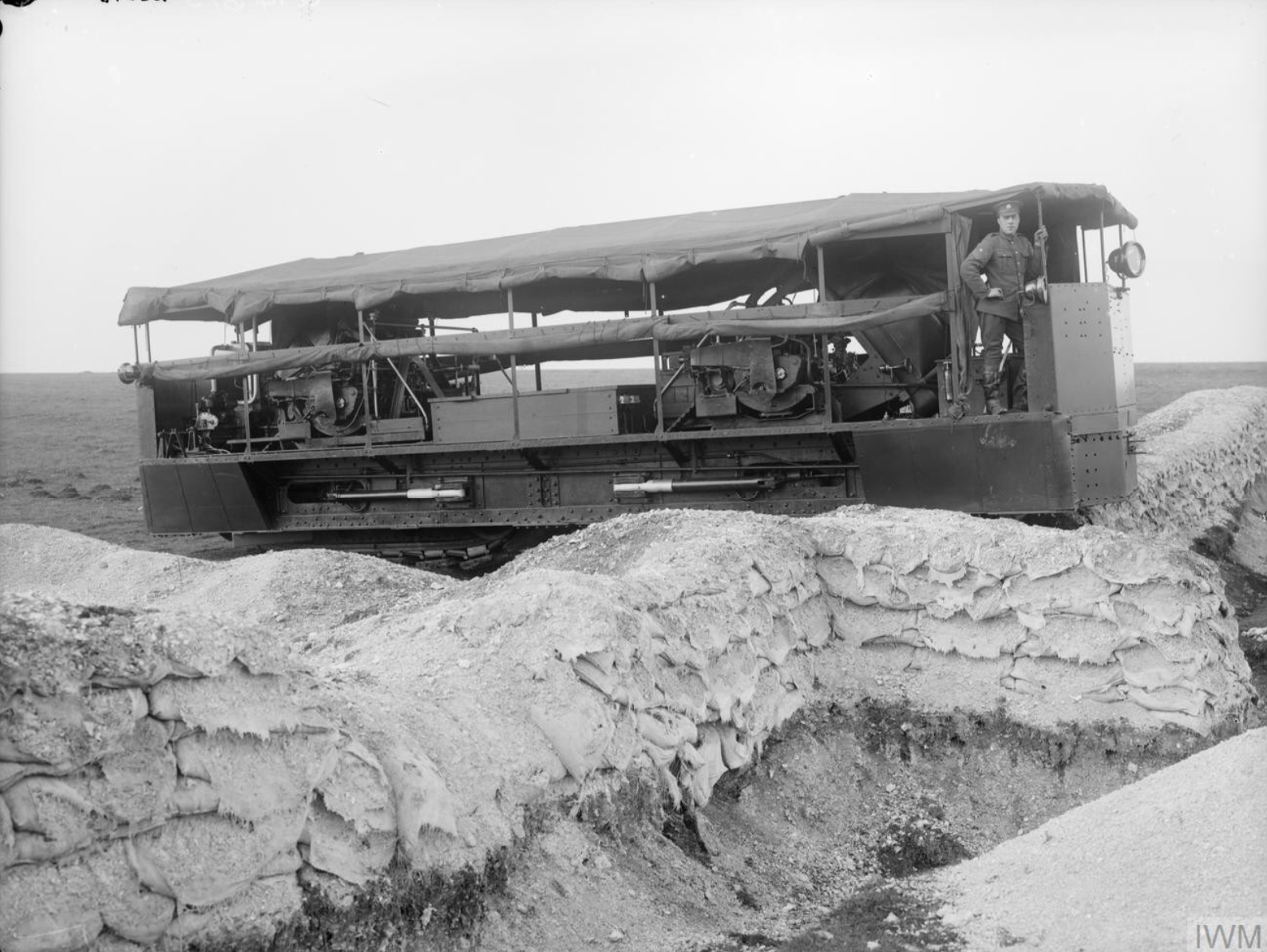
Trials with the sole prototype on the Salisbury Plain, c. 1917.

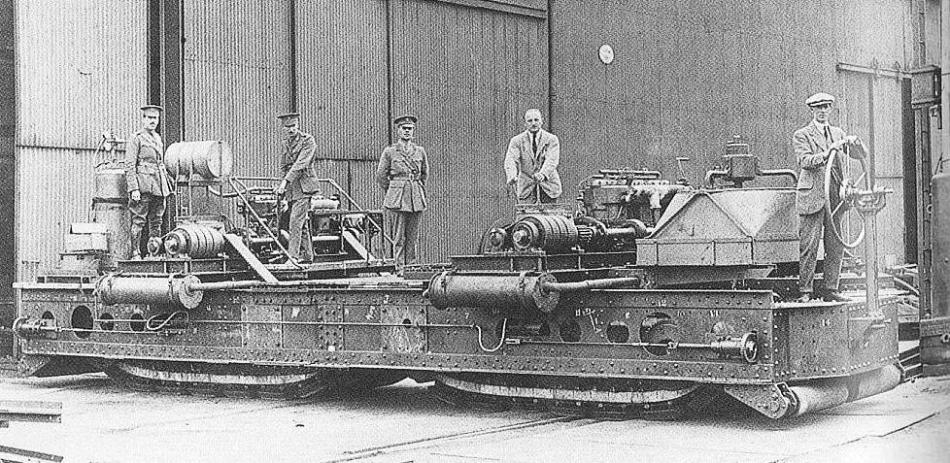
Prototype Pedrail troop transport developed as an offshoot of the Landship Committee.

The Pedrail Machine was an experimental British armoured fighting vehicle of the First World War. It was intended initially to be used as an armoured personnel carrier on the Western Front, but the idea was dropped in favour of other projects. Work on the machine was re-directed so that it could be used as the basis of a mobile flamethrower, but it was never completed and saw no action.

== Development ==
Following discussions by Captain Murray Sueter of the Royal Naval Air Service and Bramah Diplock of the Pedrail Transport Company, the machine was designed by the British engineer Colonel R.E.B. Crompton on behalf of the Landship Committee. The brief was for a vehicle that could carry a unit of troops - a "trench storming party of 50 men with machine guns and ammunition"- under protection across No Man's Land. Crompton's design as presented to the committee used two sets of continuous tracks in a vehicle around 40 feet (12 m) long, weighing around 25 tons and armed with a 12-pdr gun. Protection was 8 mm (0.31 in) of armour to the sides and 6 mm (0.24 in) on top. Two 46 hp (34 kW) Rolls-Royce engines drove the machine.

This led to an order for twelve machines being placed with the Metropolitan Carriage and Wagon Company in Birmingham. The Committee realised the design as supplied would not be able to readily manoeuvre through French villages and it was reworked to articulate it in the middle. At the same time the armour protection was increased to 12 mm (0.47 in). The original order for 12 was reduced to one, and then Metropolitan asked to be removed from the project to concentrate on other war work. The task of finishing the single vehicle went to William Foster and Co. (Note: At about the same time, Foster's was developing the first British tank) at Lincoln but with other, more promising, armoured vehicle projects coming along, even the building of a single Pedrail was cancelled by the authorities.

In July 1916 the machine was transferred to Stothert & Pitt in Bath, for completion as a mobile flamethrower. The finished chassis was handed over to the Trench Warfare Department in August, and sent for trials to the government research centre at Porton Down. It was deemed too heavy to be practical, and at the end of the war was taken to Bovington Camp, where it was eventually scrapped.
