= Dreadnaught wheel =

Wheel with articulated rails attached

Boydell's wheel as implemented by Burrell. Engraving from 1873.

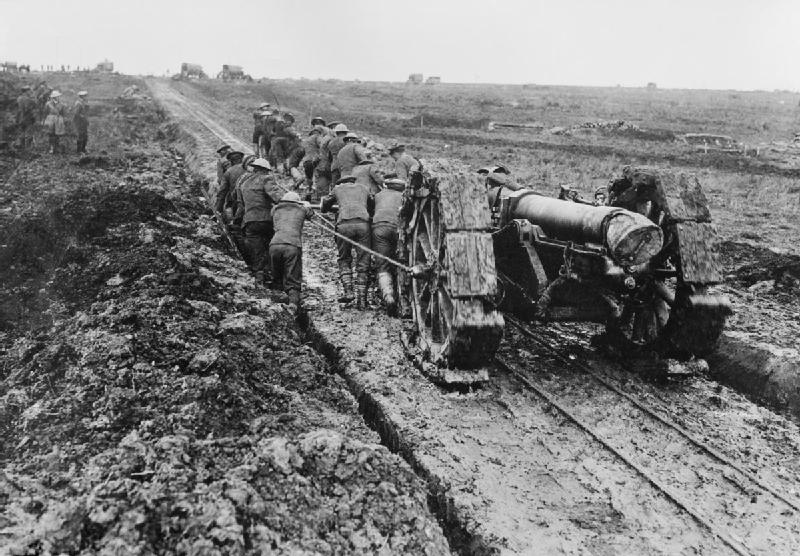
Soldiers pulling an artillery carriage through the mud during World War I

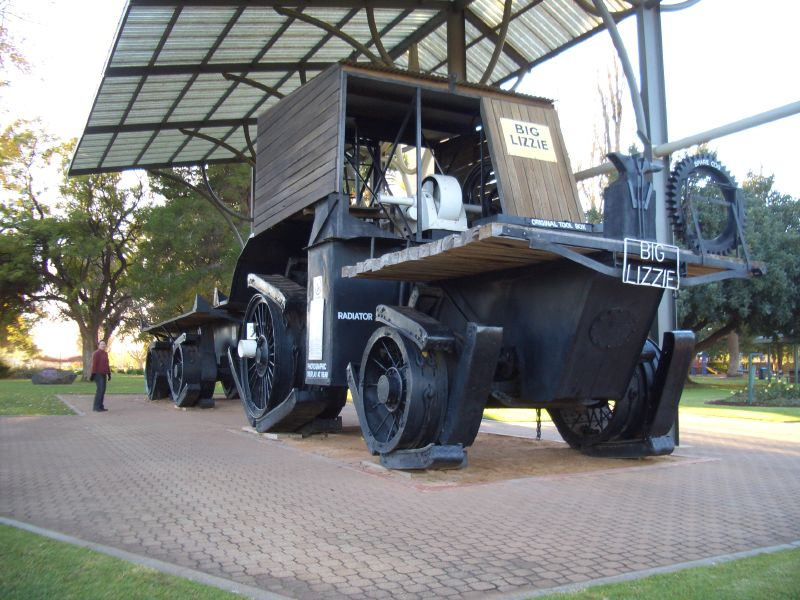
Bottrill's "Big Lizzie" with dreadnaught wheels

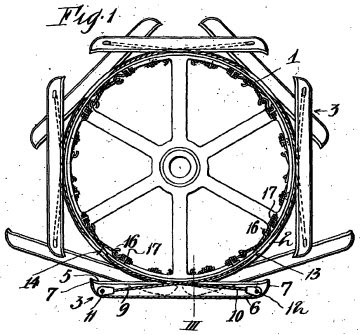
Illustration from Bottrill's 1912 patent filing in the United Kingdom

A dreadnaught wheel is a wheel with articulated rails attached at the rim to provide a firm footing for the wheel to roll over. These wheels have also been known as "endless railway wheels" when fitted to road locomotives, and were commonly fitted to steam traction engines. They are very similar to pedrail wheels, differing primarily in that their rails are not connected to the wheel directly, but articulated to each other.

Prior to wide adoption of continuous track on vehicles, traction engines were cumbersome and not suited to crossing soft ground or the rough roads and farm tracks of the time. The "endless rails" were wooden boards or flat steel plates attached around the outer circumference of the wheels, which spread the weight of the vehicle over a larger surface and hence made it less likely to get bogged by sinking into soft ground or skidding on slippery tracks.

An early version was patented by James Boydell in August 1846 and February 1854. Boydell worked with the British steam traction engine manufacturer Charles Burrell & Sons to produce road haulage engines from 1856 that used his continuous track design. Burrell later patented refinements of Boydell's design.

A number of horse-drawn wagons, carts and gun carriages using Boydell's design saw service with the British Army in the Crimean War (October 1853 and February 1856). The Royal Arsenal at Woolwich manufactured the wheels, and a letter of commendation was signed by Sir William Codrington, the General commanding the troops at Sebastapol.

An Australian blacksmith and engineer, Frank Bottrill (1871–1953), after a failed endeavour using wheeled traction engines in outback Australia, and becoming aware of the Boydell wheel, decided to improve the design. In 1907 he patented an "improved road wheel for travelling, useful for traction engines". Bottrill's design used two rows of overlapping rails fastened to the rim with cables to smooth the transition from rail to rail.

Eventually Bottrill, in association with A. H. MacDonald & Co. of Richmond, Melbourne, began producing steam and oil-based tractors fitted with his wheels. The most famous was known as "Big Lizzie," built in 1915, with a wheel diameter of 7 feet 2 inches (2.18 m). At 34 ft (10.4 m) long and 45 long tons (46 metrictonnes), with two dreadnought wheeled trailers it was capable of carrying a total of 80 long tons (81 metrictonnes) and effectively making its own roads.

Some references also use the term pedrail. The issue is further confused by Bottrill referring to his design as "ped-rail shoes". The two concepts are similar in that they attempt to improve cross-country performance by spreading out the load on a flat surface. The difference is primarily in how the pads are connected; the dreadnaught wheel connects the pads to each other and ride along the wheel, whereas in the pedrail arrangement, introduced in 1903, each pad is connected to a pivot on the wheel itself, and there are no inter-pad connections. Some pedrail systems also include internal suspensions to improve their performance over rough ground. Bottrill's design spans the definition, as its cable attachments are similar to the pedrail connections, albeit much more simple.

== See also ==
- Bonagente Grousers
