= Marshall Thomas Wilton Eady =

Marshall Thomas Wilton Eady (born Summer Hill, Sydney, Australia 18 November 1882; died Melbourne, Australia 8 December 1947) was an engineer He was the oldest child of William Wilton Eady, a "native-born ironmonger", and a Scottish woman named Barbara Rose. When Eady's father died in 1892, the family moved to Melbourne, where his uncle, Sir William McPherson, cared for them.

Eady was an engineering apprentice at Austral Otis before joining his uncle's firm, McPherson's, where he remained until his death.

McPherson died of a coronary occlusion at the wheel of his car in 1947. He was survived by his wife and three children.
