= James Boydell =

James Boydell (died January 1860) was a British inventor of steam traction engines. His most significant invention was the first practical track-laying vehicle, for which he received British patents in August 1846 and February 1854.

== Description ==
Boydell's wheel as implemented by Burrell

Boydell described his invention as "endless rails" or an "endless railway wheel", later variations became known as Dreadnaught Wheels. In his system wooden boards were attached to a wheel along their centre-line. They acted like snowshoes laid one in front of another as the wheel revolved. As the wheels revolved, the load on each wheel was spread over the area of one board. Boydell worked with the steam traction engine manufacturer Charles Burrell & Sons to produce road haulage engines from 1856 that used his continuous track design.

== Boydell Glacier ==
The United Kingdom Antarctic Place-Names Committee named Boydell Glacier on Trinity Peninsula in northern Graham Land, Antarctica, after him.

== See also ==
- Bramah Joseph Diplock
- Pedrail wheel
