= Queen's Theatre, Adelaide =

Performing arts venue in Adelaide, South Australia

Queen's Theatre
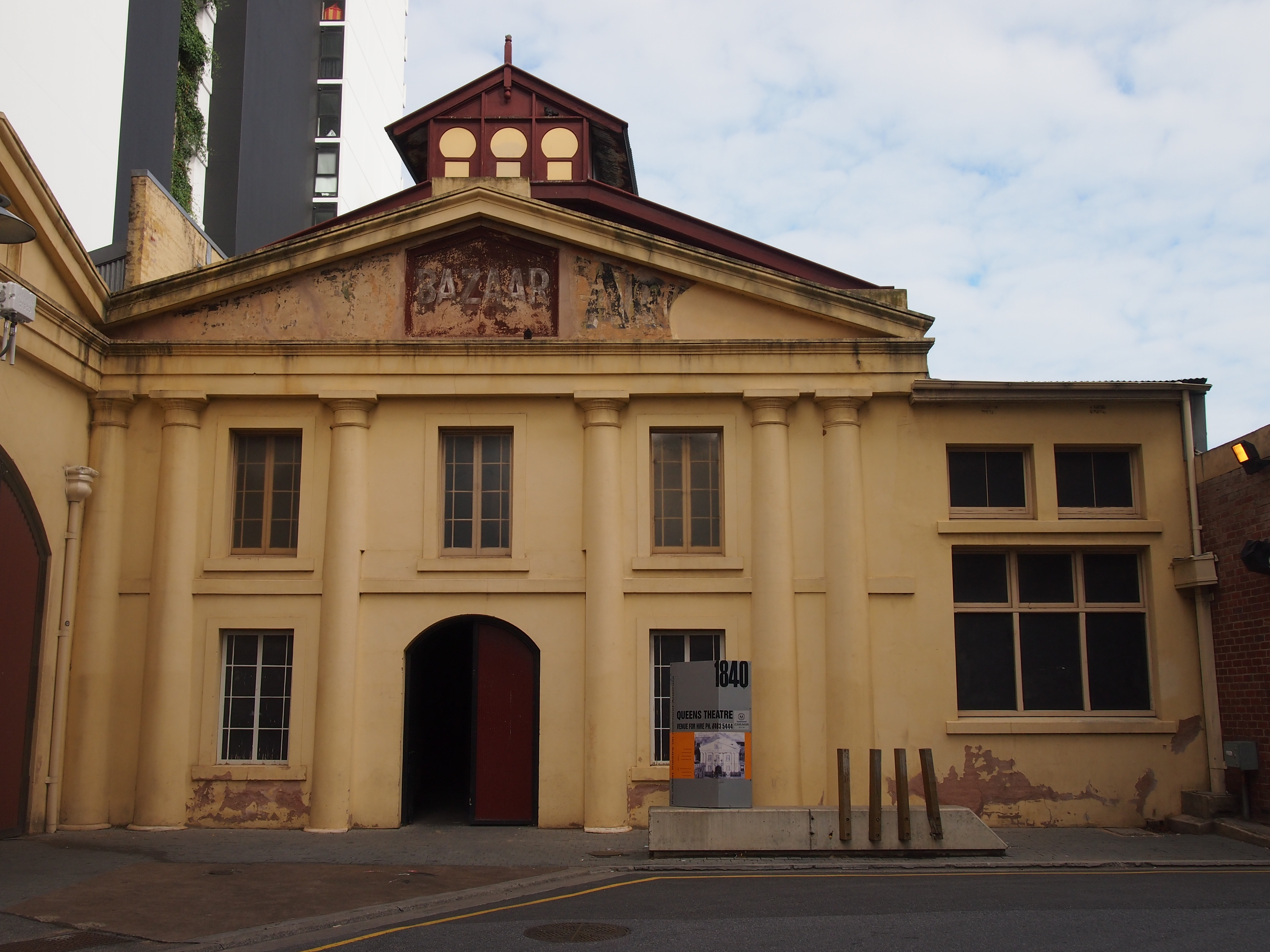
- Queen's Theatre in 2014
- Former names: Royal Victoria Theatre (1850–1868)

General information
- Type: Theatre
- Architectural style: Georgian
- Location: Corner of Playhouse Lane and Gilles Arcade, Adelaide, South Australia, Australia
- Coordinates: 34.9256°S 138.5956°E
- Completed: 1840
- Opened: 11 January 1841
- Renovated: 1850, 1859, 1861; conservation and reopening in 1996
- Client: Emanuel Solomon and Vaiben Solomon
- Owner: Government of South Australia

Website
- www.thequeensadelaide.com.au

South Australian Heritage Register
- Official name: Facades of former Queens Theatre
- Designated: 24 July 1980
- Reference no.: 10770

The Queen's Theatre is a building of historic importance in Playhouse Lane, Adelaide, South Australia. It is the oldest intact theatre in mainland Australia, having originally been built in 1840, the only earlier one in Australia being the still-operational Theatre Royal in Hobart, Tasmania (completed in 1836). It was not the first theatre to open in Adelaide however; there were two earlier, less sophisticated earlier venues created in 1838–39.

The Queen's original incarnation only lasted for a couple of years before a recession forced closure, and the building was turned to other uses. The New Queen's Theatre operated in the billiard room of the tavern next door between 1846 and 1850, until the Queen's refurbishment and re-opening as the Royal Victoria Theatre in 1850. "The Victoria", as it was known locally, was Adelaide's only theatre until 1868, when competition from the new Theatre Royal in Hindley Street led to its closure. After a series of other uses, Heritage SA bought the building in the 1980s, and it was eventually restored and reopened as a performance venue in the 1996 Adelaide Festival.

== History ==
=== Background ===
By the early 1800s, live performance was increasing in popularity in Australia, although no entertainment venues existed to house performances. In the 1830s, both Sydney and Hobart received two theatres, the first in the Australian colonies. The first theatre to open in Adelaide was the Theatre Royal in 1838, on the first floor of the Adelaide Tavern in Franklin Street, one of Adelaide's main hotels, just two years after the colony was founded. On 23 November 1839, Samson Cameron, an actor and theatre company manager, opened the Royal Victoria Theatre on North Terrace near Morphett Street in a converted warehouse.

=== First Queen's ===
Attempts to build a more substantial theatre in an increasingly prosperous Adelaide were made, with a declaration by the South Australian Register stating "...Mr Solomon, of Currie Street, is about to make an important addition to the quarter of Gilles Arcade, by the erection of a spacious and handsome edifice which he ends to fit up as a theatre".

At first known as Solomon's Theatre, it was built in 1840 for ex-convicts Emanuel Solomon (1800–1873), who moved to Adelaide in 1837, and his Sydney-based brother Vaiben Solomon (1802–1860) for £3000 with seating for over 1000 people. The project had dire predictions of failure from the press and opened with Othello on 11 January 1841, the manager John Lazar in the title role, to "mixed reviews".

Unfortunately, public appetite for entertainment had waned with a financial recession brought on by Governor Grey's fiscally responsible regime following the prosperity of Governor Gawler's rule, when huge sums were invested in public infrastructure. After months of losing money, Lazar dismissed his company and converted the seating to something more appropriate to public meetings, and some use was made of the theatre for public meetings and lectures, but did not renew his lease. Solomon offered the government use of the theatre gratis if they would prohibit the building of further taverns in the vicinity (his Shakspere Tavern, subsequently named Temple Tavern, was adjacent). This was rejected, but in 1843 the government signed a contract with Solomon for three years' rental at £200 per annum for use as Resident Magistrates Court, Supreme Court and offices for the Registrar General, the Advocate General, the Assistant Crown Solicitor and Assistant to the Bench of Magistrates.

Between 1846 and 1847 Solomon, whose nephew Judah Moss Solomon (1818–1880) was an occasional partner, attempted to sell the theatre and tavern by lottery, but it was never fully subscribed so he refunded to the punters their stakes.

=== Reopened as Royal Victoria ===
The building was reopened as a theatre, re-using the name Royal Victoria Theatre, under the management of John Lazar and George Coppin on 23 December 1850.

In 1861 it closed for refurbishment and substantial remodelling, and reopened in July with A. J. Solomon the new lessee and Robert MacGowan the stage manager of what was Adelaide's only theatre until the opening of the Theatre Royal at 28 Hindley Street on 13 April 1868, which spelled the demise of the "Victoria".

=== Other uses ===
It then became successively a dance hall designated the "Prado", the headquarters for the City Mission, Formby's Horse Bazaar (1877–c. 1900). From 1908 until 1928, John Shannon occupied the premises for use as sales yards, livery, stables and forge.

Between 1933 and 1973, it was occupied by McPherson's, Dalgety's Factory and Store, and McPherson's Showroom, in that order.

=== 20th–21st centuries ===
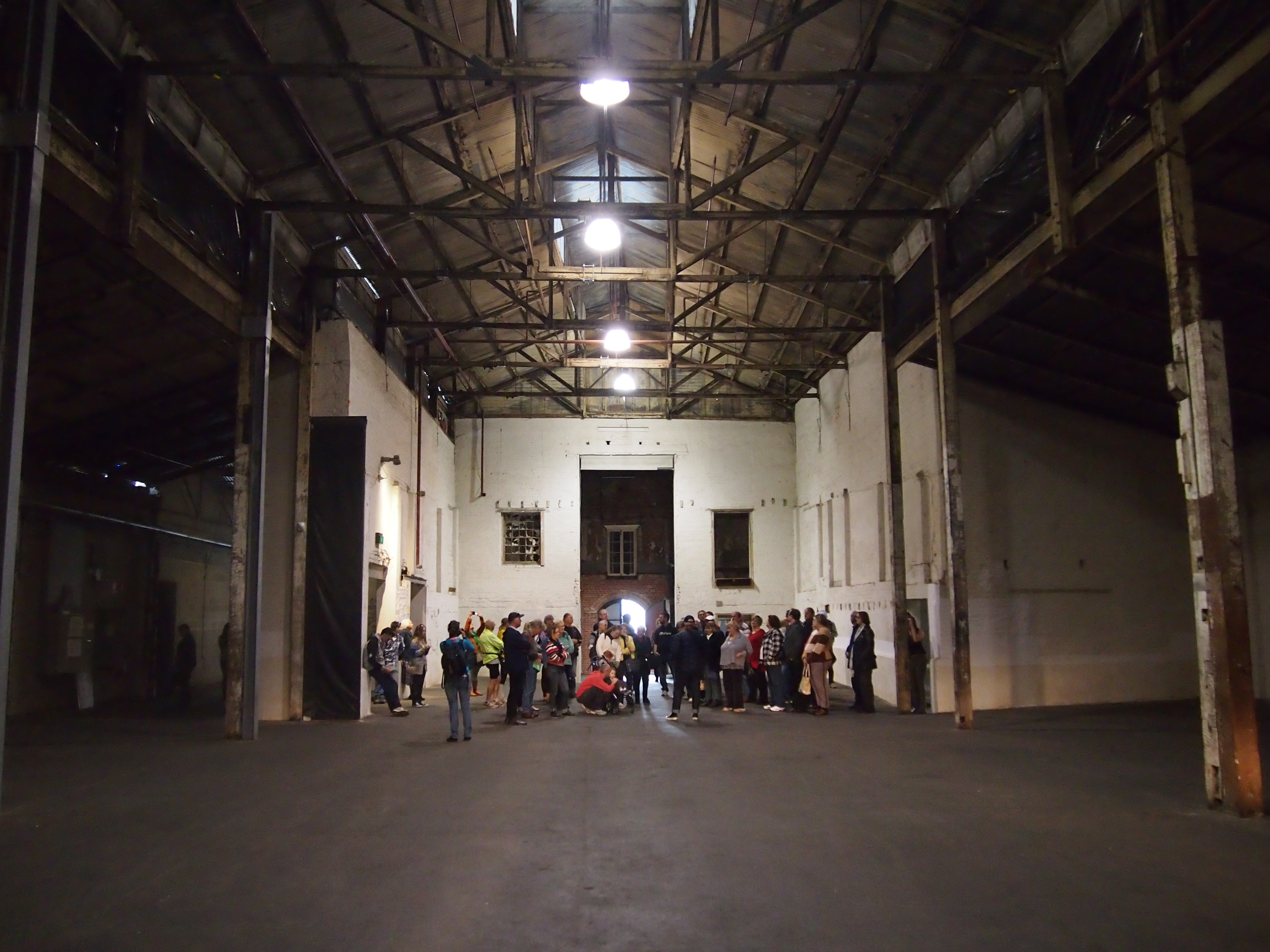
The partially restored interior, now used as a performance space, during a History Month tour in 2014

In the 1980s the building was at risk of demolition, until parts of the original theatre were discovered, which sparked protests from the public (including from Barry Humphries) to conserve the building. These features included dressing rooms and the orchestra pit. The South Australian Government, upon acquiring the property after negotiations in the 1990s, initiated efforts to conserve its surviving heritage architecture. As of 2019 the shell of the original theatre still stands within the 1850s facade of the Royal Victoria Theatre.

Excavation also revealed historically significant remains and numerous artefacts, including clay pipes, bottles, plates, buttons, props and costumes, shoes, candlesticks and stage decorations, the most significant treasure being a gold and ruby earring featuring dangling ivy leaves, which is now in a collection managed by the History Trust of South Australia. Most of the artefacts were transferred to the South Australian Museum in 2016.

The Queen's Theatre was reopened as a performance venue at the 1996 Adelaide Festival of Arts, with a performance of The Magic Flute by Opera Australia. Following essential refurbishments, it was reopened for the launch of the 1998 Festival by Robyn Archer. The theatre is still used as a performance space and function venue, but with stringent conditions intended to preserve as far as possible, the old character of the building.

The Theatre was managed by Arts South Australia from 2010 to 2018, before being taken over by GWB McFarlane Theatres.

==== The Queen's Wall ====
In 2025, The Queen's Wall, a 32-metre public artwork by Mary Moore and interactive media studio Sandpit, was installed on the western wall of the Queen's Theatre. The work comprises seven panels relating to episodes from the theatre's history and is accompanied by a mobile app with augmented reality and audio elements.

The project was commissioned by the South Australian Department of the Premier and Cabinet and delivered by Guildhouse, with research support from AusStage and the Lost Theatres Project.

== New Queen's Theatre (1846−c.1850) ==
A new theatre was built in 1846 for George Coppin on nearby land on Light Square belonging to Solomon and managed by John Lazar, designed architect Thomas Price. The hall held 700 and had the distinction of prohibiting smoking in the boxes. In January 1850, the New Queen's Theatre was described by the South Australian Register as "a hotbed of demoralization" and that "no man can sit out a performance without being disgusted; no lady can enter the impure precincts without contamination". This article was the subject of a successful libel case against editor John Stephens in March 1850.

The Adelaide Garrick Club may have been the last company to mount plays there, with productions of three Thomas Morton comedies, the last in September 1850. There is no newspaper reference to this theatre after November 1850.
