= W. H. Formby =

William Harper Formby (14 April 1818 – 12 October 1892), generally referred to as W. H. Formby, was a South Australian pioneer, horse breeder, broker, exporter and dealer.

== History ==
Formby was born in Liverpool, England, to John Formby and Helen Formby, née Harper, of Maghull, near Liverpool.

By 1841 he and his brother John Formby were stockholders in the Little Para area.

In May 1843 the brig Davidsons arrived at Port Adelaide with William Formby in the cabin, and a great quantity of merchandise in the hold to account of Formby brothers, who then offered for sale a range of requisites ex Davidsons and subsequent passage and carriage of freight to Hobart Town. Passengers from Adelaide to Tasmania included Mr H. Formby, Mr E. Formby, Mr and Mrs Hall and two children, Mr and Mrs Fairchild, Mrs Evans and two children, Mr and Mrs Brooks, and Alexander Stewart. Similar advertisements were placed in the Sydney newspapers. In July 1843 the Formby brothers announced a similar sale of requisites, ex Davidsons, in Hobart. The Formby brothers made further imports to South Australia: a shipment aboard Marys from Tasmania, which included 20 horses, and saddlery aboard Joseph Wheeler and another horse per Royal Archer,

It is likely the two brothers, perhaps with other members of the family, came to South Australia around 1840 to assess investment opportunities and one returned to Britain to put together a marketable quantity of in-demand commodities, while the other took advantage of opportunities to establish social and business connections and facilities.

By 1843 Formby was accepted as a member of the South Australian "establishment". This was a period of economic stagnation, Governor Grey's economic stringency in response to Gawler's profligacy; a period when businesses which managed to remain solvent profited when conditions improved.

Formby operated a shipping business, organising freight and passage between Adelaide and other colonies from premises in Gilbert Place.

By 1853 he was involved in colonial horse racing as an official, serving as starter.

His export trade in horses may have begun in 1858 with a single animal being despatched to Bombay. He had an office in Currie Street from 1859 to 1883 and stables at Lockleys ("The Reedbeds"), and Rapid Bay.

He supplied 45 horses for New Zealand in 1863, presumably as remounts associated with the New Zealand Wars.

Formby went into partnership with C. S. Hare to manufacture and market heavily compressed chaff cakes, each of 45 pounds (20 kg) and measuring 18 by 18 by 4.5 inches (460 mm × 460 mm × 110 mm), as a convenient and nutritious feed for horses exposed to long sea voyages. The product was received favourably at the 1866 Agricultural Show.

He supplied 21 horses for Calcutta He supplied 18 horses for the Overland Telegraph Line construction

He also entered horses for meetings of the South Australian Jockey Club; his brown gelding Enfield won several good races in 1862 and 1863, and his bay geldings Fluke in 1867 and Mentor in 1873 were successful, but he was better known as an official, particularly as timekeeper 1877–1878 and clerk of the course 1878–1879. His son H. H. Formby was (non-veterinary) surgeon to the Strathalbyn Racing Club 1926–1934.

Formby ran the horse bazaar "John Bull Yards" from 1870, in latter years in partnership with Joseph Boase (c. 1838 – 20 March 1898), who had been in his employ since the late 1850s and married Catherine Paynter (1843–1922) in Strathalbyn in 1863. He was recognised as an authority on horseflesh.

In 1872, Thomas Gepp, a veterinary surgeon who had a practice in association with the John Bull yard, considered himself forced to defend his competence and independence from Formby after accusations (not found) by one Durieu, perhaps (police inspector) Durieu.

In 1877 Formby and Boase purchased the Queen's Theatre, Adelaide for conversion to a Tattersall's Horse Bazaar, and after considerable building work by Matthias White, Formby's Horse Bazaar was opened by Sir John Morphett in December.

In 1880 Formby began selling off his stock. He sold up his home and extensive property on the Bay Road, Forestville, in order to live closer to the city.

The partnership was dissolved in 1884 and in 1885 the business became known as Boase's Horse Bazaar. (Note: In 1891 the business became "Allen's Horse Bazaar", in 1898 "Troy's Horse and Carriage Bazaar"; in 1901 Paltridge's Bazaar, later Butler & Shannon's or Shannon's Horse Bazaar.)

== Family ==
Formby married Eleanor Elizabeth White (c. 1844 – 28 April 1926) on 11 November 1863; they had five sons and three daughters:

- Eleanor Formby (1865– ) married Henry Percival Moore on 30 November 1885
- Robert Formby (1866– ) married Madeline Rose Hotson of Robe on 8 September 1897, lived in Western Australia.
- Arthur Formby (1869–1958), married Elsie Florence of Langhorne's Creek
- Florence Formby (1872– ) married Richard C. Graham on 13 November 1897, lived in Adelaide
- Frederick William "Fred" Formby (1875–1955), of Clarendon
- Henry Harper Formby (5 December 1876 – 18 January 1956), of Strathalbyn

- Henry Lonsdale Formby (1912– )

- Hugh Formby (1879–1948)
- Norah Formby (1881– ) married Albert Curtis on 3 March 1908, of Ballarat

After the death of her husband in 1892, Mrs Formby remained at their home "Metala", Langhorne Creek for a few years, then in 1904 left to live with her son H. H. Formby at Strathalbyn.

John Formby (1820 – 30 September 1906) was a brother, who arrived in 1840 and had a business in Port Adelaide. He married Mary Ann Hollow, and together they had 13 children. He was mayor of Port Adelaide 1869–1871, chairman of the Port Adelaide Football Club 1880–1892 and father of several prominent citizens, including:

- Edward Formby (1848– ) married Sarah Solway Hanson in 1872, lived in Port Adelaide
- Alfred Formby (1856–1932), founder and starter 1892–1897 for the Port Adelaide Racing Club.

Their brother Robert Formby gained fame as an inventor.
