= Bramah Joseph Diplock =

English investor

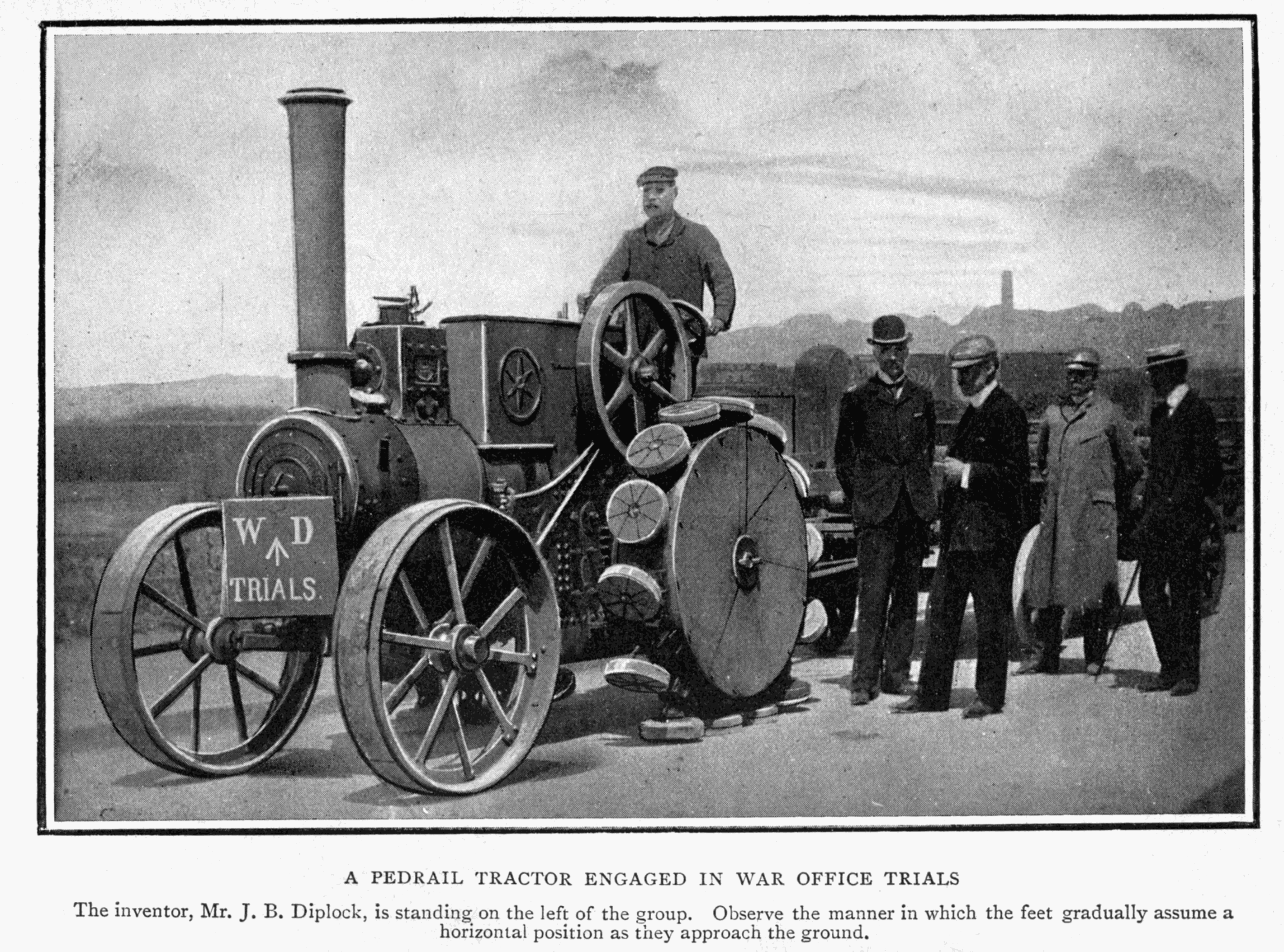
A pedrail tractor engaged in war office trials. Diplock stands left in group.

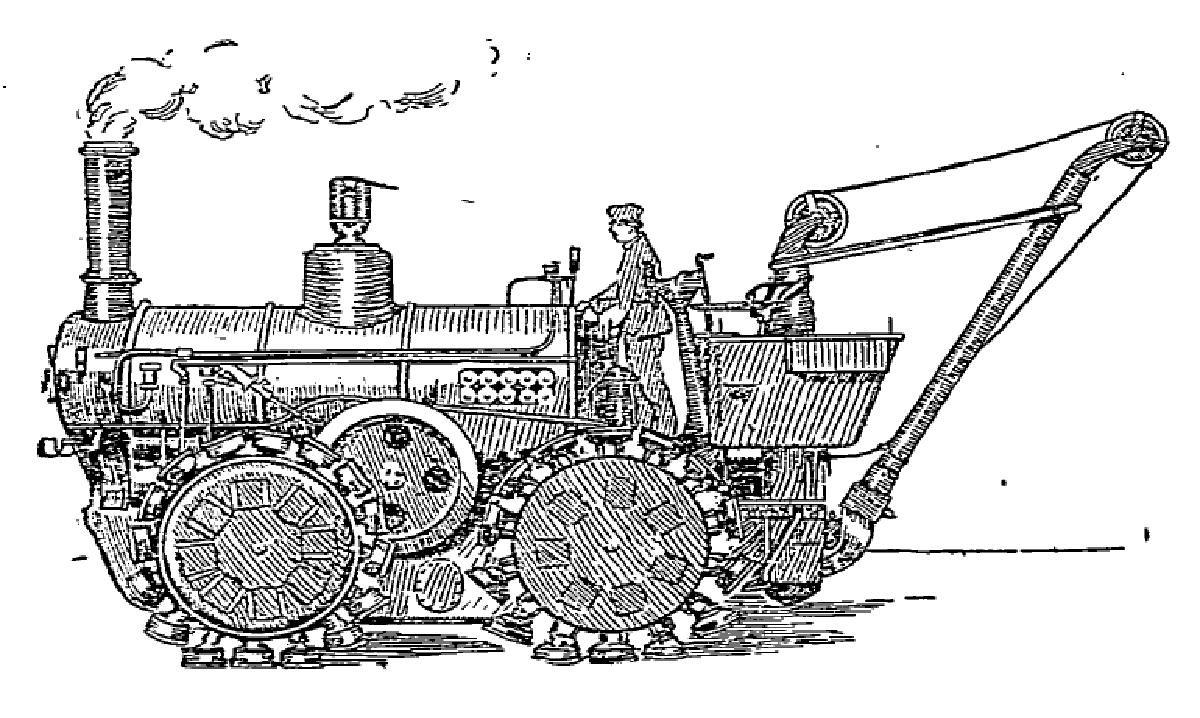
A locomotive fitted with Diplock's pedrail wheels, 7 February 1904 The New York Times.

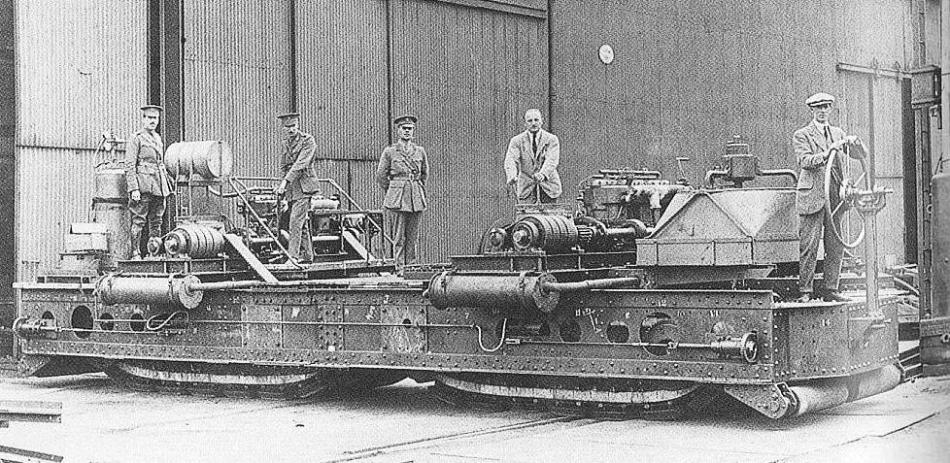
Prototype Pedrail troop transport developed as an offshoot of the Landship Committee.

Bramah Joseph Diplock (27 April 1857 – 9 August 1918) was an English inventor who invented the pedrail wheel in 1899 and the pedrail chaintrack, a type of caterpillar track, in 1907.

Diplock was born in Chelsea, London to Thomas Bramah Diplock, a coroner, and Eleanor Diplock. He died suddenly on 9 August 1918 of brain hemorrhage at 21 Heathfield Close, Chiswick, aged 62.

Diplock Glacier in Antarctica is named after him due to his contribution to the development of tracked vehicles.

== Inventions ==
Diplock's first inventions improved traction in geared steam locomotives (both road and rail) by extending drive to all wheels, as well as solving the resulting challenges to also steer the vehicle. Diplock's inventions for these were granted patents dating back to 1893, when he was living in Falmouth, Cornwall.

This desire for greater traction in road locomotives (traction engines) probably led directly to the pedrail system which he patented in 1899. In this design the continuously laid tracks contain rollers and the rails roll over them, which gave it the capability for crossing banks and ditches, as well as soft ground; a capability that attracted the attention of the War Office. The practical realisation of this was the Pedrail Tractor made by William Foster & Co. of Lincoln, from which an account in 1904 of a trial attended by members of the War Office proved its ability to tow a heavy load over rough ground, climbs hills and turn with ease, and show a 2 ton drawbar pull.

In 1902 he published a book about his pedrail system and the experiments and experience with two traction engines fitted with it. Publisher Longman, Green and Company, entitled "A New System of Heavy Goods Transport on Common Roads".

In 1907 Bramah applied for a patent for the pedrail system where the track was laid in a chain link. However, a similar looking tracked system had already been patented in 1904 by David Roberts, Chief Engineer of Richard Hornsby & Sons Ltd, and reports in the press of the time appear to sometimes confuse the two systems. The term 'pedrail' becoming more generic in application, as was 'caterpillar track'. There are reports that Pedrail chaintrack tractors, and towed trailers, using this principle were under evaluation by the War Office by early 1909, though the pictured vehicle bears a remarkable similarity to the Hornsby vehicle under evaluation at the time. The pedrail chaintrack system was to have an important influence on tank development, although it was not the pedrail tracked system that was adopted. Faced with trench warfare there were ideas supported by Winston Churchill and Lord Fisher (First Sea Lord) for land battleships, however Sir Percy Scott argued that these huge slow moving devices would be destroyed by artillery fire before they could be effective. It was then that Commodore Murray Sueter suggested adapting the pedrail chaintrack system. A demonstration of the pedrail chaintrack was hastily arranged before Lloyd George, Winston Churchill and other senior War Office staff, where "a demonstration was given of the powers of the caterpillar in forcing wire entaglements and surmounting obstacles". As a result of these trials 18 pedrail equipped armoured tracked vehicles were ordered, however in the end only one prototype was created (see Pedrail Machine). The pedrail system, with rollers in the tracks and rails on the chassis, lost out to the simpler system with linked tracks forming a temporary road way for numerous wheels on the chassis.

== Pedrail Transport Company ==
Diplock founded the Pedrail Transport Company of Fulham in 1911, and at the outbreak of World War I it was the only British company still manufacturing "caterpillar" continuous tracks. A demonstration of the system's ability to support a large load for trench warfare was made on 16 February 1915 to Winston Churchill, and may have been influential in the development of the tank.

The company went into liquidation in 1921.

== See also ==
- James Boydell
