= Pedrail wheel =

Type of all terrain wheel, replaced by caterpillar treads

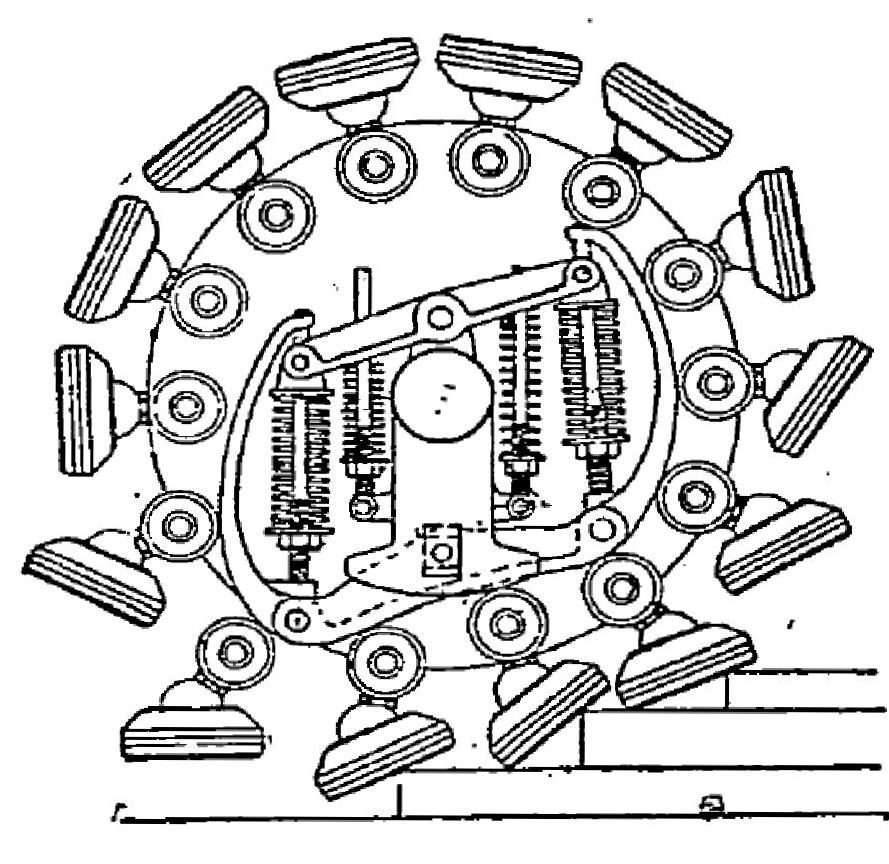
An advanced design pedrail wheel climbing stairs.

The pedrail wheel is a type of all-terrain wheel developed in the late 19th and early 20th century by Londoner Bramah Joseph Diplock. It consists of a series of "feet" (pedes in Latin) connected to pivots on a wheel. As the wheel travels, pressure exerted by springs within it increases the number of feet in contact with the ground, thus reducing ground pressure and allowing the wheel to negotiate obstacles and uneven ground.

== Definition ==
According to the 1913 Webster's Revised Unabridged Dictionary, a pedrail is:

A device intended to replace the wheel of a self-propelled vehicle for use on rough roads and to approximate to the smoothness in running of a wheel on a metal track. The tread consists of a number of rubber shod feet which are connected by ball-and-socket joints to the ends of sliding spokes. Each spoke has attached to it a small roller which in its turn runs under a short pivoted rail controlled by a powerful set of springs. This arrangement permits the feet to accommodate themselves to obstacles even such as steps or stairs.

— Webster's Revised Unabridged Dictionary, C&G Merriam, 1913.

== Fiction ==
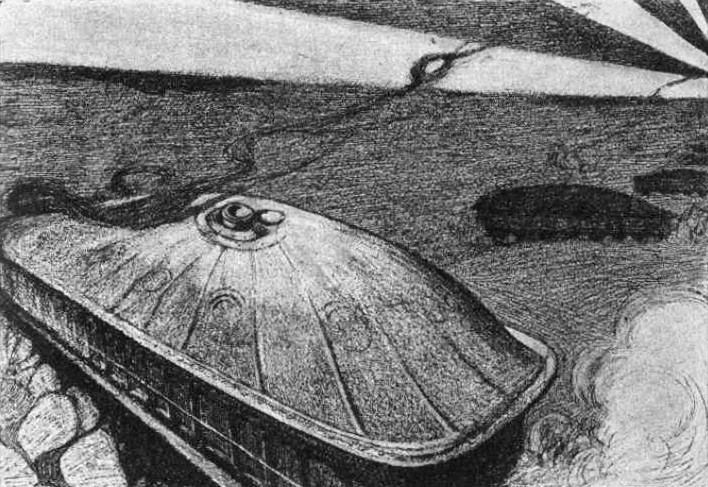
1904 illustration of H. G. Wells' December 1903 The Land Ironclads, showing huge ironclad land vessels, equipped with pedrail wheels.

H. G. Wells, in his short story The Land Ironclads, published in The Strand Magazine in December 1903, described the use of large, armoured cross-country vehicles, armed with automatic rifles and moving on pedrail wheels, to break through a system of fortified trenches, disrupting the defence and clearing the way for an infantry advance:

They were essentially long, narrow and very strong steel frameworks carrying the engines, and borne upon eight pairs of big pedrail wheels, each about ten feet in diameter, each a driving wheel and set upon long axles free to swivel round a common axis. This arrangement gave them the maximum of adaptability to the contours of the ground. They crawled level along the ground with one foot high upon a hillock and another deep in a depression, and they could hold themselves erect and steady sideways upon even a steep hillside.

—

In War and the Future, Wells acknowledged Diplock's pedrail as the origin for his idea of an all-terrain armoured vehicle:

The idea was suggested to me by the contrivances of a certain Mr. Diplock, whose "ped-rail" notion, the notion of a wheel that was something more than a wheel, a wheel that would take locomotives up hill-sides and across ploughed fields, was public property nearly twenty years ago

—

Although Wells describes the pedrail wheels in detail, a number of authors have mistakenly taken his description to be of some form of caterpillar track. Diplock's version of an endless track was not designed until around ten years after the publication of Wells' story. The pedrail wheel played no part in the design of the first British tanks.

== Chaintrack ==
In 1910, Diplock abandoned the pedrail wheel, and began developing what he called the chaintrack, in which fixed wheels ran on a moving belt, very like the caterpillar track as it is now understood. It was a complicated and high-maintenance system, and in 1914, Diplock eventually produced a version on a simpler, single wide track. With a body fitted, the machine could carry a ton of cargo, and be pulled with minimal effort by a horse. It demonstrated the attributes of the caterpillar track: low friction and low ground pressure.

== Bibliography ==
- Harris, JP (1995), Men, ideas, and tanks: British Military Thought and Armoured Forces, 1903–1939 (hardback), War, Armed Forces and Society, vol. 1, Manchester University Press, ISBN 0-7190-3762-X.
- Wells, Herbert George (30 June 2008) [1917], War and the Future, Kessinger, ISBN 978-0-497-97078-9.
- White, BT (1963), British Tanks 1915–1945, Shepperton: Ian Allan.
- Glanfield, John (2006), The Devil's Chariots: The Birth and Secret Battles of the First Tanks, Sutton Pub, ISBN 0-7509-4152-9.
