= Dreadnought (disambiguation) =

The dreadnought was the predominant type of battleship in the early 20th century.

Dreadnought may also refer to:

== Ships ==
- English ship Dreadnought (1573), a 41-gun ship
- HMS Dreadnought (1660), a 52-gun third-rate ship of the line
- HMS Dreadnought (1691), a 60-gun fourth-rate ship of the line
- HMS Dreadnought (1742), a 60-gun fourth-rate ship of the line
- HMS Dreadnought (1801), a 98-gun second-rate
- Dreadnought (clipper), a three-masted medium clipper ship that sailed for the Red Cross Line of New York and Liverpool packets
- HMS Dreadnought (1875), a battleship
- HMS Dreadnought (1906), a revolutionary "all big gun" battleship
- HMS Dreadnought (S101), a nuclear-powered submarine launched in 1960
- USS Dreadnought (SP-584), a patrol boat in commission from 1917 to 1919
- Dreadnought-class submarine - the planned replacements for the UK Trident deterrent fleet

== Literature ==
- Dreadnought!, a 1986 Star Trek novel by Diane Carey
- Dreadnought (book), a 1991 book by Robert K. Massie
- Workers' Dreadnought, a newspaper of the suffragettes
- Dreadnought: a History of the Modern Battleship, a 1975 book by Richard Hough
- Dreadnought, a 2010 alternate history steampunk novel by Cherie Priest
- The Lost Fleet: Beyond The Frontier: Dreadnought, a novel in Jack Campbell's The Lost Fleet series
- Dreadnought, a 2017 superhero novel by April Daniels

== Film and television ==
- Under Siege or Dreadnought, a Steven Seagal film
- "Dreadnought", an episode of Star Trek: Voyager
- "Dreadnought", an episode of V: The Series
- Star Dreadnought, a type of star destroyer in the Star Wars films

== Entertainment ==
- Dreadnought (naval wargame), a 1975 wargame published by Simulations Publications, Inc.
- Dreadnoughts (game), a 1992 videogame
- Dreadnought (video game), a 2017 combat flight simulator video game
- Dreadnoughts (video game), a 1992 First World War naval strategy computer game
- Dreadnought Galaxy, a fictional galaxy from the video game Super Mario Galaxy
- Dreadnought (comics), fictional robots from Marvel Comics
- Dreadnought (DC Comics), fictional villain from DC Comics

== Rail ==
- Dreadnought, a GWR 3031 Class locomotive between 1891 and 1915
- LNWR Dreadnought Class, a class of 2-2-2-0 compound locomotives designed by F. W. Webb
- The Lancashire & Yorkshire Railway Class 8 locomotives were nicknamed Dreadnoughts
- The Lancashire & Yorkshire Railway Hughes 4-6-4T tank engines were called Dreadnought tanks
- Dreadnought, a type of suburban railway carriage used on the Metropolitan Railway and London Underground between 1910 and the early 1960s
- Dreadnaught wheel, a wheel with articulated rails attached at the rim to provide a firm footing

== Other uses ==
- Dreadnought hoax, a 1910 English hoax when members of the Bloomsbury Group visited a British battleship disguised as the Emperor of Abyssinia and entourage
- Dreadnought (guitar type)
- Mullahoran GFC Dreadnoughts, a GAA club based in Cavan, Ireland
- Portsmouth Dreadnoughts, an American Football team currently based in Portsmouth, England
- The Dreadnoughts, a Canadian folk punk band
- Wakefield Trinity, an English rugby league football club nicknamed "The Dreadnoughts"
- Dreadnoughts, nickname for heavy work clothing especially on a ship

== See also ==
- Dreadnoks
- Dreadnaught (disambiguation)
- Dreadnoughtus, dinosaur genus
