= Dreadnaught =

Dreadnaught may refer to:

- Dreadnaught (band), a heavy metal band in Melbourne, Australia
- Dreadnaught warship, an "all big gun" battleship
- Dreadnaught (film), a 1981 film by Yuen Woo-Ping
- Dreadnaught USA, an experimental rock band based in New Hampshire, US
- USS Dreadnaught (YT-34), a tug in commission from 1918 to 1922 and in non-commissioned service from 1922 to 1944
- Dreadnaught wheel, a wheel with articulated rails attached at the rim to provide a firm footing
- Dreadnought (guitar type), a large acoustic guitar
- Beyond the Frontier: Dreadnaught, a novel by Jack Campbell
- "Dreadnaught", a song by Machinae Supremacy from Deus Ex Machinae
- Dreadnought (Star Trek: Voyager), an episode of Star Trek: Voyager

== See also ==
- Edward Boscawen or "Old Dreadnaught" (1711–1761), Admiral in the Royal Navy
- HMS Dreadnought (1906), a revolutionary "all big gun" British battleship
- Dreadnought (disambiguation)
