= Space Western =

Subgenre of science fiction

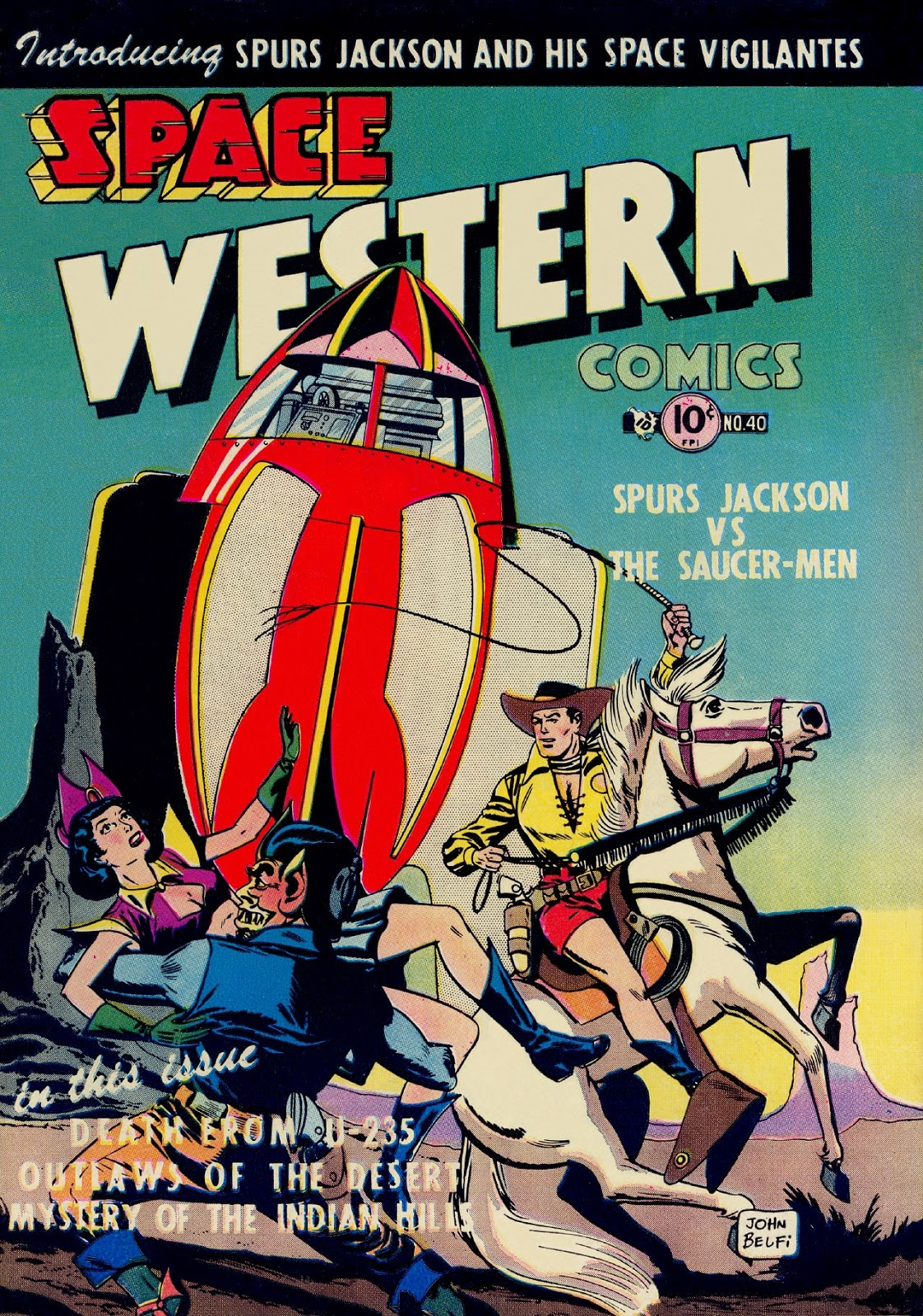
Early space Western print media (1952).

Space Western is a subgenre of science fiction that uses the themes, tropes, or archetypes of Westerns within science-fiction stories in an outer space setting. Subtle influences may include exploration of new, lawless frontiers, while more overt influences may feature actual cowboys in outer space who use rayguns and ride robotic horses. Although initially popular, a strong backlash against perceived hack writing caused the genre to become a subtler influence until the 1980s, when it regained popularity. A further critical reappraisal occurred during the 2000s due to critical acclaim for Firefly.

== Setting ==
The space Western is a science fiction story that contains Western genre elements within an outer space setting. These Western themes can be explicit, such as cowboys in outer space, or they can be a more subtle influence in space opera. The genre can be contrasted with science fiction Western, which generally relies on traditional Western frontier settings. while the space Western, having its roots in science fiction, contains plots, tropes, or archetypes of the Western genre, but is generally set in outer space in a futuristic setting.

Gene Roddenberry described Star Trek: The Original Series as a space Western (or, more poetically, as "Wagon Train to the stars"). Firefly and its cinematic follow-up Serenity literalized the Western aspects of the genre popularized by Star Trek: it used frontier towns, horses, and the styling of classic John Ford Westerns. Worlds that have been terraformed may be depicted as presenting similar challenges as that of a frontier settlement in a classic Western. Six-shooters and horses may be replaced by ray guns and rockets.

The idea is that the vast distances of space have formed barriers, forcing people to become independent or even restricted. Popular themes within the genre are new frontiers in the galaxy and trying to "control" the vast expanse of space. The stories focus on the hardship and adventure of the unexplored space frontier.

== Definitions by contrast ==
Space Westerns sometimes intertwine with space opera and military science fiction and are generally placed within the space warfare in science fiction sub-genre thematic. Specifically written space Western fiction, movies and TV series are sometimes based on established space opera franchises with the expanded universes of Star Wars and Star Trek. They often consider and view an interstellar war and oppression of a galactic empire as a backdrop, with a focus on lone gunslingers in space wielding a raygun with fantastic fictional technologies in a futuristic space-frontier setting.

== History ==
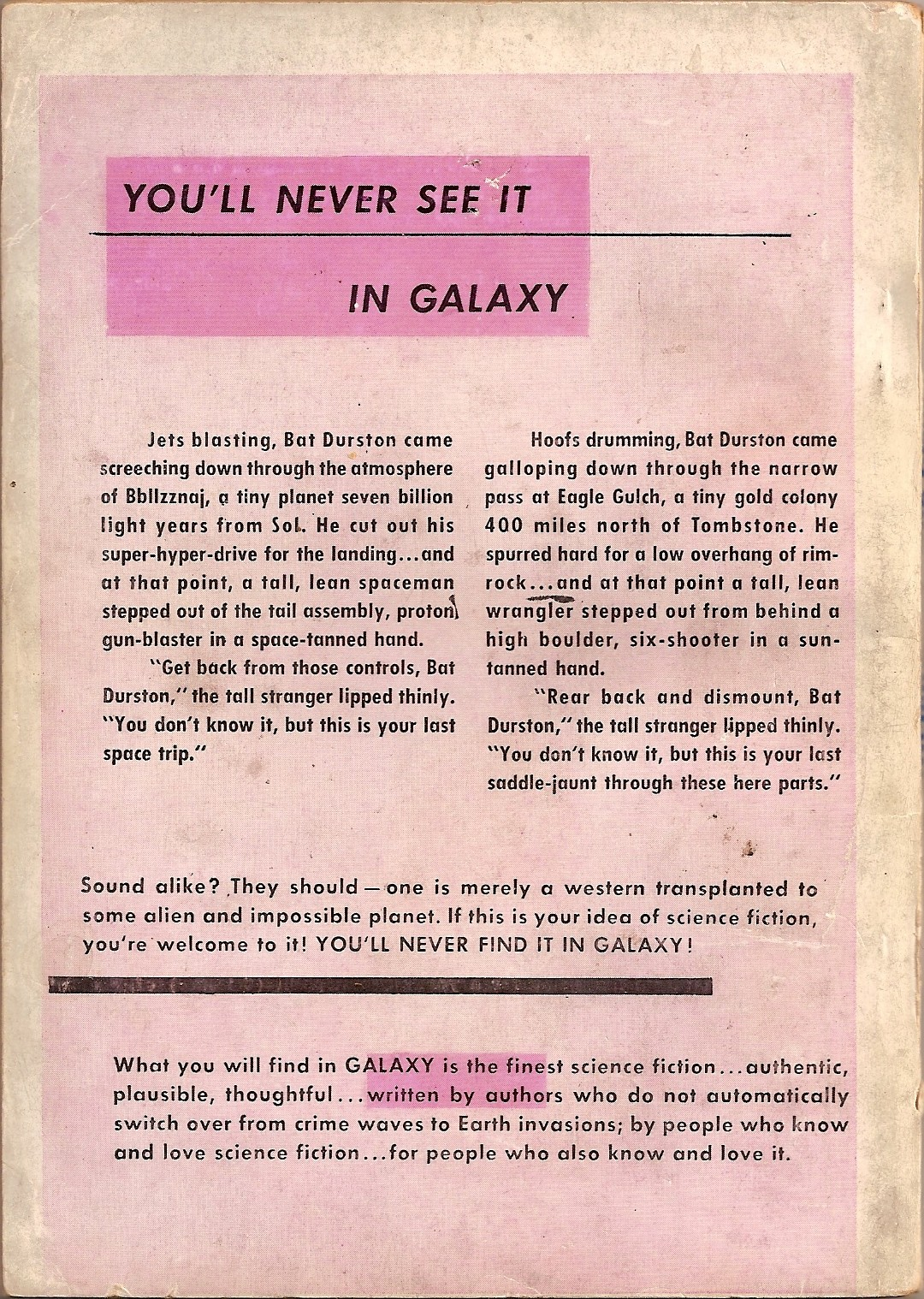
Rear cover of first issue of Galaxy featuring criticism of the space Western subgenre

Westerns influenced early science-fiction pulp magazines. Writers would submit stories in both genres, and science-fiction magazines sometimes mimicked Western cover art to showcase parallels. In the 1930s, C. L. Moore created one of the first space Western heroes, Northwest Smith. Buck Rogers and Flash Gordon were also early influences. After superhero comics declined in popularity in 1940s United States, Western comics and horror comics replaced them. When horror comics became untenable with the Comics Code Authority in the mid-1950s, science-fiction themes and space Westerns grew more popular.

By the mid-1960s, classic Western films fell out of favor and revisionist Westerns supplanted them. Science-fiction series such as Lost in Space and Star Trek presented a new frontier to be explored. Peter Hyams, director of Outland, said that studio heads in the 1980s were unwilling to finance a Western, so he made a space Western instead. Outland took the plot directly from High Noon (1952) and placed it on Jupiter's moon Io.

Space operas such as the Star Wars film series took strong cues from Westerns. Boba Fett, Han Solo and the Mos Eisley cantina, in particular, were based on Western themes. George Lucas attributes the character of Boba Fett to the Man with No Name in the DVD commentary on The Empire Strikes Back. Han Solo's original costume and charming rogue gunslinger mannerisms also reflects the Western's influence on Star Wars. These science fiction films and television series offered the themes and morals that Westerns previously did.

This frontier view of the future is only one of many ways to look at space exploration, and not one embraced by all science-fiction writers. The Turkey City Lexicon, a document produced by the Turkey City science-fiction writers' workshop, condemns the space Western as the "most pernicious" form of a pre-established background that avoids the necessity of creating a fresh world. Galaxy Science Fiction ran an advertisement on its back cover, "You'll never see it in Galaxy", which gave the beginnings of make-believe parallel Western and science-fiction stories featuring a character named Bat Durston. The genre of space Westerns has been informally—and often derisively—known as "Bat Durston" stories since. Such scathing attacks on the subgenre, along with further attacks on space operas, caused a perception that all space Westerns were by definition hack writing and not "true" science fiction. Although the underlying themes remained influential, this bias persisted until the 1980s, when the release of the film Outland and children's cartoons such as BraveStarr and The Adventures of the Galaxy Rangers re-popularized explicit themes of cowboys in space.

BraveStarr chronicles the adventures of the Space Marshal, as he seeks to uphold law and order in the 23rd century. The opening trailer of The Adventures of the Galaxy Rangers shows Texas Rangers–like heroes riding across a prairie landscape on robotic horses. Spaceships and six-guns both feature prominently throughout.

In the 1990s, Japanese manga and anime series such as Trigun (1995 debut), Outlaw Star (1996 debut) and Cowboy Bebop (1997 debut) explored the genre. Several years later, Firefly won acclaim, further causing a critical reassessment of space Westerns.

Games such as StarCraft, The Outer Worlds, RimWorld, and the Borderlands series have popularized the space Western theme. Films like The Chronicles of Riddick have continued the space Western theme.
