= The Lost Fleet: Victorious =

2010 novel by John G. Hemry

- First Edition Book Cover
- Author: Jack Campbell
- Cover artist: Peter Bollinger
- Language: English language
- Series: The Lost Fleet
- Genre: Military science fiction
- Publisher: Ace Books
- Publication date: April 27, 2010
- Publication place: United States
- Pages: 352 (Paperback)
- ISBN: 978-0-441-01869-7
- Preceded by: The Lost Fleet: Relentless
- Followed by: Beyond the Frontier: Dreadnaught

The Lost Fleet: Victorious, is a military science fiction novel by Jack Campbell, pseudonym for John G. Hemry, released on April 27, 2010. Victorious is the sixth and final volume in Hemry's The Lost Fleet series, though not the last book featuring Captain John "Black Jack" Geary.

== Plot ==
Having returned his fleet to Alliance space, Jack "Black Jack" Geary is brought before the Alliance senate, and is nearly arrested as it is assumed that he is returning as a conquering hero, planning to usurp control of the Alliance as a dictator. Instead, Captain Geary briefs the Alliance Senate on the entire journey of the fleet, as well as the alien race that was strongly implied to exist, including the fact that the aliens have established system killing devices, in the form of every hypernet gate in existence, in Alliance and Syndic territory. A captured Syndic CEO confirms the existence of the alien race, and that they've been responsible for the total destruction of every human they've encountered, and have begun to encroach aggressively into Syndic territory.

Geary is promoted to Admiral of the Fleet, and attacks the Syndic homeworld and force a cease fire. The Syndic Executive Council, attempts to use their homeworld's hypernet gate to destroy Geary's fleet but are quickly overthrown. Immediately afterward, a Syndic system bordering the area of space occupied by the aliens arrives, claiming an evacuation ultimatum has been issued by the aliens. The aliens are dubbed the Enigma race because despite a century of contact, not a single thing is known about the alien race.

Geary, realizing that the aliens taking the system would effectively condemn half of the system population to probable death, elects to intervene. The alien armada arrives, apparently outnumbering Black Jack's fleet by 3 to 1. After realizing that the aliens are continuing to use extensive computer manipulation on the Alliance, finds that the Fleet actually outnumbers the aliens 2 to 1, and Geary destroys the alien fleet.

Returning to Alliance space, Admiral Geary abdicates his Admiralty, awards himself a month of leave, and races after Captain Desjani, quickly proposes marriage. Desjani accepts, and the two plan their wedding aboard the civilian transport Desjani was about to travel to Kosatka, and to honeymoon on her homeworld.
