= Energy weapon =

Energy weapon may refer to:

- Directed-energy weapon, a real-life energy weapon used in the military and law enforcement
  - Raygun, a fictional gun-type energy weapon
- Energy sword, a fictional sword-type energy weapon
- Force field (technology), a fictional shield-type energy weapon
