= John G. Hemry =

American military science fiction writer (born 1956)

- Hemry at Dragon Con 2026 in Atlanta, GA
- Born: April 14, 1956 (age 70)
- Occupation: Author
- Children: 3
- Writing career
- Pen name: Jack Campbell
- Period: 1997–present
- Genres: Science fiction, steampunk, military science fiction
- Website: www.johnghemry.com

John G. Hemry (LCDR, USN ret.; born April 14, 1956), is an American author of military science fiction novels. Drawing on his experience as a retired United States Navy officer, he has written the Stark's War and Paul Sinclair series. Under the name Jack Campbell, he has written twenty-one volumes of The Lost Fleet series and the steampunk/fantasy The Pillars of Reality series. He has also written over a dozen short stories, many published in Analog magazine, and a number of non-fiction works.

Hemry has continued the Lost Fleet series with a spin-off: Beyond the Frontier, focusing on the main characters from the Lost Fleet. A second series, called The Lost Stars, focuses on the collapse of the Syndicate Worlds.

== Awards and honors ==
- Winner of 2006 Anlab vote for best short story

== Publications ==
=== As John G. Hemry ===
==== Stark's War ====
The series follows a conflict between US Army soldiers and their leadership during a campaign that takes place on the Moon. Faced with increasingly outrageous disregard for their survival, the enlisted soldiers mutiny under the leadership of Sergeant Stark, who then faces an uncertain path in dealing with the civilian colony they are based next to, as well as the Pentagon and US government.

1. Stark's War (April 2000)
2. Stark's Command (April 2001)
3. Stark's Crusade (March 2002)

==== Paul Sinclair (JAG in Space) ====
The publisher promotes this series descriptively as "JAG, set in space". The title character is a junior officer aboard the USS Michaelson, a military spaceship in peacetime conditions. While he faces the trials of maturing as a line officer, Sinclair also serves as his commanders' legal advisor—a role that brings him into close contact with the military legal system.

1. A Just Determination (May 2003)
2. Burden of Proof (March 2004)
3. Rule of Evidence (March 2005)
4. Against All Enemies (March 2006)

==== Short fiction ====
- Hemry, John G. (October 1997). "One Small Spin". Marion Zimmer Bradley's Fantasy. A4.
- — (September 1997). "One Small Spin". Analog. CXVII (9).
- — (February 1999). "Odysseus". Analog. CXX (2).
- — (November 2000). "Interstellar Navigation". Analog.
- — (November 2000). "Crow's Feat". Analog.
- — (May 2001). "Down the Rabbit Hole". Analog. CXXI (5).
- — (December 2002). "Generation Gap". Analog. 122 (12).
- — (September 2003). "Section Seven". Analog. 123 (9).
- — (December 2004). "Small Moment in Time". Analog. 124.
- — (November 2004). "Mightier than the Sword". Turn the Other Chick. 124.
- — (April 2005). "Standards of Success". Analog. 125 (4).
- — (June 2005). "Working on Borrowed Time". Analog. 125 (6).
- — (April 2006). "Lady Be Good". Analog. 126.
- — (April 2007). "As You Know, Bob". Analog. 127 (4).
- — (Jul–Aug 2007). "Do No Harm". Analog. 127 (7&8).
- — (Nov 2007). "These Are the Times". Analog. 127 (11).
- — (Jan–Feb 2009). "Rocks". Analog. 129 (1&2): 72–76.
- — (Jul–Aug 2009). "Failure to Obey". Analog. 129 (7&8): 94–124.
- — (April 2010). "Swords and Saddles". Analog. 130 (4): 8–36.
- — (October 2010). "The Rift". Analog. 130 (10): 8–36.
- — (March 2011). "Betty Knox and Dictionary Jones in the Mystery of the Missing Teenage Anachronisms". Analog.
- — (2011). "Dawn's Last Light". By Other Means anthology. 3.
- — (April 2012). "Hel's Half-Acre". Armored anthology. pb: xix+579.
- — (Jan–Feb 2013). "The War of the Worlds, Book One, Chapter 18 : the Sergeant-Major". Analog. 133 (1&2): 41–49.

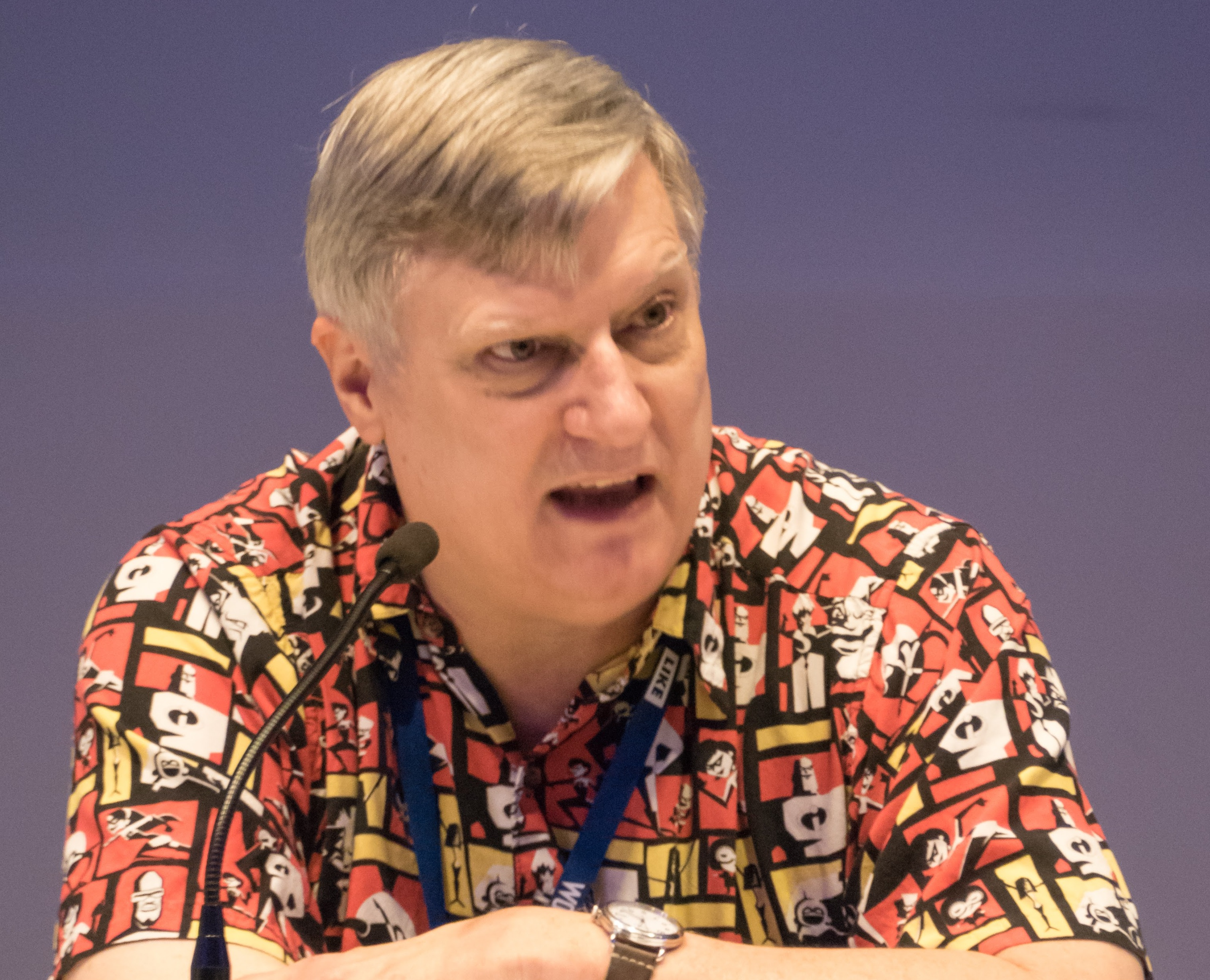
Hemry at the World Science Fiction Convention in Helsinki, 2017

=== As Jack Campbell ===
==== The Lost Fleet ====
1. The Lost Fleet: Dauntless (2006)
2. The Lost Fleet: Fearless (2007)
3. The Lost Fleet: Courageous (2007)
4. The Lost Fleet: Valiant (2008)
5. The Lost Fleet: Relentless (2009)
6. The Lost Fleet: Victorious (2010)

==== The Lost Fleet: Beyond the Frontier ====
Sequel to The Lost Fleet series.

- The Lost Fleet: Beyond the Frontier: Dreadnaught (2011)
- The Lost Fleet: Beyond the Frontier: Invincible (2012)
- The Lost Fleet: Beyond the Frontier: Guardian (2013)
- The Lost Fleet: Beyond the Frontier: Steadfast (2014)
- The Lost Fleet: Beyond the Frontier: Leviathan (2015)

==== The Lost Stars ====
Spin-off of The Lost Fleet series.

- The Lost Stars: Tarnished Knight (2012)
- The Lost Stars: Perilous Shield (2013)
- The Lost Stars: Imperfect Sword (2014)
- The Lost Stars: Shattered Spear (May 2016)

==== The Genesis Fleet ====
Prequel to The Lost Fleet series.

- The Genesis Fleet: Vanguard (2017)
- The Genesis Fleet: Ascendant (2018)
- The Genesis Fleet: Triumphant (2019)

==== Outlands ====
Sequel to The Lost Fleet series.

- Outlands: Boundless (2021)
- Outlands: Resolute (2022)
- Outlands: Implacable (2023)

==== Short stories ====
- "Grendel" (2009)
- "Flèche" (2013)
- "Shore Patrol" (2017)
- "Ishigaki" (2019)

==== The Pillars of Reality ====
- The Dragons of Dorcastle (2015)
- The Hidden Masters of Marandur (2015): "continues a fascinating science fiction story set in a world divided between mechanics, mages, and the common folk"
- The Assassins of Altis (2015)
- The Pirates of Pacta Servanda (2016)
- The Servants of the Storm (2016)
- The Wrath of the Great Guilds (2016)

==== The Legacy of Dragons ====
Sequel to The Pillars of Reality series

- Daughter of Dragons (Audible: Feb 2017)
- Blood of Dragons (Audible: Aug 2017)
- Destiny of Dragons (Audible: Jan 2018)

==== Empress of the Endless Sea ====
Prequel to The Pillars of Reality series.

- Pirate of the Prophecy (Audible: Mar 2020)
- Explorer of the Endless Sea (Audible: Mar 2020)
- Fate of the Free Lands (Audible: Mar 2020)

==== The Doomed Earth ====
- In Our Stars (2024) ASIN B0CG8D92NZ
- Destiny's Way (Due out February 2025) ASIN B0D57TGFRT

==== Collections ====
- Ad Astra (2013) ISBN 978-1-62567-032-8
- Borrowed Time (2013) ASIN B00BFGSDIY
- Swords and Saddles (2013) ASIN B00BFGS8EI
- Rendezvous with Corsair (2024) ISBN 978-1625676559

==== Other ====
- The Last Full Measure (2013) ISBN 978-1-59606-568-0
- The Sister Paradox (2017) ISBN 978-1-942990-40-6
