= Stun gun =

Stun gun may refer to:

== Weapons ==
- Captive bolt pistol, a tool used to stun animals prior to slaughter
- Directed-energy weapon, a ranged weapon that damages its target with highly focused energy without a solid projectile
- Electroshock weapon—a stun gun being a particular type of less-lethal handheld device within the broader category of electroshock weapons, incapacitating weapons that function by applying an electric shock to a target, stun guns in particular operated and used to produce pain compliance
- Various weapons in science fiction

== Other uses ==
- Nickname of South Korean mixed martial artist Dong Hyun Kim (born 1981)
