= The Lost Fleet: Dauntless =

2006 novel by John G. Hemry

- Author: Jack Campbell
- Cover artist: Pat Turner
- Language: English
- Series: The Lost Fleet
- Genre: Science fiction
- Publisher: Ace Books
- Publication date: June 27, 2006
- Publication place: United States
- Media type: Print (Paperback)
- Pages: 293
- ISBN: 0-441-01418-6
- OCLC: 70229285
- Dewey Decimal: 813/.6 22
- LC Class: PS3553.A4637 L67 2006
- Followed by: The Lost Fleet: Fearless

The Lost Fleet: Dauntless is a science fiction novel by American writer Jack Campbell, the first in his The Lost Fleet series, published in 2006. Dauntless sets the stage for the six novel saga about a fleet of over 200 ships trapped deep behind enemy lines and cut off from traveling to their home territory.

== Plot summary ==
John 'Black Jack' Geary has recently been rescued from a 100-year-old escape pod with a damaged beacon. He was the commanding officer of an early battle in what has become a century-old war between the Syndicate Worlds and the Alliance. His last actions in that battle led to his immortalization as a hero of the Alliance people and fleet, which by the time of the book has become blown out of proportion.

Still feeling weak from being frozen for 100 years, Geary arrives at what is supposed to be a decisive battle for the Alliance against the Syndicate. The battle turns out to be a trap and as the leaders of the fleet board a shuttle to negotiate surrender, the Admiral calls on Geary to lead the fleet if anything should happen to him. Geary, assuming that the old laws of war still apply and that nothing ill would happen to his leaders, accepts. Mere hours later after the Admiral is executed, he finds himself in command of 200 ships that have been badly beaten and are cut off from retreat.

Having been frozen while the hypernet technology was invented Geary realizes that while the faster hypernet gates are blocked, the Syndicate ships have left the old jump points unguarded. Geary commands his ships to feint then run for those jump points. In the process he loses a ship commanded by his great nephew who stayed behind to buy time for the fleet to jump.

After the first jump, Geary has to establish command over people who naturally assume they should be leading the fleet. With the last one hundred years of war having been one of severe attrition, few of the officers and crew surviving under him have any experience with tactics or chain of command. The whole fleet is run as a democracy with captains vying for votes in the decision-making process. Geary abolishes this practice and exerts his authority and in the end creates enemies within his own fleet.

Despite all of this he manages to teach a majority of the fleet how to fight in complicated but powerful formations, how to respect authority and how to use the jump point system of travel. Cut off from the hypernet and on the run, Geary still manages to win victories against the Syndicates who are in pursuit. Decisively winning battle after battle Geary gains the trust and adoration of many of his subordinates, and angers his enemies.

The story ends with the fleet still on the run, but working ever closer to home while evading and confronting the enemy as needed.

== Sources ==
- Campbell, Jack (2006). The Lost Fleet: Dauntless. New York: Ace Books. p. 304. ISBN 0441014186.
