= The Lost Fleet: Valiant =

2008 novel by John G. Hemry

- First edition
- Author: Jack Campbell
- Cover artist: Peter Bollinger
- Language: English
- Series: The Lost Fleet
- Genre: Science fiction
- Publisher: Ace Books
- Publication date: June 24, 2008
- Publication place: United States
- Media type: Print (Paperback)
- Pages: 284
- ISBN: 0-441-01619-7
- OCLC: 183267553
- LC Class: CPB Box no. 2812 vol. 17
- Preceded by: The Lost Fleet: Courageous
- Followed by: The Lost Fleet: Relentless

The Lost Fleet: Valiant is a science fiction novel by American writer Jack Campbell, published in 2008. It is the fourth book in The Lost Fleet series.

== Plot summary ==
Not sure what to expect after the heavy damage the Syndicate's inflicted on his fleet when they escaped 11 days before, John 'Black Jack' Geary discovers the Lakota system is practically undefended with nothing left behind but warships too badly damaged to participate in the fleet chasing him.

The Alliance fleet quickly gains control of the system and lays a trap for the pursuing Syndicate Fleet. When the Syndicates arrive 5 hours later, they fall for the lure of unprotected auxiliaries and quickly get decimated by Geary's plan to explode the cores of the abandoned Syndic ships left in the system.

When the surviving Syndicate leaders realize their huge pursuit fleet has been destroyed, they order the two remaining Syndic battleships guarding the hypernet jump gate to destroy it. The resulting explosion unleashes a large nova-like explosion that destroys practically everything in the system except for the Alliance fleet which only suffers minor damage. Meanwhile, Geary and Victoria Rione end their relationship with Rione feeling that Geary actually is in love with Captain Tanya Desjani.

Captain Geary jumps to the Branwyn Star System where he finds no threats to his fleet. Right before jumping to Wendig, he receives a message about a computer worm in the jump engines which would have left his ship and a few others trapped in jump space forever. Geary now realizes that his enemies within the Alliance fleet are getting desperate and are willing to take whatever means necessary to remove him and his supporters.

In the Wendig Star System, they discover the Syndicates Leaders have abandoned the system, but left 500 civilians to die on the main planet as their life support fails. Believing no one should die like that, Captain Geary orders the civilians to be rescued. Before the shuttles arrive at the planet, another worm is discovered, this time targeting the weapons systems to have them destroy the civilians. The worm is blocked and the citizens of the Wendig Alpha surrender themselves to the Alliance fleet and heads towards the Cavalos jump point.

Ten days later, in the Cavalos Star System, Captain Geary safely delivers the Wendig citizens and faces off against another fleet of Syndicate warships. Emerging victorious, he captures a Syndicate CEO and gets him to admit that there is an alien civilization on the other side of Syndic space. Geary lets the CEO go after making a deal with him about working together to end the war. Later Geary and Desjani admit to each other their feelings for each other but realize that as long as Geary is her commanding officer they can never be together. Desjani also fervently believes that Geary has a mission from the living stars themselves to end the war and he must complete this also before they can be together.

== Sources ==
- Campbell, Jack (2008). The Lost Fleet: Valiant. New York: Ace Books. p. 304. ISBN 978-0-441-01619-8.
