= The Lost Fleet: Fearless =

2007 novel by John G. Hemry

- Cover book art.
- Author: Jack Campbell
- Cover artist: Pat Turner
- Language: English
- Series: The Lost Fleet
- Genre: Science fiction
- Publisher: Ace Books
- Publication date: January 30, 2007
- Publication place: United States
- Media type: Print (Paperback)
- Pages: 295
- ISBN: 978-0-441-01476-7
- LC Class: CPB Box no. 2675 vol. 16
- Preceded by: The Lost Fleet: Dauntless
- Followed by: The Lost Fleet: Courageous

The Lost Fleet: Fearless is a science fiction novel by American writer Jack Campbell, published in 2007. It is the second book in The Lost Fleet series.

== Plot summary ==
This is the second book in the Lost Fleet series that follows the adventures of Black Jack Geary. This novel begins with Geary and the fleet arriving in the Sutrah system. Disobeying orders, four of the ships of the Alliance Fleet break formation and blindly charge after a pair of obsolete Syndic ships, not knowing that a minefield trap had been laid. Despite Geary's attempt to recall them, the ships fly right into the mine field. During a meeting after the incident, Geary is indirectly accused of cowardice because of the incident by officers such as Captains Numos and Faresa who still oppose and resent his command of the fleet. As the Allied Fleet is planning to raid the system for resources, it is discovered that there is a prison colony on one of the planets containing Alliance prisoners of war. Upon liberating the POWs, it is discovered that among them is a former hero of the Alliance, Captain Falco, who believes he and not Geary should command the fleet, and who has secret allies among the officers under Geary's command.

Tensions quickly rise between Geary and Falco when Falco attempts to use his political muscle to assume command of the fleet; first, by advocating a return to the inhumane policies of the war upheld before Geary's return during a private and uninvited conference, and then by attempting to work with other officers to undermine Geary's authority. When that fails, Falco manages to escape the flagship Dauntless and travel to the battleship Warrior, captained by the inept and timid Captain Kerestes, who is all but replaced as commander by Falco. Falco then rallies support with other fleet captains still resentful of Geary and leads a 39-ship strong mutiny, taking a direct path back to Alliance space that Geary has already evaluated as a suicide run, as Syndic forces will eventually concentrate overwhelming forces against them.

With the fleet divided, Geary takes the loyalist bulk of the fleet to the Syndic industrial hub of Sancere; having a hypernet gate, he correctly assumes that Syndic forces will not defend the system as they assess the Alliance fleet would not risk a raid into a Syndic stronghold even deeper in Syndic space. Finding the system defended only by ships under repair or in training, Geary despatches a strike force led by Furious that draws the main forces off and then crushes them as the rest of the fleet makes a dash for the hypernet gate, destroying military and industrial targets along the way.

However, he discovers that the hypernet gate has the potential if destroyed to release a nova-sized energy blast that would destroy all life in Sancere and the fleet as well. His worst fears are realised when Syndicate guard units fire on the gate, causing it to fail. Left with no other options, Geary elects to evacuate the fleet to relative safety in-system while a select few ships including Dauntless remain at the gate to implement an experimental counterforce bombardment to neutralise the destructive chain reaction devised by Commander Cresida. The bombardment works; the ships sustain damage from the event but its force is massively reduced and not a single vessel or life is lost.

After raids on food warehouses by the Alliance marine detachment, in which they combat special forces and secure additional supplies, and the conclusion of repairs, the fleet exits to Ilion where Geary has determined that any survivors from Falco's doomed charge will seek to retreat from the Syndic forces pursuing them. He is proved correct; but levels the playing field by mining the jump point once the survivors arrive. Warrior and a third of the mutineers arrive at Ilion; Geary and Desjani are further angered when the battleships Warrior, Orion and Majestic leave their lighter comrades to seek shelter in the fleet first.

The Syndic pursuers arrive and are taken by complete surprise; despite numerical superiority, Geary again uses his knowledge of lost combat tactics to completely rout the attacking force. However, tragedy strikes when the battle cruiser Terrible is obliterated in a near-lightspeed collision with a Syndic battle cruiser and the mutinying ship Invincible has to be scuttled due to battle damage.

Falco, Numos, Faresa and Kerestes are given a chance to defend themselves during the post-battle conference; however, as predicted by Duellos, Falco has lost all sense of reality, believing himself to first be commander of the fleet and then attempting to address the Alliance senate; clearly unfit for command or trial, he is confined to his cabin and Numos, Faresa and Kerestes are arrested for mutiny despite Geary nearly succumbing to his 'Black Jack' persona and ordering summary executions, and the fleet moves on to Baldur.
