= The Lost Fleet: Relentless =

2009 novel by John G. Hemry

- First edition
- Author: Jack Campbell
- Cover artist: Peter Bollinger
- Language: English
- Series: The Lost Fleet
- Genre: Science fiction
- Publisher: Ace Books
- Publication date: April 28, 2009
- Publication place: United States
- Media type: Print (Paperback)
- Pages: 320
- ISBN: 0-441-01708-8
- OCLC: 268794833
- Preceded by: The Lost Fleet: Valiant
- Followed by: The Lost Fleet: Victorious

The Lost Fleet: Relentless is a science fiction novel by American writer Jack Campbell, the fifth book in The Lost Fleet series. It was published in 2009.

== Plot summary ==
The plot of Relentless picks up in Dilawa. John 'Black Jack' Geary, commander of the fleet, after much deliberation, mostly due to struggling with potential losses regardless of his decision, sets the fleet on a course to Heradao, a system that is holding many Alliance POW's. After a fleet engagement and a lengthy land battle, during which the Syndicate system planets all rebel and plunge into a civil war, Geary manages to free many of the prisoners, despite suicidal attack attempts, including nuclear strikes against the camp.

After recovering the prisoners and available supplies, Geary sets course for Padronis, only after learning of a massive "reserve flotilla" fleet of Syndicate ships that the Syndicate had held in reserve to fight off the still unseen alien race. Shortly after arriving at Padronis, another sabotage attempt is made, this time claiming heavy cruiser Lorica and nearly battle cruiser Dauntless herself. After receiving vital information from Commander Gaes, Geary unmasks the traitor during a fleet conference, as well as the identity of a second participant, and despite attempts by Captain Kila to silence her collaborators, Geary manages to capture several of the main saboteurs, though the leading dissenter, Captain Kila, herself manages to commit suicide rather than face a trial of her peers.

Arriving at the Atalia star system, Geary comes across the aftermath of a fleet action between the reserve flotilla and a fleet of Alliance warships. Continuing to be true to his word, Geary accepts the pseudo-defection of a Syndicate commander, who informs him that the hypernet gate at Kalixa, the system where her ship had initially been stationed, spontaneously exploded, utterly destroying all human life in the system, though the Syndicate officer believes the Alliance to be responsible for purposefully using the gate as a weapon of mass destruction.

Finally jumping to Varandal, Geary leads a successful attack against the Syndicate fleet, managing to prevent them from making a retaliatory strike using the Alliance hypernet gate. This is the moment he unites with his grandniece Jane Geary, captain of Dreadnaught. Dreadnaught plays an important part in holding off the Syndic attack on the hypernet gate. After the Syndicate fleet flees, Geary puts his fleet, at this point nearly completely out of munitions, fuel, and overloaded with rescued POWs, in for refitting and repair.

== Literary significance and reception ==
On April 28, 2009, Locus reported that Relentless was selling well enough to be rated 68 on Amazon.com. On May 12, 2009, Locus also reported that Relentless was #16 on The New York Times mass market best seller list, and #108 at USA Today bestseller list.
