= The Lost Fleet =

Military science fiction novel series by John G. Hemry

The Lost Fleet is a military science fiction series written by John G. Hemry under the pen name Jack Campbell. The series is set one-hundred-plus years into an interstellar war between two different human cultures, the Alliance and the Syndicate. The protagonist of the story is discovered floating in a suspended animation escape pod one hundred years after he made a "heroic last stand" against an enemy fleet. In his absence, he has been made into a renowned hero in the Alliance, but his legend and actions are used to justify poor tactics and decisions. Awakened after being discovered during a secret mission that turns out to be an enemy trap, he is suddenly dropped into the role of fleet commander and expected to live up to the legend that has grown around him.

The initial series begun with Dauntless in 2006 ended with Victorious in 2010. The author, however, has continued the Lost Fleet series with three spin-offs: Beyond the Frontier, focusing on the main characters from the Lost Fleet; The Lost Stars, focusing on the Syndicate Worlds; Outlands, picking up where Leviathan leaves off; as well as a prequel series, The Genesis Fleet.

== Novels ==
The Lost Fleet

This is the main book series. It has been published first.

| # | Title | Pages | Publication date | ISBN |
|---|---|---|---|---|
| 1 | The Lost Fleet: Dauntless | 304 | June 27, 2006 | ISBN 978-0857681300 |
| 2 | The Lost Fleet: Fearless | 295 | January 30, 2007 | ISBN 978-0857681317 |
| 3 | The Lost Fleet: Courageous | 299 | December 18, 2007 | ISBN 978-0857681324 |
| 4 | The Lost Fleet: Valiant | 284 | June 24, 2008 | ISBN 978-0857681331 |
| 5 | The Lost Fleet: Relentless | 336 | April 28, 2009 | ISBN 978-0441017089 |
| 6 | The Lost Fleet: Victorious | 352 | April 27, 2010 | ISBN 978-0857681355 |

The Lost Fleet - Beyond the Frontier

Sequel of the main series.

| # | Title | Pages | Publication date | ISBN |
|---|---|---|---|---|
| 7 | Beyond the Frontier: Dreadnaught | 356 | April 26, 2011 | ISBN 978-0441020379 |
| 8 | Beyond the Frontier: Invincible | 389 | May 1, 2012 | ISBN 978-1937007454 |
| 9 | Beyond the Frontier: Guardian | 416 | May 7, 2013 | ISBN 978-0425260500 |
| 10 | Beyond the Frontier: Steadfast | 386 | May 6, 2014 | ISBN 978-0425260524 |
| 11 | Beyond the Frontier: Leviathan | 323 | May 5, 2015 | ISBN 978-0425260548 |

The Lost Fleet - Outlands

The second sequel series. This is the most recent work of the author.

| # | Title | Pages | Publication date | ISBN |
|---|---|---|---|---|
| 12 | Outlands: Boundless | 336 | May 18, 2021 | ISBN 978-0593198964 |
| 13 | Outlands: Resolute | 384 | June 28, 2022 | ISBN 978-0593198995 |
| 14 | Outlands: Implacable | 368 | July 4, 2023 | ISBN 978-1789096187 |

The Lost Stars

Spin-off series.

| # | Title | Pages | Publication date | ISBN |
|---|---|---|---|---|
| 1 | The Lost Stars: Tarnished Knight | 390 | October 2, 2012 | ISBN 978-1937077822 |
| 2 | The Lost Stars: Perilous Shield | 406 | October 1, 2013 | ISBN 978-0425256312 |
| 3 | The Lost Stars: Imperfect Sword | 369 | October 7, 2014 | ISBN 978-0425272251 |
| 4 | The Lost Stars: Shattered Spear | 342 | May 3, 2016 | ISBN 978-0425272275 |

The Genesis Fleet

This is a prequel trilogy written after the main series was finished.

| # | Title | Pages | Publication date | ISBN |
|---|---|---|---|---|
| 1 | The Genesis Fleet: Vanguard | 327 | May 16, 2017 | ISBN 978-1101988343 |
| 2 | The Genesis Fleet: Ascendant | 336 | May 15, 2018 | ISBN 978-1101988374 |
| 3 | The Genesis Fleet: Triumphant | 336 | May 21, 2019 | ISBN 978-1101988404 |

== Plot summary ==
=== The Lost Fleet ===
The Alliance has been fighting the Syndicate Worlds (a union of planets under a tyrannical, corporate-like government) for a century. After obtaining a "hypernet key" from a Syndic traitor, they send a large fleet through a hypernet gate to directly attack the Syndic home-world, but are ambushed by overwhelming Syndic forces.

During the approach to the Syndic home-world, the fleet discovers the escape pod of Captain John Geary in an abandoned star system. Known as "Black Jack" in the present, his legendary exploits are taught to every schoolchild and he is revered for his heroic last stand in the early days of the war. The Black Jack Geary legend includes the expectation that one day he will return from the dead to lead the Alliance fleet to victory. Left as de facto fleet commander, and with great reluctance, Geary takes it upon himself to lead the fleet to the safety of Alliance space.

Geary is also forced to retrain the fleet to fight in formation instead of the "modern" free-for-all tactics of charging straight at the enemy, supposedly inspired by Geary's example at his famous last stand, caused by decades of attrition and loss of experience. Geary's attempt to change the fleet's culture causes tension with other senior officers, including one egomaniacal senior captain freed from a Syndic labor camp with a reputation almost as famous as Geary's, who proceeds to split off a portion of the fleet on a disastrous mission.

To complicate the situation, a third faction wishes to stage a military coup upon the return of the fleet to Alliance space with Geary as dictator. Geary resists the temptation offered by this faction with great effort, though they continue to apply pressure to him throughout the series.

As the entire military force of the Syndicate Worlds continues to hunt the Alliance fleet, Geary is often forced to raid Syndic star systems for supplies and raw materials. During these raids, the fleet gradually uncovers evidence of a third party in this war. Geary believes they are an unknown alien civilization who may have tricked the Syndics into starting the war with the Alliance. These aliens may even have been responsible for humans "discovering" the hypernet and may have sinister reasons for giving humans this technology after Geary discovers that a hypernet gate can be used to destroy an entire star system. The hypothetical aliens also have a means of remote destruction of hypernet gates, which will allow them, given time, to extend the war between the humans indefinitely.

The alien civilization, whatever their designs for humanity are, do not appear to want the Alliance fleet to reach their home space. When Geary leads the fleet to attack the Lakota star system, the aliens manipulate the Syndic hypernet to divert a Syndic fleet to the system.

Throughout the series, Geary is troubled by larger issues.

Firstly, he is concerned by the declining state of the Alliance civilian government, which is losing control of its member worlds and the support of the military forces after a century of futile warfare.

Also, even though Geary is unswervingly loyal to the Alliance, he fears that the government may choose to imprison him as a threat to its own power.

In addition, the Alliance Navy itself has allowed its standards to slip, frequently destroying entire planets and their civilian populations in retaliation for Syndic atrocities, murdering prisoners of war, and has ceased saluting and other traditions reaffirming the command structure. Geary therefore fears that the Alliance may not deserve any victory it might achieve.

Combined with these immediate concerns is his speculation that, if the increasingly non-hypothetical aliens are perpetuating the war within human-controlled space, what might their actions be if he can somehow end it?

==== Beyond the Frontier ====
- Beyond the Frontier: Dreadnaught: Admiral "Black Jack" Geary is given command of the "First Fleet" and sent to the far side of space. The series follows Geary as he leads the fleet through previously unexplored star systems, and to explore the threat of the previously encountered non-human "Enigma" race.
- Beyond the Frontier: Invincible: After stumbling upon a second non-human race, which are dubbed the "Bear-Cows" due to their resemblance to teddy bears and their herbivorous nature and herding tendencies, which attack with torpedo-like ships in massive waves and numbers, Admiral Geary jumps farther into unknown space. There, they find a third non-human species, apparently waiting to engage the Bear-Cows. Turning to engage the Bear-Cows with the new aliens alongside them, Geary defeats the force through luck and the Bear-Cows' inability to divert from a charge, after which Admiral Geary jumps farther into unknown space. There, Admiral Geary and his fleet officially meet the first friendly aliens that humanity has met so far, the Spider-Wolves. With the help of the Spider-Wolves, Admiral Geary and his fleet disable one of the bear-cows' massive super-battleships and capture it, to return to their home in Alliance space, Varendal. Realizing that the Enigma race will note their absence from Midway, Geary intercepts another Enigma race attack at Midway, which the Syndicate Worlds are observing. With assistance from the Spider-Wolves (known afterward as the Dancers), they defeat the Enigma fleet and engage in an uneasy standoff against the Syndicate Worlds force, who demand the surrender of the Bear-Cow super-battleship and the Dancers.
- Beyond the Frontier: Guardian: Furious with the standoff and the Syndicate Worlds' attempt to reconquer Midway, Geary orchestrates a trap for The Syndicate Admiral, tricking him into firing first on a ship under Alliance protection. They defeat the Syndicate Worlds forces but realize that the Syndicate Worlds have managed to shut down their hypernet system, denying the Alliance fleet a quick trip home. With their massive fleet, they drive straight for home, winning numerous small engagements and other asymmetrical warfare attacks, thinly disguised by the Syndicate Worlds to be the work of pirates and other non-official parties. Returning to Varandal, Geary learns that the forces of the Callas Republic and the Rift Federation are on the verge of revolt due to their ridiculously long deployment time, and immediately orders them to return home under radio silence, prohibiting them from receiving contradictory orders. The situation defused, Geary escorts the Dancers to Earth, encountering a splinter fleet of humanity, which arrogantly declares the Earth under their control. Despite being outnumbered 5 to 1, Geary smashes the enemy fleet, which lacked any modern weaponry or understanding of tactics, evidenced by their insistence on attacking in fixed formations. Arriving at Earth, the Dancers land in Kansas, returning the body of an ancient deep space explorer whom they recovered.
- Beyond the Frontier: Steadfast: After the events from the last book; where Geary and the crew of Dauntless escorted the Dancer ships back to old earth to return a human to Kansas. The book then starts with many of the old Earth leaders wanting to show them places on Earth that held significance. On the last night on the planet, they were whisked off by Lady Vitali and made it back to Dauntless. Unfortunately then Lieutenants Castries and Yuon had been kidnapped. The kidnappers land on a proscribed place Europa, the site of the accidental release of an engineered bioweapon. After rescuing his lieutenants, he returns to Alliance space, and leads a task force to safely return Syndic refugees to their system, formerly Syndicate controlled, and escort the Dancer fleet in their return from Alliance space.
- Beyond the Frontier: Leviathan:

==== The Lost Stars ====
The Lost Stars deals with the collapse of the Syndicate Worlds, and specifically the efforts of Midway System's system CEO commander and ground force CEO commander to deal with the aftermath. The series expands the story to include the viewpoint of Syndicate Worlds citizens and how the leaders of the Midway star system react to the collapse of central authority, occurring at the same time as the events in the Beyond the Frontier series.

- The Lost Stars: Tarnished Knight
- The Lost Stars: Perilous Shield
- The Lost Stars: Imperfect Sword
- The Lost Stars: Shattered Spear

==== The Genesis Fleet ====
A prequel to The Lost Fleet series, envisioned as a trilogy detailing the formation of the Alliance, focusing on a number of characters, some of which are ancestors to the protagonists of the main series.

- The Genesis Fleet: Vanguard (published 16 May 2017)
- The Genesis Fleet: Ascendant (published 15 May 2018)
- The Genesis Fleet: Triumphant (published 21 May 2019)

==== Outlands ====
- Outlands: Boundless (published 15 June 2021)
- Outlands: Resolute (published 28 June 2022): Geary rescues the crew of a crippled ship from the Rift Federation, juggles politics and communicates with the Dancers again.
- Outlands: Implacable (published 4 July 2023)

== Major themes ==
Hemry acknowledged in an interview that The Lost Fleet was inspired by Xenophon's Anabasis, detailing the return march of the Ten Thousand, and myths about kings returning to save their nation. In the same interview, Hemry, based on his own military experience, found Geary to be his ideal commanding officer.

Ancestor worship is a belief system fairly homogeneously embraced within Hemry's universe. This allows Hemry to explore a few aspects of the role of religion in military life without making comment on any current or modern religious group. Personnel in the Alliance fleet are mostly believers, and concerned with the morality of their actions in relation to their religious beliefs. In addition, they think a great deal about the afterlife, which makes sense considering that they constantly face death in the line of duty. Religious concerns, prayer, and terminology are infused throughout all aspects of the lives of the sailors and officers in the fleet, and are often included in official communications and events. Some comments from the narration indicate that there are those in the society who have more or less belief in the existence of their ancestors but no characters are openly identified as such.

A primary theme of John Hemry's work as a whole, and the Lost Fleet series in particular, is the importance of the rule of law, particularly military and naval regulations and the laws of war. Specifically, he deals with the proper treatment of enemy combatants, prisoners, civilians, and saboteurs, as well as traitors within one's own organization. The separation of civilian and military authority is also important to the messages the series conveys. Hemry, through John Geary, continually reinforces the concept that military forces must be subordinate to civilian authority, and shows democratic systems of civilian government (the Alliance) to be superior to a commercial-military autocracy (the Syndics). At the same time, the military must follow established systems of rank and seniority, rather than a democratic system which is essential to civil society. The character of Co-President (and Alliance Senator) Victoria Rione gives advice and assistance to Geary when necessary, but does not and cannot give actual orders or dictate military policies.

As with other works by Hemry, relationships are an important aspect of the plots of the novels and the proper expression of romantic interest between military personnel is explored and clearly defined as being strictly controlled by those regulations which concern fraternization. Geary's relationship earlier in the novels with Victoria Rione are legally safe, but politically dangerous. This is in contrast to his relationship later in the novels with Captain Tanya Desjani, an officer who is directly subordinate to Geary as the captain of his flagship, making any romantic situation legally impossible but politically safe within the culture of the fleet. The refusal of Geary and Desjani to act upon any feelings that are legally forbidden continues Hemry's message of the importance of the rule of law and military regulations.

Honor and duty are also strong themes. The double edged nature of honor is explored in the latter half of the series, showing how honor can be both a bulwark against attack, and a knife to one's own throat.

== Reception ==
We Read Science Fiction reviewed the series and gave it a good review, giving positive comments on the narrative and the detailed battle scenes. The only complaint directed at the series in the review was Hemry's tendency to repeat details from earlier books in later books. Hemry himself replied to the review thanking them for their comments and explaining that he repeats information for the readers who picked up later books but have not had the chance to read from the beginning of the series with Dauntless.

== Comic book ==
British company Titan Comics announced the release of an all-new comic series based on The Lost Fleet in October 2016, written by Jack Campbell, penciled by Andre Siregar, inked by Bambang Irawan and coloured by Sebastian Cheng. The first five-issue series, called The Lost Fleet: Corsair, was published from June 2017 to January 2018.

The series is set after the end of a century-old war between the Alliance and the Syndics, and centers on Captain Michael Geary, Black Jack Geary's grand-nephew, who has been MIA since the novel Dauntless.

== Short stories ==
Four The Lost Fleet short stories have been published in various science fiction anthologies. "Grendel" features the battle which saw Geary frozen in suspended animation. "Flèche" covers a battle which a young Desjani fought in. "Shore Patrol" features Geary as a young officer and reveals the origins of his nickname "Black Jack". "Ishigaki" is a standalone story set in the first decade of the Alliance-Syndicate war, following two members of Geary's former crew.
