= Stark's War =

Book series by John G. Hemry

- Stark's War (ISBN 0857688618); Stark's Command (0857688987); Stark's Crusade (0857688995)
- Author: John G. Hemry
- Country: United States
- Language: English
- Genre: Science fiction
- Publisher: Ace Books
- Published: 2000–2002
- Media type: Print (Paperback), Audiobook, E-book
- No. of books: 3
- OCLC: 43961898
- Website: Stark's War Series

Stark's War is the name of a series of military science fiction novels written by John G. Hemry and first published by Ace Books between 2000 and 2002. The books are now being sold with updated cover art highlighting Hemry's nom de plume of Jack Campbell.

The series covers the invasion of the Moon by the military forces of Earth for the resources of the Moon, as the resources of Earth (or The World, as the citizens of the Moon refer to it) are not sufficient to sustain the American economy. Following a disastrous initial invasion, Sergeant Stark, the titular hero of the series, seizes control of the American military forces on the Moon.

== Plot summary ==
=== Stark's War ===
After the initial invasion of the Moon succeeds in results in seizure of the Lunar colony, Sergeant Stark is forced to serve under several incompetent commanders. After the commanding General, Meecham, announces a plan to assault the remaining enemy forces that results in wholesale slaughter of the third division, Stark instigates a coup and leads a counterattack to instigate a well-planned rescue mission to retrieve the surviving friendly forces. Despite protests to the contrary, Sgt. Stark's peer non-coms vote him to be their acting Commander, after a bloodless, but risky coup against the remaining officers. After turning down an offer to be promoted to officer status by the wily General, Stark finds himself in command of almost half of the American ground forces in existence, in a heavily fortified position on the Moon, in a de facto rebellion against the US and Earth.

=== Stark's Command ===
Following the seizure of the entire officer corps of the American military, Stark forms a tentative agreement with the colony government. After repelling a major US offensive, Stark begins to oversee the administrative aspects of his command, including negotiating with the Earth government, which amounts to little more than a demands for unconditional surrender. Following these failures, special forces operatives attempt to assassinate Stark and colony government.

=== Stark's Crusade ===
The novel closes after the final disastrous attack in which Stark teams up with the American reinforcements to defeat the foreign military powers. The stock market takes another massive plunge, and the unrest explodes in outright revolt as the population overthrows the sitting government. Stark and the colony military forces are offered full amnesty and pardon, and immediately roll back a large amount of corporate-written legislation that severely oppressed the colony's population.

== Major themes ==
A major theme of the novel is the separation of the military and civilian portions of the population, and the further separation between the enlisted and officer corps of the American military. Stark himself is considered an anachronism as he was born a civilian and chose to join the military. With few exceptions, officers are portrayed as either bumbling sycophants, intent on obeying the letter of every law, no matter how asinine, and forcing their subordinates to do the same, or as near-tyrannical overlords, who create plans that are full of doubletalk and invented words and are known to not work but are forced through regardless. The other major force are the corporations that attempt to lay claim to the Moon, through the puppets of the generals and the various political figures they are shown to own through thinly veiled bribes in the form of campaign contributions. The sergeants of the enlisted are almost universally smarter, better trained, and the only force that can bring the officer corps' plans to fruition.

In an interview, Hemry stated that Stark "came into being as a fully-formed character, as if born of my frustrations with things I had encountered in the service."

The second major theme is the presence of the media and corporations in war. Rather than be providers of war material, the corporations portrayed use the war as a medium for entertainment, allowing for real time viewing of combat as part of a paid subscription. Part of the rationale for this is that the economy has reached the point where it can no longer expand, and is technically now a failure, and the major corporations, which are always massive, undefined conglomerates, required the constant media exposure to sustain the bottom line, which is reinforced by the corporations' direct control of various military and political figures.
