= USS Dreadnaught =

Tugboat of the United States Navy

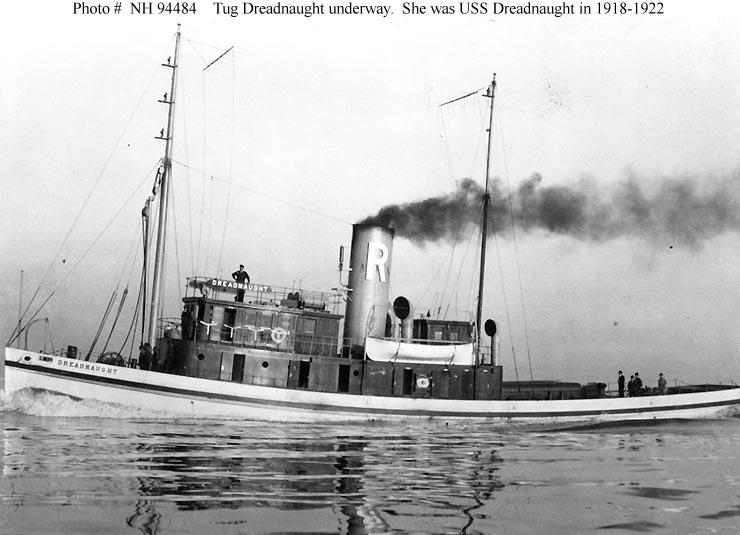
- Dreadnaught as a commercial tug in 1917.

History

United States
- Name: USS Dreadnaught
- Namesake: Previous name retained
- Builder: Union Iron Works, San Francisco, California
- Completed: 1917
- Acquired: 17 May 1917
- Commissioned: 31 January 1918
- Decommissioned: 14 March 1922
- In service: 14 March 1922 (non-commissioned)
- Reclassified: Harbor tug, YT-34, 17 July 1920; Gate tender (non-self propelled), YNG-21, 7 October 1940
- Stricken: September 1944
- Fate: Reportedly destroyed after being stricken
- Notes: Operated as commercial tug Dreadnaught in 1917

General characteristics
- Type: Tug
- Tonnage: 450 gross register tons
- Length: 143 ft (44 m)
- Beam: 28 ft (8.5 m)
- Draft: 14 ft 10 in (4.52 m) aft
- Speed: 11 knots
- Complement: 28
- Armament: 1 × 3-inch (76.2-mm) gun

USS Dreadnaught (ID-1951), later YT-534 and YNG-21, was a United States Navy tug that was in service from 1918 to 1944.

== Construction, acquisition and commissioning ==
Dreadnaught was built as a commercial tug of the same name by Union Iron Works at San Francisco, California, in 1917 for the Rolph Navigation and Coal Company of San Francisco. On 17 May 1917, the U.S. Navy purchased her for use during World War I and assigned her the naval registry identification number 1951. After fitting out at Mare Island Navy Yard at Vallejo, California, she was commissioned as USS Dreadnaught (ID-1951) on 31 January 1918.

== World War I service ==
Departing San Francisco on 27 February 1918 towing coal barges, Dreadnaught delivered the barges at Norfolk, Virginia, on 18 April 1918. She then proceeded to New London, Connecticut, where she arrived on 22 April 1918.

Dreadnaught was assigned to Patrol Force, United States Atlantic Fleet, and departed New London on 25 April 1918 to escort a convoy of submarine chasers to the Azores. On her return passage she aided in towing SS Luckenbach from the Azores to Bermuda and then towed the tug USS Goliah (SP-1494) from Bermuda to New York City, arriving there on 1 July 1918.

Between 6 September 1918 and 18 October 1918, Dreadnaught again escorted a group of submarine chasers from New London to the Azores and returned to New London. On 24 October 1918, she departed New London with a third convoy to the Azores, then proceeded to Brest, France, as escort for the United States Army tug Cuba. During the voyage, World War I ended, on 11 November 1918. The two tugs arrived at Brest on 29 November 1918.

Dreadnaught should not be confused with the patrol vessel USS Dreadnought (SP-584), which also was in commission during World War I.

== Postwar European and Atlantic service ==
Dreadnaught operated on harbor duty at Brest and towed barges and ships between Brest, Lorient, and Bordeaux, France, until 20 March 1919, when she got underway to escort a convoy of submarine chasers to Lisbon, Portugal, and then on to Bermuda. She returned to Ponta Delgada in the Azores on 11 April 1919 for towing duty in the Azores until 29 July 1919. Towing submarine chasers, she returned to New York City on 19 August 1919. On 30 August 1919, she departed New York City for Norfolk, Virginia, with barges in tow, arriving at Norfolk on 1 September 1919. She then underwent an overhaul at Norfolk.

== Service at San Francisco ==
Dreadnaught left Norfolk on 23 January 1920 bound for the Mare Island Navy Yard in Vallejo, California, where she arrived on 15 March 1920 and began another overhaul. When the U.S. Navy adopted its modern hull number system on 17 July 1920, Dreadnaught was classified as a "harbor tug" and redesignated YT-34. She was assigned to the 12th Naval District for duty in the San Francisco area.

On 14 March 1922, Dreadnaught was decommissioned, but she continued her 12th Naval District duties in the San Francisco area for many years after that in a non-commissioned "in-service" status.

Dreadnaught was reclassified as a "gate tender (non-self propelled)" - an anti-submarine barrier gate craft - and redesignated YNG-21 on 7 October 1940.

== Disposal ==
In September 1944, Dreadnaught was stricken from the Navy List. She reportedly was destroyed sometime thereafter.
