= Dreadnoughts (video game) =

1992 video game

- Developer(s): Dr. Peter Turcan
- Publisher(s): Turcan Research Systems
- Platform(s): Amiga, Atari ST, Acorn Archimedes, MS-DOS
- Release: 1992
- Genre(s): Ship simulation, strategy

Dreadnoughts was a First World War naval strategy computer game by Turcan Research Systems, and available in Amiga, Atari ST, Acorn Archimedes and MS-DOS formats.

== Gameplay ==

Players could choose to play as The Royal Navy or Imperial German Navy and can re-fight several real and fantasy naval battles from the war including:-

- Battle of Coronel (With or without HMS Canopus present)
- Battle of the Falkland Islands
- Battle Of Dogger Bank
- Battle Of Jutland

Players may fight against each other, or against the computer and command their forces by typing in commands and sending them to the required ships or squadrons to carry out.

There was also an option to watch a computer v computer battle.

== Reception ==
A 1993 Computer Gaming World survey of wargames gave the game two-plus stars out of five, calling it "interesting, albeit very slow".

== See also ==
- Naval warfare
- Harpoon (series)
