= Weapons in science fiction =

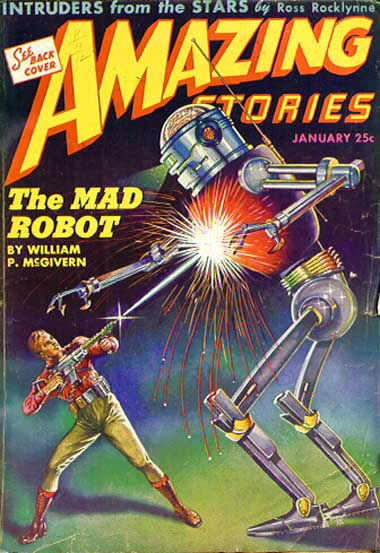
Fictional rayguns are often depicted in science fiction.

Strange and exotic weapons are a recurring feature in science fiction. In some cases, weapons first introduced in science fiction have been made a reality; other science-fiction weapons remain purely fictional, and are often beyond the realms of known physical possibility.

At its most prosaic, science fiction features an endless variety of sidearms—mostly variations on real weapons such as guns and swords. Among the best-known of these are the phaser—used in the Star Trek television series, films, and novels—and the lightsaber and blaster—featured in Star Wars movies, comics, novels, and TV shows.

Besides adding action and entertainment value, weaponry in science fiction sometimes touches on deeper concerns and becomes a theme, often motivated by contemporary issues. One example is science fiction that deals with weapons of mass destruction.

== In early science fiction ==
Weapons of early science-fiction novels were usually bigger and better versions of conventional weapons, effectively more advanced methods of delivering explosives to a target. Examples of such weapons include Jules Verne's "fulgurator" and the "glass arrow" of the Comte de Villiers de l'Isle-Adam.

A classic science-fiction weapon, particularly in British and American science-fiction novels and films, is the raygun. A very early example of a raygun is the Heat-Ray featured in H. G. Wells' The War of the Worlds (1898).

The discovery of X-rays and radioactivity in the last years of the 19th century led to an increase in the popularity of this family of weapons, with numerous examples in the early 20th century, such as the disintegrator rays of George Griffith's future-war novel The Lord of Labour (1911). Early science-fiction film often showed raygun beams giving off bright light and loud noise like lightning or large electric arcs.

Wells also prefigured modern armored warfare with his description of tanks in his 1903 short story "The Land Ironclads", and aerial warfare in his 1907 novel The War in the Air.

== Lasers and particle beams ==
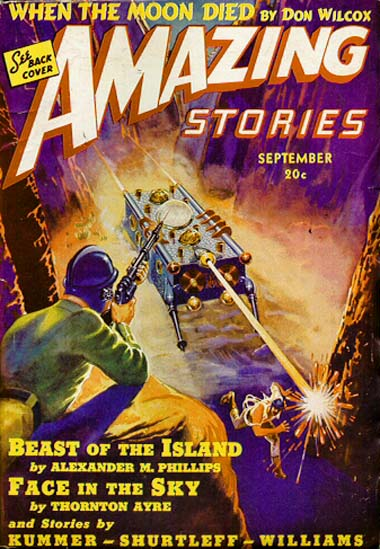
A laser tank weapon in a 1939 edition of Amazing Stories

Arthur C. Clarke envisaged particle beam weapons in his 1955 novel Earthlight, in which energy would be delivered by high-velocity beams of matter.

After the invention of the laser in 1960, it briefly became the death ray of choice for science-fiction writers. For instance, characters in the Star Trek pilot episode The Cage (1964) and in the Lost in Space TV series (1965–1968) carried handheld laser weapons.

By the late 1960s and 1970s, as the laser's limits as a weapon became evident, the raygun began to be replaced by similar weapons with names that better reflected the destructive capabilities of the device. These names ranged from the generic "pulse rifle" to series-specific weapons, such as the phasers from Star Trek. According to The Making of Star Trek, Gene Roddenberry claimed that production staff realized that using laser technology would cause problems in the future as people came to understand what lasers could and could not do; this resulted in the move to phasers on-screen, while letting lasers be known as a more primitive weapon style.

In the Warhammer 40,000 franchise, a human faction known as the Imperial Guard has a "lasgun", which is described as being a handheld laser weapon, as their main weapon, and larger cannon versions being mounted onto tanks and being carried around by Space Marines. The elf-like Aeldari, meanwhile, have a special unit called the Swooping Hawks equipped with a "lasblaster".

In the Command & Conquer video game series, various factions make extensive use of laser and particle-beam technology. The most notable are the GDI Ion Cannon from Command and Conquer: Tiberium Dawn, Allied Prism Tank from Red Alert 2 and Athena Cannon from Red Alert 3, the Nod's Avatar and Obelisk of Light from Tiberium Wars, as well as various units from Generals constructed by USA faction, including their "superweapon" particle cannon.

== Plasma weaponry ==
Weapons using plasma (high-energy ionized gas) have been featured in a number of fictional universes, such as Halo and the Warhammer 40k franchise.

== Weapons of mass destruction ==
Nuclear weapons are a staple element in science-fiction novels. The phrase "atomic bomb" predates their existence, and dates back to H. G. Wells's The World set free (1914), when scientists had discovered that radioactive decay implied potentially limitless energy locked inside of atomic particles (Wells's atomic bombs were only as powerful as conventional explosives, but would continue exploding for days on end). Cleve Cartmill predicted a chain-reaction-type nuclear bomb in his 1944 science-fiction story "Deadline", which led to the FBI investigating him, due to concern over a potential breach of security on the Manhattan Project.

The use of radiological, biological, and chemical weapons is another common theme in science fiction. In the aftermath of World War I, the use of chemical weapons, particularly poison gas, was a major worry, and was often employed in the science fiction of this period, for example Neil Bell's The Gas War of 1940 (1931). Robert A. Heinlein's 1940 story "Solution Unsatisfactory" posits radioactive dust as a weapon that the US develops in a crash program to end World War II; the dust's existence forces drastic changes in the postwar world. In The Dalek Invasion of Earth, set in the 22nd century, Daleks are claimed to have invaded Earth after it was bombarded with meteorites and a plague wiped out entire continents.

A subgenre of science fiction, postapocalyptic fiction, uses the aftermath of nuclear or biological warfare as its setting.

The Death Star is the Star Wars equivalent to a weapon of mass destruction, and as such, might be the most-well-known weapon of mass destruction in science fiction.

== Cyberwarfare and cyberweapons ==
The idea of cyberwarfare, in which wars are fought within the structures of communication systems and computers using software and information as weapons, was first explored by science fiction.

John Brunner's 1975 novel The Shockwave Rider is notable for coining the word "worm" to describe a computer program that propagates itself through a computer network, used as a weapon in the novel. William Gibson's Neuromancer coined the phrase cyberspace, a virtual battleground in which battles are fought using software weapons and counterweapons. The Star Trek episode "A Taste of Armageddon" is another notable example.

Certain Dale Brown novels place cyberweapons in different roles. The first is the "netrusion" technology used by the U.S. Air Force. It sends corrupt data to oncoming missiles to shut them down, as well as hostile aircraft by giving them a "shutdown" order in which the systems turn off one by one. It is also used to send false messages to hostiles, to place the tide of battle in the favor of America. The technology is later reverse-engineered by the Russian Federation to shut down American antiballistic missile satellites from a tracking station at Socotra Island, Yemen.

Cyberwarfare has moved from a theoretical idea to something that is now seriously considered as a threat by modern states.

In a similar but unrelated series of incidents involved various groups of hackers from India and Pakistan who hacked and defaced several websites of companies and government organizations based in each other's country. The actions were committed by various groups based in both countries, but not known to be affiliated with the governments of India or Pakistan. The cyber wars are believed to have begun in 2008 following the Mumbai attacks believed to be by a group of Indian cyber groups hacking into Pakistani websites. Hours after the cyber attacks, a number of Indian websites (both government and private) were attacked by groups of Pakistani hackers, claiming to be retaliation for Indian attacks on Pakistani websites. The back and forth attacks have persisted on occasions since then.

== War on the mind ==
Themes of brainwashing, conditioning, memory-erasing, and other mind-control methods as weapons of war feature in much science fiction of the late 1950s and 1960s, paralleling the contemporary panic about communist brainwashing, existence of sleeper agents, and the real-world attempts of governments in programs such as MK-ULTRA to make such things real.

David Langford's short story "BLIT" (1988) posits the existence of images (called "basilisks") that are destructive to the human brain, which are used as weapons of terror by posting copies of them in areas where they are likely to be seen by the intended victims. Langford revisited the idea in a fictional FAQ on the images, published by the science journal Nature in 1999. The neuralyzer from the Men in Black films are compact objects that can erase and modify the short-term memories of witnesses by the means of a brief flash of light, ensuring that no one remembers encountering either aliens or the agents themselves.

The TV series Dollhouse (2009) features technology that can "mindwipe" people (transforming them into "actives", or "dolls") and replace their inherent personalities with another one, either "real" (from another actual person's mind), fabricated (for example, a soldier trained in many styles of combat and weaponry, or unable to feel pain), or a mixture of both. In a future timeline of the series, the technology has been devised into a mass weapon, able to "remote wipe" anyone and replace them with any personality. A war erupts between those controlling actives, and "actuals" (a term to describe those still retaining their original personas). An offshoot technology allows actual people to upload upgrades to their personas (such as fighting or language skills), similar to the process seen in The Matrix, albeit for only one skill at a time.

== Parallels between science-fiction and real-world weapons ==
Some new forms of real-world weaponry resemble weapons previously envisaged in science fiction. The early 1980s-era Strategic Defense Initiative, a proposed missile defense system intended to protect the United States from attack by ballistic strategic nuclear weapons (Intercontinental ballistic missiles and submarine-launched ballistic missiles), gained the popular name "Star Wars" after the popular franchise created by George Lucas.

In some cases, the influence of science fiction on weapons programs has been specifically acknowledged. In 2007, science-fiction author Thomas Easton was invited to address engineers working on a DARPA program to create weaponized cyborg insects, as envisaged in his novel Sparrowhawk.

Active research on powered exoskeletons for military use has a long history, beginning with the abortive 1960s Hardiman powered exoskeleton project at General Electric, and continuing into the 21st century. The borrowing between fiction and reality has worked both ways, with the power loader from the film Aliens resembling the prototypes of the Hardiman system.

American military research on high-power laser weapons started in the 1960s, and has continued to the present day, with the U.S. Army planning, as of 2008, the deployment of practical battlefield laser weapons. Lower-powered lasers are currently used for military purposes as laser target designators and for military rangefinding. Laser weapons intended to blind combatants have also been developed, but are currently banned by the Protocol on Blinding Laser Weapons, although low-power versions designed to dazzle rather than blind have been developed experimentally. Gun-mounted lasers have also been used as psychological weapons, to let opponents know that they have been targeted to encourage them to hide or flee without having to actually open fire on them.

== See also ==
- Post-apocalyptic fiction
- Autonomous weapon
- List of fictional military robots
- List of Star Wars weapons
- Military science fiction
- Space warfare in fiction
- Spy-fi (subgenre)
- Weapons in Star Trek
