= USS Dreadnought =

Patrol vessel of the United States Navy

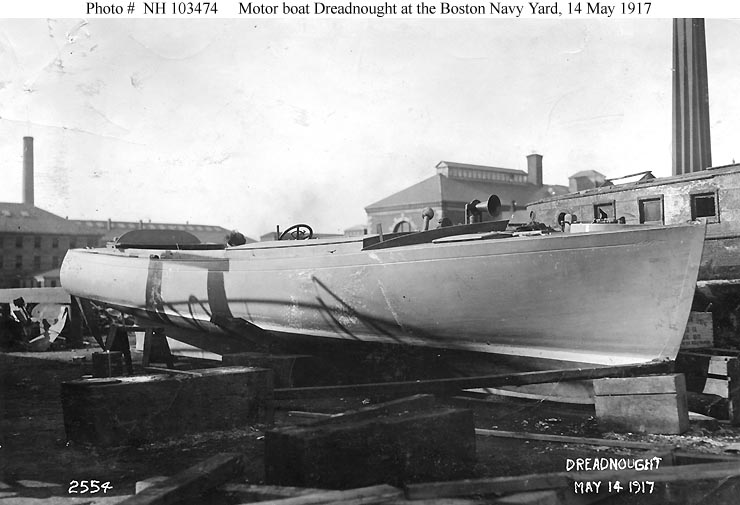
- Dreadnought as a private motorboat, hauled out of the water at the Boston Navy Yard in Boston, Massachusetts, on 14 May 1917, three days prior to her acquisition by the United States Navy.

History

United States
- Name: USS Dreadnought (1917-1918); USS SP-584 (1918-1919)
- Namesake: Dreadnought was her previous name retained; SP-584 was her section patrol number
- Builder: R. Bigelow, Monument Beach, Massachusetts
- Completed: 1916 or 1917
- Acquired: 17 May 1917
- Commissioned: 20 October 1917
- Renamed: SP-584 in 1918
- Fate: Returned to owner 6 June 1919
- Notes: Operated as private motorboat Dreadnought 1916-1917 and from 1919

General characteristics
- Type: Patrol vessel
- Tonnage: 10 gross register tons
- Length: 56 ft (17 m)
- Beam: 9 ft 6 in (2.90 m)
- Draft: 3 ft 6 in (1.07 m) aft
- Speed: 11.3
- Complement: 7
- Armament: 1 × 1-pounder gun; 1 × machine gun

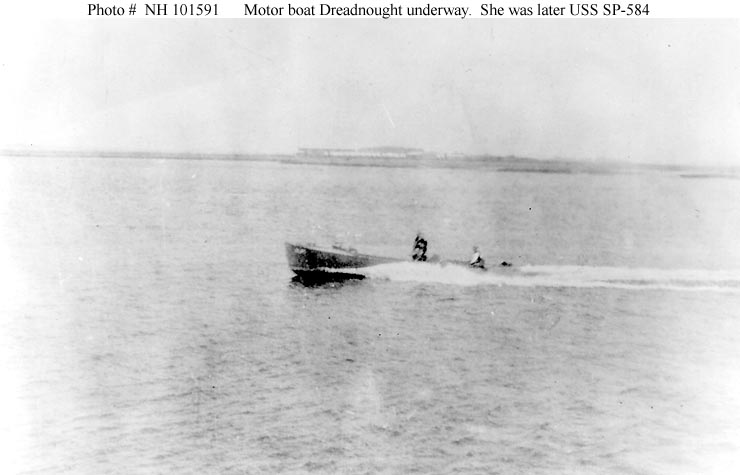
Dreadnought underway at high speed in 1917, probably prior to her U.S. Navy service.

USS Dreadnought (SP-584), later USS SP-584, was a United States Navy patrol vessel in commission from 1917 to 1919.

Dreadnought was built as a private fast "runabout" motorboat of the same name by R. Bigelow at Monument Beach, Massachusetts, in either 1916 or 1917. On 17 May 1917, the U.S. Navy acquired her from her owner, Eldon B. Keith of Brockton, Massachusetts, for use as a section patrol boat during World War I. She was commissioned as USS Dreadnought (SP-584) on 20 October 1917.

Assigned to the 5th Naval District, Dreadnought carried out patrol duties there for the rest of World War I. In 1918, she was renamed USS SP-584.

SP-584 was returned to her owner on 6 June 1919.

Dreadnought should not be confused with the tug USS Dreadnaught (ID-1951), later AT-34, which was in commission at the same time.
