= Military science fiction =

Military subgenre of science fiction

Military science fiction is a subgenre of science fiction that depicts the use of science fiction technology, including spaceships and weapons, for military purposes. It usually features principal characters who are members of a military organization, often during a war occurring sometimes in outer space or on a different planet or planets. It exists in a range of media, including literature, comics, film, television and video games.

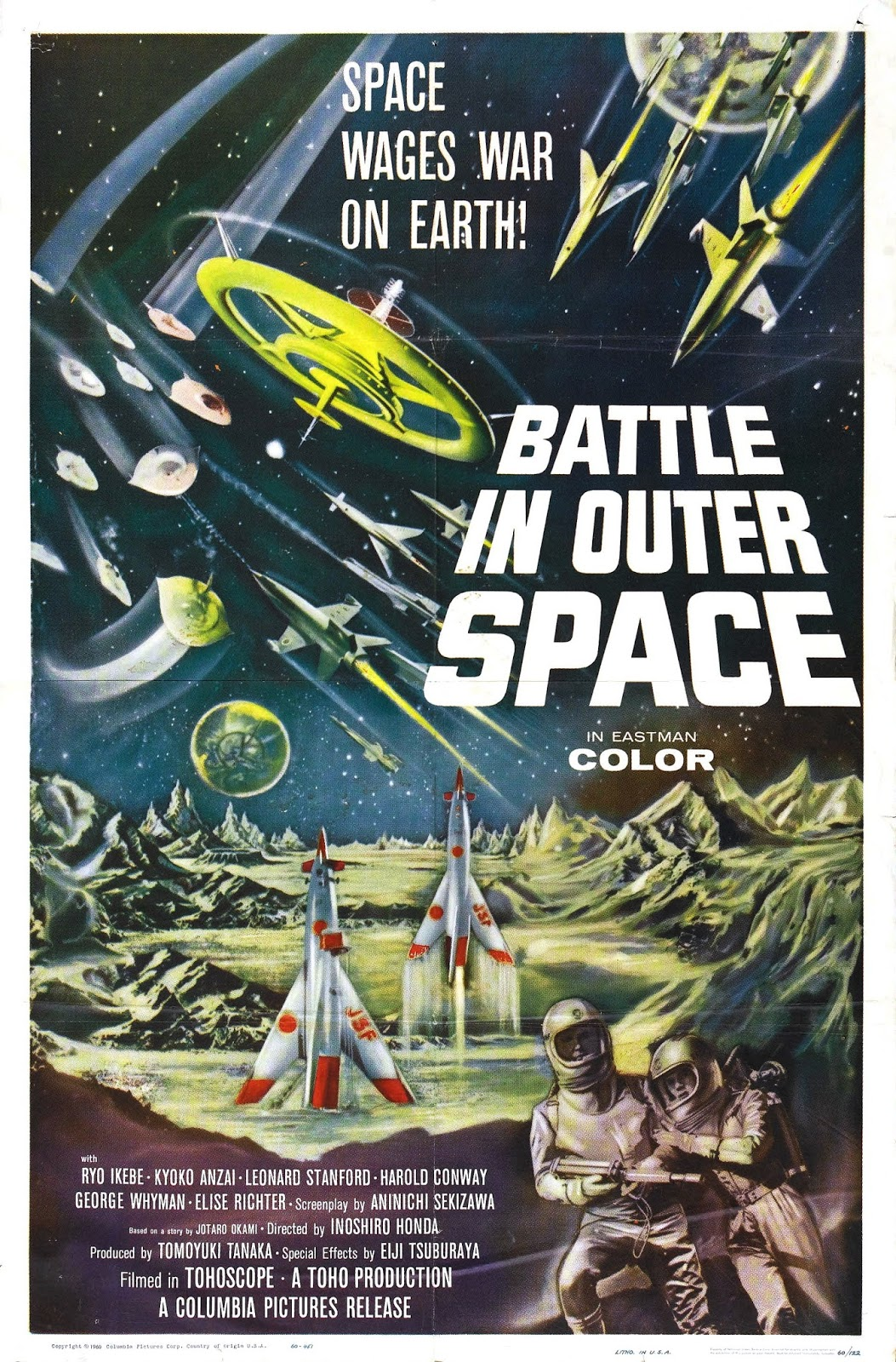
A poster for a science fiction film depicts space battles, Battle in Outer Space (1959).

The basis for a typical work of military science fiction is a detailed description of the conflict and its belligerents (sometimes extraterrestrials), tactics and weapons, and the role of a military service and the individual members of that military organization. The stories often use features of actual past or current Earth conflicts, with countries being replaced by planets or galaxies with similar characteristics, battleships replaced by space battleships, small arms and artillery replaced by lasers, soldiers replaced by space marines, and certain events changed so the author can extrapolate what might have occurred.

== Characteristics ==
Traditional military values of courage under fire, sense of duty, honor, sacrifice, loyalty and camaraderie are often emphasized. The action is typically described from the point of view of a soldier in a science fictional setting of battle or near battle. Typically, the technology is more advanced than that of the present and described in detail. In some stories, however, technology is fairly static, and weapons that would be familiar to present-day soldiers are used, but other aspects of society have changed. Technology may not be emphasized in such stories as much as other aspects of the characters' military lives, cultures or societies. For example, women may be accepted as equal partners for combat roles, or preferred over men.

When the "extravagan[t]" depictions of war in space operas faded along with pulp fiction more generally, military science fiction developed with a "more disciplined and more realistic notion of the kind of armies which might fight interplanetary and interstellar wars, and the kinds of weapons they might use".

In many stories, the usage or advancement of a specific technology plays a role in advancing the plot, such as deploying a new weapon or spaceship. Some works draw heavy parallels to human history and how a scientific breakthrough or new military doctrine can significantly change how war is fought, the outcome of a battle, and the fortunes of the combatants. Many works explore how human progress, discovery and suffering affect military doctrine or battle, and how the protagonists and antagonists reflect on and adapt to such changes.

Many authors have either used a galaxy-spanning fictional empire as a background for the story, or have explored the growth and/or decline of such an empire. The capital of a galactic empire is sometimes a "core world," such as a planet relatively near a galaxy's centrally located supermassive black hole, which has advanced considerably in science and technology compared to current human civilization. Characterizations of these empires can vary wildly from malevolent forces that attack sympathetic victims to apathetic or amoral bureaucracies, to more reasonable entities focused on social progress.

A writer may posit a form of faster-than-light travel in order to facilitate the enormous scale of interstellar war. The long spans of time (e.g. decades or centuries) required for human soldiers to travel interstellar distances, even at relativistic speeds, and the consequences for the characters, is a dilemma examined by authors such as Joe Haldeman and Alastair Reynolds. Other writers such as Larry Niven have created plausible interplanetary conflict based on human colonization of the asteroid belt and outer planets by means of technologies that use the laws of physics as currently understood.

== Definitions by contrast ==
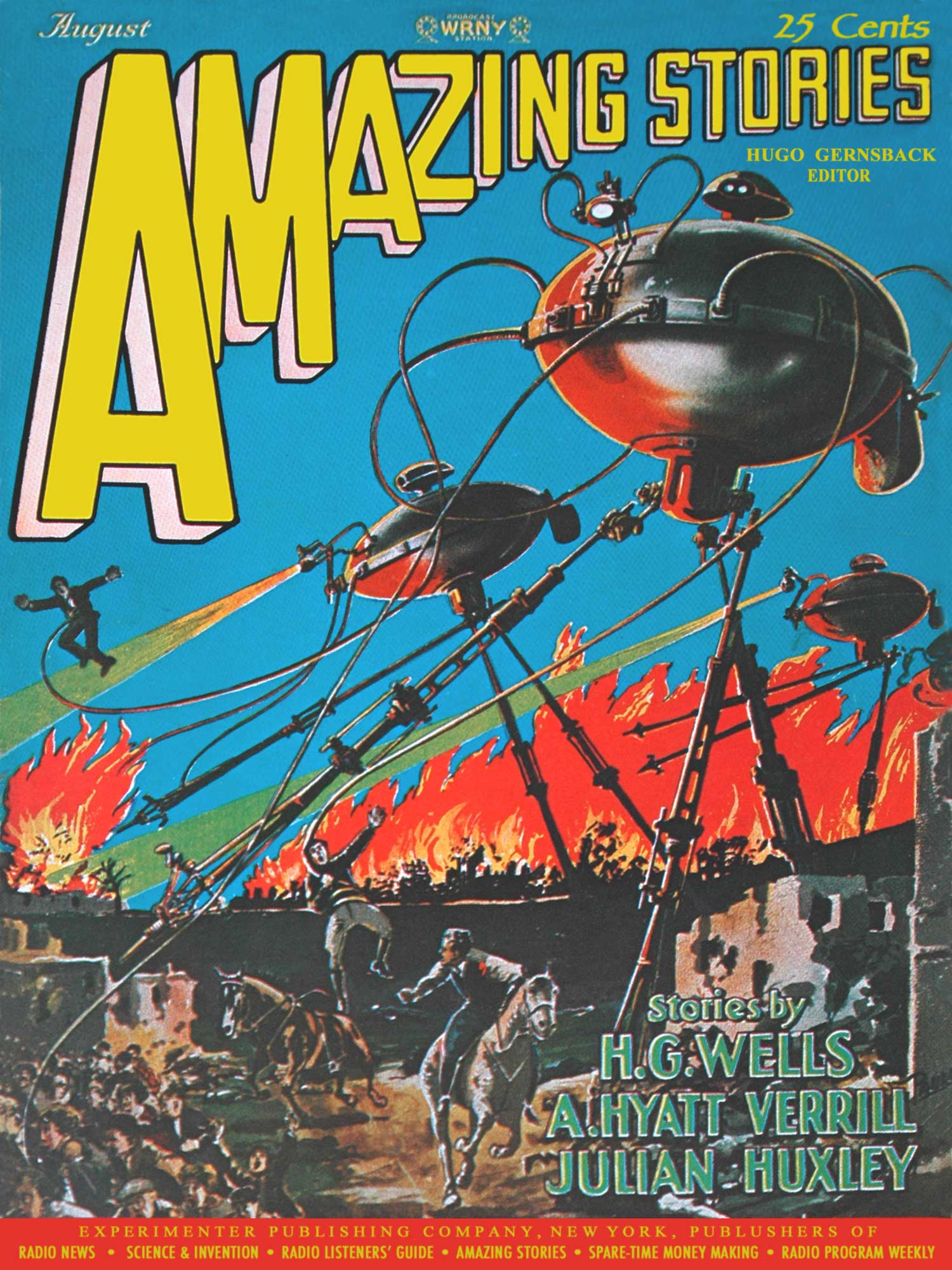
The August 1927 cover of Amazing Stories depicts H. G. Wells' War of the Worlds. (illustrated by Frank R. Paul).

Several subsets of military science fiction share characteristics of the space opera subgenre, concentrating on large-scale space battles with futuristic weapons in an interstellar war. Many stories can be considered to be in one or both the military science fiction and space opera subgenres, such as The Sten Chronicles by Allan Cole and Chris Bunch, Ender's Game series by Orson Scott Card, Honorverse by David Weber, Deathstalker by Simon R. Green, and Armor by John Steakley.

At one extreme, a military science fiction story can speculate about war in the future, in space, or involving space travel, or the effects of such a war on humans; at the other, a story with a fictional military plot may have relatively superficial science fictional elements. The term "military space opera" may occasionally denote this latter style, as used for example by critic Sylvia Kelso when describing Lois McMaster Bujold's Vorkosigan Saga. Examples that feature aspects of both military science fiction and space opera include the Battlestar Galactica franchise and Robert A. Heinlein's 1959 novel Starship Troopers.

A key distinction of military science fiction from space opera is that space operas focus more on adventurous stories and melodrama, while military science fiction focuses more on warfare and technical aspects. The principal characters in a space opera are also not military personnel but civilians or paramilitary. Stories in both subgenres often concern an interstellar war in which humans fight each other and/or nonhuman entities. Military science fiction, however, is not necessarily set in outer space or on multiple worlds, as in space opera and the space Western.

Both military science fiction and the space Western may consider an interstellar war and oppression by a galactic empire as the story's backdrop. They may focus on a lone gunslinger, soldier or veteran in a futuristic space frontier setting. Western elements and conventions in military science fiction may be explicit, such as cowboys in outer space, or more subtle, as in a space colony requiring defense against attack out on the frontier. Gene Roddenberry described Star Trek: The Original Series as a Space Western (or more poetically, as "Wagon Train to the stars"). The TV series Firefly and its cinematic follow-up Serenity literalized the Western aspects of the space Western subgenre as popularized by Star Trek: it features frontier towns, horses and a visual style evocative of classic John Ford Westerns. Worlds that have been terraformed may be depicted as presenting similar challenges to those of a frontier settlement in a classic Western. Six-shooters and horses may be replaced by ray guns and rockets.

A "thematic subdivision" of MSF are works where "ex-military protagonists [are] drawing on their battle experience for tough and violent operations in (more or less) civilian life", typically in a law enforcement setting. Some examples include Richard Morgan's Takashi Kovacs book such as Altered Carbon (2002) and Elizabeth Bear's Jenny Casey books, such as Hammered (2004).

== History ==
=== 19th century and up to early 20th century ===
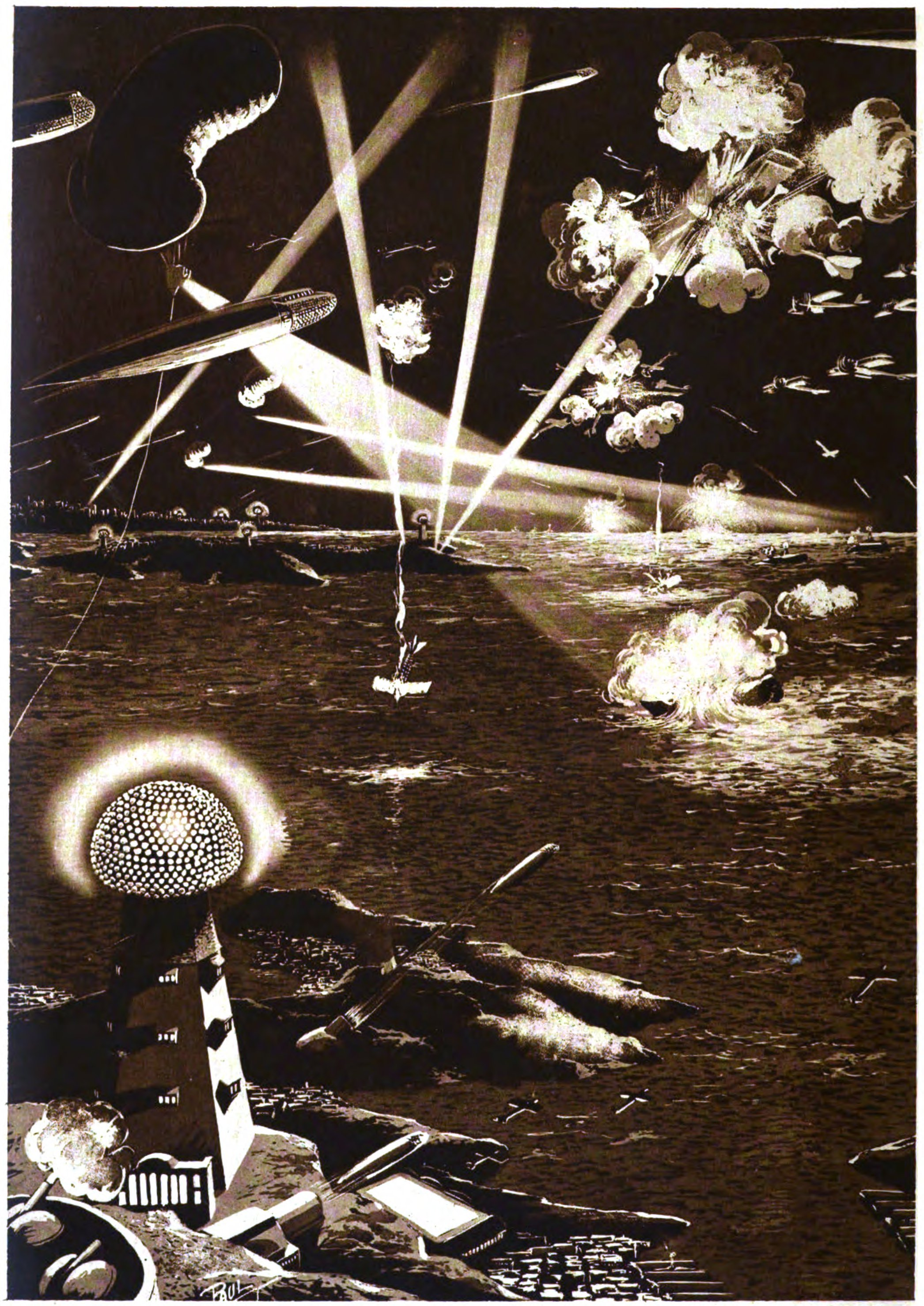
A 1922 illustration, drawn by illustrator Frank R. Paul, of inventor Nikola Tesla's speculative vision of what war will be like in the future, as described by him.

Precursors for military science fiction can be found in "future war" stories dating back at least to George Chesney's story "The Battle of Dorking" (1871). Written just after the Prussian victory in the Franco-Prussian War, it describes an invasion of Britain by a German-speaking country in which the Royal Navy is destroyed by a futuristic wonder-weapon ("fatal engines").

Other works of military science fiction followed, including H.G. Wells's "The Land Ironclads". It described tank-like "land ironclads," 80-to-100-foot-long (24 to 30 m) armoured fighting vehicles that carry riflemen, engineers, and a captain, and are armed with semi-automatic rifles.

=== Post-WWII era ===
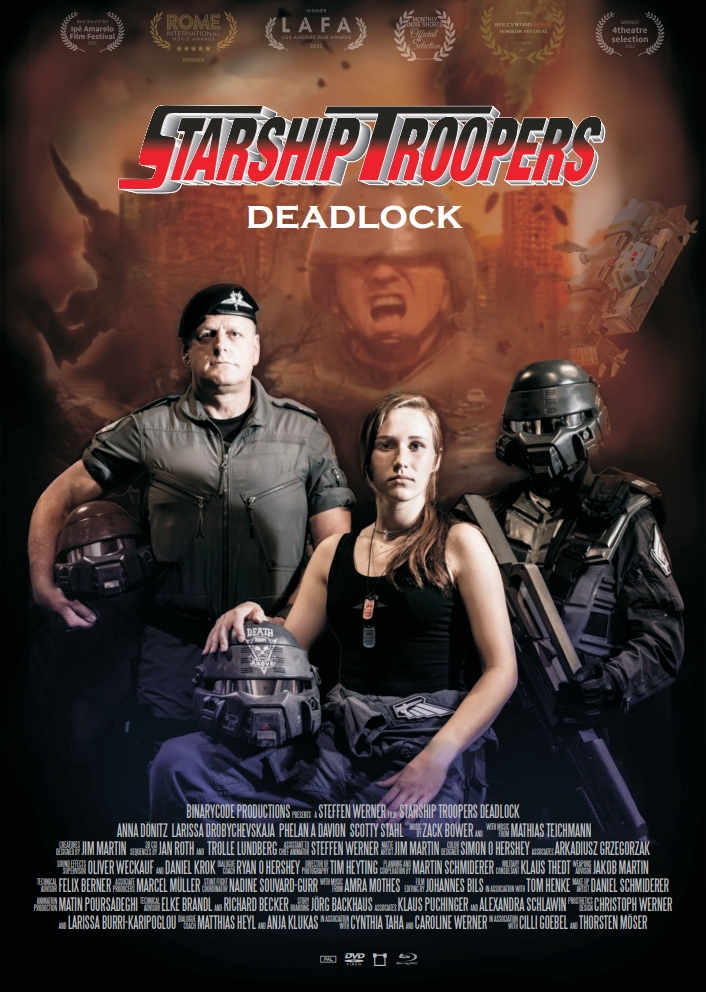
A poster for a 2022 fan-made film based on Robert Heinlein's Starship Troopers. Both the novel and film of the same name and sequel films like this one depict space marines who fight in planets across the galaxy.

Eventually, as science fiction became an established and separate genre, military science fiction established itself as a subgenre. One such work is H. Beam Piper's Uller Uprising (1952) (based on the events of the Sepoy Mutiny). Robert A. Heinlein's Starship Troopers (1959) is another work of military science fiction, along with Gordon Dickson's Dorsai (1960), and these are thought to be mostly responsible for popularizing this subgenre's popularity among young readers of the time.

The Vietnam War led to the "polarization of the SF community", which can be seen in the June 1968 issue of Galaxy Science Fiction, in which pro-war SF authors listed their names on one page and anti-war SF authors listed theirs on another page. The Vietnam War has been noted by the Encyclopedia of Science Fiction as having impacted anthologies such as In the Field of Fire (1987) and novels such as The Healer's War (1988) by Elizabeth Ann Scarborough and Dream Baby (1989) by Bruce McAllister. The Encyclopedia of Science Fiction states that the Vietnam War's influence can be seen indirectly in novels such as Joe Haldeman's The Forever War (published in Analog over 1972–1975) and Lucius Shepard's Life During Wartime (1987). The Vietnam War resulted in veterans with combat experience deciding to write science fiction, including Joe Haldeman and David Drake. Throughout the 1970s, works such as Haldeman's The Forever War and Drake's Hammer's Slammers helped increase the popularity of the genre. Short stories also were popular, collected in books such as Combat SF, edited by Gordon R. Dickson. This anthology includes one of the first Hammer's Slammers stories, as well as one of the BOLO stories by Keith Laumer and one of the Berserker stories by Fred Saberhagen. This anthology seems to have been the first time these stories specifically dealing with war as a subject were collected and marketed as such. The series of anthologies with the group title There Will be War edited by Pournelle and John F. Carr (nine volumes from 1983 through 1990) helped keep the category active, and encouraged new writers to add to it.

David Drake wrote stories about future mercenaries, including the Hammer's Slammers series (1979), which follows the career of a future mercenary tank regiment. Drake's series which "helped initiate a fashion for SF about mercenaries", including The Warrior's Apprentice (1986) by Lois McMaster Bujold.

A twist was introduced in Harry Turtledove's Worldwar series depicting an alternate history in which WWII is disrupted by extraterrestrials invading Earth in 1942, forcing humans to stop fighting each other and unite against this common enemy. Turtledove depicts the tactics and strategy of this new course of the war in detail, showing how American, British, Soviet and German soldiers and Jewish guerrillas (some of them historical figures) deal with this extraordinary new situation, as well as providing a not unsympathetic detailed point of view of individual invader warriors. In the war situation posited by Turtledove, the invaders have superior arms, but the gap is not too wide for the humans to bridge. For example, the invaders have more advanced tanks, but the German Wehrmacht's tank crews facing them – a major theme in the series – are more skilled and far more experienced.

The Encyclopedia of Science Fiction lists three notable women authors of MSF: Lois McMaster Bujold; Elizabeth Moon (particularly her Familias Regnant stories such as Hunting Party (1993)), and Karen Traviss.

== Political themes ==
Several authors have presented stories with political messages of varying types as major or minor themes of their works.

David Drake has often written of the horrors and futility of war. He has said, in the afterwords of several of his Hammer's Slammers books (1979 and later), that one of his reasons for writing is to educate those people who have not experienced war, but who might have to make the decision to start or endorse a war (as policymakers or as voters) about what war is really like, and what the powers and limits of the military as an instrument of policy are.

David Weber has said:

For me, military science fiction is science fiction which is written about a military situation with a fundamental understanding of how military lifestyles and characters differ from civilian lifestyles and characters. It is science fiction which attempts to realistically portray the military within a science-fiction context. It is not 'bug shoots'. It is about human beings, and members of other species, caught up in warfare and carnage. It isn't an excuse for simplistic solutions to problems.

== Practical applications by military ==
In 1980 and 1981, two science fiction authors inspired President Ronald Reagan's vision for a Strategic Defense Initiative in which satellites would be set up to shoot at nuclear missiles. The two authors were Larry Niven, the author of the Ringworld series, and Jerry Pournelle. Along with like-minded colleagues, they formed a committee to lobby the United States on space issues and influence Reagan's space policies. Pournelle advocated a "robust, technocratic military state". In addition to Pournelle's science fiction writing, he wrote a "paper for the Air Force on stability's role in national security".

President Reagan read the space advice that Niven, Pournelle, and their colleagues prepared, which influenced Reagan's 1983 Strategic Defense Initiative. "Niven and Pournelle saw an opportunity to shape the great void in their political image, and Reagan viewed space as yet another tool to defend America against the communist superpower...". Science fiction authors such as Arthur C. Clarke and Isaac Asimov criticized the Strategic Defense Initiative.

After the 9/11 terrorism attacks, a group of sci-fi authors called Sigma, including Pournelle and Niven, advised the "Department of Homeland Security on technological strategies for defeating terrorist threats."

In 2021, Worldcrunch reported that the French military has hired fiction writers to develop futuristic warfare scenarios, including situations that the military cannot directly study for "ethical reasons, such as Autonomous Lethality Weapon Systems (ALWS), or augmented humans." The French military says the authors are asked to imagine warfare situations that "destabilize us, scare us, blame, or even beat us", in order to provide the army with a "fresh set of practice scenarios". Military planners use the science fiction authors' scenarios to "prepare for previously unthought of situations", "boos[t] creativity" and help the military become "more resourceful."

The German military is also using science fiction to help its military but in its approach, they do not hire science fiction writers to develop scenarios. Instead, they "use existing science fiction" to help the army "predict the "world's next potential conflict."

== See also ==
- List of military science fiction works and authors
- Space warfare in science fiction
- Weapons in science fiction
- War novel
