= Raygun =

Fictional weapon

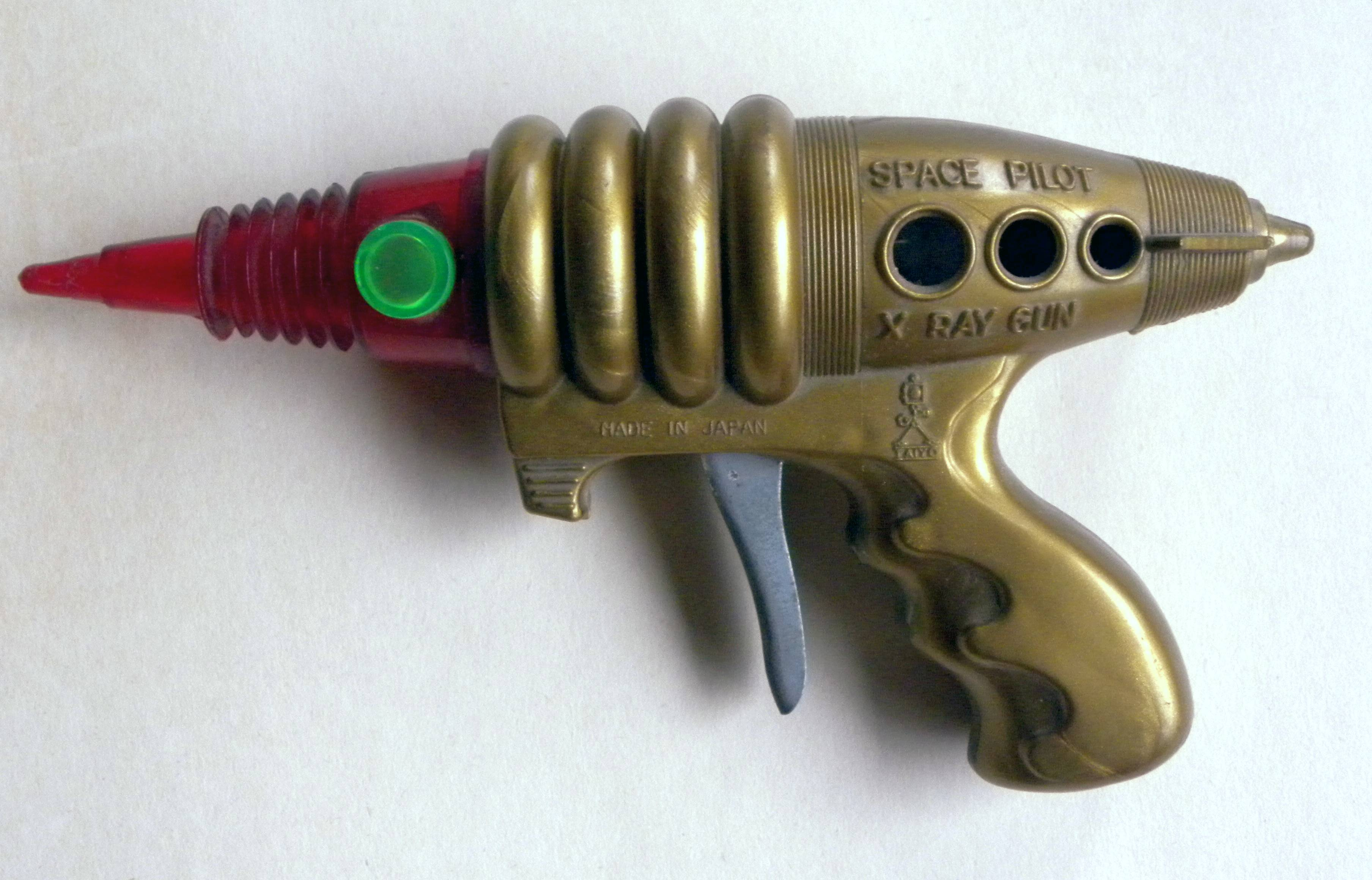
Toy "Space Pilot X Ray Gun" made by the Japanese Taiyo company in the early 1970s. When the trigger is pulled, the mechanism in the toy makes sounds and causes sparks to appear inside the transparent red cone on the front.

A raygun is a science-fiction directed-energy weapon usually with destructive effect. They have various names: ray gun, death ray, beam gun, blaster, laser gun, laser pistol, phaser, zap gun, etc. In most stories a raygun emits a ray usually lethal if it hits a human target, often destructive if it hits mechanical objects, with various other properties and effects.

Real-world analogues are directed-energy weapons or electrolasers: electroshock weapons which send current along an electrically conductive laser-induced plasma channel.

== History ==
A very early example of a raygun is the Heat-Ray featured in H. G. Wells' novel The War of the Worlds (1898). Science fiction during the 1920s described death rays. Early science fiction often described or depicted raygun beams making bright light and loud noise like lightning or large electric arcs.

According to The Encyclopedia of Science Fiction, the word "ray gun" was first used by Victor Rousseau Emanuel in 1917, in a passage from The Messiah of the Cylinder:

All is not going well, Arnold: the ray-rods are emptying fast, and our attack upon the lower level of the wing has failed. Sanson has placed a ray-gun there. All depends on the air-scouts, and we must hold our positions until the battle-planes arrive.

The variant "ray projector" was used by John W. Campbell in The Black Star Passes in 1930. Related terms "disintegrator ray" dates to 1898 in Garrett P. Serviss' Edison's Conquest of Mars; "blaster" dates to 1925 in Nictzin Dyalhis' story "When the Green Star Waned"; and "needle ray" and "needler" date to 1934 in E. E. Smith's The Skylark of Valeron.

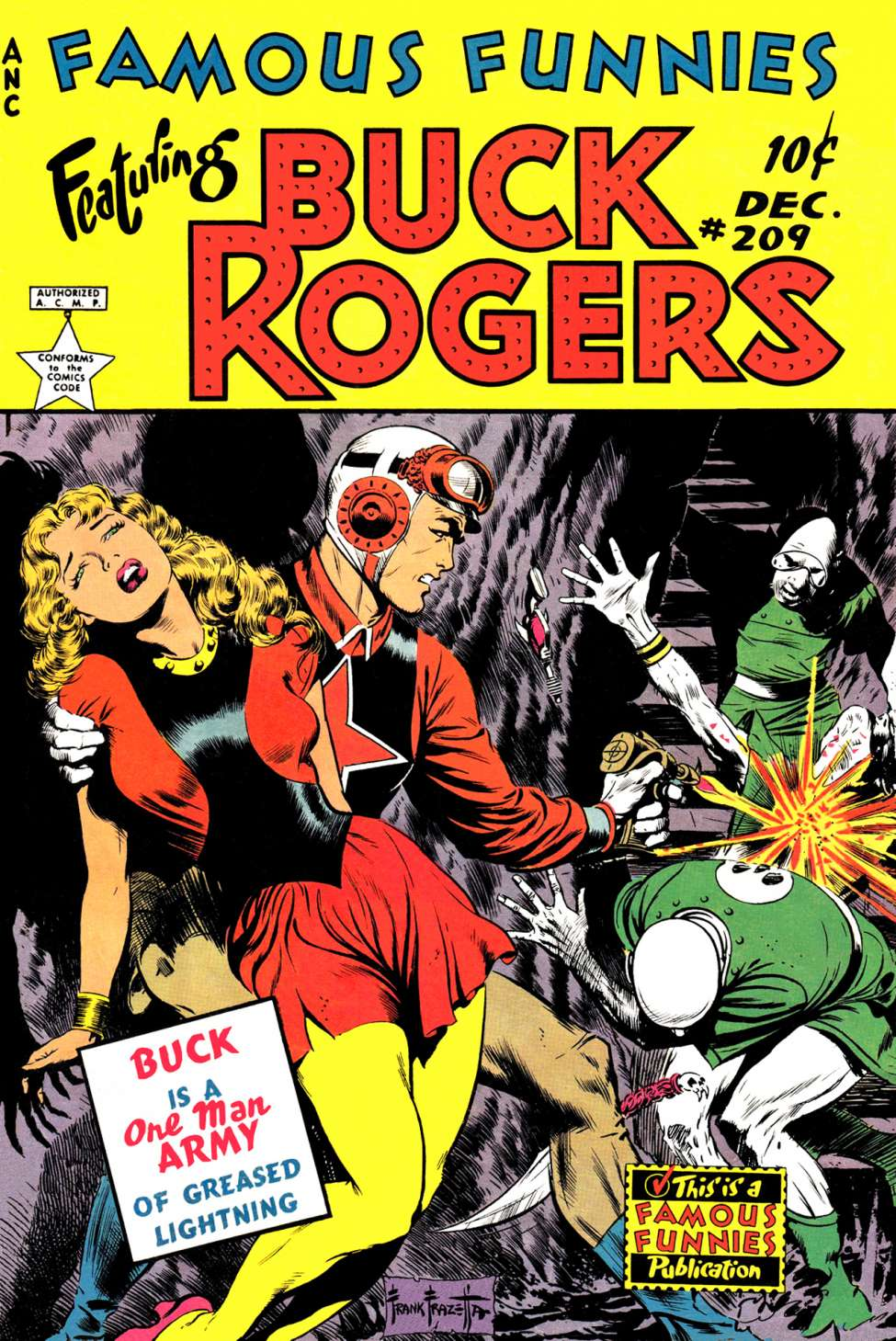
Buck Rogers using a raygun on the cover of Famous Funnies #209

Ray guns were so common on magazine covers during the Golden Age of Science Fiction that Campbell's Astounding was unusual for not depicting them. The term "ray gun" had already become cliché by the 1940s, in part due to association with the comic strips (and later film serials) Buck Rogers and Flash Gordon. Soon after the invention of lasers during 1960, such devices became briefly fashionable as a directed-energy weapon for science fiction stories. For instance, characters of the Lost in Space TV series (1965–1968) and of the Star Trek pilot episode "The Cage" (1964) carried handheld laser weapons.

By the late 1960s and 1970s, as the laser's limits as a weapon became evident, rayguns were dubbed "phasers" (for Star Trek), "blasters" (Star Wars), "pulse rifles", "plasma rifles", and so forth.

== Function ==
Ray guns as described by science fiction do not have the disadvantages that have, so far, made directed-energy weapons largely impractical as weapons in real life, needing a suspension of disbelief by a technologically educated audience:

- Ray guns draw seemingly limitless power from often unspecified sources. In contrast to their real-world counterparts, the batteries or power packs of even handheld weapons are minute, durable, and do not seem to need frequent recharging.
- Ray guns in movies are often shown as shooting discrete pulses of energy visible from off-axis, traveling slowly enough for people to see them emerge, or even for the target to evade them, although real-life laser light is invisible from off-axis and travels at the speed of light. This effect could sometimes be attributed to the beam heating atmosphere that it was passing through. A possible evasion tactic is dodging the firing axis of the gun, theorized in the early story of Mobile Suit Gundam by the character Char Aznable when he first encountered the series protagonist's machine's beam rifle and seemingly dodging it without any difficulty.

Some of the effects are what would be expected from a powerful directed-energy beam if it could be generated in reality:

- Ray guns are often shown as transmitting heat, as with Wells' heat rays.
- Ray guns may be used to cut through hard materials like a blowtorch.

But sometimes not:

- Rays are often depicted as working instantly, with the slightest touch of a beam or bolt sufficing for the intended purpose.
- Raygun victims are generally killed instantly as well; they might be shown with visible wounds or at least impact marks, but this is rare.
  - Some impact effects may be more exotic; the victim may disappear ("de-materialize", disintegrate, vaporize, or evaporate) entirely, personal equipment and all, as sometimes seen with Star Trek's phasers, or may look like a photographic negative during his or her death throes as seen with Doctor Who's Dalek gunsticks (which, from Remembrance of the Daleks onwards, have additionally inflicted an X-ray effect where the victim's skeleton is temporarily visible).
- Some weapons may have recoilling barrels or (if handheld) inflict recoil forces upon the user; in a live-action context, the raygun props might be deliberately built around real firearms (firing blank ammunition) or airsoft guns in order to obtain a recoil effect when "fired". Recoil could only be generated if the momentum of the beam were comparable to that of a bullet shot from a gun.
- A wide range of non-lethal functions as determined by the requirements of the story: for instance, they may stun, paralyze, or knock down a target, much like modern electroshock weapons. Occasionally the rays may have other effects, such as the "freeze rays" in the TV series Batman (1966–1968) and Underdog (1964–1970). Many of the more implausible functions are almost farcical and include rayguns that age or de-age people (various cartoons); shrink rays (Fantastic Voyage, Honey, I Shrunk the Kids), and a "dehydration ray" (Megamind).

Ultimately, typical science fiction rayguns have whatever properties are required for their dramatic purpose. They bear little resemblance to real-world directed-energy weapons, even if they are given the names of existing technologies such as lasers, masers, or particle beams. This can be compared with how, in a typical action movie, real-world firearms tend to infallibly hit their intended target (or at least when wielded by the protagonists anyway) and rarely run out of ammunition.

In addition to having various names depending on the work, rayguns have various sizes and forms: types comparable to pistols, two-handed types (often called a rifle), or types comparable to heavy machine guns or cannons (these latter types usually being mounted on weapons platforms, vehicles, spaceships, or space stations; sufficiently large examples might even be installed into an astronomical body as seen with Starkiller Base in Star Wars: The Force Awakens). Most handheld rayguns have a conventional grip and trigger, but some (e.g. various phaser models) do not. The raygun might also be worn (e.g. on the wrist) or integrated into personal armor instead of being handheld. When raygun props are prepared for live-action productions, said props may be made from scratch or built from real firearms or replicas thereof (with these items then receiving various cosmetic additions and alterations to disguise their real-world origins). Sometimes the end of the barrel expands into a shield, as if to protect the user from back-flash from the emitted beam.

== Feasibility ==
Michio Kaku dedicated the third chapter of his 2008 book Physics of the Impossible to the problem of ray guns and similar directed-energy weapons. He concluded that handheld weapons of the kind featured in a typical science fiction setting were not scientifically viable at the time of the book's publication but could become viable within the space of a century or two assuming that certain advances in material science (for lasing material purposes) and nanotechnology (for the purposes of having a sufficiently compact power source) were made. Attempts to create a basic ray gun-type weapon today, Kaku claimed, would require either a portable power pack on the order of a "minature hydrogen bomb, which might destroy you as well as the target", or a cabled connection to a stationary power source, while any currently available lasing material would be insufficiently stable for handheld use. Extremely powerful rayguns such as the Death Star's superlaser in the Star Wars franchise, meanwhile, could theoretically function either as a nuclear-fired X-ray laser or as a gamma ray burster, but said Death Star-type ordnance would require thousands or even millions of years to be realistically developed.

Ethan Siegel, when assessing Star Trek's "plasma rifle" and "phaser" ray guns in his 2017 book Treknology, drew parallels to directed-energy weapons that were in United States use as of 2017 and to electroshock weapons (including electrolasers) respectively, and said that the greatest current obstacle to making phasers (and other ray guns) a reality was ensuring that an eventual weapon could conduct its energy without being dependent on an atmospheric medium or on physical contact with the intended target.

== Types ==
The "rays" the guns use vary. They are sometimes equated to real life technologies such as:

- lasers
- particle beams, e.g. protons and/or neutrons from the proton packs in Ghostbusters
- plasma, e.g. plasma rifles, Star Wars "Blasters"

Alternately, the weapon mechanics can be purely fictional. Fictional ray types include:

- "Minovsky particles" in the Gundam anime series
- "Rapid Nadion particles" utilized by the phasers in Star Trek

== List of rayguns ==
The following is a list of notable rayguns.

=== Literature ===
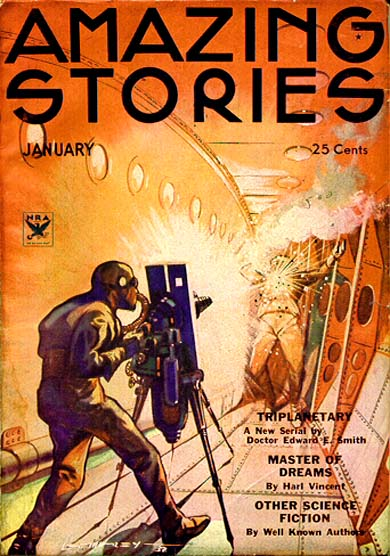
Raygun in E. E. Smith's Lensman novels

- Heat-Ray, weapons used by the Martians in the novel The War of the Worlds by H. G. Wells
- The Garin Death Ray, title weapon in The Hyperboloid of Engineer Garin (1927): "hyperboloid", a highly concentrated collimated light beam weapon
- Lasgun, a laser projector from the Dune series of books

=== Film and television ===
- Proton pack, an energy weapon used for weakening ghosts and aiding in capturing them in the film Ghostbusters
- Phasers, disruptors, and plasma rifles and cannons are a few of the many weapons of Star Trek.
- Blasters, standard weapons of the Star Wars universe.

=== Games ===
- BFG, a large gun in the Doom and Quake series of games

== See also ==
- Weapons in science fiction
