= Interstellar war =

Hypothetical war between combatants from different planetary systems

An interstellar war is a hypothetical space war between combatants from different planetary systems. The concept provides a common plot device in science fiction, especially in the space opera subgenre. In contrast, the term intergalactic war refers to war between combatants from different galaxies, and interplanetary war refers to war between combatants from different planets of the same planetary system.

== Likelihood ==
Michael H. Hart argued that if humans ever spread to other planetary systems, the actual likelihood of interstellar war would be low due to the immense distances (and hence travel times involved)—interstellar war would require a vastly greater investment of time and resources than present-day intraplanetary wars involve. By contrast, Robert Freitas argued that the energy expenditure required for interstellar war would be trivial from the viewpoint of a Type II or Type III civilisation on the Kardashev scale.

== Interstellar war in fiction ==
The earliest fictional references appear to deal with interplanetary, not interstellar war (e.g. H. G. Wells' 1898 novel The War of the Worlds). Writers such as Larry Niven have developed plausible interplanetary conflict based on human colonization of the asteroid belt and outer planets by means of technologies utilising the laws of physics as currently understood. However, now that the other planets of the Solar System are believed to be devoid of intelligent life, sci-fi writers generally posit some form of faster-than-light drive in order to facilitate interstellar war.

In the 1980s, Ace Books published a 3-volume science fiction anthology called The Future at War, edited by Reginald Bretnor. The first volume, Thor's Hammer, contained stories about wars on Earth and in near-Earth space. The second volume, The Spear of Mars, had stories depicting interplanetary war. And the third volume, Orion's Sword, treated interstellar war.

== See also ==
- Militarisation of space
- Space warfare
