= Hurn shadow ministry =

Shadow ministry of South Australian opposition leader Ashton Hurn

- Shadow cabinet of South Australia

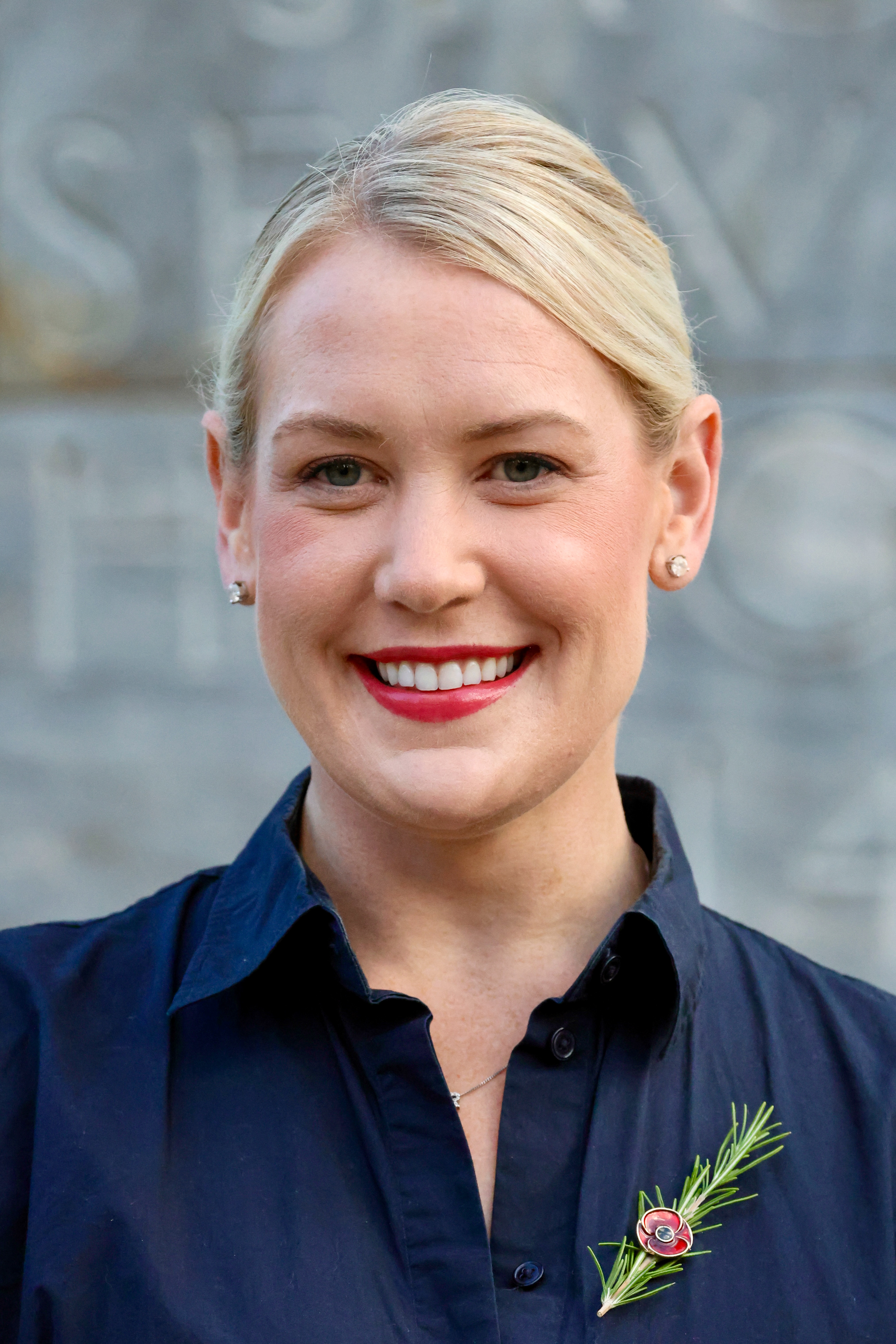
- Hurn in 2025
- Date formed: 12 December 2025

People and organisations
- Opposition Leader: Ashton Hurn
- Deputy Opposition Leader: Josh Teague
- No. of ministers: 11
- Ministers removed: 5
- Total no. of members: 16
- Member parties: Liberal
- Status in legislature: Opposition

History
- Legislature terms: 55th and 56th
- Predecessor: Tarzia shadow ministry

The shadow ministry of Ashton Hurn is the shadow ministry in South Australia in opposition to the Peter Malinauskas government. The shadow ministry is the Opposition's alternative to the first and second Malinauskas ministries.

The shadow ministry was appointed by South Australian Liberal Party leader Ashton Hurn on 12 December 2025, following a party leadership spill on 8 December where Hurn was elected unopposed following the resignation of incumbent leader Vincent Tarzia. The current arrangement of the shadow ministry was announced on 2 April following the 2026 South Australian state election.

The shadow ministry succeeded the Tarzia shadow ministry as the Liberal Party shadow cabinet.

== First arrangement (12 December 2025 – 2 April 2026) ==
Due to some very poor internal polling results, Vincent Tarzia stood down as party leader three months out from the 2026 election. Ashton Hurn was elected unopposed as the new leader and announced her shadow cabinet on 12 December 2025. The only member not to be included from Tarzia's ministry was the retiring Matt Cowdrey dropping the shadow ministry size down to 16 from 17. Cowdrey's portfolio of Sport was assigned to Tarzia who also picked up Recreation and Racing from Tim Whetstone.

Josh Teague who was unanimously re-elected at deputy leader, kept his existing portfolios of Shadow Attorney-General, Shadow Minister for Aboriginal Affairs and Shadow Minister for Child Protection. Leader of the Opposition in the Legislative Council Nicola Centofanti maintained her portfolios Primary Industries, Regional Development and Water, albeit with slight name changes. Heidi Girolamo became the Shadow Minister for Health and Wellbeing which was Hurn's previous role. Ben Hood, who replaced Stephen Wade in upper house in March 2023 following his retirement was promoted to Shadow Treasurer. In addition, he picked up Small and Family Business from Tarzia and kept his existing role of Shadow Minister for Industrial Relations and Public Sector.

Jack Batty maintained responsibility for Police and Correctional Services and the Arts, picked up Education from Girolamo and stayed on as Manager of Opposition Business in the House. There was no change in Michelle Lensink's responsiblities of Planning, Housing, Human Services, Women and the Prevention of Domestic, Family and Sexual Violence. Stephen Patterson kept his Defence and Space Industries role and his separate Energy and Mining portfolios were merged. Tim Whetstone remained as Shadow Minister for Trade, Industry and Investment and Shadow Minister for Emergency Services.

Sam Telfer lost the Treasury portfolio to Ben Hood and picked up the Infrastructure and Transport also from Hood whilst also keeping responsibilities for Local Government. Both Adrian Pederick and Penny Pratt kept their existing portfolios of Veterans Affairs and Regional Roads, and Regional Health Services and Tourism, respectively. David Basham kept Environment and added Climate with Water moving to Centofanti. Dennis Hood picked up Training and Skills from Cowdrey and Multicultural Affairs previously held by Teague. Laura Henderson picked up the Shadow Cabinet Secretary position from Dennis Hood and kept her all her shadow assistant minister roles with the exception of Government Accountability which was dropped. She also remained the Opposition Whip in the Legislative Council.

Hurn stated that this was a streamlined ministry with previous separate portfolios dropped and merged into other roles. These included Girolamo's previous roles Cost of Living, Finance and Tax Reform; Telfer's Government Accountability and Hospitality positions; Batty's Road Safety and Future Economy; Patterson's Nuclear Readiness; Whetstone's Social Services; Pratt's Ageing and Mental Health and Suicide Prevention; Pederick's Marine Infrastructure and Cowdrey's Workforce and Population Growth.

This arrangement remained unchanged during the lead up to the election.

=== Shadow cabinet ===
First arrangement of the Hurn shadow cabinet
Party	Shadow Minister	Portrait	Offices	Electorate	Ref
Liberal	Ashton Hurn (born 1991)	Ashton Hurn	Leader of the Opposition; Leader of the South Australia Liberal Party	Schubert (2022–)	
Liberal	Josh Teague (born 1975)		Deputy Leader of the Opposition; Deputy Leader of the South Australia Liberal Party; Shadow Attorney-General; Shadow Minister for Aboriginal Affairs; Shadow Minister for Child Protection	Heysen (2018–)	
Liberal	Hon Nicola Centofanti (born 1982)	Nicola Centofanti	Leader of the Opposition in the Legislative Council; Leader of the South Australia Liberal Party in the Legislative Council; Shadow Minister for Primary Industries and Regional Development; Shadow Minister for Water	Legislative Council (2020–)	
Liberal	Hon Heidi Girolamo (born 1983)		Deputy Leader of the Opposition in the Legislative Council; Deputy Leader of the South Australia Liberal Party in the Legislative Council; Shadow Minister for Health and Wellbeing	Legislative Council (2021–)	
Liberal	Hon Ben Hood (born 1980)	Ben Hood	Shadow Treasurer; Shadow Minister for Small and Family Business; Shadow Minister for Industrial Relations and Public Sector	Legislative Council (2023–)	
Liberal	Jack Batty (born 1990)		Shadow Minister for Education; Shadow Minister for Police and Correctional Services; Shadow Minister for Arts; Manager of Opposition Business in the House of Assembly	Bragg (2022–)	
Liberal	Hon Vincent Tarzia (born 1986)	Vincent Tarzia	Shadow Minister for Sport, Recreation and Racing	Hartley (2014–2026)	
Liberal	Hon Michelle Lensink (born 1970)	Michelle Lensink	Shadow Minister for Planning; Shadow Minister for Housing; Shadow Minister for Human Services; Shadow Minister for Women; Shadow Minister for the Prevention of Domestic, Family and Sexual Violence	Legislative Council (2003–)	
Liberal	Stephen Patterson (born 1971)	Stephen Patterson	Shadow Minister for Energy and Mining; Shadow Minister for Defence and Space Industries	Morphett (2018–2026)	
Liberal	Tim Whetstone (born 1960)	Tim Whetstone	Shadow Minister for Trade, Industry and Investment; Shadow Minister for Emergency Services	Chaffey (2010–)	
Liberal	Sam Telfer (born 1985)		Shadow Minister for Infrastructure and Transport; Shadow Minister for Local Government	Flinders (2022–)	
Liberal	Adrian Pederick (born 1962)	Adrian Pederick	Shadow Minister for Veterans Affairs; Shadow Minister for Regional Roads	Hammond (2006–2026)	
Liberal	Penny Pratt (born 1975)		Shadow Minister for Regional Health Services; Shadow Minister for Tourism	Frome (2022–2026)	
Liberal	David Basham (born 1968)		Shadow Minister for Climate and Environment	Finniss (2018–2026)	
Liberal	Hon Dennis Hood (born 1970)	Dennis Hood	Shadow Minister for Training and Skills; Shadow Minister for Multicultural Affairs	Legislative Council (2006–) (Note: Hood was a member of the Family First Party between 2006 and 2017 and member of the Australian Conservatives between 2017 and 2018, before switching to the Liberal Party.)	

=== Shadow assistant ministry ===
First arrangement of the Hurn shadow assistant ministry
Party	Shadow Minister	Portrait	Offices	Electorate	Ref
Liberal	Hon Laura Henderson (born 1996 or 1997)		Shadow Assistant Minister to the Leader of the Opposition; Shadow Assistant Minister to the Shadow Attorney-General; Shadow Assistant Minister for Child Protection; Shadow Assistant Minister for Youth; Shadow Assistant Minister for Multicultural Affairs; Shadow Cabinet Secretary; Opposition Whip in the Legislative Council	Legislative Council (2022–)	

== Second arrangement (from 2 April 2026) ==
The 2026 election was the worst result in the history of the South Australian Liberal Party, finishing third in the statewide primary vote behind the Labor Party and One Nation. However, by securing five seats in the House of Assembly ahead of One Nation's four, the Liberal Party narrowly managed to maintain their status of the official opposition. Following the election, Ashton Hurn announced the second arrangement of her shadow ministry on 2 April with all eleven members of the Liberal parliamentary party being assigned shadow portfolios.

Hurn, in addition to her role as Leader of the Opposition took on the Shadow Minister for Defence and Space Industries from Stephen Patterson who lost his seat of Morphett and the Shadow Minister for Trade, Industry and Investment from Tim Whetstone. Deputy Leader Josh Teague, who managed to narrowly hold on to his seat of Heysen, stayed on as Shadow Attorney-General and Shadow Minister for Aboriginal Affairs and picked up Housing and Planning from Michelle Lensink. Nicola Centofanti, Legislative Council Opposition Leader remained the Shadow Minister for Primary Industries and Regional Development and added Environment to her Water portfolio. She picked this up from David Basham who lost his seat of Finniss who previously held the Climate and Environment portfolio. The Deputy Leader of the Opposition in the Legislative Council, Heidi Girolamo was re-elected to the upper house and became the Shadow Minister for Education, Training and Skills and Shadow Minister for Arts.

Upper House MP Ben Hood who was also re-elected picked up Energy and Mining from Patterson on top of his existing roles of Shadow Treasurer, Shadow Minister for Small and Family Business and Shadow Minister for Industrial Relations and Public Sector. The member for Bragg, Jack Batty who gained a tiny increase in his majority stayed on as Manager of Opposition Business in the House, picked up Health and Wellbeing from Girolamo and lost Education and the Arts to Girolamo. The longest serving Liberal member Michelle Lensink MLC stayed on as Shadow Minister for Human Services and Shadow Minister for Women and picked up Multicultural Affairs from Dennis Hood and the new role of Shadow Minister for Seniors and Aging. Chaffey MP Tim Whetstone kept his role of Shadow Minister for Emergency Services added Shadow Minister for Police and Shadow Minister for Correctional Services previously held by Batty. Sam Telfer, who was re-elected as the member for Flinders with a increased majority, kept his existing roles of Shadow Minister for Infrastructure and Transport and Shadow Minister for Local Government. He also picked up responsibly for Regional Roads from defeated Hammond MP Adrian Pederick and the role of Shadow Minister for Road Safety which was last held by Batty in the Tarzia shadow ministry.

Family First turned Australian Conservatives turned Liberal Upper House MP Dennis Hood lost the Shadow Minister for Training and Skills to Girolamo and Shadow Minister for Multicultural Affairs to Lensink. In this arrangement, he was assigned the shadow roles of Veteran Affairs, previous held by Pederick; Tourism, previously held by the Frome MP Penny Pratt who was defeated standing for the seat of Ngadjuri; and Recreation, Sport and Racing, previously held by Vincent Tarzia, the former Liberal leader who lost his seat of Hartley. Finally, Laura Henderson was promoted to the shadow cabinet and picked up Shadow Minister for Child Protection from Teague and Shadow Minister for the Prevention of Domestic, Family and Sexual Violence from Lensink. Pratt's other former role of Shadow Minister for Regional Health Services was not reassigned.

=== Shadow cabinet ===
Second arrangement of the Hurn shadow ministry
Party	Shadow Minister	Portrait	Offices	Electorate	Ref
Liberal	Ashton Hurn (born 1991)	Ashton Hurn	Leader of the Opposition; Leader of the South Australia Liberal Party; Shadow Minister for Defence and Space Industries; Shadow Minister for Trade, Industry and Investment	Schubert (2022–)	
Liberal	Josh Teague (born 1975)		Deputy Leader of the Opposition; Deputy Leader of the South Australia Liberal Party; Shadow Attorney-General; Shadow Minister for Housing; Shadow Minister for Planning; Shadow Minister for Aboriginal Affairs	Heysen (2018–)	
Liberal	Hon Nicola Centofanti (born 1982)	Nicola Centofanti	Leader of the Opposition in the Legislative Council; Leader of the South Australia Liberal Party in the Legislative Council; Shadow Minister for Primary Industries and Regional Development; Shadow Minister for Environment and Water	Legislative Council (2020–)	
Liberal	Hon Heidi Girolamo (born 1983)		Deputy Leader of the Opposition in the Legislative Council; Deputy Leader of the South Australia Liberal Party in the Legislative Council; Shadow Minister for Education, Training and Skills; Shadow Minister for Arts	Legislative Council (2021–)	
Liberal	Hon Ben Hood (born 1980)	Ben Hood	Shadow Treasurer; Shadow Minister for Small and Family Business; Shadow Minister for Energy and Mining; Shadow Minister for Industrial Relations and Public Sector	Legislative Council (2023–)	
Liberal	Jack Batty (born 1990)		Shadow Minister for Health and Wellbeing; Manager of Opposition Business in the House of Assembly	Bragg (2022–)	
Liberal	Hon Michelle Lensink (born 1970)	Michelle Lensink	Shadow Minister for Human Services; Shadow Minister for Women; Shadow Minister for Seniors and Aging; Shadow Minister for Multicultural Affairs	Legislative Council (2003–)	
Liberal	Tim Whetstone (born 1960)	Tim Whetstone	Shadow Minister for Police; Shadow Minister for Correctional Services; Shadow Minister for Emergency Services	Chaffey (2010–)	
Liberal	Sam Telfer (born 1985)		Shadow Minister for Infrastructure and Transport; Shadow Minister for Local Government; Shadow Minister for Regional Roads; Shadow Minister for Road Safety	Flinders (2022–)	
Liberal	Hon Dennis Hood (born 1970)	Dennis Hood	Shadow Minister for Veteran Affairs; Shadow Minister for Tourism; Shadow Minister for Recreation, Sport and Racing	Legislative Council (2006–)	
Liberal	Hon Laura Henderson (born 1996 or 1997)		Shadow Minister for Child Protection; Shadow Minister for the Prevention of Domestic, Family and Sexual Violence	Legislative Council (2022–)	
