= Speirs shadow ministry =

The shadow ministry of David Speirs was the Liberal Party opposition between April 2022 and August 2024, opposing the Malinauskas government of the Labor Party in the Parliament of South Australia. It was led by David Speirs following his election as party leader and leader of the opposition on 19 April 2022, and lasted until Speirs resigned as party leader and opposition leader on 8 August 2024. The deputy leader of the shadow ministry was John Gardner.

The shadow ministry succeeded the Marshall ministry as the Liberal Party frontbench and the Malinauskas shadow ministry as the South Australian shadow cabinet. It was succeeded by the Tarzia shadow ministry.

== Shadow cabinet ==
The current Speirs shadow ministry was announced on 21 April 2022. The shadow ministry is made up of 15 members of the Liberal Party. Ministers from the previous Marshall ministry David Basham, David Pisoni and Stephen Wade opted to remain as backbenchers. Former deputy premier Vickie Chapman also opted not to return to frontbench after announcing her retirement from politics earlier in the week. There were a number of new additions to the Liberal Party frontbench, including Ashton Hurn and Penny Pratt who were newly elected at the election and immediately elevated to the frontbench.

Officeholder	Office(s)	Image
David Speirs MP	Leader of the Opposition; Shadow Minister for Environment; Shadow Minister for Small and Family Business; Shadow Minister for Disability	
John Gardner MP	Deputy Leader of the Opposition; Shadow Minister for Education, Training and Skills; Shadow Minister for the Arts and Festivals	
Nicola Centofanti MLC	Shadow Minister for Regional South Australia; Shadow Minister for Primary Industries; Shadow Minister for Water Resources and the River Murray; Leader of the Opposition in the Legislative Council	
Jing Lee MLC	Shadow Minister for Multicultural South Australia; Shadow Minister for Communities; Shadow Minister for Tourism and Hospitality; Deputy Leader of the Opposition in the Legislative Council	
Michelle Lensink MLC	Shadow Minister for Planning; Shadow Minister for Social and Community Housing; Shadow Minister for Housing Affordability and Urban Development; Shadow Minister for Women	
Ashton Hurn MP	Shadow Minister for Health	
Vincent Tarzia MP	Shadow Minister for Infrastructure and Transport; Shadow Minister for Sport, Recreation and Racing	
Josh Teague MP	Shadow Attorney-General; Shadow Minister for Aboriginal Affairs; Shadow Minister for Child Protection; Shadow Minister for the Prevention of Family and Domestic Violence	
Stephen Patterson MP	Shadow Minister for Energy and Net Zero; Shadow Minister for Mining; Shadow Minister for Defence and Space Industries	
Matt Cowdrey MP	Shadow Treasurer	
Penny Pratt MP	Shadow Minister for Regional Health Services; Shadow Minister for Ageing; Shadow Minister for Preventative Health and Wellbeing	
Heidi Girolamo MLC	Shadow Minister for Finance; Shadow Minister for Trade and Investment; Shadow Minister for the Circular Economy	
Tim Whetstone MP	Shadow Minister for Police and Community Safety; Shadow Minister for Road Safety; Shadow Minister for Corrections; Shadow Minister for Mental Health and Suicide Prevention	
Adrian Pederick MP	Shadow Minister for Veterans Affairs; Shadow Minister for Emergency Services; Shadow Minister for Regional Roads	
Sam Telfer MP	Shadow Minister for Local Government; Shadow Minister for Regional Population Growth; Shadow Minister for Regional Planning	

=== Shadow Parliamentary Secretaries ===
- Nick McBride MP, Shadow Parliamentary Secretary for Regional Engagement
- Laura Curran MLC, Shadow Parliamentary Secretary to the Shadow Attorney-General Responsible for Child Protection and the Prevention of Family and Domestic Violence
- Dennis Hood MLC, Shadow Cabinet Secretary

== See also ==
- 2022 South Australian state election
- Malinauskas ministry
