= 2030 South Australian state election =

Election of South Australia's 57th parliament

- 16 March 2030

All 47 seats in the House of Assembly 24 seats needed for a majority 11 of 22 seats in the Legislative Council
- Opinion polls
- Registered: 1,322,042; As of 30 April 2026
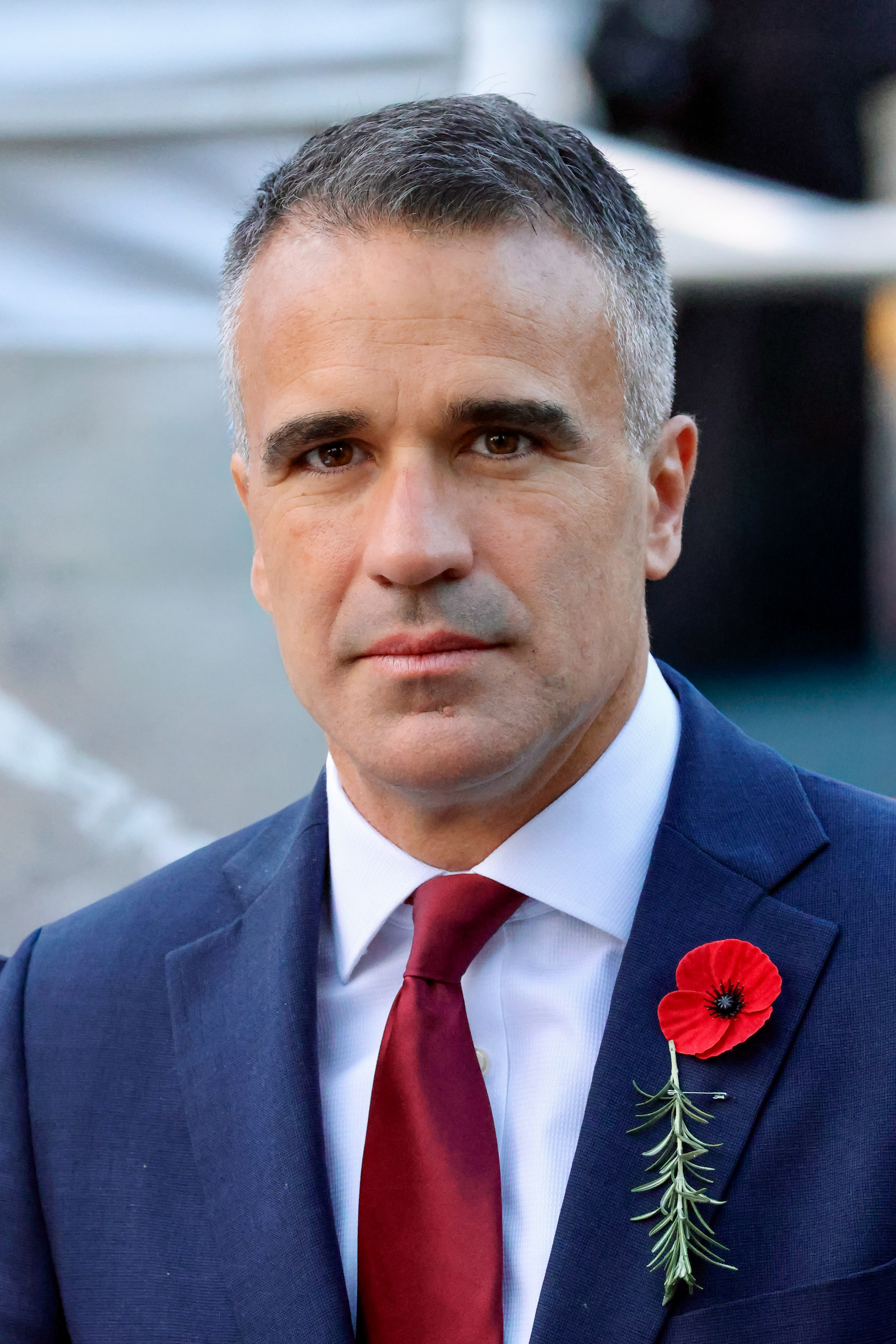

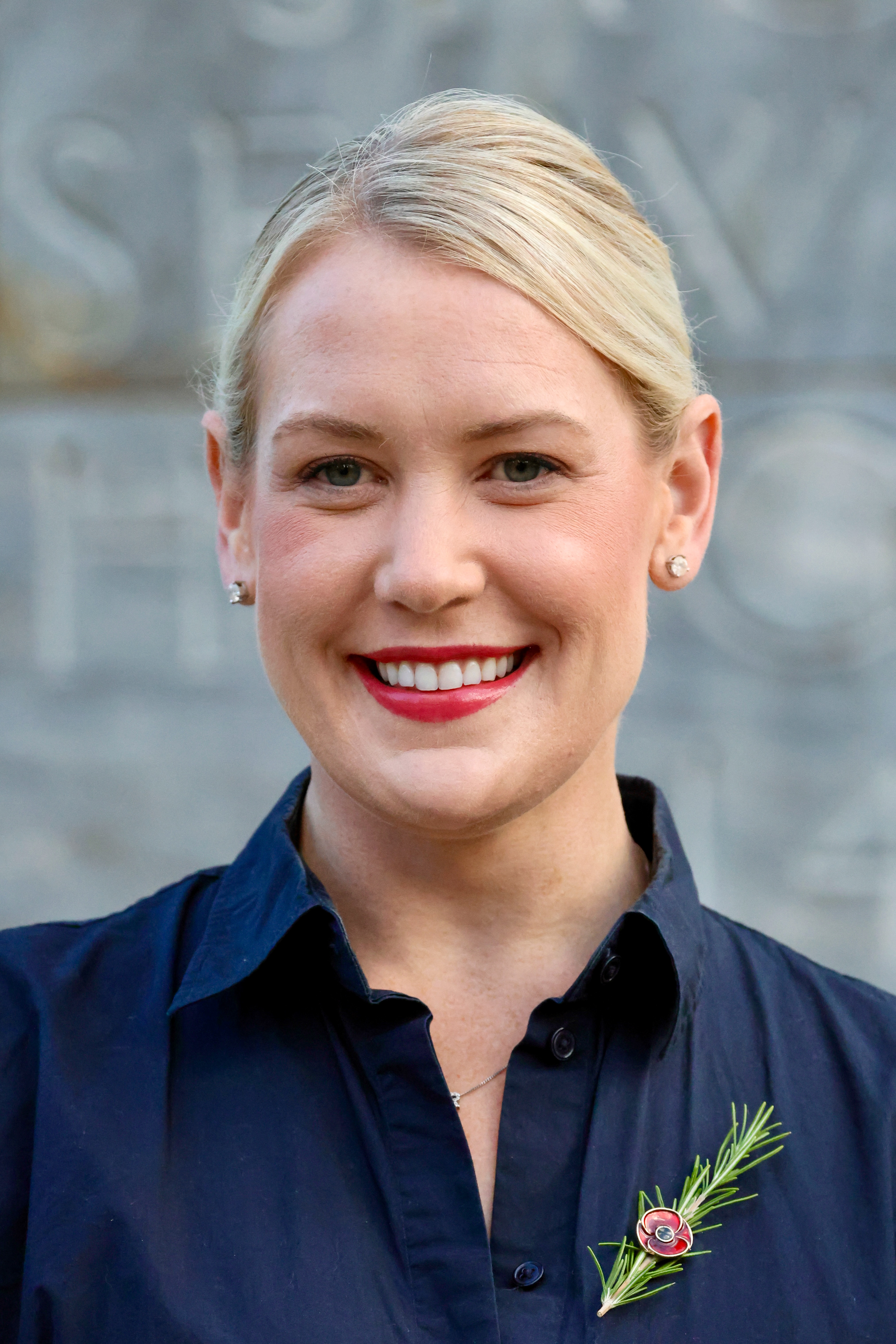

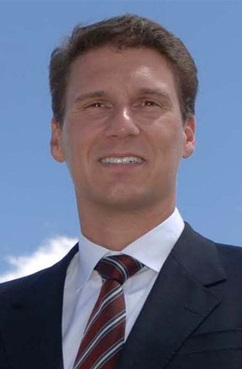
Leader	Peter Malinauskas	Ashton Hurn	Cory Bernardi
Party	Labor	Liberal	One Nation
Leader since	9 April 2018	8 December 2025	3 February 2026
Leader's seat	Croydon	Schubert	Legislative Council
Last election	34 seats	5 seats	4 seats
Current seats	33 (Note: * In May 2026, Labor MHA Nat Cook was elected Speaker and duly moved to sit as an independent for the parliamentary term.)	5	4
Seats needed	Steady	▲19	▲20
- Current map of House of Assembly electorates as elected in 2026.
Incumbent Premier
Peter Malinauskas
Labor

A state election will be held on 16 March 2030 to elect the members of the 57th Parliament of South Australia. All 47 seats in the House of Assembly (lower house) will be up for election, along with 11 of the 22 seats in the Legislative Council (upper house).

The incumbent Labor government, led by Premier Peter Malinauskas, is expected to seek a third four-year term in government. It is expected that they will be challenged by the Liberal Party, led by Opposition Leader Ashton Hurn, and One Nation, led by Cory Bernardi. It is expected that the Greens and other minor parties and independents will contest the election.

South Australia has compulsory voting, with full-preference instant-runoff voting for single-member electorates in the lower house, and optional preference single transferable voting in the proportionally represented upper house. The election will be conducted by the Electoral Commission of South Australia (ECSA), an independent body answerable to Parliament, and will be held on the same day as the South Australian First Nations Voice election.

== Background ==
=== Previous election ===
At the previous election in March 2026, the Labor Party, led by Peter Malinauskas, was returned to government for a second four-year term, winning 34 seats in the House of Assembly, enough for a ten-seat majority. The Liberal Party, won only five seats and formed the official opposition. The crossbench consisted of four members of One Nation, and four independents: Geoff Brock, Matt Schultz, Travis Fatchen, and Lou Nicholson.

In the Legislative Council, Labor gained a tenth seat, remaining the largest party in the upper house. Following the election, Labor MLC Reggie Martin was elected to the chamber's presidency, meaning that Labor required two additional votes to pass legislation. The Liberals were reduced to six seats, and the Greens remained steady at two. One Nation won three seats, and Connie Bonaros, the last remaining SA Best MP, was defeated.

=== Composition of Parliament ===
In May 2026, at the first sitting of the newly-elected Parliament, Labor MP Nat Cook was elected as Speaker of the House of Assembly and temporarily left the Labor Party, as is required for the role of Speaker. In June 2026, Sarah Game defected from her own party to join Family First on the same night that her Bill proposing new limits on late term abortions was being debated in Parliament.

=== Pre-election standings ===
Parties are listed according to their primary vote share at the previous state election.

Affiliation	House of Assembly			Legislative Council		
Affiliation	2026 election	Current	Change	2026 election	Current	Change
Labor	34	33	▼1	10	10	Steady
One Nation	4	4	Steady	3	3	Steady
Liberal	5	5	Steady	6	6	Steady
Greens	0	0	Steady	2	2	Steady
Independent	4	5	▲1	0	0	Steady
Family First	0	0	Steady	0	1	▲1 (Note: * In June 2026, Fair Go MLC Sarah Game changed affiliation to the Family First Party.)
Fair Go	0	0	Steady	1	0	▼1
Total seats	47			22		

=== House of Assembly pendulum ===
Labor seats (34)
Marginal
Morphett	Toby Priest	ALP	0.7
Light	James Agness	ALP v ONP	1.6
Taylor	Nick Champion	ALP v ONP	4.2
Elizabeth	Ella Shaw	ALP v ONP	4.5
Hartley	Jenn Roberts	ALP	4.7
King	Rhiannon Pearce	ALP v ONP	5.2
Fairly safe
Mawson	Jenni Mitton	ALP v ONP	6.6
Unley	Alice Rolls	ALP	6.8
Dunstan	Cressida O'Hanlon	ALP	8.1
Giles	Eddie Hughes	ALP v ONP	8.5
Morialta	Matthew Marozzi	ALP	8.5
Lee	David Wilkins	ALP v ONP	9.4
Colton	Aria Bolkus	ALP	9.9
Safe
Reynell	Katrine Hildyard	ALP v ONP	10.1
Newland	Olivia Savvas	ALP v ONP	10.3
Hurtle Vale	Nat Cook (IND/Speaker)	ALP v ONP	10.8
Kaurna	Chris Picton	ALP v ONP	12.0
Wright	Blair Boyer	ALP v ONP	12.5
Ramsay	Zoe Bettison	ALP v ONP	12.9
Gibson	Sarah Andrews	ALP	13.7
Port Adelaide	Cheyne Rich	ALP v ONP	14.4
Black	Alex Dighton	ALP v ONP	15.4
Torrens	Meagan Spencer	ALP v ONP	15.6
Florey	Michael Brown	ALP v ONP	16.1
Davenport	Erin Thompson	ALP v ONP	16.4
Cheltenham	Joe Szakacs	ALP v ONP	17.0
Playford	John Fulbrook	ALP v ONP	17.2
Adelaide	Lucy Hood	ALP	18.2
Enfield	Lawrence Ben	ALP v ONP	18.8
Elder	Nadia Clancy	ALP	19.1
Waite	Catherine Hutchesson	ALP	19.7
Very safe
Badcoe	Jayne Stinson	ALP v ONP	21.2
West Torrens	Tom Koutsantonis	ALP v ONP	23.2
Croydon	Peter Malinauskas	ALP v GRN	24.0

Liberal seats (5)
Marginal
Heysen	Josh Teague	LIB	0.6
Fairly safe
Chaffey	Tim Whetstone	LIB v ONP	6.0
Bragg	Jack Batty	LIB	8.5
Flinders	Sam Telfer	LIB v ONP	9.6
Safe
Schubert	Ashton Hurn	LIB	17.4

One Nation seats (4)
Marginal
Narungga	Chantelle Thomas	ONP v LIB	0.1
MacKillop	Jason Virgo	ONP v LIB	0.8
Hammond	Robert Roylance	ONP v ALP	4.9
Fairly safe
Ngadjuri	David Paton	ONP v ALP	7.1

Independent seats (4)
Marginal
Finniss	Lou Nicholson	IND v LIB	5.2
Fairly safe
Stuart	Geoff Brock	IND v ONP	6.9
Safe
Mt Gambier	Travis Fatchen	IND v ONP	10.4
Kavel	Matt Schultz	IND v ALP	10.6

=== Legislative Council ===
Current members of the South Australian Legislative Council
Labor (10)	Liberal (6)	One Nation (3)	Greens (2)	Family First (1)
elected 2026: Emily Bourke; Mira El Dannawi; Justin Hanson; Hilton Gumbys; Clare Scriven	elected 2026: Heidi Girolamo; Ben Hood	elected 2026: Cory Bernardi; Carlos Quaremba; Rebecca Hewett	elected 2026: Melanie Selwood
elected 2022: Ian Hunter; Kyam Maher; Reggie Martin; Tung Ngo; Russell Wortley	elected 2022: Nicola Centofanti; Laura Curran; Dennis Hood; Michelle Lensink		elected 2022: Robert Simms	elected 2022: Sarah Game

== Electoral system ==
Members of the House of Assembly are elected by instant-runoff voting using full preferential voting. Each electoral district elects a single member.

Members of the Legislative Council are elected by proportional representation using a single transferable vote. Members serve staggered eight-year terms with half of the Council elected at each state election.

=== Upcoming redistribution ===
As required under the South Australian Constitution, the South Australian Electoral Districts Boundaries Commission must re-draw the boundaries of the House of Assembly electoral districts after each election.

== Election date ==
The last state election was held on 21 March 2026 to elect members for the House of Assembly and half of the members in the Legislative Council. In South Australia, section 28 of the Constitution Act 1934, as amended in 2001, directs that parliaments have fixed four-year terms, and elections must be held on the third Saturday in March every four years unless this date falls the day after Good Friday, occurs within the same month as a federal election, or the conduct of the election could be adversely affected by a state disaster. Section 28 also states that the Governor may also dissolve the Assembly and call an election for an earlier date if the government has lost the confidence of the Assembly or a bill of special importance has been rejected by the Legislative Council. Section 41 states that both the Council and the Assembly may also be dissolved simultaneously if a deadlock occurs between them.

The Electoral (Miscellaneous) Amendment Act 2013 introduced set dates for writs for general elections in South Australia. The writ sets the dates for the close of the electoral roll and the close of nominations for an election. The Electoral Act 1985 requires that, for a general election, the writ be issued 28 days before the date fixed for polling (S47(2a)) and the electoral roll be closed at 12 noon, six days after the issue of the writ (S48(3(a)(i))). The close of nominations will be at 12 noon three days after the close of rolls (Electoral Act 1985 S48(4)(a) and S4(1)).

Election timeline
Date	Event
16 February 2030	Issue of writs
18 February 2030	Candidate nominations open
22 February 2030	Electoral rolls close Party candidate nominations close
25 February 2030	Independent candidate nominations close Declaration of nominations
9 March 2030	Early voting opens
16 March 2030	Polling day

== Registered parties ==
There are 15 political parties registered with the Electoral Commission of South Australia.

- Animal Justice Party
- Australian Citizens Party
- Australian Family Party
- Australian Labor Party
- Family First Party
- For Unley
- Legalise Cannabis
- Liberal Party
- Libertarian Party
- National Party
- One Nation
- Real Change SA
- SA Socialists
- South Australian Greens
- United Voice Australia Party

== Opinion polling ==
=== Voting intention ===
==== House of Assembly ====
Date	Polling firm	Client	Sample size	Primary vote					2PP vote	
Date	Polling firm	Client	Sample size	ALP	ONP	LIB	GRN	Oth.	ALP	ONP
5–26 Aug 2026	DemosAU	Ace Strategies	1,012	37%	25%	17%	13%	8%	58%	42%
8–13 Jul 2026	RedBridge/Accent	M Resources	862	41%	23%	18%	11%	7%	62.5%	37.5%
29 May – 15 Jun 2026	DemosAU/Premier National	Ace Strategies	931	35%	26%	18%	13%	8%	56%	44%
21 Mar 2026	2026 election result			37.5%	22.9%	18.9%	10.4%	10.3%	55.7% (Note: The Electoral Commission of South Australia abandoned an attempt to calculate a two-party-preferred result as 25 two-candidate-preferred contests were Labor–One Nation and 13 were Labor–Liberal. A number of different sources provided various TPP estimates; the 55.7% figure was provided by Antony Green, between Labor and "Non-Labor". In a contest between Labor and One Nation, Kevin Bonham predicted a TPP of 58.2–41.8, almost identical to DemosAU, who predicted a TPP of 58.1–41.9 in their first poll after the election.)	—

=== Leadership approval ===
Date	Polling firm	Client	Preferred Premier					Malinauskas				Hurn				Bernardi			
Date	Polling firm	Client	Malinauskas	Hurn	Bernardi (Note: By convention, the Premier must be a member of the House of Assembly. Bernardi currently holds office as a member of the Legislative Council.)	Und.	Net	Sat.	Dis.	Und.	Net	Sat.	Dis.	Und.	Net	Sat.	Dis.	Und.	Net
5–26 Aug 2026	DemosAU	Ace Strategies	46%	17%	20%	17%	26%	44%	19%	37%	+25%	22%	24%	54%	–2%	20%	38%	42%	–18%
29 May – 15 Jun 2026	DemosAU/Premier National	Ace Strategies	51%	20%	—N/a	29%	31%	43%	21%	36%	+22%	21%	24%	55%	–3%	20%	41%	39%	–21%
