= 55th Parliament of South Australia =

2022–2026 meeting of the South Australian Parliament

Fifty-fifth Parliament of South Australia
←	54th	56th	→
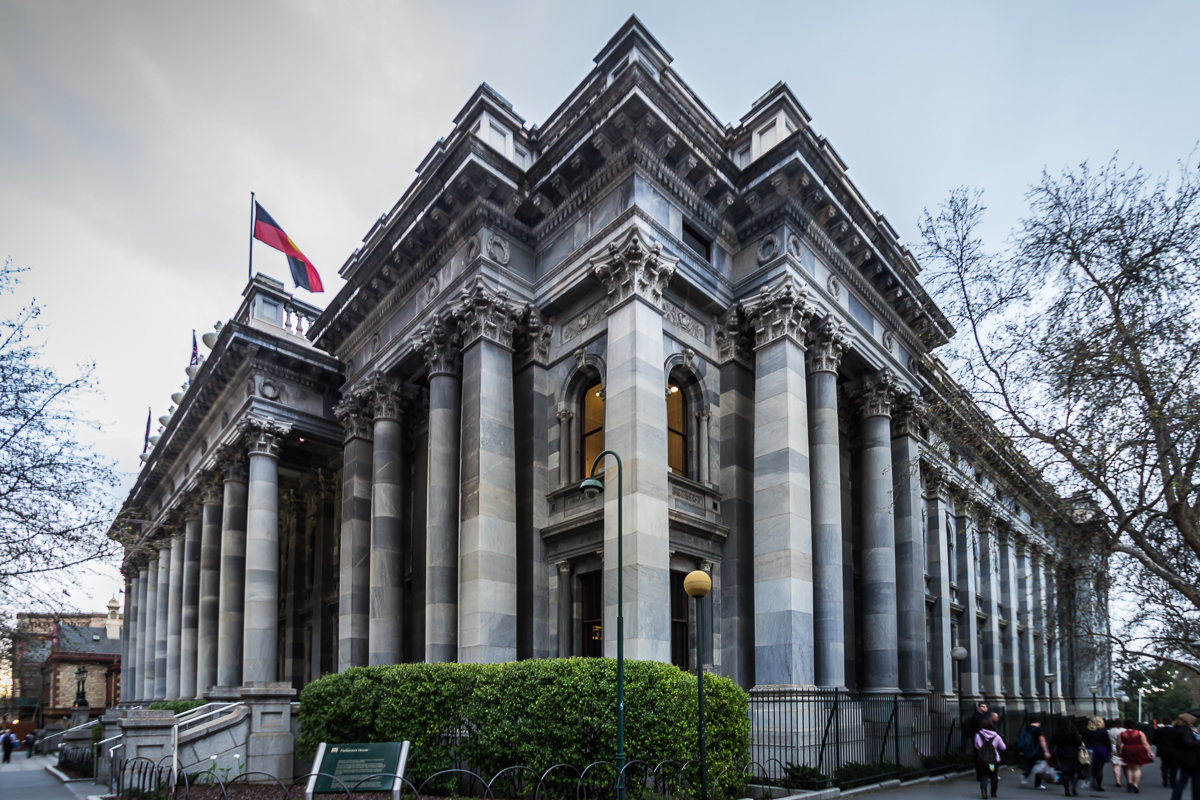

Overview
- Legislative body: Parliament of South Australia
- Meeting place: Parliament House
- Term: 3 May 2022 – 21 February 2026
- Election: 19 March 2022
- Government: Labor
- Opposition: Liberal

Legislative Council
- Members: Government (9): Labor (9); Opposition (8): Liberal (8); Crossbench (5): Independent (1) (Note: Tammy Franks.); Better Community (1); Fair Go (1); Greens (1); SA Best (1)
- President: Terry Stephens, Liberal
- Leader of the Government: Kyam Maher
- Leader of the Opposition: Nicola Centofanti
- Party control: Labor (minority)

House of Assembly
- Members: Government (29): Labor (29); Opposition (13): Liberal (13); Crossbench (4): Independent (4) (Note: Geoff Brock, Dan Cregan, Fraser Ellis, and Nick McBride.); 1 Vacant
- Speaker: Dan Cregan, Independent (until 11 April 2024); Leon Bignell, Labor (from 11 April 2024)
- Leader of Government Business: Tom Koutsantonis
- Government Whip: Lee Odenwalder
- Opposition Whip: David Pisoni
- Party control: Labor

Sessions
- 1st: 3 May 2022 – 21 February 2026

The 55th Parliament of South Australia was a meeting of the legislative branch of the South Australian state government, composed of the South Australian Legislative Council and the South Australian House of Assembly.

== Leadership ==
=== Legislative Council ===
Presiding officer

- President of the Legislative Council: Terry Stephens

Government leadership

- Leader of the Government: Kyam Maher
- Government Whip: Ian Hunter

Opposition leadership

- Leader of the Opposition: Nicola Centofanti
- Deputy Leader of the Opposition: Heidi Girolamo (from 22 January 2025)
- Opposition Whips: Laura Henderson, Dennis Hood (from 2 April 2025)

=== House of Assembly ===
Presiding officer

- Speaker of the House of Assembly: Dan Cregan (until 11 April 2024), Leon Bignell (from 11 April 2024)

Government leadership

- Leader of Government Business: Tom Koutsantonis
- Government Whip: Lee Odenwalder

Opposition leadership

- Opposition Whip: David Pisoni
- Manager of Opposition Business: Jack Batty (from 19 August 2024)

== Leadership elections ==
Terry Stephens was elected unopposed as the President of the Legislative Council. Ian Hunter, Tung Ngo, Russell Wortley, Justin Hanson, Irene Pnevmatikos, and Reggie Martin all rejected a nomination from Connie Bonaros.

Dan Cregan was elected unopposed as the Speaker of the House of Assembly. Following Cregan's resignation from the position, Leon Bignell was elected unopposed to the Speakership on 11 April 2024.

== Party summary ==
=== Legislative Council ===
Council membership (at dissolution) 1 Greens Liberal 8 9 Labor Fair Go 1 1 Independent 1 SA Best 1 Better Community

Date	Party (shading shows control)									Total	Vacant
Date	GRN	ALP	IND	ASA	SAB	LBC	LIB	FGA	ONP	Total	Vacant
End of previous Parliament	2	8	1	1	2	–	8	–	–	22	0
Begin (3 May 2022)	2	9	–	–	2	–	8	–	1	22	0
13 January 2023	2	9	–	–	2	–	7	–	1	21	1
7 March 2023	2	9	–	–	2	–	8	–	1	22	0
10 October 2023	2	8	–	–	2	–	8	–	1	21	1
17 October 2023	2	9	–	–	2	–	8	–	1	22	0
1 December 2023	2	9	1	–	1	–	8	–	1	22	0
11 January 2025	2	9	2	–	1	–	7	–	1	22	0
13 May 2025	1	9	3	–	1	–	7	–	1	22	0
18 May 2025	1	9	4	–	1	–	7	–	–	22	0
22 May 2025	1	9	3	–	1	1	7	–	–	22	0
24 July 2025	1	9	2	–	1	1	7	1	–	22	0
19 August 2025	1	9	1	–	1	1	8	1	–	22	0
Latest voting share %	4.55	40.91	4.55	0.00	4.55	4.55	36.36	4.55	0.00		

=== House of Assembly ===
House membership (at dissolution) 29 Labor Liberal 13 4 Independent 1 Vacant

Date	Party (shading shows control)			Total	Vacant
Date	ALP	IND	LIB	Total	Vacant
End of previous Parliament	19	6	22	47	0
Begin (3 May 2022)	27	4	16	47	0
31 May 2022	27	4	15	46	1
2 July 2022	27	4	16	47	0
6 July 2023	27	5	15	47	0
6 February 2024	27	5	14	46	1
23 March 2024	28	5	14	47	0
11 April 2024	27	6	14	47	0
15 October 2024	27	6	13	46	1
16 November 2024	28	6	13	47	0
2 September 2025	28	5	13	46	1
5 September 2025	29	4	13	46	1
Latest voting share %	63.04	8.70	28.26		

== Membership ==
=== Legislative Council ===
11 of the 22 seats in the upper house were contested in the election on 19 March 2022. Members elected in 2022 are marked with an asterisk (*).

▌ Connie Bonaros
▌ Emily Bourke
▌ Nicola Centofanti*
▌ Mira El Dannawi
▌ Tammy Franks
▌ Sarah Game*
▌ Heidi Girolamo
▌ Justin Hanson
▌ Laura Henderson*
▌ Ben Hood
▌ Dennis Hood*

▌ Ian Hunter*
▌ Jing Lee
▌ Michelle Lensink*
▌ Kyam Maher*
▌ Reggie Martin*
▌ Tung Ngo*
▌ Frank Pangallo
▌ Clare Scriven
▌ Robert Simms*
▌ Terry Stephens
▌ Russell Wortley*

=== House of Assembly ===
All 47 seats in the lower house were contested in the election on 19 March 2022.

▌ Sarah Andrews (Gibson)
▌ David Basham (Finniss)
▌ Jack Batty (Bragg)
▌ Troy Bell (Mount Gambier)
▌ Zoe Bettison (Ramsay)
▌ Leon Bignell (Mawson)
▌ Blair Boyer (Wright)
▌ Geoff Brock (Stuart)
▌ Michael Brown (Florey)
▌ Nick Champion (Taylor)
▌ Nadia Clancy (Elder)
▌ Susan Close (Port Adelaide)
▌ Nat Cook (Hurtle Vale)
▌ Matt Cowdrey (Colton)
▌ Dan Cregan (Kavel)
▌ Alex Dighton (Black)

▌ Fraser Ellis (Narungga)
▌ John Fulbrook (Playford)
▌ John Gardner (Morialta)
▌ Katrine Hildyard (Reynell)
▌ Lucy Hood (Adelaide)
▌ Eddie Hughes (Giles)
▌ Ashton Hurn (Schubert)
▌ Catherine Hutchesson (Waite)
▌ Tom Koutsantonis (West Torrens)
▌ Peter Malinauskas (Croydon)
▌ Nick McBride (MacKillop)
▌ Andrea Michaels (Enfield)
▌ Stephen Mullighan (Lee)
▌ Lee Odenwalder (Elizabeth)
▌ Cressida O'Hanlon (Dunstan)
▌ Stephen Patterson (Morphett)

▌ Rhiannon Pearce (King)
▌ Adrian Pederick (Hammond)
▌ Tony Piccolo (Light)
▌ Chris Picton (Kaurna)
▌ David Pisoni (Unley)
▌ Penny Pratt (Frome)
▌ Olivia Savvas (Newland)
▌ Jayne Stinson (Badcoe)
▌ Joe Szakacs (Cheltenham)
▌ Vincent Tarzia (Hartley)
▌ Josh Teague (Heysen)
▌ Sam Telfer (Flinders)
▌ Erin Thompson (Davenport)
▌ Tim Whetstone (Chaffey)
▌ Dana Wortley (Torrens)

== Changes of membership ==
=== Legislative Council ===
Before		Change		After		
Member	Party	Type	Date	Date	Member	Party
Stephen Wade	Liberal	Retired	13 January 2023	7 March 2023	Ben Hood	Liberal
Irene Pnevmatikos	Labor	Resigned	10 October 2023	17 October 2023	Mira El Dannawi	Labor
Frank Pangallo	SA Best	Resigned from party	1 December 2023		Frank Pangallo	Independent
Jing Lee	Liberal	Resigned from party	11 January 2025		Jing Lee	Independent
Tammy Franks	Greens	Resigned from party	13 May 2025		Tammy Franks	Independent
Sarah Game	One Nation	Resigned from party	18 May 2025		Sarah Game	Independent
Jing Lee	Independent	New party	22 May 2025		Jing Lee	Better Community
Sarah Game	Independent	New party	24 July 2025		Sarah Game	Fair Go
Frank Pangallo	Independent	Joined party	19 August 2025		Frank Pangallo	Liberal

=== House of Assembly ===
Seat	Before		Change		After		
Seat	Member	Party	Type	Date	Date	Member	Party
Bragg	Vickie Chapman	Liberal	Resigned	31 May 2022	2 July 2022	Jack Batty	Liberal
MacKillop	Nick McBride	Liberal	Resigned from party	6 July 2023		Nick McBride	Independent
Dunstan	Steven Marshall	Liberal	Retired	6 February 2024	23 March 2024	Cressida O'Hanlon	Labor
Mawson	Leon Bignell	Labor	Elected as speaker	11 April 2024		Leon Bignell	Independent
Black	David Speirs	Liberal	Resigned	15 October 2024	16 November 2024	Alex Dighton	Labor
Mount Gambier	Troy Bell	Independent	Resigned	2 September 2025	Vacant		
Mawson	Leon Bignell	Independent (Speaker)	Rejoined party	5 September 2025		Leon Bignell	Labor

- Note: Constitution (Independent Speaker) Amendment Act 2021 requires the Speaker of the South Australian House of Assembly to be Independent. However, the Speaker can rejoin their party within 6 months of an election.

== See also ==
- Members of the South Australian Legislative Council, 2022–2026
- Members of the South Australian House of Assembly, 2022–2026
