= 56th Parliament of South Australia =

Current meeting of the South Australian Parliament

Fifty-sixth Parliament of South Australia
←	55th	57th	→
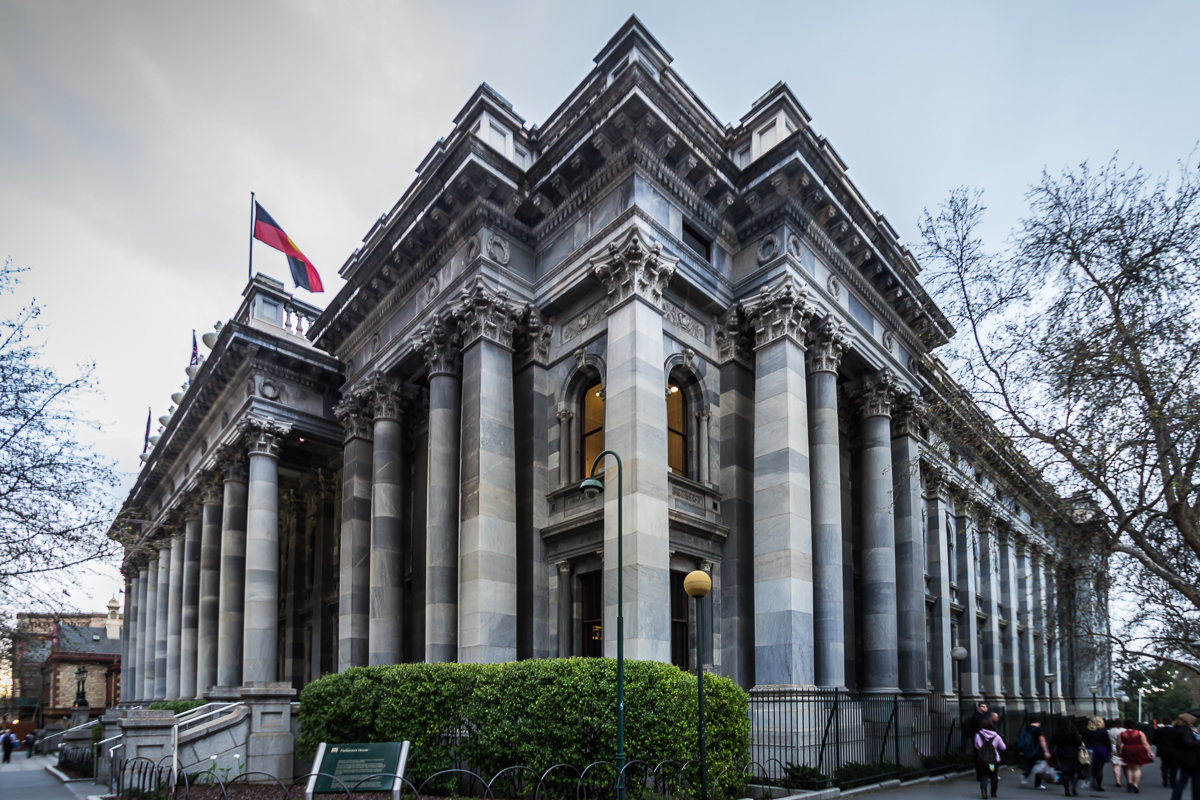

Overview
- Legislative body: Parliament of South Australia
- Meeting place: Parliament House
- Term: 5 May 2026 – present
- Election: 21 March 2026
- Government: Labor
- Opposition: Liberal

Legislative Council
- Members: Government (10): Labor (10); Opposition (6): Liberal (6); Crossbench (6): One Nation (3); Greens (2); Family First (1)
- President: Reggie Martin
- Leader of the Government: Kyam Maher
- Leader of the Opposition: Nicola Centofanti
- Party control: Labor (minority)

House of Assembly
- Members: Government (33): Labor (33); Opposition (5): Liberal (5); Crossbench (9): Independent (5) (Note: Geoff Brock, Nat Cook (Speaker), Travis Fatchen, Lou Nicholson, and Matt Schultz.); One Nation (4)
- Speaker: Nat Cook
- Leader of Government Business: Tom Koutsantonis
- Party control: Labor

Sessions
- 1st: 5 May 2026 – present

The 56th Parliament of South Australia is the current meeting of the legislative branch of the South Australian state government, composed of the South Australian Legislative Council and the South Australian House of Assembly.

== Leadership ==
=== Legislative Council ===
Presiding officer

- President of the Legislative Council: Reggie Martin

Government leadership

- Leader of the Government: Kyam Maher

Opposition leadership

- Leader of the Opposition: Nicola Centofanti

=== House of Assembly ===
Presiding officer

- Speaker of the House of Assembly: Nat Cook

Government leadership

- Leader of Government Business: Tom Koutsantonis

== Party summary ==
=== Legislative Council ===
Council membership (as of 16 June 2026) 2 Greens Liberal 6 10 Labor Family First 1 One Nation 3

Date	Party (shading shows control)									Total	Vacant
Date	GRN	ALP	IND	SAB	LBC	LIB	FGA	FFP	ONP	Total	Vacant
End of previous Parliament	1	9	1	1	1	8	1	–	–	22	0
Begin (5 May 2026)	2	10	–	–	–	6	1	–	3	22	0
16 June 2026	2	10	–	–	–	6	–	1	3	22	0
Latest voting share %	9.09	45.45	–	–	–	27.27	–	4.55	13.64		

=== House of Assembly ===
House membership (as of 5 May 2026) 33 Labor Liberal 5 One Nation 4 5 Independent

Date	Party (shading shows control)				Total	Vacant
Date	ALP	IND	LIB	ONP	Total	Vacant
End of previous Parliament	29	4	13	–	47	0
Begin (5 May 2026)	33	5	5	4	47	0
Latest voting share %	70.21	10.64	10.64	8.51		

== Membership ==
=== Legislative Council ===
11 of the 22 seats in the upper house were contested in the election on 21 March 2026. Members elected in 2026 are marked with an asterisk (*).

▌ Cory Bernardi*
▌ Emily Bourke*
▌ Nicola Centofanti
▌ Mira El Dannawi*
▌ Sarah Game
▌ Heidi Girolamo*
▌ Hilton Gumbys*
▌ Justin Hanson*
▌ Laura Henderson
▌ Rebecca Hewett*
▌ Ben Hood*

▌ Dennis Hood
▌ Ian Hunter
▌ Michelle Lensink
▌ Kyam Maher
▌ Reggie Martin
▌ Tung Ngo
▌ Carlos Quaremba*
▌ Clare Scriven*
▌ Melanie Selwood*
▌ Robert Simms
▌ Russell Wortley

=== House of Assembly ===
All 47 seats in the lower house were contested in the election on 21 March 2026.

▌ James Agness (Light)
▌ Sarah Andrews (Gibson)
▌ Jack Batty (Bragg)
▌ Lawrence Ben (Enfield)
▌ Zoe Bettison (Ramsay)
▌ Aria Bolkus (Colton)
▌ Blair Boyer (Wright)
▌ Geoff Brock (Stuart)
▌ Michael Brown (Florey)
▌ Nick Champion (Taylor)
▌ Nadia Clancy (Elder)
▌ Nat Cook (Hurtle Vale)
▌ Alex Dighton (Black)
▌ Travis Fatchen (Mount Gambier)
▌ Katrine Hildyard (Reynell)
▌ Lucy Hood (Adelaide)

▌ Eddie Hughes (Giles)
▌ Tom Koutsantonis (West Torrens)
▌ Peter Malinauskas (Croydon)
▌ Matthew Marozzi (Morialta)
▌ Jenni Mitton (Mawson)
▌ Cressida O'Hanlon (Dunstan)
▌ John Fulbrook (Playford)
▌ Ashton Hurn (Schubert)
▌ Catherine Hutchesson (Waite)
▌ Lou Nicholson (Finniss)
▌ David Paton (Ngadjuri)
▌ Rhiannon Pearce (King)
▌ Chris Picton (Kaurna)
▌ Toby Priest (Morphett)
▌ Cheyne Rich (Port Adelaide)
▌ Jenn Roberts (Hartley)

▌ Alice Rolls (Unley)
▌ Robert Roylance (Hammond)
▌ Olivia Savvas (Newland)
▌ Matt Schultz (Kavel)
▌ Ella Shaw (Elizabeth)
▌ Meagan Spencer (Torrens)
▌ Jayne Stinson (Badcoe)
▌ Joe Szakacs (Cheltenham)
▌ Josh Teague (Heysen)
▌ Sam Telfer (Flinders)
▌ Chantelle Thomas (Narungga)
▌ Erin Thompson (Davenport)
▌ Jason Virgo (MacKillop)
▌ Tim Whetstone (Chaffey)
▌ David Wilkins (Lee)

== Changes of membership ==
=== Legislative Council ===
Before		Change		After		
Member	Party	Type	Date	Date	Member	Party
Sarah Game	Fair Go	Defected	16 June 2026		Sarah Game	Family First

=== House of Assembly ===
Seat	Before		Change		After		
Seat	Member	Party	Type	Date	Date	Member	Party
Hurtle Vale	Nat Cook	Labor	Elected as speaker	5 May 2026		Nat Cook	Independent

== See also ==
- Members of the South Australian Legislative Council, 2026–2030
- Members of the South Australian House of Assembly, 2026–2030
