= Tarzia shadow ministry =

The shadow ministry of Vincent Tarzia is the Liberal Party opposition since August 2024, opposing the Malinauskas government of the Labor Party in the Parliament of South Australia. It is led by Vincent Tarzia following his election as party leader and leader of the opposition on 12 August 2024. The deputy leader of the shadow ministry is John Gardner.

The shadow ministry succeeded the Spiers shadow ministry as the Liberal Party shadow cabinet.

== Shadow cabinet ==
=== Current arrangement ===
The current Tarzia shadow ministry was announced on 21 January 2025, after John Gardner's retirement announcement and Jing Lee's resignation from the party.

Officeholder	Office(s)	Image
Vincent Tarzia MP	Leader of the Opposition; Shadow Minister for Business	
Josh Teague MP	Deputy Leader of the Opposition; Shadow Attorney-General; Shadow Minister for Aboriginal Affairs; Shadow Minister for Child Protection; Shadow Minister for Multicultural Affairs	
Nicola Centofanti MLC	Leader of the Opposition in the Legislative Council; Shadow Minister for Primary Industries; Shadow Minister for Regional South Australia; Shadow Minister for Water Resources and the River Murray	
Heidi Girolamo MLC	Deputy Leader of the Opposition in the Legislative Council; Shadow Minister for Cost of Living; Shadow Minister for Education; Shadow Minister for Finance; Shadow Minister for Tax Reform	
Michelle Lensink MLC	Shadow Minister for Housing; Shadow Minister for Human Services; Shadow Minister for Planning; Shadow Minister for Women and the Prevention of Domestic, Family and Sexual Violence	
Ashton Hurn MP	Shadow Minister for Health	
Sam Telfer MP	Shadow Treasurer; Shadow Minister for Local Government	
Jack Batty MP	Shadow Minister for Community Safety, Police and Correctional Services; Shadow Minister for Road Safety; Shadow Minister for the Future Economy; Shadow Minister for Arts and Festivals	
Stephen Patterson MP	Shadow Minister for Defence and Space Industries; Shadow Minister for Energy; Shadow Minister for Mining; Shadow Minister for Nuclear Readiness	
Matt Cowdrey MP	Shadow Minister for Sport; Shadow Minister for Training and Skills; Shadow Minister for Workforce and Population Growth	
Penny Pratt MP	Shadow Minister for Ageing; Shadow Minister for Mental Health and Suicide Prevention; Shadow Minister for Regional Health Services; Shadow Minister for Tourism	
Tim Whetstone MP	Shadow Minister for Emergency Services; Shadow Minister for Recreation and Racing; Shadow Minister for Social Services; Shadow Minister for Trade, Industry and Investment	
Adrian Pederick MP	Shadow Minister for Marine Infrastructure; Shadow Minister for Regional Roads; Shadow Minister for Veterans Affairs	
Ben Hood MLC	Shadow Minister for Government Accountability; Shadow Minister for Hospitality; Shadow Minister for Industrial Relations and Public Sector; Shadow Minister for Infrastructure and Transport	
David Basham MP	Shadow Minister for Environment; Shadow Minister for Water Infrastructure	

=== First arrangement ===
The first Tarzia shadow ministry was announced on 19 August 2024 after Tarzia was elected as party leader. There were some changes to the roles of the previous Speirs shadow ministry, including the elevation of Ben Hood to the shadow ministry.

Officeholder	Office(s)	Image
Vincent Tarzia MP	Leader of the Opposition; Shadow Minister for Business and Hospitality	
John Gardner MP	Deputy Leader of the Opposition; Shadow Minister for Workforce and Population Strategy; Shadow Minister for Education, Training and Skills; Shadow Minister for the Arts and Festivals	
Nicola Centofanti MLC	Shadow Minister for Regional South Australia; Shadow Minister for Primary Industries; Shadow Minister for Water Resources and the River Murray; Shadow Minister for Veterans Affairs; Leader of the Opposition in the Legislative Council	
Jing Lee MLC	Shadow Minister for Tourism; Shadow Minister for Multicultural Affairs; Deputy Leader of the Opposition in the Legislative Council	
Michelle Lensink MLC	Shadow Minister for Housing; Shadow Minister for Human Services; Shadow Minister for Women and the Prevention of Domestic, Family and Sexual Violence; Shadow Minister for Planning	
Ashton Hurn MP	Shadow Minister for Health	
Josh Teague MP	Shadow Attorney-General; Shadow Minister for Aboriginal Affairs; Shadow Minister for Child Protection; hadow Minister for Industrial Relations and Public Sector	
Jack Batty MP	Shadow Minister for Community Safety, Police and Correctional Services; Shadow Minister for Road Safety; Shadow Minister for the Future Economy; Shadow Minister for Arts and Festivals	
Stephen Patterson MP	Shadow Minister for Energy and Net Zero; Shadow Minister for Mining; Shadow Minister for Defence and Space Industries	
Matt Cowdrey MP	Shadow Minister for Sport; Shadow Minister for Environment	
Penny Pratt MP	Shadow Minister for Regional Health Services; Shadow Minister for Ageing; Shadow Minister for Mental Health and Suicide Prevention	
Heidi Girolamo MLC	Shadow Minister for Finance; Shadow Minister for Tax Reform; Shadow Minister Cost of Living	
Tim Whetstone MP	Shadow Minister for Emergency Services; Shadow Minister for Trade, Industry and Investment; Shadow Minister for Racing; Shadow Minister for Recreation	
Adrian Pederick MP	Shadow Assistant Minister for Racing; Shadow Assistant Minister for Veterans Affairs; Shadow Assistant Minister to the Leader of the Opposition	
Sam Telfer MP	Shadow Treasurer; Shadow Minister for Local Government	
Ben Hood MLC	Shadow Minister for Government Accountability; Shadow Minister for Infrastructure and Transport; Shadow Minister for Regional Roads	

== See also ==
- Malinauskas ministry
