= Members of the South Australian Legislative Council, 2026–2030 =

This is a list of members of the South Australian Legislative Council between 2026 and 2030. As half of the Legislative Council's terms expired at each state election, half of these members were elected at the 2026 South Australian Legislative Council election.

Government (10) Labor (10) Opposition (6) Liberal (6) Crossbench (6) One Nation (3) Greens (2) Family First (1)

== List ==
Name	Party	Term expires	Term of office
Cory Bernardi	One Nation	2034	2026–present
Emily Bourke	Labor	2034	2018–present
Nicola Centofanti	Liberal	2030	2020–present
Mira El Dannawi	Labor	2034	2023–present
Sarah Game	Fair Go/Family First	2030	2022–present
Heidi Girolamo	Liberal	2034	2021–present
Hilton Gumbys	Labor	2034	2026–present
Justin Hanson	Labor	2034	2017–present
Laura Henderson	Liberal	2030	2022–present
Rebecca Hewett	One Nation	2034	2026–present
Ben Hood	Liberal	2034	2023–present
Dennis Hood	Liberal	2030	2006–present
Ian Hunter	Labor	2030	2006–present
Michelle Lensink	Liberal	2030	2003–present
Kyam Maher	Labor	2030	2012–present
Reggie Martin	Labor	2030	2022–present
Tung Ngo	Labor	2030	2014–present
Carlos Quaremba	One Nation	2034	2026–present
Clare Scriven	Labor	2034	2018–present
Melanie Selwood	Greens	2034	2026–present
Robert Simms	Greens	2030	2021–present
Russell Wortley	Labor	2030	2006–present

== See also ==
- Members of the South Australian House of Assembly, 2026–2030
