= Shadow cabinet of South Australia =

The Opposition (see Opposition (Australia), Opposition (politics)), in the Australian state of South Australia comprises the largest non-Government party not in Parliament. The Opposition's purpose is to hold the Government to account and constitute a "Government-in-waiting" should the existing Government fall. To that end, a Leader of the Opposition and Shadow Ministers for the various government departments question the Premier and Ministers on Government policy and administration, and formulate the policy the Opposition would pursue in Government. It is sometimes styled "His Majesty's Loyal Opposition" to demonstrate that although it opposes the Government, it remains loyal to the King.

The current Leader of the Opposition is South Australian Liberal Party Leader Ashton Hurn, and Josh Teague is the Deputy Leader.

== Current Shadow Ministry ==
Party	Shadow Minister	Portrait	Offices	Electorate
Liberal	Ashton Hurn (born 1991)	Ashton Hurn	Leader of the Opposition; Leader of the South Australia Liberal Party; Shadow Minister for Defence and Space Industries; Shadow Minister for Trade, Industry and Investment	Schubert (2022–)
Liberal	Josh Teague (born 1975)		Deputy Leader of the Opposition; Deputy Leader of the South Australia Liberal Party; Shadow Attorney-General; Shadow Minister for Housing; Shadow Minister for Planning; Shadow Minister for Aboriginal Affairs	Heysen (2018–)
Liberal	Hon Nicola Centofanti (born 1982)	Nicola Centofanti	Leader of the Opposition in the Legislative Council; Leader of the South Australia Liberal Party in the Legislative Council; Shadow Minister for Primary Industries and Regional Development; Shadow Minister for Environment and Water	Legislative Council (2020–)
Liberal	Hon Heidi Girolamo (born 1983)		Deputy Leader of the Opposition in the Legislative Council; Deputy Leader of the South Australia Liberal Party in the Legislative Council; Shadow Minister for Education, Training and Skills; Shadow Minister for Arts	Legislative Council (2021–)
Liberal	Hon Ben Hood (born 1980)	Ben Hood	Shadow Treasurer; Shadow Minister for Small and Family Business; Shadow Minister for Energy and Mining; Shadow Minister for Industrial Relations and Public Sector	Legislative Council (2023–)
Liberal	Jack Batty (born 1990)		Shadow Minister for Health and Wellbeing; Manager of Opposition Business in the House of Assembly	Bragg (2022–)
Liberal	Hon Michelle Lensink (born 1970)	Michelle Lensink	Shadow Minister for Human Services; Shadow Minister for Women; Shadow Minister for Seniors and Aging; Shadow Minister for Multicultural Affairs	Legislative Council (2003–)
Liberal	Tim Whetstone (born 1960)	Tim Whetstone	Shadow Minister for Police; Shadow Minister for Correctional Services; Shadow Minister for Emergency Services	Chaffey (2010–)
Liberal	Sam Telfer (born 1985)		Shadow Minister for Infrastructure and Transport; Shadow Minister for Local Government; Shadow Minister for Regional Roads; Shadow Minister for Road Safety	Flinders (2022–)
Liberal	Hon Dennis Hood (born 1970)	Dennis Hood	Shadow Minister for Veteran Affairs; Shadow Minister for Tourism; Shadow Minister for Recreation, Sport and Racing	Legislative Council (2006–)
Liberal	Hon Laura Henderson (born 1996 or 1997)		Shadow Minister for Child Protection; Shadow Minister for the Prevention of Domestic, Family and Sexual Violence	Legislative Council (2022–)

== See also ==
- Government of South Australia
- Opposition (Australia)
- Opposition (politics)
