= Marshall ministry =

73rd ministry of the Government of South Australia

- 73rd ministry of South Australia

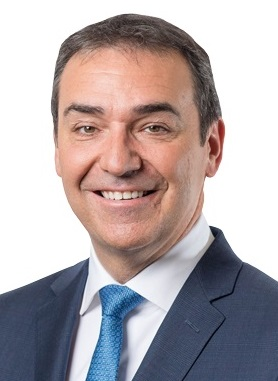
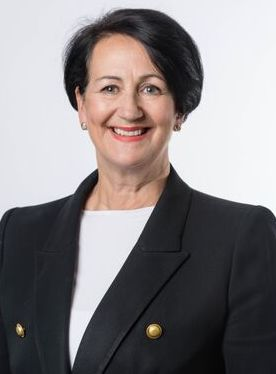
- Steven Marshall Vickie Chapman
- Date formed: 19 March 2018
- Date dissolved: 21 March 2022

People and organisations
- Monarch: Elizabeth II
- Governor: Hieu Van Le; Frances Adamson
- Premier: Steven Marshall
- Deputy premier: Vickie Chapman; Dan van Holst Pellekaan
- No. of ministers: 15
- Member party: Liberal
- Status in legislature: Majority government (2018–2021); Minority government (2021–2022)
- Opposition party: Labor
- Opposition leader: Peter Malinauskas

History
- Election: 17 March 2018
- Outgoing election: 19 March 2022
- Predecessor: Weatherill ministry
- Successor: Malinauskas ministry

The Marshall ministry (Liberal) was the 73rd ministry of the Government of South Australia. It was led by the state's 46th premier, Steven Marshall. The Marshall ministry succeeded the Weatherill ministry on 19 March 2018, following the Liberal Party's victory at the state election held on 17 March. It was replaced by the first Malinauskas ministry on 21 March 2022 following the state election held on 19 March, which saw Labor, led by Peter Malinauskas, defeat the Liberals and form a majority government.

== Cabinet ==
Party	Portrait	Minister	Portfolio
Liberal		Steven Marshall (1968–) MP for Dunstan (2014–2024)	Premier; Leader of the South Australian Liberal Party
Liberal		Vickie Chapman (1957–) MP for Bragg (2002–2022)	Deputy Premier (until 23 November 2021); Deputy Leader of the South Australian Liberal Party (until November 2021); Attorney-General (functions and powers exercised by Josh Teague from 23 November 2021); Minister for Planning and Local Government (29 July 2020 – 23 November 2021)
Liberal		Rob Lucas (1953–) MLC (1982–2022)	Treasurer; Leader of the Government in the Legislative Council
Liberal		John Gardner (1979–) MP for Morialta (2010–2026)	Minister for Education; Leader of Government Business in the House of Assembly (until 5 February 2020)
Liberal		David Ridgway (1960–) MLC (2002–2021)	Minister for Trade, Tourism and Investment (until 13 January 2020); Minister for Trade and Investment (13 January 2020 – 26 July 2020)
Liberal		Michelle Lensink (1970–) MLC (2003–)	Minister for Human Services
Liberal		David Pisoni (1963–) MP for Unley (2006–2026)	Minister for Industry and Skills (until 1 April 2019); Minister for Innovation and Skills (from 1 April 2019)
Liberal		Stephen Wade (1960–) MLC (2006–2023)	Minister for Health and Wellbeing
Liberal		Dan van Holst Pellekaan MP for Stuart (2010–2022)	Deputy Premier (from 23 November 2021); Deputy Leader of the South Australian Liberal Party (from November 2021); Minister for Energy and Mining; Leader of Government Business in the House of Assembly (from 29 July 2020)
Liberal		Rachel Sanderson MP for Adelaide (2010–2022)	Minister for Child Protection
Liberal		Tim Whetstone (1960–) MP for Chaffey (2010–)	Minister for Primary Industries and Regional Development (until 26 July 2020)
Liberal		Corey Wingard (1971–) MP for Gibson (2018–2022)	Minister for Police, Emergency Services and Correctional Services (until 29 July 2020); Minister for Recreation, Sport and Racing; Minister for Infrastructure and Transport (from 29 July 2020)
Liberal		David Speirs (1984–) MP for Black (2018–2024)	Minister for Environment and Water
Liberal		Stephan Knoll MP for Schubert (2014–2022)	Minister for Transport, Infrastructure and Local Government (until 26 July 2020); Minister for Planning (until 26 July 2020); Leader of Government Business in the House of Assembly (5 February 2020 – 26 July 2020)
Liberal		David Basham (1968–) MP for Finniss (2018–2026)	Minister for Primary Industries and Regional Development (from 29 July 2020)
Liberal		Stephen Patterson (1971–) MP for Morphett (2018–2026)	Minister for Trade and Investment (from 29 July 2020)
Liberal		Vincent Tarzia (1986–) MP for Hartley (2014–2026)	Minister for Police, Emergency Services and Correctional Services (from 29 July 2020)
Liberal		Josh Teague (1975–) MP for Heysen (2018–)	Minister for Planning and Local Government (from 23 November 2021); Acting Attorney-General (from 23 November 2021)

=== Assistant ministers ===
Party	Portrait	Minister	Portfolio
Liberal		Carolyn Power MP for Elder (2018–2022)	Assistant Minister for Domestic and Family Violence Prevention
Liberal		Jing Lee MLC (2010–2026)	Assistant Minister to the Premier

== Changes to the ministry ==
=== March 2018: Formation ===
An interim three-member ministry was sworn in by the Governor of South Australia on 19 March 2018, comprising Steven Marshall as Premier, Vickie Chapman as Deputy Premier and Attorney-General, and Rob Lucas as Treasurer. Marshall initially held the remaining portfolios. The full ministry was sworn in on 22 March 2018, when these responsibilities were distributed among the incoming ministers. However, this ministry did not include a Minister for the Arts, and the department was subsequently dismantled, with its functions transferred to the Department of the Premier and Cabinet.

=== March 2019: Innovation and skills portfolio ===
On 7 March 2019, the title of Minister for Industry and Skills was changed to Minister for Innovation and Skills.

=== January 2020: Tourism portfolio ===
On 13 January 2020, responsibility for tourism was transferred from the Minister for Trade, Tourism and Investment to the Premier.

=== July 2020: Resignations and reshuffle ===
On 26 July 2020, Minister for Transport, Infrastructure and Local Government Stephan Knoll, Minister for Primary Industries and Regional Development Tim Whetstone, and Minister for Trade and Investment David Ridgway resigned from the ministry amid an expenses scandal.

Marshall announced a reshuffle on 28 July, and the new ministers were sworn in on 29 July. David Basham, Stephen Patterson and Vincent Tarzia entered the cabinet. Chapman assumed responsibility for planning and local government, while Corey Wingard became Minister for Infrastructure and Transport. Dan van Holst Pellekaan was appointed Leader of Government Business in the House of Assembly. Lucas retained responsibility for government business in the Legislative Council. Tarzia's appointment to the ministry left the position of Speaker of the House of Assembly vacant.

=== November 2021: Deputy premier and acting attorney-general ===
On 22 November 2021, Chapman announced her resignation as Deputy Premier and Minister for Planning and Local Government following a parliamentary vote of no confidence in her. She remained a member of cabinet and retained the substantive appointment as Attorney-General, but stood aside from performing its duties.

Van Holst Pellekaan was elected deputy leader of the Liberal Party and sworn in as Deputy Premier on 23 November. Josh Teague was appointed Minister for Planning and Local Government and assumed the duties of Attorney-General in an acting capacity.
