= 2030 South Australian First Nations Voice election =

Election for a legislated body of Indigenous Australian representatives

- 16 March 2030

The 2030 South Australian First Nations Voice election will be held on 16 March 2030 to elect the First Nations Voice to Parliament, an advisory body for Indigenous Australians in the Parliament of South Australia. The election will be held on the same day as the South Australian state election.
