= South Australian Legislative Council =

Upper house of the parliament in South Australia

Legislative Council
- 56th Parliament

Type
- Type: Upper house of the Parliament of South Australia

History
- Founded: 1836; 190 years ago

Leadership
- President: Reggie Martin, Labor since 5 May 2026
- Leader of the Government: Kyam Maher, Labor since 24 March 2022
- Leader of the Opposition: Nicola Centofanti, Liberal since 21 April 2022

Structure
- Seats: 22
- Political groups: Government (10): Labor (10); Opposition (6): Liberal (6); Crossbench (6): One Nation (3); Greens (2); Family First (1)
- Length of term: 8 years

Elections
- Voting system: Single transferable vote
- First election: 21 February 1851 as unicameral 9 March 1857 as bicameral
- Last election: 21 March 2026
- Next election: March 2030

Meeting place
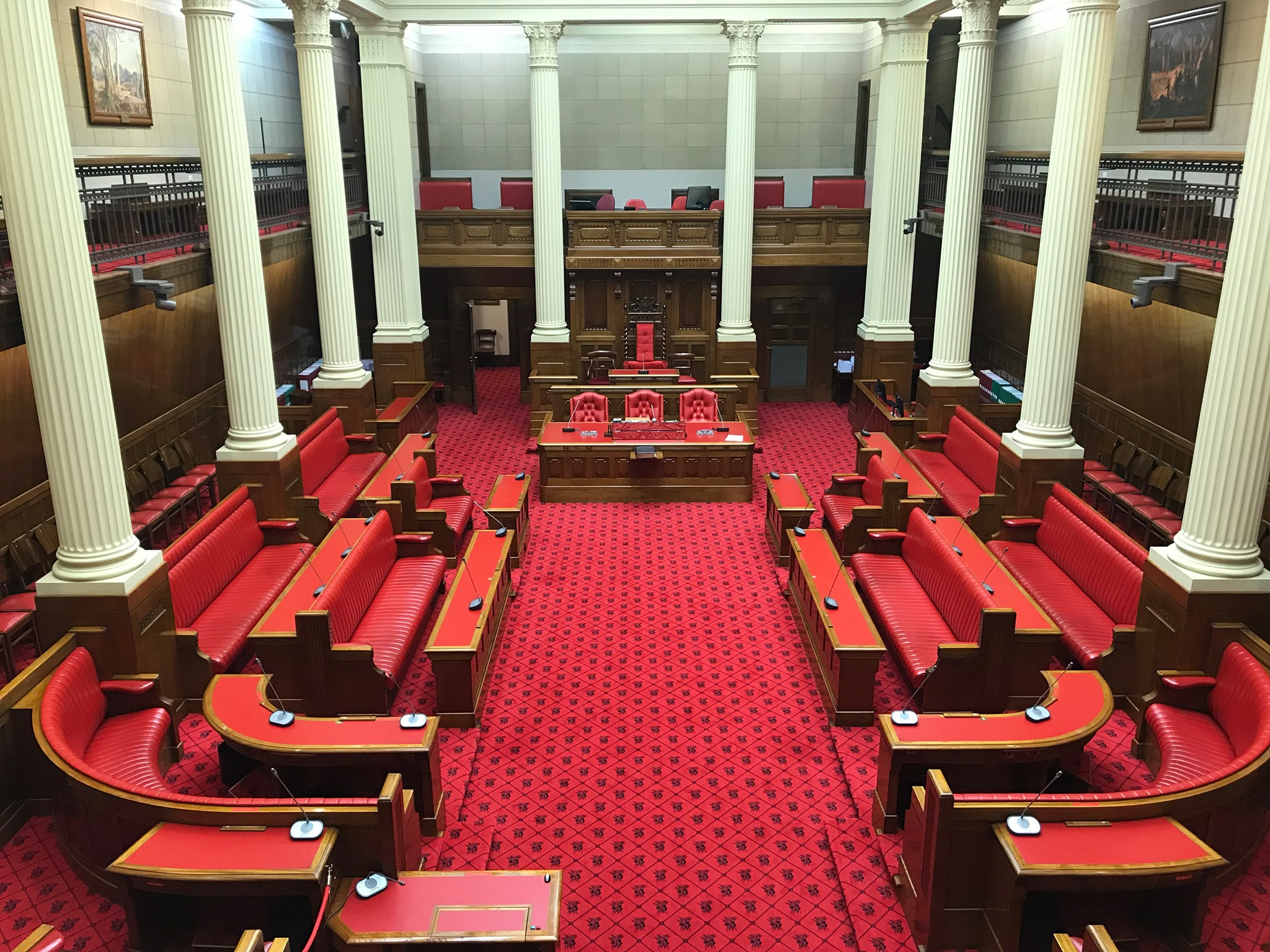
- Legislative Council Chamber; Parliament House, Adelaide, South Australia, Australia

Website
- SA Legislative Council

The Legislative Council is the upper house of the bicameral Parliament of South Australia, the lower house being the House of Assembly.

Its central purpose is to act as a house of review for legislation passed through the House of Assembly. It sits in Parliament House in the state capital, Adelaide. The upper house has 22 members, elected for staggered eight-year terms by proportional representation. Half of the members face re-election every four years. It is elected in a similar manner to its federal counterpart, the Senate. Casual vacancies—where a member resigns or dies—are filled by a joint sitting of both houses, who then elect a replacement.

== History ==
=== Advisory council ===
At the founding of the Province of South Australia under the South Australia Act 1834 (4 & 5 Will. 4. c. 95 (Imp)), governance of the new colony was divided between the Governor of South Australia and a Resident Commissioner, who reported to a new body known as the South Australian Colonization Commission. Under this arrangement, there was also a governing council comprising the Governor, the Judge or Chief Justice, the Colonial Secretary, the Advocate-General and the Resident Commissioner, with broad legislative and executive powers including the imposition of rates, duties, and taxes. This council was sometimes referred to as the "Legislative Council". Confusion and dispute about the division of power between the two roles led to the South Australia Government Act 1838, which combined the role of Resident Commissioner with that of the Governor.

In 1842, the South Australia Act 1842 (5 & 6 Vict. c. 61 (Imp)) was passed in order to replace the South Australian Colonisation Commission appointed in 1834 with a more standard British model of government, with a Governor advised by a Legislative Council. The 1842 act gave the British Government, which was responsible for appointing a Governor and at least seven other officers to the Legislative Council, full control of South Australia as a Crown Colony, after financial mismanagement by the first administration had nearly bankrupted the colony.

This new Legislative Council was the first true parliamentary body in South Australia. The act also made provision for a commission to initiate the establishment of democratic government, electoral districts, requirements for voting rights, and terms of office. Although the old governing Council advising the Governor met at Government House, this new Legislative Council met at a new purpose built chamber on North Terrace. This chamber eventually grew into what is now known as "Old Parliament House".

The council was originally appointed by the Governor, then Sir George Grey, and only served in an advisory capacity, as the Governor retained almost all legislative powers. It was expanded slightly in 1843, when several prominent landowners were allowed to join. In the same year, proceedings were opened to the general public.

Public demand for some form of representative government had been growing throughout the 1840s, and this was reflected in a series of reforms in 1851, which created a partially representative Legislative Council. After the changes, it consisted of 24 members, four official (filling what would be today ministerial positions) and four non-official members, both nominated by the governor on behalf of the Crown, and 16 elected members. The right to vote for these positions was not universal, being limited to propertied men. The reforms meant that the Governor no longer oversaw proceedings, with the role being filled by a Speaker who had been elected by the members.

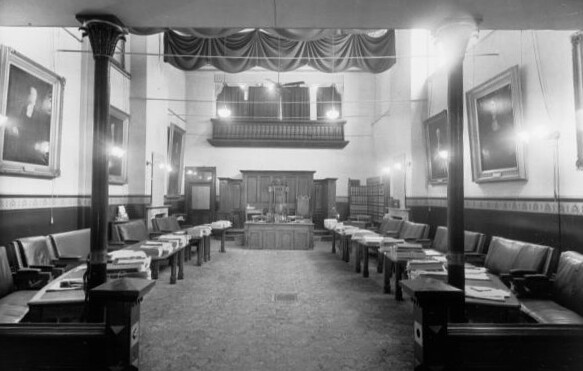
The Legislative Council chamber in Old Parliament House in 1939

=== Self-government ===
In 1856, the Legislative Council passed the Constitution Act 1856 (SA), which prepared what was to become the 1857 Constitution of South Australia. This laid out the means for true self-government, and created a bicameral system, which involved delegating most of its legislative powers to the new House of Assembly. While all adult males could vote in the new Assembly, the Council continued to limit voting rights to the wealthier classes. Suffrage was male-only and dependent upon certain property and wage requirements. The entire province was a single electorate for the Legislative Council, electing 18 members, with the scheme originally set up so that 6 members would be elected every 4 years to serve a 12 year term.

The council had its purpose in replicating the British House of Lords as a restricted "house of review" in a colonial context. When the Province of South Australia received its original constitution in 1857, it was the most democratic in the British Empire, combining a universal-suffrage lower house (the House of Assembly), with a restricted-suffrage upper house (the Legislative Council). The purpose of the Legislative Council was, as with the 19th century House of Lords, to safeguard the "longer term interests of the nation rather than just reacting to short term ephemeral issues of the day".

In 1882, the Legislative Council was increased to 24 members by the a special election brought on by the Constitution Act Further Amendment Act 1881, and the Province was then divided into four districts which each elected six members: Central, North-Eastern, Northern and Southern districts. At the same time, the electoral schedule was shifted so that half of the Council was elected at each House of Assembly election.

Women earned the right to vote in the Council at the same time as the Assembly, in 1895, the first Parliament in Australia to do so, under the radical Premier Charles Kingston.

=== Federation ===
In 1902, following the Federation of Australia, the Constitution Act Amendment Act 1901 reduced the size of the legislative council from 24 back to 18 members - 6 from Central District and four each from Northern, North-Eastern and Southern districts. North-Eastern District was replaced by Midland District from the 1910 election, and the restricted franchise was extended to include ministers of religion, school head teachers, postmasters, railway stationmasters, and the officer in charge of a police station.

In 1913, the franchise extended to the inhabitant occupier of a house, but not their spouse. The council expanded to 20 people, four from each of five districts, with the Central district being replaced by Central District No. 1 and Central District No. 2. "Contingency voting", a form of preferential voting, was introduced from 1930.

=== Composition of Council over time ===
The council's numbers varied over time. From inception to 1882, it had 18 members elected by a single colony-wide district. From then until 1902 it had 24 members; until 1915, 18 members; and until 1975, 20 members. The electoral districts were drawn with a heavy bias in favour of rural areas in place, with half of the council being elected each time. From 1915 to 1975, Labor did not gain more than two members at each election, with the conservative parties always holding a sizeable majority. From 1975, the council was increased to 22 members, with half (11) to be elected at each election.

The conservative members in the council were very independent, and differed markedly from their counterparts in the House of Assembly. During the long reign of Liberal and Country League (LCL) Premier Sir Thomas Playford, they would prove to be an irritant, and Labor support was sometimes required for bills to pass. When a Labor government was eventually elected in 1965 and began introducing social legislation that was anathema to LCL councillors, they would delay, obstruct and modify such bills. The councillors saw their actions, in the words of MLC Sir Arthur Rymill, necessary to "oppose... radical moves that I feel would not be in the permanent will of the people." The House of Assembly contained some progressive Liberals, and its membership would usually abide by the party line. The council contained none, and its members rebelled regularly against the decisions of the party leadership and the popular will of the people.

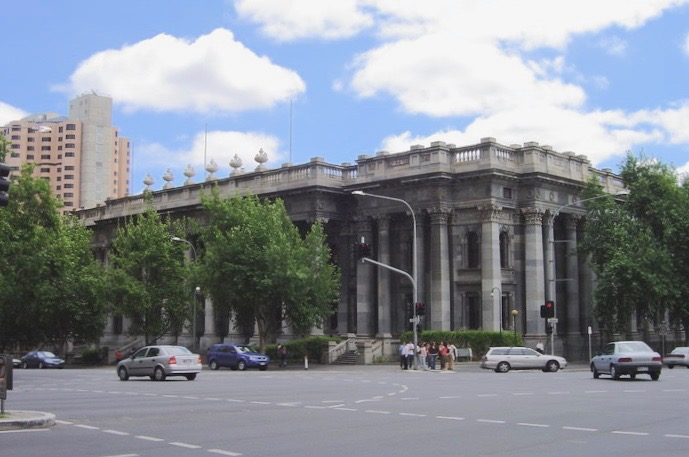
Parliament House on North Terrace, Adelaide.

=== Universal suffrage ===
Even after electoral legislation had been implemented in 1967 by Steele Hall that produced a fairer electoral system for the House of Assembly, the council remained a house of property.

Under the original 1856 Constitution, the franchise was restricted to men, "having a freehold estate in possession, either legal or equitable, situate within the said Province, of the clear value of Fifty Pounds sterling money above all charges and encumbrances affecting the same, or having a leasehold estate in possession, situate within the said Province, the lease thereof having been registered in the General Registry Office, for the registration of deeds, and having three years to run at the time of voting, or containing a clause authorising the lessee to become the purchaser of the land thereby demised, or occupy a dwelling house of the clear annual value of Twenty-five Pounds sterling money."

In 1907, the right to vote was extended to any person occupying a dwelling house, or "dwelling house and premises appurtenant thereto", with an annual rent of at least 17 pounds per annum (excluding any payment of rent by a wife to her husband); to a registered proprietor of a leasehold on which there were improvements to the value of at least 50 pounds and which were the property of the proprietor. At the same time, the franchise was also extended to ministers of religion, school head teachers, postmasters, railway stationmasters, and the officer in charge of a police station.

In 1913, a further extension of the franchise was granted, when the qualification of an occupier of a dwelling house was altered to include any inhabitant occupier, whether owner or tenant.

In 1918, the right to vote for members of the upper house was extended to all those who had served in armed forced in the First World War. This was subsequently extended to Second World War veterans in 1940 and in 1969, it was simplified to apply to all Australian war veterans regardless of the war they served in.

In 1969, the franchise was granted to any person who owned or rented property, regardless of the value of the property. The franchise was extended to the wedded spouse of the owner or renter.

Major changes came in 1973 under Don Dunstan. Dunstan, a social reformist, tired of the council's obstructionist attitude, and put forward bills for its reform. These changes removed the council's rural bias and all restrictions on suffrage, other than the age of majority, though this was lowered from 21 to 18 years. Initially rejected by the council, the reform created a single statewide electorate of 22 members, with 11 being elected each general election. It eventually passed with bipartisan support.

The new council was designed to be deadlocked, and for a party majority to be hard to gain. Its proportional electoral system proved favourable to minor parties and they have usually held the balance of power. The Liberal Movement, in 1975, was the first minor party to have members elected to the council. Its successor, the Australian Democrats, held the balance until 1997 when No Pokies Nick Xenophon was elected. The Family First Party and the Greens gained representation in 2002 and 2006 respectively.

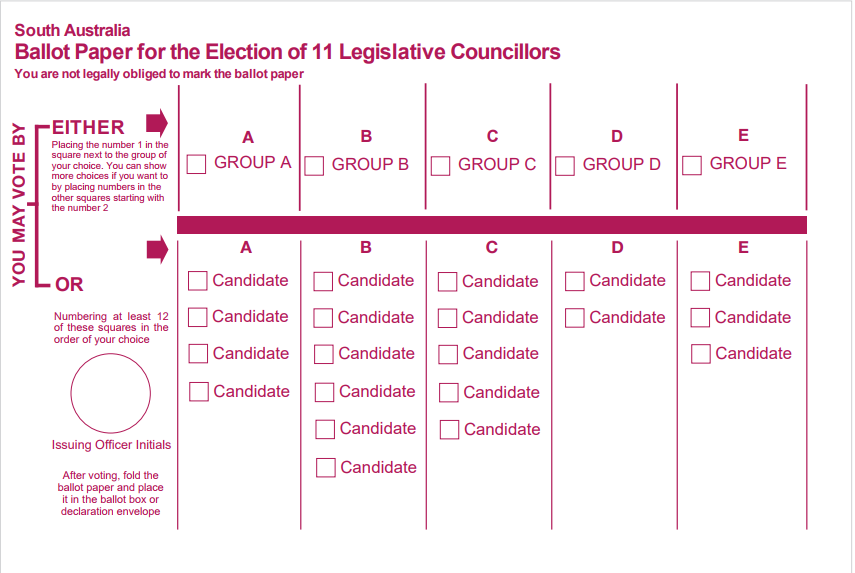
A South Australian Legislative Council ballot paper

The proportional system used in 1973 was party-list proportional representation. This was modified in 1985. The federal government of Bob Hawke had introduced a new single transferable vote system for the Australian Senate, enabling voters to choose between voting 'above the line' (for a single party preference ticket that ranked all candidates on the ballot paper in the party's preferred order) or 'below the line' and number all candidates in order of preference, on the ballot paper. The Bannon state government copied this arrangement for the council.

Following the similar Senate changes which took effect from the 2016 federal election, as of the 2018 state election, South Australia's single transferable vote in the proportionally represented upper house was changed from group voting tickets to optional preferential voting. Instructions for above the line votes are to mark '1'. Further preferences are optional as opposed to preference flows from simply '1' above the line being determined by group voting tickets. Instructions for voters who instead opt to vote below the line are to provide at least 12 preferences, as opposed to having to number all candidates, and with a savings provision to admit ballot papers which indicate at least 6 below the line preferences.

== Membership ==
| Year | 1856 | 1881 | 1901 | 1913 | 1973 |
|---|---|---|---|---|---|
| Districts | 1 | 4 | | 5 | 1 |
| Members | 18 | 24 | 18 | 20 | 22 |

== Distribution of seats ==
Below is the history of the composition of the Legislative Council since the introduction of Proportional Representation at the 1975 election.

=== Current ===
| Party | Seats held | Current Council |
|---|---|---|
| South Australian Labor Party | 10 | |
| South Australian Liberal Party | 6 | |
| One Nation | 3 | |
| South Australian Greens | 2 | |
| Family First | 1 | |

Members of the South Australian Legislative Council, 2026–2030
| Labor (10) | Liberal (6) | One Nation (3) | Greens SA (2) | Family First (1) |
|---|---|---|---|---|
| elected 2026: Emily Bourke; Mira El Dannawi; Justin Hanson; Hilton Gumbys; Clare Scriven | elected 2026: Heidi Girolamo; Ben Hood | elected 2026: Cory Bernardi; Carlos Quaremba; Rebecca Hewett | elected 2026: Melanie Selwood |
| elected 2022: Ian Hunter; Kyam Maher; Reggie Martin; Tung Ngo; Russell Wortley | elected 2022: Nicola Centofanti; Laura Curran; Dennis Hood; Michelle Lensink | | elected 2022: Robert Simms | elected 2022: Sarah Game ^ |

^ Sarah Game originally elected for One Nation in 2022 switched parties from Fair Go to Family First in June 2026

=== 2022–2026 ===
| Party | Seats held | Current Council |
|---|---|---|
| Australian Labor Party | 9 | |
| Liberal Party of Australia | 8 | |
| Greens | 1 | |
| SA Best | 1 | |
| Independents (*) | 3 | |

(*) Independents MLCs: Tammy Franks (Greens until 2025), Sarah Game (One Nation until 2025), and Jing Lee (Liberal until 2025).

At the 2022 election, the eleven seats up for election (the other eleven members had continuing terms) had been held by four Liberal, four Labor, and one each of Greens, Advance SA and an independent. The result elected five Labor, four Liberal, and one each of Greens and One Nation. Consequently the new Labor government would require an additional three non-government votes to pass legislation. However, the Liberal upper house President was unexpectedly re-elected to the Presidency, which would give the Labor government nine of 21 seats during votes on the floor, meaning that only an additional two non-government votes are required to pass legislation.

On 13 May 2025, Tammy Franks resigned from the South Australian Greens and reiterated that she would not contest the 2026 South Australian state election. In her resignation statement, she cited tensions within the party.

Members of the South Australian Legislative Council, 2022–2026
| Labor (9) | Liberal (8) | SA-BEST (2) | Greens SA (2) | One Nation (1) |
|---|---|---|---|---|
| elected 2022: Ian Hunter; Kyam Maher; Reggie Martin; Tung Ngo; Russell Wortley | elected 2022: Nicola Centofanti; Laura Curran; Dennis Hood; Michelle Lensink | | elected 2022: Robert Simms | elected 2022: Sarah Game |
| elected 2018: Emily Bourke; Justin Hanson; Mira El Dannawi ^^ Appointed to replace retiring Irene Pnevmatikos in Oct 2023; Clare Scriven | elected 2018: Heidi Girolamo ^^ Appointed to replace retiring David Ridgway in Aug 2021; Ben Hood ^^ Appointed to replace retiring Stephen Wade in Feb 2023; Terry Stephens; Jing Lee^^ Resigned from the Liberal Party on 10 Jan 2025 | elected 2018: Connie Bonaros; Frank Pangallo ^^ Resigned from SA Best on 30 Nov 2023 | elected 2018: Tammy Franks ^^ Resigned from Greens on 13 May 2025 |

=== 2018–2022 ===
| Party | Seats held | Current Council |
|---|---|---|
| Liberal Party of Australia | 8 | |
| Australian Labor Party | 8 | |
| SA-BEST | 2 | |
| Greens | 2 | |
| Advance SA | 1 | |
| Independents (*) | 1 | |

(*) John Dawkins was expelled from the Liberal Party in 2020 after successfully running against the party's nominee for Legislative Council President. This was against the party's rules.

At the 2018 election, the 11 of 22 seats up for election were 4 Liberal, 4 Labor, 1 Green, 1 Conservative and 1 Dignity. The final outcome was 4 Liberal, 4 Labor, 2 SA Best and 1 Green. Conservative MLC Dennis Hood, who had been elected as a Family First MLC in 2014, defected to the Liberals nine days after the 2018 state election. John Dawkins was expelled from the Liberal Party in 2020 after successfully running against the party's nominee for Legislative Council President. This was against the party's rules.

The 22 seat upper house composition is therefore 8 Liberal on the government benches, 8 Labor on the opposition benches, and 5 to minor parties and 1 independent on the crossbench, consisting of 2 SA Best, 2 Green, 1 Advance SA and John Dawkins. The government would therefore require at least four additional non-government members to form a majority and carry votes on the floor.

Members of the South Australian Legislative Council, 2018–2022
| Liberal (8) | Labor (8) | SA-BEST (2) | Greens SA (2) | Advance SA (1) | Independent (1) |
|---|---|---|---|---|---|
| elected 2018: David Ridgway; Stephen Wade; Terry Stephens; Jing Lee Heidi Girolamo ^^ Appointed to replace retiring David Ridgway in Aug 2021 | elected 2018: Emily Bourke; Justin Hanson; Irene Pnevmatikos; Clare Scriven | elected 2018: Connie Bonaros; Frank Pangallo | elected 2018: Tammy Franks |
| elected 2014: Rob Lucas; Michelle Lensink; Nicola Centofanti ^^ Appointed to replace resigning Andrew McLachlan in 2020; Dennis Hood ^^ defected from AC/FFP after 2018 election | elected 2014: Russell Wortley; Ian Hunter; Tung Ngo; Kyam Maher | | elected 2014: Robert Simms ^^ Appointed to replace resigning Mark Parnell in 2021 | elected 2014: John Darley | elected 2014: John Dawkins ^^ expelled from the Liberal Party in 2020 |

=== 2014–2018 ===
| Party | Seats held | Current Council |
|---|---|---|
| Australian Labor Party | 8 | |
| Liberal Party of Australia | 8 | |
| Greens | 2 | |
| Conservatives^{1} | 2 | |
| Dignity | 1 | |
| Advance SA^{2} | 1 | |

^{1} The two Conservative MPs were elected as members of the Family First Party, which merged into the Australian Conservatives in April 2017.
^{2} One ex-Independent/Nick Xenophon Team MP was created a new state political party named Advance SA in September 2017.

=== 2010–2014 ===
| Party | Seats held | 2010 Council |
|---|---|---|
| Australian Labor Party | 8 | |
| Liberal Party of Australia | 7 | |
| Greens | 2 | |
| Family First Party | 2 | |
| No Pokies | 2 | |
| Dignity | 1 | |

=== 2006–2010 ===
| Party | 2006 | 2006 Council | 2009 | Council @ 2009 |
|---|---|---|---|---|
| Australian Labor Party | 8 | | 8 | |
| Liberal Party of Australia | 8 | | 8 | |
| Family First Party | 2 | | 2 | |
| No Pokies | 2 | | 2 | |
| Greens | 1 | | 1 | |
| Australian Democrats (*) | 1 | | 0 | |
| Independents (*) | 0 | | 1 | |

(*) Sandra Kanck was re-elected for a second eight-year term as a Democrat in 2002. In 2009, David Winderlich replaced Kanck due to her resignation. Later in 2009 Winderlich resigned from the Democrats to sit in parliament as an independent.

=== 2002–2006 ===
| Party | Seats held | 2002–2006 Council |
|---|---|---|
| Liberal Party of Australia | 9 | |
| Australian Labor Party | 7 | |
| Australian Democrats | 3 | |
| Family First Party | 1 | |
| No Pokies | 1 | |
| Independents (*) | 1 | |

(*) Terry Cameron had been elected as a Labor member, but had resigned from the party, initially sitting as an independent, and then founding the SA First party in 1999. He did not face re-election in 2002, but the party disbanded soon after the election, and Cameron subsequently returned to being an independent MLC.

=== 1997–2002 ===
| Party | Seats held | 1997–2002 Council |
|---|---|---|
| Liberal Party of Australia | 10 | |
| Australian Labor Party | 8 | |
| Australian Democrats | 3 | |
| No Pokies | 1 | |

=== 1993–1997 ===
| Party | Seats held | 1993–1997 Council |
|---|---|---|
| Liberal Party of Australia | 11 | |
| Australian Labor Party | 9 | |
| Australian Democrats | 2 | |

=== 1989–1993 ===
| Party | Seats held | 1989–1993 Council |
|---|---|---|
| Australian Labor Party | 10 | |
| Liberal Party of Australia | 10 | |
| Australian Democrats | 2 | |

=== 1985–1989 ===
| Party | Seats held | 1985–1989 Council |
|---|---|---|
| Australian Labor Party | 10 | |
| Liberal Party of Australia | 10 | |
| Australian Democrats | 2 | |

=== 1982–1985 ===
| Party | Seats held | 1982–1985 Council |
|---|---|---|
| Liberal Party of Australia | 11 | |
| Australian Labor Party | 9 | |
| Australian Democrats | 2 | |

=== 1979–1982 ===
| Party | Seats held | 1979–1982 Council |
|---|---|---|
| Liberal Party of Australia | 11 | |
| Australian Labor Party | 10 | |
| Australian Democrats | 1 | |

=== 1975–1979 ===
As part of the transitional arrangements associated with the expansion of the Council from 20 members to 22 members, the Council in this period had 21 members.

| Party | Seats held | 1975–1979 Council |
|---|---|---|
| Australian Labor Party | 10 | |
| Liberal Party of Australia | 9 | |
| Liberal Movement | 2 | |

== See also ==
- 2018 South Australian state election
- List of elections in South Australia
- List of South Australian Legislative Council appointments
- List of South Australian Legislative Council by-elections
- Parliaments of the Australian states and territories
- 2008 Parnell–Bressington filibuster
- Lists of Members of the South Australian Legislative Council
