= Laura Henderson (politician) =

Australian politician

The Honourable Laura Henderson MLC

Member of the Legislative Council
- Incumbent
- Assumed office 19 March 2022

Personal details
- Born: 1996 or 1997 (age 28–29)
- Party: Liberal

Laura Henderson (née Curran) is an Australian politician. She has been a Liberal member of the South Australian Legislative Council since the 2022 state election.

Henderson grew up in Saudi Arabia before moving to Adelaide for study. She was the president of the Liberal Women's Council prior to entering parliament.

Prior to being elected to the Legislative Council in 2022, Henderson had been the Liberal candidate for the state lower house seat of Reynell in 2018 and the federal seat of Kingston in 2019. She was studying the final year for a Bachelor of Laws at University of South Australia during the 2018 election campaign.
