= Michelle Lensink =

Australian politician

The Honourable Michelle Lensink MLC
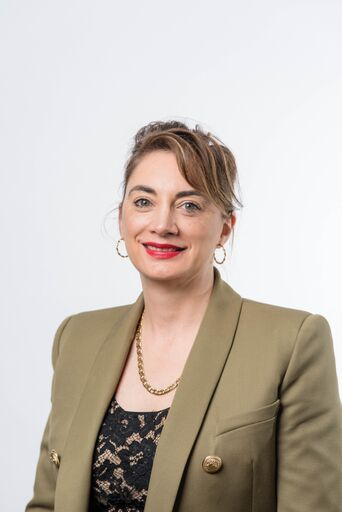

Minister for Human Services
- In office 22 March 2018 – 21 March 2022
- Premier: Steven Marshall
- Preceded by: Zoe Bettison (as Minister for Communities and Social Inclusion, as Minister for Social Housing, as Minister for the Status of Women, as Minister for Ageing, as Minister for Multicultural Affairs, as Minister for Youth, and as Minister for Volunteers)
- Succeeded by: Nat Cook

Member of the Legislative Council
- Incumbent
- Assumed office 26 June 2003

Personal details
- Born: Jacqueline Michelle Ann Lensink; 20 February 1970 (age 56)
- Party: Liberal Party of Australia (SA)
- Education: University of South Australia; University of Adelaide
- Occupation: Physiotherapist

Jacqueline Michelle Ann Lensink (born 20 February 1970) is an Australian politician representing the South Australian Division of the Liberal Party of Australia in the South Australian Legislative Council since 26 June 2003. Lensink served as the Minister for Human Services in the Marshall Ministry between March 2018 and March 2022.

== Background and early career ==
Lensink was educated at Stirling East Primary School and Marryatville High School, before attending the University of South Australia, where she graduated with a Bachelor of Applied Science (Physiotherapy) in 1991. In 2003, she was awarded an MBA from the University of Adelaide. From 1991 to 1994, Lensink worked as a physiotherapist at Repatriation General Hospital, Daw Park, before moving into the political arena.

From 1994 to 1996, she worked as the policy researcher to the federal member for Sturt, who at the time was also parliamentary secretary to the Shadow Minister for Social Security (with responsibility for Child Support policy), and from 1998 to 2002, she worked as ministerial adviser to the Hon. Robert Lawson QC MLC.

From 2002 to 2003, she worked as the executive officer of the Aged Care Association of Australia, SA (formerly ANHECA).

== Political career ==
From 1991 to 1995, Lensink served as a member of the Young Liberal Executive, and in July 1995 she was elected South Australian Young Liberal President where she served for two years. In January 1996, she became the Federal Young Liberal Movement's Treasurer.

In 2001, she was selected at number four on the Liberal Party's Senate ticket for the 2001 federal election; however, did not achieve the necessary quota.

Appointed to the Legislative Council in May 2003 following a casual vacancy caused by the resignation of Diana Laidlaw, Lensink was elected for a further eight-year term at the 2006 election and has subsequently held a number of shadow ministerial positions including shadow responsibility for mental health and substance abuse, security and infrastructure, gambling, government enterprises, consumer affairs, environment and conservation, sustainability and climate change, the status for women, and for youth. She was re-elected for another eight-year term at the 2014 election. She was at third position on the Liberal ticket in both elections.

Since 26 January 2008, Lensink has also served as Deputy Leader of the Liberal Party in the Legislative Council.

In 2024, absent on sick leave due to cancer treatment, she paired with a fellow MLC to successfully vote down an anti-abortion bill (final result 9–10).

Political offices
Preceded by Zoe Bettison as Minister for Communities and Social Inclusion, Minister for Social Housing, Minister for the Status of Women, Minister for Ageing, Minister for Multicultural Affairs, Minister for Youth, and as Minister for Volunteers	Minister for Human Services; 2018–2022	Succeeded by Nat Cook
