= Tim Whetstone =

Australian politician

The Honourable Tim Whetstone MP JP
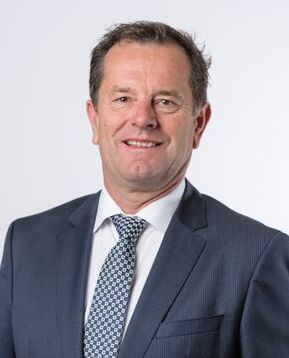
- Whetstone in 2018

Minister for Primary Industries and Regional Development
- In office 22 March 2018 – 26 July 2020
- Premier: Steven Marshall
- Preceded by: Geoff Brock (as Minister for Regional Development); Leon Bignell (as Minister for Agriculture, Food and Fisheries and Minister for Forests)
- Succeeded by: David Basham

Member of the South Australian House of Assembly for Chaffey
- Incumbent
- Assumed office 20 March 2010
- Preceded by: Karlene Maywald

Personal details
- Born: Timothy John Whetstone; 5 March 1960 (age 66) Keith, South Australia
- Party: Liberal
- Occupation: Irrigator

Timothy John Whetstone (born 5 March 1960) is an Australian politician representing the seat of Chaffey in the South Australian House of Assembly for the South Australian Liberal Party since the 2010 election. Whetstone served as the Minister for Primary Industries and Regional Development in the Marshall ministry from 22 March 2018. He resigned from cabinet on 26 July 2020 after a scandal over parliamentary allowances, which he was subsequently cleared of on 15 October 2020.

== Background and early career ==
Whetstone was born in the state's South East at Keith before completing his schooling in Adelaide. He finished a tool maker apprenticeship at General Motors Holden and later went on to develop his own small business building and restoring muscle cars and speedboats.

Whestone was a project manager on the Moomba gas fields before moving to the Riverland in 1989 to purchase a citrus property and develop a vineyard on the River Murray.

In the late 1990s, Whetstone was selected for the national team to represent Australia in the Bridge to Bridge ski race. The team won first place with a speed of 40 minutes.

== Political career ==
Whetstone contested the seat of Chaffey at the 2010 election for the Liberal Party, receiving a 20-point two-candidate swing from incumbent Nationals MP Karlene Maywald, to finish with 53.8 percent of the two-candidate vote. The SA Nationals did not contest the 2014 election, which saw Whetstone win 75.1 percent of the two-party vote.

Between June 2014 until the state election, Whetstone was the Shadow Minister for Trade and Investment, as well as being the Shadow Minister for Recreation, Sport and Racing from 2014 to 2017.

Following the 2018 election, Whetstone was appointed as Minister for Primary Industries and Regional Development.

In July 2020, Whetstone admitted to wrongly claiming travel expenses on 90 occasions over six years, including several claims for accommodation in Adelaide at the same time as he was undertaking international or interstate travel, in what Premier Steven Marshall described as "extraordinarily disappointing" behaviour. As a result, Whetstone resigned from the Marshall ministry on 26 July 2020. Whetstone repaid approximately $7,000 attributed to diary-keeping errors, and on 15 October 2020 was cleared of further investigation. Then-South Australian Independent Commissioner Against Corruption Ann Vanstone explained that "the information provided so far does not reveal evidence of misconduct" and, as a result, had "decided not to widen those inquiries to other Members of Parliament."

Shortly after the 2022 election, which saw the SA Liberal Party returned to opposition, Whetstone was appointed Shadow Minister for Police and Community Safety, Road Safety, Corrections, and Mental Health and Suicide Prevention.

On 6 January 2023, Whetstone resigned as Shadow Minister for Road Safety after accumulating too many demerit points due to unspecified traffic offences, resulting in the loss of his license. Shortly following the incident, then-Leader of the Opposition David Speirs appointed Whetstone as Shadow Minister for Trade and Investment, citing his experience and performance within the shadow ministry.

Following Vincent Tarzia's appointment as Opposition Leader in August 2024, Whetstone was given responsibility over the Industry, Recreation and Racing, and Emergency Services portfolios. He was also later appointed Shadow Minister for Social Services.

South Australian House of Assembly
Preceded by Karlene Maywald	Member for Chaffey; 2010–present	Incumbent
Political offices
Preceded by Geoff Brock as Minister for Regional Development	Minister for Primary Industries and Regional Development; 2018–2020	Succeeded by David Basham
Preceded by Leon Bignell as Minister for Agriculture, Food and Fisheries and Minister for Forests	Minister for Primary Industries and Regional Development; 2018–2020	Succeeded by David Basham
