= Sam Telfer =

Australian politician

Sam Telfer MP

Member of the South Australian House of Assembly for Flinders
- Incumbent
- Assumed office 19 March 2022
- Preceded by: Peter Treloar

Personal details
- Born: 12 September 1985 (age 40) Tumby Bay, South Australia
- Party: Liberal

Samuel Joel Telfer (born 12 September 1985) is an Australian politician. He has been a Liberal member of the South Australian House of Assembly since the 2022 state election, representing Flinders. Before entering parliament, he served as mayor of Tumby Bay District Council and president of the Eyre Peninsula Local Government Association.

South Australian House of Assembly
Preceded by Peter Treloar	Member for Flinders; 2022–present	Incumbent
