= Ben Hood =

Australian politician

The Honourable Ben Hood MLC
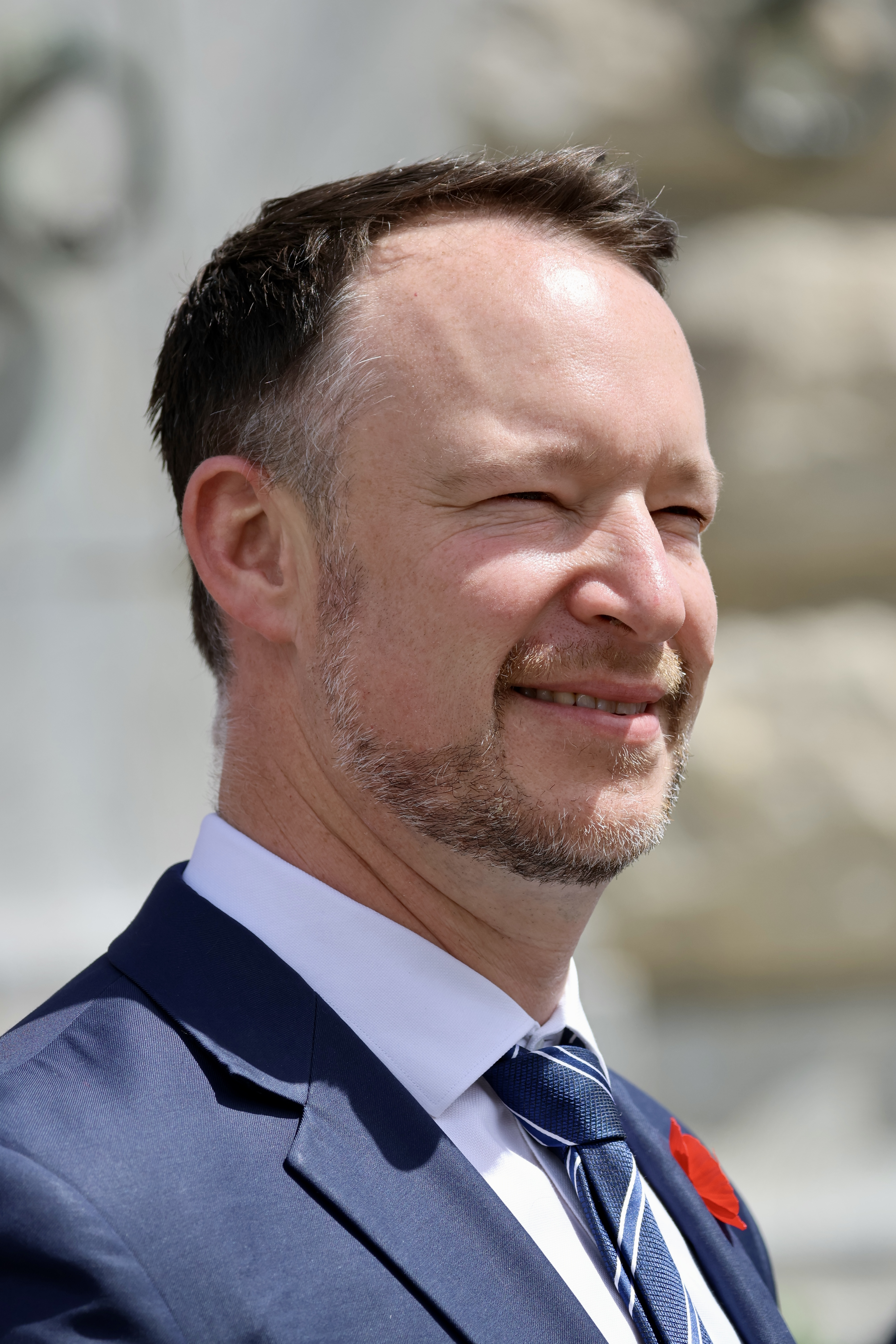
- Hood in 2025

Member of the Legislative Council of South Australia
- Incumbent
- Assumed office 7 March 2023
- Preceded by: Stephen Wade

Deputy mayor of the City of Mount Gambier
- In office 13 December 2022 – 24 February 2023
- Preceded by: Christian Greco
- Succeeded by: Max Bruins

Councillor of the City of Mount Gambier
- In office 9 November 2018 – 24 February 2023
- Succeeded by: Jason Virgo

Personal details
- Born: Benjamin Robin Hood; 10 June 1980 (age 46) Naracoorte, South Australia
- Party: Liberal Party of Australia (SA)
- Spouse: Ellen Hood
- Relations: Lucy Hood (sister)

Benjamin Robin Hood (born 10 June 1980) is an Australian politician who was appointed a member of the South Australian Legislative Council in February 2023, representing the South Australian Division of the Liberal Party of Australia. He replaced retiring member Stephen Wade.

== Early life and career ==
Hood grew up in Naracoorte. He is a director of Hello Friday, a web and branding development agency. He co-created the children's character George the Farmer. A musician and illustrator, Hood wrote and performed all George the Farmer’s music and illustrated and designed all the educational brand’s picture books. In June 2018, he was named one of InDaily's inaugural "40 under 40".

== Political career ==
Hood has served as a councillor and deputy mayor for the City of Mount Gambier and as an inaugural board member of Landscape SA Limestone Coast. He stood as the Liberal candidate for the House of Assembly seat of Mount Gambier in the 2022 election but was unsuccessful against incumbent independent Troy Bell.

Hood was one of two candidates to fill the Liberal vacancy in the Legislative Council after the early retirement of former Health Minister Stephen Wade. Opposition leader David Speirs pushed for a woman to fill the spot, and reportedly told Hood "he did not have his support, would have limited promotion and warned of a strategic blunder" by not continuing to seek a seat in the lower house. Hood is aligned with the Right faction of the party.

In August 2023, Hood was elevated to the Speirs Liberal opposition front bench as Shadow Assistant Minister for Regional South Australia. In August 2024, with the resignation of David Speirs and Vincent Tarzia being elected Leader of the Opposition, Hood was named as Shadow Minister in four portfolios, namely Infrastructure and Transport, Government Accountability, Industrial Relations and Public Sector and Hospitality.

In late 2024, Hood introduced legislation to ban late-term abortions. On 16 October 2024, The South Australian Legislative Council narrowly voted down the bill, 10 to 9.

== Personal life ==
Hood is married to Ellen, and they have three children. He lives in Mount Gambier. His sister Lucy is the Labor member for Adelaide.
