= Josh Teague =

Australian politician

Josh Teague MP
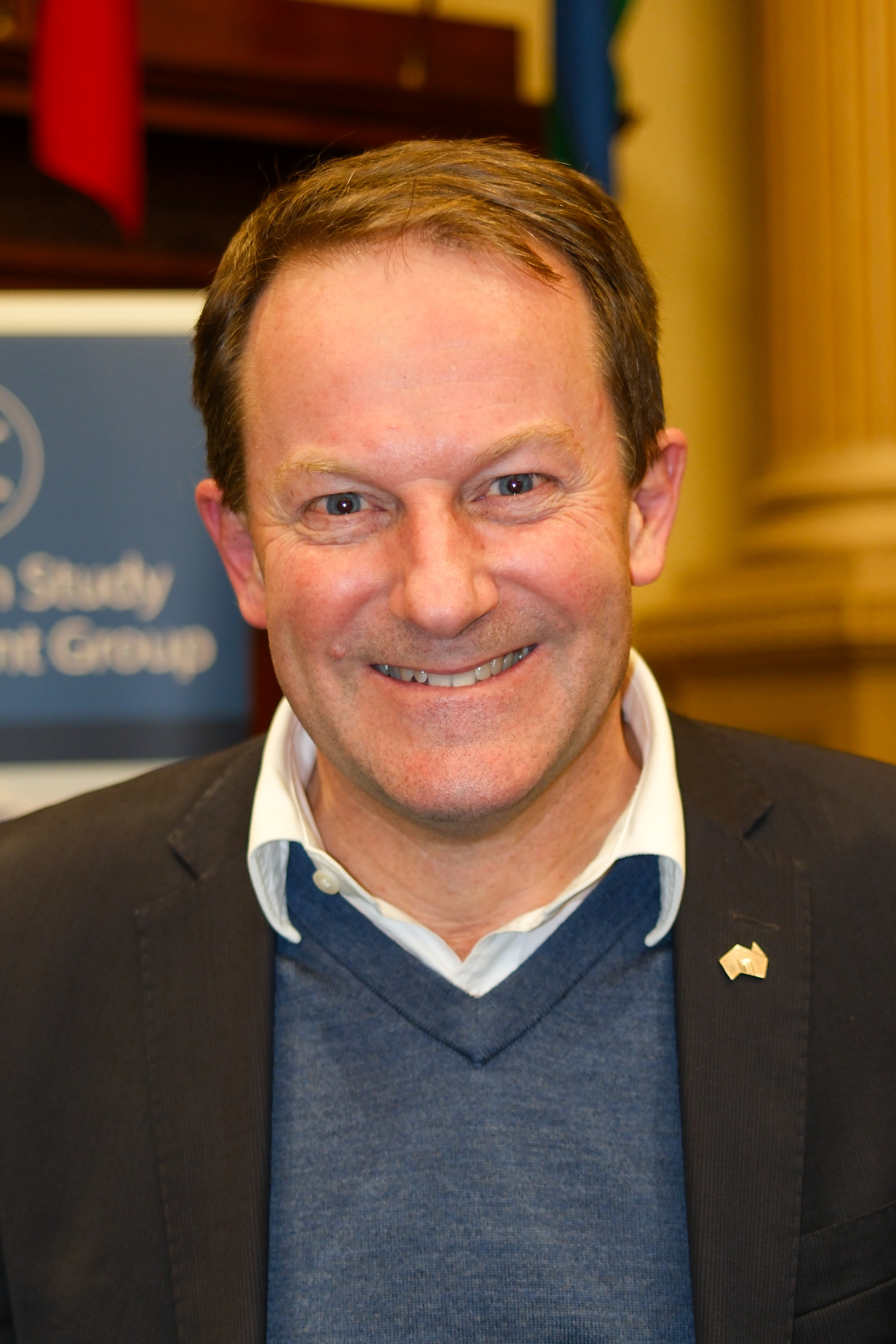
- Teague at Parliament House in 2026

36th Speaker of the South Australian House of Assembly
- In office 8 September 2020 – 12 October 2021
- Preceded by: Vincent Tarzia
- Succeeded by: Dan Cregan

Deputy Leader of the Opposition in South Australia
- Incumbent
- Assumed office 18 December 2024
- Leader: Vincent Tarzia (2024–2025); Ashton Hurn (2025–present)
- Preceded by: John Gardner

Deputy Leader of the South Australian Liberal Party
- Incumbent
- Assumed office 18 December 2024
- Leader: Vincent Tarzia (2024–2025); Ashton Hurn (2025–present)
- Preceded by: John Gardner

Minister for Planning and Local Government
- In office 23 November 2021 – 21 March 2022
- Premier: Steven Marshall
- Preceded by: Vickie Chapman
- Succeeded by: Nick Champion (as Minister for Planning); Geoff Brock (as Minister for Local Government)

Member of the South Australian House of Assembly for Heysen
- Incumbent
- Assumed office 17 March 2018
- Preceded by: Isobel Redmond

Personal details
- Born: Joshua Baden Teague; February 1975 (age 51)
- Party: Liberal
- Relations: Baden Teague (father)
- Occupation: Lawyer
- Josh Teague's voice Teague giving a welcome address Recorded 28 May 2026

Joshua Baden Teague (born February 1975) is an Australian politician. He has been a Liberal member of the South Australian House of Assembly since the 2018 state election, representing Heysen.

On 8 September 2020, he was elected as Speaker of the South Australian House of Assembly. He left the role on 12 October 2021. In November 2021, he was appointed as Minister for Planning and Local Government, with the Attorney-General role intended to be acting only. He held these portfolios until his party lost the election at the 2022 state election. He was elected as Deputy Leader of the South Australian Liberal Party on 18 December 2024 and as a result has served as the Deputy Leader of the Opposition since this time.

Teague, a lawyer, is the son of former senator Baden Teague.

South Australian House of Assembly
Preceded by Isobel Redmond	Member for Heysen; 2018–present	Incumbent
Preceded by Vincent Tarzia	Speaker of the South Australian House of Assembly; 2020–2021	Succeeded by Dan Cregan
Political offices
Preceded by Vickie Chapman	Minister for Planning and Local Government; 2021–2022	Succeeded by Nick Champion as Minister for Planning
Preceded by Vickie Chapman	Minister for Planning and Local Government; 2021–2022	Succeeded by Geoff Brock as Minister for Local Government
Preceded by John Gardner	Deputy Leader of the Opposition in South Australia; 2024–present	Incumbent
Party political offices
Preceded by John Gardner	Deputy Leader of the South Australian Liberal Party; 2024–present	Incumbent
