= Dennis Hood =

Australian politician

The Honourable Dennis Hood MLC
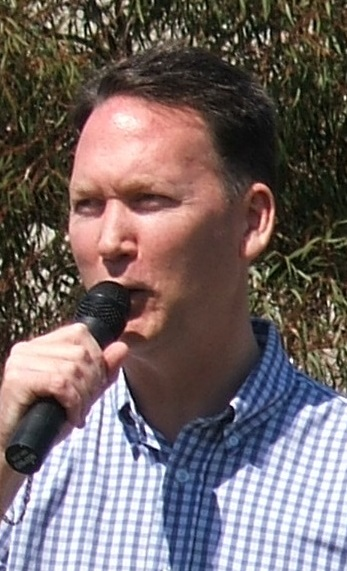

Member of the South Australian Legislative Council
- Incumbent
- Assumed office 1 July 2006

Personal details
- Born: Dennis Garry Edward Hood; 12 January 1970 (age 56) Woodside, South Australia, Australia
- Party: Liberal
- Other political affiliations: Australian Conservatives 2017–18 Family First before 2017
- Spouse: Lisa Hood
- Children: 1
- Education: University of Adelaide
- Profession: Executive; Politician

Dennis Garry Edward Hood (born 12 January 1970) is an Australian politician who has been a member of the South Australian Legislative Council since 2006. He represented the Family First Party from 2006 to 2017, the Australian Conservatives from 2017 to 2018, and has represented the Liberal Party since just after the 2018 state election.

== Early life and personal life ==
Dennis Hood was born in Woodside, South Australia, Australia and raised in Salisbury. In Hood's youth, his father held three jobs and his mother, who is blind, worked as a meat packer. Hood holds a Bachelor of Economics with honours in politics and philosophy and a Bachelor of Arts in Politics from the University of Adelaide. Prior to working in politics, Hood worked in pharmaceuticals as a financial executive for Johnson & Johnson.

Though his parents were not religious, Hood converted to Christianity at 19 and continues to attend church regularly. In 2006, Hood's wife Lisa gave birth to their daughter. He suffers from ankylosing spondylitis.

== Political career ==
Hood became the Federal Director for the Family First Party in 2005. At the 2006 South Australian legislative election he was the lead Family First candidate, and he was elected. In February 2007, he replaced Andrew Evans as the Family First Party's parliamentary leader. At this time, he was also serving as the party's treasurer and was a member of the Social Development Committee.

He was reelected in 2014 on the Family First ticket. In 2016, he was Chair of the Committee of the South Australian Parliament.

Hood and Robert Brokenshire joined the Australian Conservatives when the two parties merged in 2017. At the 2018 state election, where Hood was not up for re-election, the Conservatives performed poorly, and Brokenshire lost his seat, leaving Hood as their only member in the state parliament. Nine days after the election, Hood defected to the Liberal Party. He claimed that the Liberal Party's platform overlapped significantly with his, while the Conservatives were too focused on federal issues and were likely to have "no impact" at the state level.

In April 2020, he served on the South Australian Parliament's COVID-19 Response Committee. Between 2020 and 2022, he was a government whip.

Hood was second on the Liberal Legislative Council ticket at the 2022 state election, and was re-elected.

Hood has previously held the positions of Shadow Cabinet Secretary, Shadow Minister for Sport, Shadow Minister for Training and Skills, and Shadow Minister for Multicultural Affairs.

He is currently the Shadow Minister for Veterans Affairs, Shadow Minister for Tourism, and Shadow Minister for Recreation, Sport and Racing.

== Political stances ==
=== Crime ===
In 2014, Hood argued that the government overregulates people and that, while it has its purposes, it has become too large. In a similar vein, he suggested the removal of compulsory voting in 2009, claiming it undemocratic to force people to cast a vote. In 2008, he unsuccessfully pushed for stricter sentences for criminals' second offences. In 2013, he said that while "rehabilitation is a goal that should always be pursued,... public safety must be the absolute priority" and that punishing criminals should take precedence. In 2011, he introduced a law to increase police's powers to seize the computer of a convicted child molester without a court order for the purpose of examining its contents. The law also allowed judges to restrict pedophiles' internet usage.

In 2017, he supported an anti-bullying bill based on Brodie's Law, which passed in Victoria in 2011. He said that existing anti-bullying approaches were insufficient and needed to be stricter. In 2018, he opposed the continuation of Safe Schools, a policy that reduced bullying of LGBTQ+ students and trained staff on how to deal with sexuality-based abuse. In 2010, he noted that the state coroner needed more resources to address the backlog in cases. The following year he also advocated for the creation of a police task force to address the backlog of unexecuted arrest warrants.

=== Sex and drugs ===
Hood's staunch anti-prostitution beliefs, which in 2011 he said were consistent with his Christian feminist positions, have remained stable throughout the years. In 2015, he believed that decriminalising prostitution would be akin to the government's encouragement and approval to partake in sex work. That same year, despite not supporting decriminalisation, Hood criticised the proposed bill for failing to adequately protect sex workers. In 2019, he again voted against decriminalisation.

In 2007, Hood was also opposed to providing sex ed to primary school children and in 2011 questioned the effectiveness of existing sex ed programs after the prevalence of sexually transmitted infections increased substantially within a year. He called for stricter messaging from schools about safe sex. He has also expressed dislike of sex ed courses that do not teach abstinence before marriage.

In 2008, Hood called for a review of the motion picture classification system, as he did not feel the Advertising Standards Board had properly screened out materials of "poor taste," including a liquor advertisement showing the exposed buttocks of three adult men. He also suggested DVDs of adult films and other restricted content be required to come in plain packaging.

Hood is also highly supportive of increased penalties for drug use. In 2007, he suggested tougher controls on the growing and possession of cannabis. Possession of commercial quantities ($40,000), he pointed out, would only incur a small fine (with a maximum of $500), which was an insufficient disincentive. He also rejected the idea of medical marijuana, saying the harm outweighs the therapeutic benefits. In 2010, he requested on-the-spot fines for users of heroin, methamphetamines, cocaine, and ecstasy. He opposed the use of drugs while driving and in public, saying it is a threat to the welfare of residents, businesses, and the individuals themselves. Apart from increased fines, Hood also suggested pragmatic drug testing devices at hotels and nightclubs. In 2009, Hood proposed laws to adopt this stance by setting minimum, as opposed to maximum, sentences, which are rarely implemented by judges. In 2013, he expressed an interest in dramatically increasing fines for growing marijuana, with maximum penalties for up to five plants increasing from $100 to $2,000 and up to 19 plants from $2,000 to $10,000. He felt that this would be an effective deterrent. In 2014, he encouraged people to seek out the "less harmful" alternatives available rather than use marijuana.

=== Health ===
In 2011, Hood opposed the voluntary euthanasia legislation introduced by Steph Key, claiming it failed to provide sufficient corroborative evidence of the desire for suicide apart from the killer as the sole witness, and that the elderly and dying could be pressured into suicide if they felt that they became a burden on their family. In 2021, he reasserted this belief and suggested improving palliative care instead. He also rejected legislation permitting the cloning of human embryos on the grounds of technology already having the ability to create embryonic stem cells without using human embryos and eggs, thereby making the legislation unnecessary.

=== Family ===
Another of Hood's strong stances is opposition to both same-sex marriage and same-sex parenting. In 2011, he stated that legalising either would take away a child's right to having heterosexual parents. He reaffirmed both of these beliefs again in 2014 and in 2016 proposed an amendment allowing medical professionals to refuse reproductive assistance to same-sex couples and single people. Relatedly, Hood encourages the practice of adoption for heterosexual parents and has criticised abortion rates, particularly when considering low fertility rates. In 2021, he again voted against the decriminalisation of abortion.

In 2024, Hood despite being anti-abortion, was the deciding vote (10–9), that defeated an anti-abortion bill.

In 2008, Hood advocated for mandatory parental consent for children to get a body piercing and worked with John Rau to outlaw scarification for minors. Hood is a supporter of parents doling out non-sexual corporal punishment, namely spanking, to their children. To fight child abuse, he suggested pragmatic checks by agencies other than the Department of Human Services, which had been garnering dissatisfaction from South Australians at the time. In 2011, he submitted a bill that allowed parents more access to and control over their child's Facebook activity.

=== Other ===
In 2007, Hood rejected the scrapping of parliamentary prayer, pointing out that the practice dated back to the Westminster system. He stated that these periods were useful for quiet introspection. In 2009, he rejected the Greens' call to name and shame religious schools that discriminate based on sexual orientation on their web site.

In 2007, Hood called for a ban of nudist beaches, citing his concern that children could be inadvertently exposed. In 2009, he promoted policies permitting the right to remove dangerous, sick and dying trees, and endorsed weekly garbage collection, which the Greens party strongly opposed. In 2011, he established a parliamentary committee to evaluate the environmental, economic, and social impacts of establishing marine parks off the coast of South Australia. He also supported the redevelopment of the Adelaide Oval with some amendments.

Following the 2010 election, Hood worked with other politicians to improve funding for mental healthcare, disability support, child protection, and public housing.

Hood generally subscribes to Keynesian economics.
