= Nicola Centofanti =

Australian politician

The Honourable Nicola Centofanti MLC
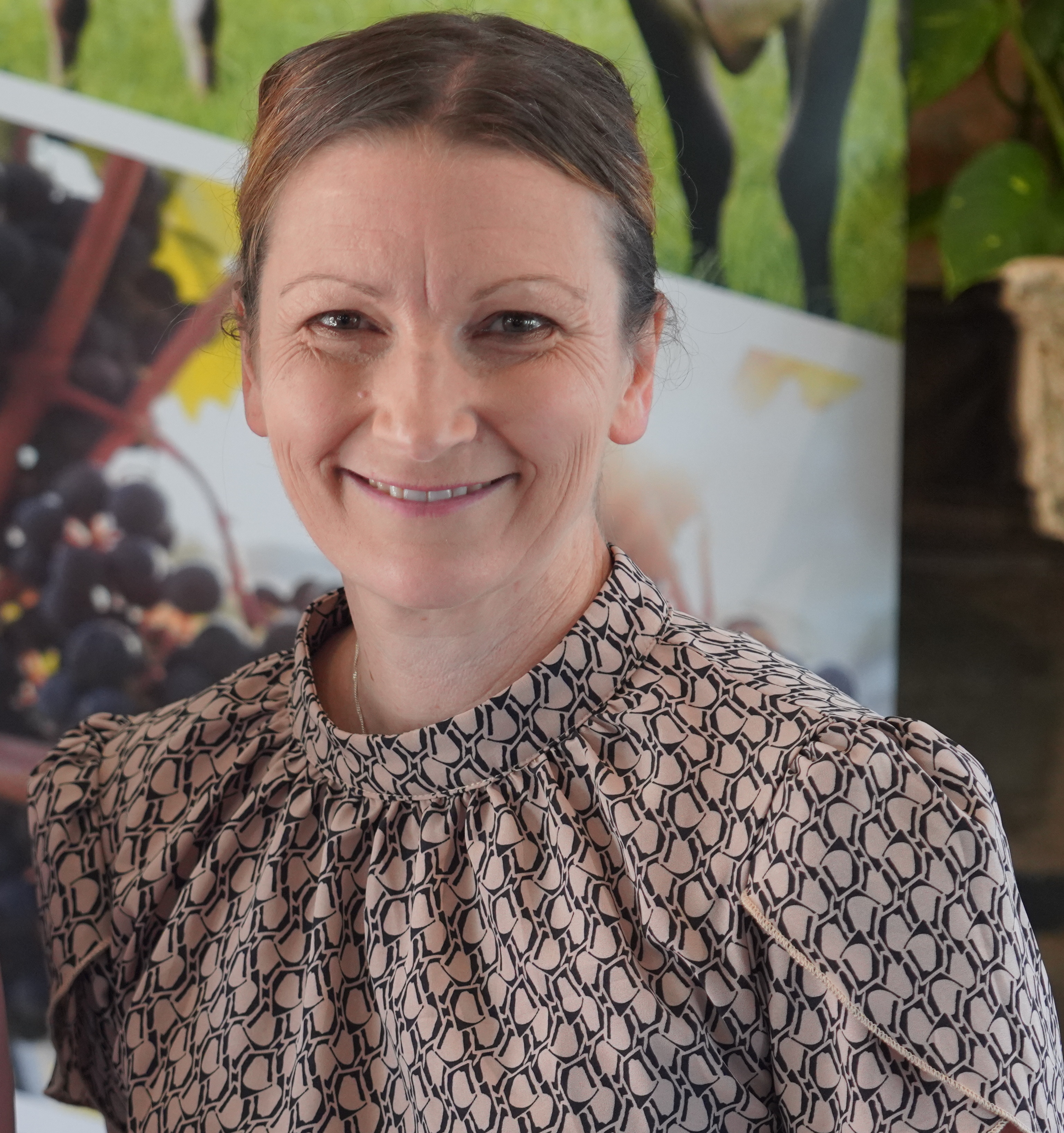
- Centofanti in 2026

Member of the Legislative Council
- Incumbent
- Assumed office 7 April 2020
- Preceded by: Andrew McLachlan

Personal details
- Born: Nicola Jane Andrew
- Party: South Australian Liberal Party
- Relations: Neil Andrew (uncle)
- Profession: Veterinarian

Nicola Jane Centofanti (née Andrew) is an Australian politician. She is Leader of the Opposition in the South Australian Legislative Council, representing the South Australian Liberal Party. After being appointed to a casual vacancy in April 2020, she was was appointed Leader of the Opposition in the LC on 7 April 2022. As of May 2026, she is also Shadow Minister for Environment and Water and Shadow Minister for Primary Industries and Regional Development.

== Early life and education ==
Nicola Jane Andrew was born and grew up in Berri in South Australia's Riverland, the second child of Stuart and Suzanne Andrew. Her father is a lawyer and her mother a teacher.

She attended the local high school in Glossop. As a teenager, she learnt about the Liberal Party through her uncle, Neil Andrew, who was elected MP for Wakefield.

She studied veterinary science at Murdoch University in Western Australia for five years.

== Career ==
=== Veterinary science ===
After graduating from university, Centofanti returned to South Australia and commenced her career at the Riverland Veterinary Clinic.

=== Politics ===
Prior to joining parliament, Centofanti was vice-president of the state division of the Liberal Party.

Centofanti was appointed to a casual vacancy in the South Australian Legislative Council representing the South Australian Division of the Liberal Party of Australia on 7 April 2020. She gave her maiden speech on 2 June.

On 7 April 2022, she was appointed Leader of the Opposition in the LC, as well as Shadow Minister for Regional South Australia, Shadow Minister for Primary Industries, and Shadow Minister for Water Resources & the River Murray. As of May 2026, she is Leader of the Opposition in the Legislative Council, Shadow Minister for Environment and Water, and Shadow Minister for Primary Industries and Regional Development.

In mid-May 2026 Centofanti introduced a bill to repeal the South Australian Voice to Parliament. In response, the Voice issued a statement rejecting the proposal.

On 19 September 2026, Centofanti was defeated in the election for president of the South Australian branch of the Liberal Party, after Alex Antic won 119 votes to her 73.

== Personal life ==
Centofanti is married to David Centofanti and they have three children.
