= Heidi Girolamo =

Australian politician

The Honourable Heidi Girolamo MLC
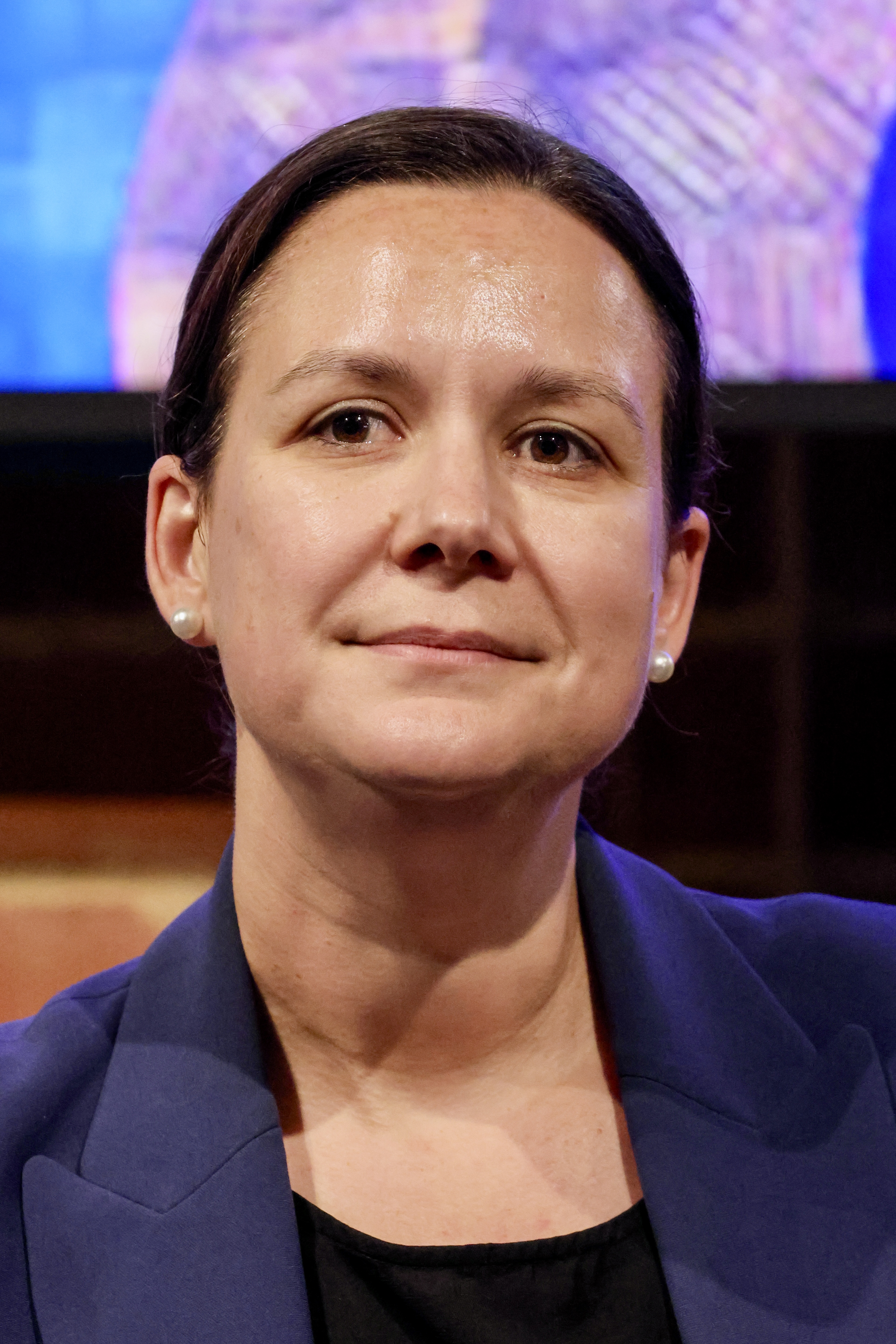
- Girolamo in 2026

Member of the Legislative Council
- Incumbent
- Assumed office 24 August 2021
- Preceded by: David Ridgway

Personal details
- Born: Heidi Margaret Girolamo; 30 December 1983 (age 42) Rose Park, South Australia
- Party: Liberal Party of Australia (SA)
- Profession: Chartered Accountant

Heidi Margaret Girolamo (born 30 December 1983) is an Australian politician. She was appointed to the South Australian Legislative Council representing the Liberal Party on 24 August 2021, to fill a casual vacancy caused by the resignation of David Ridgway. She is Deputy Leader of the Liberal Party in the Legislative Council.

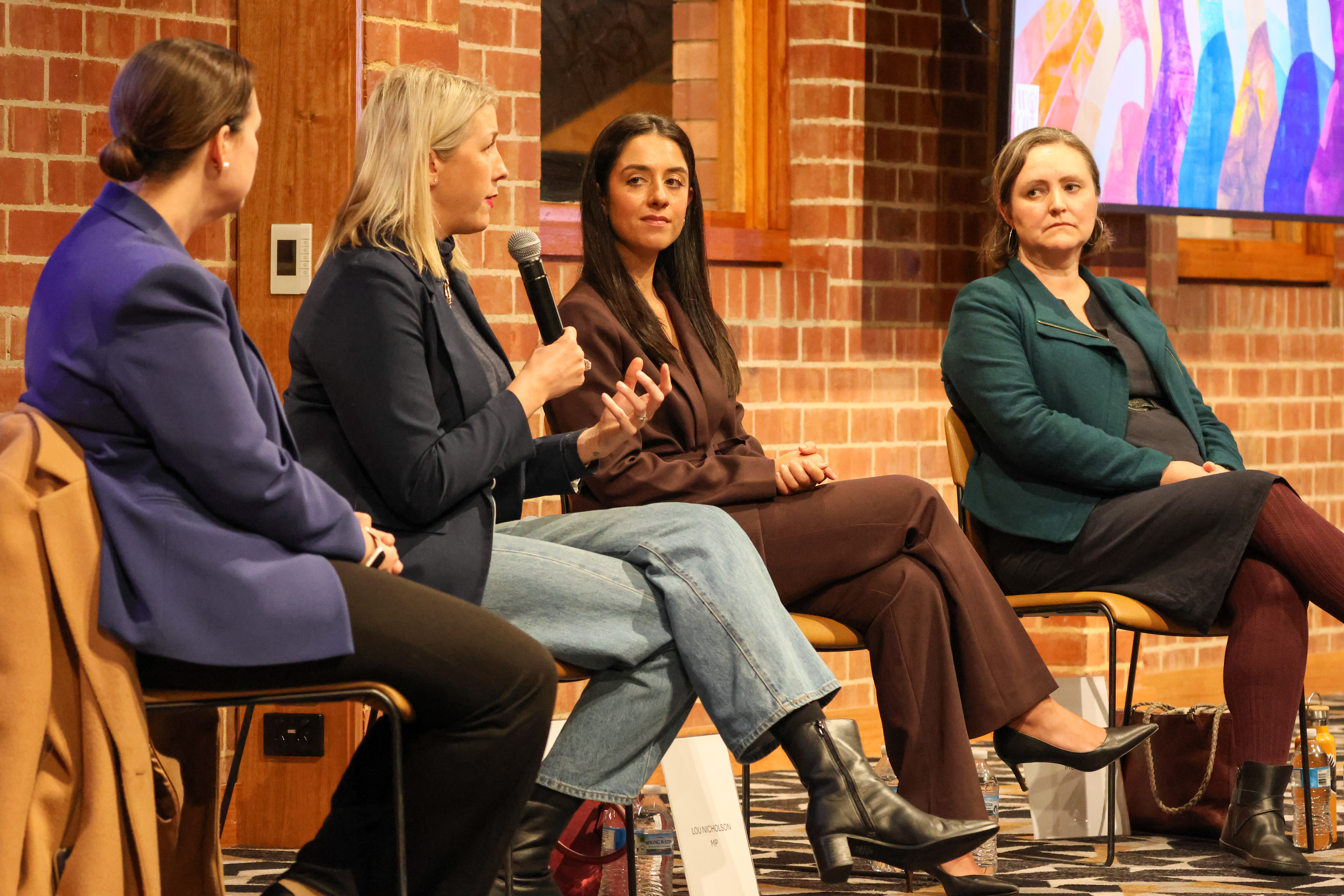
(L–R) Girolamo, Lou Nicholson, Aria Bolkus and Melanie Selwood at Adelaide University in 2026

On 12 December 2025, it was announced that Girolamo would take on the role of Shadow Minister for Health and Wellbeing, which includes mental health and suicide prevention. The portfolio was previously held by Liberal Leader Ashton Hurn MP.

Previously she was the Shadow Minister for Finance, Shadow Minister for Trade and Investment and Shadow Minister for the Circular Economy.

Prior to joining the parliament, Girolamo was a chartered accountant and worked at Deloitte Risk Advisory as a client manager. Girolamo was also Treasurer and Board Member of Kidsafe SA, a charity focused on accident and injury prevention for children, from June 2014 to August 2021. Additionally, she was the Vice President of the Liberal Party of Australia (South Australian Division), and is associated with the Right faction of the South Australian Liberal Party.

Girolamo was born and raised in Adelaide, with family living in regional South Australia. Girolamo also has a keen interest in focusing on early intervention services because of the importance of prevention across health, wellbeing, education and child protection.
