= Results of the 2022 South Australian state election (House of Assembly) =

This is a list of House of Assembly results for the 2022 South Australian state election.

This election was held using instant-runoff voting. Two seats were won by a party which did not receive the most first preference votes: Gibson and Davenport. These were won by Labor, even though the Liberals received more first preference votes, because Labor received more preferences from voters who gave their first preference to other parties.

== Summary ==
Arrangement of the House of Assembly after the 2022 state election.

South Australian state election, 19 March 2022 House of Assembly << 2018–2026 >>
Enrolled voters	1,266,719				
Votes cast	1,127,642		Turnout	89.02	▼ –2.92
Informal votes	36,469		Informal	3.23	▼ –0.87
Summary of votes by party
Party	Primary votes	%	Swing	Seats	Change
Labor	436,134	39.97	▲ +7.18	27	▲ +8
Liberal	389,218	35.67	▼ –2.30	16	▼ –9
Greens	99,534	9.12	▲ +2.46	0	0
Independents	79,144	7.25	▲ +3.75	4	▲ +1
Family First	40,011	3.67	▲ +3.67	0	0
One Nation	28,664	2.63	▲ +2.63	0	0
Animal Justice	6,107	0.56	▲ +0.25	0	0
National	5,279	0.48	▲ +0.48	0	0
Australian Family	3,043	0.28	▲ +0.28	0	0
SA Best	2,171	0.20	▼ –13.95	0	0
Real Change	1,138	0.10	▲ +0.10	0	0
Liberal Democrats	730	0.07	▲ +0.07	0	0
Total	1,091,173			47	
Two-party-preferred
Labor	595,663	54.59	▲ +6.52		
Liberal	495,510	45.41	▼ –6.52		

== Results by electoral district ==
=== Adelaide ===
2022 South Australian state election: Adelaide
Party	Candidate	Votes	%	±%
Labor	Lucy Hood	9,477	40.6	+4.9
Liberal	Rachel Sanderson	9,273	39.8	−7.4
Greens	Sean Cullen-MacAskill	3,146	13.5	+0.8
Australian Family	Robert Walker	545	2.3	+2.3
Animal Justice	Deanna Carbone	502	2.2	+2.2
Real Change	Tom Birdseye	380	1.6	+1.6
Total formal votes		23,323	97.6	
Informal votes		569	2.4	
Turnout		23,892	86.9	
Two-party-preferred result
Labor	Lucy Hood	13,097	56.2	+7.1
Liberal	Rachel Sanderson	10,226	43.8	−7.1
Labor gain from Liberal		Swing	+7.1	

Distribution of preferences: Adelaide
Party	Candidate	Votes	Round 1		Round 2		Round 3		Round 4	
Party	Candidate	Votes	Dist.	Total	Dist.	Total	Dist.	Total	Dist.	Total
Quota (50% + 1)		11,662								
Labor	Lucy Hood	9,477	+48	9,525	+167	9,692	+239	9,931	+3,166	13,097
Liberal	Rachel Sanderson	9,237	+52	9,325	+64	9,389	+289	9,678	+548	10,226
Greens	Sean Cullen-MacAskill	3,146	+70	3,216	+253	3,469	+245	3,714	Excluded	
Australian Family	Robert Walker	545	+106	651	+122	773	Excluded			
Animal Justice	Deanna Carbone	502	+104	606	Excluded					
Real Change	Tom Birdseye	380	Excluded							

=== Badcoe ===
2022 South Australian state election: Badcoe
Party	Candidate	Votes	%	±%
Labor	Jayne Stinson	11,780	50.0	+11.2
Liberal	Jordan Dodd	6,876	29.2	−3.6
Greens	Finn Caulfield	2,697	11.4	+3.9
One Nation	Tristan Iveson	722	3.1	+3.1
Animal Justice	Fiona Eckersley	571	2.4	+2.4
Australian Family	Nicole Hussey	488	2.1	+2.1
Family First	Ken Turner	428	1.8	+1.8
Total formal votes		23,562	96.2	
Informal votes		931	3.8	
Turnout		24,493	89.1	
Two-party-preferred result
Labor	Jayne Stinson	15,263	64.8	+10.1
Liberal	Jordan Dodd	8,299	35.2	−10.1
Labor hold		Swing	+10.1	

Distribution of preferences: Badcoe
Party	Candidate	Votes	Round 1		Round 2		Round 3		Round 4		Round 5	
Party	Candidate	Votes	Dist.	Total	Dist.	Total	Dist.	Total	Dist.	Total	Dist.	Total
Quota (50% + 1)		11,782										
Labor	Jayne Stinson	11,780	+40	11,820	+122	11,942	+260	12,202	+246	12,448	+2,815	15,263
Liberal	Jordan Dodd	6,876	+55	6,931	+71	7,002	+178	7,180	+578	7,758	+541	8,299
Greens	Finn Caulfield	2,697	+38	2,735	+225	2,960	+119	3,079	+277	3,356	Excluded	
One Nation	Tristan Iveson	722	+52	774	+56	830	+271	1,101	Excluded			
Animal Justice	Fiona Eckersley	571	+23	594	Excluded							
Australian Family	Nicole Hussey	488	+220	708	+120	828	Excluded					
Family First	Ken Turner	428	Excluded									

=== Black ===
2022 South Australian state election: Black
Party	Candidate	Votes	%	±%
Liberal	David Speirs	11,862	50.1	−0.9
Labor	Alex Dighton	9,037	38.1	+7.0
Greens	Liz Tidemann	2,785	11.8	+5.2
Total formal votes		23,684	97.4	
Informal votes		643	2.6	
Turnout		24,327	92.0	
Two-party-preferred result
Liberal	David Speirs	12,493	52.7	−6.5
Labor	Alex Dighton	11,191	47.3	+6.5
Liberal hold		Swing	−6.5	

Distribution of preferences: Black
Party	Candidate	Votes	Round 1	
Party	Candidate	Votes	Dist.	Total
Quota (50% + 1)		11,843		
Liberal	David Speirs	11,862	+631	12,493
Labor	Alex Dighton	9,037	+2,154	11,191
Greens	Liz Tidemann	2,785	Excluded	

=== Bragg ===
2022 South Australian state election: Bragg
Party	Candidate	Votes	%	±%
Liberal	Vickie Chapman	12,751	53.8	−7.6
Labor	Rick Sarre	6,793	28.6	+5.7
Greens	Michael Petrilli	3,000	12.6	+4.1
Family First	Daryl McCann	1,175	5.0	+5.0
Total formal votes		23,719	98.2	
Informal votes		438	1.8	
Turnout		24,157	90.4	
Two-party-preferred result
Liberal	Vickie Chapman	13,796	58.2	−8.8
Labor	Rick Sarre	9,923	41.8	+8.8
Liberal hold		Swing	−8.8	

Distribution of preferences: Bragg
Party	Candidate	Votes	Round 1		Round 2	
Party	Candidate	Votes	Dist.	Total	Dist.	Total
Quota (50% + 1)		11,860				
Liberal	Vickie Chapman	12,751	+418	13,169	+627	13,796
Labor	Rick Sarre	6,793	+467	7,260	+2,663	9,923
Greens	Michael Petrilli	3,000	+290	3,290	Excluded	
Family First	Daryl McCann	1,175	Excluded			

=== Chaffey ===
2022 South Australian state election: Chaffey
Party	Candidate	Votes	%	±%
Liberal	Tim Whetstone	12,050	54.6	+7.6
Labor	Joanne Sutton	4,395	19.9	+1.2
One Nation	Sab Feleppa	2,180	9.9	+9.9
Greens	Trevor Schloithe	1,334	6.0	+4.0
National	Damien Buijs	1,267	5.7	+5.7
Family First	Mathew Francis	831	3.8	+3.8
Total formal votes		22,057	95.5	
Informal votes		1,034	4.5	
Turnout		23,091	89.5	
Two-party-preferred result
Liberal	Tim Whetstone	14,820	67.2	−0.8
Labor	Joanne Sutton	7,237	32.8	+0.8
Liberal hold		Swing	−0.8	

Distribution of preferences: Chaffey
Party	Candidate	Votes	Round 1		Round 2		Round 3		Round 4	
Party	Candidate	Votes	Dist.	Total	Dist.	Total	Dist.	Total	Dist.	Total
Quota (50% + 1)		11,029								
Liberal	Tim Whetstone	12,050	+188	12,238	+239	12,477	+837	13,314	+1,506	14,820
Labor	Joanne Sutton	4,395	+159	4,554	+803	5,357	+363	5,720	+1,517	7,237
One Nation	Sab Feleppa	2,180	+142	2,322	+204	2,526	+497	3,023	Excluded	
Greens	Trevor Schloithe	1,334	+114	1,448	Excluded					
National	Damien Buijs	1,267	+228	1,495	+202	1,697	Excluded			
Family First	Mathew Francis	831	Excluded							

=== Cheltenham ===
2022 South Australian state election: Cheltenham
Party	Candidate	Votes	%	±%
Labor	Joe Szakacs	13,027	55.6	+2.4
Liberal	Shane Rix	5,730	24.4	+2.7
Greens	Steffi Medrow	2,545	10.9	+4.6
Family First	Alex Tennikoff	1,513	6.5	+6.5
Independent	Mike Lesiw	633	2.7	+2.7
Total formal votes		23,448	96.4	
Informal votes		888	3.6	
Turnout		24,336	88.1	
Two-party-preferred result
Labor	Joe Szakacs	16,194	69.1	+2.4
Liberal	Shane Rix	7,254	30.9	−2.4
Labor hold		Swing	+2.4	

Distribution of preferences: Cheltenham
Party	Candidate	Votes	Round 1		Round 2		Round 3	
Party	Candidate	Votes	Dist.	Total	Dist.	Total	Dist.	Total
Quota (50% + 1)		11,725						
Labor	Joe Szakacs	13,027	+112	13,139	+450	13,589	+2,605	16,194
Liberal	Shane Rix	5,730	+68	5,798	+849	6,647	+607	7,254
Greens	Steffi Medrow	2,545	+160	2,705	+507	3,212	Excluded	
Family First	Alex Tennikoff	1,513	+293	1,806	Excluded			
Independent	Mike Lesiw	633	Excluded					

=== Colton ===
2022 South Australian state election: Colton
Party	Candidate	Votes	%	±%
Liberal	Matt Cowdrey	13,171	52.3	+6.1
Labor	Paul Alexandrides	9,277	36.8	+3.7
Greens	Deb Cashel	2,759	10.9	+5.6
Total formal votes		25,207	97.5	
Informal votes		657	2.5	
Turnout		25,864	91.1	
Two-party-preferred result
Liberal	Matt Cowdrey	13,816	54.8	−1.4
Labor	Paul Alexandrides	11,391	45.2	+1.4
Liberal hold		Swing	−1.4	

Distribution of preferences: Colton
Party	Candidate	Votes	Round 1	
Party	Candidate	Votes	Dist.	Total
Quota (50% + 1)		12,604		
Liberal	Matt Cowdrey	13,171	+645	13,816
Labor	Paul Alexandrides	9,277	+2,114	11,391
Greens	Deb Cashel	2,759	Excluded	

=== Croydon ===
2022 South Australian state election: Croydon
Party	Candidate	Votes	%	±%
Labor	Peter Malinauskas	14,064	60.8	+4.2
Liberal	Michael Santagata	5,197	22.5	+6.1
Greens	Tracey Davis	2,858	12.3	+4.6
Animal Justice	Millie Hammerstein	1,029	4.4	+1.1
Total formal votes		23,148	96.7	
Informal votes		800	3.3	
Turnout		23,948	85.0	
Two-party-preferred result
Labor	Peter Malinauskas	17,305	74.8	+1.5
Liberal	Michael Santagata	5,843	25.2	−1.5
Labor hold		Swing	+1.5	

Distribution of preferences: Croydon
Party	Candidate	Votes	Round 1		Round 2	
Party	Candidate	Votes	Dist.	Total	Dist.	Total
Quota (50% + 1)		11,575				
Labor	Peter Malinauskas	14,064	+224	14,288	+3,017	17,305
Liberal	Michael Santagata	5,197	+167	5,364	+479	5,843
Greens	Tracey Davis	2,858	+638	3,496	Excluded	
Animal Justice	Millie Hammerstein	1,029	Excluded			

=== Davenport ===
2022 South Australian state election: Davenport
Party	Candidate	Votes	%	±%
Liberal	Steve Murray	9,928	41.2	−1.3
Labor	Erin Thompson	9,835	40.8	+15.4
Greens	John Photakis	2,266	9.4	+2.2
Independent	Dan Golding	2,063	8.6	+2.2
Total formal votes		24,092	97.6	
Informal votes		595	2.4	
Turnout		24,687	92.0	
Two-party-preferred result
Labor	Erin Thompson	12,870	53.4	+11.6
Liberal	Steve Murray	11,222	46.6	−11.6
Labor gain from Liberal		Swing	+11.6	

Distribution of preferences: Davenport
Party	Candidate	Votes	Round 1		Round 2	
Party	Candidate	Votes	Dist.	Total	Dist.	Total
Quota (50% + 1)		12,047				
Liberal	Steve Murray	9,928	+822	10,750	+472	11,222
Labor	Erin Thompson	9,835	+733	10,568	+2,302	12,870
Greens	John Photakis	2,266	+508	2,774	Excluded	
Independent	Dan Golding	2,063	Excluded			

=== Dunstan ===
2022 South Australian state election: Dunstan
Party	Candidate	Votes	%	±%
Liberal	Steven Marshall	11,219	46.7	−2.6
Labor	Cressida O'Hanlon	8,445	35.2	+6.4
Greens	Kay Moncrieff	3,279	13.7	+4.7
Family First	Tony Holloway	1,067	4.4	+4.4
Total formal votes		24,010	98.2	
Informal votes		437	1.8	
Turnout		24,447	89.7	
Two-party-preferred result
Liberal	Steven Marshall	12,135	50.5	−6.9
Labor	Cressida O'Hanlon	11,875	49.5	+6.9
Liberal hold		Swing	−6.9	

Distribution of preferences: Dunstan
Party	Candidate	Votes	Round 1		Round 2	
Party	Candidate	Votes	Dist.	Total	Dist.	Total
Quota (50% + 1)		12,006				
Liberal	Steven Marshall	11,219	+384	11,603	+532	12,135
Labor	Cressida O'Hanlon	8,445	+446	8,891	+2,984	11,875
Greens	Kay Moncrieff	3,279	+237	3,516	Excluded	
Family First	Tony Holloway	1,067	Excluded			

=== Elder ===
2022 South Australian state election: Elder
Party	Candidate	Votes	%	±%
Labor	Nadia Clancy	10,587	43.4	+10.1
Liberal	Carolyn Power	9,289	38.1	−1.3
Greens	Brock Le Cerf	2,402	9.9	+2.3
Liberal Democrats	Joshua Smith	730	3.0	+3.0
Family First	Cathryn Crosby-Wright	619	2.5	+2.5
Animal Justice	Matt Pastro	450	1.8	+1.8
Real Change	Eldert Hoebee	303	1.2	+1.2
Total formal votes		24,380	96.8	
Informal votes		805	3.3	
Turnout		25,185	90.7	
Two-party-preferred result
Labor	Nadia Clancy	13,552	55.6	+7.5
Liberal	Carolyn Power	10,828	44.4	−7.5
Labor gain from Liberal		Swing	+7.5	

Distribution of preferences: Elder
Party	Candidate	Votes	Round 1		Round 2		Round 3		Round 4		Round 5	
Party	Candidate	Votes	Dist.	Total	Dist.	Total	Dist.	Total	Dist.	Total	Dist.	Total
Quota (50% + 1)		12,191										
Labor	Nadia Clancy	10,587	+26	10,613	+111	10,724	+101	10,825	+242	11,067	+2,485	13,552
Liberal	Carolyn Power	9,289	+33	9,322	+51	9,373	+340	9,713	+528	10,241	+587	10,828
Greens	Brock Le Cerf	2,402	+70	2,472	+208	2,680	+168	2,848	+224	3,072	Excluded	
Liberal Democrats	Joshua Smith	730	+51	781	+33	814	+180	994	Excluded			
Family First	Cathryn Crosby-Wright	619	+59	678	+111	789	Excluded					
Animal Justice	Matt Pastro	450	+64	514	Excluded							
Real Change	Eldert Hoebee	303	Excluded									

=== Elizabeth ===
2022 South Australian state election: Elizabeth
Party	Candidate	Votes	%	±%
Labor	Lee Odenwalder	12,086	54.7	+4.0
Liberal	Jake Fedczyszyn	4,281	19.4	+1.4
One Nation	John Lutman	2,290	10.4	+10.4
Greens	Tracey Smallwood	1,736	7.9	+1.2
Family First	John Bennett	1,705	7.7	+7.7
Total formal votes		22,098	96.2	
Informal votes		884	3.8	
Turnout		22,982	82.9	
Two-party-preferred result
Labor	Lee Odenwalder	15,590	70.5	+3.3
Liberal	Jake Fedczyszyn	6,508	29.5	−3.3
Labor hold		Swing	+3.3	

Distribution of preferences: Elizabeth
Party	Candidate	Votes	Round 1		Round 2		Round 3	
Party	Candidate	Votes	Dist.	Total	Dist.	Total	Dist.	Total
Quota (50% + 1)		11,050						
Labor	Lee Odenwalder	12,086	+338	12,424	+1,265	13,689	+1,901	15,590
Liberal	Jake Fedczyszyn	4,281	+521	4,802	+397	5,199	+1,309	6,508
One Nation	John Lutman	2,290	+448	2,738	+472	3,210	Excluded	
Greens	Tracey Smallwood	1,736	+398	2,134	Excluded			
Family First	John Bennett	1,705	Excluded					

=== Enfield ===
2022 South Australian state election: Enfield
Party	Candidate	Votes	%	±%
Labor	Andrea Michaels	12,145	52.3	+13.6
Liberal	Saru Rana	6,768	29.2	+1.3
Greens	Busby Cavanagh	2,310	10.0	+2.4
One Nation	Rajan Vaid	1,041	4.5	+4.5
Family First	Martin Petho	938	4.0	+4.0
Total formal votes		23,202	96.7	
Informal votes		793	3.3	
Turnout		23,995	88.1	
Two-party-preferred result
Labor	Andrea Michaels	14,972	64.5	+8.3
Liberal	Saru Rana	8,230	35.5	−8.3
Labor hold		Swing	+8.3	

Distribution of preferences: Enfield
Party	Candidate	Votes	Round 1		Round 2		Round 3	
Party	Candidate	Votes	Dist.	Total	Dist.	Total	Dist.	Total
Quota (50% + 1)		11,602						
Labor	Andrea Michaels	12,145	+328	12,473	+314	12,787	+2,185	14,972
Liberal	Saru Rana	6,768	+210	6,978	+573	7,551	+679	8,230
Greens	Busby Cavanagh	2,310	+200	2,510	+354	2,864	Excluded	
One Nation	Rajan Vaid	1,041	+200	1,241	Excluded			
Family First	Martin Petho	938	Excluded					

=== Finniss ===
2022 South Australian state election: Finniss
Party	Candidate	Votes	%	±%
Liberal	David Basham	10,424	43.1	−0.4
Labor	Amy Hueppauff	5,532	22.9	+6.1
Independent	Lou Nicholson	4,728	19.6	+19.6
Greens	Anne Bourne	1,647	6.8	−0.9
One Nation	Carlos Quaremba	1,146	4.7	+4.7
Family First	Dominic Carli	614	2.5	+2.5
National	Joe Ienco	82	0.3	+0.3
Total formal votes		24,173	96.9	
Informal votes		778	3.1	
Turnout		24,951	92.1	
Notional two-party-preferred count
Liberal	David Basham	13,715	56.7	−12.0
Labor	Amy Hueppauff	10,458	43.3	+12.0
Two-candidate-preferred result
Liberal	David Basham	12,258	50.7	−13.7
Independent	Lou Nicholson	11,915	49.3	+49.3
Liberal hold				

Distribution of preferences: Finniss
Party	Candidate	Votes	Round 1		Round 2		Round 3		Round 4		Round 5	
Party	Candidate	Votes	Dist.	Total	Dist.	Total	Dist.	Total	Dist.	Total	Dist.	Total
Quota (50% + 1)		12,087										
Liberal	David Basham	10,424	+23	10,447	+130	10,577	+230	10,807	+164	10,971	+1,287	12,258
Labor	Amy Hueppauff	5,532	+4	5,536	+61	5,597	+128	5,725	+537	6,262	Excluded	
Independent	Lou Nicholson	4,728	+18	4,746	+174	4,920	+918	5,838	+1,102	6,940	+4,975	11,915
Greens	Anne Bourne	1,647	+10	1,657	+52	1,709	+94	1,803	Excluded			
One Nation	Carlos Quaremba	1,146	+17	1,163	+207	1,370	Excluded					
Family First	Dominic Carli	614	+10	624	Excluded							
National	Joe Ienco	82	Excluded									

=== Flinders ===
2022 South Australian state election: Flinders
Party	Candidate	Votes	%	±%
Liberal	Sam Telfer	9,743	46.0	−21.4
Independent	Liz Habermann	5,757	27.2	+27.2
Labor	Sarah Tynan	2,943	13.9	−4.0
Greens	Kathryn Hardwick-Franco	996	4.7	−2.1
National	Lillian Poynter	886	4.2	+4.2
Family First	Tracey Dalton	860	4.1	+4.1
Total formal votes		21,185	96.8	
Informal votes		698	3.2	
Turnout		21,883	87.2	
Notional two-party-preferred count
Liberal	Sam Telfer	14,901	70.3	−5.7
Labor	Sarah Tynan	6,284	29.7	+5.7
Two-candidate-preferred result
Liberal	Sam Telfer	11,224	53.0	−23.1
Independent	Liz Habermann	9,961	47.0	+47.0
Liberal hold				

Distribution of preferences: Flinders
Party	Candidate	Votes	Round 1		Round 2		Round 3		Round 4	
Party	Candidate	Votes	Dist.	Total	Dist.	Total	Dist.	Total	Dist.	Total
Quota (50% + 1)		10,593								
Liberal	Sam Telfer	9,743	+157	9,900	+117	10,017	+482	10,499	+725	11,224
Independent	Liz Habermann	5,757	+277	6,034	+456	6,490	+573	7,063	+2,898	9,961
Labor	Sarah Tynan	2,943	+76	3,019	+373	3,392	+231	3,623	Excluded	
Greens	Kathryn Hardwick-Franco	996	+77	1,073	Excluded					
National	Lillian Poynter	886	+273	1,159	+127	1,286	Excluded			
Family First	Tracey Dalton	860	Excluded							

=== Florey ===
2022 South Australian state election: Florey
Party	Candidate	Votes	%	±%
Labor	Michael Brown	10,866	48.9	+8.7
Liberal	Janice McShane	6,298	28.4	+7.0
Greens	Felicity Green	2,294	10.3	+4.5
Family First	Daniel Masullo	1,428	6.4	+6.4
Independent	Tessa Kowaliw	1,326	6.0	+6.0
Total formal votes		22,212	95.9	
Informal votes		938	4.1	
Turnout		23,150	87.8	
Two-party-preferred result
Labor	Michael Brown	13,955	62.8	−0.6
Liberal	Janice McShane	8,257	37.2	+0.6
Labor notional hold		Swing	−0.6	

Distribution of preferences: Florey
Party	Candidate	Votes	Round 1		Round 2		Round 3	
Party	Candidate	Votes	Dist.	Total	Dist.	Total	Dist.	Total
Quota (50% + 1)		11,107						
Labor	Michael Brown	10,866	+299	11,165	+647	11,812	+2,143	13,955
Liberal	Janice McShane	6,298	+224	6,522	+615	7,137	+1,120	8,257
Greens	Felicity Green	2,294	+360	2,654	+609	3,263	Excluded	
Family First	Daniel Masullo	1,428	+443	1,871	Excluded			
Independent	Tessa Kowaliw	1,326	Excluded					

=== Frome ===
2022 South Australian state election: Frome
Party	Candidate	Votes	%	±%
Liberal	Penny Pratt	10,573	45.0	−10.1
Labor	Ashton Charvetto	6,002	25.6	+5.5
Independent	Cate Hunter	3,908	16.6	+16.6
One Nation	Caterina Johnston	2,588	11.0	+11.0
National	Loma Silsbury	410	1.7	+1.7
Total formal votes		23,481	96.3	
Informal votes		900	3.7	
Turnout		24,381	90.6	
Two-party-preferred result
Liberal	Penny Pratt	13,645	58.1	−10.0
Labor	Ashton Charvetto	9,836	41.9	+10.0
Liberal notional hold		Swing	−10.0	

Distribution of preferences: Frome
Party	Candidate	Votes	Round 1		Round 2		Round 3	
Party	Candidate	Votes	Dist.	Total	Dist.	Total	Dist.	Total
Quota (50% + 1)		11,741						
Liberal	Penny Pratt	10,573	+135	10,708	+485	11,193	+2,451	13,644
Labor	Ashton Charvetto	6,002	+45	6,047	+532	6,579	+3,258	9,837
Independent	Cate Hunter	3,908	+130	4,038	+1,671	5,709	Excluded	
One Nation	Caterina Johnston	2,588	+100	2,688	Excluded			
National	Loma Silsbury	410	Excluded					

=== Gibson ===
2022 South Australian state election: Gibson
Party	Candidate	Votes	%	±%
Liberal	Corey Wingard	10,431	42.6	−5.4
Labor	Sarah Andrews	9,701	39.6	+14.3
Greens	Diane Atkinson	2,712	11.1	+5.5
Family First	Fiona Leslie	913	3.7	+3.7
Independent	Jaison Midzi	746	3.0	+3.0
Total formal votes		24,503	97.6	
Informal votes		607	2.4	
Turnout		25,110	89.0	
Two-party-preferred result
Labor	Sarah Andrews	12,867	52.5	+12.5
Liberal	Corey Wingard	11,636	47.5	−12.5
Labor gain from Liberal		Swing	+12.5	

Distribution of preferences: Gibson
Party	Candidate	Votes	Round 1		Round 2		Round 3	
Party	Candidate	Votes	Dist.	Total	Dist.	Total	Dist.	Total
Quota (50% + 1)		12,252						
Liberal	Corey Wingard	10,431	+115	10,546	+455	11,001	+635	11,636
Labor	Sarah Andrews	9,701	+133	9,834	+357	10,191	+2,676	12,867
Greens	Diane Atkinson	2,712	+229	2,941	+370	3,311	Excluded	
Family First	Fiona Leslie	913	+269	1,182	Excluded			
Independent	Jaison Midzi	746	Excluded					

=== Giles ===
2022 South Australian state election: Giles
Party	Candidate	Votes	%	±%
Labor	Eddie Hughes	11,285	58.0	+10.1
Liberal	Graham Taylor	3,460	17.8	−2.5
SA Best	Tom Antonio	2,171	11.2	−11.9
One Nation	Barry Drage	1,236	6.4	+6.4
Greens	Jane Mount	753	3.9	−0.2
Family First	John McComb	536	2.8	+2.8
Total formal votes		19,441	96.4	
Informal votes		725	3.6	
Turnout		20,166	80.8	
Two-party-preferred result
Labor	Eddie Hughes	13,798	71.0	+6.1
Liberal	Graham Taylor	5,643	29.0	−6.1
Labor hold		Swing	+6.1	

Distribution of preferences: Giles
Party	Candidate	Votes	Round 1		Round 2		Round 3		Round 4	
Party	Candidate	Votes	Dist.	Total	Dist.	Total	Dist.	Total	Dist.	Total
Quota (50% + 1)		9,721								
Labor	Eddie Hughes	11,285	+88	11,373	+494	11,867	+354	12,221	+1,577	13,798
Liberal	Graham Taylor	3,460	+82	3,542	+75	3,617	+315	3,932	+1,711	5,643
SA Best	Tom Antonio	2,171	+156	2,327	+137	2,464	+824	3,288	Excluded	
One Nation	Barry Drage	1,236	+141	1,377	+116	1,493	Excluded			
Greens	Jane Mount	753	+69	822	Excluded					
Family First	John McComb	536	Excluded							

=== Hammond ===
2022 South Australian state election: Hammond
Party	Candidate	Votes	%	±%
Liberal	Adrian Pederick	9,130	40.5	−9.0
Labor	Belinda Owens	5,244	23.3	+6.2
Independent	Airlie Keen	3,550	15.7	+15.7
One Nation	Tonya Scott	1,548	6.9	+6.9
Greens	Timothy White	1,377	6.1	+0.5
Family First	Cameron Lock	979	4.3	+4.3
National	John Illingworth	720	3.2	+3.2
Total formal votes		22,548	95.8	
Informal votes		985	4.2	
Turnout		23,533	87.8	
Two-party-preferred result
Liberal	Adrian Pederick	12,431	55.1	−11.7
Labor	Belinda Owens	10,117	44.9	+11.7
Liberal hold		Swing	−11.7	

Distribution of preferences: Hammond
Party	Candidate	Votes	Round 1		Round 2		Round 3		Round 4		Round 5	
Party	Candidate	Votes	Dist.	Total	Dist.	Total	Dist.	Total	Dist.	Total	Dist.	Total
Quota (50% + 1)		11,275										
Liberal	Adrian Pederick	9,130	+169	9,299	+388	9,687	+184	9,871	+415	10,286	+2,145	12,431
Labor	Belinda Owens	5,244	+92	5,336	+135	5,471	+525	5,996	+288	6,284	+3,833	10,117
Independent	Airlie Keen	3,550	+279	3,829	+173	4,002	+535	4,537	+1,441	5,978	Excluded	
One Nation	Tonya Scott	1,548	+74	1,622	+210	1,832	+312	2,144	Excluded			
Greens	Timothy White	1,377	+49	1,426	+130	1,556	Excluded					
Family First	Cameron Lock	979	+57	1,036	Excluded							
National	John Illingworth	720	Excluded									

=== Hartley ===
2022 South Australian state election: Hartley
Party	Candidate	Votes	%	±%
Liberal	Vincent Tarzia	11,591	51.0	+9.5
Labor	Trent Ames	8,511	37.4	+10.5
Greens	Baeley Dear	2,627	11.6	+6.3
Total formal votes		22,729	96.9	
Informal votes		717	3.1	
Turnout		23,446	89.6	
Two-party-preferred result
Liberal	Vincent Tarzia	12,179	53.6	−3.0
Labor	Trent Ames	10,550	46.4	+3.0
Liberal hold		Swing	−3.0	

Distribution of preferences: Hartley
Party	Candidate	Votes	Round 1	
Party	Candidate	Votes	Dist.	Total
Quota (50% + 1)		11,365		
Liberal	Vincent Tarzia	11,591	+588	12,179
Labor	Trent Ames	8,511	+2,039	10,550
Greens	Baeley Dear	2,627	Excluded	

=== Heysen ===
2022 South Australian state election: Heysen
Party	Candidate	Votes	%	±%
Liberal	Josh Teague	10,336	43.3	+3.0
Labor	Rowan Voogt	6,410	26.9	+8.0
Greens	Lynton Vonow	4,937	20.7	+8.7
One Nation	Alexander Allwood	1,159	4.9	+4.9
Family First	Belinda Nikitins	1,008	4.2	+4.2
Total formal votes		23,850	98.0	
Informal votes		494	2.0	
Turnout		24,344	93.5	
Two-party-preferred result
Liberal	Josh Teague	12,377	51.9	−5.7
Labor	Rowan Voogt	11,473	48.1	+5.7
Liberal hold		Swing	−5.7	

Distribution of preferences: Heysen
Party	Candidate	Votes	Round 1		Round 2		Round 3	
Party	Candidate	Votes	Dist.	Total	Dist.	Total	Dist.	Total
Quota (50% + 1)		11,926						
Liberal	Josh Teague	10,336	+249	10,585	+663	11,248	+1,129	12,377
Labor	Rowan Voogt	6,410	+121	6,531	+535	7,066	+4,407	11,473
Greens	Lynton Vonow	4,937	+185	5,122	+414	5,536	Excluded	
One Nation	Alexander Allwood	1,159	+453	1,612	Excluded			
Family First	Belinda Nikitins	1,008	Excluded					

=== Hurtle Vale ===
2022 South Australian state election: Hurtle Vale
Party	Candidate	Votes	%	±%
Labor	Nat Cook	12,161	53.8	+7.4
Liberal	Nick Robins	6,021	26.6	−4.7
Greens	Joseph Johns	1,850	8.2	+1.2
Family First	David John Sires	1,022	4.5	+4.5
Independent	Rob De Jonge	915	4.0	+4.0
Australian Family	Lionel Zschech	641	2.8	+2.8
Total formal votes		22,610	95.7	
Informal votes		1,019	4.3	
Turnout		23,629	89.1	
Two-party-preferred result
Labor	Nat Cook	14,813	65.5	+7.2
Liberal	Nick Robins	7,797	34.5	−7.2
Labor hold		Swing	+7.2	

Distribution of preferences: Hurtle Vale
Party	Candidate	Votes	Round 1		Round 2		Round 3		Round 4	
Party	Candidate	Votes	Dist.	Total	Dist.	Total	Dist.	Total	Dist.	Total
Quota (50% + 1)		11,306								
Labor	Nat Cook	12,161	+42	12,203	+186	12,389	+354	12,743	+2,070	14,813
Liberal	Nick Robins	6,021	+29	6,050	+290	6,340	+853	7,193	+604	7,797
Greens	Joseph Johns	1,850	+67	1,917	+136	2,053	+621	2,674	Excluded	
Family First	David John Sires	1,022	+394	1,416	+412	1,828	Excluded			
Independent	Rob De Jonge	915	+109	1,024	Excluded					
Australian Family	Lionel Zschech	641	Excluded							

=== Kaurna ===
2022 South Australian state election: Kaurna
Party	Candidate	Votes	%	±%
Labor	Chris Picton	13,696	56.0	+0.4
Liberal	Sarika Sharma	5,053	20.7	−7.4
Greens	Sean Weatherly	2,649	10.8	+1.7
One Nation	Peter Heggie	2,000	8.2	+8.2
Family First	Steven Price	1,050	4.3	+4.3
Total formal votes		24,448	96.6	
Informal votes		867	3.4	
Turnout		25,315	87.8	
Two-party-preferred result
Labor	Chris Picton	17,141	70.1	+4.1
Liberal	Sarika Sharma	7,307	29.9	−4.1
Labor hold		Swing	+4.1	

Distribution of preferences: Kaurna
Party	Candidate	Votes	Round 1		Round 2		Round 3	
Party	Candidate	Votes	Dist.	Total	Dist.	Total	Dist.	Total
Quota (50% + 1)		12,225						
Labor	Chris Picton	13,696	+228	13,924	+575	14,499	+2,642	17,141
Liberal	Sarika Sharma	5,053	+199	5,252	+1,153	6,405	+902	7,307
Greens	Sean Weatherly	2,649	+223	2,872	+672	3,544	Excluded	
One Nation	Peter Heggie	2,000	+400	2,400	Excluded			
Family First	Steven Price	1,050	Excluded					

=== Kavel ===
2022 South Australian state election: Kavel
Party	Candidate	Votes	%	±%
Independent	Dan Cregan	12,199	50.5	+50.5
Liberal	Rowan Mumford	5,036	20.8	−26.4
Labor	Glen Dallimore	3,458	14.3	−1.7
Greens	Melanie Selwood	1,978	8.2	−1.0
One Nation	Gayle Allwood	894	3.7	+3.7
Animal Justice	Padma Chaplin	599	2.5	−0.3
Total formal votes		24,164	97.5	
Informal votes		625	2.5	
Turnout		24,789	91.3	
Notional two-party-preferred count
Liberal	Rowan Mumford	13,194	54.6	−9.8
Labor	Glen Dallimore	10,970	45.4	+9.8
Two-candidate-preferred result
Independent	Dan Cregan	18,231	75.4	+75.4
Liberal	Rowan Mumford	5,933	24.6	−39.9
Independent hold				

Distribution of preferences: Kavel
Party	Candidate	Votes	Round 1		Round 2		Round 3		Round 4	
Party	Candidate	Votes	Dist.	Total	Dist.	Total	Dist.	Total	Dist.	Total
Quota (50% + 1)		12,083								
Independent	Dan Cregan	12,199	+103	12,302	+662	12,964	+968	13,932	+4,299	18,231
Liberal	Rowan Mumford	5,036	+30	5,066	+138	5,204	+137	5,341	+592	5,933
Labor	Glen Dallimore	3,458	+67	3,525	+67	3,592	+1,299	4,891	Excluded	
Greens	Melanie Selwood	1,978	+347	2,325	+79	2,404	Excluded			
One Nation	Gayle Allwood	894	+52	946	Excluded					
Animal Justice	Padma Chaplin	599	Excluded							

=== King ===
2022 South Australian state election: King
Party	Candidate	Votes	%	±%
Labor	Rhiannon Pearce	10,366	43.2	+8.9
Liberal	Paula Luethen	9,644	40.2	+3.5
Greens	Kate Randell	1,347	5.6	−0.2
Family First	Alisha Minahan	874	3.6	+3.6
Australian Family	Alex Banks	865	3.6	+3.6
Animal Justice	Frankie Bray	604	2.5	+2.5
Real Change	Jodi Hutchinson	308	1.3	+1.3
Total formal votes		24,008	96.3	
Informal votes		934	3.7	
Turnout		24,942	91.7	
Two-party-preferred result
Labor	Rhiannon Pearce	12,692	52.9	+3.5
Liberal	Paula Luethen	11,316	47.1	−3.5
Labor gain from Liberal		Swing	+3.5	

Distribution of preferences: King
Party	Candidate	Votes	Round 1		Round 2		Round 3		Round 4		Round 5	
Party	Candidate	Votes	Dist.	Total	Dist.	Total	Dist.	Total	Dist.	Total	Dist.	Total
Quota (50% + 1)		12,005										
Labor	Rhiannon Pearce	10,366	+26	10,392	+209	10,601	+73	10,674	+951	11,625	+1,067	12,692
Liberal	Paula Luethen	9,644	+24	9,668	+74	9,742	+125	9,867	+376	10,243	+1,073	11,316
Greens	Kate Randell	1,347	+37	1,384	+212	1,596	+95	1,691	Excluded			
Family First	Alisha Minahan	874	+63	937	+103	1,040	+736	1,776	+364	2,140	Excluded	
Australian Family	Alex Banks	865	+97	962	+67	1,029	Excluded					
Animal Justice	Frankie Bray	604	+61	665	Excluded							
Real Change	Jodi Hutchinson	308	Excluded									

=== Lee ===
2022 South Australian state election: Lee
Party	Candidate	Votes	%	±%
Labor	Stephen Mullighan	11,371	51.3	+7.5
Liberal	Jake Hall-Evans	7,556	34.1	+0.6
Greens	Andrew Payne	1,854	8.4	+4.0
Family First	John Moldovan	1,403	6.3	+6.3
Total formal votes		22,184	97.0	
Informal votes		693	3.0	
Turnout		22,877	88.5	
Two-party-preferred result
Labor	Stephen Mullighan	13,577	61.2	+5.9
Liberal	Jake Hall-Evans	8,607	38.8	−5.9
Labor hold		Swing	+5.9	

Distribution of preferences: Lee
Party	Candidate	Votes	Round 1		Round 2	
Party	Candidate	Votes	Dist.	Total	Dist.	Total
Quota (50% + 1)		11,093				
Labor	Stephen Mullighan	11,371	+415	11,786	+1,791	13,577
Liberal	Jake Hall-Evans	7,556	+555	8,111	+496	8,607
Greens	Andrew Payne	1,854	+433	2,287	Excluded	
Family First	John Moldovan	1,403	Excluded			

=== Light ===
2022 South Australian state election: Light
Party	Candidate	Votes	%	±%
Labor	Tony Piccolo	13,144	57.5	+6.4
Liberal	Andrew Williamson	5,468	23.9	−10.5
One Nation	David Duncan	1,542	6.8	+6.8
Greens	Brett Ferris	1,506	6.6	−0.3
Family First	Benjamin Hackett	1,184	5.2	+5.2
Total formal votes		22,844	97.0	
Informal votes		704	3.0	
Turnout		23,548	88.1	
Two-party-preferred result
Labor	Tony Piccolo	15,873	69.5	+11.1
Liberal	Andrew Williamson	6,971	30.5	−11.1
Labor hold		Swing	+11.1	

Distribution of preferences: Light
Party	Candidate	Votes	Round 1		Round 2		Round 3	
Party	Candidate	Votes	Dist.	Total	Dist.	Total	Dist.	Total
Quota (50% + 1)		11,423						
Labor	Tony Piccolo	13,144	+472	13,616	+1,169	14,785	+1,088	15,873
Liberal	Andrew Williamson	5,468	+183	5,651	+281	5,932	+1,039	6,971
One Nation	David Duncan	1,542	+310	1,852	+275	2,127	Excluded	
Greens	Brett Ferris	1,506	+219	1,725	Excluded			
Family First	Benjamin Hackett	1,184	Excluded					

=== MacKillop ===
2022 South Australian state election: MacKillop
Party	Candidate	Votes	%	±%
Liberal	Nick McBride	14,623	62.3	+6.8
Labor	Mark Braes	4,703	20.0	+10.0
One Nation	Pam Giehr	1,892	8.1	+8.1
Family First	Dayle Baker	1,139	4.9	+4.9
National	Jonathan Pietzsch	1,109	4.7	+4.7
Total formal votes		23,466	96.5	
Informal votes		851	3.5	
Turnout		24,317	89.4	
Two-party-preferred result
Liberal	Nick McBride	17,048	72.6	−2.6
Labor	Mark Braes	6,418	27.4	+2.6
Liberal hold		Swing	−2.6	

Distribution of preferences: MacKillop
Party	Candidate	Votes	Round 1		Round 2		Round 3	
Party	Candidate	Votes	Dist.	Total	Dist.	Total	Dist.	Total
Quota (50% + 1)		11,734						
Liberal	Nick McBride	14,623	+457	15,080	+519	15,599	+1,449	17,048
Labor	Mark Braes	4,703	+102	4,805	+416	5,221	+1,197	6,418
One Nation	Pam Giehr	1,892	+189	2,081	+565	2,646	Excluded	
Family First	Dayle Baker	1,139	+361	1,500	Excluded			
National	Jonathan Pietzsch	1,109	Excluded					

=== Mawson ===
2022 South Australian state election: Mawson
Party	Candidate	Votes	%	±%
Labor	Leon Bignell	12,288	51.2	+15.8
Liberal	Amy Williams	6,724	28.0	−6.6
Greens	Jason Garrood	2,126	8.9	+0.7
One Nation	Jennifer Game	1,574	6.6	+6.6
Animal Justice	Steve Campbell	574	2.4	+2.4
Family First	Lynton Barry	443	1.8	+1.8
Australian Family	Peter Ieraci	279	1.2	+1.2
Total formal votes		24,008	97.0	
Informal votes		745	3.0	
Turnout		24,753	90.0	
Two-party-preferred result
Labor	Leon Bignell	15,322	63.8	+13.1
Liberal	Amy Williams	8,686	36.2	−13.1
Labor hold		Swing	+13.1	

Distribution of preferences: Mawson
Party	Candidate	Votes	Round 1		Round 2		Round 3		Round 4		Round 5	
Party	Candidate	Votes	Dist.	Total	Dist.	Total	Dist.	Total	Dist.	Total	Dist.	Total
Quota (50% + 1)		12,005										
Labor	Leon Bignell	12,288	+19	12,307	+75	12,382	+185	12,567	+410	12,977	+2,345	15,322
Liberal	Amy Williams	6,724	+16	6,740	+119	6,859	+64	6,923	+837	7,760	+926	8,686
Greens	Jason Garrood	2,126	+25	2,151	+70	2,221	+270	2,491	+780	3,271	Excluded	
One Nation	Jennifer Game	1,574	+84	1,658	+202	1,860	+167	2,027	Excluded			
Animal Justice	Steve Campbell	574	+12	586	+100	686	Excluded					
Family First	Lynton Barry	443	+123	566	Excluded							
Australian Family	Peter Ieraci	279	Excluded									

=== Morialta ===
2022 South Australian state election: Morialta
Party	Candidate	Votes	%	±%
Liberal	John Gardner	10,935	46.2	+1.9
Labor	Matthew Marozzi	8,545	36.1	+11.7
Greens	Alex Dinovitser	2,441	10.3	+4.8
Family First	Nick Zollo	1,763	7.4	+7.4
Total formal votes		23,684	96.9	
Informal votes		756	3.1	
Turnout		24,440	91.6	
Two-party-preferred result
Liberal	John Gardner	12,165	51.4	−8.0
Labor	Matthew Marozzi	11,519	48.6	+8.0
Liberal hold		Swing	−8.0	

Distribution of preferences: Morialta
Party	Candidate	Votes	Round 1		Round 2	
Party	Candidate	Votes	Dist.	Total	Dist.	Total
Quota (50% + 1)		11,843				
Liberal	John Gardner	10,935	+695	11,630	+535	12,165
Labor	Matthew Marozzi	8,545	+698	9,243	+2,276	11,519
Greens	Alex Dinovitser	2,441	+370	2,811	Excluded	
Family First	Nick Zollo	1,763	Excluded			

=== Morphett ===
2022 South Australian state election: Morphett
Party	Candidate	Votes	%	±%
Liberal	Stephen Patterson	11,730	51.7	+8.4
Labor	Cameron Hurst	8,086	35.6	+10.0
Greens	Autumn Slavin	2,881	12.7	+7.3
Total formal votes		22,697	97.5	
Informal votes		583	2.5	
Turnout		23,280	88.8	
Two-party-preferred result
Liberal	Stephen Patterson	12,380	54.5	−6.4
Labor	Cameron Hurst	10,317	45.5	+6.4
Liberal hold		Swing	−6.4	

Distribution of preferences: Morphett
Party	Candidate	Votes	Round 1	
Party	Candidate	Votes	Dist.	Total
Quota (50% + 1)		11,349		
Liberal	Stephen Patterson	11,730	+650	12,380
Labor	Cameron Hurst	8,086	+2,231	10,317
Greens	Autumn Slavin	2,881	Excluded	

=== Mount Gambier ===
2022 South Australian state election: Mount Gambier
Party	Candidate	Votes	%	±%
Independent	Troy Bell	10,135	45.7	+7.0
Liberal	Ben Hood	6,433	29.0	+5.0
Labor	Katherine Davies	4,578	20.6	+10.8
Family First	Peter Heaven	1,032	4.7	+4.7
Total formal votes		22,178	97.0	
Informal votes		689	3.0	
Turnout		22,867	89.3	
Notional two-party-preferred count
Liberal	Ben Hood	14,139	63.8	−4.7
Labor	Katherine Davies	8,039	36.2	+4.7
Two-candidate-preferred result
Independent	Troy Bell	14,001	63.1	+2.9
Liberal	Ben Hood	8,177	36.9	−2.9
Independent hold		Swing	+2.9	

Distribution of preferences: Mount Gambier
Party	Candidate	Votes	Round 1		Round 2	
Party	Candidate	Votes	Dist.	Total	Dist.	Total
Quota (50% + 1)		11,090				
Independent	Troy Bell	10,135	+505	10,640	+3,361	14,001
Liberal	Ben Hood	6,433	+284	6,717	+1,460	8,177
Labor	Katherine Davies	4,578	+243	4,821	Excluded	
Family First	Peter Heaven	1,032	Excluded			

=== Narungga ===
2022 South Australian state election: Narungga
Party	Candidate	Votes	%	±%
Independent	Fraser Ellis	7,139	32.5	+32.5
Liberal	Tom Michael	6,327	28.8	−18.4
Labor	Mark Paull	4,427	20.2	+4.1
Independent	Dianah Walter	1,826	8.3	+8.3
One Nation	Kerry White	1,183	5.4	+5.4
Family First	Wendy Leanne Joyce	770	3.5	+3.5
National	Ashley Wright	283	1.3	+1.3
Total formal votes		21,955	95.7	
Informal votes		995	4.3	
Turnout		22,950	91.4	
Notional two-party-preferred count
Liberal	Tom Michael	14,035	63.9	−4.3
Labor	Mark Paull	7,920	36.1	+4.3
Two-candidate-preferred result
Independent	Fraser Ellis	12,808	58.3	+58.3
Liberal	Tom Michael	9,147	41.7	−26.6
Independent hold				

Distribution of preferences: Narungga
Party	Candidate	Votes	Round 1		Round 2		Round 3		Round 4		Round 5	
Party	Candidate	Votes	Dist.	Total	Dist.	Total	Dist.	Total	Dist.	Total	Dist.	Total
Quota (50% + 1)		10,978										
Independent	Fraser Ellis	7,139	+51	7,190	+268	7,458	+502	7,960	+1,135	9,096	+3,713	12,808
Liberal	Tom Michael	6,327	+120	6,447	+85	6,532	+165	6,697	+524	7,221	+1,926	9,147
Labor	Mark Paull	4,427	+19	4,446	+124	4,570	+200	4,770	+869	5,639	Excluded	
Independent	Dianah Walter	1,826	+46	1,872	+112	1,984	+544	2,528	Excluded			
One Nation	Kerry White	1,183	+30	1,213	+198	1,411	Excluded					
Family First	Wendy Leanne Joyce	770	+17	787	Excluded							
National	Ashley Wright	283	Excluded									

=== Newland ===
2022 South Australian state election: Newland
Party	Candidate	Votes	%	±%
Labor	Olivia Savvas	8,599	36.9	+3.7
Liberal	Richard Harvey	8,076	34.6	+0.5
Independent	Frances Bedford	2,861	12.3	+6.8
Greens	Adla Mattiske	1,344	5.8	+0.2
One Nation	Hayley Marley-Duncan	885	3.8	+3.8
Family First	Brett Green	844	3.6	+3.6
Animal Justice	David Sherlock	351	1.5	+1.0
Australian Family	Dan Casey	225	1.0	+1.0
Real Change	Kate Simpson	147	0.6	+0.6
Total formal votes		23,332	95.6	
Informal votes		1,076	4.4	
Turnout		24,408	90.9	
Two-party-preferred result
Labor	Olivia Savvas	12,916	55.4	+5.4
Liberal	Richard Harvey	10,416	44.6	−5.4
Labor gain from Liberal		Swing	+5.4	

Distribution of preferences: Newland
Party	Candidate	Votes	Round 1		Round 2		Round 3		Round 4		Round 5		Round 6		Round 7	
Party	Candidate	Votes	Dist.	Total	Dist.	Total	Dist.	Total	Dist.	Total	Dist.	Total	Dist.	Total	Dist.	Total
Quota (50% + 1)		11,667														
Labor	Olivia Savvas	8,599	+13	8,612	+12	8,624	+55	8,679	+88	8,767	+518	9,285	+1,026	10,311	+2,605	12,916
Liberal	Richard Harvey	8,076	+6	8,082	+12	8,094	+48	8,142	+123	8,265	+351	8,616	+265	8,881	+1,535	10,416
Independent	Frances Bedford	2,861	+21	2,882	+28	2,910	+47	2,957	+276	3,233	+436	3,669	+471	4,140	Excluded	
Greens	Adla Mattiske	1,344	+27	1,371	+7	1,378	+138	1,516	+46	1,562	+200	1,762	Excluded			
One Nation	Hayley Marley-Duncan	885	+9	894	+47	941	+33	974	Excluded							
Family First	Brett Green	844	+29	873	+119	992	+72	1,064	+441	1,505	Excluded					
Animal Justice	David Sherlock	351	+36	387	+6	393	Excluded									
Australian Family	Dan Casey	225	+6	231	Excluded											
Real Change	Kate Simpson	147	Excluded													

=== Playford ===
2022 South Australian state election: Playford
Party	Candidate	Votes	%	±%
Labor	John Fulbrook	11,922	53.5	+3.1
Liberal	Hemant Dave	5,511	24.7	+6.8
Greens	David Wright	2,118	9.5	+4.6
Family First	Rojan Jose	1,773	8.0	+8.0
Independent	Shane Quinn	973	4.4	+4.4
Total formal votes		22,297	95.7	
Informal votes		1,011	4.3	
Turnout		23,308	87.4	
Two-party-preferred result
Labor	John Fulbrook	14,777	66.3	−2.7
Liberal	Hemant Dave	7,520	33.7	+2.7
Labor hold		Swing	−2.7	

=== Port Adelaide ===
2022 South Australian state election: Port Adelaide
Party	Candidate	Votes	%	±%
Labor	Susan Close	14,074	58.3	+10.4
Liberal	Chad McLaren	5,448	22.6	+4.0
Greens	Jim Moss	2,471	10.2	+4.4
Family First	Lucia Snelling	1,204	5.0	+5.0
Animal Justice	Adrian Romeo	945	3.9	+0.0
Total formal votes		24,142	96.6	
Informal votes		850	3.4	
Turnout		24,992	88.1	
Two-party-preferred result
Labor	Susan Close	17,335	71.8	+5.0
Liberal	Chad McLaren	6,807	28.2	−5.0
Labor hold		Swing	+5.0	

=== Ramsay ===
2022 South Australian state election: Ramsay
Party	Candidate	Votes	%	±%
Labor	Zoe Bettison	13,401	60.0	+9.8
Liberal	Nicholas Charles	4,780	21.4	+5.5
Family First	Rolando See	2,556	11.4	+11.4
Greens	Dominique Lock	1,598	7.2	+1.3
Total formal votes		22,335	95.8	
Informal votes		968	4.2	
Turnout		23,303	83.8	
Two-party-preferred result
Labor	Zoe Bettison	15,620	69.9	+1.4
Liberal	Nicholas Charles	6,715	30.1	−1.4
Labor hold		Swing	+1.4	

Distribution of preferences: Ramsay
Party	Candidate	Votes	Round 1		Round 2	
Party	Candidate	Votes	Dist.	Total	Dist.	Total
Quota (50% + 1)		11,168				
Labor	Zoe Bettison	13,401	+886	14,287	+1,333	15,620
Liberal	Nicholas Charles	4,780	+214	4,994	+1,721	6,715
Family First	Roland See	2,556	+498	3,054	Excluded	
Greens	Dominique Lock	1,598	Excluded			

=== Reynell ===
2022 South Australian state election: Reynell
Party	Candidate	Votes	%	±%
Labor	Katrine Hildyard	12,458	54.5	+10.7
Liberal	Patrick Moller	5,639	24.7	−1.7
Greens	Lisa Adams	2,516	11.0	+5.5
Family First	Radosav Jovanovic	2,237	9.8	+9.8
Total formal votes		22,850	96.2	
Informal votes		902	3.8	
Turnout		23,752	87.4	
Two-party-preferred result
Labor	Katrine Hildyard	15,249	66.7	+7.3
Liberal	Patrick Moller	7,601	33.3	−7.3
Labor hold		Swing	+7.3	

Distribution of preferences: Reynell
Party	Candidate	Votes	Round 1		Round 2	
Party	Candidate	Votes	Dist.	Total	Dist.	Total
Quota (50% + 1)		11,426				
Labor	Katrine Hildyard	12,458	+470	12,928	+2,321	15,249
Liberal	Patrick Moller	5,639	+956	6,595	+1,006	7,601
Greens	Lisa Adams	2,516	+811	3,327	Excluded	
Family First	Radosav Jovanovic	2,237	Excluded			

=== Schubert ===
2022 South Australian state election: Schubert
Party	Candidate	Votes	%	±%
Liberal	Ashton Hurn	12,580	51.4	+2.1
Labor	Connor Watson	5,557	22.7	+1.9
Greens	Beverley Morris	2,493	10.2	+4.8
One Nation	Phill Mueller	1,658	6.8	+6.8
Family First	Alfred Gerhard	934	3.8	+3.8
Independent	Lea Rebane	707	2.9	+2.9
National	Bruce Preece	522	2.1	+2.1
Total formal votes		24,451	96.2	
Informal votes		960	3.8	
Turnout		25,411	92.7	
Two-party-preferred result
Liberal	Ashton Hurn	15,124	61.9	−3.8
Labor	Connor Watson	9,327	38.1	+3.8
Liberal hold		Swing	−3.8	

Distribution of preferences: Schubert
Party	Candidate	Votes	Round 1		Round 2		Round 3		Round 4		Round 5	
Party	Candidate	Votes	Dist.	Total	Dist.	Total	Dist.	Total	Dist.	Total	Dist.	Total
Quota (50% + 1)		12,226										
Liberal	Ashton Hurn	12,580	+226	12,806	+114	12,920	+239	13,159	+1,107	14,266	+858	15,124
Labor	Connor Watson	5,557	+32	5,589	+156	5,745	+139	5,884	+552	6,436	+2,891	9,327
Greens	Beverley Morris	2,493	+70	2,563	+219	2,782	+245	3,027	+722	3,749	Excluded	
One Nation	Phill Mueller	1,658	+71	1,729	+123	1,852	+529	2,381	Excluded			
Family First	Alfred Gerhard	934	+85	1,019	+133	1,152	Excluded					
Independent	Lea Rebane	707	+38	745	Excluded							
National	Bruce Preece	522	Excluded									

=== Stuart ===
2022 South Australian state election: Stuart
Party	Candidate	Votes	%	±%
Independent	Geoff Brock	10,396	48.5	+13.8
Liberal	Dan van Holst Pellekaan	6,079	28.3	−15.9
Labor	Andrew Wright	3,124	14.6	−0.8
One Nation	David Stone	1,192	5.5	+5.5
Greens	Beth Leese	660	3.1	−1.0
Total formal votes		21,451	97.6	
Informal votes		525	2.4	
Turnout		21,976	87.0	
Notional two-party-preferred count
Labor	Andrew Wright	10,900	50.8	+14.7
Liberal	Dan van Holst Pellekaan	10,551	49.2	−14.7
Two-candidate-preferred result
Independent	Geoff Brock	14,403	67.1	+67.1
Liberal	Dan van Holst Pellekaan	7,048	32.9	−28.7
Independent gain from Liberal				

Distribution of preferences: Stuart
Party	Candidate	Votes	Round 1		Round 2		Round 3	
Party	Candidate	Votes	Dist.	Total				
Quota (50% + 1)		10,726						
Independent	Geoff Brock	10,396	+260	10,656	+667	11,323	+3,080	14,403
Liberal	Dan van Holst Pellekaan	6,079	+101	6,180	+265	6,445	+603	7,048
Labor	Andrew Wright	3,124	+220	3,344	+339	3,683	Excluded	
One Nation	David Stone	1,192	+79	1,271	Excluded			
Greens	Beth Leese	660	Excluded					

=== Taylor ===
2022 South Australian state election: Taylor
Party	Candidate	Votes	%	±%
Labor	Nick Champion	11,752	53.4	+8.1
Liberal	Shawn Lock	4,629	21.1	+0.8
One Nation	Michelle Crowley	1,934	8.8	+8.8
Family First	Gary Balfort	1,695	7.7	+7.7
Greens	John Wishart	1,314	6.0	−1.0
Independent	Rita Kuhlmann	668	3.0	+3.0
Total formal votes		21,992	94.8	
Informal votes		1,204	5.2	
Turnout		23,196	83.6	
Two-party-preferred result
Labor	Nick Champion	15,319	69.7	+7.8
Liberal	Shawn Lock	6,673	30.3	−7.8
Labor hold		Swing	+7.8	

Distribution of preferences: Taylor
Party	Candidate	Votes	Round 1		Round 2		Round 3		Round 4	
Party	Candidate	Votes	Dist.	Total	Dist.	Total	Dist.	Total	Dist.	Total
Quota (50% + 1)		10,997								
Labor	Nick Champion	11,752	+129	11,881	+787	12,668	+475	13,143	+2,176	15,319
Liberal	Shawn Lock	4,629	+52	4,681	+135	4,816	+400	5,216	+1,457	6,673
One Nation	Michelle Crowley	1,934	+130	2,064	+94	2,158	Excluded			
Family First	Gary Balfort	1,695	+171	1,866	+484x	2,350	+1,283	3,633	Excluded	
Greens	John Wishart	1,314	+186	1,500	Excluded					
Independent	Rita Kuhlmann	668	Excluded							

=== Torrens ===
2022 South Australian state election: Torrens
Party	Candidate	Votes	%	±%
Labor	Dana Wortley	11,732	48.6	+5.3
Liberal	Ursula Henderson	8,114	33.6	−3.2
Greens	Lazaras Panayiotou	2,559	10.6	+3.3
Family First	Mervin Joshua	1,737	7.2	+7.2
Total formal votes		24,142	96.9	
Informal votes		772	3.1	
Turnout		24,914	88.4	
Two-party-preferred result
Labor	Dana Wortley	14,475	60.0	+4.3
Liberal	Ursula Henderson	9,667	40.0	−4.3
Labor hold		Swing	+4.3	

Distribution of preferences: Torrens
Party	Candidate	Votes	Round 1		Round 2	
Party	Candidate	Votes	Dist.	Total		
Quota (50% + 1)		12,072				
Labor	Dana Wortley	11,732	+334	12,066	+2,409	14,475
Liberal	Ursula Henderson	8,114	+963	9,077	+590	9,667
Greens	Lazaras Panayiotou	2,559	+440	2,999	Excluded	
Family First	Mervin Joshua	1,737	Excluded			

=== Unley ===
2022 South Australian state election: Unley
Party	Candidate	Votes	%	±%
Liberal	David Pisoni	12,019	49.2	−2.7
Labor	Ryan Harrison	7,825	32.1	+8.8
Greens	Georgie Hart	4,577	18.7	+9.6
Total formal votes		24,421	98.2	
Informal votes		439	1.8	
Turnout		24,860	90.1	
Two-party-preferred result
Liberal	David Pisoni	12,737	52.2	−9.4
Labor	Ryan Harrison	11,684	47.8	+9.4
Liberal hold		Swing	−9.4	

Distribution of preferences: Unley
Party	Candidate	Votes	Round 1	
Party	Candidate	Votes	Dist.	Total
Quota (50% + 1)		12,211		
Liberal	David Pisoni	12,019	+718	12,737
Labor	Ryan Harrison	7,825	+3,859	11,684
Greens	Georgie Hart	4,577	Excluded	

=== Waite ===
2022 South Australian state election: Waite
Party	Candidate	Votes	%	±%
Labor	Catherine Hutchesson	6,698	26.6	+2.5
Liberal	Alexander Hyde	6,509	25.8	−18.7
Independent	Sam Duluk	4,949	19.7	+19.7
Independent	Heather Holmes-Ross	3,665	14.6	+14.6
Greens	Brendan White	2,872	11.4	+0.9
Animal Justice	Ben Freeling	482	1.9	+1.9
Total formal votes		25,175	97.6	
Informal votes		607	2.4	
Turnout		25,782	92.6	
Two-party-preferred result
Labor	Catherine Hutchesson	13,597	54.0	+11.4
Liberal	Alexander Hyde	11,578	46.0	−11.4
Labor gain from Liberal		Swing	+11.4	

Distribution of preferences: Waite
Party	Candidate	Votes	Round 1		Round 2		Round 3		Round 4	
Party	Candidate	Votes	Dist.	Total	Dist.	Total	Dist.	Total	Dist.	Total
Quota (50% + 1)		12,588								
Labor	Catherine Hutchesson	6,698	+65	6,763	+1,321	8,084	+3,281	11,365	+2,232	13,597
Liberal	Alexander Hyde	6,509	+42	6,551	+152	6,703	+652	7,355	4,223	11,578
Independent	Sam Duluk	4,949	+81	5,030	+252	5,282	+1,173	6,455	Excluded	
Independent	Heather Holmes-Ross	3,665	+109	3,774	+1,332	5,106	Excluded			
Greens	Brendan White	2,872	+185	3,057	Excluded					
Animal Justice	Ben Freeling	482	Excluded							

=== West Torrens ===
2022 South Australian state election: West Torrens
Party	Candidate	Votes	%	±%
Labor	Tom Koutsantonis	12,496	54.9	+4.3
Liberal	Helika Cruz	6,353	27.9	−2.4
Greens	Peta-Anne Louth	3,919	17.2	+5.8
Total formal votes		22,768	97.0	
Informal votes		708	3.0	
Turnout		23,476	89.2	
Two-party-preferred result
Labor	Tom Koutsantonis	15,654	68.8	+4.5
Liberal	Helika Cruz	7,114	31.2	−4.5
Labor hold		Swing	+4.5	

Distribution of preferences: West Torrens
Party	Candidate	Votes	Round 1	
Party	Candidate	Votes	Dist.	Total
Quota (50% + 1)		11,385		
Labor	Tom Koutsantonis	12,496	+3,158	15,654
Liberal	Helika Cruz	6,353	+761	7,114
Greens	Alexandra McGee	3,919	Excluded	

=== Wright ===
2022 South Australian state election: Wright
Party	Candidate	Votes	%	±%
Labor	Blair Boyer	12,231	52.0	+14.1
Liberal	Graham Reynolds	7,550	32.1	+1.0
Greens	Alexandra McGee	2,001	8.5	+2.7
Family First	Kym Nancarrow	1,737	7.4	+7.4
Total formal votes		23,519	97.2	
Informal votes		670	2.8	
Turnout		24,189	90.7	
Two-party-preferred result
Labor	Blair Boyer	14,548	61.9	+8.8
Liberal	Graham Reynolds	8,971	38.1	−8.8
Labor hold		Swing	+8.8	

Distribution of preferences: Wright
Party	Candidate	Votes	Round 1		Round 2	
Party	Candidate	Votes	Dist.	Total	Dist.	Total
Quota (50% + 1)		11,760				
Labor	Blair Boyer	12,231	+398	12,629	+1,919	14,548
Liberal	Graham Reynolds	7,550	+859	8,409	+562	8,971
Greens	Alexandra McGee	2,001	+480	2,481	Excluded	
Family First	Kym Nancarrow	1,737	Excluded			
