= Electoral results for the district of Davenport =

South Australian district election results

This is a list of electoral results for the Electoral district of Davenport in South Australian state elections.

== Members for Davenport ==
Member	Party	Term
Joyce Steele	Liberal and Country	1970–1973
Dean Brown	Liberal and Country	1973–1973
Dean Brown	Liberal	1973–1985
Stan Evans	Independent Liberal	1985–1985
Stan Evans	Liberal	1985–1993
Iain Evans	Liberal	1993–2014
Sam Duluk	Liberal	2015–2018
Steve Murray	Liberal	2018–2022
Erin Thompson	Labor	2022–present

== Election results ==
=== Elections in the 2020s ===
==== 2026 ====
2026 South Australian state election: Davenport
Party	Candidate	Votes	%	±%
Labor	Erin Thompson	11,829	48.6	+7.8
One Nation	Jon Howell	4,921	20.2	+20.2
Liberal	Trent Burnard	3,601	14.8	−26.4
Greens	John Photakis	2,737	11.2	+1.8
Independent	Dan Golding	718	2.9	−5.6
Family First	Mathew Francis	400	1.6	+1.6
Australian Family	Rachel Smith	147	0.6	+0.6
Total formal votes		24,353	97.4	−0.2
Informal votes		648	2.6	+0.2
Turnout		25,001	91.7	−0.3
Two-party-preferred result
Labor	Erin Thompson	16,171	66.4	+13.0
One Nation	Jonathan Howell	8,182	33.6	+33.6
Labor hold				

==== 2022 ====
2022 South Australian state election: Davenport
Party	Candidate	Votes	%	±%
Liberal	Steve Murray	9,928	41.2	−1.3
Labor	Erin Thompson	9,835	40.8	+15.4
Greens	John Photakis	2,266	9.4	+2.2
Independent	Dan Golding	2,063	8.6	+2.2
Total formal votes		24,092	97.6	
Informal votes		595	2.4	
Turnout		24,687	92.0	
Two-party-preferred result
Labor	Erin Thompson	12,870	53.4	+11.6
Liberal	Steve Murray	11,222	46.6	−11.6
Labor gain from Liberal		Swing	+11.6	

Distribution of preferences: Davenport
Party	Candidate	Votes	Round 1		Round 2	
Party	Candidate	Votes	Dist.	Total	Dist.	Total
Quota (50% + 1)		12,047				
Liberal	Steve Murray	9,928	+822	10,750	+472	11,222
Labor	Erin Thompson	9,835	+733	10,568	+2,302	12,870
Greens	John Photakis	2,266	+508	2,774	Excluded	
Independent	Dan Golding	2,063	Excluded			

=== Elections in the 2010s ===
==== 2018 ====
2018 South Australian state election: Davenport
Party	Candidate	Votes	%	±%
Liberal	Steve Murray	9,306	42.1	−0.3
Labor	Jonette Thorsteinsen	5,275	23.9	+3.8
SA Best	Karen Hockley	4,604	20.8	+20.8
Greens	John Photakis	1,600	7.2	−0.2
Independent	Dan Golding	1,317	6.0	+6.0
Total formal votes		22,102	96.5	−1.3
Informal votes		792	3.5	+1.3
Turnout		22,894	92.3	−0.7
Two-party-preferred result
Liberal	Steve Murray	12,992	58.8	−0.7
Labor	Jonette Thorsteinsen	9,110	41.2	+0.7
Liberal hold		Swing	−0.7	

2015 Davenport state by-election
Party	Candidate	Votes	%	±%
Liberal	Sam Duluk	9,740	46.9	−4.1
Labor	Mark Ward	6,927	33.4	+4.8
Greens	Jody Moate	2,584	12.5	−2.8
Family First	Natasha Edmonds	816	3.9	−1.2
Independent Australian Democrats	Jeanie Walker	685	3.3	+3.3
Total formal votes		20,752	97.1	−0.7
Informal votes		613	2.9	+0.7
Turnout		21,365	85.7	−7.7
Two-party-preferred result
Liberal	Sam Duluk	11,021	53.1	−5.0
Labor	Mark Ward	9,731	46.9	+5.0
Liberal hold		Swing	−5.0	

2014 South Australian state election: Davenport
Party	Candidate	Votes	%	±%
Liberal	Iain Evans	11,581	51.0	+1.5
Labor	Lucie Lock-Weir	6,498	28.6	+4.1
Greens	Stephen Thomas	3,468	15.3	+1.6
Family First	Natasha Edmonds	1,158	5.1	+1.1
Total formal votes		22,705	97.8	+0.4
Informal votes		511	2.2	−0.4
Turnout		23,216	93.4	−0.2
Two-party-preferred result
Liberal	Iain Evans	13,192	58.1	−2.8
Labor	Lucie Lock-Weir	9,513	41.9	+2.8
Liberal hold		Swing	−2.8	

2010 South Australian state election: Davenport
Party	Candidate	Votes	%	±%
Liberal	Iain Evans	10,648	52.0	+3.7
Labor	James Wangmann	5,134	25.1	−5.8
Greens	Nat Elliott	2,892	14.1	+2.7
Family First	Natasha Burfield	808	3.9	−0.6
Independent	Robert de Jonge	568	2.8	+2.8
Democrats	Bridgid Medder	408	2.0	−2.7
Total formal votes		20,458	97.3	
Informal votes		542	2.7	
Turnout		21,000	93.6	
Two-party-preferred result
Liberal	Iain Evans	12,642	61.8	+5.5
Labor	James Wangmann	7,816	38.2	−5.5
Liberal hold		Swing	+5.5	

=== Elections in the 2000s ===
2006 South Australian state election: Davenport
Party	Candidate	Votes	%	±%
Liberal	Iain Evans	9,579	48.5	−3.3
Labor	Gerry Bowen	6,111	30.9	+8.1
Greens	Adrian Miller	2,250	11.4	+11.4
Democrats	Bridgid Medder	927	4.7	−12.1
Family First	Toni Howard	897	4.5	+4.5
Total formal votes		19,764	97.7	+0.0
Informal votes		474	2.3	+0.0
Turnout		20,238	92.9	−1.2
Two-party-preferred result
Liberal	Iain Evans	11,143	56.4	−5.1
Labor	Gerry Bowen	8,621	43.6	+5.1
Liberal hold		Swing	−5.1	

2002 South Australian state election: Davenport
Party	Candidate	Votes	%	±%
Liberal	Iain Evans	10,337	51.8	+2.6
Labor	Gerry Bowen	4,563	22.8	+0.6
Democrats	Yvonne Caddy	3,369	16.9	−3.3
Independent	Ralph Hahnheuser	540	2.7	+2.7
SA First	Brenton Chappell	533	2.7	+2.7
Independent	Moira Humphries	365	1.8	+1.8
One Nation	F. Vandenbroek	263	1.3	+1.3
Total formal votes		19,970	97.7	
Informal votes		477	2.3	
Turnout		20,447	94.1	
Two-party-preferred result
Liberal	Iain Evans	12,289	61.5	+7.1
Labor	Gerry Bowen	7,681	38.5	+38.5
Liberal hold		Swing	N/A	

=== Elections in the 1990s ===
1997 South Australian state election: Davenport
Party	Candidate	Votes	%	±%
Liberal	Iain Evans	8,913	47.8	−10.1
Labor	Jillian Bradbury	4,113	22.1	+9.9
Democrats	Gordon Russell	3,462	18.6	−7.9
Independent	Bob Marshall	1,140	6.1	+6.1
Independent	Jack King	539	2.9	+2.9
Independent	Annie Seaman	472	2.5	+2.5
Total formal votes		18,639	96.3	−1.7
Informal votes		715	3.7	+1.7
Turnout		19,354	91.4	
Two-party-preferred result
Liberal	Iain Evans	11,883	63.8	−8.5
Labor	Jillian Bradbury	6,756	36.2	+8.5
Two-candidate-preferred result
Liberal	Iain Evans	10,115	54.3	−5.9
Democrats	Gordon Russell	8,524	45.7	+5.9
Liberal hold		Swing	−5.9	

1993 South Australian state election: Davenport
Party	Candidate	Votes	%	±%
Liberal	Iain Evans	11,691	58.0	+4.1
Democrats	Mike Elliott	5,347	26.5	+9.5
Labor	Pamela Kelly	2,458	12.2	−15.2
Independent	Mavis Casey	401	2.0	+2.0
Natural Law	Frances Mowling	277	1.4	+1.4
Total formal votes		20,174	98.0	−0.3
Informal votes		412	2.0	+0.3
Turnout		20,586	94.2	
Two-party-preferred result
Liberal	Iain Evans	14,572	72.2	+9.4
Labor	Pamela Kelly	5,602	27.8	−9.4
Two-candidate-preferred result
Liberal	Iain Evans	12,144	60.2	−2.6
Democrats	Mike Elliott	8,030	39.8	+39.8
Liberal hold		Swing	N/A	

=== Elections in the 1980s ===
1989 South Australian state election: Davenport
Party	Candidate	Votes	%	±%
Liberal	Stan Evans	10,146	55.8	+15.2
Labor	John Whyatt	4,176	23.0	−2.0
Democrats	Judith Smith	3,451	19.0	+14.9
Independent	Lorraine Foster	399	2.2	+2.2
Total formal votes		18,172	98.4	+0.2
Informal votes		288	1.6	−0.2
Turnout		18,460	94.6	+0.9
Two-party-preferred result
Liberal	Stan Evans	11,983	65.9	−3.4
Labor	John Whyatt	6,189	34.1	+3.4
Liberal gain from Independent		Swing	N/A	

1985 South Australian state election: Davenport
Party	Candidate	Votes	%	±%
Liberal	Dean Brown	6,991	40.6	−25.4
Independent Liberal	Stan Evans	5,224	30.3	+30.3
Labor	Mark Boughey	4,307	25.0	+3.0
Democrats	Kevin Angove	711	4.1	−7.9
Total formal votes		17,233	98.2	
Informal votes		309	1.8	
Turnout		17,542	93.7	
Two-party-preferred result
Liberal	Dean Brown	11,943	69.3	−2.7
Labor	Mark Boughey	5,290	30.7	+2.7
Two-candidate-preferred result
Independent Liberal	Stan Evans	9,062	52.6	+52.6
Liberal	Dean Brown	8,171	47.4	−24.6
Independent Liberal gain from Liberal		Swing	N/A	

1982 South Australian state election: Davenport
Party	Candidate	Votes	%	±%
Liberal	Dean Brown	12,133	71.2	−3.8
Labor	Emanuel Frossinakis	3,102	18.2	+2.6
Democrats	Merilyn de Guerin Pedrick	1,796	10.6	+1.2
Total formal votes		17,031	96.7	−1.3
Informal votes		584	3.3	+1.3
Turnout		17,615	92.5	−0.1
Two-party-preferred result
Liberal	Dean Brown	13,031	76.5	−3.2
Labor	Emanuel Frossinakis	4,000	23.5	+3.2
Liberal hold		Swing	−3.2	

=== Elections in the 1970s ===
1979 South Australian state election: Davenport
Party	Candidate	Votes	%	±%
Liberal	Dean Brown	12,253	75.0	+10.5
Labor	David Cox	2,548	15.6	−4.6
Democrats	John Phillips	1,533	9.4	−3.8
Total formal votes		16,334	98.0	−0.8
Informal votes		325	2.0	+0.8
Turnout		16,659	92.6	−0.3
Two-party-preferred result
Liberal	Dean Brown	13,020	79.7	+7.5
Labor	David Cox	3,314	20.3	−7.5
Liberal hold		Swing	+7.5	

1977 South Australian state election: Davenport
Party	Candidate	Votes	%	±%
Liberal	Dean Brown	10,311	64.5	+11.8
Labor	Terry Cameron	3,226	20.2	−2.8
Democrats	Michael Lee	2,112	13.2	+13.2
Workers	Ewan Hutchison	345	2.1	+2.1
Total formal votes		15,994	98.8	
Informal votes		200	1.2	
Turnout		16,194	92.9	
Two-party-preferred result
Liberal	Dean Brown	11,865	74.2	+0.9
Labor	Terry Cameron	4,129	25.8	−0.9
Liberal hold		Swing	+0.9	

1975 South Australian state election: Davenport
Party	Candidate	Votes	%	±%
Liberal	Dean Brown	9,293	52.8	−15.4
Labor	Mark Pickhaver	4,496	25.6	−6.2
Liberal Movement	Lawrence Delroy	3,809	21.6	+21.6
Total formal votes		17,598	97.7	+0.2
Informal votes		408	2.3	−0.2
Turnout		18,006	93.4	−0.6
Two-party-preferred result
Liberal	Dean Brown	12,723	72.3	+4.1
Labor	Mark Pickhaver	4,875	27.7	−4.1
Liberal hold		Swing	+4.1	

1973 South Australian state election: Davenport
Party	Candidate	Votes	%	±%
Liberal and Country	Dean Brown	11,082	68.2	+0.2
Labor	Graham Jamieson	5,176	31.8	−0.2
Total formal votes		16,258	97.5	−0.7
Informal votes		419	2.5	+0.7
Turnout		16,677	94.0	−1.0
Liberal and Country hold		Swing	+0.2	

1970 South Australian state election: Davenport
Party	Candidate	Votes	%	±%
Liberal and Country	Joyce Steele	10,298	68.0	
Labor	Anne Levy	4,835	32.0	
Total formal votes		15,133	98.2	
Informal votes		270	1.8	
Turnout		15,403	95.0	
Liberal and Country hold		Swing		
