= Carlos Quaremba =

Australian politician (born 1970s)

The Honourable Carlos Quaremba MLC
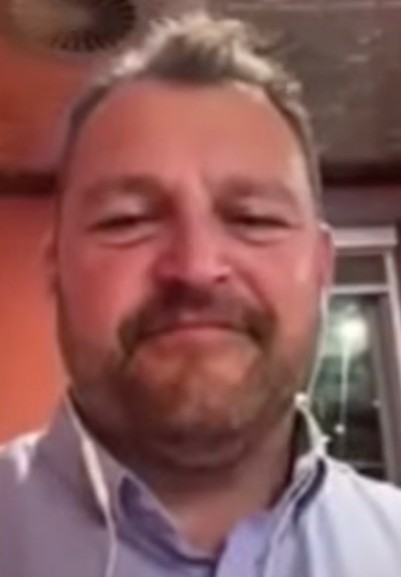
- Quaremba in 2026

Member of the South Australian Legislative Council
- Incumbent
- Assumed office 21 March 2026

Personal details
- Born: 1975 or 1976 (age 50–51) Argentina
- Party: One Nation

Carlos Quaremba (born 1975 or 1976) is an Australian politician who has sat as a member of the South Australian Legislative Council since the 2026 state election. Quaremba is a member of Pauline Hanson's One Nation, and serves as that party's state president in South Australia. Prior to his election to the Legislative Council, Quaremba was a builder and a member of the Victor Harbor City Council.

== Early life and education ==
Carlos Quaremba was born in 1975 or 1976 in Argentina. His family migrated to Australia in 1977, when Quaremba was two, and moved initially to Melbourne before settling in the Adelaide suburb of Croydon. Quaremba has described the Croydon of his youth as being predominately populated by white Anglo-Saxon Australians, stating "I was the only wog in the whole school", but added that his family was "part of the community" and participated in community activities.

He became a builder.

== Political career ==
Quaremba has said that his affinity with the One Nation party comes in part because of migrating from a country "wrecked by socialism".

He stood for parliament twice in 2022 — firstly in the state election in the district of Finniss, and secondly in the federal election in the division of Barker, both times representing Pauline Hanson's One Nation. Quaremba was successfully elected to the Victor Harbor City Council at the 2022 South Australian local elections, becoming one of nine councillors in the city.

Quaremba was first reported to have become the state president of One Nation in South Australia in May 2025. He was named as One Nation's lead candidate in the 2026 state election for the Legislative Council in August 2025, and took leave from his council duties in December 2025.

In February 2026, Cory Bernardi was announced as the new lead candidate for One Nation in the Legislative Council, resulting in Quaremba's demotion to the second position on One Nation's ticket. At the 2026 state election, Quaremba was one of three of his party's candidates elected to the Legislative Council, and will serve an eight-year term.
