= 2015 Davenport state by-election =

- 31 January 2015
	First party	Second party	Third party
Candidate	Sam Duluk	Mark Ward	Jody Moate
Party	Liberal	Labor	Greens
Popular vote	9,740	6,927	2,584
Percentage	46.9%	33.4%	12.5%
Swing	▼4.1pp	▲4.8pp	▼2.8pp
TPP	53.1%	46.9%
TPP swing	▼5.0pp	▲5.0pp
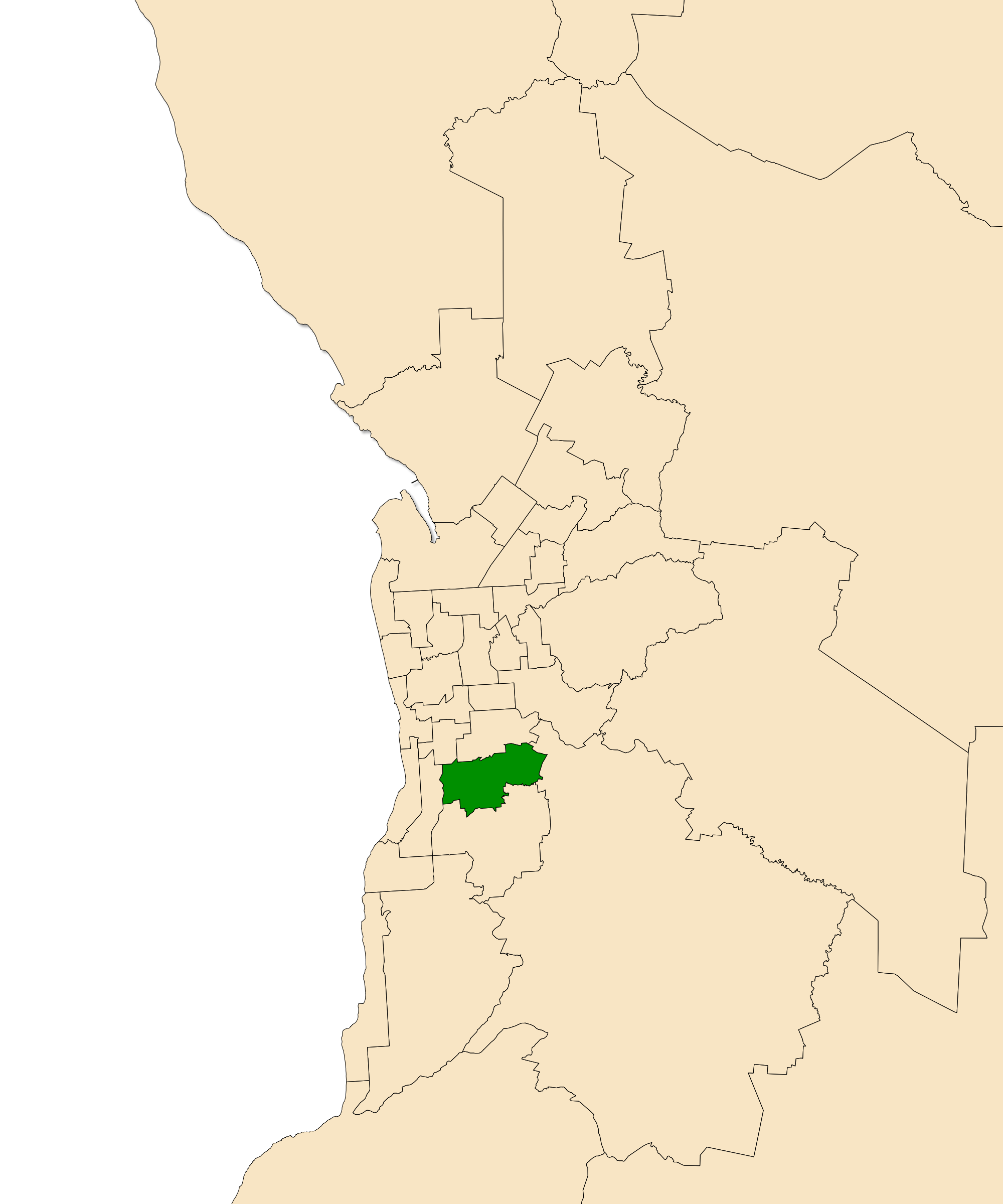
- Electoral district of Davenport in the southern metropolitan area of Adelaide.
MP before election
Iain Evans
Liberal
Elected MP
Sam Duluk
Liberal

A by-election for the seat of Davenport in the South Australian House of Assembly was held on 31 January 2015. The by-election was triggered by the resignation of Liberal Party of Australia MP and former Liberal leader Iain Evans, who retained the seat at the 2014 election on a 58.1 (−2.8) percent two-party-preferred vote. Liberal Sam Duluk went on to win the seat despite a five-point two-party swing, turning the historically safe seat of Davenport in to a marginal for the first time.

The by-election was held on the same day as the 2015 Queensland state election.

== Dates ==
Date	Event
3 January 2015	Writ of election issued by the Governor
13 January 2015	Close of electoral rolls
16 January 2015	Close of nominations
31 January 2015	Polling day, between the hours of 8 am and 6 pm

== Candidates ==
5 candidates in ballot paper order
Liberal Party of Australia	Sam Duluk	Accountant. Liberal candidate for seat of Fisher at the previous election.
Family First Party	Natasha Edmonds	Family First candidate for Davenport at the previous election.
Independent Australian Democrats	Jeanie Walker	Involved in property investing and management and is an Aboriginal Family Violence Case Manager. Contested the 2014 Fisher by-election.
Australian Labor Party	Mark Ward	City of Mitcham councillor for last eight years, has served as Deputy Mayor. Urrbrae Agricultural High School teacher. Centennial Park Cemetery board member.
Greens	Jody Moate	Retail sector worker. Volunteers with numerous community groups.

== Result ==
2015 Davenport state by-election
Party	Candidate	Votes	%	±%
Liberal	Sam Duluk	9,740	46.9	−4.1
Labor	Mark Ward	6,927	33.4	+4.8
Greens	Jody Moate	2,584	12.5	−2.8
Family First	Natasha Edmonds	816	3.9	−1.2
Independent Democrat	Jeanie Walker	685	3.3	+3.3
Total formal votes		20,752	97.1	−0.7
Informal votes		613	2.9	+0.7
Turnout		21,365	85.7	−7.7
Two-party-preferred result
Liberal	Sam Duluk	11,021	53.1	−5.0
Labor	Mark Ward	9,731	46.9	+5.0
Liberal hold		Swing	−5.0	

Liberal Sam Duluk won the seat with a -4.1 point swing, with the Liberal party failing to win outright and relying on preferences. South Australian Newspoll at the time of the Davenport by-election recorded a statewide seven percent two-party swing from Liberal to Labor. ABC election analyst Antony Green described the Davenport by-election as "another poor result for the South Australian Liberal Party" following the 2014 Fisher by-election which saw Labor go from minority to majority government following a 7.3 percent two-party swing. As with the Fisher by-election, much of the anti-Liberal swing was attributed to the unpopularity of then Prime Minister Tony Abbott, and a remark from then Defence Minister David Johnston several days before the Fisher by-election that he wouldn't trust South Australia's Australian Submarine Corporation to "build a canoe". Additionally, just a couple of days before the Davenport by-election, Abbott's infamous knighting of Prince Philip occurred.

== See also ==
- 2014 Fisher state by-election
- 2018 South Australian state election#Polling
- List of South Australian House of Assembly by-elections
- Electoral results for the district of Davenport
