= Catherine Hutchesson =

Australian politician

Catherine Hutchesson MP
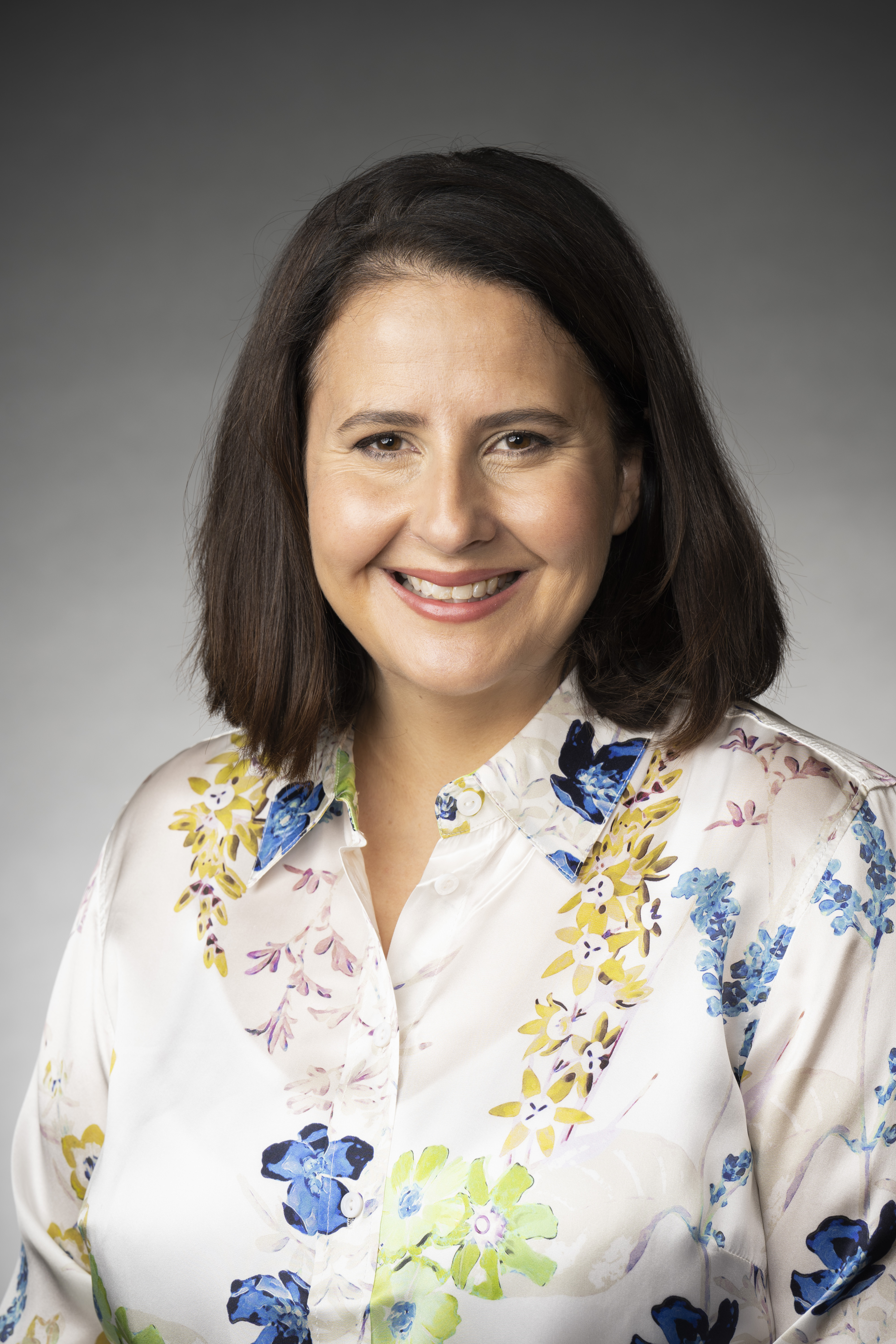

Member of the South Australian House of Assembly for Waite
- Incumbent
- Assumed office 19 March 2022
- Preceded by: Sam Duluk
- Majority: 54 per cent

Personal details
- Party: Labor
- Education: Bachelor of Science
- Alma mater: Flinders University
- Committees: Natural Resources; Endometriosis
- Website: ALP website

Catherine Louise Hutchesson is an Australian politician. She has been a Labor Party member of the South Australian House of Assembly since the 2022 state election, representing Waite. With a swing of 11.4 per cent, she defeated the independent member Sam Duluk, a former Liberal Party member who had held the seat since 2018. With the exception of Duluk's two years as an independent, the constituency had been held by the Liberal Party for the previous 29 years. Counting its time as Mitcham, the seat had only ever been held by LCL/Liberals or independent members dating back to 1938. She re-contested the seat at the 2026 state election, and achieved a further swing of nearly 16 per cent, bringing the seat margin to almost 20 per cent.

Hutchesson grew up within the boundaries of the current seat of Waite, has a Bachelor of Science, and prior to her election to Parliament had been a chef and then worked in the banking and finance sector where she was a union industrial advocate. She has also been active in the Country Fire Service as a volunteer firefighter. She was the unsuccessful Labor candidate in Waite in the 2018 state election.

== Personal life and career ==
Catherine Louise Hutchesson grew up in Glenalta and has lived in the district for more than forty years. She worked at the Blackwood Fitness Centre, studied community service at the Panorama campus of TAFE South Australia, and studied at Flinders University where she graduated with a Bachelor of Science. She also studied at the William Angliss Institute of TAFE, where she completed a Certificate III in Commercial Cookery, and worked as a head chef. After moving to the banking and finance sector she became an industrial advocate for the Finance Sector Union. She is also a volunteer firefighter with the Upper Sturt Country Fire Service Brigade and the representative of her brigade to the CFS Volunteers' Association and delegate to the CFS Group that includes Upper Sturt. She has also been vice-president of the Upper Sturt Soldiers' Memorial Hall committee, and president of the Upper Sturt branch of the Country Women's Association in South Australia.

== Political career ==
Hutchesson was the Labor candidate for the Waite at the 2018 state election, when she received 42.2 per cent of the two-party-preferred vote (2PP), a swing of 2.4 percent to Labor, against Liberal Sam Duluk, who transferred from neighbouring Davenport. She received 23.5 per cent of the first-preference votes. A post-election redistribution notionally lifted her first-preference vote to 24 per cent, and a 2PP of 42.6 per cent. The constituency had long been considered a blue-ribbon Liberal seat. Its predecessor seat, Mitcham, had only ever been held by Liberal or independent members since 1938, a tradition maintained when it was renamed Waite in 1993.

She was again the Labor Party candidate for Waite at the 2022 state election, when she received 54 per cent of the 2PP, achieving an 11.4 per cent swing to the Labor Party, and defeating Duluk, former Liberal Party member who had been an independent for two years. Hutchesson's share of the first-preference votes was 26.6 per cent. Since 3 May 2022 she has been a member of the parliamentary Natural Resources Committee, and a member of the Endometriosis Committee since 21 March 2024. She was a member of the Access to Urinary Tract Infection Treatment Committee from 1 December 2022 to 17 November 2023. She was also a member of the select committee on the Waite Trust Bill 2025.

Hutchesson picked up a swing of nearly 16 per cent at the 2026 election amid the Liberals' collapse across the state. This swelled her majority to almost 20 percent, on paper turning Waite into a safe Labor seat.

== Footnotes ==
South Australian House of Assembly
Preceded by Sam Duluk	Member for Waite; 2022–present	Incumbent
