= Erin Thompson (politician) =

Australian politician

Erin Thompson MP
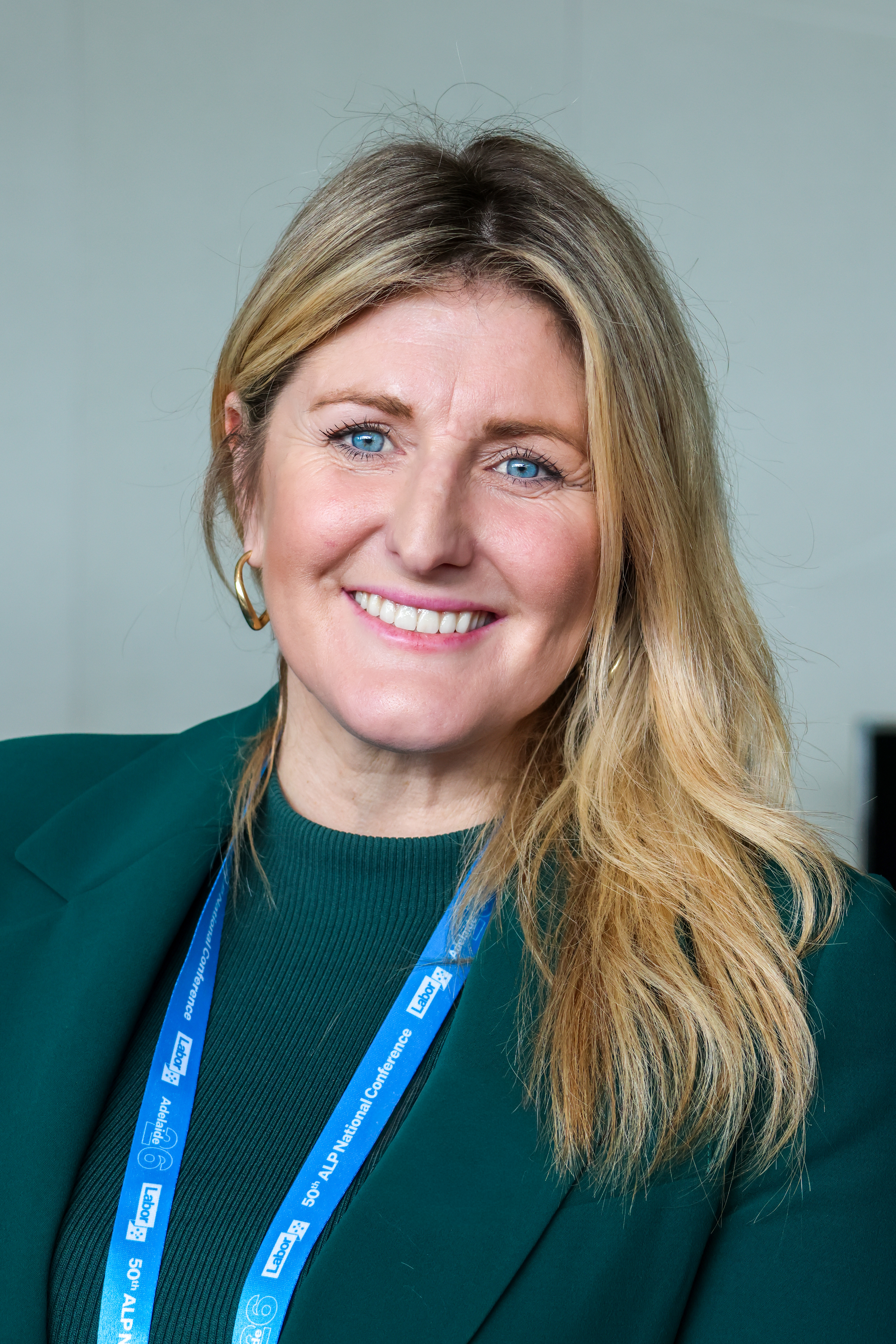
- Thompson in 2026

Member of the South Australian House of Assembly for Davenport
- Incumbent
- Assumed office 19 March 2022
- Preceded by: Steve Murray
- Majority: 53.4 per cent

Personal details
- Party: Labor
- Committees: Crime and Public Integrity Policy; Environment, Resources and Development; Publishing
- Website: ALP website

Erin Louise Thompson is an Australian politician. She has been a Labor Party member of the South Australian House of Assembly since the 2022 state election, representing Davenport. With a swing of 11.6 per cent, she defeated the Liberal Party member, Steve Murray, who had held the seat since 2018. Until the 2022 state election, Davenport had been held exclusively by Liberal Party members since its creation prior to the 1970 election. According to ABC election analyst Antony Green, prior to the 2022 election the frequent redistributions had little impact on the Liberal margin in Davenport, but there had been a slow narrowing between the Davenport results and the state-wide Liberal two-party-preferred vote.

Prior to her preselection, Thompson had served as elected mayor of the City of Onkaparinga, taking leave of absence to campaign for Davenport.

== Personal life and career ==
Erin Louise Thompson attended St Clare's College in Canberra, and completed an Advanced Diploma of Tourism and Marketing and a Diploma in Management. She lives in Happy Valley, and formerly worked as a communications officer for the City of Unley. Thompson assisted former Unley mayor Lachlan Clyne with his unsuccessful campaign to win the seat of Badcoe for the Liberal Party in the 2018 state election.

== Political career ==
Thompson was a candidate for mayor of the City of Onkaparinga in the 2018 South Australian local government elections, after the council – the largest in the state by population – was beset by financial and leadership issues in the previous term. Thompson was elected from a field of five candidates, and also received the largest number of first-preference votes, a total of 7,757 votes from 31,599 formal ballots cast. In September 2020, Thompson was elected as a member of the Greater Adelaide Region Organisation of Councils Committee established by the Local Government Association to "lead regional advocacy, policy initiation and review, leadership engagement and capacity building in the greater Adelaide region".

Thompson was the Labor Party candidate for the South Australian House of Assembly electoral district of Davenport at the 2022 state election, and took leave of absence from her duties as mayor of Onkaparinga to campaign. She received 53.4 per cent of the two-party-preferred vote (2PP), achieving an 11.6 per cent swing to the Labor Party, and defeating the Liberal Party member, Steve Murray, who had held the seat since 2018. Thompson's share of the first-preference votes was 40.8 per cent. Until the 2022 state election, Davenport had been held exclusively by Liberal Party members since its creation prior to the 1970 election. According to ABC election analyst Antony Green, prior to the 2022 election the frequent redistributions had little impact on the Liberal margin in Davenport, but there had been a slow narrowing between the Davenport results and the state-wide Liberal two-party-preferred vote.

Since 3 May 2022 Thompson has been a member of the following parliamentary committees: crime and public integrity policy; environment, resources and development; and publishing. From 6 July to 17 November 2023 she was also a member of the Artificial Intelligence Committee.

== Footnotes ==
South Australian House of Assembly
Preceded by Steve Murray	Member for Davenport; 2022–present	Incumbent
