= 2022 South Australian state election =

- 19 March 2022

All 47 seats in the House of Assembly 24 seats are needed for a majority 11 (of the 22) seats in the Legislative Council
- Opinion polls
- Registered: 1,266,719 ▲5.4%
- Turnout: 1,127,642 (89%) (▼1.98 pp)
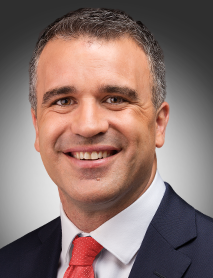

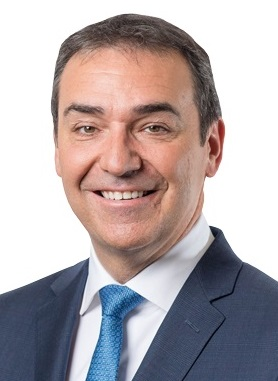
	First party	Second party
Leader	Peter Malinauskas	Steven Marshall
Party	Labor	Liberal
Leader since	9 April 2018	4 February 2013
Leader's seat	Croydon	Dunstan
Last election	19 seats	25 seats
Seats won	27	16
Seat change	▲8	▼9
Primary vote	436,134	389,218
Percentage	39.97%	35.67%
Swing	▲7.18	▼2.30
TPP	54.59%	45.41%
TPP swing	▲6.52	▼6.52
- Winning margin by electorate.
Premier before election
Steven Marshall
Liberal
Elected Premier
Peter Malinauskas
Labor

The 2022 South Australian state election was held on 19 March 2022 to elect members to the 55th Parliament of South Australia. All 47 seats in the House of Assembly (the lower house, whose members were elected at the 2018 election), and half the seats in the Legislative Council (the upper house, last filled at the 2014 election) were up for re-election.

The one-term incumbent Liberal government, led by Premier Steven Marshall, was defeated in a landslide by the opposition Labor Party, led by Opposition Leader Peter Malinauskas. Marshall conceded to Malinauskas about three hours after the polls closed. It is the first time since 1982, and only the fourth time since 1933, that a sitting government in South Australia has been defeated after a single term.

Labor won 27 seats in the lower house, while the Liberals retained 16 seats—with the remaining four seats won by independents. The new ministry was sworn in two days after the election, and Malinauskas became the state's 47th Premier.

In the 22-seat upper house where 11 seats were up for election, the result was five Labor, four Liberal, one Green, and one One Nation, for a total of nine Labor government seats, eight Liberal opposition seats, with five crossbenchers—two Green, two SA Best, and one One Nation. Consequently, the new Labor government would require an additional three non-government votes to pass legislation; however, the Liberal upper house President was unexpectedly re-elected to the Presidency, which gave the Labor government nine of 21 seats during votes on the floor, meaning that only an additional two non-government votes are required to pass legislation.

Like federal elections, South Australia has compulsory voting, uses full-preference instant-runoff voting for single-member electorates in the lower house, and optional preference single transferable voting in the proportionally represented upper house. The election was conducted by the Electoral Commission of South Australia (ECSA), an independent body answerable to Parliament.

== Background ==
=== House of Assembly ===
In the House of Assembly at the 2018 election, the Liberal opposition formed a two-seat majority government with 25 of 47 seats. The former 16-year four-term Labor government went in to opposition with 19 seats. The crossbench was represented by 3 independents: Frances Bedford, Troy Bell and Geoff Brock. The Liberals won 51.9% of the statewide two-party-preferred vote, which was actually a slight swing toward Labor.

==== Government loses its majority (2021) ====
The Liberal Party's already slender majority was further reduced when in, February 2020, Sam Duluk, the member for Waite, had his Liberal membership suspended due to his personal conduct at a 2019 Christmas party, which led to him being charged with assault by police. Duluk was found not guilty in the Adelaide Magistrates Court in August 2021, though he remained on the crossbench as an independent.

In February 2021, Fraser Ellis, the Liberal member for Narungga, was charged by the Independent Commissioner Against Corruption (ICAC) with 23 counts of deception, relating to 78 fraudulent claims over the alleged misuse of a travel allowance totalling more than $18,000. The ICAC charges led to Ellis resigning from the Liberal Party and moving to the crossbench as an independent, which officially reduced the Liberals into a minority government. Later that year, Dan Cregan, the Liberal member for Kavel, resigned from the party to sit as an independent, citing the government's failure to manage population growth in the Adelaide Hills. Several days after his resignation from the party, Cregan was elected as Speaker of the House of Assembly after a ballot, as the government's preferred candidate lacked sufficient support in the Assembly.

Though in minority, the government did not fall, as it never lost a vote on confidence or supply; in any event, Ellis and other independents had stated they would support the Marshall government on such matters.

=== Legislative Council ===
After the 2018 election, the numbers in the Legislative Council were 8 Liberal, 8 Labor, 2 SA Best, 2 Greens, 1 Conservative and 1 Advance SA. Conservative MLC Dennis Hood, who had been elected as a Family First MLC in 2014, defected to the Liberals nine days after the 2018 state election. In 2020, John Dawkins was expelled from the Liberal Party for breaking party rules by nominating himself for President of the Legislative Council. The 22 seat upper house composition before the 2022 election was therefore 8 Liberal, 8 Labor, 2 SA Best, 2 Greens, 1 Advance SA, and 1 independent.

Of these members: 4 Liberal, 4 Labor, 2 SA Best and 1 Green have terms which continue until 2026; and 4 Liberal, 4 Labor, 1 Green, 1 Advance SA and 1 independent were up for re-election in 2022, though the independent Dawkins did not contest the election.

=== Campaign ===
Labor campaigned extensively on improving the state's healthcare infrastructure by 'fixing the ramping crisis', pledging to increase the amount of ambulances, hospital beds, nurses and doctors in order to combat long-standing overcrowding of hospitals and ramping of ambulances.

As part of an effort to secure the electoral district of Kavel, Labor also promised to build a new hospital in Mount Barker. The MP for Kavel, Dan Cregan, had resigned from the Liberals in October 2021 to become an independent, citing insufficient government investment in the district; among Cregan's demands included the construction of a new hospital.

The Australian Christian Lobby campaigned for SA election candidates who opposed late-term abortions and who promote more socially conservative policies.

Pauline Hanson's One Nation ran in its first South Australian election since 2006. The newly formed Family First Party (which is different from the previous Family First Party), the Australian Family Party and Sustainable Australia ran for the first time as well.

== Registered parties ==
Parties registered with the Electoral Commission of South Australia.

- Liberal Party of Australia (South Australian Division)
- Australian Labor Party (SA Branch)
- Greens South Australia
- SA Best
- Advance SA
- National Party of Australia (SA)
- Child Protection Party
- Animal Justice Party
- Pauline Hanson's One Nation
- Australian Family Party
- Family First Party Inc
- Real Change SA
- Legalise Cannabis South Australia Party
- Liberal Democratic Party
- SA Party – Stop Overdevelopment & Corruption

== Polling ==
=== Voting intention ===
Primary vote opinion polling for the 2022 South Australian state election with a local regression (LOESS) trendline for each party.

Two-party-preferred opinion polling for the 2022 South Australian state election with a local regression (LOESS) trendline for each party.

House of Assembly (lower house) polling
Date	Firm	Primary vote					2PP vote
		LIB	ALP	BST	GRN	OTH	LIB	ALP
19 Mar 2022 election		35.7%	40%	0.2%	9.1%	15%	45.4%	54.6%
11–17 Mar 2022	Newspoll	38%	41%	–	9%	12%	46%	54%
7–13 Mar 2022	YouGov	33%	41%	–	11%	15%	44%	56%
18–24 Feb 2022	Newspoll	37%	39%	–	10%	14%	47%	53%
1–14 Feb 2022	Dynata	35%	37%	4%	7%	17%	49%	51%
15–29 Jul 2021	Dynata	38%	34%	5%	10%	12%	51%	49%
24 Feb – 1 Mar 2021	YouGov	43%	36%	6%	10%	5%	51%	49%
10–16 Sep 2020	YouGov	46%	35%	5%	10%	4%	53%	47%
6–11 Mar 2020	YouGov	39%	38%	7%	11%	5%	47%	53%
12–14 Mar 2019	YouGov–Galaxy	42%	37%	7%	7%	10%	52%	48%
17 Mar 2018 election		38%	32.8%	14.2%	6.7%	8.4%	51.9%	48.1%
13–15 Mar 2018	Newspoll	34%	31%	17%	8%	10%	–	–

Legislative Council (upper house) polling
Date	Firm	Primary vote
		LIB	ALP	GRN	BST	ONP	ASA	OTH
1–14 Feb 2022	Dynata	33%	33%	9%	5%	5%	1%	13%
15–29 Jul 2021	Dynata	36%	32%	9%	6%	6%	1%	10%

=== Preferred premier and satisfaction polling ===
Preferred premier opinion polling for the 2022 South Australian state election with a local regression (LOESS) trendline for each party.

Date	Firm	Better Premier		Satisfied	Dissatisfied	Satisfied	Dissatisfied
		Marshall	Malinauskas	Marshall		Malinauskas
11–17 Mar 2022	Newspoll	41%	44%	47%	46%	54%	30%
7–13 Mar 2022	YouGov	40%	45%	46%	48%	51%	32%
18–24 Feb 2022	Newspoll	39%	46%	48%	47%	51%	31%
24 Feb – 1 Mar 2021	YouGov	50%	30%	60%	–	46%	–
10–16 Sep 2020	YouGov	54%	26%	68%	16%	44%	22%
6–11 Mar 2020	YouGov	38%	36%	37%	41%	44%	26%
12–14 Mar 2019	YouGov–Galaxy	46%	26%	–	–	–	–
17 Mar 2018 election
		Marshall	Weatherill	Marshall		Weatherill
13–15 Mar 2018	Newspoll	33%	38%	30%	50%	33%	53%
^ Remainder were "uncommitted" to either leader.

== Redistribution and pre-redistribution pendulum ==
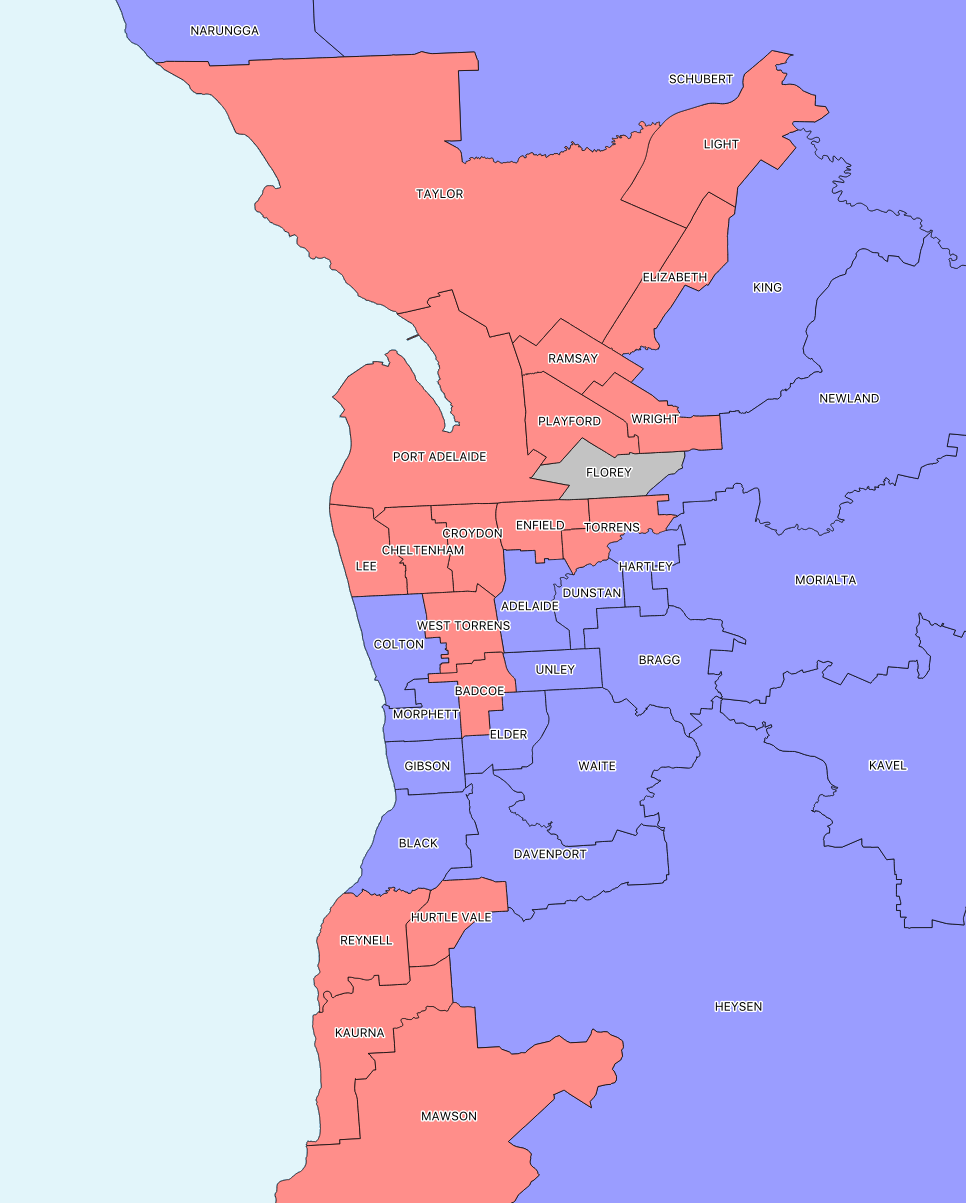
Metropolitan seats

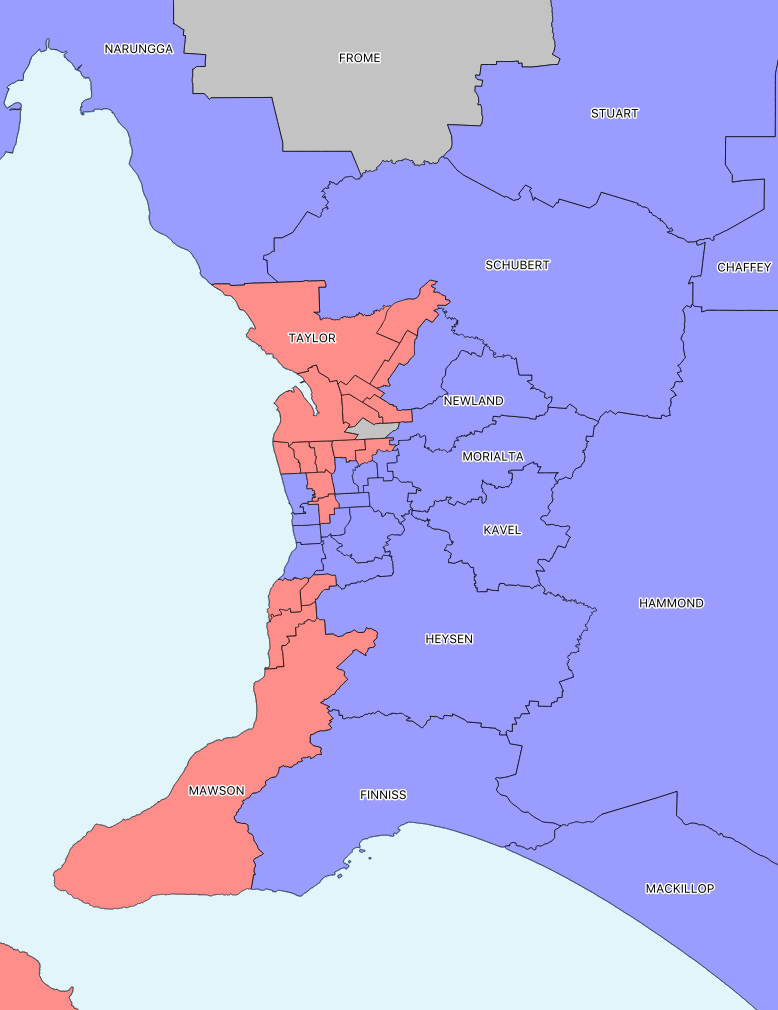
Inner-rural seats

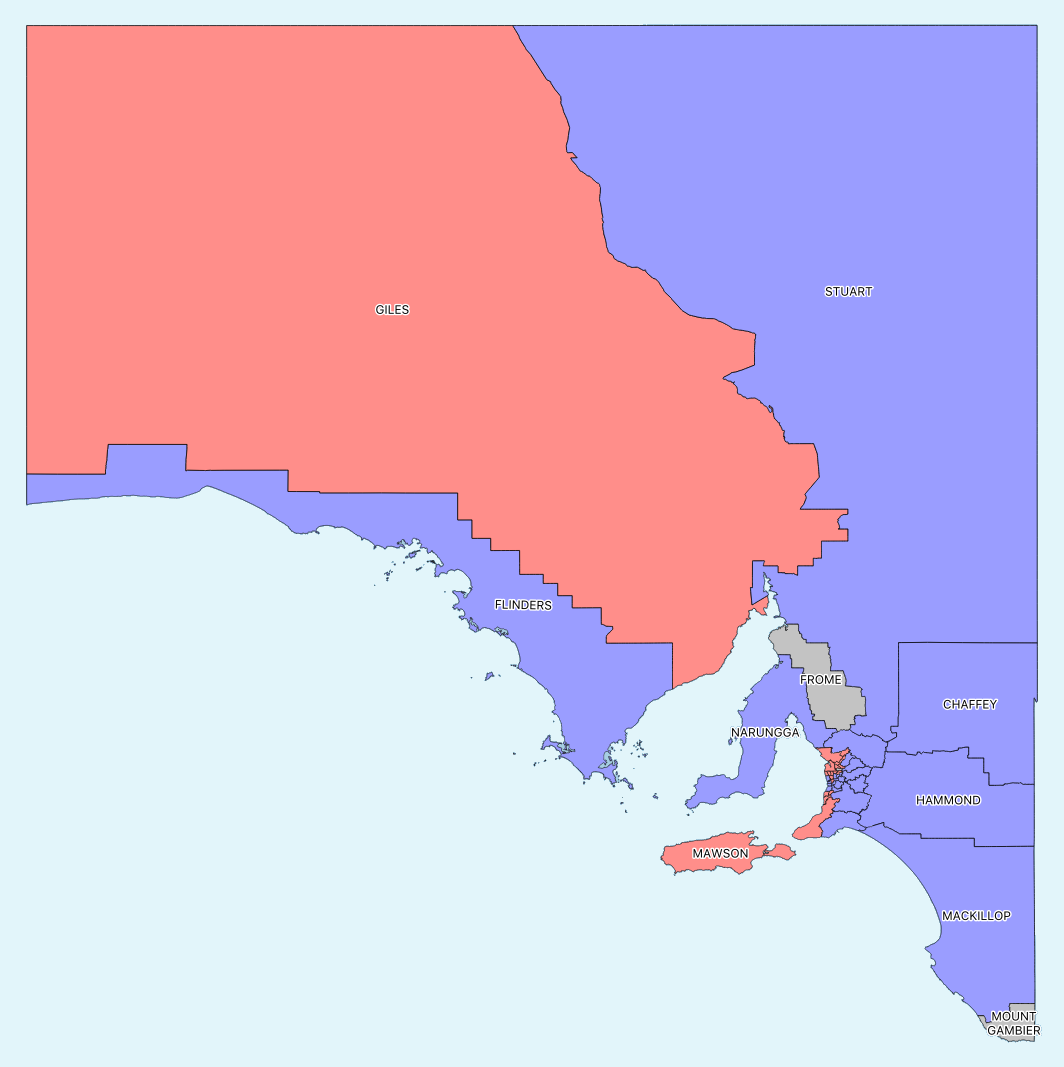
Outer-rural seats

To produce "fair" electoral boundaries, the Electoral Commission of South Australia (ECSA) has been required following the 1989 election to redraw boundaries after each election through a "fairness clause" in the state constitution, with the objective that the party which receives over 50 percent of the statewide two-party vote at the forthcoming election should win the two-party vote in a majority of seats in terms of the two-party-preferred vote calculated in all seats regardless of any differing two-candidate-preferred vote. As it was interpreted from 1991 to 2016, the Electoral Districts Boundaries Commission (EDBC) drew boundaries to try and ensure that the party winning the majority of the state-wide two-party preferred vote would also win a majority of the seats in the House of Assembly; however, the Weatherill government repealed the fairness provision in 2017 so that it was no longer the second criteria for redistributions after equality.

Yet the 2020 redistribution showed that the fairness criteria has not been removed from South Australian redistributions. The EDBC ruled that it could still consider fairness under a general provision that permits the Commission to "have regard to any other matters it thinks relevant". Having been legislatively required in the past, fairness will continue to be allowed as a matter for consideration in the future.

The Electoral Districts Boundaries Commission released a new draft redistribution in August 2020, as calculated from the 27 Liberal−20 Labor seat count by two-party vote as recorded in all 47 seats at the 2014 state election. The net change proposed retained a 27 Liberal−20 Labor notional seat count on a TPP basis when not considering elected independents.

The pendulum below shows the post-redistribution margins, in percentage points, calculated by ABC’s Antony Green, taking into account seats held by independents who are contesting their current seats at the next election, which differ somewhat to the margins calculated by the South Australian Electoral Districts Boundaries Commission that does not take into account currently elected independents. The EDBC is the only redistribution authority in Australia that is required to examine voting patterns in drawing electoral boundaries, and in doing so, assume that the proportion of each party's vote in the declaration vote (postal, pre-poll and absent votes) is evenly distributed across the whole of each former electorate. Antony Green's margin estimates are more accurately calculated using declaration votes from the redistributed polling booths.

Retiring members are shown in italic text.

Liberal seats (23)
Marginal
Newland	Richard Harvey	LIB	0.1
King	Paula Luethen	LIB	0.6
Adelaide	Rachel Sanderson	LIB	1.0
Elder	Carolyn Power	LIB	1.9
Fairly safe
Colton	Matt Cowdrey	LIB	6.2
Hartley	Vincent Tarzia	LIB	6.6
Dunstan	Steven Marshall	LIB	7.5
Heysen	Josh Teague	LIB	7.6
Davenport	Steve Murray	LIB	8.2
Black	David Speirs	LIB	9.2
Morialta	John Gardner	LIB	9.4
Safe
Gibson	Corey Wingard	LIB	10.0
Morphett	Stephen Patterson	LIB	11.0
Unley	David Pisoni	LIB	11.5
Stuart	Dan van Holst Pellekaan	LIB	11.7
Finniss	David Basham	LIB	14.5
Schubert	Stephan Knoll	LIB	15.6
Hammond	Adrian Pederick	LIB	16.9
Bragg	Vickie Chapman	LIB	16.9
Chaffey	Tim Whetstone	LIB	18.0
Frome	Geoff Brock (IND) (Note: Geoff Brock would contest Stuart at the election.)	LIB	18.1
Very safe
MacKillop	Nick McBride	LIB	25.2
Flinders	Peter Treloar	LIB	26.1

Labor seats (20)
Marginal
Mawson	Leon Bignell	ALP	0.7
Wright	Blair Boyer	ALP	3.1
Badcoe	Jayne Stinson	ALP	4.8
Lee	Stephen Mullighan	ALP	5.3
Torrens	Dana Wortley	ALP	5.7
Fairly safe
Enfield	Andrea Michaels	ALP	6.2
Hurtle Vale	Nat Cook	ALP	8.3
Light	Tony Piccolo	ALP	8.4
Reynell	Katrine Hildyard	ALP	9.5
Safe
Taylor	Jon Gee	ALP	11.9
Florey	Frances Bedford (IND) (Note: Frances Bedford would contest Newland at the election.)	ALP	13.5
West Torrens	Tom Koutsantonis	ALP	14.2
Giles	Eddie Hughes	ALP	14.9
Kaurna	Chris Picton	ALP	16.0
Cheltenham	Joe Szakacs	ALP	16.7
Port Adelaide	Susan Close	ALP	16.8
Elizabeth	Lee Odenwalder	ALP	17.2
Ramsay	Zoe Bettison	ALP	18.5
Playford	Michael Brown	ALP	19.0
Very safe
Croydon	Peter Malinauskas	ALP	23.3
Independent seats (4)
Waite	Sam Duluk (Note: Elected as a Liberal, but became an independent during the term.)	IND	7.4 LIB v ALP
Mt Gambier	Troy Bell	IND	10.3 v LIB
Kavel	Dan Cregan	IND	14.5 LIB v ALP
Narungga	Fraser Ellis	IND	18.2 LIB v ALP

Members of the South Australian Legislative Council, 2018–2022
Liberal (8)	Labor (8)	SA Best (2)	Greens SA (2)	Advance SA (1)	Independent (1)
elected 2018: Stephen Wade; Terry Stephens; Jing Lee; Heidi Girolamo ^^ Appointed to replace resigning David Ridgway in 2021	elected 2018: Emily Bourke; Justin Hanson; Irene Pnevmatikos; Clare Scriven	elected 2018: Connie Bonaros; Frank Pangallo	elected 2018: Tammy Franks
elected 2014: Rob Lucas; Michelle Lensink; Nicola Centofanti ^^ Appointed to replace resigning Andrew McLachlan in 2020; Dennis Hood ^^ defected from AC/FFP after 2018 election	elected 2014: Russell Wortley; Ian Hunter; Tung Ngo; Kyam Maher		elected 2014: Robert Simms ^^ Appointed to replace resigning Mark Parnell in 2021	elected 2014: John Darley	elected 2014: John Dawkins ^^ expelled from the Liberal Party in 2020

== Date ==
The last state election was held on 17 March 2018 to elect members for the House of Assembly and half of the members in the Legislative Council. In South Australia, section 28 of the Constitution Act 1934, as amended in 2001, directs that parliaments have fixed four-year terms, and elections must be held on the third Saturday in March every four years unless this date falls the day after Good Friday, occurs within the same month as a Commonwealth election, or the conduct of the election could be adversely affected by a state disaster. Section 28 also states that the Governor may also dissolve the Assembly and call an election for an earlier date if the government has lost the confidence of the Assembly or a bill of special importance has been rejected by the Legislative Council. Section 41 states that both the Council and the Assembly may also be dissolved simultaneously if a deadlock occurs between them. As none of these possibilities eventuated, the election was held on its proper date of 19 March 2022.

The Electoral (Miscellaneous) Amendment Act 2013 introduced set dates for writs for general elections in South Australia. The writ sets the dates for the close of the electoral roll and the close of nominations for an election. The Electoral Act 1985 requires that, for a general election, the writ be issued 28 days before the date fixed for polling (S47(2a)) and the electoral roll be closed at 12 noon, 6 days after the issue of the writ (S48(3(a)(i)). The close of nominations will be at 12 noon 3 days after the close of rolls (Electoral Act 1985 S48(4)(a) and S4(1)).

== Results ==
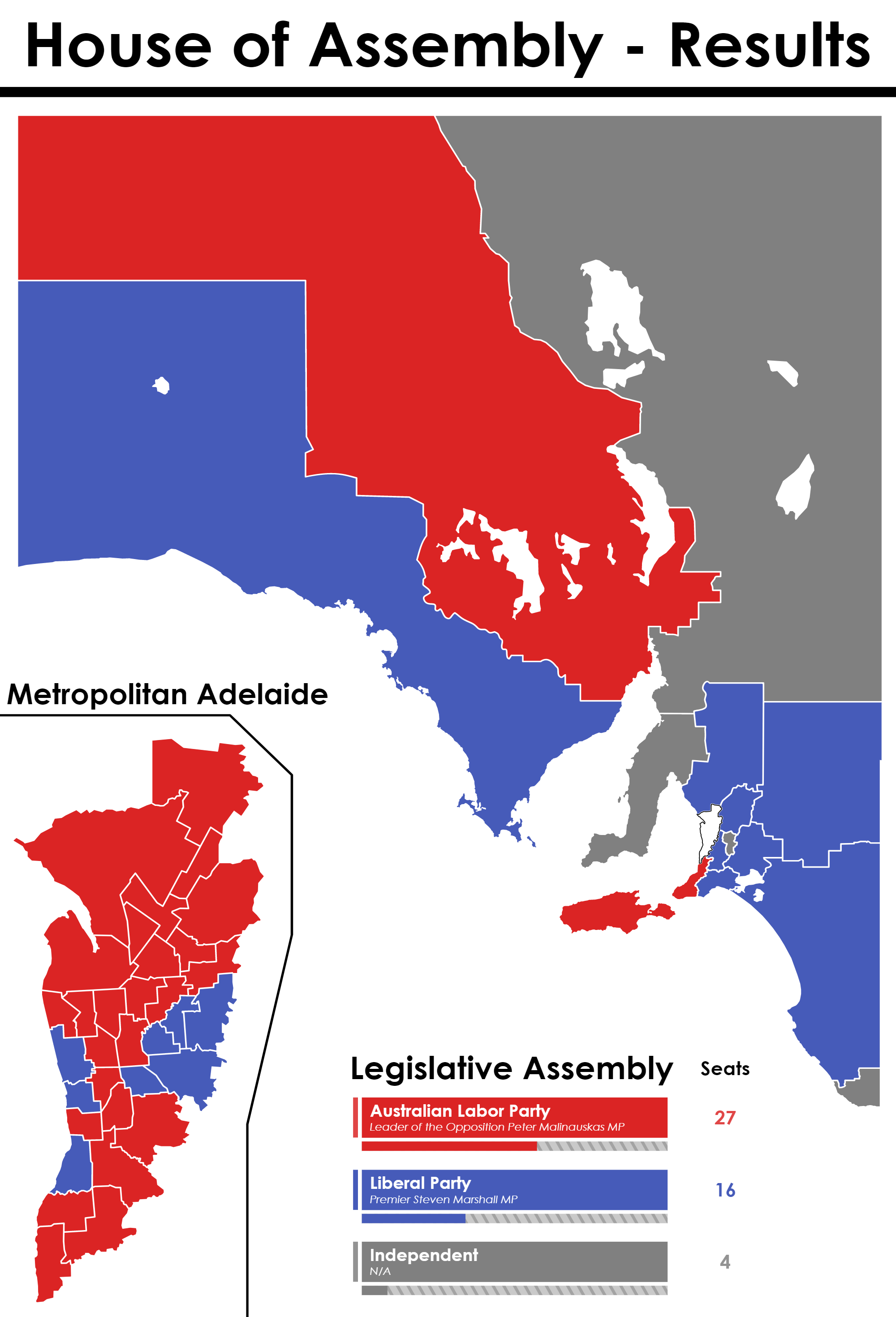
Winning party by electorate.

=== House of Assembly ===
Arrangement of the House of Assembly after the 2022 state election.

South Australian state election, 19 March 2022 House of Assembly << 2018–2026 >>
Enrolled voters	1,266,719				
Votes cast	1,127,642		Turnout	89.02	▼ –2.92
Informal votes	36,469		Informal	3.23	▼ –0.87
Summary of votes by party
Party	Primary votes	%	Swing	Seats	Change
Labor	436,134	39.97	▲ +7.18	27	▲ +8
Liberal	389,218	35.67	▼ –2.30	16	▼ –9
Greens	99,534	9.12	▲ +2.46	0	0
Independents	79,144	7.25	▲ +3.75	4	▲ +1
Family First	40,011	3.67	New	0	0
One Nation	28,664	2.63	New	0	0
Animal Justice	6,107	0.56	▲ +0.25	0	0
National	5,279	0.48	New	0	0
Australian Family	3,043	0.28	New	0	0
SA Best	2,171	0.20	▼ –13.95	0	0
Real Change	1,138	0.10	New	0	0
Liberal Democrats	730	0.07	New	0	0
Total	1,091,173			47	
Two-party-preferred
Labor	595,663	54.59	▲ +6.52		
Liberal	495,510	45.41	▼ –6.52		

Popular vote
Labor	39.98%
Liberal	35.66%
Greens	9.12%
Independents	7.26%
Family First	3.66%
One Nation	2.62%
Others	1.69%

Two-party-preferred vote
Labor	54.59%
Liberal	45.41%

Seats
Labor	57.45%
Liberal	34.04%
Independents	8.51%

==== Seats changing hands ====
Seat	Pre-election			Swing	Post-election		
Seat	Party	Member	Margin	Swing	Margin	Member	Party
Adelaide	Liberal	Rachel Sanderson	1.0	7.1	6.2	Lucy Hood	Labor
Davenport	Liberal	Steve Murray	8.1	11.6	3.4	Erin Thompson	Labor
Elder	Liberal	Carolyn Power	2.0	7.5	5.5	Nadia Clancy	Labor
Florey	Independent	Frances Bedford^{2}	6.1	–0.6^{4}	12.8	Michael Brown	Labor
Frome	Independent	Geoff Brock^{3}	8.2	–10.2^{6}	7.9	Penny Pratt	Liberal
Gibson	Liberal	Corey Wingard	10.0	12.4	2.4	Sarah Andrews	Labor
Kavel	Liberal	Dan Cregan^{1}	14.5	40.1^{5}	25.6	Dan Cregan	Independent
King	Liberal	Paula Luethen	0.6	3.7	3.0	Rhiannon Pearce	Labor
Narungga	Liberal	Fraser Ellis^{1}	18.2	26.6^{5}	8.3	Fraser Ellis	Independent
Newland	Liberal	Richard Harvey	0.1	5.5	5.4	Olivia Savvas	Labor
Stuart	Liberal	Dan van Holst Pellekaan	11.6	28.6^{5}	17.1	Geoff Brock^{3}	Independent
Waite	Liberal	Sam Duluk^{7}	7.4	11.4	4.0	Catherine Hutchesson	Labor
^{1} Dan Cregan and Fraser Ellis were elected as Liberal MPs, but both resigned from the party in 2021. The margin given is their margins as Liberal candidates in 2018.^{2} Due to the 2020 redistribution, Frances Bedford contested Newland instead of Florey.^{3} Due to the 2020 redistribution, Geoff Brock contested Stuart instead of Frome.^{4} This is the swing for Labor v Liberal.^{5} This is the swing against the Liberal Party, who held the seat prior to the election.^{6} This is the swing against the Liberal Party for Liberal v Labor.^{7} Sam Duluk was elected as a Liberal MP in 2018, but he resigned from the party in 2019. The margin given is his margin as a Liberal candidate in 2018.

==== Pendulum ====
Labor seats (27)
Marginal
Gibson	Sarah Andrews	ALP	2.5
King	Rhiannon Pearce	ALP	2.9
Davenport	Erin Thompson	ALP	3.4
Waite	Catherine Hutchesson	ALP	4.0
Newland	Olivia Savvas	ALP	5.4
Elder	Nadia Clancy	ALP	5.6
Fairly safe
Adelaide	Lucy Hood	ALP	6.2
Safe
Torrens	Dana Wortley	ALP	10.0
Lee	Stephen Mullighan	ALP	11.2
Wright	Blair Boyer	ALP	11.9
Florey	Michael Brown	ALP	12.8
Mawson	Leon Bignell	ALP	13.8
Enfield	Andrea Michaels	ALP	14.5
Badcoe	Jayne Stinson	ALP	14.8
Hurtle Vale	Nat Cook	ALP	15.5
Playford	John Fulbrook	ALP	16.3
Reynell	Katrine Hildyard	ALP	16.7
West Torrens	Tom Koutsantonis	ALP	18.8
Cheltenham	Joe Szakacs	ALP	19.1
Light	Tony Piccolo	ALP	19.5
Taylor	Nick Champion	ALP	19.7
Ramsay	Zoe Bettison	ALP	19.9
Very safe
Kaurna	Chris Picton	ALP	20.1
Elizabeth	Lee Odenwalder	ALP	20.5
Giles	Eddie Hughes	ALP	21.0
Port Adelaide	Susan Close	ALP	21.8
Croydon	Peter Malinauskas	ALP	24.8

Liberal seats (16)
Marginal
Dunstan	Steven Marshall	LIB	0.5
Finniss	David Basham	LIB	0.7 v IND
Morialta	John Gardner	LIB	1.4
Heysen	Josh Teague	LIB	1.9
Unley	David Pisoni	LIB	2.2
Black	David Speirs	LIB	2.7
Flinders	Sam Telfer	LIB	3.0 v IND
Hartley	Vincent Tarzia	LIB	3.6
Morphett	Stephen Patterson	LIB	4.5
Colton	Matt Cowdrey	LIB	4.8
Hammond	Adrian Pederick	LIB	5.1
Fairly safe
Frome	Penny Pratt	LIB	8.1
Bragg	Vickie Chapman	LIB	8.2
Safe
Schubert	Ashton Hurn	LIB	11.9
Chaffey	Tim Whetstone	LIB	17.2
Very safe
MacKillop	Nick McBride	LIB	22.6
Independent seats (4)
Narungga	Fraser Ellis	IND	8.3 v LIB
Mt Gambier	Troy Bell	IND	13.1 v LIB
Stuart	Geoff Brock	IND	17.1 v LIB
Kavel	Dan Cregan	IND	25.4 v LIB

=== Legislative Council ===
The final result was 5 Labor, 4 Liberal, 1 Green, and 1 One Nation, for a total of 9 Labor government seats, 8 Liberal opposition seats, with 5 crossbenchers — 2 Green, 2 SA Best, and 1 One Nation.

With the Liberal upper house President unexpectedly re-elected to the Presidency, this gives the Labor government nine of 21 seats during votes on the floor, meaning that only an additional two non-government votes are required to pass legislation.

South Australian state election, 19 March 2022 Legislative Council << 2018–2026 >>
Enrolled voters	1,266,719				
Votes cast	1,129,680		Turnout	89.18	▼ –2.94
Informal votes	40,840		Informal	3.62	▼ –0.33
Summary of votes by party
Party	Primary votes	%	Swing	Seats won	Seats held
Labor	402,441	36.96	▲ +8.01	5	9
Liberal	374,289	34.38	▲ +2.14	4	8
Greens	98,324	9.03	▲ +3.17	1	2
One Nation	46,051	4.23	New	1	1
Liberal Democrats	36,445	3.35	▲ +0.88	0	0
Family First	33,342	3.06	New	0	0
Legalise Cannabis	22,731	2.09	New	0	0
Animal Justice	16,299	1.50	▼ –0.67	0	0
Independents	13,937	1.28	▲ +0.84	0	0
SA Best	11,392	1.05	▼ –18.31	0	2
Real Change	9,417	0.86	New	0	0
Australian Family	9,315	0.86	New	0	0
National	7,363	0.68	New	0	0
Sustainable Australia	3,871	0.36	New	0	0
Advance SA	3,623	0.33	▼ –0.07	0	0
Total	1,088,840			11	22

Members of the South Australian Legislative Council
Labor (9)	Liberal (8)	Greens SA (2)	One Nation (1)	SA Best (2)
elected 2022: Kyam Maher; Tung Ngo; Reggie Martin; Ian Hunter; Russell Wortley	elected 2022: Michelle Lensink; Dennis Hood; Nicola Centofanti; Laura Curran	elected 2022: Robert Simms	elected 2022: Sarah Game
elected 2018: Emily Bourke; Justin Hanson; Irene Pnevmatikos; Clare Scriven	elected 2018: David Ridgway; Stephen Wade; Terry Stephens; Jing Lee	elected 2018: Tammy Franks		elected 2018: Connie Bonaros; Frank Pangallo

== Aftermath and reactions ==
ABC News election analyst Antony Green projected that Labor would win a majority at 8:06 PM ACST on 19 March 2022, two hours after the polls closed. This defied a number of suggestions of a hung parliament. Marshall conceded defeat to Malinauskas an hour later.

Labor took seven seats off the Liberals, including two seats that had never been held by Labor before this election, Davenport and Waite. Davenport had been in the hands of the Liberals and their predecessors, the Liberal and Country League, since its creation in 1970. Waite and its predecessor seat, Mitcham, had been held by non-Labor parties or conservative independents since the introduction of single-member seats in 1938. Additionally, the Liberals suffered large swings in previously safe seats such as Bragg, Morphett, and Hammond.

The Liberals were reduced to their smallest presence in the lower house since 2006. This occurred mainly due to the loss of many of the gains they had made in Adelaide four years earlier. The Liberals had won power in 2018 mainly on the strength of winning 16 of Adelaide's 33 seats, their best showing since taking all but nine of the capital's seats in their 1993 landslide. In 2022, all seven of their losses to Labor were in metropolitan seats. Labor had spent all but 16 years since the end of the Playmander in government due to its traditional dominance of Adelaide. South Australia is one of the most centralised states in Australia; Adelaide is home to over three-quarters of the state's population.

To a greater extent than other state capitals, Adelaide is decisive in deciding state election outcomes. Since the end of the Playmander and the introduction of one vote one value legislation in 1975, most elections have seen Labor win most of the metropolitan seats, with most of the Liberal vote locked up in safe rural seats. Even when the Liberals won majorities of the two-party preferred vote in 1989, 2002, 2010 and 2014, Labor clung to or won government because most of the Liberal majority was wasted on massive landslides in their rural heartland.

The 2022 election saw more of the same. All three of the Liberals' safe seats (>10 percent 2PP) were rural, while all but four of their non-safe seats (<10 percent 2PP) and all but three of their marginal seats (<7 percent 2PP) were urban. One of those marginal seats belonged to Marshall, who was nearly defeated in his own seat of Dunstan after suffering a swing of almost seven percent.

On 20 March 2022, Marshall announced he would resign as leader of the Liberals at a later date, but intended to remain the member for Dunstan.

On 21 March 2022 Malinauskas was formally sworn as Premier by the Governor of South Australia, with Susan Close as his deputy.

In April 2022, it was "formally confirmed" that a One Nation member won a seat within the South Australia legislative council (upper house) for the first time in history.

== See also ==
- 2018 South Australian state election
- Members of the South Australian House of Assembly, 2018–2022
- Members of the South Australian Legislative Council, 2018–2022
- Malinauskas ministry
