= Sam Duluk =

Australian politician

Member of the South Australian House of Assembly for Waite
- In office 17 March 2018 – 19 March 2022
- Preceded by: Martin Hamilton-Smith
- Succeeded by: Catherine Hutchesson

Member of the South Australian House of Assembly for Davenport
- In office 31 January 2015 – 17 March 2018
- Preceded by: Iain Evans
- Succeeded by: Steve Murray

Personal details
- Born: Samuel John Duluk Mildura, Victoria
- Party: Independent (since 2020)
- Other political affiliations: Liberal Party (2015–2020)
- Education: University of Adelaide
- Occupation: Accountant

Samuel John Duluk is an Australian former politician. He was a member of the South Australian House of Assembly from 2015 to 2022, representing Davenport until 2018 and then Waite. He was formerly a Liberal, but resigned to sit as an independent in 2020 after allegations of inappropriate behaviour. He ran in the 2022 South Australian state election as an independent but came in third place. Since retiring from the parliament, Duluk has worked as a political lobbyist.

== Early life ==
Duluk was born in the Victorian city of Mildura, and is descended from post-war migrants from Poland. He was raised in Adelaide and educated at Marryatville High School, then graduated with a Bachelor of Commerce (Accounting) from the University of Adelaide, working as an accountant in the banking industry. He was state president of the South Australian Young Liberal Movement.

== Parliament ==
Duluk won Davenport at a 2015 by-election, despite a five percent two-party-preferred swing against him, which turned the historically safe Liberal seat of Davenport in to a marginal one for the first time. After a redistribution transferred most of his constituents to the neighbouring seat of Waite, Duluk opted to contest Waite and won.

== Assault allegations ==
On the first sitting day of 2020, Duluk expressed regret for several alleged instances of inappropriate behaviour at a parliamentary Christmas party in December 2019. The Speaker, Vincent Tarzia, commissioned a private investigator to produce a report into Duluk's conduct, which allegedly included slapping SA Best MLC Connie Bonaros on the backside and making racist and homophobic comments to other MPs. A week later, after police confirmed Duluk had been reported for "basic assault" over the incident concerning Bonaros, the South Australian premier, Steven Marshall, said that Duluk could no longer attend meetings of the Parliamentary Liberal Party. Duluk subsequently announced that he would take leave from parliament and suspend his membership of the party while the matter was under investigation. In April, he was summonsed to appear in the Adelaide Magistrates Court on 6 October 2020. He apologised in parliament for his behaviour and said he was seeking help in combating an alcohol problem. In October, Duluk's lawyers asked the court for access to a private investigator's report to the speaker of the House of Representatives. The matter returned to court in December 2020 when the new Speaker of the House claimed that the draft report was covered by parliamentary privilege. On 25 August 2021 the court found him not guilty of assault, but magistrate John Wells said he "behaved like a drunken pest" and his behaviour was "entitled, uncouth and disrespectful". He was advised by the magistrate that "Your behaviour towards Ms Bonaros … was rude, unpleasant, insensitive and disrespectful. You owe her an apology." On 8 September 2021 new allegations were raised against Duluk relating to his behaviour at the 2019 Christmas party by Greens MLC Tammy Franks in an address to the legislative assembly. Chief among these were allegations that Duluk had made sexual remarks about numerous women present, as well as homophobic comments directed at a male parliamentary staff member. Additionally, Duluk was accused of remarking that an Indigenous MP was "not a real Aboriginal." On 9 September the following day Duluk announced he would be running as an independent at the upcoming state election.

South Australian House of Assembly
Preceded by Iain Evans	Member for Davenport; 2015–2018	Succeeded by Steve Murray
Preceded by Martin Hamilton-Smith	Member for Waite; 2018–2022	Succeeded by Catherine Hutchesson
