= Electoral district of Davenport =

South Australian state electoral district

Davenport South Australia—House of Assembly
- Interactive map of electoral district boundaries from the 2022 state election (Note: The electorate will have no change in boundaries at the 2026 state election.)
- State: South Australia
- Created: 1970
- MP: Erin Thompson
- Party: Labor
- Namesake: Sir Samuel Davenport
- Electors: 24,794 (2018)
- Area: 57.71 km^{2} (22.3 sq mi)
- Demographic: Metropolitan
- Coordinates: 35°3′27″S 138°36′56″E
Electorates around Davenport:
Gibson	Elder	Waite
Black	Davenport	Waite; Heysen
Hurtle Vale	Heysen	Heysen

Davenport is a single-member electoral district for the South Australian House of Assembly. It is named after nineteenth-century pioneer and politician Sir Samuel Davenport. Davenport is a 57.7 km² electorate covering part of outer suburban Adelaide and the southern foothills of the Adelaide Hills. It takes in the suburbs of Aberfoyle Park, Bedford Park, Bellevue Heights, Chandlers Hill, Cherry Gardens, and Flagstaff Hill; O'Halloran Hill and part of Happy Valley.

Davenport consists mostly of a series of suburbs which have been historically safe for conservative parties since its creation at the 1969 redistribution. It was initially won by Joyce Steele for the Liberal and Country League. She was succeeded after one term by Dean Brown. Brown, a prominent moderate in the party, represented Davenport for 12 years before being challenged for preselection at the 1985 election by Stan Evans, a member of the conservative wing of the renamed Liberal Party. Evans' former seat of Fisher, previously a comfortably safe Liberal seat, had been made considerably more marginal by the 1983 redistribution. A large slice of Evans' former territory was shifted to Davenport, prompting Evans to challenge Brown. Brown fended off Evans' challenge and retained his preselection, but Evans contested the election as an independent Liberal and defeated Brown, preventing Brown's then-likely ascension to the Liberal leadership after the election. Evans rejoined the parliamentary Liberal Party not long after the 1985 election, and was re-elected at the 1989 election. He retired at the 1993 election, endorsing his son, Iain, for preselection. Iain Evans held Davenport from 1993 until 2014 and was a member of the Olsen and Kerin ministries. He was opposition leader for one year following the Liberal loss at the 2006 election.

At the 2014 election, Evans suffered a 2.8 percent two-party swing against him, and a reduced margin of 8.1 percent, with two-party swings against him of up to 8 percent in some booths, including the historically Liberal-voting booth of Belair which Labor won by three votes. On 6 June 2014 he announced he would stand down from the shadow ministry and parliament within a year and prior to the next election. There was speculation that Evans was asked to delay his resignation and the by-election for a year due to federal Liberal government budget cuts and that there could be a "super Saturday" of by-elections in up to five Liberal-held seats.

Evans resigned from parliament on 30 October 2014. A 2015 Davenport by-election was held on 31 January 2015. Liberal Sam Duluk won the seat despite a five percent two-party swing, turning the historically safe seat of Davenport in to a two-party marginal seat for the first time.

After a redistribution transferred a large block of Davenport constituents to nearby Waite, Duluk opted to transfer to Waite. Steve Murray retained Davenport for the Liberals but was defeated in 2022 by Erin Thompson who won it for Labor for the first time in its history.

== Members for Davenport ==
Member	Party	Term
Joyce Steele	Liberal and Country	1970–1973
Dean Brown	Liberal and Country	1973–1974
Dean Brown	Liberal	1974–1985
Stan Evans	Independent Liberal	1985
Stan Evans	Liberal	1985–1993
Iain Evans	Liberal	1993–2014
Sam Duluk	Liberal	2015–2018
Steve Murray	Liberal	2018–2022
Erin Thompson	Labor	2022–present

== Election results ==
2026 South Australian state election: Davenport
Party	Candidate	Votes	%	±%
Labor	Erin Thompson	5,267	49.9	+9.1
One Nation	Jon Howell	2,031	19.2	+19.2
Greens	John Photakis	1,353	12.8	+3.4
Liberal	Trent Burnard	1,306	12.4	−28.8
Independent	Dan Golding	353	3.3	−5.2
Family First	Mathew Francis	191	1.8	+1.8
Australian Family	Rachel Smith	58	0.6	+0.5
Total formal votes		10,559	96.7	
Informal votes		362	3.3	
Turnout		10,921		
Two-candidate-preferred result
Labor	Erin Thompson	7,005	66.3	+12.9
One Nation	Jonathan Howell	3,554	33.7	+33.7
Labor hold		Swing	+12.9	

Results are not final. Last updated on 22 March at 12:35am ACDT.
