= Steve Murray (politician) =

Australian politician

Member of the South Australian House of Assembly for Davenport
- In office 17 March 2018 – 19 March 2022
- Preceded by: Sam Duluk
- Succeeded by: Erin Thompson

Personal details
- Born: 5 February 1963 (age 63) Ballarat, Victoria, Australia
- Party: Liberal Party of Australia
- Children: 1

Stephen Peter Murray (born 5 February 1963) is an Australian politician who represented the South Australian House of Assembly seat of Davenport for the Liberal Party from the 2018 state election until 2022.

== Early life ==
Murray was born in Ballarat and lived most of his early life in the South Australian town of Mannum on the Murray River. Murray is the oldest of six children born to Peter and Beverley Murray who are of Irish descent.

Murray was educated at Mannum High School before moving to Adelaide to study a Bachelor of Economics at the University of Adelaide, graduating with accounting qualifications.

== Personal life ==
Murray is married and has one daughter, and lives in the Adelaide suburb of Happy Valley.

Murray has served on the executive of the Norwood Basketball Club since 2008 and has served as the club's president.

Murray worked for Ford Australia as an accountant after graduating from Adelaide university. He has also owned and operated several software companies.

Prior to running for the seat of Davenport, Murray was the state president of the Liberal Party of Australia from 2015 to 2017.

South Australian House of Assembly
Preceded by Sam Duluk	Member for Davenport; 2018–2022	Succeeded by Erin Thompson
