= Candidates of the 2026 South Australian state election =

Number of candidates by electoral district. 5 6 7 8 9 10 11 12

The 2026 South Australian state election was held on 21 March 2026 to elect all 47 members of the House of Assembly and 11 of the 22 seats in the Legislative Council.

Nominations for candidates were closed on 2 March 2026. 436 candidates (388 for the House of Assembly and 48 for the Legislative Council) contested the election, up from 291 in 2022, and the most in the state's history. 268 candidates were male, 164 were female and four unspecified.

== Retiring members ==
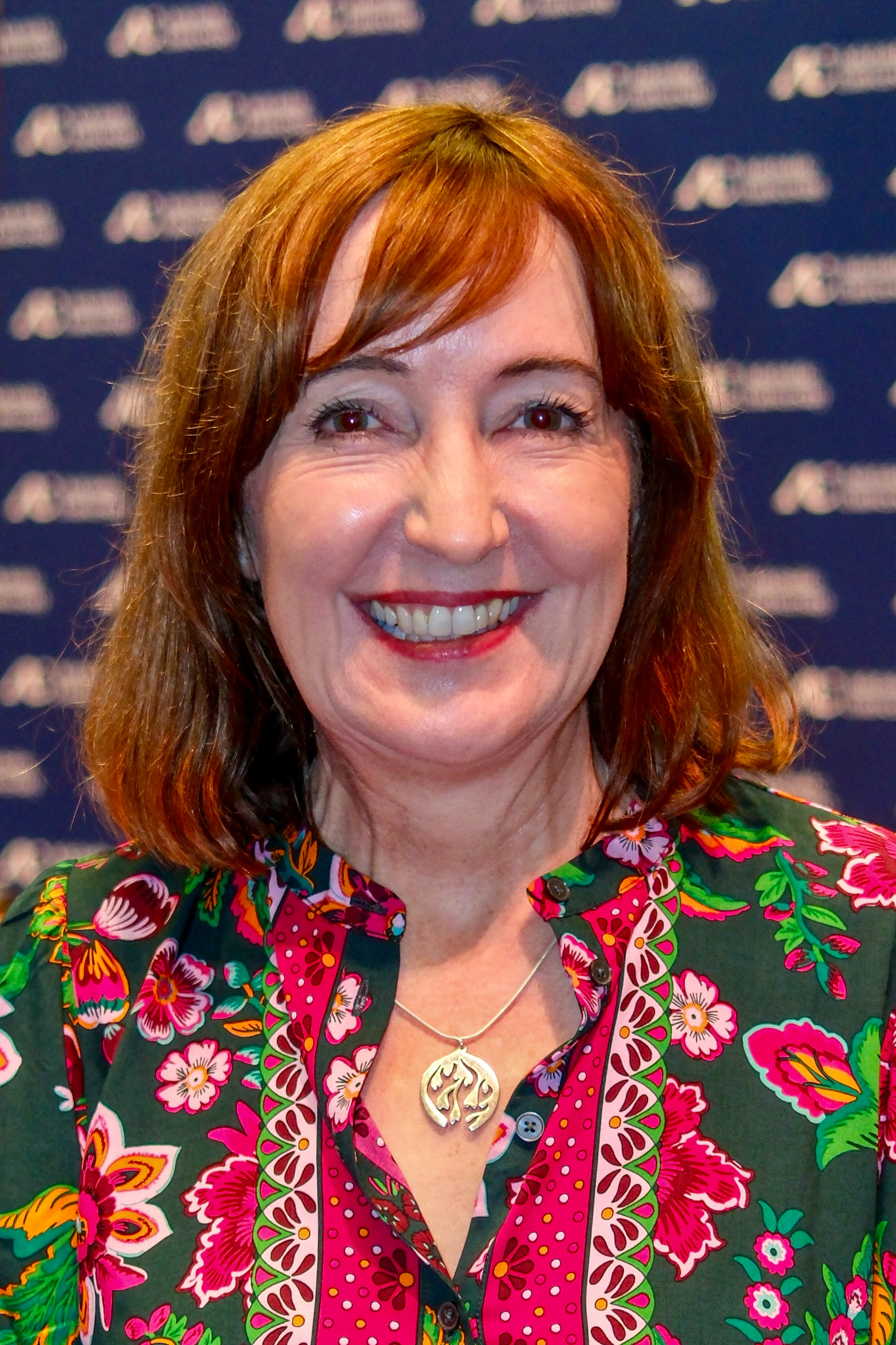
Susan Close; Deputy Premier (2022–2025)

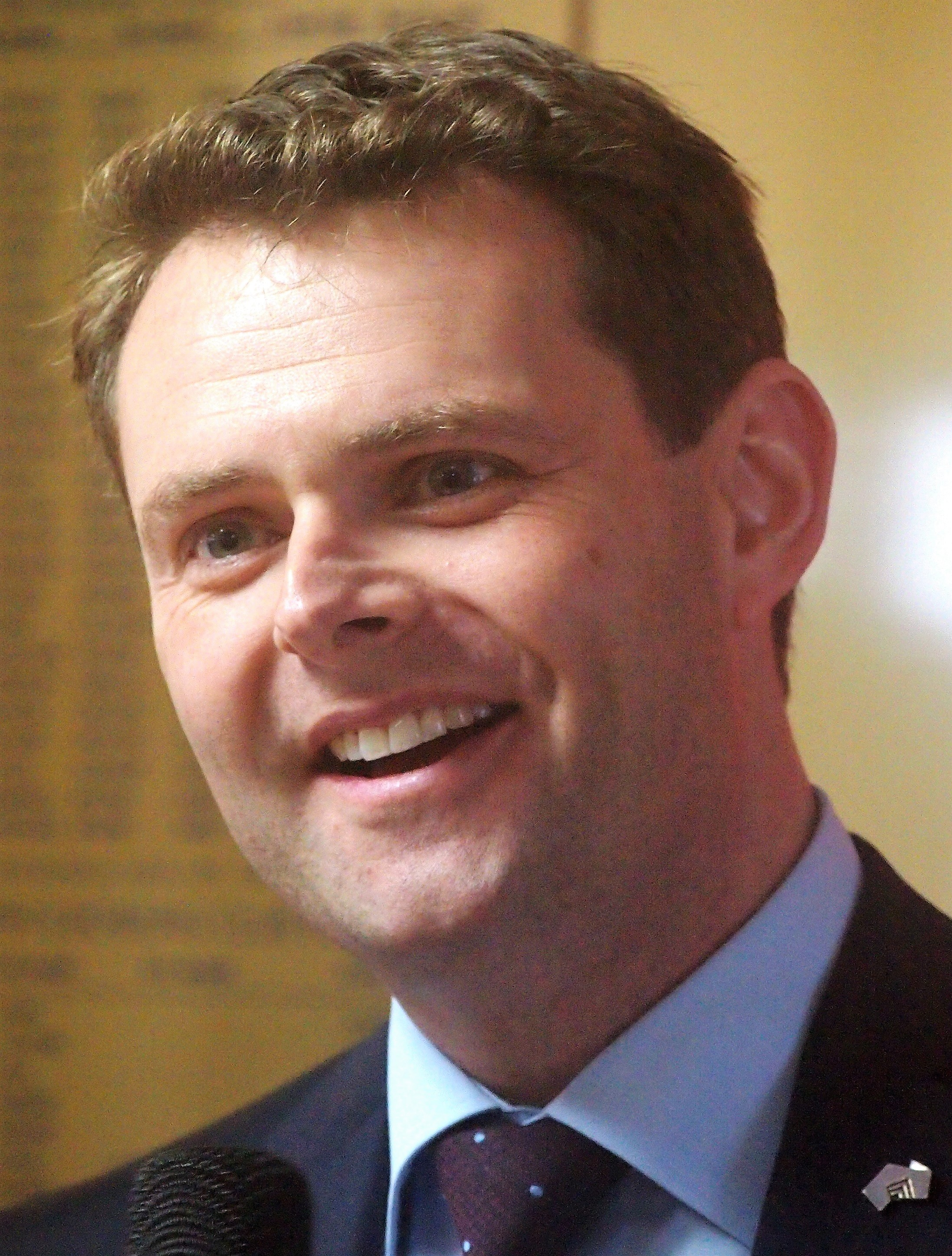
Stephen Mullighan; Treasurer (2022–2025)

=== Labor ===
- Susan Close MP (Port Adelaide) – announced 18 September 2025
- Stephen Mullighan MP (Lee) – announced 18 September 2025
- Lee Odenwalder MP (Elizabeth) – announced 9 October 2025
- Dana Wortley MP (Torrens) – announced 9 October 2025
- Leon Bignell MP (Mawson) – announced 27 November 2025
- Andrea Michaels MP (Enfield) – announced 30 January 2026

=== Liberal ===
- David Pisoni MP (Unley) – announced 8 October 2024
- John Gardner MP (Morialta) – announced 13 December 2024
- Matt Cowdrey MP (Colton) – announced 27 June 2025
- Terry Stephens MLC – announced 23 July 2025

=== Independent ===
- Dan Cregan MP (Kavel) – announced 28 January 2025
- Troy Bell MP (Mount Gambier) – resigned 1 September 2025. Seat left vacant.

== House of Assembly ==
Incumbent members are listed in bold. Successful candidates are highlighted in the relevant colour and marked with an asterisk.

Electorate	Held by	Labor	Liberal	Greens	One Nation	Other
Adelaide	Labor	**Lucy Hood***	Julian Amato	Bronte Colmer	Aoi Baxter	Dan Casey (AFP); Kieran Snape (Ind)
Badcoe	Labor	**Jayne Stinson***	Amar Singh	Josh Andersen-Ward	Daniel Shepherd	Jonathan Attard (AFP); Radosav Jovanovic (FFP)
Black	Labor	**Alex Dighton***	Rhees Bishop	Sarah Luscombe	Paula Wilson	Jethro Attard (AFP); Jennifer Game (FG); David Speirs (Ind); Dianne Squirrell (FFP)
Bragg	Liberal	Rick Sarre	**Jack Batty***	Susan Ditter	Russell Paterson	Robert Walker (AFP)
Chaffey	Liberal	Oscar Harding	**Tim Whetstone***	Alice Kuersch	Jenny Troeth	Imelda Adamson Agars (Nat); Jakob Gamertsfelder (Ind); Jeff Knipe (LC); Tim Oakley (AFP); Jason Perrin (Ind)
Cheltenham	Labor	**Joe Szakacs***	Helen Pike	Steffi Medrow	Melissa Higgins	Karoline Brown (FG); Kosta Hadjimarkou (Ind); John Martin (AFP); Alex Tennikoff (FFP)
Colton	Liberal	Aria Bolkus*	Bec Sutton	Adelaide Xerri	Rocco DeAngelis	Jake Hall-Evans (Ind); Brad Lloyd (RC); Lili Parsons (AJP); Tony Schirripa (AFP); Mathew Schulz (FFP)
Croydon	Labor	**Peter Malinauskas***	Michael Santagata	Ruby Dolling	Dale Blackeby	Ahmed Azhar (Ind) (Note: Endorsed SA Socialists candidate listed as independent due to the party not being registered in time to appear on the ballot.); Daniel Bettinelli (UVA); Joey Elms (AFP); Hieu Pham (FFP); Suzanne Pope (AJP)
Davenport	Labor	**Erin Thompson***	Trent Burnard	John Photakis	Jon Howell	Mathew Francis (FFP); Dan Golding (Ind); Rachel Smith (AFP)
Dunstan	Labor*	**Cressida O'Hanlon***	Anna Finizio	Christel Mex	Victoria Pollifrone	Fiona Leslie (FFP); Ian McBryde (Ind); Miranda Smith (AJP); Ricci Stanley (FG); Nick Zollo (AFP)
Elder	Labor	**Nadia Clancy***	Shane van Groesen	Stef Rozitis	Matt Mangelsdorf	Linda Cheng (FG); Robert Lonie (AFP); Rosanne Walston-Leo (FFP)
Elizabeth	Labor	Ella Shaw*	Dawid Jurczak	David Deex	Kym Hanton	Matthew Field (LC); Sanja Hendrick (FFP); Marco Lorenzi (UVA); Brae McKee (AFP); Angela Rojas (FG)
Enfield	Labor	Lawrence Ben*	Oscar Ong	Chris Siclari	Paul Morrell	Leila Clendon (Ind); Ariah Merrett (AFP); Andrew Riglin (UVA); Daniel Solomon (FFP)
Finniss	Liberal	Phoebe Redington	**David Basham**	Bartholomew Astill-Pearce	Greg Powell	David Abram (AFP); Tanya Hussey (AJP); Bron Lewis (Ind); Lou Nicholson (Ind)*; Michael Scott (FG)
Flinders	Liberal	Ben Anchor	**Sam Telfer***	Kathryn Hardwick-Franco	Brenton Hincks	Dylan Cowley (Nat); Sam Fulwood (AFP); Craig Haslam (Ind); Rod Keogh (Ind); Spiro Manolakis (RC); Thomas McNab (SAB); Meghan Petherick (Ind)
Florey	Labor	**Michael Brown***	Denise George	Alexandra McGee	Riley Size	Frances Bedford (Ind); Dieter Fischer (AFP); Mark Hawke (FFP); Robert Jameson (FG); Trent Wilton (UVA)
Gibson	Labor	**Sarah Andrews***	Jane Fleming	Mike Trewartha	Zoran Ananijev	Darryl Easther (FFP); Bin Liu (AJP); John Lutman (FG); Glenn O'Rourke (AFP)
Giles	Labor	**Eddie Hughes***	Sunny Singh	Alex Taylor	Barry Drage	Gary Balfort (FFP); Jasper Price (AFP)
Hammond	Liberal	Simone Bailey	**Adrian Pederick**	Nicole Palachicky	Robert Roylance*	Ruby Eckermann (AJP); Carmelo Graziano (UVA); Bruce Hicks (AFP); Lucas Hope (Ind); Tristan Iveson (FG); Airlie Keen (Ind); James Murphy (LC); Robert North (FFP)
Hartley	Liberal	Jenn Roberts*	**Vincent Tarzia**	Melanie Searle	David Dwyer	Mara Dottore (RC); Robert Mill (FG); Peter Salerno (UVA); Bruce Smith (AFP); Hugh Thompson (FFP)
Heysen	Liberal	Marisa Bell	**Josh Teague***	Genevieve Dawson-Scott	Tom Kovac	Chris Baker (FFP); Gregory Davis (AJP); Andrew Granger (Ind); Tonya Scott (FG); Craig Wilson (AFP)
Hurtle Vale	Labor	**Nat Cook***	Charlotte Grundy	Tammy Scott	Katrina Emmerson	Jannah Fahiz (AJP); Sarah Kopeikin (FFP); Michael Mitchard (AFP); Jane Savage (LC)
Kaurna	Labor	**Chris Picton***	Shane Carter	Sean Weatherly	Zoe Jones	Patrick Amadio (AFP); Amanda Brohier (FFP); Gary Haddrell (LC); Anastasios Manolakis (RC)
Kavel	Independent	David Leach	Bradley Orr	Sam Tyler	Christiaan Loch	Baden Ashman (AFP); Dayle Baker (FFP); Padma Chaplin (AJP); Ashley Moule (RC); Matt Schultz (Ind)*; David Stone (FG); Jacob van Raalte (Ind)
King	Labor	**Rhiannon Pearce***	Amanda Hendry	Samuel Moore	David Kerrison	Tyla Finlay (FG); Julie Glasgow (FFP); Lukas Gleeson (UVA); Adriana Haynes (RC); Angela Zakarias (AFP)
Lee	Labor	David Wilkins*	Merlindie Fardone	Brett Ferris	Fabio Sturm	Bill Day (AFP); Sarah McGrath (FG); Krystal Schulz (FFP); Vasko Vukoje (RC)
Light	Labor	James Agness*	Andrew Williamson	James Scalzi	Alex Banks	Dan Hale (AFP); Liam Morgan (LC); Jacinta Roberts (FFP)
MacKillop	Independent	Mark Braes	Rebekah Rosser	Catherine Olsson	Jason Virgo*	Joanna Day (AFP); Steven Davies (Ind); Tim Green (LC); **Nick McBride** (Ind); Jonathan Pietzsch (Nat)
Mawson	Labor	Jenni Mitton*	Mike Holden	Lawrence Johnson	Tyler Green	Lesley Gray (LC); Peter Ieraci (AFP); Kelly Schumacher (RC)
Morialta	Liberal	Matthew Marozzi*	Scott Kennedy	Jenn Tranter	Peter Ellery	James Bodycote (AFP); Rosie Cirocco (FFP); Janice Hutchison (RC); Casey Marley-Duncan (FG)
Morphett	Liberal	Toby Priest*	**Stephen Patterson**	Isabella Litt	Tim March	Craig Attard (AFP); Tim Birdseye (RC); Maria Ruta (FG); Ren Ryba (AJP)
Mount Gambier	Vacant	Matthew Key	Lamorna Alexander	Sharon Holmes	Anne-Marie Loef	Kate Amoroso (Ind); Eleanor Day (AFP); Travis Fatchen (Ind)*; Martin Godfrey (LC); Rachael Kenyon (FFP); Cody Scholes (Ind); James Thomson (AJP)
Narungga	Independent	Esther Short	Tania Stock	Jessica Scriven	Chantelle Thomas	John Bennett (FFP); **Fraser Ellis** (Ind); Peter Illingworth (UVA); Nicole Lornie (LC); Joanne Taylerson (RC); Maria Vottari (AFP)
Newland	Labor	**Olivia Savvas***	Sarai Birch	Helen Wright	Alison Dew-Fennell	Abe Lazootin (UVA); Hayley Marley-Duncan (FG); Rachel Mathew (FFP); Colin Stanford (AFP)
Ngadjuri	Liberal	Tony Piccolo	**Penny Pratt**	Danielle Every	David Paton*	Jonathan Jenkins (AFP); Mark Lobban (LC); Shari Olsson (FG); Sharon Pearce (FFP); Cherie Steele (AJP)
Playford	Labor	**John Fulbrook***	Christopher Jones	David Wright	Nickolas Tsentidis	Grace Bawden (UVA); Richard Bunting (AFP); Trent Oehme (LC); Antonio Rangel (FFP)
Port Adelaide	Labor	Cheyne Rich*	Scott Anderson	Hayden Shaw	Joel Hendrie	Claire Boan (Ind); Galina Brunoli (FG); Tom Day (AFP); Gary Johanson (Ind); Sallyann Keen (LC); Aaron Machado (UVA); Anne McMenamin (Ind) (Note: Endorsed Socialist Alliance candidate listed as independent due to the party not being registered in South Australia.); Lucia Snelling (FFP)
Ramsay	Labor	**Zoe Bettison***	Daryl McCann	Luke Skinner	Ralph Chambers	Leo Demitriou (FG); Mark Eckermann (LC); Ashley Gaylor (AFP); Nic Owen (UVA); Luz Velasquez (FFP)
Reynell	Labor	**Katrine Hildyard***	Haseen Zaman	Miya Tait	Peter Heggie	Andy Farmer (FFP); Adnan Krasniqi (LC); Aaron O'Rourke (AFP)
Schubert	Liberal	James Rothe	**Ashton Hurn***	Beverley Morris	Bruce Preece	David Duncan (FG); Alice Shore (AJP); Matt Williams (AFP)
Stuart	Independent	David Ewings	Leon Stephens	Poppy Pilmore	Brandon Turton	**Geoff Brock** (Ind)*; Jessica McKinnon (LC); Stephen Tonkin (AFP)
Taylor	Labor	**Nick Champion***	Ted Boul Hosn	Xander Osborne	Peter Rentoulis	John Attard (AFP); Kylie Evans (FFP); Rita Kuhlmann (AJP); Brett Stephens (LC)
Torrens	Labor	Meagan Spencer*	Haritha Yara	Stella Salvemini	David Medlock	Mervin Joshua (FFP); Malcolm Reynolds (AFP); Bradley Warren (UVA)
Unley	Liberal	Alice Rolls*	Rosalie Rotolo	Dylan Kiernan	Jason Wilkinson	Peter Attard (AFP); Ryan Harrison (Ind); Josip Ivka (AJP); Emma Paterson (RC)
Waite	Labor	**Catherine Hutchesson***	Frank Pangallo	Declan Brumfield	Aaron von Frattner	Alec Gargett (Ind); Ross Pawley (AFP); Mark Ruta (FG)
West Torrens	Labor	**Tom Koutsantonis***	Sarika Sharma	Samuel Bannon	Judith Aldridge	Anna Wamayi (FFP); Mathew Wilson (AFP)
Wright	Labor	**Blair Boyer***	Carston Keong-Woodhouse (Note: Carlton Woodhouse was disendorsed by the Liberal Party on 12 March 2026, over comments he made on an American podcast demonising Islam, feminism, same-sex marriage and "the trans agenda".)	Samantha Skinner	Sean Porter	Robin Hill (AFP); Deb Horley (AJP); Sue Nancarrow (FFP); Rosalind Wilton (UVA)

== Legislative Council ==
Incumbent members are listed in bold. Successful candidates are marked with an asterisk from the highlighted list.

11 of the 22 seats are up for election. The Labor Party and Liberal Party are defending four seats each, Better Community, SA Best, and Tammy Franks (Independent), are each defending one seat. Nicola Centofanti (Liberal), Sarah Game (Fair Go), Laura Henderson (Liberal), Dennis Hood (Liberal), Ian Hunter (Labor), Michelle Lensink (Liberal), Kyam Maher (Labor), Reggie Martin (Labor), Tung Ngo (Labor), Robert Simms (Greens), and Russell Wortley (Labor) are not up for re-election.

Real Change SA	Fair Go for Australians	SA Best	Family First	Animal Justice
1. Stephen Pallaras; 2. Daniel Pallaras	1. Chris McDermott (Note: Chris McDermott quit the Fair Go Party on 11 March 2026, citing irreconcilable differences.); 2. Shannon Foote	1. **Connie Bonaros**; 2. Skye Barrett; 3. Joanna Rowe; 4. John Banelis; 5. Naomi Dewar	1. Deepa Mathew; 2. Christopher Brohier	1. Lionel Pengilley; 2. Geoff Russell
Australian Family	United Voice Australia	Jing Lee - Better Community	Legalise Cannabis SA	Liberal
1. Bob Day; 2. Nicole Hussey; 3. John Day	1. Mark Aldridge; 2. Matilda Bawden	1. **Jing Lee**; 2. Danny Caiazza	1. Jessica Nies; 2. Peter Waters	1. **Ben Hood***; 2. **Heidi Girolamo***; 3. Rowan Mumford; 4. KD Singh; 5. Belinda Crawford-Marshall
Labor	The Greens	The Nationals	One Nation	
1. **Emily Bourke***; 2. **Mira El Dannawi***; 3. **Justin Hanson***; 4. Hilton Gumbys*; 5. **Clare Scriven***; 6. Senthil Chidambaranathan; 7. Awur Deng	1. Melanie Selwood*; 2. Katie McCusker; 3. Christopher Smith	1. Rikki Lambert; 2. Perrin Rennie	1. Cory Bernardi*; 2. Carlos Quaremba*; 3. Rebecca Hewett*; 4. Nathan Skrlj	
Independent (Group O)	Independent (Group P)	Independent (Group Q)		
1. Craig Pickering; 2. Emily Hutchinson	1. **Tammy Franks**; 2. Faith Coleman	1. Darren Phillips		

== Summary by party ==
Party	HA	LC	Total
Australian Labor Party	47	7	54
Liberal Party of Australia	47	5	52
Pauline Hanson's One Nation	47	4	51
Australian Family Party	47	3	50
Australian Greens	47	3	50
Independents and others	33	5	38
Family First Party	35	2	37
Sarah Game Fair Go for Australians	22	2	24
Legalise Cannabis South Australia Party	17	2	19
Animal Justice Party	16	2	18
United Voice Australia Party	14	2	16
Stephen Pallaras Real Change SA	12	2	14
SA Best	1	5	6
National Party of Australia	3	2	5
Jing Lee Better Community	—	2	2
Total	388	48	436

=== Other parties and groups ===
- SA Socialists endorsed candidates for the seats of Croydon (Ahmed Azhar) and Enfield (Leila Clendon). These candidates are listed as independents as the party was not registered in time to appear on ballots.
- Socialist Alliance endorsed a candidate for the seat of Port Adelaide (Anne McMenamin). Since Socialist Alliance is not registered in South Australia, the candidate is listed as an independent.

== See also ==
- Candidates of the 2022 South Australian state election
- Members of the South Australian House of Assembly, 2022–2026
- Members of the South Australian Legislative Council, 2022–2026
- 2026 South Australian House of Assembly election
- 2026 South Australian Legislative Council election
