= Electoral results for the district of Black =

South Australian district election results

This is a list of electoral results for the electoral district of Black in South Australian state elections from the district's first election in 2018 until the present.

== Members for Black ==
Member	Party	Term
David Speirs	Liberal	2018–2024
Alex Dighton	Labor	2024–

== Election results ==
=== Elections in the 2020s ===
==== 2026 ====
2026 South Australian state election: Black
Party	Candidate	Votes	%	±%
Labor	Alex Dighton	7,863	44.1	+6.0
One Nation	Paula Wilson	3,293	18.5	+18.5
Independent	David Speirs	2,535	14.2	+14.2
Greens	Sarah Luscombe	2,146	12.0	+0.2
Liberal	Rhees Bishop	1,662	9.3	−40.8
Family First	Dianne Squirrell	205	1.2	+1.2
Fair Go	Jennifer Game	69	0.4	+0.4
Australian Family	Jethro Attard	51	0.3	+0.3
Total formal votes		17,824	95.8	−1.6
Informal votes		783	4.2	+1.6
Turnout		18,607		
Two-candidate-preferred result
Labor	Alex Dighton	11,729	65.8	+18.5
One Nation	Paula Wilson	6,095	34.2	+34.2
Labor notional gain from Liberal				

Results are not final. Last updated on 23 March at 3:55pm ACDT. Two-candidate-preferred is an estimate by the Australian Broadcasting Corporation.

==== 2024 by-election ====
2024 Black state by-election
Party	Candidate	Votes	%	±%
Labor	Alex Dighton	10,248	47.9	+9.7
Liberal	Amanda Wilson	7,300	34.1	−16.0
Greens	Sarah Luscombe	2,799	13.1	+1.3
Australian Family	Jonathan Parkin	1,069	5.0	+5.0
Total formal votes		21,416	97.7	+0.4
Informal votes		497	2.3	−0.4
Turnout		21,913	82.6	−9.5
Two-candidate-preferred result
Labor	Alex Dighton	12,820	59.9	+12.6
Liberal	Amanda Wilson	8,596	40.1	−12.6
Labor gain from Liberal		Swing	+12.6	

==== 2022 ====
2022 South Australian state election: Black
Party	Candidate	Votes	%	±%
Liberal	David Speirs	11,862	50.1	−0.9
Labor	Alex Dighton	9,037	38.1	+7.0
Greens	Liz Tidemann	2,785	11.8	+5.2
Total formal votes		23,684	97.4	
Informal votes		643	2.6	
Turnout		24,327	92.0	
Two-party-preferred result
Liberal	David Speirs	12,493	52.7	−6.5
Labor	Alex Dighton	11,191	47.3	+6.5
Liberal hold		Swing	−6.5	

Distribution of preferences: Black
Party	Candidate	Votes	Round 1	
Party	Candidate	Votes	Dist.	Total
Quota (50% + 1)		11,843		
Liberal	David Speirs	11,862	+631	12,493
Labor	Alex Dighton	9,037	+2,154	11,191
Greens	Liz Tidemann	2,785	Excluded	

=== Elections in the 2010s ===
==== 2018 ====
2018 South Australian state election: Black
Party	Candidate	Votes	%	±%
Liberal	David Speirs	12,538	50.6	+8.2
Labor	Randall Wilson	7,870	31.7	−3.7
Greens	Dami Barnes	1,702	6.9	−0.8
Independent	Rob De Jonge	1,422	5.7	+5.7
Conservatives	Lionel Zschech	698	2.8	−1.6
Dignity	Anastasia Svetlichny	561	2.3	+2.3
Total formal votes		24,791	96.1	−1.3
Informal votes		1,001	3.9	+1.3
Turnout		25,792	92.5	+0.4
Two-party-preferred result
Liberal	David Speirs	14,546	58.7	+6.4
Labor	Randall Wilson	10,245	41.3	−6.4
Liberal hold		Swing	+6.4	
