= Pre-election pendulum for the 2026 South Australian state election =

Psephological table

The Mackerras pendulum was devised by the Australian psephologist Malcolm Mackerras as a way of predicting the outcome of an election contested between two major parties in a Westminster style lower house legislature such as the South Australian House of Assembly, which is composed of single-member electorates and which uses a preferential voting system such as a Condorcet method or instant-runoff voting.

The pendulum works by lining up all of the seats held in Parliament for the government, the opposition and the crossbenches according to the percentage point margin they are held by on a two party preferred basis. This is also known as the swing required for the seat to change hands. Given a uniform swing to the opposition or government parties, the number of seats that change hands can be predicted.

Classification of seats as marginal, fairly safe or safe is applied by the independent Australian Electoral Commission using the following definition: "Where a winning party receives less than 56% of the vote, the seat is classified as 'marginal', 56–60% is classified as 'fairly safe' and more than 60% is considered 'safe'."

== Pendulum ==
A redistribution, required after each election, was finalised by the South Australian Electoral Districts Boundaries Commission in December 2024. The below post-redistribution pendulum shows all seats by their redistributed notional margin, taking into account by-elections and defections.

Italics indicate that the incumbent member is retiring, switching to another seat or the seat is vacant.

Labor seats (29)
Marginal
Dunstan	Cressida O'Hanlon (Note: Elected at the 2024 Dunstan state by-election following the resignation of Steven Marshall)	ALP	0.8 (Note: Labor gained Dunstan from the Liberal Party by a margin of 0.8% at the 2024 Dunstan state by-election)
Gibson	Sarah Andrews	ALP	2.5
Davenport	Erin Thompson	ALP	3.4
King	Rhiannon Pearce	ALP	4.0
Waite	Catherine Hutchesson	ALP	4.0
Newland	Olivia Savvas	ALP	5.4
Elder	Nadia Clancy	ALP	5.6
Fairly safe
Adelaide	Lucy Hood	ALP	6.2
Black	Alex Dighton (Note: Elected at the 2024 Black state by-election following the resignation of David Speirs)	ALP	9.9 (Note: Labor gained Black from the Liberal Party by a margin of 9.9% at the 2024 Black state by-election)
Safe
Torrens	Dana Wortley	ALP	10.0
Lee	Stephen Mullighan	ALP	11.5
Wright	Blair Boyer	ALP	11.9
Florey	Michael Brown	ALP	12.8
Mawson	Leon Bignell	ALP	13.8
Enfield	Andrea Michaels	ALP	14.5
Badcoe	Jayne Stinson	ALP	14.8
Hurtle Vale	Nat Cook	ALP	15.7
Playford	John Fulbrook	ALP	16.3
Reynell	Katrine Hildyard	ALP	17.2
Taylor	Nick Champion	ALP	18.4
West Torrens	Tom Koutsantonis	ALP	18.8
Cheltenham	Joe Szakacs	ALP	19.1
Giles	Eddie Hughes	ALP	19.7
Kaurna	Chris Picton	ALP	19.8
Ramsay	Zoe Bettison	ALP	19.9
Very safe
Light	Tony Piccolo (Note: Tony Piccolo will contest the seat of Ngadjuri.)	ALP	20.1
Elizabeth	Lee Odenwalder	ALP	21.7
Port Adelaide	Susan Close	ALP	21.8
Croydon	Peter Malinauskas	ALP	24.8

Liberal seats (16)
Marginal
Finniss	David Basham	LIB	0.7 v IND
Morialta	John Gardner	LIB	1.4
Unley	David Pisoni	LIB	2.2
Heysen	Josh Teague	LIB	2.6
Flinders	Sam Telfer	LIB	3.0 v IND
Ngadjuri	Penny Pratt	LIB	3.2
Kavel	Dan Cregan(IND)	LIB	3.5
Hartley	Vincent Tarzia	LIB	3.6
Morphett	Stephen Patterson	LIB	4.5
Colton	Matt Cowdrey	LIB	4.8
Hammond	Adrian Pederick	LIB	5.1
Fairly safe
Bragg	Jack Batty (Note: Elected at the 2022 Bragg state by-election following the resignation of Vickie Chapman)	LIB	8.2 (Note: 8.2% was the Liberal margin at the 2022 state election. The Liberal margin at the 2022 Bragg state by-election was 5.6%.)
Safe
Schubert	Ashton Hurn	LIB	11.9
Mt Gambier	Troy Bell (IND) (Note: Troy Bell formally resigned from Parliament on 1 September 2025, but no by-election was held due to proximity to the general election.)	LIB	13.8
Chaffey	Tim Whetstone	LIB	17.2
Very safe
MacKillop	Nick McBride (IND)	LIB	22.6

Crossbench seats (2)
Narungga	Fraser Ellis	IND	8.1 v LIB
Stuart	Geoff Brock	IND	14.1 v LIB
