= Members of the South Australian House of Assembly, 2022–2026 =

This is a list of members of the South Australian House of Assembly from 2022 to 2026, as elected at the 2022 state election and subsequent by-elections.

Name	Party	Electorate	Term of office
Sarah Andrews	Labor	Gibson	2022–present
David Basham	Liberal	Finniss	2018–2026
Jack Batty^{[1]}	Liberal	Bragg	2022–present
Troy Bell	Independent	Mount Gambier	2014–2025
Zoe Bettison	Labor	Ramsay	2012–present
Leon Bignell	Labor	Mawson	2006–2026
Blair Boyer	Labor	Wright	2018–present
Geoff Brock	Independent	Stuart	2009–present
Michael Brown	Labor	Florey	2018–present
Nick Champion	Labor	Taylor	2022–present
Vickie Chapman^{[1]}	Liberal	Bragg	2002–2022
Nadia Clancy	Labor	Elder	2022–present
Susan Close	Labor	Port Adelaide	2012–2026
Nat Cook	Labor	Hurtle Vale	2014–present
Matt Cowdrey	Liberal	Colton	2018–2026
Dan Cregan	Independent	Kavel	2018–2026
Alex Dighton	Labor	Black	2024–present
Fraser Ellis	Independent	Narungga	2018–2026
John Fulbrook	Labor	Playford	2022–present
John Gardner	Liberal	Morialta	2010–2026
Katrine Hildyard	Labor	Reynell	2014–present
Lucy Hood	Labor	Adelaide	2022–present
Eddie Hughes	Labor	Giles	2014–present
Ashton Hurn	Liberal	Schubert	2022–present
Catherine Hutchesson	Labor	Waite	2022–present
Tom Koutsantonis	Labor	West Torrens	1997–present
Peter Malinauskas	Labor	Croydon	2018–present
Steven Marshall^{[3]}	Liberal	Dunstan	2010–2024
Nick McBride	Liberal/Independent^{[2]}	MacKillop	2018–2026
Andrea Michaels	Labor	Enfield	2019–2026
Stephen Mullighan	Labor	Lee	2014–2026
Lee Odenwalder	Labor	Elizabeth	2010–2026
Cressida O'Hanlon^{[3]}	Labor	Dunstan	2024–present
Stephen Patterson	Liberal	Morphett	2018–2026
Rhiannon Pearce	Labor	King	2022–present
Adrian Pederick	Liberal	Hammond	2006–2026
Tony Piccolo	Labor	Light	2006–2026
Chris Picton	Labor	Kaurna	2014–present
David Pisoni	Liberal	Unley	2006–2026
Penny Pratt	Liberal	Frome	2022–2026
Olivia Savvas	Labor	Newland	2022–present
David Speirs^{[4]}	Liberal	Black	2014–2024
Jayne Stinson	Labor	Badcoe	2018–present
Joe Szakacs	Labor	Cheltenham	2019–present
Vincent Tarzia	Liberal	Hartley	2014–2026
Josh Teague	Liberal	Heysen	2018–present
Sam Telfer	Liberal	Flinders	2022–present
Erin Thompson	Labor	Davenport	2022–present
Tim Whetstone	Liberal	Chaffey	2010–present
Dana Wortley	Labor	Torrens	2014–2026

^{1} On 31 May 2022, Bragg Liberal MP Vickie Chapman resigned. Liberal candidate Jack Batty won the resulting by-election on 2 July.
^{2} On 6 July 2023, MacKillop Liberal MP Nick McBride resigned from the Liberal Party and sits as an independent.
^{3} On 6 February 2024, Dunstan Liberal MP Steven Marshall resigned. The resulting by-election was held on 23 March 2024, and was won by Labor's Cressida O'Hanlon.
^{4} On 15 October 2024, Black Liberal MP David Speirs resigned. The resulting by-election was held on 16 November 2024, with Labor's Alex Dighton projected to win the seat.
^{5} * On 2 September 2025, Mount Gambier Independent MP Troy Bell resigned. No by-election was held and the seat remained vacant.

== See also ==
- Members of the South Australian Legislative Council, 2022–2026
