= Opinion polling for the 2026 South Australian state election =

In the lead-up to the 2026 South Australian state election, a number of polling companies have conducted opinion polls. These polls collect data on parties' primary vote, leaders' favourability, and individual electoral district results.

== Voting intention ==
=== Graphical summary ===
A graph showing the primary vote opinion polling in the lead-up to the 2026 South Australian state election, with LOESS regression.

A graph showing the two-party preferred opinion polling in the lead-up to the 2026 South Australian state election, with LOESS regression.

=== House of Assembly ===
Date	Firm	Sample size	Primary vote						2PP vote		
Date	Firm	Sample size	ALP	LIB	GRN	ONP	IND	OTH	ALP	LIB	ONP
21 Mar 2026	2026 election		37.5%	18.9%	10.4%	22.9%	5.5%	4.8%	55.7%	44.3%	
12–18 Mar 2026	Newspoll	1,048	40%	16%	12%	22%	—N/a	10%	—N/a	—N/a	—N/a
12–18 Mar 2026	DemosAU	1,242	37%	17%	11%	23%	—N/a	12%	—N/a	—N/a	—N/a
9–17 Mar 2026	YouGov	1,265	38%	19%	12%	22%	5%	4%	59%	41%	—N/a
9–17 Mar 2026	YouGov	1,265	38%	19%	12%	22%	5%	4%	59%	—N/a	41%
16 Mar 2026	Resolve	1,112	32%	18%	10%	28%	—N/a	11%	—N/a	—N/a	—N/a
6–16 Mar 2026	Fox & Hedgehog	1,008	38%	18%	11%	21%	—N/a	12%	60%	40%	—N/a
6–16 Mar 2026	Fox & Hedgehog	1,008	38%	18%	11%	21%	—N/a	12%	59%	—N/a	41%
6–16 Mar 2026	Fox & Hedgehog	1,008	38%	18%	11%	21%	—N/a	12%	—N/a	53%	47%
19–23 Feb 2026	Roy Morgan	2,172	35%	16.5%	11%	28%	6.5%	3%	61%	39%	—N/a
19–23 Feb 2026	Roy Morgan	2,172	35%	16.5%	11%	28%	6.5%	3%	59%	—N/a	41%
19–23 Feb 2026	Roy Morgan	2,172	35%	16.5%	11%	28%	6.5%	3%	—N/a	52.5%	47.5%
11–17 Feb 2026	Newspoll	1,057	44%	14%	12%	24%	—N/a	6%	—N/a	—N/a	—N/a
6–17 Feb 2026	YouGov	1,217	37%	20%	13%	22%	6%	2%	59%	41%	—N/a
6–17 Feb 2026	YouGov	1,217	37%	20%	13%	22%	6%	2%	60%	—N/a	40%
31 Jan – 16 Feb 2026	DemosAU	1,070	43%	18%	12%	19%	—N/a	8%	—N/a	—N/a	—N/a
31 Jan – 8 Feb 2026	Fox & Hedgehog	904	40%	19%	12%	20%	—N/a	9%	61%	39%	—N/a
31 Jan – 8 Feb 2026	Fox & Hedgehog	904	40%	19%	12%	20%	—N/a	9%	63%	—N/a	37%
31 Jan – 8 Feb 2026	Fox & Hedgehog	904	40%	19%	12%	20%	—N/a	9%	—N/a	53%	47%
5–8 Dec 2025	Ashton Hurn replaces Vincent Tarzia as Liberal leader and leader of the opposition										
24 Nov – 5 Dec 2025	Fox & Hedgehog	1,000	41%	21%	12%	13%	—N/a	13%	61%	39%	—N/a
6–15 Oct 2025	DemosAU	1,006	47%	21%	13%	—N/a	—N/a	19%	66%	34%	—N/a
15–28 May 2025	YouGov	1,004	48%	21%	14%	7%	—N/a	10%	67%	33%	—N/a
18–23 Feb 2025	DemosAU	903	43%	30%	10%	—N/a	—N/a	17%	59%	41%	—N/a
6–29 Aug 2024	Wolf & Smith	856	41%	28%	11%	5%	—N/a	15% (Note: Including 3% for Family First and 12% for other parties.)	60%	40%	—N/a
12 Aug 2024	Vincent Tarzia becomes Liberal leader and leader of the opposition										
11–20 Sep 2022	Dynata	616	34%	34%	13%	5%	—N/a	14% (Note: Including 6% for SA Best and 8% for other parties.)	53%	47%	—N/a
19 Mar 2022	2022 election		40.0%	35.7%	9.1%	2.6%	7.3%	5.3%	54.6%	45.1%	—

=== Legislative Council ===
Date	Firm	Sample size	Primary vote										
Date	Firm	Sample size	ALP	LIB	GRN	ONP	FFP	LCP	AJP	SAB	RC	AFP	OTH
21 Mar 2026	2026 election		36.7%	17.7%	10.2%	24.4%	2.1%	2.4%	1.3%	0.7%	1.0%	0.5%	3.0%
31 Jan – 16 Feb 2026	DemosAU	1,070	38%	15%	11%	21%	4%	2%	3%	1%	2%	0%	3% (Note: 1% for the Libertarian Party, 1% for Better Community and 1% for Fair Go.)
6–15 Oct 2025	DemosAU	1,006	37%	17%	11%	12%	3%	4%	4%	4%	2%	3%	4% (Note: 2% for the National Party, 1% for Fair Go, 1% for United Voice and 0% for Better Community.)
11–20 Sep 2022	Dynata	616	35%	32%	13%	4%	—N/a	—N/a	—N/a	7%	—N/a	—N/a	9%
19 Mar 2022	2022 election		37.0%	34.4%	9.0%	4.2%	3.1%	2.1%	1.5%	1.0%	0.9%	0.9%	5.9%

== Approval polling ==
=== Leadership approval ===
Date	Firm	Preferred Premier				Malinauskas				Speirs/Tarzia/Hurn			
Date	Firm	Malinauskas	Tarzia/Hurn	Undecided	Net	Satisfied	Dissatisfied	Undecided	Net	Satisfied	Dissatisfied	Undecided	Net
12–18 Mar 2026	DemosAU	56%	21%	23%	35%	49%	20%	31%	+29%	21%	21%	58%	±0%
6–16 Mar 2026	Fox & Hedgehog	55%	22%	23%	33%	52%	19%	26%	+33%	25%	15%	36%	+10%
11–17 Feb 2026	Newspoll	64%	20%	16%	44%	64%	28%	8%	+36%	55%	33%	12%	+22%
6–17 Feb 2026	YouGov	67%	19%	14%	48%	67%	27%	6%	+40%	39%	35%	26%	+4%
31 Jan – 16 Feb 2026	DemosAU	56%	22%	22%	34%	51%	18%	31%	+33%	24%	26%	50%	–2%
31 Jan – 8 Feb 2026	Fox & Hedgehog	54%	22%	24%	32%	52%	21%	22%	+31%	20%	13%	37%	+7%
5–8 Dec 2025	Ashton Hurn replaces Vincent Tarzia as Liberal leader and leader of the opposition												
24 Nov – 5 Dec 2025	Fox & Hedgehog	54%	18%	28%	36%	51%	19%	25%	+32%	17%	25%	36%	–8%
6–15 Oct 2025	DemosAU	58%	19%	23%	39%	—N/a	—N/a	—N/a	—N/a	—N/a	—N/a	—N/a	—N/a
15–28 May 2025	YouGov	72%	14%	14%	58%	70%	18%	12%	+52%	22%	31%	47%	–9%
18–23 Feb 2025	DemosAU	51%	23%	26%	28%	—N/a	—N/a	—N/a	—N/a	—N/a	—N/a	—N/a	—N/a
12 Aug 2024	Vincent Tarzia becomes Liberal leader and leader of the opposition												
11–20 Sep 2022	Dynata	—N/a	—N/a	—N/a	—N/a	74%	13%	13%	+61%	51%	19%	30%	+32%

=== Party approval ===
Date	Firm	Sample size	Labor			Liberal			One Nation			Family First		
Date	Firm	Sample size	Pos.	Neg.	Net	Pos.	Neg.	Net	Pos.	Neg.	Net	Pos.	Neg.	Net
6–16 March 2026	Fox & Hedgehog	1,008	43%	25%	+18%	23%	36%	–13%	40%	31%	+9%	—N/a	—N/a	—N/a
31 Jan – 8 Feb 2026	Fox & Hedgehog	904	45%	28%	+17%	25%	37%	–12%	36%	30%	+6%	—N/a	—N/a	—N/a
24 Nov – 5 Dec 2025	Fox & Hedgehog	1,000	43%	27%	+16%	25%	36%	–11%	33%	33%	0%	26%	24%	+2%

== Sub-state polling ==
=== Inner Adelaide ===
Date	Firm	Sample size	Primary vote						2PP vote		
Date	Firm	Sample size	ALP	LIB	GRN	ONP	IND	OTH	ALP	LIB	ONP
12–18 Mar 2026	DemosAU	—N/a	44%	19%	13%	15%	—N/a	9%	—N/a	—N/a	—N/a
31 Jan – 8 Feb 2026	Fox & Hedgehog	—N/a	44%	17%	14%	17%	—N/a	8%	65%	35%	—N/a
31 Jan – 8 Feb 2026	Fox & Hedgehog	—N/a	44%	17%	14%	17%	—N/a	8%	67%	—N/a	33%
31 Jan – 8 Feb 2026	Fox & Hedgehog	—N/a	44%	17%	14%	17%	—N/a	8%	—N/a	54%	46%
24 Nov – 5 Dec 2025	Fox & Hedgehog	—N/a	51%	18%	9%	11%	—N/a	11%	67%	33%	—N/a

=== Outer Adelaide ===
Date	Firm	Sample size	Primary vote						2PP vote		
Date	Firm	Sample size	ALP	LIB	GRN	ONP	IND	OTH	ALP	LIB	ONP
12–18 Mar 2026	DemosAU	—N/a	38%	15%	10%	24%	—N/a	13%	—N/a	—N/a	—N/a
31 Jan – 8 Feb 2026	Fox & Hedgehog	—N/a	46%	17%	12%	18%	—N/a	7%	66%	34%	—N/a
31 Jan – 8 Feb 2026	Fox & Hedgehog	—N/a	46%	17%	12%	18%	—N/a	7%	67%	—N/a	33%
31 Jan – 8 Feb 2026	Fox & Hedgehog	—N/a	46%	17%	12%	18%	—N/a	7%	—N/a	53%	47%
24 Nov – 5 Dec 2025	Fox & Hedgehog	—N/a	38%	22%	12%	16%	—N/a	12%	58%	42%	—N/a

=== Adelaide ===
Date	Firm	Sample size	Primary vote						2PP vote		
Date	Firm	Sample size	ALP	LIB	GRN	ONP	IND	OTH	ALP	LIB	ONP
19–23 Feb 2026	Roy Morgan	—N/a	37.5%	15%	14%	25.5%	5%	3%	65.5%	34.5%	—N/a
19–23 Feb 2026	Roy Morgan	—N/a	37.5%	15%	14%	25.5%	5%	3%	63.5%	—N/a	36.5%
19–23 Feb 2026	Roy Morgan	—N/a	37.5%	15%	14%	25.5%	5%	3%	—N/a	54%	46%

=== Regional South Australia ===
Date	Firm	Sample size	Primary vote						2PP vote		
Date	Firm	Sample size	ALP	LIB	GRN	ONP	IND	OTH	ALP	LIB	ONP
12–18 Mar 2026	DemosAU	—N/a	23%	15%	9%	39%	—N/a	14%	—N/a	—N/a	—N/a
19–23 Feb 2026	Roy Morgan	—N/a	29%	19%	4.5%	33.5%	10%	4%	48.5%	51.5%	—N/a
19–23 Feb 2026	Roy Morgan	—N/a	29%	19%	4.5%	33.5%	10%	4%	47%	—N/a	53%
19–23 Feb 2026	Roy Morgan	—N/a	29%	19%	4.5%	33.5%	10%	4%	—N/a	48%	52%
31 Jan – 8 Feb 2026	Fox & Hedgehog	—N/a	29%	24%	9%	26%	—N/a	12%	51%	49%	—N/a
31 Jan – 8 Feb 2026	Fox & Hedgehog	—N/a	29%	24%	9%	26%	—N/a	12%	52%	—N/a	48%
31 Jan – 8 Feb 2026	Fox & Hedgehog	—N/a	29%	24%	9%	26%	—N/a	12%	—N/a	52%	48%
24 Nov – 5 Dec 2025	Fox & Hedgehog	—N/a	33%	24%	15%	14%	—N/a	14%	56%	44%	—N/a

== Individual seat polling ==
=== Mount Gambier ===
Date	Firm	Sample size	Primary vote								2CP vote		
Date	Firm	Sample size	Fatchen (IND)	LIB	ALP	ONP	GRN	FFP	Scholes (IND)	OTH	Fatchen (IND)	LIB	Bell (IND)
19 Jan 2026	uComms	300	23.1%	12.1%	17.7%	10.8%	5.0%	—N/a	7.7%	23.7% (Note: Including undecided.)	61.7%	38.3%	—N/a
19 Mar 2022	2022 election		—	29.0%	20.6%	—	—	4.7%	—	45.7%	—	36.9%	63.1%
