= 2026 South Australian state election =

Election of South Australia's 56th parliament

- 21 March 2026

All 47 seats in the House of Assembly 24 seats needed for a majority 11 of 22 seats in the Legislative Council
- Opinion polls
- Registered: 1,317,186
- Turnout: 1,167,715 (88.7%, ▼0.5 pp)
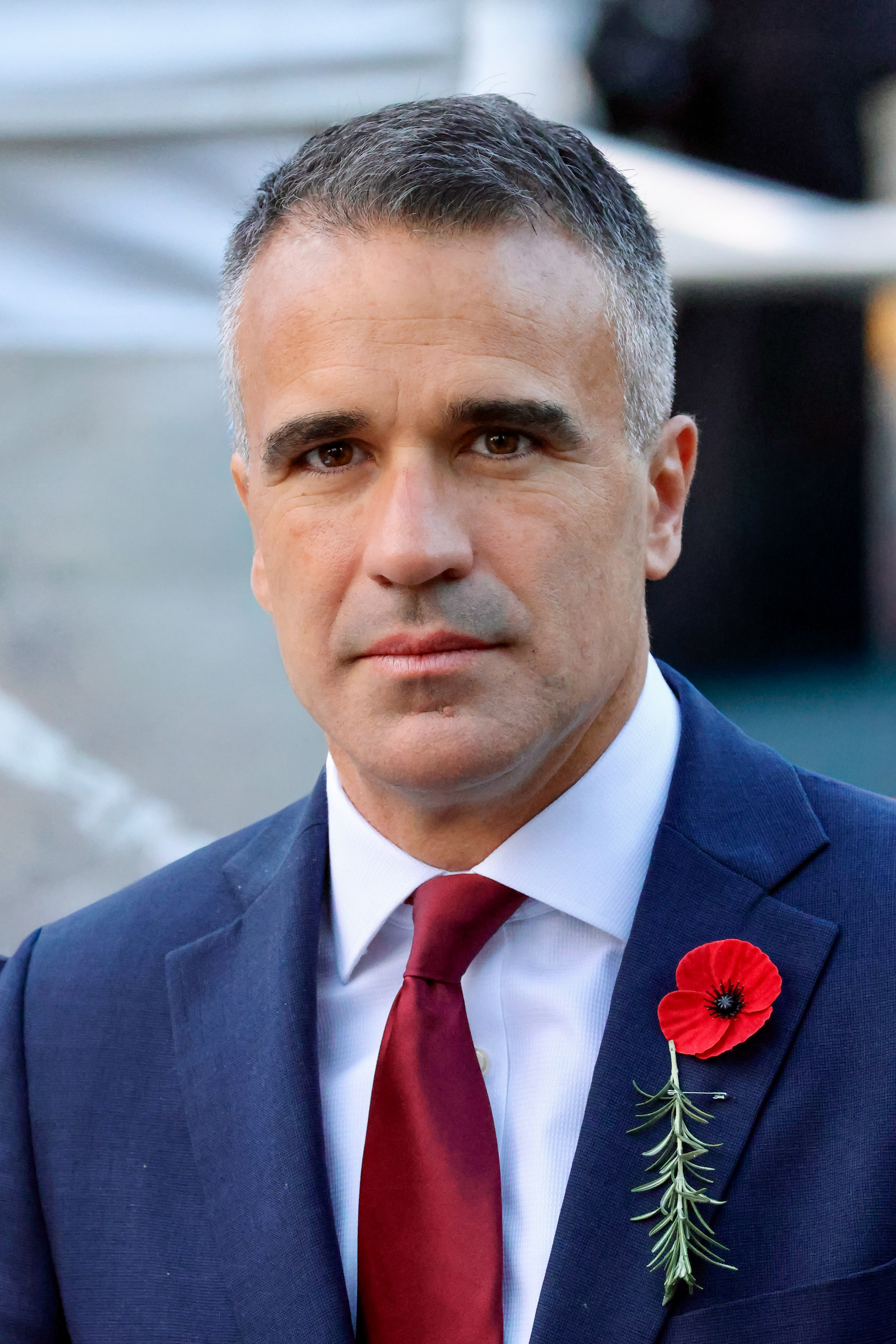

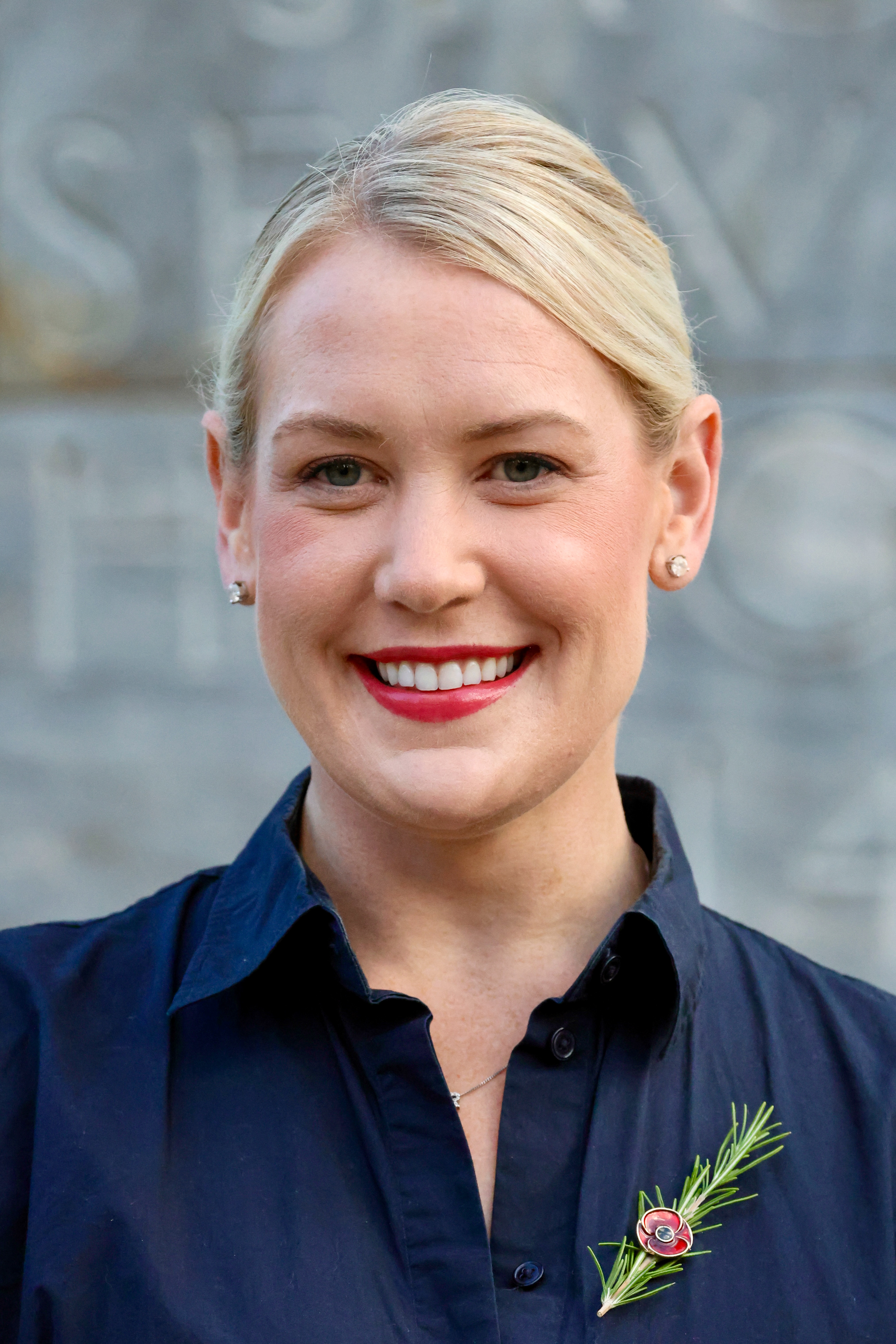

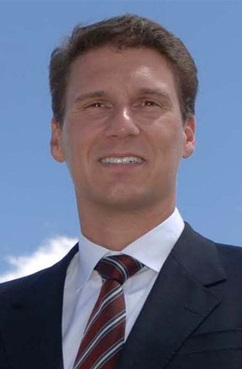
	First party	Second party	Third party
Leader	Peter Malinauskas	Ashton Hurn	Cory Bernardi
Party	Labor	Liberal	One Nation
Leader since	9 April 2018	8 December 2025	3 February 2026
Leader's seat	Croydon	Schubert	Legislative Council (won seat)
Last election	27 seats	16 seats	0 seats
Seats before	29 (Note: In July 2023, MacKillop MHA Nick McBride left the Liberals to sit as an independent.; In March 2024, Labor gained Dunstan from the Liberals at a by-election.; In April 2024, Labor MHA Leon Bignell was elected Speaker and moved to sit as an independent.; In November 2024, Labor gained Black from the Liberals at a by-election.; The seat of Mount Gambier became vacant on 2 September 2025 following the resignation of independent MHA Troy Bell.; On 5 September 2025, independent MHA Leon Bignell rejoined Labor.)	13	0
Seats won	34	5	4
Seat change	▲7	▼11	▲4
Popular vote	418,255	211,125	255,264
Percentage	37.5%	18.9%	22.9%
Swing	▼2.4 pp	▼16.8 pp	▲20.3 pp
TPP	N/A (Note: The Electoral Commission of South Australia abandoned an attempt to calculate a two-party-preferred result as 25 two-candidate-preferred contests were Labor–One Nation and 13 were Labor–Liberal. Antony Green provided a two-party-preferred count between the Labor Party, and the largest non-Labor candidate in each seat. This was estimated at 55.7–44.3 in favour of the Labor Party, a 1.1 pp swing towards them since the 2022 election. He noted that given how poorly the Liberals polled, Labor likely would've polled above 58% in a traditional two-party contest. Kevin Bonham estimated both a Labor–Liberal and a Labor–One Nation two-party-preferred vote. In a classic two-party contest, he had Labor winning 57.9–42.1, a swing of 3.3 pp. An estimated "shadow 2PP" had an even larger margin of victory for the Labor Party at 58.2–41.8 over One Nation. In their first opinion poll following the state election, DemosAU calculated a two-party-preferred vote between Labor and One Nation of 58.1–41.9.)	N/A	N/A
- Map of House of Assembly electorates.
Premier before election
Peter Malinauskas
Labor
Subsequent Premier
Peter Malinauskas
Labor

A state election was held on 21 March 2026 to elect the members of the 56th Parliament of South Australia. All 47 seats in the House of Assembly (lower house) were up for election, along with 11 of the 22 seats in the Legislative Council (upper house).

The incumbent Labor government, led by Premier Peter Malinauskas, was elected to a second four-year term in government in a landslide victory. In terms of both raw seats and percentage of seats available, it is SA Labor's greatest ever victory, exceeding its previous record in 1930, its best showing since the introduction of single-member districts in 1938, and the second-largest majority government in South Australian history. The opposition Liberal Party, led by Ashton Hurn, suffered a large swing against it and received fewer primary votes than right-wing populist party One Nation. They were also reduced to their smallest-ever presence in the legislature, finishing only one seat ahead of One Nation. This marks the first time the Liberal Party have finished outside the top two highest parties by vote share at a South Australian election, and One Nation's best performance in any state or federal election since the 1998 Queensland state election, when the party won 22.68%. An attempt to calculate a statewide two-party preferred vote was abandoned when it became apparent One Nation's showing was strong enough to render any 2PP result meaningless.

Aside from Labor, the Liberals and One Nation, other minor parties and independents contested the election. Left-wing environmentalist party the Greens recorded its highest share of votes at a South Australian election, though the party did not win any lower house seats. In total 436 candidates across both houses contested seats at this election.

In total Labor won 34 seats in the House of Assembly, while the Liberals won 5 seats, One Nation won 4 seats, and independents claimed 4 seats. In the Legislative Council, Labor won 5 seats, One Nation 3, Liberals 2 and the Greens 1 seat. This left the Labor government with 10 seats in the 22-seat chamber, thereby needing two additional votes from an opposition of 6 Liberals and a crossbench of 3 One Nation MLC's, 2 Greens MLC's and Sarah Game, in order to pass legislation.

South Australia has compulsory voting, with full-preference instant-runoff voting for single-member electorates in the lower house, and optional preference single transferable voting in the proportionally represented upper house. The election was conducted by the Electoral Commission of South Australia (ECSA), an independent body answerable to Parliament, and was held on the same day as the South Australian First Nations Voice election.

== Background ==
=== Previous election ===
At the previous election in March 2022, the Labor Party, led by Peter Malinauskas, formed government after spending four years in opposition, winning 27 seats in the House of Assembly, enough for a four-seat majority. The Liberal Party that had previously governed under Steven Marshall, won only 16 seats and formed the official opposition. The crossbench consisted of four independents: Troy Bell, Geoff Brock, Dan Cregan, and Fraser Ellis.

In the Legislative Council, Labor gained a ninth seat, becoming the largest party in the upper house. Following the election, Liberal MLC Terry Stephens was unexpectedly re-elected to the chamber's presidency, meaning that Labor only required two additional votes to pass legislation. The Liberals were reduced to eight seats, and the Greens remained steady at two. SA Best failed to win another seat with just 1% of the vote, leaving them with the two that they won at the 2018 election. One Nation won an upper house seat, with Sarah Game becoming the party's first Parliamentary representative in South Australia.

=== Composition of Parliament ===
In April 2022, Liberal MP and former deputy premier Vickie Chapman wrote a letter to the Speaker of the House Dan Cregan indicating her intention to resign on 31 May. This was interpreted by Cregan, backed up with legal advice, that this was an official resignation date, which she disputed. Labor declined to move a motion to declare her seat vacant, with the Leader of Government Business Tom Koutsantonis stating that it was a matter for the Liberal Party and the Leader of the Opposition. Regardless, Chapman resigned on 31 May, triggering a by-election in her seat of Bragg. Held on 2 July, Liberal candidate Jack Batty retained the seat for the party with a margin of 5.6 percentage points, representing a 2.5 per cent swing towards Labor from the state election four months prior.

In January 2023, Liberal MLC Stephen Wade resigned from the Legislative Council. His position was filled by Ben Hood in March 2023. In July 2023, Nick McBride left the Liberal Party to sit as an independent, claiming that "dark forces" in party factions had created an environment of disunity and backstabbing. In October 2023, Labor MLC Irene Pnevmatikos resigned after being re-diagnosed with kidney cancer. Her vacancy was filled by Mira El Dannawi. In December 2023, SA Best MLC Frank Pangallo left the party to sit as an independent after a feud with the party's other upper house member Connie Bonaros over the government's proposed university merger.

In February 2024, former premier Steven Marshall resigned from Parliament and retired from politics, triggering a by-election in his seat of Dunstan. Held on 23 March, Labor candidate Cressida O'Hanlon won the marginal seat with a 1.4 per cent swing towards her, increasing Labor's numbers in the lower house to 28. It was the first time that a sitting government in South Australia had taken a seat from the opposition at a by-election in over a century. In April 2024, Dan Cregan resigned as Speaker of the House. Labor MP Leon Bignell was elected unopposed to the position later that month and temporarily left the Labor Party, as is required for the role of Speaker. In October 2024, former Leader of the Liberal Party and Leader of the Opposition David Speirs resigned from Parliament after revealing that he had been arrested on suspicion of drug offences. The ensuing by-election in his seat of Black was won by Labor's Alex Dighton, who received a 12.6 per cent swing towards him. It was the second seat Labor had gained from a by-election within nine months, further increasing their majority and reducing the Liberals to 13 seats in the lower house.

In January 2025, Liberal MLC Jing Lee quit the party to sit as an independent. In May 2025, MLC Tammy Franks quit the Greens to sit as an independent, due to internal tensions within the party. A week later, Sarah Game, the first One Nation candidate elected to the South Australian Parliament, quit the party, stating that there were problems with how the party's brand was perceived. She later formed her own party, Fair Go for Australians, in July. In August 2025, independent MLC Frank Pangallo joined the Liberal Party to run as their candidate for Waite in the state election. In September 2025, independent MP Troy Bell resigned from Parliament after an unsuccessful appeal against his theft and fraud charges. A by-election was not held due to the cost of a regional by-election and the closeness to the state election. Speaker of the House Leon Bignell rejoined the Labor Party on 5 September 2025.

=== Pre-election standings and pendulum ===
Parties are listed according to their primary vote share at the previous state election.

Affiliation	House of Assembly			Legislative Council		
Affiliation	2022 election	At dissolution	Change	2022 election	At dissolution	Change
Labor	27	29	▲2	9	9	Steady
Liberal	16	13	▼3	8	8	Steady
Greens	0	0	Steady	2	1	▼1
Independent	4	4	Steady	0	1	▲1
One Nation	0	0	Steady	1	0	▼1
SA Best	0	0	Steady	2	1	▼1
Better Community	0	0	Steady	0	1	▲1
Fair Go	0	0	Steady	0	1	▲1
Vacant	0	1	▲1	0	0	Steady
Total seats	47			22		

== Electoral system ==
Members of the House of Assembly are elected by instant-runoff voting using full preferential voting. Each electoral district elects a single member.

Members of the Legislative Council are elected by proportional representation using a single transferable vote. Members serve staggered eight-year terms with half of the Council elected at each state election.

=== 2024 redistribution ===
Abolished district

The Electoral district of Frome was abolished and replaced with the district of Ngadjuri.

As required under the South Australian Constitution, the South Australian Electoral Districts Boundaries Commission must re-draw the boundaries of the House of Assembly electoral districts after each election.

The commission's report was handed down in December 2024. The report noted that given the outcome of the previous election, it was possible to achieve minimal disturbance in the redistribution. The only electoral district outside of the allowable electoral quota was Taylor, which was 12.6% over and projected to be 18.6% by the middle of 2026. Five other districts were calculated to have a quota variance at or above 8% by 2026: Croydon (+8.1%), Flinders (–8.0%), Giles (–10.1%), Kaurna (+10.0%), and Kavel (10.0%). In the draft report four months earlier, the commission had recommended changes to the boundaries of Flinders, Black, Croydon, Gibson, Morphett, and West Torrens, but decided to retain the boundaries from the 2020 redistribution. Changes were made to 16 of the 47 districts. The redistribution meant that only five districts had a variance quota greater than five per cent.

The commission received two submissions to rename electoral districts. John Fulbrook, the member for Playford, requested that the district be renamed to avoid confusion with the City of Playford Council. He explained that his office once received 30 phone calls in a day from City of Playford ratepayers over a proposed increase in council rates. This suggestion was rejected, with the Commission stating that the electoral district has borne the name of Playford for 18 years longer than the local government area.

Reggie Martin MLC made a submission concerning the name of the Electoral district of Frome. The district was named after the third Surveyor General of South Australia, Edward Charles Frome. Martin expressed concerns over the use of Frome's name due to his involvement in retributive actions against Aboriginal people in the Coorong area following the Maria massacre. The Commission sought further information from Dr Skye Krichauff, a historian specialising in South Australian colonial history and the relations between Aboriginal people and colonists, and Professor Irene Watson. The Commission determined that the district should be renamed, and received various submissions from Aboriginal organisations who have a connection to the area encompassed by the district of Frome. The name "Ngadjuri", meaning "we people", was chosen over the name "Cowie", meaning "water".

Submissions were made for the commemorative naming of electoral districts following the deaths of former premier Steele Hall, and Indigenous rights advocate Lowitja O'Donoghue. The Commission determined that the names were appropriate for an electoral district, however, it is current practice under the Geographical Names Act 1991 that a person should be dead for at least a year before their name is considered for commemorative naming. Submissions were also made for naming in honour of political activist Elizabeth Rose Hanretty, and former premiers John Bannon and David Tonkin. The Commission determined that their names may be appropriate for an electoral district in a future redistribution.

== Election date ==
The last state election was held on 19 March 2022 to elect members for the House of Assembly and half of the members in the Legislative Council. In South Australia, section 28 of the Constitution Act 1934, as amended in 2001, directs that parliaments have fixed four-year terms, and elections must be held on the third Saturday in March every four years unless this date falls the day after Good Friday, occurs within the same month as a federal election, or the conduct of the election could be adversely affected by a state disaster. Section 28 also states that the Governor may also dissolve the Assembly and call an election for an earlier date if the government has lost the confidence of the Assembly or a bill of special importance has been rejected by the Legislative Council. Section 41 states that both the Council and the Assembly may also be dissolved simultaneously if a deadlock occurs between them.

The Electoral (Miscellaneous) Amendment Act 2013 introduced set dates for writs for general elections in South Australia. The writ sets the dates for the close of the electoral roll and the close of nominations for an election. The Electoral Act 1985 requires that, for a general election, the writ be issued 28 days before the date fixed for polling (S47(2a)) and the electoral roll be closed at 12 noon, six days after the issue of the writ (S48(3(a)(i))). The close of nominations will be at 12 noon three days after the close of rolls (Electoral Act 1985 S48(4)(a) and S4(1)).

Election timeline
Date	Event
21 February 2026	Issue of writs
23 February 2026	Candidate nominations open
27 February 2026	Electoral rolls close Party candidate nominations close
2 March 2026	Independent candidate nominations close Declaration of nominations
14 March 2026	Early voting opens
21 March 2026	Polling day

== Registered parties ==
There were 18 political parties registered with the Electoral Commission of South Australia at the declaration of nominations on 2 March 2026. Parties in bold fielded at least one candidate in either the House of Assembly or Legislative Council election.

- **Animal Justice Party**
- Australian Citizens Party
- **Australian Family Party**
- **Australian Greens SA**
- **Australian Labor Party (South Australian Branch)**
- **Family First Party**
- For Unley
- **Jing Lee Better Community**
- **Legalise Cannabis South Australia Party**
- **Liberal Party of Australia (SA Division)**
- Libertarian Party SA
- **National Party of Australia (SA)**
- **One Nation**
- **Sarah Game Fair Go for Australians**
- **SA Best**
- SA Socialists
- **Stephen Pallaras Real Change SA**
- **United Voice Australia Party**

== Candidates ==
Number of candidates by electoral district. 5 6 7 8 9 10 11 12

A total of 436 candidates are contesting the election for the 56th Parliament of South Australia, up from 291 in 2022, and the most in the state's history. 388 are standing for the 47 House of Assembly seats and 48 for the 11 Legislative Council vacancies. Of the 436 candidates, 268 are men, 164 are women, with four unspecified. The most heavily contested seats are Hammond and Port Adelaide with 12 candidates in each electorate. It is the first time that a single seat will be contested by more than nine candidates. By contrast, the least contested seat is Bragg, with just five candidates.

Five parties, Labor, Liberal, the Greens, One Nation, and the Australian Family Party, are contesting all 47 lower house districts. Antony Green notes that a majority of candidates are from minor right-wing parties, which would mostly disadvantage the Liberal Party as some preferences will leak away to Labor, who don't have to contend with a similar fracturing of support. A number of parties are fielding large numbers of candidates in the upper house election: Labor have seven candidates, Liberal and SA Best have five each, One Nation have four, and the Greens and the Australian Family Party have three each.

== Disendorsements, withdrawals and controversies ==
On 11 March, former AFL player Chris McDermott, the lead candidate for the Fair Go Party in the Legislative Council, quit the party citing irreconcilable differences, although he still appeared at the top of the party's upper house ticket and would have sat as an independent if elected. Sarah Game subsequently advised voters to not vote for the party in the Legislative Council, instead suggesting the Liberal Party could be the only "legitimate opposition [to the Labor Party]."

On 12 March, Carlton Woodhouse, the Liberal Party's candidate for Wright, was disendorsed after comments he made on an American podcast demonising Islam, feminism, same-sex marriage and "the trans agenda". As the disendorsement came after the close of nominations, Woodhouse still appeared on the ballot as the Liberal candidate. On the same day, party leader Ashton Hurn confirmed that while Woodhouse was no longer the party's candidate for Wright, the party would still honour Woodhouse's contract at Liberal Party headquarters. Liberal Senator for South Australia Alex Antić, who is aligned with the party's conservative faction, criticised the disendorsement saying that while he hadn't read what Woodhouse had said, "if this guy is disendorsed, or if he feels compelled to leave, we might as well shut the doors on this election with one week to go."

The day before the election, it was revealed that Aoi Baxter (also known as Trent Baxter), the One Nation candidate for Adelaide, had a warrant out for his arrest for failing to show up to a British court after he was charged with sexually touching a woman without consent. The party's media representative Richard Henderson was initially defensive when the Australian Broadcasting Corporation asked about the charges, commenting that it was a "charge but not conviction, right?". One Nation issued a statement to the ABC, stating that Baxter had not disclosed this information to the party and that it may be a different person. His profile was removed from One Nation's website shortly after. One Nation banned the ABC from its election night party over its coverage of the incident.

After the election, an ABC News investigation revealed that two further One Nation candidates, Schubert candidate, Bruce Preece, and Mawson candidate, Tyler Green, had been selected by the party despite accusations of domestic abuse and antisemitism respectively. Preece had been subjected to interim intervention orders for domestic abuse between 2012 and 2020, with court records showing he was charged with breaching the protection order at least once, while Green had published more than a dozen extremist posts on social media, including comments about "Jewish bankster wars" and promoting Holocaust conspiracy book, The Six Million: Fact or Fiction?

== Retiring members ==
=== Labor ===
- Susan Close MP (Port Adelaide) – announced 18 September 2025
- Stephen Mullighan MP (Lee) – announced 18 September 2025
- Lee Odenwalder MP (Elizabeth) – announced 9 October 2025
- Dana Wortley MP (Torrens) – announced 9 October 2025
- Leon Bignell MP (Mawson) – announced 27 November 2025
- Andrea Michaels MP (Enfield) – announced 30 January 2026

=== Liberal ===
- David Pisoni MP (Unley) – announced 8 October 2024
- John Gardner MP (Morialta) – announced 13 December 2024
- Matt Cowdrey MP (Colton) – announced 27 June 2025
- Terry Stephens MLC – announced 23 July 2025

=== Independent ===
- Dan Cregan MP (Kavel) – announced 28 January 2025
- Troy Bell MP (Mount Gambier) – resigned 1 September 2025. Seat left vacant.

== Campaign ==
Labor went into the election as firm favourites for a second term. By late 2025, multiple polls showed the Liberal Party would struggle to hold their marginal seats, with one internal poll suggesting they could be cut down to only three seats. By all accounts, this prompted opposition leader Vincent Tarzia to resign the party leadership in December. He was succeeded by first-term MLA and shadow health minister Ashton Hurn. Not only was Hurn the Liberals' fourth leader since 2022, but she was taking over with just over 100 days to go before the election.

The 2025 federal election was a warning sign of things to come. The Liberals lost their last seat in Adelaide when James Stevens lost Sturt to Labor challenger Claire Clutterham, leaving them with no seats in Adelaide for the first time since 1946. More ominously, the Liberals only won two Election Day booths out of over 400 in the capital.

=== Funding and lobby groups ===
The Electoral (Accountability and Integrity) Amendment Act 2024 came into effect on 1 July 2025, having passed Parliament with the support of Labor, Liberal, the Greens, and most independents. The new laws introduced a ban on political donations to political parties, candidates, members of Parliament, and third parties. Instead, parties and individuals will receive public funding, which includes administrative funding for political parties limited to non-political use, advanced funding for parties participating in elections, and policy development funding of up to $20,000 a year (indexed with inflation) to eligible parties. Non-incumbent candidates and newly registered political parties are exempt from the ban on donations and can access advanced payment to help with campaign expenses, in order to reduce barriers for new entrants into the political system. Third party groups, including businesses, trade unions, and think tanks, have an expenditure cap of $450,000 during an election campaign.

Candidates will receive funding based on the number of votes received at the previous general election, subject to whether or not they are affiliated with a registered political party, and whether or not that party has representation in Parliament. Candidates endorsed by a party with Parliamentary representation will receive $5.50 per vote, while candidates of parties with no members of Parliament at the time of dissolution will receive $6 per vote for the first 10% of total primary votes, and $5.50 for each vote thereafter. Incumbent independent candidates will receive $8.50 per vote, while non-incumbent independent candidates would receive $9 per vote up until 10 per cent of total primary votes, and $8.50 per vote above 10 per cent.

The new laws were welcomed by the Centre for Public Integrity, who believe that laws "gets the balance right". Public policy think tank The Australia Institute argued that the changes could lead to a less democratic system, stating that the vast majority of funding would go to the major parties and would make it harder for new entrants to campaign against incumbents. Independent Federal Senator David Pocock also opposed the legislation, calling it "a major party stitch-up that subverts parliamentary process and seeks to lock out more community independents."

Right-wing lobby group Turning Point Australia (TPAUS), an offshoot of the organisation formed by American right-wing activist Charlie Kirk, intends to lobby for minor right-wing parties at the election, and to this end established a chapter in South Australia in September 2025. TPAUS aims to establish chapters across Australia, including in high schools and universities, with its leader, Joel Jammal, wanting politicians to see the organisation as "the biggest threat in keeping voters informed". The group expects to spend over A$10,000 on their campaign, which will see them hosting events on university campuses, among other events.

=== Preferences ===
The Liberal Party directed preferences to One Nation over Labor, which drew criticism after Cory Bernardi, the lead candidate for One Nation's upper house ticket, stated the same day that he stood by comments he made 14 years prior linking gay marriage to the social acceptance of bestiality and backed party leader Pauline Hanson's suggestion that there were "no good Muslims".

Labor preferenced One Nation last in 44 out of 47 seats, with Treasurer Tom Koutsantonis stating that party rules specifically prohibited a deal with One Nation after Bernardi claimed that both parties had approached them. In the remaining three seats, David Speirs, Fraser Ellis, and Nick McBride, all incumbent independents who were formerly elected with the Liberal Party, were put last in Black, Narungga, and MacKillop respectively. Speirs, who was convicted of drug supply charges in April 2025, was preferenced last by both Labor and the Liberals shortly after he announced his candidacy.

One Nation did not direct preferences.

=== Newspaper endorsements ===
Newspaper	Endorsement
The Advertiser	Labor

== Opinion polling ==
A variety of polling organisations conducted nationwide and electorate-specific opinion polling for the election. Overall, polls predict a landslide victory for the Labor Party, with Labor having led every poll in both the primary and two party preferred vote. From the start of 2026 to the election, Labor’s polled vote ranged from 35% (Roy Morgan, 19–23 Feb 2026) to 44% (Newspoll, 11–17 Feb 2026).

Since the start of 2026, polls suggested that One Nation would record a higher primary vote than the Liberal Party; polled to be between 19% (DemosAU, 31 Jan–16 Feb 2026) and 28% (Roy Morgan, 19–23 Feb 2026), compared to the Liberal's 16.5% (Roy Morgan, 19–23 Feb 2026) and 20% (YouGov, 6–17 Feb 2026).

=== Graphical summary ===
A graph showing the primary vote opinion polling in the lead-up to the 2026 South Australian state election, with LOESS regression.

A graph showing the two-party preferred opinion polling in the lead-up to the 2026 South Australian state election, with LOESS regression.

== Results ==
The incumbent Labor Party government was re-elected for a second term, winning 34 of the 47 seats in the House of Assembly. This is a net gain of 7 seats from the previous election, giving Labor their highest seat count in their history, eclipsing their result at the 1930 state election, in which they won 30 seats. It was also the second-largest majority government in SA history, outdone only by the Liberals winning 37 seats in 1993. The Liberals fell to only five seats, a loss of 11, their worst position in their history. They won only one seat in Adelaide.

One Nation won the seats of Ngadjuri, Hammond, Mackillop and Narungga, the first time that the party had won lower house seats outside of Queensland. It was also the first time since 1982 that a political party other than Labor, the Liberals, or the Nationals had won a lower house seat in South Australia. Despite finishing four points ahead of the Liberals and doing well enough to render any attempt to calculate a statewide two-party vote meaningless, One Nation still finished one seat behind the Liberals. Its support was spread out across the state, and was not concentrated in enough areas to translate into seats. Additionally, the Liberals were the only party to direct preferences to One Nation in all seats. While One Nation made some inroads in Labor-held Adelaide seats, it was not enough to overcome minor left-wing preferences flowing overwhelmingly to Labor. In some rural seats, One Nation pushed Labor into third place, only for Labor preferences to flow overwhelmingly to the Liberals.

On 16 April 2026, the Electoral Commission announced that they had discovered 642 uncounted ballot papers in three recently returned sealed boxes. As a result of this, a recount was triggered in Narungga for 17 April, where 77 unopened ballot papers and 4 declaration ballot papers lodged in the neighbouring Stuart district were found. The recount indicated that the margin of Chantelle Thomas of One Nation, the winning candidate, would have increased from 58 to 74 votes if the missed votes were included in the final count.

=== House of Assembly ===
Government (34) Labor (34) Opposition (5) Liberal (5) Crossbench (8) One Nation (4) Independent (4) (Note: Independent MPs: Geoff Brock (Stuart), Matt Schultz (Kavel), Travis Fatchen (Mount Gambier), and Lou Nicholson (Finniss).)

House of Assembly (IRV) – Turnout 88.5% (CV)
Party	Primary votes			Seats	
Party	Votes	%	Swing (pp)	Seats	Change
Labor	418,255	37.5	–2.4	34	▲7
One Nation	255,264	22.9	+20.3	4	▲4
Liberal	211,125	18.9	–16.8	5	▼11
Greens	115,723	10.4	+1.3	0	Steady
Independent	60,949	5.5	–3.0	4	Steady
Family First	19,497	1.7	–1.5	0	Steady
Legalise Cannabis	10,878	1.0	New	0	Steady
Australian Family	9,257	0.8	+0.6	0	Steady
Animal Justice	5,531	0.5	+0.4	0	Steady
Real Change	2,965	0.3	+0.2	0	Steady
Fair Go	2,680	0.2	New	0	Steady
United Voice	2,057	0.2	New	0	Steady
National	1,426	0.1	–0.2	0	Steady
SA Best	257	0.0	–0.2	0	Steady
**Total**	**1,115,864**	**100.0**		**47**	
Informal votes	50,332	4.3	+0.7		
Turnout	1,166,196	88.5	–0.7		
Enrolled voters	1,317,186				
Source: Electoral Commission of South Australia

==== Two-party-preferred vote ====
In Australian politics, the two-party-preferred vote is the result of an election in which preferences are distributed between the two major parties, being, in South Australia, the Labor Party and the Liberal Party. However, due to the overperformance of One Nation, the Electoral Commission of South Australia did not calculate a state-wide two-party-preferred vote. As such, a number of psephologists and polling firms have estimated the two-party-preferred vote based on known preference flows between parties.

Of the 47 two-candidate-preferred contests, 25 were Labor–One Nation, 13 were Labor–Liberal, four were Liberal–One Nation, two were One Nation–Independent, and there was one matchup each of Labor–Greens, Liberal–Independent, and Labor–Independent.

Antony Green, the ABC's former chief elections analyst, calculated a two-party-preferred vote between Labor and "Non-Labor". This was estimated at 55.7–44.3 in favour of the Labor Party, a 1.1 pp swing towards them since the 2022 election. He noted that given how poorly the Liberals polled, Labor likely would've polled above 58% in a traditional two-party contest. At the time of publication, full preference flow data was not yet available, but the published distribution of preferences had Greens preferences flowing 80–85% to Labor, One Nation preferences flowed 65–70% to Liberal, and Liberal preferences flowing 55–65% to One Nation.

Kevin Bonham estimated both a Labor–Liberal and a Labor–One Nation two-party-preferred vote. In a classic two-party contest, he had Labor winning 57.9–42.1, a swing of 3.3 pp. An estimated "shadow 2PP" had an even larger margin of victory for the Labor Party at 58.2–41.8 over One Nation. He referred to his methodology as the "actual distribution method", where if one of the two-party-preferred sides is excluded during the count, the total up until that point is credited, with any votes beyond that point having their preference flows estimated. These estimations were that in a contest with the Liberal Party, Labor received 27.2% of One Nation preferences, 85.9% of Greens preferences, and 50.8% of independent preferences. In a contest with One Nation, Labor received 33.9% of Liberal preferences, 84.8% of Greens preferences, and 55.9% of Independent preferences.

In their first opinion poll following the state election, DemosAU calculated a two-party-preferred vote between Labor and One Nation of 58.1–41.9. No two-party-preferred was calculated with the Liberal Party, whose preferences were distributed 66.6% in favour of One Nation. Greens preferences were 80.4% in favour of Labor, and "others" were distributed 57.9% to Labor.

Preference flow estimates
From party	Two-party-preferred		
From party	ALP	LIB	ONP
Antony Green (9 April 2026)
One Nation	31.1%	68.9%	—N/a
Liberal	34.5%	—N/a	65.5%
Greens	84.5%	15.5%	—N/a
Greens	80.4%	—N/a	19.6%
Kevin Bonham (10 April 2026)
One Nation	27.2%	72.8%	—N/a
Liberal	33.9%	—N/a	66.1%
Greens	85.9%	14.1%	—N/a
Greens	84.8%	—N/a	15.2%
Independent	50.8%	49.2%	—N/a
Independent	55.9%	—N/a	44.1%
DemosAU (26 June 2026)
Liberal	33.4%	—N/a	66.6%
Greens	80.4%	—N/a	19.6%
Others	57.9%	—N/a	42.1%

==== Seats changing hands ====
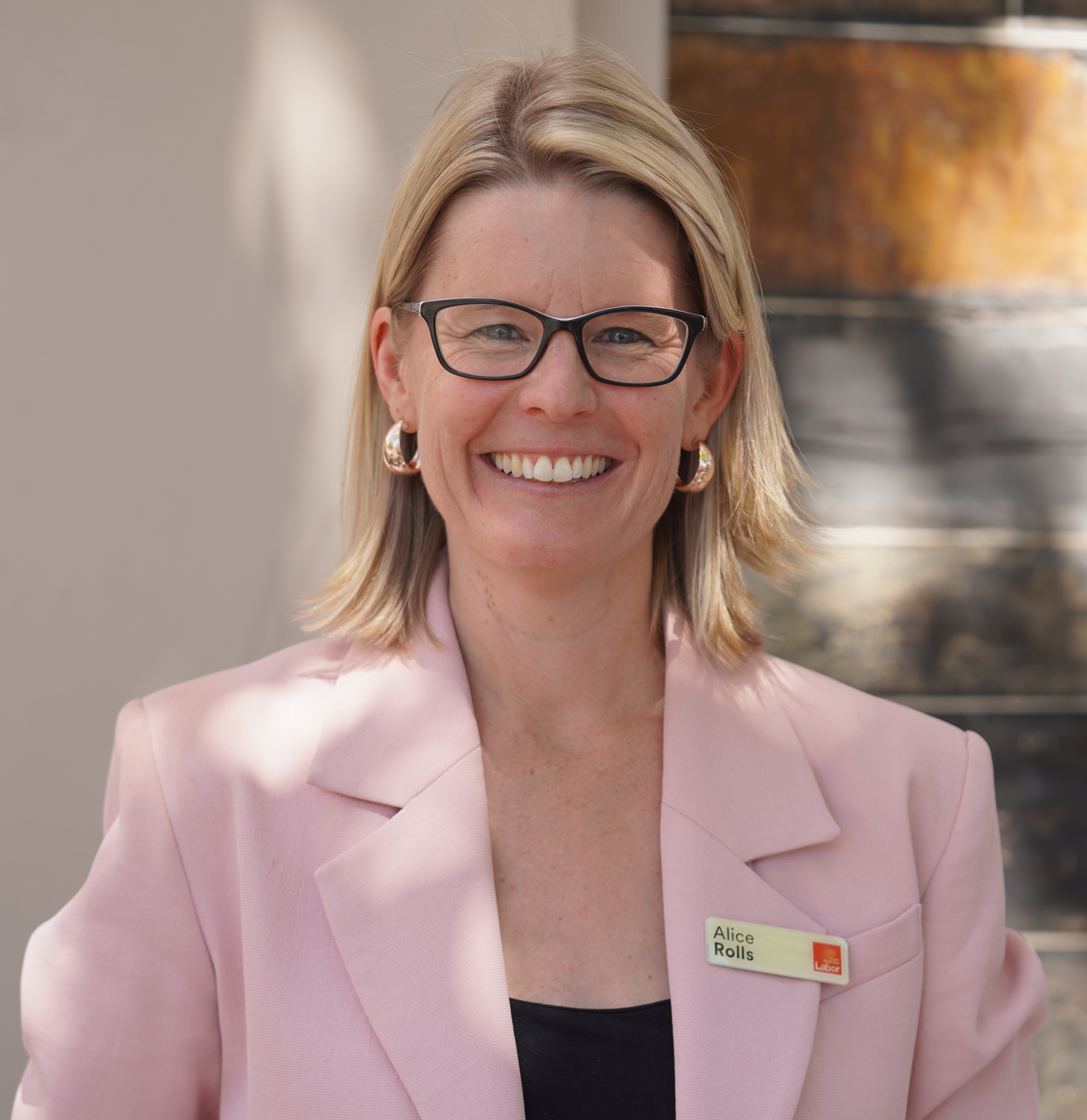
Alice Rolls (pictured) gained the seat of Unley from retiring Liberal David Pisoni.

Seat	Pre-election			Swing	Post-election		
Seat	Party	Member	Margin	Swing	Margin	Member	Party
Colton	Liberal	Matt Cowdrey	4.8	14.7	9.9	Aria Bolkus	Labor
Finniss	Liberal	David Basham	0.7	5.9	5.2	Lou Nicholson	Independent
Hammond	Liberal	Adrian Pederick	5.1	0.2	4.9	Robert Roylance	One Nation
Hartley	Liberal	Vincent Tarzia	3.6	8.3	4.7	Jenn Roberts	Labor
Kavel	Independent	Dan Cregan	25.4	15.7	10.6	Matt Schultz (Note: Schultz was endorsed by Cregan)	Independent
MacKillop	Independent	Nick McBride	22.6	23.5	0.8	Jason Virgo	One Nation
Morialta	Liberal	John Gardner	1.4	9.8	8.5	Matthew Marozzi	Labor
Morphett	Liberal	Stephen Patterson	4.5	5.2	0.7	Toby Priest	Labor
Mount Gambier	Independent	Troy Bell (Note: Mount Gambier was won by independent Troy Bell at the 2018 state election, but he resigned in September 2025, leaving the seat vacant.)	13.1	2.7	10.4	Travis Fatchen	Independent
Narungga	Independent	Fraser Ellis	8.3	8.0	0.1	Chantelle Thomas	One Nation
Ngadjuri	Liberal	Penny Pratt	8.1	3.8	7.1	David Paton	One Nation
Unley	Liberal	David Pisoni	2.2	9.0	6.8	Alice Rolls	Labor

==== Pendulum ====
**Labor seats (34)**
**Marginal**
Morphett	Toby Priest	ALP	0.7
Light	James Agness	ALP v ONP	1.6
Taylor	Nick Champion	ALP v ONP	4.2
Elizabeth	Ella Shaw	ALP v ONP	4.5
Hartley	Jenn Roberts	ALP	4.7
King	Rhiannon Pearce	ALP v ONP	5.2
**Fairly safe**
Mawson	Jenni Mitton	ALP v ONP	6.6
Unley	Alice Rolls	ALP	6.8
Dunstan	Cressida O'Hanlon	ALP	8.1
Giles	Eddie Hughes	ALP v ONP	8.5
Morialta	Matthew Marozzi	ALP	8.5
Lee	David Wilkins	ALP v ONP	9.4
Colton	Aria Bolkus	ALP	9.9
**Safe**
Reynell	Katrine Hildyard	ALP v ONP	10.1
Newland	Olivia Savvas	ALP v ONP	10.3
Hurtle Vale	Nat Cook	ALP v ONP	10.8
Kaurna	Chris Picton	ALP v ONP	12.0
Wright	Blair Boyer	ALP v ONP	12.5
Ramsay	Zoe Bettison	ALP v ONP	12.9
Gibson	Sarah Andrews	ALP	13.7
Port Adelaide	Cheyne Rich	ALP v ONP	14.4
Black	Alex Dighton	ALP v ONP	15.4
Torrens	Meagan Spencer	ALP v ONP	15.6
Florey	Michael Brown	ALP v ONP	16.1
Davenport	Erin Thompson	ALP v ONP	16.4
Cheltenham	Joe Szakacs	ALP v ONP	17.0
Playford	John Fulbrook	ALP v ONP	17.2
Adelaide	Lucy Hood	ALP	18.2
Enfield	Lawrence Ben	ALP v ONP	18.8
Elder	Nadia Clancy	ALP	19.1
Waite	Catherine Hutchesson	ALP	19.7
**Very safe**
Badcoe	Jayne Stinson	ALP v ONP	21.2
West Torrens	Tom Koutsantonis	ALP v ONP	23.2
Croydon	Peter Malinauskas	ALP v GRN	24.0

**Liberal seats (5)**
**Marginal**
Heysen	Josh Teague	LIB	0.6
**Fairly safe**
Chaffey	Tim Whetstone	LIB v ONP	6.0
Bragg	Jack Batty	LIB	8.5
Flinders	Sam Telfer	LIB v ONP	9.6
**Safe**
Schubert	Ashton Hurn	LIB	17.4

**One Nation seats (4)**
**Marginal**
Narungga	Chantelle Thomas	ONP v LIB	0.1
MacKillop	Jason Virgo	ONP v LIB	0.8
Hammond	Robert Roylance	ONP v ALP	4.9
**Fairly safe**
Ngadjuri	David Paton	ONP v ALP	7.1

**Independent seats (4)**
**Marginal**
Finniss	Lou Nicholson	IND v LIB	5.2
**Fairly safe**
Stuart	Geoff Brock	IND v ONP	6.9
**Safe**
Mt Gambier	Travis Fatchen	IND v ONP	10.4
Kavel	Matt Schultz	IND v ALP	10.6

=== Legislative Council ===
Government (10) Labor (10) Opposition (6) Liberal (6) Crossbench (6) One Nation (3) Greens (2) Fair Go (1)

Legislative Council (STV) – Turnout 88.8% (CV)
Party	Primary votes				Seats			
Party	Votes	%	Swing (pp)	Quotas	Seats won	Not up	New Total	Change
Labor	417,728	36.7	–0.3	4.4	5	5	10	▲1
One Nation	278,006	24.4	+20.2	2.9	3	0	3	▲2
Liberal	201,823	17.7	–16.7	2.1	2	4	6	▼2
Greens	116,048	10.2	+1.2	1.2	1	1	2	Steady
Legalise Cannabis	26,804	2.4	+0.3	0.3	0	0	0	Steady
Family First	24,452	2.1	–1.0	0.3	0	0	0	Steady
Ungrouped/Independent	15,152	1.3	±0.0	0.2	0	0	0	Steady
Animal Justice	14,843	1.3	–0.2	0.2	0	0	0	Steady
Real Change	11,926	1.0	+0.1	0.1	0	0	0	Steady
SA Best	7,438	0.7	–0.3	0.1	0	0	0	▼2
Better Community	6,862	0.6	New	0.1	0	0	0	Steady
Australian Family	6,147	0.5	–0.4	0.1	0	0	0	Steady
National	5,009	0.4	–0.3	0.1	0	0	0	Steady
Fair Go	3,458	0.3	New	0.0	0	1	1	Steady
United Voice	2,262	0.2	New	0.0	0	0	0	Steady
**Total**	**1,137,958**	**100.0**		**12.0**	**11**	**11**	**22**	
Informal votes	31,858	2.7	–0.9					
Turnout	1,169,816	88.8	–0.4					
Enrolled voters	1,317,186							
Source: Electoral Commission of South Australia; Australian Broadcasting Corporation

== Aftermath and reactions ==
The Australian Broadcasting Corporation's chief election analyst Casey Briggs reported a second term for Labor shortly after 7:45pm; within two hours of polls closing. By the end of polling day, the ABC projected that Labor had won 30 seats to the Liberal's four, with 13 still in doubt.

Ashton Hurn conceded defeat shortly after 9:30pm, announcing that she had called Peter Malinauskas to congratulate him on Labor's re-election. In her concession speech, Hurn remained optimistic, stating that "[the pundits] said that we wouldn't get a single seat, but tonight, we will prove them wrong." Despite the swing against the Liberal Party across the state, Hurn retained her seat of Schubert with a two-candidate-preferred vote of 67% against the One Nation candidate. Malinauskas claimed victory at around 10:15pm, thanking Hurn for her "poise and commitment throughout the course of the campaign" and wishing her success into the future. He also acknowledged One Nation's strong result, and recognised Cory Bernardi for calling to congratulate him on his victory. He said that he was ready to work with the leaders of the other political parties in Parliament, as long as it is in the interests of South Australians. He praised his Labor Party as being "one of the most disciplined, united political parties in the history of our federation", yet remained cautious, stating that the result should not be confused as adulation, instead seeing it as an "invitation to continue to work our guts out for the next four years". Towards the end of his speech, whilst reflecting on Australian "progressive patriotism", Malinauskas quoted a poem from Henry Lawson, which included the following stanzas:

Tis our duty to the stranger—landed maybe an hour— / To give all the information and assistance in our power. / To give audience to the new chum and to let the old chum wait, / Lest his memory be embittered by his first day in the state. / 'Tis our duty, when he's foreign, and his English very young, / To find out and take him somewhere where he'll hear his native tongue. / To give him our last spare moment, and our pleasure to defer — / He'll be father of Australians, as our foreign fathers were!

The Australian conducted a statistical analysis of One Nation's performance at the state election. The analysis found that swings towards One Nation were the largest in seats with low rates of postgraduate education, high rates of low-income earners, and high percentages of blue-collar workers. The party enjoyed its strongest support in rural and outer suburban areas.

=== Electoral Commission issues ===
The performance of the Electoral Commission of South Australia in managing the election and the concurrent First Nations Voice election has been scrutinised. In three seats, Narungga, Enfield and Newland, additional uncounted votes were discovered after the declaration of successful candidates. The uncounted ballots in Enfield and Newland were not sufficient to alter the outcome of the result, howeever in Narungga a recount was ordered, resulting in a narrow victory to the One Nation candidate. Technical glitching of electronic voting rolls and understaffing caused long lines at several polling stations on election day. Several Aboriginal voters reported being asked "intrusive" questions about their identity and staff who failed to recognise the Voice election being held in conjunction with the state election. The issues prompted the re-elected government to appoint former Australian Electoral Commission leader Tom Rogers to conduct an independent review of the management and oversight of the state election, and delay the forthcoming local elections to April 2027 at the request of the commission. Mick Sherry, the Commissioner of the electoral agency, resigned from the position on 16 June 2026.
