= 2024 South Australian Liberal Party leadership election =

- 12 August 2024
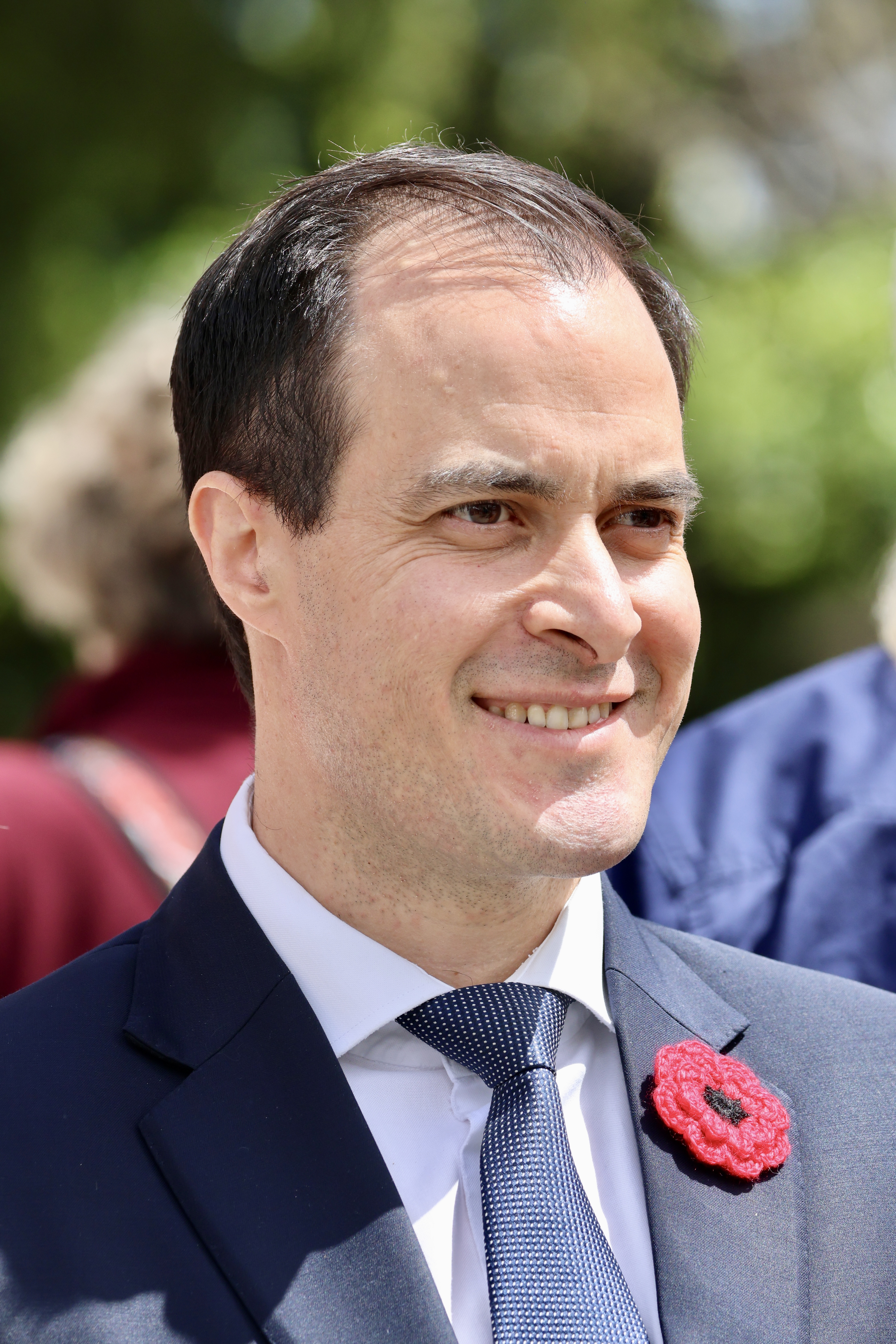

| Candidate | Vincent Tarzia | Josh Teague |
| Percentage | 81.81% | 18.19% |
| Caucus vote | 18 | 4 |
| Seat | Hartley | Heysen |
Leader before election
David Speirs
Elected Leader
Vincent Tarzia

The 2024 South Australian Liberal Party leadership election was held on 12 August 2024 to elect a new leader of the South Australian Liberal Party and Leader of the Opposition in South Australia.

David Speirs resigned his leadership on 8 August 2024, citing a desire to spend more time with his family and to give the party the best chance of winning the next state election. Speirs also criticised his party's internal factions following his resignation.

Speirs won the leadership in April 2022 following the Liberals' state election loss the month prior. Speirs stated that it was still his intention to remain in Parliament as an MP for Black, in Adelaide's southern suburbs.

== Candidates ==
Potential candidates
| Candidate | Electorate | Faction | Position(s) |
|---|---|---|---|
| John Gardner | Morialta | Moderate | Deputy Leader of the Liberal Party (2022–present); Deputy Leader of the Opposition (2022–present); Shadow Minister for Education, Training and Skills (2022–present); Shadow Minister for the Arts and Festivals (2022–present) |
| Vincent Tarzia | Hartley | Moderate | Shadow Minister for Infrastructure and Transport (2022–present); Shadow Minister for Sport, Recreation and Racing (2022–present) |
| Josh Teague | Heysen | Moderate | Shadow Attorney-General (2022–present); Shadow Minister for Aboriginal Affairs (2022–present); Shadow Minister for Child Protection (2022–present); Shadow Minister for the Prevention of Family and Domestic Violence (2022–present) |

== Results ==
2024 South Australian Liberal Party leadership election
| Party | Candidate | Votes | % | ±% |
|---|---|---|---|---|
| Liberal | Vincent Tarzia | 18 | 81.81 | +81.81 |
| Liberal | Josh Teague | 4 | 18.19 | −2.61 |
| Total formal votes | | 22 | 100.0 | |
