= SA Socialists =

Political party in South Australia

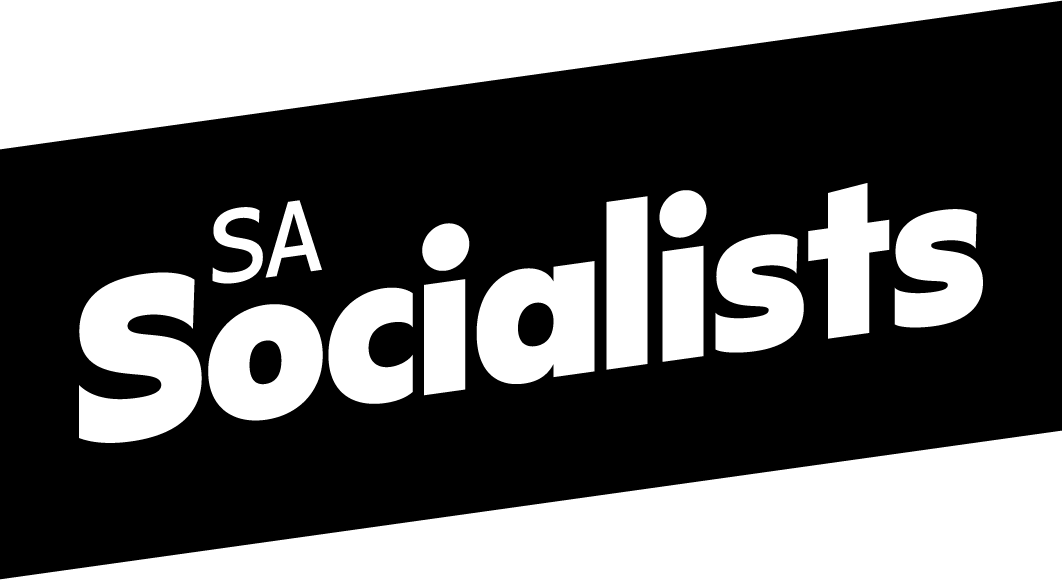
- Secretary: Tom Gilchrist
- Founded: 23 October 2025
- Membership: 400+
- Ideology: Socialism
- Political position: Left-wing
- National affiliation: Victorian Socialists

Website
- www.sasocialists.org.au

SA Socialists is a political party in South Australia. Registered in 2025, it is a socialist party established as a result of the national expansion of Victorian Socialists. The party is left-wing, and positions itself to the left of the South Australian Labor Party, claiming, "thousands of workers across this state have been left behind by a Labor government that has taken their vote for granted". Their stated aim is to "rebuild a fighting socialist movement and an anti-capitalist alternative to the major parties".

== Foundation ==
Following the 2025 Australian federal election, the Victorian Socialists party announced on 13 May 2025 that they intended to establish socialist political parties in the other seven states and territories of Australia.

=== 2026 South Australian election ===
Within two days of the party's announcement to expand, the party had grown to 200 members within South Australia, and reached over 400 members by February 2026. SA Socialists applied for registration with the Electoral Commission of South Australia in September 2025. The party was registered on 23 October 2025. Interim party secretary Tom Gilchrist said that SA Socialists would select candidates to run at the 2026 state election, focusing on working-class seats held by the Labor Party. However, due to electoral regulations requiring a party to be registered a minimum of eight months before an election for it to run candidates in its name, the party's two candidates were instead listed on the ballot as independents.

==== Independent candidates ====
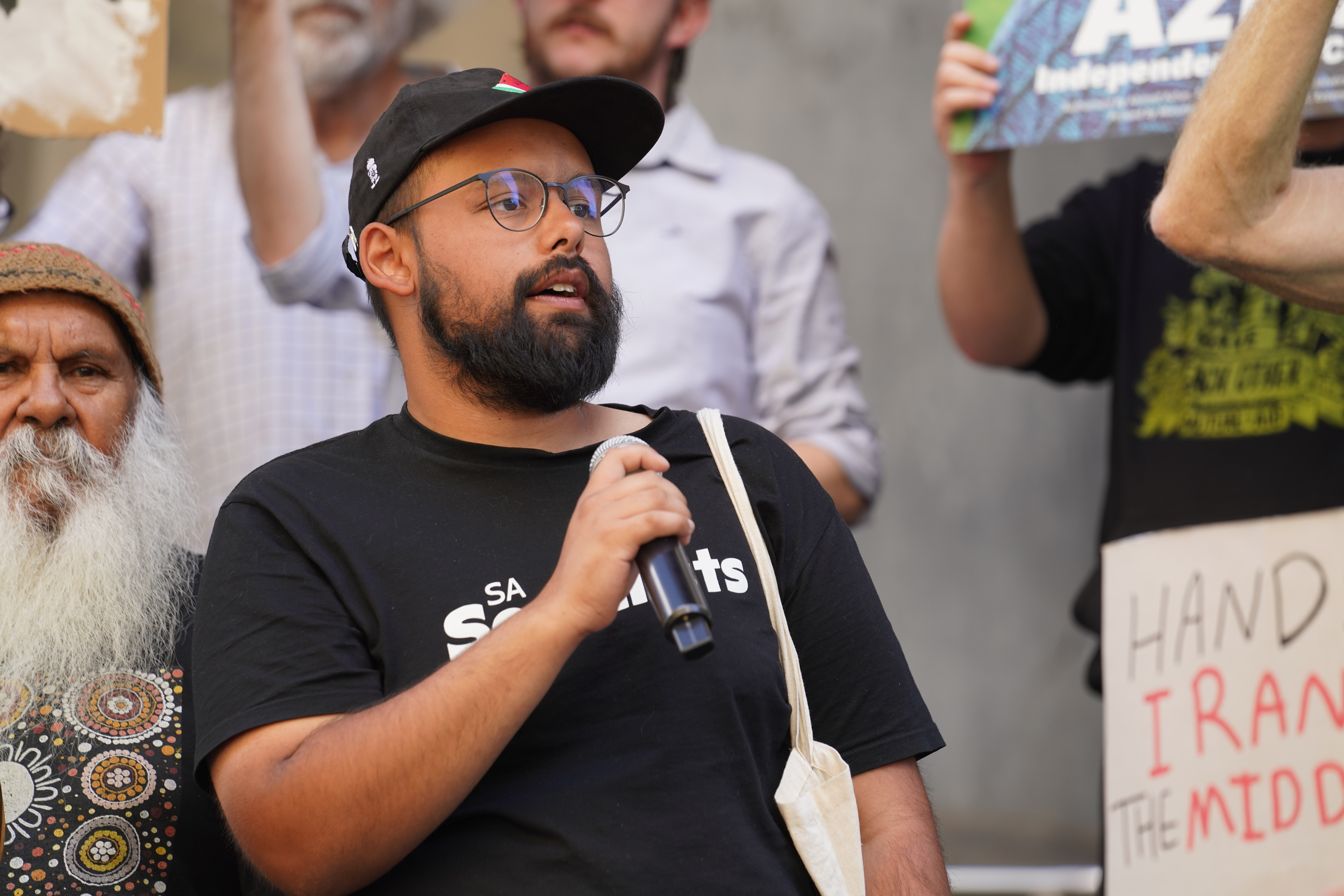
Azhar in 2026 at a protest opposing the Iran war

- Ahmed Azhar, a member of the party and a pro-Palestinian activist, announced in January 2026 that he would contest the seat of Croydon, held by Premier Peter Malinauskas. Azhar was arrested in 2025 under anti protest legislation introduced by the Malinauskas Labor Government, after participating in a protest supporting the delivery of aid to Gaza. The charges were later dropped. He received 1,308 votes (5.7 percent).
- Leila Clendon, a public school teacher and activist within the Australian Education Union, ran in the seat of Enfield, after Arts Minister and Labor MP Andrea Michaels announced she would not be re-contesting. According to Clendon, "Labor has been more focused on turning South Australia into the 'defence state' and home of AUKUS than investing in things our community really needs". She received 1,172 votes (5.0 percent).

== Structure ==
The supreme decision making body of the party is the Party Conference. Conferences are held every 18 months, and set the party's political platform, along with electing a leadership body. The conference is not delegated, so every financial member of the party has the right to speak, move motions, and vote.

The leadership structure of the SA Socialists consists of an Executive Council made up of 9 ordinary members and four Party Officers, namely the Secretary, Treasurer, Campaign Director, and Communications Director. These Officers, subject to directives of the Executive Council and Conference, are individually and collectively responsible for the day-to-day work of the Party and its political activities.

== Policies ==
In October 2025, Gilchrist stated that SA Socialists would campaign on issues relating to wealth inequality. He said that the party intended to provide an alternative to the left of Labor, and focus on issues relating to housing and healthcare, adding "I think there's an importance for a left party that can put forward radical anti-capitalist solutions to these problems". Azhar has stated his support for a rent freeze and the construction of new public housing.
