= Elizabeth Rose Hanretty =

Australian politician

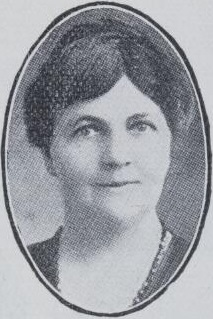

Elizabeth Rose Hanretty MBE (1881–1967) was an Australian political activist. She was a prominent woman in the labour movement, and served as the Australian Labor Party's South Australian assistant state secretary for forty years.

Hanretty grew up in poverty after her father died, leaving his widow to raise young children. She was educated at the North Adelaide public school, but left school at twelve to provide an additional income for the household. She was a housemaid and helped with children, worked in a store in Rundle Street, and later worked as a presser in a laundry, where she joined the nascent Women Employees' Mutual Association, an early women's union, along with most of her colleagues. She was a keen reader despite her circumstances, and became heavily interested in politics; she subsequently studied typewriting at a business college on the basis that these skills would prove useful in that work. She joined the North Adelaide local committee of the Labor Party in 1905, and was heavily involved in the union, holding every executive position, and serving as its representative to the United Trades and Labour Council of South Australia.

Hanretty was a representative of employees on the first Laundries Wages Board from 1909, and in 1911 was appointed as one of three Trades and Labor Council representatives to that year's Royal Commission into the shortage of labour. In June 1913, she founded and served as the first president of the Women's Political Education Association. She was appointed as lady organiser of the Labor Party in April 1914, serving in the role in a period in which time Labor won the 1914 federal election and 1915 state election. She resigned from that role after eighteen months, feeling that there was less need for her services, and briefly returned to pressing laundry. In 1916, she was vice-president of the Anti-Conscription League during the 1916 referendum on introducing conscription during World War I. She was an assistant state secretary of the Australian Labor Party from 1917 until 1956. She was returning officer for the Labor preselection plebiscites for the 1924 state election. She served for nine years on the Mental Defectives Boards from the mid-1920s. She unsuccessfully sought the office of state secretary in 1924, though she would become the first woman to act in the role in 1947. She was the first president of the state Labor Women's Central Organising Committee in 1928, and was vice-president of the Labor Women's Interstate Executive in 1931.

She was a staunch advocate for a livable wage for all women workers, and opposed employment discrimination against married women. She also advocated for increased representation within the party, equal rights and privileges for women in public office, and for women's parental rights. She consistently encouraged other women to run for public office, although she never did so herself. Hanretty was made a Member of the Order of the British Empire in 1957. Hanretty Place in the Canberra suburb of Bonython is named for her.
