= Members of the South Australian Legislative Council, 2022–2026 =

Members of the South Australian Legislative Council, 2022–2026

This is a list of members of the South Australian Legislative Council between 2022 and 2026. As half of the Legislative Council's terms expired at each state election, half of these members were elected at the 2018 state election with terms expiring in 2026, while the other half were elected at the 2022 state election with terms expiring in 2030.

| Name | Party | Term expires | Term of office |
|---|---|---|---|
| Connie Bonaros | SA Best | 2026 | 2018–2026 |
| Emily Bourke | Labor | 2026 | 2018–present |
| Nicola Centofanti | Liberal | 2030 | 2020–present |
| Mira El Dannawi ^{[2]} | Labor | 2026 | 2023–present |
| Tammy Franks | Greens/Independent ^{[5]} | 2026 | 2010–2026 |
| Sarah Game | One Nation/Independent/Fair Go ^{[6]} | 2030 | 2022–present |
| Heidi Girolamo | Liberal | 2026 | 2021–present |
| Justin Hanson | Labor | 2026 | 2017–present |
| Laura Henderson | Liberal | 2030 | 2022–present |
| Ben Hood ^{[1]} | Liberal | 2026 | 2023–present |
| Dennis Hood | Liberal | 2030 | 2006–present |
| Ian Hunter | Labor | 2030 | 2006–present |
| Jing Lee | Liberal/Independent/Better Community ^{[4]} | 2026 | 2010–2026 |
| Michelle Lensink | Liberal | 2030 | 2003–present |
| Kyam Maher | Labor | 2030 | 2012–present |
| Reggie Martin | Labor | 2030 | 2022–present |
| Tung Ngo | Labor | 2030 | 2014–present |
| Frank Pangallo | SA Best/Independent/Liberal ^{[3]} | 2026 | 2018–2026 |
| Irene Pnevmatikos ^{[2]} | Labor | 2026 | 2018–2023 |
| Clare Scriven | Labor | 2026 | 2018–present |
| Robert Simms | Greens | 2030 | 2021–present |
| Terry Stephens | Liberal | 2026 | 2002–2026 |
| Stephen Wade ^{[1]} | Liberal | 2026 | 2006–2023 |
| Russell Wortley | Labor | 2030 | 2006–present |

^{1} Liberal MLC Stephen Wade resigned on 27 January 2023. Ben Hood was appointed to replace him on 7 March 2023.
^{2} Labor MLC Irene Pnevmatikos resigned on 10 October 2023. Mira El Dannawi was appointed to replace her on 17 October 2023.
^{3} Frank Pangallo resigned from SA Best on 1 December 2023 to sit as an independent. On 17 August 2025, he was announced as the Liberal candidate for Waite, and joined the party on 19 August 2025.
^{4} Jing Lee resigned from the Liberal Party on 10 January 2025 to sit as an independent. Formed a new party Jing Lee Better Community on 22 May 2025
^{5} Tammy Franks resigned from the Greens Party on 13 May 2025 to sit as an independent.
^{6} Sarah Game resigned from the One Nation Party on 17 May 2025 to sit as an independent. Formed a new party Fair Go for Australians on 24 July 2025.

== See also ==
- Members of the South Australian House of Assembly, 2022–2026
