= 2022 South Australian Liberal Party leadership election =

- 19 April 2022
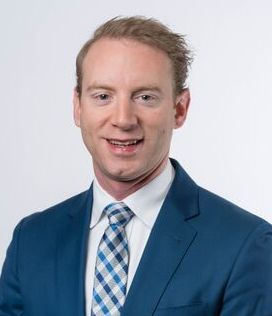

Candidate	David Speirs	Josh Teague	Nick McBride
Percentage	75%	20.8%	4.2%
Caucus vote	18	5	1
Seat	Black	Heysen	MacKillop
Faction	Unaligned (Note: Although nominally a Conservative, Speirs has maintained his status as being factionally unaligned.)	Moderate	N/A
Leader before election
Steven Marshall
Elected Leader
David Speirs

2022 South Australian Liberal Party deputy leadership election
- 19 April 2022
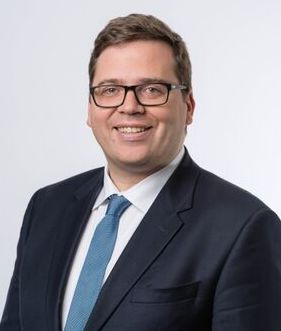

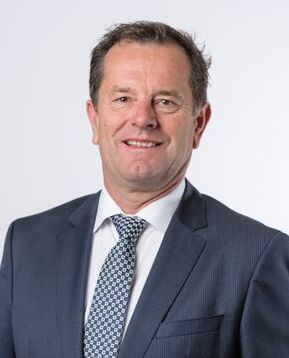

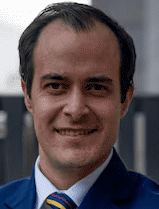
Candidate	John Gardner	Tim Whetstone	Vincent Tarzia
Percentage	68.8%	18.8%	12.5%
Caucus	11	3	2
Seat	Morialta	Chaffey	Hartley
Faction	Moderate	Moderate	Moderate
Deputy Leader before election
Dan van Holst Pellekaan
Elected Deputy Leader
John Gardner

The 2022 South Australian Liberal Party leadership election was held on 19 April 2022 to elect a new leader of the South Australian Liberal Party, following the previous months' state election loss and resignation of then-leader Steven Marshall. The leadership contest was between three candidates: David Speirs, Josh Teague and Nick McBride. Speirs won the ballot contest by an overwhelming majority, succeeding Steven Marshall as leader and becoming the Leader of the Opposition.

Quitting Leader and Premier, Steven Marshall, had held the position of leader from 2013 (9 years, 74 days), coming to the position following competitive, indecisive leadership contests. He was subsequently one of the longest-serving leaders of the party.

Deputy Leader Dan van Holst Pellekaan also stood down, being succeeded by John Gardner who beat Tim Whetstone and Vincent Tarzia in another three-way contest.

== Contest ==
With the new composition of the State Parliament, the total number of MPs (parliamentary caucus) eligible to vote were twenty-four. These were sixteen Assembly members and eight Council members.

With the leadership election not concluding until a month after the election, speculation began as to who would announce their candidacy to succeed Steven Marshall. Several names were put out such as Nick McBride, moderate-aligned Morialta MP John Gardner and expected front-runner David Speirs.

The first announced candidate for the leadership ballot was MacKillop MP Nick McBride on 21 March, two days after the election. Having almost quit the party a year prior, and only being in Parliament since 2018, the backbencher was considered the weakest candidate. The next announced candidate was former House of Assembly Speaker and former Minister for Planning and Local Government, Josh Teague (Heysen). Just days later the expected front-runner, former Environment Minister and eight-year MP David Speirs, who had unsuccessfully run for Deputy Leader in 2021, announced his candidacy. He was the longest-serving MP of the announced candidates, and the youngest (36–38).

Leadership ballot results
Candidate	Vote(s)	%
David Speirs	18	75%
Josh Teague	5	20.8%
Nick McBride	1	4.2%
	24 (Note: One MP, Vickie Chapman, voted via proxy.)	100%

Deputy leadership ballot results
Candidate	Vote(s)	%
John Gardner	11	68.8%
Tim Whetstone	3	18.8%
Vincent Tarzia	2	12.5%
	16 (Note: The vote for Deputy Leader was made exclusively by the Lower House MPs.)	100%

== See also ==
- 2022 South Australian state election
- 2022 Australian federal election
