= Real Change SA =

Political party in South Australia

Real Change
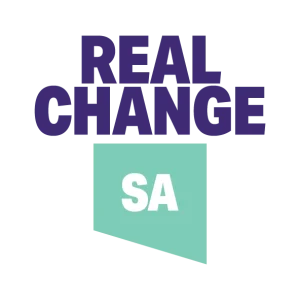
- Leader: Stephen Pallaras
- Founder: Stephen Pallaras
- Registered: 20 January 2022; 4 years ago
- Ideology: Centre-left; Legal Reform

Website
- stephenpallaras.com

Stephen Pallaras Real Change SA, known simply as Real Change SA, is a minor political party that has been registered in South Australia since 2022. It was founded by Stephen Pallaras, a former Director of Public Prosecutions, Solomon Islands High Court Justice, and True Crime show host.

== History ==
=== 2022 South Australian election ===
At the 2022 state election, it fielded four candidates in the lower house, winning 0.1% of the vote, and two candidates in the upper house, winning 0.86% of the vote.

=== 2026 South Australian election ===
The party fielded 12 candidates for the 2026 lower house election and two candidates in the 2026 upper house state election. The party won 0 seats.

== Electoral performance ==
=== House of Assembly ===
Election	Leader	Votes	%	Seats	+/–	Position	Status
2022	Stephen Pallaras	1,138	0.10	0 / 47	Steady	▲11th	No seats
2026	Stephen Pallaras	2,965	0.30	0 / 47	Steady	▲10th	No seats

=== Legislative Council ===
Election	Leader	Votes	%	Seats	+/–	Position	Status
2022	Stephen Pallaras	9,417	0.86	0 / 22	Steady	▲10th	No seats
2026	Stephen Pallaras	11,926	1.0	0 / 22	Steady	▲9th	No seats
