= 2024 Black state by-election =

- 16 November 2024

Electoral district of Black in the South Australian House of Assembly
- Registered: 26,540

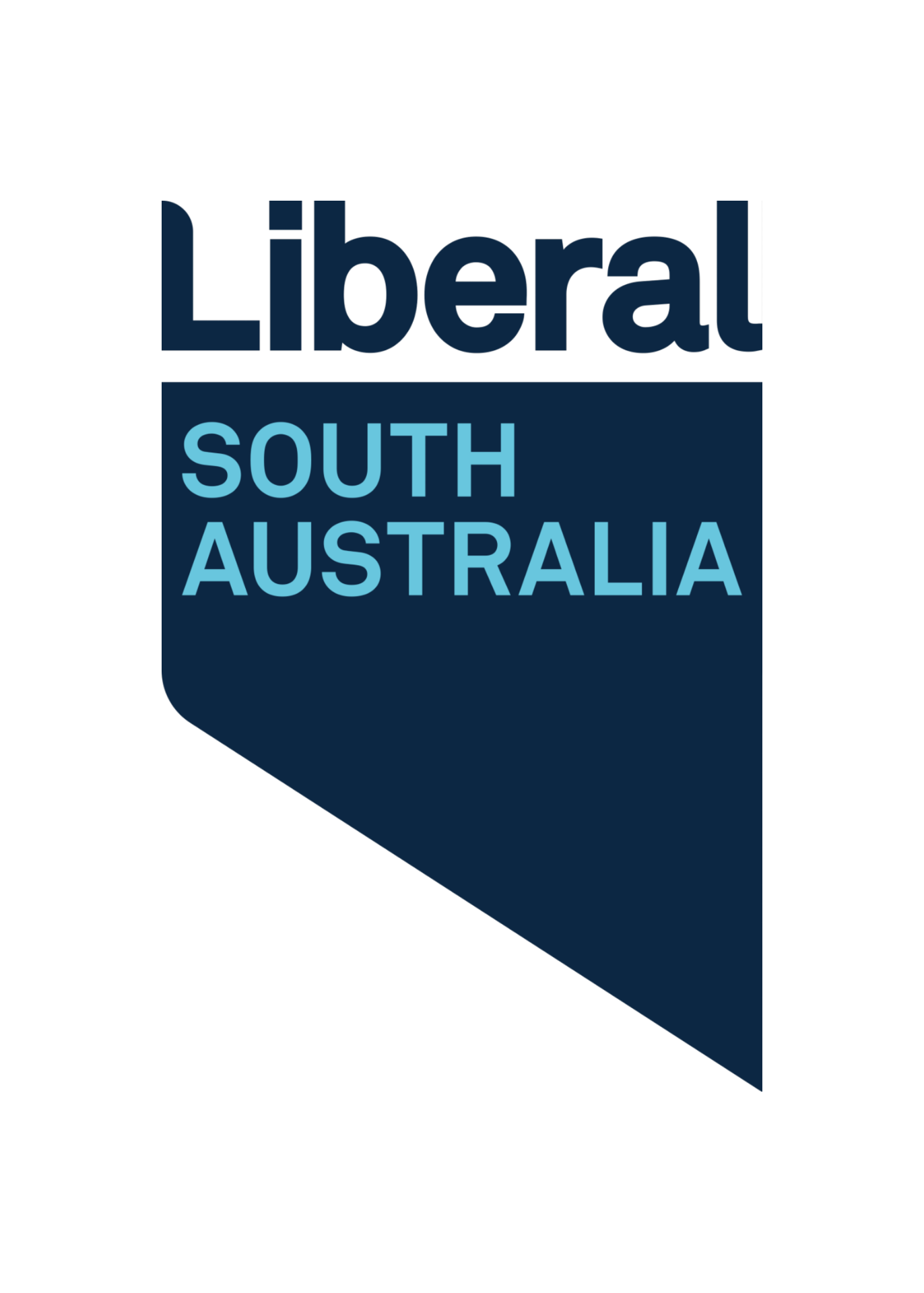

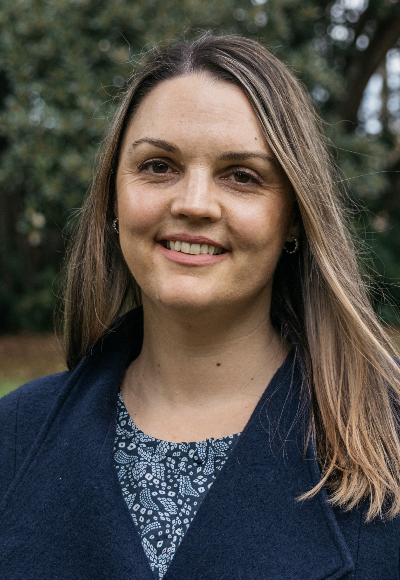
	First party	Second party	Third party
Candidate	Alex Dighton	Amanda Wilson	Sarah Luscombe
Party	Labor	Liberal	Greens
Primary vote	10,248	7,300	2,799
Percentage	47.9%	34.1%	13.1%
Swing	▲9.7%	▼16.0%	▲1.3%
TPP	59.9%	40.1%
TPP swing	▲12.6%	▼12.6%
- Black (highlighted in green) in the Greater Adelaide area
MP before election
David Speirs
Liberal
Elected MP
Alex Dighton
Labor

The 2024 Black state by-election was held on 16 November 2024 to elect the member for Black in the South Australian House of Assembly, following the resignation of Liberal Party MP and former Liberal leader David Speirs.

The Labor candidate Alex Dighton won the seat, with ABC election analyst Antony Green calling the result at 7:26pm ACDT on election night. It would be the second seat Labor has gained from the Liberals in a by-election in 2024, following their victory at the March by-election in Dunstan and both seats were vacated by a former Liberal leader with Dunstan formerly held by former Liberal Premier Steven Marshall.

== Background ==
The by-election was triggered by the resignation on 5 October 2024 of sitting Liberal MP and former Opposition Leader David Speirs, after he was charged with two counts of supplying a controlled substance on 26 September 2024. Speirs maintained his innocence and announced he would fight the charges.

On 15 October 2024, Speirs formally resigned to the Speaker of the South Australian House of Assembly, with the election date held on Saturday, 16 November 2024.

=== 2022 election result ===
2022 South Australian state election: Black
Party	Candidate	Votes	%	±%
Liberal	David Speirs	11,862	50.1	−0.9
Labor	Alex Dighton	9,037	38.1	+7.0
Greens	Liz Tidemann	2,785	11.8	+5.2
Total formal votes		23,684	97.4	
Informal votes		643	2.6	
Turnout		24,327	92.0	
Two-party-preferred result
Liberal	David Speirs	12,493	52.7	−6.5
Labor	Alex Dighton	11,191	47.3	+6.5
Liberal hold		Swing	−6.5	

Distribution of preferences: Black
Party	Candidate	Votes	Round 1	
Party	Candidate	Votes	Dist.	Total
Quota (50% + 1)		11,843		
Liberal	David Speirs	11,862	+631	12,493
Labor	Alex Dighton	9,037	+2,154	11,191
Greens	Liz Tidemann	2,785	Excluded	

== Candidates ==
Candidates who nominated for the by-election are (in ballot paper order):

Candidate nominations
Australian Family Party	Jonathan Parkin
Liberal Party	Amanda Wilson
Labor Party	Alex Dighton
Greens	Sarah Luscombe

On 8 October 2024, the Labor Party preselected Sacred Heart College senior leader Alex Dighton, who previously ran for the seat at the 2022 election.

Amanda Wilson, the mayor of Holdfast Bay, was preselected as the Liberal Party candidate. Wilson does not reside in the electorate, but said she has not ruled out moving to Black "in the longer term". Labor accused Wilson of being "parachuted" into the role.

It was revealed that Wilson had been a member of the Greens before joining the Liberal Party one week prior to her preselection. Wilson subsequently revealed that she had been approached by Peter Malinauskas to run for Labor in the seat of Gibson at the 2022 election, which he confirmed, as well as by Penny Wong to run as a Labor candidate for the federal seat of Boothby.

On 17 October 2024, The Greens announced that Marion councillor Sarah Luscombe would run as their candidate.

The Australian Family Party chose pilot Jonathan Parkin as their candidate for the by-election.

== Campaign and controversies ==
The Liberal Party claimed that Labor had introduced a “Lettuce Tax”, however the ECSA intervened, ordering the posts to be removed, deeming the claim was misleading, inaccurate and breached section 113 of the Electoral Act. Liberal Opposition leader Vincent Tarzia denounced the ECSA findings as “fake news”.

On 11 November 2024 it was revealed that the Liberals had spent $25,000 of public money on internal party polling by Sydney-based Freshwater Partners for the by-election. The Electoral Act requires registered political parties engaged in the public funding regime to abide by a strict spending cap of $94,482 in a by-election.

While the same day, Liberal figure Nicolle Flint accused Labor of sexism, after they released a corflute that stated Dighton was “working with” Malinauskas while Wilson was “working under” Tarzia. Flint called for Labor to remove the advertising.

== Results ==
2024 Black state by-election
Party	Candidate	Votes	%	±%
Labor	Alex Dighton	10,248	47.9	+9.7
Liberal	Amanda Wilson	7,300	34.1	−16.0
Greens	Sarah Luscombe	2,799	13.1	+1.3
Australian Family	Jonathan Parkin	1,069	5.0	+5.0
Total formal votes		21,416	97.7	+0.4
Informal votes		497	2.3	−0.4
Turnout		21,913	82.6	−9.5
Two-candidate-preferred result
Labor	Alex Dighton	12,820	59.9	+12.6
Liberal	Amanda Wilson	8,596	40.1	−12.6
Labor gain from Liberal		Swing	+12.6	

== See also ==
- List of South Australian House of Assembly by-elections
