= Electoral Commission of South Australia =

South Australian election commission

Electoral Commission SA
- Electoral Commission of South Australia LOGO

Agency overview
- Formed: 2009
- Preceding agencies: State Electoral Office (1993–2009); State Electoral Department (1907–1993)
- Jurisdiction: Government of South Australia
- Headquarters: Level 6, 60 Light Square, Adelaide
- Employees: 30 (2023)
- Annual budget: $16.5 million
- Minister responsible: Kyam Maher, Attorney General of South Australia, Minister for Industrial Relations and the Public Sector
- Agency executive: Vacant, Electoral Commissioner
- Website: Electoral Commission of South Australia

The Electoral Commission of South Australia (ECSA) is an independent office which forms part of the Government of South Australia, and which conducts parliamentary state elections every four years.

== History ==
In 1907 the then State Electoral Department was established to administer all South Australian parliamentary elections. It was renamed to State Electoral Office in 1993, and to Electoral Commission SA in 2009. Prior to this, elections in South Australia were administered by a "Returning Officer for the Province", an office which had been held by William Boothby from his appointment in 1854 until his death in 1903. George Hamilton Ayliffe, a long standing public servant, filled the role in the 1905 and 1906 elections and Charles Llandaff Mathews was the first state returning officer appointed under the State Electoral Department.

More than 120 parliamentary elections, by-elections and referendums have been conducted by this Office. The State Electoral Commissioner was first empowered to conduct miscellaneous elections in 1980, and later in 1990 the Attorney-General gave approval for the Commissioner to be appointed returning officer for local government elections when requested. In 1999 the Electoral Commissioner was appointed returning officer for all local government elections.

The Commission was the first electoral administration in the world to use computer technology to produce an electoral roll, the first prototype roll scanner, and the development and use of cardboard ballot boxes and voting compartments.

Mick Sherry was appointed commissioner in 2017; he took over from Kay Mousley, who was the first woman in the role. In 2026 Sherry resigned from the position after that year's state election was affected by multiple issues, including misplaced ballots, inadequate polling booth staff, computer glitches and late declarations of candidates for the upper house. Former Australian Electoral Commissioner Tom Rogers was appointed to lead an independent review of the elections.

== Redistributions ==
Redistributions are handled by the South Australian Electoral Districts Boundaries Commission, an independent commission established under the state constitution. The electoral commissioner is a member of this commission.

== See also ==
- Elections in Australia
