= Electoral district of Black =

South Australian state electoral district

Black South Australia—House of Assembly
- Interactive map of electoral district boundaries from the 2022 state election (Note: The electorate will have no change in boundaries at the 2026 state election.)
- State: South Australia
- Created: 2018
- MP: Alex Dighton
- Party: Labor
- Namesake: Dorrit Black
- Electors: 26,437 (2022)
- Area: 26.6 km^{2} (10.3 sq mi)
- Demographic: Metropolitan
- Coordinates: 35.05°S 138.53°E
Electorates around Black:
Gulf St Vincent	Gibson	Gibson
Gulf St Vincent	Black	Davenport
Gulf St Vincent	Reynell	Hurtle Vale

Black is a single-member electoral district for the South Australian House of Assembly. It was created by the redistribution conducted in 2016, and was contested for the first time at the 2018 state election. Black is named after Dorrit Black (Dorothea Foster Black, 1891–1951), a South Australian modern artist, best known for linocuts, oil and watercolour paintings.

Black lies south-west of the Adelaide city centre and includes the suburbs of Darlington, Hallett Cove, Kingston Park, Marino, O'Halloran Hill, Seacliff, Seacliff Park, Seacombe Heights, Seaview Downs, Sheidow Park and Trott Park.

At its creation in 2018, Black was projected to be notionally held by the Liberal Party with a swing of 2.6% required to lose it. Black replaced the electorate of Mitchell that was abolished ahead of the 2018 state election. Black does not extend as far north or south as Mitchell did, but extends west to the coast through part of what used to be Bright.

A by-election was held on 16 November 2024, after the incumbent MP, David Speirs, resigned due to legal charges. The by-election was won by the Labor candidate, Alex Dighton, following an 12% swing to Labor.

== Members for Black ==
Image	Member	Party	Term	Notes
	David Speirs (1984–)	Liberal	17 March 2018 – 15 October 2024	Transferred from electoral district of Bright. Leader of the Opposition from 2022 until 2024. Resigned
	Alex Dighton (1981–)	Labor	16 November 2024 – present	Won by-election. Incumbent

== Election results ==
2026 South Australian state election: Black
Party	Candidate	Votes	%	±%
Labor	Alex Dighton	10,286	43.0	+4.8
One Nation	Paula Wilson	4,469	18.7	+18.7
Independent	David Speirs	3,317	13.9	+13.9
Greens	Sarah Luscombe	2,929	12.2	+0.5
Liberal	Rhees Bishop	2,475	10.3	−39.7
Family First	Dianne Squirrell	271	1.1	+1.1
Fair Go	Jennifer Game	107	0.4	+0.4
Australian Family	Jethro Attard	76	0.3	+0.3
Total formal votes		23,930	96.5	−0.8
Informal votes		863	3.5	+0.8
Turnout		24,793	92.9	+0.9
Two-party-preferred result
Labor	Alex Dighton	15,647	65.4	+18.1
One Nation	Paula Wilson	8,283	34.6	+34.6
Labor notional gain from Liberal				
