= David Speirs =

Australian politician

The Honourable David Speirs
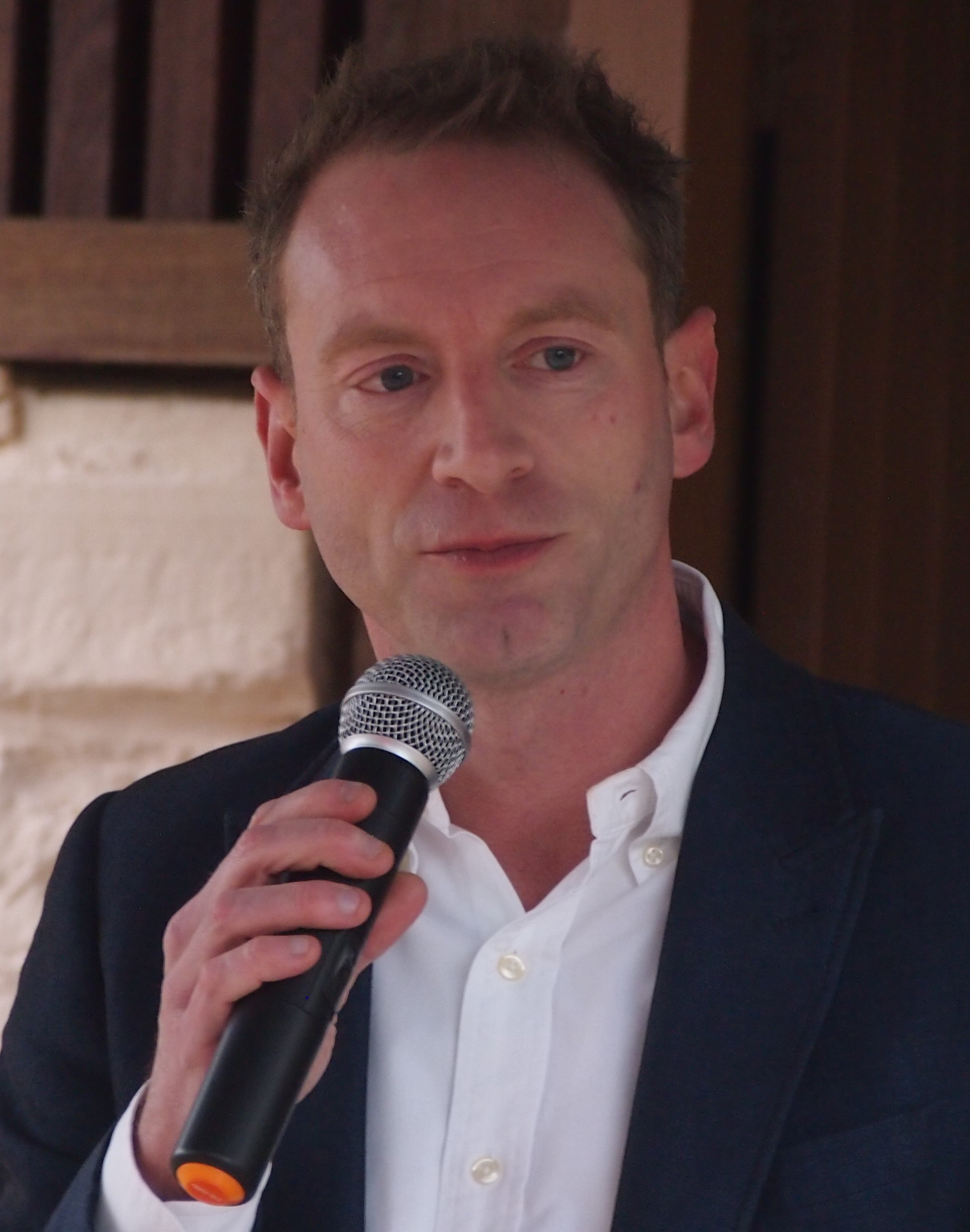
- Speirs in July 2024

Leader of the Opposition in South Australia
- In office 19 April 2022 – 8 August 2024
- Premier: Peter Malinauskas
- Deputy: John Gardner
- Preceded by: Peter Malinauskas
- Succeeded by: Vincent Tarzia

Leader of the South Australian Liberal Party
- In office 19 April 2022 – 8 August 2024
- Deputy: John Gardner
- Preceded by: Steven Marshall

Minister for Environment and Water
- In office 22 March 2018 – 21 March 2022
- Premier: Steven Marshall
- Preceded by: Ian Hunter (as Minister for Sustainability, Environment and Conservation and as Minister for Water and the River Murray)
- Succeeded by: Susan Close (as Minister for Climate, Environment and Water)

Member of the South Australian House of Assembly for Black
- In office 17 March 2018 – 15 October 2024
- Preceded by: New seat
- Succeeded by: Alex Dighton

Member of the South Australian House of Assembly for Bright
- In office 15 March 2014 – 17 March 2018
- Preceded by: Chloë Fox
- Succeeded by: District abolished

Personal details
- Born: David James Speirs; 15 December 1984 (age 41) Galloway, Scotland
- Party: Independent (2026–present)
- Other political affiliations: Liberal Party of Australia (SA) (–2026)
- Education: Stranraer Academy
- Alma mater: University of Adelaide

David James Speirs (born 15 December 1984) is a Scottish-Australian politician, who was the Leader of the Opposition in South Australia and Leader of the South Australian Liberal Party from April 2022 until August 2024. He was a member of the South Australian House of Assembly from the 2014 state election, representing the electorate of Bright from 2014 to 2018, and its successor, the electorate of Black, from 2018 to 2024.

Speirs served as the Minister for Environment and Water in the Marshall Ministry between March 2018 and March 2022.

On 8 August 2024 Speirs resigned as State Liberal Party leader, triggering a contest for his position, which was won by Vincent Tarzia. On 5 October, Speirs announced he would resign from the SA Parliament after he was charged with drug-supply offences, of which he was later convicted. In 2026, Speirs returned as an independent candidate for the electorate of Black in the South Australian state election, but was not successful in regaining the seat.

== Background and early career ==
Speirs was born in Galloway, Scotland, and was schooled at Kirkcolm Primary School and Stranraer Academy. He emigrated to Australia with his parents and two younger brothers at the age of 17 in 2002.

In 2008, Speirs graduated from the University of Adelaide with a Bachelor of Laws (Honours). He was elected as a councillor and deputy mayor for the Marion City Council, serving between 2010 and 2014. He worked in senior and principal policy development positions within the state Cabinet Office, in the Department of the Premier and Cabinet, between 2008 and 2014.

Speirs was a national director of the Duke of Edinburgh's Award in Australia between 2010 and 2014. In 2012, Speirs received the Community Leadership Award at the Channel 9 Young Achievers Awards.

== Parliamentary career ==
Speirs entered the South Australian Parliament in March 2014, defeating Chloë Fox, Labor's Minister for Transport Services.

In October 2014, Speirs was appointed to the Parliament's Economic and Finance Committee following the resignation of Iain Evans. In January 2016, he was elevated to Steven Marshall's Shadow Cabinet as Shadow Cabinet Secretary. In January 2017, Speirs ascended to the front bench as Shadow Minister for the Environment.

In March 2018, following the election of the Marshall Government at the South Australian Election, Speirs was sworn in as Minister for Environment and Water.

During his time as Minister, Speirs oversaw the establishment of Green Adelaide and regional landscape boards, significant reduction of water bills and an increase in the land protected as national parks including the creation of Glenthorne National Park in Adelaide's southern suburbs and Australia's biggest national park at the Simpson Desert.

In March 2021, legislation introduced by Speirs meant South Australia became the first state in Australia to ban single-use plastics. The first items to be banned were single-use plastic straws, cutlery and drink stirrers with other items such as polystyrene containers phased out in March 2022.

In November 2021, Speirs contested the deputy party leader and Deputy Premier ballot, but lost to Dan van Holst Pellekaan.

After outgoing Premier Steven Marshall resigned as leader of the Liberal Party, Speirs was elected leader on 19 April 2022, becoming South Australia's 44th Opposition Leader.

On 8 August 2024, Speirs stood down as Opposition leader, saying he had had a "gutful" of the job and wanted to give the party the best chance in the next election. The subsequent Liberal leadership election was won by Vincent Tarzia. Speirs stated he intended to remain in parliament as the member for the electoral district of Black.

Following his resignation from Opposition leadership, Speirs was embroiled in a scandal over a video that appeared to show him using illicit substances. Speirs initially claimed the video was a deepfake but, on 5 October 2024, he announced that he would resign from South Australia's parliament, revealing that his house had been raided and he had been arrested as a result of the video.

=== 2026 State election ===
On 27 February 2026, Speirs confirmed he had nominated to run in the 2026 SA election as an independent for his former seat of Black. The Electoral Commission of South Australia had said in January that Speirs would not be eligible for public campaign funding under the state's new election funding system, pointing to clauses in the state's constitution that say a candidate is not eligible for nomination if they would be required to vacate their seat upon election, and that a MP's seat becomes vacant if they are "convicted of an indictable offence". Candidates will be officially declared on 2 March 2026. On 28 February, both the Liberal and Labor parties said they would preference Speirs last. Speirs lost to South Australian Labor Party's incumbent MP in the electoral district of Black, Alex Dighton, placing third on March 21 following the 2026 South Australian state election.

== Political views ==
Speirs has been described as socially conservative. He voted against abortion and euthanasia reforms, but said he was "not going to die on ideological mountains." Speirs supported nuclear energy, a position that was backed by South Australian uranium miners. He opposed the state and federal Indigenous Voice to Parliament proposals, but supported constitutional recognition of Indigenous Australians.

== Personal life ==
Speirs was previously married. In his maiden speech, he called himself a "believing practising Christian" and pledged to conduct himself "within the moral constraints of the Christian faith". He faced criticism in 2021 when he spoke at a church and encouraged those in attendance to join the Liberal Party, but later said the issue had been taken out of context.

Speirs is an active lifesaver at the Brighton Surf Lifesaving Club and has a strong interest in health and fitness. He is a founding member of the Hallett Cove-based environmental group, Friends of the Lower Field River, a Landcare group established by Hallett Cove residents in 2006 to protect and care for the lower portion of the Field River and its environs.

Speirs completed all three levels of The Duke of Edinburgh's Award. He also reportedly owned 13 properties by 39 years of age.

In March 2025, Speirs appeared in the Adelaide Magistrates Court, where the Director of Public Prosecutions confirmed that two charges of supplying a controlled substance would proceed. The alleged offences occurred in August 2024, and Speirs was arrested in September after a video showed him snorting from a plate. At a hearing on 27 March 2025 he pleaded guilty to the charges, and was sentenced on 24 April 2025 to a $9,000 fine and 37.5 hours of community service. Speirs received two convictions, one for each charge.

== See also ==
- Shadow ministry of David Speirs

Political offices
Preceded by Ian Hunter as Minister for Sustainability, Environment and Conservation and as Minister for Water and the River Murray	Minister for Environment and Water; 2018–2022	Succeeded by Susan Close as Minister for Climate, Environment and Water
Preceded by Steven Marshall	Leader of the Opposition in South Australia; 2022–2024	Succeeded by Vincent Tarzia
South Australian House of Assembly
Preceded by Chloë Fox	Member for Bright; 2014–2018	District abolished
New seat	Member for Black; 2018–2024	Succeeded by Alex Dighton
Party political offices
Preceded by Steven Marshall	Leader of the Liberal Party of Australia (South Australian Division); 2022–2024	Succeeded by Vincent Tarzia
