= Alex Dighton =

Australian politician

Alex Dighton MHA

Member of the South Australian House of Assembly for Black
- Incumbent
- Assumed office 16 November 2024
- Preceded by: David Speirs

Personal details
- Born: Alexander Edward Dighton
- Party: Labor

Alexander Edward Dighton is an Australian politician who represents the electoral district of Black in the South Australian House of Assembly, as a member of the Labor Party.

== Background ==
Dighton is a school teacher and was previously the Deputy Principal at Sacred Heart College in Adelaide's west.

== Career ==
Dighton, a member of the Labor Right faction, had previously run in the Electorate of Black at the 2022 South Australian election. Despite Labor receiving a positive swing of 7%, Dighton lost to incumbent Liberal David Speirs.

After Speirs was charged with drug offences in September 2024, he resigned on 15 October 2024, triggering a by-election.

At the by-election, a large swing of 9.7% toward Labor occurred, with ABC election analyst Antony Green calling the result in favour of Dighton early that evening.

South Australian House of Assembly
Preceded by David Speirs	Member for Black; 2024–present	Incumbent
