= Electoral results for the district of Finniss =

South Australian district election results

This is a list of electoral results for the Electoral district of Finniss in South Australian state elections.

== Members for Finniss ==
Member	Party	Term
Dean Brown	Liberal	1993–2006
Michael Pengilly	Liberal	2006–2018
David Basham	Liberal	2018–2026
Lou Nicholson	Independent	2026-present

== Election results ==
=== Elections in the 2020s ===
==== 2026 ====
2026 South Australian state election: Finniss
Party	Candidate	Votes	%	±%
Liberal	David Basham	6,940	27.1	−15.9
One Nation	Greg Powell	5,842	22.9	+18.1
Labor	Phoebe Redington	4,725	18.5	−4.4
Independent	Lou Nicholson	4,617	18.1	−1.5
Greens	Bartholomew Astill-Pearce	1,603	6.3	−0.5
Independent	Bron Lewis	1,045	4.1	+4.1
Animal Justice	Tanya Hussey	417	1.6	+1.6
Australian Family	David Abram	264	1.0	+1.0
Fair Go	Michael Scott	98	0.4	+0.4
Total formal votes		25,551	95.4	−1.5
Informal votes		1,227	4.6	+1.5
Turnout		26,778	90.6	−1.5
Two-candidate-preferred result
Independent	Lou Nicholson	14,102	55.2	+5.9
Liberal	David Basham	11,449	44.8	−5.9
Independent gain from Liberal		Swing	+5.9	

==== 2022 ====
2022 South Australian state election: Finniss
Party	Candidate	Votes	%	±%
Liberal	David Basham	10,424	43.1	−0.4
Labor	Amy Hueppauff	5,532	22.9	+6.1
Independent	Lou Nicholson	4,728	19.6	+19.6
Greens	Anne Bourne	1,647	6.8	−0.9
One Nation	Carlos Quaremba	1,146	4.7	+4.7
Family First	Dominic Carli	614	2.5	+2.5
National	Joe Ienco	82	0.3	+0.3
Total formal votes		24,173	96.9	
Informal votes		778	3.1	
Turnout		24,951	92.1	
Notional two-party-preferred count
Liberal	David Basham	13,715	56.7	−12.0
Labor	Amy Hueppauff	10,458	43.3	+12.0
Two-candidate-preferred result
Liberal	David Basham	12,258	50.7	−13.7
Independent	Lou Nicholson	11,915	49.3	+49.3
Liberal hold				

Distribution of preferences: Finniss
Party	Candidate	Votes	Round 1		Round 2		Round 3		Round 4		Round 5	
Party	Candidate	Votes	Dist.	Total	Dist.	Total	Dist.	Total	Dist.	Total	Dist.	Total
Quota (50% + 1)		12,087										
Liberal	David Basham	10,424	+23	10,447	+130	10,577	+230	10,807	+164	10,971	+1,287	12,258
Labor	Amy Hueppauff	5,532	+4	5,536	+61	5,597	+128	5,725	+537	6,262	Excluded	
Independent	Lou Nicholson	4,728	+18	4,746	+174	4,920	+918	5,838	+1,102	6,940	+4,975	11,915
Greens	Anne Bourne	1,647	+10	1,657	+52	1,709	+94	1,803	Excluded			
One Nation	Carlos Quaremba	1,146	+17	1,163	+207	1,370	Excluded					
Family First	Dominic Carli	614	+10	624	Excluded							
National	Joe Ienco	82	Excluded									

=== Elections in the 2010s ===
==== 2018 ====
2018 South Australian state election: Finniss
Party	Candidate	Votes	%	±%
Liberal	David Basham	9,319	43.6	−8.6
SA-Best	Joe Hill	5,515	25.8	+25.8
Labor	Russell Skinner	3,648	17.1	−7.5
Greens	Marc Mullette	1,670	7.8	−4.3
Conservatives	Bruce Hicks	1,207	5.7	−4.9
Total formal votes		21,359	97.2	+0.1
Informal votes		626	2.8	−0.1
Turnout		21,985	92.3	+2.1
Two-party-preferred result
Liberal	David Basham	13,718	64.2	+1.1
Labor	Russell Skinner	7,641	35.8	−1.1
Two-candidate-preferred result
Liberal	David Basham	11,669	54.6	−8.5
SA-Best	Joe Hill	9,690	45.4	+45.4
Liberal hold				

2014 South Australian state election: Finniss
Party	Candidate	Votes	%	±%
Liberal	Michael Pengilly	11,674	52.9	+1.4
Labor	Melanie Smart	5,166	23.4	−6.8
Greens	Moira Jenkins	2,883	13.1	+4.5
Family First	Bruce Hicks	2,361	10.7	+2.1
Total formal votes		22,084	97.1	−0.6
Informal votes		648	2.9	+0.6
Turnout		22,732	92.6	−0.6
Two-party-preferred result
Liberal	Michael Pengilly	14,086	63.8	+2.6
Labor	Melanie Smart	7,998	36.2	−2.6
Liberal hold		Swing	+2.6	

2010 South Australian state election: Finniss
Party	Candidate	Votes	%	±%
Liberal	Michael Pengilly	10,450	51.5	+13.3
Labor	Mary-Louise Corcoran	6,134	30.2	−0.7
Family First	Bruce Hicks	1,736	8.6	+2.6
Greens	Diane Atkinson	1,733	8.5	+0.6
Independent	Maris Zalups	246	1.2	+1.2
Total formal votes		20,299	97.4	
Informal votes		472	2.6	
Turnout		20,771	93.2	
Two-party-preferred result
Liberal	Michael Pengilly	12,421	61.2	+5.8
Labor	Mary-Louise Corcoran	7,878	38.8	−5.8
Liberal hold		Swing	+5.8	

=== Elections in the 2000s ===
2006 South Australian state election: Finniss
Party	Candidate	Votes	%	±%
Liberal	Michael Pengilly	7,682	37.1	−18.8
Labor	Mary-Lou Corcoran	6,098	29.5	+7.8
National	Kym McHugh	3,622	17.5	+17.5
Greens	Douglas McCarty	1,586	7.7	+2.4
Family First	Dominic Carli	1,168	5.6	+0.5
Democrats	Kevin Bartolo	544	2.6	−6.2
Total formal votes		20,700	96.5	
Informal votes		674	3.5	
Turnout		21,374	93.5	
Two-party-preferred result
Liberal	Michael Pengilly	11,701	56.5	−9.1
Labor	Mary-Lou Corcoran	8,999	43.5	+9.1
Liberal hold		Swing	−9.1	

2002 South Australian state election: Finniss
Party	Candidate	Votes	%	±%
Liberal	Dean Brown	11,616	55.9	+0.3
Labor	Graham Hockley	4,435	21.3	+0.6
Democrats	John Lavers	1,895	9.1	−14.5
Greens	Matt Rigney	1,118	5.4	+5.4
Family First	Bill Megaritis	1,034	5.0	+5.0
One Nation	Joy Rayner	699	3.4	+3.4
Total formal votes		20,797	97.2	
Informal votes		609	2.8	
Turnout		21,406	94.4	
Two-party-preferred result
Liberal	Dean Brown	13,647	65.6	+8.1
Labor	Graham Hockley	7,150	34.4	+34.4
Liberal hold		Swing	N/A	

=== Elections in the 1990s ===
1997 South Australian state election: Finniss
Party	Candidate	Votes	%	±%
Liberal	Dean Brown	10,519	55.4	−13.3
Democrats	John Lavers	4,471	23.5	+12.9
Labor	David Detchon	4,007	21.1	+4.9
Total formal votes		18,997	96.1	−1.5
Informal votes		769	3.9	+1.5
Turnout		19,766	92.6	
Two-party-preferred result
Liberal	Dean Brown	12,523	65.9	−9.4
Labor	David Detchon	6,474	34.1	+9.4
Two-candidate-preferred result
Liberal	Dean Brown	10,890	57.3	−18.1
Democrats	John Lavers	8,107	42.7	+42.7
Liberal hold		Swing	N/A	

1993 South Australian state election: Finniss
Party	Candidate	Votes	%	±%
Liberal	Dean Brown	13,527	69.2	+10.5
Labor	Leesa Chesser	3,269	16.7	−9.6
Democrats	Richard McCarthy	2,196	11.2	−3.7
Natural Law	Andrew Wells	557	2.8	+2.8
Total formal votes		19,549	97.7	−0.4
Informal votes		467	2.3	+0.4
Turnout		20,016	92.8	
Two-party-preferred result
Liberal	Dean Brown	14,548	74.4	+9.0
Labor	Leesa Chesser	5,001	25.6	−9.0
Liberal hold		Swing	+9.0	
