= Electoral results for the district of Ramsay =

South Australian district election results

This is a list of electoral results for the Electoral district of Ramsay in South Australian state elections.

== Members for Ramsay ==
Member	Party	Term
Lynn Arnold	Labor Party	1985–1993
Mike Rann	Labor Party	1993–2012
Zoe Bettison	Labor Party	2012–present

== Election results ==
=== Elections in the 2020s ===
==== 2026 ====
2026 South Australian state election: Ramsay
Party	Candidate	Votes	%	±%
Labor	Zoe Bettison	10,896	49.0	−11.0
One Nation	Ralph Chambers	6,231	28.0	+28.0
Greens	Luke Skinner	1,791	8.1	+0.9
Liberal	Daryl McCann	1,386	6.2	−15.2
Legalise Cannabis	Mark Eckermann	769	3.5	+3.5
Family First	Luz Velasquez	683	3.1	−8.3
United Voice	Nic Owen	199	0.9	+0.9
Australian Family	Ashley Gaylor	178	0.8	+0.8
Fair Go	Leo Demitriou	107	0.5	+0.5
Total formal votes		22,240	93.6	−2.2
Informal votes		1,508	6.4	2.2
Turnout		23,748	83.5	−0.3
Two-candidate-preferred result
Labor	Zoe Bettison	13,996	62.9	−7.0
One Nation	Ralph Chambers	8,244	37.1	+37.1
Labor hold				

==== 2022 ====
2022 South Australian state election: Ramsay
Party	Candidate	Votes	%	±%
Labor	Zoe Bettison	13,401	60.0	+9.8
Liberal	Nicholas Charles	4,780	21.4	+5.5
Family First	Rolando See	2,556	11.4	+11.4
Greens	Dominique Lock	1,598	7.2	+1.3
Total formal votes		22,335	95.8	
Informal votes		968	4.2	
Turnout		23,303	83.8	
Two-party-preferred result
Labor	Zoe Bettison	15,620	69.9	+1.4
Liberal	Nicholas Charles	6,715	30.1	−1.4
Labor hold		Swing	+1.4	

Distribution of preferences: Ramsay
Party	Candidate	Votes	Round 1		Round 2	
Party	Candidate	Votes	Dist.	Total	Dist.	Total
Quota (50% + 1)		11,168				
Labor	Zoe Bettison	13,401	+886	14,287	+1,333	15,620
Liberal	Nicholas Charles	4,780	+214	4,994	+1,721	6,715
Family First	Roland See	2,556	+498	3,054	Excluded	
Greens	Dominique Lock	1,598	Excluded			

=== Elections in the 2010s ===
==== 2018 ====
2018 South Australian state election: Ramsay
Party	Candidate	Votes	%	±%
Labor	Zoe Bettison	11,055	49.6	−6.0
SA-Best	Tarnia George	4,090	18.3	+18.3
Liberal	Nick Charles	3,605	16.2	−9.3
Independent	Mark Aldridge	1,539	6.9	+6.9
Greens	Brett Ferris	1,082	4.9	−2.6
Conservatives	Domenico Ialeggio	936	4.2	−7.3
Total formal votes		22,307	93.6	−1.8
Informal votes		1,528	6.4	+1.8
Turnout		23,835	88.9	+3.3
Two-party-preferred result
Labor	Zoe Bettison	15,374	68.9	+1.2
Liberal	Nick Charles	6,933	31.1	−1.2
Two-candidate-preferred result
Labor	Zoe Bettison	14,600	65.5	−2.3
SA-Best	Tarnia George	7,707	34.5	+34.5
Labor hold				

2014 South Australian state election: Ramsay
Party	Candidate	Votes	%	±%
Labor	Zoe Bettison	11,283	56.1	−1.7
Liberal	Anthony Antoniadis	4,988	24.8	−0.2
Family First	Paul Coombe	2,347	11.7	+2.1
Greens	Brett Ferris	1,483	7.4	+2.8
Total formal votes		20,101	95.1	−0.6
Informal votes		1,041	4.9	+0.6
Turnout		21,142	90.8	−1.3
Two-party-preferred result
Labor	Zoe Bettison	13,742	68.4	+0.5
Liberal	Anthony Antoniadis	6,359	31.6	−0.5
Labor hold		Swing	+0.5	

Ramsay state by-election, 11 February 2012
Party	Candidate	Votes	%	±%
Labor	Zoe Bettison	8,843	54.6	–3.3
Independent Voice of the Community	Mark Aldridge	2,614	16.1	+16.1
Liberal Democrats	Christopher Steele	2,157	13.3	+13.3
Greens	Ruth Beach	1,072	6.6	+2.0
One Nation	Chris Walsh	563	3.5	+3.5
Independent Trevor Grace Save the Unborn	Trevor Grace	510	3.2	+3.2
FREE Australia	Mark Lena	430	2.7	+2.7
Total formal votes		16,189	90.4	–5.3
Informal votes		1,726	9.6	+5.3
Turnout		17,915	80.2	–11.9
Two-candidate-preferred result
Labor	Zoe Bettison	10,795	66.7	–1.3
Independent Voice of the Community	Mark Aldridge	5,394	33.3	+33.3
Labor hold		Swing	N/A	

2010 South Australian state election: Ramsay
Party	Candidate	Votes	%	±%
Labor	Mike Rann	11,446	57.9	−13.6
Liberal	David Balaza	4,927	24.9	+6.6
Family First	Dale Ramsey	1,900	9.6	+9.6
Greens	Paul Petit	903	4.6	−0.3
Democrats	Rod Steinert	587	3.0	−0.6
Total formal votes		19,763	95.3	
Informal votes		900	4.7	
Turnout		20,663	92.1	
Two-party-preferred result
Labor	Mike Rann	13,431	68.0	−10.5
Liberal	David Balaza	6,332	32.0	+10.5
Labor hold		Swing	−10.5	

=== Elections in the 2000s ===
2006 South Australian state election: Ramsay
Party	Candidate	Votes	%	±%
Labor	Mike Rann	13,753	71.5	+9.9
Liberal	Damien Pilkington	3,519	18.3	−5.1
Greens	David Nicks	938	4.9	+4.9
Democrats	Chris Calvert	693	3.6	−3.4
Independent	Colin Wuttke	324	1.7	+1.7
Total formal votes		19,227	95.4	−1.2
Informal votes		917	4.6	+1.2
Turnout		20,144	91.4	−1.9
Two-party-preferred result
Labor	Mike Rann	15,088	78.5	+8.3
Liberal	Damien Pilkington	4,139	21.5	−8.3
Labor hold		Swing	+8.3	

2002 South Australian state election: Ramsay
Party	Candidate	Votes	%	±%
Labor	Mike Rann	12,583	61.6	+6.2
Liberal	Phil Newton	4,785	23.4	+0.7
Democrats	Penelope Robertson	1,433	7.0	−9.0
SA First	Ona Trelbby	908	4.4	+4.4
One Nation	Dennis Murphy	715	3.5	+3.5
Total formal votes		20,424	96.6	
Informal votes		729	3.4	
Turnout		21,153	93.3	
Two-party-preferred result
Labor	Mike Rann	14,343	70.2	+1.2
Liberal	Phil Newton	6,081	29.8	−1.2
Labor hold		Swing	+1.2	

=== Elections in the 1990s ===
1997 South Australian state election: Ramsay
Party	Candidate	Votes	%	±%
Labor	Mike Rann	9,757	55.0	+0.7
Liberal	Phil Newton	4,011	22.6	−12.3
Democrats	Matilda Bawden	2,835	16.0	+5.3
United Australia	Wayne Schultz	569	3.2	+3.2
National Action	Tony Michalski	553	3.1	+3.1
Total formal votes		17,725	94.3	−2.1
Informal votes		1,062	5.7	+2.1
Turnout		18,787	92.5	
Two-party-preferred result
Labor	Mike Rann	12,086	68.2	+7.9
Liberal	Phil Newton	5,639	31.8	−7.9
Labor hold		Swing	+7.9	

1993 South Australian state election: Ramsay
Party	Candidate	Votes	%	±%
Labor	Mike Rann	10,800	54.1	−2.5
Liberal	Philip Newton	7,055	35.3	+4.7
Democrats	Philip Newey	2,110	10.6	−1.1
Total formal votes		19,965	96.6	+0.5
Informal votes		699	3.4	−0.5
Turnout		20,664	93.9	
Two-party-preferred result
Labor	Mike Rann	11,966	59.9	−3.8
Liberal	Philip Newton	7,999	40.1	+3.8
Labor hold		Swing	−3.8	

=== Elections in the 1980s ===
1989 South Australian state election: Ramsay
Party	Candidate	Votes	%	±%
Labor	Lynn Arnold	13,369	60.6	−13.6
Liberal	Brenda Bates	6,233	28.2	+2.4
Democrats	Shylie Holden	2,465	11.2	+11.2
Total formal votes		22,067	96.0	+0.6
Informal votes		921	4.0	−0.6
Turnout		22,988	94.5	−0.9
Two-party-preferred result
Labor	Lynn Arnold	14,728	66.7	−7.5
Liberal	Brenda Bates	7,339	33.3	+7.5
Labor hold		Swing	−7.5	

1985 South Australian state election: Ramsay
Party	Candidate	Votes	%	±%
Labor	Lynn Arnold	12,959	74.2	+3.2
Liberal	Jim Davis	4,516	25.8	+3.8
Total formal votes		17,475	95.4	
Informal votes		839	4.6	
Turnout		18,314	93.5	
Labor hold		Swing	+0.2	
