= Results of the 2026 South Australian state election =

Results of the 2026 South Australian state election may refer to

- 2026 South Australian House of Assembly election
- 2026 South Australian Legislative Council election
