= 2026 South Australian House of Assembly election =

2026 South Australian state election (House of Assembly)
- 21 March 2026
- All 47 seats in the South Australian House of Assembly; 24 seats needed for a majority
- Turnout: 1,167,715 (88.7%)
Party	Leader	Vote %	Seats	+/–
Labor	Peter Malinauskas	37.5	34	+7
Liberal	Ashton Hurn	18.9	5	−11
One Nation	Cory Bernardi	22.9	4	+4
Independents	N/A	5.5	4	0
This lists parties that won seats. See the complete results below.
Map of House of Assembly electorates.
Premier before	Premier after
Peter Malinauskas; Labor	Peter Malinauskas; Labor

The 2026 South Australian House of Assembly election was held on 21 March 2026 to elect all 47 members of the South Australian House of Assembly as part of the 2026 South Australian state election.

== Retiring members ==
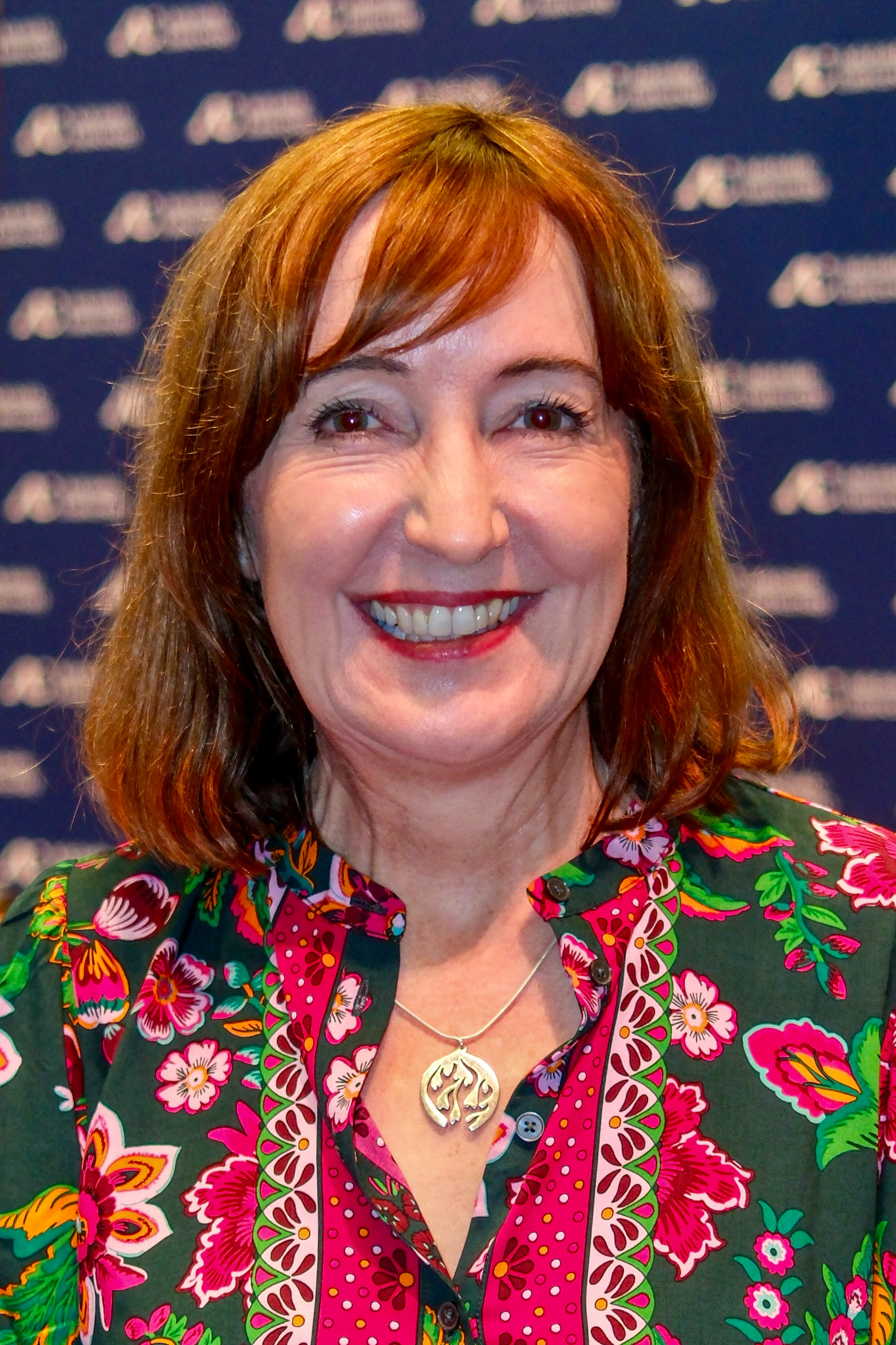
Susan Close; Deputy Premier (2022–2025)

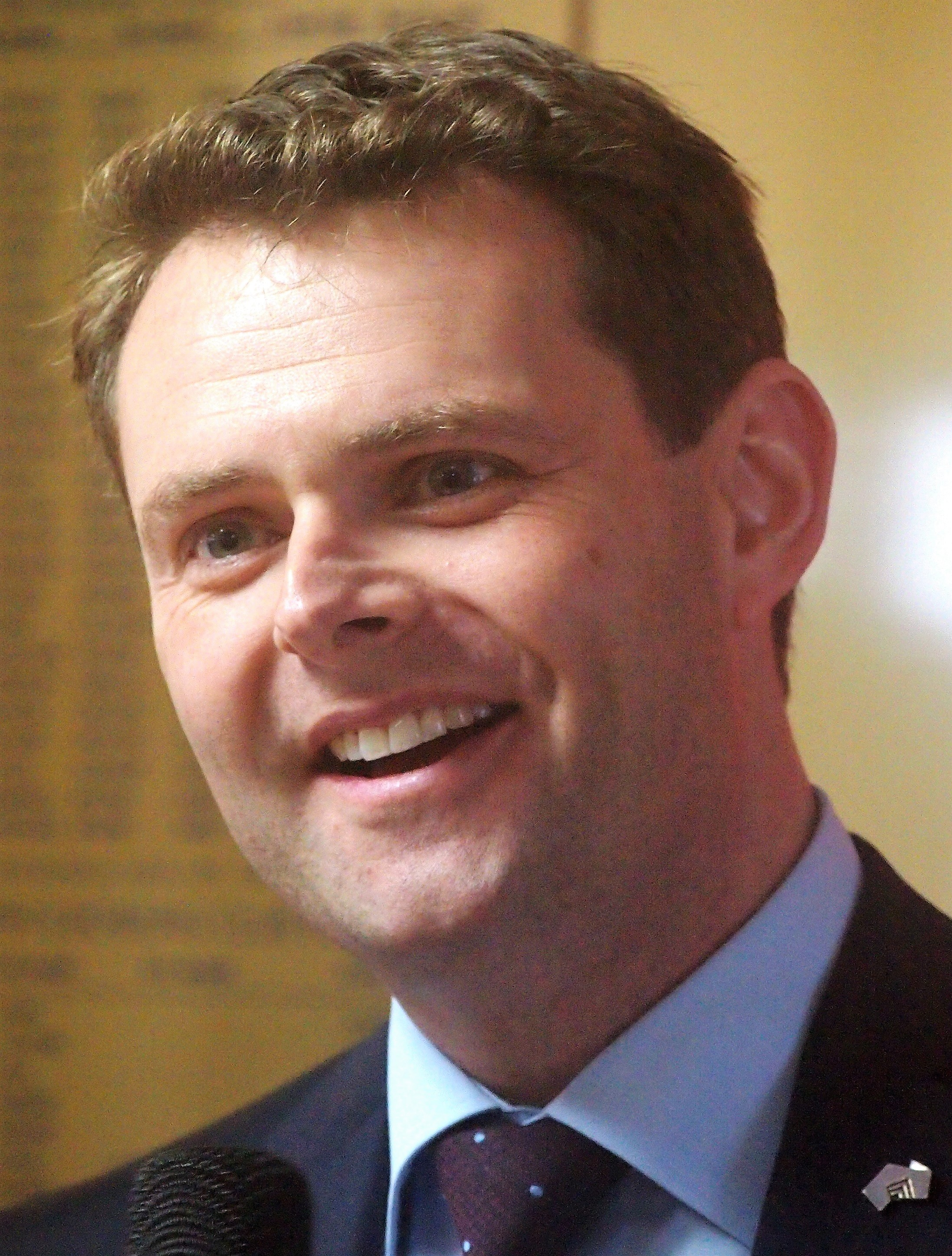
Stephen Mullighan; Treasurer (2022–2025)

=== Labor ===
- Susan Close MP (Port Adelaide) – announced 18 September 2025
- Stephen Mullighan MP (Lee) – announced 18 September 2025
- Lee Odenwalder MP (Elizabeth) – announced 9 October 2025
- Dana Wortley MP (Torrens) – announced 9 October 2025
- Leon Bignell MP (Mawson) – announced 27 November 2025
- Andrea Michaels MP (Enfield) – announced 30 January 2026

=== Liberal ===
- David Pisoni MP (Unley) – announced 8 October 2024
- John Gardner MP (Morialta) – announced 13 December 2024
- Matt Cowdrey MP (Colton) – announced 27 June 2025

=== Independent ===
- Dan Cregan MP (Kavel) – announced 28 January 2025
- Troy Bell MP (Mount Gambier) – resigned 1 September 2025. Seat left vacant.

== Overall results ==
Government (34) Labor (34) Opposition (5) Liberal (5) Crossbench (8) One Nation (4) Independent (4) (Note: Independent MPs: Geoff Brock (Stuart), Matt Schultz (Kavel), Travis Fatchen (Mount Gambier), and Lou Nicholson (Finniss).)

House of Assembly (IRV) – Turnout 88.5% (CV)
Party	Primary votes			Seats	
Party	Votes	%	Swing (pp)	Seats	Change
Labor	418,255	37.5	–2.4	34	▲7
One Nation	255,264	22.9	+20.3	4	▲4
Liberal	211,125	18.9	–16.8	5	▼11
Greens	115,723	10.4	+1.3	0	Steady
Independent	60,949	5.5	–3.0	4	Steady
Family First	19,497	1.7	–1.5	0	Steady
Legalise Cannabis	10,878	1.0	New	0	Steady
Australian Family	9,257	0.8	+0.6	0	Steady
Animal Justice	5,531	0.5	+0.4	0	Steady
Real Change	2,965	0.3	+0.2	0	Steady
Fair Go	2,680	0.2	New	0	Steady
United Voice	2,057	0.2	New	0	Steady
National	1,426	0.1	–0.2	0	Steady
SA Best	257	0.0	–0.2	0	Steady
Total	1,115,864	100.0		47	
Informal votes	50,332	4.3	+0.7		
Turnout	1,166,196	88.5	–0.7		
Enrolled voters	1,317,186				
Source: Electoral Commission of South Australia

=== Two-party-preferred vote ===
In Australian politics, the two-party-preferred vote is the result of an election in which preferences are distributed between the two major parties, being, in South Australia, the Labor Party and the Liberal Party. However, due to the overperformance of One Nation, the Electoral Commission of South Australia did not calculate a state-wide two-party-preferred vote. As such, a number of psephologists and polling firms have estimated the two-party-preferred vote based on known preference flows between parties.

Of the 47 two-candidate-preferred contests, 25 were Labor–One Nation, 13 were Labor–Liberal, four were Liberal–One Nation, two were One Nation–Independent, and there was one matchup each of Labor–Greens, Liberal–Independent, and Labor–Independent.

Antony Green, the ABC's former chief elections analyst, calculated a two-party-preferred vote between Labor and "Non-Labor". This was estimated at 55.7–44.3 in favour of the Labor Party, a 1.1 pp swing towards them since the 2022 election. He noted that given how poorly the Liberals polled, Labor likely would've polled above 58% in a traditional two-party contest. At the time of publication, full preference flow data was not yet available, but the published distribution of preferences had Greens preferences flowing 80–85% to Labor, One Nation preferences flowed 65–70% to Liberal, and Liberal preferences flowing 55–65% to One Nation.

Kevin Bonham estimated both a Labor–Liberal and a Labor–One Nation two-party-preferred vote. In a classic two-party contest, he had Labor winning 57.9–42.1, a swing of 3.3 pp. An estimated "shadow 2PP" had an even larger margin of victory for the Labor Party at 58.2–41.8 over One Nation. He referred to his methodology as the "actual distribution method", where if one of the two-party-preferred sides is excluded during the count, the total up until that point is credited, with any votes beyond that point having their preference flows estimated. These estimations were that in a contest with the Liberal Party, Labor received 27.2% of One Nation preferences, 85.9% of Greens preferences, and 50.8% of independent preferences. In a contest with One Nation, Labor received 33.9% of Liberal preferences, 84.8% of Greens preferences, and 55.9% of Independent preferences.

In their first opinion poll following the state election, DemosAU calculated a two-party-preferred vote between Labor and One Nation of 58.1–41.9. No two-party-preferred was calculated with the Liberal Party, whose preferences were distributed 66.6% in favour of One Nation. Greens preferences were 80.4% in favour of Labor, and "others" were distributed 57.9% to Labor.

Preference flow estimates
From party	Two-party-preferred		
From party	ALP	LIB	ONP
Antony Green (9 April 2026)
One Nation	31.1%	68.9%	—N/a
Liberal	34.5%	—N/a	65.5%
Greens	84.5%	15.5%	—N/a
Greens	80.4%	—N/a	19.6%
Kevin Bonham (10 April 2026)
One Nation	27.2%	72.8%	—N/a
Liberal	33.9%	—N/a	66.1%
Greens	85.9%	14.1%	—N/a
Greens	84.8%	—N/a	15.2%
Independent	50.8%	49.2%	—N/a
Independent	55.9%	—N/a	44.1%
DemosAU (26 June 2026)
Liberal	33.4%	—N/a	66.6%
Greens	80.4%	—N/a	19.6%
Others	57.9%	—N/a	42.1%

== Results by district ==
=== Adelaide ===
2026 South Australian state election: Adelaide
Party	Candidate	Votes	%	±%
Labor	Lucy Hood	10,189	42.6	+2.0
Liberal	Julian Amato	5,084	21.3	−18.5
Greens	Bronte Colmer	3,531	14.8	+1.3
One Nation	Aoi Baxter (disendorsed)	2,771	11.6	+11.6
Independent	Keiran Snape	2,002	8.4	+8.4
Australian Family	Dan Casey	317	1.3	−1.0
Total formal votes		23,894	97.6	±0.0
Informal votes		591	2.4	±0.0
Turnout		24,485	87.3	+0.4
Two-party-preferred result
Labor	Lucy Hood	16,307	68.2	+12.1
Liberal	Julian Amato	7,587	31.8	−12.1
Labor hold		Swing	+12.1	

Distribution of preferences: Adelaide
Party	Candidate	Votes	Round 1		Round 2		Round 3		Round 4	
Party	Candidate	Votes	Dist.	Total	Dist.	Total	Dist.	Total	Dist.	Total
Quota (50% + 1)		11,948								
Labor	Lucy Hood	10,189	+54	10,243	+472	10,715	+791	11,506	+4,801	16,307
Liberal	Julian Amato	5,084	+71	5,155	+302	5,457	+1,800	7,257	+330	7,587
Greens	Bronte Colmer	3,531	+27	3,558	+1,138	4,696	+435	5,131	Excluded	
One Nation	Aoi Baxter	2,771	+137	2,908	+118	3,026	Excluded			
Independent	Keiran Snape	2,002	+28	2,030	Excluded					
Australian Family	Dan Casey	317	Excluded							

=== Badcoe ===
2026 South Australian state election: Badcoe
Party	Candidate	Votes	%	±%
Labor	Jayne Stinson	11,508	49.0	−1.0
One Nation	Daniel Shepherd	4,181	17.8	+14.7
Greens	Josh Andersen-Ward	3,889	16.6	+5.1
Liberal	Amar Singh	3,240	13.8	−15.4
Family First	Radosav Jovanovic	469	2.0	+0.2
Australian Family	Jonathan Attard	183	0.8	−1.3
Total formal votes		23,470	97.4	+1.2
Informal votes		619	2.6	−1.2
Turnout		24,089	88.1	−1.0
Two-party-preferred result
Labor	Jayne Stinson	16,700	71.2	+6.4
One Nation	Daniel Shepherd	6,770	28.8	+28.8
Labor hold				

Distribution of preferences: Badcoe
Party	Candidate	Votes	Round 1		Round 2		Round 3		Round 4	
Party	Candidate	Votes	Dist.	Total	Dist.	Total	Dist.	Total	Dist.	Total
Quota (50% + 1)		11,736								
Labor	Jayne Stinson	11,508	+24	11,532	+115	11,647	+917	12,564	+4,136	16,700
One Nation	Daniel Shepherd	4,181	+27	4,208	+198	4,406	+1,980	6,386	+384	6,770
Greens	Josh Andersen-Ward	3,889	+32	3,921	+114	4,035	+485	4,520	Excluded	
Liberal	Amar Singh	3,240	+11	3,251	+131	3,382	Excluded			
Family First	Radosav Jovanovic	469	+89	558	Excluded					
Australian Family	Jonathan Attard	183	Excluded							

=== Black ===
2026 South Australian state election: Black
Party	Candidate	Votes	%	±%
Labor	Alex Dighton	10,286	43.0	+4.8
One Nation	Paula Wilson	4,469	18.7	+18.7
Independent	David Speirs	3,317	13.9	+13.9
Greens	Sarah Luscombe	2,929	12.2	+0.5
Liberal	Rhees Bishop	2,475	10.3	−39.7
Family First	Dianne Squirrell	271	1.1	+1.1
Fair Go	Jennifer Game	107	0.4	+0.4
Australian Family	Jethro Attard	76	0.3	+0.3
Total formal votes		23,930	96.5	−0.8
Informal votes		863	3.5	+0.8
Turnout		24,793	92.9	+0.9
Two-party-preferred result
Labor	Alex Dighton	15,647	65.4	+18.1
One Nation	Paula Wilson	8,283	34.6	+34.6
Labor notional gain from Liberal				

Distribution of preferences: Black
Party	Candidate	Votes	Round 1		Round 2		Round 3		Round 4		Round 5		Round 6	
Party	Candidate	Votes	Dist.	Total	Dist.	Total	Dist.	Total	Dist.	Total	Dist.	Total	Dist.	Total
Quota (50% + 1)		11,966												
Labor	Alex Dighton	10,286	+8	10,294	+12	10,306	+39	10,345	+467	10,812	+2,344	13,156	+2,491	15,647
One Nation	Paula Wilson	4,469	+7	4,476	+29	4,505	+133	4,638	+1,267	5,905	+369	6,274	+2,009	8,283
Independent	David Speirs	3,317	+7	3,324	+15	3,339	+58	3,397	+545	3,942	+558	4,500	Excluded	
Greens	Sarah Luscombe	2,929	+9	2,938	+20	2,958	+47	3,005	+266	3,271	Excluded			
Liberal	Rhees Bishop	2,475	+3	2,478	+16	2,494	+51	2,545	Excluded					
Family First	Dianne Squirrell	271	+32	303	+25	328	Excluded							
Fair Go	Jennifer Game	107	+10	117	Excluded									
Australian Family	Jethro Attard	76	Excluded											

=== Bragg ===
2026 South Australian state election: Bragg
Party	Candidate	Votes	%	±%
Liberal	Jack Batty	11,684	48.3	−5.4
Labor	Rick Sarre	6,814	28.2	−0.4
Greens	Susan Ditter	3,219	13.3	+0.7
One Nation	Russell Paterson	2,211	9.1	+9.1
Australian Family	Robert Walker	242	1.0	+1.0
Total formal votes		24,170	98.4	+0.2
Informal votes		386	1.6	−0.2
Turnout		23,832	91.4	+1.0
Two-party-preferred result
Liberal	Jack Batty	14,145	58.5	+0.4
Labor	Rick Sarre	10,025	41.5	−0.4
Liberal hold		Swing	+0.4	

Distribution of preferences: Bragg
Party	Candidate	Votes	Round 1		Round 2		Round 3	
Party	Candidate	Votes	Dist.	Total	Dist.	Total	Dist.	Total
Quota (50% + 1)		12,086						
Liberal	Jack Batty	11,684	+44	11,728	+1,718	13,446	+699	14,145
Labor	Rick Sarre	6,814	+82	6,896	+316	7,212	+2,813	10,025
Greens	Susan Ditter	3,219	+32	3,251	+261	3,512	Excluded	
One Nation	Russell Paterson	2,211	+84	2,295	Excluded			
Australian Family	Robert Walker	242	Excluded					

=== Chaffey ===
2026 South Australian state election: Chaffey
Party	Candidate	Votes	%	±%
Liberal	Tim Whetstone	7,839	35.4	−19.2
One Nation	Jenny Troeth	7,506	33.9	+24.0
Labor	Oscar Harding	3,420	15.4	−4.5
Greens	Alice Kuersch	1,018	4.6	−1.5
Independent	Jason Perrin	842	3.8	+3.8
Australian Family	Tim Oakley	593	2.7	+2.7
Legalise Cannabis	Jeff Knipe	550	2.5	+2.5
National	Imelda Adamson Agars	190	0.9	−4.9
Independent	Jakob Gamertsfelder	183	0.8	+0.8
Total formal votes		22,141	94.2	−1.3
Informal votes		1,367	5.8	+1.3
Turnout		23,508	88.1	−1.4
Two-party-preferred result
Liberal	Tim Whetstone	15,182	68.6	+1.4
Labor	Oscar Harding	6,959	31.4	−1.4
Two-candidate-preferred result
Liberal	Tim Whetstone	12,392	56.0	−11.2
One Nation	Jenny Troeth	9,749	44.0	+44.0
Liberal hold				

Distribution of preferences: Chaffey
Party	Candidate	Votes	Round 1		Round 2		Round 3		Round 4		Round 5		Round 6		Round 7	
Party	Candidate	Votes	Dist.	Total	Dist.	Total	Dist.	Total	Dist.	Total	Dist.	Total	Dist.	Total	Dist.	Total
Quota (50% + 1)		11,071														
Liberal	Tim Whetstone	7,839	+17	7,856	+59	7,915	+94	8,009	+163	8,172	+165	8,337	+750	9,087	+3,305	12,392
One Nation	Jenny Troeth	7,506	+26	7,532	+38	7,570	+143	7,713	+105	7,818	+159	7,977	+410	8,387	+1,362	9,749
Labor	Oscar Harding	3,420	+44	3,464	+7	3,471	+84	3,555	+63	3,618	+612	4,230	+437	4,667	Excluded	
Greens	Alice Kuersch	1,018	+14	1,032	+12	1,044	+113	1,157	+78	1,235	Excluded					
Independent	Jason Perrin	842	+52	894	+35	929	+70	999	+299	1,298	+299	1,597	Excluded			
Australian Family	Tim Oakley	593	+15	608	+32	640	+68	708	Excluded							
Legalise Cannabis	Jeff Knipe	550	+13	563	+9	572	Excluded									
National	Imelda Adamson Agars	190	+2	192	Excluded											
Independent	Jakob Gamertsfelder	183	Excluded													

=== Cheltenham ===
2026 South Australian state election: Cheltenham
Party	Candidate	Votes	%	±%
Labor	Joe Szakacs	11,434	47.8	−7.7
One Nation	Melissa Higgins	5,045	21.1	+21.1
Greens	Steffi Medrow	3,159	13.2	+2.4
Liberal	Helen Pike	2,195	9.2	−15.3
Independent	Kosta Hadjimarkou	809	3.4	+3.4
Family First	Alex Tennikoff	569	2.4	−4.1
Fair Go	Karoline Brown	418	1.7	+1.7
Australian Family	John Martin	281	1.2	+1.2
Total formal votes		23,910	95.1	−1.2
Informal votes		1,225	4.9	+1.2
Turnout		25,135	87.8	−0.3
Two-party-preferred result
Labor	Joe Szakacs	16,028	67.0	−2.0
One Nation	Melissa Higgins	7,882	33.0	+33.0
Labor hold				

Distribution of preferences: Cheltenham
Party	Candidate	Votes	Round 1		Round 2		Round 3		Round 4		Round 5		Round 6	
Party	Candidate	Votes	Dist.	Total	Dist.	Total	Dist.	Total	Dist.	Total	Dist.	Total	Dist.	Total
Quota (50% + 1)		11,956												
Labor	Joe Szakacs	11,434	+29	11,463	+34	11,497	+138	11,635	+249	11,884	+799	12,683	+3,345	16,028
One Nation	Melissa Higgins	5,045	+24	5,069	+87	5,156	+138	5,294	+337	5,631	+1,331	6,962	+920	7,882
Greens	Steffi Medrow	3,159	+51	3,210	+254	3,464	+118	3,582	+221	3,803	+462	4,265	Excluded	
Liberal	Helen Pike	2,195	+13	2,208	+53	2,261	+105	2,366	+226	2,592	Excluded			
Independent	Kosta Hadjimarkou	809	+17	826	+22	848	+185	1,033	Excluded					
Family First	Alex Tennikoff	569	+86	655	+29	684	Excluded							
Fair Go	Karoline Brown	418	+61	479	Excluded									
Australian Family	John Martin	281	Excluded											

=== Colton ===
2026 South Australian state election: Colton
Party	Candidate	Votes	%	±%
Labor	Aria Bolkus	10,988	44.2	+7.4
Liberal	Bec Sutton	6,047	24.3	−27.9
One Nation	Rocco DeAngelis	4,407	17.7	+17.7
Greens	Adelaide Xerri	2,087	8.4	−2.5
Independent	Jake Hall-Evans	441	1.8	+1.8
Animal Justice	Lili Parsons	309	1.2	+1.2
Family First	Mathew Schulz	297	1.2	+1.2
Real Change	Brad Lloyd	140	0.6	+0.6
Australian Family	Tony Schirripa	118	0.5	+0.5
Total formal votes		24,834	95.6	−1.9
Informal votes		1,150	4.4	+1.9
Turnout		25,984	90.5	−0.6
Two-party-preferred result
Labor	Aria Bolkus	14,869	59.9	+14.7
Liberal	Bec Sutton	9,965	40.1	−14.7
Labor gain from Liberal		Swing	+14.7	

Distribution of preferences: Colton
Party	Candidate	Votes	Round 1		Round 2		Round 3		Round 4		Round 5		Round 6		Round 7	
Party	Candidate	Votes	Dist.	Total	Dist.	Total	Dist.	Total	Dist.	Total	Dist.	Total	Dist.	Total	Dist.	Total
Quota (50% + 1)		12,418														
Labor	Aria Bolkus	10,988	+24	11,012	+38	11,050	+56	11,106	+51	11,157	+126	11,283	+2,007	13,290	+1,579	14,869
Liberal	Bec Sutton	6,047	+8	6,055	+24	6,079	+29	6,108	+77	6,185	+193	6,378	+291	6,669	+3,296	9,965
One Nation	Rocco DeAngelis	4,407	+35	4,442	+15	4,457	+52	4,509	+142	4,651	+92	4,743	+132	4,875	Excluded	
Greens	Adelaide Xerri	2,087	+5	2,092	+28	2,120	+122	2,242	+44	2,286	+144	2,430	Excluded			
Independent	Jake Hall-Evans	441	+4	445	+24	469	+33	502	+53	555	Excluded					
Animal Justice	Lili Parsons	309	+4	313	+5	318	Excluded									
Family First	Mathew Schulz	297	+37	334	+7	341	+26	367	Excluded							
Real Change	Brad Lloyd	140	+1	141	Excluded											
Australian Family	Tony Schirripa	118	Excluded													

=== Croydon ===
2026 South Australian state election: Croydon
Party	Candidate	Votes	%	±%
Labor	Peter Malinauskas	12,774	55.4	−5.4
One Nation	Dale Blackeby	2,934	12.7	+12.7
Greens	Ruby Dolling	2,686	11.6	−0.7
Liberal	Michael Santagata	1,797	7.8	−14.7
Independent Socialist	Ahmed Azhar	1,308	5.7	+5.7
Family First	Hieu Pham	1,017	4.4	+4.4
Animal Justice	Suzanne Pope	334	1.4	−3.0
Australian Family	Joey Elms	122	0.5	+0.5
United Voice	Daniel Bettinelli	84	0.4	+0.4
Total formal votes		23,056	95.0	−1.6
Informal votes		1,208	5.0	+1.6
Turnout		24,264	83.7	−1.3
Two-party-preferred result
Labor	Peter Malinauskas	18,350	79.7	+4.9
One Nation	Dale Blackeby	4,688	20.3	+20.3
Two-candidate-preferred result
Labor	Peter Malinauskas	17,067	74.0	−0.7
Greens	Ruby Dolling	5,989	26.0	+26.0
Labor hold				

Distribution of preferences: Croydon
Party	Candidate	Votes	Round 1		Round 2		Round 3		Round 4		Round 5		Round 6		Round 7	
Party	Candidate	Votes	Dist.	Total	Dist.	Total	Dist.	Total	Dist.	Total	Dist.	Total	Dist.	Total	Dist.	Total
Quota (50% + 1)		11,529														
Labor	Peter Malinauskas	12,774	+14	12,788	+14	12,802	+55	12,857	+488	13,345	+345	13,690	+767	14,457	+2,610	17,067
One Nation	Dale Blackeby	2,934	+11	2,945	+17	2,962	+41	3,003	+244	3,247	+78	3,325	+905	4,230	Excluded	
Greens	Ruby Dolling	2,686	+8	2,694	+14	2,708	+202	2,910	+103	3,013	+983	3,996	+373	4,369	+1,620	5,989
Liberal	Michael Santagata	1,797	+7	1,804	+14	1,818	+20	1,838	+127	1,965	+80	2,045	Excluded			
Independent Socialist	Ahmed Azhar	1,308	+7	1,315	+6	1,321	+27	1,348	+138	1,486	Excluded					
Family First	Hieu Pham	1,017	+9	1,026	+42	1,068	+32	1,100	Excluded							
Animal Justice	Suzanne Pope	334	+7	341	+36	377	Excluded									
Australian Family	Joey Elms	122	+21	143	Excluded											
United Voice	Daniel Bettinelli	84	Excluded													

=== Davenport ===
2026 South Australian state election: Davenport
Party	Candidate	Votes	%	±%
Labor	Erin Thompson	11,829	48.6	+7.8
One Nation	Jon Howell	4,921	20.2	+20.2
Liberal	Trent Burnard	3,601	14.8	−26.4
Greens	John Photakis	2,737	11.2	+1.8
Independent	Dan Golding	718	2.9	−5.6
Family First	Mathew Francis	400	1.6	+1.6
Australian Family	Rachel Smith	147	0.6	+0.6
Total formal votes		24,353	97.4	−0.2
Informal votes		648	2.6	+0.2
Turnout		25,001	91.7	−0.3
Two-party-preferred result
Labor	Erin Thompson	16,171	66.4	+13.0
One Nation	Jonathan Howell	8,182	33.6	+33.6
Labor hold				

Distribution of preferences: Davenport
Party	Candidate	Votes	Round 1		Round 2		Round 3		Round 4		Round 5	
Party	Candidate	Votes	Dist.	Total	Dist.	Total	Dist.	Total	Dist.	Total	Dist.	Total
Quota (50% + 1)		12,177										
Labor	Erin Thompson	11,829	+43	11,872	+86	11,958	+249	12,207	+2,601	14,808	+1,363	16,171
One Nation	Jon Howell	4,921	+13	4,934	+202	5,136	+149	5,285	+194	5,479	+2,703	8,182
Liberal	Trent Burnard	3,601	+6	3,607	+89	3,696	+131	3,827	+239	4,066	Excluded	
Greens	John Photakis	2,737	+7	2,744	+39	2,783	+251	3,034	Excluded			
Independent	Dan Golding	718	+8	726	+54	780	Excluded					
Family First	Mathew Francis	400	+70	470	Excluded							
Australian Family	Rachel Smith	147	Excluded									

=== Dunstan ===
2026 South Australian state election: Dunstan
Party	Candidate	Votes	%	±%
Labor	Cressida O'Hanlon	8,824	37.9	+2.7
Liberal	Anna Finizio	6,593	28.3	−18.4
Greens	Christel Mex	3,839	16.5	+2.8
One Nation	Victoria Pollifrone	2,725	11.7	+11.7
Independent	Ian McBryde	443	1.9	+1.9
Animal Justice	Miranda Smith	429	1.8	+1.8
Family First	Fiona Leslie	276	1.2	−3.3
Australian Family	Nick Zollo	94	0.4	+0.4
Fair Go	Ricci Stanley	82	0.4	+0.4
Total formal votes		23,305	96.0	−2.2
Informal votes		974	4.0	+2.2
Turnout		24,279	89.8	+0.1
Two-party-preferred result
Labor	Cressida O'Hanlon	13,532	58.1	+8.6
Liberal	Anna Finizio	9,773	41.9	−8.6
Labor notional gain from Liberal		Swing	+8.6	

Distribution of preferences: Dunstan
Party	Candidate	Votes	Round 1		Round 2		Round 3		Round 4		Round 5		Round 6		Round 7	
Party	Candidate	Votes	Dist.	Total	Dist.	Total	Dist.	Total	Dist.	Total	Dist.	Total	Dist.	Total	Dist.	Total
Quota (50% + 1)		11,653														
Labor	Cressida O'Hanlon	8,824	+8	8,832	+3	8,835	+37	8,872	+60	8,932	+118	9,050	+516	9,566	+3,966	13,532
Liberal	Anna Finizio	6,593	+13	6,606	+13	6,619	+79	6,698	+39	6,737	+129	6,866	+2,158	9,024	+749	9,773
Greens	Christel Mex	3,839	+6	3,845	+3	3,848	+26	3,874	+187	4,061	+218	4,279	+436	4,715	Excluded	
One Nation	Victoria Pollifrone	2,725	+39	2,764	+18	2,782	+118	2,900	+120	3,020	+90	3,110	Excluded			
Independent	Ian McBryde	443	+4	447	+10	457	+42	499	+56	555	Excluded					
Animal Justice	Miranda Smith	429	+2	431	+11	442	+20	462	Excluded							
Family First	Fiona Leslie	276	+6	282	+40	322	Excluded									
Australian Family	Nick Zollo	94	+4	98	Excluded											
Fair Go	Ricci Stanley	82	Excluded													

=== Elder ===
2026 South Australian state election: Elder
Party	Candidate	Votes	%	±%
Labor	Nadia Clancy	12,364	50.2	+6.8
Liberal	Shawn van Groesen	4,450	18.1	−20.0
Greens	Stef Rozitis	3,569	14.5	+4.6
One Nation	Matt Mangelsdorf	3,540	14.4	+14.4
Family First	Rosanne Walston-Leo	399	1.6	−0.9
Fair Go	Linda Cheng	178	0.7	+0.7
Australian Family	Robert Lonie	139	0.6	+0.6
Total formal votes		24,639	97.1	+0.3
Informal votes		737	2.9	−0.3
Turnout		25,376	90.6	−0.1
Two-party-preferred result
Labor	Nadia Clancy	17,032	69.1	+13.5
Liberal	Shawn van Groesen	7,607	30.9	−13.5
Labor hold		Swing	+13.5	

Distribution of preferences: Elder
Party	Candidate	Votes	Round 1		Round 2		Round 3		Round 4		Round 5	
Party	Candidate	Votes	Dist.	Total	Dist.	Total	Dist.	Total	Dist.	Total	Dist.	Total
Quota (50% + 1)		12,320										
Labor	Nadia Clancy	12,364	+15	12,379	+28	12,407	+110	12,517	+3,199	15,716	+1,316	17,032
Liberal	Shawn van Groesen	4,450	+14	4,464	+35	4,499	+147	4,646	+315	4,961	+2,646	7,607
Greens	Stef Rozitis	3,569	+12	3,581	+42	3,623	+84	3,707	Excluded			
One Nation	Matt Mangelsdorf	3,540	+15	3,555	+43	3,598	+171	3,769	+193	3,962	Excluded	
Family First	Rosanne Walston-Leo	399	+73	472	+40	512	Excluded					
Fair Go	Linda Cheng	178	+10	188	Excluded							
Australian Family	Robert Lonie	139	Excluded									

=== Elizabeth ===
Electoral district results by polling booths

2026 South Australian state election: Elizabeth
Party	Candidate	Votes	%	±%
Labor	Ella Shaw	8,506	39.9	−15.7
One Nation	Kym Hanton	7,090	33.3	+23.4
Greens	David Deex	2,208	10.4	+2.6
Liberal	Dawid Jurczak	1,368	6.4	−12.1
Family First	Sanja Hendrick	887	4.2	−3.6
Legalise Cannabis	Matthew Field	729	3.4	+3.4
Australian Family	Brae McKee	197	0.9	+0.9
Fair Go	Angela Rojas	174	0.8	+0.8
United Voice	Marco Lorenzi	147	0.7	+0.7
Total formal votes		21,306	93.0	−3.1
Informal votes		1,602	7.0	+3.1
Turnout		22,908	80.9	−2.0
Two-party-preferred result
Labor	Ella Shaw	11,607	54.5	−17.2
One Nation	Kym Hanton	9,699	45.5	+45.5
Labor hold				

Distribution of preferences: Elizabeth
Party	Candidate	Votes	Round 1		Round 2		Round 3		Round 4		Round 5		Round 6		Round 7	
Party	Candidate	Votes	Dist.	Total	Dist.	Total	Dist.	Total	Dist.	Total	Dist.	Total	Dist.	Total	Dist.	Total
Quota (50% + 1)		10,654														
Labor	Ella Shaw	8,506	+8	8,514	+35	8,549	+81	8,630	+181	8,811	+281	9,092	+448	9,540	+2,067	11,607
One Nation	Kym Hanton	7,090	+25	7,115	+23	7,138	+24	7,162	+191	7,353	+395	7,748	+926	8,674	+1,025	9,699
Greens	David Deex	2,208	+24	2,232	+21	2,253	+31	2,284	+211	2,495	+274	2,769	+323	3,092	Excluded	
Liberal	Dawid Jurczak	1,368	+4	1,372	+32	1,404	+13	1,417	+69	1,486	+211	1,697	Excluded			
Family First	Sanja Hendrick	887	+11	898	+33	931	+78	1,009	+152	1,161	Excluded					
Legalise Cannabis	Matthew Field	729	+23	752	+26	778	+26	804	Excluded							
Australian Family	Brae McKee	197	+39	236	+17	253	Excluded									
Fair Go	Angela Rojas	174	+13	187	Excluded											
United Voice	Marco Lorenzi	147	Excluded													

=== Enfield ===
2026 South Australian state election: Enfield
Party	Candidate	Votes	%	±%
Labor	Lawrence Ben	10,792	45.9	−6.5
One Nation	Paul Morrell	4,344	18.5	+14.0
Liberal	Oscar Ong	3,503	14.9	−14.3
Greens	Chris Siclari	2,727	11.6	+1.6
Independent Socialist	Leila Clendon	1,172	5.0	+5.0
Family First	Daniel Solomon	575	2.4	−1.6
United Voice	Andrew Riglin	287	1.2	+1.2
Australian Family	Ariah Merrett	137	0.6	+0.6
Total formal votes		23,537	95.5	−1.2
Informal votes		1,105	4.5	+1.2
Turnout		24,642	87.7	−0.4
Two-party-preferred result
Labor	Lawrence Ben	16,184	68.8	+4.2
One Nation	Paul Morrell	7,353	31.2	+31.2
Labor hold				

Distribution of preferences: Enfield
Party	Candidate	Votes	Round 1		Round 2		Round 3		Round 4		Round 5		Round 6	
Party	Candidate	Votes	Dist.	Total	Dist.	Total	Dist.	Total	Dist.	Total	Dist.	Total	Dist.	Total
Quota (50% + 1)		11,769												
Labor	Lawrence Ben	10,792	+16	10,808	+59	10,867	+110	10,977	+234	11,211	+2,920	14,131	+2,053	16,184
One Nation	Paul Morrell	4,344	+8	4,352	+156	4,508	+242	4,750	+38	4,788	+253	5,041	+2,312	7,353
Liberal	Oscar Ong	3,503	+11	3,514	+18	3,532	+143	3,675	+194	3,869	+496	4,365	Excluded	
Greens	Chris Siclari	2,727	+22	2,749	+6	2,755	+96	2,851	+818	3,669	Excluded			
Independent Socialist	Leila Clendon	1,172	+14	1,186	+41	1,227	+57	1,284	Excluded					
Family First	Daniel Solomon	575	+60	635	+13	648	Excluded							
United Voice	Andrew Riglin	287	+6	293	Excluded									
Australian Family	Ariah Merrett	137	Excluded											

=== Finniss ===
2026 South Australian state election: Finniss
Party	Candidate	Votes	%	±%
Liberal	David Basham	6,940	27.2	−16.0
One Nation	Greg Powell	5,842	22.9	+18.1
Labor	Phoebe Redington	4,725	18.5	−4.4
Independent	Lou Nicholson	4,617	18.1	−1.5
Greens	Bartholomew Astill-Pearce	1,603	6.3	−0.5
Independent	Bron Lewis	1,045	4.1	+4.1
Animal Justice	Tanya Hussey	417	1.6	+1.6
Australian Family	David Abram	264	1.0	+1.0
Fair Go	Michael Scott	98	0.4	+0.4
Total formal votes		25,551	95.5	−1.4
Informal votes		1,210	4.5	+1.4
Turnout		26,761	90.6	−1.5
Two-party-preferred result
Liberal	David Basham	14,579	57.1	+0.3
Labor	Phoebe Redington	10,972	42.9	−0.3
Two-candidate-preferred result
Independent	Lou Nicholson	14,102	55.2	+5.9
Liberal	David Basham	11,449	44.8	−5.9
Independent gain from Liberal		Swing	+5.9	

Distribution of preferences: Finniss
Party	Candidate	Votes	Round 1		Round 2		Round 3		Round 4		Round 5		Round 6		Round 7	
Party	Candidate	Votes	Dist.	Total	Dist.	Total	Dist.	Total	Dist.	Total	Dist.	Total	Dist.	Total	Dist.	Total
Quota (50% + 1)		12,776														
Liberal	David Basham	6,940	+25	6,965	+67	7,032	+39	7,071	+174	7,245	+93	7,338	+1,001	8,339	+3,110	11,449
One Nation	Greg Powell	5,842	+24	5,866	+80	5,946	+65	6,011	+93	6,104	+96	6,200	+680	6,880	Excluded	
Labor	Phoebe Redington	4,725	+7	4,732	+18	4,750	+61	4,811	+142	4,953	+576	5,529	Excluded			
Independent	Lou Nicholson	4,617	+10	4,627	+34	4,661	+63	4,724	+611	5,335	+1,149	6,484	+3,848	10,332	+3,770	14,102
Greens	Bartholomew Astill-Pearce	1,603	+8	1,611	+30	1,641	+170	1,811	+103	1,914	Excluded					
Independent	Bron Lewis	1,045	+5	1,050	+33	1,083	+40	1,123	Excluded							
Animal Justice	Tanya Hussey	417	+4	421	+17	438	Excluded									
Australian Family	David Abram	264	+15	279	Excluded											
Fair Go	Michael Scott	98	Excluded													

=== Flinders ===
2026 South Australian state election: Flinders
Party	Candidate	Votes	%	±%
Liberal	Sam Telfer	7,232	33.8	−12.2
One Nation	Brenton Hincks	6,042	28.2	+28.2
Independent	Meghan Petherick	2,870	13.4	+13.4
Labor	Ben Anchor	1,959	9.2	−4.7
Independent	Craig Haslam	1,190	5.6	+5.6
Greens	Kathryn Hardwick-Franco	760	3.6	−1.1
National	Dylan Cowley	460	2.1	−2.0
Independent	Rod Keogh	308	1.4	+1.4
SA Best	Thomas McNab	257	1.2	+1.2
Australian Family	Sam Fulwood	175	0.8	+0.8
Real Change	Spiro Manolakis	145	0.7	+0.7
Total formal votes		21,398	93.8	−3.1
Informal votes		1,425	6.2	+3.1
Turnout		22,823	86.5	−0.7
Two-party-preferred result
Liberal	Sam Telfer	15,868	74.1	+3.8
Labor	Ben Anchor	5,548	25.9	−3.8
Two-candidate-preferred result
Liberal	Sam Telfer	12,762	59.6	+6.7
One Nation	Brenton Hincks	8,636	40.4	+40.4
Liberal hold				

Distribution of preferences: Flinders
Party	Candidate	Votes	Round 1		Round 2		Round 3		Round 4		Round 5		Round 6		Round 7		Round 8		Round 9	
Party	Candidate	Votes	Dist.	Total	Dist.	Total	Dist.	Total	Dist.	Total	Dist.	Total	Dist.	Total	Dist.	Total	Dist.	Total	Dist.	Total
Quota (50% + 1)		10,700																		
Liberal	Sam Telfer	7,232	+27	7,259	+43	7,302	+52	7,354	+62	7,416	+125	7,541	+90	7,631	+373	8,004	+570	8,574	+4,188	12,762
One Nation	Brenton Hincks	6,042	+15	6,057	+46	6,103	+75	6,178	+33	6,211	+78	6,289	+50	6,339	+223	6,562	+511	7,073	+1,563	8,636
Independent	Meghan Petherick	2,870	+23	2,893	+18	2,911	+39	2,950	+79	3,029	+91	3,120	+203	3,323	+734	4,057	+1,694	5,751	Excluded	
Labor	Ben Anchor	1,959	+20	1,979	+20	1,999	+35	2,034	+13	2,047	+50	2,097	+298	2,395	+380	2,775	Excluded			
Independent	Craig Haslam	1,190	+11	1,201	+9	1,210	+41	1,251	+106	1,357	+111	1,468	+242	1,710	Excluded					
Greens	Kathryn Hardwick-Franco	760	+3	763	+10	773	+10	783	+34	817	+66	883	Excluded							
National	Dylan Cowley	460	+4	464	+8	472	+33	505	+16	521	Excluded									
Independent	Rod Keogh	308	+9	317	+10	327	+16	343	Excluded											
SA Best	Thomas McNab	257	+27	284	+17	301	Excluded													
Australian Family	Sam Fulwood	175	+6	181	Excluded															
Real Change	Spiro Manolakis	145	Excluded																	

=== Florey ===
2026 South Australian state election: Florey
Party	Candidate	Votes	%	±%
Labor	Michael Brown	10,376	47.3	−1.6
One Nation	Riley Size	5,038	23.0	+23.0
Greens	Alexandra McGee	2,344	10.7	+0.4
Liberal	Denise George	2,054	9.4	−19.0
Independent	Frances Bedford	1,059	4.8	+4.8
Family First	Mark Hawke	707	3.2	−3.2
Australian Family	Dieter Fischer	206	0.9	+0.9
Fair Go	Robert Jameson	87	0.4	+0.4
United Voice	Trent Wilton	65	0.3	+0.3
Total formal votes		21,936	94.4	−1.5
Informal votes		1,292	5.6	+1.5
Turnout		23,228	88.2	+0.4
Two-party-preferred result
Labor	Michael Brown	14,505	66.1	+3.3
One Nation	Riley Size	7,431	33.9	+33.9
Labor hold				

Distribution of preferences: Florey
Party	Candidate	Votes	Round 1		Round 2		Round 3		Round 4		Round 5		Round 6		Round 7	
Party	Candidate	Votes	Dist.	Total	Dist.	Total	Dist.	Total	Dist.	Total	Dist.	Total	Dist.	Total	Dist.	Total
Quota (50% + 1)		10,969														
Labor	Michael Brown	10,376	+6	10,382	+12	10,394	+32	10,426	+141	10,567	+427	10,994	+732	11,726	+2,779	14,505
One Nation	Riley Size	5,038	+14	5,052	+27	5,079	+45	5,124	+305	5,429	+309	5,738	+1,216	6,954	+477	7,431
Greens	Alexandra McGee	2,344	+9	2,353	+4	2,357	+26	2,383	+98	2,481	+295	2,776	+480	3,256	Excluded	
Liberal	Denise George	2,054	+4	2,058	+14	2,072	+28	2,100	+112	2,212	+216	2,428	Excluded			
Independent	Frances Bedford	1,059	+14	1,073	+7	1,080	+18	1,098	+149	1,247	Excluded					
Family First	Mark Hawke	707	+3	710	+11	721	+84	805	Excluded							
Australian Family	Dieter Fischer	206	+7	213	+20	233	Excluded									
Fair Go	Robert Jameson	87	+8	95	Excluded											
United Voice	Trent Wilton	65	Excluded													

=== Gibson ===
2026 South Australian state election: Gibson
Party	Candidate	Votes	%	±%
Labor	Sarah Andrews	11,335	46.0	+6.4
Liberal	Jane Fleming	5,758	23.4	−19.2
One Nation	Zoran Ananijev	3,625	14.7	+14.7
Greens	Mike Trewartha	3,092	12.5	+1.4
Animal Justice	Bin Liu	356	1.4	+1.4
Family First	Darryl Easther	303	1.2	−2.5
Australian Family	Glenn O'Rourke	116	0.5	+0.5
Fair Go	John Lutman	74	0.3	+0.3
Total formal votes		24,659	97.0	−0.6
Informal votes		771	3.0	+0.6
Turnout		25,430	88.8	−0.2
Two-party-preferred result
Labor	Sarah Andrews	15,706	63.7	+11.2
Liberal	Jane Fleming	8,953	36.3	−11.2
Labor hold		Swing	+11.2	

Distribution of preferences: Gibson
Party	Candidate	Votes	Round 1		Round 2		Round 3		Round 4		Round 5		Round 6	
Party	Candidate	Votes	Dist.	Total	Dist.	Total	Dist.	Total	Dist.	Total	Dist.	Total	Dist.	Total
Quota (50% + 1)		12,330												
Labor	Sarah Andrews	11,335	+14	11,349	+18	11,367	+46	11,413	+82	11,495	+2,721	14,216	+1,490	15,706
Liberal	Jane Fleming	5,758	+19	5,777	+5	5,782	+124	5,906	+48	5,954	+336	6,290	+2,663	8,953
One Nation	Zoran Ananijev	3,625	+11	3,636	+16	3,652	+110	3,762	+59	3,821	+332	4,153	Excluded	
Greens	Mike Trewartha	3,092	+10	3,102	+20	3,122	+41	3,163	+226	3,389	Excluded			
Animal Justice	Bin Liu	356	+6	362	+15	377	+38	415	Excluded					
Family First	Darryl Easther	303	+8	311	+59	359	Excluded							
Australian Family	Glenn O'Rourke	116	+6	122	Excluded									
Fair Go	John Lutman	74	Excluded											

=== Giles ===
2026 South Australian state election: Giles
Party	Candidate	Votes	%	±%
Labor	Eddie Hughes	10,450	48.7	−9.3
One Nation	Barry Drage	7,122	33.2	+26.8
Liberal	Sunny Singh	2,005	9.3	−8.5
Greens	Alex Taylor	1,150	5.4	+1.5
Family First	Gary Balfort	491	2.3	−0.5
Australian Family	Jasper Price	242	1.1	+1.1
Total formal votes		21,460	96.7	−0.9
Informal votes		731	3.3	+0.9
Turnout		22,191	81.5	−7.5
Two-party-preferred result
Labor	Eddie Hughes	12,547	58.5	−12.5
One Nation	Barry Drage	8,913	41.5	+41.5
Labor hold				

Distribution of preferences: Giles
Party	Candidate	Votes	Round 1		Round 2		Round 3		Round 4	
Party	Candidate	Votes	Dist.	Total	Dist.	Total	Dist.	Total	Dist.	Total
Quota (50% + 1)		10,731								
Labor	Eddie Hughes	10,450	+65	10,515	+149	10,664	+901	11,565	+982	12,547
One Nation	Barry Drage	7,122	+20	7,142	+288	7,430	+201	7,631	+1,282	8,913
Liberal	Sunny Singh	2,005	+18	2,023	+67	2,090	+174	2,264	Excluded	
Greens	Alex Taylor	1,150	+25	1,175	+101	1,276	Excluded			
Family First	Gary Balfort	491	+114	605	Excluded					
Australian Family	Jasper Price	242	Excluded							

=== Hammond ===
2026 South Australian state election: Hammond
Party	Candidate	Votes	%	±%
One Nation	Robert Roylance	6,440	27.4	+20.5
Labor	Simone Bailey	6,355	27.0	+3.8
Liberal	Adrian Pederick	5,244	22.3	−18.2
Independent	Airlie Keen	2,294	9.7	−6.0
Greens	Nicole Palachicky	1,166	5.0	−1.2
Legalise Cannabis	James Murphy	780	3.3	+3.3
Family First	Robert North	422	1.8	−2.5
Animal Justice	Ruby Eckermann	356	1.5	+1.5
Independent	Lucas Hope	229	1.0	+1.0
Australian Family	Bruce Hicks	114	0.5	+0.5
United Voice	Carmelo Graziano	88	0.4	+0.4
Fair Go	Tristan Iveson	34	0.1	+0.1
Total formal votes		23,523	92.3	−3.5
Informal votes		1,961	7.7	+3.5
Turnout		25,484	87.4	−0.4
Two-party-preferred result
One Nation	Robert Roylance	12,913	54.9	+54.9
Labor	Simone Bailey	10,609	45.1	+0.2
One Nation gain from Liberal				

=== Hartley ===
2026 South Australian state election: Hartley
Party	Candidate	Votes	%	±%
Labor	Jenn Roberts	8,374	36.8	−0.6
Liberal	Vincent Tarzia	6,747	29.6	−21.4
One Nation	David Dwyer	3,644	16.0	+16.0
Greens	Melanie Searle	2,882	12.7	+1.1
Family First	Hugh Thompson	468	2.1	+2.1
Real Change	Mara Dottore	344	1.5	+1.5
United Voice	Peter Salerno	126	0.6	+0.6
Australian Family	Bruce Smith	101	0.4	+0.4
Fair Go	Robert Mill	76	0.3	+0.3
Total formal votes		22,762	94.9	−2.0
Informal votes		1,234	5.1	+2.0
Turnout		23,996	89.6	±0.0
Two-party-preferred result
Labor	Jenn Roberts	12,455	54.7	+8.3
Liberal	Vincent Tarzia	10,313	45.3	−8.3
Labor gain from Liberal		Swing	+8.3	

=== Heysen ===
2026 South Australian state election: Heysen
Party	Candidate	Votes	%	±%
Liberal	Josh Teague	8,697	32.6	−9.4
Labor	Marisa Bell	6,472	24.2	−1.3
Greens	Genevieve Dawson-Scott	5,838	21.9	+2.3
One Nation	Tom Kovac	4,313	16.2	+11.5
Animal Justice	Gregory Davis	477	1.8	+1.8
Independent	Andrew Granger	454	1.7	+1.7
Family First	Chris Baker	285	1.1	−2.8
Australian Family	Craig Wilson	90	0.3	+0.3
Fair Go	Tonya Scott	78	0.3	+0.3
Total formal votes		26,704	96.1	−1.9
Informal votes		1,095	3.9	+1.9
Turnout		27,799	92.5	−1.0
Two-party-preferred result
Liberal	Josh Teague	13,531	50.6	−1.3
Labor	Marisa Bell	13,184	49.4	+1.3
Liberal hold		Swing	−1.3	

=== Hurtle Vale ===
2026 South Australian state election: Hurtle Vale
Party	Candidate	Votes	%	±%
Labor	Nat Cook	11,245	45.0	−8.8
One Nation	Katrina Emmerson	6,700	26.8	+26.8
Liberal	Charlotte Grundy	2,531	10.1	−16.5
Greens	Tammy Scott	2,407	9.6	+1.4
Family First	Sarah Kopeikin	851	3.4	−1.1
Legalise Cannabis	Jane Savage	683	2.7	+2.7
Animal Justice	Jannah Fahiz	355	1.4	+1.4
Australian Family	Michael Mitchard	199	0.8	−2.0
Total formal votes		24,971	96.4	+0.7
Informal votes		943	3.6	−0.7
Turnout		25,914	88.1	−1.0
Two-party-preferred result
Labor	Nat Cook	15,181	60.8	−4.7
One Nation	Katrina Emmerson	9,790	39.2	+39.2
Labor hold				

Distribution of preferences: Hurtle Vale
Party	Candidate	Votes	Round 1		Round 2		Round 3		Round 4		Round 5		Round 6	
Party	Candidate	Votes	Dist.	Total	Dist.	Total	Dist.	Total	Dist.	Total	Dist.	Total	Dist.	Total
Quota (50% + 1)		12,486												
Labor	Nat Cook	11,245	+25	11,270	+59	11,329	+155	11,484	+178	11,662	+692	12,354	+2,827	15,181
One Nation	Katrina Emmerson	6,700	+16	6,716	+43	6,759	+149	6,908	+379	7,287	+1,679	8,966	+824	9,790
Liberal	Charlotte Grundy	2,531	+33	2,564	+32	2,596	+39	2,635	+175	2,810	Excluded			
Greens	Tammy Scott	2,407	+17	2,424	+128	2,552	+288	2,840	+372	3,212	+439	3,651	Excluded	
Family First	Sarah Kopeikin	851	+81	932	+51	983	+121	1,104	Excluded					
Legalise Cannabis	Jane Savage	683	+6	689	+63	752	Excluded							
Animal Justice	Jannah Fahiz	355	+21	376	Excluded									
Australian Family	Michael Mitchard	199	Excluded											

=== Kaurna ===
2026 South Australian state election: Kaurna
Party	Candidate	Votes	%	±%
Labor	Chris Picton	10,936	45.0	−11.0
One Nation	Zoe Jones	6,552	26.9	+18.7
Greens	Sean Weatherly	2,874	11.8	+1.0
Liberal	Shane Carter	1,969	8.1	−12.6
Family First	Amanda Brohier	684	2.8	−1.5
Legalise Cannabis	Gary Haddrell	595	2.4	+2.4
Real Change	Anastasios Manolakis	572	2.4	+2.4
Australian Family	Patrick Amadio	138	0.6	+0.6
Total formal votes		24,320	95.8	−0.8
Informal votes		1,078	4.2	+0.8
Turnout		25,398	88.0	+0.2
Two-party-preferred result
Labor	Chris Picton	15,071	62.0	−8.1
One Nation	Zoe Jones	9,249	38.0	+38.0
Labor hold				

=== Kavel ===
2026 South Australian state election: Kavel
Party	Candidate	Votes	%	±%
Labor	David Leach	5,901	23.5	+8.9
Independent	Matt Schultz	5,227	20.9	+20.9
Liberal	Bradley Orr	4,990	19.9	−0.2
One Nation	Christiaan Loch	4,890	19.5	+15.8
Greens	Sam Tyler	2,767	11.0	+2.9
Animal Justice	Padma Chaplin	392	1.6	−1.0
Family First	Dayle Baker	351	1.4	+1.4
Real Change	Ashley Moule	256	1.0	+1.0
Independent	Jacob van Raalte	127	0.5	+0.5
Australian Family	Baden Ashman	115	0.5	+0.5
Fair Go	David Stone	48	0.2	+0.2
Total formal votes		25,064	94.8	−2.7
Informal votes		1,384	5.2	+2.7
Turnout		26,448	91.3	+0.0
Two-candidate-preferred result
Independent	Matt Schultz	15,182	60.6	+60.6
Labor	David Leach	9,882	39.4	+39.4
Independent gain from Independent				

=== King ===
2026 South Australian state election: King
Party	Candidate	Votes	%	±%
Labor	Rhiannon Pearce	11,106	43.0	−0.2
One Nation	David Kerrison	7,924	30.7	+30.7
Liberal	Amanda Hendry	3,101	12.0	−28.2
Greens	Samuel Moore	2,405	9.3	+3.7
Family First	Julie Glasgow	636	2.5	−1.1
Real Change	Adriana Haynes	191	0.7	−0.6
Australian Family	Angela Zakarias	165	0.6	−3.0
United Voice	Lukas Gleeson	153	0.6	+0.6
Fair Go	Tyla Finlay	120	0.5	+0.5
Total formal votes		25,801	96.3	±0.0
Informal votes		985	3.7	±0.0
Turnout		26,786	90.1	−1.6
Two-party-preferred result
Labor	Rhiannon Pearce	14,125	55.2	+2.3
One Nation	David Kerrison	11,459	44.8	+44.8
Labor hold				

=== Lee ===
2026 South Australian state election: Lee
Party	Candidate	Votes	%	±%
Labor	David Wilkins	10,072	43.7	−7.6
One Nation	Fabio Sturm	5,844	25.4	+25.4
Liberal	Merlindie Fardone	3,685	16.0	−18.1
Greens	Brett Ferris	2,302	10.0	+1.6
Family First	Krystal Schulz	482	2.1	−4.2
Real Change	Vasko Vukoje	269	1.2	+1.2
Fair Go	Sarah McGrath	214	0.9	+0.9
Australian Family	Bill Day	154	0.7	+0.7
Total formal votes		23,022	95.3	−1.7
Informal votes		1,124	4.7	+1.7
Turnout		24,146	89.1	+0.6
Two-party-preferred result
Labor	David Wilkins	13,666	59.4	−1.8
One Nation	Fabio Sturm	9,356	40.6	+40.6
Labor hold				

=== Light ===
2026 South Australian state election: Light
Party	Candidate	Votes	%	±%
Labor	James Agness	8,889	36.9	−20.6
One Nation	Alexander Banks	8,327	34.5	+27.7
Liberal	Andrew Williamson	2,961	12.3	−11.6
Greens	James Scalzi	2,174	9.0	2.4
Family First	Jacinta Roberts	837	3.5	−1.7
Legalise Cannabis	Liam Morgan	663	2.7	+2.7
Australian Family	Dan Hale	260	1.1	+1.1
Total formal votes		24,111	96.0	−1.0
Informal votes		1,004	4.0	+1.0
Turnout		25,115	85.7	−2.4
Two-party-preferred result
Labor	James Agness	12,445	51.6	−17.9
One Nation	Alex Banks	11,658	48.4	+48.4
Labor hold				

=== MacKillop ===
2026 South Australian state election: MacKillop
Party	Candidate	Votes	%	±%
One Nation	Jason Virgo	8,407	35.3	+27.2
Liberal	Rebekah Rosser	5,623	23.6	−38.7
Labor	Mark Braes	3,715	15.6	−4.5
Independent	Nick McBride	3,398	14.2	+14.2
Greens	Cathy Olsson	862	3.6	+3.6
National	Jonathan Pietzsch	780	3.3	−1.5
Legalise Cannabis	Tim Green	528	2.2	+2.2
Australian Family	Joanna Day	350	1.5	+1.5
Independent	Steven Davies	180	0.7	+0.7
Total formal votes		23,843	95.0	−1.5
Informal votes		1,267	5.0	+1.5
Turnout		25,110	90.0	−0.6
Two-candidate-preferred result
One Nation	Jason Virgo	12,123	50.8	+50.8
Liberal	Rebekah Rosser	11,720	49.2	−23.4
One Nation gain from Liberal				

=== Mawson ===
2026 South Australian state election: Mawson
Party	Candidate	Votes	%	±%
Labor	Jenni Mitton	9,394	37.4	−13.8
One Nation	Tyler Green	6,554	26.1	+19.5
Liberal	Mike Holden	4,331	17.2	−10.8
Greens	Lawrence Johnson	3,220	12.8	+4.0
Legalise Cannabis	Lesley Gray	1,051	4.2	+4.2
Australian Family	Peter Ieraci	294	1.2	+0.0
Real Change	Kelly Schumacher	274	1.1	+1.1
Total formal votes		25,118	96.5	−0.5
Informal votes		905	3.5	+0.5
Turnout		26,023	88.9	−1.1
Two-party-preferred result
Labor	Jenni Mitton	14,224	56.6	−7.2
One Nation	Tyler Green	10,894	43.4	+43.4
Labor hold				

=== Morialta ===
2026 South Australian state election: Morialta
Party	Candidate	Votes	%	±%
Labor	Matthew Marozzi	9,610	40.6	+4.5
Liberal	Scott Kennedy	5,974	25.2	−21.0
One Nation	Peter Ellery	4,343	18.3	+18.3
Greens	Jenn Tranter	2,695	11.4	+1.1
Family First	Rosie Cirocco	574	2.4	−5.0
Real Change	Janice Hutchison	314	1.3	+1.3
Australian Family	James Bodycote	98	0.4	+0.4
Fair Go	Casey Marley-Duncan	75	0.3	+0.3
Total formal votes		23,683	96.3	−0.6
Informal votes		904	3.7	+0.6
Turnout		24,587	90.3	−1.3
Two-party-preferred result
Labor	Matthew Marozzi	13,846	58.5	+9.9
Liberal	Scott Kennedy	9,836	41.5	−9.9
Labor gain from Liberal		Swing	+9.9	

=== Morphett ===
2026 South Australian state election: Morphett
Party	Candidate	Votes	%	±%
Labor	Toby Priest	8,052	35.9	+0.3
Liberal	Stephen Patterson	7,857	35.1	−16.6
One Nation	Tim March	3,413	15.2	+15.2
Greens	Isabella Litt	2,303	10.3	−2.4
Animal Justice	Ren Ryba	288	1.3	+1.3
Australian Family	Craig Attard	274	1.2	+1.2
Real Change	Tim Birdseye	155	0.7	+0.7
Fair Go	Maria Ruta	72	0.3	+0.3
Total formal votes		22,414	96.3	−1.2
Informal votes		837	3.7	+1.2
Turnout		23,281	89.3	+0.5
Two-party-preferred result
Labor	Toby Priest	11,360	50.7	+5.2
Liberal	Stephen Patterson	11,054	49.3	−5.2
Labor gain from Liberal		Swing	+5.2	

=== Mount Gambier ===
2026 South Australian state election: Mount Gambier
Party	Candidate	Votes	%	±%
Independent	Travis Fatchen	5,979	27.1	+27.1
One Nation	Annie-Marie Loef	5,939	26.9	+26.9
Labor	Matthew Key	3,319	15.0	−5.6
Liberal	Lamorna Alexander	2,768	12.5	−16.5
Independent	Cody Scholes	1,401	6.3	+6.3
Greens	Sharon Holmes	1,050	4.8	+4.8
Independent	Kate Amoroso	930	4.2	+4.2
Legalise Cannabis	Martin Godfrey	271	1.2	+1.2
Family First	Rachael Kenyon	221	1.0	−3.7
Animal Justice	James Thomson	141	0.6	+0.6
Australian Family	Eleanor Day	85	0.4	+0.4
Total formal votes		22,104	93.0	−4.0
Informal votes		1,671	7.0	+4.0
Turnout		23,775	88.9	−0.4
Two-candidate-preferred result
Independent	Travis Fatchen	13,349	60.4	+60.4
One Nation	Annie-Marie Loef	8,755	39.6	+39.6
Independent gain from Independent				

=== Narungga ===
2026 South Australian state election: Narungga
Party	Candidate	Votes	%	±%
One Nation	Chantelle Thomas	9,037	37.5	+32.0
Liberal	Tania Stock	5,409	22.5	−7.6
Independent	Fraser Ellis	4,101	17.0	−13.5
Labor	Esther Short	3,745	15.6	−4.6
Greens	Jessica Scriven	692	2.9	+2.9
Legalise Cannabis	Nicole Lornie	451	1.9	+1.9
Family First	John Bennett	334	1.4	−1.9
Australian Family	Maria Vottari	132	0.5	+0.6
Real Change	Joanne Taylerson	122	0.5	+0.5
United Voice	Peter Illingworth	56	0.2	+0.2
Total formal votes		24,079	94.3	
Informal votes		1,444	5.7	
Turnout		25,523	90.3	
Two-candidate-preferred result
One Nation	Chantelle Thomas	12,073	50.1	+50.1
Liberal	Tania Stock	12,015	49.9	+8.0
One Nation gain from Independent		Swing	+50.1	

=== Newland ===
2026 South Australian state election: Newland
Party	Candidate	Votes	%	±%
Labor	Olivia Savvas	11,348	46.2	+9.3
One Nation	Alison Dew-Fennell	6,088	24.8	+21.0
Liberal	Sarai Birch	3,789	15.4	−19.2
Greens	Helen Wright	2,118	8.6	+2.8
Family First	Rachel Mathew	658	2.7	−0.9
Australian Family	Colin Stanford	211	0.9	−0.1
United Voice	Abe Lazootin	206	0.8	+0.8
Fair Go	Hayley Marley-Duncan	136	0.6	+0.6
Total formal votes		24,554	96.9	+1.3
Informal votes		785	3.1	−1.3
Turnout		25,339	93.8	+2.9
Two-party-preferred result
Labor	Olivia Savvas	14,221	60.3	+4.9
One Nation	Alison Dew-Fennell	9,382	39.7	+39.7
Labor hold				

=== Ngadjuri ===
2026 South Australian state election: Ngadjuri
Party	Candidate	Votes	%	±%
One Nation	David Paton	8,499	34.9	+23.9
Labor	Tony Piccolo	7,186	29.5	+3.9
Liberal	Penny Pratt	6,161	25.3	−19.7
Greens	Danielle Every	1,125	4.6	+4.6
Legalise Cannabis	Mark Lobban	455	1.9	+1.9
Animal Justice	Cherie Steele	396	1.6	+1.6
Family First	Sharon Pearce	358	1.5	+1.5
Australian Family	Jonathan Jenkins	109	0.4	+0.4
Fair Go	Shari Olsson	90	0.4	+0.4
Total formal votes		24,379	95.9	−0.4
Informal votes		1,033	4.1	+0.4
Turnout		25,412	90.7	+0.1
Two-party-preferred result
One Nation	David Paton	13,944	57.1	+57.1
Labor	Tony Piccolo	10,496	42.9	+1.0
One Nation gain from Liberal				

Swing is compared to the 2022 results in the electoral district of Frome.

=== Playford ===
2026 South Australian state election: Playford
Party	Candidate	Votes	%	±%
Labor	John Fulbrook	11,209	50.8	−2.7
One Nation	Nickolas Tsentidis	5,343	24.2	+24.2
Greens	David Wright	1,988	9.0	−0.5
Liberal	Christopher Jones	1,760	8.0	−16.7
Family First	Antonio Rangel	765	3.5	−4.5
Legalise Cannabis	Trent Oehme	526	2.4	+2.4
Australian Family	Richard Bunting	247	1.1	+1.1
United Voice	Grace Bawden	206	0.9	+0.9
Total formal votes		22,044	94.7	−1.0
Informal votes		1,238	5.3	+1.0
Turnout		23,282	86.6	−0.8
Two-party-preferred result
Labor	John Fulbrook	14,809	67.2	+0.9
One Nation	Nickolas Tsentidis	7,239	32.8	+32.8
Labor hold				

=== Port Adelaide ===
2026 South Australian state election: Port Adelaide
Party	Candidate	Votes	%	±%
Labor	Cheyne Rich	9,312	39.3	−19.1
One Nation	Joel Hendrie	5,080	21.4	+21.4
Independent	Claire Boan	3,097	13.1	+13.1
Greens	Hayden Shaw	2,425	10.2	+0.0
Liberal	Scott Anderson	1,724	7.3	−15.3
Legalise Cannabis	Sallyann Keen	511	2.1	+2.1
Independent	Gary Johanson	446	1.9	+1.9
Independent	Anne McMenamin	341	1.4	+1.4
Family First	Lucia Snelling	332	1.4	−3.6
Fair Go	Galina Brunoli	253	1.1	+1.1
Australian Family	Tom Day	135	0.6	+0.6
United Voice	Aaron Machado	44	0.2	+0.2
Total formal votes		23,700	92.8	−3.8
Informal votes		1,848	7.2	+3.8
Turnout		25,548	88.8	+0.7
Two-party-preferred result
Labor	Cheyne Rich	15,272	64.4	−7.4
One Nation	Joel Hendrie	8,428	35.6	+35.6
Labor hold		Swing	−7.4	

=== Ramsay ===
2026 South Australian state election: Ramsay
Party	Candidate	Votes	%	±%
Labor	Zoe Bettison	10,896	49.0	−11.0
One Nation	Ralph Chambers	6,231	28.0	+28.0
Greens	Luke Skinner	1,791	8.1	+0.9
Liberal	Daryl McCann	1,386	6.2	−15.2
Legalise Cannabis	Mark Eckermann	769	3.5	+3.5
Family First	Luz Velasquez	683	3.1	−8.3
United Voice	Nic Owen	199	0.9	+0.9
Australian Family	Ashley Gaylor	178	0.8	+0.8
Fair Go	Leo Demitriou	107	0.5	+0.5
Total formal votes		22,240	93.6	−2.2
Informal votes		1,508	6.4	2.2
Turnout		23,748	83.5	−0.3
Two-party-preferred result
Labor	Zoe Bettison	13,996	62.9	−7.0
One Nation	Ralph Chambers	8,244	37.1	+37.1
Labor hold				

=== Reynell ===
2026 South Australian state election: Reynell
Party	Candidate	Votes	%	±%
Labor	Katrine Hildyard	10,280	44.1	−10.4
One Nation	Peter Heggie	6,457	27.7	+27.7
Greens	Miya Tait	2,535	10.9	−0.1
Liberal	Haseen Zaman	1,903	8.2	−16.5
Legalise Cannabis	Adnan Krasniqi	1,118	4.8	+4.8
Family First	Andy Farmer	783	3.4	−6.4
Australian Family	Aaron O'Rourke	222	1.0	+1.0
Total formal votes		23,298	95.4	−0.8
Informal votes		1,132	4.6	+0.8
Turnout		24,430	86.7	−0.7
Two-party-preferred result
Labor	Katrine Hildyard	14,013	60.1	−6.6
One Nation	Peter Heggie	9,284	39.9	+39.9
Labor hold				

=== Schubert ===
2026 South Australian state election: Schubert
Party	Candidate	Votes	%	±%
Liberal	Ashton Hurn	12,515	47.0	−4.4
One Nation	Bruce Preece	6,079	22.8	+16.0
Labor	James Rothe	5,352	20.1	−2.6
Greens	Beverley Morris	1,855	7.0	−3.2
Animal Justice	Alice Shore	420	1.6	+1.6
Australian Family	Matt Williams	297	1.1	+1.1
Fair Go	David Duncan	108	0.4	+0.4
Total formal votes		26,626	97.1	+0.9
Informal votes		790	2.9	−0.9
Turnout		27,416	93.4	+0.7
Two-party-preferred result
Liberal	Ashton Hurn	17,946	67.4	+5.5
Labor	James Rothe	8,681	32.6	−5.5
Liberal hold		Swing	+5.5	

=== Stuart ===
2026 South Australian state election: Stuart
Party	Candidate	Votes	%	±%
Independent	Geoff Brock	8,603	38.4	+1.7
One Nation	Brandon Turton	6,236	27.8	+21.3
Liberal	Leon Stephens	3,836	17.1	−14.9
Labor	David Ewings	1,988	8.9	−9.4
Greens	Poppy Pilmore	875	3.9	+1.2
Legalise Cannabis	Jessica McKinnon	473	2.1	+2.1
Australian Family	Stephen Tonkin	219	1.0	+1.0
Animal Justice	Robyn Parnell	180	0.8	+0.8
Total formal votes		22,410	96.8	−0.8
Informal votes		733	3.2	+0.8
Turnout		23,143	81.4	−5.6
Two-candidate-preferred result
Independent	Geoff Brock	12,757	56.9	−10.2
One Nation	Brandon Turton	9,653	43.1	+43.1
Independent hold		Swing	−10.2	

=== Taylor ===
2026 South Australian state election: Taylor
Party	Candidate	Votes	%	±%
Labor	Nick Champion	9,201	39.7	−13.7
One Nation	Peter Rentoulis	7,956	34.3	+25.5
Greens	Xander Osborne	1,890	8.1	+2.1
Liberal	Ted Boul Hosn	1,870	8.1	−13.0
Family First	Kylie Evans	1,288	5.6	−2.1
Legalise Cannabis	Brett Stephens	725	3.1	+3.1
Australian Family	John Attard	261	1.1	+1.1
Total formal votes		23,191	95.0	+0.2
Informal votes		1,221	5.0	−0.2
Turnout		24,412	82.6	−1.0
Two-party-preferred result
Labor	Nick Champion	12,577	54.2	−15.5
One Nation	Peter Rentoulis	10,611	45.8	+45.8
Labor hold				

=== Torrens ===
2026 South Australian state election: Torrens
Party	Candidate	Votes	%	±%
Labor	Meagan Spencer	10,294	43.4	−5.2
One Nation	David Medlock	4,920	20.7	+20.7
Liberal	Haritha Yara	3,781	15.9	−17.7
Greens	Stella Salvemini	3,430	14.5	+3.9
Family First	Mervin Joshua	786	3.3	−3.9
United Voice	Bradley Warren	292	1.2	+1.2
Australian Family	Malcolm Reynolds	236	1.0	+1.0
Total formal votes		23,739	96.2	−0.7
Informal votes		925	3.8	+0.7
Turnout		24,664	87.7	−0.7
Two-party-preferred result
Labor	Meagan Spencer	15,582	65.6	+5.6
One Nation	David Medlock	8,157	34.4	+34.4
Labor hold		Swing	+5.6	

=== Unley ===
2026 South Australian state election: Unley
Party	Candidate	Votes	%	±%
Labor	Alice Rolls	9,390	38.4	+6.3
Liberal	Rosalie Rotolo	7,746	31.7	−17.5
Greens	Dylan Kiernan	3,344	13.7	−5.0
One Nation	Jason Wilkinson	2,288	9.4	+9.4
Independent	Ryan Harrison	1,059	4.3	+4.3
Animal Justice	Josip Ivka	314	1.3	+1.3
Real Change	Emma Paterson	183	0.7	+0.7
Australian Family	Peter Attard	142	0.6	+0.6
Total formal votes		24,466	97.2	−1.0
Informal votes		695	2.8	+1.0
Turnout		25,161	91.5	+1.4
Two-party-preferred result
Labor	Alice Rolls	13,905	56.8	+9.0
Liberal	Rosalie Rotolo	10,555	43.2	−9.0
Labor gain from Liberal		Swing	+9.0	

=== Waite ===
2026 South Australian state election: Waite
Party	Candidate	Votes	%	±%
Labor	Catherine Hutchesson	12,742	49.3	+22.7
Liberal	Frank Pangallo	4,769	18.4	−7.4
Greens	Declan Brumfield	4,199	16.2	+4.8
One Nation	Aaron von Frattner	3,070	11.9	+11.9
Independent	Alec Gargett	751	2.9	+2.9
Australian Family	Ross Pawley	259	1.0	+1.0
Fair Go	Mark Ruta	61	0.2	+0.2
Total formal votes		25,851	97.6	±0.0
Informal votes		633	2.4	±0.0
Turnout		26,484	92.8	+0.2
Two-party-preferred result
Labor	Catherine Hutchesson	18,012	69.7	+15.7
Liberal	Frank Pangallo	7,839	30.3	−15.7
Labor hold		Swing	+15.7	

=== West Torrens ===
2026 South Australian state election: West Torrens
Party	Candidate	Votes	%	±%
Labor	Tom Koutsantonis	11,802	52.6	−2.3
One Nation	Judith Aldridge	4,045	18.0	+18.0
Greens	Sam Bannon	3,854	17.2	±0.0
Liberal	Sarika Sharma	2,174	9.7	−18.2
Family First	Anna Wamayi	390	1.7	+1.7
Australian Family	Mathew Wilson	179	0.8	+0.8
Total formal votes		22,444	97.4	+0.4
Informal votes		599	2.6	−0.4
Turnout		23,043	88.6	−0.6
Two-party-preferred result
Labor	Tom Koutsantonis	16,439	73.2	+4.4
One Nation	Judith Aldridge	6,005	26.8	+26.8
Labor hold				

=== Wright ===
2026 South Australian state election: Wright
Party	Candidate	Votes	%	±%
Labor	Blair Boyer	11,939	48.1	−3.7
One Nation	Sean Porter	7,062	28.5	+28.5
Liberal	Carston Woodhouse (disendorsed)	2,170	8.8	−23.2
Greens	Samantha Skinner	2,145	8.6	+0.3
Family First	Sue Nancarrow	672	2.7	−4.5
Animal Justice	Deb Horley	373	1.5	+1.5
Australian Family	Robin Hill	352	1.4	+1.4
United Voice	Rosalind Wilton	107	0.4	+0.4
Total formal votes		24,820	95.8	−1.4
Informal votes		1,079	4.2	+1.4
Turnout		25,899	90.6	−0.1
Two-party-preferred result
Labor	Blair Boyer	15,512	62.5	+0.6
One Nation	Sean Porter	9,308	37.5	+37.5
Labor hold		Swing	+0.6	

== Distribution of preferences ==
=== Final distribution ===
Party	ALP	LIB	ONP	Contests
Greens	84.5	15.5	—N/a	6
Greens	80.4	—N/a	19.6	12
Liberal	34.5	—N/a	65.5	10
One Nation	31.1	68.9	—N/a	7
Labor	—N/a	71.5	28.5	2

== See also ==
- 2026 South Australian Legislative Council election
- Candidates of the 2026 South Australian House of Assembly election
- Members of the South Australian House of Assembly, 2026–2030
