= 2026 South Australian Legislative Council election =

2026 South Australian state election (Legislative Council)
- 21 March 2026

11 of the 22 seats in the South Australian Legislative Council 12 seats needed for a majority
- Registered: 1,317,186
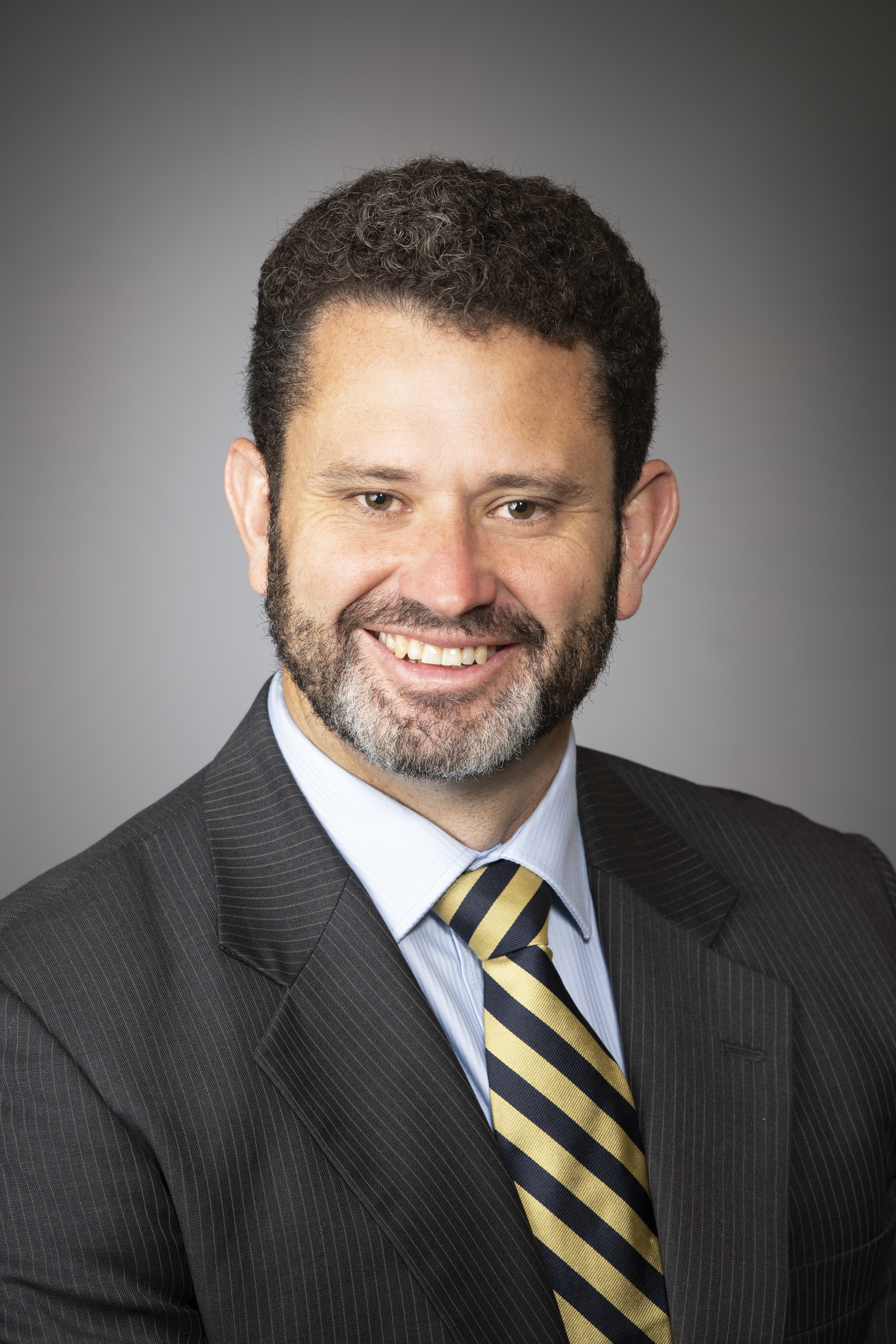

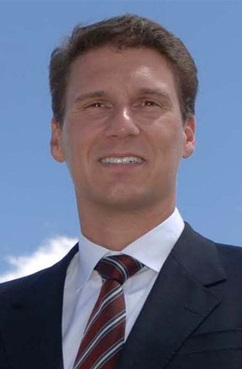

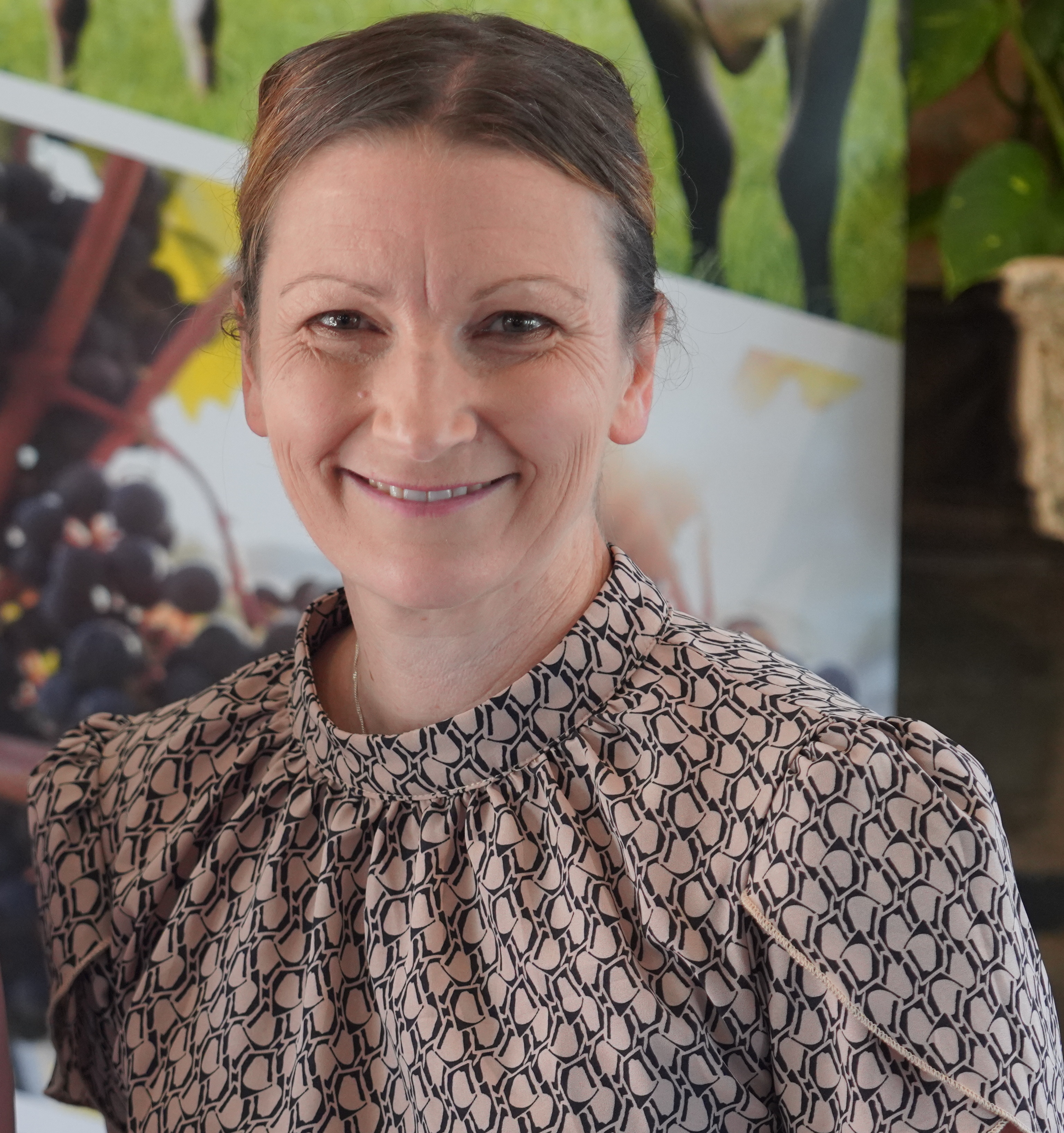

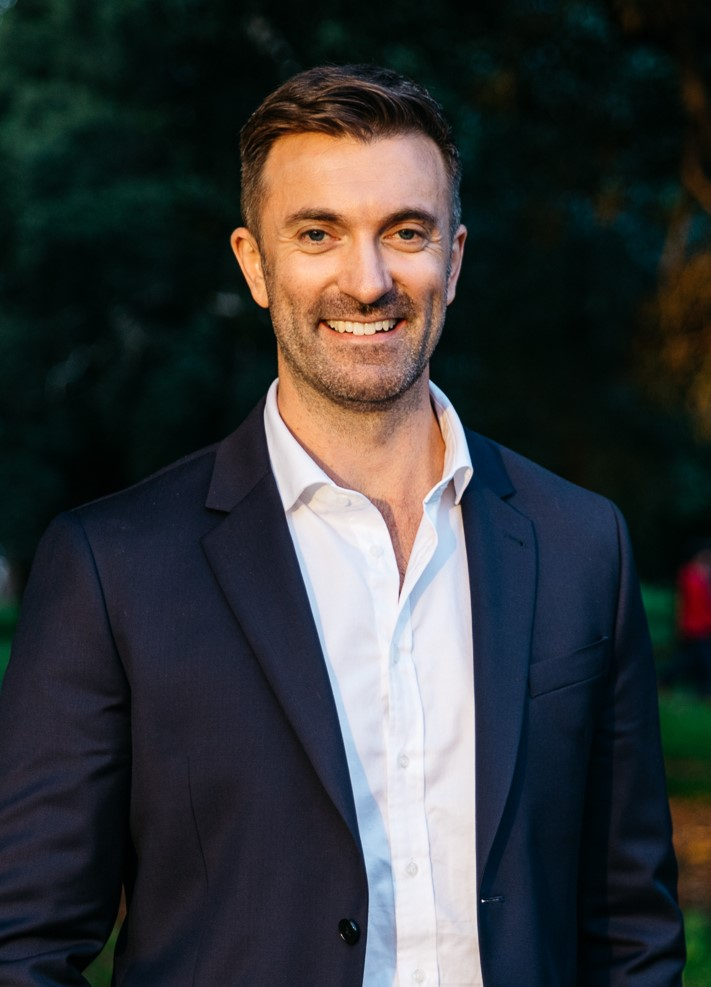

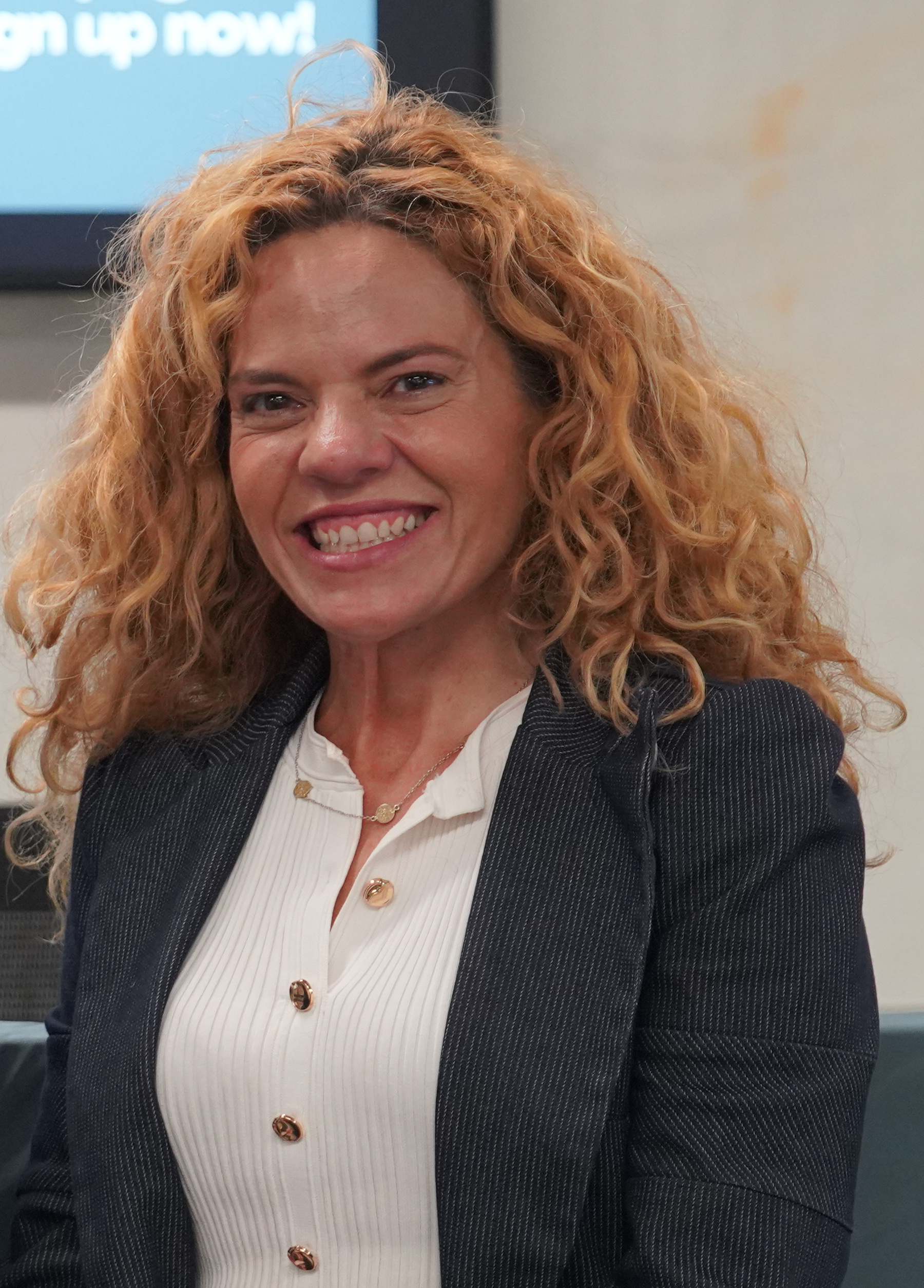

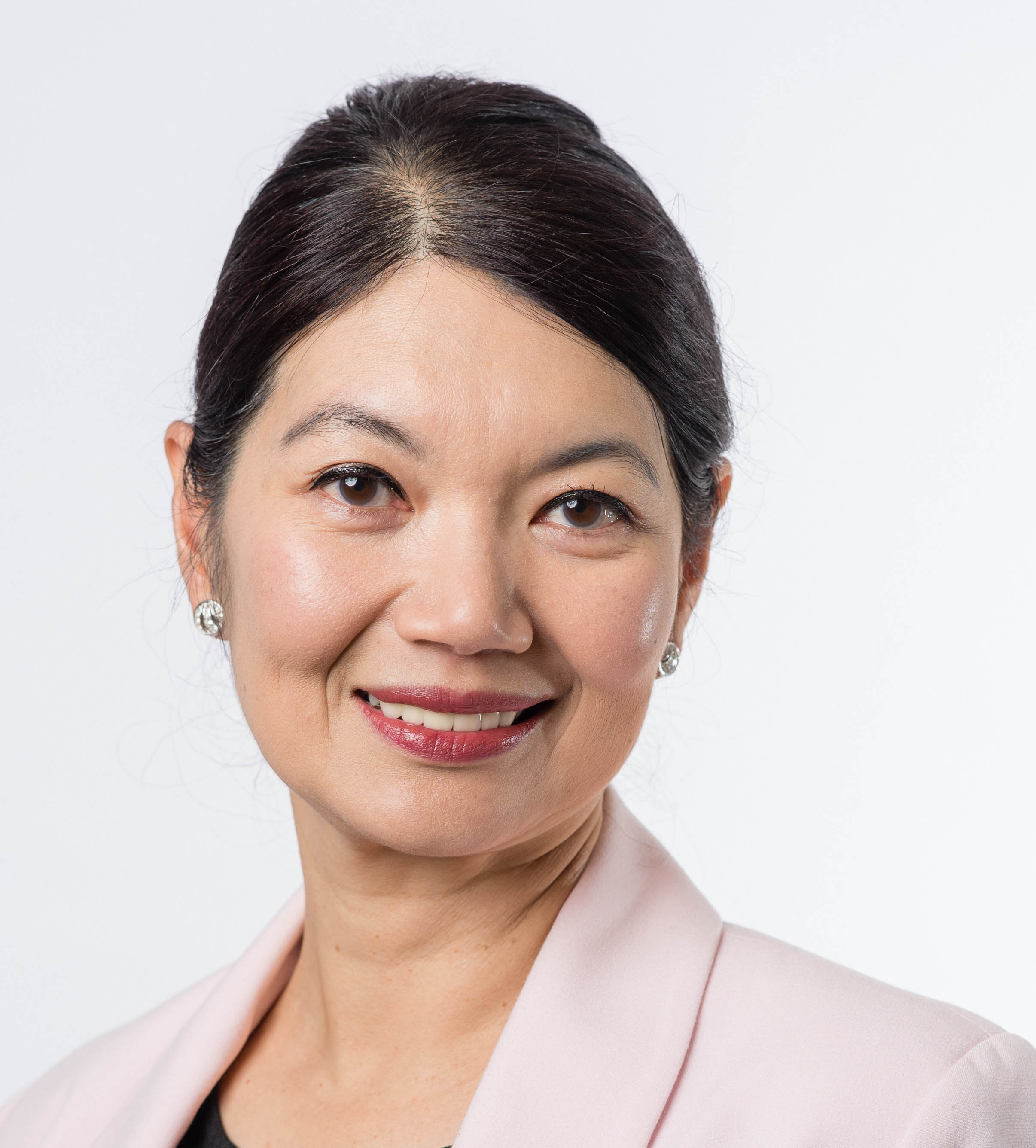
	First party	Second party	Third party
Leader	Kyam Maher (not up for election)	Cory Bernardi (won seat)	Nicola Centofanti (not up for election)
Party	Labor	One Nation	Liberal
Leader since	10 April 2018	3 February 2026	19 April 2022
Last election	9 seats	1 seat	8 seats
Seats before	9	0	8
Seats won	5	3	2
Seats after	10	3	6
Seat change	▲1	▲2	▼2
Popular vote	417,728	278,006	201,823
Percentage	36.7%	24.4%	17.7%
Swing	▼0.3 pp	▲20.2 pp	▼16.7 pp
	Fourth party	Fifth party	Sixth party
Leader	Robert Simms (not up for election)	Connie Bonaros (lost seat)	Jing Lee (lost seat)
Party	Greens	SA Best	Better Community
Leader since	13 May 2025	30 November 2023	22 May 2025
Last election	2 seats	2 seats	0 seats
Seats before	1	1	1
Seats won	1	0	0
Seats after	2	0	0
Seat change	Steady	▼2	▼1
Popular vote	116,048	7,438	6,862
Percentage	10.2%	0.7%	0.6%
Swing	▲1.2 pp	▼0.3 pp	▲0.6 pp
Leader of the Government before election
Kyam Maher
Labor
Elected Leader of the Government
Kyam Maher
Labor

The 2026 South Australian Legislative Council election was held on 21 March 2026 to elect 11 of the 22 members of the South Australian Legislative Council as part of the 2026 South Australian state election.

The election was notable for Pauline Hanson's One Nation party strongest performance in South Australia, winning three Legislative Council seats and four House of Assembly Seats, and the collapsed vote of the South Australian Liberal Party.

In the Legislative Council, One Nation won three seats, one more than the South Australian Liberal Party. Elected were 5 Labor, 3 One Nation , 2 Liberal and 1 SA Greens. Carrying over from the 2022 election were 5 Labor, 4 Liberal, 1 Green and 1 Sarah Game Fair Go, resulting in the total numbers in the Council - 10 Labor, 6 Liberal, 3 One Nation, 2 SA Greens and 1 Sarah Game Fair Go.

SA Best which won 2 seats at the 2018 election failed to win a single seat along with Jing Lee, a former Liberal, who had created a new party Better Community.

Tammy Franks a member of the Legislative Council since 2010 as an SA Green, in September 2024 said she would not contest the next election. In May 2025, she resigned from the South Australian Greens, citing tensions within the party, and reiterated that she still did not intend to contest the next election "at this point". However, in February 2026, she announced that she would run as an independent candidate for the Legislative Council in the election the following month. Franks was unsuccessful in her attempt to be elected as an Independent receiving 0.5% of the vote.

Sarah Game who was the first elected One Nation candidate in South Australia at the 2022 election was not up for re-election as her 8-year term ends in 2030. Game had resigned from One Nation in May 2025 to become an Independent. In July 2025 she founded a new party which, registered as Sarah Game Fair Go for Australians. The party contested the election but 10 days before the election, the party's lead upper house candidate Chris McDermott announced that he would defect to become an independent if he was elected. Game urged voters to not back her own party in the upper house and the party didn't win any seats in the election receiving just 0.24% of the vote.

== Overall results ==
Government (10) Labor (10) Opposition (6) Liberal (6) Crossbench (6) One Nation (3) Greens (2) Fair Go (1)

Legislative Council (STV) – Turnout 88.8% (CV)
Party	Primary votes				Seats			
Party	Votes	%	Swing (pp)	Quotas	Seats won	Not up	New Total	Change
Labor	417,728	36.7	–0.3	4.4	5	5	10	▲1
One Nation	278,006	24.4	+20.2	2.9	3	0	3	▲2
Liberal	201,823	17.7	–16.7	2.1	2	4	6	▼2
Greens	116,048	10.2	+1.2	1.2	1	1	2	Steady
Legalise Cannabis	26,804	2.4	+0.3	0.3	0	0	0	Steady
Family First	24,452	2.1	–1.0	0.3	0	0	0	Steady
Ungrouped/Independent	15,152	1.3	±0.0	0.2	0	0	0	Steady
Animal Justice	14,843	1.3	–0.2	0.2	0	0	0	Steady
Real Change	11,926	1.0	+0.1	0.1	0	0	0	Steady
SA Best	7,438	0.7	–0.3	0.1	0	0	0	▼2
Better Community	6,862	0.6	New	0.1	0	0	0	Steady
Australian Family	6,147	0.5	–0.4	0.1	0	0	0	Steady
National	5,009	0.4	–0.3	0.1	0	0	0	Steady
Fair Go	3,458	0.3	New	0.0	0	1	1	Steady
United Voice	2,262	0.2	New	0.0	0	0	0	Steady
Total	1,137,958	100.0		12.0	11	11	22	
Informal votes	31,858	2.7	–0.9					
Turnout	1,169,816	88.8	–0.4					
Enrolled voters	1,317,186							
Source: Electoral Commission of South Australia; Australian Broadcasting Corporation

== South Australia ==
2026 South Australian state election: Legislative Council
Party	Candidate	Votes	%	±%
Labor	1. Emily Bourke (elected 1); 2. Mira El Dannawi (elected 5); 3. Justin Hanson (elected 8); 4. Hilton Gumbys (elected 9); 5. Clare Scriven (elected 11); 6. Senthil Chidambaranathan; 7. Awur Deng	417,728	36.7	–0.3
One Nation	1. Cory Bernardi (elected 2); 2. Carlos Quaremba (elected 6); 3. Rebecca Hewett (elected 10); 4. Nathan Skrlj	278,006	24.4	+20.2
Liberal	1. Ben Hood (elected 3); 2. Heidi Girolamo (elected 7); 3. Rowan Mumford; 4. KD Singh; 5. Belinda Crawford-Marshall	201,823	17.7	−16.7
Greens	1. Melanie Selwood (elected 4); 2. Katie McCusker; 3. Christopher Smith	116,048	10.2	+1.2
Legalise Cannabis	1. Jessica Nies; 2. Peter Waters	26,804	2.4	+0.3
Family First	1. Deepa Mathew; 2. Christopher Brohier	24,452	2.1	−1.0
Animal Justice	1. Lionel Pengilley; 2. Geoff Russell	14,843	1.3	−0.2
Real Change	1. Stephen Pallaras; 2. Daniel Pallaras	11,926	1.0	+0.1
Independent (Group O)	1. Craig Pickering; 2. Emily Hutchinson	8,453	0.7	+0.7
SA Best	1. Connie Bonaros; 2. Skye Barrett; 3. Joanna Rowe; 4. John Banelis; 5. Naomi Dewar	7,438	0.7	−0.3
Better Community	1. Jing Lee; 2. Danny Caiazza	6,862	0.6	+0.6
Independent (Group P)	1. Tammy Franks; 2. Faith Coleman	6,309	0.6	+0.6
Australian Family	1. Bob Day; 2. Nicole Hussey; 3. John Day	6,147	0.5	−0.4
National	1. Rikki Lambert; 2. Perrin Rennie	5,009	0.4	−0.3
Fair Go	1. Chris McDermott; 2. Shannon Foote	3,458	0.3	+0.3
United Voice	1. Mark Aldridge; 2. Matilda Bawden	2,262	0.2	+0.2
Independent (Group Q)	Darren Phillips	390	0.0	±0.0
Total formal votes		1,137,958	97.3	+0.9
Informal votes		31,858	2.7	−0.9
Turnout		1,169,816		

== See also ==
- 2026 South Australian House of Assembly election
- Candidates of the 2026 South Australian Legislative Council election
- Members of the South Australian Legislative Council, 2026–2030
