= Sarah Game =

Australian politician

The Honourable Sarah Game MLC

Member of the South Australian Legislative Council
- Incumbent
- Assumed office 19 March 2022
- Preceded by: John Darley

Personal details
- Party: Family First (2026–present)
- Other political affiliations: One Nation (2022–2025); Independent (2025); Fair Go (2025–2026)
- Education: University of Sydney (BVSc)
- Occupation: Veterinarian; teacher
- Website: sarahgame.com.au

Sarah Leslie Game is an Australian politician who has served as a member of the South Australian Legislative Council since 2022. She was the first member of Pauline Hanson's One Nation elected to the Parliament of South Australia, but resigned from the party in May 2025 to become an Independent.

In July 2025 she founded a new party, registered as Sarah Game Fair Go for Australians, usually abbreviated to Fair Go for Australians; in 2026, she announced she would join the Family First Party.

== Early life and education ==
Sarah Leslie Game grew up in a "separated family" in Sydney, New South Wales. Her mother, Jennifer Game, is also a politician.

She studied veterinary medicine at the University of Sydney, graduating in 2006.

== Career ==
=== Early career ===
After graduating, Game moved to the UK to work as a vet, where she transitioned into a second career in teaching biology.

After returning to Australia in 2016, she lived in Adelaide. She was a veterinarian in a practice at South Brighton, a coastal suburb of Adelaide, from July 2021, using the name Sarah Wareing.

=== Political career and views ===
Game was One Nation's first member of the South Australian Parliament.

She has stated that she does not support the banning of foreign language teaching in schools, which had been a One Nation policy before the 2022 election, and that she does not hold to strict interpretations of complex personal issues relating to abortion and transgender issues. She has Jewish heritage and was confirmed Catholic. She had stated "my values are Christian, [but] I don’t align myself now with any particular religion". When she was sworn into the Legislative Council, Game chose to use the affirmation rather than a religious oath.

In her inaugural speech to parliament, she declared her support for "sustainable, cohesive immigration to Australia". David Ettridge, a founding member of One Nation, responded by claiming that Game held "Greens values" that could prompt a split from the party, adding "this is not what One Nation voters voted for".

In 2022, Game supported moves to ban the Nazi Swastika.

Game has expressed her opposition to legislation that would establish an "Indigenous voice to parliament" in South Australia, saying it would divide South Australians based on race, and that One Nation wants "real tangible benefits for all disadvantaged Australians". After the unsuccessful 2023 Australian Indigenous Voice referendum, Game announced plans to introduce a bill to repeal the South Australian state based Voice with the First Nations Voice Act 2023 bill.

On the evening of 16 October 2024, Game was accused of misleading Liberal MLC Michelle Lensink over the SA abortion amendment bill. Lensink who was on leave for cancer treatment, accused Game of lying to her about "pairing" on the bill, which would have seen Lensink's missed vote cancelled out. Game later claimed that no such deal had been made, as the vote was too important to her.

In May 2025, Game resigned from One Nation to sit as an independent. She blamed the way the One Nation brand is perceived and declared she wants to "advocate for all South Australians, regardless of their heritage or religious beliefs". Her mother, who had been leader of the state branch, also left the party, having been denied preselection for the 2026 state election. Pauline Hanson labelled Game as "lazy" as a result of her defection.

In September 2025, Game introduced the Termination of Pregnancy (Restriction on Terminations After 22 Weeks and 6 Days) Amendment Bill 2025 to the upper house, aiming to restrict access to abortions from 23 weeks onwards, which was voted down 8–11.

On 20 May 2026, Game introduced a Bill for an Act to amend the Termination of Pregnancy Act 2021 to prohibit the performance of a termination in South Australia by a medical practitioner on a person who is more than 24 weeks and 6 days pregnant in circumstances other than where the medical practitioner (and in non-emergency situations, the second medical practitioner consulted) considers that 'the termination is necessary to save the life of the pregnant person'. The Bill narrowly passed the upper house 10–9, but was defeated 9–36 in the lower house.

==== Fair Go for Australians ====
In August 2025, she launched Fair Go for Australians which was registered with the Electoral Commission of South Australia on 24 July 2025. On 5 December 2025, she was removed from the party for non-payment of membership dues. The party, which contested the 2026 South Australian state election, is usually abbreviated to "Fair Go Australia" or just "Fair Go".

==== Family First Party ====
In 2026, Game announced she would leave Fair Go Australia and join the Family First Party. Game will be the lead candidate for the party's Legislative Council ticket in the 2030 election.

== Personal life ==
At the time of her election in 2022, Game had three young children, and was raising them as a single parent.

Game's father, Robert Game, died by suicide on 2 February 2023. Following his death, Game voiced her support for increased access to mental health resources, particularly in regional South Australia.
