= Michael Pengilly =

Australian politician

Member of the South Australian House of Assembly for Finniss
- In office 18 March 2006 – 17 March 2018
- Preceded by: Dean Brown
- Succeeded by: David Basham

Personal details
- Born: 3 June 1950 (age 76) Kingscote, Kangaroo Island, South Australia
- Party: Independent (since 2018)
- Other political affiliations: Liberal (until 2018)

Michael Redding Pengilly (born 13 June 1950) is an Australian politician who is the mayor of Kangaroo Island. He formerly represented the South Australian House of Assembly seat of Finniss from the 2006 election to 2018, representing the Liberal Party.

== Career ==
Pengilly is a resident of Victor Harbor, and first served as the mayor of Kangaroo Island as well as chairman of the SA Country Fire Service Board from 1995 to 2000. He was also the chairman of the Hills Mallee and Southern Regional Health Service Board for 8 years. The 2006 election saw Pengilly elected with a two-party margin of 6.5 percent, 9.1 percent less than under Dean Brown. Pengilly recovered 5.8 percent of the two-party vote at the 2010 election. He was elected mayor of Kangaroo Island for a second term in 2018.

== Controversies ==
Pengilly controversially labelled Prime Minister Julia Gillard a "dog" on social media site Twitter on 24 November 2011, following her successful move to boost her government's numbers in House of Representatives by replacing Harry Jenkins as Speaker with Liberal National Party member Peter Slipper. That put Pengilly at risk of losing Liberal preselection for his seat of Finniss. In March the following year he remarked in Parliament that Transport Minister Chloe Fox "ought to be put down, fair dinkum" further jeopardising his preselection chances. The Fox comment was the latest in a series of at least four gaffes.

Pengilly has also supported the prospect of seal culling in South Australia in defense of the interests of the fishing industry. In 2015 he said of the animals:

"Common sense dictates that where seals are way out of control and impacting on fishing, the Government needs to take a common sense approach rather than a foolish, do-nothing situation before (if it’s not happening already) people take the law into their own hands and do it anyway... Seals are in plague proportions, (and they) are not warm and cuddly, but highly invasive, aggressive animals.”

In 2015, Pengilly expressed his support for Oceanic Victor to establish an enterprise similar to Swim with Tuna (which was previously located near Port Lincoln) on and in waters adjacent Granite Island. Pengilly also praised the company's "transparency." Oceanic Victor is directed by Tony Santic of Tony's Tuna International.

Pengilly did not re-contest his seat at the 2018 election.

Pengilly was elected mayor of the Kangaroo Island Council in November 2018, defeating incumbent Peter Clements.

South Australian House of Assembly
Preceded by Dean Brown	Member for Finniss; 2006–2018	Succeeded by David Basham
