= Fair Go for Australians =

Sarah Game Fair Go Sarah Game Fair Go for Australia
- Founder: Sarah Game
- Registered: 24 July 2025; 15 months ago
- Dissolved: 15 October 2026; 25 days ago
- Split from: One Nation
- Ideology: Social conservatism
- Political position: Right-wing

Website
- sarahgame.com.au

Sarah Game Fair Go, officially Sarah Game Fair Go for Australians, was a minor political party that contested the 2026 South Australian state election.

The party was registered in July 2025 by former One Nation member Sarah Game to contest the 2026 South Australian state election, where the party won 0.2% of the vote in the House of Assembly, and 0.3% in the Legislative Council. After Game defected from the party to join Family First, the party was deregistered in October 2026.

== History ==
Fair Go for Australians was founded by Sarah Game, who was elected to the Legislative Council in the 2022 state election as a member of One Nation.

Sarah Game announced that she had left One Nation on 18 May 2025 to sit as an independent in South Australia's upper house, citing problems with the party's brand.

The party was registered with the Electoral Commission of South Australia on 24 July 2025 as Sarah Game Fair Go for Australians and was launched on 14 August 2025 by Game and Adelaide City councillor Henry Davis.

On 16 June 2026, Game announced she would leave Fair Go and join the Family First Party.

The party was deregisted by the Electoral Commission of South Australia on 15 October 2026 as they did not have the appropriate number of members to continue as an eligible political party.

== Policies and stances ==
In December 2025, the party unveiled a policy to abolish local government councils.

In September 2025, Game introduced the Termination of Pregnancy (Restriction on Terminations After 22 Weeks and 6 Days) Amendment Bill 2025 to the upper house, aiming to restrict access to abortions from 23 weeks onwards, which was voted down 8–11.

== 2026 state election ==
On 2 February 2026, former Adelaide Crows player Chris McDermott was announced as the party's lead candidate in the upper house for the 2026 state election, having previously been announced as the candidate for Dunstan.

The party fielded 22 candidates for the 2026 lower house election and two candidates in the 2026 upper house state election. 10 days before the election, McDermott announced that he would defect to become an independent if he is elected. The party failed to win any seats in the election.

== Electoral performance ==
=== House of Assembly ===
Election	Leader	Votes	%	Seats	+/–	Position	Status
2026	Sarah Game	2,746	0.2	0 / 47	Steady	▲11th	No seats

=== Legislative Council ===
Election	Leader	Votes	%	Seats	+/–	Position	Status
2026	Sarah Game	3,458	0.3	0 / 22	Steady	▲14th	No seats
