= David Basham =

Australian politician

The Honourable David Basham MP

Minister for Primary Industries and Regional Development
- In office 29 July 2020 – 21 March 2022
- Preceded by: Tim Whetstone
- Succeeded by: Clare Scriven

Member of the South Australian House of Assembly for Finniss
- In office 17 March 2018 – 21 March 2026
- Preceded by: Michael Pengilly
- Succeeded by: Lou Nicholson

Personal details
- Born: June 1968 (age 57) Victor Harbor, South Australia
- Party: Liberal Party of Australia

David Keith Bernard Basham (born June 1968) is an Australian former politician who served as the Liberal member for Finniss in the South Australian House of Assembly from 2018 until his defeat at the 2026 state election, in a rematch with Independent candidate Lou Nicholson. Basham served as the Minister for Primary Industries and Regional Development in the Marshall Ministry between 2020 and 2022.

Basham was the president of Australian Dairy Farmers before his preselection to run for Finniss.

Political offices
| Preceded by Stephan Knoll | Minister for Primary Industries and Regional Development; 2020–2022 | Succeeded by Clare Scriven |
South Australian House of Assembly
| Preceded by Michael Pengilly | Member for Finniss; 2018–2026 | Succeeded by Lou Nicholson |
