= Lou Nicholson =

Australian politician

Lou Nicholson MP
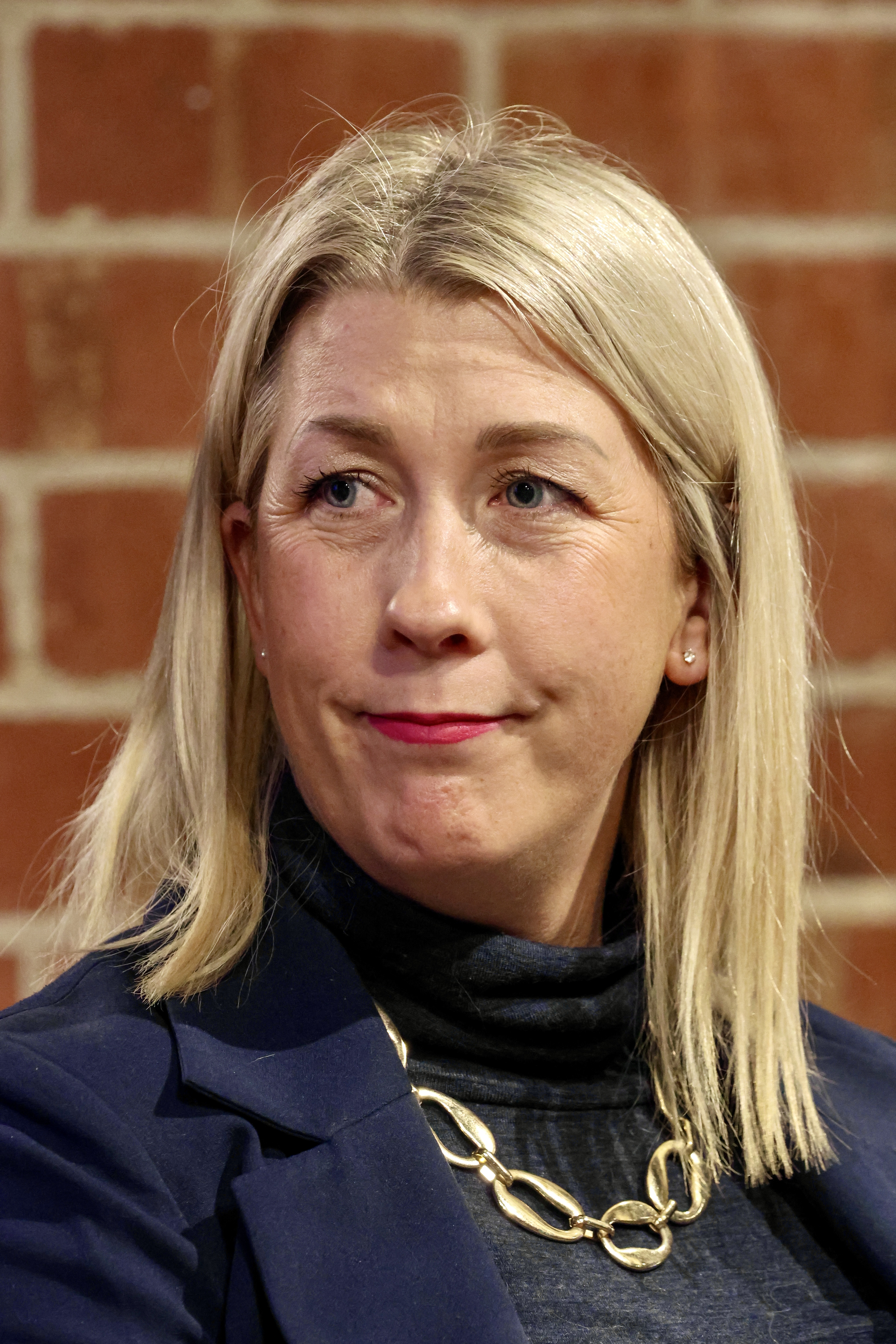
- Nicholson in 2026

Member of the South Australian House of Assembly for Finniss
- Incumbent
- Assumed office 21 March 2026
- Preceded by: David Basham

Personal details
- Born: Papua New Guinea
- Party: Independent

Louise Helene Nicholson is an Australian politician who has represented the district of Finniss in the South Australian House of Assembly since the 2026 state election. An independent politician, Nicholson previously stood for Finniss in 2022, and was elected to Alexandrina Council later that year. Her victory at the 2026 South Australian state election was noted by psephologist Antony Green for being the first time at an Australian state election that a candidate had won after finishing fourth on first preferences.

== Life and career ==
Nicholson was born in Papua New Guinea.

A resident of Goolwa, South Australia, Nicholson first stood for office at the 2022 state election, contesting the district of Finniss as an independent candidate. She stated she was motivated to enter politics by the introduction of "no jab, no play" laws in the South Australian parliament, believing the law should be amended to exclude kindergartens, citing her background in occupational therapy and the importance of education in preventing developmental delay. Those laws, implemented in 2020, prevented childcare providers from enrolling children without up-to-date vaccinations.

Standing against sitting Liberal member David Basham, Nicholson initially held a lead over Basham on election night, but pre-poll ballots put Basham ahead of her, and he retained the seat by 343 votes in the final two-candidate-preferred count.

Following the 2022 election, Nicholson advocated alongside other independents for the state's election funding system to be reformed, arguing that independents faced a needlessly onerous and narrow timeframe to apply for public funding under the current laws. At the local elections later that year, she was successfully elected to Alexandrina Council, representing the Alexandrina West ward.

Nicholson stood for Finniss a second time at the 2026 state election, with Basham also running for re-election as the Liberal candidate. She stated that frequent leadership changes in the Liberal Party had "disappointed and disenfranchised" voters in Finniss, and said that she would focus her campaign on improved hospital and healthcare access. During the campaign, she stated that she observed a supporter of One Nation at a Fleurieu Peninsula polling booth improperly altering how-to-vote cards and adding that the issue was reported to the Electoral Commission.

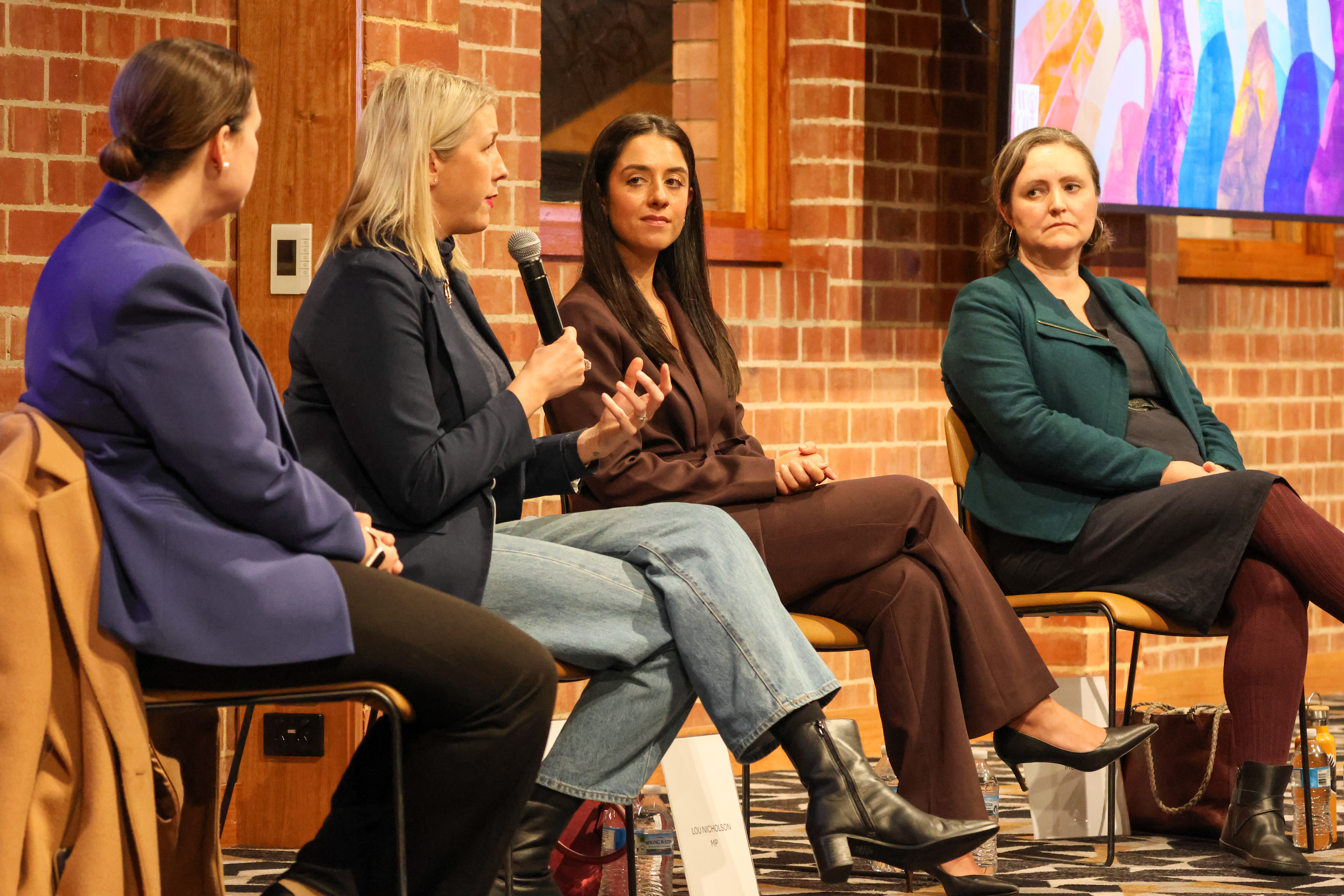
(L–R) Heidi Girolamo, Nicholson, Aria Bolkus and Melanie Selwood at Adelaide University in 2026

Finniss once again could not immediately be called following the 2026 state election. Nicholson initially led Basham on the primary vote count on election night, but Basham had gained after pre-polls reported, and the possibility remained that she could be overtaken by Labor's candidate in Finniss following the distribution of preferences. Despite eventually falling to fourth on first preferences, she was elected as the MP for Finniss, defeating Basham in the two-candidate preferred count following the distribution of preferences. She became the first candidate to win an Australian election at the state level after finishing fourth in first preferences.

South Australian House of Assembly
Preceded by David Basham	Member for Finniss; 2026–present	Incumbent
