= Australian Family Party =

Australian political party

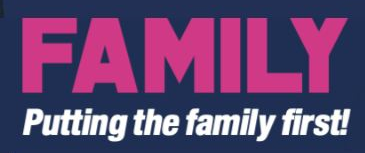
- Founder: Bob Day
- Founded: 28 October 2020; 5 years ago
- Ideology: Social conservatism; Right-wing populism
- Political position: Right-wing

Website
- australianfamilyparty.org.au

The Australian Family Party is a minor right-wing political party that has been registered in South Australia since 2021. It was founded by Bob Day, who served in the Australian Senate from 2014 until 2016 as a member of Family First.

== History ==
=== Formation ===
Bob Day launched the party on 28 October 2020 to "counter the insidious influence of the Greens and the disappointment of the major parties". The party website says that, "Many great organisations and political movements [...] started in churches" and that "The Australian Family Party began the same way." The party was registered by the Electoral Commission of South Australia on 11 November 2021.

Before the 2026 state election, the South Australian branch of the Democratic Labour Party merged with and endorsed the Australian Family Party.

=== 2022 South Australian election ===
At the 2022 state election, it fielded six candidates in the lower house, winning 0.28% of the vote, and two candidates in the upper house, winning 0.86% of the vote.

=== 2026 South Australian election ===
The party fielded candidates in all 47 electorates for the 2026 lower house election and three candidates in the 2026 upper house state election. It stated that six other parties "pledged their support to the Australian Family Party", calling it "The Magnificent Seven". According to the Australian Family Party these were: Gerard Rennick People First, the HEART Party, the Democratic Labour Party (DLP), The Great Australian Party, the Australian Federation Party, and the South Australia branch of the Libertarian Party (Libertarian Party SA).

== Ideology ==
The party has campaigned in favour of the abolition of labour law, increased military self-reliance, federalism, closer ties with Israel, nuclear power, increased regulation of foreign ownership of farming land, decreased government spending, small government, a flat tax system, and free trade.

The party opposes renewable energy, pornography, abortion, surrogacy, euthanasia, prostitution, human cloning, stem cell research, and same-sex marriage. The party also opposes "vaccine mandates, vaccine passports, social distancing, masks, perspex screens [and] lockdowns".

== Electoral performance ==
=== House of Assembly ===
| Election | Leader | Votes | % | Seats | +/– | Position | Status |
|---|---|---|---|---|---|---|---|
| 2022 | Bob Day | 3,043 | 0.28 | 0 / 47 | Steady | ▲9th | No seats |
| 2026 | Bob Day | 9,298 | 0.80 | 0 / 47 | Steady | ▲7th | No seats |

=== Legislative Council ===
| Election | Leader | Votes | % | Seats | +/– | Position | Status |
|---|---|---|---|---|---|---|---|
| 2022 | Bob Day | 9,315 | 0.86 | 0 / 22 | Steady | ▲11th | No seats |
| 2026 | Bob Day | 5,799 | 0.50 | 0 / 22 | Steady | ▼12th | No seats |
