= List of South Australian Legislative Councillors =

This is a list of South Australian legislative councillors since the creation of a statewide electorate in 1975

== List ==
Council	Election	Councilor (Party)	Councilor (Party)	Councilor (Party)	Councilor (Party)	Councilor (Party)	Councilor (Party)	Councilor (Party)	Councilor (Party)	Councilor (Party)	Councilor (Party)	Councilor (Party)	Councilor (Party)	Councilor (Party)	Councilor (Party)	Councilor (Party)	Councilor (Party)	Councilor (Party)	Councilor (Party)	Councilor (Party)	Councilor (Party)	Councilor (Party)	Councilor (Party)	Election	Council
1975-1979	1975	21 Councillors	Don Banfield (Labor)	Frank Blevins (Labor)	John Burdett (Liberal)	Martin Cameron (Liberal Movement/ Liberal)	John Carnie (Liberal Movement/ Liberal)	Tom Casey (Labor)	Brian Chatterton (Labor)	Jessie Cooper (Liberal)	John Cornwall (Labor)	Cec Creedon (Labor)	Boyd Dawkins (Liberal)	Ren DeGaris (Liberal)	Jim Dunford (Labor)	Norm Foster (Labor/ Independent)	Richard Geddes (Liberal)	Murray Hill (Liberal)	Don Laidlaw (Liberal)	Anne Levy (Labor)	Frank Potter (Liberal)	Chris Sumner (Labor)	Arthur Whyte (Liberal)	1975	1975-1979
1975-1979	1976	21 Councillors	Don Banfield (Labor)	Frank Blevins (Labor)	John Burdett (Liberal)	Martin Cameron (Liberal Movement/ Liberal)	John Carnie (Liberal Movement/ Liberal)	Tom Casey (Labor)	Brian Chatterton (Labor)	Jessie Cooper (Liberal)	John Cornwall (Labor)	Cec Creedon (Labor)	Boyd Dawkins (Liberal)	Ren DeGaris (Liberal)	Jim Dunford (Labor)	Norm Foster (Labor/ Independent)	Richard Geddes (Liberal)	Murray Hill (Liberal)	Don Laidlaw (Liberal)	Anne Levy (Labor)	Frank Potter (Liberal)	Chris Sumner (Labor)	Arthur Whyte (Liberal)	1976	1975-1979
1975-1979	1978	21 Councillors	Don Banfield (Labor)	Frank Blevins (Labor)	John Burdett (Liberal)	Martin Cameron (Liberal Movement/ Liberal)	John Carnie (Liberal Movement/ Liberal)	Tom Casey (Labor)	Brian Chatterton (Labor)	Jessie Cooper (Liberal)	John Cornwall (Labor)	Cec Creedon (Labor)	Boyd Dawkins (Liberal)	Ren DeGaris (Liberal)	Jim Dunford (Labor)	Norm Foster (Labor/ Independent)	Richard Geddes (Liberal)	Murray Hill (Liberal)	Don Laidlaw (Liberal)	Anne Levy (Labor)	Trevor Griffin (Liberal)	Chris Sumner (Labor)	Arthur Whyte (Liberal)	1978	1975-1979
1979-1982	1979	Lance Milne (Democrat)	Gordon Bruce (Labor)	Frank Blevins (Labor)	John Burdett (Liberal)	Martin Cameron (Liberal Movement/ Liberal)	John Carnie (Liberal Movement/ Liberal)	Barbara Wiese (Labor)	Brian Chatterton (Labor)	Robert Ritson (Liberal)	John Cornwall (Labor)	Cec Creedon (Labor)	Boyd Dawkins (Liberal)	Ren DeGaris (Liberal)	Jim Dunford (Labor)	Norm Foster (Labor/ Independent)	Legh Davis (Liberal)	Murray Hill (Liberal)	Don Laidlaw (Liberal)	Anne Levy (Labor)	Trevor Griffin (Liberal)	Chris Sumner (Labor)	Arthur Whyte (Liberal)	1979	1979-1982
1979-1982	1982	Lance Milne (Democrat)	Gordon Bruce (Labor)	Frank Blevins (Labor)	John Burdett (Liberal)	Martin Cameron (Liberal Movement/ Liberal)	John Carnie (Liberal Movement/ Liberal)	Barbara Wiese (Labor)	Brian Chatterton (Labor)	Robert Ritson (Liberal)	John Cornwall (Labor)	Cec Creedon (Labor)	Boyd Dawkins (Liberal)	Ren DeGaris (Liberal)	Mario Feleppa (Liberal)	Norm Foster (Labor/ Independent)	Legh Davis (Liberal)	Murray Hill (Liberal)	Don Laidlaw (Liberal)	Anne Levy (Labor)	Trevor Griffin (Liberal)	Chris Sumner (Labor)	Arthur Whyte (Liberal)	1982	1979-1982
1982-1985	1982	Lance Milne (Democrat)	Gordon Bruce (Labor)	Frank Blevins (Labor)	John Burdett (Liberal)	Martin Cameron (Liberal Movement/ Liberal)	Peter Dunn (Liberal)	Barbara Wiese (Labor)	Brian Chatterton (Labor)	Robert Ritson (Liberal)	John Cornwall (Labor)	Cec Creedon (Labor)	Diana Laidlaw (Liberal)	Ren DeGaris (Liberal)	Mario Feleppa (Liberal)	Ian Gilfillan (Democrat)	Legh Davis (Liberal)	Murray Hill (Liberal)	Rob Lucas (Liberal)	Anne Levy (Labor)	Trevor Griffin (Liberal)	Chris Sumner (Labor)	Arthur Whyte (Liberal)	1982	1982-1985
1982-1985	1985	Lance Milne (Democrat)	Gordon Bruce (Labor)	Vacant	John Burdett (Liberal)	Martin Cameron (Liberal Movement/ Liberal)	Peter Dunn (Liberal)	Barbara Wiese (Labor)	Brian Chatterton (Labor)	Robert Ritson (Liberal)	John Cornwall (Labor)	Cec Creedon (Labor)	Diana Laidlaw (Liberal)	Ren DeGaris (Liberal)	Mario Feleppa (Liberal)	Ian Gilfillan (Democrat)	Legh Davis (Liberal)	Murray Hill (Liberal)	Rob Lucas (Liberal)	Anne Levy (Labor)	Trevor Griffin (Liberal)	Chris Sumner (Labor)	Arthur Whyte (Liberal)	1985	1982-1985
1985-1989	1985	Mike Elliott (Democrat)	Gordon Bruce (Labor)	Vacant	John Burdett (Liberal)	Martin Cameron (Liberal Movement/ Liberal)	Peter Dunn (Liberal)	Barbara Wiese (Labor)	Brian Chatterton (Labor)	Robert Ritson (Liberal)	John Cornwall (Labor)	Carolyn Pickles (Labor)	Diana Laidlaw (Liberal)	Terry Roberts (Labor)	Mario Feleppa (Liberal)	Ian Gilfillan (Democrat)	Legh Davis (Liberal)	Murray Hill (Liberal)	Rob Lucas (Liberal)	Anne Levy (Labor)	Trevor Griffin (Liberal)	Chris Sumner (Labor)	Jamie Irwin (Liberal)	1985	1985-1989
1985-1989	1986	Mike Elliott (Democrat)	Gordon Bruce (Labor)	George Weatherill (Labor)	John Burdett (Liberal)	Martin Cameron (Liberal Movement/ Liberal)	Peter Dunn (Liberal)	Barbara Wiese (Labor)	Brian Chatterton (Labor)	Robert Ritson (Liberal)	John Cornwall (Labor)	Carolyn Pickles (Labor)	Diana Laidlaw (Liberal)	Terry Roberts (Labor)	Mario Feleppa (Liberal)	Ian Gilfillan (Democrat)	Legh Davis (Liberal)	Murray Hill (Liberal)	Rob Lucas (Liberal)	Anne Levy (Labor)	Trevor Griffin (Liberal)	Chris Sumner (Labor)	Jamie Irwin (Liberal)	1986	1985-1989
1985-1989	1987	Mike Elliott (Democrat)	Gordon Bruce (Labor)	George Weatherill (Labor)	John Burdett (Liberal)	Martin Cameron (Liberal Movement/ Liberal)	Peter Dunn (Liberal)	Barbara Wiese (Labor)	Trevor Crothers (Labor/ Independent)	Robert Ritson (Liberal)	John Cornwall (Labor)	Carolyn Pickles (Labor)	Diana Laidlaw (Liberal)	Terry Roberts (Labor)	Mario Feleppa (Liberal)	Ian Gilfillan (Democrat)	Legh Davis (Liberal)	Murray Hill (Liberal)	Rob Lucas (Liberal)	Anne Levy (Labor)	Trevor Griffin (Liberal)	Chris Sumner (Labor)	Jamie Irwin (Liberal)	1987	1985-1989
1985-1989	1988	Mike Elliott (Democrat)	Gordon Bruce (Labor)	George Weatherill (Labor)	John Burdett (Liberal)	Martin Cameron (Liberal Movement/ Liberal)	Peter Dunn (Liberal)	Barbara Wiese (Labor)	Trevor Crothers (Labor/ Independent)	Robert Ritson (Liberal)	John Cornwall (Labor)	Carolyn Pickles (Labor)	Diana Laidlaw (Liberal)	Terry Roberts (Labor)	Mario Feleppa (Liberal)	Ian Gilfillan (Democrat)	Legh Davis (Liberal)	Julian Stefani (Liberal)	Rob Lucas (Liberal)	Anne Levy (Labor)	Trevor Griffin (Liberal)	Chris Sumner (Labor)	Jamie Irwin (Liberal)	1988	1985-1989
1985-1989	1989	Mike Elliott (Democrat)	Gordon Bruce (Labor)	George Weatherill (Labor)	John Burdett (Liberal)	Martin Cameron (Liberal Movement/ Liberal)	Peter Dunn (Liberal)	Barbara Wiese (Labor)	Trevor Crothers (Labor/ Independent)	Robert Ritson (Liberal)	Ron Roberts (Labor)	Carolyn Pickles (Labor)	Diana Laidlaw (Liberal)	Terry Roberts (Labor)	Mario Feleppa (Liberal)	Ian Gilfillan (Democrat)	Legh Davis (Liberal)	Julian Stefani (Liberal)	Rob Lucas (Liberal)	Anne Levy (Labor)	Trevor Griffin (Liberal)	Chris Sumner (Labor)	Jamie Irwin (Liberal)	1989	1985-1989
1989-1993	1989	Mike Elliott (Democrat)	Gordon Bruce (Labor)	George Weatherill (Labor)	John Burdett (Liberal)	Martin Cameron (Liberal Movement/ Liberal)	Peter Dunn (Liberal)	Barbara Wiese (Labor)	Trevor Crothers (Labor/ Independent)	Robert Ritson (Liberal)	Ron Roberts (Labor)	Carolyn Pickles (Labor)	Diana Laidlaw (Liberal)	Terry Roberts (Labor)	Mario Feleppa (Liberal)	Ian Gilfillan (Democrat)	Legh Davis (Liberal)	Julian Stefani (Liberal)	Rob Lucas (Liberal)	Anne Levy (Labor)	Trevor Griffin (Liberal)	Chris Sumner (Labor)	Jamie Irwin (Liberal)	1989	1989-1993
1989-1993	1990	Mike Elliott (Democrat)	Gordon Bruce (Labor)	George Weatherill (Labor)	John Burdett (Liberal)	Bernice Pfitzner (Liberal)	Peter Dunn (Liberal)	Barbara Wiese (Labor)	Trevor Crothers (Labor/ Independent)	Robert Ritson (Liberal)	Ron Roberts (Labor)	Carolyn Pickles (Labor)	Diana Laidlaw (Liberal)	Terry Roberts (Labor)	Mario Feleppa (Liberal)	Ian Gilfillan (Democrat)	Legh Davis (Liberal)	Julian Stefani (Liberal)	Rob Lucas (Liberal)	Anne Levy (Labor)	Trevor Griffin (Liberal)	Chris Sumner (Labor)	Jamie Irwin (Liberal)	1990	1989-1993
1989-1993	1993	Mike Elliott (Democrat)	Gordon Bruce (Labor)	George Weatherill (Labor)	Vacant	Bernice Pfitzner (Liberal)	Peter Dunn (Liberal)	Barbara Wiese (Labor)	Trevor Crothers (Labor/ Independent)	Caroline Schaefer (Liberal)	Ron Roberts (Labor)	Carolyn Pickles (Labor)	Diana Laidlaw (Liberal)	Terry Roberts (Labor)	Mario Feleppa (Liberal)	Vacant	Legh Davis (Liberal)	Julian Stefani (Liberal)	Rob Lucas (Liberal)	Anne Levy (Labor)	Trevor Griffin (Liberal)	Chris Sumner (Labor)	Jamie Irwin (Liberal)	1993	1989-1993
1993-1997	1993	Sandra Kanck (Democrat)	Angus Redford (Liberal)	George Weatherill (Labor)	Robert Lawson (Liberal)	Bernice Pfitzner (Liberal)	Peter Dunn (Liberal)	Barbara Wiese (Labor)	Trevor Crothers (Labor/ Independent)	Caroline Schaefer (Liberal)	Ron Roberts (Labor)	Carolyn Pickles (Labor)	Diana Laidlaw (Liberal)	Terry Roberts (Labor)	Mario Feleppa (Liberal)	Vacant	Legh Davis (Liberal)	Julian Stefani (Liberal)	Rob Lucas (Liberal)	Anne Levy (Labor)	Trevor Griffin (Liberal)	Chris Sumner (Labor)	Jamie Irwin (Liberal)	1993	1993-1997
1993-1997	1994	Sandra Kanck (Democrat)	Angus Redford (Liberal)	George Weatherill (Labor)	Robert Lawson (Liberal)	Bernice Pfitzner (Liberal)	Peter Dunn (Liberal)	Barbara Wiese (Labor)	Trevor Crothers (Labor/ Independent)	Caroline Schaefer (Liberal)	Ron Roberts (Labor)	Carolyn Pickles (Labor)	Diana Laidlaw (Liberal)	Terry Roberts (Labor)	Mario Feleppa (Liberal)	Mike Elliott (Democrat)	Legh Davis (Liberal)	Julian Stefani (Liberal)	Rob Lucas (Liberal)	Anne Levy (Labor)	Trevor Griffin (Liberal)	Terry Cameron (Labor/ Independent/ SA First/ Independent)	Jamie Irwin (Liberal)	1994	1993-1997
1993-1997	1995	Sandra Kanck (Democrat)	Angus Redford (Liberal)	George Weatherill (Labor)	Robert Lawson (Liberal)	Bernice Pfitzner (Liberal)	Peter Dunn (Liberal)	Paolo Nocella (Labor)	Trevor Crothers (Labor/ Independent)	Caroline Schaefer (Liberal)	Ron Roberts (Labor)	Carolyn Pickles (Labor)	Diana Laidlaw (Liberal)	Terry Roberts (Labor)	Paul Holloway (Labor)	Mike Elliott (Democrat)	Legh Davis (Liberal)	Julian Stefani (Liberal)	Rob Lucas (Liberal)	Anne Levy (Labor)	Trevor Griffin (Liberal)	Terry Cameron (Labor/ Independent/ SA First/ Independent)	Jamie Irwin (Liberal)	1995	1993-1997
1997-2002	1997	Sandra Kanck (Democrat)	Angus Redford (Liberal)	George Weatherill (Labor)	Robert Lawson (Liberal)	Ian Gilfillan (Democrat)	John Dawkins (Liberal)	Carmel Zollo (Labor)	Trevor Crothers (Labor/ Independent)	Caroline Schaefer (Liberal)	Ron Roberts (Labor)	Carolyn Pickles (Labor)	Diana Laidlaw (Liberal)	Terry Roberts (Labor)	Paul Holloway (Labor)	Mike Elliott (Democrat)	Legh Davis (Liberal)	Julian Stefani (Liberal)	Rob Lucas (Liberal)	Nick Xenophon (No Pokies)	Trevor Griffin (Liberal)	Terry Cameron (Labor/ Independent/ SA First/ Independent)	Jamie Irwin (Liberal)	1997	1997-2002
1997-2002	1998	Sandra Kanck (Democrat)	Angus Redford (Liberal)	George Weatherill (Labor)	Robert Lawson (Liberal)	Ian Gilfillan (Democrat)	John Dawkins (Liberal)	Carmel Zollo (Labor)	Trevor Crothers (Labor/ Independent)	Caroline Schaefer (Liberal)	Ron Roberts (Labor)	Carolyn Pickles (Labor)	Diana Laidlaw (Liberal)	Terry Roberts (Labor)	Paul Holloway (Labor)	Mike Elliott (Democrat)	Legh Davis (Liberal)	Julian Stefani (Liberal)	Rob Lucas (Liberal)	Nick Xenophon (No Pokies)	Trevor Griffin (Liberal)	Terry Cameron (Labor/ Independent/ SA First/ Independent)	Jamie Irwin (Liberal)	1998	1997-2002
1997-2002	1999	Sandra Kanck (Democrat)	Angus Redford (Liberal)	George Weatherill (Labor)	Robert Lawson (Liberal)	Ian Gilfillan (Democrat)	John Dawkins (Liberal)	Carmel Zollo (Labor)	Trevor Crothers (Labor/ Independent)	Caroline Schaefer (Liberal)	Ron Roberts (Labor)	Carolyn Pickles (Labor)	Diana Laidlaw (Liberal)	Terry Roberts (Labor)	Paul Holloway (Labor)	Mike Elliott (Democrat)	Legh Davis (Liberal)	Julian Stefani (Liberal)	Rob Lucas (Liberal)	Nick Xenophon (No Pokies)	Trevor Griffin (Liberal)	Terry Cameron (Labor/ Independent/ SA First/ Independent)	Jamie Irwin (Liberal)	1999	1997-2002
1997-2002	2000	Sandra Kanck (Democrat)	Angus Redford (Liberal)	Bob Sneath (Labor)	Robert Lawson (Liberal)	Ian Gilfillan (Democrat)	John Dawkins (Liberal)	Carmel Zollo (Labor)	Trevor Crothers (Labor/ Independent)	Caroline Schaefer (Liberal)	Ron Roberts (Labor)	Carolyn Pickles (Labor)	Diana Laidlaw (Liberal)	Terry Roberts (Labor)	Paul Holloway (Labor)	Mike Elliott (Democrat)	Legh Davis (Liberal)	Julian Stefani (Liberal)	Rob Lucas (Liberal)	Nick Xenophon (No Pokies)	Trevor Griffin (Liberal)	Terry Cameron (Labor/ Independent/ SA First/ Independent)	Jamie Irwin (Liberal)	2000	1997-2002
2002-2006	2002	Sandra Kanck (Democrat)	Angus Redford (Liberal)	Bob Sneath (Labor)	Robert Lawson (Liberal)	Ian Gilfillan (Democrat)	John Dawkins (Liberal)	Carmel Zollo (Labor)	Gail Gago (Labor)	Caroline Schaefer (Liberal)	Ron Roberts (Labor)	John Gazzola (Labor)	Diana Laidlaw (Liberal)	Terry Roberts (Labor)	Paul Holloway (Labor)	Mike Elliott (Democrat)	Andrew Evans (Family First)	Julian Stefani (Liberal)	Rob Lucas (Liberal)	Nick Xenophon (No Pokies)	David Ridgway (Liberal)	Terry Cameron (Labor/ Independent/ SA First/ Independent)	Terry Stephens (Liberal)	2002	2002-2006
2002-2006	2002	Sandra Kanck (Democrat)	Angus Redford (Liberal)	Bob Sneath (Labor)	Robert Lawson (Liberal)	Ian Gilfillan (Democrat)	John Dawkins (Liberal)	Carmel Zollo (Labor)	Gail Gago (Labor)	Caroline Schaefer (Liberal)	Ron Roberts (Labor)	John Gazzola (Labor)	Diana Laidlaw (Liberal)	Terry Roberts (Labor)	Paul Holloway (Labor)	Mike Elliott (Democrat)	Andrew Evans (Family First)	Julian Stefani (Liberal)	Rob Lucas (Liberal)	Nick Xenophon (No Pokies)	David Ridgway (Liberal)	Terry Cameron (Labor/ Independent/ SA First/ Independent)	Terry Stephens (Liberal)	2002	2002-2006
2002-2006	2003	Sandra Kanck (Democrat)	Angus Redford (Liberal)	Bob Sneath (Labor)	Robert Lawson (Liberal)	Ian Gilfillan (Democrat)	John Dawkins (Liberal)	Carmel Zollo (Labor)	Gail Gago (Labor)	Caroline Schaefer (Liberal)	Ron Roberts (Labor)	John Gazzola (Labor)	Michelle Lensink (Liberal)	Terry Roberts (Labor)	Paul Holloway (Labor)	Kate Reynolds (Democrat)	Andrew Evans (Family First)	Julian Stefani (Liberal)	Rob Lucas (Liberal)	Nick Xenophon (No Pokies)	David Ridgway (Liberal)	Terry Cameron (Labor/ Independent/ SA First/ Independent)	Terry Stephens (Liberal)	2003	2002-2006
2002-2006	2006	Sandra Kanck (Democrat)	Vacant	Bob Sneath (Labor)	Robert Lawson (Liberal)	Ian Gilfillan (Democrat)	John Dawkins (Liberal)	Carmel Zollo (Labor)	Gail Gago (Labor)	Caroline Schaefer (Liberal)	Ron Roberts (Labor)	John Gazzola (Labor)	Michelle Lensink (Liberal)	Vacant	Paul Holloway (Labor)	Kate Reynolds (Democrat)	Andrew Evans (Family First)	Julian Stefani (Liberal)	Rob Lucas (Liberal)	Nick Xenophon (No Pokies)	David Ridgway (Liberal)	Terry Cameron (Labor/ Independent/ SA First/ Independent)	Terry Stephens (Liberal)	2006	2002-2006
2006-2010	2006	Sandra Kanck (Democrat)	Vacant	Bob Sneath (Labor)	Robert Lawson (Liberal)	Ann Bressington (No Pokies)	John Dawkins (Liberal)	Carmel Zollo (Labor)	Gail Gago (Labor)	Caroline Schaefer (Liberal)	Ian Hunter (Labor)	John Gazzola (Labor)	Michelle Lensink (Liberal)	Vacant	Paul Holloway (Labor)	Mark Parnell (Greens)	Andrew Evans (Family First)	Dennis Hood (Family First/ Conservative/ Liberal)	Rob Lucas (Liberal)	Nick Xenophon (No Pokies)	David Ridgway (Liberal)	Russell Wortley (Labor)	Terry Stephens (Liberal)	2006	2006-2010
2006-2010	2006	Sandra Kanck (Democrat)	Stephen Wade (Liberal)	Bob Sneath (Labor)	Robert Lawson (Liberal)	Ann Bressington (No Pokies)	John Dawkins (Liberal)	Carmel Zollo (Labor)	Gail Gago (Labor)	Caroline Schaefer (Liberal)	Ian Hunter (Labor)	John Gazzola (Labor)	Michelle Lensink (Liberal)	Bernard Finnigan (Labor/ Independent)	Paul Holloway (Labor)	Mark Parnell (Greens)	Andrew Evans (Family First)	Dennis Hood (Family First/ Conservative/ Liberal)	Rob Lucas (Liberal)	Nick Xenophon (No Pokies)	David Ridgway (Liberal)	Russell Wortley (Labor)	Terry Stephens (Liberal)	2006	2006-2010
2006-2010	2007	Sandra Kanck (Democrat)	Stephen Wade (Liberal)	Bob Sneath (Labor)	Robert Lawson (Liberal)	Ann Bressington (No Pokies)	John Dawkins (Liberal)	Carmel Zollo (Labor)	Gail Gago (Labor)	Caroline Schaefer (Liberal)	Ian Hunter (Labor)	John Gazzola (Labor)	Michelle Lensink (Liberal)	Bernard Finnigan (Labor/ Independent)	Paul Holloway (Labor)	Mark Parnell (Greens)	Andrew Evans (Family First)	Dennis Hood (Family First/ Conservative/ Liberal)	Rob Lucas (Liberal)	John Darley (No Pokies/ Independent/ Advance SA)	David Ridgway (Liberal)	Russell Wortley (Labor)	Terry Stephens (Liberal)	2007	2006-2010
2006-2010	2008	Sandra Kanck (Democrat)	Stephen Wade (Liberal)	Bob Sneath (Labor)	Robert Lawson (Liberal)	Ann Bressington (No Pokies)	John Dawkins (Liberal)	Carmel Zollo (Labor)	Gail Gago (Labor)	Caroline Schaefer (Liberal)	Ian Hunter (Labor)	John Gazzola (Labor)	Michelle Lensink (Liberal)	Bernard Finnigan (Labor/ Independent)	Paul Holloway (Labor)	Mark Parnell (Greens)	Robert Brokenshire (Family First/ Conservative)	Dennis Hood (Family First/ Conservative/ Liberal)	Rob Lucas (Liberal)	John Darley (No Pokies/ Independent/ Advance SA)	David Ridgway (Liberal)	Russell Wortley (Labor)	Terry Stephens (Liberal)	2008	2006-2010
2006-2010	Feb 2009	David Winderlich (Democrat/ Independent)	Stephen Wade (Liberal)	Bob Sneath (Labor)	Robert Lawson (Liberal)	Ann Bressington (No Pokies)	John Dawkins (Liberal)	Carmel Zollo (Labor)	Gail Gago (Labor)	Caroline Schaefer (Liberal)	Ian Hunter (Labor)	John Gazzola (Labor)	Michelle Lensink (Liberal)	Bernard Finnigan (Labor/ Independent)	Paul Holloway (Labor)	Mark Parnell (Greens)	Robert Brokenshire (Family First/ Conservative)	Dennis Hood (Family First/ Conservative/ Liberal)	Rob Lucas (Liberal)	John Darley (No Pokies/ Independent/ Advance SA)	David Ridgway (Liberal)	Russell Wortley (Labor)	Terry Stephens (Liberal)	Feb 2009	2006-2010
2006-2010	Oct 2009	David Winderlich (Democrat/ Independent)	Stephen Wade (Liberal)	Bob Sneath (Labor)	Robert Lawson (Liberal)	Ann Bressington (No Pokies)	John Dawkins (Liberal)	Carmel Zollo (Labor)	Gail Gago (Labor)	Caroline Schaefer (Liberal)	Ian Hunter (Labor)	John Gazzola (Labor)	Michelle Lensink (Liberal)	Bernard Finnigan (Labor/ Independent)	Paul Holloway (Labor)	Mark Parnell (Greens)	Robert Brokenshire (Family First/ Conservative)	Dennis Hood (Family First/ Conservative/ Liberal)	Rob Lucas (Liberal)	John Darley (No Pokies/ Independent/ Advance SA)	David Ridgway (Liberal)	Russell Wortley (Labor)	Terry Stephens (Liberal)	Oct 2009	2006-2010
2010-2014	2010	Kelly Vincent (Dignity)	Stephen Wade (Liberal)	Bob Sneath (Labor)	Tammy Franks (Greens/ Independent)	Ann Bressington (No Pokies)	John Dawkins (Liberal)	Carmel Zollo (Labor)	Gail Gago (Labor)	Jing Lee (Liberal/ Independent)	Ian Hunter (Labor)	John Gazzola (Labor)	Michelle Lensink (Liberal)	Bernard Finnigan (Labor/ Independent)	Paul Holloway (Labor)	Mark Parnell (Greens)	Robert Brokenshire (Family First/ Conservative)	Dennis Hood (Family First/ Conservative/ Liberal)	Rob Lucas (Liberal)	John Darley (No Pokies/ Independent/ Advance SA)	David Ridgway (Liberal)	Russell Wortley (Labor)	Terry Stephens (Liberal)	2010	2010-2014
2010-2014	2011	Kelly Vincent (Dignity)	Stephen Wade (Liberal)	Bob Sneath (Labor)	Tammy Franks (Greens/ Independent)	Ann Bressington (No Pokies)	John Dawkins (Liberal)	Carmel Zollo (Labor)	Gail Gago (Labor)	Jing Lee (Liberal/ Independent)	Ian Hunter (Labor)	John Gazzola (Labor)	Michelle Lensink (Liberal)	Bernard Finnigan (Labor/ Independent)	Gerry Kandelaars (Labor)	Mark Parnell (Greens)	Robert Brokenshire (Family First/ Conservative)	Dennis Hood (Family First/ Conservative/ Liberal)	Rob Lucas (Liberal)	John Darley (No Pokies/ Independent/ Advance SA)	David Ridgway (Liberal)	Russell Wortley (Labor)	Terry Stephens (Liberal)	2011	2010-2014
2010-2014	2012	Kelly Vincent (Dignity)	Stephen Wade (Liberal)	Kyam Maher (Labor)	Tammy Franks (Greens/ Independent)	Ann Bressington (No Pokies)	John Dawkins (Liberal)	Carmel Zollo (Labor)	Gail Gago (Labor)	Jing Lee (Liberal/ Independent)	Ian Hunter (Labor)	John Gazzola (Labor)	Michelle Lensink (Liberal)	Bernard Finnigan (Labor/ Independent)	Gerry Kandelaars (Labor)	Mark Parnell (Greens)	Robert Brokenshire (Family First/ Conservative)	Dennis Hood (Family First/ Conservative/ Liberal)	Rob Lucas (Liberal)	John Darley (No Pokies/ Independent/ Advance SA)	David Ridgway (Liberal)	Russell Wortley (Labor)	Terry Stephens (Liberal)	2012	2010-2014
2014-2018	2014	Kelly Vincent (Dignity)	Stephen Wade (Liberal)	Kyam Maher (Labor)	Tammy Franks (Greens/ Independent)	Andrew McLachlan (Liberal)	John Dawkins (Liberal)	Tung Ngo (Labor)	Gail Gago (Labor)	Jing Lee (Liberal/ Independent)	Ian Hunter (Labor)	John Gazzola (Labor)	Michelle Lensink (Liberal)	Bernard Finnigan (Labor/ Independent)	Gerry Kandelaars (Labor)	Mark Parnell (Greens)	Robert Brokenshire (Family First/ Conservative)	Dennis Hood (Family First/ Conservative/ Liberal)	Rob Lucas (Liberal)	John Darley (No Pokies/ Independent/ Advance SA)	David Ridgway (Liberal)	Russell Wortley (Labor)	Terry Stephens (Liberal)	2014	2014-2018
2014-2018	2015	Kelly Vincent (Dignity)	Stephen Wade (Liberal)	Kyam Maher (Labor)	Tammy Franks (Greens/ Independent)	Andrew McLachlan (Liberal)	John Dawkins (Liberal)	Tung Ngo (Labor)	Gail Gago (Labor)	Jing Lee (Liberal/ Independent)	Ian Hunter (Labor)	John Gazzola (Labor)	Michelle Lensink (Liberal)	Peter Malinauskas (Labor)	Gerry Kandelaars (Labor)	Mark Parnell (Greens)	Robert Brokenshire (Family First/ Conservative)	Dennis Hood (Family First/ Conservative/ Liberal)	Rob Lucas (Liberal)	John Darley (No Pokies/ Independent/ Advance SA)	David Ridgway (Liberal)	Russell Wortley (Labor)	Terry Stephens (Liberal)	2015	2014-2018
2014-2018	2017a	Kelly Vincent (Dignity)	Stephen Wade (Liberal)	Kyam Maher (Labor)	Tammy Franks (Greens/ Independent)	Andrew McLachlan (Liberal)	John Dawkins (Liberal)	Tung Ngo (Labor)	Gail Gago (Labor)	Jing Lee (Liberal/ Independent)	Ian Hunter (Labor)	John Gazzola (Labor)	Michelle Lensink (Liberal)	Peter Malinauskas (Labor)	Gerry Kandelaars (Labor)	Mark Parnell (Greens)	Robert Brokenshire (Family First/ Conservative)	Dennis Hood (Family First/ Conservative/ Liberal)	Rob Lucas (Liberal)	John Darley (No Pokies/ Independent/ Advance SA)	David Ridgway (Liberal)	Russell Wortley (Labor)	Terry Stephens (Liberal)	2017a	2014-2018
2014-2018	2017b	Kelly Vincent (Dignity)	Stephen Wade (Liberal)	Kyam Maher (Labor)	Tammy Franks (Greens/ Independent)	Andrew McLachlan (Liberal)	John Dawkins (Liberal)	Tung Ngo (Labor)	Gail Gago (Labor)	Jing Lee (Liberal/ Independent)	Ian Hunter (Labor)	John Gazzola (Labor)	Michelle Lensink (Liberal)	Peter Malinauskas (Labor)	Justin Hanson (Labor)	Mark Parnell (Greens)	Robert Brokenshire (Family First/ Conservative)	Dennis Hood (Family First/ Conservative/ Liberal)	Rob Lucas (Liberal)	John Darley (No Pokies/ Independent/ Advance SA)	David Ridgway (Liberal)	Russell Wortley (Labor)	Terry Stephens (Liberal)	2017b	2014-2018
2018-2022	2018	Connie Bonaros (SA Best)	Stephen Wade (Liberal)	Kyam Maher (Labor)	Tammy Franks (Greens/ Independent)	Andrew McLachlan (Liberal)	John Dawkins (Liberal)	Tung Ngo (Labor)	Emily Bourke (Labor)	Jing Lee (Liberal/ Independent)	Ian Hunter (Labor)	Irene Pnevmatikos (Labor)	Michelle Lensink (Liberal)	Clare Scriven (Labor)	Justin Hanson (Labor)	Mark Parnell (Greens)	Frank Pangallo (SA Best/ Independent/ Liberal)	Dennis Hood (Family First/ Conservative/ Liberal)	Rob Lucas (Liberal)	John Darley (No Pokies/ Independent/ Advance SA)	David Ridgway (Liberal)	Russell Wortley (Labor)	Terry Stephens (Liberal)	2018	2018-2022
2018-2022	2018	Connie Bonaros (SA Best)	Stephen Wade (Liberal)	Kyam Maher (Labor)	Tammy Franks (Greens/ Independent)	Andrew McLachlan (Liberal)	John Dawkins (Liberal)	Tung Ngo (Labor)	Emily Bourke (Labor)	Jing Lee (Liberal/ Independent)	Ian Hunter (Labor)	Irene Pnevmatikos (Labor)	Michelle Lensink (Liberal)	Clare Scriven (Labor)	Justin Hanson (Labor)	Mark Parnell (Greens)	Frank Pangallo (SA Best/ Independent/ Liberal)	Dennis Hood (Family First/ Conservative/ Liberal)	Rob Lucas (Liberal)	John Darley (No Pokies/ Independent/ Advance SA)	David Ridgway (Liberal)	Russell Wortley (Labor)	Terry Stephens (Liberal)	2018	2018-2022
2018-2022	2020	Connie Bonaros (SA Best)	Stephen Wade (Liberal)	Kyam Maher (Labor)	Tammy Franks (Greens/ Independent)	Nicola Centofanti (Liberal)	John Dawkins (Liberal)	Tung Ngo (Labor)	Emily Bourke (Labor)	Jing Lee (Liberal/ Independent)	Ian Hunter (Labor)	Irene Pnevmatikos (Labor)	Michelle Lensink (Liberal)	Clare Scriven (Labor)	Justin Hanson (Labor)	Mark Parnell (Greens)	Frank Pangallo (SA Best/ Independent/ Liberal)	Dennis Hood (Family First/ Conservative/ Liberal)	Rob Lucas (Liberal)	John Darley (No Pokies/ Independent/ Advance SA)	David Ridgway (Liberal)	Russell Wortley (Labor)	Terry Stephens (Liberal)	2020	2018-2022
2018-2022	2021	Connie Bonaros (SA Best)	Stephen Wade (Liberal)	Kyam Maher (Labor)	Tammy Franks (Greens/ Independent)	Nicola Centofanti (Liberal)	John Dawkins (Liberal)	Tung Ngo (Labor)	Emily Bourke (Labor)	Jing Lee (Liberal/ Independent)	Ian Hunter (Labor)	Irene Pnevmatikos (Labor)	Michelle Lensink (Liberal)	Clare Scriven (Labor)	Justin Hanson (Labor)	Robert Simms (Greens)	Frank Pangallo (SA Best/ Independent/ Liberal)	Dennis Hood (Family First/ Conservative/ Liberal)	Rob Lucas (Liberal)	John Darley (No Pokies/ Independent/ Advance SA)	Heidi Girolamo (Liberal)	Russell Wortley (Labor)	Terry Stephens (Liberal)	2021	2018-2022
2022-2026	2022	Connie Bonaros (SA Best)	Stephen Wade (Liberal)	Kyam Maher (Labor)	Tammy Franks (Greens/ Independent)	Nicola Centofanti (Liberal)	Laura Henderson (Liberal)	Tung Ngo (Labor)	Emily Bourke (Labor)	Jing Lee (Liberal/ Independent)	Ian Hunter (Labor)	Irene Pnevmatikos (Labor)	Michelle Lensink (Liberal)	Clare Scriven (Labor)	Justin Hanson (Labor)	Robert Simms (Greens)	Frank Pangallo (SA Best/ Independent/ Liberal)	Dennis Hood (Family First/ Conservative/ Liberal)	Reggie Martin (Labor)	Sarah Game (One Nation/ Independent/ Fair Go)	Heidi Girolamo (Liberal)	Russell Wortley (Labor)	Terry Stephens (Liberal)	2022	2022-2026
2022-2026	2023	Connie Bonaros (SA Best)	Ben Hood (Liberal)	Kyam Maher (Labor)	Tammy Franks (Greens/ Independent)	Nicola Centofanti (Liberal)	Laura Henderson (Liberal)	Tung Ngo (Labor)	Emily Bourke (Labor)	Jing Lee (Liberal/ Independent)	Ian Hunter (Labor)	Mira El Dannawi (Labor)	Michelle Lensink (Liberal)	Clare Scriven (Labor)	Justin Hanson (Labor)	Robert Simms (Greens)	Frank Pangallo (SA Best/ Independent/ Liberal)	Dennis Hood (Family First/ Conservative/ Liberal)	Reggie Martin (Labor)	Sarah Game (One Nation/ Independent/ Fair Go)	Heidi Girolamo (Liberal)	Russell Wortley (Labor)	Terry Stephens (Liberal)	2023	2022-2026
2022-2026	Early 2025	Connie Bonaros (SA Best)	Ben Hood (Liberal)	Kyam Maher (Labor)	Tammy Franks (Greens/ Independent)	Nicola Centofanti (Liberal)	Laura Henderson (Liberal)	Tung Ngo (Labor)	Emily Bourke (Labor)	Jing Lee (Liberal/ Independent)	Ian Hunter (Labor)	Mira El Dannawi (Labor)	Michelle Lensink (Liberal)	Clare Scriven (Labor)	Justin Hanson (Labor)	Robert Simms (Greens)	Frank Pangallo (SA Best/ Independent/ Liberal)	Dennis Hood (Family First/ Conservative/ Liberal)	Reggie Martin (Labor)	Sarah Game (One Nation/ Independent/ Fair Go)	Heidi Girolamo (Liberal)	Russell Wortley (Labor)	Terry Stephens (Liberal)	Early 2025	2022-2026
2022-2026	Late 2025	Connie Bonaros (SA Best)	Ben Hood (Liberal)	Kyam Maher (Labor)	Tammy Franks (Greens/ Independent)	Nicola Centofanti (Liberal)	Laura Henderson (Liberal)	Tung Ngo (Labor)	Emily Bourke (Labor)	Jing Lee (Liberal/ Independent)	Ian Hunter (Labor)	Mira El Dannawi (Labor)	Michelle Lensink (Liberal)	Clare Scriven (Labor)	Justin Hanson (Labor)	Robert Simms (Greens)	Frank Pangallo (SA Best/ Independent/ Liberal)	Dennis Hood (Family First/ Conservative/ Liberal)	Reggie Martin (Labor)	Sarah Game (One Nation/ Independent/ Fair Go)	Heidi Girolamo (Liberal)	Russell Wortley (Labor)	Terry Stephens (Liberal)	Late 2025	2022-2026
2026-2030	2026	Cory Bernardi (One Nation)	Ben Hood (Liberal)	Kyam Maher (Labor)	Melanie Selwood (Greens)	Nicola Centofanti (Liberal)	Laura Henderson (Liberal)	Tung Ngo (Labor)	Emily Bourke (Labor)	Hilton Gumbys (Labor)	Ian Hunter (Labor)	Mira El Dannawi (Labor)	Michelle Lensink (Liberal)	Clare Scriven (Labor)	Justin Hanson (Labor)	Robert Simms (Greens)	Carlos Quaremba (One Nation)	Dennis Hood (Family First/ Conservative/ Liberal)	Reggie Martin (Labor)	Sarah Game (One Nation/ Independent/ Fair Go)	Heidi Girolamo (Liberal)	Russell Wortley (Labor)	Rebecca Hewett (One Nation)	2026	2026-2030
