= List of South Australian Legislative Council appointments =

This is a list of appointments to the South Australian Legislative Council, caused by the resignation or death of an incumbent member. A departure creates a casual vacancy which is filled by a candidate of the same affiliation in a joint sitting of the Parliament of South Australia. The constitution states that if the previous sitting Legislative Council member was at the time of his/her election the representative of a particular political party, that party should nominate a replacement from amongst its own members.

== History ==
Until the 1975 election, casual vacancies in the Legislative Council, like the House of Assembly, were also filled at South Australian Legislative Council by-elections. Amendments to the South Australian Constitution and Electoral Acts saw the whole state become a single electorate for the Legislative Council and gave, in line with the Australian Senate, an assembly of members of both Houses of Parliament the right to meet to choose a replacement member.

== List of appointments ==
There have been 29 appointments since 1975: thirteen Labor, ten Liberal, three Democrats, one Family First, one Australian Greens and one independent.

Date	Incumbent	Party	Appointee	Party	Cause
7 March 2023	Stephen Wade	Liberal	Ben Hood	Liberal	Resignation
24 August 2021	David Ridgway	Liberal	Heidi Girolamo	Liberal	Resignation
4 May 2021	Mark Parnell	Greens	Robert Simms	Greens	Resignation
7 April 2020	Andrew McLachlan	Liberal	Nicola Centofanti	Liberal	Resignation
28 February 2017	Gerry Kandelaars	Labor	Justin Hanson	Labor	Resignation
1 December 2015	Bernard Finnigan	Independent ^{[a]}	Peter Malinauskas	Labor	Resignation
17 October 2012	Bob Sneath	Labor	Kyam Maher	Labor	Resignation
13 September 2011	Paul Holloway	Labor	Gerry Kandelaars	Labor	Resignation
17 February 2009	Sandra Kanck	Democrats	David Winderlich	Democrats	Resignation
24 July 2008	Andrew Evans	Family First	Robert Brokenshire	Family First	Resignation
21 November 2007	Nick Xenophon	Independent	John Darley	Independent	Resignation
2 May 2006	Angus Redford	Liberal	Stephen Wade	Liberal	Resignation
2 May 2006	Terry Roberts	Labor	Bernard Finnigan	Labor	Death
26 June 2003	Diana Laidlaw	Liberal	Michelle Lensink	Liberal	Resignation
17 February 2003	Mike Elliott	Democrats	Kate Reynolds	Democrats	Resignation
1 September 2000	George Weatherill	Labor	Bob Sneath	Labor	Resignation
10 October 1995	Mario Feleppa	Labor	Paolo Nocella	Labor	Resignation
26 September 1995	Barbara Wiese	Labor	Paul Holloway	Labor	Resignation
13 September 1994	Chris Sumner	Labor	Terry Cameron	Labor	Resignation
10 February 1994	Ian Gilfillan	Democrats	Mike Elliott	Democrats	Resignation
3 August 1993	Robert Ritson	Liberal	Caroline Schaefer	Liberal	Resignation
23 October 1990	Martin Cameron	Liberal	Bernice Pfitzner	Liberal	Resignation
14 February 1989	Dr John Cornwall	Labor	Ron Roberts	Labor	Resignation
4 August 1988	Murray Hill	Liberal	Julian Stefani	Liberal	Resignation
24 February 1987	Brian Chatterton	Labor	Trevor Crothers	Labor	Resignation
11 February 1986	Frank Blevins	Labor	George Weatherill	Labor	Resignation
1 June 1982	Jim Dunford	Labor	Mario Feleppa	Labor	Death
31 July 1979	Jessie Cooper	Liberal	Legh Davis	Liberal	Resignation
7 March 1978	Frank Potter	Liberal	Trevor Griffin	Liberal	Death

== See also ==
- List of South Australian Legislative Council by-elections
- List of South Australian state by-elections

== Notes ==
^{a} Though Finnigan sat as an independent from 2011, he was elected as a Labor candidate at the 2010 election, as such the joint sitting duly endorsed a Labor appointment.
