= Results of the 2002 South Australian state election (Legislative Council) =

South Australian state election, 9 February 2002 Legislative Council << 1997–2006 >>
Enrolled voters	1,045,563				
Votes cast	983,567		Turnout	94.1	+1.4
Informal votes	53,105		Informal	5.4	+1.1
Summary of votes by party
Party	Primary votes	%	Swing	Seats won	Seats held
Liberal	373,102	40.1	+2.3	5	9
Labor	305,595	32.9	+2.3	4	7
Democrats	68,317	7.3	–9.4	1	3
Family First	47,443	4.0	+4.0	1	1
Greens	25,725	2.8	+1.1	0	0
One Nation	16,829	1.8	+1.8	0	0
No Pokies	11,984	1.3	–1.5	0	1
Voluntary Euthanasia	10,973	1.2	+0.7	0	0
SA First	9,567	1.0	+1.0	0	1
HEMP	8,241	0.9	–0.8	0	0
Grey Power	7,918	0.9	–0.7	0	0
National	4,412	0.5	–0.5	0	0
Other	40,356	4.3	*	0	0
Total	930,462			11	22

This is a list of results for the Legislative Council at the 2002 South Australian state election.

Family First Party would win its first seat in the Legislative Council, They would win a seat at every election until 2014.

== Continuing members ==
The following MLCs were not up for re-election this year.

Member	Party	Term
John Dawkins	Liberal	1997–2006
Diana Laidlaw	Liberal	1997–2006
Rob Lucas	Liberal	1997–2006
Julian Stefani	Liberal	1997–2006
Bob Sneath	Labor	1997–2006
Ron Roberts	Labor	1997–2006
Carmel Zollo	Labor	1997–2006
Mike Elliott	Democrats	1997–2006
Ian Gilfillan	Democrats	1997–2006
Terry Cameron	SA First*	1997–2006
Nick Xenophon	No Pokies	1997–2006

- Terry Cameron was elected in 1997 as a Labor MLC, but quit the party in 1999 and founded his own party, SA First.

== Election results ==
2002 South Australian state election: Legislative Council
Party	Candidate	Votes	%	±%
Quota		77,539		
Liberal	1. Robert Lawson (elected 1); 2. Caroline Schaefer (elected 3); 3. Angus Redford (elected 5); 4. David Ridgway (elected 7); 5. Terry Stephens (elected 8); 6. John Voumard; 7. Ann Bell	373,102	40.1	+2.3
Labor	1. Gail Gago (elected 2); 2. Paul Holloway (elected 4); 3. Terry Roberts (elected 6); 4. John Gazzola (elected 10); 5. Jeremy Moore	305,595	32.9	+2.3
Democrats	1. Sandra Kanck (elected 9); 2. Brian Haddy; 3. Peter Clements; 4. Matilda Bawden	68,317	7.3	−9.4
Family First	1. Andrew Evans (elected 11); 2. Paul Newsham; 3. Anne Bakker; 4. Toni Turnbull	47,443	4.0	+4.0
Greens	1. Brian Noone; 2. Cate Faehrmann; 3. Sarah Martin; 4. Craig Wilkins	25,725	2.8	+1.1
One Nation	1. Neil Russell-Taylor; 2. Colin Gibson	16,829	1.8	+1.8
No Pokies	1. Pat Dean; 2. Chelsea Lewis	11,984	1.3	-1.5
Independent Voluntary Euthanasia	1. Philip Nitschke; 2. Doug McLaren	10,973	1.2	+0.7
SA First	1. Ron Williams; 2. Dannielle Little	9,567	1.0	+1.0
Independent HEMP	Jamnes Danenberg	8,241	0.9	-0.8
Independent Grey Power	1. Sophia Provatidis; 2. Una Pawson	7,918	0.9	-0.7
Independent Labour	Trevor Crothers	4,920	0.5	+0.5
National	1. Paul Brown; 2. Robin Dixon-Thompson	4,412	0.5	−0.5
Save the River Murray	Leonard Spencer	4,271	0.5	+0.5
Cheap Smokes Beer and Spirits	Anna Likouresis	3,378	0.4	+0.4
SA Nuclear Free Future	1. Cherie Hoyle; 2. Ben Aylen; 3. Matthew Young	3,280	0.4	+0.4
Independent Alliance Member Liberal Labour Democrats	1. Mark Aldridge; 2. Kym Fishlock	2,748	0.3	+0.3
Independent No Pokies	Tanya Flesfader	1,946	0.2	+0.2
Independent	Mike Dzamko	1,856	0.2	+0.2
You Can't Beat A Woman	Edith Pringle	1,802	0.2	+0.2
Reform Party	Edith Pringle	1,756	0.2	+0.2
Save Live Music	Jennifer Greer Holmes	1,669	0.2	+0.2
Over-Taxed Smokers	Jenni Dobrowolski	1,666	0.2	+0.2
Genetic Engineering	Sandra Russo	1,422	0.2	+0.2
Dinkum Liberal	Glen Gordon	1,403	0.2	+0.2
Health Tougher Sentences Education Electricity	Paul Della	1,398	0.2	+0.2
Death Sentence for Murderers	Angel Marinoni	1,379	0.2	+0.2
Aboriginal Political Party	Marlene McArthur	1,256	0.1	+0.1
No GST	Rita Hunt	1,201	0.1	+0.1
Better Deal for Public Education	Marlene McArthur	1,022	0.1	+0.1
Community Security and Capital Punishment	Max Tatnell	986	0.1	+0.1
Clubs SA	Michael Keenan	972	0.1	+0.1
Smokers Rights Association	Dennis Robinson	922	0.1	+0.1
More Money for the Unemployed	Anna Eleftheriadis	894	0.1	+0.1
No Nuclear in SA	Kym Hall	890	0.1	+0.1
No Emergency Services Levy	K Johnston	835	0.1	+0.1
Lower Politicians Salaries and Superannuation	John Toro	767	0.1	+0.1
No Nuke Dumps No Pedophiles	Barry Oxer	664	0.1	+0.1
Over-Taxed Motorists	Brett McHolme	636	0.1	+0.1
The Republican Party	Andrew Cole	636	0.1	+0.1
People Power Prosperity	Andrew Stanko	544	0.1	+0.1
Over-Taxed Pokies	Neil Simpson	502	0.1	+0.1
United Australia First	Peter Aslanidis	437	0.1	+0.1
No Empty Promises Just Results	Tauto Sansbury	415	0.04	+0.04
Independent for Referendums	Richard Lutz	309	0.03	+0.03
Independent Conservative	Dean Le Poidevin	292	0.03	+0.03
Road Safety Not Revenue Raising	John Bannon	285	0.03	+0.03
Parents Want Reforms	John Ternezis	152	0.02	+0.02
Total formal votes		930,462	94.6	−1.1
Informal votes		53,105	5.4	+1.1
Turnout		983,567	94.1	+1.4

== See also ==
- Candidates of the 2002 South Australian state election
- Members of the South Australian Legislative Council, 2002–2006
