= Results of the 2006 South Australian state election (Legislative Council) =

South Australian state election, 18 March 2006 Legislative Council << 2002–2010 >>
Enrolled voters	1,055,347				
Votes cast	981,658		Turnout	93.0	−1.1
Informal votes	50,789		Informal	5.2	-0.2
Summary of votes by party
Party	Primary votes	%	Swing	Seats won	Seats held
Labor	340,632	36.6	+3.7	4	8
Liberal	241,740	26.0	−14.1	3	8
No Pokies	190,958	20.5	+19.2	2	2
Family First	46,328	5.0	+1.0	1	2
Greens	39,852	4.3	+1.5	1	1
Democrats	16,412	1.8	–5.5	0	1
One Nation	7,559	0.8	-1.0	0	0
HEMP	6,617	0.7	–0.2	0	0
National	6,237	0.7	+0.2	0	0
Shooters	5,991	0.6	+0.6	0	0
Dignity for Disability	5,615	0.6	+0.6	0	0
Other	22,928	2.5	*	0	0
Total	930,869			11	22

This is a list of results for the Legislative Council at the 2006 South Australian state election.

The Greens would win its first seat in the Legislative Council. The party would win a seat at every election since

== Continuing members ==
The following MLCs were not up for re-election this year.

Member	Party	Term
Gail Gago	Labor	2002–2010
John Gazzola	Labor	2002–2010
Paul Holloway	Labor	2002–2010
Vacant Seat ^{[1]}	Labor	2002–2010
Robert Lawson	Liberal	2002–2010
David Ridgway	Liberal	2002–2010
Caroline Schaefer	Liberal	2002–2010
Terry Stephens	Liberal	2002–2010
Vacant Seat ^{[2]}	Liberal	2002–2010
Sandra Kanck	Democrats	2002–2010
Andrew Evans	Family First	2002–2010

^{1} Sitting Labor MLC Terry Roberts died on 18 February 2006, one month before the election. Labor candidate Bernard Finnigan was appointed as his replacement after the election on 2 May 2006 to serve the rest of Roberts's term.
^{2} Liberal MLC Angus Redford resigned from the Legislative Council in March 2006 in an unsuccessful attempt to shift to the House of Assembly. Liberal candidate Stephen Wade was appointed for the remaining four years of Redford's term on 2 May 2006.

== Election results ==
2006 South Australian state election: Legislative Council
Party	Candidate	Votes	%	±%
Quota		77,573		
Labor	1. Carmel Zollo (elected 1); 2. Bob Sneath (elected 4); 3. Russell Wortley (elected 7); 4. Ian Hunter (elected 9); 5. Jon Gee; 6. Brer Adams; 7. Viv Maher	340,632	36.6	+3.7
Liberal	1. Rob Lucas (elected 2); 2. John Dawkins (elected 5); 3. Michelle Lensink (elected 8); 4. Timothy Keynes; 5. Stephen Wade; 6. Ashley Jared; 7. Bob Randall	241,740	26.0	−14.1
Independent No Pokies	1. Nick Xenophon (elected 3); 2. Ann Bressington (elected 6); 3. John Darley	190,958	20.5	+19.2
Family First	1. Dennis Hood (elected 10); 2. Trevor Grace; 3. Toni Turnbull; 4. Colin Gibson	46,328	5.0	+1.0
Greens	1. Mark Parnell (elected 11); 2. Clare McGarty; 3. Jake Bugden; 4. Sarah Hanson-Young	39,852	4.3	+1.5
Democrats	1. Kate Reynolds; 2. Richard Way; 3. Bec Hill; 4. Paul Rowse	16,412	1.8	−5.5
One Nation	1. Barbara Pannach; 2. Basil Hille	7,559	0.8	−1.0
HEMP	Lisa Crago	6,617	0.7	−0.2
National	1. Deb Thiele; 2. Ian Willcourt	6,237	0.7	+0.2
Shooters	1. Robert Low; 2. Michael Hudson	5,991	0.6	+0.6
Dignity for Disabled	1. Paul Collier; 2. Fim Jucha; 3. Charmaine Mahar; 4. Breige Byrne	5,615	0.6	+0.6
Independent	Peter Lewis	5,370	0.6	+0.6
Ban Live Animal Exports	Jamnes Danenberg	2,754	0.3	+0.3
No Battery Hens	Paulina Toro	2,334	0.3	+0.3
Recreational Fishers	Neil Armstrong	2,118	0.2	+0.2
Reform Party	Stormy Summers	2,106	0.2	0.0
Independent	Mick Dzamko	1,581	0.2	+0.2
Rural/Regional SA	Jan Vrtielka	1,125	0.1	+0.1
Social and Environmental Justice	Michelle Drummond	1,120	0.1	+0.1
Independent Buy Back ETSA	Ralph Clarke	1,115	0.1	+0.1
Independent	Andrew Stanko	993	0.1	+0.1
Aboriginal Representative	Joanne Frya	978	0.1	+0.1
No Drugs	Laury Bais	609	0.1	+0.1
Independent	Terry Cameron	417	0.04	+0.04
Independent	Priya Subramaniam	308	0.03	+0.03
Total formal votes		930,869	94.8	+0.2
Informal votes		50,789	5.2	−0.2
Turnout		981,658	93.0	−1.1

== See also ==
- Candidates of the 2006 South Australian state election
- Members of the South Australian Legislative Council, 2006–2010
