= Members of the South Australian Legislative Council, 1989–1993 =

This is a list of members of the South Australian Legislative Council between 1989 and 1993. As half of the Legislative Council's terms expired at each state election, half of these members were elected at the 1985 state election with terms expiring in 1993, while the other half were elected at the 1989 state election with terms expiring in 1997.

Party	Seats held	1989–1993 Council
Australian Labor Party	10	
Liberal Party of Australia	10	
Australian Democrats	2	

Name	Party	Term expiry	Term of office
Gordon Bruce	Labor	1993	1979–1993
John Burdett	Liberal	1993	1973–1993
Martin Cameron ^{[1]}	Liberal	1997	1971–1990
Trevor Crothers	Labor	1993	1987–2002
Legh Davis	Liberal	1993	1979–2002
Peter Dunn	Liberal	1997	1982–1997
Mike Elliott	Democrat	1993	1985–1993, 1994–2002
Mario Feleppa	Labor	1997	1982–1995
Ian Gilfillan	Democrat	1997	1982–1993, 1997–2006
Trevor Griffin	Liberal	1993	1978–2002
Jamie Irwin	Liberal	1993	1985–2002
Diana Laidlaw	Liberal	1997	1982–2003
Anne Levy	Labor	1997	1975–1997
Rob Lucas	Liberal	1997	1982–2022
Bernice Pfitzner ^{[1]}	Liberal	1997	1990–1997
Carolyn Pickles	Labor	1993	1985–2002
Robert Ritson	Liberal	1993	1979–1993
Ron Roberts	Labor	1997	1989–2006
Terry Roberts	Labor	1993	1984–2006
Julian Stefani	Liberal	1997	1988–2006
Chris Sumner	Labor	1997	1975–1994
George Weatherill	Labor	1997	1986–2000
Barbara Wiese	Labor	1993	1979–1995

^{1} Liberal MLC Martin Cameron resigned on 31 August 1990. Bernice Pfitzner was appointed to the casual vacancy on 23 October 1990.
