= Members of the South Australian Legislative Council, 2010–2014 =

This is a list of members of the South Australian Legislative Council between 2010 and 2014, spanning the 51st (started 2006) and 52nd (starting 2010) Parliament of South Australia. As half of the Legislative Council's terms expired at each state election, half of these members were elected at the 2006 state election with terms expiring in 2014, while the other half were elected at the 2010 state election with terms expiring in 2018.

Party	Seats held	2010 Council
Australian Labor Party	8	
Liberal Party of Australia	7	
Greens	2	
Family First Party	2	
No Pokies	2	
Dignity	1	

Name	Party	Term expiry	Term in office
Ann Bressington	Independent No Pokies	2014	2006–2014
Robert Brokenshire	Family First	2018	2008–2018
John Darley	Independent No Pokies	2014	2007–2022
John Dawkins	Liberal	2014	1997–2022
Bernard Finnigan	Labor/Independent ^{[1]}	2018	2006–2015
Tammy Franks	Greens	2018	2010–present
Gail Gago	Labor	2018	2002–2018
John Gazzola	Labor	2018	2002–2018
Paul Holloway ^{[2]}	Labor	2011	1995–2011
Dennis Hood	Family First	2014	2006–present
Ian Hunter	Labor	2014	2006–present
Gerry Kandelaars ^{[2]}	Labor	2018	2011–2017
Jing Lee	Liberal	2018	2010–present
Michelle Lensink	Liberal	2014	2003–present
Rob Lucas	Liberal	2014	1982–2022
Kyam Maher ^{[3]}	Labor	2014	2012–present
Mark Parnell	Greens	2014	2006–2021
David Ridgway	Liberal	2018	2002–2021
Bob Sneath ^{[3]}	Labor	2014	2000–2012
Terry Stephens	Liberal	2018	2002–present
Kelly Vincent	Dignity for Disability	2018	2010–2018
Stephen Wade	Liberal	2018	2006–2023
Russell Wortley	Labor	2014	2006–present
Carmel Zollo	Labor	2014	1997–2014

^{1} Bernard Finnigan was suspended from the Labor Party on 2 May 2011. He sat in parliament thereafter as an independent.
^{2} Labor MLC Paul Holloway resigned on 15 August 2011. Gerry Kandelaars was appointed as his replacement on 13 September 2011.
^{3} Labor MLC Bob Sneath resigned on 5 October 2012. Kyam Maher was appointed as his replacement on 17 October 2012.
