= Members of the South Australian Legislative Council, 2014–2018 =

Members of the South Australian Legislative Council, 2014–2018

This is a list of members of the South Australian Legislative Council between 2014 and 2018, spanning the 52nd (started 2010) and 53rd (starting 2014) Parliaments of South Australia. As half of the Legislative Council's terms expired at each state election, half of these members were elected at the 2010 state election with terms expiring in 2018, while the other half were elected at the 2014 state election with terms expiring in 2022.

| Name | Party | Term expires | Term of office |
|---|---|---|---|
| Robert Brokenshire | Family First/Conservatives^{[3]} | 2018 | 2008–2018 |
| John Darley | NXT/Independent/Advance SA^{[4]} | 2022 | 2007–2022 |
| John Dawkins | Liberal | 2022 | 1997–2022 |
| Bernard Finnigan ^{[1]} | Independent | 2015 | 2006–2015 |
| Tammy Franks | Greens | 2018 | 2010–present |
| Gail Gago | Labor | 2018 | 2002–2018 |
| John Gazzola | Labor | 2018 | 2002–2018 |
| Justin Hanson ^{[2]} | Labor | 2018 | 2017–present |
| Dennis Hood | Family First/Conservatives ^{[3]} | 2022 | 2006–present |
| Ian Hunter | Labor | 2022 | 2006–present |
| Gerry Kandelaars ^{[2]} | Labor | 2018 | 2011–2017 |
| Jing Lee | Liberal | 2018 | 2010–present |
| Michelle Lensink | Liberal | 2022 | 2003–present |
| Rob Lucas | Liberal | 2022 | 1982–2022 |
| Kyam Maher | Labor | 2022 | 2012–present |
| Peter Malinauskas ^{[1]} | Labor | 2018 | 2015–2018 |
| Andrew McLachlan | Liberal | 2022 | 2014–2020 |
| Tung Ngo | Labor | 2022 | 2014–present |
| Mark Parnell | Greens | 2022 | 2006–2021 |
| David Ridgway | Liberal | 2018 | 2002–2021 |
| Terry Stephens | Liberal | 2018 | 2002–present |
| Kelly Vincent | Dignity | 2018 | 2010–2018 |
| Stephen Wade | Liberal | 2018 | 2006–2023 |
| Russell Wortley | Labor | 2022 | 2006–present |

^{1} Independent MLC Bernard Finnigan, who had been elected as Labor in 2010 and became an independent in 2011, resigned on 12 November 2015. Labor's Peter Malinauskas replaced him on 1 December.
^{2} Labor MLC Gerry Kandelaars resigned on 17 February 2017. Labor's Justin Hanson replaced him on 28 February.
^{3} The Family First Party merged into Cory Bernardi's Australian Conservatives on 25 April 2017. Family First MLCs Robert Brokenshire and Dennis Hood joined the Conservatives.
^{4} Advance SA MLC John Darley, who used to be member and elected as Nick Xenophon Team for close 10 years until he quits in 17 August 2017, for disagreements and shortly become independent for month until he and another former Xenophon affiliate, retired lawyer Peter Humphries decided to form a new State political party named Advance SA.

== See also ==
- Members of the South Australian House of Assembly, 2014–2018
