= Members of the South Australian Legislative Council, 1997–2002 =

This is a list of members of the South Australian Legislative Council between 1997 and 2002. As half of the Legislative Council's terms expired at each state election, half of these members were elected at the 1993 state election with terms expiring in 2002, while the other half were elected at the 1997 state election with terms expiring in 2006.

Party	Seats held	1997–2002 Council
Liberal Party of Australia	10	
Australian Labor Party	8	
Australian Democrats	3	
No Pokies	1	

Name	Party	Term expiry	Term of office
Terry Cameron	Labor/Independent/SA First ^{[1]}	2006	1995–2006
Trevor Crothers	Labor/Independent ^{[2]}	2002	1987–2002
Legh Davis	Liberal	2002	1979–2002
John Dawkins	Liberal	2006	1997–2022
Mike Elliott	Democrat	2006	1985–1993, 1994–2002
Ian Gilfillan	Democrat	2006	1982–1993, 1997–2006
Trevor Griffin	Liberal	2002	1978–2002
Paul Holloway	Labor	2002	1995–2011
Jamie Irwin	Liberal	2002	1985–2002
Sandra Kanck	Democrat	2002	1993–2008
Diana Laidlaw	Liberal	2006	1982–2003
Robert Lawson	Liberal	2002	1993–2010
Rob Lucas	Liberal	2006	1982–2022
Carolyn Pickles	Labor	2002	1985–2002
Angus Redford	Liberal	2002	1993–2006
Ron Roberts	Labor	2006	1989–2006
Terry Roberts	Labor	2002	1984–2006
Caroline Schaefer	Liberal	2002	1993–2010
Bob Sneath ^{[3]}	Labor	2006	2000–2012
Julian Stefani	Liberal	2006	1988–2006
George Weatherill ^{[3]}	Labor	2006	1986–2000
Nick Xenophon	Independent No Pokies	2006	1997–2007
Carmel Zollo	Labor	2006	1997–2014

^{1} Terry Cameron was elected as a Labor MLC, but resigned from the party in August 1998 to support the sale of ETSA. He served as an independent until 25 March 1999, when he founded the SA First party.
^{2} Trevor Crothers was elected as a Labor MLC, but resigned from the party in June 1999 to support the sale of ETSA. He served out the remainder of his term as an independent.
^{3} Labor MLC George Weatherill resigned on 1 September 2000. Bob Sneath was appointed to the resulting casual vacancy on 4 October 2000.
