= Members of the South Australian Legislative Council, 2002–2006 =

This is a list of members of the South Australian Legislative Council between 2002 and 2006. As half of the Legislative Council's terms expired at each state election, half of these members were elected at the 1997 state election with terms expiring in 2006, while the other half were elected at the 2002 state election with terms expiring in 2010.

Party	Seats held	2002–2006 Council
Liberal Party of Australia	9	
Australian Labor Party	7	
Australian Democrats	3	
Family First Party	1	
No Pokies	1	
Independents (*)	1	

Name	Party	Term expiry	Term of office
Terry Cameron	SA First/Independent ^{[1]}	2006	1995–2006
John Dawkins	Liberal	2006	1997–2022
Mike Elliott ^{[2]}	Democrat	2006	1985–1993, 1994–2002
Andrew Evans	Family First	2010	2002–2008
Gail Gago	Labor	2010	2002–2018
John Gazzola	Labor	2010	2002–2018
Ian Gilfillan	Democrat	2006	1982–1993, 1997–2006
Paul Holloway	Labor	2010	1995–2011
Sandra Kanck	Democrat	2010	1993–2008
Diana Laidlaw ^{[3]}	Liberal	2006	1982–2003
Robert Lawson	Liberal	2010	1993–2010
Michelle Lensink ^{[3]}	Liberal	2006	2003–present
Rob Lucas	Liberal	2006	1982–2022
Angus Redford ^{[5]}	Liberal	2010	1993–2006
Kate Reynolds ^{[2]}	Democrat	2006	2003–2006
David Ridgway	Liberal	2010	2002–2021
Ron Roberts	Labor	2006	1989–2006
Terry Roberts ^{[4]}	Labor	2010	1984–2006
Caroline Schaefer	Liberal	2010	1993–2010
Bob Sneath	Labor	2006	2000–2012
Julian Stefani	Liberal	2006	1988–2006
Terry Stephens	Liberal	2010	2002–present
Nick Xenophon	Independent No Pokies	2006	1997–2007
Carmel Zollo	Labor	2006	1997–2014

^{1} Terry Cameron had been elected as a Labor member, but had resigned from the party, initially sitting as an independent, and then founding the SA First party in 1999. He did not face re-election in 2002, but the party disbanded soon after the election, and Cameron subsequently returned to being an independent MLC.
^{2} Democrat MLC Mike Elliott resigned on 10 December 2002. Kate Reynolds was appointed to the resulting casual vacancy on 17 February 2003.
^{3} Liberal MLC Diana Laidlaw resigned on 6 June 2003. Michelle Lensink was appointed to the resulting casual vacancy on 26 June 2003.
^{4} Labor MLC Terry Roberts died on 18 February 2006. Bernard Finnigan was appointed to the remaining four years of Roberts' term on 2 May 2006.
^{5} Liberal MLC Angus Redford resigned on 27 February 2006 to contest the marginal House of Assembly seat of Bright at the 2006 state election. Stephen Wade was appointed to the remaining four years of Redford's term on 2 May 2006.
