= Members of the South Australian Legislative Council, 1982–1985 =

This is a list of members of the South Australian Legislative Council between 1982 and 1985. As half of the Legislative Council's terms expired at each state election, half of these members were elected at the 1979 state election with terms expiring in 1985, while the other half were elected at the 1982 state election with terms expiring in 1989.

Party	Seats held	1982–1985 Council
Liberal Party of Australia	11	
Australian Labor Party	9	
Australian Democrats	2	

Name	Party	Term expiry	Term of office
Frank Blevins ^{[1]}	Labor	1989	1975–1985
Gordon Bruce	Labor	1985	1979–1993
John Burdett	Liberal	1985	1973–1993
Martin Cameron	Liberal	1989	1971–1990
Brian Chatterton	Labor	1985	1973–1987
Dr John Cornwall	Labor	1989	1975–1989
Cecil Creedon	Labor	1985	1973–1985
Legh Davis	Liberal	1985	1979–2002
Ren DeGaris	Liberal	1985	1962–1985
Peter Dunn	Liberal	1989	1982–1997
Mario Feleppa	Labor	1989	1982–1995
Ian Gilfillan	Democrat	1989	1982–1993, 1997–2006
Trevor Griffin	Liberal	1985	1978–2002
Murray Hill	Liberal	1989	1965–1988
Diana Laidlaw	Liberal	1989	1982–2003
Anne Levy	Labor	1989	1975–1997
Rob Lucas	Liberal	1989	1982–2022
Lance Milne	Democrat	1985	1979–1985
Robert Ritson	Liberal	1985	1979–1993
Chris Sumner	Labor	1989	1975–1994
Arthur Whyte	Liberal	1985	1966–1985
Barbara Wiese	Labor	1985	1979–1995

^{1} Labor MLC Frank Blevins resigned on 15 November 1985 in order to contest the Legislative Assembly seat of Giles at the 1985 state election. Due to the proximity of the election, the parliament expired before the casual vacancy could be filled, and George Weatherill was duly appointed to serve out the remaining four years of Blevins' term by the new parliament in 1986.
