= Members of the South Australian Legislative Council, 2006–2010 =

This is a list of members of the South Australian Legislative Council between 2006 and 2010, spanning the 50th (elected in 2002) and 51st (elected in 2006) Parliament of South Australia. As half of the Legislative Council's terms expired at each state election, half of these members were elected at the 2002 state election with terms expiring in 2010, while the other half were elected at the 2006 state election with terms expiring in 2014.

Party	2006	2006 Council	2009	Council @ 2009
Australian Labor Party	8		8	
Liberal Party of Australia	8		8	
Family First Party	2		2	
No Pokies	2		2	
Greens	1		1	
Australian Democrats (*)	1		0	
Independents (*)	0		1	

Name	Party	Term expiry	Term of office
Ann Bressington	Independent No Pokies	2014	2006–2014
Robert Brokenshire ^{[4]}	Family First	2010	2008–2018
John Darley ^{[3]}	Independent No Pokies	2014	2007–2022
John Dawkins	Liberal	2014	1997–2022
Andrew Evans ^{[4]}	Family First	2010	2002–2008
Bernard Finnigan ^{[1]}	Labor	2010	2006–2015
Gail Gago	Labor	2010	2002–2018
John Gazzola	Labor	2010	2002–2018
Paul Holloway	Labor	2010	1995–2011
Dennis Hood	Family First	2014	2006–present
Ian Hunter	Labor	2014	2006–present
Sandra Kanck ^{[5]}	Democrat	2010	1993–2008
Robert Lawson	Liberal	2010	1993–2010
Michelle Lensink	Liberal	2014	2003–present
Rob Lucas	Liberal	2014	1982–2022
Mark Parnell	Greens	2014	2006–2021
David Ridgway	Liberal	2010	2002–2021
Caroline Schaefer	Liberal	2010	1993–2010
Bob Sneath	Labor	2014	2000–2012
Terry Stephens	Liberal	2010	2002–present
Stephen Wade ^{[2]}	Liberal	2010	2006–2023
David Winderlich ^{[5]}	Democrats/Independent ^{[6]}	2010	2009–2010
Russell Wortley	Labor	2014	2006–present
Nick Xenophon ^{[3]}	Independent No Pokies	2014	1997–2007
Carmel Zollo	Labor	2014	1997–2014

^{1} Labor MLC Terry Roberts died on 18 February 2006. Labor candidate Bernard Finnigan was appointed for the remaining four years of Redford's term on 2 May 2006.
^{2} Liberal MLC Angus Redford resigned from the Legislative Council in March 2006 in an unsuccessful attempt to shift to the House of Assembly. Liberal candidate Stephen Wade was appointed for the remaining four years of Redford's term on 2 May 2006.
^{3} Independent MLC Nick Xenophon resigned on 15 October 2007 in order to run for the Australian Senate at the 2007 federal election. Xenophon's second running mate, John Darley, was appointed to the casual vacancy on 21 November 2007.
^{4} Family First MLC Andrew Evans resigned on 3 July 2008. Robert Brokenshire, a former Liberal MHA, was appointed as Evans' replacement on 24 July 2008.
^{5} Democrats MLC Sandra Kanck resigned on 7 November 2008. David Winderlich was appointed as Kanck's replacement on 17 February 2009.
^{6} Democrats MLC David Winderlich resigned from the party on 7 October 2009 and served out his term as an independent.
