= Members of the South Australian Legislative Council, 1979–1982 =

This is a list of members of the South Australian Legislative Council between 1979 and 1982. As half of the Legislative Council's terms expired at each state election, half of these members were elected at the 1975 state election with terms expiring in 1982, while the other half were elected at the 1979 state election with terms expiring in 1985.

Party	Seats held	1979–1982 Council
Liberal Party of Australia	11	
Australian Labor Party	10	
Australian Democrats	1	

Name	Party	Term expiry	Term of office
Frank Blevins	Labor	1982	1975–1985
Gordon Bruce	Labor	1985	1979–1993
John Burdett	Liberal	1985	1973–1993
Martin Cameron	Liberal	1982	1971–1990
John Carnie	Liberal	1982	1975–1982
Brian Chatterton	Labor	1985	1973–1987
Dr John Cornwall	Labor	1982	1975–1989
Cecil Creedon	Labor	1985	1973–1985
Legh Davis	Liberal	1985	1979–2002
Boyd Dawkins	Liberal	1982	1962–1982
Ren DeGaris	Liberal	1985	1962–1985
Jim Dunford ^{[1]}	Labor	1982	1975–1982
Mario Feleppa ^{[1]}	Labor	1982	1982–1995
Norm Foster	Labor/Independent ^{[2]}	1982	1975–1982
Trevor Griffin	Liberal	1985	1978–2002
Murray Hill	Liberal	1982	1965–1988
Don Laidlaw	Liberal	1982	1975–1982
Anne Levy	Labor	1982	1975–1997
Lance Milne	Democrat	1985	1979–1985
Robert Ritson	Liberal	1985	1979–1993
Chris Sumner	Labor	1982	1975–1994
Arthur Whyte	Liberal	1985	1966–1985
Barbara Wiese	Labor	1985	1979–1995

^{1} Labor MLC Jim Dunford died on 12 May 1982. Mario Feleppa was appointed to the resulting casual vacancy on 1 June.
^{2} Norm Foster was elected as a representative of the Labor Party, but left the party in June 1982 in order to cross the floor and support the construction of the Olympic Dam. He served out the remainder of his term as an independent.
