= Paolo Nocella =

Australian politician

Paolo Nocella is a former Australian politician. He was a Labor member of the South Australian Legislative Council from 10 October 1995, when he was appointed to a casual vacancy created by Mario Feleppa's resignation, until 1997, when he was defeated in the general election.
