= Russell Wortley =

Australian politician

The Honourable Russell Wortley MLC

President of the South Australian Legislative Council
- In office 6 May 2014 – 3 May 2018
- Preceded by: John Gazzola
- Succeeded by: Andrew McLachlan

Minister for Industrial Relations
- In office 23 June 2011 – 21 January 2013
- Premier: Mike Rann; Jay Weatherill
- Preceded by: Paul Holloway
- Succeeded by: John Rau

Member of the South Australian Legislative Council
- Incumbent
- Assumed office 18 March 2006
- Preceded by: Terry Cameron

Councillor for the City of Prospect
- In office 2 May 1987 – 1 May 1993
- Constituency: Fitzroy

Personal details
- Born: 21 April 1957 (age 69)
- Party: Australian Labor Party (SA)
- Spouse: Dana Wortley

Russell Paul Wortley (born 21 April 1957) is an Australian politician who has served in the South Australian Legislative Council for the Australian Labor Party since the 2006 South Australian state election. He was President of the South Australian Legislative Council from 2014 to 2018.

== Early life ==
Wortley worked as a plumber and gas fitter before being elected as a union official in 1984. He is a former head of the Gas sub-branch of the Transport Workers Union in South Australia. He was a councillor for the Fitzroy Ward of the Prospect City Council from 1987 to 1993. He has served as a member of a number of government and community organisations including the Occupational Health and Safety Commission, the Workers Appeal Tribunal and the Industrial Relations Advisory Committee. He is a Justice of the Peace.

== Parliament ==
First elected to the Legislative Council in the 2006 South Australian state election, Wortley was re-elected at the 2014 election for a second eight-year term, and again in the 2022 election for a third eight-year term.

Wortley's policy interests include education, health, industrial relations, aged care, environment and natural resources. Wortley has served in many committees and select committees, and served as Minister for Industrial Relations and State/Local Government Relations from 2011 to 2013.

He served as President of the South Australian Legislative Council from 6 May 2014 until 3 May 2018.

== Personal life ==
Wortley is married to fellow state Labor politician Dana Wortley. They have one son.

Parliament of South Australia
Preceded by Terry Cameron; Kate Reynolds; Ian Gilfillan; Ron Roberts; Julian Stefani	Member of the South Australian Legislative Council; 2006–present Served alongside: Multiple Members	Incumbent
South Australian Legislative Council
Preceded by John Gazzola	President of the South Australian Legislative Council; 2014–2018	Incumbent
Political offices
Preceded by Patrick Conlon	Minister for Industrial Relations; 2011–2013	Succeeded by John Rau
Preceded by Patrick Conlon	Minister for State / Local Government Relations; 2011–2013	Succeeded by Gail Gago
