= Andrew McLachlan =

Australian politician (born 1966)

Senator the Honourable Andrew McLachlan CSC
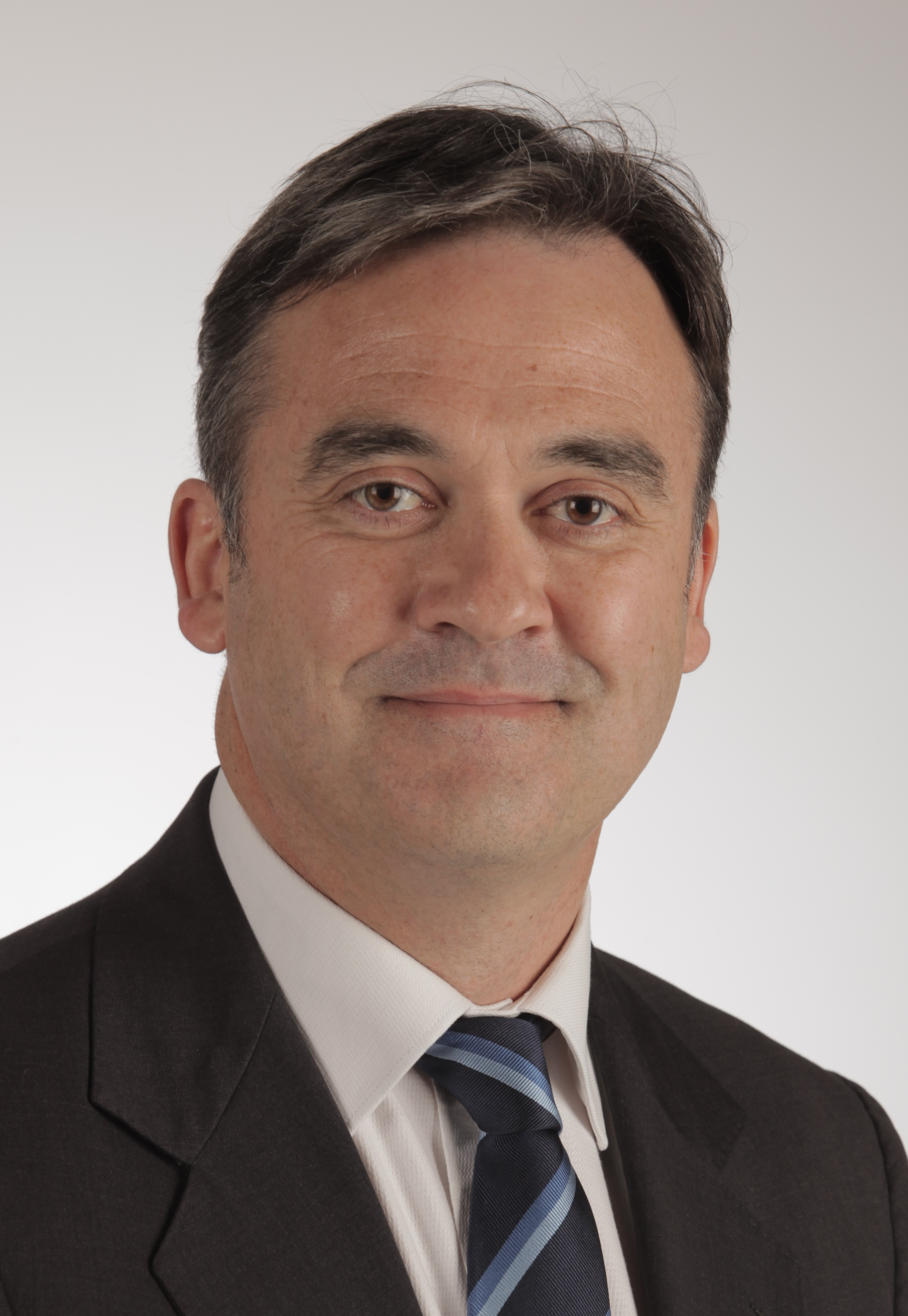

Senator for South Australia
- Incumbent
- Assumed office 6 February 2020
- Preceded by: Cory Bernardi

President of the South Australian Legislative Council
- In office 3 May 2018 – 5 February 2020
- Preceded by: Russell Wortley
- Succeeded by: Terry Stephens

Member of the South Australian Legislative Council
- In office 15 March 2014 – 5 February 2020
- Preceded by: Ann Bressington
- Succeeded by: Nicola Centofanti

Deputy President of the Australian Senate
- In office 26 July 2022 – 22 July 2025
- President: Sue Lines
- Preceded by: Sue Lines
- Succeeded by: Slade Brockman

Personal details
- Born: January 14, 1966 (age 60) Adelaide, South Australia
- Party: Liberal Party of Australia (SA)
- Education: University of Adelaide
- Occupation: Lawyer business executive army officer
- Website: Official website

Military service
- Allegiance: Australia
- Branch/service: Australian Army Reserve
- Rank: Colonel
- Unit: Australian Army Legal Corps
- Battles/wars: War in Afghanistan
- Awards: Conspicuous Service Cross; Commander of the Venerable Order of Saint John

Andrew Lockhart McLachlan CSC (born 14 January 1966) is an Australian politician who has been a Senator for South Australia since 6 February 2020, representing the Liberal Party of Australia. He was previously a member of the South Australian Legislative Council, having been elected at the 2014 state election, and was subsequently elected President of the South Australian Legislative Council in May 2018. He resigned as president and member of the Legislative Council in February 2020, to take up the vacant seat in the Senate caused by the resignation of Cory Bernardi. He was re-elected in 2022, with his term expiring in 2028.

Prior to entering state parliament, McLachlan was a lawyer, army officer and a businessman working in the financial services industry.

== Early life ==
McLachlan was born in Adelaide on 14 January 1966.

He holds a Bachelor of Laws from the University of Adelaide, a Master of Laws from the University of Edinburgh and a Master of Business Administration from the Australian Graduate School of Management (University of Sydney and University of New South Wales).

== Career prior to politics ==
McLachlan commenced his legal career as a young lawyer in regional South Australia, based in Port Augusta.

McLachlan has held senior leadership and executive positions in the financial services industry. He also served on the national executive of the Trustee Corporations Association of Australia and on the compliance and investment boards of the Financial Services Council. He served as the Director of the International Centre for Financial Services at the University of Adelaide. Prior to taking up executive appointments, McLachlan worked as a lawyer specialising in superannuation, banking and finance law. McLachlan is also a Fellow of the Taxation Institute of Australia and the Financial Services Institute of Australasia.

== Political career ==
=== State politics ===
McLachlan was elected to the South Australian Legislative Council at the 2014 state election for an eight-year term.

In March 2015, the 99-year grave licence at Centennial Park for an ANZAC World War I veteran who had fought at Gallipoli expired. No family was located to pay for the continuation of the lease, and there was a possibility of the site being reused. As a fellow veteran, McLachlan paid the licence renewal fee to preserve the historical site.

In July 2015, McLachlan crossed the floor and voted against the Statutes Amendment (Serious and Organised Crimes) Amendment Bill 2015, better known at the time as the 'Bikies Bill', which was contrary to the Liberal Party's position at the time. McLachlan had argued that Parliament should not act like a court and the provision in the Bill breached the principle of the separation of powers. He was the only Liberal Member of Parliament to vote against the Bill. McLachlan is a strong supporter of the rule of law.

In late 2015 McLachlan introduced a Bill that would give legal protections to the identity of individuals who provide sensitive information to journalists. This is a common protection in other Australian jurisdictions, however; in South Australia the current law requires journalists to identify sources during court proceedings or commissions of inquiry, otherwise face a potential prison sentence. The Bill was ultimately not supported by the Government.

In August 2017, McLachlan introduced an amendment to a motion put forward by the SA Greens and Advance SA MLCs calling for the Australian Government to 'recognise the State of Palestine, as we have recognised the state of Israel, and announce the conditions and timelines to achieve such recognition.' McLachlan's amendment called 'on both sides to resume direct negotiations in good faith' and 'on the Commonwealth government to recognise the state of Palestine once the two sides have successfully negotiated a two-state solution, as required by international law.' This amended motion was passed by the South Australian Legislative Council and welcomed by many Jewish organisations including the Australia/Israel Jewish Affairs Council, the Executive Council of Australian Jewry and the Jewish Community Council of South Australia.

At the time of moving his successful amendment, McLachlan told Members of the Legislative Council:

In the land of questionable regimes that are often founded on intolerance, Israel has a vibrant democracy that operates under rule of law and is innovative and prosperous. For Israel to have the security, it needs a viable Palestinian state, a Palestinian state that recognises Israel and rejects violence against the Jewish people. In my own lifetime, I dream of seeing a state of Palestine working cooperatively and collaboratively with its neighbour. Palestinians of all factions must reject violence.

On 3 May 2018, McLachlan was nominated to serve as President of the South Australian Legislative Council being elected by the Members of the Legislative Council unopposed.

=== Federal politics ===
On 1 February 2020, McLachlan was selected by the South Australian Liberal Party to fill a vacant seat in the Australian Senate caused by the resignation of former Liberal Senator Cory Bernardi. McLachlan defeated former Law Council of Australia president Morry Bailes and former state party treasurer Michael van Dissel. He resigned as president and a member of the Legislative Council on 5 February 2020, and was appointed to the Senate by a joint sitting of the South Australian Parliament the following day. He served the remainder of Bernardi's term expiring on 30 June 2022, and was re-elected for another six-year term at the 2022 federal election.

McLachlan is a member of the Centrist faction of the Liberal Party, after previously being aligned with the Moderate/Modern Liberal faction during the Morrison government years.

Parliament of South Australia
Preceded by Ann Bressington	Member of the South Australian Legislative Council; 2014–2020	Succeeded by Nicola Centofanti
Preceded by Russell Wortley	President of the South Australian Legislative Council; 2018–2020	Succeeded by Terry Stephens
Parliament of Australia
Preceded by Cory Bernardi	Senator for South Australia; 2020–present	Incumbent
