= Jing Lee =

Malaysian-Australian politician (born 1967)

The Honourable Jing Lee
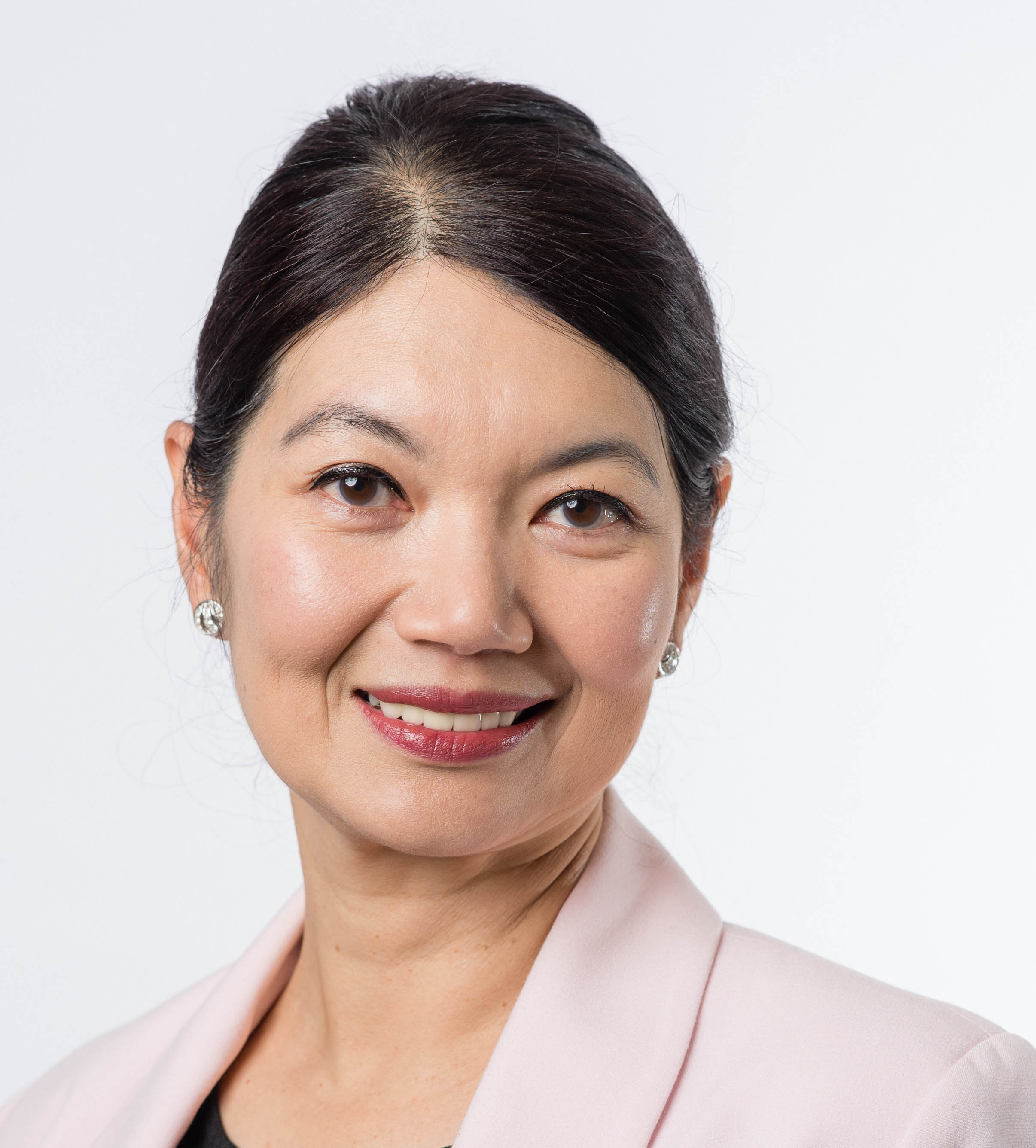
- Lee in 2018

Member of the South Australian Legislative Council
- In office 20 March 2010 – 21 March 2026

Deputy Leader of the Opposition in the Legislative Council
- In office 19 April 2022 – 10 January 2025
- Succeeded by: Heidi Girolamo

Personal details
- Born: Jing Shyuan Lee; 12 July 1967 (age 59) Malaysia
- Party: Jing Lee – Better Community (22 May 2025 – present)
- Other political affiliations: Independent (10 January 2025 – 22 May 2025); Liberal (20 March 2010 – 10 January 2025)
- Education: University of South Australia
- Occupation: Politician
- Website: www.jinglee.com.au

Chinese name
- Traditional Chinese: 李菁璇
- Simplified Chinese: 李菁璇
Transcriptions
Standard Mandarin
- Hanyu Pinyin: Lǐ Jīngxuán

Jing Shyuan Lee (born 12 June 1967) is a Malaysian-Australian politician elected to the South Australian Legislative Council for the South Australian Division of the Liberal Party of Australia since the 2010 state election. She resigned from the Liberal Party on 10 January 2025. She was formerly the president of the Asia Pacific Business Council for Women.

== Early life and education ==
Jing Shyuan Lee was born in Malaysia to a Hakka father and mother from Hainan. She completed primary school in 1979 before emigrating to South Australia at the age of 13. She began her education in Australia through an English language program and then continued in the public school system. After finishing high school, she studied business management at the University of South Australia.

== Political career ==
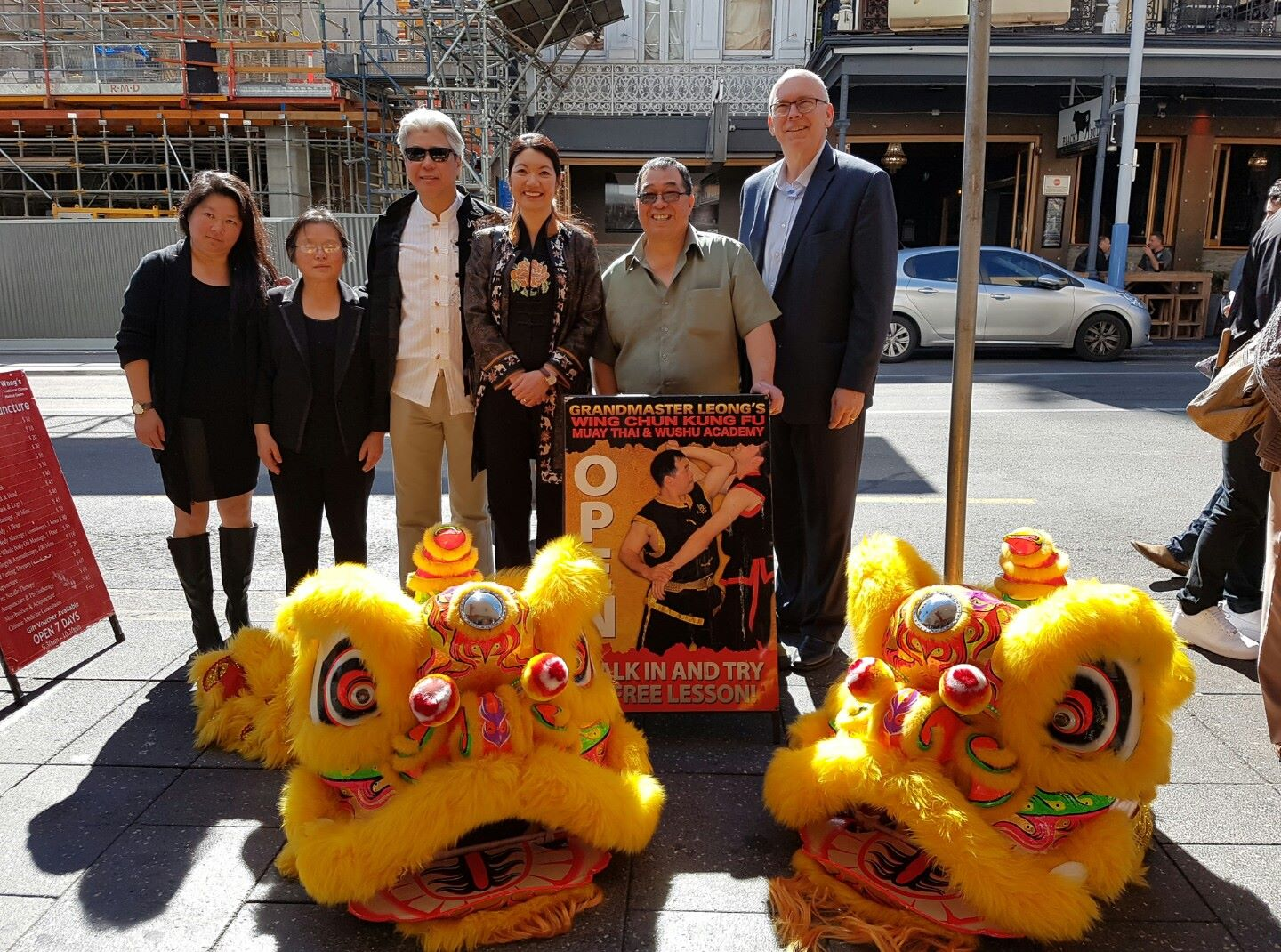
Lee (third from the right) in 2016

Lee entered the South Australian Parliament on 20 March 2010 following the state election. From 8 December 2011 to 8 February 2013, she served as Parliamentary Secretary to the Shadow Minister for Small Business, and concurrently from 8 December 2011 to 24 January 2017, as Parliamentary Secretary to the Shadow Minister for Multicultural Affairs. She then held the position of Parliamentary Secretary to the Shadow Minister for Education, Families and Training from 8 February 2013 to 24 January 2017. From 25 January 2017 to 16 March 2018, she was Shadow Parliamentary Secretary for Multicultural Affairs, Trade and Investment and Small Business.

In March 2018, Lee ran for re-election to the Legislative Council from fourth place on the party's ticket, a position that was not guaranteed due to competition from minor parties. To improve her chances, she conducted an extensive poster campaign across metropolitan Adelaide, focusing particularly on the CBD and Chinatown, using the slogan "stronger together." Supporters helped by placing posters widely to increase her visibility. She was later appointed Parliamentary Secretary to the Premier, serving from 5 April 2018 to 18 March 2022.

In July 2018, Lee was photographed with former presidents of the South Australian Xinjiang Association and the Chinese Consul-General in Adelaide at an event welcoming the consul-general to Australia. The association, described as Han-dominated and supported by China's diplomatic mission, has been criticised by researchers who argue it aligns with the Chinese Communist Party's (CCP) United Front Work Department and promotes narratives that minimise Uyghur persecution in Xinjiang. Lee's involvement with the group was part of her wider engagement with multicultural organisations, some of which have been criticised for political ties to Beijing.

In September 2020, the Liberal Party endorsed Lee as its preferred candidate for president of the South Australian Legislative Council, alongside Josh Teague for Speaker, at a party meeting in Hahndorf. Lee won the party vote against John Dawkins by seven votes to two. However, Dawkins was ultimately elected president by the council and subsequently expelled from the Liberal Party.

Lee's appointment drew scrutiny due to her links with the Xinjiang Association, which denies persecution of China's Uyghur minority. Reports claimed she advised MPs against meeting the Falun Gong group to avoid offending Beijing and supported South Australia joining the One Belt, One Road initiative. She has hosted the Xinjiang Association in Parliament, attended its events alongside Chinese consular officials, and spoken at pro-Beijing functions. Uyghur community leaders in South Australia say Lee has not engaged with their community and accuse the association of acting as a propaganda front.

Concern over her ties led Tony Pasin, Nicolle Flint, and Alex Antic to call for an inquiry, and an online petition requested ASIO investigate her apparent connections to the CCP. Lee denied the allegations, describing them as unfounded and part of a smear campaign motivated by sexism, racism, and political opposition to her candidacy. She defended her work with multicultural groups, including the Xinjiang Association. Following media reports, photos of Lee at association events were removed from her social media accounts, and some federal MPs urged a national security investigation into her reported links to the Chinese government.

In September 2020, Lee was selected by the Liberal Party as its preferred candidate to become President of the South Australian Legislative Council, where the party did not hold a majority. Dawkins also nominated for the role and was elected by the council, leading to his expulsion from the Liberal Party. From 21 April 2022 to 29 January 2023, Lee served as Shadow Minister for Communities. She also held the positions of Shadow Minister for Multicultural South Australia and Shadow Minister for Tourism and Hospitality from 21 April 2022 to 19 August 2024. On 19 April 2022, she was appointed Deputy Leader of the Opposition in the Legislative Council, a role she retained until 10 January 2025. Additionally, from 19 April 2024 to 10 January 2025, she served as Shadow Minister for Multicultural Affairs, and from 19 August 2024 to 10 January 2025, as Shadow Minister for Tourism.

In October 2024, Lee said she was "blindsided by fear" and entered "panic mode" after being put in a situation that made her fear for her Upper House preselection. This pressure led her to withdraw from a pairing arrangement with Michelle Lensink, who was on medical leave for cancer treatment, just minutes before a vote on abortion legislation, forcing Lensink to rush to Parliament. Lee described the incident as a "horrible experience" and said she felt "very vulnerable," without naming who in the party was responsible. On 10 January 2025, Lee resigned from the Liberal Party to sit as an Independent, citing the 2023 parliamentary dispute over abortion legislation and concerns about her preselection position as key factors. She stepped down from her Shadow Portfolios, with Vincent Tarzia expressing disappointment.

=== Jing Lee – Better Community ===
Jing Lee – Better Community
- Leader: Jing Lee
- Founded: 19 May 2025
- Registered: 22 May 2025
- Dissolved: 24 September 2026
- Ideology: Localism
- Colors: Purple
- Slogan: Putting community first
- SA Legislative Council: 0 / 22

Website
- jinglee.com.au

On 19 May 2025, Lee announced the formation of Jing Lee – Better Community, a new political party. The party was officially registered on 22 May 2025.

Better Community ran two candidates for the Legislative Council at the 2026 South Australian state election: Lee and support candidate Danny Caiazza. The party did not recommend preferences to any other parties. Neither candidate was successful.

Following her retirement from parliament at the 2026 State Election, Lee was granted the title The Honourable for life by the Governor.

Jing Lee – Better Community was deregistered as a political party on 24 September 2026 for having an insufficient number of members to function as a political party in the future.
