= Jim Dunford =

Australian trade unionist and politician

James Edward Dunford (10 April 1930 – 12 May 1982) was a trade unionist and politician in the State of South Australia.

He made headlines when, as state secretary of the Australian Workers' Union, he was found personally responsible for substantial court costs incurred when a Kangaroo Island farmer successfully sued the AWU for a black ban they placed on transport of goods to and from islanders who had employed non-union shearers.

He was elected to the South Australian Legislative Council in July 1975 and died in office in May 1982.
