= Gerry Kandelaars =

Australian politician

Gerry Kandelaars MLC
- In office 13 September 2011 – 17 February 2017

Personal details
- Born: 1953 or 1954 (age 71–72)
- Party: Australian Labor Party (SA)

Gerard Anthony (Gerry) Kandelaars is a former Australian politician who was a member of the South Australian Legislative Council for the Australian Labor Party from 2011 to 2017.

== Early life ==
Kandelaars was born in Australia after his Dutch parents Leo and Nelly left the Netherlands after World War II.

Kandelaars worked in the telecommunications industry for over 20 years, including as a telecommunications tradesman with the PMG Department and Principal Technical Officer in Telstra's Forward Planning Section. He moved to the role of state branch secretary and then branch president of the Communications, Electrical and Plumbing Union's T&S Branch. He was a board member of PEER VEET (a Group Training Company and Registered Training Organisation), and on the Information Industries Training Advisory Board, as well as the Electrotechnology and Water Skills Board. He was also a director on the Board of Telstra Super, Australia's largest corporate superannuation fund with over $11 billion in funds under management and was a member of its Audit, Risk and Management Committee and its Remuneration Committee.

== Politics ==
Kandelaars previously worked for Labor MP Robyn Geraghty. He gained Labor preselection to the Legislative Council in a joint sitting of the Parliament of South Australia on 13 September 2011 to replace outgoing MLC Paul Holloway.

A moderate member of the Labor Right faction, he advocated for gay rights.

Kandelaars expressed dismay at prejudice towards migrants in South Australian society and condemned Liberal Senator Cory Bernardi for his support of Dutch far-right politician Geert Wilders.

Kandelaars affirmed his commitment to the union movement, saying "I am still a member of the union today and proud of the difference it and other unions have made and continue to make to the lives of ordinary workers. Despite the thinking of some in this place, unions continue to play an important role in our society".

Kandelaars resigned from parliament on 17 February 2017 to care for his sick wife, which created a casual vacancy and subsequent appointment. The vacancy was filled by Justin Hanson.

== Personal life ==
Kandelaars is married to Glenys and has two adult children.
