= John Burdett (politician) =

Australian politician

John Charles Burdett (13 March 1928 – 25 November 1993) was an Australian politician. He was a Liberal member of the South Australian Legislative Council from 1973 to 1993; he died shortly before he was due to retire at the general election. He was Minister for Consumer Affairs and Community Welfare from 1979 to 1982.
