= Robert Ritson =

Australian politician

Robert John Ritson (1 August 1936 – 20 July 2013) was an Australian politician. He was a Liberal member of the South Australian Legislative Council from 1979 to 1993.
