= Mike Elliott (Australian politician) =

Australian politician (born 1952)

Member of the South Australian Legislative Council
- In office 7 December 1985 – 18 November 1993
- Preceded by: Lance Milne
- In office 10 February 1994 – 10 December 2002
- Succeeded by: Kate Reynolds

Personal details
- Born: Michael John Elliott; 29 August 1952 (age 74)
- Party: Australian Democrats
- Education: Bachelor of Science, Graduate Diploma of Teaching
- Alma mater: University of Adelaide
- Occupation: Teacher

Michael John Elliott (born 29 August 1952) is an Australian former politician. He was an Australian Democrats member of the South Australian Legislative Council from 1985 until 1993 and from 1994 until 2002, and was the party's state leader from 1994 to 2002.

Elliott graduated from the University of Adelaide with a Bachelor of Science, and later achieved a Graduate Diploma of Teaching. In 1985 he was elected to the South Australian Legislative Council as a Democrat, having won the top position on the party's ticket in a contentious preselection contest between the party's left and right factions following the retirement of Lance Milne.

In 1987, he introduced a successful bill that drastically restricted cigarette advertising in South Australia. He resigned in 1993 in an unsuccessful attempt to switch to the House of Assembly seat of Davenport at the 1993 state election but was reappointed in 1994 upon the resignation of Ian Gilfillan, serving until his retirement in 2002. He was subsequently appointed director of the University of South Australia's Northern Adelaide Partnerships program.
