= Legh Davis =

Australian politician (1940–2026)

The Honourable Legh Davis AM
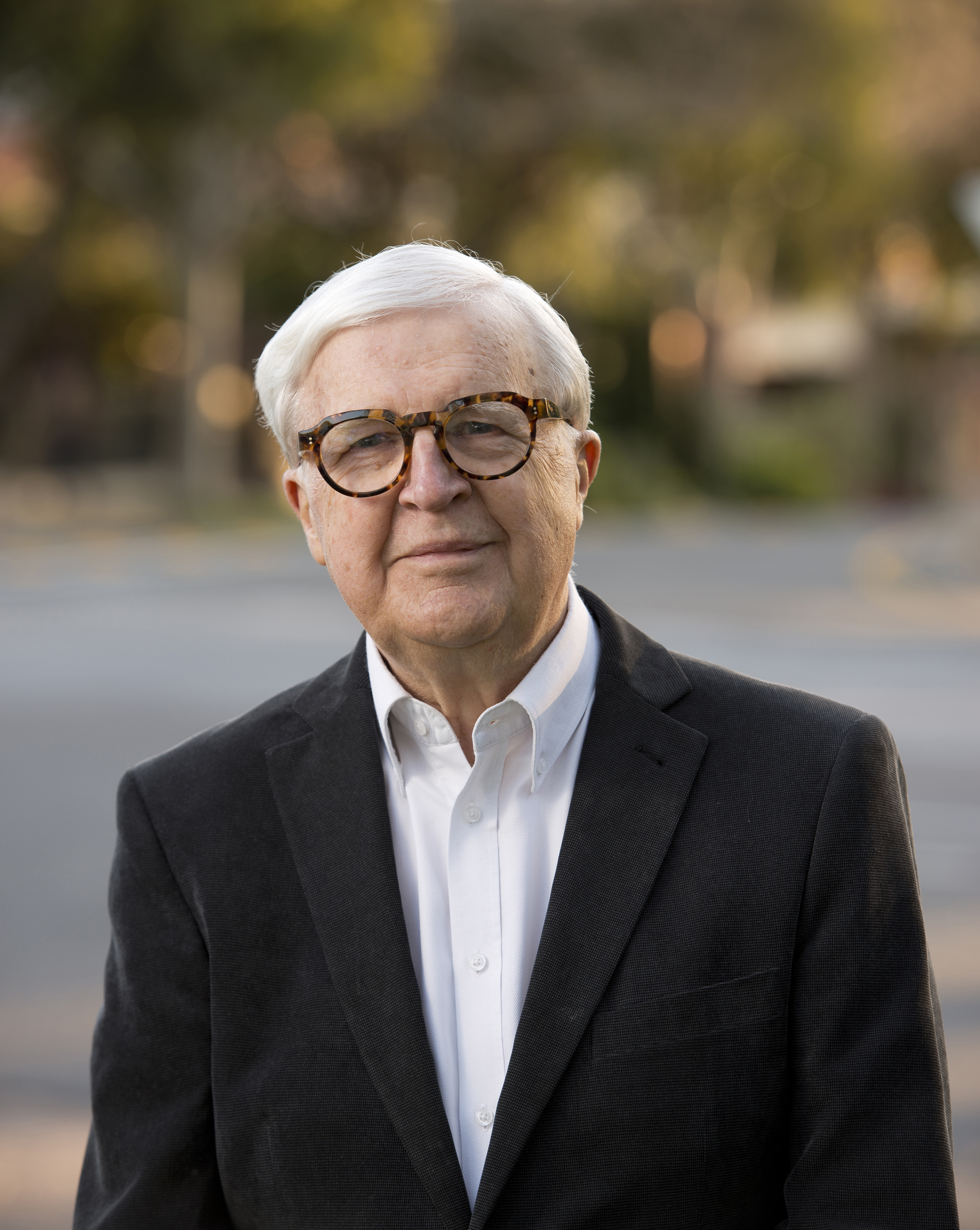

Member of the South Australian Legislative Council
- In office 31 July 1979 – 9 February 2002

Personal details
- Born: Legh Hewitson Davis; 19 September 1940 Adelaide, South Australia, Australia
- Died: 10 May 2026 (aged 85)
- Party: Liberal Party
- Education: Bachelor of Laws (Hons), Bachelor of Economics, University of South Australia
- Occupation: Politician
- Profession: Investment consultant, lecturer

Legh Hewitson Davis (19 September 1940 – 10 May 2026) was an Australian politician who was President of the Liberal Party of South Australia. Davis was elected to the South Australian Legislative Council in 1979 as a member of the Liberal Party serving until his retirement at the State Election in February 2002. During his parliamentary tenure, Davis held the position of Deputy Leader of the Opposition in the Legislative Council between 1985-89 and acted as the party spokesman across several portfolio areas including, Finance, Arts, Small Business, Housing, Forests, and Ethnic affairs. He served as the Presiding Member of the Statutory Authorities Review Committee, as Chairman of the State Development Fund, and the Adelaide Festival Centre. In addition to his political career, Davis worked as an investment adviser and later became State Manager of investment firm AC Goode & Co. After retiring from Parliament, Davis served as State Chairman of sharebroker AMRO Morgans and Director of Morgans Adelaide. Davis was a Fellow of the Certified Practising Accountants.

== Education ==
Davis attended Prince Alfred College, where he completed his secondary school education in 1957. He graduated from the University of Adelaide with a Bachelor of Economics in 1961 and later obtained a Bachelor of Law in 1965.

== Career ==
After graduating University, Davis became an active member of the Young Liberal Movement of Australia. From 1966 to 1969, he served as State President and under his leadership, Davis was credited with providing “a renewed sense of direction and coordination to the Young Liberal Movement and thus membership substantially increased”. In 1970 Davis became Federal Chairman of the movement and held the position until 1972.

In 1965, Davis joined the Law and Economics faculty at the South Australian Institute of Technology (now the University of South Australia), where he lectured for four years.

In 1968 Davis joined national sharebroker A C Goode & Co, as an investment adviser, and was later appointed State Manager of the firm in 1978, he remained there until 1990.

In 1979, Davis was elected to the South Australian Legislative Council, serving as Deputy Leader of the Opposition from 1985 to 1989. During his tenure in Parliament, Davis was Shadow Minister for the Arts from 1985 to 1989 and again from 1991 to 1992, he held numerous other shadow ministerial portfolios, including Housing and Construction, Finance, The Ageing, Small Business, Forests, Ethnic Affairs, and Corporate Affairs. From 1994 to 1997, Davis was the presiding member of the Statutory Authorities Review Committee, which evaluated the role, performance, and ongoing relevance of state agencies and independent public bodies.

After retiring from Parliament in 2002, Davis became State Chairman of sharebroker ABN AMRO Morgans and Director of Morgans Adelaide, and held the positions until 2010. After AMRO Morgans rebranded as Morgans Financial, he continued with the firm as Senior Consultant.

In 2003, Davis served as State Treasurer of the Liberal Party and held the position until 2005.

In 2005, Davis became Chairman of the State Development Fund which provided equity capital to small and medium sized Australian companies.

In September 2020, Davis was elected State President of the South Australian Liberal Party, and held the position until the end of his term in late 2022.

== Community activities ==
In 2003, Davis joined the board of Artbank, a national art rental and collecting scheme designed to support Australian contemporary artists through acquisitions and the promotion of their work to the broader public.

In 2008, Davis was appointed to the board of the Adelaide Festival Centre Foundation, a charitable organisation which aims to make the arts accessible to all South Australians. In 2014, Davis became Chair of the foundation, serving two three-year terms before stepping down in December 2020. During his tenure as Chair, Davis, alongside the Foundation's Philanthropy manager, Robyn Brown, contributed to raising $5.5 million toward the $66 million upgrade and renewal of Her Majesty's Theatre over six years.

== Death ==
Davis died on 10 May 2026 at the age of 85.

== Awards ==
In 2001, Davis was awarded a Centenary Medal "for long service to public life through the parliament and to charity". He was posthumously appointed a Member of the Order of Australia in the 2026 King's Birthday Honours in recognition of his "significant service to the arts, to philanthropy, and to the community of South Australia".
