= Bernard Finnigan =

Australian politician (born 1972)

Minister for Industrial Relations, State / Local Government Relations and Gambling
- In office 8 February 2011 – 21 April 2011
- Premier: Mike Rann
- Preceded by: Paul Holloway
- Succeeded by: Patrick Conlon, Gail Gago

Member of the South Australian Legislative Council
- In office 2 May 2006 – 12 November 2015
- Preceded by: Terry Roberts
- Succeeded by: Peter Malinauskas

Personal details
- Born: Bernard Vincent Finnigan; 8 December 1972 (age 53) Mount Gambier, South Australia, Australia
- Party: Labor (2006–11); Independent (2011–15)
- Education: University of Adelaide
- Occupation: Union official

Bernard Vincent Finnigan (born 8 December 1972) is an Australian former politician who served as a member of the South Australian Legislative Council from 2006 until 2015. He was appointed in May 2006 as a member of the South Australian Branch of the Australian Labor Party to the Legislative Council in a casual vacancy triggered by the death of Terry Roberts. Elected at the 2010 election, Finnigan briefly served in the Rann government cabinet from February until April in 2011, when Labor suspended him from the party, sitting thereafter as an independent backbencher until his 2015 parliamentary resignation. He was the Acting Police Minister at the time of his arrest.

Labor suspended Finnigan from the party pending the verdict of a criminal trial after he was charged with child pornography offences in 2011, totalling 30 various charges over time. Only two charges ended up proceeding to trial – on 10 November 2015, Finnigan was found not guilty of one count for attempting to access child pornography, however he was found guilty of one count of accessing child pornography. Finnigan announced his immediate parliamentary resignation on 12 November. On 9 December following sentencing submissions, Finnigan had a conviction recorded, was added to the sex offenders register, and was given a 15-month suspended sentence with a three-year $1,000 good behaviour bond.

Peter Malinauskas filled the upper house casual vacancy in a joint sitting of the Parliament of South Australia on 1 December.

== Early life ==
One of twelve children, Finnigan was born in 1972 in Mount Gambier, South Australia and grew up in nearby Eight Mile Creek on the family's dairy farm. He attended Allendale East Area School and Tenison Woods College in Mount Gambier before attending the University of Adelaide. In 1993 he graduated with a Bachelor of Arts degree. While still at university he joined the Australian Labor Party.

Finnigan began working for the South Australian branch of the Shop, Distributive and Allied Employees Association (SDA) in 1995 as a union official, before becoming the same union's assistant secretary in 2000. This latter position was one he held for five years. There, he was a protégé of future Senator Don Farrell.

== Parliament ==
On 2 May 2006, Finnigan was appointed to the South Australian Legislative Council (upper house) as Labor's candidate to fill the remainder of the term left vacant by the death of former minister Terry Roberts. Finnigan described his own policy interests as including "economic development, industrial relations, federal-state relations, family issues and building social capital". Having participated in a number of parliamentary committees, he served as Parliamentary Secretary to Premier Mike Rann from April 2010 until he was appointed as a minister. He was third on Labor's upper house ticket at the 2010 election and was subsequently re-elected with an eight-year term, set to expire in 2018.

A Catholic, Finnigan was a member of Labor's right-wing (Labor Unity) faction. In his maiden speech on 8 May 2006 Finnigan told the Parliament that "I am a servant of Christ and subject of His reign in history". During June 2008 on a conscience vote, he was among a number of Labor MLCs who joined Liberal and Family First MLCs to vote down an amendment to give same-sex couples legal access to gestational surrogacy. Finnigan opposed the legalisation of euthanasia. In 2009 he was described as "one of the most influential figures in Parliament" and a likely backbench candidate for the ministry, after the promotion of Tom Koutsantonis.

Promoted to the Rann cabinet on 8 February 2011, Finnigan was appointed to several ministerial portfolios simultaneously: Industrial Relations, State/Local Government Relations, and Gambling. As well as those, he became Labor leader in the Legislative Council, and served as acting police minister while Kevin Foley, the serving police minister, was overseas.

== Criminal charges ==
Finnigan resigned as a minister and as a member of the South Australian Executive Council on 21 April 2011. The night before his party resignation, Finnigan was arrested and charged with four child pornography offences. Rann requested that Finnigan be suspended from the party while his case was before the courts, with the suspension endorsed by the party's state executive on 3 May 2011. As the alleged offences were considered a sex crime, South Australian law prohibited publication of his name in connection with the charges until he had entered a plea. He was committed for trial pleading not guilty.

The four charges he originally faced were dropped in favour for seven counts of obtaining access to child pornography and five for possession, some counts of which were aggravated by the alleged age of the children depicted. On 29 June 2012, Finnigan was charged with 14 additional counts of obtaining access to child pornography, seven of them aggravated to be heard in the District Court of South Australia before a jury.

On 24 September 2012, Finnigan was committed to stand trial on five aggravated counts of taking steps to obtain child pornography and one aggravated count of obtaining child pornography, at which point the statutory suppression on naming the accused within South Australia expired. Eight other charges were dropped. Five of the six charges of taking steps to obtain access to child pornography were dismissed by the magistrate handling the case on 13 May 2013. In June 2013 prosecutors refiled previously dismissed charges against Finnigan.

=== Outcome ===
Though a total of 30 various charges were investigated over time, only two charges ended up proceeding to trial. On 10 November 2015, Finnigan was found not guilty of one count of attempting to access child pornography, however he was found guilty of one count of accessing child pornography. Finnigan announced his immediate parliamentary resignation on 12 November, avoiding a potential future disqualification from sitting in parliament due to a conviction. During sentencing submissions, Finnigan's lawyer urged the court not to record a conviction and argued that Finnigan was being vilified, abused, and threatened with violence and death on a daily basis, and lived in constant fear of retaliation up to and including vigilante acts, and was concerned about a future inability to be an employed functioning member of society. It was also argued that the offence was "at the lowest end of the scale". On 9 December, Finnigan had a conviction recorded, was added to the sex offender register, and was given a 15-month suspended sentence with a three-year $1,000 good behaviour bond.

Peter Malinauskas filled the upper house casual vacancy in a joint sitting of the Parliament of South Australia on 1 December. Premier Jay Weatherill spoke during the joint sitting, stating in particular: "We in the Labor Party must accept responsibility for the fact that it was one of our own who diminished the standing of the South Australian Parliament through his behaviour".

Parliament of South Australia
Preceded by Terry Roberts; Vacancy	Member of the South Australian Legislative Council; 2006–2015; Served alongside: Multiple Members	Succeeded by Peter Malinauskas
Political offices
Preceded by Gail Gago	Minister for Industrial Relations; 2011	Succeeded by Patrick Conlon
Preceded by Gail Gago	Minister for State / Local Government Relations; 2011	Succeeded by Patrick Conlon
Preceded by Tom Koutsantonis	Minister for Gambling; 2011	Succeeded by Gail Gago
