= Mario Feleppa =

Australian politician

Mario Severino Feleppa is a former Australian politician. He was a Labor member of the South Australian Legislative Council from 1982 to his resignation in 1995. He was awarded the Medal of the Order of Australia in June 1980.
