= Diana Laidlaw =

Australian politician

Di Laidlaw
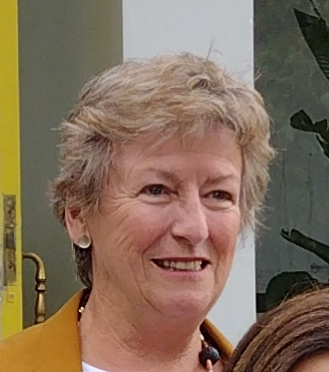

Member of the Legislative Council of South Australia
- In office 6 November 1982 – 6 June 2003

Personal details
- Born: 2 September 1951 (age 75) London, England
- Party: Liberal Party of Australia (SA)

Diana Vivienne Laidlaw AM (born 2 September 1951), commonly referred to as Di Laidlaw, is an Australian former Liberal politician. She was a member of the South Australian Legislative Council (1982–2003) and held several ministerial posts.

== Early life ==
Laidlaw was born in London, the daughter of Don Laidlaw and Vivienne Laidlaw (née Perry), both law graduates of the University of Adelaide. Her grandfather was the founder of Perry Engineering.

== Political career ==
Her early political career was as an assistant to state and federal politicians before being elected to the Legislative Council in 1982.

She entered cabinet in 1993 when the Brown government (1993–1996) came to power in the 1993 election, where she remained under the subsequent Olsen (1996–2001) and Kerin (2001–2002) governments, after which the Liberals lost power with the election of the Rann government.

Laidlaw variously served as the Minister for Transport (1995–1997), the Minister for Transport and Urban Planning (1997–2002), the Minister for the Arts (1993–2002), and the Minister for the Status of Women (1993–2002).

As Minister for the Arts, she presided over the establishment of several new arts organisations, including the Windmill Performing Arts for Children, the Adelaide Cabaret Festival, the Adelaide Festival of Ideas, and the very successful 1998 production of Wagner's Ring Cycle. She also promoted and advocated for Music Business and Music House, the Adelaide Symphony Orchestra, Country Arts SA and the Adelaide Fringe Festival. It was Laidlaw who succeeded in obtaining funding for redevelopment of the North Terrace precinct, the riverbank development and the West End and Hindley Street precincts. She also presided over the expansion of the Art Gallery, the State Library, Festival Centre and Museum, and significantly boosted the South Australian Film Corporation.

In 2001, while Minister for the status of Women, she saw her government's prostitution reform bill defeated in the Legislative Council. She is said to have been moved to tears, and called her colleagues "gutless".

== Honours and awards ==
In 2003, Laidlaw was awarded an honorary doctorate by Flinders University, for "her commitment to creating a supportive climate for the visual and performing arts in the state".
