= Terry Stephens =

Australian politician

The Honourable Terry Stephens
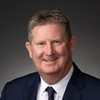

21st and 23rd President of the South Australian Legislative Council
- In office 3 May 2022 – 20 March 2026
- Preceded by: John Dawkins
- Succeeded by: Reggie Martin
- In office 5 February 2020 – 8 September 2020
- Preceded by: Andrew McLachlan
- Succeeded by: John Dawkins

Member of the Legislative Council
- In office 9 February 2002 – 20 March 2026

Personal details
- Born: 11 June 1959 (age 67) Whyalla, South Australia
- Party: Liberal Party of Australia (SA)
- Spouse: Donna
- Children: Courtney and Riley

Terence John Stephens (born 11 June 1959) is an Australian politician, and a former member of the South Australian Legislative Council who represented the South Australian Division of the Liberal Party of Australia from 2002 to 2026. He was twice President of the South Australian Legislative Council with this second term ending with his retirement at the 2026 Election.

== Background ==
Prior to his entry in to politics, Stephens was a company director for 20 years, and was involved in community activities, being a life member of South Whyalla Football Club, life member of the Whyalla Football League, patron of Norwood District Basketball Club, a City of Whyalla Councillor, a member of the Whyalla Chamber of Commerce, and chair of the Westlands Traders Association.

== Parliamentary service ==
Because the Liberals lost the 2002 state election to the Labor Party, and Labor retained government at subsequent elections, Stephens was a member of the opposition until the 2018 South Australian state election was won by the Liberals. He held the role of Shadow Parliamentary Secretary assisting with Industry and Trade, Economic Development and Police from April 2006 to April 2007, was the Shadow Parliamentary Secretary to the Liberal Leader for Business Regulation and Red Tape, and Sport, Recreation & Racing to September 2008, then Shadow Parliamentary Secretary to the Leader for Sport, Recreation and Racing, Small Business, and Red Tape Reduction until July 2009. In July 2009, he was promoted to Shadow Minister for Sport, Recreation and Racing, and Shadow Minister for Tourism, and added Shadow Minister for Corrections, Shadow Minister for Aboriginal Affairs and Shadow Minister for Gambling in April 2010. However, he moved to the backbench in a reshuffle in December 2011.

Stephens became Shadow Parliamentary Secretary for Recreation & Sport, Racing, Aboriginal Affairs and Reconciliation in April 2014.

When the Liberal Party won the 2018 election, Stephens was appointed as Government Whip in the Legislative Council. In February 2020, he replaced Andrew McLachlan as President of the South Australian Legislative Council. Stephens retired from the South Australian Parliament Legislative Council, after serving 24 years, when his third 8 year term expired on 20 March 2026.

Following his retirement from parliament at the 2026 State Election, Stephens was granted the title The Honourable for life by the Governor.

Parliament of South Australia
Preceded by Andrew McLachlan	President of the South Australian Legislative Council; 2020	Succeeded by John Dawkins
Preceded by John Dawkins	President of the South Australian Legislative Council; 2022–present	Incumbent
