= Julian Stefani =

Australian politician

Julian Ferdinand Stefani AM (born 1939) is a former Australian politician.

Before entering politics, he was a managing director. In 1988 he was elected to the South Australian Legislative Council as a Liberal member. He held his seat until his retirement in 2006.

He was made a Member of the Order of Australia in 2017.
