= No Pokies =

Political party in South Australia

Independent No Pokies
- Abbreviation: No Pokies
- Leader: Nick Xenophon
- Founded: 1997
- Dissolved: 2014
- Succeeded by: Nick Xenophon Team
- South Australian Legislative Council: 2 / 22 (2006–2013)

Independent No Pokies, also known as No Pokies or Independent Nick Xenophon's No Pokies Campaign, was an independent South Australian Legislative Council ticket that ran upper house candidates at the 1997, 2002 and 2006 state elections. Poker machines or "pokies" are the Australian version of slot machines. It was replaced by the Nick Xenophon Team in 2014.

== Federal politics ==
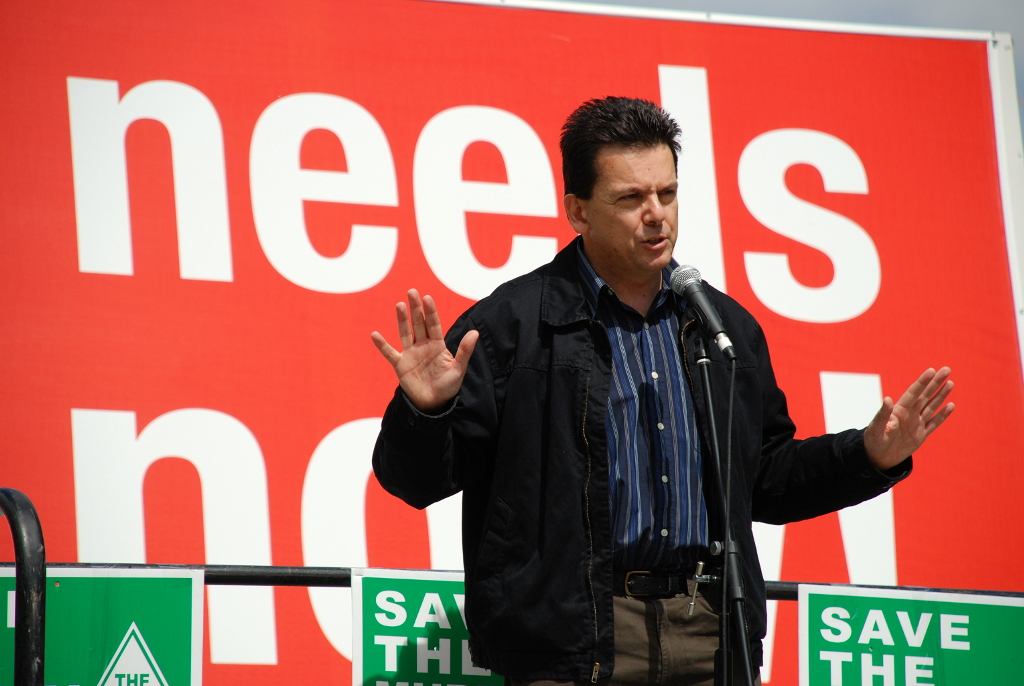
Nick Xenophon in September 2008.

Xenophon resigned from the South Australian Legislative Council in early October 2007 to stand for the Australian Senate as an independent at the 2007 federal election in which he was successful, on a primary vote of 14.78 percent. ABC election analyst Antony Green had stated prior to the election that Xenophon would win a seat, while Centrebet speculated his odds would start on a favourable $1.50 for and $2.70 against. Nick Minchin "urged people not to vote for Mr Xenophon", with the Liberal Party's 2006 upper house vote only 5.5 percent higher, and polled lower than Xenophon in some booths.

Xenophon's federal platform consists of anti-gambling, pro-consumer protection, attention to the water crisis, ratifying the Kyoto Protocol, opposition against what he calls a decrease in state rights, and opposition to WorkChoices. Xenophon shared the balance of power with the Greens and Family First during the 2008–11 Senate parliamentary session, with the Greens holding the sole balance of power since July 2011. Xenophon has been reported in the media as "left-of-centre", whilst Hansard reveals that Xenophon and the Greens have found common ground on a number of issues.

Another ticket known as 'Independent No Pokies' contested the 2002 South Australian state election. It was led by Tanya Flesfader.

== Parliamentarians ==
=== Federal ===
- Senator Nick Xenophon (SA), 2008–2017 (elected in 2007, joined Nick Xenophon Team in 2013)

=== State ===
- John Darley MLC, 2007–2022 (joined Nick Xenophon Team in 2014, joined Advance SA in 2017)
- Ann Bressington MLC, 2006–2014 (left bloc in 2013)
- Nick Xenophon MLC, 1997–2007
