= Stephen Wade (politician) =

Australian politician (born 1960)

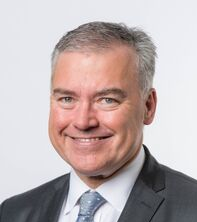

Minister for Health and Wellbeing
- In office 22 March 2018 – 24 March 2022
- Premier: Steven Marshall
- Preceded by: Peter Malinauskas (as Minister for Health and as Minister for Mental Health)
- Succeeded by: Chris Picton

Member of the Legislative Council
- In office 2 May 2006 – 27 January 2023

Personal details
- Born: Stephen Graham Wade; 28 March 1960 (age 66)
- Party: Liberal Party of Australia (SA)
- Education: Pembroke School, Adelaide

Stephen Graham Wade (born 28 March 1960) is a former Australian politician. He was a member of the South Australian Legislative Council serving between May 2006 and January 2023, representing the South Australian Division of the Liberal Party of Australia. Wade has served as the Minister for Health and Wellbeing in the Marshall Ministry between 22 March 2018 and 24 March 2022.

== Background and early career ==
Wade was born in Victoria, he moved to Adelaide with his family in 1974. He attended Pembroke School, before studying a Bachelor of Law and Economics at the University of Adelaide. Wade worked as a Parliamentary Advisor at a state and federal level, including to former Minister for Health Dr Michael Armitage. He then worked in Corporate Governance and served on a number of boards, including as Chair of the Julia Farr Services Inc, and was a fellow of the Australian Institute of Corporate Affairs.

== Political career ==
Wade nominated for the Liberal Party's Legislative Council ticket for the 2006 state election with the support of the party's moderate faction. It had been predicted that as a moderate he would only receive the distinctly unwinnable seventh position, but in an upset result, he instead took the theoretically winnable fifth position. However, the party suffered a particularly bad defeat at the election, and the party was only able to win three seats.

Wade received a second chance soon after the election, however, when the Liberal Party opened nominations for a casual vacancy that had occurred prior to the election when former shadow minister Angus Redford resigned in order to make an unsuccessful bid to shift to the House of Assembly to contest the electoral district of Bright after Wayne Matthew resigned prior to the 2006 election. He emerged as the leading moderate contender for the position, challenging conservative Tim Keynes, who had occupied the fourth position on the ticket at the election and Joe Scalzi, a defeated Member of the House of Assembly. Keynes was widely seen as the favourite, particularly after the victory of conservative Cory Bernardi in a vote to fill a Senate vacancy in March, but in an upset result, Wade won 112–84–32 respectively in the first round of balloting, and 134–96 in the second. He was subsequently appointed to the vacancy on 2 May, the first sitting day of the new parliament, and served out the remaining four years of Redford's term. On 18 April 2007, within a year of the election, Wade was appointed to the Shadow Ministry. Following a reshuffle in July 2009, Wade served as Shadow Minister for Disability Services, Housing, Families and Communities, Social Inclusion and Assisting the Shadow Attorney-General. Wade was elected from second position on the Liberal ticket at the 2010 state election.

After the unexpected result of the 2014 Election, Wade was retained in the Shadow Cabinet with the Shadow Portfolios of Justice, Health, Mental Health and Substance Abuse, Ageing and Suicide Prevention. In a shadow cabinet reshuffle prior to the 2018 Election, Wade was named Shadow Minister for Health and Wellbeing. The Health and Wellbeing Shadow Portfolio combined the previous shadow portfolios of Health, Mental Health and Substance Abuse, Aging and Suicide Prevention.

At the 2018 Election, Wade was elected 2nd on the Liberal Party’s ticket and became the first Minister for the newly created Health and Wellbeing Portfolio. In March 2020, with the declaration of a major emergency, Wade became a central figure in South Australia’s response to COVID-19. With the election of the Malinauskas Government, Wade returned to backbench and now sits on several parliamentary committees. Wade currently sits on the Budget and Finance Committee, COVID-19 oversight committee and the Health Services Committee.

Wade has announced that he intends to retire from the Legislative Council before the end of his term.

Political offices
Preceded by Peter Malinauskas as Minister for Health and as Minister for Mental Health)	Minister for Health and Wellbeing; 2018–2022	Succeeded by Chris Picton
