= Terry Roberts (politician) =

Australian politician (1946–2006)

Minister for Aboriginal Affairs and Reconciliation

Minister for Correctional Services

Member of the South Australian Legislative Council
- In office 7 December 1985 – 18 February 2006
- Succeeded by: Bernard Finnigan

Personal details
- Born: Terance Gerald Roberts; 28 January 1946 Millicent, South Australia
- Died: 18 February 2006 (aged 60)
- Party: Labor (SA)

Terance Gerald "Terry" Roberts (28 January 1946 – 18 February 2006) was a member of the South Australian Legislative Council between 1985 and 2006. At the time of his death, he was a Minister for Aboriginal Affairs and Reconciliation and Correctional Services in the South Australian government.

== Early life and education ==
Roberts was born on 28 January 1946 and educated at Millicent High School in Millicent, South Australia at Mount Gambier, and later Sydney Tech.

He qualified as a metalworker.

== Career ==
Roberts worked for the Construction, Forestry, Mining and Energy Union (CFMEU) in the 1970s and early 1980s, and was a member of the Australian Labor Party for most of his life.

He was elected to the Legislative Council in 1985 and served as a backbencher until 1993. After Labor went into Opposition, he was appointed as a Shadow Minister for Aboriginal Affairs and Correctional Services.

Roberts was appointed to the Cabinet after the election of the Rann Government. As the Minister for Aboriginal Affairs, he added more sacred sites to the Aboriginal Heritage Register than any other minister.

He was a member of many committees over his term in parliament, including the Aboriginal Lands Parliamentary Standing Committee from 22 October 2003 to 18 February 2006. In 2004 Roberts led an inquiry by this committee which examined the shortcomings of the Anangu Pitjantjatjara Yankunytjatjara Land Rights Act 1981 with regard to the governance and social conditions in the Anangu Pitjantjatjara Yankunytjatjara (APY Lands). The review noted shortcomings in the delivery of human services and infrastructure, and made 15 recommendations to improve conditions in and governance of the Lands.

He was committed to social justice and reconciliation over the course of his career.

== Later life and death ==
Roberts was diagnosed as having pancreatic cancer in 2005 while surgery was being done on a bile duct obstruction. He took extended sick leave to undertake chemotherapy and radiation therapy before returning to work in the middle of 2005.

He died on 18 February 2006.

The vacancy created in the upper house was filled in May 2006 by Bernard Finnigan.
