= John Dawkins (South Australian politician) =

Australian politician (born 1954)

The Honourable John Dawkins

President of the South Australian Legislative Council
- In office 8 September 2020 – 19 March 2022

Member of the South Australian Legislative Council
- In office 11 October 1997 – 19 March 2022

Personal details
- Born: 3 July 1954 (age 72) Gawler
- Party: Liberal Party of Australia (SA) (1997–2020, 2022-present)
- Relations: Boyd Dawkins (father) John Dawkins (cousin)
- Education: Prince Alfred College
- Occupation: South Australian Politician

John Samuel Letts Dawkins (born 3 July 1954) is a South Australian politician. He was a member of the South Australian Legislative Council from 1997 until 2022. He served as President of the Legislative Council from September 2020 to March 2022.

He was first elected to an eight-year term in the Legislative Council at the 1997 election. He was re-elected for a second eight-year term at the 2006 election, and a third eight-year term at the 2014 election.

Dawkins represented the Liberal Party until September 2020, after he nominated for the Legislative Council President vacancy. Although Dawkins was ultimately elected President, he was also temporarily suspended from the Liberal Party for standing against the party's endorsed candidate. Upon his retirement, he resumed his Liberal Party membership.

== Family ==
John Dawkins was born in Gawler, South Australia, which in the 1950s was a country town 40 km north of South Australia's capital Adelaide. His family owned a sheep breeding farm at Gawler River and Dawkins spent much of his childhood assisting on the property.

Dawkins was the son of the Hon. Maynard Boyd Dawkins MBE (1917–96), a sheep breeder and former member of Local Government and Member of the South Australian Legislative Council for the Liberal Party from 1962 to 1982. The family's WA-based cousin, John Sydney Dawkins, was also a politician, most notably serving as Federal Treasurer of Australia (1991-1993).

== Education and early work life ==
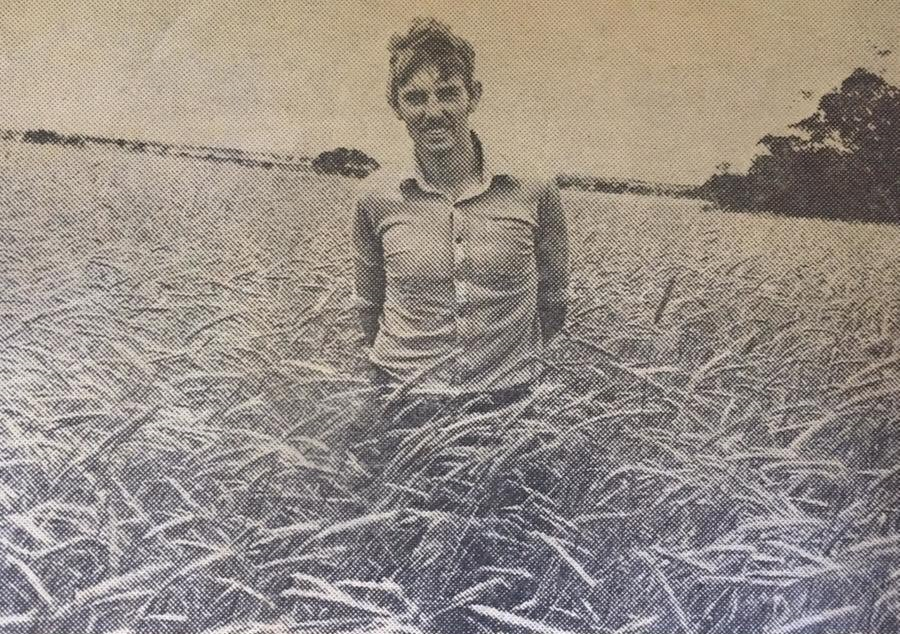
John Dawkins in a cereal rye crop on his family's Gawler River farm in 1978.

Dawkins attended the local Gawler River Primary School and then spent his secondary years at Prince Alfred College and Gawler High School. After attending Roseworthy Agricultural College in 1972, Dawkins transferred to Glenormiston Agricultural College in Victoria, where he obtained an Associate Diploma in Farm Management. Dawkins later earned a Diploma in Freelance Journalism at Adelaide TAFE. This qualification complemented his long-held role as a part-time journalist, primarily for The Bunyip newspaper at Gawler, where he wrote weekly football reports and also contributed local news, mostly focused on Adelaide Plains communities.

Before entering parliament, Dawkins continued to work as a primary producer at Gawler River, while also becoming increasingly involved in politics. In the years prior to entering parliament, he worked for Federal Liberal representatives Neil Andrew, Alexander Downer and Nick Minchin. Dawkins has always remained close to his roots, including in continuing to be a strong supporter of the Two Wells Roosters, for whom he played over 200 games of football as a younger man (and of which he is Patron and Life Member).

== Political career ==
John Dawkins was first elected to the Legislative Council in 1997 and served three full eight-year terms, being re-elected in 2006 and again in 2014. John Dawkins served as the Opposition Whip in the Legislative Council from 2002 to 2018 and he was later the President of the Legislative Council.

The Liberal Party South Australian State election (Legislative Council): results the year of John Dawkins election
| year | votes | percentage (%) | swing (%) | seats won | seats held |
|---|---|---|---|---|---|
| 1997 | 339,064 | 37.82 | -13.99 | 4 | 10 |
| 2006 | 241,740 | 26.0 | -14.1 | 3 | 8 |
| 2014 | 363,809 | 36.0 | -3.4 | 4 | 8 |

Committee roles

Dawkins played an active role in many parliamentary positions over the last twenty years and his main committee roles include:

- Chairman of Rural Communities Reference Group, 1998-2002
- Convenor of Regional Development Council, 1999-2002
- Chairman, Regional Development Issues Group 1999-2002
- Member of Environment, Resources and Development Committee 1997-2002
- Member, Statutory Authorities Review Committee 1997-2002
- Secretary, Parliamentary Christian Fellowship 1998-2000
- Chairman, Parliamentary Christian Fellowship 2000-2003
- Opposition Whip 2002
- Member of Joint Parliamentary Service Committee 2003

During his time in politics, he was most well-known for his work on suicide prevention and surrogacy.

== Suicide Prevention ==
Suicide is the leading cause of death for South Australians between the age of 15 and 44. Within the indigenous community this rate is more than doubled. In 2019 the ABS released statistics that showed a reduction in the suicide rate for South Australia, down from 12.8% to 12% in one year (2017-2018). This statistic marks a 6.8 percent decrease and places South Australia below the national average.

John Dawkins was announced as the Premier's Advocate for Suicide Prevention in 2018. He was also a key member of the Premier's Council on Suicide Prevention, a body that consists of thirteen advocates that meet and discuss how South Australia can minimise the impact of suicide.

In this role, Dawkins helped develop the first South Australian Suicide Prevention Plan (2017-2021) and subsequent editions. These plans identify initiatives the SA Government will promote to reduce suicide, prioritising the establishment of suicide prevention networks (SPN). An SPN builds a community of volunteers that aim to reduce the harm of suicide in their respective communities. This includes cross sector collaboration between local health and primary health networks, workplace peer support, prevention and postvention initiatives. The most notable initiative discussed in the original plan was the South Australian Suicide Registry, designed to become a source of trend identification to help intervention.

One of Dawkins' achievements was the signing of the national communications charter. Launched in 2018, this charter is a set of guiding principles that assists how professionals talk about and react to issues relating to mental health. Additionally, John Dawkins was a major part in the drafting of the Suicide prevention Bill 2020. This bill aimed to create legislative mechanisms that would reduce the impact of suicide.

== Surrogacy ==
Dawkins has been a long-term advocate for surrogacy, having publicly stated that his support for reform stems from his own lived experience as a young father and also his contemporary experiences working on behalf of constituent families seeking avenues to parenthood.

Prior to 2014, surrogacy in South Australia was regulated by Part 2B of the Family Relationships Act 1975 (SA). This act prohibited commercial surrogacy and set out the criteria for legal altruistic surrogates.

The Family Relationships (Surrogacy) Amendment Bill 2014 was introduced as a private member's bill by Dawkins himself. It was in response to two things. The first was that after 2010 it was illegal for the biological mother to receive reimbursement for the act of surrogacy. The second factor in this amendment was in response to what was called the baby gammy incident and questions about the viability of altruistic surrogacy. The key goal of this act was to try to make surrogacy easier, to limit overseas use of the commercial surrogacy process, and to ensure that commercial surrogacy remained illegal.

Dawkins' proposed reforms that would make it legal for suitable reimbursement and billable costs to be given to the surrogate mother. He believed that this reform would increase the availability and willingness of surrogates. The reforms also introduced a Surrogate Register (s 10FB). This allowed the Attorney-General to establish a register of South Australian women who had agreed to (and would in the future agree to) a surrogacy agreement. This would not be public knowledge, but could be accessed by medical professionals or relevant service providers.

Later, Dawkins helped introduce the Surrogacy Bill 2019, which upon passage constituted the first time that South Australia had stand-alone surrogacy laws. The proposed reforms included raising the age of surrogacy from 18 years to 25 years or older, providing more express provisions regarding compensation for surrogacy and extending eligibility to single parents for the first time.

Previously in South Australia, surrogacy was only accessible to those who were legally married or in registered relationships of over three years. This Bill was a response to recommendations by the South Australian Law Reform Institute and extensive consultation with the community. Vickie Chapman, Deputy Premier of South Australia, personally thanked Dawkins on his work for these reforms, publicly stating: "I would like to extend my gratitude to the Hon John Dawkins MLC, who has worked tirelessly on this issue for over a decade".

== Appointment as South Australian Legislative Council President ==
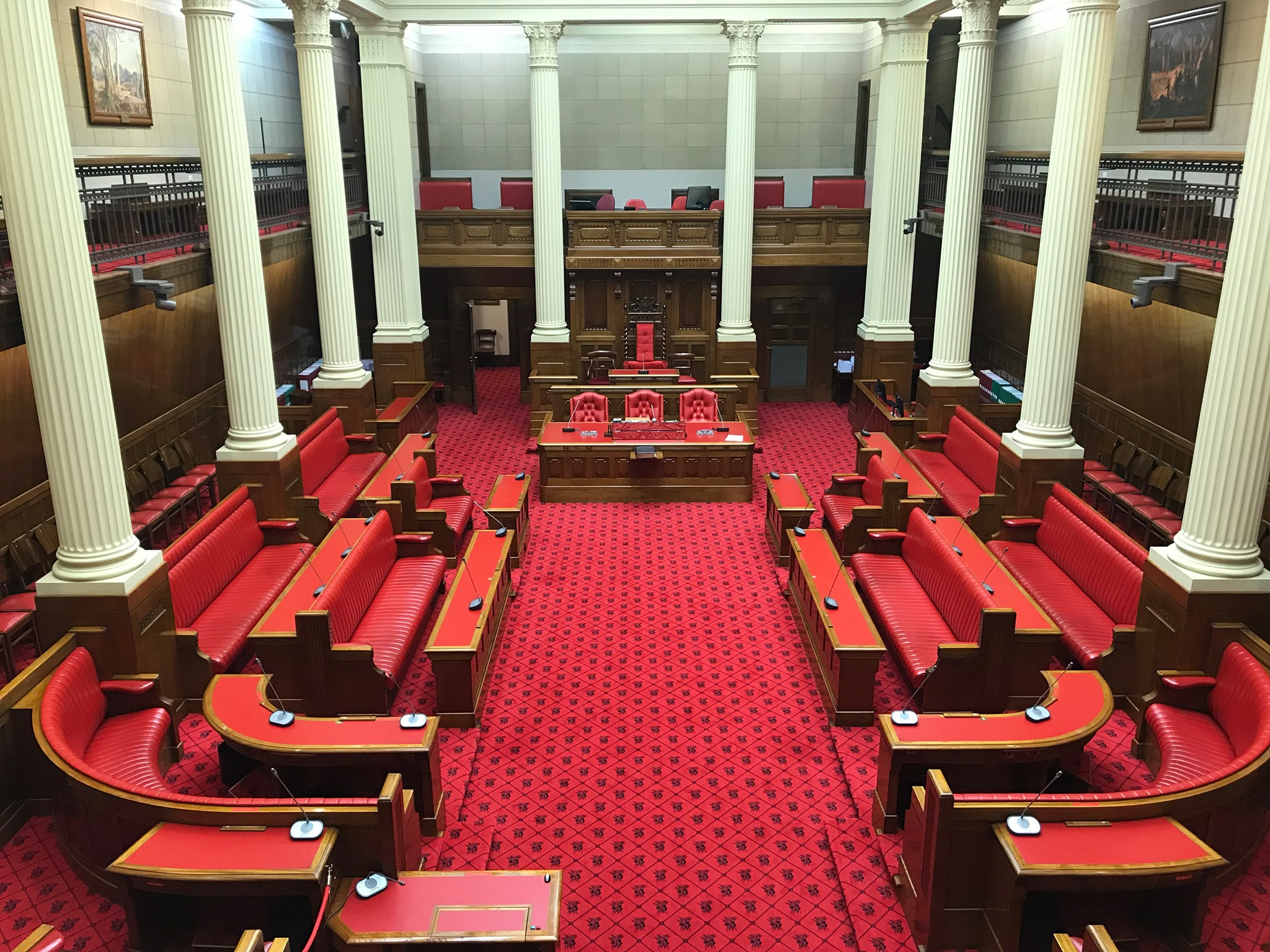
South Australian Legislative Chamber Parliament House, Adelaide, South Australia

The President of the South Australian Legislative Council is a presiding officer, alongside the Speaker of the South Australian House of Assembly. On 26 July 2020, Terry Stephens announced his resignation as Legislative Council President amid the Country Members Accommodation Allowance scandal. In response, John Dawkins confirmed his nomination for the vacancy.

The controversy in John Dawkins announcing his candidacy was that he went against the preferred Liberal candidate Jing Lee, thus running without his party's support. After two secret ballots were tied, the new candidate was decided by "lucky dip". Dawkins was announced as the new President on 8 September 2020, at which time he confirmed he would no longer attend Liberal party room meetings, "as a general Westminster tradition".

Following his election as President, a Liberal party room meeting resolved to commence proceedings to expel Dawkins from the party room. Treasurer at the time, Rob Lucas, said that the subsequent expulsion of Dawkins from the party room was a result of "the inevitable consequences of the white-hot anger there is from a number of his colleagues".

Dawkins, who at the time had been a Liberal Party member for 48 years, said his nomination for President simply "exercised the long-enshrined right of Liberal MPs to act according to their individual principles, even if independent of the party’s position of the day.” He commented that "There have been three other members of the party who have taken the same steps as I have … one is a member of the Liberal Party to this day".

The Liberal Party State Executive determined not to ban Dawkins from the party permanently, after considering his argument for remaining a party member, which included reference to a number of relevant historical precedents. Instead, State Executive confirmed that Dawkins' membership of the Party would be suspended "for the term of his presidency".

He stated that in his retirement he would continue his work in suicide prevention and continue his community involvement via a range of organisations, including the Uniting Church, the Adelaide Plains Football League, the Adelaide Plains Male Voice Choir and SA Country Shows (Dawkins, 2021).

Parliament of South Australia
| Preceded by Terry Stephens | President of the South Australian Legislative Council; 2020–2022 | Succeeded by Terry Stephens |
