= Ian Gilfillan =

Australian politician

Member of the South Australian Legislative Council
- In office 6 November 1982 – 18 November 1993
- In office 11 October 1997 – 17 March 2006

Personal details
- Born: 7 June 1932 (age 93)
- Party: Australian Democrats
- Occupation: Farmer

Ian Gilfillan (born 7 June 1932) is a former Australian politician. He was educated in Adelaide and was based on Kangaroo Island. He contested the 1974 federal election as a member of the Australia Party, but joined the Australian Democrats in 1977. In 1982, he was elected to the South Australian Legislative Council as a Democrat, holding the position until 1993. He returned to the Council in 1997 and served until his retirement in 2006.
