= Results of the 2022 South Australian state election (Legislative Council) =

2022 South Australian state election (Legislative Council)
- 19 March 2022

11 of the 22 seats in the Legislative Council 11 seats needed for a majority
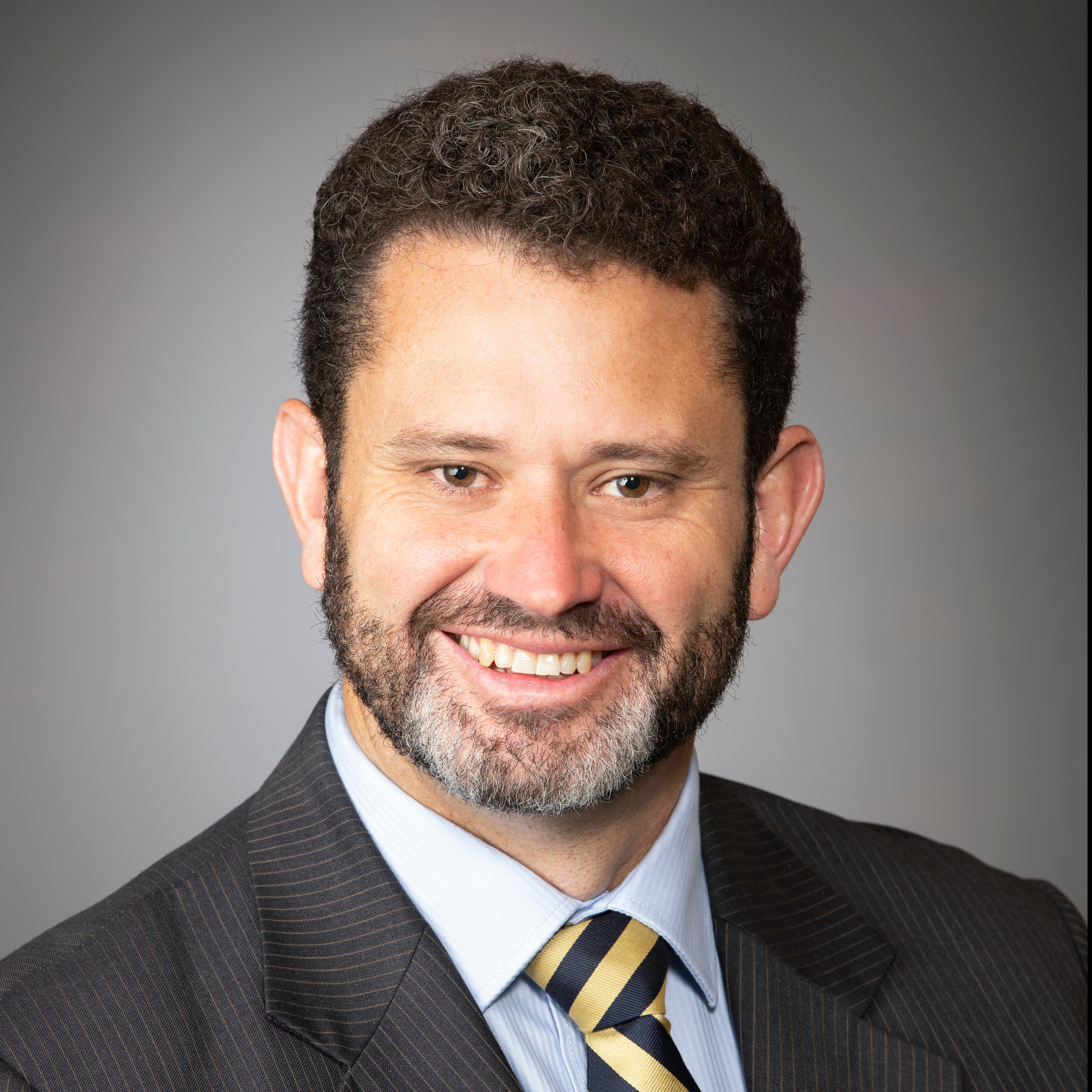

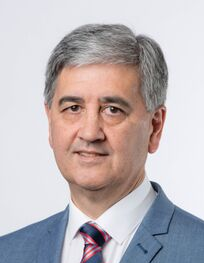

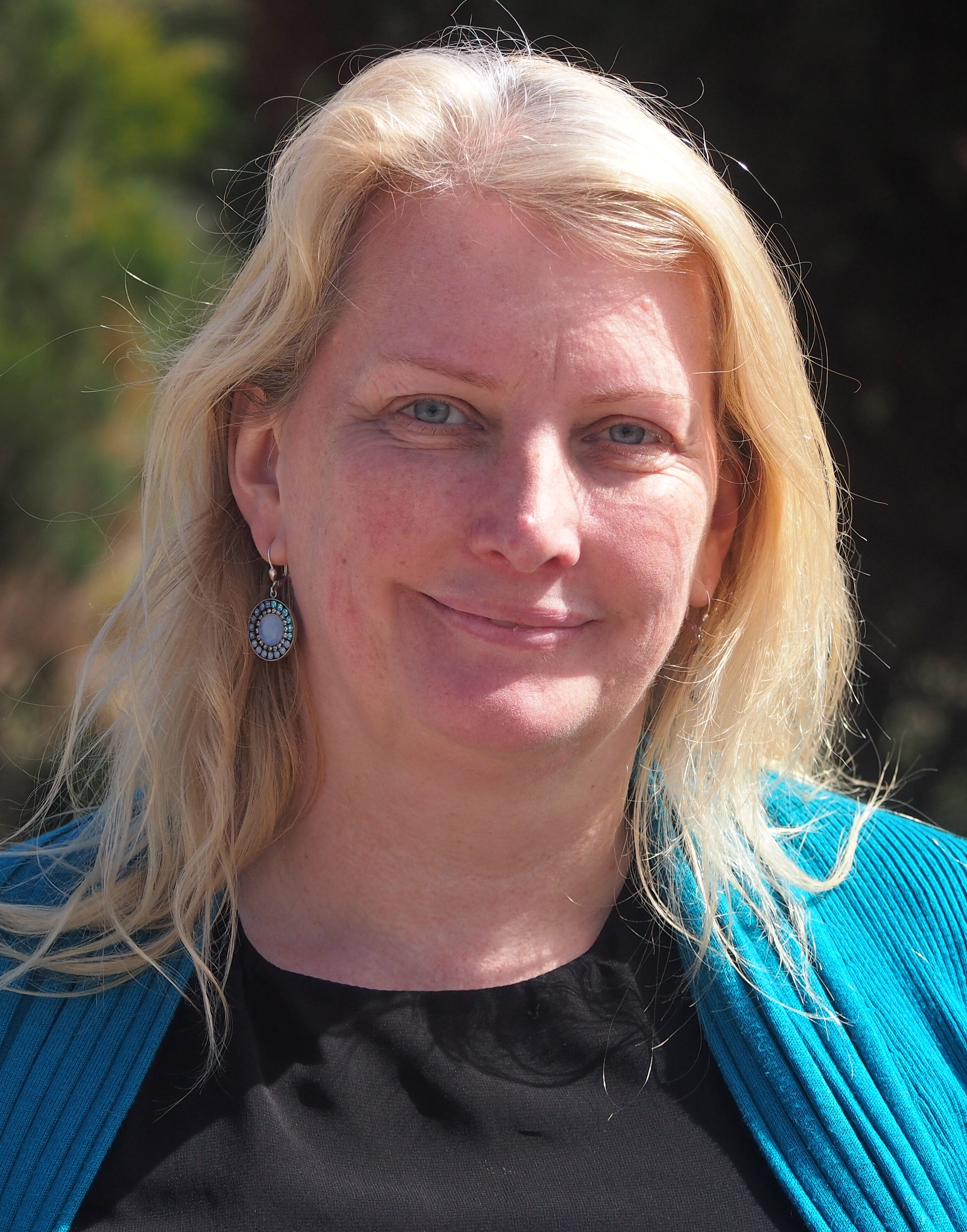

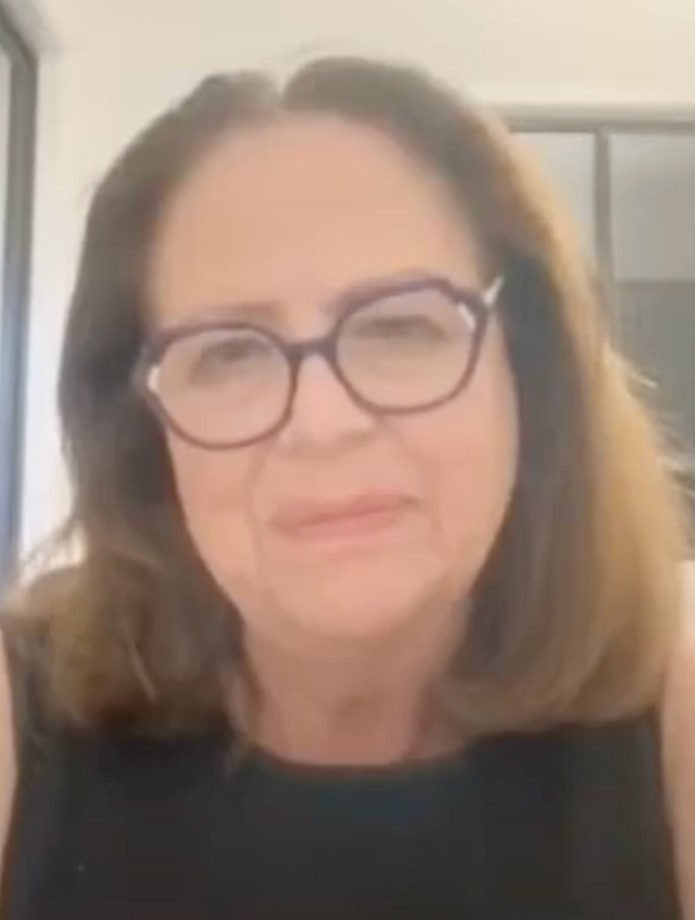

	First party	Second party	Third party
Leader	Kyam Maher	Rob Lucas (retired)	Tammy Franks (not up for election)
Party	Labor	Liberal	Greens
Seats before	8 seats	9 seats	2 seats
Seats won	5	4	1
Seats after	9	8	2
Seat change	▲1	▼1	Steady
Primary vote	402,441	374,289	98,324
Percentage	36.96%	34.38%	9.03%
Swing	▲8.01	▲2.14	▲3.17
	Fourth party	Fifth party	Sixth party
Leader	Jennifer Game (did not contest) (Note: Jennifer Game contested the Electorate of Mawson in the House of Assembly)	No leader	John Darley (lost seat)
Party	One Nation	SA Best	Advance SA
Seats before	0 seats	2 seats	1 seat
Seats won	1	0	0
Seats after	1	2	0
Seat change	▲1	Steady	▼1
Primary vote	46,051	11,392	3,623
Percentage	4.23%	1.05%	0.33%
Swing	▲4.23	▼18.31	▼0.07
Leader of the Government before election
Rob Lucas
Liberal
Subsequent Leader of the Government
Kyam Maher
Labor

This is a list of results for the Legislative Council at the 2022 South Australian state election.

The 11 of 22 seats up for election were 5 Liberal, 4 Labor, 1 Green and 1 Advance SA.

Following the collapse of the SA Best vote, a party formed by Nick Xenophon in 2017, by over 18 percentage to just 1.05% the filling of the first 9 elected members with quotas were 4 Labor, 4 Liberal, 1 Green.

After the distribution of preferences of the remaining valid votes, One Nation and Labor won the final two remaining seats from Family First. The outcome was 5 Labor, 4 Liberal, 1 Green and 1 One Nation.

As a result, Labor had gained one seat and One Nation in their first election in South Australia had replaced Advance SA's John Darley, who was elected in 2014 under the Independent Nick Xenophon Team (formerly No Pokies), and been a member of the South Australian Legislative Council since 2007.

Carrying over members of the Legislative Council from the 2018 election (serving an eight-year term) were 4 Labor, 4 Liberal, 2 SA-BEST, 1 Green.

Rob Lucas after 40 years, Leader of the Government and Liberal Party in the Legislative Council, retired at the end of his term in 2022 having been first elected in 1982.

== Election results ==
2022 South Australian state election: Legislative Council
Party	Candidate	Votes	%	±%
Labor	1. Kyam Maher (elected 1); 2. Tung Ngo (elected 4); 3. Reggie Martin (elected 6); 4. Ian Hunter (elected 8); 5. Russell Wortley (elected 11); 6. Meagan Spencer	402,441	36.96	+8.01
Liberal	1. Michelle Lensink (elected 2); 2. Dennis Hood (elected 5); 3. Nicola Centofanti (elected 7); 4. Laura Curran (elected 9); 5. Kathleen Bourne; 6. Tania Stock	374,289	34.38	+2.14
Greens	1. Robert Simms (elected 3); 2. Yesha Joshi; 3. Malwina Wyra	98,324	9.03	+3.17
One Nation	1. Sarah Game (elected 10); 2. Bob Couch	46,051	4.23	+4.23
Liberal Democrats	1. James Hol; 2. Peter McMahon	36,445	3.35	+0.88
Family First	1. Tom Kenyon; 2. Deepa Mathew; 3. Craig Bowyer	33,342	3.06	+3.06
Legalise Cannabis	1. Damon Adams; 2. Tyler Green	22,731	2.09	+2.09
Animal Justice	1. Louise Pfeiffer; 2. Tracey Newman	16,299	1.50	−0.67
SA Best	1. Ian Markos; 2. Keyvan Abak	11,392	1.05	−18.31
Real Change	1. Stephen Pallaras; 2. Tony Tonkin	9,417	0.86	+0.86
Australian Family	1. Bob Day; 2. Sue Jarman	9,315	0.86	+0.86
National	1. Gary Johanson; 2. Lisa Sherry; 3. Emmalene Richards	7,363	0.68	+0.68
Independent Prioritise Health	1. Kieran Roche; 2. Deborah Davies	4,841	0.68	+0.68
Sustainable Australia	1. Elise Michie; 2. Jack Duxbury	3,871	0.36	+0.36
Advance SA	1. John Darley; 2. Paula Gust; 3. Linda Cheng	3,623	0.33	−0.07
Independent Defend Local Business	1. Colin Shearing; 2. Carol Haslam	3,237	0.30	+0.30
Independent Truth Accountability Responsibility	1. Amrik Singh Thandi; 2. MJ Thandi	2,461	0.23	−0.11
Independent Belinda Valentine Team	1. Belinda Valentine; 2. Steven Harvey	1,508	0.14	+0.14
Independent Annabel Digance Team	1. Annabel Digance; 2. Greg Digance	1,359	0.12	+0.12
Ungrouped	Graham Philp	531	0.05	+0.05
Total formal votes		1,088,840	95.94	+0.33
Informal votes		40,840	3.62	−0.33
Turnout		1,129,680	89.18	−2.94

== See also ==
- Candidates of the 2022 South Australian state election
- Members of the South Australian Legislative Council, 2022–2026
