= Caldicott (disambiguation) =

Caldicott is a historic house in Somerset County, Maryland, United States.

Caldicott may also refer to:

- Caldicott (surname)
- Caldicott School, a prep school for boys in Buckinghamshire, England
- Caldicott Report

== See also ==
- Caldicot (disambiguation)
- Caldecott (disambiguation)
