= Ian Hunter (politician) =

Australian politician (born 1960)

The Honourable Ian Hunter BSc (Hons), MLC
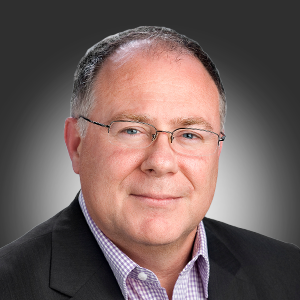

Member of the South Australian Legislative Council
- Incumbent
- Assumed office 18 March 2006

Personal details
- Born: Ian Keith Hunter; 23 September 1960 (age 66)
- Party: Australian Labor Party (SA)
- Spouse: Leith Semmens (m. 2012)
- Education: Flinders University
- Occupation: Medical research assistant Government advisor Labor state secretary

Ian Keith Hunter (born 23 September 1960) is an Australian politician, representing the South Australian Branch of the Australian Labor Party in the South Australian Legislative Council since the 2006 state election. Hunter served in the Cabinet of South Australia from October 2011 to 2018.

== Background ==
Hunter grew up in the suburb of Holden Hill in Adelaide's North-East. He was educated at Gilles Plains High School and graduated from Flinders University with a Bachelor of Science (Honours), majoring in Microbiology and Genetics. Throughout university he worked as a Youth Worker at the Child Youth Support Service in Norwood.

Hunter was active in community politics at university, becoming president of the Flinders University Gay Society and later going on to help found the South Australian AIDS Action Committee. He was involved in a variety of campaigns in the LGBTQ community, including a successful move to have sexuality included as a grounds for discrimination in 1986.

Following his graduation Hunter worked as a research assistant in the Department of Clinical Immunology at the Flinders Medical Centre, later serving as an advisor to the federal government and as Labor South Australian State Secretary.

== Parliament ==
Hunter was elected to the South Australian Legislative Council at the 2006 state election at fourth position on the Labor ticket, and at the 2014 state election he was re-elected at second position on the Labor ticket.

He used his maiden speech to outline his commitment to social justice issues and education as a force for progressive change, and attacked the push for the teaching of Intelligent Design as "fundamentalist dogma dressed up as science". He also reflected on his political life in the Australian Labor Party, recalling his step-father's advice that "Labor stood for the working people and the Liberals stood for the rich", and saying, "in all my years since then I have not seen anything to refute his approach to politics".

Hunter served as chair of the Social Development Committee's inquiry into Bogus, Unregistered and Deregistered Health Practitioners. The Committee produced a report recommending substantial regulation of currently unregistered health practitioners, a public awareness campaign, and strict rules on the display of legitimate health qualifications.

In September 2010 Hunter gave a speech in parliament criticising the practice of homeopathy for failing to meet the standards of peer reviewed scientific research, and called for Nicola Roxon, the Federal Minister for Health, to immediately review all taxpayer funding of homeopathy.

He has been the subject of three separate successful upper house no confidence motions, moved by the Liberal opposition and supported by the crossbench.

Hunter was appointed to the Weatherill Ministry cabinet in October 2011 and served in a range of ministerial portfolios until the 2018 state election including communities and social inclusion, social housing, disabilities, youth, volunteers (2011 to 2013), sustainability, environment and conservation, water and the River Murray and climate change (2013 to 2018), and aboriginal affairs (between 2013 and 2015).

=== LGBT advocacy ===
Hunter is the first openly-LGBTI member in the Parliament of South Australia, as well as Cabinet, as well as the first to marry while in parliament and the second same-sex married politician in Australia, and is noted for his public advocacy for LGBTQ issues, which at times has conflicted with aspects of Labor policy. Hunter and his partner of 20 years, Leith Semmens chose to travel to Spain to marry as Australian law did not recognise same-sex marriage at the time.

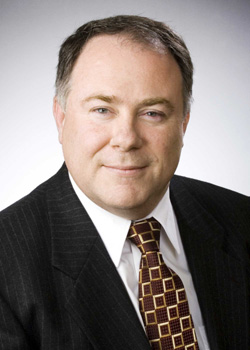
Official 2006 parliamentary photo.

In June 2008 Hunter introduced a number of amendments to the Statutes Amendment (Surrogacy) Bill, including removing the term "marriage-like relationship" in order to remove discrimination against same-sex couples. The amendment would effectively give same-sex couples the legal right to access gestational surrogacy. Following an email campaign by Family First MLCs Andrew Evans and Dennis Hood the proposed amendment was defeated, and the Bill was referred back to the House of Assembly in its original form.

On 16 June 2009 Hunter delivered a speech to parliament calling for same-sex marriage in Australia and criticising Prime Minister Kevin Rudd for supporting the current definition of marriage as "between a man and a woman". His speech gained national media attention, and went on to be included in an anthology of "Great Speeches on Gay Rights".

Hunter co-sponsored the 2011 Marriage Equality Bill with Greens MLC Tammy Franks also supported by the Australian Marriage Equality under its then national convenor Alex Greenwich who became the first same-sex married parliamentarian in Australia and the NSW Legislative Assembly. If passed it would be the first piece of legislation in Australia to grant same-sex couples equal marriage rights. The legislation is based on formal constitutional advice from Professor George Williams that, while Federal marriage law prohibits same-sex marriage, the states may be able to introduce their own legislation without being rendered invalid by Section 109 of the Australian Constitution.

Hunter's second reading speech on the bill once again drew media attention after he labelled the current Labor policy on marriage "morally bankrupt" and "a house of cards that cannot stand long", comparing it with the party's past support for the White Australia Policy.

In February 2011 the South Australian state division of the Liberal Party announced that it would vote against the Marriage Equality Bill in the Legislative Council, declaring a view that marriage was beyond the legislative jurisdiction of the South Australian Parliament and the view that legislation could be struck down by the High Court of Australia. Liberal leader Isobel Redmond later declared her support for marriage equality, following Mike Rann's declaration of support in the final weeks of his Premiership. In May 2011 the multi-party Social Development Committee, which Hunter chairs, delivered the findings of its Inquiry into same-sex parenting to parliament. The recommendations of the committee included the introduction of adoption rights for same-sex couples, access to altruistic gestational surrogacy, legal parenting rights for non-birth mothers borne to gestational surrogates, access to reproductive technology for lesbian and single women, and a public awareness campaign on the rights of same-sex parents.

== Personal life ==
Hunter, 52, married his long-term partner, Leith Semmens, 42, in Jun in the Province of Granada in southern Spain on 19 December 2012. Hunter is an atheist, and contributed a chapter to the 2010 Australian Book of Atheism on the topic of "Parliament and Prayer". This followed media criticism after he referred to the practice of opening parliament with prayer as "archaic" and "a waste of time".
