= Electoral results for the district of Badcoe =

South Australian district election results

This is a list of electoral results for the Electoral district of Badcoe in South Australian state elections from the district's first election in 2018 until the present.

== Members for Badcoe ==
Member	Party	Term
Jayne Stinson	Labor	2018–present

== Election results ==
=== Elections in the 2020s ===
==== 2026 ====
2026 South Australian state election: Badcoe
Party	Candidate	Votes	%	±%
Labor	Jayne Stinson	11,508	49.0	−1.0
One Nation	Daniel Shepherd	4,181	17.8	+14.7
Greens	Josh Andersen-Ward	3,889	16.6	+5.2
Liberal	Amar Singh	3,240	13.8	−15.4
Family First	Radosav Jovanovic	469	2.0	+0.2
Australian Family	Jonathan Attard	183	0.8	−1.3
Total formal votes		23,470	97.4	+1.2
Informal votes		619	2.6	−1.2
Turnout		24,090	88.1	−1.0
Two-candidate-preferred result
Labor	Jayne Stinson	16,700	71.2	+6.4
One Nation	Daniel Shepherd	6,770	28.8	+28.8
Labor hold				

==== 2022 ====
2022 South Australian state election: Badcoe
Party	Candidate	Votes	%	±%
Labor	Jayne Stinson	11,780	50.0	+11.2
Liberal	Jordan Dodd	6,876	29.2	−3.6
Greens	Finn Caulfield	2,697	11.4	+3.9
One Nation	Tristan Iveson	722	3.1	+3.1
Animal Justice	Fiona Eckersley	571	2.4	+2.4
Australian Family	Nicole Hussey	488	2.1	+2.1
Family First	Ken Turner	428	1.8	+1.8
Total formal votes		23,562	96.2	
Informal votes		931	3.8	
Turnout		24,493	89.1	
Two-party-preferred result
Labor	Jayne Stinson	15,263	64.8	+10.1
Liberal	Jordan Dodd	8,299	35.2	−10.1
Labor hold		Swing	+10.1	

Distribution of preferences: Badcoe
Party	Candidate	Votes	Round 1		Round 2		Round 3		Round 4		Round 5	
Party	Candidate	Votes	Dist.	Total	Dist.	Total	Dist.	Total	Dist.	Total	Dist.	Total
Quota (50% + 1)		11,782										
Labor	Jayne Stinson	11,780	+40	11,820	+122	11,942	+260	12,202	+246	12,448	+2,815	15,263
Liberal	Jordan Dodd	6,876	+55	6,931	+71	7,002	+178	7,180	+578	7,758	+541	8,299
Greens	Finn Caulfield	2,697	+38	2,735	+225	2,960	+119	3,079	+277	3,356	Excluded	
One Nation	Tristan Iveson	722	+52	774	+56	830	+271	1,101	Excluded			
Animal Justice	Fiona Eckersley	571	+23	594	Excluded							
Australian Family	Nicole Hussey	488	+220	708	+120	828	Excluded					
Family First	Ken Turner	428	Excluded									

=== Elections in the 2010s ===
==== 2018 ====
2018 South Australian state election: Badcoe
Party	Candidate	Votes	%	±%
Labor	Jayne Stinson	8,286	38.7	−2.8
Liberal	Lachlan Clyne	6,845	32.0	−8.6
SA-Best	Kate Bickford	3,261	15.2	+15.2
Greens	Stef Rozitis	1,680	7.9	−3.9
Conservatives	Robyn Munro	533	2.5	−1.8
Independent	John Woodward	397	1.9	+1.9
Dignity	Lily Durkin	384	1.8	+0.7
Total formal votes		21,386	96.0	−0.7
Informal votes		901	4.0	+0.7
Turnout		22,287	90.5	−1.3
Two-party-preferred result
Labor	Jayne Stinson	11,867	55.5	+1.4
Liberal	Lachlan Clyne	9,519	44.5	−1.4
Labor hold		Swing	+1.4	
