= Melanie Selwood =

Australian politician

The Honourable Melanie Selwood MLC
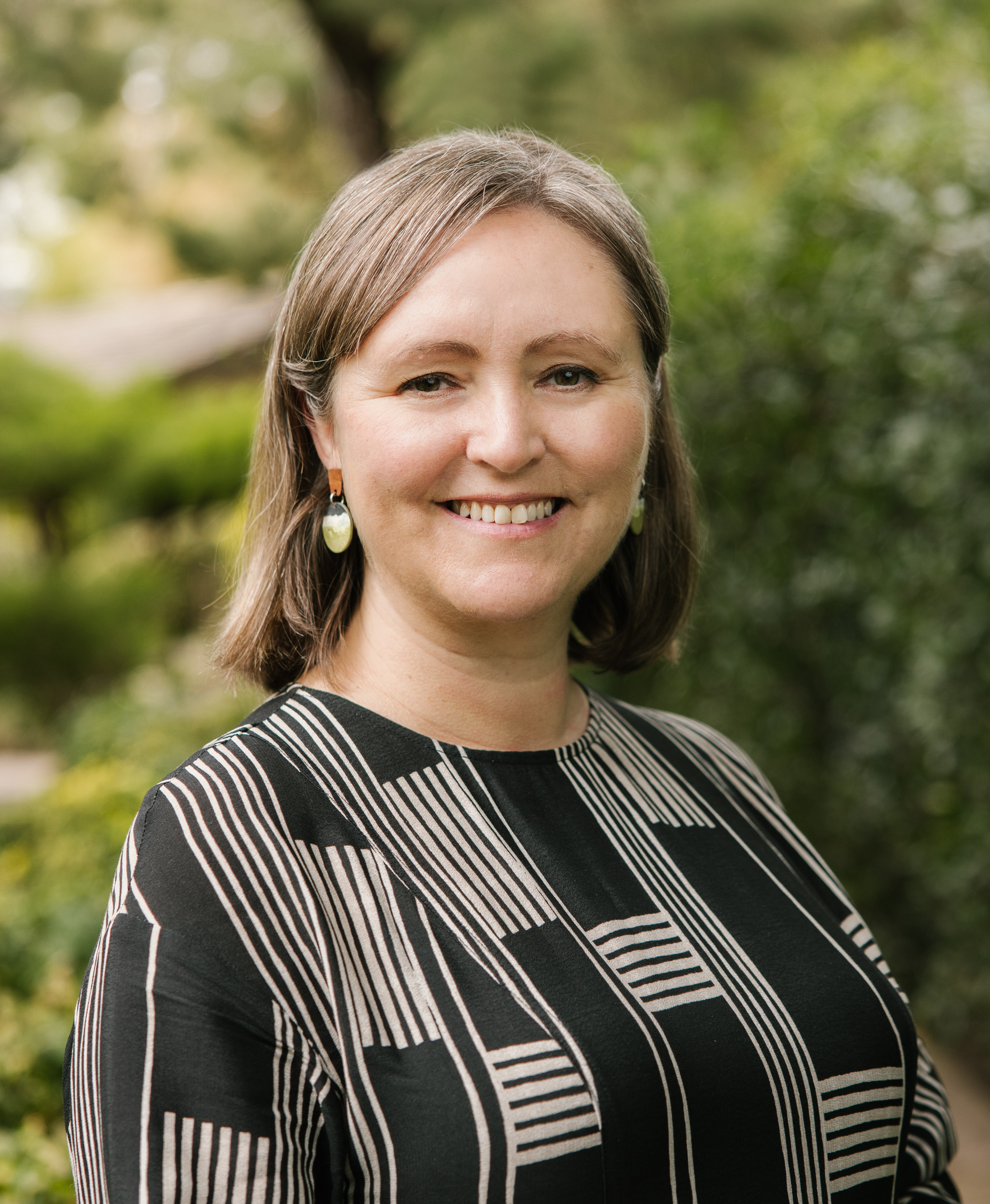

Member of the South Australian Legislative Council
- Incumbent
- Assumed office 21 March 2026

Councillor of Adelaide Hills Council for Valleys Ward
- In office 12 November 2022 – 27 May 2025

Deputy mayor of Adelaide Hills Council
- In office 1 June 2024 – 27 January 2025
- Preceded by: Nathan Daniell
- Succeeded by: Nathan Daniell

Personal details
- Party: Greens

Melanie Selwood is an Australian politician who has sat as a member of the South Australian Legislative Council since the 2026 state election. Selwood is a member of the Greens, and has previously served as chief of staff for Greens MLC Robert Simms and as a councillor for the Adelaide Hills.

== Career ==
Selwood stood in the 2022 state election as a Greens candidate in the district of Kavel, and was elected to the Adelaide Hills Council later that year in the local elections, representing Valleys Ward.

When Tammy Franks, one of two Greens members in the South Australian Legislative Council, announced that she would not seek re-election, Selwood announced she would nominate for the lead position on the Greens' 2026 ticket in the Legislative Council. At the time, Selwood was chief of staff for the other Greens MLC, Robert Simms, and deputy mayor of Adelaide Hills. Selwood won pre-selection for the role in December 2024, defeating Sarah Luscombe, who had stood for the party in the 2024 Black by-election. Selwood resigned from Adelaide Hills Council in May 2025, both to focus on her election campaign and to prevent a lengthier vacancy from being triggered if she vacated the seat at the state election.

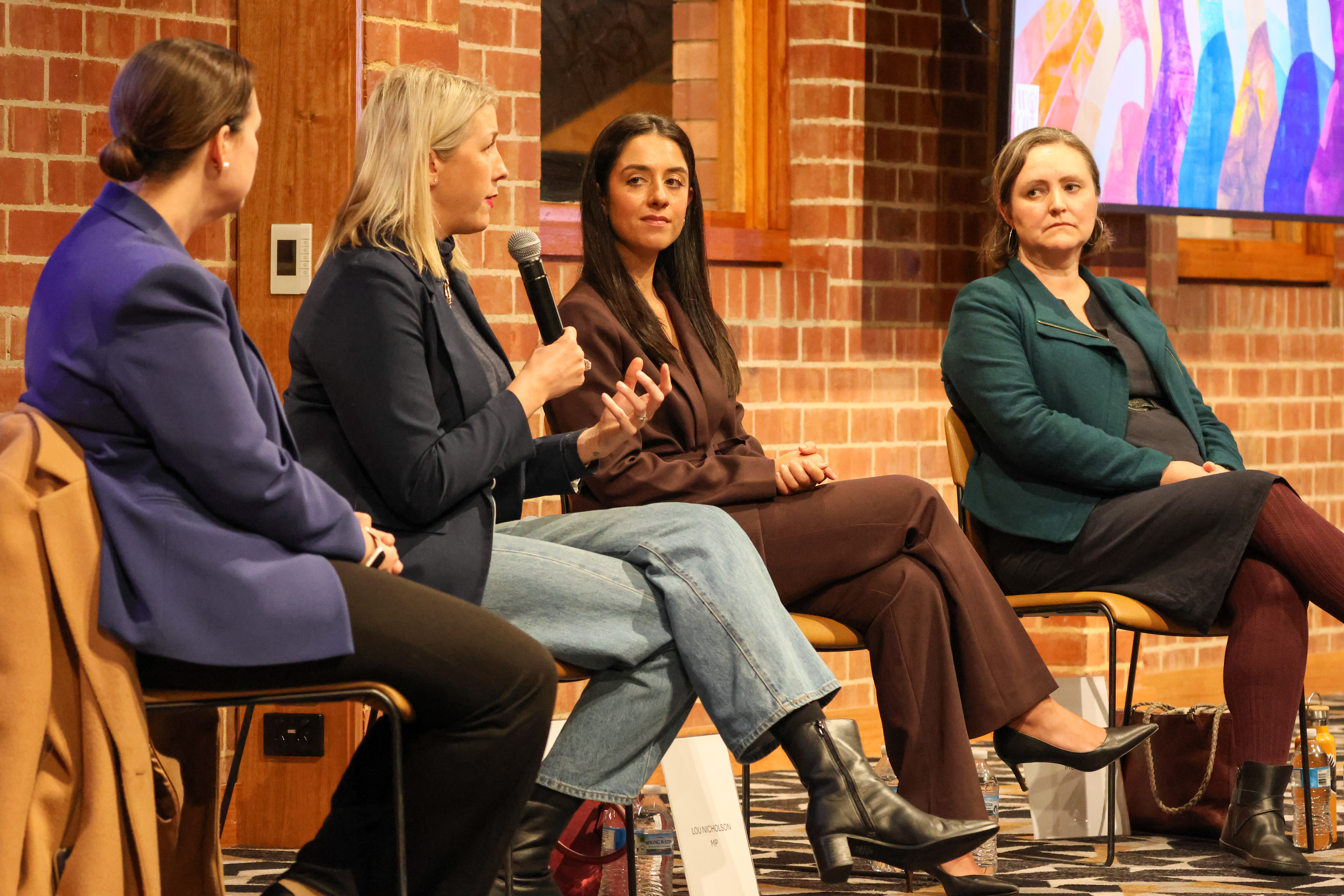
(L–R) Heidi Girolamo, Lou Nicholson, Aria Bolkus and Selwood at Adelaide University in 2026

Selwood was successful at the 2026 state election, being elected to an eight-year term in the Legislative Council.
