= Caldicott (surname) =

Caldicott is a surname. Notable people with the surname include:

- David Caldicott, Irish medical doctor
- Fiona Caldicott, British psychiatrist
- John Caldicott (1828–1895), Anglican priest
- Helen Caldicott (b. 1938), Australian physician
- John Moore Caldicott, Rhodesian politician

== See also ==
- Caldecott (surname)
- Stacy Coldicott (b. 1974), English former footballer
- Steph Coldicott, contestant on Big Brother (British TV series) series 4
