= Ann Bressington =

Australian politician

Member of the South Australian Legislative Council
- In office 18 March 2006 – 15 March 2014
- Preceded by: Terry Cameron
- Succeeded by: Andrew McLachlan

Personal details
- Born: Ann Marie Bressington; 12 September 1955 (age 71) Toowoomba, Queensland, Australia
- Party: Independent
- Children: 5
- Education: Mater Dei College, Toowoomba
- Occupation: Chief executive officer (Drug Beat South Australia)
- Profession: Advocate; Politician

Ann Marie Bressington (born 12 September 1955) is an Australian politician. She was elected to the South Australian Legislative Council at the 2006 South Australian election as Nick Xenophon's running mate on his Independent No Pokies ticket. Her election was a surprise as it was not expected that two people on the ticket would be elected.

== Political career ==
Bressington was the Founder and CEO of DrugBeat South Australia, a drug treatment and rehabilitation centre. DrugBeat was founded after the 1998 death of her 22-year-old daughter, Shay-Louise, from a heroin overdose two days before moving to Adelaide for treatment. Bressington resigned from DrugBeat following her election to the Legislative Council, in order to avoid any potential conflict of interest over DrugBeat funding.

After her election to the South Australian Legislative Council, in early 2006, Bressington introduced legislation to State Parliament that would make the sale of "drug taking equipment" illegal, Definitions of drug-using paraphernalia (pipes, bongs, waterpipes and cocaine kits) were prescribed in her bill. It was subsequently reintroduced in 2008 and, receiving majority support in both the Legislative Council and the House of Assembly, was enacted shortly after.

In August 2006, Bressington announced that she would introduce a bill into Parliament which, if passed, would enforce random twice-annual drug tests of every South Australian school student from Year 8 to Year 12. The draft was amended after a consultation process involving students, parents, teachers and other politicians. When introducing her bill, Bressington warned parents to "watch closely who opposes the measure ... it will be an indication of who is soft on drugs". Dr David Caldicott, a toxicologist and research fellow of the Royal Adelaide Hospital's Emergency and Trauma Department, slammed the proposed bill as "ludicrous" and the South Australian branch of the Australian Education Union stated its opposition to the bill. However, Bressington claimed the response from parents has been "overwhelmingly positive and supportive". The bill was not passed.

On 30 August 2006, Bressington discussed the possibility of introducing a bill to raise the legal drinking age in South Australia from 18 to 21. That bill was never introduced.

After Xenophon resigned from state parliament to pursue election federal parliament, Bressington lashed out at him during the joint sitting to appoint his replacement, questioning his integrity and suitability for federal parliament. Bressington claimed Xenophon demanded she contribute $50,000 towards his campaign expenses (for which Bressington had to take out a loan) and had mismanaged campaign funds. She implied that he had made requests to State Treasury for illegal funding and said that he ignored her once she entered parliament. Xenophon denied the claims. Bressington also questioned why Xenophon had avoided the media scrutiny that other politicians are subjected to, alleging that many of his core 'anti-politician' promises warranted further investigation.

In October 2013, Bressington announced that she would be sponsoring the registration of Katter's Australian Party for the 2014 state election, at which it received a 0.1 percent upper house vote. Bressington did not re-contest her seat at the 2014 state election.

== See also ==
- Parnell-Bressington filibuster
