= Caldecote =

Caldecote is a common place name and means "cold cottage".

In the United Kingdom:

- Caldecote, Buckinghamshire (City of Milton Keynes)
- Caldecote, Huntingdonshire, Cambridgeshire
- Caldecote, South Cambridgeshire, Cambridgeshire
- Caldecote, Hertfordshire
- Caldecote, Norfolk, formerly in Swaffham Rural District
- Caldecote, Northamptonshire
- Caldecote, Warwickshire
- Chalk Farm, London, originally known as Caldecote or Chaldecote

== See also ==
- Caldecott (disambiguation)
- Caldecotte, a district in the parish of Walton, Milton Keynes, in ceremonial Buckinghamshire, England
- Caldecote, Bedfordshire (disambiguation), a pair of hamlets in Bedfordshire, England
- Caldicot (disambiguation)
