= Caldecott =

Caldecott may refer to:

== Awards ==
- The Caldecott Medal, an award for children's book illustration named after Randolph Caldecott

== People ==
- Caldecott (surname)

== Places ==
- Caldecott, Cheshire, England
- Caldecott, Northamptonshire, United Kingdom
- Caldecott, Oxfordshire, a district of Abingdon, England
- Caldecott, Rutland, United Kingdom
- Caldecott Tunnel, California, United States
- Caldecott Hill, Singapore, home of the headquarters of MediaCorp
- Caldecott MRT station, an underground Mass Rapid Transit station in Singapore
- Caldecott Road, Hong Kong, a road named after Andrew Caldecott

== See also ==
- Caldecote (disambiguation)
- Caldecotte, a district in the parish of Walton, Milton Keynes, in ceremonial Buckinghamshire, England
- Caldicot (disambiguation)
