= Penny Wright =

Australian politician

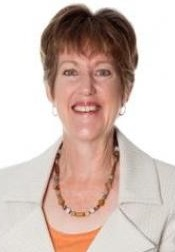

Guardian for Children and Young People in Care, South Australia
- Incumbent
- Assumed office 10 July 2017

Senator for South Australia
- In office 1 July 2011 – 10 September 2015
- Succeeded by: Robert Simms

Personal details
- Born: 19 January 1961 (age 65) Red Cliffs, Victoria
- Party: Greens
- Spouse: Mark Parnell
- Children: 3
- Education: University of Melbourne; University of Adelaide
- Profession: Lawyer

Penelope Lesley Wright (born 19 January 1961) is an Australian activist and former politician who is South Australia's Guardian for Children and Young People in Care.

Formerly a lawyer, lecturer, mediator, and Tribunal Member, she was also an Australian Greens senator for South Australia, elected at the 2010 election. She resigned in September 2015.

== Early life ==
Wright was born in 1961 at Red Cliffs in the Sunraysia region of Victoria, the sixth of seven children of Lesley and Hugh Wright. She spent much of her childhood growing up in Melbourne after her family moved there in 1968. Wright attended Wattle Park High School in Burwood before moving to MacRobertson Girls' High School for high achievers. After completing high school she studied arts/law at the University of Melbourne, later obtaining a graduate diploma in Environmental Studies in Adelaide.

Wright spent 20 years working as a lawyer prior to her election to parliament.

She became the Guardian for Children and Young People in Care on 10 July 2017.

== Political career ==
Wright is a founding member of the South Australian branch of the Greens (along with her husband Mark Parnell, a state MLC, generally considered the founder of the South Australian Greens). According to Wright, she postponed her political career at the time (1995) to raise children.

Wright was placed first on the South Australian Greens Senate ticket for the 2010 federal election. The party received a 6.8 percent swing in South Australia, finishing with 13.3 percent of the statewide Senate vote. Wright joined eight other Green Senators in the upper house from the start of July 2011, including incumbent South Australian Greens senator Sarah Hanson-Young.

On commencing her senate term in July 2011, Wright was assigned the portfolios of Attorney-General, Native Title, Veterans' Affairs, Social Inclusion, Mental Health and Heritage within the federal Greens. She went on to hold the Attorney-General, Veterans' Affairs, Mental Health and Schools and Education Portfolios.

On 17 July 2015, Wright announced that she would be resigning from the Senate due to illness in her family. She gave her final speech on 19 August, and resigned on 9 September. Robert Simms was appointed to the casual vacancy by a joint sitting of the Parliament of South Australia on 22 September 2015.

== Personal life ==
Wright is married to Mark Parnell with whom she moved to Adelaide in 1989 following 9 months in Europe. Wright and Parnell have three children, Felix, Eleanor and Mungo.

Following Mungo's suicide at the age of 21 in September 2016, his parents used his death to raise awareness of organ donation after donating his corneas.
