= Mark Parnell =

Australian politician

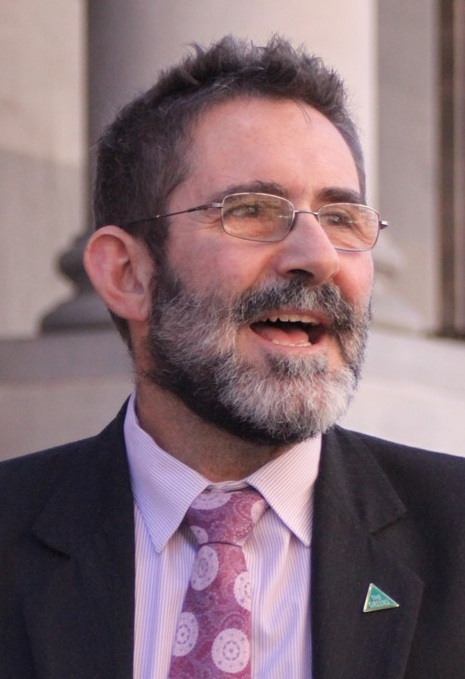

Member of the South Australian Legislative Council
- In office 18 March 2006 – 9 April 2021
- Succeeded by: Robert Simms

Personal details
- Born: 9 September 1959 (age 65); Melbourne, Victoria, Australia
- Political party: SA Greens
- Spouse: Penny Wright
- Children: 3
- Website: MarkParnell.org.au

Mark Charles Parnell (born 9 September 1959) is an Australian former politician and parliamentary leader of the SA Greens in the South Australian Legislative Council. He was the first SA Greens representative to be elected to the Parliament of South Australia, at the 2006 election. He was re-elected for another eight-year term in the Legislative Council at the 2014 election. Parnell announced he would retire at the 2022 state election, but resigned from the parliament early to give his successor (Robert Simms) an "opportunity to make his mark in Parliament ahead of the election".

== Early life ==
Parnell holds a Bachelor of Laws and Commerce from the University of Melbourne, and a Master of Regional and Urban Planning from the University of South Australia. He is admitted as Barrister and Solicitor of the Supreme Courts of Victoria and South Australia.

=== Early career ===
Parnell was a founding member of the South Australian Greens and, prior to being elected, was a solicitor with the Environmental Defenders Office, a free community legal centre specialising in public interest environmental law. In ten years with the Environmental Defenders Office, Mark helped many hundreds of clients on a wide range of state and national planning, pollution, biodiversity or resource matters. In 1999, he successfully represented the Conservation Council of South Australia in the State's longest ever environment trial, over tuna feedlots in Louth Bay. He also represented the Whyalla Red Dust Action Group Inc in its long-running campaign for environmental justice over OneSteel (formerly BHP) dust emissions from the Whyalla Steelworks.

Prior to his 10 years with the Environmental Defenders Office, Parnell was a campaign co-ordinator with The Wilderness Society (2 years) and the Australian Conservation Foundation (4 years). Parnell also spent 4 years working as a solicitor in private practice in country Victoria in the mid-1980s.

=== Political career ===
On 8 May 2008 Parnell delivered a record-breaking filibuster of more than 8 hours in the Legislative Council. His speech, and that of No Pokies MLC Ann Bressington which followed, were designed to highlight the lack of opposition by either major party to a bill changing the workers compensation scheme known as WorkCover. Parnell denied his speech deserved the label of "filibuster" as he considered himself and Bressington responsible for presenting the entire opposing case. See: 2008 Parnell–Bressington filibuster

In February 2011 Parnell condemned policy decisions by the state Labor government such as approval of the Mount Barker redevelopment and the renewal of the uranium exploration company Marathon Resources' right to drill in Arkaroola sanctuary. He said "The left-right stuff doesn't really work for me anymore, there's fewer and fewer things to distinguish them [and] members are carefully watching the performance of the major parties".

== Personal life ==
Parnell is married to South Australia's Guardian for Children and Young People in Care, Penny Wright. In 1989 they moved to Adelaide following 9 months in Europe. Parnell and Wright have three children, Felix, Eleanor and Mungo.

Following Mungo's suicide at the age of 21 in September 2016, his parents used his death to raise awareness of organ donation after donating his corneas.

== See also ==
- 2008 Parnell–Bressington filibuster
- 2006 South Australian state election
- 2010 South Australian state election
