= Caldicot (disambiguation) =

Caldicot is a town and community in Monmouthshire Wales.

Caldicot may also refer to:

- Caldicot, Buckinghamshire, England

== In Monmouthshire, Wales ==
- Caldicot Hundred
- Caldicot railway station, a part of the British railway system
- Caldicot RFC, a Welsh rugby union club

== See also ==
- Caldecote (disambiguation)
- Caldicott (disambiguation)
- Caldecott (disambiguation)
- Caldecotte, a district in the parish of Walton, Milton Keynes, in ceremonial Buckinghamshire, England
