= 2006 South Australian state election =

Election for the 51st Parliament of South Australia

- 18 March 2006

All 47 seats in the South Australian House of Assembly 24 seats were needed for a majority 11 (of the 22) seats in the South Australian Legislative Council
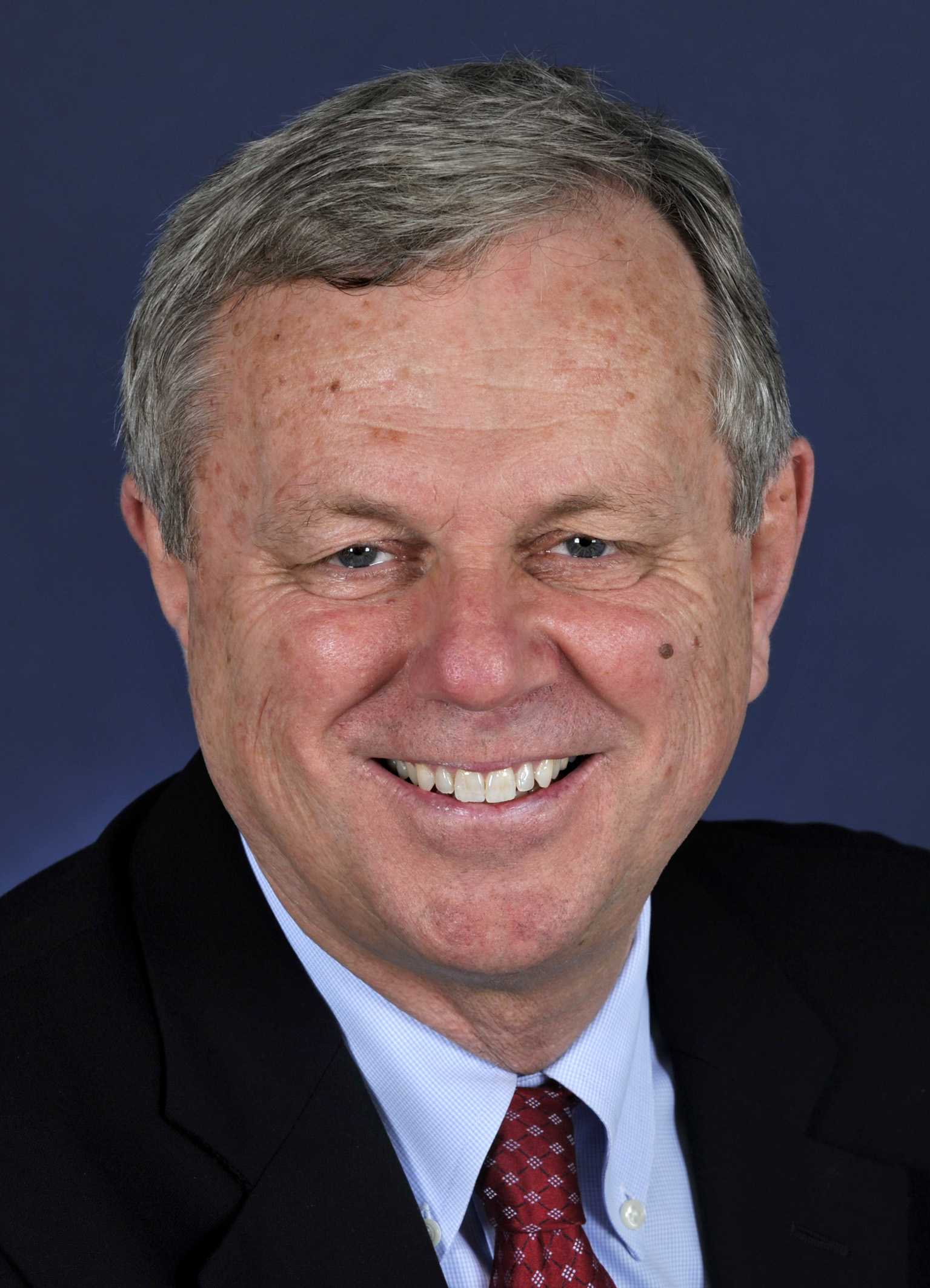

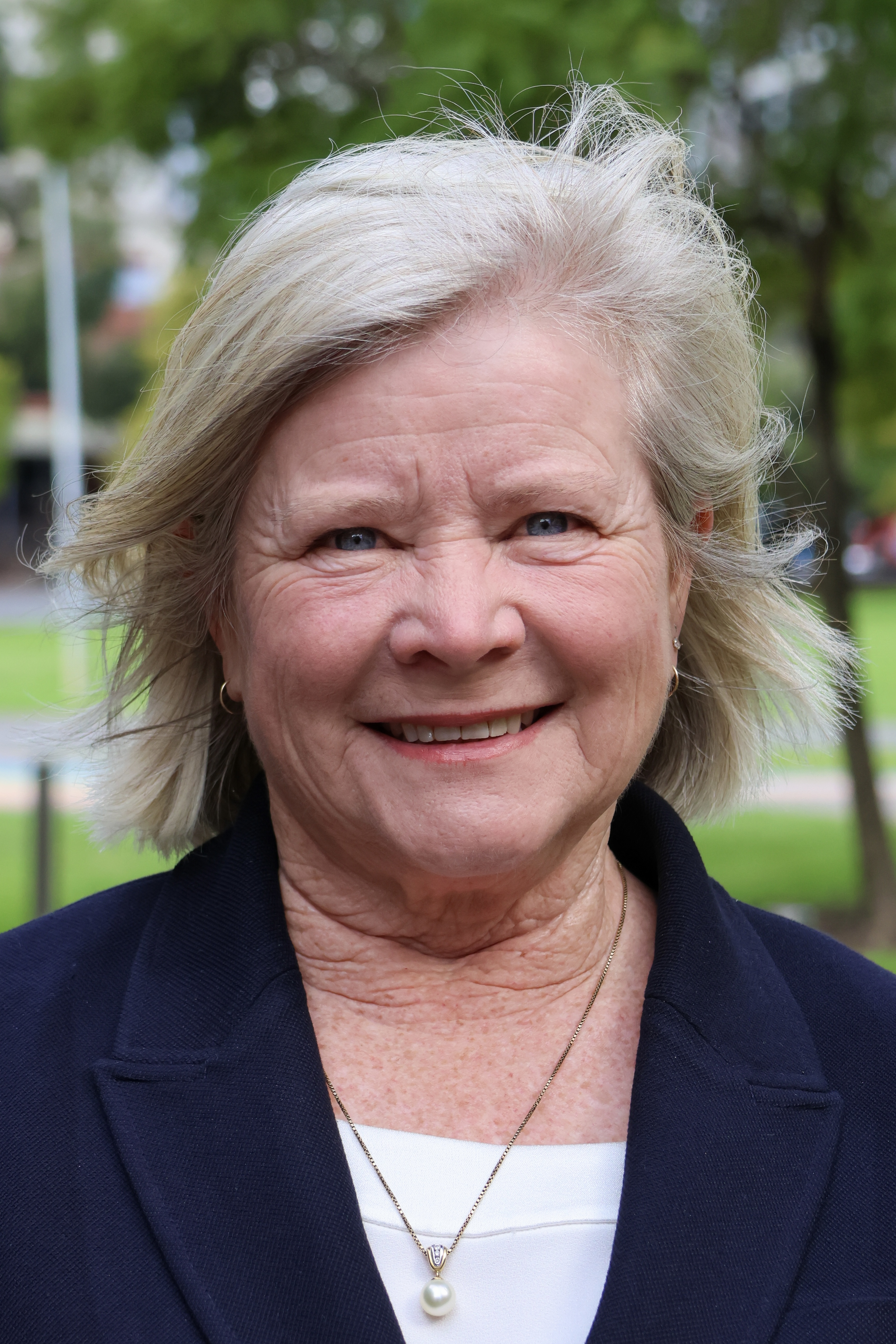
	First party	Second party	Third party
Leader	Mike Rann	Rob Kerin	Karlene Maywald
Party	Labor	Liberal	National
Leader since	5 November 1994	22 October 2001	11 October 1997
Leader's seat	Ramsay	Frome	Chaffey
Last election	23 seats	20 seats	1 seat
Seats won	28	15	1
Seat change	▲5	▼5	Steady
Primary vote	424,715	319,041	19,636
Percentage	45.22%	33.97%	2.09%
Swing	▲8.88	▼6.00	▲0.64
TPP	56.78%	43.22%
TPP swing	▲7.71pp	▼7.71pp
Premier before election
Mike Rann
Labor
Elected Premier
Mike Rann
Labor

The 2006 South Australian state election was held on 18 March 2006 to elect the 51st Parliament of South Australia, including all members of the House of Assembly and eleven members of the Legislative Council. The election was conducted by State Electoral Office.

In the 47-seat South Australian House of Assembly, the Labor government was returned in a landslide with 28 seats from a 56.8 per cent two-party-preferred vote, winning six seats from the Liberal Party. The Liberals were reduced to just 15 seats, the worst result in their history at the time.

In the 22-seat South Australian Legislative Council, the balance of power has been continuously held by the crossbench since the 1985 election. With half of the seats up for election, Labor gained an additional seat at the expense of the Liberals, Nick Xenophon and No Pokies rose to prominence after unexpectedly winning a historic fifth of the entire statewide vote, the Greens won their first seat, Family First won their second seat to hold two seats, while the faltering Democrats failed to win a seat for the first time in their history.

== Key dates ==
- Issue of writ: 20 February 2006
- Close of electoral rolls: 27 February 2006
- Close of nominations: Thursday 2 March 2006, at noon
- O: Monday 6 March 2006
- Polling day: 18 March 2006
- Return of writ: On or before 28 April 2006 (actually returned 6 April)

== Results summary ==
=== House of Assembly ===
The centre-left Australian Labor Party, elected in 2002 and led by Premier Mike Rann of the Rann government, gained six Liberal-held seats and a 7.7 per cent statewide two-party preferred swing, resulting in a net gain of five seats and the first Labor majority government since the 1985 election with 28 of the 47 House of Assembly (lower house) seats.

The centre-right South Australian Division of the Liberal Party of Australia, led by Leader of the Opposition Rob Kerin, regained a former independent seat while losing other seats – a net loss of five seats. The Liberals were left with only 15 seats, at the time the party's worst showing in South Australian electoral history. It has since been outdone by the 2026 state election, in which the Liberals were reduced to a rump of five seats.

Independent members Bob Such and Rory McEwen were re-elected. Kris Hanna, elected in 2002 representing Labor, was re-elected as an independent member. The sitting Nationals SA member Karlene Maywald was also re-elected.

=== Legislative Council ===
With 11 of the 22-member Legislative Council (upper house) standing for election, both major parties finished with a total of eight of the 22 seats, with Labor winning four of the 11 and the Liberals winning three. No Pokies independent Nick Xenophon polled 20.5 per cent, an unprecedented result for an independent or minor party, which resulted in both Xenophon and his running mate, Ann Bressington, being elected. Xenophon's third running mate, John Darley, was later appointed to the vacancy created by Xenophon's resignation. Family First had a second member elected. The Democrats vote collapsed with no candidate elected, leaving them with one remaining member in the upper house. The SA Greens won a seat for the first time.

=== Leadership changes ===
Following the outcome of the election, the member for Davenport, Iain Evans, replaced Rob Kerin as leader of the Liberal Party and thus as Leader of the Opposition.

== Party backgrounds ==
=== Australian Labor Party ===
The Australian Labor Party is Australia's oldest political party, founded in 1891. It is a centre-left social democratic party which is formally linked to the trade union labour movement. At a state level, the South Australian Branch of the Australian Labor Party had been in government since the previous election in 2002, having been in opposition from 1993 to 2002. Since the 1970 election ending decades of electoral malapportionment of the Playmander, nine of the 12 elections since have been won by Labor. Labor's most notable premiers in South Australia include Thomas Price in the 1900s, reformist Don Dunstan in the 1970s, John Bannon in the 1980s and the factionally nonaligned and pragmatic Mike Rann. The party's deputy leader, and therefore the Deputy Premier, was Kevin Foley.

=== Liberal Party of Australia ===
The South Australian Division of the Liberal Party of Australia is a centre-right conservative liberal party with close links to business and advocating free markets. Whilst primarily a socially conservative party, there exists a more socially liberal wing, colloquially known as 'wet', 'moderate' or small-l liberals, highlighted by the short-lived Liberal Movement who first contested the 1975 election as a separate party led by Steele Hall. At state level, in 1973 the South Australian Division of the Liberal Party of Australia emerged from the Liberal and Country League (LCL), which in turn had resulted from a merger between the Liberal Federation and the Country Party in 1932. The state opposition leader at the 2006 election, Rob Kerin, was seen as being largely aloof from factional disputes.

=== Nationals SA ===
The Nationals SA is a sub-division of the conservative National Party of Australia (formerly the Country Party). First contesting the 1965 election, they have only held two seats: Flinders (1973–1993) and Chaffey (1997–2010). Former member Karlene Maywald, representing the Riverland district of Chaffey, accepted a cabinet position in 2004 as part of the Rann Labor government, as Minister for the River Murray, Minister for Regional Development, Minister for Small Business, and later Minister for Water Security.

This informal ALP-NAT coalition (the first since 1935) caused an uproar, with the federal Liberal member for the SA seat of Sturt, Christopher Pyne, calling for Maywald's expulsion from the Nationals, and Patrick Secker calling for a corruption enquiry into the appointment. Neither eventuated. As the Liberal Party in South Australia is descended from a historical merger from an earlier Country Party, the SA Nationals are not as dominant in rural areas as their eastern state counterparts.

=== SA Greens ===
The SA Greens, founded in 1995, are a sub-division of the left-wing Australian Greens. They are based on green politics and consider themselves a new politics party with strong beliefs in ecology, democracy and social justice amongst other issues. Federally and locally they have seen a continued rise in primary votes, in part due to the demise of the Australian Democrats. The 2007 federal election saw 77.28% of the Greens' preferences flow to Labor over the Liberal Party in SA. The party's parliamentary leader is Mark Parnell.

=== Family First Party ===
The Family First Party, founded immediately before the 2002 state election, has a political ideology based on Christian-influenced conservatism. Although officially a secular party, it has close links to the Pentecostal movement, and in particular the Assemblies of God denomination. Its social policies generally mirror conservative Christian values (but not necessarily politically conservative values). The 2007 federal election saw 57.10% of their preferences flow to the Liberals over the Labor Party in SA. The party's leader at the time of the election was Andrew Evans.

=== Australian Democrats ===
The Australian Democrats were originally a centrist party, with most current policies based on social liberalism. Federally, the party was founded in 1977 by Liberal splinter groups known as the Liberal Movement, which had split from its parent over electoral reform, and the Australia Party, which had rebelled against Australia's involvement in the Vietnam War. The Australian Democrats were founded by Don Chipp, who had also left the Liberal Party, citing dissatisfaction with the increasing underrepresentation of small-l liberals within the party.

At the state level, it is descended from the New Liberal Movement (New LM) of Robin Millhouse, who held the Democrats' only lower house seats, Mitcham and its successor seat Waite. The Democrats had suffered internal problems and leadership scuffles since 1997. The 2007 federal election saw 65.79% of Democrat preferences flow to Labor over the Liberal Party in SA. The party's leader at the election was Sandra Kanck.

== Electoral system ==
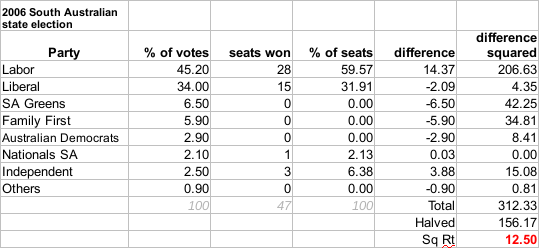
The disproportionality of the 2006 election was 12.50 according to the Gallagher Index.

South Australia is governed by the principles of the Westminster system, a form of parliamentary government based on the model of the United Kingdom. Legislative power rests with the Parliament of South Australia, which consists of The Sovereign (represented by the Governor of South Australia), the House of Assembly (lower house) which forms the government, and the Legislative Council (upper house) as a house of review. Forty-seven members of the lower house represent single-member electorates and are elected under the full-preference Instant-runoff voting (IRV) system for fixed four-year terms. The independent State Electoral Office, which conducts elections, is responsible for a mandatory redistricting of boundaries before each election to ensure one vote one value. At each election, voters choose half of the 22 upper house members, each of whom serves eight-year terms in a single statewide electorate.

The Legislative Council is elected under the preferential Single Transferable Vote (STV) system through a means of Group voting tickets. Voters can choose to vote for a ticket by placing the number '1' in one of the ticket boxes "above the line" or can vote for individual candidates by numbering all the boxes "below the line" (54 in the 2006 election). In above the line voting, ticket votes are distributed according to the party or group voting ticket registered before the election with the election management body. As more than 95% of ballot papers are above the line, this form of voting often leads to pre-election trading between parties on how each party will allocate later preferences to other parties and candidates.

Voting is compulsory once enrolled in South Australian elections, which results in turnout rates above 90 per cent. Informal voting, which occurs when a voting slip is not valid, is at a rate of under five per cent. Voting slips are informal when they are not filled out correctly, such examples are not numbering subsequent numbers, not filling out all the candidate boxes with numbers (except the last candidate), or in some other way that is verified by the State Electoral Office as illegible. South Australian elections have some features that are unique to the rest of Australia.

As elections have fixed four-year terms, the election date of 18 March 2006 was known well ahead of time. The Electoral Act stipulates that the election is to be held on the third Saturday in March every four years. The election campaign must run for a minimum of 25 days or a maximum of 55 days, therefore the Governor would have needed to issue writs for the election by 21 February 2006 at the latest. On 20 February, Premier Mike Rann invited Governor Marjorie Jackson-Nelson to issue writs for the election. In accordance with electoral regulations, the Electoral Commissioner then advertised key dates for the election of the House of Assembly and half of the Legislative Council – close of rolls on 27 February 2006 at noon, nominations to be received by 2 March 2006 at noon, polling day on 18 March 2006, and the return of writs on or before 28 April 2006.

== Election background ==
In the 2002 election, Labor won 23 seats, the Liberals 20, Nationals 1, and conservative Independents won three. As 24 seats are required to govern, the Liberal Party was expected to retain government with the support of all four independents. However, in a surprise decision, one of the conservative independents, Peter Lewis, decided to support Labor in exchange for holding a constitutional convention, making him speaker of the House of Assembly, and concessions for his electorate including the phasing out of commercial fishing in the River Murray, prioritising the eradication of the branched broomrape weed, changing water rates for irrigation, fast-tracking a feasibility study for a weir and lock at Wellington, and improving rural roads. Lewis resigned as speaker in April 2005 after controversy over allegations of paedophilia he had made about a serving MP. However, by this time, Labor had already gained the support of independents Bob Such and Rory McEwen in 2002, as well as Nationals SA member Karlene Maywald in 2004. Such was given the position of speaker for the remainder of the government's term.

== Campaign ==
The Labor campaign was heavily based around Premier Mike Rann with Labor's advertising swapping between the mottos "Building South Australia" and, to a greater extent, "RANN Gets Results". Some commentators also argued that the "presidential" style of campaign, common in modern Australian politics, could be seen in Labor's formal campaign launch at the Norwood Town Hall the Sunday before the election, which had some similarities to the nomination conventions that the major parties hold in the United States.

Another facet of the Labor campaign was extensive negative campaigning against Liberal leader Rob Kerin, including an advertisement featuring an excerpt of an interview that Kerin had with FIVEaa presenter Keith Conlon, who asked Kerin why he wanted to be leader of the Liberal Party. Kerin stammered for a few seconds and gave the impression that he was uncertain. The advertisement concluded with the question, "Does Rob Want The Job?". Conlon complained that the advertisement gave the false impression that he was endorsing Labor, but Labor campaign director David Feeney dismissed his concerns. Other negative advertisements run by Labor revolved around the actions of the previous Liberal government—one advertisement and leaflet reminded voters that while in power, the previous Liberal government closed 65 schools, closed hospital wards, and privatised the Electricity Trust of South Australia.

Considered "strapped for cash", the Liberal Party ran a very limited television and radio campaign. Businessman Robert Gerard was forced to resign from his Federal Liberal Party-appointed position on the board of the Reserve Bank of Australia due to the party appointing him to the position despite the known fact that he had outstanding tax avoidance issues being dealt with by the Australian Taxation Office, and had thus subsequently pulled out of his traditional role of bankrolling the state division of the party, leaving the party with "only enough funds for the most basic campaign". Kerin indicated people would have to "wait and see" if there would be any campaign, even asking trade unions for donations, no matter how small. The advertisements that did run argued that Labor was wasting record tax receipts from the GST. A number of embarrassments for the Liberal Party surrounded their television advertisement—in an early version released to journalists, Labor was spelt "Labour" (Labor cabinet minister King O'Malley dropped the 'u' in 1912 to "modernise" it as per American English) and the advertisement alleged that South Australia's hospital waiting lists were the worst in the nation, which Labor successfully disputed to the Electoral Commissioner. During the election campaign, David Pisoni, the Liberal candidate for Unley, made allegations in his advertising that Labor and their candidate Michael Keenan supported controversial urban infill programmes, which Labor flatly denied. Electoral Commissioner Kay Mousley investigated and ordered that the advertisements be withdrawn and corrections be run at Pisoni's expense.

The Labor minority government sought to win a majority in the House of Assembly. Opinion polls indicated that this was likely and ABC elections expert Antony Green said that the "Labor government looks set to be returned with an increased majority". Centrebet had Labor at odds of $1.01 and the Liberals at $12.00 for a majority government.

Most commentators agreed that the Liberal Party had little chance of winning government, and that Kerin would step down from the leadership after the election, a suspicion confirmed in Kerin's concession speech. Martin Hamilton-Smith was considering mounting a leadership challenge, however, he withdrew on 14 October 2005 (probably for the sake of the impression of party unity) and subsequently resigned or was pushed from the opposition frontbench.

== Issues ==
Labor website header during the election campaign. Similar designs were used on ALP stationery and posters.

One of the most publicised issues prior to the election was the tram extension from Victoria Square to the Adelaide railway station which the Liberals, despite having proposed the idea in their previous transport plan, now opposed. Construction began in April 2007 and was operational as of October 2007. The Adelaide Airport expansion suffered fuel delivery related delays that Labor was criticised for. A perennial election issue, lack of safety improvement of the Britannia Roundabout was focused on by the Norwood Liberal candidate. Land and payroll tax cuts worth $1.5 billion were announced by Labor, the largest in the state's history. The tax cuts coincided with South Australia achieving an economic "Triple A" rating under the current Labor government. Business SA chief executive Peter Vaughan "praised" Labor's economic management.

The Advertiser revealed details of "the biggest project of its kind in South Australia's history", a $1.5 billion redevelopment on the western bank of the inner harbour. The development will include 2000 new homes on government-owned land and new buildings as high as 12 storeys. This followed the awarding of a $6 billion air warfare destroyer contract to ASC Pty Ltd, based in the electorate at Osborne.

The future of the River Murray has come under threat due to falling water levels, and in an unprecedented move, Nationals MP Karlene Maywald was given a cabinet position as Minister for the River Murray in 2004. Possible nuclear waste dumps were of concern to many Adelaide residents; Premier Rann successfully lobbied against any federal government proposals.

Law and order was another key issue, with Labor promising extra police. Tough drink and drug driving laws had also been introduced which included zero tolerance roadside testing for Tetrahydrocannabinol (THC) and Methamphetamine, and later MDMA. Labor introduced speed limit reduction legislation which took effect in March 2003 which saw non-arterial non-main roads and most Adelaide CBD roads reduce from 60 km/h to 50 km/h. The Liberals proposed to increase the speed limit back to 60 km/h for several roads, concentrated mainly around the Adelaide Park Lands.

Allegations were made over the condition of the state's health system and the capacity to deal with mental health issues. Labor pledged to buy back Modbury Hospital located in the district of Florey, privatised under the Liberal government to alleviate the effect of the State Bank collapse.

The need for homosexual law reform was acknowledged by both major parties, but progress had been delayed, causing disquiet among Labor members. In December 2006, the Domestic Partners bill was passed, providing greater recognition to same-sex relationships on a range of issues such as superannuation. The bill was initially supported by all parties after much negotiation, but in the end was voted against by members of Family First, as well as Liberal Terry Stephens.

Electoral reform policies received little attention, as did the eventually shelved referendum proposal by the Rann government to abolish or reform the Legislative Council. WorkCover underfunded liability increases also received little attention, despite the fact that the liability had climbed from a disputed $67 to $85 million to $700 million since Labor came into government in 2002 due to a more generous compensation scheme. Labor also considered reforming the scheme, including cutting payments to injured workers.

There were claims that federal industrial relations reform, WorkChoices, was an influential issue in the election. The Liberals announced 4,000 public service job cuts to fund their election promises.

== Polling ==
Newspoll polling is conducted via random telephone number selection in city and country areas. Roy Morgan polling is conducted face-to-face Australia-wide. Sampling sizes consist of 500–1000 electors, Roy Morgan has a sampling tolerance (the Margin of error) of ±3.2 per cent for a 40 to 60 per cent rating in a sample size of 1000 electors, and ±4.5 for 500 electors. The sampling tolerance rate is lower for high and low percentages.

Preferred premier ratings^
Date	Rann	Kerin
Jan – Mar 2007	64%	*14%
Oct – Dec 2006	61%	*14%
15–16 March 2006	63%	21%
Jan – Feb 2006	59%	19%
Oct – Dec 2005	60%	16%
Jul – Sep 2005	60%	16%
Apr – Jun 2005	60%	17%
Jan – Mar 2005	61%	15%
Pre 2002 election	30%	50%
Source: Newspoll/The Australian^ Remainder were "uncommitted" to either leader. * Iain Evans

South Australian state voting intention (Newspoll)
	Primary vote								Two party preferred
	Lib	Nat	ALP	Dem	FFP	ONP	Grn	Oth	Lib	ALP
Jan – Mar 2007	29%	1%	48%	4%	2%	0%	6%	10%	39%	61%
Oct – Dec 2006	33%	1%	47%	2%	3%	0%	4%	10%	42%	58%
2006 election	34.0%	2.1%	45.2%	2.9%	5.9%	0.3%	6.5%	3.2%	43.2%	56.8%
15–16 March 2006	33%	1.5%	46%	1.5%	3%	0%	4%	11%	43%	57%
Jan – Feb 2006	37%	2%	44%	2%	2%	0%	3%	10%	46%	54%
Oct – Dec 2005	35%	2%	46%	1%	2%	0%	4%	10%	44%	56%
Jul – Sep 2005	38%	2%	45%	1%	1%	0%	4%	10%	46%	54%
2002 election	40.0%	1.5%	36.3%	7.5%	2.6%	2.4%	2.4%	7.3%	50.9%	49.1%
Source: Newspoll/The Australian

South Australian state voting intention (Roy Morgan)
	Primary vote							Two party preferred
	Lib	ALP	Dem	FFP	ONP	Grn	Oth	Lib	ALP
December 2006	27.0%	55.5%	3%	4%	0.5%	4%	6%	34%	66%
2006 election	34.0%	45.2%	2.9%	5.9%	0.3%	6.5%	5.3%	43.2%	56.8%
March 2006 ¹	30.5%	50.5%	2%	2%	0.5%	8%	6.5%	38.5%	61.5%
February 2006 ²	31.5%	50.5%	5%	3.5%	0%	4%	5.5%	38.5%	61.5%
January 2006	33%	50.5%	3%	3.5%	0.5%	4.5%	5%	39.5%	60.5%
December 2005	32%	49%	4%	5.5%	1%	4%	4.5%	39.5%	60.5%
October 2005	33%	50%	3.5%	3.5%	0.5%	4.5%	5%	37.5%	62.5%
August 2005	32%	53%	3%	4%	1%	3.5%	3.5%	38%	62%
June 2005	33%	54%	1%	4%	0.5%	4%	3.5%	38%	62%
2002 election	40.0%	36.3%	7.5%	2.6%	2.4%	2.4%	8.8%	50.9%	49.1%
Source: Roy Morgan Research – ¹ Post-election announcement – ² Pre-election announcement

== Results ==
=== House of Assembly ===
South Australian state election, 18 March 2006 House of Assembly << 2002–2010 >>
Enrolled voters	1,055,347				
Votes cast	974,190		Turnout	92.31	–1.28
Informal votes	35,029		Informal	3.60	+0.48
Summary of votes by party
Party	Primary votes	%	Swing	Seats	Change
Labor	424,715	45.22	▲+8.88	28	+ 5
Liberal	319,041	33.97	▼–6.00	15	– 5
Greens	60,949	6.49	▲+4.13	0	0
Family First	55,192	5.88	▲+3.24	0	0
Democrats	27,179	2.89	▼–4.60	0	0
National	19,636	2.09	▲+0.64	1	0
Dignity for Disabled	3,974	0.42	New	0	0
One Nation	2,591	0.28	▼–2.13	0	0
No Rodeo	2,131	0.23	New	0	0
Independent	23,753	2.53	▼–1.72	3	0
Total	939,161			47	
Two-party-preferred
Labor	533,290	56.78	▲+7.71		
Liberal	405,871	43.22	▼–7.71		

Popular vote
Labor	45.22%
Liberal	33.97%
Greens	6.49%
Family First	5.88%
Democrats	2.89%
Independents	2.53%
National	2.09%
Others	0.93%

Two-party-preferred vote
Labor	56.78%
Liberal	43.22%

Seats
Labor	59.57%
Liberal	31.91%
Independents	6.38%
National	2.13%

The final results for the House of Assembly seats were 28 Labor, 15 Liberal, three independents and one National. First preference and two party preferred statistics for each district are available through the South Australian House of Assembly electoral districts article.

Labor won six of eight key seats, the Liberals one of three. Labor's wins included the previously marginal Liberal seats of Hartley, Light, Morialta, Mawson, Bright and Newland. The Liberals regained Peter Lewis' seat of Hammond.

SA Nationals MP Karlene Maywald and independent MPs Bob Such, Rory McEwen and Kris Hanna were all re-elected. Hanna was elected at the 2002 election as a Labor candidate; this counted as a loss for Labor, giving Labor a net gain of five seats.

Labor, the Liberals and the Greens ran in all 47 seats, the Democrats ran in all but Giles which resulted in a contested seat vote of three per cent, Family First ran in all but Ramsay and Croydon with a contested seat vote of 6.1 per cent. The Nationals ran in Chaffey, Flinders, Finniss, and MacKillop, averaging 24.8 per cent in those seats. Dignity for Disabled, No Rodeo and One Nation ran in 10, 7 and 6 six seats respectively.

Jack Snelling became speaker of the House of Assembly.

==== Key Liberal seats ====
The outer southern suburbs district of Mawson was first won by former Liberal Police Minister Robert Brokenshire in the 1993 state election. He was defeated by former radio presenter Leon Bignell, who gained a 5.7 per cent two party preferred swing for Labor.

The other outer suburbs district that fell to Labor was Bright, which had been held since 1989 by former Liberal energy minister Wayne Matthew, who decided to retire at this election. The seat was contested for the Liberals by Legislative Council member Angus Redford, who faced a tougher fight than expected. He was defeated by Labor's Chloë Fox, who received a 14.4 per cent swing on a two party preferred basis, the largest in the state.

The inner southern suburbs district of Unley was won in 2002 by outspoken Liberal Mark Brindal who failed to win preselection for the seat and moved to contest the marginal Labor seat of Adelaide, but was shrouded in a controversy concerning a sexual relationship that Brindal had with a mentally ill man, forcing him to withdraw. The Liberal candidate was businessman David Pisoni, while Labor fielded Unley Mayor Michael Keenan. Despite a 7.9 per cent two party preferred swing against him, Pisoni hung onto the seat by 1.1 per cent.

The inner north eastern suburbs district of Hartley had been won by Joe Scalzi in 1993 and held by a very narrow margin in each subsequent election. The district has a very high proportion of Italian migrants and the ability to speak the language is considered by many commentators as being vital for a candidate to win the seat. This was a factor in Labor's preselection of political staffer Grace Portolesi, who defeated Scalzi with a 5.9 per cent two party preferred swing.

The neighbouring district of Morialta had been held by former Liberal Tourism Minister Joan Hall since 1993. She was defeated by Labor's Lindsay Simmons, who received a 12 per cent two party preferred swing, reclaiming the seat for Labor for the first time since 1975.

In the outer north-east, the district of Newland had been won by Liberal Dorothy Kotz since 1989. After her decision to retire, the Liberals preselected police officer and local councillor Mark Osterstock. He was defeated by Labor's Tom Kenyon, who recorded a 12.5 per cent two party preferred swing.

Light, which contains Gawler and the outer northern suburbs, was recontested by sitting Liberal member and former Education Minister Malcolm Buckby. He was defeated by Labor candidate and Gawler Mayor Tony Piccolo, who received a 4.9 per cent two party preferred swing. This was the first time since 1944 that Labor had won the seat.

The rural and outback district of Stuart was first won in 1997 by Liberal Graham Gunn, a 40-year member of parliament and former Speaker. As in 2002, he was challenged by Labor ministerial adviser Justin Jarvis. Unlike the Adelaide metropolitan area and the neighbouring seat of Giles, there was only a small swing of 0.7 per cent to Labor, so Gunn managed to hang on with a margin of 0.6 per cent.

==== Key Labor seats ====
The inner eastern suburbs district of Norwood, held for Labor by former Norwood mayor Vini Ciccarello, was expected to be a tough contest, particularly after the Liberal preselection of former Adelaide Crows footballer Nigel Smart. Ciccarello retained the seat picking up a 3.7 per cent swing on the two party preferred vote.

The other Labor seat considered vulnerable was the neighbouring inner city district of Adelaide where high-profile Education Minister and former Lord Mayor Jane Lomax-Smith was challenged by Liberal Diana Carroll. Lomax-Smith comprehensively defeated Carroll with a 9.2 per cent swing to Labor on the two-party preferred vote.

==== Key independent seats ====
The southern suburbs district of Mitchell was won at the 2002 election by Labor's Kris Hanna. After the election, Hanna defected to the Greens and subsequently left and became an independent on 8 February 2006. Hanna faced a tough contest against by Labor's Rosemary Clancy. Despite pre-election expectations of a safe Labor win, Hanna defeated Clancy by 0.6 per cent with the aid of Liberal preferences. Labor won a 65.2 per cent two-party vote against the Liberals.

The district of Fisher, located in Adelaide's south, was held by independent MP Bob Such. Late in the campaign, there was some speculation that Fisher may have been a closer contest than commentators initially expected, but Such comfortably defeated Labor's Amanda Rishworth and the Liberals' Andy Minnis with an independent candidate election best 45.2 per cent of the primary vote, picking up a 4.6 per cent two candidate preferred swing. The election outcome saw Such facing the Labor candidate on the two party preferred vote as opposed to the Liberal candidate in 2002. Labor won a 59.4 per cent two-party vote against the Liberals.

The Riverland-based district of Chaffey was the only seat held by Nationals SA. River Murray Minister Karlene Maywald easily defeated Liberal Anna Baric. Maywald received a 3.2 per cent swing on the two party preferred vote. The Liberals won a 71.8 per cent two-party vote against Labor.

The district of Mount Gambier (which also includes much of South Australia's south east) was a close contest between independent and Agriculture Minister Rory McEwen and Liberal Peter Gandolfi. McEwen prevailed despite a 20.4 per cent swing against him on the two party preferred vote. The Liberals won a 55.6 per cent two-party vote against Labor.

The Murray Bridge based district of Hammond was won in 2002 by independent MP Peter Lewis who then cut a deal to deliver government to Labor. Facing almost certain defeat, he declined to recontest the district and his attempt to win a seat in the Legislative Council failed. Hammond was won comfortably by Liberal Adrian Pederick.

With Mitchell and Fisher included, Labor won the two-party vote in 30 of 47 seats.

==== Seats changing hands ====
Seat	Pre-2006			Swing	Post-2006		
Seat	Party	Member	Margin	Swing	Margin	Member	Party
Bright	Liberal	Wayne Matthew	5.0	14.3	9.4	Chloë Fox	Labor
Hammond	Independent	Peter Lewis	2.0	N/A	12.0*	Adrian Pederick	Liberal
Hartley	Liberal	Joe Scalzi	2.2	6.8	4.6	Grace Portolesi	Labor
Light	Liberal	Malcolm Buckby	2.3	4.4	2.1	Tony Piccolo	Labor
Mawson	Liberal	Robert Brokenshire	3.6	5.8	2.2	Leon Bignell	Labor
Morialta	Liberal	Joan Hall	3.3	11.2	7.9	Lindsay Simmons	Labor
Newland	Liberal	Dorothy Kotz	5.5	12.3	6.8	Tom Kenyon	Labor

- Members listed in italics did not contest their seat at this election.
- *Hammond's second margin figure is Liberal vs. Labor.

==== Post-election pendulum ====
The following pendulum is known as the Mackerras pendulum after its inventor, the psephologist Malcolm Mackerras. The pendulum works by lining up all of the seats held in the House of Assembly according to the percentage point margin they are held by on a two party preferred basis. This is also known as the swing required for the seat to change hands. Given a uniform swing to the opposition or government parties, the number of seats that change hands can be predicted. The seats are classified as follows: marginal 0–5.99 per cent, fairly safe 6–10 per cent, safe over 10 per cent.

Labor seats (32)
Marginal
Mitchell	Kris Hanna	IND	0.6% v ALP
Light	Tony Piccolo	ALP	2.1%
Mawson	Leon Bignell	ALP	2.2%
Norwood	Vini Ciccarello	ALP	4.2%
Hartley	Grace Portolesi	ALP	4.6%
Fairly safe
Mount Gambier	Rory McEwen	IND	6.2% v LIB
Newland	Tom Kenyon	ALP	6.8%
Morialta	Lindsay Simmons	ALP	7.9%
Bright	Chloë Fox	ALP	9.4%
Safe
Adelaide	Jane Lomax-Smith	ALP	10.2%
Florey	Frances Bedford	ALP	12.1%
Giles	Lyn Breuer	ALP	14.4%
Elder	Pat Conlon	ALP	14.9%
Wright	Jennifer Rankine	ALP	15.3%
Ashford	Steph Key	ALP	16.1%
Colton	Paul Caica	ALP	16.3%
Fisher	Bob Such	IND	16.7% v ALP
Little Para	Lea Stevens	ALP	16.7%
Chaffey	Karlene Maywald	NAT	17.2% v LIB
Reynell	Gay Thompson	ALP	17.6%
West Torrens	Tom Koutsantonis	ALP	18.3%
Torrens	Robyn Geraghty	ALP	19.1%
Lee	Michael Wright	ALP	19.3%
Kaurna	John Hill	ALP	22.0%
Napier	Michael O'Brien	ALP	24.3%
Enfield	John Rau	ALP	24.5%
Cheltenham	Jay Weatherill	ALP	25.4%
Port Adelaide	Kevin Foley	ALP	25.7%
Playford	Jack Snelling	ALP	25.8%
Croydon	Michael Atkinson	ALP	26.0%
Taylor	Trish White	ALP	27.4%
Ramsay	Mike Rann	ALP	28.5%

Liberal seats (15)
Marginal
Stuart	Graham Gunn	LIB	0.6%
Unley	David Pisoni	LIB	1.1%
Heysen	Isobel Redmond	LIB	3.0%
Frome	Rob Kerin	LIB	3.4%
Waite	Martin Hamilton-Smith	LIB	4.0%
Morphett	Duncan McFetridge	LIB	5.4%
Fairly safe
Schubert	Ivan Venning	LIB	6.4%
Davenport	Iain Evans	LIB	6.4%
Finniss	Michael Pengilly	LIB	6.5%
Goyder	Steven Griffiths	LIB	9.1%
Kavel	Mark Goldsworthy	LIB	9.4%
Safe
Flinders	Liz Penfold	LIB	10.1% v NAT
Hammond	Adrian Pederick	LIB	12.0%
Bragg	Vickie Chapman	LIB	12.8%
MacKillop	Mitch Williams	LIB	22.2%

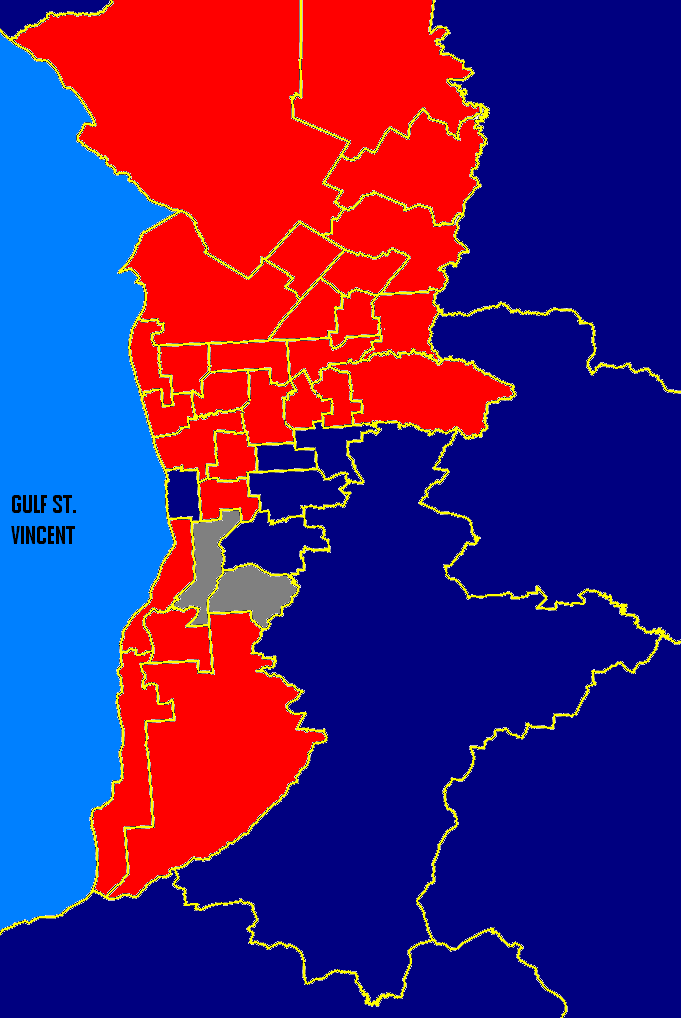
Metro SA (1.1 mil): Click here for boundary names.

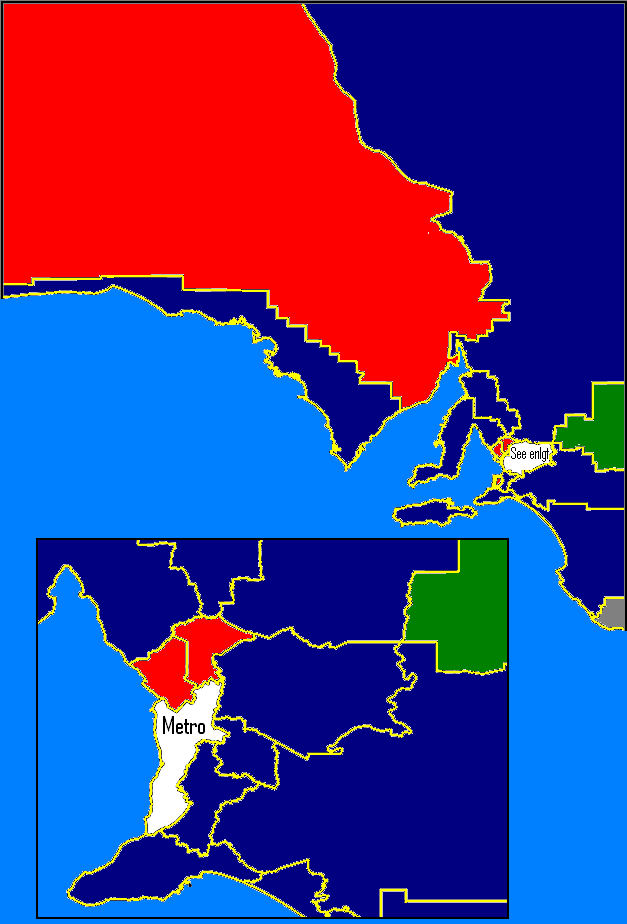
Rural SA (0.4 mil): Click here for boundary names.

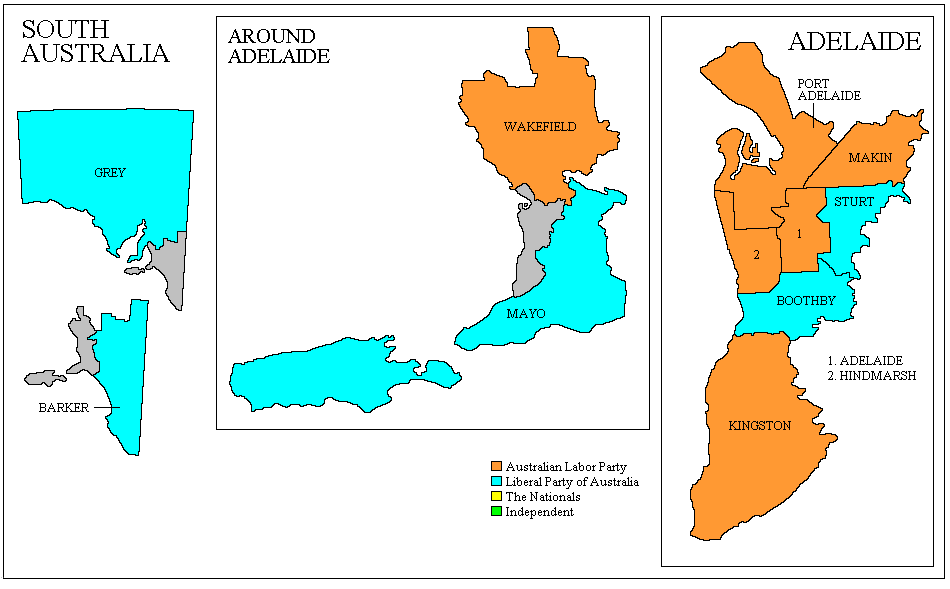
2007 federal election map containing South Australia's 11 of the 150 Australian lower house seats; six Labor and five Liberal. Kingston, Makin, and Wakefield were Liberal prior to the election. From July 2008 to June 2011, South Australia had five Labor, five Liberal, one Green, and independent Nick Xenophon in the 76 member upper house. Prior to the election, South Australia had six Liberal, five Labor, and one Democrat.

=== Legislative Council ===
South Australian state election, 18 March 2006 Legislative Council << 2002–2010 >>
Enrolled voters	1,055,347				
Votes cast	981,658		Turnout	93.0	−1.1
Informal votes	50,789		Informal	5.2	-0.2
Summary of votes by party
Party	Primary votes	%	Swing	Seats won	Seats held
Labor	340,632	36.6	▲+3.7	4	8
Liberal	241,740	26.0	▼−14.1	3	8
No Pokies	190,958	20.5	▲+19.2	2	2
Family First	46,328	5.0	▲+1.0	1	2
Greens	39,852	4.3	▲+1.5	1	1
Democrats	16,412	1.8	▼–5.5	0	1
One Nation	7,559	0.8	▼-1.0	0	0
HEMP	6,617	0.7	▼–0.2	0	0
National	6,237	0.7	▲+0.2	0	0
Shooters	5,991	0.6	New	0	0
Dignity for Disability	5,615	0.6	New	0	0
Other	22,928	2.5	*	0	0
Total	930,869			11	22

In the South Australian Legislative Council, Labor won 4 seats, the Liberals won 3 seats, both No Pokies member Nick Xenophon and his running mate Ann Bressington were elected and Family First and the Greens won a seat each. Almost 40 per cent of voters deserted the major parties for No Pokies Nick Xenophon and the minor parties; this percentage had been steadily increasing over time.

Labor received a 3.7 per cent swing, electing four councillors as in the previous election. Carmel Zollo, Bob Sneath, Russell Wortley and Ian Hunter were all elected, with 4.39 quotas. Bob Sneath was elected president of the Legislative Council.

On the other hand, the Liberal vote collapsed with a 14.1 per cent swing against the Liberal Party. Having received five councillors in 2002, at this election the Liberal Party had just three councillors elected. Rob Lucas, John Dawkins and Michelle Lensink were elected on 3.12 quotas.

Before the election, No Pokies member Nick Xenophon was popular with the media and in opinion polls, but he faced a tough campaign as a result of both major parties preferencing in favour of other independents and the minor parties. No Pokies received 20.5 per cent of the vote, yielding 2.46 quotas and thus seats for both Xenophon and his running mate Ann Bressington. Having been elected at the 1997 election with 2.9 per cent of the vote and other independent candidates at the 2002 election on 1.3 per cent of the vote (Xenophon being a sitting member at that election), the No Pokies ticket received a swing of 19.2 per cent.

The Family First Party's first member, Andrew Evans MLC, was elected in 2002. Family First won 5 per cent of vote with only a small swing of 0.98 per cent, allowing candidate Dennis Hood to be elected on preferences.

The SA Greens won 4.3 per cent of the upper house vote meaning a swing of 1.5 per cent, narrowly securing Mark Parnell for the last upper house seat on preferences. This is the first time The Greens have won a seat in South Australia. Having secured second spot on the ticket at this election, Sarah Hanson-Young was successful in gaining the first spot on the ticket at the 2007 federal election, which saw the Greens secure their first federal upper house seat in South Australia.

The Australian Democrats fell to just one seat in the Legislative Council held by Sandra Kanck, after Kate Reynolds was defeated in her bid for re-election after being appointed in 2003. The Democrats gained only 1.8 per cent after a 5.5 per cent swing against them. Kanck has since announced that she would not recontest her seat at the next election, placing serious clouds over the future of the party in the state.

Pauline Hanson's One Nation Party gained 0.8 per cent of the upper house vote and won none of the six lower house seats they contested. Their highest vote was 4.1 per cent in the district of Hammond, followed by 2.7 per cent in Goyder, and the other four hovering around 1 per cent.

Dignity for Disabled ran for the first time and won 0.6 per cent of the upper house vote; they won none of the 10 lower house seats they contested. Their best results were in Wright and Bright, with 2.4 per cent in each (506 and 492 votes respectively).

Labor-turned-independent Terry Cameron and Liberal-turned-independent Peter Lewis both failed in their bids for re-election.

== Aftermath ==
After the election, Rob Kerin vacated the position of opposition leader. The Liberals selected conservative Iain Evans (son of former politician Stan Evans) for the role, with moderate Vickie Chapman (daughter of former politician Ted Chapman) as deputy leader. The only other contestant had been conservative Isobel Redmond, who ran because she was concerned by some speculation that the Evans deal may have been stitched up by federal Liberal counterparts Christopher Pyne and Nick Minchin. Preferred premier ratings in July 2006 showed Rann on 71 per cent with Evans on 15 per cent. Only 27 per cent of Liberal Party supporters saw Evans as the preferred premier. Continuing low support for the new Liberal leadership saw Martin Hamilton-Smith replace Evans in April 2007, however this move saw Liberal support decline further to a three-year low according to an Advertiser poll conducted a month after the leadership change. Over half of polling respondents were unable to name the leader of the Liberal Party. This contradicted Newspolls quarterly polling indicating the Rann Labor government slipping to a two-party preferred figure of 57 per cent down four per cent, with a preferred premier rating of 52 per cent down 14 per cent for Rann and a first-time rating of 21 per cent for Martin Hamilton-Smith. Poll results also show Rann's satisfaction rating was below 60 per cent for the first time since coming to office at 58 per cent, with Hamilton-Smith receiving a 33 per cent satisfaction rate.

Previously unknown quantity Ann Bressington, elected on the back of Nick Xenophon's No Pokies popularity, proposed mainly conservative social policies such as raising the legal drinking age from 18 to 21, zero tolerance of illicit drugs, mandatory twice-annual drug tests of every school student over the age of 14 regardless of whether parents give their consent, and making the sale of "drug-taking equipment" illegal. However, she remained undecided on voluntary euthanasia, calling it "a personal struggle".

Setting a precedent, Sandra Kanck's pro-euthanasia speech which contained suicide methods was censored from the internet version of Hansard in August 2006 as a result of an upper house motion, with Labor, Family First, Nick Xenophon and Ann Bressington voting for, and the Liberals and SA Greens member Mark Parnell voting against. Despite this, the speech was published on a non-Australian website.

The state's budget was released on 21 September 2006. It included 1,600 public service job axings despite an election pledge of only 400, however none of the redundancies will be forced. It also included increases in some fees and charges such as victims of crime levies and Technical and Further Education (TAFE) charges. There were increases in funding for health, schools, police and prisons, and the Department of Public Prosecutions. The 2007–2008 budget released on 13 June 2007 saw additional spending on Transport, Energy and Infrastructure, Health, Families and Communities, and Justice portfolios such as transport initiatives including revitalisation of the rail network, commencement of the $1.7 billion Marjorie Jackson-Nelson Hospital to replace the Royal Adelaide Hospital, funding for mental health reform including the delivery of health services, and funding for new commitments to law and order policies.

No Pokies MP Nick Xenophon resigned from parliament in early October 2007 in a successful attempt to win a seat in the Australian Senate at the 2007 federal election, which according to the South Australian result, he retained 72 per cent of his 2006 vote, on 14.78 per cent. His replacement is his third candidate on the 2006 ticket, former Valuer-General John Darley, and was appointed by a joint sitting on 21 November 2007, where second candidate and upper house MP Ann Bressington also took the opportunity to accuse Xenophon of lacking integrity and suitability for federal parliament. Xenophon was re-elected to the Senate at the 2013 federal election with a record 25 per cent vote.

A record-breaking 13-hour Parnell-Bressington filibuster occurred in May 2008 in crossbench opposition to WorkCover cuts being passed by the major parties due to the increasing underfunded liability in the workers' compensation scheme.

Former Liberal Premier Rob Kerin resigned in November 2008, which triggered a 2009 Frome by-election. Independent Geoff Brock won the seat, reducing the Liberals to 14 of 47 seats. Brock's parliamentary presence would later be pivotal to the outcome of the 2014 election.

== See also ==
- Rann government
- Candidates of the South Australian state election, 2006
- Members of the South Australian House of Assembly, 2006-2010
- Members of the South Australian Legislative Council, 2006-2010
