= 2008 Parnell–Bressington filibuster =

The Parnell–Bressington filibuster is a record-breaking filibuster that occurred in the South Australian upper house, the Legislative Council, on 8 May 2008, involving SA Greens MLC Mark Parnell and No Pokies MLC Ann Bressington.

The South Australian workers compensation scheme known as WorkCover had been suffering an underfunded liability blowout since 2000, and by 2008 was nearing toward $1 billion. Legislation created to rectify the situation meant that injured workers payments would be cut by 10 percent after 13 weeks, 20 percent after 26 weeks, and end workers compensation payments and reverting to Centrelink benefits after two and a half years, if a person is deemed to have any capacity to work. Both the governing Labor Party and the main opposition Liberal Party were supportive of the changes, and with eight members each in the 22-member upper house, numbers were not an issue. The crossbench was made up of two Family First, two No Pokies, one Democrat, and one Green.

Considering themselves the opposition to this legislation, Parnell spoke for over eight hours, with Bressington speaking for another five hours. Allowing for lunch and dinner breaks, Parnell started at 11 am and finished at 11 pm. Bressington went from 11 pm to 4 am straight. Parnell's eight-hour contribution alone set a record filibuster in South Australian parliamentary history, and combined, set a record nationally in any Australian parliament. Parnell alone fell short of the record, Albert Gardiner's effort of 12 hours and 40 minutes in the Australian Senate in 1918. The world record is held by US Senator Strom Thurmond who filibustered against the Civil Rights Act of 1957 for 24 hours and 18 minutes.

Reported to be full at all times, the chamber heard Parnell present his own analysis and then related the submissions from the union movement and stories from injured workers. Some media outlets reported that Parnell read the entire WorkCover Bill into the public record. An examination of the official Hansard record of the debate shows that this is incorrect and that Parnell read none of the Bill during his speech. Parnell has also denied the charge of "filibuster", especially since his contribution did not delay the Bill and it still passed within the timeframe set by the Government. He described the bill as the most important he had dealt with since entering the parliament at the March 2006 state election:

I planned to speak for a long time. I didn't know how long it would be but in the end I cut it down. Had I gone through all the material that I could have, it would have been twice as long. But I knew I was pushing the boundaries of parliamentary convention. No-one goes for that long, it's not normally regarded as polite.

SA Unions Secretary Janet Giles, who resigned her position on the WorkCover board in protest to the changes, applauded the actions.

The voice of workers in this debate has been ignored and then silenced as the Premier tries to ram the WorkCover Bill through Parliament. If it wasn't for the cross bench members in the Upper House the impact this law will have on injured workers and their families would never have been considered.

The filibuster used up the last sitting day, however it did not substantially delay the passage of the Bill. The most substantial part of the debate – the Committee Stage – took place two weeks later (commencing on the next scheduled sitting day) and went for 3 days including the consideration of nearly 200 amendments. The Bill finally passed 14 votes to 4 with one pair, and one Family First abstaining. Parnell stated:

This is a sad day for South Australia... this is the worst piece of legislation I have seen in my time here. This is a horrible legacy the government is leaving this state.

Industrial Relations Minister Michael Wright said in reply:

These reforms... ensure the longevity of a healthy and economically viable workers compensation scheme for generations of workers to come.
