= Caldecote, Bedfordshire =

Caldecote or The Caldecotes refers to a pair of hamlets located in Bedfordshire, England:

- Lower Caldecote
- Upper Caldecote

== See also ==
- Caldecote (disambiguation)
