= Caldecott (surname) =

Caldecott is a surname. Notable people with the surname include:

- Alfred Caldecott (1850–1936), English philosopher
- Andrew Caldecott (1884–1951), British colonial administrator
- Andy Caldecott (1964–2006), Australian racing driver
- Ben Caldecott, British environmentalist
- John Caldecott (1800–1849), English astronomer
- Moyra Caldecott (1927–2015), British author
- Nick Caldecott (b. 1968), British stage actor
- Oliver Caldecott (1925–1989), co-founder of English publishing company Wildwood House
- Randolph Caldecott (1846–1886), British artist
- Stratford Caldecott (1953–2014), Catholic author, editor, publisher and blogger
- Thomas E. Caldecott (1878–1951), former mayor of Berkeley, California
- Thomas W. Caldecott (1914–1994), former California judge and politician
- Todd Caldecott (b. 1969), clinical herbalist and Ayurvedic practitioner

== See also ==
- Caldicott (surname)
- Stacy Coldicott (b. 1974), English former footballer
- Steph Coldicott, contestant on Big Brother (British TV series) series 4
