= Tammy Franks =

Australian politician

The Honourable Tammy Franks
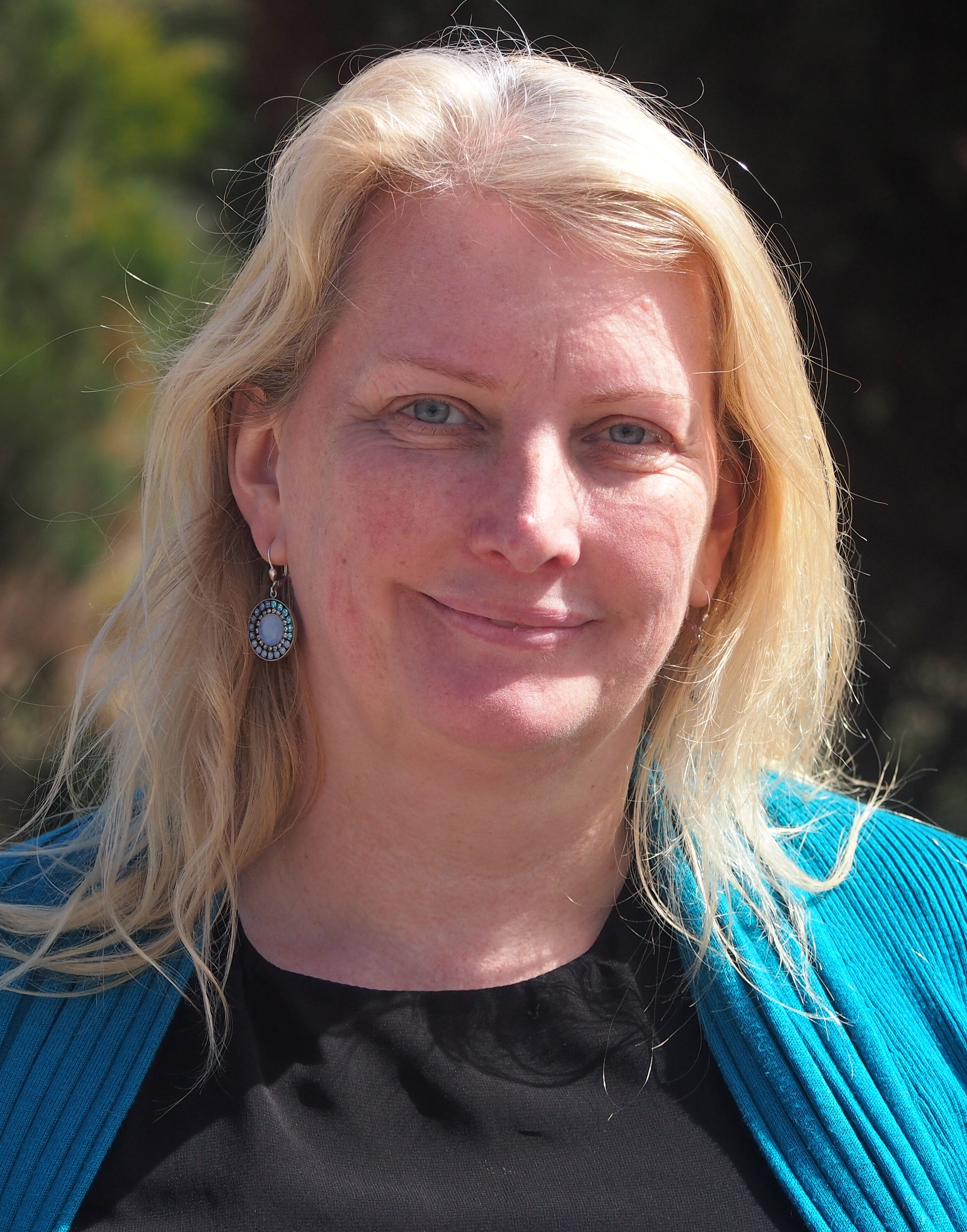

Member of the South Australian Legislative Council
- In office 20 March 2010 – 20 March 2026
- Preceded by: David Winderlich
- Succeeded by: Melanie Selwood

Personal details
- Born: Tammy Anne Franks; July 1968 (age 58)
- Party: Independent (since 2025)
- Other political affiliations: SA Greens (2006–2025); Democrats (formerly)
- Website: TammyFranks.org.au

Tammy Anne Franks (née Jennings; born July 1968) is an Australian politician who served in the South Australian Legislative Council for two terms from 2010 to 2026. Elected as a South Australian Greens, she resigned from the party in 2025 and sat as an Independent until the end of the term in 2026. Franks failed in an attempt to be elected as an Independent at the 2026 state election.

== Early life ==
Born in Dubbo and raised largely in seaside suburban Sydney, Franks completed her final year of high school at Parafield Gardens before attending the University of South Australia where she studied sociology, Australian Studies and Community Arts. Franks became heavily involved in university politics, media, and activism, campaigning against the closure of her Salisbury Campus of the University of South Australia, and was elected State President of the National Union of Students.

== Career ==
Then-prime minister Paul Keating famously told Franks, protesting in 1996, to "get a job".

Franks has since worked in community organisations such as Amnesty International and the YWCA and held such positions such as Policy Officer for the Mental Health Coalition of South Australia.

== Political career ==
Franks was the Higher Education and Youth Advisor for the Australian Democrats senator Natasha Stott Despoja in 1995 and undertook a secondment to the 'Yes' campaign for the Australian Republic Movement under the leadership of Malcolm Turnbull during the 1999 republic referendum campaign. In the 2004 Senate Election, Franks ran in South Australia for the Australian Democrats as their third candidate on the ticket.

Franks has been active in the South Australian Greens since 2006, serving two terms as State Convenor and undertaking the task of SA Election Campaign Committee Convenor for the 2007 federal election.

At the 2010 state election, the Greens achieved 6.6 percent of the statewide vote in the Legislative Council, an increase of 2.3 percent, resulting in Franks joining fellow Green Mark Parnell in the Upper House on the crossbench.

In September 2024, Franks said she would not contest the 2026 South Australian state election. In May 2025, she resigned from the South Australian Greens, citing tensions within the party, and reiterated that she still did not intend to contest the next election "at this point". However, in February 2026, she announced that she would run as an independent candidate for the Legislative Council in the election the following month.

At the 2026 South Australian Legislative Council election, running on an Independent Group ticket with Faith Coleman, they received 6,309 votes (0.6% of the primary vote which was equivalent to 10% of a quota).

Following her retirement from parliament at the 2026 State Election, Franks was granted the title The Honourable for life by the Governor.

== Controversies ==
=== Tax returns ===
It was reported in October 2011 that Franks had not lodged 10 tax returns since 2001, facing a maximum fine of $41,000.

Franks pleaded guilty on 28 October 2011 to ten counts of failing to lodge tax returns between 2001 and 2010, but later changed her plea to not guilty in March 2012. Franks said she had always paid tax, always provided a tax file number and did not owe the Australian Taxation Office any money, and that the failure to lodge was due to her belief that if she was owed money, she wouldn't be required to lodge a tax return. She also cited a combination of personal factors, including a "nasty divorce". Franks further claimed that when the ATO had asked her to file her returns, they gave her only six weeks to respond, and she had been unable to access each of her group certificates or joint bank accounts, as they were scattered in boxes throughout the house and in a locked shed of the marital home which was owned by her then-husband. She claimed she did not realise the ATO would accept statutory declarations in place of missing or lost group certificates.

Lawyers for the Commonwealth Director of Public Prosecutions, said Franks should be fined the maximum amount of $41,800.

The magistrate said she would consider the matter and review the now-lodged tax returns before imposing a sentence.

Franks was convicted on 8 October 2012. The magistrate rejected Franks's evidence that she had been unable to comply with a final notice because she could not get the relevant details. While the magistrate had great sympathy for her personal circumstances at the time she received the final notice, he found there were avenues available to her to obtain the information. The magistrate concluded Franks "did very little" to attempt to comply with the notice. Describing her as a "disorganised person" and "not an impressive witness", the Magistrate said Franks tended to blame others, including the Australian Taxation Office, for her situation. He said he preferred the evidence of an ATO employee, who contradicted Franks' evidence that she had asked for an extension of time in which to lodge the returns.

The Magistrates fined Franks $6,600 and ordered her to pay $7,500 court costs. A conviction was recorded because of the seriousness of the offending, but she will be able to keep her seat in parliament, because they were not indictable offences.

=== Sexual harassment ===
In 2021, Franks made allegations that Sam Duluk touched her inappropriately, which was denied by Duluk. Another politician, Connie Bonaros, also alleged that Duluk slapped her bottom. He was acquitted of assault charges.

== See also ==
- South Australian Greens
- 2010 South Australian state election
