= Robert Simms (politician) =

Australian politician

The Honourable Robert Simms MLC
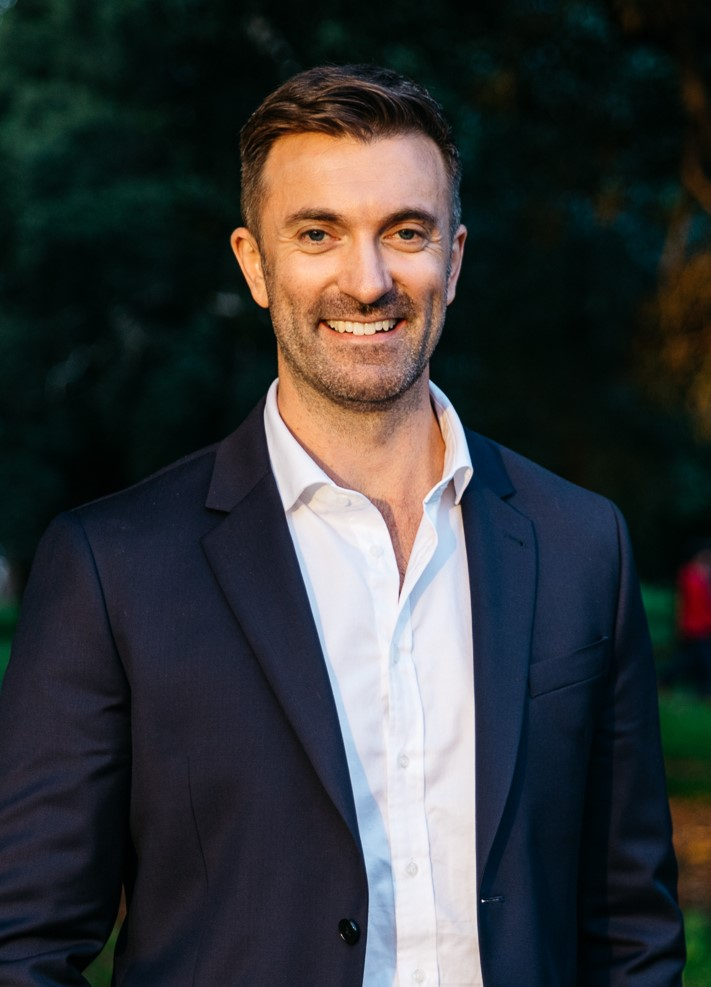

Member of the South Australian Legislative Council
- Incumbent
- Assumed office 4 May 2021
- Preceded by: Mark Parnell

Area Councillor for the City of Adelaide
- In office 22 November 2018 – 30 March 2021
- In office 2014 – 9 September 2015

Senator for South Australia
- In office 22 September 2015 – 2 July 2016
- Preceded by: Penny Wright

Personal details
- Born: 26 March 1984 (age 42) Yorkshire, England, UK
- Party: Greens South Australia
- Other political affiliations: Australian Democrats
- Education: Flinders University
- Occupation: Journalist, political advisor
- Profession: Barrister

Robert Andrew Simms (born 26 March 1984) is an Australian politician, representing the Greens South Australia. He was a Senator for South Australia from 2015 to 2016, an Area Councillor for the City of Adelaide from 2014 to 2015 and from 2018 to 2021. Since May 2021, he has been a member of the South Australian Legislative Council.

== Early life and education ==
Simms was born on 26 March 1984 in Yorkshire, England, the son of an English father and Australian mother originally from Broken Hill, New South Wales. The family moved to Australia in 1987 and settled in Adelaide, South Australia. Simms attended primary school in Flagstaff Hill before going on to Aberfoyle Park High School, where he was a member of the debating club and served on the student council.

He holds a Bachelor of Laws and Legal Practice (Honours), a Bachelor of Arts (majoring in politics and sociology) and a Graduate Certificate in Journalism. In 2008 Simms was admitted as a barrister and solicitor.

In 2015 he was part-way through a PhD in political philosophy at Flinders University, where he has also taught in the politics department.

== Early career ==
He has worked in the community sector as a policy advocate, serving on the boards of a number of community organisations, including the Youth Affairs Council and AIDS Council of South Australia.

He has also worked as a radio journalist and freelance writer.

== Political career ==
=== Democrats and council ===
Simms stood as a candidate for the Australian Democrats in the seat of Boothby at the 2004 federal election. He later stood for the Greens in Enfield at the 2010 state election, and Adelaide in the 2014 state election. He was elected as a City of Adelaide councillor in 2014, and was a co-convenor of the SA Greens in 2015. He resigned from the Council on 8 September 2015, to fill a vacancy caused by Penny Wright's resignation from the Senate.

=== Senate career ===
Simms was a Greens member of the Senate, representing the state of South Australia, from 22 September 2015 until his defeat at the 2016 election. Until the appointment of James Paterson to the Senate in March 2016, he was the youngest serving senator and the second-youngest sitting MP (after Wyatt Roy).

As a senator, Simms was the Greens parliamentary spokesperson on higher education, LGBT rights and marriage equality—portfolios previously held by Senators Lee Rhiannon and Janet Rice.

Simms was one of five openly LGBTI members in the Parliament of Australia and supports marriage equality in Australia.

=== State politics and return to city council ===
After his defeat in 2016, Simms was the Greens' candidate for Adelaide again at the 2018 state election, and received 12.6% of the first preference votes (third of four candidates).

He was re-elected to City of Adelaide Council in 2018.

=== Legislative Council ===
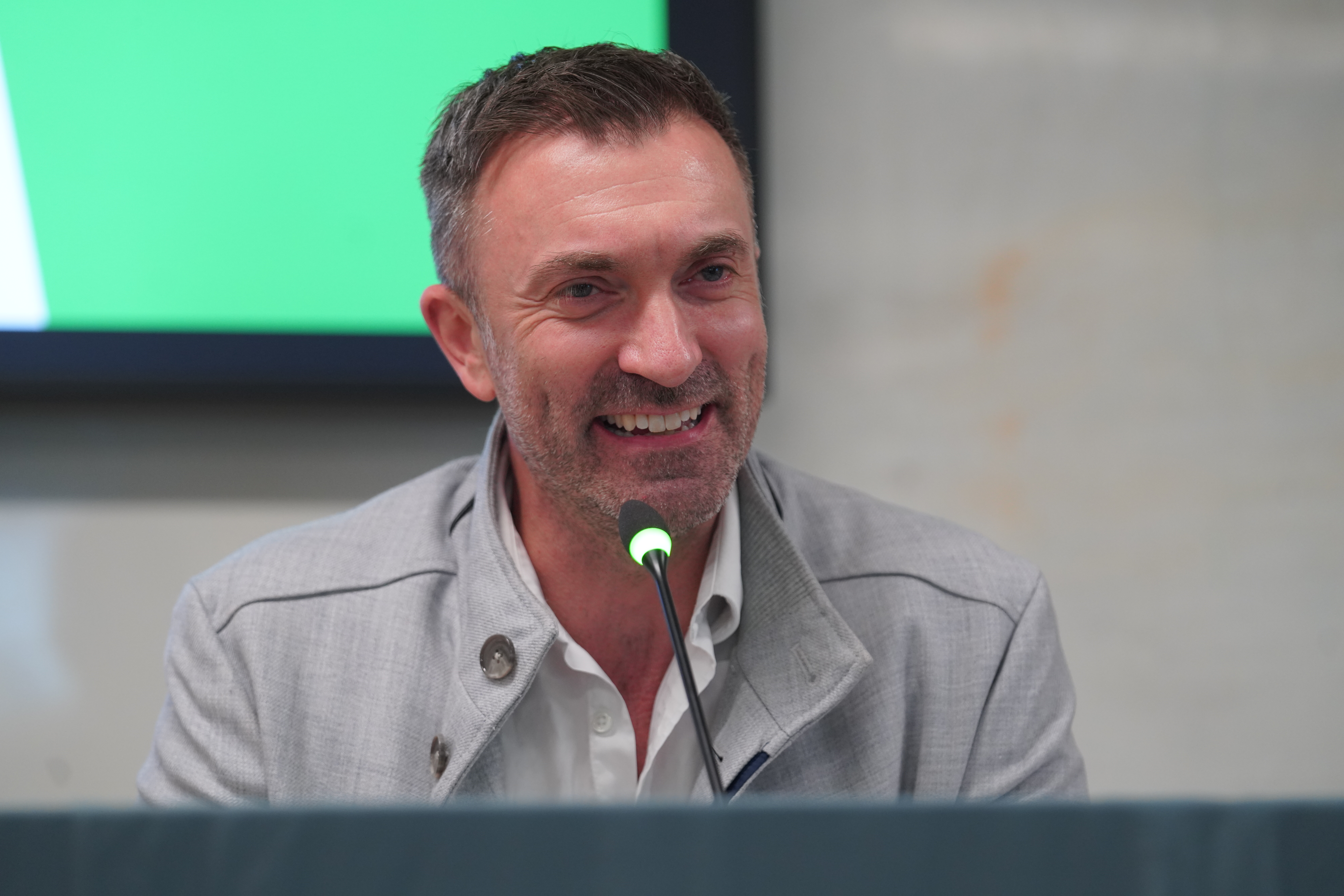
Simms at Flinders University in 2026

In May 2021, he resigned from council for the second time, to fill a casual vacancy caused by the resignation of Mark Parnell on the South Australian Legislative Council.

In March/April 2024, he has been active in the "Save the Cranker" movement to prevent historic live music pub The Crown & Anchor from being destroyed by developers. He introduced a motion to parliament to improve the state heritage laws, and attended a large rally on 28 April 2024. On 2 May 2024, it was reported that a watered-down version of his motion had passed the Legislative Council, in which MPs would be "encouraged" to make a submission to the State Commission Assessment Panel.
