= David Caldicott =

David Caldicott is an Irish emergency medicine consultant at the Emergency Department of the Calvary Hospital in Canberra, Australian Capital Territory. He was the convenor of the OzTox Collaboration, an independent multidisciplinary, hospital-based research group committed to a harm minimisation approach to illicit drug use.

Caldicott has been an outspoken critic of politicians supporting "zero-tolerance" and prohibitionist drugs policy, questioning the evidence of their efficacy in preventing morbidity and mortality from illicit substances.

== Career ==
Caldicott is one of the founding members of The List, a politically independent group of experts committed to maintaining the truth on illicit drug debate in the Australian media. The List promised to monitor the media on drugs policy issues in the run up to the Australian federal general election in 2007. He is on the expert database for the Australian Science Media Centre on issues of illicit drug use and medical response to disasters.

Caldicott is one of the designers and co-authors of the Designer Drug Early Warning System, and was the Project manager for the TRAUMATOX Project. Both of these studies are some of the largest of their kind ever conducted in Australia. He designed and piloted the Welsh Emergency Department Investigation of Novel Substances (WEDINOS) project in the UK, a unique program using regional emergency departments as sentinel monitoring hubs for the emergence and spread of novel illicit products. In addition to having a research interest in the acute health effects of illicit drugs, he is also co-author of the Bombs, Blasts and Bullets course, a primer for first responders approaching mass casualty incidents of terrorist origin.

Caldicott believes that drugs policy should not be guided by moral values, but by interventions known to have an effect on users’ behaviour. He was a strong advocate for a pill testing program in South Australia, as recommended by the 2002 Drugs Summit.
