= South Australian Greens =

Political party in South Australia

South Australian Greens Australian Greens SA
- Founded: 1995
- Headquarters: 7/291 Angas St; Adelaide SA 5000
- Ideology: Green politics Progressivism
- Political position: Left-wing
- National affiliation: Australian Greens
- Colours
- South Australian House of Assembly: 0 / 47
- South Australian Legislative Council: 2 / 22
- Australian Senate: 2 / 12 (SA seats)
- Local government councillors: 6 / 700

Website
- greens.org.au/sa

The South Australian Greens, officially known as the Australian Greens SA, is a green political party located in the Australian state of South Australia. It is a member of the federation of the Australian Greens party.

The party has four members in the federal and state parliaments: Sarah Hanson-Young and Barbara Pocock in the Senate; and Robert Simms and Melanie Selwood in the South Australian Legislative Council.

== Electoral history ==
Prior to 1995, a very small local Green party not connected to the emerging Australian Greens contested a number of State and Federal elections. This party was more or less non-functioning by the time Mark Parnell called the first meetings to establish a new Green Party in 1995. It took a number of attempts to get the new party off the ground, however a visit to Adelaide by Bob Brown in late 1995 provided the necessary impetus to register the new party.

The Australian Greens (SA) first ran in the 1996 federal election and the 1997 state election. In both elections they received around two percent of the statewide upper house vote.

Since that time, the Greens SA have steadily built up a support base at state and federal elections, partly due to the demise of the Democrats. The Greens SA now have two MLCs and two senators, with polling since the 2013 federal and 2014 state elections by Newspoll showing the Green vote consistently above 10 percent.

=== 2002 Labor defection ===
Kris Hanna, the member for Mitchell, was elected as a Labor member in 1997, but changed to The Greens in 2003. Hanna left the party in February 2006, citing constituents' wishes for him not to be bound to any party.

=== 2006 state election ===
At the 2006 state election, Environmental lawyer Mark Parnell became the first Green candidate to be elected in South Australia, securing a position in the Legislative Council on a primary vote of 4.3 percent. A vote of 6.5 percent was achieved in the House of Assembly, an increase of 4.1%.

The best lower house result was in the electoral district of Heysen, on a primary vote of 17.7 percent. Heysen was also the Democrats closest lower house win, coming as close as 1.9 percent at the 1997 state election on a primary vote of 29.2 percent, finishing at 48.1 percent after preferences.

=== 2007 federal election ===
Fourth on the 2006 state ticket, Sarah Hanson-Young was first on the ticket at the 2007 federal election, and became South Australia's first Greens Senator. She won the sixth and final South Australian Senate position with a primary vote of 6.5 percent. The strongest Green votes in the Senate came from Adelaide, Boothby and Mayo.

=== 2008 Mayo federal by-election ===
Sparked by the resignation of Liberal Party MP Alexander Downer, a Mayo by-election was held in 2008. Labor chose not to contest the by-election. Greens candidate Lynton Vonow finished second, on a primary vote of 21.35 percent amongst a field of 11 candidates, a swing of 10.39 percent, and finished on a final vote of 46.97 percent after the distribution of preferences, falling narrowly short of taking the seat from the Liberals.

=== 2010 state election ===
Prior to the 2010 state election, the Greens had gone from four to ten percent and above in state Newspolls. In the lower house, the vote increased to 8.1 percent, with the upper house vote to 6.6 percent which elected Tammy Jennings (now Tammy Franks).

=== 2010 federal election ===
At the 2010 federal election, polls showed a similar substantial increase. The Greens SA received a swing of 6.8 percent in South Australia for the Australian Senate, to finish with 13.3 percent of the statewide vote. Penny Wright was subsequently elected, joining Hanson-Young and 7 other Green Senators from July 2011.

=== 2013 federal election ===
Hanson-Young was re-elected at the 2013 federal election with a statewide primary vote of 7.1 percent. The Greens polled strongest in the seat of Mayo with over 14 percent of the primary vote.

=== 2014 state election ===
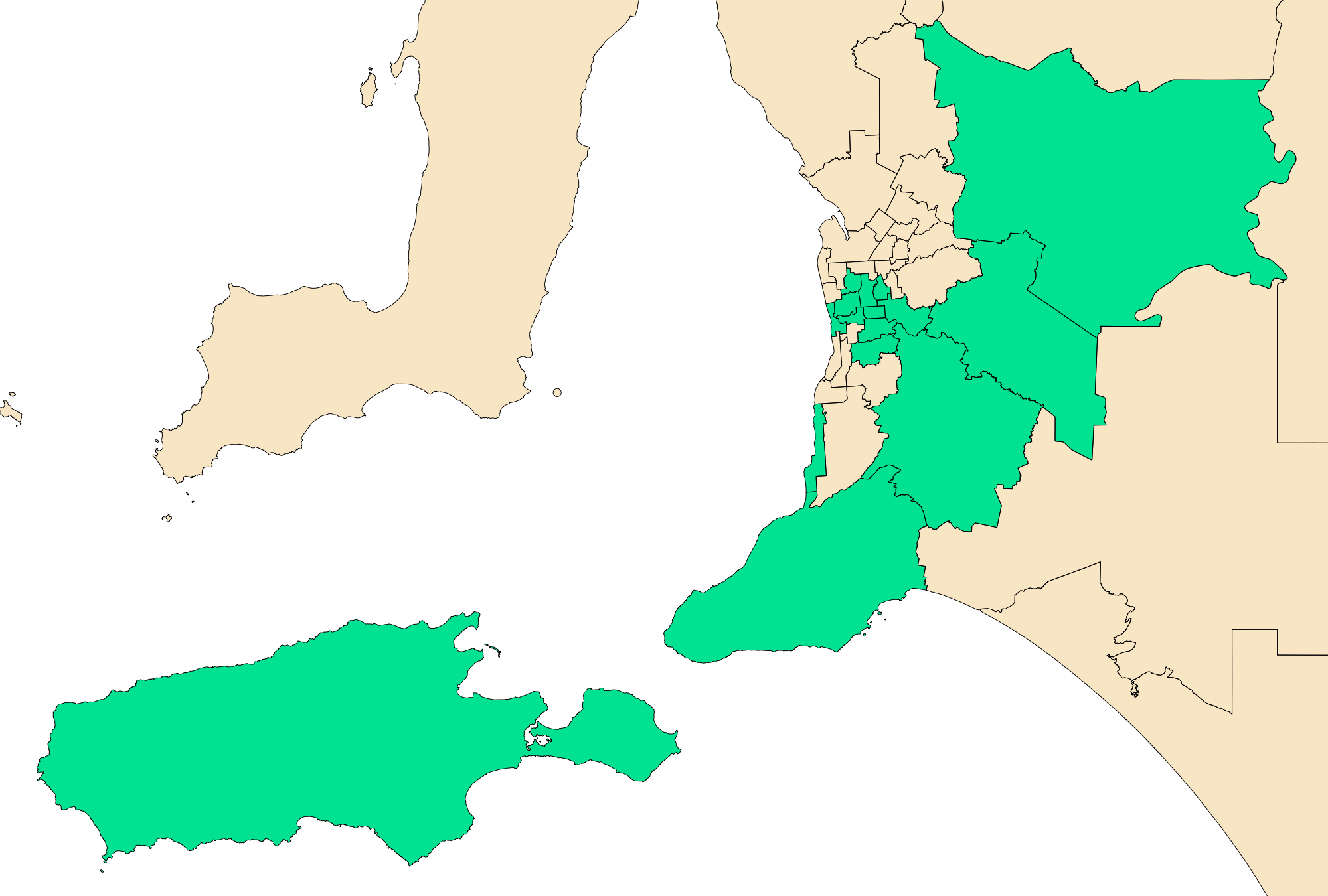
15 of 47 electorates in South Australia had a Green vote of above 10 percent at the 2014 state election. At the 2013 federal election, of 11 seats, the Green vote was above 10 percent in Adelaide, Boothby and Mayo.

Parnell was re-elected at the 2014 election with the upper house statewide primary vote at 6.5 percent. The lower house statewide primary vote was 8.7 percent.

Lynton Vonow contested the seat of Heysen for the Greens and came second after preferences with a 39 percent two-candidate preferred vote from a 19.7 percent primary vote. The Greens have consistently polled strongest in Heysen but with preferences overtook the Labor candidate. The Greens also polled well in seats such as Kavel and Davenport with primary votes over 15 percent.

=== 2015 Senate casual vacancy ===
Penny Wright resigned from the Senate due to family reasons in September 2015. Later that month, Robert Simms was appointed to the casual vacancy by a joint sitting of the Parliament of South Australia.

=== 2016 federal election ===
When Prime Minister Turnbull announced in March 2016 that a double dissolution would be taking place in May and an election in July, the party was forced for the first time to choose between their two senators, and preselected Sarah Hanson-Young to the number 1 preference on the Senate ballot, with Robert Simms at number 2. Only Hanson-Young was reelected, being assigned a 3-year term.

=== 2018 state election ===
Tammy Franks was re-elected to the Legislative Council with a statewide vote of 5.87% in the upper house.

=== 2019 federal election ===
Sarah Hanson-Young was re-elected to the Senate with a statewide upper-house swing of +5.03% and a total vote of 10.9% despite a modest swing of +3.4% in the lower house. The party polled strongest in the seat of Adelaide, where Barbara Pocock received 15.7% of first preference votes.

=== 2019 Cheltenham and Enfield by-elections ===
Steffi Medrow received 14.6% of first preferences with a swing of +8.3% in the 2019 Cheltenham state by-election.

Sebastian Konyn received 8.3% of first preferences in the 2019 Enfield state by-election, a result unchanged from Cassie Alvey's result in the 2018 election

=== 2021 casual Legislative Council vacancy ===
Robert Simms was preselected to contest the 2022 South Australian state election, but when Mark Parnell resigned from Parliament on 9 April, Simms was appointed to the state upper house on 4 May 2021. Tammy Franks became the parliamentary leader of the party.

=== 2022 state election ===
Simms was re-elected to the state's upper house with a statewide Legislate Council vote of 9% and a swing of +3.2%. Sean Cullen-MacAskill received 13.5% of first preference votes in the seat of Adelaide.

=== 2022 federal election ===
With Hanson-Young not requiring re-election in the middle of her six-year term, the party sought to double its upper-house representation. With a Senate swing of +0.99% and a total vote of 11.9%, Prof Barbara Pocock AM was elected as SA's newest senator. The party polled strongest in the Division of Adelaide, where Rebecca Galdies received 20.1% of first preference votes.

=== 2022 Bragg by-election ===
To fill the seat vacated by Vickie Chapman, the party preselected Jim Bastiras as the candidate for the Bragg by-election.

=== 2026 state election ===
With Robert Simms not requiring re-election, the party selected Melanie Selwood as their lead Legislative Council candidate. She was elected on a positive swing of +1.2% in the Legislative Council. Their second Legislative Council Candidate, Katie McKusker, came close to unseating Labor MLC Clare Scriven. She lost on the final count of statewide votes 44,019 votes to 54,070. The party gained a +1.3% swing in the House of Assembly, with Genevieve Dawson-Scott achieving 21.9% of first-preference votes in the Division of Heysen. In the Premier's seat, the Division of Croydon, Ruby Dolling finished second after preferences and made the 2CP count, achieving 26.0%.

== State election results ==
=== House of Assembly ===
Election	Seats won	Total votes	%	Position	Parliamentary Leader
1997	0 / 47	1,910	0.2%	Not in chamber	
2002	0 / 47	22,332	2.4%	Not in chamber	
2006	0 / 47	60,949	6.5%	Not in chamber	
2010	0 / 47	79,535	8.1%	Not in chamber	Mark Parnell
2014	0 / 47	88,600	8.7%	Not in chamber	Mark Parnell
2018	0 / 47	69,826	6.7%	Not in chamber	Mark Parnell
2022	0 / 47	99,534	9.1%	Not in chamber	Tammy Franks
2026	0 / 47	116,283	10.4%	Not in chamber	

=== Legislative Council ===
Election	Seats won	Total votes	%	Position	Convenor
1997	0 / 22	15,377	1.7%	Not in chamber	
2002	0 / 22	25,725	2.8%	Not in chamber	
2006	1 / 22	39,852	4.3%	Crossbench	
2010	2 / 22	63,358	6.6%	Crossbench	Mark Parnell
2014	2 / 22	65,215	6.5%	Crossbench	Mark Parnell
2018	2 / 22	61,610	5.9%	Crossbench	Mark Parnell
2022	2 / 22	98,324	9.0%	Crossbench	Tammy Franks
2026	2 / 22	116,048	10.2%	Crossbench	

View source data.

== Federal election results ==
View source data.

=== Senate Results ===
Election	Seats won (SA Seats)	Total votes	%
1987	0 / 12	8,102	0.9%
1990	0 / 12	19,499	2.1%
1993	0 / 12	15,467	1.6%
1996	0 / 12	19,441	2.0%
1998	0 / 12	20,895	2.2%
2001	0 / 12	33,439	3.46%
2004	0 / 12	63,881	6.60%
2007	1 / 12	65,322	6.49%
2010	2 / 12	134,287	13.30%
2013	2 / 12	73,612	7.09%
2016	1 / 12	62,345	5.88%
2019	1 / 12	119,470	10.91%
2022	2 / 12	134,908	11.95%
2025	2 / 12	150,148	12.90%

== Structure ==
=== State Council ===
The party's State Council meets once a quarter to deal with the party's administrative matters. The party also has a Policy and Campaigning Council, which includes representatives from branches and member action groups and meets every two months to shape the party's strategic priorities

=== Branches ===
Branches are where new members first meet other Greens, talk politics and policy, get involved in local campaigning and fundraising, and find out about what else is going on.

=== Member action groups ===
A variety of member action groups have been established by the State Council, which are directly accessible to all Greens members. Working groups perform an advisory function by developing policy, conducting issues-based campaigns, or by performing other tasks assigned by the State Council. These groups include:

- Indigenous Issues
- Animal welfare
- Greenhouse, energy and nuclear
- Queer Greens
- Young Greens

== Members of Parliament ==
=== Federal Parliament ===
Senator Sarah Hanson-Young (2007–present)

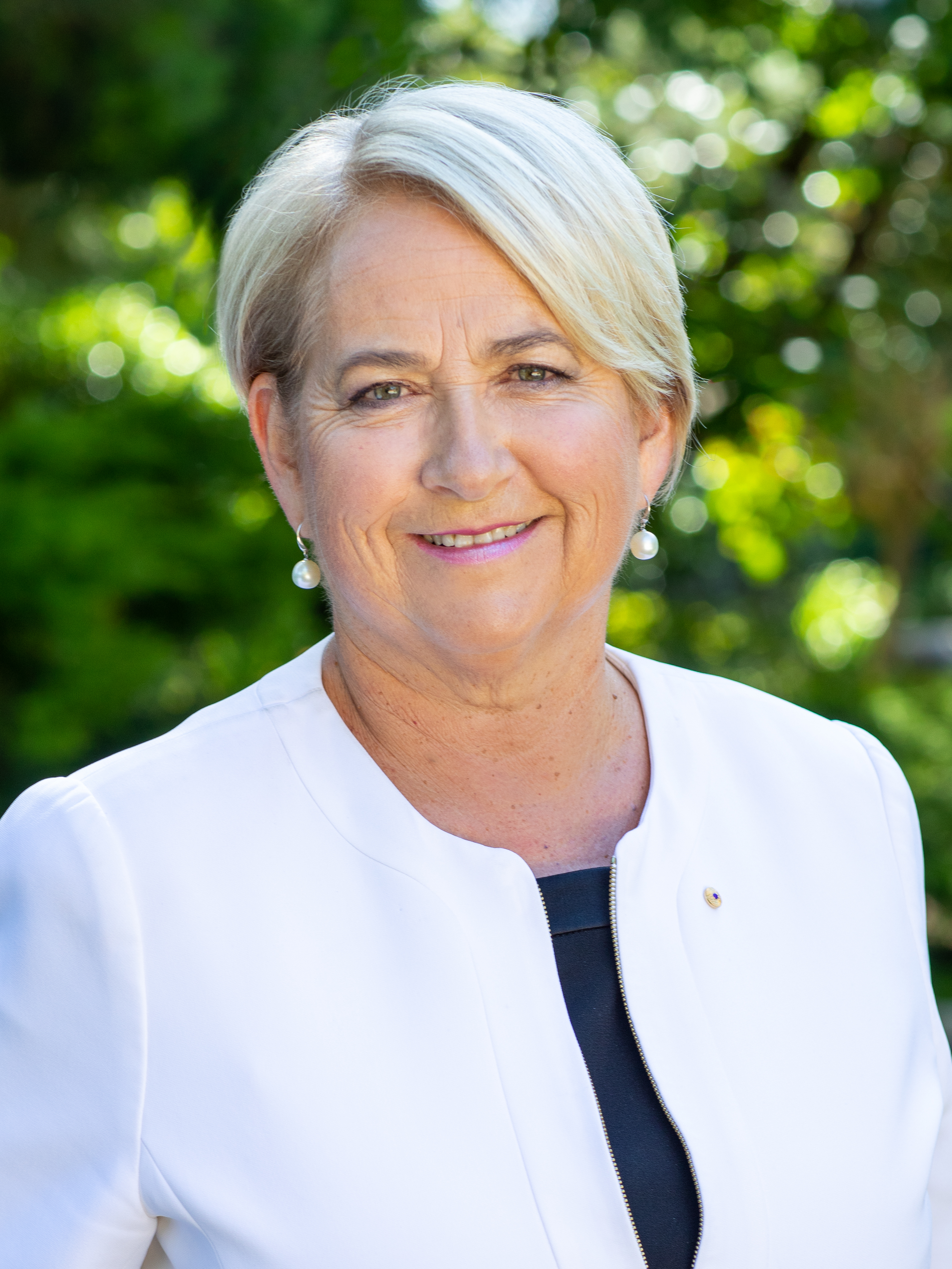
Barbara Pocock (2022–present) (Note: Pocock has announced her resignation and will not recontest again in the next federal election; she is seeing out the remainder of her term)

==== Former ====
- Senator Penny Wright (2011–2015)
- Senator Robert Simms (2015–2016)

=== State Parliament ===
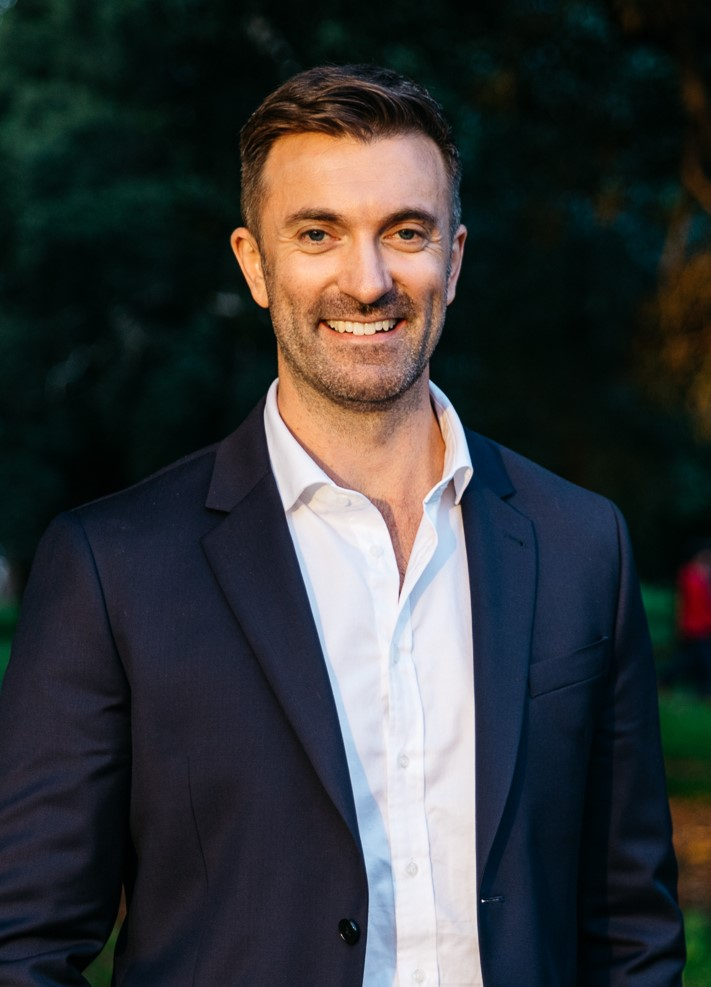
Robert Simms MLC (2021–present)

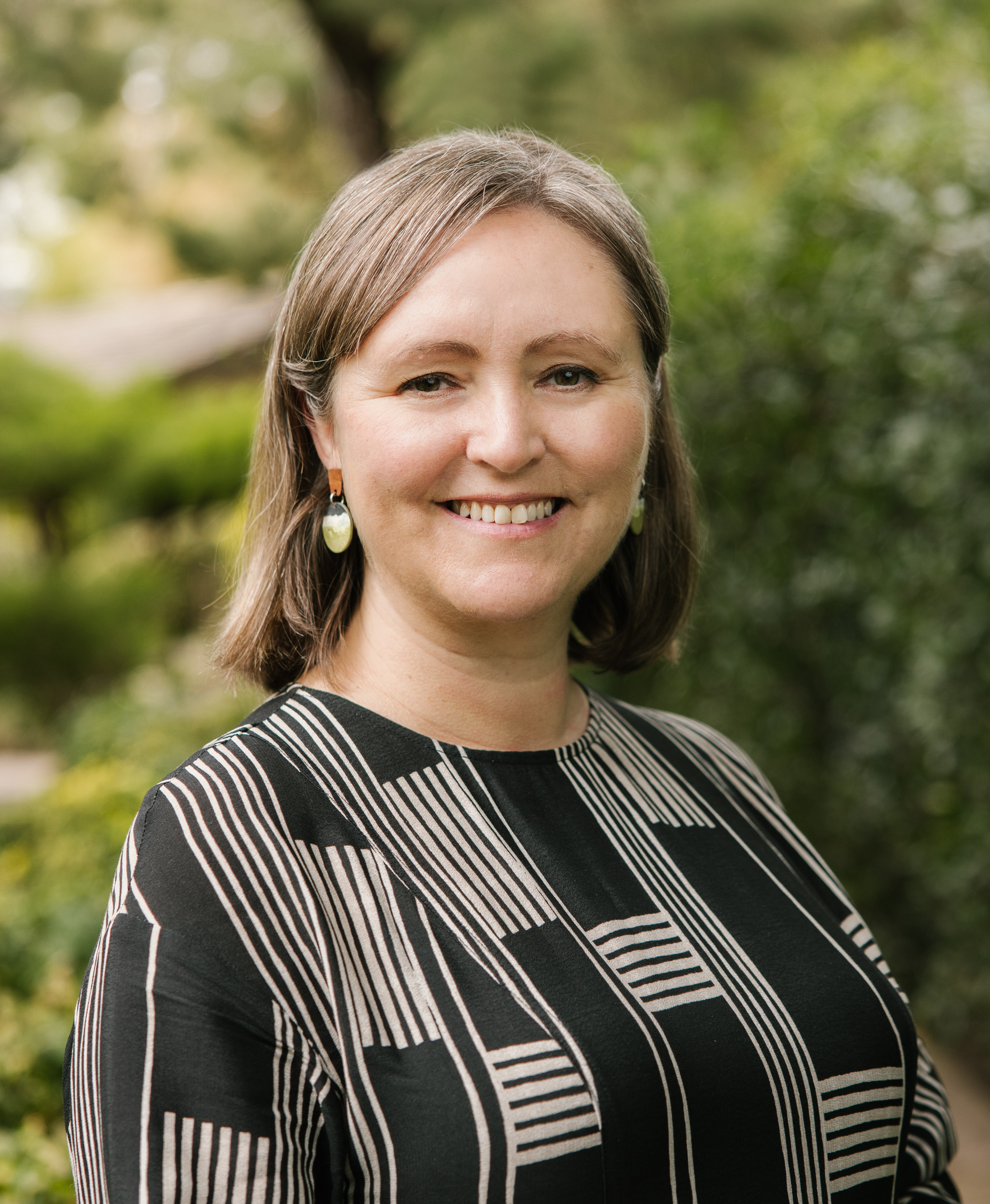
Melanie Selwood MLC (2026–present)

==== Former ====
- Kris Hanna, MLA for Mitchell (2003–2006) (Note: Hanna was elected in 1997 for the Labor Party, defected to the Greens from 2003–2006, then sat as an independent until 2010)
- Mark Parnell MLC (2006–2021)
- Tammy Franks MLC (2010–2025) (Note: Franks left the Greens in 2025, she sat as an independent until 2026)

== See also ==
- 2008 Parnell–Bressington filibuster
