= AEIDL =

AEIDL is the European Association for Innovation in Local Development (Association Européenne pour l'Innovation dans le Développement Local). It adopted this new name in June 2022, prior to which it was called the European Association for Information on Local Development/Association Européenne pour l'Information sur le Développement Local.

== History and objectives ==
It was founded in 1988 and is based in Brussels. As of 2020 its members are 31 individuals from 12 European Union countries who are involved in and expert on local development. Its activities include carrying out projects to promote local development, and implementing contracts for public authorities, especially at EU level. It employs approximately 20 staff. It is a non-profit organisation operating as a social enterprise and devotes its trading surpluses to the furtherance of its objectives, which are:

- the promotion of social Europe in a spirit of integration;
- the facilitation of transnational co-operation by means of exchanges, contacts and partnerships among persons and organisations;
- the creation, management and broadening of transnational networks of physical and legal persons, especially those having the object of economic, social and cultural development;
- activities of information, study and research, technical assistance, publishing and communication ancillary to the objects mentioned above.

== Activities ==
Its initial activity was to co-ordinate the European Network of Local Employment Initiatives (ELISE). For nearly 10 years (1992–2001) AEIDL animated the EU's main rural development programme, LEADER.

Its present workload includes:

- running the Rural Pact Support Office on behalf of the European Commission
- helpdesk of the European Evaluation Network for Rural Development and subsequently the EU CAP Network, as part of the RurEval and RURANET consortiums
- supporting the European Fisheries and Aquaculture Monitoring, Evaluation and Local Support Network (FAMENET, ex-FARNET, as part of the Devnet consortium)
- partner in over a dozen Horizon 2020 and Horizon Europe projects on Rural and Territorial Development as well as on Employment and Environment
- leading the European Migrant Entrepreneurship Network (EMEN) project, which operated three communities of practice in this field
- co-ordinating the Buying for Social Impact (BSI) project, which held a series of 15 conferences on socially responsible public procurement for public authorities and social enterprises, a handbook on which was later published.

From 2002 until July 2019 it provided technical assistance for transnationality in the European Social Fund, during and after the EQUAL Community Initiative. Until 2022 it ran the communication for the LIFE programme.

It was a founder member of ECOLISE, the European Network for Community-led Initiatives on Climate Change and Sustainability.

It is also active in social innovation and until November 2018 coordinated the Social Innovation Community (SIC) project.

In 2016 it launched an initiative to promote citizen-led initiatives in favour of refugees.

On 19–20 February 2014 it celebrated its 25th anniversary by organising the Reinventing Europe through Local Initiative event, which included a conference at the European Parliament and a publication summarising 25 promising local initiatives.
