= Electoral results for the district of Briggs =

South Australian district election results

This is a list of electoral results for the Electoral district of Briggs in South Australian state elections from 1985 to 1989.

== Members for Briggs ==
| Member | Party | Term |
|---|---|---|
| Mike Rann | Labor | 1985–1993 |

== Election results ==
=== Elections in the 1980s ===
1989 South Australian state election: Briggs
| Party | Candidate | Votes | % | ±% |
|---|---|---|---|---|
| Labor | Mike Rann | 10,112 | 55.4 | −1.2 |
| Liberal | Terry Stuart | 5,912 | 32.4 | +5.0 |
| Democrats | Colin Maas | 2,232 | 12.2 | +7.5 |
| Total formal votes | | 18,256 | 97.3 | +1.4 |
| Informal votes | | 514 | 2.7 | −1.4 |
| Turnout | | 18,770 | 94.7 | +1.9 |
Two-party-preferred result
| Labor | Mike Rann | 11,278 | 61.8 | −5.6 |
| Liberal | Terry Stuart | 6,978 | 38.2 | +5.6 |
| Labor hold | | Swing | −5.6 | |

1985 South Australian state election: Briggs
| Party | Candidate | Votes | % | ±% |
|---|---|---|---|---|
| Labor | Mike Rann | 9,142 | 56.6 | −4.4 |
| Liberal | Bernhard Buchner | 4,430 | 27.4 | −2.6 |
| Independent | David Whiting | 1,818 | 11.3 | +11.3 |
| Democrats | Anastasios Giannouklas | 766 | 4.7 | −4.3 |
| Total formal votes | | 16,156 | 95.9 | |
| Informal votes | | 687 | 4.1 | |
| Turnout | | 16,843 | 92.8 | |
Two-party-preferred result
| Labor | Mike Rann | 10,894 | 67.4 | +1.4 |
| Liberal | Bernhard Buchner | 5,262 | 32.6 | −1.4 |
| Labor hold | | Swing | +1.4 | |
