= Social exclusion =

Form of social disadvantage and relegation to the fringe of society

Social exclusion or social marginalisation/marginalization is a social disadvantage and relegation to the fringes of society. The term has been used widely in Europe and was first used in France in the late 20th century. In the EU context, the European Commission defines it as "a situation whereby a person is prevented (or excluded) from contributing to and benefiting from economic and social progress". It is used across disciplines including education, sociology, psychology, healthcare, politics and economics.

Social exclusion is the process in which individuals are blocked from (or denied full access to) various rights, opportunities and resources that are normally available to members of a different group, and which are fundamental to social integration and observance of human rights within that particular group (e.g. due process).

Alienation or disenfranchisement resulting from social exclusion can be connected to a person's social class, race, skin color, religious affiliation, ethnic origin, caste, educational status, childhood relationships, living standards, and/or appearance. Such exclusionary forms of discrimination may also apply to disabled people, minorities, for LGBTQ+ people, drug users, institutional care leavers, the elderly and the young. Anyone who appears to deviate in any way from the perceived norms of a population may thereby become subject to coarse or subtle forms of social exclusion.

The outcome of social exclusion is that affected individuals or communities are prevented from participating fully in the economic, social, and political life of the society in which they live. This may result in resistance in the form of demonstrations, protests or lobbying from the excluded people. Some writers see marginalised existence as "precarious", i.e. creating risks of exclusion, poverty and ill-health.

The concept of social exclusion has led researchers to conclude that in many European countries the impact of social disadvantages, which influence the well-being of all people, including those with special needs, has an increasingly negative impact.

Another way of articulating the definition of social exclusion is as follows:

Social exclusion is a multidimensional process of progressive social rupture, detaching groups and individuals from social relations and institutions and preventing them from full participation in the normal, normatively prescribed activities of the society in which they live.

In an alternative conceptualization, social exclusion theoretically emerges at the individual or group level on four correlated dimensions: insufficient access to social rights, material deprivation, limited social participation and a lack of normative integration. It is then regarded as the combined result of personal risk factors (age, gender, race); macro-societal changes (demographic, economic and labor market developments, technological innovation, the evolution of social norms); government legislation and social policy; and the actual behavior of businesses, administrative organisations and fellow citizens.

In some contexts social exclusion can have positive effects.

== Origins ==
Initially, it is possible to directly link exclusion and exploitation. Thus, anarchists, anti-globalization activists and, more generally, the far left, consider that social exclusion is produced by social exploitation.

== Individual exclusion ==
"The marginal man ... is one whom fate has condemned to live in two societies and in two, not merely different but antagonistic cultures....his mind is the crucible in which two different and refractory cultures may be said to melt and, either wholly or in part, fuse."

Social exclusion at the individual level results in an individual's exclusion from meaningful participation in society. An example is the exclusion of single mothers from the welfare system before welfare reforms of the 1900s. The modern welfare system is based on the concept of entitlement to the basic means of being a productive member of society both as an organic function of society and as compensation for the socially useful labor provided. A single mother's contribution to society is not based on formal employment, but on the notion that provision of welfare for children is a necessary social expense. In some career contexts, caring work is devalued and motherhood is seen as a barrier to employment. Single mothers were previously marginalized despite their significant role in the socializing of children due to views that an individual can only contribute meaningfully to society through "gainful" employment as well as a cultural bias against unwed mothers. When the father's sole task was seen as the breadwinner, his marginalization was primarily a function of class condition. Solo fatherhood brings additional trials due to society being less accepting of males 'getting away with' not working and the general invisibility/lack of acknowledgment of single fathers in society. Acknowledgment of the needs participatory fathers may have can be found by examining the changes from the original clinical report on the father's role published by the American Academy of Pediatrics in May 2004. Eight week paternity leave is a good example of one social change. Child health care providers have an opportunity to have a greater influence on the child and family structure by supporting fathers and enhancing a father's involvement.

More broadly, many women face social exclusion. Moosa-Mitha discusses the Western feminist movement as a direct reaction to the marginalization of white women in society. Women were excluded from the labor force and their work in the home was not valued. Feminists argued that men and women should equally participate in the labor force, in the public and private sector, and in the home. They also focused on labor laws to increase access to employment as well as to recognize child-rearing as a valuable form of labor. In some places today, women are still marginalized from executive positions and continue to earn less than men in upper management positions.

Another example of individual marginalization is the exclusion of individuals with disabilities from the labor force. Grandz discusses an employer's viewpoint about hiring individuals living with disabilities as jeopardizing productivity, increasing the rate of absenteeism, and creating more accidents in the workplace. Cantor also discusses employer concern about the excessively high cost of accommodating people with disabilities. The marginalization of individuals with disabilities is prevalent today, despite the legislation intended to prevent it in most Western countries, and the academic achievements, skills and training of many disabled people.

The Yogyakarta Principles require that the states and communities abolish any stereotypes about LGBT people as well as stereotyped gender roles.

"Isolation is common to almost every vocational, religious or cultural group of a large city. Each develops its own sentiments, attitudes, codes, even its own words, which are at best only partially intelligible to others."

The popularity of a TikTok trend in which men call their friends to say good night has been attributed to a widespread longing for platonic connection. In a 2021 US survey, less than one-third of men said they had a private conversation, involving sharing feelings with a friend, within the previous week. Just under one-half of women reported doing so.

== Community exclusion ==
Many communities experience social exclusion, such as racial (e.g. black or Romani), caste (e.g. untouchables or dalits in some regions in India), and economic communities.

One example is the Aboriginal community in Australia. The marginalization of Aboriginal communities is a product of colonization. As a result of colonialism, Aboriginal communities lost their land, were forced into destitute areas, lost their sources of livelihood, were excluded from the labor market and were subjected to widespread unpunished massacres. Additionally, Aboriginal communities lost their culture and values through forced assimilation and lost their rights in society. Today, various Aboriginal communities continue to be marginalized from society due to the development of practices, policies and programs that, according to J. Yee, "met the needs of white people and not the needs of the marginalized groups themselves". Yee also connects marginalization to minority communities, when describing the concept of whiteness as maintaining and enforcing dominant norms and discourse. Poor people living in run-down council estates and areas with high crime can be locked into social deprivation.

== Contributors ==
Social exclusion has many contributors. Major contributors generating social exclusion include race, income, employment status, social class, geographic location; personal habits, appearance, or interests (i.e., a favorite hobby, sports team, or music genre); education, religion, and political affiliation.

=== Global and structural ===
Globalization (global capitalism), immigration, social welfare, and policy are broader social structures that have the potential to contribute negatively to one's access to resources and services, resulting in the social exclusion of individuals and groups. Similarly, increasing use of information technology and the company outsourcing have contributed to job insecurity and a widening gap between the rich and the poor. Globalization sets forth a decrease in the role of the state with an increase in support from various "corporate sectors resulting in gross inequalities, injustices and marginalization of various vulnerable groups" (p. 1).

Certain language and the meaning attached to language can cause universalizing discourses that are influenced by the Western world, which is what describes by Sewpaul as the "potential to dilute or even annihilate local cultures and traditions and to deny context-specific realities". What this is implying is that the effect of dominant global discourses can cause individual and cultural displacement, as well as sex safety are jeopardized. Insecurity and fear of an unknown future and instability can result in displacement, exclusion, and forced assimilation into the dominant group. For many, it further pushes them to the margins of society or enlists new members to the outskirts because of global capitalism and dominant discourses.

Immigration can provide additional barriers to social inclusion. Factors such as experiences of discrimination, homesickness, and sense of belonging to the host society all play a role in the higher loneliness amongst migrants than their native counter parts. Low socioeconomic status, poor health, and barriers to healthcare also play large roles in the social stratification of migrants.

Welfare states and social policies can also exclude individuals from basic necessities and support programs. Welfare payments were proposed to assist individuals in accessing a small amount of material wealth (Young, 2000). Young (2000) further discusses how "the provision of the welfare itself produces new injustice by depriving those dependent on it of rights and freedoms that others have...marginalization is unjust because it blocks the opportunity to exercise capacities in socially defined and recognized way" (p. 41). There is the notion that by providing a minimal amount of welfare support, an individual will be free from marginalization. In fact, welfare support programs further lead to injustices by restricting certain behaviour, as well the individual is mandated to other agencies. The individual is forced into a new system of rules while facing social stigma and stereotypes from the dominant group in society, further marginalizing and excluding individuals (Young, 2000). Thus, social policy and welfare provisions reflect the dominant notions in society by constructing and reinforcing categories of people and their needs. It ignores the unique, subjective human essence, further continuing the cycle of dominance.

=== Unemployment ===
Whilst recognising the multi-dimensionality of exclusion, policy work undertaken in the European Union focused on unemployment as a key cause of, or at least correlating with, social exclusion. This is because, in modern societies, paid work is not only the principal source of income with which to buy services but is also the fount of individuals' identity and feeling of self-worth. Most people's social networks and a sense of embeddedness in society also revolve around their work. Many of the indicators of extreme social exclusion, such as poverty and homelessness, depend on monetary income which is normally derived from work. Social exclusion can be a possible result of long-term unemployment, especially in countries with weak welfare safety nets. Much policy to reduce exclusion thus focuses on the labour market:

- On the one hand, to make individuals at risk of exclusion more attractive to employers, i.e. more "employable".
- On the other hand, to encourage (and/or oblige) employers to be more inclusive in their employment policies.

The EU's EQUAL Community Initiative investigated ways to increase the inclusiveness of the labor market. Work on social exclusion more broadly is carried out through the Open Method of Coordination (OMC) among the Member State governments. The United Nations Sustainable Development Goal 10 is also an example of global initiatives aimed at promoting social inclusion for all by 2030.

=== Politics ===
Viewpoint discrimination and the political cordon sanitaire can contribute to social exclusion.

Mullaly (2007) describes how "the personal is political" and the need for recognizing that social problems are indeed connected with larger structures in society, causing various forms of oppression amongst individuals resulting in marginalization. It is also important for the social worker to recognize the intersecting nature of oppression. A non-judgmental and unbiased attitude is necessary on the part of the social worker. The worker may begin to understand oppression and marginalization as a systemic problem, not the fault of the individual.

Working under an anti-oppression perspective would then allow the social worker to understand the lived, subjective experiences of the individual, as well as their cultural, historical and social background. The worker should recognize the individual as political in the process of becoming a valuable member of society and the structural factors that contribute to oppression and marginalization (Mullaly, 2007). Social workers must take a firm stance on naming and labeling global forces that impact individuals and communities who are then left with no support, leading to marginalization or further marginalization from the society they once knew (George, P, SK8101, lecture, October 9, 2007).

=== Religion ===
Some religious traditions recommend excommunication of individuals said to deviate from religious teaching, and in some instances shunning by family members. Some religious organizations permit the censure of critics.

Across societies, individuals and communities can be socially excluded based on their religious beliefs. Social hostility against religious minorities and communal violence occur in areas where governments do not have policies restricting the religious practise of minorities. A study by the Pew Research Center on international religious freedom found that 61% of countries have social hostilities that tend to target religious minorities. The five highest social hostility scores were for Pakistan, India, Sri Lanka, Iraq, and Bangladesh. In 2015, Pew published that social hostilities declined in 2013, but harassment of Jews increased.

"I h8 Jews", written in the sand on a New Jersey beach and texted to a group chat of high school students, led to a state investigation described in the New York Times. The article noted that "schools often treat bias incidents as one-offs, minimizing or even ignoring them", according to a 2019 report by the Southern Poverty Law Center. Anti-Jewish hate crimes in the US were the largest category of hate crimes between October 2023 and December 2023, at 971 crimes. The shift of anti-Jewish hate from fringe to mainstream has been described as 'normalization of antisemitism'.

Parts of 2024 Summer Olympics opening ceremony were criticized by some people as divisive, due to singling out one particular religion (Christianity).

== Areas of Social Exclusion ==
The multidimensional nature of social exclusion manifests in different areas, influencing life scenarios that are often interconnected. Although there is no unifying consensus on what these dimensions or areas are, they include economic, educational or training, social, cultural, health or socio-health, personal, citizenship and participation, and spatial or housing. Each area presents characteristics, factors, and features that allow us to determine the existence of social exclusion, which serve as indicators to prevent such situations or to improve the well-being and quality of life of society.

== Consequences ==
=== Health ===
In gay men, results of psycho-emotional damage from marginalization from a heteronormative society include suicide and drug addiction.

Scientists have been studying the impact of racism on health. Amani Nuru-Jeter, a social epidemiologist at the University of California, Berkeley and other doctors have been hypothesizing that exposure to chronic stress may be one way racism contributes to health disparities between racial groups. Arline Geronimus, a research professor at the University of Michigan Institute for Social Research and a professor at the School of Public Health, and her colleagues found that psychosocial stress associated with living in extreme poverty can cause early onset of age-related diseases. The 2015 study titled, "Race-Ethnicity, Poverty, Urban Stressors, and Telomere Length in a Detroit Community-based Sample" was conducted to determine the impact of living conditions on health and was performed by a multi-university team of social scientists, cellular biologists and community partners, including the Healthy Environments Partnership (HEP) to measure the telomere length of poor and moderate-income people of White, African-American and Mexican race.

In 2006, there was research focused on possible connections between exclusion and brain function. Studies published by both the University of Georgia and San Diego State University found that exclusion can lead to diminished brain functioning and poor decision-making. Such studies corroborate with earlier beliefs of sociologists. The effect of social exclusion has been hypothesized in various past research studies to correlate with such things as substance abuse and addiction, and crime.

=== Economics ===
The problem of social exclusion is usually tied to that of equal opportunity, as some people are more subject to such exclusion than others. Marginalisation of certain groups is a problem in many economically more developed countries where the majority of the population enjoys considerable economic and social opportunities.

== In philosophy ==
The marginal and the processes of marginalisation attract specific interest in postmodern and post-colonial philosophy and social studies. Postmodernism questions the "center" about its authenticity, and postmodern sociology and cultural studies research marginal cultures, behaviours, societies, the situations experienced by marginalized or "sidelined" individuals.

== Social inclusion ==
Social inclusion is the converse of social exclusion. As the World Bank states, social inclusion is the process of improving the ability, opportunity, and worthiness of people, disadvantaged based on their identity, to take part in society. The World Bank's 2019 World Development Report on The Changing Nature of Work suggests that enhanced social protection and better investments in human capital improve equality of opportunity and social inclusion. Social inclusion can be measured individually.

Ministerial roles concerned with social inclusion have been appointed, and special units established, in a number of jurisdictions around the world:

- The first Minister for Social Inclusion was Premier of South Australia Mike Rann, who took the portfolio in 2004. Based on the UK's Social Exclusion Unit, established by Prime Minister Tony Blair in 1997, Rann established the Social Inclusion Initiative in 2002. It was headed by Monsignor David Cappo and was serviced by a unit within the department of Premier and Cabinet. Cappo sat on the executive committee of the South Australian Cabinet and was later appointed Social Inclusion Commissioner with wide powers to address social disadvantage. Cappo was allowed to roam across agencies given that most social disadvantage has multiple causes necessitating a "joined up" rather than a single agency response. The Initiative drove a big investment by the South Australian Government in strategies to combat homelessness, including establishing Common Ground, building high quality inner city apartments for "rough sleeping" homeless people, the Street to Home initiative and the ICAN flexible learning program designed to improve school retention rates. It also included major funding to revamp mental health services following Cappo's "Stepping Up" report, which focused on the need for community and intermediate levels of care and an overhaul of disability services. In 2007, Australian Prime Minister Kevin Rudd appointed Julia Gillard as the nation's first Social Inclusion Minister.
- In Japan, the concept and term "social inclusion" went through a number of changes over time and eventually became incorporated in community-based activities under the names hōsetsu (包摂) and hōkatsu (包括), such as in the "Community General Support Centres" (地域包括支援センター, chiiki hōkatsu shien sentā) and "Community-based Integrated Care System" (地域包括ケアシステム, chiiki hōkatsu kea shisutemu).

Oher examples addressing social inclusion include social workers who undertake reflexive work to raise the consciousness, empower, and understand the lived subjective realities of individuals living in a fast-paced world, where fear and insecurity constantly subjugate the individual from the collective whole, perpetuating the dominant forces, while silencing the oppressed. Some individuals and groups who are not professional social workers build relationships with marginalized persons by providing relational care and support, for example, through homeless ministry. These relationships validate the individuals who are marginalized and provide them with meaningful contact with the mainstream. Organisations like Muslim Hikers, Muslim Cyclists and Muslim Runners in the UK recognise that certain ethnic minorities have not historically been engaged in these types of leisure activity and work to promote wider inclusion and access to the mental and physical health benefits which they represent.

== In law ==
There are countries, Italy for example, that have a legal concept of social exclusion. In Italy, "esclusione sociale" is defined as poverty combined with social alienation, by the statute n. 328 (11-8-2000), that instituted a state investigation commission named "Commissione di indagine sull'Esclusione Sociale" (CIES) to make an annual report to the government on legally expected issues of social exclusion.

The Vienna Declaration and Programme of Action, a document on international human rights instruments affirms that "extreme poverty and social exclusion constitute a violation of human dignity and that urgent steps are necessary to achieve better knowledge of extreme poverty and its causes, including those related to the program of development, in order to promote the human rights of the poorest, and to put an end to extreme poverty and social exclusion and promote the enjoyment of the fruits of social progress. It is essential for States to foster participation by the poorest people in the decision making process by the community in which they live, the promotion of human rights and efforts to combat extreme poverty."

== Empirical measurements of social exclusion ==
Alongside the more theoretical studies on social exclusion, there are now a number of attempts to investigate and measure it empirically, especially within the European Union. Hilary Silver published an extensive review of these empirical studies in 2007, which will serve as the basis for describing its findings here.

== International human rights law ==
The Vienna Declaration and Programme of Action affirms that extreme poverty and social exclusion constitute a violation of human dignity and that immediate action is needed to better understand the phenomenon of extreme poverty and its causes, to end extreme poverty and social exclusion, and to better ensure that all people may have the enjoyment of the fruits of social progress.

== Digital capital and social exclusion ==
In contemporary sociology, social exclusion is increasingly linked to the distribution of "digital capital". According to researchers Massimo Ragnedda and Maria Laura Ruiu, digital exclusion goes beyond mere access to hardware, representing a "third digital divide" where individuals cannot convert online activities into offline social, economic, and political benefits. This perspective suggests that digital capital consists of both internalized skills and external resources that, when unevenly distributed, reinforce existing social marginalization by limiting access to essential digital services, labor markets, and social networks. Expanding on this, Ragnedda, Ruiu, and Addeo (2022) introduced the concept of the "Inequality Loop" to describe how social and digital inequalities reinforce each other over time. In this self-reinforcing cycle, an individual's initial social position determines their level of digital capital; this capital then dictates the quality of their digital engagement and the tangible benefits they can extract from it. Ultimately, these digital outcomes feed back into their social position, either improving it or, in the case of marginalized groups, further entrenching their social exclusion. This "loop" suggests that digital inequality is not a static gap but a dynamic process that actively reproduces and amplifies traditional social stratifications.

== See also ==
- Ageism
- Antisemitism
- Apartheid
- Basic income
- Blacklisting
- Cancel culture
- Closure (sociology)
- Cordon sanitaire (international relations)
- Distribution of wealth
- Exclusionism
- Guaranteed minimum income
- Environmental racism
- Hate speech
- Heterosexism
- Homophobia
- In-group favoritism
- Isolation to facilitate abuse
- Korenizatsiia
- List of banned political parties
- Lumpenproletariat
- Ostracism
- Othering
- Peer pressure
- Poverty
- Racism
- Relational mobility
- Reserve army of labour
- Second-class citizen
- Sex segregation
- Silent treatment
- Social alienation
- Social control
- Social death
- Social firm
- Social invisibility
- Social rejection
- Social stigma
- Social vulnerability
- The Disinformation Project
- Transport divide
- Vienna Declaration and Programme of Action
- Yogyakarta Principles
- Youth exclusion

== Bibliography ==
- Giddens A, Applebaum RP, Carr D, Duneier M, Mitchell GA (2011). Introduction to Sociology (Seventh ed.).
- Deleuze G (1980). A Thousand Plateaus.
- Giddens A (2009). Introduction to Sociology. New York: W.W. Norton.
- Karl Marx, Economic and Philosophical Manuscripts of 1844
- The globalized city: economic restructuring and social polarization in European cities (Reprinted ed.). Oxford: Oxford University Press. 2005. ISBN 978-0-19-926040-9.
- Mullaly B (2007). "Oppression: The focus of structural social work.". In Mullaly B (ed.). The new structural social work. Don Mills: Oxford University Press. pp. 252–286.
- Power A, Wilson WJ (2000). Social Exclusion and the Future of Cities. London: Centre for Analysis of Social Exclusion, London School of Economics.
- Rawls J (2005). A theory of justice (Orig., reprint ed.). Cambridge, Mass.: Belknap Press. ISBN 978-0-674-01772-6.
- Sakamoto I, Pitner RO (2005). "Use of critical consciousness in anti-oppressive social work practice: disentangling power dynamics at personal and structural levels". British Journal of Social Work. 35 (4): 435–452. doi:10.1093/bjsw/bch190.
- Sewpaul V (April 2006). "The global–local dialectic: Challenges for African scholarship and social work in a post-colonial world". British Journal of Social Work. 36 (3): 419–434. doi:10.1093/bjsw/bcl003.
- Silver H (1994). "Social Exclusion and Social Solidarity: Three Paradigms". International Labour Review. 133 (5–6): 531–578.
- University of Georgia (2006, November 9). Social Exclusion Changes Brain Function And Can Lead To Poor Decision-making. ScienceDaily. Retrieved February 29, 2008, from http://www.sciencedaily.com /releases/2006/11/061108154256.htm
- URSPIC: An EU Research Project to measure impacts of urban development projects on social exclusion
- van Parijs P (2003). Real freedom for all: what (if anything) can justify capitalism? (Repr ed.). Oxford: Clarendon Press. ISBN 978-0-19-829357-6.
- Yee JY, Dumbrill GC (2003). "Whiteout: Looking for Race in Canadian Social Work Practice". In Al-Krenawi A, Graham JR (eds.). Multicultural Social Work in Canada: Working with Diverse Ethno-Racial Communities. Toronto: Oxford Press. pp. 98–121.
- Li Y (2005). The structure and evolution of Chinese social stratification. Lanham, Md.: University Press of America. ISBN 978-0-7618-3331-4.
