= Social Exclusion Task Force =

The Social Exclusion Task Force (SETF) was a part of the Cabinet Office that provided the UK Government with strategic advice and policy analysis in its drive against social exclusion. It was preceded by the Social Exclusion Unit, which was set up by the Labour government in 1997 and formed part of the Office of the Deputy Prime Minister. The SETF was abolished in November 2010, and its functions absorbed into the Office for Civil Society.

== Social Exclusion Unit ==
The SEU, launched on 8 December 1997, outlined social exclusion as:

"A shorthand label for what can happen when individuals or areas suffer from a combination of linked problems such as unemployment, poor skills, low incomes, poor housing, high crime environments, bad health and family breakdown"

The SEU published over 50 reports in many areas of social policy. Subjects explored included rough sleeping, teenage pregnancy, mental health, and older people. A report called Reducing Re-Offending by Ex-prisoners was published in July 2002, identifying the needs of prisoners' families and the problems they faced. In July 2004 the Home Office published its response Reducing Re-offending National Action Plan. The Action Plan's recommendations were criticised as "very disappointing and extremely weak" and "elementary" by the Home Affairs Select Committee.

In 2005, the SEU published Transitions: Young Adults with Complex Needs which identified 27 cross-governmental action points to improve support for 16- to 25-year-olds by teaching them "basic life skills".

== Social Exclusion Task Force ==
In 2006, the SEU merged with the Prime Minister's Strategy Unit. The task force aimed to ensure that Government departments work together to deliver services for the most disadvantaged members of society. It was located in Admiralty Arch, part of the Cabinet Office's buildings in Whitehall and employed around thirty staff. The director at the time of its abolition was Naomi Eisenstadt.

== Selected publications ==
- Bringing Britain Together: a National Strategy for Neighbourhood Renewal
- Teenage Pregnancy, June 1999
- Making the Connections: Final report on transport and social exclusion
- Mental health and social exclusion
- Preventing social exclusion
- Jobs and Enterprise in Deprived Areas
- A Sure Start to Later Life
- Transitions: Young Adults with Complex Needs

== See also ==
- Asociality
- NEET
- Disconnected youth
- Homelessness
- Social alienation
- Social invisibility
- Social rejection
- Youth exclusion
