= RepaNet =

RepaNet is an environmental and employment creation project based in Graz, Austria. It combines three complementary goals: the ecological goal of cutting waste by repairing and reusing things instead of throwing them away, the social goal of providing jobs for long-term unemployed people and the local economy goal of supporting small firms and building regional value.

The initiative is a triangular partnership involving small businesses as well as NGOs and the public sector. The co-ordinators see this as a 'win-win-win situation': The local authority and the ministry prize the environmental benefits, the chamber of commerce sees benefits for local firms, and the labour market service sees disadvantaged people back in work.

RepaNet is not just creating jobs that are sustainable in resource terms, but is also building attitudes and practices that are vital for the long-term development of the local economy. It is a training ground where consumers can learn to reuse waste, businesses can learn to co-operate and politicians can learn to think in terms of balanced growth.

== Business activities ==
A range of low buildings in a yard near Graz's railway station is home to Ökoservice , and the base for four different environmental services:

- chopping, removing and composting garden waste, for the local authority environment department and for local householders. There is a steady demand;
- the hire of recycling catering equipment for events, operating out of a warehouse full of racks of plastic tumblers, plates and cutlery, all neatly crated and shrink-wrapped. This service was born in 1999 when Graz won the football cup, and the town's Liebenauer Stadium was left littered with disposable cups. The city's environment department put up €140,000 to buy a large-capacity washing machine which meant reusable plastic tumblers could be used. The service now reuses over a million tumblers a year – and turnover still peaks when Graz wins at football. There are some 200 regular customers, who value guaranteed quality and predictable costs;
- the dismantling and recycling of electrical equipment, which is done in collaboration with a private company.
- a 280 kW combined heat and power (CHP) station, the result of a university research project, has been installed in a freight container opposite the warehouse, and turns 70 tons a year of used frying oil into electric power, as well as heating the premises. The service collects 200 tons of oil a year from restaurants. What is not used in the co-generation plant is sent to southern Styria for processing into biodiesel. Some of it comes back as fuel for Graz's buses, lending them a distinctive smell.

== Socio-economic impacts ==
=== Work integration ===
The Ökoservice workforce numbers 45. Of these, 10 are 'key workers', 27 temporary Transitarbeiter – long-term unemployed people employed on subsidised contracts of up to 14 months – and the rest ex-Transitarbeiter who have graduated to permanent contracts.

It recruits long-term unemployed people, who find it difficult to get a job for any number of reasons – because they are ex-offenders, migrants, illiterate, ill, or just women who want to go back to work after raising a family. Most of Ökoservice's employees have the status of ‘transit worker’ (Transitarbeiter) under Austrian law, which means that for up to 14 months their employer can claim a subsidy worth 60% of their wages costs from the Labour Market Office (Arbeitsmarktservice – AMS). This brings in a little less than half the enterprise's €1.3 million revenue, the other half being earned from the sale of services.

Ökoservice is determinedly a business, not a make-work scheme. Legally, it is a share company with two owners, the environmental NGO ARGE Müllvermeidung and the repair workshop BAN. It took the form of a profit-making company, because in Austria there is no specific social economy status that a trading firm can adopt. However the tax office recognises it as of being public utility (gemeinnützig), and so it levies VAT at 10%, half the standard rate.

Ökoservice is determined to combine social goals with its ecological and economic ones. It has the status of a Beschäftingungsgesellschaft (employment company), which is something special to the Land of Styria. The advantage of this status is that it brings the incentive to trade profitably like any other company. This is not the case for the so-called sozialökonomische Betriebe (social economic enterprises) which are driven by an administrative logic (i.e. spending a budget), rather than an entrepreneurial one (i.e. earning a profit), so they are unable to invest. There are some 200 Sozialökonomische Betriebe all over Austria, and ten Beschäftigungsgesellschaften, uniquely in Styria.

=== Employment training ===
The staff are flexible, having at least two skills, which brings some variety into their working lives. Business peaks in the summer, so Ökoservice runs its training course during the winter. The syllabus includes job skills – maybe horticulture, forestry or forklift driving – plus employability skills such as computing, using e-mail, form-filling, CV-writing, goal setting, conflict management, drug awareness and first aid. The training is delivered on the premises, and lasts for nine weeks at 35 hours per week. A personal development counsellor is on hand to place people in an appropriate job. In ten years, 297 Ökoservice trainees have found permanent work, which is a 75% success rate.

Ökoservice has become a local institution, and is seen to create a range of benefits: an appropriate type of work for the target group, a variety of different jobs that workers can switch between, and the opportunity to get a qualification. It offers services that would not be offered in the market, and employs people who would not be employable in the open labour market. It gives these people support and mentoring, and raises public awareness of ecological and labour market issues – Graz is an EU ‘Eco-city’ and Ökoservice was selected as a Local Agenda 21 good practice. It has opened a branch in Sankt Veit am Vogau, 40 km south of Graz, and an extension to Vienna is under consideration.

The Ökoservice business model has worked well for a decade now, but there is a cloud on the horizon. The Arbeitsmarktservice, which has no way to measure the quality of the service it is paying for, wants to reduce the allowance it pays to integrate unemployed people.

=== Waste reduction ===
Another social enterprise, BAN (Beratung, Arbeit, Neubeginn – ‘Advice, Work, New Start’) , is to be found in an old house in the inner-city neighbourhood of Gries. A pair of furniture vans stand in the yard, and the verandah is stacked with cupboards and similar items. BAN's main activity is collecting, renovating and selling old furniture and household equipment. Like Ökoservice, BAN, which was founded in 1983, earns about half its revenue from selling goods and services, and makes up the difference with the grants it receives in return for integrating long-term unemployed people. About two-thirds of household equipment that people throw out can be reused. So Graz saves €100,000 a year in landfill costs. The 50 workers repair about 1,000 items a year. An upstairs room is the meeting point for the Graz Repair Network, which brings together representatives from a score of local businesses, who energetically debate their collective image and plan promotional events. Many traditional crafts are built on the idea of durability and repair, and jewellers, watchmakers, cobblers, tailors, plumbers, carpenters, smiths, electricians and bicycle shops have all joined the networks. RepaNet members agree a quality standard which commits them to attempt any reasonable repair, to deal with at least five different brands of equipment, and to charge a set amount for a binding quotation.

== Innovation - Making the wheels go round ==
A more specialised operation is based on an industrial estate in Liezen, 120 kilometres northwest of Graz amid the mountains of Northern Styria. This industrial town of 7,000 was once the home of state-owned engineering firm Voestalpine. The works closed down in the 1990s with the loss of over a thousand skilled craft jobs. GBL (Gemeinnützige Beschäftigungsgesellschaft Liezen) has created products that make good use both of these specialist skills and of traditional local materials. The most original line produced is water wheels. The workshop helped renovate three old watermills and the idea grew from there. The normal size is one-and-a-half metres across, but they make them as big as three metres. And they are all made from local larch wood. The company has found a niche market at the intersection of tourism, the environment and science education, and also fabricates items such as Archimedes screws, which make popular hands-on exhibits at a local water theme park.

The waterwheels are GBL's trademark, but its high skills base means that the enterprise can fabricate all sorts of metal or wood prototypes and is always on the lookout for new product ideas. It has contracts to make high-end wooden office equipment and mountings for diesel engines, and is experimenting with ideas such as ceramic plaques and wooden toys.

It also renovates and repairs household equipment, especially white goods (washing machines, dishwashers, tumble driers, electric stoves etc.), which it sells with a one-year guarantee. It also offers a wide range of services both in the open air – cleaning historical monuments, landscaping, building footpaths, cycle paths and cross-country skiing trails, clearing snow, maintaining playing fields and other open spaces – as well as indoors, such as house clearance.

GBL's workshop is open-plan, as it is important for customer confidence that they can see the repairs being done. This means they both have trust in the quality of the renovation, and can identify with the enterprise's social values. The enterprise works as part of the local Repair Network, along with 25 other local businesses. They pay an annual fee of €100. Working together means they have a more prominent brand and can refer customers to the best specialist.

== Cost-benefit: Breakeven for the benefit system ==
GBL employs 21 handicapped people, 12 long-term unemployed 'transit workers' and 17 key workers, and has a 70% success rate in placing people in permanent jobs. New employees rotate round the different jobs for the first few months so that the enterprise can find out where their strengths and interests lie. Especially for women, GBL runs a course where they can try three different professions in a week – carpentry, metalwork and electronics – to see what suits them best. It finds that women want part-time work and flexible working hours, but the problem is that AMS can normally only find full-time posts. Each job costs an estimated €25,000 to fill – but there is a significant saving as regards the economic and social costs of unemployment.

The Institut für Höhere Studien in Vienna investigated the issue of costs in a study of RUSZ, a similar workshop in Vienna, which places 55% of its trainees in permanent jobs. It found that if they stay employed and pay tax for 3.5 years, then the state breaks even. Even if they do not find an external job, keeping someone in unemployment benefit for a year costs the state about €43,000, but supporting a job in the social economy costs only half that.

== Triangular partnership ==
RepaNet is based on the principle that a table needs three legs, or it will fall over. It applies this analogy to the provision of social services in today's cash-strapped climate. The demand for social services is rising, but the resources to meet it are not. So the social economy has been seen as a substitute for public or private action. But the project does not see itself as a substitute, and believes that triangular partnerships are needed.

Based on this principle, RepaNet brings in not just the local authorities, labour market service and environmental activists, but also local SMEs. When it builds up a local Repair Network, it can bring local small businesses on board because they gain market contacts and benefit from sharing know-how, as well as providing jobs for thetrainees. Partnership with the companies means that RepaNet is kept abreast of the skills that are in demand, and can recruit trainees with matching aptitudes and desires. The EQUAL project gives each network a kick start by supporting the costs of two key workers – a trainer and a strategist.

The development partnership also has a 'vertical' dimension, linking the regional networks with the key decision makers at national level, including the environment ministry, employers and trade unions. But the key relationship is with the local town councils, the Gemeinden. Shared environmental goals mean that a close relationship is relatively easy to establish. A shared history also helps: ARGE Müllvermeidung, which was founded in 1982, has since 1986 run educational courses for 300 waste advisers. Many of these people are now working in local authority environment departments, and are partners in the project via the Abfallwirtschaftsverein. The ARGE is well known, and the connection between the social economy and ecology comes easily to people's minds. Nevertheless, local businesses sometimes fear that employment companies may constitute unfair competition, so it is an asset to have the ministry and chamber of commerce (Wirtschaftkammer) behind it.

Institutional anchoring is vital to the RepaNet idea. So although its primary ideological drive is to reduce environmental damage through waste minimisation, it sometimes seems reluctant to go out and sell the products it so inventively designs and manufactures. It does not want to forget what sort of a business it is – one that integrates unemployed people back into the workforce.

== Transnational vision ==
The project has a vision that builds from the bottom up to European level. Thanks to the support of EQUAL, the RepaNet model has spread from Vienna and Graz to five other regions in Austria. Altogether, the five enterprises employ 90 people and repair 4,000 items of equipment a year. Each repair centre has its own speciality: in Graz it is audio, video and computers, in Liezen white goods, in Ried-im-Innkreis bicycles, in Vienna computers – and multifunctional Hohenems tackles white goods, computers and bicycles. Under the aegis of the national federation, two more regional networks are in their formative stages.

The national federation Reparaturnetzwerk Österreich is in turn a member of the European network RREUSE (Recycling and Reuse European Social Enterprises) , which was established in 2001. Most environmental legislation is decided at European level now, so having an EU-wide voice is seen as vital. RREUSE holds meetings with the Environment Commissioner and European parliamentarians, and seems to have had a real influence on the WEEE (waste electrical and electronic equipment) directive. It has also submitted a joint response to the public consultation on the EU sustainable development strategy.

== Into the mainstream market ==
As well as lobbying for policy change, RREUSE helps its members to develop the best delivery mechanisms. Its 1,000 member enterprises employ 16,000 people across ten countries of Europe. In March 2004 RREUSE members came to Graz to take part in the exchange mart the RepaNet DP organised within their transnational partnership SENECA – Social economy network for environmental co-operation activities (TCA 237). The event enabled participating organisations to exchange ideas for new environmental businesses in the social economy, by addressing both customers and producers. Customer awareness is built through the visibility of the services offered to the public, such as the BAN repair workshop or the garden waste composting service. On the supply side, the regional RepaNet networks bring in small businesses and enable them to swap skills and knowledge to their mutual advantage. National and international networking also gives access to economies of scale in marketing. A number of RREUSE member firms have established an EEIG (European economic interest group) called Serranet to carry out marketing at European level, using such channels as the internet or a catalogue.

== EQUAL project ==
The project contributes to the strategy set out in the European Commission's Integrated guidelines for growth and jobs (2005-2008). Its Guideline 14 encourages the adoption of environmental technologies, guideline 15 calls for local industrial clusters, and guideline 18 recommends measures to include disadvantaged people in the labour market.

Thus, it was part of a 'development partnership' (Reparaturnetzwerk Österreich, DP no. AT-3-08/135) within the EQUAL Community Initiative, part of the European Union's Structural Funds. Its lead organisation was Arbeitsgemeinschaft Müllvermeidung, Dreihackengasse 1, 8020 Graz, Austria, telephon: +43 316 71 23 09, e-mail schleich@arge.at (Berthold Schleich). Partner organisations in Austria were:

- Abfallwirtschaft Tirol Mitte GmbH
- BAN – Beratung Arbeit Neubeginn, Verein zur Beratung und Beschäftigung von Arbeitslosen
- Bundesministerium für Land- und Forstwirtschaft, Umwelt und Wasserwirtschaft
- Caritas der Diözese Feldkirch
- Die Umweltberatung – Verband österreichischer Umweltberatungsstellen, Gemeinnützige Beschäftigungsgesellschaft mbH Liezen
- Rieder Initiative für Arbeitslose
- Verband Abfallberatung Österreich
- Verband Wiener Volksbildung – Projekt RUSZ
- Wirtschaftskammer Österreich
- Österreichischer Abfallwirtschaftsverein
- Österreichischer Gewerkschaftsbund

RepaNet's work was taken forward in two new development partnerships in the second round of EQUAL: Econet Austria focused on setting up integration firms in the recycling of electronic waste, while PSPP' (Public Social Private Partnership) aimed to take social enterprise into new fields.
