= Ewa Kassala =

Polish writer

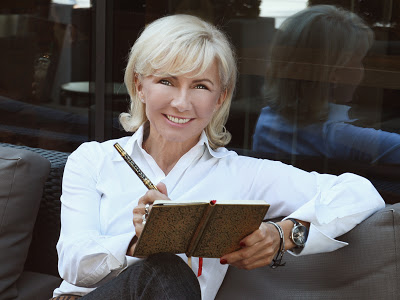
- Born: Dorota Stasikowska-Woźniak
- Occupations: Writer, journalist, screenwriter
- Known for: literature
- Notable work: Dress for Success; Cleopatra's Passions; Divine Nefertiti; Hatshepsut

Ewa Kassala is a Polish writer, journalist, trainer, social action creator, self-presentation and, public image creator, screenwriter and a host of television programmes, conferences, conventions and sessions, mainly for women. Some of her books have been published under the name Dorota Stasikowska-Woźniak.

== Career ==
She has also been a coordinator of social and research projects on both countrywide and global scale, a chairwoman in the national thematic system EQUAL; Silesian voivode's public plenipotentiary for the Equality of Genders, a member in the Coordinate Norwegian Committee for Financial Movements. She has founded and led, inter alia, Soroptimist International Silesian Club Nike and Silesian Centre of Equal Chances. She has also brought to Poland the public benefit organization Dress for Success, which she now oversees.

== Awards and honours ==
- "Businesswoman of the Year"
- "Chapeau bas"
- Soroptimist International "Steel Carnation"
- "Queen of Charity"

== Selected works ==
- "Cleopatra", Oficyna Wydawnicza Leksykon, 1995, ISBN 83-86242-57-4
- "Portrait of woman in the age of perdition", Videograf II, 1999, ISBN 83-7183-100-5
- "Mandrake", Burda Książki, 2014, ISBN 9788377786116
- "Cleopatra's Passions", Royal Hawaiian Press, 2017, ISBN 978-1-947228-16-0
- "Divine Nefertiti", Royal Hawaiian Press, 2017 ISBN 978-1-947228-29-0
- Hatshepsut", Wydawnictwo Sonia Draga, 2017, ISBN 978-83-8110-248-3

=== Guidebooks ===
- "Public speeches and creation of image", Śląskie Centrum Równych Szans, 2005, ISBN 83-910203-0-4
- "How to be a Modern Lady", Polski Dom Kreacji, 2009, ISBN 978-83-61222-00-2
- "Guidebook of a Modern Witch", Novum, 2000, ISBN 83-910203-5-5
- "Dress for Success", G+J Książki, 2013, ISBN 978-83-7778-591-1
