= Bengt-Christian Fuchs =

German judge and civil servant

- Education: University of Göttingen
- Occupations: Judge; Civil servant

Bengt-Christian Fuchs is a German lawyer serving as head of unit at the Thuringian Ministry of Justice, Migration and Consumer Protection. He is a judge and vice president of the Administrative court of Gera. He has been under investigation for allegedly making racist comments on an internet forum under a pseudonym.

== Early life and education ==
Fuchs studied at the University of Göttingen where he was member of the Studentenverbindung (fraternity) "Turnerschaft Salia Jenensis". In 2002, he published his PhD thesis on the "Sollicitatur" at the Reichskammergericht.

== Career ==
=== Judge and Vice President of the Administrative Court Gera ===
Until December 2024, Fuchs was judge and vice president of the administrative court Gera. In November 2023, he came under scrutiny for his judgements having statistically significant bias against asylum seekers, when compared to the national average. He has been accused of associations with the far-right party Alternative für Deutschland

A chapter in the 2021 book “Rechte Richter” (Right-wing judges) was published, revealing links between Fuchs and other judges in Gera and AfD politicians.

In 2022, 10 Thuringian organizations published a position paper on the judiciary in Thuringia (Forderungspapier zur Justiz in Thüringen) in which they drew attention to the connections of the judges to the far right. >

In July 2024, Fuchs was accused of having published racist remarks on an internet forum, under a pseudonym. This led to disciplinary proceedings that were pending as of January 2025.

The President of the Administrative Court, Michael Obhues, is responsible for the disciplinary proceedings, which are led by a judge unknown to the public. Obhues himself has been repeatedly criticized for his jurisdiction. For example, he has questioned the classification of the Thuringian AfD as proven right-wing extremist by the Thuringian Office for the Protection of the Constitution.

=== Unit head at Thuringian Ministry of Justice ===
In December 2024, Fuchs was transferred to the Thuringian Ministry of Justice, where he serves as unit head (Referatsleiter) with responsibilities for economic administration, the European Social Fund, and public relations.

== Works ==
- Die Sollicitatur am Reichskammergericht. Quellen und Forschungen zur höchsten Gerichtsbarkeit im Alten Reich. Böhlau, 2002
