= Institute for Small and Medium Industry of the Generalitat Valenciana =

- Established: 1984
- Staff: 100
- Location: Spain
- Website: www.impiva.es

The Institute for Small and Medium Industry of the Generalitat Valenciana (IMPIVA) is a public body of the Generalitat Valenciana established by the law of the Generalitat Valenciana 2 / 84 and attached to the Ministry of Economy, Industry and Commerce.

From the moment of its founding in 1984, is dedicated to promoting policies to promote innovation and to offer support to the small and medium enterprises (SMEs) industrial Valencia.

This provides support a non-profit companies and organizations that work with the SMEs in different areas such as technology and I + D, quality and environment, training and technological cooperation or development and enterprise.

== Objectives and Functions IMPIVA ==
- Promotion and protection of a network of technical services infrastructure to support the SMEs composed of:
1. Technological Institutes: specialized in the different industry sectors Valencia, Valencian SMEs offer a range of advanced technological services, as well as a line of research, development and innovation to improve competitiveness.
2. Innovative European Business Centre (BIC : non-profit associations that support and provide facilities for the creation of new businesses, or provide innovative activities in the area that are located .
- Work with business associations in the development of actions to support the industry.
- Collaboration with public and private entities to evolve in the areas of knowledge, research and business management.
- Collaboration with the Ministry of Industry, Tourism and Trade to promote the relationship of Valencian companies with programs and services provided by the central government.
- Coordination of the incursion of the entities of the Valencia to programs offered by the European Union.

The IMPIVA has resources of the European Union, provided by the European Social Fund (ESF) and European Regional Development Fund (ERDF), as set out in the Operational Programme of the Community Valencia 2007-2013.
