= Social firm =

British business model which employs disabled and disadvantaged persons

Social firm is the British term for a work integration social enterprise (WISE), a business created to employ people who have a disability or are otherwise disadvantaged in the labour market. Its commercial and production activities are undertaken in the context of a social mission, with profits going back into the company to further its goals. A significant number of the employees of social firms will be people with a disability or disadvantage, including mental health issues. The firms grew out of disillusionment with mainstream businesses, and the failure to recognise or enable everyone's potential. All workers are paid a market-rate wage or salary appropriate to the work. All employees are intended to have the same employment opportunities, rights and obligations.

Social Firms England, which supports the development of the social firm sector in England, suggests that there are two types of social firm, those which provide employment in businesses producing marketable goods and services, and those which work to improve the employability of those they work with.

== History ==
The original social firms were established well before the term came into use in 1980s. Firms in Europe started to prosper and employ increasing numbers of people with a disability. Schemes, and coordinating organisations, became more established and numerous in the 1990

Iain Duncan Smith visited Pluss, a social firm in Exeter which makes cushions for wheelchairs and car upholstery, in March 2015. The firm is owned by four councils: Devon, Plymouth, Somerset and Torbay and is facing potential closure of its manufacturing operations in Exeter and Bridgwater, and rationalisation of corporate services could result in up to 75 redundancies.

== Star Social Firm ==
Star Social Firm is an externally validated standard ensuring that a social firm meets a set of quality measures.

== See also ==
- Social enterprise
- Disability rights
- Social inclusion
- Social model of disability
- Psychiatric rehabilitation
- Recovery model
- Social psychiatry
- RepaNet
