= Community-led local development =

European Union initiative to fund local development

Logo of the LEADER initiative

The community-led local development (CLLD) funding approach is a European Union initiative to support the decentralised management of development projects, primarily in rural, but also in coastal and urban areas, by involving relevant local actors, including local organizations and associations, as well as individual citizens. At first it was limited to the rural areas under the name LEADER (the acronym standing for French: Liaison entre actions de développement de l'économie rurale, English: Links between actions for the development of the rural economy).

== Operation and objectives ==
CLLD projects are managed by local action groups (LAGs). Members of LAG may be public authorities (such as municipalities or other local or regional public bodies), public-private entities, associations, NGOs, companies, citizens and many more types of players. Decisions are taken in executive committees in which private players must have at least 51% of the votes, thus avoiding public-sector control.

Projects are implemented as part of local development strategies (LDSs), which include in-depth assessments of the area, objectives and expected results. A new LDS is developed for each programming period, allowing new challenges and opportunities to be addressed. As the LDSs present the main backbone of a LEADER area, they are (in most cases) developed in close cooperation with local and regional stakeholders, such as citizens, members of the LAG and other private or public partners (bottom-up approach). Each LDS must involve a relatively small area, with a population of between 10,000 and 100,000 inhabitants.

LEADER is funded by the European Union's Common Agricultural Policy (CAP) investment pillar (Pillar II) and is implemented by the Member State's CAP Strategic Plans during the 2023-2027 programming period.

In France, the whole country is eligible with the exception of urban areas with over 50,000 inhabitants. France has 140 local action groups. In Luxembourg, all of the country's rural municipalities are eligible (with one exception). Luxembourg has 5 LAGs.

== Methodology ==
From 1991 until 2001 the LEADER/CLLD methodology was developed with the support of the European Commission's technical assistance contractor, AEIDL. LEADER developed seven principles of local development.

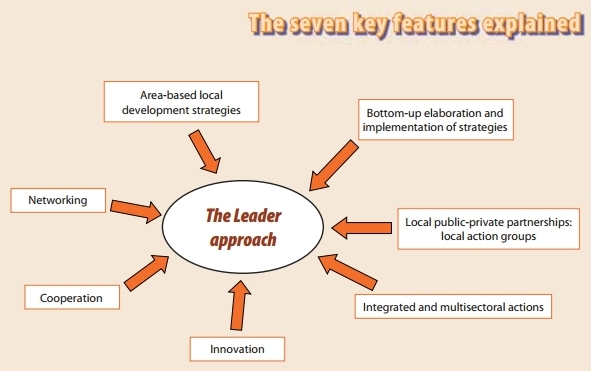
The 7 principles of the LEADER/CLLD local development approach

These are:

- Area-based: taking place in a small, homogeneous socially cohesive territory
- Bottom-up: local actors design the strategy and choose the actions
- Public-private partnership: LAGs are balanced groups involving public and private-sector actors, which can mobilise all available skills and resources
- Innovation: giving LAGs the flexibility to introduce new ideas and methods
- Integration: between economic, social, cultural and environmental actions, as distinct from a sectoral approach
- Networking: allowing learning among people, organisations and institutions at local, regional, national and European levels
- Co-operation: among LEADER groups, for instance to share experiences, allow complementarity or to achieve critical mass

== History and funding ==
- LEADER I (1991–93) supported 217 LAGs with EU funding of €0.442 billion from the European Agricultural Guidance and Guarantee Fund (EAGGF)
- LEADER II (1994–99) supported 906 LAGs with EU funding of €1.755 billion
- LEADER+ (2000–06) supported 893 LAGs with EU funding of €2.105 billion, and a total budget of €5.05 billion

In the programming period (2014-2020), the LEADER method was extended to cover not only rural but also coastal (FARNET) and urban areas under the general designation community-led local development (CLLD), financed from all the European Structural and Investment Funds except the Cohesion Fund.

Writing in the Regional Studies Association blog, Haris Martinos of LDNet points out that the idea of local development arose spontaneously in the 1980s before attracting the interest of EU policy-makers and being operationalised within the LEADER programme in 1991. However policy interest declined in the 2000s. After 2010, interest resurged and the ‘CLLD’ label was introduced for the 2014-2021 EU programming period. However there are fears that CLLD has lost its strategic purpose and become reduced to a bureaucracy for spending relatively small sums of public money.

The European Network for Rural Development lists 3,134 local action groups. The approach has been used widely across the European Union, but also in countries of the Eastern Partnership, such as Georgia.
