= Minister for Social Inclusion (South Australia) =

South Australian cabinet minister (2004–2011)

Minister for Social Inclusion of South Australia
- Style: The Honourable
- Appointer: Premier of South Australia
- Inaugural holder: Mike Rann
- Formation: 2004
- Final holder: Mike Rann
- Abolished: October 2011

The Minister for Social Inclusion was a role in the Government of South Australia from 2004 to 2011.

The position of Social Inclusion Minister was initiated by the South Australian Government in 2004, when then-Premier Mike Rann adopted the title. He held the portfolio until his retirement as Premier in October 2011. In 2002 Premier Rann established the Social Inclusion Initiative headed by Monsignor David Cappo, who was later appointed as the state's Social Inclusion Commissioner, sitting on the Executive Committee of Cabinet. The Initiative led to a big investment in strategies to combat homelessness, including establishing the Common Ground program and Street to Home initiative, the ICAN flexible learning strategy to improve school retention and major funding to revamp mental health in South Australia.

== List of Social Inclusion ministers ==
#	Minister	Party affiliation	Period
1	Mike Rann	Australian Labor Party	2004–2011
