= EQUAL Community Initiative =

EQUAL was a Community Initiative within the European Social Fund of the European Union. It concerned “transnational co-operation to promote new means of combating all forms of discrimination and inequalities in connection with the labour market”. It ran from 2001 till 2007 with a budget of some €3 billion of EU resources, matched by a similar sum from national resources.

EQUAL was part of the European Union's strategy for "more and better jobs" and for ensuring that no-one is denied access to them. It tested new ways of tackling discrimination and inequality experienced by those in work and those looking for a job. From 2008 it has been discontinued, but its principles were intended to be incorporated into the mainstream Structural Funds. In practice, in the 2007-2013 period transnational work in the ESF was virtually limited to the 17 Learning Networks or Communities of practice that were established under the Learning for Change programme. These involved the 117 ESF Managing Authorities (mostly national ministries and regions) and their key external partners, but had a much more limited budget and reach than EQUAL did.

EQUAL co-financed activities in all 27 EU Member States - the 12 new countries actually joined in January 2004, 4 months before their official accession. The EU contribution to EQUAL of €3.274 billion was matched by national funding. EQUAL differed from the European Social Fund mainstream programmes in its function as a laboratory (principle of innovation) and in its emphasis on active co-operation between Member States. Two calls for proposals for EQUAL projects in the Member States took place, the first in 2001 and the second in 2004. Responsibility for the implementation of the Community Initiative programmes in the Member States lay with the national authorities.

== Themes ==
EQUAL projects were classified into the four pillars of the European Employment Strategy, and more precisely into nine themes:

1. Employability

a) Facilitating access and return to the labour market for those who have difficulty in being integrated or re-integrated into a labour market which must be open to all

b) Combating racism and xenophobia in relation to the labour market

2. Entrepreneurship

c) Opening up the business creation process to all by providing the tools required for setting up in business and for the identification and exploitation of new possibilities for creating employment in urban and rural areas

d) Strengthening the social economy (the third sector), in particular the services of interest to the community, with a focus on improving the quality of jobs

3. Adaptability

e) Promoting lifelong learning and inclusive work practices which encourage the recruitment and retention of those suffering discrimination and inequality in connection with the labour market

f) Supporting the adaptability of firms and employees to structural economic change and the use of information technology and other new technologies

4. Equal Opportunities for women and men

g) Reconciling family and professional life, as well as the reintegration of men and women who have left the labour market, by developing more flexible and effective forms of work organisation and support services

h) Reducing gender gaps and supporting job desegregation.

5. (i) Asylum seekers

== The building blocks of EQUAL ==
EQUAL adopted an innovative way of working designed to ensure that its lessons were long-lasting. Support was given not to time-limited projects but to some 3,500 ‘development partnerships’ (DPs) which brought different types of institution together. Typically they included for instance local authorities, businesses, colleges and trade unions. One of the effects of obliging different types of organisation to work together in order to gain financial support has been to build up the relationship and habits necessary for continued partnership working.

Secondly, DPs were obliged to attempt to ‘mainstream’ their results, that is to go beyond simply ‘disseminating’ them to other potential practitioners, but also to make serious attempts to influence policy-makers.

Thirdly, EQUAL was a programme that studied numerous process issues such as the way innovation is created, the way people can best work together and the way policies are changed.

It followed these principles:

- Partnership: to bring together key actors (local and regional authorities, training bodies, public employment services, NGOs, enterprises, social partners) in Development Partnerships (DPs) on a geographical or sectoral level to tackle discrimination and inequality.
- Thematic approach: to concentrate actions on thematic fields in keeping with the European Employment Strategy.
- Innovation: to explore and test innovative approaches in formulating, delivering and implementing employment and training policies.
- Empowerment: to strengthen capacity building by making all relevant actors, including beneficiaries, work together on an equal footing.
- Transnationality: to render it possible for individual DPs and national authorities to learn from each other and co-operate productively across borders.
- Mainstreaming: to develop and test new ways of integrating best practices into employment and social inclusion policies.

== Follow-up ==
=== 2007-2013 ===
For the 2007-13 Structural Funds programming period, the decision was taken to abolish the Community Initiative in the European Social Fund. Transnational co-operation was carried out only on an ad hoc basis organised multilaterally among Member States, and was in consequence much diminished. However 17 Learning Networks operated at EU level.

=== 2014-2020 ===
In the 2014-20 programming period, a structure to co-ordinate transnational co-operation was re-established in the form of the ESF Transnational Platform,which was managed by AEIDL. This comprised:

- nine thematic networks which engaged in mutual learning activities and co-ordinated calls for proposals which allowed projects in different EU countries to work together
- a website to facilitate collaboration
- database to manage these co-ordinated calls for proposals
- information, publications and annual events

The common themes were:

- employment
- inclusion
- youth employment (including youth mobility)
- learning and skills
- social economy
- governance and public administration
- simplification (of ESF financing procedures)
- migrants

Mutual learning: The thematic networks met three times in each year, in Brussels or by invitation in other capital cities. They each involved on average 10 Member States (representatives of ESF Managing Authorities and ministries responsible for the policy area concerned) and 5 other stakeholders such as NGOs and social partners. The largest network was that on simplification, which had 25 of the 28 Member States in membership. The networks' mutual learning activities included conducting seminars, study visits and peer reviews, preparing white papers and studies of good practice, and holding workshops as part of larger conferences.

Co-ordinated calls: During the 2014-2020 programming period, the Platform supported two rounds of co-ordinated calls for proposals. The first took place in 2016, but only four countries or regions - Finland, Flanders, Poland and Sweden - took part. This resulted in approximately 100 transnational projects with a combined budget of approximately €14 million. The second round of calls took place in 2018.

=== 2021-2027 ===
In the 2021-27 programming period, support to transnational cooperation in the ESF has been even more limited. Four communities of practice, which are working on the following themes:

- social innovation - social innovation in ESF+, community-led local development (CLLD), scaling up innovations
- employment, education and skills - NEETs, long-term unemployment, education and training
- results-based management - simplification
- social inclusion - child poverty, deinstitutionalisation, homelessness (Housing First)

A new website has been established.

== Links to development partnerships ==
- CAP Markets
- RepaNet
- Valnalón
