= Electoral district of Briggs =

Former state electoral district of South Australia

Briggs South Australia—House of Assembly
- State: South Australia
- Created: 1985
- Abolished: 1993
- Demographic: Metropolitan

Briggs was an electoral district of the House of Assembly in the Australian state of South Australia from 1985 to 1993. The district was based in the northern suburbs of Adelaide.

Briggs was a safe Labor seat. It was abolished in 1993, with sitting member Mike Rann successfully moving to the nearby seat of Ramsay. Much of the Briggs area was then represented by the new seat of Wright.

== Member for Briggs ==
Member	Party	Term
Mike Rann	Labor	1985–1993
