= Youth exclusion =

Form of social exclusion

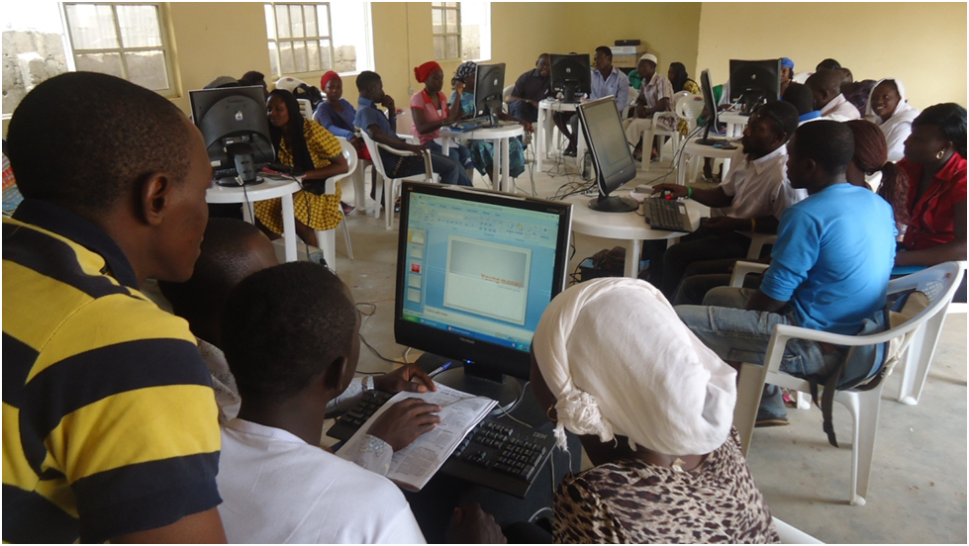
The Incubators Youth Outreach Network-Nigeria is a religiously founded program in Nigeria whose aim is to avoid violence by providing support and job training to youth facing exclusion due to unemployment and barriers to education.

Youth exclusion is a form of social exclusion in which youth are at a social disadvantage in joining institutions and organizations in their societies. Troubled economies, lack of governmental programs, and barriers to education are examples of dysfunctions within social institutions that contribute to youth exclusion by making it more difficult for youth to transition into adulthood. European governments have recently recognized these shortcomings in societies organizational structures and have begun to re-examine policies regarding social exclusion. Many policies dealing with social exclusion are targeted at youth since this demographic of people face a transition into adulthood; defining career and lifestyle choices that will affect the future culture and structure of a society.

Youth exclusion is multi-dimensional in that age, race, gender, class and lifestyle all affect youth life experiences within a given culture. This intersectionality affects the degree to which an individual youth experiences exclusion. Similarly, youth exclusion is context specific. This means that youth are excluded from society in different ways depending on their cultural and spatial locations. A simple difference between the opportunities and resources provided in one neighborhood can create a divide among youth who are included and youth who are excluded from their communities. Another consideration is that youth exclusion is relational insofar as social exclusion contains two parties, the excluders and the excluded. Pertaining to youth exclusion, the excluders are often older generations who believe that the economic support services and institutions that help the youth puts their own comfortable standard of living at risk. All of these demographic, cultural, spatial and relational factors contribute to the worldwide experiences of youth exclusion.

== Roots of youth exclusion ==
Youth exclusion can be examined by dividing its causes into social and cultural factors. Structural reasons for exclusion includes inequalities in power as seen by the inequalities generated in the normal functions of the housing and labor markets. Prolonged unemployment and low income can affect a person's ability to have access to social structures that advance a person in society by opening doors to new opportunities and creating a sense of societal acceptance and inclusion. Also on a structural level, youth are excluded from broader society through barriers to education and discriminatory government policies.

Cultural factors affecting youth exclusion include reactions to socially constructed categories like race and gender. These classifications can also influence an individual's choice to be excluded from society. Some academics argue that youth are marginalized because they choose to separate themselves from mainstream society, opting instead to participate in alternative lifestyles and subcultures. Others, however, view this choice as a "forced choice", motivated by the fear of racial, gender and other types of discrimination. McDonald presents the example of a young black man in the UK who chooses not to go to university because "he fears discrimination as a university student". McDonald says, "This is a negative externality imposed by the socially included that is influencing the choice of the young black man in the direction of social exclusion". In this example both structural and cultural barriers influenced this student so he felt excluded from society; he felt pressure from society to remain on the periphery, and in doing so denying himself access to an education. In this situation education failed as an established social structure to provide this individual with inclusion into society.

=== Poverty ===
Poverty is one of the largest factors that contributes to the perpetuation of youth exclusion. Poverty is an isolating state that affects people's social connections and ability to contribute in culturally specific activities that build communities. As the sociologist Peter Townshend explains;

"Individuals, families and groups can be said to be in poverty when…their resources are so seriously below those commanded by the average individual or family that they are, in effect, excluded from ordinary living patterns, customs and activities"

Indeed, poverty can impair a person's ability to participate in politics, housing and labor markets, secondary education and pop culture related activities. These activities from which those in poverty are excluded can affect a youth's social networking opportunities and thus the future state of their inclusion or exclusion in society.

== Regional youth exclusion ==
Given that the definition of youth exclusion varies across cultures, the concept must include an analysis of what it means to be a member of a given society, for example, "analysis of what it means to be Egyptian, Moroccan, Iranian, or Syrian, to be a Muslim, an Arab, and so on”. Within a country, neighborhoods or states can be divided in such a way that even different youth within a culture can experience exclusion on different levels. Globalization creates comparative exclusions across societies. "Globalization has given the division of labour a strong international dimension, one that strongly favors the West over Africa. Also it has reduced the economic strength of African states and placed the control of their economies in the hands of multinational groups with primary allegiance to their mother countries in Europe and America". Thus, young individuals entering the job market in the Global South are impacted by the actions of countries in the Global North.

=== Middle East and North Africa (MENA) ===
In the Middle East and North Africa (MENA), youth exclusion has several dimensions. As in other regions, youth unemployment is high, with a regional average of 25% unemployment among 15- to 24-year-olds, which reaches as high as 37% in Morocco and up to 73% in Syria. There is also a significant level of labor market segmentation related to economic restructuring and insider-outsider issues;

“Organized insiders with seniority benefit from rents – higher wages, better benefits, and greater tenure – by monopolizing jobs and restricting access to particular sectors. Outsiders, such as youth and new labor market entrants, suffer from longer unemployment durations, skill atrophy, and declining health, as well as the social dimensions of exclusion from work.”

Additionally, youth exclusion in MENA is exacerbated by gender, whether due to child-rearing needs and expectations, sex segregation, parental supervision, or other cultural or religious reasons. For example, compared to 63% of economically active 15- to 24-year-old males, only 22% of females from the same age group were economically active in Egypt in 2006.

As a result of youth unemployment, young people have a tendency of extending their education and delaying marriage and family formation. Like Europe, MENA has seen its youth delay leaving the home, getting married, and beginning families.

Consequences of youth exclusion in MENA have included young people entering waithood, a period during which they simply wait for their lives to begin, most notably by queuing for long periods of unemployment during which they live with parents and are financially unable to pursue marriage or home ownership. While delayed marriage is a trend seen in many societies, adaptations vary, such that it is normal in the United States and Europe for young unmarried couples to cohabitate, while in MENA such an arrangement is unacceptable. Instead, an increasing number of youths are engaging in nikah urfi, temporary marriages, which offer little security to the wife and any subsequent offspring. The psychological impact is also considerable, with unemployment leading to depression and social isolation, often with physical manifestations. There is considerable concern in the international community that these isolated youths are marketed to by extremist groups such as al-Qaeda, who prey upon their sense of social exclusion and hopelessness.

=== India ===
Lack of employment in India has caused the exclusion, especially of young men, from society. Despite prolonged higher education, young men are unable to find work. The government's withdrawal from public education funding has been instrumental in perpetuating youth exclusion in India. The youths' reaction has been to join informal groups of other young men who congregate on street corners or in teahouses to pass the time. These groups feel a sense of helplessness in their inability to join society in a productive manner. The poor economy and lack of jobs in this case are the causes of exclusion among the younger generation, creating the social phenomena labeled as "timepass". This exclusion affects young men's transitions to adulthood by making it difficult for men to marry, find housing and meet cultural gender norms of masculinity. There is also a gendered element to youth exclusion in India. Young women were barred from participating in the teahouse discussions and informal meetings that young males hold in order to cope with exclusion. This segregation is influenced by previously established gender roles that have been shaped by culture.

=== Nigeria ===
The Federal Government of Nigeria explains the youth generation as a group "who is passing through mental and physical developmental process in preparation to face the challenges of adulthood". This definition encompasses a wide range of young people in Nigeria who have had to cope with the struggle of political uncertainty. In addition to government unrest, Nigerian youth have faced barriers to education. When these youth are excluded and barred from future success through unstable political and educational environments, they use violence to protest against society and facilitate a movement for social inclusion. Oftentimes this violence is directed at the government. Research done on Nigerian youth shows that;

"The collapse of social services and the high level commercialization of education have barred many young people from formal education. Thus, the unemployed youths without university education and the numerous graduates who lack prospects for employment have been able to develop a volatile strategy of identity transformation both at the level of consciousness and their attempt to find a space in the new political dispensation. Violence has been a common feature of this coping mechanism"

In Nigeria political and social exclusion occurs when people in positions of power withhold resources or knowledge from the society, directly hurting the youth population which is the most economically insecure and lacking in networks that could help facilitate a successful transition to adulthood. Violence thus becomes a tool for social change.

=== Canada ===
Exclusion among youth in Canada has led to problems of increased homelessness and instability among the youth population. Stephen Gaetz demonstrates a unique situation arising among Canadian youth in which they face stigmatization by their society;

"For young people who become homeless, social exclusion is experienced across several domains: in terms of access to shelter and housing, employment, and a healthy lifestyle, for instance. It is also manifest in their restricted access to (and movement with within) urban spaces and their limited social capital".

Lacking access to certain social organizations and networks has not only excluded youth, but has created a stigma in which society views homeless youth in Canada as criminals. This criminalization is greater among youth because it is known that young people are facing transitions in which riskier behavior may be involved. Government officials are debating policy issues especially in law enforcement in order to prevent this criminalization and perpetuation of exclusion among youth.

== Costs of exclusion to society ==
The costs of youth exclusion can be measured in terms of its multi-dimensional nature. This includes how the intersection of race, gender, class and social location affect youth's ability to access employment, education or other social networks that are imperative to their transition to adulthood. Exclusion can preserve negative prejudices or stereotypes within a culture. Urban youth in America face greater prejudice in environments in which ethnic minorities face minimal intergroup contact in peer settings like school. Gendered differences continue to be problematic in this situation as well. Girls prove to be more sensitive to recognizing racial exclusion among their peers since they also face gender discrimination in school settings. Cultural norms associated with gender play a pivotal role in the perpetuation of the division between excluders and the excluded, creating unequal opportunities among youth. Barriers to social organizations and opportunities can result in unwanted consequences including crime and violence. There are many examples in which youth have formed groups that oppose oppressive and exclusionary governments through violent demonstrations, especially among African nations. These violent reactions also lead to concerns about youth politics, youth identity and the future well-being of nations facing this type of conflict with their youth populations. Indian youth experiencing "timepass" also show signs of increased aggression. Specifically this aggression has been directed towards women, since young men feel powerless in their current state of unemployment.

== Remedies for youth exclusion ==
Sociologist Ruth Levitas created three sociological interpretations used to examine ways in which societies can remedy social exclusion. These tactics affect youth because they deal with the labor market and thus young people just beginning to gain financial independence. The redistributionist discourse (RED) sees poverty as the greatest contributor to social exclusion. This understanding focuses on transferring taxes and welfare to those in need. The moral underclass discourse (MUD) interpretation blames individual choice for causing social exclusion. This method suggests punishment as a means of remedying social exclusion. The last method, social integrationist discourse (SID), views the labor market as the enemy to social exclusion and therefore explores avenues for getting more people into the labor force.

Other ways to decrease youth exclusion include increased intergroup contact between the differing social positions of the excluders and the excluded. Research aimed to decrease youth exclusion has included interventions such as implementing classroom rules (e.g. “you can’t say you can’t play”) to encourage social inclusivity among kids (Harrist & Bradley, 2003). Benefits of inclusion have indeed been measured by sociologists. One such experiment researched elementary aged children to record their personal views on prejudice and social exclusion. The researchers found, "In the present investigation, in accord with prior research (e.g., Crystal et al. 2008; Killen et al. 2007b), ethnic minority students reporting high levels of intergroup contact were more likely to rate race-based exclusion as wrong than were students with low levels of intergroup contact". Integration of peer groups helps lessen xenophobic reactions to others and fosters inclusion among all members of a society. This realization is helpful to educators who want to create inclusive environments so that youth will feel secure in their learning environments.

== See also ==
- Ageism
- Social exclusion
- Street children
- Youth
- Youth mainstreaming
- Youth participation
- Youth politics
- Youth rights
- Youth voice
