= Social economy =

Economic sector

The social economy is formed by a rich diversity of enterprises and organisations, such as cooperatives, mutuals, associations, foundations, social enterprises and paritarian institutions, sharing common values and features:

- Primacy of the individual and the social objective over capital
- Voluntary and open membership
- Democratic governance
- Combination of interests of members/users and/or the general interest
- Defence and application of the principles of solidarity and responsibility
- Autonomous management and independence from public authorities, though cross-sector collaboration is common
- Reinvestment of at least most of the profits to carry out sustainable development objectives, services of interest to members or of general interest

Social economy enterprises and organisations have different sizes, ranging from SMEs to large companies and groups that are leaders in their markets. Social economy entreprises operate in all economic sectors, including retail, industry, agriculture, finance and more.

== History ==
The modern concept of the social economy emerged in nineteenth-century Europe during industrialisation. The term économie sociale first appeared in French economic writing, notably in Charles Dunoyer’s Nouveau traité d’économie sociale. Parallel practical initiatives included mutual-aid societies and cooperatives, the most influential of which was the Rochdale Society of Equitable Pioneers, founded in England in 1844. Their principles of open membership, democratic control, and distribution of surplus according to use became a model for later cooperative movements across Europe.

== Third sector ==
As a field of study, social economy studies the relationship between economy and social behavior. It analyzes how consumer behavior is influenced by social morals, ethics and other humanitarian philosophies. It examines activity that is related to economics in the community and exposes the information to the community; this includes the social enterprise and voluntary sectors.

A social economy develops because of a need for new solutions for issues (social, economic or environmental) and to satisfy needs which have been ignored (or inadequately fulfilled) by the private or public sectors. By using solutions to achieve not-for-profit aims, a social economy has a unique role in creating a strong, sustainable, prosperous and inclusive society.

Successful social-economy organisations play a role in fulfilling governmental policy objectives by:

- Contributing to socially-inclusive wealth creation
- Enabling individuals and communities to renew local neighbourhoods
- Demonstrating new ways to deliver public services
- Developing an inclusive society and active citizenship
- Embracing competitors, as competition may indicate greater overall market productivity in achieving social goals

Defining the limits of a social-economy sector is difficult due to shifting politics and economics; at any time organisations may be "partly in, partly out", moving among sub-sectors of the social economy.

=== Social enterprise compass ===
Organisations may be placed on the social enterprise compass, which measures enterprises and organisations on a continuum between the private and public sectors.

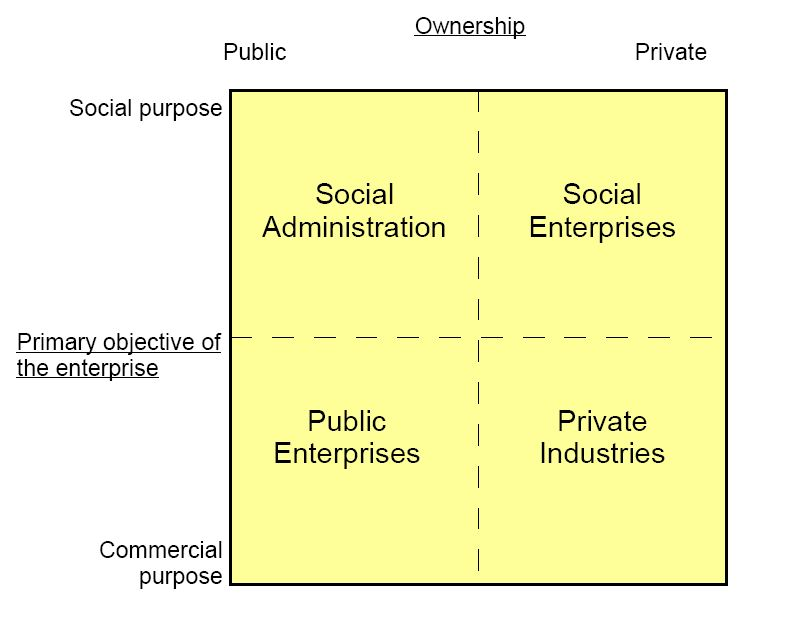

Horizontal axis

On the horizontal axis, each enterprise or organisation is categorized by its ownership. On the left side ownership is by public authorities, and on the right side it is private industry. "Private industry" encompasses all economic activity with the capital of one (or many) private owners, with a view to making a profit for personal benefit. The owners supply financial capital and bear any risk. "Public authorities" encompass all economic activity in which public authorities possess the capital at the national, federal, regional or local level; this includes nationalised and public industries.

Vertical axis

On the vertical axis each enterprise or organisation is categorized by its primary objective, from "social purpose" at the top to "commercial purpose" at the bottom. Social purpose is the primary objective of the enterprise if it meets the following criteria:

- Ethical concept: Core definition
- Mission (key identification): The enterprise's primary objective is to improve the lives of disadvantaged people, provide support, advance social cohesion or improve the environment.
- Social economic creation of value and appropriation of earnings (qualitative key identification): Profits and/or resources are verifiably reinvested for the benefit of disadvantaged people.

If these criteria are met, an organisation is at the top of the vertical axis.

One criterion is a descriptive feature:

- Intermediary function: Social economical enterprises and organisations have an intermediary function (between public and private).

If none of the above criteria are met, or the primary object of the enterprise is commercial, it is located at the bottom of the vertical axis.

Between social and commercial purposes

If the above criteria are partially met, the enterprise is located along the vertical axis according to its self-definition.

== International comparisons ==
=== Canada ===
The definition of Social Economy used by the Chantier de l'économie sociale in Quebec follows: The Social Economy is made up of association-based economic activities founded on values of:

- Service to members or the community rather than only generating profits and seeking financial returns;
- Autonomous management (not government controlled);
- Democratic decision making;
- Primacy of persons and work over capital;
- Based on principles of participation, empowerment and individual and collective responsibility.

The Social Economy includes:

- social assets (housing, childcare centres, etc.) of community organizations;
- social enterprises including co- operatives and revenue-generating programs of non profit groups;
- credit unions and social financing organizations like community loan funds;
- training and skills development enterprises; and
- sectoral and regional organizations e.g. renewal energy associations.

The Canadian Community Economic Development Network (CCEDNet) is a national member-led organization committed to strengthening Canadian communities by creating economic opportunities that enhance social and environmental conditions. The Canadian Social Economy Hub (CSEHub) acted as a facilitator between 2005 and 2011, promoting collaboration among six regional research centres across Canada (Québec, Atlantic, Southern Ontario, Prairies and Northern Ontario, BC and Alberta and the North), and creating opportunities and exchanges with international networks. The Canadian Social Economy Research Partnerships (CSERP) was established in 2005 through a five-year Social Sciences and Humanities Research grant. Over 300 researchers, drawn from universities and Social Economy organisations, have created over 400 products including e-books, occasional papers and paper series.

=== France ===
The term "social economy" derives from the French économie sociale, first recorded about 1900. The sector comprises four families of organisations: cooperatives, mutuals, associations (voluntary organisations) and foundations (which, in France, must be of "public utility"). The social economy is a major sector, representing 10,3 percent of employment.

=== Spain ===
The first Law of Social Economy in Europe was approved in Spain in early 2011. By 2013, the social economy in Spain represented 12% of the Gross Domestic Product, with more than 44,500 businesses, more than 2,215,000 employees, impacting more than 16,528,000 associated people, and producing €150.978 million in gross sales. Consequently, the concept of economía social is firmly embedded in the country's academic, political and economic institutions.

The process of national political integration of the social economy in Spain started in 1990 with the creation of the National Institute for the Promotion of Social Economy (Instituto Nacional de Fomento de la Economía Social—INFES) through Law 31/1990 by Spain's Parliament on 27 December of that year. The INFES replaced the former Directorate General of Cooperatives and Worker-Owned Companies (Dirección General de Cooperativas y Sociedades Laborales) of the Spanish Ministry of Labour and Social Security. Among its purposes was the promotion of social economy organisations and, for that reason, it created the Institute from among its members. When the INFES ceased operating in the year 1997, its tasks were assumed by the General Directorate for the Promotion of Social Economy (Dirección General del Fomento de la Economía Social) and the European Social Fund. Law 27/1999 on Cooperatives, of 16 July 1999, incorporated the Council for the Promotion of the Social Economy as the advisory and consultative body for activities related to the social economy, and its regulations were implemented by Royal Decree 219/2001, of 2 March, to authorize the organization and operation of the Council. Thus, this Council is set up as the institution that provides visibility to the various organizations in the social economy.

Furthermore, and due to the decentralization of powers that characterizes Spain's territorial system, there are different substantive rules regarding the various entities in the social economy whose regulation falls within the scope of the regional governments, giving rise to the existence of similar institutions within each autonomous community of industry participants. The different forms of cooperatives and, among them, the ones of associated workers, consumers, housing, agricultural, services, seafarers, credit, education, health, insurance and transport cooperatives, worker-owned societies and associations, foundations and mutual societies, insertion companies, special employment centers, agricultural processing companies and fishermen's associations share the guiding principles of the social economy. All these organizations are covered, directly or indirectly, by the aforementioned articles of the Spanish Constitution. Their principles confer on them a distinct and specific character with regard to other types of commercial companies and organizations in Spain.

A national confederation of social economy enterprises was established in 1992, CEPES (Confederación Empresarial Española de Economía Social), to represent the interests of its membership and provide a platform for institutional dialogues with public authorities and the organization has matured through the political integration. Today, CEPES is a confederation with national scope and cross-sector membership and is recognized as an institution of the highest level in Spain's economy. Each year, the organization collects data and publishes several reports on the state of the social economy sector in both Spain and the Mediterranean. Comparative data of the Spanish social economy relative to similar sectors in other parts of the world are also reported.

=== Latin America ===
In Spanish-speaking Latin-American countries (such as Argentina, Venezuela and Cuba) the concept of economía social is accepted. The government of Hugo Chávez believed that the informal sector could be absorbed into the social economy of Venezuela by strictly controlling (or nationalising) large firms and creating new forms of private enterprise which were more accessible to the poor. Wage labour was seen as a source of exploitation, and the government hoped to reduce (or eliminate) it by promoting corporate governance, family and cooperative businesses and restricting labour contracts. The government planned to provide technology, training, finance and exclusive contracts to small enterprises so that they could survive in the national marketplace.

=== European Union ===
At the European level, the French concept predominates. In 1989, the Delors Commission established a Social Economy Unit to coordinate the movement at the European level; however, official texts adopted the term "Co-operatives, Mutuals, Associations and Foundations" (CMAFs). Social economy was one of the nine themes of the €3 billion EQUAL Community Initiative (2002-2008).

The European Economic and Social Committee has published a study drawn up by CIRIEC (International Centre of Research and Information on the Public, Social and Cooperative Economy) on the social economy in the European Union, available in the 23 official languages of the Union. A more recent study was carried out in 2017 focused on the emerging new concepts related to Social Economy and on the new public policies related to social economy.

The European Parliament established a Social Economy Intergroup (SEIG), integrating MEPs from 5 political groups and from 6 countries. Social Economy represents 2 million enterprises, including mutuals and cooperatives and employs over 14 million paid employees in the European Union.

In Ireland, the social economy is well-funded; an example is rural transport schemes to assist the socially disadvantaged in isolated locations.

=== United Kingdom ===
In the UK, the social enterprise movement is where the discussions of much of the social economy are centred, with a Social Economy Alliance created to support an ecosystem of social impact-focused businesses and charities. It is also a phrase used by the Labour Party to describe the economy surrounding social enterprises in the UK.

Until September 2021 there was a Minister for Civil Society, who was expressly responsible for social enterprise and social investment. Under the second Johnson ministry the role was merged with other responsibilities, now held by a lower-ranking minister.

=== New Zealand ===
In New Zealand, there is an Office for the Community & Voluntary Sector; however, a research programme is in progress as the Study of the NZ Non-Profit Sector.

=== United States ===
In the United States, rapid social change has led to shifts in both purpose and organizational forms of actors within the social economy. A diverse array of organizations, companies, constitute the social economy, including for-profit businesses, 501(c)(3) non-profits, cooperatives, credit unions, limited liability companies, social enterprises, and benefit corporations. Those which do not fit neatly into the aforementioned categories may be considered a hybrid organization. Some scholars define hybrids as organizations that maintain a social mission while pursuing profit, but others define them more specifically as for-profit ventures that operate to generate revenues for a partner nonprofit. Hybrids have primarily existed in sectors such as job training, health care, and microcredit, but have recently expanded to include environmentalism, technology, and even consulting. Organizational differences are acknowledged in the tax codes of several states with entities such as benefit corporations.

The Organisation for Economic Co-operation and Development (OECD) defines sectors differently, depending on the purpose. A sector can be a grouping of institutions, such as government (taxing authority), business (taxable profit-making), philanthropy (untaxed nonprofit), and household (taxable personal income). However, due to increasingly hybridized institutions within the social economy, their categorization may not clearly fit within the social enterprise compass. Designation may depend upon legal and financial structures, as well as the organization's purpose and goals. Policy makers may need to shift legal boundaries to adapt to this dynamic social economy.

The rise of the social economy, sometimes referred to as the fourth sector, began in the 1980s. Then-President Ronald Reagan drastically cut public spending, which significantly decreased the amount of funding non-profits received. Yet, as neoliberal shifts privatized what were previously public services, the non-profit sector became increasingly necessary to provide goods and services. The third sector blossomed; as of 1980, there were just 32,000 tax-exempt charitable organizations registered with the IRS, but by 2006, that number grew to over 600,000. Continued stagnation in funding throughout the late 1990s despite the growing number of nonprofits meant increased competition for the limited grants available to the third sector. As such, non-profits became increasingly entrepreneurial as a means of survival, giving rise to the social economy or so-called fourth sector. This "fourth sector" differs from the third sector by its location (in the United States) and its emphasis on business (as opposed to government) leadership. In the contemporary neoliberal socioeconomic and political environment, the United States' market-based mechanisms are emphasized in the social sector, such as within social entrepreneurship and venture philanthropy.

=== India ===
The cooperative movement in India has made remarkable progress, working more than 600,000 cooperatives and 250 million members, making it the largest cooperative movement of the world. Cooperatives have a huge network and unparalleled reach, with 100% coverage in 500,000 villages. Cooperatives play a pivotal role in the mainstream of Indian economy, particularly in the fields of agriculture & rural credit, distribution of agricultural inputs, storage, fertilizer, marketing, labour, micro finance and housing. and cooperatives are working towards inclusive growth, cooperative ideals and cooperative organization are more effective in meeting their people centered objectives. Cooperative provides third highest employment after private sector and government jobs. Social economy attempts to suitably blend economic feasibility with social reality. The cooperatives in India emphasize on equitable distribution of value amongst stakeholders.

== See also ==
- Civil society
- Cost the limit of price
- Mutualism (movement)
- Online volunteering
- Social innovation
- Solidarity economy
- Distributism
- Volunteerism
