= European Social Fund Plus =

Social fund managed by the European Union

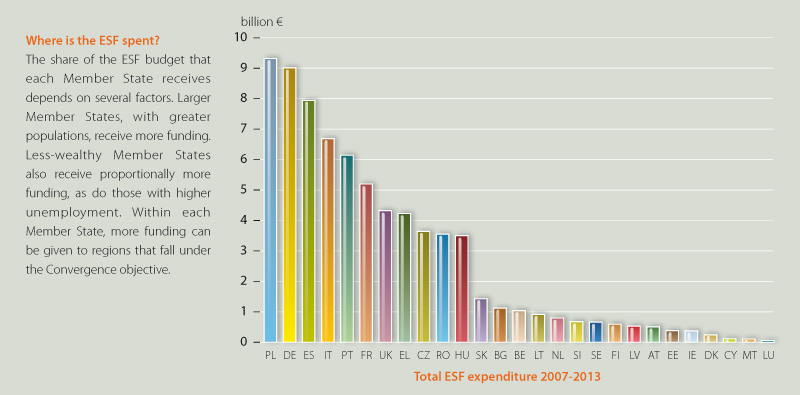
Spending allocation per country.

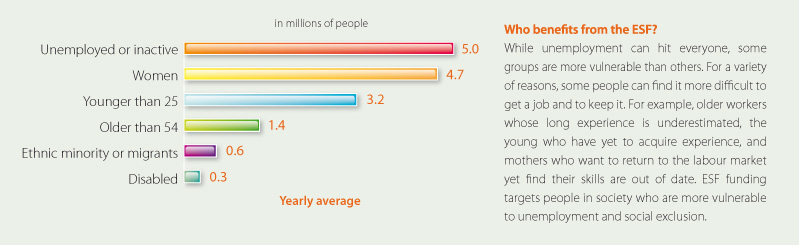
Spending by demographics.

The European Social Fund Plus (ESF+) is one of the European Structural and Investment Funds (ESIFs), which are dedicated to improving social cohesion and economic well-being across the regions of the Union. The funds are redistributive financial instruments that support cohesion within Europe by concentrating spending on the less-developed regions.

It is the European Union's main financial instrument for supporting employment in the member states of the European Union as well as promoting economic and social cohesion, created by merging the existing European Social Fund with the EU Fund for European Aid to the Most Deprived (FEAD) and the EU Programme for Employment and Social Innovation (EaSI) in 2021. ESF+ spending amounts to around 10% of the EU's total budget. The particular aim of ESF+ spending is to support the creation of more and better jobs in the EU, which it does by co-funding national, regional and local projects that improve the levels of employment, the quality of jobs, and the inclusiveness of the labour market in the member states and their regions.

== History ==
The European Social Fund was created in the founding Treaty of Rome in 1957. It is the oldest of the European Structural and Investment Funds. It was established as a "remedial instrument" against the end of nationalist protectionism due to the advent of the European Economic Community.

As of 2015, the main goal is to foster employment, reduce social exclusion and invest in skills. In some EU countries it also supports administrative reform.

It was transformed into the European Social Fund Plus (ESF+), which will run for the period 2021–2027 and have a total budget of €88 billion, by merging the existing European Social Fund with the EU Fund for European Aid to the Most Deprived (FEAD) and the EU Programme for Employment and Social Innovation (EaSI) in 2021.

== The place of the ESF in EU policies and strategies ==
The overarching strategy of the European Union is the Europe 2020 strategy, which aims to promote "smart, sustainable, inclusive growth" with greater coordination of national and European policies. In 2010 this succeeded the Lisbon Agenda which aimed to make Europe the most dynamic and competitive knowledge-based economy in the world, capable of sustainable economic growth with more and better jobs and greater social cohesion, and respect for the environment, by 2010. The objectives of Europe 2020 shape the priorities of the ESF.

In the light of the need to increase competitiveness and employment against a background of globalisation and ageing populations, the European Employment Strategy provides a coordinating framework for the Member States to agree common priorities and goals in the field of employment. These common priorities are then taken up in the Employment Guidelines and incorporated into the National Reform Programmes prepared by the individual Member States. ESF funding is deployed by the Member States in support of their National Reform Programmes as well as their National Strategic Reference Frameworks (NSRF) which establish a member state's main priorities for spending the EU Structural Funds it receives.

The European Social Agenda also plays a role in shaping the priorities of ESF spending. The Social Agenda seeks to update the 'European social model' by modernising labour markets and social protection systems so that workers and businesses can benefit from the opportunities created by international competition, technological advances and changing population patterns while protecting the most vulnerable in society. In addition, the concept of 'flexicurity' contributes to current ESF initiatives. Flexicurity can be defined as a policy strategy to enhance the flexibility of labour markets, work organisations and labour relations, on the one hand, and employment security and income security on the other. The term flexicurity encompasses a new approach to employment involving 'work for life' rather than the 'job for life' model of the past. It encourages workers to take charge of their working lives through lifelong training, adapting to change and mobility.

The EU is offering a guarantee of up to €13 billion until 2027 as part of the EFSD+ open architecture. In order to help partner nations reach the UN Sustainable Development Goals (SDGs), this is implemented through a variety of implementing partners, including international financial institutions and European development finance organisations.

== Strategy definition ==
The ESF is managed through seven-year programming cycles. The ESF strategy and budget is negotiated between the EU member states, the European Parliament and the EU Commission. The strategy defines the objectives of ESF funding, which it shares partly or wholly with other structural funding. For the current ESF funding cycle these objectives are:

1. The regional competitiveness and employment objective: to reinforce regional competitiveness, employment and attractiveness for investment.
2. The convergence objective: to stimulate growth and employment in the least-developed regions. This objective receives more than 80% of total ESF funding.

The strategy also lays down broad priority axes – the actions required to achieve the objectives and which are eligible for funding.

== Funds allocation ==
The level of ESF funding differs from one region to another depending on their relative wealth. EU regions are divided into four categories of eligible regions, based on their regional GDP per capita compared to the EU average (EU with 25 or 15 Member States) and split between the two objectives.

Convergence objective includes:

- convergence regions: with a GDP per capita of less than 75% of the EU-25 average;
- phasing-out regions: with a GDP per capita of more than 75% of the EU-25 average but less than 75% of the EU-15 average.

The regional competitiveness and employment objective includes:

- phasing-in regions: with a GDP per capita of less than 75% of the EU-15 average (in the period 2000–2006) but more than 75% of the EU-15 average (in the period 2007–2013);
- competitiveness and employment regions: applies to all other EU regions.

In convergence regions, ESF co-financing of projects can reach 85% of total costs. In regional competitiveness and employment regions, 50% co-financing is more common. For the richer Member States and regions, ESF funding complements existing national employment initiatives; for less-wealthy Member States, ESF funding can be the main source of funds for employment-related initiatives. The eligible regions for the current ESF programming round (2007–2013) are shown on the map.

While the allocation of funds to poorer regions intends to work towards the objective of convergence between regions (i.e. inter-regional equality), research has suggested that the funds may amplify intra-regional inequalities with for example in Poland richer municipalities receiving more funds than poorer municipalities within the regions. One explanation may lie in the co-financing procedures with poorer potential applicants being less likely to gather the required co-funding. Another issue with allocation has been that project applications have been rejected purely on minor administrative issues. While this has improved over time, research has shown that information provision and familiarity with application procedures is still a barrier in submitting applications for funds, and may play a larger role in than outright corruption in the selection process.

== Implementation ==
While strategy definition is done at EU level, implementation of ESF funding is the responsibility of EU Member States and regions. Once the strategy and budget allocation have been agreed, a shared approach to programming is taken. Seven-year Operational Programmes are planned by Member States and their regions together with the European Commission. These Operational Programmes describe the fields of activity that will be funded, which can be geographical or thematic.

The Member States designate national ESF management authorities that are responsible for selecting projects, disbursing funds, and evaluating the progress and results of projects. Certification and auditing authorities are also appointed to monitor and ensure compliance of expenditure to the ESF regulation.

Until 2007, approximately 5% of ESF funds were allocated to 'Community Initiatives' to support transnational and innovative actions. They have addressed such issues as employment for women (NOW), disabled people (INTEGRA) and young people, new professions and qualifications (EUROFORM) and adaptability (ADAPT). The most recent of these, the EQUAL Community Initiative, saw in the admission of 10 new Member States in 2004 but ended in 2008.

== ESF projects ==
The implementation of the ESF on the ground is achieved through projects which are applied for and implemented by a wide range of organisations, both in the public and private sector. These include national, regional and local authorities, educational and training institutions, non-governmental organisations (NGOs) and the voluntary sector, as well as social partners, for example, trade unions and works councils, industry and professional associations, and individual companies.

The beneficiaries of ESF projects are varied, for example, individual workers, groups of people, industrial sectors, trades unions, public administrations or individual firms. Vulnerable groups of people who have particular difficulty in finding work or getting on in their jobs, such as the long-term unemployed and women, are a particular target group. As an indication, it is estimated that over 9 million individuals from these vulnerable groups are helped each year through participation in ESF projects – see chart 1.

== Budget ==
=== European Social Fund, 2007–2013 ===
In the 2007 to 2013 cycle, ESF ran under the banner "Investing in People". Over this period, it invested around €75 billion – close to 10% of the EU budget – on employment-enhancing projects. Funding was given to six specific priority areas:

- Improving human capital (34% of total funding)
- Improving access to employment and sustainability (30%)
- Increasing the adaptability of workers and firms, enterprises and entrepreneurs (18%)
- Improving the social inclusion of less-favoured persons (14%)
- Strengthening institutional capacity at national, regional and local levels (3%)
- Mobilisation for reforms in the fields of employment and inclusion (1%)

In any given region, the actual distribution of funds varied to reflect local and regional priorities. All six priorities were applicable to both the convergence and regional competitiveness and employment objectives; however, convergence would normally place an emphasis on the 'improving human capital' priority.

=== European Social Fund, 2014–2020 ===
The 2014–2020 cycle had a total budget of €70 billion, 20% of which was dedicated to promoting social inclusion and decreasing poverty.

=== European Social Fund Plus, 2021–2027 ===
European Social Fund Plus (ESF+), created by merging the existing European Social Fund with the EU Fund for European Aid to the Most Deprived (FEAD) and the EU Programme for Employment and Social Innovation (EaSI), will run for the period 2021–2027 and have a total budget of €88 billion.

== See also ==
- Social fund
