= David Cappo =

Australian social justice advocate and Roman Catholic priest

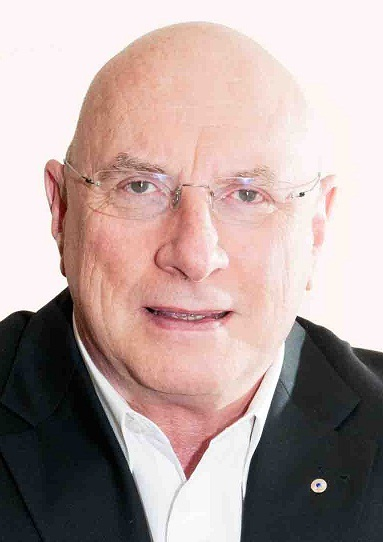
- Born: 2 November 1949 (age 77); Adelaide, South Australia

David Cappo AO (born 2 November 1949) is an Australian social justice advocate and Roman Catholic priest with particular interest in mental health care in developing countries. He is based in Adelaide, South Australia and Kampala, Uganda.

Cappo was previously the Social Inclusion Commissioner for the State of South Australia and later advised the Australian government on social policy and mental health reform. In 2007, he was appointed Officer of the Order of Australia for service to social inclusion in South Australia.

Cappo is currently co-founder and Chief Executive of YouBelong, a Ugandan-registered non-profit organisation working to strengthen fragile health systems and shift the focus of mental health care from institutional-based care to family and community-centred care.

== Early life and career ==
Cappo was born in Adelaide and educated at St Joseph's Primary School at Kingswood and at Rostrevor College.

While completing a Bachelor of Arts in Social Work at the South Australian Institute of Technology (now University of South Australia), Cappo worked as a community welfare officer in the areas of child protection, family support and juvenile offending.

Cappo was ordained a Catholic Priest in 1984, served as parish priest of Hectorville, South Australia, from 1996 to 2000 and became Vicar General of the Roman Catholic Archdiocese of Adelaide in 2000. In 2003 he was made a Prelate of Honour by Pope John Paul II, an appointment accompanied by the title of Monsignor.

== Government appointments ==
The then South Australian Premier Mike Rann appointed Cappo Chair of South Australia's Social Inclusion Board in 2002 and Social Inclusion Commissioner in 2006. His policy achievements in that role included:

- A reduction in rough sleeper homelessness in inner-city Adelaide by 50%
- An increase in school retention rates from 67.2% in 1999 to 84.2% in 2010
- A major reform of the mental health system known as a stepped system of care
- A blueprint for total reform of the disability system.

Cappo also served as an independent advisor to the Executive Committee of State Cabinet and a member of the South Australian Economic Development Board. He worked with the Government in directing the implementation of the South Australian Strategic Plan, with particular emphasis on social targets and outcomes, and produced an innovative form of joined up government that brought Government departments together to provide a more effective delivery of social inclusion programs.

This model received supportive comments from the World Health Organization (WHO) Social Determinants of Health Report 2008.

Cappo was appointed Deputy Chair of the national Social Inclusion Board in 2008 by then Australian Prime Minister Kevin Rudd. In 2010, Rudd's successor Julia Gillard appointed Cappo to a national role in mental health. In late 2011, Cappo stepped down from this position, and from his role with the Social Inclusion Board, after a political controversy sparked by allegations that he and Archbishop Philip Wilson failed to properly investigate allegations involving another South Australian priest in the 1960s. A subsequent investigation by a QC found there was no substance to the allegations.

== Work in East Africa ==
In 2016, Cappo co-founded Uganda-based YouBelong with Dr. Byamah Brian Mutamba, a Ugandan senior psychiatrist.

YouBelong Uganda works closely with the Ugandan Ministry of Health to support programs designed to bring about mental health reform in East Africa, and works to enhance the emotional wellbeing and mental health of school children in Jinja, Uganda, in partnership with the Jinja Educational Trust.

YouBelong Uganda is funded through philanthropic donations and a research grant from the Wellcome Trust.

In October 2023 Cappo presented the mental health innovations of YouBelong Uganda at the World Health Summit in Berlin as part of a session dedicated to Mental Health for All.

== Academic appointments ==
From 2012 to 2018, Cappo was a senior research fellow in the School of Social and Policy Studies at Flinders University in South Australia.

In 2024, he was appointed an Adjunct Professor in the School of Arts and Sciences, Notre Dame University, Fremantle WA Campus (20), where he focusses on models of social justice and human rights in low income countries.
