= Mike Rann =

Australian politician (born 1953)

The Honourable Mike Rann AC CNZM
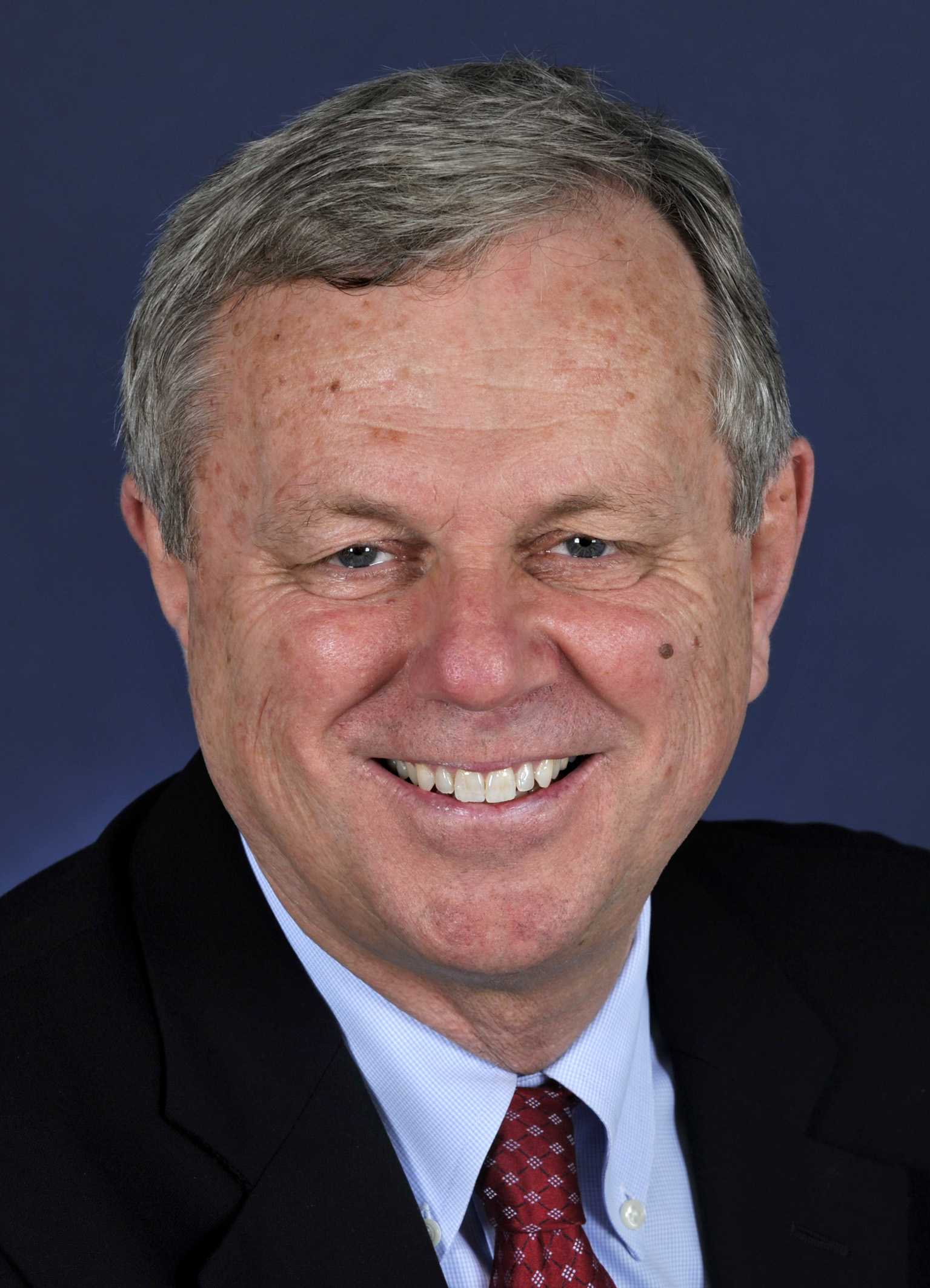
- Official portrait, 2012

Australian Ambassador to Italy, Albania, Libya and San Marino
- In office 27 June 2014 – 8 January 2016
- Preceded by: David Ritchie
- Succeeded by: Greg French

Australian High Commissioner to the United Kingdom
- In office 23 August 2012 – 31 March 2014
- Preceded by: John Dauth
- Succeeded by: Alexander Downer

44th Premier of South Australia
- In office 5 March 2002 – 21 October 2011
- Monarch: Elizabeth II
- Governor: Marjorie Jackson-Nelson; Kevin Scarce
- Deputy: Kevin Foley; John Rau
- Preceded by: Rob Kerin
- Succeeded by: Jay Weatherill
Other offices held
National President of the Labor Party
In office 27 February 2008 – 27 December 2008
Preceded by	John Faulkner
Succeeded by	Linda Burney
Leader of the Opposition in South Australia
In office 20 September 1994 – 5 March 2002
Deputy	Ralph Clarke; Annette Hurley
Preceded by	Lynn Arnold
Succeeded by	Rob Kerin
Leader of the South Australian Labor Party
In office 20 September 1994 – 21 October 2011
Deputy	Ralph Clarke; Annette Hurley; Kevin Foley; John Rau
Preceded by	Lynn Arnold
Succeeded by	Jay Weatherill
Deputy Leader of the South Australian Labor Party
In office 14 December 1993 – 20 September 1994
Leader	Dr. Lynn Arnold
Preceded by	Frank Blevins
Succeeded by	Ralph Clarke
Minister for Business and Tourism
In office 1 October 1992 – 14 December 1993
Preceded by	Barbara Wiese
Succeeded by	Graham Ingerson
Minister of Employment and Further Education, Minister of Youth and Aboriginal Affairs
In office 14 December 1989 – 1 October 1992
Preceded by	Terry Hemmings
Succeeded by	Kym Mayes
Member of the South Australian House of Assembly
In office 7 December 1985 – 13 January 2012
Preceded by	district established (Briggs); Lynn Arnold (Ramsay)
Succeeded by	district abolished (Briggs); Zoe Bettison (Ramsay)
Constituency	Briggs (1985–1993); Ramsay (1993–2012)

Personal details
- Born: Michael David Rann; 5 January 1953 (age 73) Sidcup, Kent, England, United Kingdom (now London, England)
- Party: Australian Labor Party (SA)
- Other political affiliations: New Zealand Labour Party (1970s)
- Spouse(s): Jenny Russell (divorced); Sasha Carruozzo (2006–present)
- Education: Northcote College
- Alma mater: University of Auckland
- Profession: Journalist

Michael David Rann AC CNZM (born 5 January 1953) is an Australian former politician and diplomat who was the 44th premier of South Australia from 2002 to 2011. He was later Australian High Commissioner to the United Kingdom from 2013 to 2014, and Australian ambassador to Italy, Albania, Libya and San Marino from 2014 to 2016.

Rann grew up in the United Kingdom and New Zealand, completing a Bachelor and Master of Arts in political science at the University of Auckland. Before entering Parliament, Rann worked as an advisor to South Australian Labor Parliamentarians.

Rann became leader of the South Australian Branch of the Australian Labor Party and South Australian Leader of the Opposition in 1994 and led the party to minority government at the 2002 election. He resigned as Premier in October 2011 and was succeeded by Jay Weatherill. Rann is the third-longest serving Premier of South Australia behind Thomas Playford IV and John Bannon and served a record 17 years as South Australian Labor parliamentary leader from 1994 to 2011. He was a South Australian MP in the House of Assembly from the 1985 election and Father of the House from the 2010 election until his parliamentary resignation on 13 January 2012.

== Early life ==
Rann was born in Sidcup, Kent, England, now part of the Greater London metropolitan area. His father was an electrician who had served at El Alamein in World War II. His mother was employed in an armaments factory. Most of Rann's childhood was spent in the care of his father in South London. In 1962, when he was nine, his family emigrated from Blackfen to Mangakino, a small town north of Taupō on the Waikato River in New Zealand. His family then moved to Matamata, then to Birkenhead, New Zealand on Auckland's North Shore where he attended Northcote College.

He completed a Bachelor and a Master of Arts in political science at the University of Auckland. He was Vice President of the New Zealand Campaign for Nuclear Disarmament and editor of the student newspaper Craccum. As a member of Princes Street Labour, he also spent considerable time working on New Zealand Labour Party campaigns including that of Mike Moore. After university, Rann was a political journalist for the New Zealand Broadcasting Corporation. Haydon Manning has stated that "it was reported that" Rann "struggled with being an objective reporter".

Rann visited his brother Chris in Adelaide, South Australia during 1977, moving to the city to carry out a position with then Premier Don Dunstan's Industrial Democracy Unit. He subsequently worked as Dunstan's press secretary, speech writer and adviser, and went on to serve Labor premiers Des Corcoran and John Bannon after Dunstan's retirement from politics. Manning has stated that one commentator reported that Rann was "frankly inspired by Dunstan's idealism" as opposed to "Bannon's cool electoral pragmatism". Rann sometimes talked during this period of his ambitions to one day become Premier himself. Meanwhile, Rann wrote speeches on and assisted in policy development for, civil liberties, Aboriginal land rights, women's rights, and opposition to uranium mining. Revealing a vein of idealism, his early predilection was left of centre.

== Parliament ==
Rann was elected to Parliament as the Member for the safe Labor seat of Briggs in north Adelaide at the 1985 election. After the 1989 election, he entered the ministry, becoming Minister for Employment and Further Education, Minister of Youth Affairs, Minister of Aboriginal Affairs and Minister assisting in Ethnic Affairs.

As Minister for Employment and Further Education he established the Kickstart employment scheme, the South Australian Youth Conservation Corps, presided over a large expansion of TAFE, and signed an agreement in 1992 between Le Cordon Bleu, the Swiss Hotel Association, and the Regency College of TAFE to establish an international hospitality and cooking school, with Le Cordon Bleu school established at the Regency Park location. He introduced the legislation in 1991 to establish the new University of South Australia, now the biggest university in the state. As a member of the Australian Education Council he played a key role in 1992 in the creation of ANTA, the Australian National Training Authority, with shared funding of TAFE by Federal as well as state governments. As Minister of Aboriginal Affairs he campaigned for a clean-up of Maralinga lands affected by nuclear tests in the 1950s and legislated in 1991 to return the sacred Ooldea lands to the Maralinga Tjarutja people. As Minister of Tourism he legislated in 1993 to establish the South Australian Tourism Commission and had ministerial responsibility for the Australian Formula One Grand Prix.

Labor lost government at the 1993 election in a landslide due to the State Bank collapse, falling to only 10 seats. After the election, Rann was first elected as Deputy Leader of the Opposition under Lynn Arnold. However, when Arnold resigned a few months later, Rann succeeded him as Parliamentary Leader of the Opposition in September 1994. As Opposition Leader Rann launched a "Labor Listens" strategy designed to re-connect with voters and vigorously opposed the privatisation of water services and electricity assets. Assisted by Liberal government leaks he exploited their internal divisions. Following the ousting of Premier Dean Brown by John Olsen, Rann released a series of damaging Cabinet documents and was involved in a prolonged and bitter legal battle with Premier Olsen.

Rann went into the 1997 election as a decided underdog. However, he turned the campaign into a "referendum on privatisation." Under Rann's leadership, Labor regained much of what it had lost in its severe defeat of four years earlier. Labor picked up a massive 9.4 percent swing, still the largest against a sitting government on record in South Australia. It also more than doubled its seat count compared to 1993, and actually came within three seats of making Rann premier. Olsen was forced into a minority government, supported by the Nationals and independents.

== Premier (2002–2011) ==
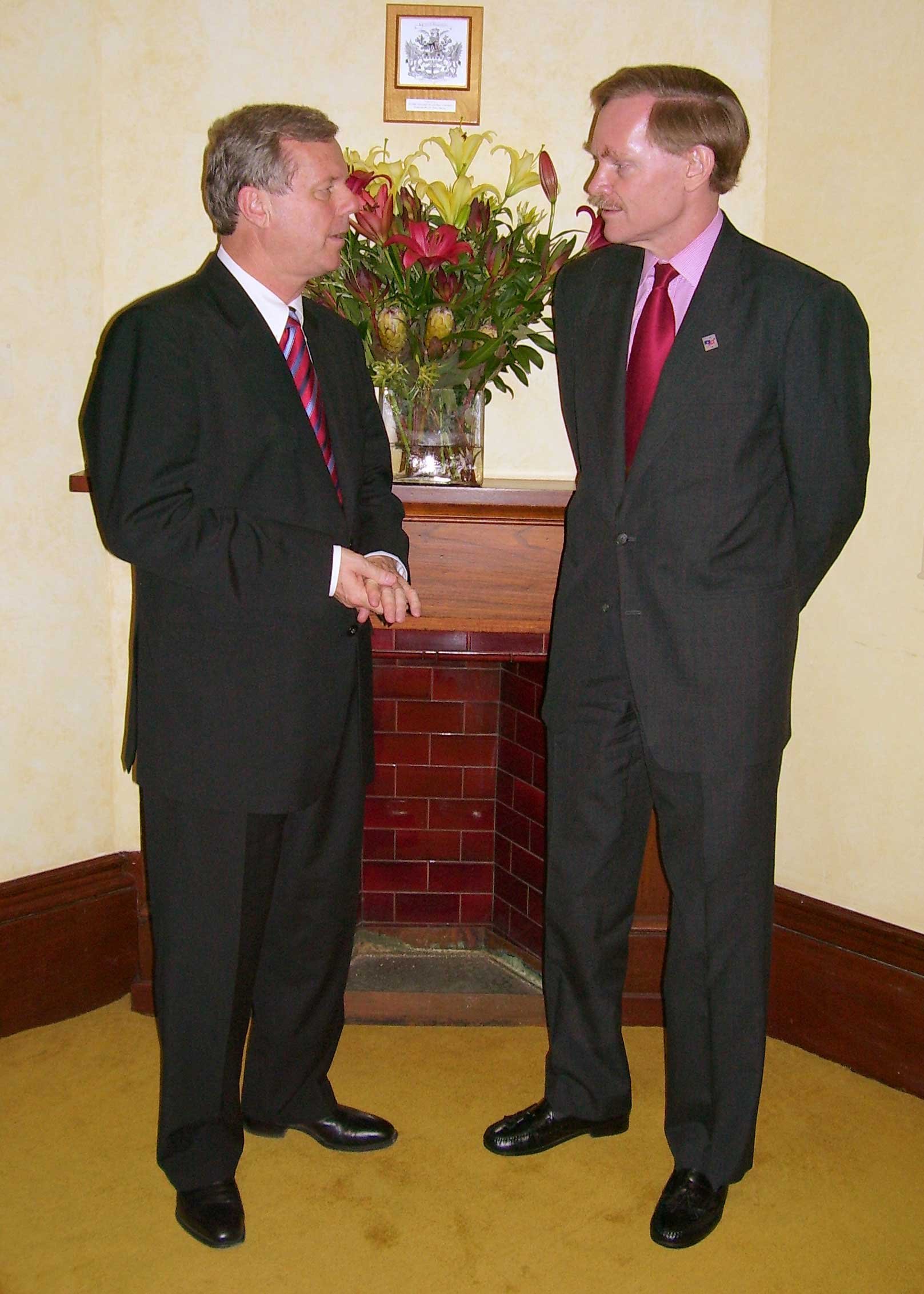
Rann (left) with former US Deputy Secretary of State Robert Zoellick (right) in 2005.

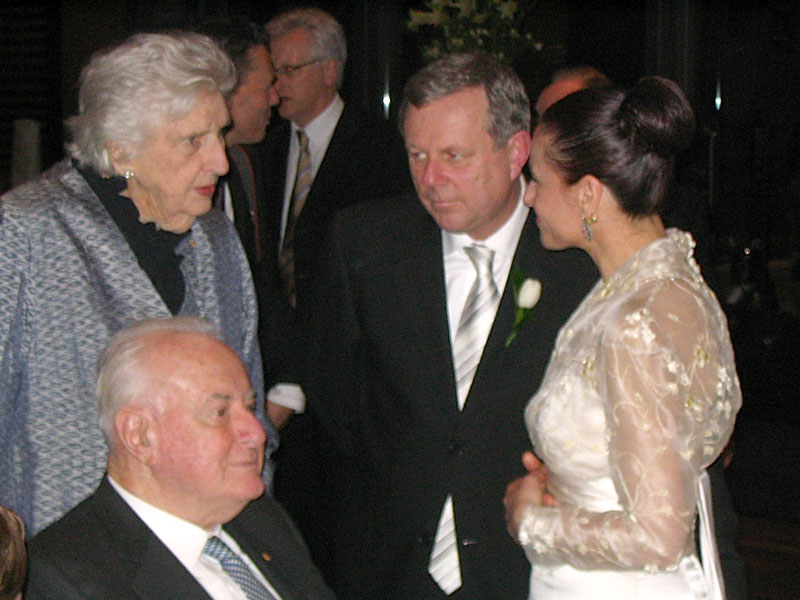
Former Prime Minister of Australia Gough Whitlam with wife Margaret at the wedding of Rann and Sasha Carruozzo in 2006.

Rann remained Leader of the Opposition until the 2002 election. The Labor opposition took two seats from the Liberals. This left Labor one short of majority government while the Liberals were four seats short. Despite this, it initially appeared Rob Kerin, who had succeeded Olsen as premier in 2001, would remain in office with the support of four conservative-leaning independents. However, one of those independents, former Liberal Peter Lewis, agreed to support Labor in return for a constitutional convention and being named Speaker. On paper, this allowed Rann to form government by one seat. In response, Kerin announced that in accordance with precedent set by Don Dunstan three decades earlier, he would stay in office until Labor demonstrated it had support on the floor of the House of Assembly. He argued that since the Liberals had won a bare majority of the two-party vote, he still had a mandate to govern. Three weeks of deadlock ended when the new legislature met for the first time. With Lewis presiding, Kerin proposed a motion of confidence in his government. The motion failed, and Kerin's government immediately resigned. Rann then advised the Governor, Marjorie Jackson-Nelson that he could form a government, which was duly sworn in the next day. Rann later secured the support of conservative independent Rory McEwen and the Nationals' Karlene Maywald by adding them to his cabinet. He also agreed to back Liberal-turned-independent Bob Such as Speaker after Lewis retired.

In addition to Premier, Rann also served as the Minister for Economic Development, Minister for Social Inclusion, Minister for the Arts, and Minister for Sustainability and Climate Change. Rann was appointed chairman of a new Australian Federation Council in July 2006, a council which was created to improve state-federal ties. Rann also ran for the national presidency of the ALP in the ALP National Executive in August 2006, and made senior-vice president with 27 percent of the vote. As such, he also served a rotation of the Presidency of the ALP National Executive in 2008.

=== Popularity in earlier years ===
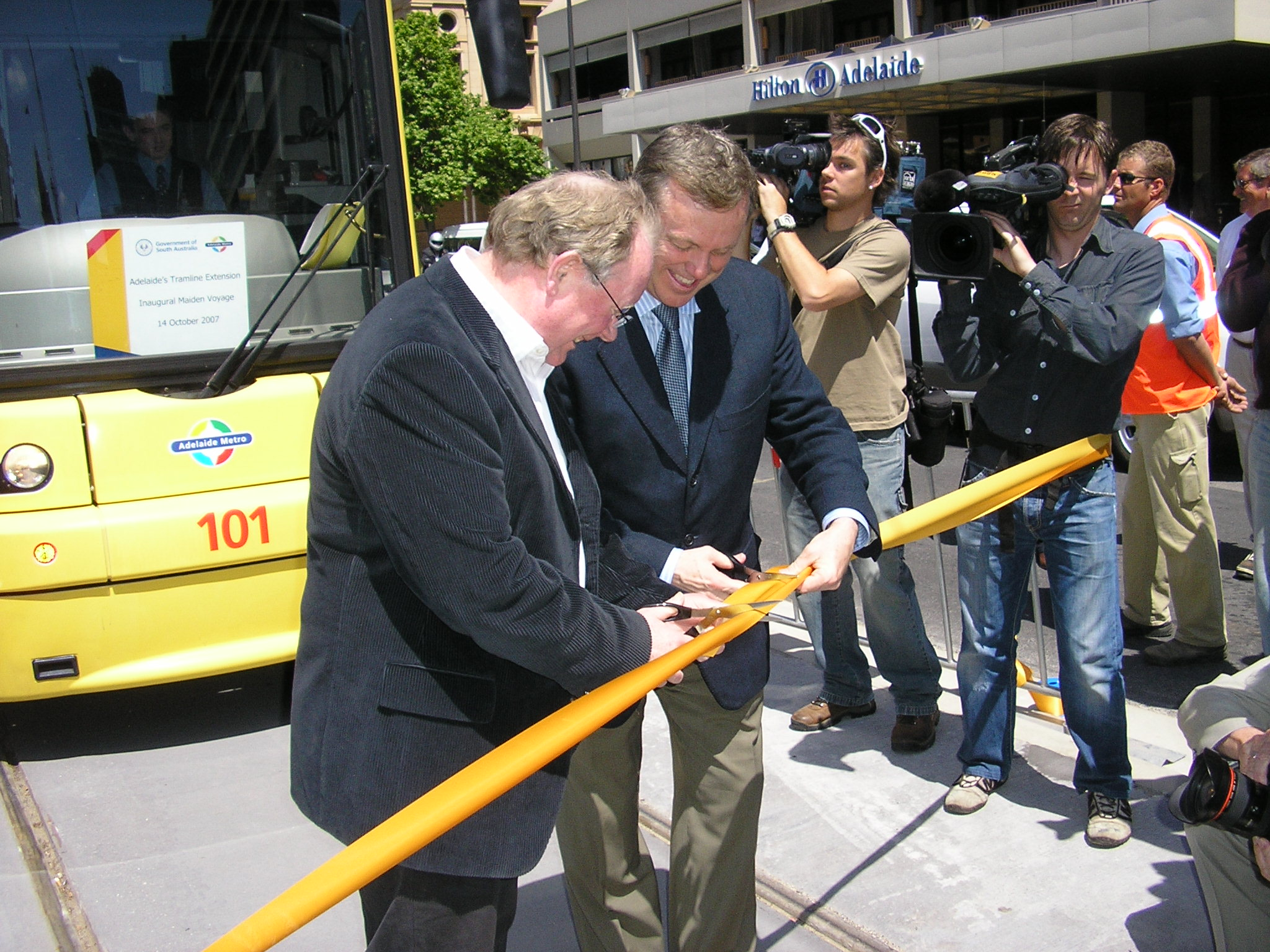
Rann (right) with Minister for Transport Pat Conlon (left) opening the extension of the Glenelg tram line in 2007.

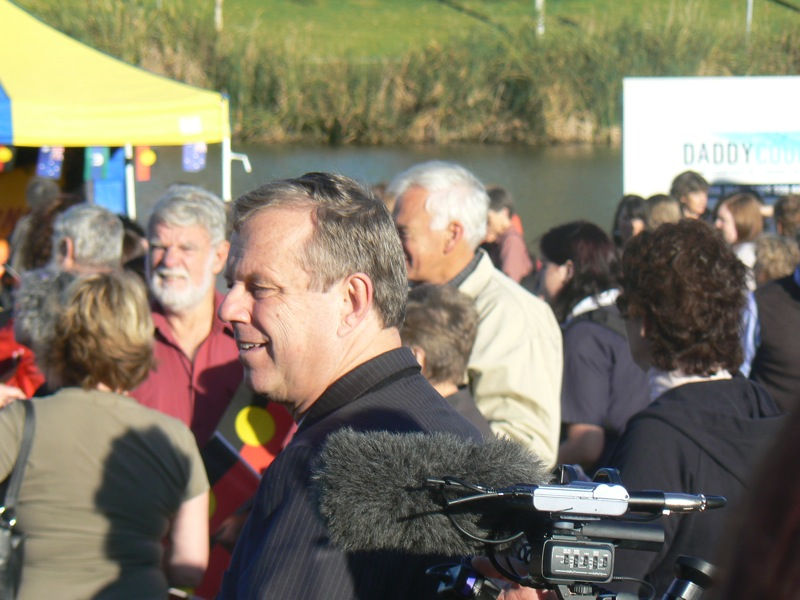
Rann at National Sorry Day in Elder Park, Adelaide, for the apology to the stolen generations in 2008.

Rann's earlier achievements included raising job numbers and lowering unemployment, increasing new project funding, increasing expenditure on schools, university, health and mental illness, halving rough-sleeping in the streets, making the state home to the largest amount of wind power in Australia, developing hot rock power, and utilising solar power for the public service. South Australia's debt achieved a AAA rating under the Rann Labor government, prompting Business SA chief executive Peter Vaughan to praise Labor's economic management.

Rann subsidised theatres, added Guggenheim galleries, introduced the Festival of Ideas and Adelaide's Thinker in Residence program, and encouraged the idea that film festivals fund movies, leading to the creation of the Adelaide Film Festival and establishing the Adelaide Film Festival Investment Fund as backing. He provided the funding to make three major festivals annual rather than biennial: WOMADelaide (from 2003), the Adelaide Fringe (from 2007) and the Adelaide Festival of Arts (from 2012) .

Rann was comfortably re-elected in 2006, taking 28 seats to the Liberals' 15—to date, Labor's largest majority since the abolition of the Playmander. Labor also garnered a two-party vote of 56.8 percent, a significant comeback from its low of 39 percent in 1993 under Arnold.

Rann personally likened his government to Dunstan's, stating "I'm a totally different person to Don Dunstan, but in the 70s for different reasons South Australia stood head and shoulders above the crowd. We stood out, we were leaders. The federal government is setting up a social inclusion unit based on ours. Again it's about us not only making a difference locally, but being a kind of model for others, which is what Dunstan used to say he wanted us to be ... a laboratory and a leader for the future." Rann says he expected other reforms to be based upon those enacted under his government, citing the state's strategic plan, a 10-year framework for the development of government and business. "It's a plan for the state, not just promises at each election. A lot of colleagues interstate thought I'd gone mad when we named targets. Well we didn't want to set targets we could easily pass and then pat ourselves on the back for, what's the point of that?" A total of 79 economic and social targets were set, and in 2010 Rann commented "with most of its targets achieved, on track or within reach". However, the state's Integrated Design Commissioner, Tim Horton, said in 2011: "Its targets are really great, but I don't think any of us have signed on to why those targets exist or what we can do to further them. It's a top-down approach. I worry the document exists in the minds of agencies but not in the minds of people."

During Rann's first and second terms, Rann was often the most popular Premier in the country, with his approach to government generally moderate and crisis-free. Newspoll early in 2007 saw Rann peak at a historic 64 per cent as Preferred Premier, and 61 per cent on the two-party-preferred vote. University of Adelaide Professor of Politics Clem Macintyre said that after the State Bank collapse, Rann had to re-establish Labor's credentials as an economic manager as a matter of urgency, and "in that sense Rann had a whole lot of priorities to concentrate on that Dunstan didn't even think about", with a legacy built on economic achievements, achieving the triple-A credit rating, as well as its capacity to deliver infrastructure projects.

Fourth quarter 2007 polling saw a reduction in the strong support for Rann's Labor government since the previous election, on 54 percent of the two-party-preferred vote, a fall from the previous poll of five percent. Rann's Preferred Premier rating was at 50 percent compared to 25 percent for then Liberal leader Martin Hamilton-Smith. Third quarter 2008 polling saw a more pronounced drop in the primary vote, down three to 38 percent, with the Liberal vote up five to 40 percent, breaking to a two-party vote of 50–50 after preferences – the Preferred Premier figure recorded a six-point drop to 48 percent for Rann and up three to 30 percent for Hamilton-Smith. Some commentators put the poll slump down to "labour movement ructions" over the underfunded WorkCover liability (see 2008 Parnell–Bressington filibuster), consolidation of rural health services, and the continued degradation of the River Murray.

Newspoll saw Labor back in a winning position on 54 to 46 in late 2008, and then 56 to 44 in early 2009 along with increases in the Preferred Premier rating. Polling taken from The Sunday Mail during the 50-50 polling suggested that whilst there had been large swings away from the government in country areas, polling held relatively firm at 2006 election levels in the metropolitan areas.

The 2009 Frome by-election saw Labor pick up a small increase in the two-party-preferred vote. This, coupled with the "dodgy documents affair", also known as "dodgy-gate", saw Hamilton-Smith step down from the Liberal leadership, to be replaced by Isobel Redmond.

=== Affair allegations ===
On 22 November 2009, Seven Network's Sunday Night current affairs program aired a paid television interview alleging that Rann had an affair with Michelle Chantelois, a Parliament House barmaid, between March 2004 and October 2005.

Rann commented before the interview went to air that claims of a sexual relationship were "wildly sensational", and that once he had seen the program, he would respond with a "brief statement". He also expressed frustration that he had been unable to "clear the air" because matters were before a court. The day after the allegations were aired, Rann called a press conference where he explicitly denied the allegations made in the interview, claimed the program was outrageous, and stated the claims were malicious lies aimed at damaging him politically and personally.

An out-of-court settlement was paid by Seven Network to Rann in February 2010 and with an apology issued for suggesting the affair had an effect on Rann discharging his duties as Premier of South Australia. Polling was conducted by The Advertiser in December 2009 with answers to questions revealing little voter interest in the allegations. Others suggested that it was the turning point for Rann's decline, with the issue causing indirect damage over a sustained period of time.

He was also assaulted over this. The husband of Chantelois punched Mike Rann at the National Wine Centre.

=== Third term ===
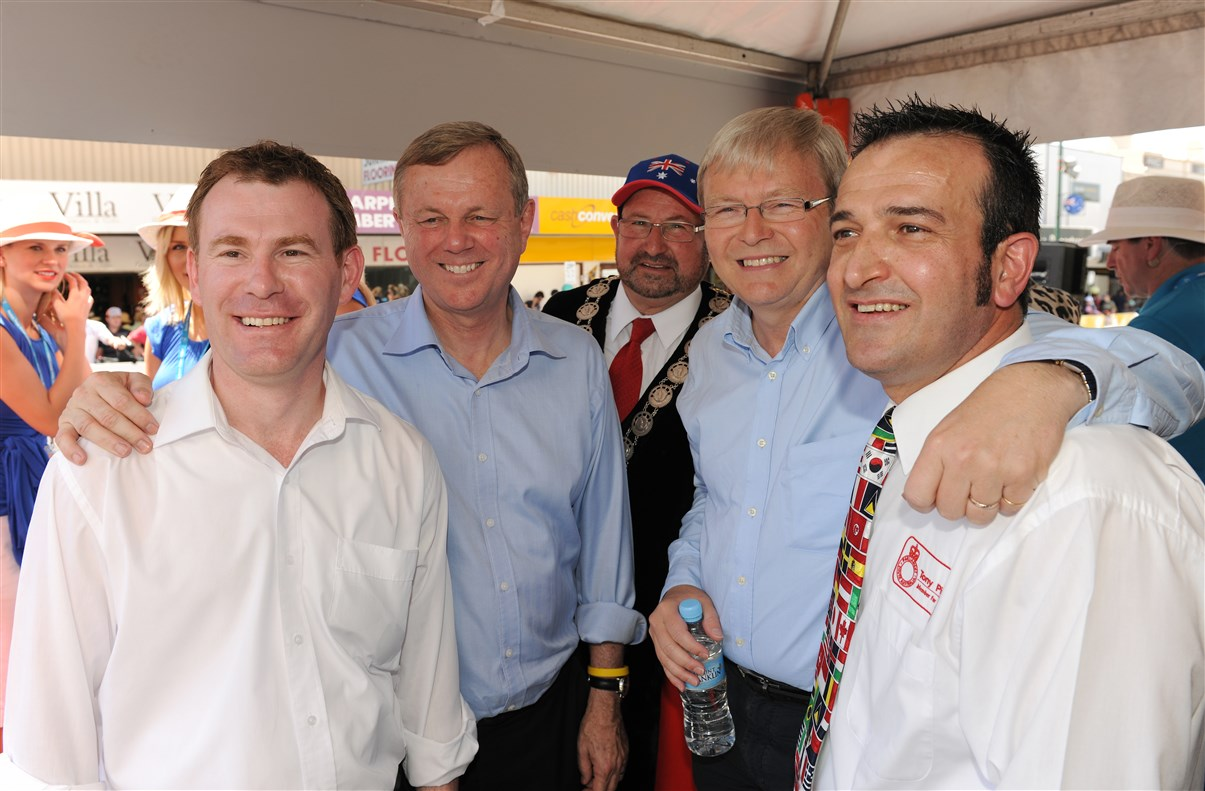
Labor MP Nick Champion, Rann, Prime Minister Kevin Rudd and Tony Piccolo in Gawler for the Tour Down Under in 2010.

The Rann Labor government won a third four-year term at the 2010 state election with 26 of 47 seats though with only 48.4 percent of the two-party preferred vote. It was the first Rann Labor election campaign that took to YouTube and social networking. As Labor held government until the 2014 state election, with four-year terms, it is the longest-serving period of a South Australian Labor government in history. Rann also served as Labor leader since 1994, a record period as Labor leader.

New and continued projects for Rann Labor's third term were claimed to be the biggest infrastructure spend in the state's history, which included rail electrification of Adelaide's train lines, expansion of the Adelaide tram line, construction of the new Royal Adelaide Hospital, the Adelaide Oval redevelopment, expansion of the Adelaide Convention Centre, redesigning the River Torrens Riverbank precinct, expanding mining and defence industries, the Port Stanvac Desalination Plant, and continued various major road works including various upgrades to the North–South Corridor.

Rann conceded that public sector budget cuts introduced in the 2010 budget were not popular, but said that 2011 would bring new activities, such as progress on the multi-billion Olympic Dam expansion, after it had been delayed by the 2008 financial crisis. The cuts caused protest amongst unionists, but Rann defeated a motion against his leadership at the yearly Labor convention in 2010.

In early 2011, Rann reshuffled his cabinet after Deputy Premier and Treasurer Kevin Foley resigned from both positions but remained in the cabinet. Attorney-General John Rau became Deputy Premier and Jack Snelling became Treasurer.

The first Newspoll of the third term of the Rann Labor government in March 2011 showed Rann's personal satisfaction-dissatisfaction rating at a new low of 30–59 and a two-party vote of 44–56, a swing against Labor of 4.4 percent since the 2010 election. Labor's primary vote dived to 29 percent, down 8.5 percent, the Liberal vote remained at 42 percent, whilst the Greens surged to 14 percent, an increase of 6 percent, with "other" slightly higher. The subsequent Newspoll saw the two-party vote narrow to 46–54, a swing against Labor of just 2.4 percent, however there was no statistical change in Rann's personal satisfaction-dissatisfaction ratings.

In late July 2011, the Australian Broadcasting Corporation (ABC) and The Advertiser reported that senior figures within Labor had indicated to Rann that the state party's left and right factions had formally decided to replace Rann with Education Minister Jay Weatherill as party leader. A day later, Rann confirmed he would stand down and undergo a party leadership transition to Weatherill, with the handover occurring in October 2011.

Rann formally resigned from the premiership on 21 October 2011, and Weatherill was elected unopposed as his successor.

Rann resigned from parliament on 13 January 2012 which created an 11 February 2012 Ramsay by-election. Zoe Bettison easily retained the seat for Labor with only a slight swing against her, and Ramsay remained the safest of Labor's lower house seats.

== Post-parliamentary career ==
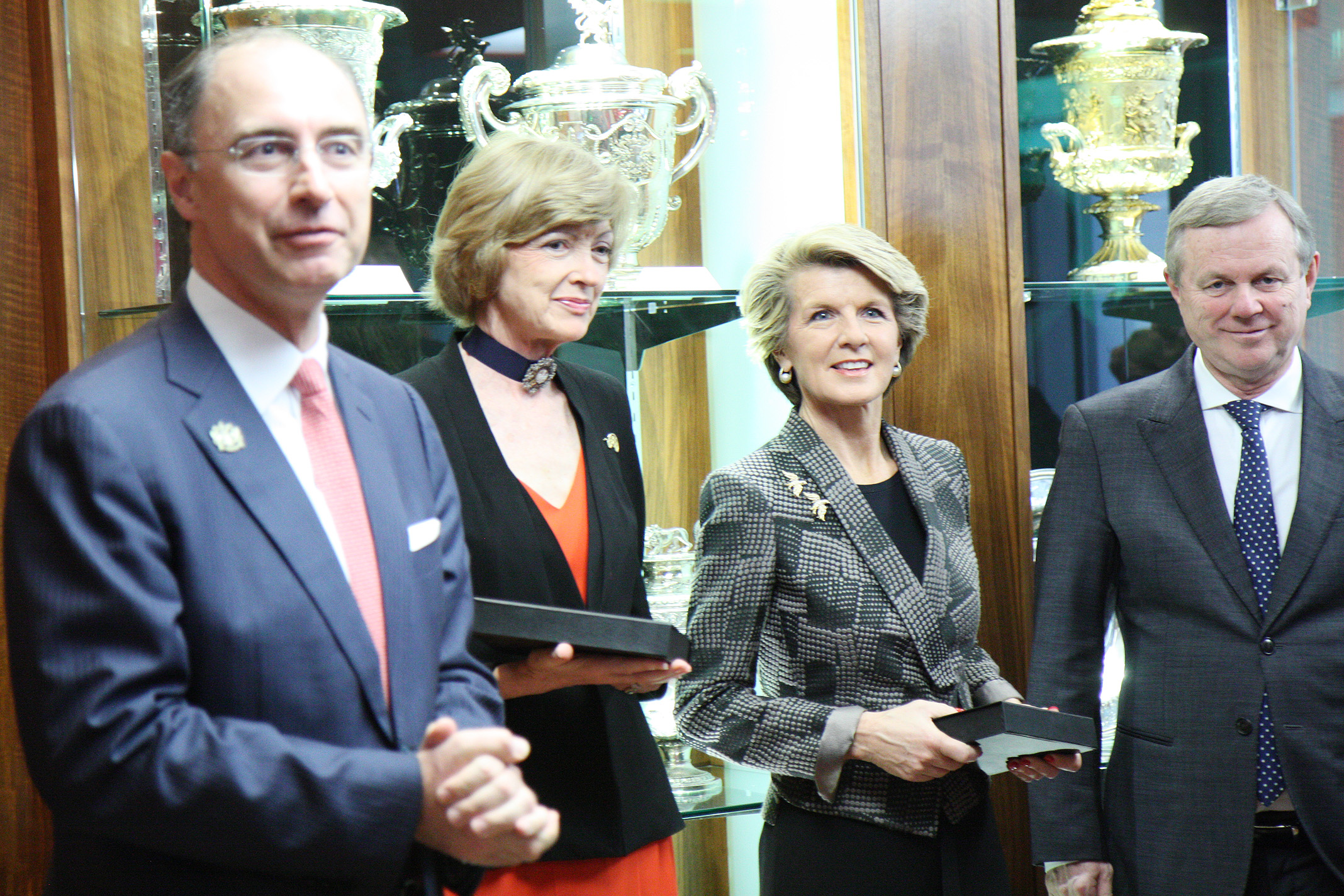
Rann (right) with Foreign Minister Julie Bishop (second right) at the London Stock Exchange in 2014.

Rann's post-parliamentary appointments include the new Urban Policy Forum created by the federal government, as a professor in the School of Social and Policy Studies with Flinders University and as a visiting fellowship in political studies at the University of Auckland. He has also joined the International Leadership Council of The Climate Group, and the International Advisory Board of the Ecological Sequestration Trust. Rann was also appointed adjunct professor in public policy at Carnegie Mellon University, Fellow for Democracy and Development at the Washington, D.C.-based Center for National Policy and as member of the Council of the Royal Institution of Australia.

Rann was appointed chair of Low Carbon Australia Pty Ltd in early 2012, the federal government's "green bank" providing finance to companies to reduce carbon emissions and to the International Leadership Council of The Climate Group.

Rann was announced on 23 August 2012 as the next Australian High Commissioner to the United Kingdom. Rann also assumed the role of Permanent Representative to the United Nations International Maritime Organisation, Commonwealth War Graves Commissioner and Trustee of the Imperial War Museum. Mike Rann acted as Australia's Ambassador to Italy, San Marino, Albania and Libya. He is also Australia's Permanent Representative to the United Nations' Food and Agriculture Organization and World Food Programme.

As of 2020, he works as a business consultant for the Rann Strategy Group.

In 2022, Rann joined the board of directors of Spacetalk.

== Personal life ==
Rann was married to Jenny Russell until the late 1990s and had two children with her, David and Eleanor. On 15 July 2006, he married his second wife, actress Sasha Carruozzo. It was revealed in December 2011 that she was undergoing treatment for breast cancer.

In 2016, Rann's son, David, was appointed media advisor to South Australian Treasurer Tom Koutsantonis.

In 2020, Rann announced that he intended to purchase an apartment in Adelaide and that he would then live six months of the year in Adelaide, and the other six in Puglia, Italy, where he would produce olive oil.

== Honours ==
Orders

- 26 January 2016: Companion of the Order of Australia (AC) "For eminent service to the Parliament and the community of South Australia, particularly as Premier, through broad-ranging policy design and implementation, and to the advancement of Australia's diplomatic, trade and cultural relationships.".

Medals

- (Australia) 1 January 2001: Centenary Medal.

Foreign honours

- 2005: Commander's Cross of the Order of Merit of the Republic of Poland (Poland)
- 2007: Grand Cross of the Order of the Phoenix (Greece)
- 2009: Companion of the New Zealand Order of Merit (CNZM) for services to New Zealand – Australian relations, in the 2009 New Year Honours.

Organisations

- (India) 2010: Global Champion of Climate Change by Indian environmental NGO Exnora International.

== See also ==
- Premier's Climate Change Council
- Rann government

Parliament of South Australia
New district	Member for Briggs; 1985–1993	District abolished
Preceded by Lynn Arnold	Member for Ramsay; 1993–2012	Succeeded by Zoe Bettison
Political offices
Preceded by Kym Mayes	Minister of Employment and Further Education; 1989–1992	Succeeded by Bob Gregory as Minister of Labour Relations and Occupational Health and Safety
Preceded by Kym Mayes	Minister of Youth Affairs; 1989–1992	Vacant Title next held by Bob Such as Minister for Youth Affairs
Preceded by Terry Hemmings	Minister of Aboriginal Affairs; 1989–1992	Succeeded by Kym Mayes
Vacant Title last held by John Bannon	Minister Assisting the Minister of Ethnic Affairs; 1989–1992	Office abolished
Preceded by Anne Levy	Minister of State Services; 1992–1993	Succeeded by Bob Gregory
Preceded by Barbara Wiese as Minister of Small Business	Minister of Business and Regional Development; 1992–1993	Succeeded by John Olsen as Minister for Industry, Manufacturing, Small Business and Regional Development
Preceded by Lynn Arnold as Minister of State Development	Minister of Business and Regional Development; 1992–1993	Succeeded by John Olsen as Minister for Industry, Manufacturing, Small Business and Regional Development
Preceded by Barbara Wiese	Minister of Tourism; 1992–1993	Succeeded by Graham Ingerson
Preceded by Stephen Baker	Deputy Leader of the Opposition of South Australia; 1993–1994	Succeeded by Ralph Clarke
Preceded by Lynn Arnold	Leader of the Opposition of South Australia; 1994–2002	Succeeded by Rob Kerin
Preceded by Rob Kerin	Premier of South Australia; 2002–2011	Succeeded by Jay Weatherill
Preceded by Robert Brokenshire	Minister for Volunteers; 2002–2006	Succeeded by Jennifer Rankine
Preceded by Diana Laidlaw	Minister for The Arts; 2002–2011	Succeeded by John Hill
New title	Minister for Economic Development; 2002–2011	Succeeded by Jay Weatherill as Minister for State Development
New title	Minister for Social Inclusion; 2004–2011	Succeeded by Ian Hunter as Minister for Communities and Social Inclusion
New title	Minister for Sustainability and Climate Change; 2006–2011	Succeeded by Paul Caica as Minister for Sustainability, Environment and Conservation
Party political offices
Preceded by Lynn Arnold	Leader of the Australian Labor Party (SA Branch); 1994–2011	Succeeded by Jay Weatherill
Diplomatic posts
Preceded by John Dauth	Australian High Commissioner to the United Kingdom; 2013–2014	Succeeded by Alexander Downer
Preceded by David Ritchie	Australian Ambassador to Italy; 2014–2016	Succeeded by Greg French
