= Transnationality =

Transnationality is the principle of acting at a geographical scale larger than that of states, so as to take into account the interests of a supranational entity.

Transnational policies or programmes are not simply aggregations of national policies or programmes, but seek to submerge these within a greater whole. According to Aihwa Ong, the term differs from that of transnationalism, as transnationalism refers "to the cultural specificities of global processes, tracing the multiplicity of the uses and conceptions of 'culture'" whereas transnationality is "the condition of cultural interconnectedness and mobility across space".

Transnationality is practised by organisations such as the United Nations and the European Union. The EU's principle of subsidiarity holds that actions should be carried out at the lowest feasible governmental level, and therefore much scope is left to individual Member States. The EU institutions thus concern themselves principally with transnational policies and actions.

== See also ==
- Global citizenship
- Transnationalism
- Pan-nationalism
- Plurinationalism
