= Electoral results for the district of Enfield =

South Australian district election results

This is a list of electoral results for the Electoral district of Enfield in South Australian state elections.

== Members for Enfield ==
First incarnation 1956–1970
Member	Party	Term
Jack Jennings	Labor	1956–1970
Second incarnation 2002–
Member	Party	Term
John Rau	Labor	2002–2018
Andrea Michaels	Labor	2019–2026
Lawrence Ben	Labor	2026-present

== Election results ==
=== Elections in the 2020s ===
==== 2026 ====
2026 South Australian state election: Enfield
Party	Candidate	Votes	%	±%
Labor	Lawrence Ben	10,792	45.8	−6.5
One Nation	Paul Morrell	4,344	18.5	+14.0
Liberal	Oscar Ong	3,503	14.9	−14.3
Greens	Chris Siclari	2,727	11.6	+1.6
Independent	Leila Clendon	1,172	5.0	+5.0
Family First	Daniel Solomon	575	2.4	−1.6
United Voice	Andrew Riglin	287	1.2	+1.2
Australian Family	Ariah Merrett	137	0.6	+0.6
Total formal votes		23,537	95.5	−1.2
Informal votes		1,105	4.5	+1.2
Turnout		24,642	87.7	−0.4
Two-candidate-preferred result
Labor	Lawrence Ben	16,184	68.8	+4.3
One Nation	Paul Morrell	7,353	31.2	+31.2
Labor hold				

==== 2022 ====
2022 South Australian state election: Enfield
Party	Candidate	Votes	%	±%
Labor	Andrea Michaels	12,145	52.3	+13.6
Liberal	Saru Rana	6,768	29.2	+1.3
Greens	Busby Cavanagh	2,310	10.0	+2.4
One Nation	Rajan Vaid	1,041	4.5	+4.5
Family First	Martin Petho	938	4.0	+4.0
Total formal votes		23,202	96.7	
Informal votes		793	3.3	
Turnout		23,995	88.1	
Two-party-preferred result
Labor	Andrea Michaels	14,972	64.5	+8.3
Liberal	Saru Rana	8,230	35.5	−8.3
Labor hold		Swing	+8.3	

Distribution of preferences: Enfield
Party	Candidate	Votes	Round 1		Round 2		Round 3	
Party	Candidate	Votes	Dist.	Total	Dist.	Total	Dist.	Total
Quota (50% + 1)		11,602						
Labor	Andrea Michaels	12,145	+328	12,473	+314	12,787	+2,185	14,972
Liberal	Saru Rana	6,768	+210	6,978	+573	7,551	+679	8,230
Greens	Busby Cavanagh	2,310	+200	2,510	+354	2,864	Excluded	
One Nation	Rajan Vaid	1,041	+200	1,241	Excluded			
Family First	Martin Petho	938	Excluded					

=== Elections in the 2010s ===
==== 2019 by-election ====
2019 Enfield state by-election
Party	Candidate	Votes	%	±%
Labor	Andrea Michaels	8,945	47.5	+6.6
Independent Putting People First	Gary Johanson	3,811	20.3	+20.3
Independent Liberal	Saru Rana	2,716	14.4	+14.4
Greens	Sebastian Konyn	1,562	8.3	−0.0
Liberal Democrats	Stephen Humble	868	4.6	+4.6
Independent Honest Approachable	Amrik Thandi	483	2.6	+2.6
Independent	Mansoor Hashimi	431	2.3	+2.3
Total formal votes		18,816	93.9	−1.6
Informal votes		1,228	6.1	+1.6
Turnout		20,044	77.5	−11.0
Two-candidate-preferred result
Labor	Andrea Michaels	11,585	61.6	+3.7
Independent	Gary Johanson	7,231	38.4	+38.4
Labor hold		Swing	N/A	

==== 2018 ====
2018 South Australian state election: Enfield
Party	Candidate	Votes	%	±%
Labor	John Rau	8,882	40.9	−5.1
Liberal	Deepa Mathew	5,761	26.6	−10.5
SA-Best	Carol Martin	4,004	18.5	+18.5
Greens	Cassie Alvey	1,802	8.3	−0.0
Conservatives	Steve Edmonds	718	3.3	−2.9
Dignity	Emma Cresdee	526	2.4	+2.1
Total formal votes		21,693	95.5	−0.7
Informal votes		1,017	4.5	+0.7
Turnout		22,710	88.6	+6.1
Two-party-preferred result
Labor	John Rau	12,554	57.9	+2.3
Liberal	Deepa Mathew	9,139	42.1	−2.3
Labor hold		Swing	+2.3	

2014 South Australian state election: Enfield
Party	Candidate	Votes	%	±%
Labor	John Rau	9,650	48.5	−2.4
Liberal	Scott Roberts	6,737	33.9	+1.0
Greens	Roger Levi	1,599	8.0	−0.2
Family First	Lisa Hood	1,300	6.5	+0.6
Independent	Andrew Stanko	591	3.0	+3.0
Total formal votes		19,877	96.0	+0.2
Informal votes		832	4.0	−0.2
Turnout		20,709	89.9	−1.4
Two-party-preferred result
Labor	John Rau	11,550	58.1	−0.9
Liberal	Scott Roberts	8,327	41.9	+0.9
Labor hold		Swing	−0.9	

2010 South Australian state election: Enfield
Party	Candidate	Votes	%	±%
Labor	John Rau	10,506	52.6	−10.8
Liberal	Luke Westley	6,222	31.1	+10.0
Greens	Robert Simms	1,601	8.0	+1.8
Family First	Brett Dewey	1,214	6.1	+0.4
Independent	Andrew Stanko	432	2.2	+2.2
Total formal votes		19,975	95.8	
Informal votes		876	4.2	
Turnout		20,851	91.3	
Two-party-preferred result
Labor	John Rau	12,094	60.5	−14.0
Liberal	Luke Westley	7,881	39.5	+14.0
Labor hold		Swing	−14.0	

=== Elections in the 2000s ===
2006 South Australian state election: Enfield
Party	Candidate	Votes	%	±%
Labor	John Rau	12,185	63.4	+23.5
Liberal	Sam Joyce	4,071	21.2	−3.3
Greens	Des Lawrence	1,190	6.2	+6.0
Family First	Martin Petho	1,094	5.7	+0.5
Democrats	Lucianne Baillie	673	3.5	−2.6
Total formal votes		19,213	96.2	
Informal votes		796	3.8	
Turnout		20,009	90.5	
Two-party-preferred result
Labor	John Rau	14,310	74.5	+8.9
Liberal	Sam Joyce	4,903	25.5	−8.9
Labor hold		Swing	+8.9	

2002 South Australian state election: Enfield
Party	Candidate	Votes	%	±%
Labor	John Rau	7,827	39.5	−16.5
Liberal	Doster Mitchell	4,779	24.1	−1.1
Independent	Ralph Clarke	4,575	23.1	+23.1
Democrats	Alex Angas	1,201	6.1	−9.8
Family First	Lorraine Evans	1,052	5.3	+5.3
One Nation	Barbara Kirvan	401	2.0	+2.0
Total formal votes		19,835	96.0	
Informal votes		831	4.0	
Turnout		20,666	92.4	
Two-party-preferred result
Labor	John Rau	13,063	65.9	−2.2
Liberal	Doster Mitchell	6,772	34.1	+2.2
Labor hold		Swing	−2.2	

=== Elections in the 1960s ===
1968 South Australian state election: Enfield
Party	Candidate	Votes	%	±%
Labor	Jack Jennings	28,246	67.2	+6.0
Liberal and Country	Allan Stock	13,036	31.0	+5.6
Social Credit	Edwin Meier	724	1.7	−6.5
Total formal votes		42,006	97.5	+1.0
Informal votes		1,090	2.5	−1.0
Turnout		43,096	94.7	−0.4
Two-party-preferred result
Labor	Jack Jennings	28,608	68.1	+1.1
Liberal and Country	Allan Stock	13,398	31.9	−1.1
Labor hold		Swing	+1.1	

1965 South Australian state election: Enfield
Party	Candidate	Votes	%	±%
Labor	Jack Jennings	21,951	61.2	−16.5
Liberal and Country	Allan Stock	9,125	25.4	+25.4
Social Credit	David Beavan	2,947	8.2	+8.2
Democratic Labor	Desmond Timlin	1,409	3.9	−18.4
Communist	Alan Miller	434	1.2	+1.2
Total formal votes		35,866	96.5	+0.7
Informal votes		1,301	3.5	−0.7
Turnout		37,167	95.1	+1.2
Two-party-preferred result
Labor	Jack Jennings	24,025	67.0	−10.7
Liberal and Country	Allan Stock	11,841	33.0	+33.0
Labor hold		Swing	N/A	

1962 South Australian state election: Enfield
Party	Candidate	Votes	%	±%
Labor	Jack Jennings	23,225	77.7	+9.4
Democratic Labor	Keith Cornell	6,671	22.3	+14.3
Total formal votes		29,896	95.8	0.0
Informal votes		1,324	4.2	0.0
Turnout		31,220	93.9	0.0
Labor hold		Swing	N/A	
