= Electoral results for the district of Port Adelaide =

South Australian district election results

This is a list of electoral results for the Electoral district of Port Adelaide in South Australian state elections.

== Members for Port Adelaide ==
Member	Party	Term
James Stephens	Labor Party	1938–1959
John Ryan	Labor Party	1959–1970
Kevin Foley	Labor Party	2002–2012
Susan Close	Labor Party	2012–2026

== Election results ==
=== Elections in the 2020s ===
==== 2026 ====
2026 South Australian state election: Port Adelaide
Party	Candidate	Votes	%	±%
Labor	Cheyne Rich	9,312	39.3	−19.1
One Nation	Joel Hendrie	5,080	21.4	+21.4
Independent	Claire Boan	3,097	13.1	+13.1
Greens	Hayden Shaw	2,425	10.2	+0.0
Liberal	Scott Anderson	1,724	7.3	−15.3
Legalise Cannabis	Sallyann Keen	511	2.1	+2.1
Independent	Gary Johanson	446	1.9	+1.9
Independent	Anne McMenamin	341	1.4	+1.4
Family First	Lucia Snelling	332	1.4	−3.6
Fair Go	Galina Brunoli	253	1.1	+1.1
Australian Family	Tom Day	135	0.6	+0.6
United Voice	Aaron Machado	44	0.2	+0.2
Total formal votes		23,700	92.8	−3.8
Informal votes		1,848	7.2	+3.8
Turnout		25,548	88.8	+0.7
Two-candidate-preferred result
Labor	Cheyne Rich	15,272	64.4	−7.4
One Nation	Joel Hendrie	8,428	35.6	+35.6
Labor hold		Swing	−7.4	

==== 2022 ====
2022 South Australian state election: Port Adelaide
Party	Candidate	Votes	%	±%
Labor	Susan Close	14,074	58.3	+10.4
Liberal	Chad McLaren	5,448	22.6	+4.0
Greens	Jim Moss	2,471	10.2	+4.4
Family First	Lucia Snelling	1,204	5.0	+5.0
Animal Justice	Adrian Romeo	945	3.9	+0.0
Total formal votes		24,142	96.6	
Informal votes		850	3.4	
Turnout		24,992	88.1	
Two-party-preferred result
Labor	Susan Close	17,335	71.8	+5.0
Liberal	Chad McLaren	6,807	28.2	−5.0
Labor hold		Swing	+5.0	

=== Elections in the 2010s ===
==== 2018 ====
2018 South Australian state election: Port Adelaide
Party	Candidate	Votes	%	±%
Labor	Susan Close	11,396	47.9	−3.1
Liberal	Chad McLaren	4,432	18.6	−9.2
SA-Best	Gary Johanson	4,419	18.6	+18.6
Greens	Danica Moors	1,400	5.9	−4.0
Animal Justice	Nicholas Hancock	930	3.9	+3.9
Dignity	Bryan Tingey	568	2.4	+2.4
Conservatives	Bruce Hambour	495	2.1	−3.7
Danig	Peter Matthews	163	0.7	+0.7
Total formal votes		23,803	94.2	−2.2
Informal votes		1,462	5.8	+2.2
Turnout		25,265	90.6	+5.1
Two-party-preferred result
Labor	Susan Close	15,895	66.8	+2.8
Liberal	Chad McLaren	7,908	33.2	−2.8
Two-candidate-preferred result
Labor	Susan Close	14,550	61.1	−2.9
SA-Best	Gary Johanson	9,253	38.9	+38.9
Labor hold				

2014 South Australian state election: Port Adelaide
Party	Candidate	Votes	%	±%
Labor	Susan Close	11,760	51.8	+2.0
Liberal	Brad Vermeer	7,330	32.3	+5.4
Greens	Mark Seater	1,815	8.0	+1.6
Family First	Bruce Hambour	1,783	7.9	+2.1
Total formal votes		22,688	96.6	+0.0
Informal votes		800	3.4	−0.0
Turnout		23,488	91.4	−1.8
Two-party-preferred result
Labor	Susan Close	13,745	60.6	−2.1
Liberal	Brad Vermeer	8,943	39.4	+2.1
Labor hold		Swing	−2.1	

Port Adelaide state by-election, 11 February 2012
Party	Candidate	Votes	%	±%
Labor	Susan Close	8,218	42.3	–7.6
Independent for You	Gary Johanson	4,717	24.3	+24.3
Independent True Blue Voice	Sue Lawrie	2,938	15.1	+15.1
Liberal Democrats	Stephen Humble	1,415	7.3	+7.3
Greens	Justin McArthur	1,096	5.6	–0.6
Independent Ban Live Animal Exports	Colin Thomas	314	1.6	+1.6
Independent Communist Australia	Bob Briton	292	1.5	+1.5
One Nation	Grant Carlin	269	1.4	+1.4
Democratic Labor	Elizabeth Pistor	151	0.8	+0.8
Total formal votes		19,410	92.8	–3.8
Informal votes		1,505	7.2	+3.8
Turnout		20,915	82.8	–10.4
Two-candidate-preferred result
Labor	Susan Close	10,277	52.9	–9.8
Independent for You	Gary Johanson	9,133	47.1	+47.1
Labor hold		Swing	N/A	

2010 South Australian state election: Port Adelaide
Party	Candidate	Votes	%	±%
Labor	Kevin Foley	10,854	49.9	−14.4
Liberal	Sue Lawrie	5,831	26.8	+8.6
Independent	Max James	2,398	11.0	+11.0
Greens	Marie Boland	1,368	6.3	+0.1
Family First	Bruce Hambour	1,281	5.9	−0.1
Total formal votes		21,732	95.9	
Informal votes		767	4.1	
Turnout		22,499	93.2	
Two-party-preferred result
Labor	Kevin Foley	13,643	62.8	−13.4
Liberal	Sue Lawrie	8,089	37.2	+13.4
Labor hold		Swing	−13.4	

=== Elections in the 2000s ===
2006 South Australian state election: Port Adelaide
Party	Candidate	Votes	%	±%
Labor	Kevin Foley	12,453	63.6	+5.2
Liberal	Anna Micheel	3,671	18.7	−3.9
Greens	Anne McMenamin	1,289	6.6	+2.4
Family First	James Troup	1,120	5.7	+5.7
Democrats	Amy Van Oosten	499	2.5	−3.6
One Nation	Darren Fairweather	310	1.6	−1.2
Independent	John McGill	250	1.3	+1.3
Total formal votes		19,592	95.0	−1.5
Informal votes		1,030	5.0	+1.5
Turnout		20,622	92.4	−1.3
Two-party-preferred result
Labor	Kevin Foley	14,823	75.7	+4.0
Liberal	Anna Micheel	4,769	24.3	−4.0
Labor hold		Swing	+4.0	

2002 South Australian state election: Port Adelaide
Party	Candidate	Votes	%	±%
Labor	Kevin Foley	11,796	58.4	−4.5
Liberal	Robert Crew	4,571	22.6	+1.7
Democrats	Meryl McDougall	1,239	6.1	−9.1
SA First	Joe Carbone	1,171	5.8	+5.8
Greens	Andrew Nance	843	4.2	+4.2
One Nation	Jan Amos	564	2.8	+2.8
Total formal votes		20,184	96.5	
Informal votes		730	3.5	
Turnout		20,914	93.7	
Two-party-preferred result
Labor	Kevin Foley	14,466	71.7	−1.1
Liberal	Robert Crew	5,718	28.3	+1.1
Labor hold		Swing	−1.1	

=== Elections in the 1960s ===
1968 South Australian state election: Port Adelaide
Party	Candidate	Votes	%	±%
Labor	John Ryan	15,460	68.4	−8.4
Liberal and Country	Graeme Sargent	4,811	23.6	+23.6
Social Credit	Denis McEvoy	1,246	6.1	+6.1
Communist	Peter Symon	380	1.9	−2.6
Total formal votes		20,348	96.5	+2.2
Informal votes		740	3.5	−2.2
Turnout		21,088	93.5	−1.2
Two-party-preferred result
Labor	John Ryan	14,876	73.1	−0.9
Liberal and Country	Graeme Sargent	5,472	26.9	+0.9
Labor hold		Swing	−0.9	

1965 South Australian state election: Port Adelaide
Party	Candidate	Votes	%	±%
Labor	John Ryan	15,460	76.8	−6.5
Democratic Labor	Donald Boys	3,768	18.7	+5.6
Communist	Peter Symon	904	4.5	+0.9
Total formal votes		20,132	94.3	−1.7
Informal votes		1,216	5.7	+1.7
Turnout		21,348	94.7	+1.1
Two-candidate-preferred result
Labor	John Ryan	16,228	80.6	−5.7
Democratic Labor	Donald Boys	3,904	19.4	+5.7
Labor hold		Swing	−5.7	

1962 South Australian state election: Port Adelaide
Party	Candidate	Votes	%	±%
Labor	John Ryan	17,834	83.3	+3.1
Democratic Labor	George Basivovs	2,811	13.1	−0.4
Communist	James Moss	770	3.6	−2.8
Total formal votes		21,415	96.0	+1.2
Informal votes		885	4.0	−1.2
Turnout		22,300	93.6	−0.6
Two-candidate-preferred result
Labor	John Ryan	18,412	86.0	+1.1
Democratic Labor	George Basivovs	3,003	14.0	−1.1
Labor hold		Swing	+1.1	
