= Lobbying in South Australia =

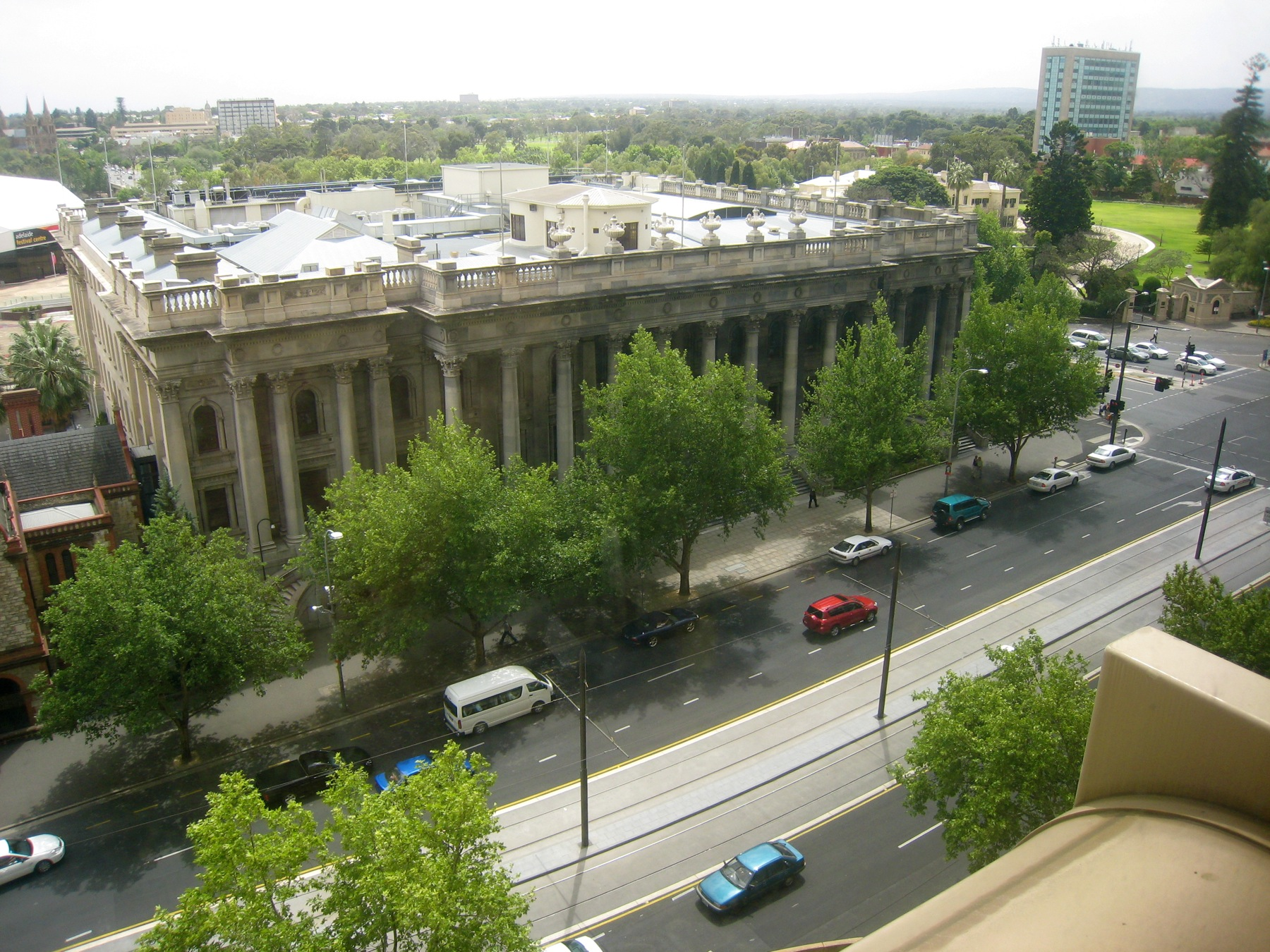
Parliament House, Adelaide

Various individuals and organisations undertake political lobbying on a variety of issues in the state of South Australia.

== Description ==
Political lobbying is an activity by which organisations or individuals attempt to influence the Government of South Australia in its policy, regulation, and law-making. Since 1 December 2009, lobbyists commercially operating on behalf of third party interests are required to join a register and must also comply with a Code of Conduct. The register was available to the public via the website of the Department of the Premier and Cabinet, but from 1 July 2024 moved to the Attorney-General's Department. The list includes the names of registered entities, their employed lobbyists, and their clients.

== Funding of lobby groups ==
New state laws, the Electoral (Accountability and Integrity) Amendment Act 2024, which came into operation on 1 July 2025, have banned political donations, instead funding parties and candidates with taxpayer funds. The effect of the changes mean that minor parties and independents will be at a disadvantage, while incumbent parties will be well funded to run their campaigns with public money, although the legislation includes provisions such as advance payments to new entrants, who will be entitled to receive donations of up to $5,000 and will also be subject to a spending cap. According to The Australia Institute, around 75 per cent of public funding will go to the major parties, and only 1-2 per cent to new entrants. South Australia's changes have gone further than any other state, and possibly any other country, with this legislation.

== Resources and energy sector lobbyists ==
During the Rann government and later the Weatherill government (post 2011), significant efforts were made to encourage mineral and energy resource development in South Australia. Government initiatives were welcomed by the private sector, many of which engaged third party lobbyists to further their objectives. Some lobbyists represent these sectors as part of a broader portfolio of interests (Bespoke Approach, for example) while others such as Barker Wentworth are more specialised. Crosby Textor is another high profile international lobbying firm active in this area in SA.

=== Marathon Resources compensation claim ===
Exploration company Marathon Resources successfully lobbied the South Australian government for compensation after a ban on mining was introduced in the Arkaroola Protection Area, where the company had previously been exploring for uranium. In 2011, the company had three former Labor ministers, a former state Liberal MP and a former federal Liberal minister lobbying for the company or sitting on its board. The company's lobbyists included ALP lobbyist John Quirke, former Liberal MP Graham Gunn, and the firm Bespoke Approach (which is composed of Nick Bolkus, Alexander Downer and Ian Smith). Chris Schacht was sitting on the company's board during the compensation drive. In 2012, the company was paid $5 million in compensation by the Government of South Australia.

== Unofficial lobby groups ==
Turning Point Australia (TPAUS), which was founded by Joel Jammal in 2023, has established a branch in Adelaide led by George Mamalis, specifically in order to try to influence the outcome of the 2026 South Australian state election in March 2026 by lobbying for minor right-wing parties at the election. TPAUS is a branded offshoot of Turning Point USA, founded by Charlie Kirk. Its stated mission is "to organise grassroots activism campaigns that educate, train, and assist citizens in fighting for freedom in Australia", with Jammal describing the group as "ambassadors for freedom, free speech, family values, and business". Mamalis previously worked for former state Liberal leader David Speirs, for Sarah Game when she was with One Nation SA, and later for Liberal senator Alex Antic. He founded The Adelaide Set, "a grassroots media platform" which espoused vaccine skepticism during the COVID-19 pandemic, and since then has been dominated by right-wing issues such as "mass migration", net zero, trans issues, and the protection of "western culture". Mamalis regularly shares posts featuring South Australian anti-abortion campaigner Joanna Howe, Sarah Game, Pauline Hanson, and Adelaide City Councillor Henry Davis, who is running for Sarah Game's new party, Fair Go for Australians. As of February 2026 the group is not registered on the Lobbyist Register. TPAUS aims to establish chapters across Australia, including in high schools and universities, with Jammal wanting politicians to see the organisation as "the biggest threat in keeping voters informed". The group expects to spend over A$10,000 on their campaign, which will see them hosting events on university campuses, among other events.

== People ==
=== Senior public servants turned lobbyists ===
Some lobbyists active in South Australia are former senior public servants. Former CEO of the Department of Planning, Transport and Infrastructure Rod Hook, as of 2018 lobbying as Rod Hook & Associates is an example of this.

=== Former politicians turned lobbyists ===
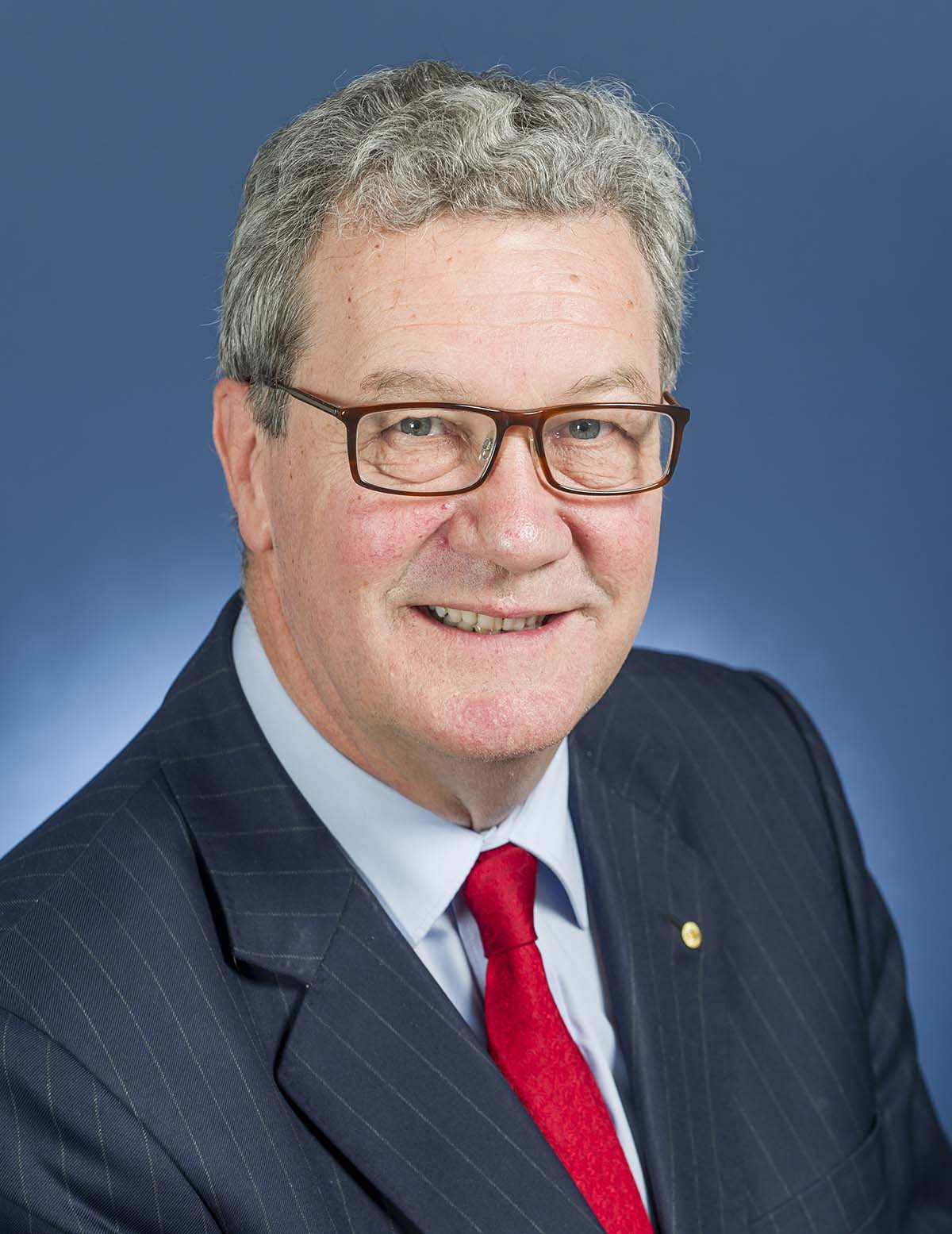
Alexander Downer

Many consultant lobbyists in South Australia are former state or federal politicians. As of April 2015 they included (listed with former party affiliations):

Name	Former party affiliation	Political retirement	Lobbying as
Baldwin, Bob	Liberal	2016	Outcomes & Strategies Group
Bolkus, Nick	Labor	2003	Nick Bolkus, Kazaru, Bespoke Approach
Conlon, Patrick	Labor	2014	Patrick Conlon, Conlon Farrell Consulting, Conlon Advisory
Crafter, Greg	Labor	1993	Greg Crafter Consulting
Downer, Alexander	Liberal	2008	Bespoke Approach
Duluk, Sam	Liberal	2022	Capetal Advisory
Elferink, John	Country Liberal	2016	John Elferink
Evans, Iain	Liberal	2014	Iain Evans Consulting
Everingham, Paul	Country Liberal	1987	GRA Everingham
Foley, Kevin	Labor	2011	Foley Advisory, Bespoke Approach
Gunn, Graham	Liberal	2010	Graham Gunn, The Colt Consulting Trust
Henderson, Paul	Labor	2013	Bespoke Territory (affiliated with Bespoke Approach)
Ingerson, Graham	Liberal	2001	Expedite SA, Visionary and Enterprising Management Services, GA & JA Ingerson,
Jeanes, Susan	Liberal		Right Angle Business Services
Lewis, Peter	Independent, previously Liberal	2006	Essential Media Communications
Matthew, Wayne	Liberal	2006	Government Relations Solutions, Govstrat
Olsen, John	Liberal	2001	Bespoke Approach
Portolesi, Grace	Labor	2014	Grace Portolesi Connect
Pyne, Christopher	Liberal	2019	Pyne & Partners, GC Advisory (co-owned by Adam Howard)
Quirke, John	Labor	2000	Pallidon, The Colt Consulting Trust
Reith, Peter	Liberal	2001	Peter Reith
Snelling, Jack	Labor		Snelling Consulting
Santoro, Santo	Liberal	2007	Santo Santoro Consulting
Schacht, Chris	Labor	2002	Chris Schacht
Wright, Michael	Labor	2014	Michael Wright
