= Electoral results for the district of Cheltenham =

South Australian district election results

This is a list of electoral results for the Electoral district of Cheltenham in South Australian state elections.

== Members for Cheltenham ==
Member	Party	Term
Jay Weatherill	Labor	2002–2018
Joe Szakacs	Labor	2019–present

== Election results ==
=== Elections in the 2020s ===
==== 2026 ====
2026 South Australian state election: Cheltenham
Party	Candidate	Votes	%	±%
Labor	Joe Szakacs	11,434	47.8	−7.8
One Nation	Melissa Higgins	5,045	21.1	+21.1
Greens	Steffi Medrow	3,159	13.2	+2.3
Liberal	Helen Pike	2,195	9.2	−15.2
Independent	Kosta Hadjimarkou	809	3.4	+3.4
Family First	Alex Tennikoff	569	2.4	−4.1
Fair Go	Karoline Brown	418	1.7	+1.7
Australian Family	John Martin	281	1.2	+1.2
Total formal votes		23,910	95.2	−1.2
Informal votes		1,216	4.8	+1.2
Turnout		25,126	87.7	−0.4
Two-candidate-preferred result
Labor	Joe Szakacs	16,028	67.0	−2.1
One Nation	Melissa Higgins	7,882	33.0	+33.0
Labor hold				

==== 2022 ====
2022 South Australian state election: Cheltenham
Party	Candidate	Votes	%	±%
Labor	Joe Szakacs	13,027	55.6	+2.4
Liberal	Shane Rix	5,730	24.4	+2.7
Greens	Steffi Medrow	2,545	10.9	+4.6
Family First	Alex Tennikoff	1,513	6.5	+6.5
Independent	Mike Lesiw	633	2.7	+2.7
Total formal votes		23,448	96.4	
Informal votes		888	3.6	
Turnout		24,336	88.1	
Two-party-preferred result
Labor	Joe Szakacs	16,194	69.1	+2.4
Liberal	Shane Rix	7,254	30.9	−2.4
Labor hold		Swing	+2.4	

Distribution of preferences: Cheltenham
Party	Candidate	Votes	Round 1		Round 2		Round 3	
Party	Candidate	Votes	Dist.	Total	Dist.	Total	Dist.	Total
Quota (50% + 1)		11,725						
Labor	Joe Szakacs	13,027	+112	13,139	+450	13,589	+2,605	16,194
Liberal	Shane Rix	5,730	+68	5,798	+849	6,647	+607	7,254
Greens	Steffi Medrow	2,545	+160	2,705	+507	3,212	Excluded	
Family First	Alex Tennikoff	1,513	+293	1,806	Excluded			
Independent	Mike Lesiw	633	Excluded					

=== Elections in the 2010s ===
==== 2019 by-election ====
2019 Cheltenham state by-election
Party	Candidate	Votes	%	±%
Labor	Joe Szakacs	11,290	58.6	+6.2
Liberal Democrats	Peter Miller	3,612	18.7	+18.7
Greens	Steffi Medrow	2,818	14.6	+8.3
Independent Adelaide Olympics 2032	Rob de Jonge	877	4.5	+4.5
Independent The Other Guy	Mike Lesiw	679	3.5	+3.5
Total formal votes		19,276	93.5	−1.4
Informal votes		1,338	6.5	+1.4
Turnout		20,614	78.1	−12.0
Two-candidate-preferred result
Labor	Joe Szakacs	14,365	74.5	+8.7
Liberal Democrats	Peter Miller	4,911	25.5	+25.5
Labor hold		Swing	N/A	

==== 2018 ====
2018 South Australian state election: Cheltenham
Party	Candidate	Votes	%	±%
Labor	Jay Weatherill	11,661	52.4	−2.9
Liberal	Penny Pratt	4,954	22.3	−7.2
SA-Best	John Noonan	3,369	15.1	+15.1
Greens	Steffi Medrow	1,403	6.3	−2.5
Dignity	Madeline McCaul	537	2.4	+2.4
Independent	Vincent Scali	337	1.5	+1.5
Total formal votes		22,261	94.9	−1.7
Informal votes		1,195	5.1	+1.7
Turnout		23,456	90.0	+5.0
Two-party-preferred result
Labor	Jay Weatherill	14,662	65.9	+1.5
Liberal	Penny Pratt	7,599	34.1	−1.5
Labor hold		Swing	+1.5	

2014 South Australian state election: Cheltenham
Party	Candidate	Votes	%	±%
Labor	Jay Weatherill	12,060	55.4	−0.6
Liberal	Jack Batty	6,414	29.5	+5.1
Greens	Rebecca Galdies	1,831	8.4	+2.2
Family First	Alex Tennikoff	1,470	6.8	+1.3
Total formal votes		21,775	96.5	+0.8
Informal votes		786	3.5	−0.8
Turnout		22,561	91.3	−1.5
Two-party-preferred result
Labor	Jay Weatherill	13,993	64.3	−1.8
Liberal	Jack Batty	7,782	35.7	+1.8
Labor hold		Swing	−1.8	

2010 South Australian state election: Cheltenham
Party	Candidate	Votes	%	±%
Labor	Jay Weatherill	11,326	56.2	−6.9
Liberal	James Bourke	4,912	24.4	+7.2
Independent	Henrietta Child	1,551	7.7	+7.7
Greens	Paul Downton	1,280	6.3	+0.5
Family First	Walter Shigrov	1,091	5.4	−4.1
Total formal votes		20,160	95.4	
Informal votes		908	4.6	
Turnout		21,068	92.8	
Two-party-preferred result
Labor	Jay Weatherill	13,327	66.1	−9.4
Liberal	James Bourke	6,833	33.9	+9.4
Labor hold		Swing	−9.4	

=== Elections in the 2000s ===
2006 South Australian state election: Cheltenham
Party	Candidate	Votes	%	±%
Labor	Jay Weatherill	12,020	62.7	+14.1
Liberal	Sue Lawrie	3,259	17.0	−6.8
Family First	Greg Perry	1,895	9.9	+9.9
Greens	Margaret Davies	1,140	6.0	+3.0
Democrats	Pam Moore	842	4.4	−2.4
Total formal votes		19,156	95.7	+1.6
Informal votes		866	4.3	−1.6
Turnout		20,022	91.4	−1.6
Two-party-preferred result
Labor	Jay Weatherill	14,444	75.4	+8.7
Liberal	Sue Lawrie	4,712	24.6	−8.7
Labor hold		Swing	+8.7	

2002 South Australian state election: Cheltenham
Party	Candidate	Votes	%	±%
Labor	Jay Weatherill	9,457	48.6	−6.4
Liberal	Sue Lawrie	4,627	23.8	−1.2
Independent	Murray De Laine	1,886	9.7	+9.7
Democrats	Cheryl Glenie	1,329	6.8	−9.0
SA First	Alex Alexander	847	4.3	+4.3
Greens	Anne McMenamin	588	3.0	+3.0
One Nation	Sarah Gibson	391	2.0	+2.0
Independent	Nugget Cooke	348	1.8	+1.8
Total formal votes		19,473	94.1	
Informal votes		1,213	5.9	
Turnout		20,686	93.0	
Two-party-preferred result
Labor	Jay Weatherill	12,986	66.7	+0.1
Liberal	Sue Lawrie	6,487	33.3	−0.1
Labor hold		Swing	+0.1	
