= Andrew Butcher =

Australian businessperson and spokesperson

Andrew Butcher is an Australian businessman, former spokesperson for Rupert Murdoch, and partner in corporate advisory firm and political lobbyist, Bespoke Approach.

== Career ==
Butcher's career in the media began with a job as a copyboy at the Melbourne Sun, from which he later emerged a journalist. Butcher worked from Tokyo as a North Asia correspondent, from New York as a business correspondent for The Times, and from Canberra as chief political reporter for the Herald Sun. He was the executive director of communications and media relations at Telstra, prior to establishing his own businesses, Butcher & Co, and later Bespoke Approach. In the latter venture, Butcher has worked closely with former Australian politicians Nick Bolkus, Alexander Downer, and Kevin Foley as a corporate advisor.

Butcher became Rupert Murdoch's longterm primary spokesperson after he accepted a position as senior vice president of corporate affairs at News Corporation in New York City. As of 2014 Butcher continued to provide occasional comment to the media on the affairs of Rupert Murdoch and News Corporation.

In March 2014, The Australian revealed that Butcher was being paid $600 an hour by the ABC to repair its damaged relationship with the Abbott government and stem criticism from News Corporation, which attracted further commentary from opinion-writer Andrew Bolt.

== Other activities ==
Butcher and his wife have undertaken philanthropic ventures.

Butcher's drives a BMW M3, complete with Genetic Epilepsy signage, winning races at Bathurst and on the Phillip Island Grand Prix Circuit, while raising funds and awareness to help find new treatments and a cure genetic epilepsy.

== Personal life ==
Butcher is from Muckleford, near Castlemaine in country Victoria. His partner is American journalist Sara James, and the couple have two children. On his friendship with Rupert Murdoch, Butcher told Australian Story in 2013 that he "got along famously with Rupert. I was lucky enough to not be in awe of him. I found him to be very Australian". Butcher is a lifelong member of the Muckleford Cricket Club.
