= 2019 Enfield state by-election =

- 9 February 2019

Electoral district of Enfield in the South Australian House of Assembly
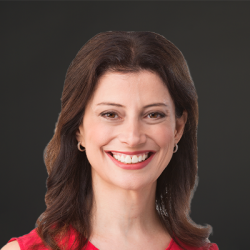

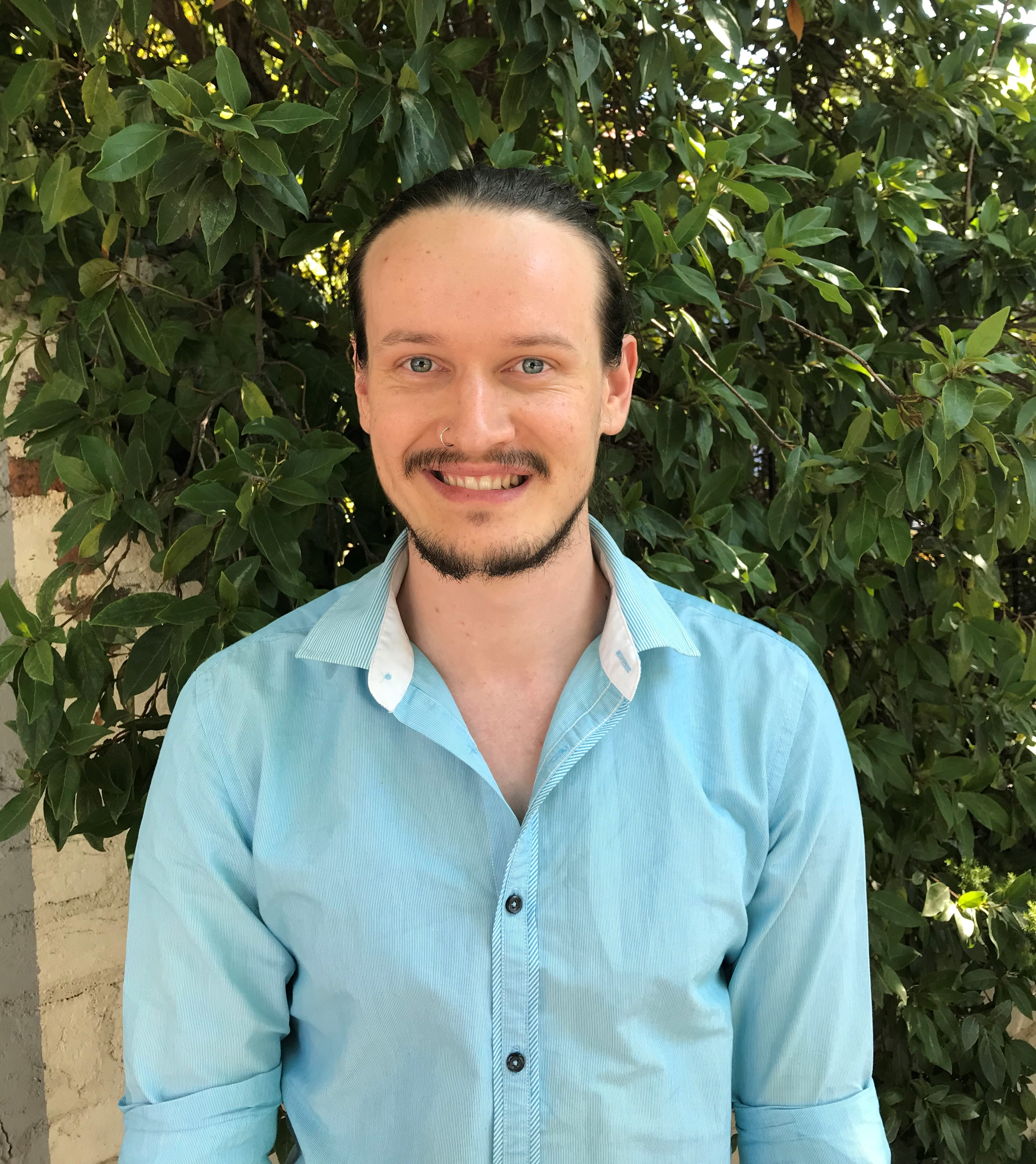
	First party	Second party
		IND
Candidate	Andrea Michaels	Gary Johanson
Party	Labor	Independent
Primary vote	8,945	3,811
Percentage	47.5%	20.3%
Swing	▲6.6	▲20.3
TCP	61.6%	38.4%
TCP swing	▲3.7	▲38.4
	Third party	Fourth party
	IND
Candidate	Saru Rana	Sebastian Konyn
Party	Ind. Liberal	Greens
Primary vote	2,716	1,562
Percentage	14.4%	8.3%
Swing	▲14.4	▼0.0
MP before election
John Rau
Labor
Elected MP
Andrea Michaels
Labor

A by-election for the seat of Enfield in the South Australian House of Assembly was held on 9 February 2019. The by-election was triggered by the parliamentary resignation of Labor Party MP and former deputy premier John Rau on 17 December 2018. Labor candidate Andrea Michaels retained the seat with an increased margin.

A Cheltenham by-election was held on the same day, as Rau's former leader and Premier, Jay Weatherill, had also resigned from parliament.

== Dates ==
Date	Event
Friday 11 January 2019	Writ of election issued by the Governor
Monday 21 January 2019	Close of electoral rolls (12 noon)
Thursday 24 January 2019	Close of nominations (12 noon)
Tuesday 29 January 2019	Start of early voting
Saturday 9 February 2019	Polling day (8am to 6pm)
Saturday 16 February 2019	Last day for receipt of postal votes
Friday 22 February 2019	Last day for return of writs

== Candidates ==
Candidates (7) in ballot paper order
Independent Putting People First	Gary Johanson	Former Liberal Party and SA Best member, perennial candidate. Former Mayor of Port Adelaide Enfield.
Independent Honest Approachable	Amrik Singh Thandi	Ran as the lead candidate on an upper house independent ticket at the previous state election receiving 0.3 percent.
Australian Labor Party	Andrea Michaels	Financial lawyer.
Independent Liberal	Saru Rana	Liberal Party member, ran as a "Liberal Independent" with party consent. Anti-domestic violence campaigner and Indian Sun local editor.
Independent	Mansoor Hashimi	
Liberal Democrats	Stephen Humble	Perennial candidate
Greens	Sebastian Konyn	Horticulture student with an honours degree in gender studies and social analysis

The Liberal Party declined to field a candidate for both the Enfield and Cheltenham by-elections.

== Result ==
Enfield state by-election, 9 February 2019
Party	Candidate	Votes	%	±%
Labor	Andrea Michaels	8,945	47.5	+6.6
Independent Putting People First	Gary Johanson	3,811	20.3	+20.3
Independent Liberal	Saru Rana	2,716	14.4	+14.4
Greens	Sebastian Konyn	1,562	8.3	−0.0
Liberal Democrats	Stephen Humble	868	4.6	+4.6
Independent Honest Approachable	Amrik Thandi	483	2.6	+2.6
Independent	Mansoor Hashimi	431	2.3	+2.3
Total formal votes		18,816	93.9	−1.6
Informal votes		1,228	6.1	+1.6
Turnout		20,044	77.5	−11.0
Two-candidate-preferred result
Labor	Andrea Michaels	11,585	61.6	+3.7
Independent	Gary Johanson	7,231	38.4	+38.4
Labor hold				

== See also ==
- 2019 Cheltenham state by-election
- List of South Australian House of Assembly by-elections
