= 2019 Cheltenham state by-election =

- 9 February 2019

Electoral district of Cheltenham in the South Australian House of Assembly
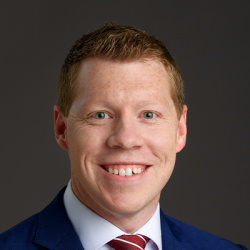

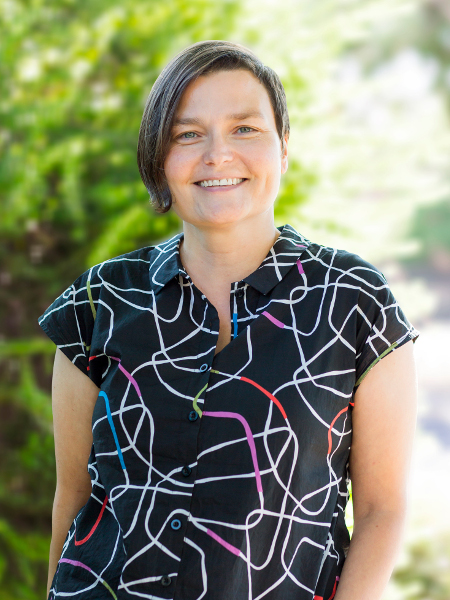
	First party	Second party	Third party
		LDP
Candidate	Joe Szakacs	Peter Miller	Steffi Medrow
Party	Labor	Liberal Democrats	Greens
Primary vote	11,290	3,612	2,818
Percentage	58.6%	18.7%	14.6%
Swing	▲6.2	▲18.7	▲8.3
TCP	74.5%	25.5%
TCP swing	▲8.7	▲25.5
MP before election
Jay Weatherill
Labor
Elected MP
Joe Szakacs
Labor

A by-election for the seat of Cheltenham in the South Australian House of Assembly was held on 9 February 2019. The by-election was triggered by the parliamentary resignation of Labor Party MP and former premier Jay Weatherill on 17 December 2018. Labor candidate Joe Szakacs retained the seat with an increased margin.

An Enfield by-election was held on the same day, as Weatherill's former deputy leader and deputy premier, John Rau, had also resigned from parliament.

== Dates ==
Date	Event
Friday 11 January 2019	Writ of election issued by the governor
Monday 21 January 2019	Close of electoral rolls (12 noon)
Thursday 24 January 2019	Close of nominations (12 noon)
Tuesday 29 January 2019	Start of early voting
Saturday 9 February 2019	Polling day (8am to 6pm)
Saturday 16 February 2019	Last day for receipt of postal votes
Friday 22 February 2019	Last day for return of writs

== Candidates ==
Candidates (5) in ballot paper order
Liberal Democrats	Peter Miller	
Independent The Other Guy	Mike Lesiw	Contested Croydon at the previous state election.
Australian Labor Party	Joe Szakacs	SA Unions secretary, lawyer, professional swimmer.
Greens	Steffi Medrow	Previous candidate.
Independent Adelaide Olympics 2032	Rob de Jonge	Real estate agent, former Onkaparinga councillor. Perennial candidate, has previously sought Liberal Party preselection.

The Liberal Party declined to field a candidate for both the Cheltenham and Enfield by-elections.

== Result ==
Cheltenham state by-election, 9 February 2019
Party	Candidate	Votes	%	±%
Labor	Joe Szakacs	11,290	58.6	+6.2
Liberal Democrats	Peter Miller	3,612	18.7	+18.7
Greens	Steffi Medrow	2,818	14.6	+8.3
Independent Adelaide Olympics 2032	Rob de Jonge	877	4.5	+4.5
Independent The Other Guy	Mike Lesiw	679	3.5	+3.5
Total formal votes		19,276	93.5	−1.4
Informal votes		1,338	6.5	+1.4
Turnout		20,614	78.1	−12.0
Two-candidate-preferred result
Labor	Joe Szakacs	14,365	74.5	+8.7
Liberal Democrats	Peter Miller	4,911	25.5	+25.5
Labor hold				

== See also ==
- 2019 Enfield state by-election
- List of South Australian House of Assembly by-elections
