= 2012 Port Adelaide state by-election =

Port Adelaide, outlined in yellow, is a north-western metropolitan seat in Adelaide, South Australia.

A by-election occurred in the South Australian House of Assembly seat of Port Adelaide on 11 February 2012. Labor's Susan Close won the seat on a 52.9 percent two-candidate-preferred (TCP) vote. The by-election was triggered by the resignation of former Deputy Premier, Treasurer and state Labor MHA Kevin Foley.

== Background ==
Foley and Mike Rann resigned from their parliamentary seats, which created twin by-elections for 11 February, the other being the 2012 Ramsay by-election. On two-party-preferred vote (TPP) margins of 12.8 and 18.0 points from the 2010 election, considered safe margins on the current pendulum, Labor would have likely retained both seats on the TPP vote based on unchanged statewide Newspoll since the previous election. In the lower house, 24 seats form a majority, the Labor government held 26 of 47 seats. If one or both seats had been lost, Labor would still have retained majority government.

Foley was first elected as the member for the new north-western metropolitan seat of Hart at the 1993 election. Hart was mostly replaced with a recreated Port Adelaide ahead of the 2002 election, and Foley followed most of his constituents into the new seat. From Rann Labor's election to government in 2002 until 2011, Foley became the longest-serving Deputy Premier of South Australia and the third-longest-serving Treasurer of South Australia.

The last by-election was the 2009 Frome by-election, when another former Premier, Rob Kerin, retired from politics. The seat was narrowly won by an independent candidate.

== Timeline ==
Date	Event
12 December 2011	Kevin Foley resigned from the Parliament of South Australia.
4 January 2012	Writs were issued by the Speaker of the House of Assembly to proceed with a by-election.
16 January 2012	Enrolment on electoral rolls closed, with a total of 25,248 voters enrolled for the by-election.
19 January 2012	Candidate nominations closed and ballot order draw occurred, in line with s60(a) of the Electoral Act 1985.
11 February 2012	Polling day occurred between the hours of 8am and 6pm.
27 February 2012	Writ returned before this date for formal result declaration.

== Candidates ==
9 candidates in ballot paper order
Independent True Blue Voice	Sue Lawrie	Liberal Party member, contested seat at previous election as the official Liberal Party candidate.
Independent Ban Live Animal Exports	Colin Thomas	Contested the federal Port Adelaide seat for the Greens in 2007 and the neighbouring state seat in 2010 as an independent.
Independent Communist Australia	Bob Briton	Endorsed candidate of the unregistered Communist Party, who contested the neighbouring seat at previous election.
Democratic Labor	Elizabeth Pistor	No information available.
One Nation	Grant Carlin	Runs a horticultural business.
Labor	Susan Close	Former Department for Environment and Natural Resources executive.
SA Greens	Justin McArthur	Student, environment officer and union board director at Adelaide University, and a radio producer.
Independent for You	Gary Johanson	Former Liberal Party member, and Mayor of Port Adelaide Enfield.
Liberal Democrats	Stephen Humble	Studied electronic engineering at TAFE, communications engineer for a large corporation.

A record nine candidates nominated for the seat of Port Adelaide. The Liberal Party, Family First Party, and independent candidate Max James, who contested the previous election and gained a primary vote of 26.8 percent, 5.9 percent, and 11.0 percent respectively, did not contest the by-election.

== Polling ==
Three opinion polls were conducted and released by the in-house polling group at The Advertiser, Adelaide's main newspaper:

- On 21 September 2011, 642 voters were polled in the seat. Before either major party decided on a candidate, Labor's primary vote was at 37 percent (49.9 percent at the last election), the Liberals on 31 percent (26.8 percent), Johanson on 14 percent, the Greens on 11 percent (6.3 percent), and other independents with 6 percent.
- On 18 January 2012, 475 voters were polled in the seat. Since the September 2011 poll, there had been a change of Premier, Labor preselected Close, Foley formally resigned from parliament, and the Liberal Party declined to field a candidate. Labor's primary vote was at 48 percent, Johanson on 23 percent, the LDP on 14 percent, Lawrie on 9 percent, the Greens on 3 percent, with remaining candidates on about 3 percent collectively.
- On 1 February 2012, 402 voters were polled in the seat, with Labor on 44 percent, Lawrie on 18 percent, Johanson on 14 percent, the Greens on 12 percent, and remaining candidates including the LDP on about 12 percent collectively.

Under instant runoff voting with voters' full preference allocation, on the above polling and without a Liberal candidate, it was possible for one of several candidates to win. On how-to-vote cards located on all polling booths at each polling place, Briton recommended preferences to the Greens and then Labor, the Greens recommended preferences to Labor, Thomas had a split ticket recommending Labor or Johanson, while the remaining party and independent candidates including Johanson generally recommended preferences between each other in varying order. The by-election was expected to be a close contest on both eliminated candidate preference flows and the final TCP vote.

== Result ==
Port Adelaide state by-election, 11 February 2012
Party	Candidate	Votes	%	±%
Labor	Susan Close	8,218	42.3	–7.6
Independent for You	Gary Johanson	4,717	24.3	+24.3
Independent True Blue Voice	Sue Lawrie	2,938	15.1	+15.1
Liberal Democrats	Stephen Humble	1,415	7.3	+7.3
Greens	Justin McArthur	1,096	5.6	–0.6
Independent Ban Live Animal Exports	Colin Thomas	314	1.6	+1.6
Independent Communist Australia	Bob Briton	292	1.5	+1.5
One Nation	Grant Carlin	269	1.4	+1.4
Democratic Labor	Elizabeth Pistor	151	0.8	+0.8
Total formal votes		19,410	92.8	–3.8
Informal votes		1,505	7.2	+3.8
Turnout		20,915	82.8	–10.4
Two-candidate-preferred result
Labor	Susan Close	10,277	52.9	–9.8
Independent for You	Gary Johanson	9,133	47.1	+47.1
Labor hold		Swing	N/A	

Labor retained the seat on a 52.9 percent TCP vote against Johanson, with a majority in seven of 11 polling places. Postal votes were included on 13 February, absentee and pre-poll votes were included on 14 February. Preference distributions occurred on 18 February. Results are final.

Neither a TPP or TCP swing could be produced, as the 2010 result was between Labor and Liberal rather than Labor and independent with no Liberal candidate. An increase or decrease in margins in these situations cannot be meaningfully interpreted as swings. As explained by the Australian Broadcasting Corporation's Antony Green, when a major party does not contest a by-election, preferences from independents or minor parties that would normally flow to both major parties does not take place, causing asymmetric preference flows. Examples of this are the 2008 Mayo and 2002 Cunningham federal by-elections, with seats returning to TPP form at the next election. This contradicted News Ltd claims of large swings and a potential Liberal Party win in Port Adelaide at the next election. At the 2014 election, Port Adelaide was Labor's 7th safest seat on a margin of over 10 percent. Johanson unsuccessfully contested the neighbouring seat of Lee at the 2014 election with a primary vote of 11.2 percent.

== See also ==
- List of South Australian House of Assembly by-elections
