= Cheyne Rich =

Australian politician

Cheyne Rich MP

Member of the South Australian House of Assembly for Port Adelaide
- Incumbent
- Assumed office 21 March 2026
- Preceded by: Susan Close

Personal details
- Party: Labor
- Spouse: Ann-Marie
- Children: 2
- Education: Flinders University

Cheyne Christopher Rich is an Australian Labor politician who has served as a member of the South Australian House of Assembly representing Port Adelaide since the 2026 South Australian state election.

Prior to his election to parliament, Rich served as deputy chief of staff to Premier Peter Malinauskas from 2022 to 2025. He worked under Malinauskas in opposition as caucus liaison and director of campaigns from 2018 to 2022, and previously worked as a political organiser for Left faction-affiliated trade union United Voice from 2010 to 2018. Rich also served as local campaign manager for his immediate predecessor in Port Adelaide, Susan Close and worked in the offices of Labor MPs Tony Piccolo and Grace Portolesi.

South Australian House of Assembly
Preceded by Susan Close	Member for Port Adelaide; 2026–present	Incumbent
