= Andrea Michaels =

Former Australian politician

The Honourable Andrea Michaels
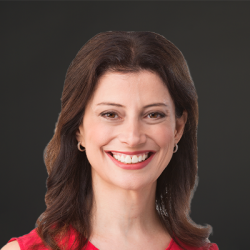
- Michaels in 2022

Minister for Small and Family Business
- In office 24 March 2022 – 26 March 2026
- Premier: Peter Malinauskas
- Preceded by: New position
- Succeeded by: Nadia Clancy

Minister for Consumer and Business Affairs
- In office 24 March 2022 – 26 March 2026
- Premier: Peter Malinauskas
- Preceded by: New position
- Succeeded by: Michael Brown

Minister for Arts
- In office 24 March 2022 – 26 March 2026
- Premier: Peter Malinauskas
- Preceded by: New position
- Succeeded by: Kyam Maher

Member of the South Australian House of Assembly for Enfield
- In office 9 February 2019 – 20 March 2026
- Preceded by: John Rau
- Succeeded by: Lawrence Ben

Personal details
- Born: Andrea Michaels; 1975 (age 50–51) London, England
- Party: Labor
- Children: 2
- Education: Flinders University
- Profession: Taxation lawyer
- Andrea Michaels' voice Andrea Michaels speaking at South Australia's Industry Climate Change Conference; Recorded 9 May 2025

Andrea Michaels (born 1975) is a former Australian politician representing the South Australian House of Assembly seat of Enfield for the South Australian Branch of the Australian Labor Party since the 2019 Enfield by-election. She served as Minister for Small and Family Business, Minister for Consumer and Business Affairs and Minister for Arts in the First Malinauskas ministry between 2022 and 2026. She is an Associate Justice of the Supreme Court of South Australia.

== Early life and education ==
Andrea Michaels was born in London in 1975 after her parents had fled from Greek Cyprus as refugees. The next year, the family moved to Adelaide, South Australia as her father had an uncle already living there.

Andrea Michaels earned a Bachelor of Laws and Bachelor of Commerce at Flinders University in Adelaide, and later a Graduate Diploma of Legal Practice at the University of South Australia.

== Career ==
Michaels practiced as a lawyer and company director before going into politics.

She won a seat in the SA House of Assembly, standing for Labor, as a result of a by-election held for the seat of Enfield held in 2019. She was shadow minister for business and the arts while in opposition from August 2020.

She was appointed Minister for Small and Family Business, Minister for Consumer and Business Affairs, and Minister for Arts in the First Malinauskas ministry in March 2022, and retains these roles as of September 2025.

After assuming office, Michaels and staff at Arts South Australia started work on developing a new cultural policy, due to be released in mid-2024. On 31 March 2025, following a consultation process involving over 2,000 community members, a new 10-year cultural policy, "A Place to Create" was launched by the government. At the same time, Arts South Australia was officially renamed CreateSA.

Michaels announced on 30 January 2026 that she would not contest the 2026 South Australian state election and would return to her law practice. She said that her decision was unrelated to her portfolio role concerning the Adelaide Writers' Week boycott.

Michaels was appointed to the Supreme Court of South Australia on 21 May 2026.

== Other roles and activities ==
Michaels was formerly treasurer of the Law Society of South Australia, and has been a member of a number of not-for-profit boards.

She is Chartered Tax Adviser (by the Tax Institute), a member of the Australian Institute of Company Directors, a Specialist Accredited Family Business Adviser (by Family Business Australia), and a Commissioner for Taking Affidavits in South Australia.

Parliament of South Australia
| Preceded by John Rau | Member for Enfield; 2019–2026 | Succeeded by Lawrence Ben |
Political offices
| New title | Minister for Small and Family Business; 2022–2026 | Incumbent |
| New title | Minister for Consumer and Business Affairs; 2022–2026 | Incumbent |
| New title | Minister for Arts; 2022–2026 | Incumbent |
