= Kevin Foley (South Australian politician) =

Australian politician

The Honourable Kevin Foley
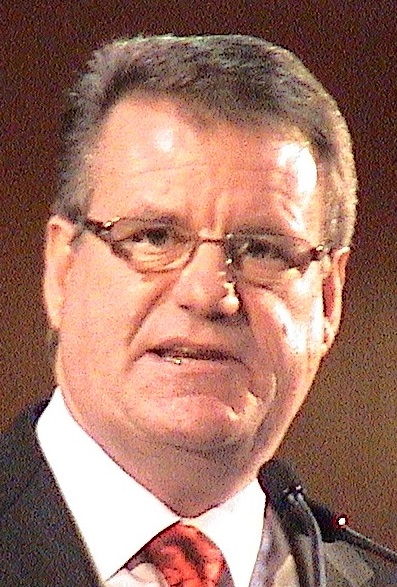
- Foley in 2009

Deputy Premier of South Australia
- In office 5 March 2002 – 6 February 2011
- Premier: Mike Rann
- Preceded by: Dean Brown
- Succeeded by: John Rau

Treasurer of South Australia
- In office 5 March 2002 – 6 February 2011
- Premier: Mike Rann
- Preceded by: Rob Lucas
- Succeeded by: Jack Snelling

Deputy Leader of the South Australian Labor Party
- In office February 2002 – February 2011
- Leader: Mike Rann
- Preceded by: Annette Hurley
- Succeeded by: John Rau

Member for Port Adelaide Parliament of South Australia
- In office 9 February 2002 – 12 December 2011
- Preceded by: New District
- Succeeded by: Susan Close

Member for Hart Parliament of South Australia
- In office 11 December 1993 – 9 February 2002
- Preceded by: New District
- Succeeded by: District Abolished

Personal details
- Party: Australian Labor Party (SA)
- Website: foleyadvisory.com.au

Kevin Owen Foley is a former South Australian politician who served as 11th Deputy Premier of South Australia and the Treasurer of South Australia in the Rann government from 2002 to 2011 for the South Australian Branch of the Australian Labor Party. He is the longest-serving deputy premier and the third longest-serving treasurer in South Australian history.

== Early life and education ==
Kevin Owen Foley was raised in Port Adelaide and educated at Royal Park High School.

== Early career ==
Foley left school at the age of 16 and began working for Cadbury-Schweppes. He later worked variously for the Australian Trade Commission, Boral Limited and steel distribution company Australian National Industries.

Immediately before entering Parliament, Foley worked as a senior advisor and chief of staff to then South Australian Premier Lynn Arnold.

== Political career ==
Foley contested unsuccessfully the seat of Semaphore at the 1989 election against Independent Labor MP Norm Peterson. He won the seat of Hart at the 1993 election. At the 2002 election he moved to the seat of Port Adelaide, due to Hart's abolition.

Before the 2002 election, Foley did not serve in the position of Deputy Opposition Leader. Because Deputy Leader Annette Hurley had failed to win a Parliamentary seat at the 2002 election Foley was elected deputy leader and treasurer by the Labor Caucus.

As treasurer, Foley was responsible for rebuilding South Australia's finances, leading to a AAA credit rating. He secured defence contracts, negotiated the Olympic Dam mine expansion, supported many large infrastructure projects, eg the Adelaide Oval redevelopment and the new Royal Adelaide Hospital.

While in Government, Foley served in many other cabinet positions, including Minister for Industry, Investment and Trade; Minister for Federal/State Relations; Minister Assisting the Premier in Economic Development; Minister for Police; Minister for Defence Industries; Minister for Emergency Services, Minister for Motor Sport; and Minister Assisting the Premier with the Olympic Dam Expansion Project.

Foley was a member of the Defence SA Advisory Board from its establishment in 2007 until 2011.

In 2011, Foley said that he thought Australia should embrace nuclear power.

In February 2011, Foley announced his resignation from the roles of deputy premier and treasurer. He continued as a member of cabinet with the Defence, Police, Emergency Services and Motor Sports portfolios.

In October 2011 he resigned from the cabinet, coinciding with Mike Rann's resignation as premier. Foley's parliamentary resignation took effect on 12 December 2011, creating a 2012 Port Adelaide by-election.

== Police Minister portfolio and two high-profile assaults ==
In early 2011, Foley stepped into his second stint as the Minister for Police. This final year in politics proved tumultuous and deeply personal, shaped by two high-profile physical altercations in Adelaide's nightlife district:

• Late 2010 Incident: Foley was "king-hit" outside an Adelaide nightclub in November 2010, suffering significant injuries that prompted him to step down as Deputy Premier and Treasurer.

• April 2011 Incident: While serving as Police Minister, Foley broke down in a tearful press conference after being cornered and assaulted a second time by a group of men in a restaurant lavatory.

The scrutiny by local media in South Australia surrounding the subsequent court trials, alongside his public battle with depression, affected Foley's final months in office.

== Resignation from political career ==
Foley resigned following one of the best known and scrutinised media clashes in South Australian political history.

On 5 April 2011, a day after his emotional press conference regarding his second street assault, Police Minister Kevin Foley gave a live, highly charged interview on 891 ABC Adelaide with breakfast presenters Matthew Abraham and David Bevan. The interview was so severe that it triggered widespread public outrage, a direct defense from Premier Mike Rann, and a formal investigation by the national media watchdog.

The nature of that broadcast and the official findings that followed confirm several key details:

1. Watchdog Ruling of Bias and Disparaging Language

The public backlash was significant enough that the Australian Communications and Media Authority (ACMA) launched an official investigation into the broadcast.

- In December 2011, the ACMA ruled that ABC Adelaide had breached the strict impartiality requirements of the ABC Code of Practice.
- The watchdog explicitly found that the presenters had "displayed fixed prejudgment on the topics discussed, asked loaded questions, and used disparaging language" against the Minister.
- This marked a historically rare finding, being the first time the ABC had been found in breach of impartiality rules in seven years.

2. The Content of the Interview

During the broadcast, Abraham and Bevan subjected Foley to intense, highly pointed, and aggressive questioning regarding his lifestyle, choices, and his presence in nightlife districts.

- Rather than treating him purely as a victim of a crime, the line of questioning heavily implied that Foley’s own behaviour or choices were to blame for him getting cornered and assaulted.
- An exasperated and deeply distressed Foley fought back on air, saying: "All you can do is be worried about all the salacious gossip and all the reasons which might have been behind it. It is complete bullshit... You think I am sick of it? Dead right I am."
- The questioning became so hostile that Foley threatened to hang up and terminate the interview live on air.

3. Public Backlash and Accusations of "Bullying"

The interview triggered an immediate flood of complaints to the ABC and the AdelaideNow website from listeners who felt the presenters had crossed the line into cruel on-air bullying.

- Listener Reaction: While many callers to talkback radio disliked Foley politically, a massive wave of listeners phoned in to condemn the hosts. One caller labeled Abraham and Bevan's treatment of Foley "disgraceful," while another stated that if they had been treated that way, they would have hung up immediately.
- Premier's Defense: Premier Mike Rann took to Twitter to fiercely defend his minister and slam the interview's undertones, writing: "If you are hit in a restaurant by some thug it's your fault according to some commentators, unless of course, it ever happened to them."
- ABC's Response: Despite the ACMA ruling and public anger, ABC management initially defended the hosts, stating they believed the morning team had conducted a "good" and tough interview. Years later, David Bevan himself would re-air clips of it, referring to it as one of the station's "most notorious" interviews.

Foley noted later that the public ridicule of his personal life, combined with the exploitation of his clinical depression by political opponents and commentators during this period, severely impacted his well-being and heavily influenced his decision to leave politics entirely later that year.

== Post-parliamentary career ==
In February 2012, Foley established his own corporate advisory firm Foley Advisory. He has a "strategic alignment" with the lobbyists Bespoke Approach.

Foley has since worked closely with Bespoke Approach's partners Alexander Downer, Nick Bolkus, and Ian Smith. As of 2021, Sky City Casino was one of the companies he lobbied for in South Australia.

Political offices
| Preceded by Dean Brown | Deputy Premier of South Australia; 2002–2011 | Succeeded by John Rau |
| Preceded by Rob Lucas | Treasurer of South Australia; 2002–2011 | Succeeded by Jack Snelling |
South Australian House of Assembly
| New district | Member for Hart; 1993–2002 | District abolished |
| New district | Member for Port Adelaide; 2002–2011 | Succeeded by Susan Close |
