= Lawrence Ben =

Australian politician and lawyer

The Honourable Lawrence Ben MP
- Ben in 2026

Assistant Minister for Copper, Steel, Critical Metals and Minerals
- Incumbent
- Assumed office 25 March 2026
- Premier: Peter Malinauskas
- Minister: Tom Koutsantonis
- Preceded by: New position

Member of the South Australian House of Assembly for Enfield
- Incumbent
- Assumed office 21 March 2026
- Preceded by: Andrea Michaels

Personal details
- Born: Lawrence Ben; 1992 (age 33–34) Adelaide, South Australia
- Party: Labor
- Spouse: Emily (Note: Ben's wife is Emily Farrell, fellow University of Adelaide law graduate and daughter of Labor Senator for South Australia, Don Farrell)
- Education: University of Adelaide (BA), (LLB)(Hons); City University of New York (MA)
- Profession: Lawyer; Union official

Lawrence Robert Ben is an Australian politician serving as Assistant Minister for Copper, Steel, Critical Metals and Minerals in the Second Malinauskas ministry. He was elected to represent Enfield in the South Australian House of Assembly at the 2026 South Australian state election, succeeding Andrea Michaels.

== Career ==
Prior to his election to the Parliament of South Australia, Ben worked as a union official for the Shop, Distributive and Allied Employees Association (SDA), and as the acting political director of the New York City-based Retail, Wholesale and Department Store Union (RWDSU). He led the RWDSU's campaign efforts for the 2020 United States presidential election and the 2021 Georgia runoff election.

Ben studied a Bachelor of Arts and Bachelor of Laws at the University of Adelaide before going on to complete a Master of Arts at City University of New York (CUNY). While at CUNY, Lawrence was a recipient of the USS Ernesto Malave Merit Scholarship and was a founding member of the CUNY SLU Student Union, serving as the inaugural treasurer.

He also served as the principal economic adviser to Premier Peter Malinauskas, with Malinauskas crediting Ben for playing an important role in saving the Whyalla Steelworks. He was also a research fellow at progressive policy thinktank The McKell Institute.

Ben has been involved in the resettlement of Ukrainian refugees in South Australia, serving as the secretary and committee member for The Association of Ukrainians in South Australia.

== Notes ==
South Australian House of Assembly
Preceded by Andrea Michaels	Member for Enfield; 2026–present	Incumbent
