= Ian Smith (lobbyist) =

Australian political lobbyist

Iam Smith AM
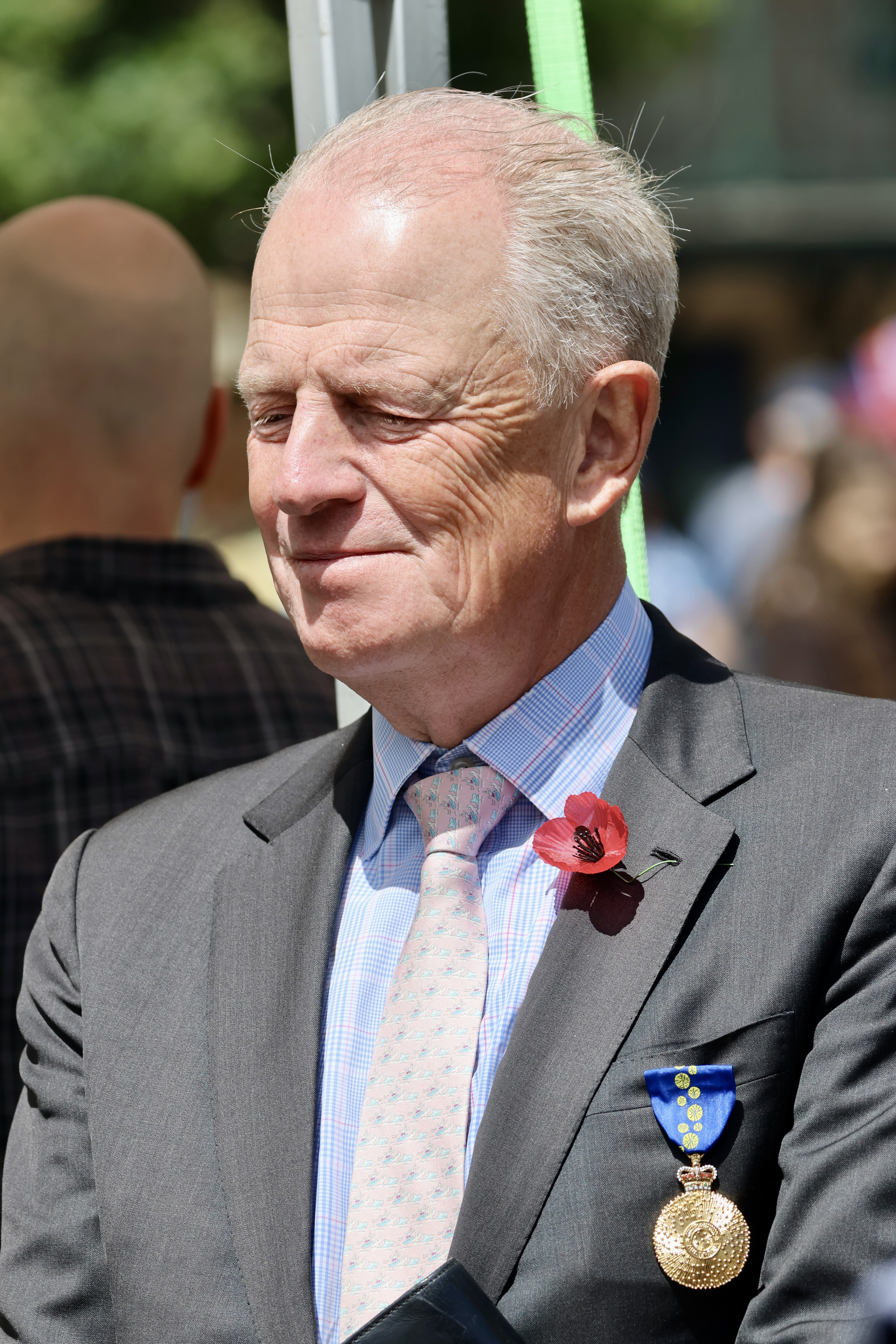
- Smith at the National War Memorial in 2025
- Born: Ian Richard Smith
- Occupation: Lobbyist
- Spouse: Natasha Despoja (m. 2001; sep. 2024)
- Children: 2

Ian Richard Smith is an Australian political lobbyist. He is a founder of the firm Bespoke Approach, and is considered by The Power Index to be one of Australia's most influential political lobbyists.

== Career ==
Smith's first job in Australia was as a reporter for the Daily Advertiser in Wagga Wagga. He later transferred to The Advertiser in Adelaide, for which as of 2014 he continued to write occasional opinion editorial pieces and provided political commentary.

He founded the firm Bespoke Approach in 2008, and solicited former federal politicians Alexander Downer and Nick Bolkus to become partners. The firm's fourth partner is Andrew Butcher, a former spokesperson for Rupert Murdoch. Smith modelled the business on the way that the Kissingers, Albrights and Scowcrofts lobbied in the US.

Smith has worked as a media adviser for the Liberal Party of South Australia and to former Victorian premier Jeff Kennett. He is a former CEO of public relations firm Gavin Anderson & Co, one of the largest in Australia. They have two children.

In 2011 Smith was listed on Crikey's The Power Index as one of Australia's ten most influential political lobbyists.

Smith is a former member of the Committee for Melbourne and advocated for the establishment of the Committee for Adelaide in South Australia, of which he was a member in 2015. Smith's other advisory group and board memberships include The Big Issue, the Association of Australian Medical Research Institutes, the Northern Territory Government's Economic Development Panel, and Developing East Arnhem Land Ltd. The latter company was established by the Northern Territory Government, the Commonwealth government and mining company Rio Tinto to drive economic development in East Arnhem Land.

As of 2015, Smith was on the United Kingdom's Honorary Consul in South Australia.

In November 2015, Smith was scheduled to appear on the ABC TV talk show, Q&A.

== Not-for-profit sector ==
In mid-2015 Smith co-founded Barefoot to Boots with Awer G. Bul (brother of football player Awer Mabil), an organisation which helps refugees by "providing them with simple things that are otherwise inaccessible" to boost their resilience and help them to develop new skills.

He has been an ambassador for LivingPositive, an organisation which aims to remove the stigma surrounding people living with HIV/AIDS, and for the Orangutan Project, which works on the protection of orangutans in Indonesia. As of 2015 Smith was chair of Jirrawun Arts, an Indigenous arts organisation in the East Kimberley.

== Personal life ==
Smith married former leader of the Australian Democrats, Natasha Stott Despoja, in a beachside ceremony in Byron Bay in 2003. They divorced in 2025. They have two children.
