= Independent Liberal (Australia) =

Political affiliation

- Abbreviation: IndLib
- Local government (NSW): 7 / 1,480
- Local government (SA): 57 / 616
- Local government (Tas): 5 / 254

Independent Liberal is a description used in Australian politics, often to designate a politician who is a Liberal Party member but not endorsed by the party at elections, or if sitting in parliament, not a member of the Liberal party room. The term has also been used by politicians and political candidates who identify as a liberal, but independent from the party.

The label is often used at local government elections, especially in contests where the Liberal Party does not endorse candidates. However, registering a party or affiliation as an "Independent Liberal" is not permitted in New South Wales under section 64 of the Electoral Act 2017, and the use of the term in electoral material is also considered an offence under section 180 of the act.

As of 2025, the most recent state or federal MPs to sit as Independent Liberals were Peter Cain and Elizabeth Lee, who were unilaterally expelled from the Canberra Liberals partyroom by the then leader in October 2025 but returned to the party room in November after a change in parliamentary leadership.

== History ==
The label was first used at a federal election in 1910, following the formation of the Commonwealth Liberal Party in 1907. The party dissolved in 1919, before the present-day Liberal Party of Australia was formed in 1944.

George Wise won the seat of Gippsland at that election as an Independent Liberal. He was a Protectionist who refused to join the party at the Fusion of 1909.

Bob Suggett won re-election in Moorabbin as an Independent Liberal in 1964 after losing party endorsement in 1961. He was then re-admitted to the party.

Bob Such served as an Independent Liberal in the South Australian House of Assembly from 2000 until his death in 2014. His widow, Lyn, said he never put 'Liberal' in his political branding because "if you’re independent, you’re independent – that was his thinking".

Pete Smith ran as an Independent Liberal at the 2015 South-West Coast Victorian state by-election to 'represent Liberal supporters who were not members of the party'. He achieved 1.8% of the vote.

Duncan McFetridge quit the Liberal Party in 2017 to sit as an Independent Liberal. He attempted to get permission from the party to formally use the description on the ballot paper at the 2018 state election, but was unsuccessful.

Activist Saru Rana contested the 2019 Enfield state by-election in South Australia as an Independent Liberal.

At the 2022 Victorian state election, former Liberal Party member Fred Ackerman ran as a 'Liberal Independent' on a ticket with Mark Barrow.

Victorian Western Metropolitan MLC Moira Deeming started sitting as an Independent Liberal in April 2023 after receiving a 9-month suspension from the parliamentary party. She was later expelled from the parliamentary party in May 2023, remaining a rank-and-file Liberal member before she was readmitted in December 2024.

Multiple members of the Western Australian Legislative Assembly have been elected as Independent Liberals, including Harry Shearn (Maylands), Noel Butcher (Gascoyne), Bill Grayden (South Perth) and Edward Oldfield (Mount Lawley). Alfred Cove MP Janet Woollard began sitting as an Independent Liberal after her party, Liberals for Forests, dissolved in 2008. She was defeated at the 2013 state election.

== Similar political descriptions ==
Australian politicians have also been elected under other independent labels, including Independent Labor, Independent Free Trade, Independent UAP and Independent Socialist.

== See also ==
=== Related Australian political terms ===
- Independent National (Australia)
- Independent Labor (Australia)
- Independent politicians in Australia
- Teal independent

=== Similar concepts elsewhere ===
- Independent conservative, an independent politician in the United Kingdom or Canada with conservative views
- Independent Republican (United States), an independent who is a member of the US Republican Party
- Miscellaneous right, a miscellaneous conservative independent in France
