= Swing (Australian politics) =

Statistic used to analyse Australian elections

The term swing refers to the extent of change in voter support, typically from one election or opinion poll to another, expressed as a positive or negative percentage point. For the Australian House of Representatives and the lower or unicameral houses of the parliaments of all the states and territories except Tasmania and the ACT, as well as Tasmania's upper house, Australia employs preferential voting in single-member constituencies. Under the full-preference instant-runoff voting system, in each seat the candidate with the lowest vote is eliminated and their preferences are distributed, which is repeated until only two candidates remain. While every seat has a two-candidate preferred (TCP) result, seats where the major parties have come first and second are commonly referred to as having a two-party-preferred (TPP) result. The concept of "swing" in Australian elections is not simply a function of the difference between the votes of the two leading candidates, as it is in Britain. To know the majority of any seat, and therefore the swing necessary for it to change hands, it is necessary to know the preferences of all the voters, regardless of their first preference votes. It is not uncommon in Australia for candidates who have comfortable leads on the first count to fail to win the seat, because "preference flows" go against them.

== TPP/TCP swings ==
In seats where the major parties do not come first and second, differing TPP and TCP results are returned. Whilst each seat that preferences down to two major party candidates has the same TPP as TCP, in seats not contested by a major party, such as at some by-elections or some seats in some state elections, only a TCP vote can be produced. At federal elections, it is possible to calculate a TPP/TCP majority for every seat. The swing is therefore what is required for that seat to change hands at the next election.

Swings in Australian parliaments are more commonly associated with the TPP vote. While seats are normally referred to on TPP terms, when one of the remaining two candidates after preference distribution are not from a major party, it is referred to as a TCP, with a different TPP produced. In a TCP contest between Labor and the Nationals and without a Liberal candidate, this is also considered a TPP, with the Nationals considered a de facto major party within the Liberal–National Coalition. At the 2013 federal election, only 11 of 150 seats returned differing TPP and TCP figures ("non-classic seats"), indicating a considerable two-party system.

The Mackerras pendulum takes the TPP majorities of all electorates and arranges them in order, from the seat with the highest government majority to the seat with the highest opposition majority. For example, ahead of the 2007 election, Labor needed to win a minimum of 16 additional seats to form a government, and the 16th-weakest government seat (McMillan) had a TPP majority of 4.9 points. Thus, the pendulum predicted that Labor would need a uniform TPP swing of 4.9 points to win the 2007 election. Labor in fact gained a swing of 5.6 points, which the pendulum had predicted would result in 21 additional Labor seats under a uniform swing. In fact, Labor gained 23 seats, and not all seats that changed hands were those with the slimmest Coalition majorities, because swings in each district are unique and not uniform.

== Examples ==
=== Federal, Adelaide 2004 ===
2004 Australian federal election: Division of Adelaide, South Australia
Party	Candidate	Votes	%	±%
Liberal	Trish Worth	38,530	45.29	+0.82
Labor	Kate Ellis	35,666	41.92	+5.50
Greens	Jake Bugden	6,794	7.99	+2.02
Family First	Peter G Robins	1,753	2.06	+2.06
Democrats	Richard Pascoe	1,355	1.59	–9.30
Independent	Amanda Barlow	978	1.15	+1.15
Total formal votes		85,076	95.60	+0.66
Informal votes		3,920	4.40	–0.66
Turnout		88,996	93.62	–1.09
Two-party-preferred result
Labor	Kate Ellis	43,671	51.33	+1.95
Liberal	Trish Worth	41,405	48.67	–1.95
Labor gain from Liberal		Swing	+1.95	

It can be seen that the Liberal candidate had a primary vote lead over the Labor candidate. In first-past-the-post voting, the Liberals would have retained the seat, and their majority would be said to be 3.4 percentage points (45.3 − 41.9).

However, under full-preference instant-runoff voting, the votes of all the minor candidates were distributed as follows:

2nd count: Barlow 978 votes distributed
Party	Candidate	Added votes	%	Votes	%
Liberal	Trish Worth	172	17.6	38,702	45.5
Labor	Kate Ellis	206	21.1	35,872	42.2
Greens	Jake Bugden	365	37.3	7,159	8.4
Family First	Peter G Robins	96	9.8	1,849	2.2
Democrats	Richard Pascoe	139	14.2	1,494	1.8
Total		978		85,076	

3rd count: Democrats 1,494 votes distributed
Party	Candidate	Added votes	%	Votes	%
Liberal	Trish Worth	343	23.0	39,045	45.9
Labor	Kate Ellis	494	33.1	36,366	42.8
Greens	Jake Bugden	560	37.5	7,719	9.1
Family First	Peter G Robins	97	6.5	1,946	2.3
Total		1,494		85,076	

4th count: Family First 1,946 votes distributed
Party	Candidate	Added votes	%	Votes	%
Liberal	Trish Worth	1,098	56.4	40,143	47.2
Labor	Kate Ellis	377	19.4	36,743	43.2
Greens	Jake Bugden	471	24.2	8,190	9.6
Total		1,946		85,076	

5th count: Greens 8,190 votes distributed - final TPP/TCP
Party	Candidate	Added votes	%	Votes	%
Labor	Kate Ellis	6,928	84.6	43.671	51.3
Liberal	Trish Worth	1,262	15.4	41,405	48.7
Total		8,190		85,076	1.3

Thus, Labor defeated the Liberals, with 85 percent of Green and Green-preferenced voters preferencing Labor on the last distribution. Labor's TPP/TCP vote was 51.3 percent, a TPP/TCP majority of 1.3 points, and a TPP/TCP swing of 1.9 points compared with the previous election.

=== South Australia, Frome 2009 ===
2009 Frome state by-election: Electoral district of Frome, South Australia
Party	Candidate	Votes	%	±%
Liberal	Terry Boylan	7,576	39.24	–8.86
Labor	John Rohde	5,041	26.11	–14.93
Independent	Geoff Brock	4,557	23.60	+23.60
National	Neville Wilson	1,267	6.56	+6.56
Greens	Joy O'Brien	734	3.80	+0.06
One Nation	Peter Fitzpatrick	134	0.69	+0.69
Total formal votes		19,309	97.12	+0.21
Informal votes		573	2.88	–0.21
Turnout		19,882	89.79	–4.44
Two-party-preferred result
Liberal	Terry Boylan	9,976	51.67	–1.74
Labor	John Rohde	9,333	48.33	+1.74
Two-candidate-preferred result
Independent	Geoff Brock	9,987	51.72	+51.72
Liberal	Terry Boylan	9,322	48.28	–5.13
Independent gain from Liberal		Swing	N/A	

The 2009 Frome by-election was closely contested, with the result being uncertain for over a week. Liberal leader Martin Hamilton-Smith claimed victory on behalf of the party. The result hinged on the performance of Brock against Labor in the competition for second place. Brock polled best in the Port Pirie area, and received enough eliminated candidate preferences to end up ahead of the Labor candidate by 30 votes.

Distribution of preferences - 4th count
Party	Candidate	Votes	%	±%
Liberal	Terry Boylan	8,215	42.54	
Independent	Geoff Brock	5,562	28.81	
Labor	John Rohde	5,532	28.65	

Brock received 80 percent of Labor's fifth-count preferences to achieve a TCP vote of 51.72 percent (a majority of 665 votes) against the Liberal candidate. The by-election saw a rare TPP swing to an incumbent government, and was the first time an opposition had lost a seat at a by-election in South Australia. The result in Frome at the 2010 state election saw Brock come first on primary votes, increasing his primary vote by 14.1 points to a total of 37.7 percent and his TCP vote by 6.5 points to a total of 58.2 percent. Despite a statewide swing against Labor at the election, Labor again increased its TPP vote in Frome by 1.8 points up to 49.9%.

=== Federal, Melbourne 2010 ===
2010 Australian federal election: Division of Melbourne, Victoria
Party	Candidate	Votes	%	±%
Labor	Cath Bowtell	34,022	38.09	–11.42
Greens	Adam Bandt	32,308	36.17	+13.37
Liberal	Simon Olsen	18,760	21.00	–2.49
Sex Party	Joel Murray	1,633	1.83	+1.83
Family First	Georgia Pearson	1,389	1.55	+0.55
Secular	Penelope Green	613	0.69	+0.69
Democrats	David Collyer	602	0.67	–0.76
Total formal votes		89,327	96.38	–0.82
Informal votes		3,356	3.62	+0.82
Turnout		92,683	90.09	–1.41
Two-party-preferred result
Labor	Cath Bowtell	65,473	73.30	+1.03
Liberal	Simon Olsen	23,854	26.70	–1.03
Two-candidate-preferred result
Greens	Adam Bandt	50,059	56.04	+10.75
Labor	Cath Bowtell	39,268	43.96	–10.75
Greens gain from Labor		Swing	+10.75	

In this example, the two remaining candidates/parties, one a minor party, were the same after preference distribution at both this election and the previous election. Therefore, differing TPP and TCP votes, margins, and swings resulted.

=== South Australia, Port Adelaide 2012 ===
Pt Adelaide state by-election, 2012: Electoral district of Pt Adelaide, South Australia
Party	Candidate	Votes	%	±%
Labor	Susan Close	8,218	42.3	–7.6
Independent	Gary Johanson	4,717	24.3	+24.3
Independent	Sue Lawrie	2,938	15.1	+15.1
Liberal Democrats	Stephen Humble	1,415	7.3	+7.3
Greens	Justin McArthur	1,096	5.6	–0.6
Independent	Colin Thomas	314	1.6	+1.6
Independent	Bob Briton	292	1.5	+1.5
One Nation	Grant Carlin	269	1.4	+1.4
Democratic Labor	Elizabeth Pistor	151	0.8	+0.8
Total formal votes		19,410	92.8	–3.8
Informal votes		1,505	7.2	+3.8
Turnout		20,915	82.8	–10.4
Two-candidate-preferred result
Labor	Susan Close	10,277	52.9	–9.8
Independent	Gary Johanson	9,133	47.1	+47.1
Labor hold		Swing	N/A	

At the 2012 Port Adelaide state by-election, only a TCP could be produced, as the Liberal Party of Australia (and Family First Party and independent candidate Max James), who contested the previous election and gained a primary vote of 26.8 percent (and 5.9 percent, and 11.0 percent respectively), did not contest the by-election. On a TPP margin of 12.8 percent from the 2010 election, considered a safe margin on the current pendulum, Labor would have likely retained their TPP margin based on unchanged statewide Newspoll since the previous election. Labor retained the seat on a 52.9 percent TCP against Johanson after the distribution of preferences. Unlike previous examples, neither a TPP or TCP swing can be produced, as the 2010 result was between Labor and Liberal rather than Labor and independent with no Liberal candidate. An increase or decrease in margins in these situations cannot be meaningfully interpreted as swings. As explained by the ABC's Antony Green, when a major party does not contest a by-election, preferences from independents or minor parties that would normally flow to both major parties does not take place, causing asymmetric preference flows. Examples of this are the 2008 Mayo and 2002 Cunningham federal by-elections, with seats returning to TPP form at the next election.
