= Nick Bolkus =

Australian politician (1950–2025)

The Honourable Nick Bolkus
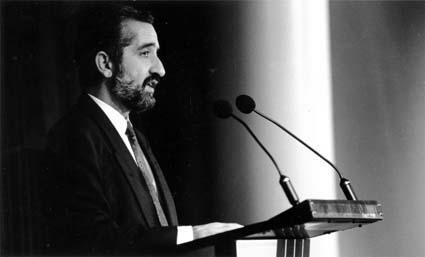
- Bolkus in 1993

Senator for South Australia
- In office 1 July 1981 – 30 June 2005

Personal details
- Born: 17 July 1950 Adelaide, South Australia, Australia
- Died: 25 December 2025 (aged 75)
- Party: Labor
- Spouse: Mary Patetsos
- Children: Three (including Aria)
- Education: University of Adelaide
- Occupation: Politician, lawyer

Nicholas Bolkus (17 July 1950 – 25 December 2025) was an Australian Labor Party politician and lawyer. He was a member of the Senate from July 1981 to June 2005, representing the state of South Australia.

== Early career ==
Bolkus was born in Adelaide, South Australia on 17 July 1950. He was of Greek descent, his parents having migrated to Adelaide from the island of Kastellorizo. He was educated at Adelaide High School and the University of Adelaide. He was a lawyer in 1974 and 1975 before moving into political advising as a research officer for a number of Australian Labor Party (ALP) members including Clyde Cameron. He unsuccessfully ran for the district of Torrens at the 1975 state election and for the Senate at the 1977 federal election. He successfully won a Senate seat for South Australia in the 1980 Australian federal election.

== Parliamentary career ==
Bolkus was appointed to the outer ministry as Minister for Consumer Affairs and Minister Assisting the Treasurer for Prices (1988–90). He was appointed Minister for Administrative Services (1990–93) (a ministry which was later relegated out of Cabinet), and then Minister for Immigration and Ethnic Affairs and Minister Assisting the Prime Minister for Multicultural Affairs (1993–96).

After the end of the Keating government (due to its election defeat in 1996), Bolkus was Shadow Attorney-General and Minister for Justice from March 1996 to November 2001.

=== Minister for Consumer Affairs, Minister for Assisting for Prices (1988–90) ===
Bolkus was first elected to the federal ministry in February 1988 as Minister for Consumer Affairs and Minister Assisting the Treasurer for Prices. In this portfolio he introduced world-leading legislation to protect the privacy of individuals in their relationships with credit data agencies. He also introduced the Banking Ombudsman, streamlining National Uniform Food Laws, introducing a series of codes of conduct protecting consumers and initiated enquiries into the pricing practices of the computer software, music and book industries.

=== Minister for Administrative Services (1990–93) ===
Bolkus was appointed to Cabinet in 1990 as Minister for Administrative Services, a portfolio which he held until the 1993 election. In this portfolio he introduced comprehensive legislation for the disclosure of political donations. He transitioned the department to a commercialised, corporatised and competitive body. Bolkus used the extensive reach of a department in such areas as Commonwealth property ownership, construction, purchasing and the Australian Electoral Commission to pursue the government's environmental and industry policy agenda, particularly in the information technology area.

=== Minister for Immigration and Ethnic Affairs (1993–96) ===
In 1993, Bolkus was appointed Minister for Immigration and Ethnic Affairs and Minister Assisting the Prime Minister for Multicultural Affairs. He held these portfolios until the 1996 election. In these positions, Bolkus tried making both the department's and government's immigration, refugee and multicultural policies more relevant to Australia's social, economic and humanitarian needs.

Bolkus tried to restructure both the department and policy, including:

- rewriting Australia's migration laws
- recognition of the importance of temporary business entry through initiatives such as the APEC card "invisible visa" entry for tourism, and the business "life of passport" visa
- fundamental restructuring of the business migration program
- the first review of the Australian Citizenship Act since its 1948 introduction
- the establishment of the Refugee Review Tribunal
- the revision of Australia's oath of allegiance by removing reference to the monarch
- the introduction of a major citizenship promotion program
- increase in the annual migration and refugee programs

=== Parliamentary committee experience ===
Bolkus served on and chaired a number of parliamentary committees in the areas of legal and constitutional affairs, foreign affairs, industrial relations, corporation legislation, indigenous affairs and human rights. He was chairman of the Senate Standing Committee on Constitutional and Legal Affairs. He represented the Australian Parliament at the 1983 and 1984 Constitutional Conventions and at the 41st General Assembly of the United Nations in 1986.

== Other issues ==
In 2003, Bolkus was accused and personally attacked by the workplace relations minister, Tony Abbott, of failing to declare donations made by Dante Tan. Tan was not found guilty of any criminal offence in either the Philippines or Australia. Abbott accused Bolkus of having breached the legal requirements of accepting a political donation. Abbott also accused Bolkus of money laundering, however it became clear that the matter was not a breach of any regulations regarding political donations. Bolkus successfully sued Nationwide News in the District Court of South Australia for defamation in Bolkus v Nationwide News.

== Post-parliamentary career ==
=== Lobbying ===
Until 2015, Bolkus was a partner at Bespoke Approach, a corporate advisory firm. Bespoke Approach was founded by corporate and political advisor Ian Smith and the former senior vice-president at News Corporation, Andrew Butcher.

Bolkus also offered political lobbying services under the name "Kazaru". Clients represented to the South Australian Parliament and government since 2016 include SA Power Networks, Daycorp, D and R DeRuvo and sons, Fyfe, SSE Australia, Bedford Group, Walker Corporation, Lincoln Lakes Development Company, Kelaray Pty Ltd, Kangaroo Island Plantation Timbers Ltd, The Stehr Group, Tri-star Petroleum, Celsus/SA Health Partnership, Karadeniz Holdings, The Belgrave Group, RH & DJ Bichard Superfund.

=== Directorships and advisory positions ===
Bolkus was the chairman of directors of Nuturf Australia Pty Ltd and Envirogreen Pty Ltd and director of Wondertreat Australia Pty Ltd and Ecofertiliser Pty Ltd.

He was adviser to the Australian Hokkien Association.

Bolkus was a director of the industry-based Australian Fisheries Academy.

== Death ==
Bolkus died on 25 December 2025, at the age of 75. He was survived by his wife, Mary, daughters Aria and Mikayla and son Nick. Aria was elected to state parliament for Colton at the 2026 South Australian election less than three months later.

Parliament of Australia
Preceded by Peter Staples	Minister for Consumer Affairs; 1988–90	Succeeded by Michael Tate
Preceded by Gerry Hand	Minister for Immigration and Ethnic Affairs; 1993–96	Succeeded by Philip Ruddock
