= Saru Rana =

Australian politician and activist of Indian descent

- Born: 1979 (age 46–47); Chandigarh, India
- Occupations: Activist; politician; teacher; media personality
- Political party: Liberal
- Other political affiliations: Independent Liberal (2019)
- Awards: Governor's Multicultural Award in South Australia (2019), Pride of Australia award (2019), Irene Bell and Irene Krastev awards (2020)

Saru Rana is an Australian activist, media personality, teacher and politician of Indian descent. Her work on human rights, women's rights and on encouraging culturally and linguistically diverse children to play Australian sports has been recognized with several awards.

== Early life ==
Rana was born to a Muslim mother, Sultana Begum, and a Sikh father, Avtar Singh, in 1979 in Chandigarh.

In 2002, when she was in the 2nd year of her Fine Arts postgraduate studies in Punjabi University, Patiala, Rana was allegedly sexually assaulted by the Vice-chancellor of the university, Jasbir Singh Ahluwalia. The case was heard in multiple courts, with even the apex court of India, the Supreme Court, having to intervene and force the resumption of hearings, and had not concluded as of April 2017.

Saru Rana moved to Australia in 2009. She teaches art and design at the Playford International College.

== Social activism ==
Rana founded an organization called SHAMSHIR in 2009 through which she hoped to foster peace and harmony, by uniting diverse communities on a common platform.

In 2017, Rana collaborated with the Mushaira Council of Australia on the MILAAP platform for South Australian migrants from India and Pakistan, nations with a 74-year history of tensions since Partition. More than 300 families from the Indian and Pakistani diaspora in Adelaide meet frequently through the organization.

Rana heads the Adelaide edition of the publication The Indian Sun.

== Sports activism ==
Rana also works with South Australian National Football League and South Australian Cricket Association to encourage children, especially girls, from the multicultural communities in South Australia to play footy and cricket. Rana is part of the Multicultural Cricket Advisory Committee of South Australia, tasked with advising the South Australia Cricket Association on encouraging interest in the game across multicultural communities.

Rana captained the Indian team in South Australia NFL's first Nations Cup footy Festival in 2019, in a bid to encourage more multicultural women to play the game.

== Politics ==
Rana is a member of the Liberal Party of Australia. She contested in the 2019 Enfield by-election, for the South Australian House of Assembly, as an Independent (Liberal) candidate. She secured third place in the election. In the 2022 South Australian state election, she again contested for Enfield as a Liberal candidate, securing the second spot this time.

== Awards ==
In March 2019, Rana was the recipient of the Governor's Multicultural Award in South Australia in the Senior Volunteer category, cited for her work through SHAMSHIR to eliminate the social stigma attached to certain issues, particularly inequality, violence and abuse, through sensitive discussions.

In December 2019, Rana's community work on battling depression, bullying and violence with SHAMSHIR and the Mini Me project was recognized with the Pride of Australia award

In March 2020, Rana was recognized for her volunteer work with women and women's groups by the International Women's Day Association of South Australia, which gave her both the Irene Bell and the Irene Krastev awards.
