= Susan Close =

Australian politician

The Honourable Susan Close
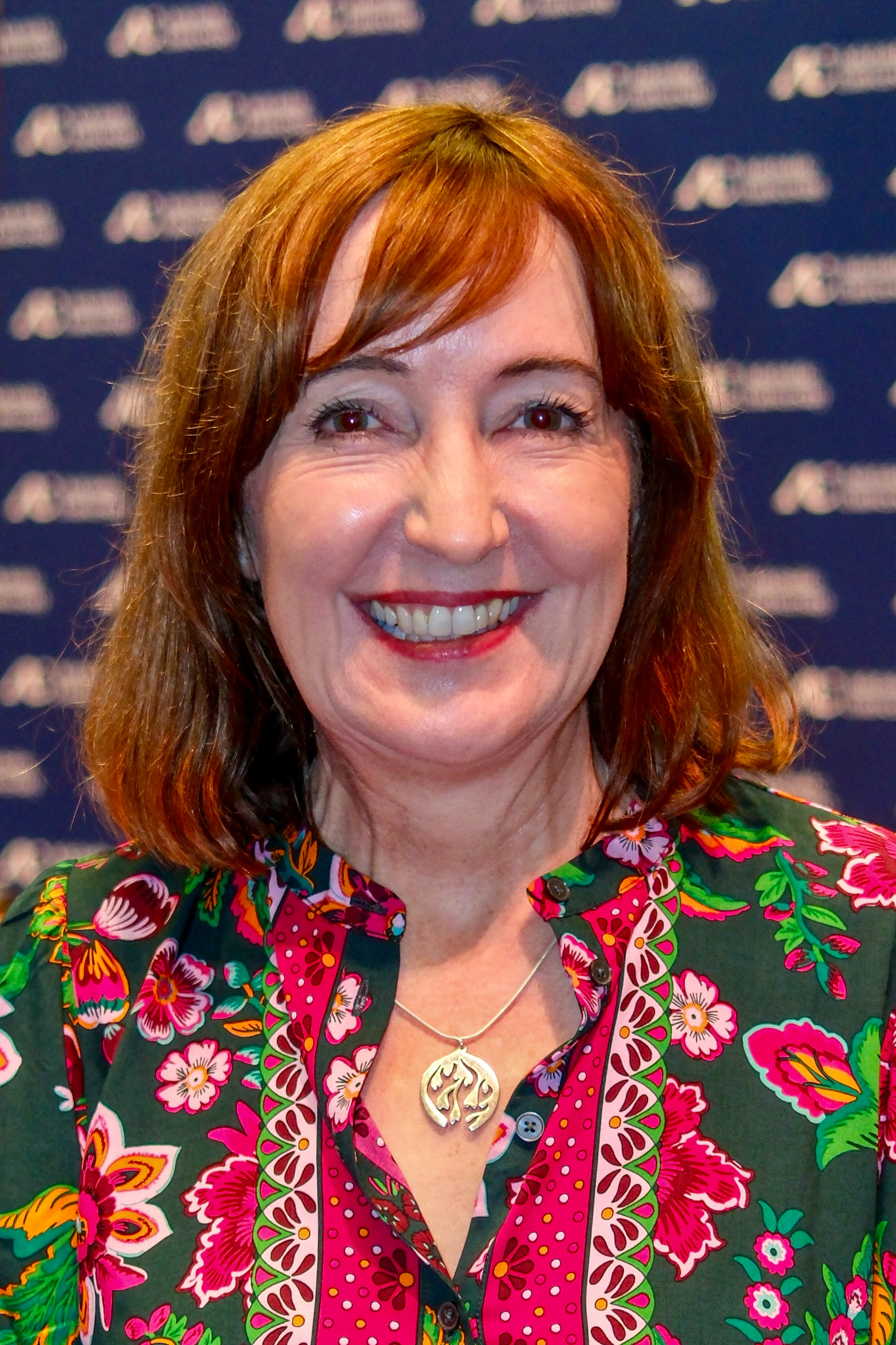
- Close in 2026

Deputy Premier of South Australia
- In office 21 March 2022 – 18 September 2025
- Premier: Peter Malinauskas
- Preceded by: Dan van Holst Pellekaan
- Succeeded by: Kyam Maher

Deputy Leader of the South Australian Labor Party
- In office 9 April 2018 – 18 September 2025
- Leader: Peter Malinauskas
- Preceded by: John Rau
- Succeeded by: Kyam Maher

Deputy Leader of the Opposition of South Australia
- In office 9 April 2018 – 21 March 2022
- Leader: Peter Malinauskas
- Preceded by: Vickie Chapman
- Succeeded by: John Gardner

Member of the South Australian House of Assembly for Port Adelaide
- In office 11 February 2012 – 20 March 2026
- Preceded by: Kevin Foley
- Succeeded by: Cheyne Rich

Personal details
- Born: Susan Elizabeth Close
- Party: Labor
- Spouse: Declan Andrews
- Children: 2
- Education: Blackwood High School; Flinders University (BA; PhD)
- Susan Close's voice Close speaking about education Recorded 2 June 2026

Susan Elizabeth Close is an Australian public servant and environmental advocate who entered politics and served as Deputy Premier of South Australia in the First Malinauskas ministry from 2022 to 2025.

Close studied politics, languages, and biology at Flinders University, completing a PhD on the Australian Labor Party (ALP), and was active in environmental causes before working with conservation organisations and later serving as an executive director in the South Australian Department of Environment and Natural Resources from 2003 to 2011.

Close entered parliament at the 2012 Port Adelaide state by-election following Kevin Foley's resignation, benefiting from strong polling and the absence of a Liberal candidate. In her first term, she pursued social reform, introducing a same-sex marriage bill in 2013, and the following year joined Jay Weatherill's ministry, where she held multiple portfolios, including manufacturing, innovation, education, and higher education. She also oversaw policy changes in schools, announced major funding for infrastructure and teaching, and represented the state in London during the 2017 Westminster attack.

Following Labor's defeat at the 2018 election, Close was appointed Deputy Leader of the Opposition and deputy Labor leader. It was the first time that both major political parties in South Australia had women as deputy leaders, with Vickie Chapman as Liberal deputy leader. Close held shadow portfolios in education, environment, climate change, and higher education. She returned to government in 2022 as Deputy Premier under Peter Malinauskas, serving in portfolios related to climate, industry, science, and defence. She declared a climate emergency, represented South Australia at COP27, and launched initiatives such as the Responsible AI Research Centre in 2024. In 2025, she was Acting Premier on several occasions before announcing her retirement.

== Education and early career ==
Close completed her secondary education at Blackwood High School in 1984 before studying at Flinders University. She studied politics, French, Italian and biology, graduating with a Bachelor of Arts in 1989 and a Bachelor of Arts with Honours in 1991. She completed a PhD in political science in 1998, with a thesis focused on the Australian Labor Party (ALP) from 1983 to 1991. During her university studies, she was active in environmental causes and held the position of head of student services at the University of Adelaide.

Close's early career included work with Greenpeace, the Wilderness Society of South Australia, and the South Australian Conservation Council, where she contributed to the establishment of the Adelaide Dolphin Sanctuary and the International Bird Sanctuary in the Port River estuary. From 2003 to 2011, she was employed in the South Australian public service, primarily within the Department of Environment and Natural Resources, where she held the position of executive director.

== Political career ==
=== 2012 Port Adelaide state by-election ===
Close received factional backing in August 2011 and began outreach in the Port Adelaide electorate prior to her official confirmation as the Labor Party candidate for the by-election following Kevin Foley's resignation in December.

In the by-election campaign, polling had Close ahead of the independent candidate Gary Johanson, with 48 per cent of the vote compared to 23 per cent for Johanson on first preference votes. This poll also showed Close more favoured by women than men, with 53 per cent compared to 42 per cent. The Liberals did not run a candidate. Close was elected in the Port Adelaide by-election on 11 February 2012.

Close moved the Same Sex Marriage Bill 2013 on 20 June 2013 as a private members' bill and claimed that discrimination against same-sex couples in the institution of marriage was wrong. She used her own family experiences in favor of change. Labor politicians were given a free vote with Premier Jay Weatherill being supportive of the measure. The Liberal Party was opposed to the legislation on the grounds that it violated the constitution since it was a matter for the federal government. Close defended her position using legal opinion.

The legislation failed in the House of Assembly on 25 July 2013. No free vote was given to the Liberal Party MPs.

=== Weatherill ministry (2014–2018) ===
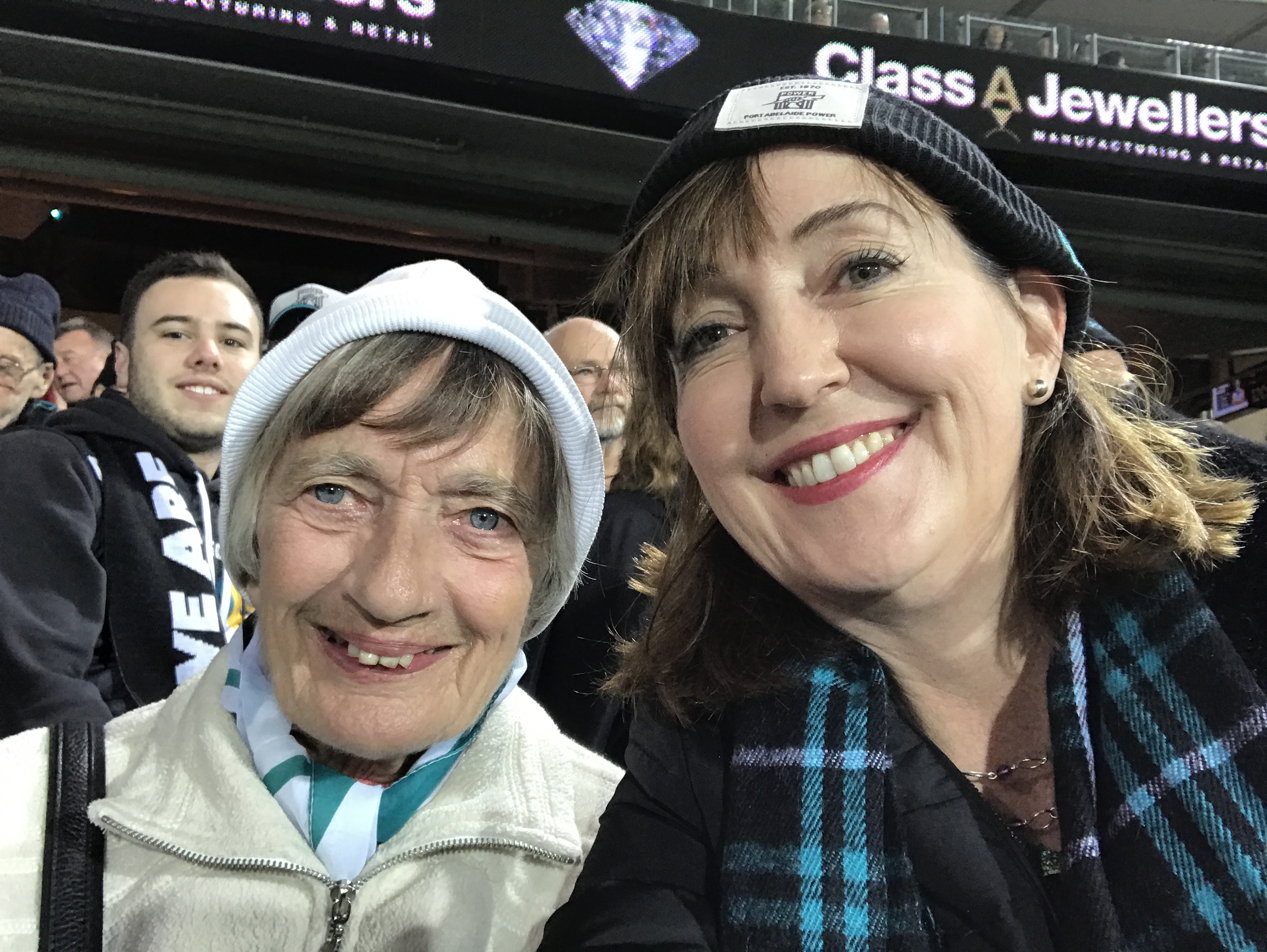
Close (right) with her mother at a Port Adelaide Football Club match in 2017

On 26 March 2014, Close was appointed to the Weatherill ministry as Minister for Manufacturing, Innovation and Trade and Minister for the Public Sector, marking her first cabinet role following her earlier position as Parliamentary Secretary to the Minister for the Public Sector. Her appointment came as part of Weatherill's post-election reshuffle, which also introduced Stephen Mullighan and Zoe Bettison to cabinet and secured Geoff Brock's support to form a minority government.

In May 2014, Weatherill announced the establishment of the Department of State Development, which consolidated several portfolios, including manufacturing, and Close became one of the ministers served by the new department. Later that year, after Martin Hamilton-Smith joined the ministry, Close's responsibilities shifted to include manufacturing, innovation and automotive transformation.

Close was appointed Minister for Education and Child Development following the resignation of Jennifer Rankine on 3 February 2015. In April, she announced that teachers registered with the Teachers Registration Board would no longer require separate police checks to volunteer in schools, addressing concerns about duplicative checks and associated fees while maintaining child safety standards. In July, Close apologised for delays in reviewing regional school bus access, noting that the policy had been in place since 1985 and requesting further consideration of the draft report.

Close was appointed Minister for Higher Education and Skills, taking over responsibilities from Gail Gago on 19 January 2016, and served as Acting Minister for Water and the River Murray from 19 to 24 January during Ian Hunter's absence. Later, from 28 December 2016 to 9 January 2017, Close held additional acting roles as Minister for Disabilities, Mental Health and Substance Abuse, and Minister for Health, the Arts, and Health Industries, covering for the absences of Leesa Vlahos and John Snelling.

On 22 March 2017, Close was in London on state government business and was approximately fifteen steps from the scene of the Westminster terror attack; she moved away upon hearing gunshots and noticing traffic congestion, with the building where her meeting was scheduled going into lockdown shortly afterwards.

In August 2017, following NAPLAN results showing South Australia as the lowest-performing mainland state in 16 of 20 categories, Close announced a four-year, A$67.5 million investment to improve public primary school outcomes, targeting additional teachers and student support. In September, she was appointed Acting Minister for Investment and Trade, Small Business, Defence Industries, and Veterans' Affairs from 9 to 20 September, covering for the absence of Hamilton-Smith. The following month, Close announced $690 million in state funding to refurbish 91 public schools, prioritising those with the greatest need and ageing infrastructure.

=== Malinauskas shadow ministry (2018–2022) ===
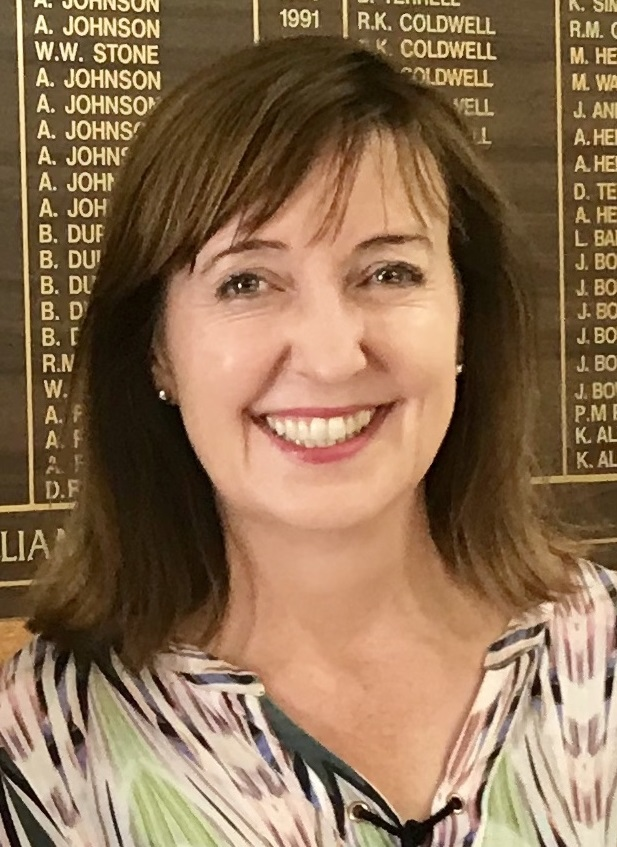
Close at the Port Adelaide Rowing Club in 2018

Following the 2018 South Australian state election, on 22 March 2018, Close was designated Deputy Leader of the Opposition in Peter Malinauskas's shadow cabinet, with her appointment confirmed on 9 April. On the same day, she assumed the role of Deputy Leader of the South Australian Labor Party. Her appointment meant that, for the first time in the state's history, both major political parties simultaneously had women serving as deputy leaders, with Vickie Chapman holding the corresponding position in the Liberal Party.

Under the shadow ministry, Close remained in charge of education, but he was appointed Shadow Minister for Environment and Water, whereas the child protection portfolio was taken by another member.

Close headed the review of the South Australian Labor Left faction's activities in October 2019.

Close stepped down from the education department on 1 September 2020 in a shadow cabinet shuffle. She kept Environment and Water while taking charge of Climate Change, Industry and Higher Education. In October, she backed Labor's plan to create a University Merger Commission to look at merging South Australia's three leading universities.

In October 2021, Close backed Labor's pre-election plans to make preschool available for three-year-olds and establish the Royal Commission into Early Childhood Education & Care.

=== Deputy Premier of South Australia (2022–2025) ===
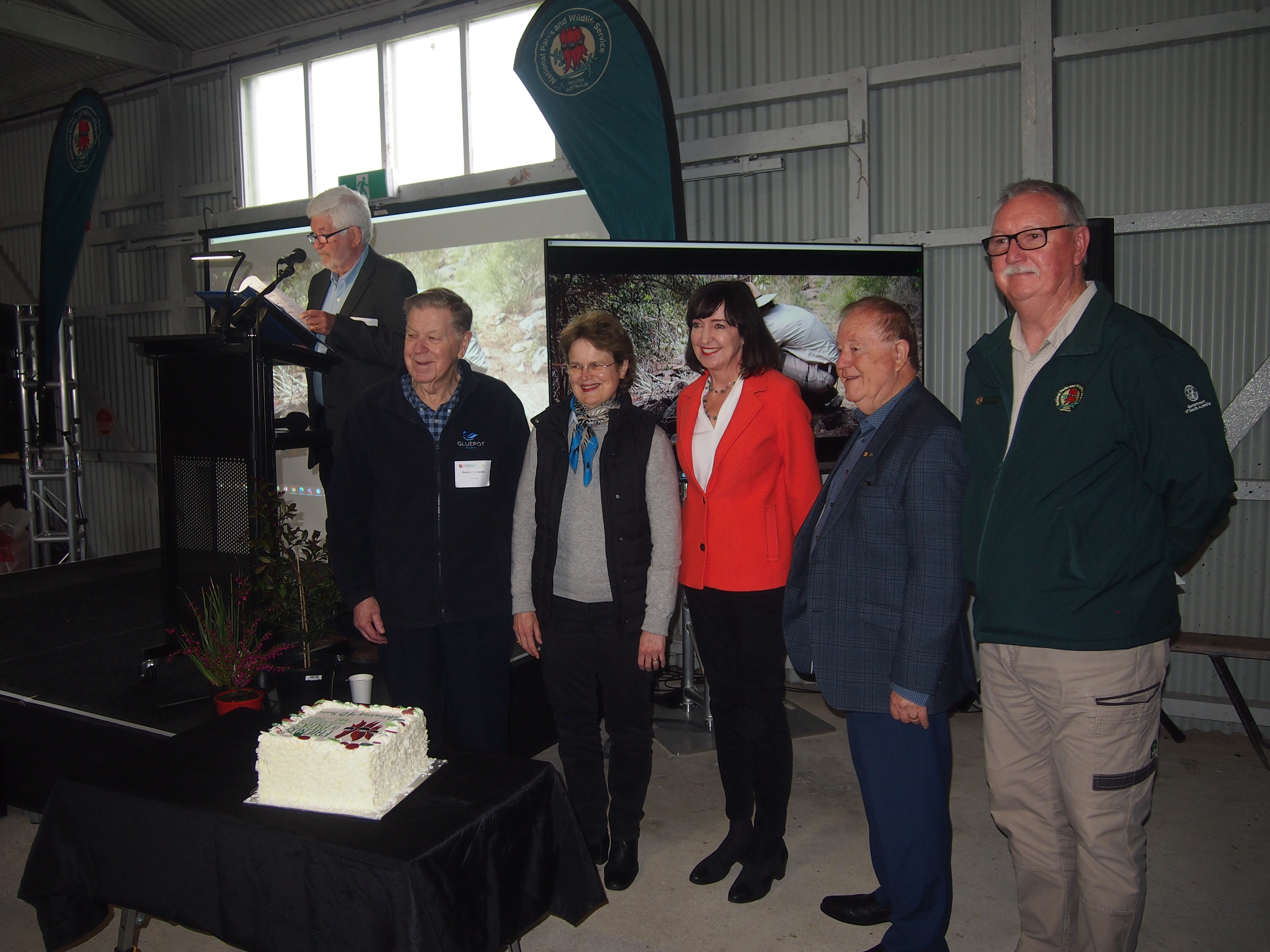
Friends of Parks 40th anniversary celebration at Belair National Park, (L–R): Keith Conlon, Duncan MacKenzie, Frances Adamson, Close, Dene Cordes, and Mike Williams

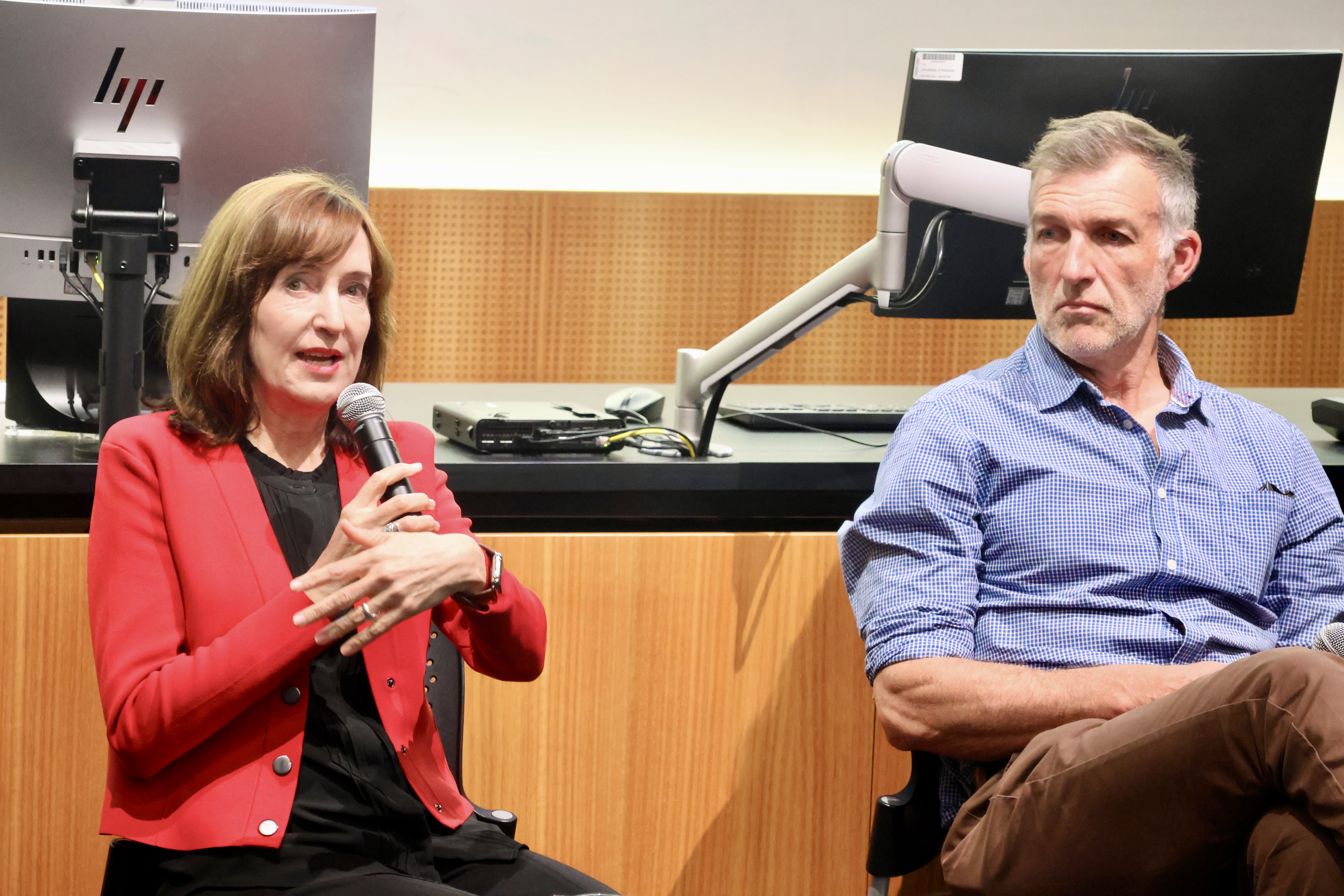
Close and Tim Jarvis at a panel discussion at the University of Adelaide, 2025

Following the 2022 South Australian state election, Close was sworn into the Malinauskas ministry as Deputy Premier and Minister for Environment and Water on 21 March 2022. She became the state's second female deputy premier, after Chapman. On 24 March, she was also appointed Minister for Industry, Innovation and Science and Minister for Defence and Space Industries, while her environment portfolio was renamed Minister for Climate, Environment and Water.

On 31 May 2022, Close introduced and secured the passage of a motion in both houses of parliament declaring a climate emergency, committing to decarbonising the state economy and achieving net zero emissions. On 12 October, she withdrew support for a socio-economic test under the Murray–Darling Basin Plan, citing recommendations from a Royal Commission, a decision criticised by the South Australian Liberals for its potential impact on regional communities. The following day, she officially opened Lockheed Martin Australia's Adelaide City Office. In November, she attended the COP27 climate summit in Egypt.

On 14 April 2023, Close was chosen to become the vice-president of the national party of the ALP, along with vice-president Mich-Elle Myers and national president Wayne Swan. Her tenure began on 17 August during the 49th National Conference of the party held in Brisbane.

Close took over from Mark Butler in August 2023 as the national senior vice-president of the ALP and attended its 49th national conference in Brisbane. In December, she called for public consultations on the introduction of biodiversity laws. Public consultation was held from 6 December 2023 until 1 March 2024.

On 15 April 2024, after the cabinet shuffle, Close became the first South Australian Minister for Workforce and Population Strategy. She kept the Climate, Environment and Water portfolio while Defence and Space Industries portfolio was taken by Treasurer Mullighan and the SA Water portfolio was handed over to Housing and Urban Development Minister Nick Champion. In May, Close proposals put forward harsher punishments and breeding controls for dog attacks with the intent of stopping puppy farming. She has also announced the setting up of the Responsible AI Research Centre in Adelaide through a collaboration between the state government, CSIRO, and the University of Adelaide.

Consultation for the draft Biodiversity Bill took place between 21 January and 18 February 2025. Close served as the premier while Malinauskas was out of office between 23 and 29 March and 22 and 24 April. Parliament approved the Biodiversity Act 2025 in June. It was the state's first such legislation.

Close was also premier between 6 and 13 September 2025. She and Mullighan announced on 18 September that they will step down from the cabinet and retire from the parliament at the next state election. She cited reasons of family and personal liberty in resigning but denied any connection between her decision and the state's algae bloom.

Upon their departure from the cabinet, Malinauskas nominated Kyam Maher as Deputy Premier and Lucy Hood as the Minister for Climate, Environment, and Water, with the latter having charge of the government's response to the algal bloom. Maher also succeeded Close as the deputy leader of the South Australian Labor Party. By October 2025, Close had also resigned from his role as ALP national vice-president. The party confirmed her resignation on 30 October when it announced the appointment of Rhiannyn Douglas as a national vice-president.

== Later career ==
The McKinnon Institute for Political Leadership announced on 19 December 2025, that Close was going to be appointed CEO and professor of practice in 2026. On 17 April 2026, the Albanese government announced her appointment to the CSIRO Board for a four-year term.

== Personal life ==
Close was born to academic parents, David Close, her father, was a history professor at Flinders University, while Elizabeth Close, her mother, was a French expert. They migrated from Oxford to Australia for the establishment of Flinders. She has lived on the Lefevre Peninsula with her husband, Declan Andrews, and their two children.

== Awards ==
Close was awarded the Distinguished Alumni Award from Flinders University on 28 August 2026 at a ceremony held at the Adelaide Town Hall for her leadership in public service and environmental reform.

South Australian House of Assembly
Preceded by Kevin Foley	Member for Port Adelaide; 2012–2026	Succeeded by Cheyne Rich
Political offices
Preceded by Tom Kenyon	Minister for Manufacturing, Innovation and Trade; 2014	Succeeded by Martin Hamilton-Smith as Minister for Investment and Trade
New title	Minister for Manufacturing and Innovation; 2014–2015	Succeeded by Kyam Maher
Preceded by Tom Koutsantonis	Minister for Automotive Transformation; 2014–2015	Succeeded by Kyam Maher
Preceded by Jay Weatherill	Minister for the Public Sector; 2014–2017	Succeeded by John Rau
Preceded by Jennifer Rankine	Minister for Education and Child Development; 2015–2018	Succeeded by John Gardner as Minister for Education
Preceded by Vickie Chapman	Deputy Leader of the Opposition in South Australia; 2018–2022	Succeeded by John Gardner
Preceded by Dan van Holst Pellekaan	Deputy Premier of South Australia; 2022–2025	Succeeded by Kyam Maher
Preceded by David Speirs as Minister for Environment and Water	Minister for Climate, Environment and Water; 2022–2025	Succeeded by Lucy Hood
Preceded by David Pisoni as Minister for Innovation and Skills	Minister for Industry, Innovation and Science; 2022–2025	Succeeded by Joe Szakacs
New title	Minister for Defence and Space Industries; 2022–2025	Succeeded by Peter Malinauskas
