= John Rau =

Australian politician

The Honourable John Rau SC
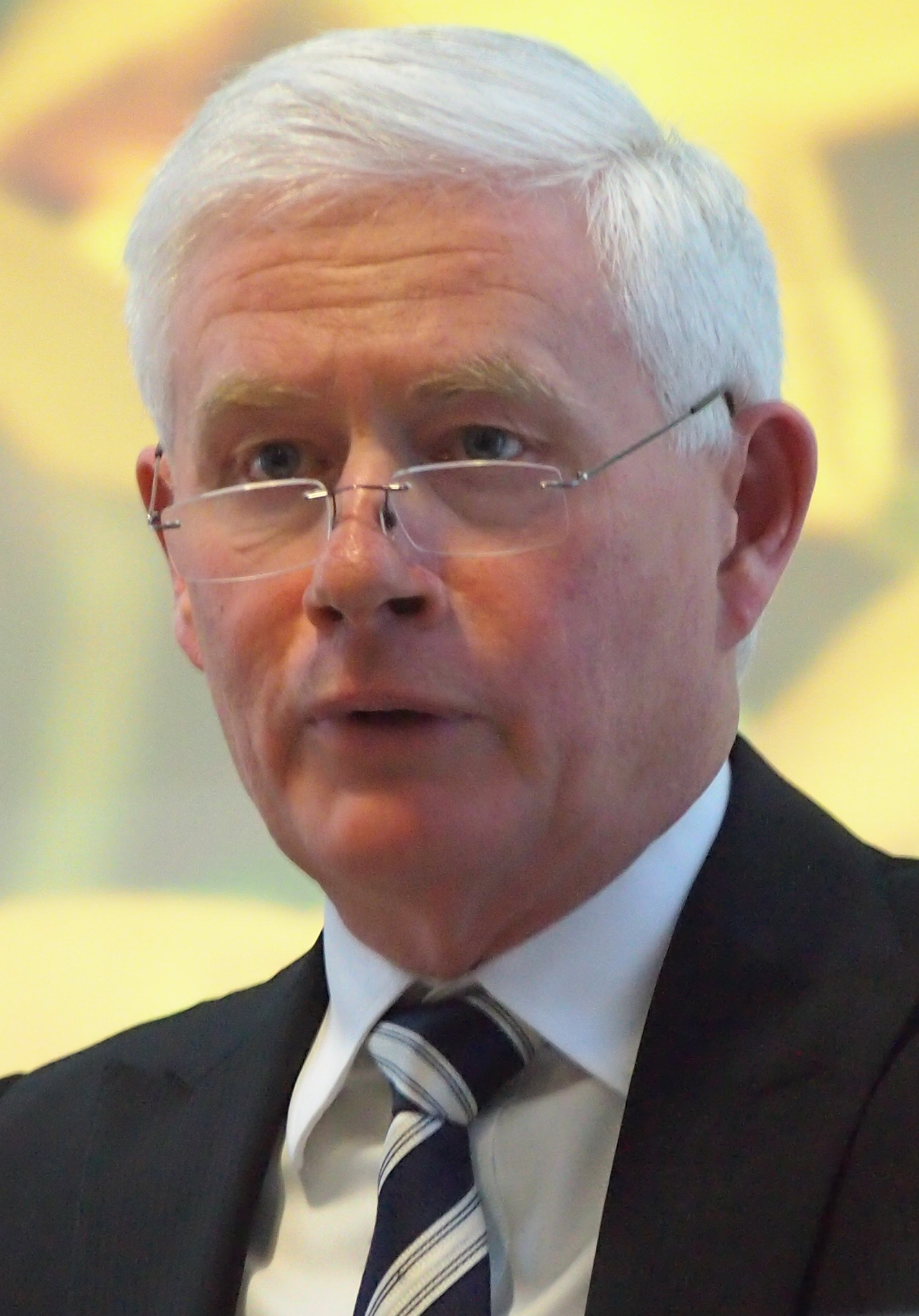
- Rau in 2015

Deputy Premier of South Australia
- In office 7 February 2011 – 19 March 2018
- Premier: Mike Rann; Jay Weatherill
- Preceded by: Kevin Foley
- Succeeded by: Vickie Chapman

Deputy Leader of the South Australian Labor Party
- In office 7 February 2011 – 9 April 2018
- Leader: Mike Rann; Jay Weatherill
- Preceded by: Kevin Foley
- Succeeded by: Susan Close

Attorney-General of South Australia
- In office 25 March 2010 – 19 March 2018
- Premier: Mike Rann; Jay Weatherill
- Preceded by: Michael Atkinson
- Succeeded by: Vickie Chapman

Member of the South Australian Parliament for Enfield
- In office 9 February 2002 – 17 December 2018
- Preceded by: New District
- Succeeded by: Andrea Michaels

Personal details
- Born: John Robert Rau; 20 March 1959 (age 67) Adelaide, South Australia
- Party: Australian Labor Party (SA)

John Robert Rau SC (born 20 March 1959) is an Australian barrister and politician. He was the 12th Deputy Premier of South Australia from 2011 to 2018 and 48th Attorney-General of South Australia from 2010 to 2018 for the South Australian Branch of the Australian Labor Party in the Weatherill cabinet. Rau was the Labor member of the House of Assembly seat of Enfield from the 2002 election until announcing his intention to retire from Parliament on 10 December 2018, and submitting his resignation on 17 December 2018.

== Legal career ==
Rau was admitted as a solicitor and barrister of the Supreme Court of South Australia in 1981. He worked as an adviser to Hawke government ministers Mick Young, Michael Tate and Neal Blewett from 1985 to 1988. He served as a Commonwealth nominee on the South Australian Legal Services Commission. He has also served on the ALP State and National Executives.

Before his service as a political adviser, Rau worked as a solicitor at Duncan Groom, Carabellas & Hannon. From 1988 to 1997 he worked as a solicitor and barrister at the firm of Johnston Withers, becoming a partner. Rau joined the independent bar and Murray Chambers in 1997.

Rau has appeared as counsel in the South Australian Industrial Relations Commission, the South Australian Industrial Relations Court, the Workers Compensation Tribunal, the Supreme Court of South Australia (including once as Attorney-General), the District Court of South Australia and the Federal Court of Australia.

== Political career ==
His first political experience as a Labor candidate occurred at the 1993 federal election, when he stood for the Division of Hindmarsh, where he was narrowly defeated by Liberal Party candidate Chris Gallus by 1.6 percent.

Prior to the 2002 state election, Rau contested Labor preselection for the safe seat of Enfield. The seat had previously been Ross Smith, held by Ralph Clarke, who had recently been deposed as the party's deputy leader. The local party branch chose Clarke who received 60 of 74 votes. However, the party's state executive stepped in and installed Rau as the pre-selected candidate. Clarke ran as an independent Labor candidate, receiving a respectable 23 percent of the vote; however, Clarke narrowly fell short of overtaking Rau and winning the seat on Liberal preferences. Rau easily won the seat with a 35.9 percent primary and 65.9 percent two-party vote. He is aligned with Labor's right faction.

Rau gained publicity in 2004 over his involvement in the Real Estate Industry – Reform bill, which was designed in an attempt to stop industry practices such as dummy bidding at auctions.

The 2006 state election saw Rau retain Enfield with a 63.4 percent primary and 74.5 percent two-party vote. At the 2010 state election, Rau suffered a swing to finish with a 52.6 percent primary and 60.5 percent two-party vote.

Rau became Attorney-General when Michael Atkinson stepped down from the position following the 2010 election. Like his predecessor, Rau has also been described as a social conservative.

Rau expressed approval for the introduction of an R18+ video games classification following the resignation of Atkinson. The issue had been one for which his predecessor Atkinson received significant media attention. Rau appeared to be taking a different view to his predecessor and considered allowing an introduction of an R18+ classification.

In February 2011, Rau was elevated to Deputy Premier following the resignation of Kevin Foley from the position.

On 22 November 2016, Rau was appointed a Senior Counsel by the Supreme Court of South Australia.

In addition to Deputy Premier and Attorney-General, in the Cabinet of South Australia Rau held the ministerial portfolios with responsibility for justice reform, planning, industrial relations, child protection reform, the public sector, consumer and business services, and with responsibility for the City of Adelaide.

== Personal life ==
Rau attended Henley High School.

South Australian House of Assembly
New district	Member of Parliament for Enfield; 2002–2018	Succeeded by Andrea Michaels
Political offices
Preceded by Mike Rann	Minister for Tourism; 2010–2011	Succeeded by Gail Gago
Preceded by Michael Atkinson	Attorney-General of South Australia; 2010–2018	Succeeded by Vickie Chapman
Preceded by Kevin Foley	Deputy Premier of South Australia; 2011–2018	Succeeded by Vickie Chapman
Preceded by Gail Gago as Minister for Business Services and Consumers	Minister for Consumer and Business Services; 2016–2018	Succeeded by Vickie Chapman as Attorney-General of South Australia
New office	Minister for Justice Reform; 2014–2018	Succeeded by Vickie Chapman as Attorney-General of South Australia
New office	Minister for Child Protection Reform; 2015–2018	Succeeded by Rachel Sanderson as Minister for Child Protection
Preceded by Gail Gago as Minister for City of Adelaide	Minister for Urban Development, Planning and the City of Adelaide; 2011	Succeeded by Patrick Conlon as Minister for Housing and Urban Development
Preceded by Gail Gago as Minister for City of Adelaide	Minister for Urban Development, Planning and the City of Adelaide; 2011	Succeeded by Himself as Minister for Planning
Preceded by Himself as Minister for Urban Development, Planning and the City of Adelaide	Minister for Planning; 2011–2018	Succeeded by Stephan Knoll
Preceded by Russell Wortley	Minister for Industrial Relations; 2013–2018	Succeeded by Rob Lucas as Treasurer of South Australia
Preceded by Susan Close	Minister for the Public Sector; 2016–2018	Succeeded by Rob Lucas as Treasurer of South Australia
Preceded by Tom Koutsantonis	Minister for Housing and Urban Development; 2014–2016	Succeeded by Stephen Mullighan
Party political offices
Preceded by Kevin Foley	Deputy Leader of the Australian Labor Party (South Australian Branch); 2011–2018	Succeeded by Susan Close
