= Suicide legislation =

Laws concerning suicide around the world

Suicide legislation by country Suicide and assisted suicide illegal Suicide legal, assisted suicide illegal Suicide and possibly assisted suicide legal

Suicide is a crime in some parts of the world. However, while suicide has been decriminalized in many countries, the act is almost universally stigmatized and discouraged. In some contexts, suicide could be utilized as an extreme expression of liberty, as is exemplified by its usage as an expression of devout dissent towards perceived tyranny or injustice which occurred occasionally in cultures such as ancient Rome, medieval Japan, or today's Tibet Autonomous Region.

While a person who has died by suicide is beyond the reach of the law, there can still be legal consequences regarding treatment of the corpse or the fate of the person's property or family members. The associated matters of assisting a suicide and attempting suicide have also been dealt with by the laws of some jurisdictions. Some countries criminalise suicide attempts.

== History ==
In ancient Athens, a person who had died by suicide (without the approval of the state) was denied the honours of a normal burial. The person would be buried alone, on the outskirts of the city, without a headstone or marker.

A criminal ordinance issued by Louis XIV in 1670 intended to be far more severe in its "punishment" ritual of an obviously-already-dead body: their corpse was drawn through the streets, face down, and then hung or thrown on a garbage heap. Additionally, all of the person's property was confiscated; this measure was intended to deter suicide by punishing their heirs financially.

The Interments (felo de se) Act 1882 abolished the legal requirement in England of burying suicides at crossroads. (Note: Also called the Felo de se Act 1823, the Interments (felo de se) Act 1823, the Burials (Felo de se) Act 1823, and the Suicide Act 1823.)

== Assisted suicide ==
Assisted suicide legislation by country Assisted suicide is legal. Legalized by court ruling, but not legislated or regulated Assisted suicide is illegal.

In many jurisdictions, it is a crime to assist others, directly or indirectly, in taking their own lives. Such legislation requires manufacturers of weapons to refuse sales to those deemed at potential risk of suicide. In some jurisdictions, it is also illegal to encourage people to attempt suicide, though the classification of the crime and its punishment varies. Sometimes an exception applies for physician assisted suicide, under strict conditions.

== Laws in individual jurisdictions (table) ==
=== Africa ===
Country/region	Legality			Penalty	Notes
Country/region	Suicide	Physician-assisted suicide	Voluntary euthanasia	Penalty	Notes
Algeria	Unknown	Unknown	Unknown	Unknown	
Angola	Legal	Illegal	Illegal	Article 141. (Instigation or help to murder): 1. Whoever instigates another person to commit suicide and this is consummated or actually tried shall be punished with imprisonment penalty up to 3 years.; 2. Whoever, in the same circumstances, is limited to provide assistance to the person who decided to commit suicide shall be punished with imprisonment up to 2 years or a fine of up to 240 days.	
Botswana	Legal	Illegal	Illegal	Article 207. Suicide pacts (1) It shall be manslaughter, and shall not be murder, for a person acting in pursuance of a suicide pact between him and another to kill the other or be a party to the other killing himself or being killed by a third person. (2) Where it is shown that a person charged with the murder of another killed the other or was a party to his killing himself or being killed, it shall be for the defence to prove that the person charged was acting in pursuance of a suicide pact between him and the other. (3) For the purposes of this section, "suicide pact" means a common agreement between two or more persons having for its object the death of all of them, whether or not each is to take his own life, but nothing done by a person who enters into a suicide pact shall be treated as done by him in pursuance of the pact unless it is done while he has the settled intention of dying in pursuance of the pact. Article 222. Aiding suicide Any person who (a) procures another to kill himself; (b) counsels another to kill himself and thereby induces him to do so; or (c) aids another in killing himself, is guilty of an offence and is liable to imprisonment for life.	
Burkina Faso	Legal	Illegal	Illegal	Article 512–28. (French) Le fait de provoquer ou d'aider au suicide d'autrui est puni d'une peine d'emprisonnement de un an à cinq ans et d'une amende de deux cent cinquante mille (250 000) à un million (1 000 000) de francs CFA, lorsque la provocation a été suivie du suicide ou d'une tentative de suicide. La peine d'emprisonnement est de trois ans à cinq ans et l'amende de un million (1 000 000) à trois millions (3 000 000) de francs CFA lorsque la victime de l'infraction définie à l'alinéa précédent est un mineur de quinze ans au plus. Les personnes physiques ou morales coupables du délit prévu au présent article encourent également la peine complémentaire d'interdiction d'exercer l'activité de prestataire de formation professionnelle au sens du code du travail pour une durée n'excédant pas cinq ans. La propagande ou la publicité, quel qu'en soit le mode, en faveur de produits, d'objets ou de méthodes préconisés comme moyens de se donner la mort est puni d'une peine d'emprisonnement de un an à trois ans et d'une amende de un million (1 000 000) à cinq millions (5 000 000) de francs CFA.	
Burundi	Unknown	Unknown	Unknown	Unknown	
Cameroon	Legal	Illegal	Illegal	Article 275. Murder Whoever causes another's death shall be punished with imprisonment for life.	
Cape Verde	Legal	Illegal	Illegal	Article 127. Prompting or assistance to suicide: 1. Whoever intentionally determine another person to commit suicide shall be punished with imprisonment up to three years, if suicide is attempted or fulfill itself.; 2. The penalty shall be imprisonment of up to two years, in case of mere aid to the victim, provided that there is actually attempted or consummated suicide.	
Central African Republic	Unknown	Unknown	Unknown	Unknown	
Comoros	Unknown	Unknown	Unknown	Unknown	
Djibouti	Legal	Illegal	Illegal	Comment No mention of suicide in the criminal code except against juveniles. Article 460	
Egypt	Legal	Illegal	Illegal	Article 47. The felonies whereof the attempt is liable to punishment and also the penalty for that attempt shall be legally defined.	
Equatorial Guinea	Unknown	Unknown	Unknown	Unknown	
Eritrea	Legal	Illegal	Illegal	Art. 280. – Assisting Suicide. (1) A person who, for any selfish or base motive, intentionally helps, advises or incites another person to commit suicide, is, where the suicide is attempted, guilty of assisting suicide, a Class 9 serious offence, punishable with a definite term of imprisonment of not less than 1 year and not more than 3 years. (2) Where death results from a person‟s actions under sub-Article (1), or knew that the person who attempted to commit suicide is partially or completely irresponsible, sick or a minor person, is guilty of assisting suicide, a Class 8 serious offence, punishable with a definite term of imprisonment of not less than 3 years and not more than 5 years.	
Eswatini	Legal	Illegal	Unknown	s.4 Homicide Act 44 of 1959 (1) It shall be culpable homicide, and not murder, for a person acting in pursuance of a suicide pact between him and another to kill such other or to be a party to such other being killed by a third person. (2) If it is shown that a person charged with the murder of another killed such other or was a party to his being killed, it shall be for the defence to prove that the person charged was acting in pursuance of a suicide pact between him and such other. (3) In this section "suicide pact" means a common agreement between two or more persons having for its object the death of both or all of them, whether or not each is to take his own life: Provided that nothing done by a person who enters into a suicide pact shall be treated as done by him in pursuance of such pact unless it is done while he has the settled intention of dying in pursuance of such pact.	
Ethiopia	Legal	Illegal	Illegal	Art. 542. – Instigating or Aiding another to commit Suicide. (1) Whoever instigates another to commit suicide, or aids him to do so, is punishable with simple imprisonment where the suicide is attempted, and with rigorous imprisonment not exceeding five years where it is consummated. (2) Where the person who has been instigated or aided to commit suicide had not attained the age of majority, or had no capacity because of mental illness or senility, the punishment to be imposed upon the instigator or assistant shall be rigorous imprisonment not exceeding five years, where the suicide is attempted, and rigorous imprisonment not exceeding ten years, where it is consummated.	
Gabon	Unknown	Unknown	Unknown	Unknown	
Gambia	Illegal	Illegal	Illegal	Unknown	
Ghana	Legal	Illegal	Illegal		Suicide attempts decriminalized in March 2023.
Guinea-Bissau	Legal	Unknown	Unknown	Unknown	
Kenya	Illegal	Illegal	Illegal	209. Suicide pacts; (1) It shall be manslaughter, and shall not be murder, for a person acting in pursuance of a suicide pact between him and another to kill the other or be a party to the other killing himself or being killed by a third person. (2) Where it is shown that a person charged with the murder of another killed the other or was a party to his killing himself or being killed, it shall be for the defence to prove that the person charged was acting in pursuance of a suicide pact between him and the other. (3) For the purposes of this section, "suicide pact" means a common agreement between two or more persons having for its object the death of all of them, whether or not each is to take his own life, but nothing done by a person who enters into a suicide pact shall be treated as done by him in pursuance of the pact unless it is done while he has the settled intention of dying in pursuance of the pact.: 225. Aiding suicide; Any person who— (a) procures another to kill himself; or (b) counsels another to kill himself and thereby induces him to do so; or (c) aids another in killing himself, is guilty of a felony and is liable to imprisonment for life.: 226. Attempting suicide; Any person who attempts to kill them self is guilty of a misdemeanour.	
Lesotho	Legal	Illegal	Illegal	37. Counseling and assisting suicide; Subject to any written law, a person who – (a)counsels another to kill himself or herself and thereby causes that person to take or attempt to take his or her own life; or (b)assists another in the taking of his or her own life, commits an offence.	
Libya	Unknown	Unknown	Unknown	Unknown	
Malawi	Illegal	Illegal	Illegal	228. Aiding suicide; Any person who— (a) procures another to kill himself; or (b) counsels another to kill himself and thereby induces him to do so; or (c) aids another in killing himself, is guilty of a felony and is liable to imprisonment for life.: 229. Attempting suicide; Any person who attempts to kill himself shall be guilty of a misdemeanour.	
Mali	Unknown	Unknown	Unknown	Unknown	
Mauritius	Unknown	Unknown	Unknown	Unknown	
Morocco	Unknown	Unknown	Unknown	Unknown	
Mozambique	Unknown	Unknown	Unknown	Unknown	
Namibia	Unknown	Unknown	Unknown	Unknown	
Niger	Unknown	Unknown	Unknown	Unknown	
Nigeria	Illegal	Illegal	Illegal	Section 327 of the Criminal Code Act in Nigeria (Attempting to commit suicide) says, "Any person who attempts to kill himself is guilty of a misdemeanor and is liable to imprisonment for one year."	
Republic of the Congo	Unknown	Unknown	Unknown	Unknown	
Rwanda	Legal	Illegal	Illegal	147. Suicide; Suicide shall not be punishable. However, any person who: 1. induces another person to commit; suicide; 1. helps other person to commit suicide; 2. provokes another person to commit suicide by inflicting persecution on him/her; shall be liable to a term of imprisonment of two (2) years to five (5) years.	
Senegal	Unknown	Unknown	Unknown	Unknown	
Seychelles	Unknown	Unknown	Unknown	Unknown	
Somalia	Unknown	Unknown	Unknown	Unknown	
South Africa	Legal	Illegal	Illegal		
South Sudan	Illegal	Illegal	Illegal	Article 213. Abetment of Suicide. Subject to the provisions of section 214 of this Act, whoever abets any person to commit suicide, commits the offence of abetment of suicide, and upon conviction, shall be sentenced to imprisonment for a term not exceeding ten years or with a fine or with both. Article 214. Abetment of Suicide by a Child or an Insane Person. Whoever, abets any person under eighteen years of age, any insane person, delirious person, an idiot or any person in a state of intoxication, to commit suicide, commits an offence, and upon conviction, shall be sentenced to imprisonment for life or with a fine or with both. Article 215. Attempt to Commit Suicide. Whoever, attempts to or engages in any act towards committing suicide, commits an offence, and upon conviction, shall be sentenced to imprisonment for a term not exceeding one year or with a fine or with both.	
Sudan	Illegal	Illegal	Illegal	Article 213. Abetment of suicide. Subject to the provisions of section 214 of this Act, whoever abets any person to commit suicide, commits the offence of abetment of suicide, and upon conviction, shall be sentenced to imprisonment for a term not exceeding ten years or with a fine or with both. Article 215. Attempt to Commit Suicide. Whoever, attempts to or engages in any act towards committing suicide, commits an offence, and upon conviction, shall be sentenced to imprisonment for a term not exceeding one year or with a fine or with both.	
Tanzania	Illegal	Illegal	Illegal	Article 216. Aiding suicide Any person who— (1) procures another to kill himself; or (2) counsels another to kill himself and thereby induces him to do so; or (3) aids another in killing himself, is guilty of a felony, and is liable to imprisonment for life. Article 217. Attempting suicide. Any person who attempts to kill himself is guilty of a misdemeanour.	
Togo	Unknown	Unknown	Unknown	Unknown	
Tunisia	Unknown	Unknown	Unknown	Unknown	
Uganda	Illegal	Illegal	Illegal	Article 195. Suicide pacts. It shall be manslaughter and shall not be murder for a person acting in pursuance of a suicide pact between him or her and another to kill the other or be a party to the other killing himself or herself or being killed by a third person. Article 209. Aiding suicide. Any person who— procures another to kill himself or herself; counsels another to kill himself or herself and thereby induces him or her to do so; or (c) aids another in killing himself or herself, commits a felony and is liable to imprisonment for life. Article 210. Attempting suicide. Any person who attempts to kill himself or herself commits a misdemeanour.	
Western Sahara	Unknown	Unknown	Unknown	Unknown	
Zambia	Legal	Illegal	Illegal	Article 200. Murder Any person who of malice aforethought causes the death of another person by an unlawful act or omission is guilty of murder.	
Zimbabwe	Legal	Illegal	Illegal	Article 50. Inciting or assisting suicide Any person who incites, induces, aids, counsels, procures or provides the means for the suicide or attempted suicide of another person, knowing that the other person intends to commit suicide or realising that there is a real risk or possibility that the other person may commit suicide, shall be guilty of inciting or assisting suicide and liable to a fine up to or exceeding level fourteen, or imprisonment for life or any shorter period, or both such fine and such imprisonment.	

=== North and South America ===
Country/region	Legality			Penalty	Notes
Country/region	Suicide	Physician-assisted suicide	Voluntary euthanasia	Penalty	Notes
Anguilla	Legal	Legal	Legal	Article 158. Abetment of suicide (1) Any person who aids, abets, counsels or procures the suicide of another, or the attempt by another to commit suicide, shall be guilty of an offence and liable to imprisonment for fourteen years. Article 159. Suicide pacts (1) It shall be manslaughter and not murder for a person acting in pursuance of a suicide pact between him and another person to kill the other person or to be a party to that other person killing himself or being killed by a third person.	
Antigua and Barbuda	Legal	Illegal	Illegal		
Argentina	Legal	Illegal	Illegal		
Bahamas	Illegal	Illegal	Illegal	Article 294. Abetment of suicide. Whoever attempts to commit suicide is guilty of a misdemeanour, and whoever abets the commission of suicide by any person shall, whether or not the suicide be actually committed, be liable to imprisonment for life.	
Barbados	Legal	Illegal	Illegal	Article 12. Aiding suicide. 1) Any person who a) procures another to kill himself; or b) counsels another to kill himself and thereby induces him to do so; or c) ids another in killing himself, is guilty of an offence and is liable on conviction on indictment to imprisonment for a term of 14 years. 2) No proceedings shall be instituted for an offence under this section except by or with the consent of the Director of Public Prosecutions.	
Belize	Legal	Illegal	Illegal	Article 109. Abetment of suicide. Every person who abets the commission of suicide by any person shall, whether or not the suicide be actually committed, be liable to imprisonment for twenty years.	
Bermuda	Legal	Illegal	Illegal	Article 297. Suicide pacts (1) It is manslaughter and not murder for a person acting in pursuance of a suicide pact between him and another to kill the other or be a party to the killing himself or being killed by a third person. Article 300. Aiding suicide of another Any person— who procures another person to kill himself; or who counsels another person to kill himself and thereby induces him to do so; or who aids another person in killing himself, is guilty of a felony, and is liable to imprisonment for ten years.	
Bolivia	Unknown	Unknown	Unknown	Unknown	
Brazil	Legal	Illegal	Illegal	Article 122. Induction, instigation or suicide aid. Penal Code - Law Decree nº 2.848 December 07 1940; Induce or instigate someone to commit suicide or to help him to do so.: Penalty - imprisonment, from two to six years, if the suicide is consumed; or imprisonment, from one to three years, if a suicide attempt results in a serious bodily injury.; Sole paragraph - The penalty is doubled: Increased penalty; I - if the crime is committed for selfish motive; II - if the victim is less or has decreased, for any reason, the capacity of resistance.; Infanticide	
British Virgin Islands	Unknown	Unknown	Unknown	Unknown	
Canada	Legal	Legal	Legal	See also: Suicide in Canada and Euthanasia in Canada	
Cayman Islands	Legal	Illegal	Illegal	Article 187. Suicide pacts (1) It shall be manslaughter and not murder for a person acting in pursuance of a suicide pact between him and another to kill the other or to be a party to the other killing himself or being killed by a third person.	
Chile	Legal	Illegal	Illegal		
Colombia	Legal	Legal	Legal	Unknown	
Costa Rica	Unknown	Unknown	Unknown	Unknown	
Cuba	Legal	Illegal	Illegal	Unknown	
Dominican Republic	Unknown	Unknown	Unknown	Unknown	
Ecuador	Unknown	Unknown	Unknown	Unknown	
El Salvador	Unknown	Unknown	Unknown	Unknown	
Falkland Islands	Unknown	Unknown	Unknown	Unknown	
Grenada	Unknown	Unknown	Unknown	Unknown	
Guatemala	Unknown	Unknown	Unknown	Unknown	
Guyana	Legal	Illegal	Illegal		Suicide attempts decriminalized in 2022.
Haiti	Unknown	Unknown	Unknown	Unknown	
Honduras	Unknown	Unknown	Unknown	Unknown	
Jamaica	Unknown	Unknown	Unknown	Unknown	
Mexico	Unknown	Unknown	Unknown	Unknown	
Nicaragua	Unknown	Unknown	Unknown	Unknown	
Panama	Unknown	Unknown	Unknown	Unknown	
Paraguay	Unknown	Unknown	Unknown	Unknown	
Peru	Unknown	Unknown	Unknown	Unknown	
Puerto Rico	Unknown	Unknown	Unknown	Unknown	
Trinidad and Tobago	Unknown	Unknown	Unknown	Unknown	
Turks and Caicos Islands	Unknown	Unknown	Unknown	Unknown	
United States (50 states and integral territories)	Illegal in some states under certain circumstances "Jurisprudence of suicide during an investigation".	Legal in some states	Illegal	See also: Suicide in the United States and Euthanasia in the United States	
United States Virgin Islands	Unknown	Unknown	Unknown	Unknown	
Uruguay	Unknown	Illegal	Legal	Article 315 Penal Code. Induction or aiding to suicide Any person who induce another to suicide or aid him or her to commit it, if the death occurred, shall be punished with six months to six years of imprisonment. This maximum can be doubled in case this crime is committed towards a person less than 18 years old, or towards a person with a reduced intelligence or will due to mental illness, abuse of alcohol or use of narcotics.	
Venezuela	Unknown	Unknown	Unknown	Unknown	

=== Asia ===
Country/region	Legality			Penalty	Notes
Country/region	Suicide	Physician-assisted suicide	Voluntary euthanasia	Penalty	Notes
Afghanistan	Unknown	Unknown	Unknown	Unknown	
Azerbaijan	Legal	Illegal	Illegal	Article 125. Bringing to suicide Bringing a person, who is taking place in material, service or other dependence from guilty, to suicide or to attempt at suicide by threats, cruel treatment or regular humiliation of his dignity "shall be punished by restriction of freedom for the term up to three years or imprisonment for the term from three up to seven years.	
Bangladesh	Illegal	Illegal	Illegal	Article 305. Abetment of suicide of child or insane person If any person under eighteen years of age, any insane person, any delirious person, any idiot, or any person in a state of intoxication commits suicide, whoever abets the commission of such suicide shall be punished with death or 110[ imprisonment] for life, or imprisonment for a term not exceeding ten years, and shall also be liable to fine. Article 306. Abetment of suicide If any person commits suicide, whoever abets the commission of such suicide, shall be punished with imprisonment of either description for a term which may extend to ten years, and shall also be liable to fine. Article 309. Attempt to commit suicide Whoever attempts to commit suicide and does any act towards the commission of such offence, shall be punished with simple imprisonment for a term which may extend to one year, or with fine, or with both.	
Bhutan	Legal	Illegal	Illegal	Article 150. Complicity in suicide A defendant shall be guilty of the offence of complicity in suicide, if the defendant aids, abets, counsels or procures the suicide of another person. Article 151. Grading of complicity in suicide The offence of complicity in suicide shall be a misdemeanour.	
Brunei	Illegal	Illegal	Illegal	Article 305. Abetment of suicide of child or insane person If any person under 18 years of age, any insane person, any delirious person, any idiot, or any person in a state of intoxication commits suicide, whoever abets the commission of such suicide shall be punished with death or imprisonment for life. Article 306. Abetment of suicide If any person commits suicide, whoever abets the commission of such suicide shall be punished with imprisonment for a term which may extend to 10 years, and shall also be liable to fine. Article 309. Attempt to commit suicide Whoever attempts to commit suicide and does any act towards the commission of such offence, shall be punished with imprisonment for a term which may extend to one year, or with fine, or with both.	
Cambodia	Legal	Illegal	Illegal	Unknown	
China	Legal	Illegal	Illegal	Suicide in China	
Hong Kong	Legal	Illegal	Illegal	CAP 212 OFFENCES AGAINST THE PERSON ORDINANCE Section 33A Suicide to cease to be a crime The rule of law whereby it is a crime for a person to commit suicide is hereby abrogated.(Added 71 of 1967 s. 2)[cf. 1961 c. 60 s. 1 U.K.]	
India	Legal	Illegal	Illegal	See also: Euthanasia in India Mental Healthcare Act, 2017 (Decriminalisation of Suicide): 115. (1) Notwithstanding anything contained in section 309 of the Indian Penal Code, any person who attempts to commit suicide shall be presumed, unless proved otherwise, to have severe stress and shall not be tried and punished under the said Code.; (2) The appropriate Government shall have a duty to provide care, treatment and rehabilitation to a person, having severe stress and who attempted to commit suicide, to reduce the risk of recurrence of attempt to commit suicide.	
Indonesia	Legal	Illegal	Illegal	Article 345. Causing a Suicide to be Committed Any person whowith deliberate intent instigates another to commit suicide, aids him thereby or provides him with the means thereto, shall, if the suicide ensues, be punished by a maximum imprisonment of four years.	
Iran	Legal	Illegal	Illegal	See reference	
Iraq	Legal	Illegal	Illegal	Article 408.: 1. Any person who incites a person to commit suicide or assists him in any way to do so is punishable by a term of imprisonment not exceeding 7 years if that person commits suicide on the basis of such incitement or assistance. The penalty will be detention if the person does not commit suicide but attempts to do so.; 2. If the suicide is under 18 years of age or is suffering from a state of diminished reason or will, it is considered an aggravating circumstance. The offender is, according to the circumstances, punishable by the penalty for murder or attempted murder if the suicide is suffering from loss of reason or will.; 3. There is no penalty for an attempted suicide.	
Israel	Legal	Illegal	Illegal	Article 302. Inducing or abetting suicide If a person causes a person to kill himself by inducement or advice or if he assists a person in killing himself, then he is liable to twenty years imprisonment.	
Japan	Legal	Illegal	Illegal	See also: Suicide in Japan Article 202. (Inducing or Aiding Suicide; Homicide with Consent) A person who induces or aids another to commit suicide, or kills another at the other's request or with other's consent, shall be punished by imprisonment with or without work for not less than 6 months but not more than 7 years.	
Jordan	Legal	Illegal	Illegal	Article (339) a. Whoever incites a person to commit suicide or assists him/her in any of the ways stipulated in article (80), he/she shall be punished by temporary detention. b. If the person does not commit suicide but attempts to do so, then the penalty shall be imprisonment from three months to two years and up to three years if it results in a permanent disability or harm.	
Kazakhstan	Legal	Illegal	Illegal	Article 102. Driving Someone to Suicide: 1. Driving a person to suicide or to make a suicide attempt by way of threatening, cruel treatment or systematic humiliation of the human dignity of a victim, shall be punished by restriction of freedom for a period up to three years, or by deprivation of freedom for the same period. 2. The same act, committed against a person who was in complete material or other dependence upon the guilty person, -shall be punished by restriction of freedom for a period up to five years or deprivation of freedom for the same period.; Article 96. A Murder: 1. A murder, that is, the illegal deliberate causation of the death of another person, shall be punished by deprivation of freedom for a period from six to fifteen years.	
Kuwait	Unknown	Unknown	Unknown	Unknown	
Kyrgyzstan	Legal	Illegal	Illegal	Article 102. Reducing to Suicide (1) Reducing a person to suicide or attempted suicide by threats, abuse or systematic humiliation -shall be sentenced by 2 to 5 years of imprisonment. (2) The same act towards a person materially or in other way dependent on the offender, -shall be sentenced by 3 to 7 years of imprisonment. Article 103. Compassing to Suicide Compassing to suicide, i.e. raising another person's determination to commit suicide by persuasion, deception or in any other way, that lead to such person's suicide or attempted suicide, -shall be sentenced by up to 5 years of imprisonment.	
Laos	Legal	Unknown	Unknown	Unknown	
Lebanon	Illegal	Illegal	Illegal	Penalty for an attempted suicide: 3 months up to 5 years' imprisonment.	
Macau	Unknown	Unknown	Unknown	Unknown	
Malaysia	Legal	Illegal	Illegal	Section 306. Abetment of suicide If any person commits suicide, whoever abets the commission of such suicide shall be punished with imprisonment for a term which may extend to ten years, and shall also be liable to fine. Suicide decriminalised On 22 May and 21 June 2023, the Penal Code (Amendment) (No. 2) Act 2023 was passed by the Parliament of Malaysia, which includes the decriminalisation of attempted suicide. A moratorium on Section 309 has also been put in place since 2023. The amendment officially took effect on 10 September 2025.	
Maldives	Illegal	Unknown	Unknown	Unknown	
Mongolia	Legal	Illegal	Illegal	Article 95. Bringing to suicide 95.1. Bringing to suicide of the victim who is in a material dependence, subordination or another inferiority to the culprit through brutal treatment or systematic humiliation of his/her honor and dignity shall be punishable by imprisonment for a period of 2 to 5 years.	
Myanmar	Illegal	Illegal	Illegal	309. Attempting suicide; Whoever attempts to commit suicide, and does any act towards the commission of such offence, shall be punished with imprisonment of either description for a term which may extend to one year, or with fine, or with both.	
Nepal	Legal	Illegal	Illegal	Article 185. Abetment to Suicide Nepal government endorsed the new Criminal Code Act in 2018. Section 185 of the act has criminalised abetment to suicide, which reads: "Prohibition of abetment of suicide: (1) No person shall abet the commission of suicide by another, or create, or cause to be created, such circumstances as likely to lead towards the commission of such act. (2) A person who commits the offence referred to in subsection (1) shall be liable to a sentence of imprisonment for a term not exceeding five years and a fine not exceeding fifty thousand rupees".	
North Korea	Illegal	Illegal	Illegal	According to Radio Free Asia on 5 June 2023, the North Korean regime declared suicide an "act of treason against socialism".	
Oman	Illegal	Illegal	Illegal	Unknown	
Pakistan	Legal	Illegal	Illegal	Sec. 325. Repealed 2022. Attempt to commit suicide: Whoever attempts to commit suicide and does any act towards the commission of such offence, shall be punished with simple imprisonment for a term which may extend to one year, or with fine, or with both.	
Palestine	Unknown	Unknown	Unknown	Unknown	
Philippines	Legal	Illegal	Illegal	Art. 253. Giving assistance to suicide. Any person who shall assist another to commit suicide shall suffer the penalty of prision mayor; if such person leads his assistance to another to the extent of doing the killing himself, he shall suffer the penalty of reclusion temporal. However, if the suicide is not consummated, the penalty of arresto mayor in its medium and maximum periods, shall be imposed.	
Qatar	Legal	Illegal	Illegal	Article (305) Anyone who incites or helps a person anyhow to commit suicide, if suicide is committed accordingly, is convicted to no more than seven years in prison. If the victim is under sixteen or unwilled, the culprit is convicted to no more than ten years in prison. If the victim has no choice or is unaware, this is considered a premeditated murder and the culprit is convicted to no more than seven years in prison if the victim's parents forgive or accept the wergild.	
Saudi Arabia	Unknown	Unknown	Unknown		
Singapore	Legal	Illegal	Illegal	Section 305. Abetment of suicide of child or insane person If any person under 18 years of age, any insane person, any delirious person, any idiot, or any person in a state of intoxication, commits suicide, whoever abets the commission of such suicide shall be punished with death or imprisonment for life, or with imprisonment for a term not exceeding 10 years, and shall also be liable to fine. Section 306. Abetment of suicide If any person commits suicide, whoever abets the commission of such suicide shall be punished with imprisonment for a term which may extend to 10 years, and shall also be liable to fine. Suicide decriminalised On 6 May 2019, the Criminal Law Reform Act was passed; the Act includes the decriminalisation of suicide. It took effect on 1 January 2020.	
South Korea	Legal	Illegal	Illegal	See also: Suicide in South Korea Article 252 (Murder upon Request or with Consent) CRIMINAL ACT 53 (1) A person who kills another upon ones request or with ones consent shall be punished by imprisonment for not less than one year nor more than ten years.	
Sri Lanka	Legal	Illegal	Illegal	299. Abetment of suicide; If any person commits suicide, whoever abets the commission of such suicide shall be punished with death.	
Syria	Unknown	Unknown	Unknown	Unknown	
Taiwan	Legal	Illegal	Illegal	Article 275 (1) A person who causes the death of another person upon his request or with his consent shall be sentenced to imprisonment for not less than one year but not more than seven years. (2) A person who abets or aids another person in committing suicide shall be sentenced to imprisonment for not more than five years. (3) An attempt to commit any of the offenses specified in the preceding two paragraphs is punishable. (4) If two or more persons agree to kill themselves together and commit an offense specified in the preceding three paragraphs, the punishment may be remitted.	
Tajikistan	Legal	Illegal	Illegal	Article 109. Driving to Suicide (1) Driving an individual to suicide or attempt upon suicide by threat, cruel treatment, or systematic degrading the dignity of a victim is punishable by imprisonment for a period of 3 to 5 years. (2) The same actions committed in regard to a person, who was in financial or other dependence of the guilty person, or committed in regard to a minor is punishable by imprisonment for a period of 5 to 8 years.	
Thailand	Legal	Illegal	Illegal	Section 292 Whoever, practicing the cruelty or employing the similar factor on the person to have depended on him for subsistence or any other activities so as to that person shall commit the suicide, if suicide to have occurred or to have been attempted, shall be imprisoned not out seven years and fined not out of fourteen thousand Baht. Section 293 Whoever aids or instigates a child not over sixteen years of age, or a person who is unable to understand the nature and importance of his act or who is unable to control his act, to commit suicide, shall, if suicide has occurred or has been attempted, be punished with imprisonment not exceeding five years or fined not exceeding ten thousand Baht, or both.	
Turkmenistan	Unknown	Unknown	Unknown	Unknown	
United Arab Emirates	Illegal	Illegal	Illegal	Article 335: 1. Whoever instigates or helps in any way other person to suicide, and the other person starts or commits suicide based on such instigation or help, shall be subject to the punishment of incarceration. Should the suiciding person is under 18 years of age or of a limited mental capacity, this shall constitute an aggravating circumstance. The instigator shall be sentenced to the punishment prescribed for mediated murder or attempted murder, as applicable, in case the suiciding person or attempting suicide lacks mental capacity.	
Uzbekistan	Legal	Illegal	Illegal	Article 103. Bringing to Suicide Bringing to suicide or attempt thereat by cruel treatment or persistent degrading of honor and dignity of a person, who was not in financial or other dependence on a guilty person shall be punished with correctional labor up to three years or imprisonment up to five years. The same acts committed in respect of a person, who was in financial or other dependence on a guilty person shall be punished with correctional labor up to three years or imprisonment up to five years.	
Vietnam	Legal	Illegal	Illegal	Article 130. Coercing suicide: 1. Any person who cruelly treats, constantly intimidates, illtreats or humiliates a person dependent on him/her, inducing the latter to commit suicide, shall be sentenced to between two and seven years of imprisonment. 2. Any person who commits the crime of compelling more than one person to commit suicide shall be sentenced to between five and twelve years of imprisonment.; Article 131. Inciting or assisting another person to commit suicide: 1. Any person who incites another person to commit suicide or assists another person to commit suicide shall be sentenced to imprisonment for between six months and three years. 2. Any person who commits the crime of assisting or inciting more than one person to commit suicide shall be sentenced to between two and seven years of imprisonment.	
Yemen	Illegal	Illegal	Illegal	Unknown	

=== Europe ===
Country/region	Legality			Penalty	Notes
Country/region	Suicide	Physician-assisted suicide	Voluntary euthanasia	Penalty	Notes
Albania	Legal	Illegal	Illegal	Article 99 Causing suicide Causing suicide or a suicide attempt by a person because of the systematic maltreatment or other systematic misbehaviors which seriously affect the dignity [of the person], committed by another person under whose material dependence or any other dependence the former person is subject, is punishable by a fine or up to five years of imprisonment.	
Armenia	Legal	Illegal	Illegal	Article 110. Causing somebody to commit suicide.: 1. Causing somebody to commit suicide or make an attempt at a suicide by indirect willfulness or by negligence, by means of threat, cruel treatment or regular humiliation of one's dignity, is punished with imprisonment for the term of up to 3 years.; 2. The same act committed in relation to a person in financial or other dependence of the perpetrator, is punished with imprisonment for the term of up to 5 years.; Article 111. Abetment of suicide. Abetment of suicide, creation of determination in the person to commit suicide by means of instructions, deception, etc., if the person committed suicide or made a suicide attempt, is punished with imprisonment for the term of up to 3 years.	
Austria	Legal	Legal	Illegal	Killing a person on request by such person, or aiding or helping another person to commit suicide is punished with imprisonment of 6 months up to 5 years.	
Azerbaijan	Legal	Illegal	Illegal	Article 125. Bringing to suicide Bringing a person, who is taking place in material, service or other dependence from guilty, to suicide or to attempt at suicide by threats, cruel treatment or regular humiliation of his dignity – shall be punished by restriction of freedom for the term up to three years or imprisonment for the term from three up to seven years.	
Belarus	Legal	Illegal	Illegal	Article 105. Bringing to Suicide Bringing to suicide or to an attempted suicide through brutal treatment of the sufferer or systematic humiliation of his personal dignity - shall be punishable with the deprivation of freedom for a term of up to three years. The same action committed in relation to a person who has been materially or otherwise dependent on the culprit – shall be punishable with the deprivation of freedom for a term of up to five years.	
Belgium	Legal	Legal	Legal	See also: Euthanasia in Belgium	
Bosnia and Herzegovina	Legal	Illegal	Illegal	Unknown	
Bulgaria	Legal	Illegal	Illegal	Art. 127.: (1) Who, in any way whatsoever, helps or prevails upon a suicide and suicide or attempted suicide takes place, shall be punished by imprisonment of up to three years.; (2) For the same crime regarding a minor person or a person of whom the culprit is aware that he is in no position to guide his ac ts or he does not understand the quality or the importance of the act the punishment shall be imprisonment of three to ten years.; (3) Who, by a cruel treatment or systematic humiliation of the dignity of a person in material or other dependence on him leads him to a suicide or suicide attempt, having expected it, shall be punished by imprisonment of two to eight years.; (4) If the act under the preceding para is committed by negligence the punishment shall be imprisonment of up to three years.	
Croatia	Legal	Illegal	Illegal	Article 96 Participating in Suicide: (1) Whoever induces or assists another in committing suicide which is accomplished or attempted shall be punished by imprisonment for six months to five years.; (2) Whoever induces or assists a juvenile person in committing suicide, or induces or assists in committing suicide a person whose capability of understanding his own acts and of controlling his own will is significantly diminished, and the suicide is accomplished or attempted shall be punished by imprisonment for one to eight years.; (3) Whoever induces or assists a child in committing suicide or whoever induces or assists a person who is not capable of understanding the significance of his act, or could not control his own will so that the suicide is attempted or accomplished, shall be punished pursuant to Article 90 of this Code.; (4) Whoever treats a person who is in a state of subordination or dependence in a cruel or inhuman way and thereby negligently causes the suicide of that person shall be punished by imprisonment for three months to three years.	
Cyprus	Legal	Illegal	Illegal	214. Attempt to murder.; Any person who –: (a) attempts unlawfully to cause the death of another; or; (b) with intent unlawfully to cause the death of another does any act, or omits to do any act which it is his duty to do, such act or omission being of such a nature as to be likely to endanger human life, is guilty of a felony, and is liable to imprisonment for life.: 288. Abetting suicide.; Any person who—: (a) procures another to kill himself; or; (b) counsels another to kill himself and thereby induces him to do so; or; (c) aids another in killing himself, is guilty of a felony, and is liable to imprisonment for life.	
Czech Republic	Legal	Illegal	Illegal	Section 144 Accessory to Suicide: (1) Whoever encourages another person to commit suicide or assists another person in committing suicide, shall be sentenced, if at least an attempted suicide occurred, to imprisonment for up to three years.; (2) An offender shall be sentenced of imprisonment for two to eight years, if he/she commits the act referred to in Subsection (1) on a child or a pregnant woman.; (3) An offender shall be sentenced of imprisonment for five to twelve years, if he/she commits the act referred to in Subsection (1) on a child under fifteen years of age or on a person suffering from a mental disorder.	
Denmark	Legal	Illegal	Illegal	§ 240 Any person who assists another person in committing suicide shall be liable to a fine or to imprisonment for any term not exceeding three years.	
Estonia	Legal	Illegal	Illegal		
Finland	Legal	Illegal	Illegal	Unknown	
France	Legal	Illegal	Illegal	Unknown	
Georgia	Legal	Illegal	Illegal	A suicide attempt is punished by a fine of 500 lari. Article 115 – Incitement to suicide Incitement to suicide or attempted suicide accompanied with intimidation or cruel treatment of the victim or by degrading of the victim's honour or dignity, – shall be punished by restriction of liberty for up to three years or by imprisonment for a term of two to four years.	
Germany	Legal	Legal	Illegal		
Gibraltar	Legal	Illegal	Illegal	158. Suicide pacts.; (1) A person who, in pursuance of a suicide pact between him and another person–; (a) kills that person; or; (b) is party to the killing of that person by a third person, commits the offence of manslaughter and not murder.; (2) If it is shown that a person charged with the murder of another killed the other or was a party to his being killed, it is for the defence to prove that the person charged was acting in pursuance of a suicide pact between him and the other.; (3) For the purposes of this section, "suicide pact" means a common agreement between two or more persons having for its object the death of all of them, whether or not each is to take his own life, but nothing done by a person who enters into a suicide pact is to be treated as done by him in pursuance of the pact unless it is done while he has the settled intention of dying in pursuance of the pact.; 159. Complicity in suicide.; (1) A person ('D') commits an offence if–; (a) D does an act capable of encouraging or assisting the suicide or attempted suicide of another person; and; (b) D's act was intended to encourage or assist suicide or an attempt at suicide.; (2) The person referred to in subsection (1)(a) need not be a specific person (or class of persons) known to, or identified by, D.; (3) D may commit an offence under this section whether or not a suicide, or an attempt at suicide, occurs.; (4) A person who commits an offence under this section is liable on conviction on indictment to imprisonment for 14 years.; (5) If on the trial of an indictment for murder or manslaughter of a person it is proved that the deceased person committed suicide, and the defendant committed an offence under subsection (1) in relation to that suicide, the jury may find the defendant guilty of the offence under subsection (1).; (6) If D arranges for a person ('D2') to do an act that is capable of encouraging or assisting the suicide or attempted suicide of another person and D2 does that act, D is to be treated for the purposes of this Part as having done it.; (7) If the facts are such that an act is not capable of encouraging or assisting suicide or attempted suicide, for the purposes of this section it is to be treated as so capable if the act would have been so capable had the facts been as D believed them to be at the time of the act; or had subsequent events happened in the manner D believed they would happen, or both.; (8) A reference in this section to a person doing an act that is capable of encouraging the suicide or attempted suicide of another person includes a reference to his doing so by threatening another person or otherwise putting pressure on another person to commit or attempt suicide.; (9) A reference in this section to an act includes a reference to a course of conduct, and a reference to doing an act is to be read accordingly.; (10) No prosecution for an offence against this section may be commenced except by, or with the consent of, the Attorney General.	
Greece	Legal	Illegal	Illegal	Unknown	
Hungary	Legal	Illegal	Illegal	Section 162: (1) Any person who persuades another to commit suicide, or provides aid for suicide is guilty of a felony punishable by imprisonment between one to five years, if the suicide is attempted or committed.; (2) Any person over the age of eighteen years who persuades another person under the age of eighteen years to commit suicide, or provides aid for committing suicide is punishable by imprisonment between two to eight years, if the suicide is attempted or committed.	
Iceland	Legal	Illegal	Illegal	Art. 214 In case a person be conducive to another person's committing suicide he/she shall be subject to [imprisonment for up to 1 year] or fines. In case this be done for a selfish purpose the penalty shall be imprisonment for up to 3 years.	
Ireland	Legal	Illegal	Illegal	Unknown	
Italy	Legal	Illegal	Illegal	Unknown	
Kosovo	Legal	Illegal	Illegal	Article 183 Inciting suicide and assisting in suicide: 1. Whoever incites or assists another person to commit suicide, and the suicide is committed, shall be punished by imprisonment of one (1) to five (5) years.; 2. Whoever commits the offense provided for in paragraph 1 of this Article against a minor or a person whose capability to understand the gravity of his or her act or whose ability to control his or her behavior was substantially diminished, shall be punished by imprisonment of one (1) to ten (10) years.; 3. Whoever commits the offense provided for in paragraph 1 of this Article against a person under the age of fourteen (14) years or against a person who was incapable of understanding the gravity of his or her act or controlling his or her behavior shall be punished in accordance with Article 178 of this Code.; 4. Whoever treats another person in a subordinate position in a cruel or inhumane way and thereby causes such person to commit suicide shall be punished by imprisonment of six (6) months to five (5) years. For the purpose of this paragraph "person in a subordinate position" means a person who is under the supervision, rank, control or custody of the person who acted in a cruel or inhumane way.; 5. If, as a result of an offense provided for in paragraphs 1 to 4 of this Article, suicide has only been attempted, the punishment may be reduced.	
Latvia	Legal	Illegal	Illegal	Section 124. Causing a Suicide to be Committed: (1) For a person who commits causing a person to commit suicide or attempt suicide by cruel treatment of the victim or systematic demeaning of his or her personal dignity, if such person has not been in financial or other dependence upon the offender, the applicable sentence is deprivation of liberty for a term not exceeding three years.; (2) For a person who commits the same acts with regard to a person who has been in financial or other dependence upon the offender, the applicable sentence is deprivation of liberty for a term not exceeding five years.	
Liechtenstein	Legal	Illegal	Illegal	Killing somebody on request, or aiding somebody to commit suicide is punishable with imprisonment from six months up to five years.	
Lithuania	Legal	Illegal	Illegal	Article 133. Incitement of suicide or leading a person to suicide. Who has incited a person to kill themselves or in a cruel or treacherous way lead a person to suicide, is punished by restriction of liberty or arrest, or imprisonment of up to four years.	
Luxembourg	Legal	Legal	Legal		
Malta	Legal	Illegal	Illegal	213. Whosoever shall prevail on any person to commit suicide or shall give him any assistance, shall, if the suicide takes place, be liable, on conviction, to imprisonment for a term not exceeding twelve years.	
Moldova	Legal	Illegal	Illegal	Unknown	
Montenegro	Legal	Illegal	Illegal	Article 149 Incitement to suicide and aid in the commission of suicide: (1) Anyone who incites other person to suicide or aid him in committing suicide, and should suicide be committed or attempted, shall be sentenced to one to eight years of imprisonment.; (2) Anyone who aids other person in committing suicide subject to conditions referred to in Article 147 of the present Code, and should suicide be committed or attempted, shall be sentenced to three months to five years of imprisonment.; (3) Anyone who commits the act referred to in Paragraph 1 of this Article against a juvenile or a person in the state of substantialy diminished mental capacity, shall be sentenced to two to ten years of imprisonment.; (4) Should the act referred to in Paragraph 1 of this Article be committed against a child or a mentally incapable person, the perpetrator shall be sentenced in line with provisions of Article 144 of the present Code.; (5) Anyone who treats with cruelty or brutality other person subordinate or dependant on him, and should the person in question due to such treatment, commit or attempt suicide that can be attributed to the offender's negligence, shall be sentenced to six months to five years of impris	
Netherlands	Legal	Legal	Legal	See also: Euthanasia in the Netherlands	
North Macedonia	Legal	Illegal	Illegal	Article 128 Instigation to suicide and helping in suicide: (1) A person who instigates another to suicide or helps him in committing suicide, and this was committed, shall be punished with imprisonment of three months to three years.; (2) If the crime from item 1 is committed against a juvenile who reached the age of fourteen or against a person who is in a state of decreased mental competence, the offender shall be punished with imprisonment of one to ten years.; (3) If the crime from item 1 is committed against a juvenile who has not reached the age of fourteen years yet, or against a mentally incompetent person, the offender shall be punished according to article 123. `(4) A person behaving cruelly or inhumanely towards another who has a subordinate or dependent relationship to him, and if this person commits suicide because of this relationship, which could be attributed to negligence by the offender, shall be punished with imprisonment of six months to five years.; (5) If because of the crimes from items 1 to 4 the suicide was only attempted, the court may punish the offender more leniently.	
Norway	Legal	Illegal	Illegal	Assisted suicide is considered murder. In the Norwegian Penal Code, this falls under § 275, which states that anyone who kills another person is punished with imprisonment for 8–21 years. In § 276 Consent from the victim: If someone with their own consent is killed or causes significant damage to their body or health, the punishment for the convicted can be set below the minimum sentence or to a milder type of punishment than that which follows from § 275. In § 277 Complicity in suicide and in self-inflicted significant damage to body or health: Anyone who contributes to someone taking their own life is punished with imprisonment for 8–21 years, which follows from § 275.	
Poland	Legal	Illegal	Illegal	Articles 150. and 151. Art. 150.: § 1. Whoever kills a human on his own request and driven by compassion towards him shall be subject to the penalty of imprisonment for a term of between 3 months and 5 years.; § 2. In special cases the court may impose an extraordinary mitigation of punishment or even forego the punishment.; Art. 151. Whoever by encouraging or help drives a human to a suicide shall be subject to the penalty of imprisonment for a term of between 3 months and 5 years.	
Portugal	Legal	Legal	Illegal	Article 134 and 135 Article 134. Homicide requested by the victim: §1 Whoever ceases the live of another determined by a serious, instant and express request by the victim shall be punished with imprisonment for no more than 3 years.; §2 An attempt is punishable.; Article 135. Assisted suicide, Incitement to suicide: §1 Whoever incites another person to commit suicide or renders assistance for such purpose, shall be punished with sentence of imprisonment for not more than three years, if the suicide is effectively attempted or consummated.; §2 If the incited person or to whom assistance is rendered is less than 16 years of age or has, by any reason, his capability of evaluation or determination sensibly reduced, the agent of the crime is punished with sentence of imprisonment from one (1) to five (5) years.	
Romania	Legal	Illegal	Illegal	Article 191. Determining or facilitating suicide: (1). An act of determining or facilitating the suicide of an individual, if the suicide has taken place, shall be punishable by no less than 3 and no more than 7 years of imprisonment.; (2). When the act specified by par. (1) was committed against a juvenile between 13 and 18 years of age or against a person having a reduced competence, the penalty shall be no less than 5 and no more than 10 years of imprisonment.; (3). Determining or facilitating the suicide of an underage person who did not reach the age of 13 or of a person who was unable to realize the consequences of their actions or inactions or to control them, if suicide has taken place, shall be punishable by no less than 10 and no more than 20 years of imprisonment and a ban on the exercise of certain rights.; (4). If actions of determining or facilitating suicide set under par. (1) – (3) were followed by a suicide attempt, the special limits of the penalty shall be reduced down to half.	
Russia	Legal	Illegal	Illegal	Article 110. Incitement to Suicide Incitement of a person to commit or attempt to commit suicide by means of threats, cruel treatment of a person, or systematic denigration of the human dignity of the victim shall be punishable by restraint of liberty for a term of up to three years or by deprivation of liberty for a term of up to five years.	
Serbia	Legal	Illegal	Illegal	Article 119 Incitement to Suicide and Aiding in Suicide: (1) Whoever incites another to suicide or aids in committing suicide and this is committed or attempted, shall be punished with imprisonment of from six months to five years.; (2) Whoever assists another in committing suicide under provisions of Article 117 hereof, and this is committed or attempted, shall be punished with imprisonment from three months to three years.; (3) Whoever commits the act specified in paragraph 1 of this Article against a juvenile or person in a state of substantially diminished mental capacity, shall be punished with imprisonment from two to ten years.; (4) If the act specified in paragraph 1 of this Article is committed against a child or mentally incompetent person, the offender shall be punished in accordance with Article 114 hereof.; (5) Whoever cruelly or inhumanely treats another who is in a position of subordination or dependency and due to such treatment the person commits or attempts suicide that may be attributed to negligence of the perpetrator, shall be punished with imprisonment from six months to five years.	
Slovakia	Legal	Illegal	Illegal	Section 154 Participating in a Suicide: (1) Any person who incites another person to committing suicide, or helps him to commit suicide, shall, if at least a suicide attempt takes place, be liable to a term of imprisonment of between six months and three years.; (2) The offender shall be liable to a term of imprisonment of three to eight years if he commits the offence referred to in paragraph 1 a) acting in a more serious manner, b) against a protected person, or c) by reason of specific motivation.	
Slovenia	Legal	Illegal	Illegal	Article 120 Solicitation to and Assistance in Suicide: (1) Whoever intentionally solicits another person to kill himself or assists him in doing so, resulting in that person indeed committing suicide, shall be sentenced to imprisonment for not less than six months and not more than five years.; (2) Whoever commits the offence under the preceding paragraph against a minor above fourteen years of age or against a person whose ability to understand the meaning of his act or to control his conduct was substantially diminished shall be sentenced to imprisonment for not less than one and not more than ten years.; (3) In the event of the offence under paragraph 1 of this Article being committed against a minor under fourteen years of age or against a person who was not capable of understanding the meaning of his act or of controlling his conduct shall be punished according to the prescription for murder.; (4) Whoever treats his subordinate or a person depending on him in a cruel or inhumane manner, resulting in this person's suicide, shall be sent enced to imprisonment for not less than six months and not more than five years.; (5) Whoever, under particularly mitigating circumstances, assists another person to commit suicide, and if that person indeed commits suicide, shall be sentenced to imprisonment for not more than three years.; (6) If, relating to a criminal offence under the above paragraphs, the suicide has only been attempted, the Court may reduce the punishment of the perpetrator.	
Spain	Legal	Legal	Legal	Article 143: 1. Whoever induces another to suicide shall be punished with a sentence of imprisonment from four to eight years.; 2. A sentence of imprisonment of two to five years shall be imposed on whoever co-operates in the necessary acts for a person to commit suicide.; 3. Punishment shall involve a sentence of imprisonment from six to ten years if such co-operation were to reach the point of death ensuing.; 4. Whoever causes or actively co-operates in the necessary, direct acts causing the death of another, at the specific, serious, unequivocal request of that person, in the event of the victim suffering a serious disease that would unavoidably lead to death, or that causes permanent suffering that is hard to bear, shall be punished with a punishment lower by one or two degrees to those described in Sections 2 and 3 of this Article.	
Sweden	Legal	Illegal	Illegal	Penal Code, Chapter 3 § 1 Murder A person who takes the life of another shall be sentenced for murder to imprisonment for a fixed period of at least ten and at most eighteen years, or, if there are aggravating circumstances, for life.	
Switzerland	Legal	Legal	Illegal	See also: Suicide in Switzerland and Euthanasia in Switzerland	
Turkey	Legal	Illegal	Illegal	Article 84 Suicide: (1) Any person who solicits, encourages a person to commit suicide, or supports the decision of a person for suicide or helps the suicide action in any manner whatsoever, is punished with imprisonment from two years to five years.; (2) In case of commission of suicide, the person who is involved in such act is sentenced to imprisonment from four years to ten years.; (3) Any person who openly encourages others to commit suicide is punished with imprisonment from three years to eight years.; (5) Persons who encourage others, lack of ability to understand the meaning and consequences of the executed act, to commit suicide, or force a person to commit suicide under threat, are convicted of felonious homicide.	
Ukraine	Legal	Illegal	Illegal	Unknown	
United Kingdom	Legal	Illegal	Illegal	See also: Suicide in the United Kingdom and Euthanasia in the United Kingdom Criminal liability for complicity in another's suicide.: (1) A person ("D") commits an offence if—; (a) D does an act capable of encouraging or assisting the suicide or attempted suicide of another person, and; (b) D's act was intended to encourage or assist suicide or an attempt at suicide.; (1A) The person referred to in subsection (1)(a) need not be a specific person (or class of persons) known to, or identified by, D.; (1B) D may commit an offence under this section whether or not a suicide, or an attempt at suicide, occurs.; (1C) An offence under this section is triable on indictment and a person convicted of such an offence is liable to imprisonment for a term not exceeding 14 years.; (2) If on the trial of an indictment for murder or manslaughter of a person it is proved that the deceased person committed suicide, and the accused committed an offence under subsection (1) in relation to that suicide, the jury may find the accused guilty of the offence under subsection (1). (3) The enactments mentioned in the first column of the First Schedule to this Act shall have effect subject to the amendments provided for in the second column (which preserve in relation to offences under this section the previous operation of those enactments in relation to murder or manslaughter).; (4). [...] no proceedings shall be instituted for an offence under this section except by or with the consent of the Director of Public Prosecutions.	

=== Oceania ===
Country/region	Legality			Penalty	Notes
Country/region	Suicide	Physician-assisted suicide	Voluntary euthanasia	Penalty	Notes
American Samoa	Legal	Illegal	Illegal	46.3506 Promoting suicide. (a) A person is guilty of promoting suicide when he intentionally causes or aids another person to attempt suicide, or when he intentionally aids another person to commit suicide. (b) Promoting suicide is a class D felony.	
Australia	Legal	Legal	Legal	See also: Suicide in Australia and Euthanasia and assisted suicide in Australia	
Fiji	Legal	Illegal	Illegal	199. (1) Any person who of malice aforethought causes the death of another person by an unlawful act or omission is guilty of murder: Provided that it shall be manslaughter, and shall not be murder, for a person acting in pursuance of a suicide pact between him and another to kill the other. (2) Where it is shown that a person charged with the murder of another killed the other, it shall be for the defence to prove that the person charged was acting in pursuance of a suicide pact between him and the other. (3) For the purposes of this section "suicide pact" means a common agreement between two or more persons having for its object the death of all of them, whether or not each is to take his own life, but nothing done by a person who enters into a suicide pact shall be treated as done by him in pursuance of the pact unless it is done while he has the settled intention of dying in pursuance of the pact.	
Guam	Legal	Illegal	Illegal	Unknown	
New Zealand	Legal	Legal	Legal	See also: Euthanasia and assisted suicide in New Zealand, End of Life Choice Act 2019, and 2020 New Zealand euthanasia referendum	
Northern Mariana Islands	Legal	Illegal	Illegal	Unknown	
Palau	Legal	Illegal	Illegal	Unknown	
Papua New Guinea	Illegal	Illegal	Illegal	310. AIDING SUICIDE.; A person who– (a) procures another to kill himself; or (b) counsels another to kill himself and so induces him to do so; or (c) aids another in killing himself, is guilty of a crime. Penalty: Subject to Section 19, imprisonment for life.: 311. ATTEMPTING TO COMMIT SUICIDE.; A person who attempts to kill himself is guilty of a misdemeanour. Penalty: Imprisonment for a term not exceeding one year.	
Samoa	Unknown	Unknown	Unknown	Unknown	
Solomon Islands	Unknown	Unknown	Unknown	Unknown	
Tokelau	Unknown	Unknown	Unknown	9. Counselling Suicide; Any person who counsels or procures a person to commit suicide, or aids or abets a person in the commission of suicide commits an offence. (Penalty "not exceeding more than $150 fine or 3 months imprisonment")	
Tonga	Unknown	Unknown	Unknown	Unknown	
Tuvalu	Unknown	Unknown	Unknown	Unknown	
Vanuatu	Unknown	Unknown	Unknown	Unknown	

== Laws of individual jurisdictions ==
=== Australia ===
==== Summary of laws ====
Jurisdiction	Name	Laws passed	Commencement date
Victoria	Voluntary Assisted Dying Act 2017	29 November 2017	19 June 2019
Western Australia	Voluntary Assisted Dying Act 2019	19 December 2019	1 July 2021
Tasmania	End-of-Life Choices (Voluntary Assisted Dying) Act 2021	4 March 2021	23 October 2022
Queensland	Voluntary Assisted Dying Act 2021	16 September 2021	1 January 2023
South Australia	Voluntary Assisted Dying Act 2021	23 June 2021	31 January 2023
New South Wales	Voluntary Assisted Dying Act 2022	19 May 2022	28 November 2023
Australian Capital Territory	Voluntary Assisted Dying Act 2024	5 June 2024	3 November 2025
Northern Territory	Rights of the Terminally Ill Act 2026	27 August 2026	Early 2028

==== Nullified law ====
Jurisdiction	Laws passed	Commencement date	Nullified
Northern Territory	25 May 1995	1 July 1996	27 June 1997

==== Australian Capital Territory ====
Australian Capital Territory (ACT) governments had regularly advocated for the right to legalise euthanasia-related schemes between 1997 and 2022, when the federal ban was in practice. Shortly after the federal ban was repealed, the ACT government confirmed it would seek to introduce legislation into the ACT Legislative Assembly in 2023 to permit voluntary assisted dying. A formal consultation period was opened by the government in February 2023, which culminated in a report endorsing the establishment of a voluntary assisted dying scheme, published on 29 June 2023. On 31 October 2023, the Voluntary Assisted Dying Bill 2023 was introduced into the Legislative Assembly. Under the legislation, a person would be eligible for voluntary assisted dying if they are aged over 18, seeking it voluntarily with decision-making capability, intolerably suffering an advanced-progressive condition expected to cause death, and lives local to the ACT for at least 12 months or with a significant Canberra connection. The bill was referred to a select committee for further consultation, which reported back on 29 February 2024. The committee recommended several alterations to the bill including clarifying terms such as 'advanced' and 'last stages of life'. Liberals committee members Leanne Castley and Ed Cocks recommended that the bill not be passed, describing it as "the most ideological and extreme assisted dying legislation in the country", while Greens member Andrew Braddock supported the bill and recommended it be expanded to include people with dementia who had lost individual decision-making capacity.

The legislation returned for debate in the Assembly and was passed by the chamber on 5 June 2024, with 20 votes in favour and five against. Under the finalised legislation, people will become eligible to begin the process of accessing the scheme if they are at least 18 years old and seeking voluntary assisted dying voluntarily with decision-making capability. Further, they will have to show that they are intolerably suffering an advanced, progressive condition expected to cause death and that they have been local to the ACT for at least 12 months, or have a significant Canberra connection. The individual then accesses a "multi-step request and assessment process", requiring independent assessment by two qualified health professionals. The scheme differs from the tenets of other state-based schemes, namely; patients do not need to have a specific time frame until they are expected to die, one of the two health practitioners who assess someone's eligibility may be a nurse practitioner, and patients who receive treatment in institutions (such as hospitals) that object to voluntary assisted dying will have a greater ability to access it than in the states. The legislation was notified on 19 June 2024 and went into effect on 3 November 2025.

Voluntary Assisted Dying Bill 2023 – Third Reading
Party	Votes for	Votes against
Labor (10)	10: Andrew Barr; Yvette Berry; Joy Burch; Tara Cheyne; Mick Gentleman; Suzanne Orr; Marisa Paterson; Michael Pettersson; Chris Steel; Rachel Stephen-Smith	–
Liberal (9)	4: Leanne Castley; Nicole Lawder; Elizabeth Lee; Mark Parton	5: Peter Cain; Ed Cocks; Jeremy Hanson; James Milligan; Elizabeth Kikkert
Greens (6)	6: Andrew Braddock; Jo Clay; Emma Davidson; Laura Nuttall; Shane Rattenbury; Rebecca Vassarotti	–
Total (25)	20	5

==== New South Wales ====
On 21 September 2017 National Party MLC Trevor Khan introduced the Voluntary Assisted Dying Bill 2017 into the New South Wales Parliament. The bill was modelled on the Oregon Death With Dignity Act, and was developed by a cross party working group that considered 72 "substantial" submissions. The bill contained what advocates labelled a "raft of safeguards" including a seven-person oversight board to review all assisted deaths. The upper house debated the bill throughout several sittings in November 2017, and on 16 November the bill was voted down 20 votes to 19.

In October 2021 independent MLA Alex Greenwich introduced the Voluntary Assisted Dying Bill into the lower house of the Parliament. The legislation was subjected to a cross-party conscience vote, after Premier and Liberal Party leader Dominic Perrottet indicated he would grant Liberal members a conscience vote. The legislation was passed in the Legislative Assembly on 26 November 2021 by 52 votes to 32, and proceeded to the Legislative Council. The bill passed the Legislative Council by 23 votes to 15 on 19 May 2022, with amendments attached, that were agreed to by the Assembly that same day. The legislation received royal assent on 27 May 2022, and went into effect 18 months thereafter (i.e: 28 November 2023). New South Wales was the last of the six Australian states to legislate assisted dying.

Under the provisions of the legislation, a person may request a voluntary assisted death from a specialist doctor, which is lodged with the Voluntary Assisted Dying Board. If the doctor is satisfied that the person has the capacity to make the decision and is doing so voluntarily and determines that the person meets the criteria (i.e: they have a terminal illness that will result in death within six months, or a neurodegenerative condition that will result in death within 12 months, and whose suffering is such that it creates a painful condition that cannot be tolerably relieved), they can approve the request. The same process must then be followed by a second independent doctor. The person may then make a written request declaring their intention to end their life, which must be witnessed by two people and then be submitted to the board. A final request must be made five days later and a review done by the first doctor, who can then apply to the Voluntary Assisted Dying Board to allow access to a substance to end their patient's life. The person may administer the relevant substance themselves or have a health practitioner do it.

=== Northern Territory ===
Euthanasia was legalised in Australia's Northern Territory, by the Rights of the Terminally Ill Act 1995. It passed the Northern Territory Legislative Assembly by a vote of 15 to 10. In August 1996 a repeal bill was brought before the Parliament but was defeated by 14 votes to 11. The law was later voided by the federal Euthanasia Laws Act 1997, which is a federal law that was in effect until 13 December 2022 and prevented parliaments of territories (Specifically the Northern Territory, the Australian Capital Territory and Norfolk Island) from legalising euthanasia or assisted dying. Before the federal override occurred, three people died through physician assisted suicide under the legislation, aided by Dr Philip Nitschke. The first person was a carpenter, Bob Dent, who died on 22 September 1996.

Rights of the Terminally Ill Bill 1995 – Third Reading
Party	Votes for	Votes against
Country Liberal (17)	10: Loraine Braham; Barry Coulter; Fred Finch; Daryl Manzie; Phil Mitchell; Mick Palmer; Marshall Perron; Eric Poole; Mike Reed; Rick Setter	7: Peter Adamson; Tim Baldwin; Denis Burke; Stephen Hatton; Richard Lim; Terry McCarthy (Speaker); Shane Stone
Labor (7)	4: John Bailey; Brian Ede; Maggie Hickey; Wes Lanhupuy	3: Neil Bell; Maurice Rioli; Syd Stirling
Independent (1)	1: Noel Padgham-Purich	–
Total (25)	15	10

Following the repeal of the federal ban on territory-based euthanasia legislation, the Northern Territory Labor government announced the formation of a community consultation process "for developing a framework for voluntary assisted dying", submissions for which closed in May 2024. The process culminated in the release of a report by an independent expert advisory panel, co-chaired by the Hon Vicki O’Halloran AO CVO and Duncan McConnel SC, which recommended a voluntary assisted dying scheme be established in the Northern Territory. No legislation was brought to the parliament prior to the 2024 general election, at which the incumbent Labor government committed to tabling an assisted dying bill in the next parliament and the opposition Country Liberal Party (CLP) was noncommittal on the issue.

In May 2025 the CLP government tasked the Legislative Assembly's Legal and Constitutional Affairs Committee with inquiring into the aforementioned report and a potential assisted dying scheme in the Northern Territory. The committee issued its report in September 2025, and recommended that a voluntary assisted dying scheme similar to the Australian Capital Territory's scheme be implemented. Acting Chief Minister Gerard Maley subsequently confirmed the government would draft legislation to be introduced to the Legislative Assembly at a later date.

The Rights of the Terminally Ill Bill 2026 was introduced to the parliament on 23 July 2026. The legislation allows a terminally ill person with 12 months or less to live to access voluntary assisted dying, provided they initiate an initial request for information from a relevant doctor. Though the legislation was subject to a conscience vote, it was passed with the support of most CLP government lawmakers when the bill was debated in the assembly on 27 August 2026. However, the bill diverges from the recommendations by the parliamentary inquiry report. The report recommended there be no requirement for a prognosis time frame for a person to be eligible for voluntary assisted dying, though voluntary assisted dying can only be accessed by those with 12 months or less to live as part of the bill. The report also recommended against a so-called "gag clause" that bars doctors from initiating voluntary assisted dying discussions with patients, however, such a clause is in the bill. End-of-life law expert, Ben White, said the gag-clause risks depriving terminally ill people of choice. Access to voluntary assisted dying in the Northern Territory is not likely to be available until early 2028.

To be eligible to access voluntary assisted dying in the Northern Territory a person must be 18-years-old or older and have the capacity to make their own decisions about voluntary assisted dying. They must also be "suffering intolerably from a medical condition that is advanced, progressive and expected to cause death within 12 months". Two independent doctors with training on voluntary assisted dying will then assess the case and criteria, which is also overseen by a review board. Health professionals in the Northern Territory can conscientiously object to being involved in voluntary assisted dying but must give patients government-approved information about voluntary assisted dying if they ask about it. The law requires the person to have lived in the Northern Territory for at least 12 months before requesting voluntary assisted dying, with some exceptions.

==== Queensland ====
In November 2018, the Premier of Queensland, Annastacia Palaszczuk, launched an inquiry considering the possible legalisation of voluntary assisted dying in the state. The inquiry also took into account care of the aged, end of life, and palliative care.

In May 2021, Palaszczuk announced that voluntary assisted dying legislation would be introduced to the Queensland Parliament for consideration. The bill would allow euthanasia, if the patient meets the following criteria:

- Has an eligible condition that is advanced and progressive, with the potential for death within the subsequent 12 months;
- Is capable of making a decision with sound mind;
- Is acting voluntarily and without coercion;
- Is at least 18 years old; and
- Is a resident of Australia and has lived in Queensland for at least twelve months.

On 16 September 2021, the Queensland Legislative Assembly passed the Voluntary Assisted Dying Act 2021 with 61 votes in favour and 31 opposed. The legislation was subject to a conscience vote. It received royal assent on 23 September 2021 went into effect on 1 January 2023.

Voluntary Assisted Dying Bill 2021 – Third Reading
Party	Votes for	Votes against	Abstained/Absent
Labor (52)	48: Mark Bailey; Nikki Boyd; Jonty Bush; Glenn Butcher; Craig Crawford; Yvette D'Ath; Mick de Brenni; Cameron Dick; Leeanne Enoch; Di Farmer; Shannon Fentiman; Mark Furner; Julieanne Gilbert; Grace Grace; Aaron Harper; Michael Healy; Stirling Hinchliffe; Jennifer Howard; Jason Hunt; Ali King; Shane King; Brittany Lauga; Leanne Linard; Cynthia Lui; Jim Madden; James Martin; Lance McCallum; Melissa McMahon; Corrine McMillan; Steven Miles; Charis Mullen; Barry O'Rourke; Annastacia Palaszczuk; Jess Pugh; Kim Richards; Peter Russo; Mark Ryan; Bruce Saunders; Meaghan Scanlon; Robert Skelton; Tom Smith; Scott Stewart; Jimmy Sullivan; Adrian Tantari; Les Walker; Chris Whiting; Don Brown (teller); Joan Pease (teller)	3: Joe Kelly; Bart Mellish; Linus Power	1: Curtis Pitt (Speaker)
Liberal National (34)	10: Mark Boothman; Michael Crandon; Michael Hart; Dale Last; Brent Mickelberg; Steve Minnikin; Rob Molhoek; Tim Nicholls; Sam O'Connor; Ray Stevens	23: Ros Bates; Stephen Bennett; Jarrod Bleijie; Colin Boyce; Amanda Camm; David Crisafulli; Deb Frecklington; Laura Gerber; David Janetzki; Jon Krause; Ann Leahy; James Lister; Tim Mander; Jim McDonald; Lachlan Millar; Tony Perrett; Dan Purdie; Mark Robinson; Christian Rowan; Fiona Simpson; Pat Weir; Andrew Powell (teller); Trevor Watts (teller)	1: John-Paul Langbroek (Note: John-Paul Langbroek missed the vote because he was unable to enter the state of Queensland due to COVID-19 internal border closures.)
Katter's Australian (3)	–	3: Nick Dametto; Robbie Katter; Shane Knuth	–
Greens (2)	2: Michael Berkman; Amy MacMahon	–	–
One Nation (1)	–	1: Stephen Andrew	–
Independent (1)	1: Sandy Bolton	–	–
Total (93)	61	30	2

==== South Australia ====
In November 2016, the South Australian House of Assembly narrowly rejected a private member's bill which would have legalised a right to request voluntary euthanasia in circumstances where a person is in unbearable pain and suffering from a terminal illness. The bill was the first ever euthanasia bill to pass a second reading stage (27 votes to 19) though the bill was rejected during the clauses debate of the bill (23 votes all, with the Speaker's casting vote against the bill).

In late June 2021, a voluntary euthanasia bill similar to that of other states passed the Parliament of South Australia. The legislation mirrors most of the provisions of the Victorian law, though also allows private hospitals and individual practitioners to conscientiously object from participating in the scheme, provided they refer patients to a place where they can access the scheme. Residents in aged care and retirement villages can also access the scheme in their own homes or units. The Voluntary Assisted Dying Act 2021 went into effect on 31 January 2023.

Details of 2021 parliamentary votes on legalisation of assisted dying in South Australia

Voluntary Assisted Dying Bill 2021 Third Reading in the Legislative Council
Party	Votes for	Votes against
Liberal (8)	4: Jing Lee; Michelle Lensink; David Ridgway; Stephen Wade	4: Nicola Centofanti; Dennis Hood (teller); Rob Lucas; Terry Stephens
Labor (8)	6: Emily Bourke; Justin Hanson; Ian Hunter; Kyam Maher (teller); Irene Pnevmatikos; Russell Wortley	2: Tung Ngo; Clare Scriven
SA Best (2)	1: Connie Bonaros	1: Frank Pangallo
Greens (2)	2: Tammy Franks; Robert Simms	–
Advance SA (1)	1: John Darley	–
Total (22) (Note: President of the Council and independent MLC John Dawkins did not vote.)	14	7

Voluntary Assisted Dying Bill 2021 Third Reading in the House of Assembly
Party	Votes for	Votes against
Liberal (23)	15: David Basham; Vickie Chapman; Matt Cowdrey; John Gardner; Richard Harvey; Paula Luethen; Steven Marshall; Nick McBride; Stephen Patterson; David Pisoni; Carolyn Power; Rachel Sanderson; Peter Treloar; Tim Whetstone; Corey Wingard	7: Dan Cregan; Stephan Knoll; Steve Murray; Adrian Pederick (teller); David Speirs; Vincent Tarzia; Dan van Holst Pellekaan
Labor (19)	15: Zoe Bettison; Leon Bignell; Blair Boyer; Susan Close; Nat Cook; Jon Gee; Katrine Hildyard; Eddie Hughes; Peter Malinauskas; Stephen Mullighan; Lee Odenwalder; Chris Picton; Jayne Stinson; Joe Szakacs; Dana Wortley	3: Tom Koutsantonis; Andrea Michaels; Tony Piccolo
Independent (5)	3: Frances Bedford; Troy Bell; Fraser Ellis	1: Sam Duluk
Total (47) (Note: Geoff Brock (Independent) and Michael Brown (Labor) were paired and did not vote. Josh Teague (Liberal), the Speaker of the House of Assembly, did not vote.)	33	11

==== Tasmania ====
Tasmania came close to legalising voluntary euthanasia in November 2013, when a Greens-initiated voluntary euthanasia bill was narrowly defeated in the House of Assembly by a vote of 13–12. The bill would have allowed terminally ill Tasmanians to end their lives 10 days after making three separate requests to their doctor. Although both major parties allowed a conscience vote, all ten Liberals voted against the legislation, with Labor splitting seven in favour and three against, and all five Greens voting in favour.

In December 2019, independent Legislative Council member Mike Gaffney announced he would introduce a private member's bill to legalise voluntary assisted dying the following year. The End of Life Choices (Voluntary Assisted Dying) Bill was introduced to the Council on 27 August and was passed on 10 November 2020, without a formal vote being recorded. It proceeded to the Legislative Assembly, where it was passed with amendments attached on 4 March 2021 by 16 votes to 6. After the Council approved of the Assembly's amendments, the legislation received royal assent on 22 April 2021. The legislation went into effect on 23 October 2022.

Under the provisions of the legislation, in order to access the scheme a person must be at least 18 years of age, have decision-making capacity, be acting voluntarily and be suffering intolerably from a medical condition that is advanced, incurable, irreversible and will cause the person's death in the next six months, or 12 months for neurodegenerative disorders. The person must also be an Australian citizen or have resided in the country for at least three continuous years, and for at least 12 months in Tasmania immediately before making their first request. In total three separate requests must be made to access the scheme, each of which comes with progressively more stringent checks and balances.

End of Life Choices (Voluntary Assisted Dying) Bill 2021 – Third Reading in the House of Assembly
Party	Votes for	Votes against	Abstained/Absent
Liberal (13)	5: Sarah Courtney; Peter Gutwein; Roger Jaensch; Jeremy Rockliff; Nic Street	6: Elise Archer; Guy Barnett; Michael Ferguson; Jacquie Petrusma; John Tucker; Felix Ellis (teller)	2: Sue Hickey (Speaker); Mark Shelton
Labor (9)	8: Shane Broad; Jen Butler; Ella Haddad; David O'Byrne; Michelle O'Byrne; Alison Standen; Rebecca White; Anita Dow (teller)	–	1: Jennifer Houston
Greens (2)	2: Cassy O'Connor; Rosalie Woodruff	–	–
Independent (1)	1: Madeleine Ogilvie	–	–
Total (25)	16	6	3

=== Victoria ===
Since 19 June 2019, Victoria permits assisted dying. On 20 September 2017, the Voluntary Assisted Dying Bill 2017 was introduced into the Victorian Parliament by the Andrews Labor Government, permitting assisted suicide. The bill was modelled on the recommendations of an expert panel chaired by former Australian Medical Association president Professor Brian Owler. The bill passed the parliament, with amendments made in the Legislative Council, on 29 November 2017. The upper house voted in favour 22 votes to 18. The lower house voted in favour 47 votes to 37. In passing the bill, Victoria became the first state to legislate for voluntary assisted dying (VAD). The law received royal assent on 5 December 2017 and came into effect on 19 June 2019. Implementation of the legislation was an ongoing process which took approximately 18 months. Challenges identified with implementation which were by noted by the Medical Journal of Australia included restricting access to those who were eligible, while ensuring it did not unfairly prevent those who were eligible from accessing it and translating the legislation into appropriate clinical practice, as well as supporting and managing doctors with conscientious objections.

Under the provisions of the legislation, assisted suicide (otherwise referred to as voluntary assisted dying) may be available in Victoria under the following conditions:

- A person must be suffering from an incurable, advanced and progressive disease, illness or medical condition, and experiencing intolerable suffering.
- The condition must be assessed by two medical practitioners to be expected to cause death within six months (an exception exists for a person suffering from a neurodegenerative condition, where instead the condition must be expected to cause death within 12 months).
- A person must be over the age of 18 and have lived in Victoria for at least 12 months and have decision-making capacity.
- Though mental illness or disability are not grounds for access, people who meet all other criteria and who have a disability or mental illness will not be denied access to assisted dying.

Other processes and safeguards associated with the scheme are in place. In November 2025 the parliament passed legislation which expanded the eligibility timeframe for all terminal diagnoses from six to 12 months and removed the "gag clause" which forbade doctors from initiating conversations about voluntary assisted dying with patients.

Voluntary Assisted Dying Bill 2017 – Third Reading in Legislative Assembly
Party	Votes for	Votes against	Abstained/Absent
Labor (45)	38: Jacinta Allan; Daniel Andrews; Josh Bull; Ben Carroll; Christine Couzens; Lily D'Ambrosio; Steve Dimopoulos; Luke Donnellan; Paul Edbrooke; Maree Edwards; John Eren; Martin Foley; Jane Garrett; Judith Graley; Danielle Green; Bronwyn Halfpenny (teller); Jill Hennessy; Geoff Howard; Natalie Hutchins; Sonya Kilkenny; Sharon Knight; Telmo Languiller; Hong Lim; Frank McGuire; Lisa Neville; Wade Noonan; Martin Pakula; Tim Pallas; Danny Pearson; Jude Perera; Robin Scott; Ros Spence (teller); Nick Staikos; Mary-Anne Thomas; Marsha Thomson; Vicki Ward; Gabrielle Williams; Richard Wynne	6: Lizzie Blandthorn; Anthony Carbines; Marlene Kairouz; James Merlino; Tim Richardson; Natalie Suleyman	1: Colin Brooks (Speaker)
Liberal (30)	4: Roma Britnell; David Morris; Brian Paynter; Louise Staley	24: Neil Angus; Brad Battin; Gary Blackwood; Neale Burgess; Robert Clark; Martin Dixon; Christine Fyffe; Michael Gidley; Matthew Guy; David Hodgett; Andrew Katos (teller); Cindy McLeish; Michael O'Brien; John Pesutto; Richard Riordan; Dee Ryall; Ryan Smith; Tim Smith; David Southwick; Murray Thompson; Bill Tilley; Nick Wakeling; Graham Watt; Kim Wells	2: Louise Asher; Heidi Victoria
National (7)	1: Emma Kealy	6: Tim Bull; Peter Crisp (teller); Tim McCurdy; Danny O'Brien; Steph Ryan; Peter Walsh	–
Greens (2)	2: Sam Hibbins; Ellen Sandell	–	–
Independent (3)	2: Don Nardella; Suzanna Sheed	1: Russell Northe	–
Vacant (1)	–	–	1: Northcote (by-election)
Total (88)	47	37	4

Voluntary Assisted Dying Bill 2017 – Third Reading in Legislative Council
Party	Votes for	Votes against	Absent
Labor (14)	11: Philip Dalidakis; Khalil Eideh; Mark Gepp; Gavin Jennings; Shaun Leane; Cesar Melhem; Jenny Mikakos; Jaala Pulford; Harriet Shing; Jaclyn Symes; Gayle Tierney	3: Nazih Elasmar; Daniel Mulino; Adem Somyurek	–
Liberal (14)	4: Bruce Atkinson (President); Edward O'Donohue; Simon Ramsay; Mary Wooldridge	10: Georgie Crozier; Richard Dalla-Riva; David Davis; Bernie Finn (teller); Margaret Fitzherbert; Wendy Lovell; Josh Morris; Craig Ondarchie; Inga Peulich (teller); Gordon Rich-Phillips	–
National (2)	–	2: Melina Bath; Luke O'Sullivan	–
Greens (5)	5: Samantha Dunn; Colleen Hartland (teller); Sue Pennicuik; Samantha Ratnam; Nina Springle	–	–
Shooters (2)	–	2: Jeff Bourman; Daniel Young	–
Australian Conservatives (1)	–	1: Rachel Carling-Jenkins	–
Australian Sex Party (1)	1: Fiona Patten	–	–
Vote 1 Local Jobs (1)	1: James Purcell	–	–
Total (40)	22	18	0

==== Western Australia ====
In November 2018 the McGowan Government announced it would introduce an assisted dying bill early in the new year.

On 10 December 2019, the Voluntary Assisted Dying Act 2019 passed the Western Australian Parliament. The legislation had passed the Legislative Council by 24 votes to 11, having previously passed the Legislative Assembly 45 votes to 11. Under the legislation, an eligible person would have to be terminally ill with a condition that is causing intolerable suffering and is likely to cause death within six months, or 12 months for a neurodegenerative condition. The person would have to make two verbal requests and one written request, with each request signed off by two independent doctors. Self-administration of lethal medication is then permitted, though in a departure from the Victorian system, a patient can choose for a medical practitioner to administer the drug. The legislation goes into effect on a day to be fixed by proclamation, though the government has advised of an 18-month implementation period. The law went into effect on 1 July 2021.

==== Legislation decriminalizing suicide in Australian States and Territories ====
Jurisdiction	Legislation
Australian Capital Territory	Crimes Act 1900 (ACT) s 16
New South Wales	Crimes Act 1900 (NSW) s 31A
Northern Territory	Criminal Code (NT) s 186 (repealed)
Queensland	Criminal Code 1899 (Qld) s 312 (repealed by Criminal Law Amendment Act (1979) s 4)
South Australia	Criminal Law Consolidation Act 1932 (SA) s 13A
Tasmania	Criminal Code 1924 (Tas) s 163
Victoria	Crimes Act 1958 (Vic) s 6A
Western Australia	Criminal Code 1899 (WA) s 289 (repealed by Criminal Code Amendment Act 1972 s 10)

=== Canada ===
The common-law crimes of attempting suicide and of assisting suicide were codified in Canada when Parliament enacted the Criminal Code in 1892. It carried a maximum penalty of 2 years' imprisonment. Eighty years later, in 1972, Parliament repealed the offence of attempting suicide from the Criminal Code based on the argument that a legal deterrent was unnecessary. The prohibition on assisting suicide remained, as s 241 of the Criminal Code:

Counselling or aiding suicide
241. Every one who

(a) counsels a person to commit suicide, or

(b) aids or abets a person to commit suicide,

whether suicide ensues or not, is guilty of an indictable offence and liable to imprisonment for a term not exceeding fourteen years.

However, the law against assisted suicide, including physician-assisted suicide, was the subject of much debate including two reports of the Law Reform Commission of Canada in 1982 and 1983, though these did not support changing the law.

In 1993, the offence of assisted suicide survived a constitutional challenge in the Supreme Court of Canada, in the case of Rodriguez v. British Columbia (Attorney General). The plaintiff, Sue Rodriguez, had been diagnosed with amyotrophic lateral sclerosis (ALS) in early 1991. She wished to be able to die of suicide at a time of her own choosing but would require assistance to do so because her physical condition prevented her from doing so without assistance. By a 5-4 majority, the Court held that the prohibition on assisted suicide did not infringe s 7 of the Canadian Charter of RIghts and Freedoms, which provides constitutional protection for liberty and security of the person. The majority held that while the law did affect those rights, it did so in a manner consistent with the principles of fundamental justice. The majority also held that the prohibition on assisted suicide did not infringe the Charter's prohibition against cruel and unusual treatment or punishment. Assuming the prohibition did discriminate on basis of disability, the majority held that the infringement was a justifiable restriction under s 1 of the Canadian Charter of Rights and Freedoms.

In 1995 the Senate issued a report on assisted suicide entitled Of Life and Death. In 2011, the Royal Society of Canada published its report on end-of-life decision-making. In the report it recommended that the Criminal Code be modified so as to permit assistance in dying under some circumstances. In 2012, a Select Committee on Dying with Dignity of the Quebec National Assembly produced a report recommending amendments to legislation to recognize medical aid in dying as being an appropriate component of end-of-life care. That report resulted in An Act respecting end-of-life care, which came into force on December 10, 2015.

On June 15, 2012, in Carter v Canada (AG), the British Columbia Supreme Court ruled that the criminal offence prohibiting physician assistance of suicide was unconstitutional on the grounds that denying people access to assisted suicide in hard cases was contrary to the Charter of Rights and Freedoms guarantee of equality under Section 15. This decision was subsequently overturned by the majority of the British Columbia Court of Appeal (2:1) on the basis that the issue had already been decided by the Supreme Court of Canada in the Rodriguez case, invoking stare decisis.

A landmark Supreme Court of Canada decision on February 6, 2015 overturned the 1993 Rodriguez decision that had ruled against this method of dying. The unanimous decision in the further appeal of Carter v Canada (AG), stated that a total prohibition of physician-assisted death is unconstitutional. The court's ruling limits exculpation of physicians engaging physician-assisted death to hard cases of "a competent adult person who clearly consents to the termination of life and has a grievous and irremediable medical condition, including an illness, disease or disability, that causes enduring suffering that is intolerable to the individual in the circumstances of his or her condition." The ruling was suspended for 12 months to allow the Canadian parliament to draft a new, constitutional law to replace the existing one.

Specifically, the Supreme Court held that the current legislation was overbroad in that it prohibits "physician‑assisted death for a competent adult person who (1) clearly consents to the termination of life and (2) has a grievous and irremediable medical condition (including an illness, disease or disability) that causes enduring suffering that is intolerable to the individual in the circumstances of his or her condition." The court decision includes a requirement that there must be stringent limits that are "scrupulously monitored." This will require the death certificate to be completed by an independent medical examiner, not the treating physician, to ensure the accuracy of reporting the cause of death.

The federal government of 2015 subsequently requested a six-month extension for implementation; the arguments for this request were scheduled to be heard by the Supreme Court in January 2016.

The Canadian Medical Association (CMA) reported that not all doctors would be willing to help a patient die. The belief in late 2015 was that no physician would be forced to do so. The CMA was already offering educational sessions to members as to the process that would be used after the legislation had been implemented.

=== India ===
The Indian penal code 309 deals with punishment for attempted suicide. The Mental Health Care Act 2017 greatly limits the scope for the code to be implemented. The bill states, "Any person who attempts to commit suicide shall be presumed, unless proved otherwise, to have severe stress and shall not be tried and punished under the said Code". State governments are required to provide adequate care and rehabilitation for such individuals as to prevent a recurrence of an attempt to suicide.

=== Iran ===
The act of suicide has not been criminalized in the penal law of the Islamic Republic of Iran. However, no one is allowed to ask another to kill him/her. In addition, threatening to kill oneself is not an offense by the law, however if this act of threatening is done by a prisoner in a prison, then that would be considered as violation of the prisons' regulations and the offender may be punished according to penal law.

According to the Act. 836 of the civil law of the Islamic Republic of Iran if a suicidal person prepares for suicide and writes a testament, if he/she dies, then by law the will is considered void and if he/she does not die, then the will is officially accepted and can be carried out.

According to the theory of "borrowed crime", suicide itself is not a crime in penal law and thus any type of assistance in an individual's suicide is not considered a crime and the assistant is not punishable. Assisting in suicide is considered a crime only when it becomes the "cause" of the suicidal person's death; for example when someone takes advantage of someone else's unawareness or simplicity and convince him/her to kill him/herself. In such cases assisting in suicide is treated as murder and the offender is punishable accordingly. In addition, assisting in suicide is considered a crime under section 2 of the Act. 15 of the cyber crimes law of the Islamic Republic of Iran which was legislated on June 15, 2009. According to the mentioned act, any type of encouragement, stimulation, invitation, simplification of access to lethal substances and/or methods and teaching of suicide with the help of computer or any other media network is considered assisting in suicide and thus, is punishable by imprisonment from 91 days up to one year or fines from five to 20 million Iranian Rials or both.

=== Ireland ===
Attempted suicide is not a criminal offence in Ireland and, under Irish law, self-harm is not generally seen as a form of attempted suicide. It was decriminalized in 1993. Assisted suicide and euthanasia are illegal. This has been challenged in the High Court in 2012. As of 2014, assisted suicide remains illegal in Ireland.

=== Malaysia ===
Attempted suicide has been officially decriminalised in Malaysia since 10 September 2025, when the Penal Code (Amendment) (No. 2) Act 2023 came into force on that day.

Previously under section 309 of the Penal Code of Malaysia, "whoever attempts to commit suicide, and does any act towards the commission of such offence, shall be punished with imprisonment for a term which may extend to one year or with fine or with both".

Before attempted suicide was officially decriminalised in 2025, there has been multiple calls from rights groups and non-governmental organisations to decriminalise attempted suicide, although Befrienders in 2022 has noted that the progress has been slow in Malaysia. Proponents of decriminalisation has argued section 309 may deter people from seeking help, and may even strengthen the resolve of would-be suicides to end their lives to avoid prosecution.

In October 2021, deputy health minister Aaron Ago Dagang under the Ismail Sabri's administration announced that the Home Ministry and the Attorney General's Chambers (AGC) have agreed to the repeal of section 309, which received widespread praise from health experts and civil societies. In December 2021, law minister Wan Junaidi revealed that a study by AGC to decriminalise suicide is underway. In March the following year, Wan Junaidi said the study is nearing completion and will be submitted to the Cabinet for consideration soon.

On 4 April 2023, the Penal Code (Amendment) (No. 2) Bill 2023 was tabled by the Anwar Ibrahim's administration in the Malaysian Parliament to repeal section 309 of the Penal Code. A moratorium on the enforcement of section 309 was also imposed until the amendment went into effect. The bill was unanimously passed by the Dewan Rakyat on 22 May and the Dewan Negara on 21 June the same year.

The bill received royal assent on 5 August 2023 and was subsequently gazetted on 11 August 2023 as Penal Code (Amendment) (No.2) Act 2023. Two years later, the law officially went into effect on 10 September 2025, thereby ending the criminalisation of attempted suicide in Malaysia, in conjunction with the World Suicide Prevention Day.

=== Netherlands ===
In the Netherlands, being present and giving moral support during someone's suicide is not a crime; neither is supplying general information on suicide techniques. However, it is a crime to participate in the preparation for or execution of a suicide, including supplying lethal means or instruction in their use.

=== New Zealand ===
As with many other western societies, New Zealand has, since the 1961 Crimes Act, had no laws against suicide in itself, as a personal and unassisted act. Assisted suicide and voluntary euthanasia will be legal in certain circumstances as from 7 November 2021.

=== Norway ===
Neither suicide nor attempted suicide is illegal in Norway. However, complicity is.

=== Romania ===
Suicide itself is not illegal in Romania, however encouraging or facilitating the suicide of another person is a criminal offense and is punishable by maximum 20 years imprisonment, depending on circumstances.

=== Russian Federation ===
In Russia, a person whose mental disorder "poses a direct danger to themself" can be put into a psychiatric hospital. In addition, after hospitalization in a psychiatric hospital, such a citizen of the Russian Federation may be subject to medical restrictions in the form of a driver's license or non-admission to obtain them, as well as such citizens are not allowed to serve in the army, police and other law enforcement agencies and many other restrictions on employment.

In practice, this happens as follows: A failed suicider, detained by the police, for example, is taken to the department, then a psychiatric ambulance is called, a psychiatrist on duty who arrives at the scene decides whether a citizen detained by the police needs hospitalization. In case of hospitalization in a psychiatric hospital, the patient is placed in a ward of enhanced supervision for the first three days, then transferred to the suicidology department. In most cases, such citizens are kept in hospital for no more than one month, in rare cases longer, but very rarely they are discharged less than a month after hospitalization.

Incitement to suicide:

Inciting someone to suicide by threats, cruel treatment, or systematic humiliation is punishable by up to 5 years in prison. (Article 110 of the Criminal Code of the Russian Federation)

Federal law of Russian Federation no. 139-FZ of 2012-07-28 prescribes censorship of information about methods of suicide on the Internet. According to a website created by the Pirate Party of Russia, some pages with suicide jokes have been blacklisted, which may have led to blocking of an IP address of Wikia.

=== Singapore ===
Suicide has been decriminalized since 5 May 2019, with the passing of the Criminal Law Reform Act, which repealed Section 309 of the Singapore Penal Code. The law took effect on 1 January 2020.

=== South Africa ===
South African courts, including the Appellate Division, have ruled that suicide and attempted suicide are not crimes under the Roman-Dutch law, or that if they ever were crimes, they have been abrogated by disuse. Attempted suicide was from 1886 to 1968 a crime in the Transkei, a former bantustan, under the Transkeian Territories Penal Code.

=== United Kingdom ===
==== England, Wales and Northern Ireland ====
Suicide was never a statutory criminal offence. English common law perceived suicide as an immoral, criminal offence against God and also against the Crown. The common law offence of felo de se was used to punish people who had attempted suicide and their surviving relatives. A person who had died by suicide could have been denied burial, or their estate forfeited to the Crown, while survivors of suicide attempts could be punished by probation orders (by far the most common sanction) imprisonment or, more rarely, a fine. Posthumous punishment stopped in 1823, and appetite for punishing survivors of suicide attempts waned until this was decriminalized by the passing of the Suicide Act 1961 and the Criminal Justice Act (Northern Ireland) 1966; these same acts made it an offence to assist in a suicide.

With respect to civil law the simple act of suicide is lawful but the consequences of dying by suicide might turn an individual event into an unlawful act, as in the case of Reeves v Commissioners of Police of the Metropolis [2000] 1 AC 360, where a man in police custody hanged himself and was held equally liable with the police (a cell door defect enabled the hanging) for the loss suffered by his widow; the practical effect was to reduce the police damages liability by 50%. In 2009, the House of Lords ruled that the law concerning the treatment of people who accompanied those who died of assisted suicide was unclear, following Debbie Purdy's case that this lack of clarity was a breach of her human rights. (In her case, as someone with multiple sclerosis, she wanted to know whether her husband would be prosecuted for accompanying her abroad where she might eventually wish to die of assisted suicide, if her illness progressed).

==== Scotland ====
Suicide was never a statutory criminal offence. Under Scots Law, survivors of suicide attempts may be arrested and prosecuted for associated common law offences such as breach of the peace or culpable and reckless conduct. Although the Scottish Government has never legislated to formally decriminalize suicide, a 2009 Appeal Court case, which found that a breach of the peace must have an element of disruption to the community, substantially reduced the likelihood of securing a successful prosecution for suicide attempts. Subsequently the Crown Office and Procurator Fiscal Service instructed Police Scotland to deal with cases of attempted suicide which come to their notice by means other than arrest, even where an offence such as breach of the peace may have been committed. Police Scotland has advised officers:

...persons attempting or threatening suicide were no longer to be arrested for a breach of the peace unless the actions have caused or threatened to cause injury to another or endangered or threatened to another person's safety (e.g. threatening to jump from a bridge onto a motorway)... As a result of the COPFS direction, the common law charge of Suicidal Breach of the Peace is no longer competent in the vast majority of cases involving people in mental health crisis. Officers should refrain from using it to simply utilise the power of arrest and place someone in custody because it's operationally expedient to do so.

Despite these recommendations, occasional arrests and prosecutions for suicide attempts continue. Consequential liability upon a person attempting suicide (or if dead, his/her estate) might arise under civil law where it parallels the civil liabilities recognized in the (English Law) Reeves case mentioned above.

Assisting a suicide in Scotland can in some circumstances constitute murder, culpable homicide, or no offence depending upon the facts of each case. No modern examples of cases devoid of direct application of intentional or unintentional harm (such as helping a person to inject themselves) seem to be available; it was noted in a consultation preceding the introduction of the Assisted Suicide (Scotland) Bill that "the law appears to be subject to some uncertainty, partly because of a lack of relevant case law".

=== United States ===
In the United States, some topics are determined by federal law whereas others differ across states. The information on suicide prevention legislation will be discussed at the federal level first and will be followed by those states that have some form of legislation.

==== Federal legislation ====
In 2004, Congress passed the Garrett Lee Smith Memorial Act (GLSMA). The GLSMA made federal funding available to states, tribes, and colleges across the nation to implement community-based youth and young adult suicide prevention programs. Many of these programs had goals based on the National Suicide Prevention Strategy that was designed in 2001, including increased community-based prevention and stigma reduction among others.

In October 2020, the National Suicide Hotline Designation Act came into effect. This law states that there was to be a transition from a 10-digit hotline number to a universal 3-digit hotline number, which should be familiar and recognizable to everyone. On top of that, in May 2021, the Suicide Prevention Act passed the House, and was being considered by the Senate. This Act would authorize a pilot program to intensify surveillance of self-harm and establish a grant program to provide more self-harm and suicide prevention services across the country.

On July 16, 2022, the US transitioned the National Suicide Hotline from the 10-digit number into the 988 Suicide & Crisis Lifeline, linking both the National Suicide Hotline, the Veterans Crisis Line, and a network of more than 200 state and local call centers run through SAMHSA, the Substance Abuse and Mental Health Services Administration.

==== State legislation ====
Historically, some states considered suicide a felony, but these policies were sparsely enforced. In the late 1960s, 32 U.S. states had laws against suicide. By the late 1980s, 20 of the 50 states criminalized suicide or suicide attempts, but every state declared it a felony to aid, advise, or encourage another person to suicide. By the early 1990s only Maryland and Virginia still listed suicide as a crime. In some U.S. states, suicide is still considered an unwritten "common law crime," as stated in Blackstone's Commentaries. (So held the Virginia Supreme Court in 1992. Wackwitz v. Roy, 418 S.E.2d 861 (Va. 1992)). As a common law crime, suicide can bar recovery for the late suicidal person's family in a lawsuit unless the suicidal person can be proven to have been "of unsound mind." That is, the suicide must be proven to have been an involuntary act of the victim in order for the family to be awarded monetary damages by the court. This can occur when the family of the deceased sues the caregiver (perhaps a jail or hospital) for negligence in failing to provide appropriate care. Some American legal scholars look at the issue as one of personal liberty. According to Nadine Strossen, former President of the ACLU, "The idea of government making determinations about how you end your life, forcing you...could be considered cruel and unusual punishment in certain circumstances, and Justice Stevens in a very interesting opinion in a right-to-die [case] raised the analogy."

As of 2019, suicide is illegal in Maryland, and has been prosecuted at least ten times between 2009 and 2019.

In Texas and some other states, Suicide during an investigation can be considered as a proof of guilt.

In New York State in 1917, while suicide was "a grave public wrong", an attempt to commit suicide was a felony, punishable by a maximum penalty of two years' imprisonment.

Suicide in Virginia was decriminalized in 2026, effective July 1, 2027.

Physician-assisted suicide is legal in ten states (Oregon, Washington, Montana, Vermont, California, Colorado, Hawaii, New Jersey, Maine, and New Mexico) and Washington D.C. as of 2024. For the terminally ill, it is legal in the state of Oregon under the Oregon Death with Dignity Act. In Washington state, it became legal in 2009, when a law modeled after the Oregon act, the Washington Death with Dignity Act was passed. A patient must be diagnosed as having less than six months to live, be of sound mind, make a request orally and in writing, have it approved by two different doctors, then wait 15 days and make the request again. A doctor may prescribe a lethal dose of a medication but may not administer it.

===== California =====
The State of California has passed several laws related to suicide over the last decade, most of which are related to youth. In 2016, Assembly Bill 2246 was passed, which required school districts to have a suicide prevention policy that addresses the needs of their highest-risk pupils in grades 7 to 12. Since then, the law has been amended twice. First, in 2018, AB 2639 was passed, which required school districts to update their policy once every five years. Then, in 2019, AB 1767 was passed. Because of this amendment, districts serving kindergarten to 6th grade will also have to have a suicide prevention policy.

Lastly, also in 2019, the governor signed AB 984. This law allows people to send their excess tax payments to a special Suicide Prevention Fund. This fund is supposed to award grants and help fund crisis centers. In California, medical facilities are empowered or required to commit anyone whom they believe to be suicidal for evaluation and treatment.

===== Utah =====
The State of Utah has passed the most laws relating to suicide prevention as of 2021, with a total of 21 suicide-related laws. A large number of these laws have been for school-based suicide prevention, including suicide prevention training for all school staff (HB 501), grant awards for programs in elementary schools to increase peer-to-peer suicide prevention (HB 346), and an expanded scope to specifically include the suicide risk of youth not accepted by family, especially LGBTQ youth (HB 393). Other laws have included topics such as increased attention for suicide prevention in substance use treatment (HB 346), bereavement services (HB 336), and suicide prevention programs related to firearm use (HB 17). Moreover, the Utah Division of Substance Abuse and Mental Health (DSAMH) has Zero Suicides as one of their policies, using this as a framework to guide their actions.

== See also ==
- Legality of euthanasia
- Right to die
- State-assisted suicide
- Suicide prevention
