= R (Adam, Limbuela and Tesema) v Secretary of State for the Home Department =

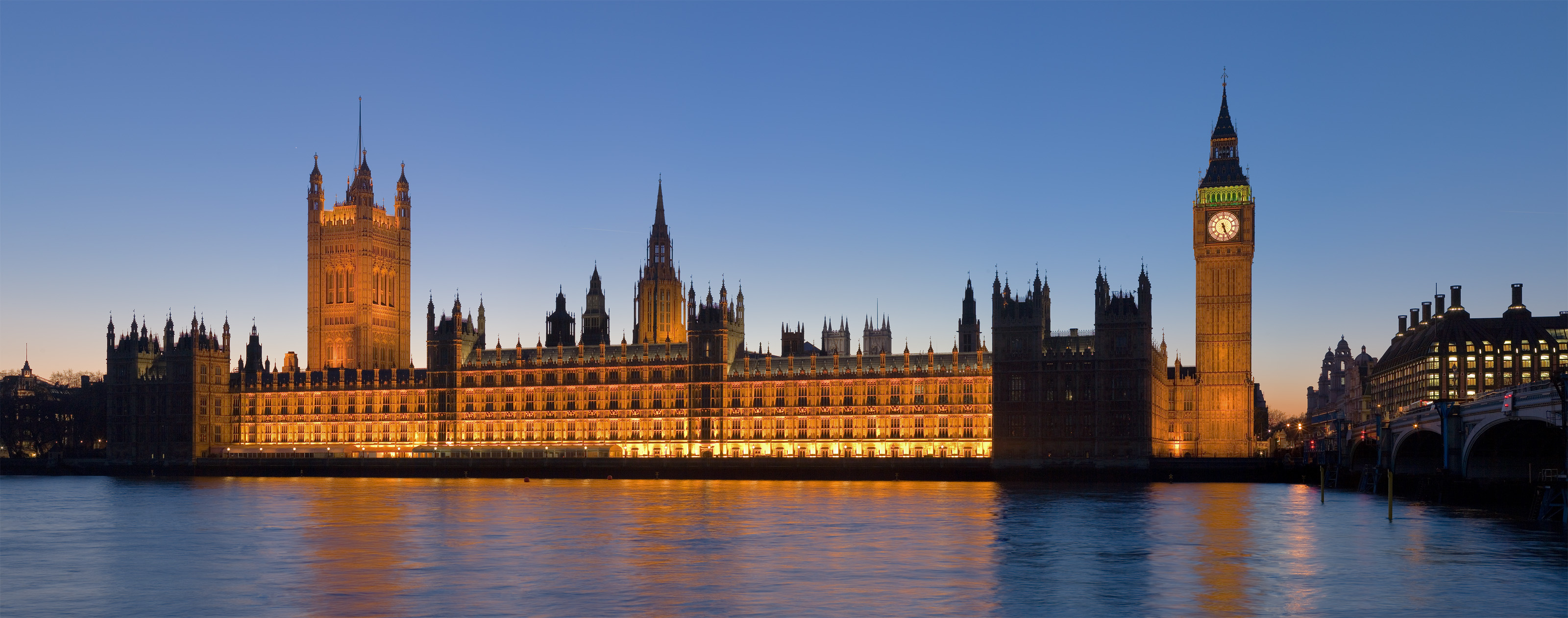
- Court: House of Lords
- Decided: 3 November 2005
- Citation: [2005] UKHL 66
- Transcript: [2005 UKHL 66]

Case history
- Prior action: England and Wales Court of Appeal (Civil Division) [2004] EWCA Civ 540

Court membership
- Judge sitting: Lord Bingham Lord Hope Lord Scott Baroness Hale Lord Brown

R (Adam, Limbuela and Tesema) v Secretary of State for the Home Department was a case decided on 3 November 2005 by the UK House of Lords that determined whether or not a delay in initiating an application to seek asylum limited an individual from receiving access to state relief. Furthermore, the case questioned whether this denial of state relief constituted a breach of the European Convention on Human Rights 1950 ('ECHR').

The Home Office refused the claimants state support under Section 55 of the Nationality, Immigration, and Asylum Act 2002, under the basis that the asylum seekers did not make their claim as soon as reasonably practical. Article 3 of the ECHR prohibits torture, inhuman or degrading treatment and/or punishment of individuals. In this case, the court observed that due to this refusal of state support, Yusif Adam, Wayoka Limbuela and Binyam Tefera Tesema were exposed to the risk of being homeless, were without access to food and were prevented from working while waiting for their application to be processed. These circumstances were thus considered to be an Article 3 violation, and led the House of Lords to dismiss the Appeal with costs and grant state relief to the claimants under Section 55(5) of the Act.

Following this judgment, asylum seekers who apply late may receive accommodation and financial support if the alternative is a real risk of destitution and a violation of human rights.

== Background ==
Following Royal Assent on 7 November 2002 the then Minister for Citizenship and Immigration, Beverley Hughes, ushered in the Nationality, Immigration and Asylum Act 2002. This Act required all adult asylum seekers make an application for asylum support. Section 55 (1) of the Act prevents the Home Office and other public authorities in the UK from providing support and accommodation to asylum seekers unless satisfied that the applicant's claim for asylum was made as soon as reasonably practicable after their arrival in the UK. A three-day time frame is used as a general guideline to satisfy this "as soon as reasonably practicable" test, but dependent on the particular circumstances of each individual it may be decided that the applicant could not have claimed within that period, or that the applicant should have claimed earlier.

Yusif Adam arrived in the UK from Sudan, Wayoka Limbuela arrived in the UK from Angola, and Binyam Tefera Tesema arrived in the UK from Ethiopia. Each of the claimants claimed asylum the following day upon arriving in the UK. All three asylum claimants were refused state report due to the operation of Section 55 of the Act, and this limited their access to adequate shelter, food and other necessary requirements until they were later granted interim relief following the judicial review of their applications.

Adam had been sleeping rough in a shelterless car park from 16 October 2003 to 10cNovember 2003, almost one month. He had access to the Refugee Council's premises during the day but due to the lack of proper shelter his mental and physical health deteriorated. When Limbuela's application for judicial review was heard he had already been forced to sleep rough for two days and beg for food due to the lack of state support. Other evidence of destitution presented to the hearing judge included a series of medical complaints from which Limbuela was suffering that were exacerbated by Secretary of State's refusal. Similarly, Tesema was about to be evicted from his emergency accommodation and if he had been, he would have had no access to housing, no money for food, and no private sanitary facilities.

Adam, Limbuela, and Tesema were each successful in their application for judicial review in the Administrative Court, which was later upheld by the Court of Appeal. The Home Office then appealed to the House of Lords. The Appellant, the Home Office, refused the claimants state support under Section 55 of the Act which allowed the Home Office to refuse support to asylum seekers who did not make their claim for asylum as soon as reasonably practicable. The Court of Appeal, and subsequently the House of Lords, observed this legislation with reference to Section 55(5) that allows an exception that provides that support should still be provided to asylum-seekers if a failure to do so would violate their human rights.

Hence, Adam, Limbuela, and Tesema responded by arguing that their circumstances satisfied the provision in Section 55(5)(a) which entitled them to receive state support from the Home Office due to violation of their rights under the ECHR (within the meaning of the Human Rights Act 1998).

The charity Shelter, and the National Council for Civil Liberties and Justice provided written submissions in support of the appellants as Interveners. The Appellant was represented by Nigel Griffin QC, John-Paul Waite and Kate Grange (instructed by Treasury Solicitor). The Respondents were represented by Nicholas Blake QC, with White Ryland as instructing solicitors for Limbuela and Tesema and H C L Hanne & Co as instructing solicitors for Adam.

== Decision ==
Firstly, the House of Lords had to determine in what circumstances did the Secretary of State become obliged to provide state support and relief to an asylum seeker who did not make their application as soon as reasonably practicable after arriving in the UK under Section 55 of the Act.

Secondly, the House of Lords needed to determine in what circumstances would the refusal of state support and relief by the Secretary of State constitute a breach of Article 3 of ECHR rights.

=== Standard of Proof required to trigger Section 55(5)(a) ===
The legislation prohibits the Home Office from providing state support to asylum applicants if they had not done so as soon as reasonably practicable. However, Section 55(5)(a) provides an exception where support can be given if it is necessary in order to prevent a breach of rights under the ECHR.

The House of Lords decided that within Article 3 there was no general public duty to provide support to the destitute, however there will be circumstances where the threshold may be crossed when a late applicant has no means and no alternative source of support.

Lord Bingham identified that the Home Office's statutory duty was triggered:

"when it appears on a fair and objective assessment of all relevant facts and circumstances that an individual applicant faces an imminent prospect of serious suffering caused or materially aggravated by denial of shelter, food or the most basic necessities of life".

Furthermore, the House of Lords confirmed that:

"Many factors may affect that judgment, including age, gender, mental and physical health and condition, any facilities or sources of support available to the applicant, the weather and time of year and the period for which the applicant has already suffered or is likely to continue to suffer privation."

It was determined that although the State had not inflicted violence or punishment on the Respondents, they were still held responsible for leaving them in a position of destitution for it was the statutory regime itself that removed any form of support to access food, shelter and employment opportunities that would assist them in supporting themselves.

Lord Scott further acknowledged that the Home Office's mere failure to provide a minimum level of social support could not engage Article 3, but saw it as different if the statutory regime imposed restrictions on an individual's access to basic social security and other state benefits, which he or she would be entitled to if not for the legislation.

=== Article 3 of the ECHR Threshold ===
Article 3 of the ECHR states that:

"No one shall be subjected to torture or to inhuman or degrading treatment or punishment."

The House of Lords applied the precedent in Pretty v. United Kingdom [2002] 35 EHRR 1 in order to determine if the refusal of support violated Article 3 of the ECHR.

Lord Hope and Lord Bingham both referenced paragraph [52] of the judgment where the European Court observed what types of "treatment" would fall within the scope of Article 3. The Court referred to "ill-treatment" that attains "a minimum level of severity and involves actual bodily injury or intense physical or mental suffering", "where treatment humiliates or debases an individual, showing a lack of respect for, or diminishing, his or her human dignity, or arouses feelings of fear, anguish or inferiority capable of breaking an individual's moral and physical resistance, it may be characterised as degrading and also fall within the prohibition of Article 3".

Therefore, on this basis it was determined that the circumstances suffered by Adam, Limbuela and Tesema had reached this necessary degree of severity to be considered "inhuman or degrading treatment". The Home Office therefore should have provided state relief by power under section 55(5)(a), and the duty under section 6(1) of the Human Rights Act 1998.

=== Boundary between Positive and Negative Obligations ===
The distinction between positive and negative duties is mirrored in the traditional division between civil and political rights which are designed to "restrain the State from intruding", and socio-economic rights which "elicit protection by the State". Lady Hale described the boundary between a positive and negative obligation as not "clear cut", and Lord Brown stated that 'Time and again these are shown to be false dichotomies.'

Ultimately, Lord Brown and Lord Hope agreed that it was more important to view the issue in terms of whether "the state is to be properly regarded as responsible for the harm inflicted (or threatened) upon the victim" thus the question of whether there was a positive obligation, rather than mere inaction, was not further explored in this decision.

== Significance ==
The result of this case was particularly relevant due to the political climate at the time, where issues surrounding the integrity of the UK's borders and the asylum process were under serious debate. It marked the development of the UK's growing global commitment to protecting universal human rights through its legislative frameworks. However, whilst this case's decision was a progressive interpretation of Article 3, the threshold remains high and courts will continue to be bound by this provision in some circumstances.

=== Universal Human Rights ===
This case highlighted the importance of the universality of human rights obligations. Rather than focusing on 'citizens' rights, the outcome of this case heralded a major legislative change that moved the UK Government away from discriminatory social policies and provisions, and more towards protecting human rights. The ECHR was drafted to represent an egalitarian vision of human rights, where all rights are guaranteed by virtue of existence. However, the discriminatory application of Section 55 in this case was one example of how the UK government experienced the struggle between ensuring equality and non-discrimination in its treatment of asylum seekers, whilst also protecting citizen's rights and democracy when allocating resources for the people within its jurisdiction. Hence, authors suggest that the majority decision in the House of the Lords avoided giving any hints on their own views on the UK Government's policy but left room for substantive review

Academic Sandra Fredman noted that attempts to draw a clear distinction between negative and positive obligations has been strained by the need to balance civil and political rights on one hand, and socio-economic rights on the other when it comes to human rights cases. Fredman further states that nowhere is the difficulty in achieving this balance more apparent than in cases brought before the courts by asylum seekers who have had their state relief withdrawn and are as a result living in dire circumstances.

=== Response ===
A 2006 Refugee Action Report stated that preceding the judgment of this case, approximately 14,760 asylum seekers applied to the Home Office for support and were then referred for a decision under Section 55. Out of the applications who were considered to have applied on time, not including those with dependents, 9,410 were refused on the basis that they did not meet the threshold under Section 55 of the Act. The following year it was reported that 1,565 applicants were referred for a decision, and only 225 applicants were refused support by the Home Office.

Housing charity Shelter, which supported the three claimants in their cases welcomed the decision. Shelter's director, Adam Sampson, said: "This judgment is a victory for very vulnerable people who are in desperate need with nowhere to turn. We hope that it will now not only implement the court's guidance, but also undertake a thorough review of Section 55 called for by the home affairs select committee."

The Home Office admitted section 55 was "a tough measure", it said: "The essential point of section 55 is that we are not prepared to use taxpayers' money on supporting people who make speculative asylum claims or who have some alternative source of support." Furthermore, they stated that they endeavoured to ensure that economic migrants were not abusing section 55 and would not be supported at the public's expense.

== See also ==
- Pretty v United Kingdom
- Human rights in the United Kingdom
