= Felo de se =

Legal concept of forfeiture used against suicides

Felo de se (from Medieval Latin fel[l]ō dē sē, "felon of him-/herself") was a concept applied against the personal estates (assets) of adults who died by suicide. Early English common law, among others, by this concept considered suicide a crime—a person found guilty of it, though dead, would ordinarily see penalties including forfeiture of property to the monarch and a shameful burial. Beginning in the seventeenth century precedent and coroners' custom gradually deemed suicide temporary insanity—court-pronounced conviction and penalty to heirs were gradually phased out.

== Detailed evolution ==
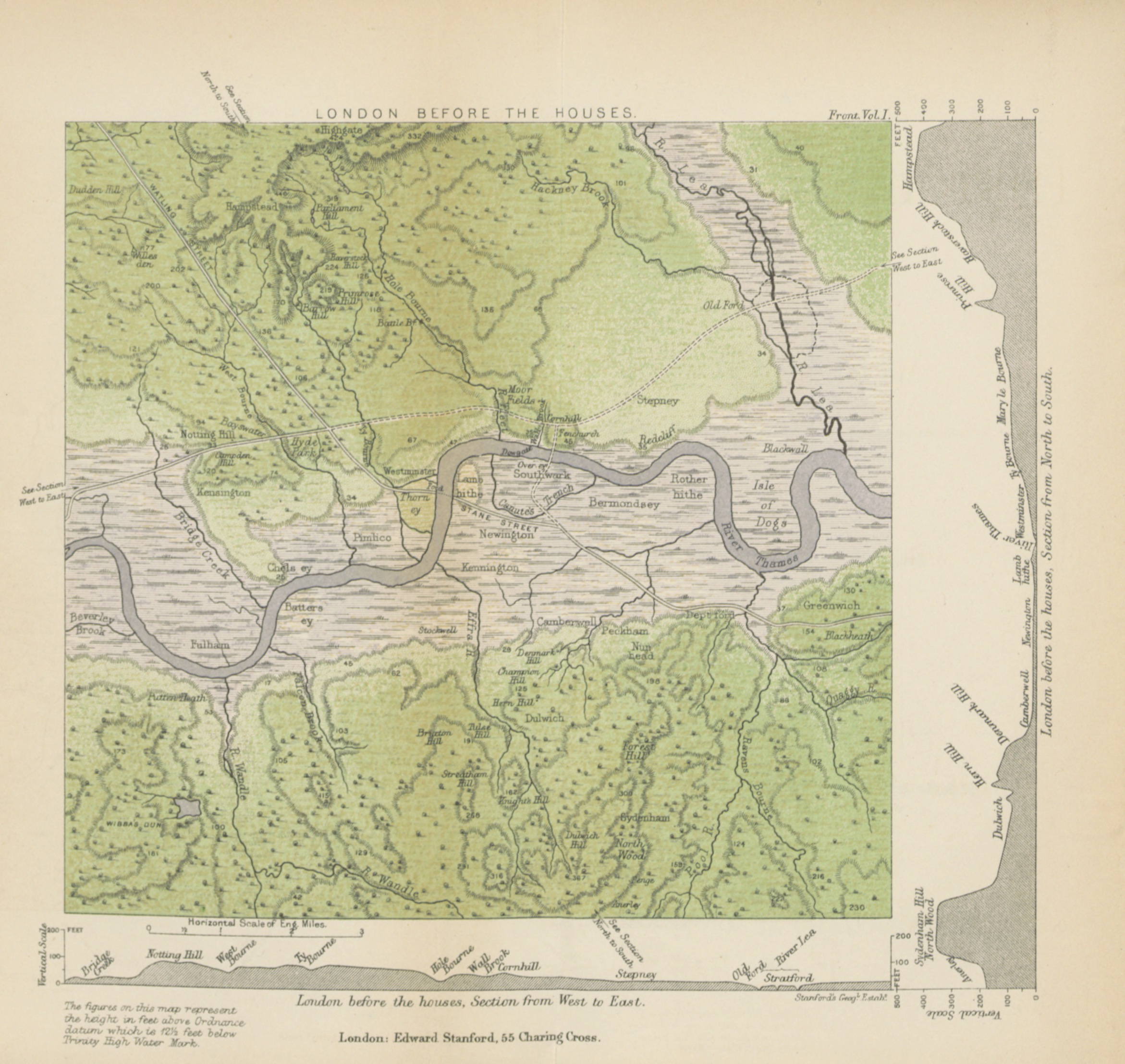
Extract from London Before the Houses, W. E. Loftie, 1884, showing at centre in Middlesex beyond old London's limits an elevated key crossroads, for centuries, a place of hanging convicts, the Tyburn Tree and of Ossulstone (Oswald's Stone); today by Marble Arch. Roadside burials were also a slur in the Roman Empire.

Until the end of the widespread phasing out mentioned below, in English common law suicides were felons. The crime was punishable by forfeiture (great loss of property) to the monarch and what was considered a shameful burial – typically with a stake through the heart and at a crossroads. Burials for felones de se typically took place at night, with no mourners nor clergy; the place was often kept secret by justices of the peace, coroners and local undertakers.

A child or lunatic (a term which included the demonstrably mentally disabled) who killed themself was excepted from this post mortem offence, which resembled attainder.

Burial at the place mentioned persisted until the Burial of Suicides Act 1823 abolished it. By this, the remains should be buried in a churchyard (with minister attending), or other authorised place. This was broadened by the Interments (felo de se) Act 1882. Vestiges of the old practice persisted into the middle of the century. A news report in 1866 as to the case of Eli Sykes, a prisoner awaiting the death sentence at Armley gaol in Leeds, read the inquest jury returned a verdict of felo de se and "in consequence of that verdict the body would be buried at midnight, without any religious ceremony, within the precincts of the gaol".

The Burial Laws Amendment Act 1880 authorised any "Christian and orderly religious service" or no religious service, substituting that taken from the Church of England's Book of Common Prayer if required (i.e. if the deceased was known to be of other religion). The Act itself explicitly disclaimed any extension of the right to burial where it had not existed before; this was only provided for suicides by the 1882 Act.

== Phasing out ==
In the seventeenth and eighteenth centuries in England, as suicides came to be seen more and more as an act of temporary insanity, many coroner's juries began declaring more suicide victims as non compos mentis instead. As such the perpetrator's property was not forfeit (given to the Crown). MacDonald and Murphy write that "By the 1710s and 1720s, over 90 per cent of all suicides were judged insane, and after a period of more rigorous enforcement of the law, non compos mentis became in the last three decades of the century the only suicide verdict that Norwich Coroners returned. ... Non compos mentis had become the usual verdict in cases of suicide by the last third of the century."

== Repeal ==
=== England and Wales ===
In England and Wales, the offence of felo de se was abolished by section 1 of the Suicide Act 1961.

=== India ===
In 2017, the Indian Parliament passed a mental healthcare bill that (among other things) decriminalized attempts to commit suicide.

=== Ireland ===
As Ireland was under English rule (as the Lordship of Ireland and then the Kingdom of Ireland), similar felo de se laws were introduced. Common burial sites for suicides in Dublin were at The Long Meadow, Islandbridge, and at the Clonliffe Road–Ballybough Road crossroads. It is currently planned to erect a memorial at the latter site. Elsewhere in Ireland, suicides were often buried at cillín plots, which were also used for stillborn and unbaptised babies, executed criminals, shipwrecked bodies, beggars and other outsiders.

Dracula author Bram Stoker grew up near the Crossroads burial site, and wrote in "Dracula's Guest" about "the old custom of burying suicides at crossroads."

In Ireland, suicide was punished by "ignominious burial" until 1823 (Burial of Suicide Act) and punished by forfeiture of property until 1872 (Forfeiture Act 1870).

Suicide was decriminalised in Northern Ireland by the Criminal Justice Act (Northern Ireland) 1966.

In the Republic of Ireland, suicide did not cease to be a crime until 1993, with the passage of the Criminal Law (Suicide) Act, 1993.

=== United States ===
In the 1700s, many English colonies in what is now the United States decriminalized suicide. Later state laws against suicide and its attempt have been widely repealed; by the 1990s two states had the crime (or that of attempt) in their legal canon.

== Use in literature ==
"Felo de se" titles works by

- fin de siècle poet Amy Levy
- Georgian poet Richard Hughes.

It entitles a novel by R. Austin Freeman.

It is referred to in Benjamin Britten's opera Albert Herring as a reason to explain the sudden disappearance of Albert after being crowned May King.

== Examples ==
- 1854—Joseph Zillwood, Lyttelton, New Zealand.
- 1919—John Moss, aged 44 and of 8 Foster Street, Chorley, Lancashire, went missing just after 8 o'clock on the morning of 25 February 1919. He had just been questioned by police in his workplace about an attack on a family in their home in Geoffrey Street. Three weeks later, on 18 March 1919, Moss's body was recovered from the Leeds and Liverpool Canal. At an inquest the following day, the coroner said that there was no evidence that Moss had an unsound mind and had murdered himself in his right senses, and a verdict of "felo de se" was returned.
