= Non compos mentis =

Latin legal phrase meaning "of unsound mind"

Non compos mentis is a Latin legal phrase that translates to "of unsound mind": nōn ("not") prefaces compos mentis, meaning "having control of one's mind." This phrase was used in English law as early as the seventeenth century to describe people afflicted by madness, the loss of memory or ability to reason.

== Usage ==
The status of non compos mentis applied to those who were not mad from birth, but became so later in life through no fault of their own. The property and interests of such a person could be placed in state custody to conserve them for the person's benefit. Their criminal culpability was also limited except in cases of high treason. This contrasted with "natural fools" who were mad from birth and whose property was held for benefit of the crown, and habitual drunkards, who could claim no defense of madness.

== Prosecution of suicide ==
Non compos mentis and felo de se (the Latin word for "self-murder") presented two different verdicts in the case of a suicide. In the finding of a jury, the deceased who was stigmatized felo de se would be excluded from burial in consecrated ground and would forfeit their estate to the Crown, while these penalties would not apply to the deceased affirmed non compos mentis.

Suicide was a severe crime in Tudor and early Stuart England and was considered a form of murder; a sin not only in the eyes of the Church but also defined by criminal law. The state of mind of self-killers at the time they committed their fatal deed was crucial. To be judged guilty of "self-murder", one had to be sane. Men and women who killed themselves when they were mad or otherwise mentally incompetent were considered innocent. The verdict would be made by a jury. The penalty for suicide in England originated in the ancient world and evolved gradually into their early modern form; similar laws and customs existed in many parts of Europe. Born of domestic beliefs, the ritual of punishing suicide, which is usually concerned with the suicidal corpse, embodies the notion that suicide is polluting, and that the suicide should be ostracized by the community of the living and the dead. The theological and legal severity increased in the High Middle Ages. The medieval theologian Thomas Aquinas extended Augustine's arguments against suicide and added the new interpretation of "violation of natural law" to it. Most western European governments began to promulgate laws to confiscate some of a suicide's property.

However, attitudes to suicide changed profoundly after 1660, following the English Revolution. After the civil war, political and social changes, judicial and ecclesiastical severity gave way to official leniency for most people who died by suicide. Non compos mentis verdicts increased greatly, and felo de se verdicts became as rare as non compos mentis had been two centuries earlier. However, the laws against suicide and the verdicts felo de se and non compos mentis did not fade until the late nineteenth century.
