= Section 309 of the Indian Penal Code =

Indian penal code for suicide

Section 309 of the Indian Penal Code criminalised attempted suicide as well as suicide assistance.

Section 309 stated:

Whoever attempts to commit suicide and does any act towards the commission of such offence, shall be punished with simple imprisonment for a term which may extend to one year or with fine, or with both.

Although section 309 was still in effect, the Mental Healthcare Act, 2017 (enacted July 2018) has restricted its application. The relevant provision of the new act states:

Notwithstanding anything contained in section 309 of the Indian Penal Code, any person who attempts to commit suicide shall be presumed, unless proved otherwise, to have severe stress and shall not be tried and punished under the said Code.

The Indian Penal Code was replaced by Bharatiya Nyaya Sanhita (BNS), which came into effect on July 1, 2024. The Bharatiya Nyaya Sanhita does not include an equivalent clause to Section 309 that criminalized attempted suicide in India, hereby attempted suicide was officially decriminalised in India through the introduction of BNS.

== Path to repeal ==
In the 1996 Gian Kaur vs State of Punjab, the appellant failed to convince the five judge bench that section 309 violated article 21 of the Constitution of India. A bill to strike the section was subsequently introduced in parliament, but failed to pass.

On 7 March 2011, the Supreme Court recommended that Parliament consider deleting section 309 from the statute.

On 10 December 2014, in response to a question by Vivek Gupta in the Rajya Sabha on decriminalisation of suicide, the Minister of State for Home Affairs, Haribhai Chaudhary replied that "it has been decided to delete Section 309 of IPC from the Statute book."

On 24 February 2015, the Minister of State in the Ministry of Home Affairs, Haribhai Parathibhai Chaudhary, said that a proposal to delete Section 309 from the Indian Penal Code had been sent to the Legislative Department of the Ministry of Law and Justice for drawing up a draft Amendment Bill.

== Restriction by other acts of parliament ==
Section 309 of the Indian Penal Code was set to be limited in effect by the Mental Health Care bill, first introduced to the Rajya Sabha on 19 August 2013.

Section 115 of the bill initially stipulated that "Notwithstanding anything contained in section 309 of the Indian Penal Code, any person who attempts to commit suicide shall be presumed, unless proved otherwise, to be suffering from mental illness at the time of attempting suicide and shall not be liable to punishment under the said section." The bill also stipulated that the Government would have a duty to provide medical care to persons that attempted suicide. The bill was referred by the Rajya Sabha to a standing committee on 18 September 2013, which submitted a report on 20 November 2013. In its report, the standing committee expressed three concerns on article 124: firstly, that the presumption of mental illness would subject persons to 'mental health treatment', secondly, concerns about the consequences on Section 306 of the Penal Code, which concerns abetment to suicide, and thirdly, concerns regarding the "institutionalization in silencing victims of domestic violence."

In response, the Ministry proposed amendments which would change the language of this provision to one concerning the "presumption of severe stress in case of attempt to commit suicide". The Committee accepted this recommendation, noting that there was still ambiguity regarding the stage at which this presumption would operate.

The bill was voted upon and passed by the Rajya Sabha on 8 August 2016, and passed by the Lok Sabha on 27 March 2017. The bill was subsequently enacted in July 2018 as the Mental Healthcare Act, 2017.

The Mental Health Care Act does not repeal Section 309 of the Indian Penal Code, but merely provides the presumption of mental illness.

== See also ==
- Suicide legislation
- Euthanasia
