= Burial of Suicides Act 1823 =

Act of the Parliament of the United Kingdom

- Act of Parliament
- Parliament of the United Kingdom
- Long title: An Act to alter and amend the Law relating to the Interment of the Remains of any Person found Felo de se.
- Citation: 4 Geo. 4. c. 52
- Territorial extent: England and Wales (Note: Section 1.)

Dates
- Royal assent: 8 July 1823
- Commencement: 8 July 1823
- Repealed: 3 July 1882
Other legislation
Repealed by	Interments (felo de se) Act 1882

Status: Repealed

Text of statute as originally enacted

The Burial of Suicides Act 1823 (4 Geo. 4. c. 52), also known as the Right to Burial Act 1823, was an act of the Parliament of the United Kingdom granted royal assent on 8 July that year and coming into effect on that date.

It removed the ban on burial of suicides in consecrated ground and banned the previous practices of burying them on highways and with a stake through the body. It stipulated that such burials had to occur between 9 pm and midnight within 24 hours of the conclusion of the coroner's inquest on the body and only allowed the use of the burial service if the body was in a churchyard or burial yard, without a stake, within those timings, and without a Christian service.

== Subsequent developments ==
The whole act was repealed by section 1 of the Interments (felo de se) Act 1882 (45 & 46 Vict. c. 19), which came into force on 3 July 1882.
