= Joseph Zillwood =

New Zealand policeman (1804–1854)

Joseph Zillwood (c. 1804 – 19 October 1854) was a New Zealand policeman, farmer and innkeeper. He was baptised in Cholderton, Wiltshire, England in December 1804. After marrying his second wife Betsy Rose in 1836, they moved to France where their first two children were born. They emigrated to New Zealand in 1839, with their daughter dying en route. They lived in Wellington, where two more children were born before his wife died in 1845. Becoming chief constable at Akaroa, he put his eldest son out to work and the younger two children into care, but struggled to pay for this from his reduced wages. Zillwood also worked as Akaroa's postmaster. He married again in 1850, and was reunited with his younger children, one of whom died in 1853. Later that year the local police force was halved and Zillwood lost his job. He turned to drink as his financial situation worsened, and his wife left him mid-1854.

After arranging his affairs, he shot himself in the mouth on Friday 13 October 1854 while on suicide watch and died of his wounds after several days of suffering. His body was buried at night without funeral rites after an inquest found him guilty of felo de se. This appears to be the earliest reported felo de se in New Zealand.
