= Diane Pretty =

British euthanasia campaigner (1958–2002)

Diane Pretty (15 November 1958 – 11 May 2002) was a British woman from Luton who was the focus of a debate about the laws of euthanasia in the United Kingdom during the early part of the 21st century. She had attempted to change British law so she could end her own life because of the pains and problems that she endured because of her terminal illness motor neurone disease. She said "I want to have a quick death without suffering, at home surrounded by my family".

Pretty had been diagnosed with motor neurone disease several years before. Over time, the disease worsened and made it impossible for her to move or communicate easily even though her mental faculties remained normal. The illness resulted in her having to be looked after round the clock by her husband and nurses, meaning that she could not commit suicide, which she had said she would do if she was able to. She stated a wish that her husband should be able to assist her in ending her life, but this is classed as assisted suicide, which is a criminal offence in England and Wales under the Suicide Act 1961. Because suicide is a lawful option for those capable of committing it; it could be argued that refusing the option to those disabled could be considered discrimination, which is unlawful under both UK and European law. As such, assisting someone in committing suicide who cannot do so themselves cannot be considered a "service" which can be deprived. Neither of these were argued in the courts.

Pretty took her case to court using the Human Rights Act 1998 to argue that the Director of Public Prosecutions should make a commitment not to prosecute anybody involved in helping her to die. She focused on Articles 3 and 8 in her argument. British courts did not accept Pretty's arguments, with the House of Lords, Britain's highest court at the time, eventually turning her case down. The European Court of Human Rights held in Pretty v. United Kingdom that the European Convention on Human Rights did not provide a right to die, and her appeal to that court also failed.

Pretty died aged 43, on 11 May 2002, following a series of lung and chest problems.

== See also ==
- Assisted suicide in the United Kingdom
