= Mental Health Act, 1987 =

1987 Act of the Parliament of India

Parliament of India
- Long title: An Act to consolidate and amend the law relating to the treatment and care of mentally ill persons, to make better provision with respect to their property and affairs and for matters connected therewith of incidental thereto.
- Citation: Act No. 14 of 1987
- Territorial extent: India
- Enacted by: Parliament of India
- Assented to: 22 May 1987

Repeals
- Indian Lunacy Act 1912 (4 of 1912); Lunacy Act 1977 (Jammu and Kashmir Act 25 of 1977 (1920 AD))

Repealed by
- Mental Healthcare Act, 2017
- Status: Repealed

In India, the Mental Health Act, 1987 was passed on 22 May 1987. The law was described in its opening paragraph as "An Act to consolidate and amend the law relating to the treatment and care of mentally ill persons, to make better provision with respect to their property and affairs and for matters connected therewith or incidental thereto."

The Act superseded the previously existing national law governing the mental health issues, the Indian Lunacy Act of 1912.

The Mental Health Care Act was passed on 7 April 2017, superseding this 1987 Act and was described in its opening paragraph as "An Act to provide for mental healthcare and services for persons with mental illness and to protect, promote and fulfil the rights of such persons during delivery of mental healthcare and services and for matters connected therewith or incidental thereto."
