= Interments (felo de se) Act 1882 =

Act of the Parliament of the United Kingdom

Interments (felo de se) Act 1882 (Note: Section 6.)
- Act of Parliament
- Parliament of the United Kingdom
- Long title: An Act to amend the law relating to the interment of any person found felo de se.
- Citation: 45 & 46 Vict. c. 19
- Territorial extent: England and Wales and the Channel Islands. (Note: Section 5.)

Dates
- Royal assent: 3 July 1882
- Commencement: 3 July 1882 (Note: The Acts of Parliament (Commencement) Act 1793)
- Repealed: 3 August 1961
Other legislation
Repeals/revokes	Burial of Suicide Act 1823
Repealed by	Suicide Act 1961
Relates to	Burial of Suicide Act 1823; Burial Laws Amendment Act 1880

Status: Repealed

Text of statute as originally enacted

The Interments (felo de se) Act 1882 (45 & 46 Vict. c. 19) was an act of the Parliament of the United Kingdom which allowed a person whose death was felo de se (criminal suicide) to be buried in a churchyard at any hour, and with the usual religious rites. Previously, suicides could be buried only between 9pm and midnight, and without rites. Sir James Stephen said that the act was "so worded as to lead any ordinary reader to suppose that till it passed suicides were buried at a crossroads with a stake through their bodies". Burial by the wayside had, in fact, been banned by the Burial of Suicide Act 1823 (4 Geo. 3. c. 52).

It shall not be lawful for any coroner or other officer haying authority to hold inquests to issue any warrant or other process directing the interment of the remains of persons against whom a finding of felo de se shall be had in any public highway, or with any stake being driven through the body of such person, but such coroner or other officer shall give directions for the interment of the remains of such person felo de se in the churchyard or other burial ground of the parish or place in which the remains of such person might by the laws or custom of England be inteired if the verdict of felo de se had not been found against such person. — Interments (felo de se) Act 1882, s. 2

The Suicide Act 1961 abolished felo de se and in consequence also repealed the 1882 act.

== Section 3 ==
Section 3 of the act allowed interment to be made in any way prescribed or authorised by the Burial Laws Amendment Act 1880 (43 & 44 Vict. c. 41). By section 13 of that act, any clergyman of the Church of England authorised to perform the burial service was permitted, in any case where the office for the burial of the dead according to the rites of the Church of England might not be used, to use at the burial ground such service, consisting of prayers taken from the Book of Common Prayer and portions of the Holy Scripture, as might be prescribed or approved by the ordinary.

== Subsequent developments ==
The whole act was repealed by section 3(2) of, and the second schedule to, the Suicide Act 1961 (9 & 10 Eliz. 2. c. 60), which came into force on 3 August 1961.

== See also ==
- Suicide legislation
