= State-assisted suicide =

State-assisted suicide is the use of government to commit suicide. It is usually performed by committing a capital crime and receiving a capital punishment.

State-assisted suicide was a popular method in medieval and Enlightenment era Scandinavia, where religion forbade suicide and suicidees were prohibited from religious burial. The usual method was to kill an infant - infanticide was a capital crime; and infants, once baptized, were considered to be pure and sinless and therefore certain to receive salvation. The death penalty, usually by beheading, gave the condemned a chance to atone his or her sins before death. This was also common in the German states of the same period; several states outlawed the practice, but to no avail.

Timothy McVeigh, who had contemplated suicide in the past, notably called his execution "state-assisted suicide." Zacarias Moussaoui also sought to kill himself through the justice system. A typical strategy for this purpose is to commit a capital offense and then refuse to plea bargain in the face of overwhelming evidence, all the while showing no remorse and making statements calculated to cause grave offense.

Amnesty International said "While "volunteer" executions are sometimes referred to as a form of state-assisted suicide, prisoner-assisted homicide would be a more accurate label."

== See also ==
- Suicide by cop
- Capital punishment
- Volunteer (capital punishment)
- Assisted suicide
