= Suicide Act 1961 =

Act of the Parliament of the United Kingdom

Suicide Act 1961 (Note: Section 3(1).)
- Act of Parliament
- Parliament of the United Kingdom
- Long title: An Act to amend the law of England and Wales relating to suicide and for purposes connected therewith.
- Citation: 9 & 10 Eliz. 2. c. 60
- Territorial extent: England and Wales, except as regards the amendments made by Part II of the First Schedule and except that the Interments (felo de se) Act 1882 (45 & 46 Vict. c. 19), is repealed also for the Channel Islands. (Note: Section 3(3).)

Dates
- Royal assent: 3 August 1961
- Commencement: 3 August 1961 (Note: The Acts of Parliament (Commencement) Act 1793.)
Other legislation
Amends	Extradition Act 1870; Forfeiture Act 1870; Coroners (Amendment) Act 1926; Children and Young Persons Act 1933; Magistrates' Courts Act 1952; Visiting Forces Act 1952; Army Act 1955; Air Force Act 1955; Naval Discipline Act 1957; Homicide Act 1957
Repeals/revokes	Interments (felo de se) Act 1882
Amended by	Criminal Law Act 1967; Statute Law (Repeals) Act 1974; Extradition Act 1989; Coroners and Justice Act 2009

Status: Amended

Text of statute as originally enacted

Revised text of statute as amended

Text of the Suicide Act 1961 as in force today (including any amendments) within the United Kingdom, from legislation.gov.uk.

The Suicide Act 1961 (9 & 10 Eliz. 2. c. 60) is an act of the Parliament of the United Kingdom. It decriminalised the act of suicide in England and Wales so that those who survived a suicide attempt would no longer be prosecuted.

Sections 1 and 2 of the act were enacted verbatim for Northern Ireland by sections 12 and 13 of the Criminal Justice Act (Northern Ireland) 1966.

== Analysis ==
Suicide is defined as the act of intentionally ending one's own life. Before the Suicide Act 1961, it was a crime to die by suicide and anyone who attempted and survived could be prosecuted and imprisoned, while the families of those who died could also potentially be prosecuted. In part, that criminalisation reflected religious and moral objections to suicide as self-murder. Augustine and Thomas Aquinas had formulated the view that whoever deliberately took away the life given to them by their Creator showed the utmost disregard for the will and authority of God and jeopardised their salvation, encouraging the Church to treat suicide as a sin. By the early 1960s, however, the Church of England was re-evaluating its stance on the criminality of suicide and decided that counselling, psychotherapy and suicide prevention intervention before the event took place would be a better solution than criminalisation of what amounted to an act of despair in this context.

Sir Charles Fletcher-Cooke was the principal figure behind the emergence, introduction and passage of this legislation. Before it was introduced in July 1961, Fletcher-Cooke had been unsuccessfully trying to introduce such a bill for the decriminalisation of suicide for over a decade beforehand. While Home Secretary Rab Butler supported the bill, Prime Minister Harold Macmillan did not. In the event, the bill passed into law easily, decriminalising suicide, but creating an offence of "assisting, aiding or abetting suicide", which became a pivotal clause for future debates about voluntary euthanasia several decades later.

The Suicide Act was, however, a significant piece of legislation for, while section 1 treated the previous legal rule that suicide is a crime as "abrogated", section 2(1) stated:

(1) A person (“D”) commits an offence if-

(a) D does an act capable of encouraging or assisting the suicide or attempted suicide of another person, and

(b) D's act was intended to encourage or assist suicide or an attempt at suicide.

(1A) The person referred to in subsection (1)(a) need not be a specific person (or class of persons) known to, or identified by, D.

(1B) D may commit an offence under this section whether or not a suicide, or an attempt at suicide, occurs.

(1C) An offence under this section is triable on indictment and a person convicted of such an offence is liable to imprisonment for a term not exceeding 14 years.

This created a new offence of "complicity in suicide", an effect unparalleled in this branch of the law because there is no other instance in which an accessory can incur liability when the principal does not commit a criminal offence. The situation with a conspiracy to assist a suicide is likewise unique: if an individual incapable of ending their own life enlists the aid of an outside party in performing the act, that party may be charged with conspiracy. The wording of s1(1) Criminal Law Act 1977 provides that a conspiracy will come into being if, when everything has been done to realise the agreement, some conduct:

(a) will necessarily amount to or involve the commission of any offence or offences by one or more of the parties to the agreement...

No offence will necessarily be committed by the suicide victim if the agreement is carried out, but the fact that it is legally impossible to commit the crime of suicide is irrelevant under the Criminal Attempts Act 1981.

The Terminally Ill Adults (End of Life) Bill was introduced to parliament in November 2024 by Labour MP Kim Leadbeater. This provides provisions for some terminally ill people to be assisted in ending their lives. Accordingly, if the bill became law, it would amend the Suicide Act to ensure that, only in these circumstances, section 2 of the Suicide Act 1961 does not apply.

== Human Rights Act 1998 ==
The first human rights challenge to s2(1) was mounted in 2001 under the European Convention on Human Rights (ECHR) in Pretty v Director of Public Prosecutions (2002) 1 AC 800 with the ECHR rejecting the application in Pretty v. UK (2346/02) shortly before her death by natural causes . Diane Pretty was suffering from motor neurone disease and was paralysed from the neck down, had little decipherable speech and was fed by a tube. She had only a few weeks to live, claimed to be frightened and distressed by the suffering and indignity and wanted her husband to provide her with assistance in ending her life when she felt unable to bear it any longer, although she intended to perform the final act herself. Because giving this assistance would expose the husband to liability under s2(1), the DPP was asked to agree not to prosecute. When this agreement was refused, the case began. Article 2 of the Convention provides:

1. Everyone's right to life shall be protected by law. No-one shall be deprived of his life intentionally save in the execution of a sentence of a court following his conviction of a crime for which this penalty is provided by law.

This direct challenge to the legislation sought to assert an individual's right of autonomy against public policies protecting the sanctity of human life. Mrs. Pretty's full capacity for informed, rational consent was not disputed by opposing counsel. In Re B (Adult: Refusal of Medical Treatment) (2002) 2 AER 449 the court had already decided that a patient could refuse treatment knowing that this would result in death. However, the court in this case drew a distinction between passively allowing death through omission and active assistance in suicide, as per R v Brown (1993) 2 All ER 75 (the famous Spanner case), which ruled that a person cannot lawfully consent to anything more than the infliction of minor injury. Thus, the standing adjudication in English common law is that, as dying is an inevitable consequence of life, the right to life under the Convention necessarily implies the obligation to have nature take its course.

== Subsequent developments ==
Section 2(4) of the act, from the beginning to the word " and ", was repealed by section 10(2) of, and part II of schedule 3 to, the Criminal Law Act 1967, which came into force on 1 January 1968.

Section 3(2) of, and schedule 2 to, the act were repealed by section 1 of, and part XI of the schedule to, the Statute Law (Repeals) Act 1974, which came into force on 27 June 1974.

== See also ==
- Suicide legislation (United Kingdom)
