= Mental Healthcare Act, 2017 =

Act of the Parliament of India

Mental Health Care Act, 2017

Parliament of India
- Long title: An Act to provide for mental healthcare and services for persons with mental illness and to protect, promote and fulfil the rights of such persons during delivery of mental healthcare and services and for matters connected therewith or incidental thereto.
- Citation: Act No. 10 of 2017
- Territorial extent: India
- Passed by: Rajya Sabha
- Passed: 30 March 2017
- Passed by: Lok Sabha
- Passed: 27 March 2017
- Assented to: 7 April 2017
- Commenced: 29 May 2018

Legislative history

Initiating chamber: Rajya Sabha
- Bill title: Mental Health Care Bill, 2013
- Bill citation: Bill No. LIV of 2013
- Introduced by: Ghulam Nabi Azad
- Introduced: 19 August 2013
- Committee report: Standing Committee Report

Final stages
- Reported from conference committee: 20 November 2013

Repeals
- Mental Health Act, 1987
- Status: In force

The Mental Health Care Act, 2017 was passed on 7 April 2017 and took effect on 29 May 2018. The opening paragraph describes the law as "An Act to provide for mental healthcare and services for persons with mental illness and to protect, promote and fulfil the rights of such persons during delivery of mental healthcare and services and for matters connected therewith or incidental thereto." This Act superseded the previously existing Mental Health Act, 1987, enacted on 22 May 1987.

It states that mental illness will be determined "in accordance with nationally and internationally accepted medical standards (including the latest edition of the International Classification of Diseases of the World Health Organization) as may be notified by the Central Government." Additionally, the Act asserts that no person or authority shall classify an individual as a person with mental illness unless directly in relation to the treatment of the illness. Notably, the Act effectively decriminalised attempted suicide, which was a punishable offence under Section 309 of the Indian Penal Code; the code has been replaced with the Bharatiya Nyaya Sanhita, 2023.

== Difference from Mental Health Act, 1987 ==
1. Decriminalisation of attempts to commit suicide to ensure that individuals attempting suicide are given opportunities for rehabilitation rather than criminal trial and punishment.
2. The Act seeks to fulfil India's international obligation under the Convention on the Rights of Persons with Disabilities and its Optional Protocol.
3. Empowerment of persons suffering from mental illness, departing from the 1987 law. It recognises the agency of people with mental illness, allowing them to make decisions regarding their health, provided that they have the appropriate knowledge to do so.
4. The Act aims to safeguard the rights of people with mental illness, along with access to healthcare and treatment without discrimination. Additionally, insurers must now provide medical insurance for the treatment of mental illness on the same basis as for physical illness.
5. Provisions for registering mental healthcare institutions and regulating the sector, along with establishing mental health boards to act as regulators.
6. Restricting the use of Electroconvulsive therapy (ECT) to only emergency cases, along with muscle relaxants and anaesthesia. Further, ECT is banned for minors.
7. Outlining the responsibilities of other agencies, such as the police, concerning people with mental illness.
8. Including measures for addressing stigma against mental illness.

== Attempt to commit suicide ==
The Act decriminalised attempt to commit suicide, which was a punishable offence under Section 309 of the Indian Penal Code. The code has since been replaced by the Bharatiya Nyaya Sanhita, 2023, which does not treat an attempt to commit suicide as a punishable offence unless it is done with the intent to compel or restrain any public servant from discharging his official duties as per Section 224. The specific wording of Section 224 is likely intended to deter self-immolation or hunger strike as forms of protest. The Act treats individuals who attempt to commit suicide more as patients and seeks to treat them instead of criminal punishment. The Act also provides mental healthcare professionals and establishments with procedures and government funding to assist individuals who attempted suicide in order to prevent the possibility of future attempts.
