= Burial Laws Amendment Act 1880 =

Act of the Parliament of the United Kingdom

Burial Laws Amendment Act 1880 (Note: Section 16.)
- Act of Parliament
- Parliament of the United Kingdom
- Long title: An Act to amend the Burial Laws.
- Citation: 43 & 44 Vict. c. 41
- Territorial extent: England and Wales; Channel Islands; (Note: Section 15.)

Dates
- Royal assent: 7 September 1880
- Commencement: 7 September 1880 (Note: Section 1.)
Other legislation
Amended by	Perjury Act 1911

Status: Amended

Text of statute as originally enacted

Revised text of statute as amended

Text of the Burial Laws Amendment Act 1880 as in force today (including any amendments) within the United Kingdom, from legislation.gov.uk.

The Burial Laws Amendment Act 1880 (43 & 44 Vict. c. 41) is an act of the Parliament of the United Kingdom. It is one of the Burial Acts 1852 to 1885.

The act is excluded by section 4 of the Welsh Church (Burial Grounds) Act 1945 (8 & 9 Geo. 6. c. 27).

For the construction of references in this act to a "parish" or "burial board", in the application of this act to Greater London, see section 44(4) of the London Government Act 1963.

From 1882 to 1961, the act was applied by section 3 of the Interments (felo de se) Act 1882 (45 & 46 Vict. c. 19).

== Provisions ==
=== Section 7 – Burials to be conducted in a decent and orderly manner and without obstruction ===
Section 7 of the act reads:

All burials under this Act, whether with or without a religious service, shall be conducted in a decent and orderly manner; and every person guilty of any riotous, violent, or indecent behaviour at any burial under this Act, or wilfully obstructing such burial or any such service as aforesaid thereat, or who shall, in any such churchyard or graveyard as aforesaid, deliver any address, not being part of or incidental to a religious service permitted by this Act, and not otherwise permitted by any lawful authority, or who shall, under colour of any religious service or otherwise, in any such churchyard or graveyard, wilfully endeavour to bring into contempt or obloquy the Christian religion, or the belief or worship of any church or denomination of Christians, or the members or any minister of any such church or denomination, or any other person, shall be guilty of a misdemeanor.

==== "Riotous" ====
This expression is defined by sections 10(3) and (4) of the Public Order Act 1986.

==== Sentence ====
A person guilty of this offence is liable to imprisonment for a term not exceeding two years.

Where a person is convicted on indictment of this offence, the court, if not precluded from sentencing an offender by its exercise of some other power, may impose a fine instead of or in addition to dealing with him in any other way in which the court has power to deal with him, subject however to any enactment requiring the offender to be dealt with in a particular way.

==== Proposal for repeal ====
In 1985, the Law Commission said that this offence was no longer used and recommended that it be repealed.

In 1981, they said that in relation to cemeteries and crematoria managed by local authorities, this offence was effectively superseded by articles 18 and 19 of the Local Authorities' Cemeteries Order 1977 (SI 1977/204), made under section 214 of the Local Government Act 1972. They also said that there was a considerable overlap with the offence in section 2 of the Ecclesiastical Courts Jurisdiction Act 1860.

== Subsequent developments ==
The preamble to the act was repealed by section 1 of, and the first schedule to, the Statute Law Revision Act 1894 (57 & 58 Vict. c. 54), which came into force on 25 August 1894.

Section 11 of the act was repealed by section 13(1) of, and the second schedule to, the Births and Deaths Registration Act 1926 (16 & 17 Geo. 5. c. 48), which came into force on 1 July 1927.
