= Pretty v United Kingdom =

2002 European Court of Human Rights case

- Court: European Court of Human Rights
- Citation: [2002] ECHR 427

Keywords
- End of Life Decisions [EOLD]

Pretty v. United Kingdom (2346/02) was a case decided by European Court of Human Rights in 2002.

== Facts ==
Diane Pretty was suffering from motor neurone disease and was paralysed from the neck down, had little decipherable speech and was fed by a tube. It is not a crime to kill oneself under English law, but the applicant was prevented by her disease from taking such a step without assistance. It is however a crime to assist another to kill themselves (section 2(1) of the Suicide Act 1961).

Pretty wanted her husband to provide her with assistance in suicide. Because giving this assistance would expose the husband to liability, the Director of Public Prosecutions was asked to agree not to prosecute her husband. This request was refused, as was Pretty's appeal before the Law Lords.

== Judgment ==
In a unanimous judgment, the Court, composed of seven judges, found Pretty's application under articles 2, 3, 8, 9 and 14 of the European Convention on Human Rights admissible, but found no violation of the Convention.

Significant conclusions include that "no right to die, whether at the hands of a third person or with the assistance of a public authority, can be derived from Article 2 of the Convention". As concerns Pretty's right to respect for private life under Article 8, the Court considered that the interference in this case may be justified as "necessary in a democratic society" for the protection of the rights of others.
