= Members of the South Australian House of Assembly, 2026–2030 =

This is a list of members of the South Australian House of Assembly of the 56th Parliament of South Australia. They were elected at the 2026 state election.

== Members ==
Members of the South Australian House of Assembly, 2026–2030
| Portrait | Member | Party | Electorate | Years in office | Ref |
|---|---|---|---|---|---|
| | James Agness (born ?) | Labor | Light | 2026–current | |
| | Sarah Andrews (born ?) | Labor | Gibson | 2022–current | |
| | Jack Batty (born 1990) | Liberal | Bragg | 2022–current | |
| | Lawrence Ben (born ?) | Labor | Enfield | 2026–current | |
| Zoe | Zoe Bettison (born ?) | Labor | Ramsay | 2012–current | |
| | Aria Bolkus (born ?) | Labor | Colton | 2026–current | |
| | Blair Boyer (born 1981) | Labor | Wright | 2018–current | |
| Geoff Brock | Geoff Brock (born 1950) | Independent | Stuart | 2009–present (Note: Served as the member for Frome from 2009–2022.) | |
| Michael Brown | Michael Brown (born ?) | Labor | Florey | 2018–current (Note: Served as the member for Playford from 2018–2022.) | |
| | Nick Champion (born 1972) | Labor | Taylor | 2022–current | |
| Nadia Clancy | Nadia Clancy (born ?) | Labor | Elder | 2022–current | |
| Nat Cook | Nat Cook (born ?) | Labor | Hurtle Vale | 2014–current (Note: Served as the member for Fisher from 2014–2018.) | |
| | Alex Dighton (born ?) | Labor | Black | 2024–current | |
| | Travis Fatchen (born 1972) | Independent | Mount Gambier | 2026–current | |
| Katrine Hildyard | Katrine Hildyard (born 1970) | Labor | Reynell | 2014–current | |
| Lucy Hood | Lucy Hood (born 1985) | Labor | Adelaide | 2022–current | |
| Eddie Hughes | Eddie Hughes (born ?) | Labor | Giles | 2014–current | |
| Tom Koutsantonis | Tom Koutsantonis (born 1971) | Labor | West Torrens | 1997–current (Note: Served as the member for Peake from 1997–2002.) | |
| | Peter Malinauskas (born 1980) | Labor | Croydon | 2018–present (Note: Previously served as a member of the Legislative Council from 2015–2018.) | |
| | Matthew Marozzi (born 1986 or 1987) | Labor | Morialta | 2026–present | |
| | Jenni Mitton (born ?) | Labor | Mawson | 2026–present | |
| Cressida O'Hanlon | Cressida O'Hanlon (born 1972) | Labor | Dunstan | 2024–present | |
| John Fulbrook | John Fulbrook (born ?) | Labor | Playford | 2022–present | |
| Ashton Hurn | Ashton Hurn (born 1991) | Liberal | Schubert | 2022–present | |
| Catherine Hutchesson | Catherine Hutchesson (born ?) | Labor | Waite | 2022–present | |
| | Lou Nicholson (born ?) | Independent | Finniss | 2026–present | |
| | David Paton (born ?) | One Nation | Ngadjuri | 2026–present | |
| Rhiannon Pearce | Rhiannon Pearce (born ?) | Labor | King | 2022–present | |
| | Chris Picton (born 1983) | Labor | Kaurna | 2014–present | |
| Toby Priest | Toby Priest (born 1974 or 1975) | Labor | Morphett | 2026–present | |
| | Cheyne Rich (born ?) | Labor | Port Adelaide | 2026–present | |
| | Jenn Roberts (born ?) | Labor | Hartley | 2026–present | |
| Alice Rolls | Alice Rolls (born 1978 or 1979) | Labor | Unley | 2026–present | |
| | Robert Roylance (born ?) | One Nation | Hammond | 2026–present | |
| | Olivia Savvas (born 1996) | Labor | Newland | 2022–present | |
| Matt Schultz | Matt Schultz (born ?) | Independent | Kavel | 2026–present | |
| | Ella Shaw (born ?) | Labor | Elizabeth | 2026–present | |
| | Meagan Spencer (born ?) | Labor | Torrens | 2026–present | |
| | Jayne Stinson (born ?) | Labor | Badcoe | 2018–present | |
| Joe Szakacs | Joe Szakacs (born ?) | Labor | Cheltenham | 2019–present | |
| | Josh Teague (born 1975) | Liberal | Heysen | 2018–present | |
| | Sam Telfer (born 1985) | Liberal | Flinders | 2022–present | |
| | Chantelle Thomas (born 1995 or 1996) | One Nation | Narungga | 2026–present | |
| | Erin Thompson (born ?) | Labor | Davenport | 2022–present | |
| | Jason Virgo (born ?) | One Nation | MacKillop | 2026–present | |
| Tim Whetstone | Tim Whetstone (born 1960) | Liberal | Chaffey | 2010–present | |
| | David Wilkins (born ?) | Labor | Lee | 2026–present | |

== See also ==
- Members of the South Australian Legislative Council, 2026–2030
