= Second Malinauskas ministry =

75th ministry of government of South Australia

- 75th ministry of South Australia
- Incumbent
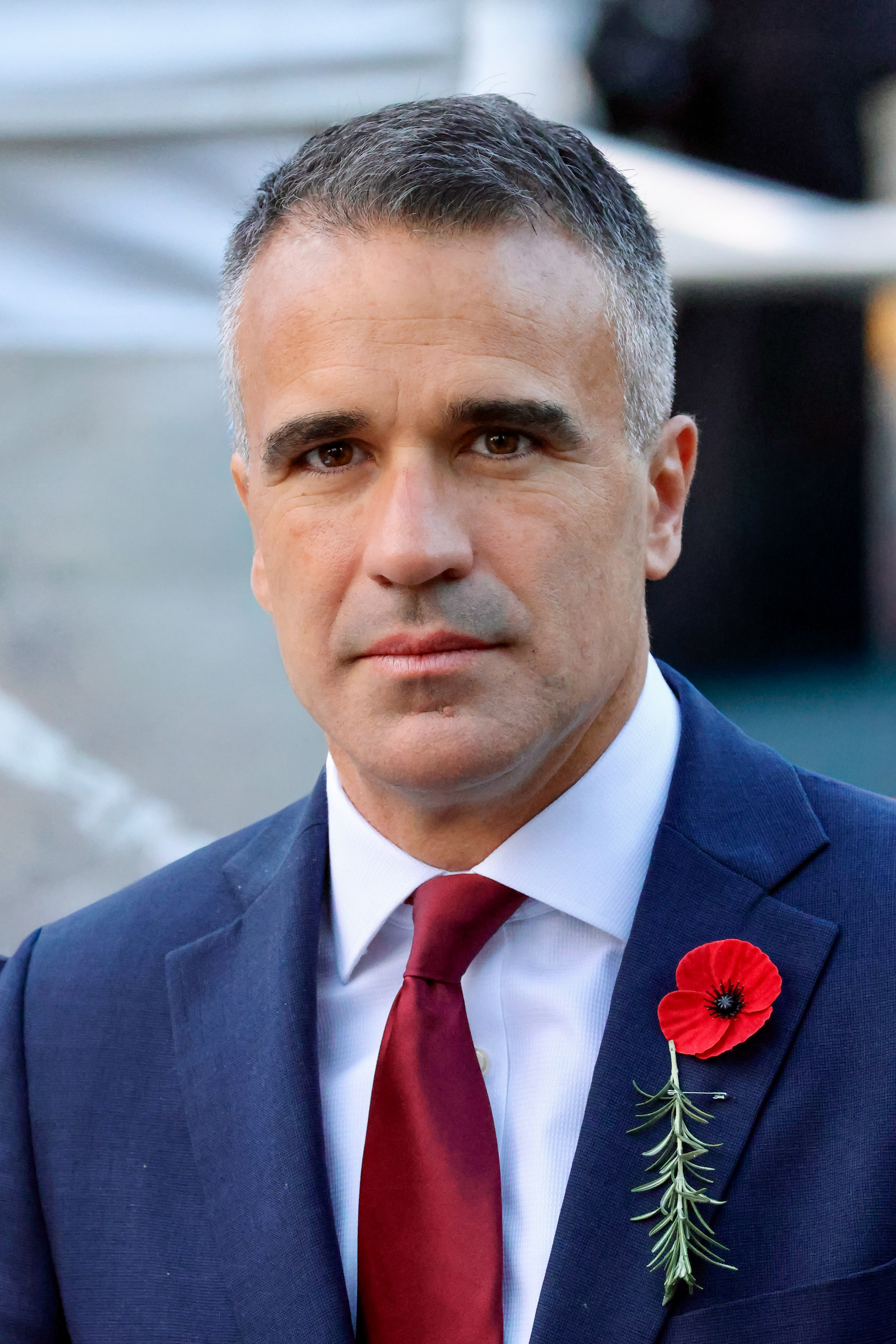
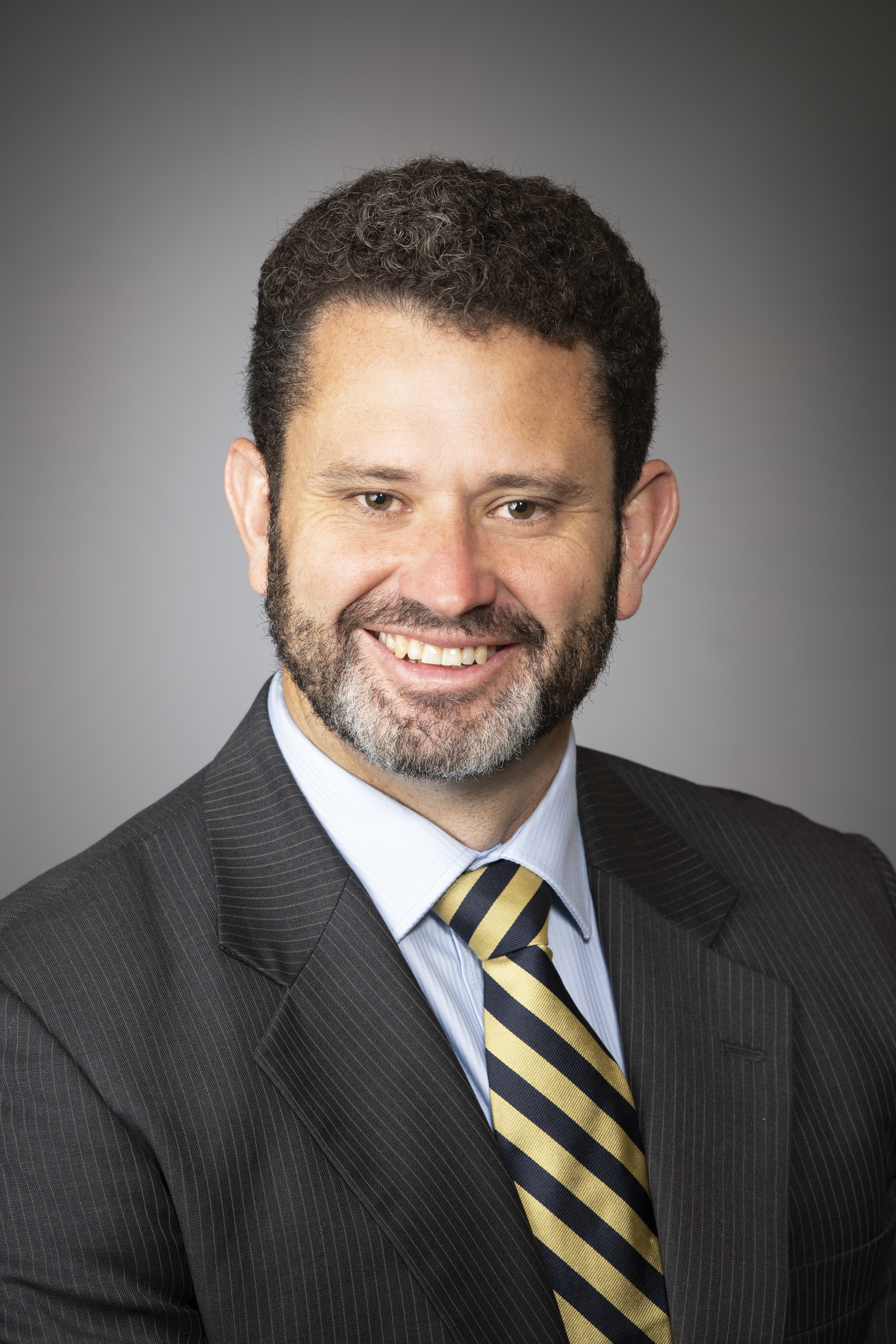
- Peter Malinauskas Kyam Maher
- Date formed: 25 March 2026

People and organisations
- Monarch: Charles III
- Governor: Frances Adamson
- Premier: Peter Malinauskas
- Deputy premier: Kyam Maher
- No. of ministers: 15
- Member party: Labor
- Status in legislature: Majority government
- Opposition party: Liberal
- Opposition leader: Ashton Hurn

History
- Election: 21 March 2026
- Predecessor: First Malinauskas ministry

The Second Malinauskas ministry is the 75th and current ministry (cabinet) of the Government of South Australia, led by Peter Malinauskas of the South Australian Labor Party. It was formed after Labor's landslide victory at the 2026 state election and succeeds the First Malinauskas ministry.

== Original formation ==
The final iteration of the First Malinauskas ministry was sworn in on 18 September 2025 and assumed a caretaker role on 21 February 2026. On the swearing in of the 75th ministry, the following changes to the composition of the ministry were made:

- Nat Cook and Zoe Bettison were not re-appointed to the ministry. They were instead designated legislative presiding officer roles of Speaker and Deputy Speaker respectively.
- Michael Brown and Nadia Clancy were promoted to the cabinet after previously serving as assistant ministers.
- Alice Rolls and Lawrence Ben were appointed to the ministry after being first elected at the 2026 election. Sarah Andrews was also appointed to the ministry for the first time.
- Andrea Michaels served in the previous ministry but retired at the election.

=== Changes to portfolios ===
There were also several changes to portfolios compared to the First Malinauskas ministry:

- Chris Picton lost the portfolio of Health and Wellbeing, and gained State Development, Artificial Intelligence and Digital Economy, Defence and Space Industries and Veterens' Affairs.
- Peter Malinauskas dropped the Defence and Space Industries ministry, and no longer holds any portfolios in addition to Premier.
- Kyam Maher took on the additional portfolio of Arts, and lost the Public Sector ministry.
- Tom Koutsantonis was made Minister for Public Sector in addition to his existing portfolios.
- Katrine Hildyard was made Minister for Human Services and Minister for Seniors and Ageing Well, and lost her portfolios of Child Protection and Domestic, Family and Sexual Violence. She remained Minister for Women.
- Blair Boyer was made Minister for Health and Wellbeing, having previously served as Minister for Education, Training and Skills, and Minister for Police.
- Joe Szakacs lost his portfolios of Trade and Investment, Industry, Innovation and Science, Local Government and Veterens' Affairs, and was given the Infrastructure and Transport ministry.
- Emily Bourke was made Minister for Climate, Environment and Water and Minister for Tourism, losing the portfolios of Infrastructure and Transport and Autism.
- Rhiannon Pearce lost the portfolio of Correctional Services, gained Local Government, and remained Minister for Recreation, Sport and Racing.
- Lucy Hood became Minister for Education, Training and Skills, Minister for Autism, and Minister for the City of Adelaide. She previously held the Climate, Environment and Water portfolio.
- Michael Brown was promoted as Minister for Police, Minister for Correctional Services, and Minister for Consumer and Business Affairs. He retained no assistant ministries.
- Nadia Clancy previously served as an assistant minister and was promoted to the full portfolios of Small and Family Business and Multicultural Affairs.
- Alice Rolls was given the portfolios of Child Protection and Domestic, Family and Sexual Violence.

| Party | Faction | Portfolio | Minister |
|---|---|---|---|
| Labor | Right | Premier | Peter Malinauskas MP |
| Labor | Left | Deputy Premier; Attorney-General; Minister for Aboriginal Affairs; Minister for Industrial Relations; Minister for Arts; Special Minister of State; Leader of the Government in the Legislative Council | Kyam Maher MLC |
| Labor | Right | Treasurer; Minister for Energy and Mining; Minister for Public Sector; Leader of Government Business in the House of Assembly | Tom Koutsantonis MP |
| Labor | Right | Minister for State Development; Minister for Artificial Intelligence and Digital Economy; Minister for Defence and Space Industries; Minister for Veterans' Affairs | Chris Picton MP |
| Labor | Left | Minister for Human Services; Minister for Seniors and Ageing Well; Minister for Women | Katrine Hildyard MP |
| Labor | Right | Minister for Primary Industries and Regional Development; Minister for Forest Industries | Clare Scriven MLC |
| Labor | Left | Minister for Health and Wellbeing | Blair Boyer MP |
| Labor | Left | Minister for Infrastructure and Transport | Joe Szakacs MP |
| Labor | Right | Minister for Housing and Urban Development; Minister for Housing Infrastructure; Minister for Planning | Nick Champion MP |
| Labor | Right | Minister for Climate, Environment and Water; Minister for Tourism | Emily Bourke MLC |
| Labor | Left | Minister for Emergency Services; Minister for Local Government; Minister for Recreation, Sport and Racing | Rhiannon Pearce MP |
| Labor | Right | Minister for Education, Training and Skills; Minister for Autism; Minister for the City of Adelaide | Lucy Hood MP |
| Labor | Right | Minister for Police; Minister for Correctional Services; Minister for Consumer and Business Affairs | Michael Brown MP |
| Labor | Left | Minister for Small and Family Business; Minister for Multicultural Affairs | Nadia Clancy MP |
| Labor | Right | Minister for Child Protection; Minister for Domestic, Family and Sexual Violence | Alice Rolls MP |

=== Assistant Ministers ===
- Lawrence Ben MP | Assistant Minister for Copper, Steel, Critical Metals and Minerals
- Sarah Andrews MP | Assistant Minister for Arts

== See also ==
- First Malinauskas ministry
