= Malinauskas shadow ministry =

The shadow ministry of Peter Malinauskas was the Labor Party opposition from April 2018 to March 2022, opposing the Marshall government of the Liberal Party in the Parliament of South Australia. It was led by Peter Malinauskas following his election as party leader and leader of the opposition on 9 April 2018 until the 2022 state election. The deputy leader of the shadow ministry during this period was Susan Close.

The shadow ministry transitioned to the Malinauskas ministry following Labor's victory at the 2022 state election.

== Shadow cabinet ==
The below was the latest Malinauskas shadow ministry, announced on 8 April 2021, prior to the 2022 state election.

Officeholder	Office(s)
Peter Malinauskas MP	Leader of the Opposition; Shadow Minister for Defence and Space Industries; Shadow Minister for Jobs
Susan Close MP	Deputy Leader of the Opposition; Shadow Minister for Environment and Water; Shadow Minister for Climate Change; Shadow Minister for Industry and Higher Education
Kyam Maher MLC	Shadow Attorney-General; Shadow Minister for Industrial Relations and Public Sector; Shadow Minister for Aboriginal Affairs; Leader of the Opposition in the Legislative Council
Tom Koutsantonis MP	Shadow Minister for Infrastructure and Transport; Shadow Minister for Mining and Energy; Shadow Minister for Government Accountability; Leader of Opposition Business in the House of Assembly
Stephen Mullighan MP	Shadow Treasurer
Zoe Bettison MP	Shadow Minister for Trade, Tourism and Investment; Shadow Minister for Multicultural Affairs
Chris Picton MP	Shadow Minister for Health and Wellbeing
Katrine Hildyard MP	Shadow Minister for Child Protection; Shadow Minister for Women and the Prevention of Domestic and Family Violence; Shadow Minister for Recreation, Sport and Racing; Shadow Minister for Arts
Lee Odenwalder MP	Shadow Minister for Police and Road Safety; Shadow Minister for Emergency Services; Shadow Minister for Correctional Services
Nat Cook MP	Shadow Minister for Human Services
Clare Scriven MLC	Shadow Minister for Primary Industries and Regional Development; Shadow Minister for Forestry; Deputy Leader of the Opposition in the Legislative Council
Blair Boyer MP	Shadow Minister for Education; Shadow Minister for Training and Skills; Shadow Minister for Veterans' Affairs
Andrea Michaels MP	Shadow Minister for Small and Family Business; Shadow Minister for Consumer and Business Affairs; Shadow Minister for Planning and Urban Development; Shadow Minister for Housing
Emily Bourke MLC	Shadow Minister for Local Government; Shadow Minister for the City of Adelaide

== See also ==
- 2022 South Australian state election
- Marshall ministry
- Malinauskas ministry
