= First Malinauskas ministry =

74th ministry of government of South Australia

- 74th ministry of South Australia

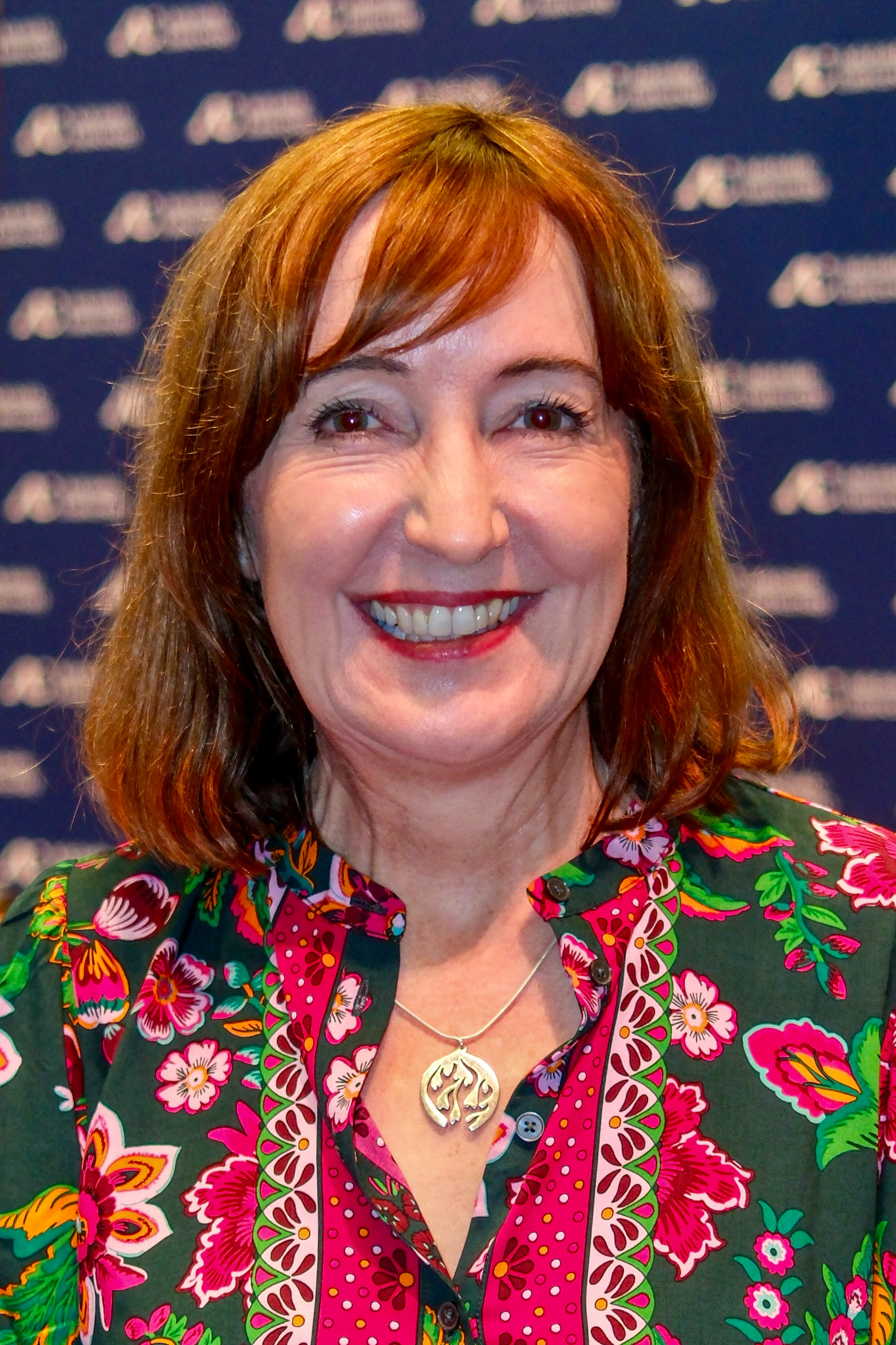
- Peter Malinauskas Susan Close
- Date formed: 21 March 2022
- Date dissolved: 25 March 2026

People and organisations
- Monarch: Elizabeth II; Charles III
- Governor: Frances Adamson
- Premier: Peter Malinauskas
- Deputy premier: Susan Close; Kyam Maher
- No. of ministers: 15
- Member party: Labor/Independents
- Status in legislature: Majority government
- Opposition party: Liberal
- Opposition leader: Steven Marshall; David Speirs; Vincent Tarzia; Ashton Hurn

History
- Election: 19 March 2022
- Outgoing election: 21 March 2026
- Predecessor: Marshall ministry
- Successor: Second Malinauskas ministry

The First Malinauskas ministry was the 74th ministry (cabinet) of the Government of South Australia, led by Peter Malinauskas of the South Australian Labor Party. It was formed after Labor's victory at the 2022 state election succeeding the Marshall ministry.

The ministry was initially made up of 14 members of the Labor Party and 1 independent member, Geoff Brock, who was previously also a minister at the Weatherill Labor ministry. Following Brock's resignation from cabinet in 2024, Independent MP Dan Cregan resigned as Speaker and joined the ministry. Cregan resigned from cabinet in order to retire from politics in 2025. The final ministry was made up of 15 Labor members, with a majority (8) being female. The ministry, according to Malinauskas himself, was centrist.

== Final formation ==
On 18 September 2025, Deputy Premier Susan Close and Treasurer Stephen Mullighan both resigned from the ministry in anticipation of their respective retirements from parliament at the upcoming election. Leader of the Government in the Legislative Council Kyam Maher was appointed Deputy Premier, and Tom Koutsantonis took on the role of Treasurer, a position he previously held in the Weatherill ministry between 2014 and 2018.

The following changes were also made to the ministry:

- Lucy Hood was added to the ministry, appointed as Minister for Climate, Environment and Water
- Rhiannon Pearce was promoted to the ministry as Minister for Emergency Services and Correctional Services, and Minister for Recreation, Sport and Racing. She had served as an Assistant Minister since 2022.
- Emily Bourke took the role of Minister for Infrastructure and Transport, and remained Minister for Autism.
- Nadia Clancy was appointed as Assistant Minister for Mental Health and Suicide Prevention.
- Peter Malinauskas added Minister for Defence and Space Industries to his position of Premier.
- Michael Brown expanded his role as Assistant Minister to include Space Industries.

Party	Portfolio	Minister
Labor	Premier; Minister for Defence and Space Industries	Peter Malinauskas MP
Labor	Deputy Premier; Minister for Aboriginal Affairs; Attorney-General; Minister for Industrial Relations and Public Sector; Special Minister of State; Leader of the Government in the Legislative Council	Kyam Maher MLC
Labor	Treasurer; Minister for Energy and Mining; Leader of Government Business in the House of Assembly	Tom Koutsantonis MP
Labor	Minister for Tourism; Minister for Multicultural Affairs	Zoe Bettison MP
Labor	Minister for Health and Wellbeing	Chris Picton MP
Labor	Minister for Child Protection; Minister for Domestic, Family and Sexual Violence; Minister for Women	Katrine Hildyard MP
Labor	Minister for Human Services; Minister for Seniors and Ageing Well	Nat Cook MP
Labor	Minister for Primary Industries and Regional Development; Minister for Forest Industries	Clare Scriven MLC
Labor	Minister for Education, Training and Skills; Minister for Police	Blair Boyer MP
Labor	Minister for Small and Family Business; Minister for Consumer and Business Affairs; Minister for Arts	Andrea Michaels MP
Labor	Minister for Trade and Investment; Minister for Industry, Innovation and Science; Minister for Local Government; Minister for Veteran's Affairs	Joe Szakacs MP
Labor	Minister for Housing and Urban Development; Minister for Housing Infrastructure; Minister for Planning	Nick Champion MP
Labor	Minister for Infrastructure and Transport; Minister for Autism	Emily Bourke MLC
Labor	Minister for Emergency Service and Correctional Services; Minister for Recreation, Sport and Racing	Rhiannon Pearce MP
Labor	Minister for Climate, Environment and Water	Lucy Hood MP

=== Assistant Ministers ===
- Michael Brown MP | Assistant Minister for Artificial Intelligence, Digital Economy, Defence and Space Industries
- Nadia Clancy MP | Assistant Minister for Mental Health and Suicide Prevention

== Third formation ==
On 29 January 2025, Premier Malinauskas made several changes to the ministry following the resignation of Dan Cregan, who had served as Minister for Police, Emergency Services and Correctional Services and Special Minister of State for approximately nine months. Cregan's portfolios were divided among ministers Stephen Mullighan (Police), Kyam Maher (Special Minister of State) and Emily Bourke (Emergency Services and Correctional Services). Bourke had been elevated to the full ministry after serving as an assistant minister since 2022.

The following changes were also made to the ministry:

- Emily Bourke was appointed Minister for Recreation, Sport and Racing and Minister for Autism in addition to Emergency Services and Correctional Services.
- Katrine Hildyard lost responsibility for Recreation, Sport and Racing but remained Minister for Women and Minister for the Prevention of Domestic, Family and Sexual Violence.
- Michael Brown was appointed Assistant Minister to the Premier for Artificial Intelligence and Digital Economy.

Party	Portfolio	Minister
Labor	Premier	Peter Malinauskas MP
Labor	Deputy Premier; Minister for Industry, Innovation and Science; Minister for Workforce and Population Strategy; Minister for Climate, Environment and Water	Susan Close MP
Labor	Attorney-General; Minister for Aboriginal Affairs; Minister for Industrial Relations and Public Sector; Special Minister of State; Leader of the Government in the Legislative Council	Kyam Maher MLC
Labor	Minister for Infrastructure and Transport; Minister for Energy and Mining; Leader of Government Business in the House of Assembly	Tom Koutsantonis MP
Labor	Treasurer; Minister for Police	Stephen Mullighan MP
Labor	Minister for Tourism; Minister for Multicultural Affairs	Zoe Bettison MP
Labor	Minister for Health and Wellbeing	Chris Picton MP
Labor	Minister for Child Protection; Minister for Women and the Prevention of Domestic and Family Violence	Katrine Hildyard MP
Labor	Minister for Human Services; Minister for Ageing Well	Nat Cook MP
Labor	Minister for Primary Industries and Regional Development; Minister for Forest Industries	Clare Scriven MLC
Labor	Minister for Education, Training and Skills	Blair Boyer MP
Labor	Minister for Small and Family Business; Minister for Consumer and Business Affairs; Minister for Arts	Andrea Michaels MP
Labor	Minister for Trade and Investment; Minister for Local Government; Minister for Veteran's Affairs	Joe Szakacs MP
Labor	Minister for Housing and Urban Development; Minister for Housing Infrastructure; Minister for Planning	Nick Champion MP
Labor	Minister for Emergency Services and Correctional Services; Minister for Recreation, Sport and Racing; Minister for Autism	Emily Bourke MLC

=== Assistant Ministers ===
- Rhiannon Pearce MP | Assistant Minister to the Deputy Premier
- Michael Brown | Assistant Minister to the Premier for Artificial Intelligence and Digital Economy

== Second formation ==
In April 2024, Independent member for Stuart and Minister for Local Government, Regional Roads and Veterans Affairs, Geoff Brock, resigned from cabinet. Independent former Liberal member for Kavel, Dan Cregan, resigned his position of Speaker of the South Australian House of Assembly and joined the ministry. Cregan assumed the role of Minister for Police, Emergency Services, and Correctional Services, as well as Special Minister of State.

The following changes were also made to the ministry:

- Stephen Mullighan remained as Treasurer and was granted the role of Minister for Defence and Space Industries.
- Nat Cook retained her role as Minister for Human Services and additionally became Minister for Seniors and Ageing Well.
- Joe Szakacs assumed responsibility for Trade and Investment, Local Government, and Veterans Affairs.
- Tom Koutsantonis expanded his portfolio to include Regional Roads alongside Infrastructure and Transport.
- Rhiannon Pearce became Assistant Minister for Junior Sport Participation.

Party	Portfolio	Minister
Labor	Premier	Peter Malinauskas MP
Labor	Deputy Premier; Minister for Industry, Innovation and Science; Minister for Workforce and Population Strategy; Minister for Climate, Environment and Water	Susan Close MP
Labor	Attorney-General; Minister for Aboriginal Affairs; Minister for Industrial Relations and Public Sector; Leader of the Government in the Legislative Council	Kyam Maher MLC
Labor	Minister for Infrastructure and Transport; Minister for Energy and Mining; Leader of Government Business in the House of Assembly	Tom Koutsantonis MP
Labor	Treasurer	Stephen Mullighan MP
Labor	Minister for Tourism; Minister for Multicultural Affairs	Zoe Bettison MP
Labor	Minister for Health and Wellbeing	Chris Picton MP
Labor	Minister for Child Protection; Minister for Women and the Prevention of Domestic and Family Violence; Minister for Recreation, Sport and Racing	Katrine Hildyard MP
Labor	Minister for Human Services; Minister for Ageing Well	Nat Cook MP
Labor	Minister for Primary Industries and Regional Development; Minister for Forest Industries	Clare Scriven MLC
Labor	Minister for Education, Training and Skills	Blair Boyer MP
Labor	Minister for Small and Family Business; Minister for Consumer and Business Affairs; Minister for Arts	Andrea Michaels MP
Labor	Minister for Trade and Investment; Minister for Local Government; Minister for Veteran's Affairs	Joe Szakacs MP
Labor	Minister for Housing and Urban Development; Minister for Housing Infrastructure; Minister for Planning	Nick Champion MP
Independent	Minister for Police, Emergency Services and Correctional Services; Special Minister of State	Dan Cregan MP

=== Assistant Ministers ===
- Emily Bourke MLC | Assistant Minister to the Premier
- Rhiannon Pearce MP | Assistant Minister to the Deputy Premier

== First formation ==
The ministry commenced on 21 March 2022, with Malinauskas, deputy party leader Susan Close and Stephen Mullighan sworn in as a three-member ministry. Malinauskas was sworn in to cover other ministerial portfolios on an acting basis until the rest of the ministry was announced and sworn in on 24 March 2022.

The ministry evolved largely from Malinauskas' shadow ministry before the election. Nick Champion, Joe Szakacs and independent Geoff Brock were new additions to the frontbench, while Emily Bourke was appointed as an Assistant Minister instead and Lee Odenwalder was dropped from the frontbench completely.

The portfolios that Malinauskas held on an acting basis between 21 and 24 March 2022 are not listed below.

Party	Minister	Portfolio	Image
Labor	Peter Malinauskas MP	Premier	
Labor	Susan Close MP	Deputy Premier; Minister for Climate, Environment and Water	
Labor	Susan Close MP	Minister for Industry, Innovation and Science; Minister for Defence and Space Industries	
Labor	Kyam Maher MLC	Attorney-General; Minister for Aboriginal Affairs; Minister for Industrial Relations and Public Sector; Leader of the Government in the Legislative Council	
Labor	Tom Koutsantonis MP	Minister for Infrastructure and Transport; Minister for Energy and Mining; Leader of Government Business in the House of Assembly	
Labor	Stephen Mullighan MP	Treasurer	
Labor	Zoe Bettison MP	Minister for Tourism; Minister for Multicultural Affairs	
Labor	Chris Picton MP	Minister for Health and Wellbeing	
Labor	Katrine Hildyard MP	Minister for Child Protection; Minister for Women and the Prevention of Domestic and Family Violence; Minister for Recreation, Sport and Racing	
Labor	Nat Cook MP	Minister for Human Services	
Labor	Clare Scriven MLC	Minister for Primary Industries and Regional Development; Minister for Forest Industries	
Labor	Blair Boyer MP	Minister for Education, Training and Skills	
Independent	Geoff Brock MP	Minister for Local Government; Minister for Regional Roads; Minister for Veterans Affairs	
Labor	Andrea Michaels MP	Minister for Small and Family Business; Minister for Consumer and Business Affairs; Minister for Arts	
Labor	Joe Szakacs MP	Minister for Police, Emergency Services and Correctional Services	
Labor	Nick Champion MP	Minister for Trade and Investment; Minister for Housing and Urban Development; Minister for Planning	

=== Assistant Ministers ===
- Emily Bourke MLC | Assistant Minister to the Premier
- Rhiannon Pearce MP | Assistant Minister to the Deputy Premier

== See also ==
- Shadow ministry of Peter Malinauskas
- Speirs shadow ministry
- Tarzia shadow ministry
