= Cabinet of South Australia =

South Australian executive government

Cabinet of the State of South Australia
- Royal Arms of South Australia

Cabinet overview
- Formed: 1856 (170 years ago)
- Type: Committee of the Executive Council
- Jurisdiction: South Australia
- Headquarters: Cabinet Room, 200 Victoria Square, Adelaide
- Ministers responsible: Peter Malinauskas, Premier and Head of Cabinet; Kyam Maher, Deputy Premier
- Cabinet executive: Rick Persse, Chief Executive
- Website: dpc.sa.gov.au

The Cabinet of South Australia is the chief policy-making organ of the Government of South Australia. In South Australia, the cabinet is interchangeably known as the ministry as there is no "outer ministry" – therefore all ministers are in cabinet. The current fifteen-member cabinet, the Malinauskas ministry, is headed by Premier Peter Malinauskas of the South Australian Labor Party.

== Composition of ministry ==
Party	Portfolio	Minister
Labor	Premier	Peter Malinauskas MP
Labor	Deputy Premier; Attorney-General; Minister for Aboriginal Affairs; Minister for Industrial Relations; Minister for Arts; Special Minister of State; Leader of the Government in the Legislative Council	Kyam Maher MLC
Labor	Treasurer; Minister for Energy and Mining; Minister for Public Sector; Leader of Government Business in the House of Assembly	Tom Koutsantonis MP
Labor	Minister for State Development; Minister for Artificial Intelligence and Digital Economy; Minister for Defence and Space Industries; Minister for Veterens' Affairs	Chris Picton MP
Labor	Minister for Human Services; Minister for Seniors and Ageing Well; Minister for Women	Katrine Hildyard MP
Labor	Minister for Primary Industries and Regional Development; Minister for Forest Industries	Clare Scriven MLC
Labor	Minister for Health and Wellbeing	Blair Boyer MP
Labor	Minister for Infrastructure and Transport	Joe Szakacs MP
Labor	Minister for Housing and Urban Development; Minister for Housing Infrastructure; Minister for Planning	Nick Champion MP
Labor	Minister for Climate, Environment and Water; Minister for Tourism	Emily Bourke MLC
Labor	Minister for Emergency Services; Minister for Local Government; Minister for Recreation, Sport and Racing	Rhiannon Pearce MP
Labor	Minister for Education, Training and Skills; Minister for Autism; Minister for the City of Adelaide	Lucy Hood MP
Labor	Minister for Police; Minister for Correctional Services; Minister for Consumer and Business Affairs	Michael Brown MP
Labor	Minister for Small and Family Business; Minister for Multicultural Affairs	Nadia Clancy MP
Labor	Minister for Child Protection; Minister for Domestic, Family and Sexual Violence	Alice Rolls MP

== See also ==
- Malinauskas ministry
- Government of South Australia
- List of South Australian Ministries
