= Government of South Australia =

Australian state government

- Government of the State of South Australia
- State government

Overview
- Established: 22 April 1857; 169 years ago as a responsible colonial government; 1 January 1901; 125 years ago as an Australian state
- State: South Australia
- Country: Australia
- Leader: Premier of South Australia (Peter Malinauskas)
- Appointed by: Governor of South Australia (Frances Adamson) on the advice of the premier
- Main organ: Executive Council of South Australia (de jure); Cabinet of South Australia (de facto)
- Ministries: 15 government departments
- Responsible to: Parliament of South Australia
- Annual budget: ▲$27.5 billion (2023–24)
- Headquarters: State Administration Centre, 200 Victoria Square, Adelaide
- Website: sa.gov.au

The Government of South Australia, also referred to as the South Australian Government or the SA Government, is the executive branch of the state of South Australia. It is modelled on the Westminster system, meaning that the highest ranking members of the executive are drawn from an elected state parliament. Specifically the party or coalition which holds a majority of the House of Assembly (the lower chamber of the South Australian Parliament).

== History ==
South Australia was established via letters patent by King William IV in February of 1836, pursuant to the South Australian Colonisation Act 1834. Governance in the colony was organised according to the principles developed by Edward Wakefield, where settlement would be conducted by free settlers rather than convicts. Therefore governance would be divided between the Governor who was responsible to the British Crown and tasked with the authority to make laws, and Colonisation Commissioners who were responsible for the sale of land to settlers to fund the colony. This structure was found to be troublesome as the commission had control of the funds rather than the Governor, and as a result in 1838, the Governor was appointed Resident Commissioner to resolve conflict.

In 1842 the British Parliament reorganised the structure of South Australia's governance by abolishing the Colonisation Commission and creating a Legislative Council of eight people (including the Governor) to exercise the legislative power of the colony. In 1850 the British Parliament passed the Australian Constitutions Act 1850, which empowered the Legislative Council to alter its own composition. The Legislative Council responded by passing the Constitution Act 1856, which created a bicameral parliament and an executive responsible to it. Boyle Finniss was appointed the first Premier of South Australia as part of an interim executive until elections to the new Parliament could be held in 1857.

The executive comprised ministers selected from the Parliament and the Governor was no longer able to unilaterally make most decisions. The new Parliament and Executive took over almost all of the powers held by the Secretary of State for the Colonies regarding the appointment to official positions in the colony, immigration, and customs matters.

When federation occurred in 1901, South Australia became a state of the Commonwealth of Australia under the Constitution of Australia, which regulates the South Australia's relationship with the Commonwealth. The state ceded certain executive powers (such as defence and customs), but retained powers in all matters not withdrawn from them or in conflict with the Commonwealth.

In 1934, the Constitution Act 1856 was repealed and replaced with the Constitution Act 1934, which remains in force today with amendments.

== Structure ==
South Australia is governed according to the principles of the Westminster system, a form of parliamentary government based on the model of the United Kingdom.

Executive power rests formally with the Executive Council, which consists of the governor and senior ministers. The Governor plays an important practical role under the state's constitution and fulfils a symbolic role as local head of state. The Governor is appointed by the King and, for most practical purposes, exercises His Majesty's powers in the state. These include the fundamental powers to dissolve Parliament, call elections and appoint and dismiss ministers. The Governor in Executive Council is the formal mechanism for administration of the state. Many of the decisions made by Cabinet do not have legal effect until they are signed by the Governor in Executive Council. All items for the approval of the Governor in Executive Council must first be considered by Cabinet, with the exception of the assent to Acts. When exercising a statutory power, the Governor must act with the advice and consent of Executive Council. All ministers are ex officio members of Executive Council.

In practice, executive power is exercised by the premier of South Australia and the Cabinet of South Australia, who advise the Governor. The Cabinet comprises 15 ministers, headed by the Premier, who are either members of the House of Assembly or the Legislative Council. Cabinet is responsible for determining policies which are submitted to Parliament.

== Current ministry ==
| Minister | Portfolio | Party affiliation |
|---|---|---|
| Peter Malinauskas MP | Premier | Labor |
| Kyam Maher MLC | Deputy Premier; Minister for Aboriginal Affairs; Attorney-General; Minister for Industrial Relations; Minister for Arts; Special Minister of State; Leader of Government Business in the Legislative Council | Labor |
| Tom Koutsantonis MP | Treasurer; Minister for Energy and Mining; Minister for Public Sector; Leader of Government Business in the House of Assembly | Labor |
| Chris Picton MP | Minister for State Development; Minister for Artificial Intelligence and Digital Economy; Minister for Defence and Space Industries; Minister for Veterans' Affairs | Labor |
| Katrine Hildyard MP | Minister for Human Services; Minister for Seniors and Ageing Well; Minister for Women | Labor |
| Clare Scriven MLC | Minister for Primary Industries and Regional Development; Minister for Forest Industries | Labor |
| Blair Boyer MP | Minister for Health and Wellbeing | Labor |
| Joe Szakacs MP | Minister for Infrastructure and Transport | Labor |
| Nick Champion MP | Minister for Housing and Urban Development; Minister for Housing Infrastructure; Minister for Planning | Labor |
| Emily Bourke MLC | Minister for Climate, Environment and Water; Minister for Tourism | Labor |
| Rhiannon Pearce MP | Minister for Emergency Services and Correctional Services; Minister for Local Government; Minister for Recreation, Sport and Racing | Labor |
| Lucy Hood MP | Minister for Education, Training and Skills; Minister for Autism; Minister for the City of Adelaide | Labor |
| Michael Brown MP | Minister for Police; Minister for Correctional Services; Minister for Consumer and Business Affairs | Labor |
| Nadia Clancy MP | Minister for Small and Family Business; Minister for Multicultural Affairs | Labor |
| Alice Rolls MP | Minister for Child Protection; Minister for Domestic, Family and Sexual Violence | Labor |
| Lawrence Ben MP | Assistant Minister for Copper, Steel, Critical Metals and Minerals | Labor |
| Sarah Andrews MP | Assistant Minister for Arts | Labor |

== Government agencies ==
The South Australian Government is divided into departments or attached offices to those departments. Departments and their attached offices are overseen by a government minister who is a member of the Parliament. However some departments or attached offices may be afforded a degree of independence by statute and may only be subject to ministerial direction in specific circumstances (for example the Audit Office or the Electoral Commission).

There are currently 21 departments, though not all of them use the word department in their title.

- Attorney-General's Department
- Audit Office of South Australia
- Department for Child Protection
- Department for Correctional Services
- Defence SA
- Department for Education
  - Office for Early Childhood Development
- Electoral Commission of South Australia
- Department for Energy and Mining
  - Office of Hydrogen Power South Australia
  - Office of Northern Water Delivery
- Department for Environment and Water
- Environment Protection Agency (EPA)
- Office of Green Industries SA
- Department of Health and Wellbeing
  - Commission on Excellence and Innovation in Health
  - Preventative Health SA
- Department for Housing and Urban Development
  - SA Housing Trust
- Department of Human Services
- Department for Infrastructure and Transport
  - Office of Recreation, Sport and Racing
- Department of the Premier and Cabinet
  - Office of the Commissioner for Public Sector Employment
  - Premier's Delivery Unit
  - Office of the South Australian Productivity Commission
- Department of Primary Industries and Regions (PIRSA)
- South Australian Police Department
- Department of State Development
- Department of Treasury and Finance
  - Office for Artificial Intelligence
- Office of Venue Management

=== Government business enterprises ===
- South Australian Forestry Corporation trading as ForestrySA
- South Australian Water Corporation trading as SA Water

== Former departments ==
There have been many changes of name and function over the years, with splits or mergers of responsibilities for various services.

=== Services and supply ===
Early departments included:

- 1894–1975: Produce Department
- 1911–1971: Public Stores Department

On 20 April 1972 the Public Stores Department was renamed the State Supply Department. In terms of the Public Supply and Tender Act, the new Department was under the control of the Supply and Tender Board, with the director as the Chief Executive Officer. The function of the Department was to exercise control over the purchase, procurement, care, custody, inspection and stocktaking of all materials and equipment required by all Government departments. It was also responsible for calling Government tenders, arranging contracts for stores, regulating supply procedures, operating Government warehouses and controlling the disposal of surplus, obsolete and expended plant and equipment. In October 1975 the Produce Department was amalgamated with the State Supply Department and became the Produce Division, State Supply Department.

On 1 July 1976 the State Supply Department was amalgamated with the Government Printing Department, the Department of Chemistry, and that part of the Public Service Board known as the Automatic Data Processing Centre to become the Department of Services and Supply (DSS), under the control of the Director-General of Services and Supply. State Supply became a division within the Department of Services and Supply.

On 1 July 1982, the Forensic Services Branch of the Institute of Medical and Veterinary Science (IMVS; now SA Pathology) and the Forensic Chemistry Branch of the Chemistry Division of the Department of Services and Supply amalgamated to form the Forensic Science Centre Division of the Department of Services and Supply, which was based in the Forensic Sciences building in Divett Place, Adelaide CBD.

From 1 July 1988 the Department of Services and Supply became known as the Department of State Services. In May 1989, the Department of Services and Supply changed name to the State Services Department. At this time the divisions of the department became known as business units, and began operating on a cost-recovery basis. The Chemistry Division became the State Chemistry Laboratories. The Forensic Science Centre Division became State Forensic Science.

The Department for Administrative and Information Services (DAIS) superseded the Department for State Government Services (Services SA) on 23 October 1997. DAIS was formed as one of 10 "super departments, as an administrative unit under the Public Sector Management Act 1995. All of the activities of the following administrative units were merged into the new body:

- Department for State Government Services
- Department for Information and Technology Services
- Department for Industrial Affairs (excluding the Human Resources Management Division, which was transferred to the Department of the Premier and Cabinet)
- Land Services Group of the former Department of Environment and Natural Resources
- Forestry Division of the former Department of Primary Industries

At this time, State Forensic Science changed name to Forensic Science SA.

In a restructure of the public service on the 1 October 2006, all employees and/or units of DAIS were transferred to various other departments. Forensic Science SA became part of the Attorney General's Department, and other units also underwent rebranding. State Records became a business unit of the Department of the Premier and Cabinet until 1 July 2015, when it was moved to the Attorney-General's Department.

== See also ==
- First Nations Voice to Parliament (South Australia)
- List of South Australian government agencies
- List of South Australian Ministries
