= Gail Gago =

Australian politician

The Honourable Gail Gago

Member of the South Australian Legislative Council
- In office 9 February 2002 – 17 March 2018

Personal details
- Born: Gail Elizabeth Darveniza; 4 July 1957 (age 69) Mooroopna, Victoria, Australia
- Party: Australian Labor Party (SA)
- Spouse: Peter Gago
- Relations: Kaye Darveniza (sister)
- Education: Monash University
- Occupation: Nurse, union official

Gail Elizabeth Gago (née Darveniza; born 4 July 1957) is an Australian retired politician, and a member of the Labor Party in the South Australian Legislative Council from the 2002 election until her retirement in 2018.

== Background ==
Gago was born in Mooroopna, Victoria, and completed her secondary education at Shepparton High School. After high school, Gago studied at Phillip Institute of Technology and the Austin Hospital where she graduated as a registered nurse, later completing a Bachelor of Science (Honours) at Monash University, majoring in psychology.

In 1987, Gago and her husband Peter moved to South Australia, where she worked as a nurse at Salisbury Private Hospital for two years. In 1988 Gago started working with the Australian Nursing Federation (ANF) for 12 years, first as an organiser, later becoming assistant secretary and branch secretary. As a member of the ANF, Gago was part of many campaigns to improve patient care, access to health services, wages and conditions for workers. She has participated in and contributed to a range of state and federal health and industrial relations forums.

Gago has held membership of the South Australian Branch of the Australian Labor Party since 1991, contributing to policy committees and serving as state convention delegate (proxy), state executive member and national conference attendee. Gago is from the Labor Left faction.

== Parliament ==
Gago was elected to the Legislative Council from first position on the Labor ticket at the 2002 election and from second position on the Labor ticket at the 2010 election. After the resignation from Cabinet of Bernard Finnigan, Gago became acting Leader of the Government in the Legislative Council. She was also the only Minister in the Upper House. On 17 May 2011, the Labor Caucus elected Gago the state's first woman leader of the Legislative Council. Gago was also the state's first female Acting Premier of South Australia.

Following the second term election of the Labor government in March 2006, Gago was appointed Minister for Environment and Conservation, Minister for Mental Health and Substance Abuse and Minister Assisting the Minister for Health. On 24 July 2008, Gago was appointed Minister for State/Local Government Relations, Minister for the Status of Women, Minister for Consumer Affairs, Minister for Government Enterprises and Minister Assisting the Minister for Transport, Infrastructure and Energy. On 8 February 2011, Gago was appointed Minister for Regional Development, Minister for Public Sector Management, Minister for the Status of Women, Minister for Consumer Affairs and Minister for Government Enterprises. On 21 April 2011, Gago was appointed Minister for Gambling. On 21 October 2011, Gago was appointed Minister for Agriculture Food and Fisheries, Minister for Forests, Minister for Regional Development, Minister for Tourism and Minister for the Status of Women. On 21 January 2013, Gago was appointed Minister for Minister for Agriculture, Food and Fisheries, Minister for Forests, Minister for Regional Development, Minister for the Status of Women and Minister for State/Local Government Relations. Following the 2014 election, Gago was appointed Minister for Employment, Higher Education and Skills, Minister for Science and Information Economy, Minister for the Status of Women, and Minister for Business Services and Consumers in the Weatherill Labor cabinet.

Gago announced her resignation from cabinet on 15 January 2016, citing cabinet renewal. Gago also announced that she would be retiring from parliament as of the 2018 election.

== Personal life ==
Gago is married to Penfolds chief winemaker Peter Gago. She is also the sister of former Victorian state Labor member Kaye Darveniza.

An advocate for healthy living, Gago's interests include bushwalking and running.

Parliament of South Australia
| Preceded by Trevor Crothers; Legh Davis; Trevor Griffin; Jamie Irwin; Carolyn Pickles | Member of the South Australian Legislative Council; 2002–present Served alongside: Multiple Members | Incumbent |
Political offices
| Preceded by Jennifer Rankine | Minister for the Status of Women; 2008–2016 | Succeeded by Zoe Bettison |
| Preceded by Jennifer Rankine | Minister for State / Local Government Relations; 2008–2011 | Succeeded by Bernard Finnigan |
| Preceded by Bernard Finnigan | Minister for Gambling; 2008–2011 | Succeeded by Ian Hunter as Minister for Social Inclusion |
| Preceded by Jane Lomax-Smith | Minister for City of Adelaide; 2010–2011 | Succeeded by John Rau as Minister for Urban Development, Planning and the City of Adelaide |
| Preceded by Mike Rann as Premier of South Australia | Minister for Public Sector Management; 2011 | Succeeded by Michael O'Brien as Minister for the Public Sector |
| Preceded by John Rau | Minister for Tourism; 2011–2013 | Succeeded by Leon Bignell |
| Preceded by Michael O'Brien | Minister for Agriculture, Food and Fisheries; 2011–2014 | Succeeded by Leon Bignell |
| Preceded by Michael O'Brien | Minister for Forests; 2011 – 2014 | Succeeded by Leon Bignell |
| Preceded by Michael O'Brien | Minister for Regional Development; 2011–2014 | Succeeded by Geoff Brock |
| Preceded by Bernard Finnigan | Leader of the Government in the South Australian Legislative Council; 2011–2016 | Succeeded by Kyam Maher |
| Preceded by Russell Wortley | Minister for State / Local Government Relations; 2013–2014 | Succeeded by Geoff Brock as Minister for Local Government |
| Preceded by Grace Portolesi | Minister for Employment, Higher Education and Skills; 2014–2016 | Succeeded by Kyam Maher as Minister for Employment |
| Preceded by Grace Portolesi | Minister for Employment, Higher Education and Skills; 2014–2016 | Succeeded by Susan Close as Minister for Higher Education and Skills |
| Preceded by Grace Portolesi | Minister for Science and Information Economy; 2014–2016 | Succeeded by Kyam Maher |
| Preceded by John Rau | Minister for Business Services and Consumers; 2014–2016 | Succeeded by John Rau as Minister for Consumer and Business Services |
