= Malinauskas ministry =

Malinauskas ministry may refer to one of the following government ministries (cabinets) under premier Peter Malinauskas in the South Australian Parliament:

- First Malinauskas ministry (March 2022 – March 2025)
- Second Malinauskas ministry (March 2026 – present)
