= Jack Snelling =

Australian politician (born 1972)

The Honourable Jack Snelling
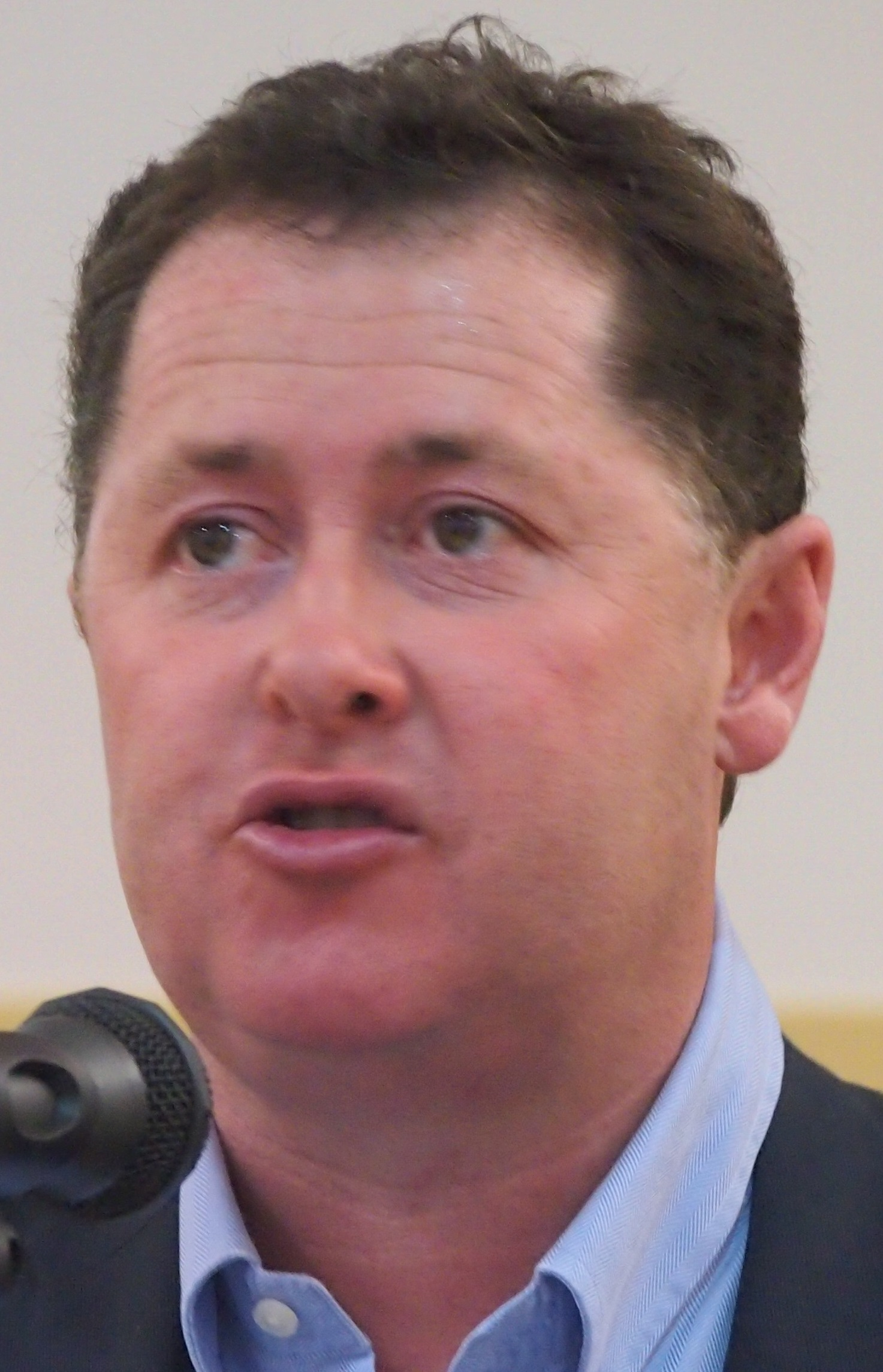
- Snelling in 2016

47th Treasurer of South Australia
- In office 8 February 2011 – 21 January 2013
- Premier: Mike Rann; Jay Weatherill
- Preceded by: Kevin Foley
- Succeeded by: Jay Weatherill

32nd Speaker of the South Australian House of Assembly
- In office 27 April 2006 – 25 March 2010
- Preceded by: Bob Such
- Succeeded by: Lyn Breuer

Member of the South Australian House of Assembly for Playford
- In office 11 October 1997 – 17 March 2018
- Preceded by: John Quirke
- Succeeded by: Michael Brown

Personal details
- Born: John James Snelling; 8 November 1972 (age 53) North Adelaide, South Australia, Australia
- Party: Family First (since 2021)
- Other political affiliations: Labor (until 2021)
- Spouse: Lucia
- Children: 6

John James Snelling (born 8 November 1972) is an Australian former politician. He was the Labor member for the South Australian House of Assembly seat of Playford from the 1997 election until his retirement in 2018. Snelling left the Labor Party in 2021 to found the Family First Party.

== Background ==
Prior to his election into politics, Snelling was an electoral officer, and a staffer in the Shop, Distributive and Allied Employees Association (SDA). Snelling was a supporter of the work of Christopher Pearson.

== Parliament ==
Entering parliament in 1997 at the age of 24, he was the youngest member of the House of Assembly at the time. He was Speaker of the South Australian House of Assembly for the Rann Labor government from 2006 to 2010. He also served as Deputy Speaker and Chairman of Committees. He is aligned with Labor's right faction.

A consequence of the major 2016 electoral redistribution was that two thirds of the voters in Snelling's electorate of Playford will be moved to Florey. On 15 March 2017 he won Labor preselection to be the candidate for Florey at the 2018 election. The incumbent member for Florey, Frances Bedford, had also nominated for pre-selection. On 28 March 2017, Bedford resigned from the party after they endorsed Snelling for the seat. A ReachTEL poll conducted on 2 March 2017 of 606 voters in post-redistribution Florey indicated a 33.4 percent primary vote for Bedford running as an independent which would likely see Snelling defeated after preferences. Snelling withdrew from the pre-selection on 17 September 2017.

=== Cabinet ===
After the 2010 election, Snelling was appointed as the Minister for Employment, Training and Further Education, Science, Information Economy, Veterans Affairs and Road Safety.

Following the parliamentary resignation of Kevin Foley, Snelling was sworn in as the Treasurer of South Australia on 8 February 2011.

Once the ALP had retained power (though dependent on an independent parliamentarian's support) at the 2014 election, Snelling was appointed as the Minister for Health, Minister for Mental Health and Substance Abuse, Minister for the Arts and Minister for Health Industries in the Weatherill Labor cabinet. He resigned from Cabinet on 17 September 2017, and announced that he would not be contesting the 2018 election, for which he had been preselected to the seat of Florey. He also served as Leader of Government Business in the House of Assembly until 2017.

=== Outside parliament ===
On 28 July 2021, alongside former minister Tom Kenyon, Snelling founded the Family First Party, saying that "we are very concerned about religious freedom and attempts to restrict that freedom".

== Personal life ==
Jack Snelling is married to Lucia, and has six children. He met his wife through the Young Labor movement in South Australia.

Political offices
Preceded by Kevin Foley	Treasurer of South Australia; 2011–2013	Succeeded by Jay Weatherill
Preceded by John Hill	Minister for Health and Ageing; 2013–2014	Succeeded by Zoe Bettison as Minister for Ageing
Preceded by John Hill	Minister for Health and Ageing; 2013–2014	Continues as Minister for Health
Previously as Minister for Health and Ageing	Minister for Health; 2014–2017	Succeeded by Peter Malinauskas
New title	Minister for Health Industries; 2014–2017	Succeeded by Martin Hamilton-Smith
Preceded by Jay Weatherill	Minister for the Arts; 2014–2017	Succeeded by Jay Weatherill
Parliament of South Australia
Preceded by John Quirke	Member for Playford; 1997–2018	Succeeded by Michael Brown
Preceded by Bob Such	Speaker of the South Australian House of Assembly; 2006–2010	Succeeded by Lyn Breuer
