= PIRSA =

PIRSA may refer to:

- Perimeter Institute Recorded Seminar Archive (PIRSA)
- Primary Industries and Regions SA, a South Australian government agency
