= Leader of the House =

Leader of the House or Leader of Government Business may refer to:

== Asia ==
- In Bangladesh
  - Leader of the House in Jatiya Sangsad
  - Leader of the House in the Senate of Bangladesh
- In India
  - Leader of the House in Lok Sabha
  - Leader of the House in Rajya Sabha
  - Leader of the House in the Maharashtra Legislative Assembly
  - Leader of the House in the Maharashtra Legislative Council
  - Leader of the House in the Tamil Nadu Legislative Assembly
- in Pakistan
  - Leader of the House in the National Assembly
  - Leader of the House in the Senate of Pakistan
- Leader of the House (Sri Lanka)

== Australasia/Oceania ==
- In Australia
  - Leader of the House (Australia)
  - Manager of Government Business in the Senate, the upper house equivalent in the federal parliament
  - Leader of the House (Queensland), Australia
  - Leader of Government Business in the House of Assembly (South Australia)
  - Leader of the Government in the Legislative Council (South Australia)
  - Leader of the House (New South Wales)
  - Leader of the House in the Victorian Legislative Assembly
  - Leader of the Government in the Victorian Legislative Council
- Leader of the House in the New Zealand Parliament

== Europe ==
- Leader of the Seanad, Ireland
- In the United Kingdom
  - Leader of the House of Commons
  - Leader of the House of Lords
  - Minister and Leader of the House of Commons, Northern Ireland
  - Leader of the Senate of Northern Ireland
  - Trefnydd of the Senedd
  - Minister for Parliamentary Business

== North America ==
- House leader, in Canada
  - Leader of the Government in the House of Commons of Canada
  - Representative of the Government in the Senate, formerly known as the Leader of the Government in the Senate
  - Government House Leader in the Legislative Assembly of British Columbia
  - Government House Leader in the Legislative Assembly of Ontario
  - Government House Leader in the Newfoundland and Labrador House of Assembly
  - Government House Leader in the National Assembly of Quebec
- Leader of Government Business of the Cayman Islands, now known as Premier of the Cayman Islands

== Africa ==
- Leader of Government Business in the National Assembly of South Africa

== See also ==
- Parliamentary leader, the person leading a parliamentary group or caucus
- Category:Legislative leaders
