= Katrine Hildyard =

Australian politician

The Honourable Katrine Hildyard MP
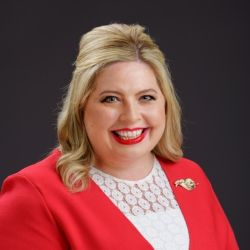
- Hildyard in 2022

Minister for Human Services
- Incumbent
- Assumed office 25 March 2026
- Premier: Peter Malinauskas
- Preceded by: Nat Cook

Minister for Seniors and Ageing Well
- Incumbent
- Assumed office 25 March 2026
- Premier: Peter Malinauskas
- Preceded by: Nat Cook

Minister for Women
- Incumbent
- Assumed office 24 March 2022
- Premier: Peter Malinauskas
- Preceded by: Zoe Bettison (as Minister for the Status of Women)

Minister for Domestic, Family and Sexual Violence
- In office 24 March 2022 – 25 March 2026
- Premier: Peter Malinauskas
- Preceded by: Carolyn Power (as Assistant Minister for Domestic and Family Violence Prevention)
- Succeeded by: Alice Rolls

Minister for Child Protection
- In office 24 March 2022 – 25 March 2026
- Premier: Peter Malinauskas
- Preceded by: Rachel Sanderson
- Succeeded by: Alice Rolls

Minister for Recreation, Sport and Racing
- In office 24 March 2022 – 29 January 2025
- Premier: Peter Malinauskas
- Preceded by: Corey Wingard
- Succeeded by: Emily Bourke

Member of the South Australian House of Assembly for Reynell
- Incumbent
- Assumed office 15 March 2014
- Preceded by: Gay Thompson

Personal details
- Born: Katrine Anne Hildyard
- Party: Labor
- Spouse: Charles Wright
- Education: Flinders University
- Profession: Trade union leader, company director, clerical worker, cleaner

Katrine Anne Hildyard is an Australian politician] representing the electoral district of Reynell in the Parliament of South Australia as a member of the South Australian Labor Party since the 2014 state election. As of November 2026 she is the Minister for Human Services, Minister for Seniors and Ageing Well, and Minister for Women in the second Malinauskas ministry.

Hildyard was previously appointed to the Weatherill ministry in September 2017 as Minister for Disabilities and served in this role until the 2018 state election, when Labor lost government. After the 2022 South Australian state election, she has served in a number of ministerial roles under Peter Malinauskas.

== Early life and education ==
Katrine Anne Hildyard was born in Adelaide and grew up in Netley with her brother and two sisters. During Hildyard's childhood her mother, Jeanette Walsh, was the victim of domestic violence from her estranged alcoholic father, which shaped her passion on the issue in later life. She was also inspired by her mother's resilience in adversity; she returned to complete her schooling and achieved a teaching degree. Her mother taught the children to value their family strongly, as well ad to be active in the community and to help others less fortunate.

Hildyard attended Plympton High School and later studied a Bachelor of Arts at Flinders University as a mature age student. She worked as a cleaner, shop assistant, lecturer, and clerical worker. She later graduated from the Australian Institute of Company Directors and was a Fellow of the Governor's Leadership Foundation.

== Career ==
Hildyard joined the Labor Party in the 1990s and became a member of the Labor Left. She worked for ALP Senator Nick Bolkus between 1994 and 1996.

In 1996 Hildyard began working for the South Australian branch of the Australian Services Union (ASU), where she was elected Assistant Secretary in 2006 and later Secretary in 2009. As Secretary the ASU campaigned for overwhelmingly female community sector workers to have their wages increased to match their mainly-male private sector counterparts. An equal pay case before Fair Work Australia was successful in 2012, and the State Government committed to increasing wages between 19 and 41 per cent. The ASU also committed to supporting same-sex marriage and lobbying the Labor Party to change its policy, which at the time was opposed to any change.

In 2008 Hildyard participated in the social inclusion stream of the Australia 2020 Summit. She was appointed to the Premier's Council for Women in 2011.

=== In office ===
At the 2014 state election Hildyard was elected as the Labor member for Reynell, replacing retiring member Gay Thompson. In her maiden speech, Hildyard said her priorities included reducing domestic violence, supporting equal pay for women, maintaining high quality mental health services, and recognising Indigenous Australians in the constitution.

Hildyard lobbied Attorney-General John Rau to include paid domestic violence leave as an industrial right for 120,000 public sector employees.

In February 2015 Hildyard was promoted to the position of Parliamentary Secretary to the Premier. She also led a taskforce on Women in Sport, composed of athletes, administrators and event managers, to help close the pay gap for women athletes and encourage investment in women's sport. She joined fellow MPs Nat Cook and Chris Picton, located in Adelaide's southern suburbs, to oppose the government's proposed changes to emergency department services at the Noarlunga Hospital. Hildyard pledged to update the Equal Opportunity Act to prevent discrimination against victims of domestic violence, and to provide paid annual leave to victims so they can attend medical and police appointments, and move house if necessary. She also launched a parliamentary anti-domestic violence group with Liberal MP Dan Van Holst Pellekaan.

Hildyard was elected the president of the South Australian Labor Party in October 2015. Hildyard also co-sponsored a bill to remove discrimination against same-sex parents being listed on the birth certificate of a child. Hildyard was appointed to cabinet in September 2017 as Minister for Disabilities; and served in this role until Labor lost the 2018 state election.

She was re-elected in the 2022 South Australian state election on an increased majority. Labor also won government in the election. She was appointed as Minister for Child Protection, Minister for Women and the Prevention of Domestic and Family Violence and Minister for Recreation, Sport and Racing in the first Malinauskas ministry. Hildyard's office is in Christies Beach.

== Other roles ==
Hildyard was inaugural CEO of Together SA.

== Recognition and honours ==
Hildyard was honoured in the 2011 South Australian Women's Honour Roll for her work in fighting for pay equity for women.

In 2012, Hildyard received an Women Hold Up Half the Sky Award, part of the Australia Day awards and honours. The award was established by the SA Government in 2011 to recognise contributions made by women to the community, and renamed in 2019 as the South Australian Women's Award.

== Personal life ==
Hildyard married Charles and has two sons. As of November 2026 she lives in the southern suburbs of Adelaide. She is a practising Catholic.

She is a long-time supporter of the Southern Football League, and provides live commentary of games from that competition in a weekly radio broadcast during the football season.

South Australian House of Assembly
Preceded by Gay Thompson	Member for Reynell; 2014–present	Incumbent
Political offices
Preceded by Leesa Vlahos	Minister for Disabilities; 2017–2018	Succeeded by Michelle Lensink as Minister for Human Services
Preceded by Corey Wingard	Minister for Recreation, Sport and Racing; 2022–2025	Succeeded by Emily Bourke
Preceded by Rachel Sanderson	Minister for Child Protection; 2022–2026	Succeeded by Alice Rolls
Preceded by Zoe Bettison as Minister for the Status of Women	Minister for Women and the Prevention of Domestic and Family Violence; 2022–2024	Succeeded by Herself as Minister for Women and the Prevention of Domestic, Family and Sexual Violence
Preceded by Carolyn Power as Assistant Minister for Domestic and Family Violence Prevention	Minister for Women and the Prevention of Domestic and Family Violence; 2022–2024	Succeeded by Herself as Minister for Women and the Prevention of Domestic, Family and Sexual Violence
Preceded by Herself as Minister for Women and the Prevention of Domestic and Family Violence	Minister for Women and the Prevention of Domestic, Family and Sexual Violence; 2024–2025	Succeeded by Herself as Minister for Domestic, Family and Sexual Violence
Preceded by Herself as Minister for Women and the Prevention of Domestic and Family Violence	Minister for Women and the Prevention of Domestic, Family and Sexual Violence; 2024–2025	Succeeded by Herself as Minister for Women
Preceded by Herself as Minister for Women and the Prevention of Domestic, Family and Sexual Violence	Minister for Domestic, Family and Sexual Violence; 2025–2026	Succeeded by Alice Rolls
Preceded by Herself as Minister for Women and the Prevention of Domestic, Family and Sexual Violence	Minister for Women; 2025–present	Incumbent
Preceded by Nat Cook	Minister for Human Services; 2026–present	Incumbent
Preceded by Nat Cook	Minister for Seniors and Ageing Well; 2026–present	Incumbent
