= Primary Industries and Regions SA =

Department of Primary Industries and Regions (PIRSA)
Department overview
- Jurisdiction: South Australia
- Headquarters: 11 Waymouth Street, Adelaide
- Employees: 830
- Annual budget: $250.1 million
- Minister responsible: Clare Scriven, Minister for Primary Industries and Regional Development, Minister for Forest Industries
- Department executive: Prof. Mehdi Doroudi, Chief Executive
- Website: Department of Primary Industries and Regions

Primary Industries and Regions SA (PIRSA), also known as Primary Industries and Regions South Australia, and the Department of Primary Industries and Regions SA, is an agency of the South Australian Government whose focus is the economic development of the state of South Australia. Its key areas of work include primary sector industries (in South Australia, mainly farming), and biosecurity.

== Description ==
The purpose of the agency is to "grow primary industries and drive regional development". Its key areas of work include primary sector industries (in SA, mainly agriculture, viticulture and farming of livestock), marine aquaculture, and biosecurity. Agribusiness, covering "food and beverage, field crops, meat and livestock, wine, seafood, horticulture and forestry sectors" are seen as mainstays and growth areas of the South Australian economy.

Along with the South Australian Research and Development Institute (SARDI), PIRSA has been located at the Waite Research Precinct, alongside the University of Adelaide's Waite campus since about 1994.

The Fisheries and Aquaculture division manages the state's fish stocks, along with industry and the community, by developing and implementing policy and regulations to ensure sustainable development of the aquaculture industry. It employs fisheries officers to monitor compliance with fishing regulations.

PIRSA runs a grants program for farm industry business owners and operators.

SARDI is the state government's principal research institute, and forms part of PIRSA.

== Organisational history ==
In 1992, the South Australian Department of Agriculture, the Department of Fisheries, and the Department of Woods and Forests merged to form Primary Industries South Australia (PISA). In 1996–1997, the name of Mines and Energy South Australia was changed to Mines and Energy Resources South Australia (MERSA).

In 1997, PISA and MERSA merged to form Primary Industries and Resources SA, formally the Department of Primary Industries and Resources SA (PIRSA). In 2011–12 the name was changed to Primary Industries and Regions SA.

In 2019, the Pastoral Board of South Australia, which governs pastoral leases in South Australia, moved to PIRSA from the Department for Environment and Water.

In 2019, PIRSA and SARDI also entered a partnership with the University of Adelaide in which scientists in diverse disciplines were to be able to access PIRSA's research farms and share their academic knowledge to the agricultural sector. The collaboration was anticipated to help develop SA's expertise in dryland agriculture by encouraging multi-disciplinary research and helping to bring about new export opportunities.

== Biosecurity Act upgrade ==
In 2020, PIRSA started a review of biosecurity legislation in South Australia, which had been covered by several pieces of legislation; the aim was to achieve a single Act for the state that would ensure South Australia's biosecurity systems remain effective. As of March 2024, the Bill was expected to progress through the parliamentary process by the end of the year.

== Examples of PIRSA's work ==
In 2007, as part of its community program, PIRSA administered a travel survey in Adelaide that identified the need for secure parking for bicycles in the city. A parking station for 21 bikes was built in a basement at the Grenfell Centre, which proved very popular. It also established a bicycle user group.

PIRSA fisheries officers police fishers' compliance with fisheries regulations to ensure fish stocks are safeguarded for future generations. An example in December 2014 was when fisheries officers caught two men fishing at Wallaroo for snapper during the annual closure period. The men fled and were detained 20 kilometres (12 miles) away. The fishers were fined and ordered to pay costs totalling A$2,184.

To help with landholders' recovery from the December 2019 bushfires, PIRSA prepared, with other agencies, an impact assessment of the damage done to many types of agricultural enterprises. Advice on caring for stock, coordination of various types of assistance, and technical support were given to people who had suffered losses from the fires, many of whom were located around Cudlee Creek and on Kangaroo Island.
