= Leader of Government Business in the South Australian House of Assembly =

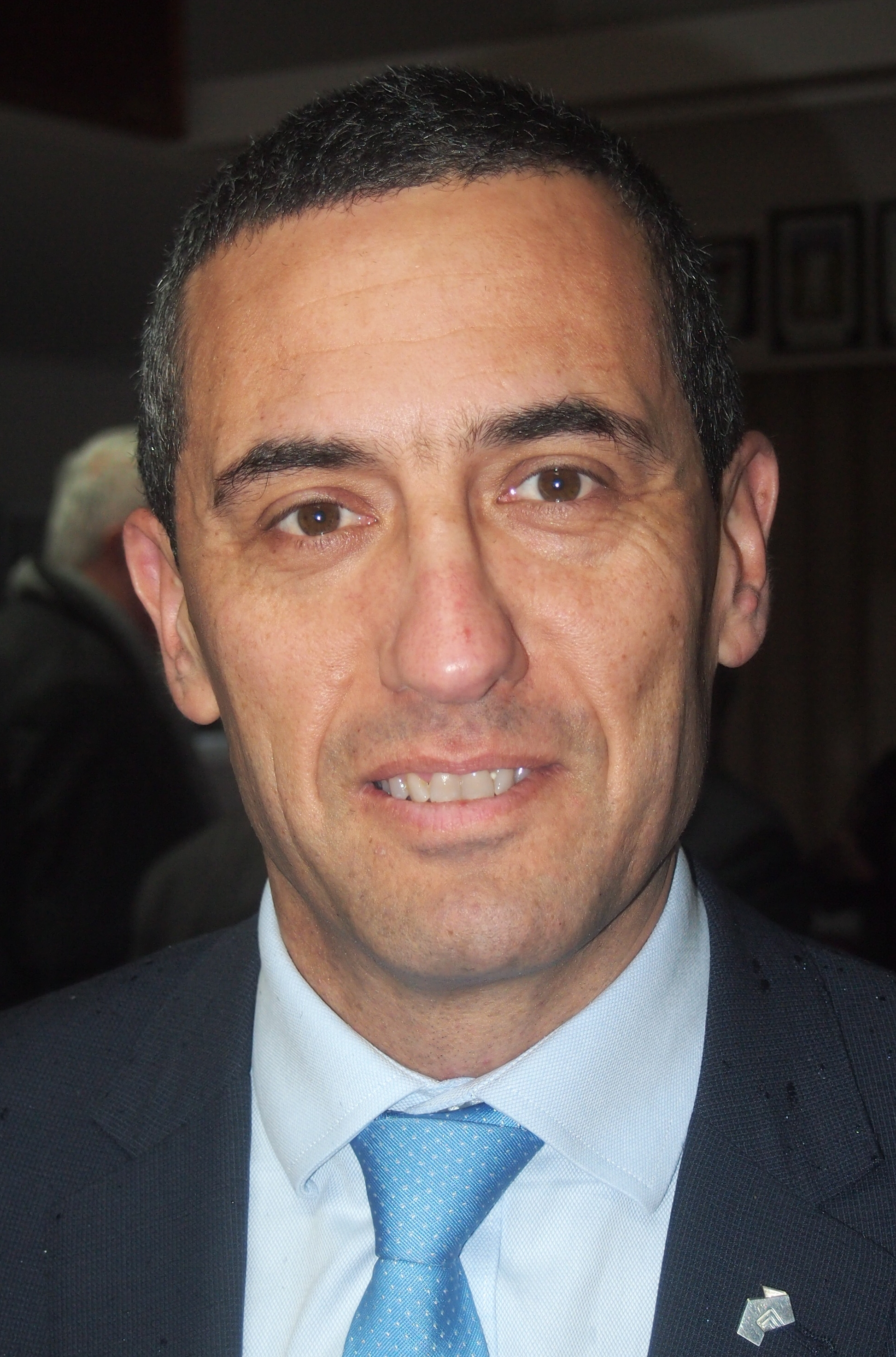
- Incumbent; Tom Koutsantonis since 24 March 2022

The Leader of Government Business in the South Australian House of Assembly, commonly known as Leader of the House, is responsible for the management of government business in the lower house of the Parliament of South Australia. The office is held by a member of the Cabinet of South Australia.

The Leader of Government Business, also known as Manager of Government Business, is responsible for managing and scheduling government business including:

- the order in which government issues are to be dealt with
- tactical matters in reaction to impediments to such management
- negotiation with their opposition counterpart (the Manager of Opposition Business) about the order in which bills are to be debated, and
- time allotted for debate.

== List of government business leaders ==
Leader	Term began	Term ended	Time in office
Jack Snelling		2017	
Tom Koutsantonis	2017	18 March 2018	
John Gardner	22 March 2018	5 February 2020	1 year, 320 days
Stephan Knoll	5 February 2020	26 July 2020	172 days
Dan van Holst Pellekaan	29 July 2020	21 March 2022	1 year, 235 days
Tom Koutsantonis	24 March 2022	incumbent	4 years, 167 days

== See also ==
- Leader of Government Business in the Legislative Council (South Australia)
- Leader of Government Business (disambiguation)
- Cabinet of South Australia
- Government of South Australia
