= Kyam Maher =

Australian politician

The Honourable Kyam Maher MLC
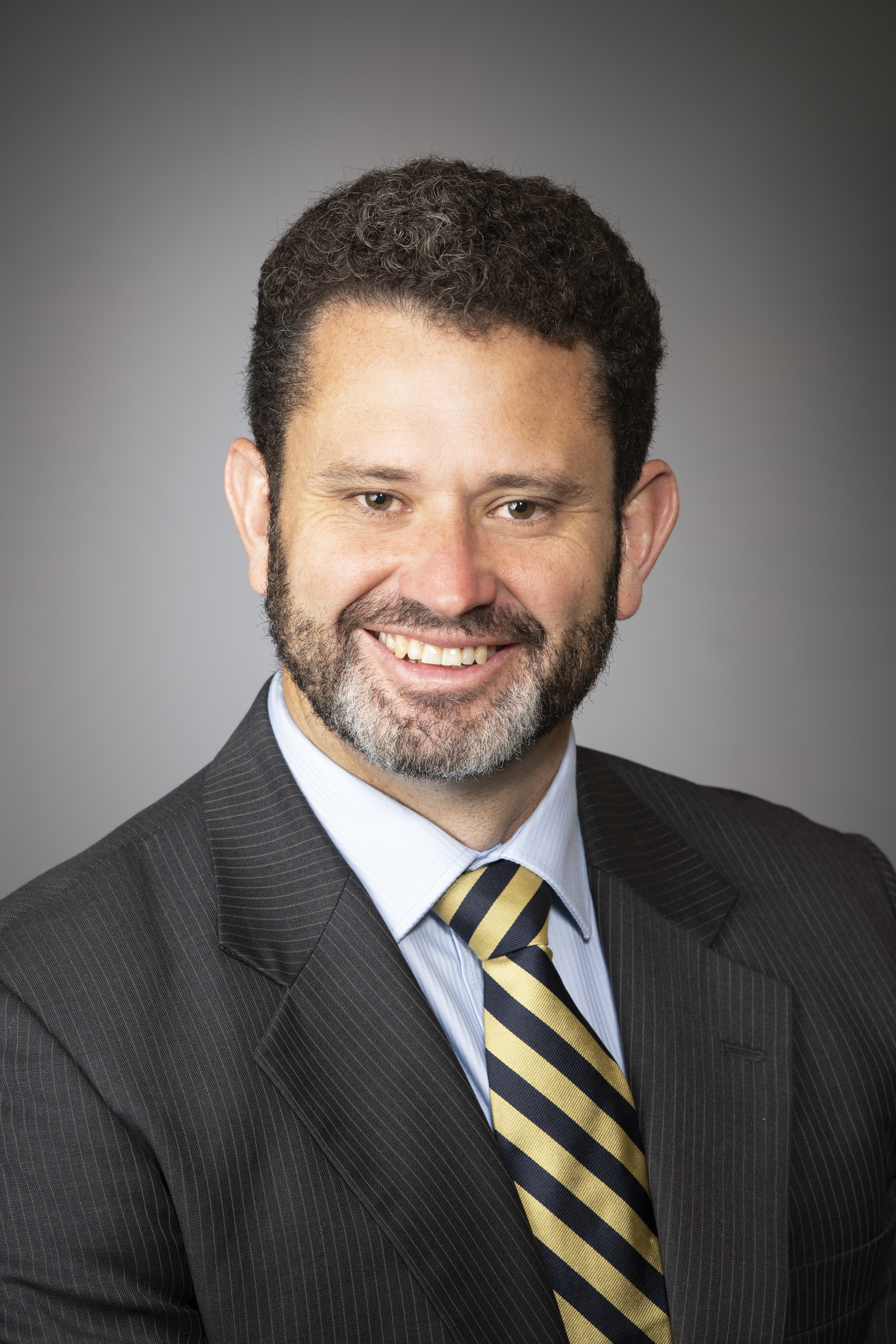
- Official portrait, 2018

Deputy Premier of South Australia
- Incumbent
- Assumed office 19 September 2025
- Premier: Peter Malinauskas
- Preceded by: Susan Close

51st Attorney-General of South Australia
- Incumbent
- Assumed office 24 March 2022
- Premier: Peter Malinauskas
- Preceded by: Vickie Chapman

Minister for the Arts
- Incumbent
- Assumed office 26 March 2026
- Premier: Peter Malinauskas
- Preceded by: Andrea Michaels

Minister for Industrial Relations
- Incumbent
- Assumed office 26 March 2026
- Premier: Peter Malinauskas
- Preceded by: Himself (as Minister for Industrial Relations and Public Sector)

Special Minister of State
- Incumbent
- Assumed office 29 January 2025
- Premier: Peter Malinauskas
- Preceded by: Dan Cregan

Minister for Industrial Relations and Public Sector
- In office 24 March 2022 – 26 March 2025
- Premier: Peter Malinauskas
- Preceded by: John Rau (2018)
- Succeeded by: Himself (as Minister for Industrial Relations); Tom Koutsantonis (as Minister for Public Sector

Minister for Aboriginal Affairs
- Incumbent
- Assumed office 24 March 2022
- Premier: Peter Malinauskas
- Preceded by: Steven Marshall
- In office 3 February 2015 – 18 March 2018
- Premier: Jay Weatherill
- Preceded by: Ian Hunter
- Succeeded by: Steven Marshall (as Premier)

Leader of the Government in the Legislative Council
- Incumbent
- Assumed office 24 March 2022
- Premier: Peter Malinauskas
- Preceded by: Rob Lucas
- In office 18 January 2016 – 18 March 2018
- Premier: Jay Weatherill
- Preceded by: Gail Gago
- Succeeded by: Rob Lucas

Minister for Manufacturing and Innovation Minister for Automotive Transformation
- In office 3 February 2015 – 18 March 2018
- Premier: Jay Weatherill
- Preceded by: Susan Close
- Succeeded by: David Pisoni (as Minister for Industry and Skills)

Member of the South Australian Legislative Council
- Incumbent
- Assumed office 17 October 2012
- Preceded by: Bob Sneath

Personal details
- Born: Kyam Joseph Maher Littlehampton, South Australia
- Party: Australian Labor Party (SA)
- Spouse: Carmel Maher
- Education: University of Adelaide
- Occupation: Lawyer

Kyam Joseph Maher is an Australian politician and lawyer who has been Deputy Premier of South Australia since 19 September 2025. He has also been Attorney-General of South Australia, Minister for Aboriginal Affairs, Minister for Industrial Relations and Public Sector, and the Leader of the Government in the Legislative Council since March 2022, and continues to hold these roles after promotion to deputy premier in the September 2025 Cabinet reshuffle. He is also Special Minister of State (holding responsibility for electoral services) since January 2025. Maher is the first ever Indigenous Australian person to serve as Attorney-General, and also the first as Deputy Premier in South Australia.

He was appointed to a casual vacancy in the South Australian Legislative Council for the South Australian Branch of the Australian Labor Party on 17 October 2012. He previously served in the Cabinet of South Australia between 2015 and 2018 and was the Leader of the Government in the Legislative Council between 2016 and 2018.

== Early life and education ==
Kyam Joseph Maher is of Aboriginal Tasmanian descent.

He spent his early years in Littlehampton, a small country town in the Adelaide Hills, before moving to Mount Gambier, where he attended Grant High School. He left Mount Gambier to study law and economics at the University of Adelaide, where he earned degrees in both subjects.

Maher does not consider that he experienced the disadvantage and racism that is common for many Aboriginal people in Australia.

== Career ==
Maher practised as a lawyer in the Crown Solicitor's Office in South Australia. When Labor won the 2002 state election, Maher was appointed Chief of Staff to Terry Roberts, Minister for three portfolios: Regional Affairs, Aboriginal Affairs and Correctional Services.

He later became South Australian state secretary of the Australian Labor Party.

In 2006, he was an inaugural committee member of the Progressive Labour Education Association Inc (PLEA), a joint-venture training organisation operated by the ALP Socialist Left faction and aligned unions United Voice (then the Liquor Hospitality and Miscellaneous Union) and the Australian Services Union.

Maher was appointed to the South Australian Legislative Council in 2012 to replace outgoing MLC Bob Sneath. Maher was re-elected from fourth position on the Labor ticket at the 2014 election, and was appointed parliamentary secretary to the Minister for Agriculture, Food and Fisheries.

In February 2015 he was appointed to cabinet and, between 2015 and the 2018 state election, Maher served as minister in the Labor Weatherill Ministry in a range of portfolios including manufacturing and innovation, automotive transformation, Aboriginal affairs and reconciliation; and employment and science and information economy. Maher was the first Aboriginal South Australian Minister for Aboriginal Affairs.

On 18 January 2016 Maher was appointed as the Leader of the Government in the Legislative Council in the Weatherill government.

After Labor won government at the 2022 state election, Maher was appointed Attorney-General in the Malinauskas ministry on 24 March, as well as Minister for Aboriginal Affairs and Minister for Industrial Relations and Public Sector. He also became Leader of the Government in the Legislative Council for the second time. Maher was the first Aboriginal man in the nation's history to be appointed Attorney-General.

In his role as Minister for Aboriginal Affairs, he presided over reforms which saw South Australia become the first state in Australia to commence Treaty negotiations with Aboriginal nations and implementing a Stolen Generations reparations scheme.

In a Cabinet reshuffle on 29 January 2025, Maher was appointed Special Minister of State, making him also responsible for Parliamentary resources, including Electorate Services.

Following Deputy Premier Susan Close's decision to step down from politics, on 19 September 2025, Maher was elected by the party to be its deputy leader and he became the state's Deputy Premier, in addition to his existing ministerial roles as Attorney-General and Minister for Aboriginal Affairs. He is the first Indigenous Australian person to serve as Deputy Premier in the history of South Australia. As of September 2025 he is also Leader of the Government in the Legislative Council, Minister for Industrial Relations and Public Sector, and Special Minister of State.

== Personal life ==
Maher married Carmel, and they have three boys. Maher also has a fondness for sausage rolls.

Parliament of South Australia
Preceded by Bob Sneath	Member of the South Australian Legislative Council; 2012–present Served alongside: Multiple Members	Incumbent
Political offices
Preceded by Susan Close	Minister for Manufacturing and Innovation; 2015–2018	Succeeded by David Pisoni as Minister for Industry and Skills
Preceded by Susan Close	Minister for Automotive Transformation; 2015–2018	Succeeded by David Pisoni as Minister for Industry and Skills
Preceded by Ian Hunter	Minister for Aboriginal Affairs and Reconciliation; 2015–2018	Succeeded by Steven Marshall as Premier of South Australia
Preceded by Gail Gago	Leader of the Government in the South Australian Legislative Council; 2016–2018	Succeeded by Rob Lucas
Preceded by Gail Gago	Minister for Science and Information Economy; 2016–2018	Succeeded by David Ridgway as Minister for Trade, Tourism and Investment
Preceded by Gail Gago as Minister for Employment, Higher Education and Skills	Minister for Employment; 2016–2018	Succeeded by David Ridgway as Minister for Trade, Tourism and Investment
Preceded by Vickie Chapman	Attorney-General of South Australia; 2022–present	Incumbent
Preceded by Rob Lucas	Leader of the Government in the South Australian Legislative Council; 2022–present	Incumbent
