= Leader of the Government in the South Australian Legislative Council =

- Incumbent; Kyam Maher since 24 March 2022

The Leader of the Government in the South Australian Legislative Council, commonly known as Leader of the Council and also called Leader of Government Business or Manager of Government Business, is the chief representative of the government in the upper house of the Parliament of South Australia. The leader is also responsible for the management of government business in the chamber. The office is held by a member of the Cabinet of South Australia.

Being the representative of the government in the upper house, the Leader of the Government takes a major part in debates in parliament. In terms of managing and scheduling government business, the Leader of the Government is responsible including:

- the order in which government issues are to be dealt with
- tactical matters in reaction to impediments to such management
- negotiation with their opposition counterpart (the Manager of Opposition Business) about the order in which bills are to be debated, and
- time allotted for debate.

== List of leaders of the government ==
Govt leader	Term began	Term ended	Time in office
Rob Lucas	14 February 1993	5 March 2002	9 years, 19 days
Paul Holloway	2002	2011	
Bernard Finnigan	February 2011	21 April 2011	
Gail Gago	2011	2016	
Kyam Maher	18 January 2016	18 March 2018	2 years, 59 days
Rob Lucas	22 March 2018	21 March 2022	3 years, 364 days
Kyam Maher	24 March 2022	incumbent	4 years, 167 days

== See also ==
- Leader of Government Business in the House of Assembly (South Australia)
- Leader of Government Business (disambiguation)
- Cabinet of South Australia
- Government of South Australia
