= Joe Szakacs =

Australian politician and trade unionist

The Honourable Joe Szakacs MP
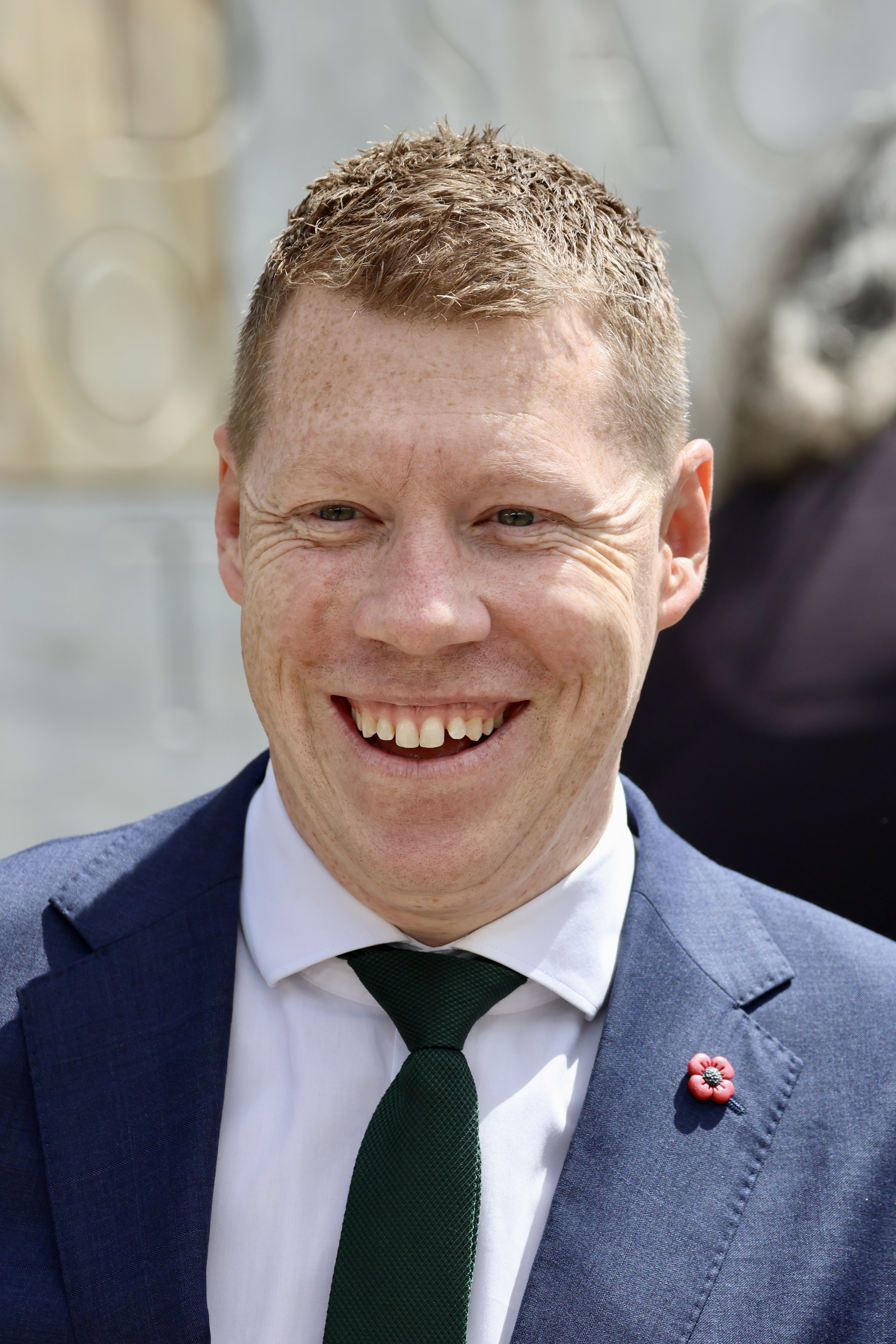
- Szakacs in 2025

Minister for Infrastructure and Transport
- Incumbent
- Assumed office 25 March 2026
- Premier: Peter Malinauskas
- Preceded by: Emily Bourke

Minister for Industry, Innovation and Science
- In office 19 September 2025 – 25 March 2026
- Premier: Peter Malinauskas
- Preceded by: Susan Close
- Succeeded by: Position abolished

Minister for Local Government Minister for Veterans Affairs
- In office 15 April 2024 – 25 March 2026
- Premier: Peter Malinauskas
- Preceded by: Geoff Brock
- Succeeded by: Chris Picton (as Minister for Veterans' Affairs); Rhiannon Pearce (as Minister for Local Government)

Minister for Trade and Investment
- In office 15 April 2024 – 25 March 2026
- Premier: Peter Malinauskas
- Preceded by: Nick Champion
- Succeeded by: Position abolished

Minister for Police, Emergency Services and Correctional Services
- In office 24 March 2022 – 15 April 2024
- Premier: Peter Malinauskas
- Preceded by: Vincent Tarzia
- Succeeded by: Dan Cregan

Member of the South Australian House of Assembly for Cheltenham
- Incumbent
- Assumed office 9 February 2019
- Preceded by: Jay Weatherill

Personal details
- Born: Joseph Karl Szakacs Woodville South, South Australia
- Party: Labor
- Education: St Michael's College
- Alma mater: Flinders University
- Occupation: Trade union secretary
- Profession: Lawyer

Joseph Karl Szakacs (/ˈsɒkɑːtʃ/ "SOCK-arch") is an Australian politician and trade unionist. He is a Labor Party member of the South Australian House of Assembly, representing the electoral district of Cheltenham since the 2019 by-election.

Szakacs has served as the Minister for Infrastructure and Transport in the second Malinauskas ministry since March 2026.

== Early life and education ==
Joseph Karl Szakacs was born in Adelaide to a Hungarian father and Australian mother. He attended St Michael's College, Adelaide. In his teens, Szakacs was a competitive swimmer, holding the state 50m freestyle title and representing Australia at the 2002–03 FINA Swimming World Cup. He won swimming scholarships to the South Australian Institute of Sport and the University of Missouri, then returned to Australia to study law at Flinders University.

== Career ==
=== Early career ===
Introduced to the trade union movement by his father, a waterside worker in Port Adelaide, Szakacs worked as a volunteer lawyer at the Young Workers Legal Service, then as an industrial officer with the Australian Manufacturing Workers Union and later the United Firefighters Union South Australia. In October 2013, he was elected as state secretary of SA Unions.

=== Political career ===
Szakacs was elected to the South Australian House of Assembly in the by-election for the seat of Cheltenham on 9 February 2019, replacing former premier Jay Weatherill.

After Labor won the 2022 state election, Szakacs was appointed as the Minister for Police, Emergency Services and Correctional Services in the first Malinauskas ministry.

In a Cabinet reshuffle on 19 September 2025, Szakacs retained his roles as Minister for Trade and Investment; Minister for Industry, Innovation and Science; Minister for Local Government; and Minister for Veterans Affairs.

Following the Labor landslide victory at the 2026 election, Szakacs was appointed Minister for Infrastructure and Transport in the second Malinauskas ministry.

Parliament of South Australia
Preceded by Jay Weatherill	Member for Cheltenham; 2019–present	Incumbent
Political offices
Preceded by Vincent Tarzia	Minister for Police, Emergency Services and Correctional Services; 2022–2024	Succeeded by Dan Cregan
Preceded by Geoff Brock	Minister for Veterans' Affairs; 2024–2026	Succeeded by Chris Picton
Preceded by Geoff Brock	Minister for Local Government; 2024–2026	Succeeded by Rhiannon Pearce
Preceded by Nick Champion	Minister for Trade and Investment; 2024–2026	Office abolished
Preceded by Susan Close	Minister for Industry, Innovation and Science; 2025–2026	Office abolished
Preceded by Emily Bourke	Minister for Minister for Infrastructure and Transport; 2026–present	Incumbent
