= Blair Boyer =

Australian politician (born 1981)

The Honourable Blair Boyer MP
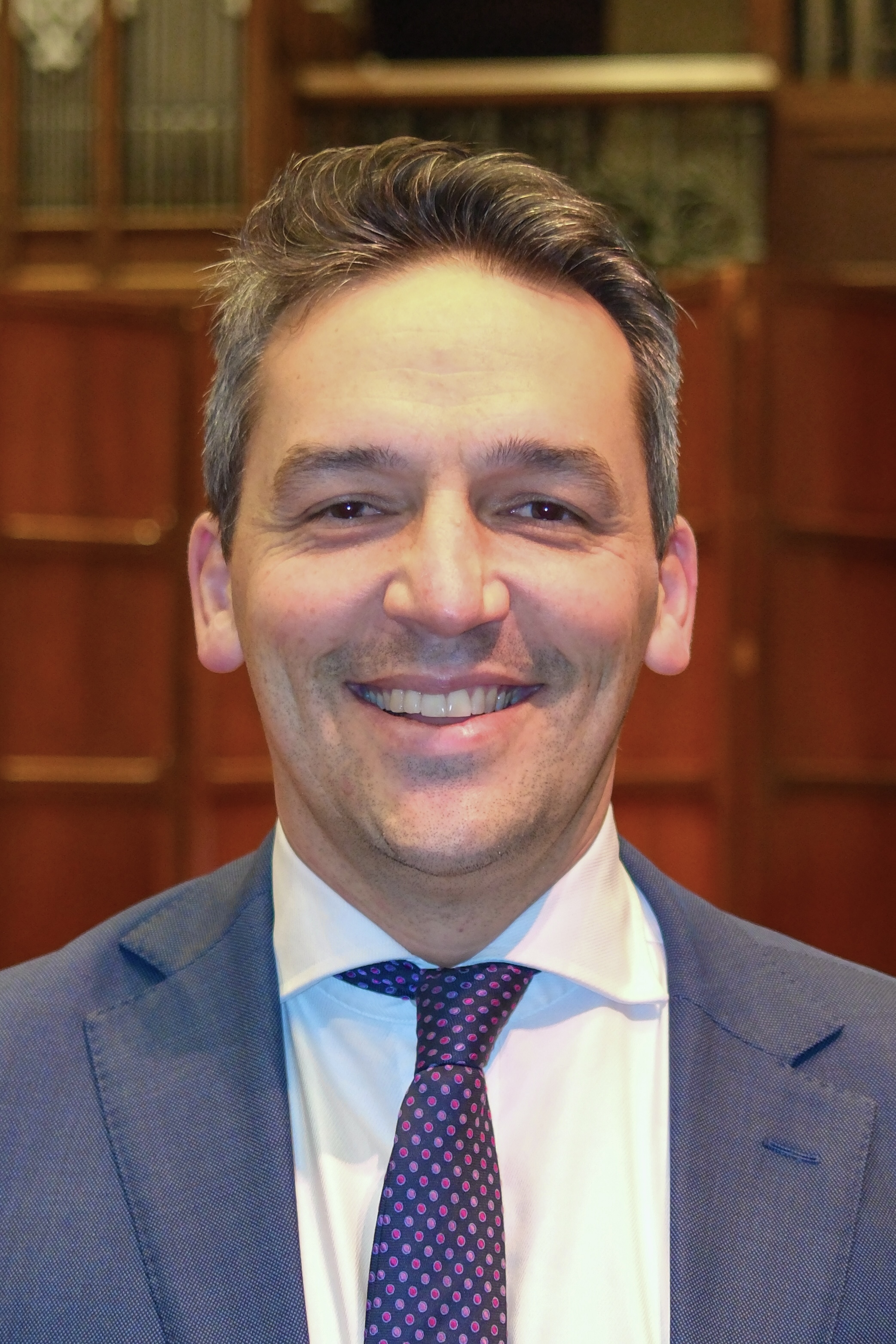
- Boyer at the Elder Conservatorium of Music on 2 June 2026

Minister for Health and Wellbeing
- Incumbent
- Assumed office 25 March 2026
- Premier: Peter Malinauskas
- Preceded by: Chris Picton

Minister for Police
- In office 19 September 2025 – 25 March 2026
- Premier: Peter Malinauskas
- Preceded by: Stephen Mullighan
- Succeeded by: Michael Brown

Minister for Education, Training and Skills
- In office 24 March 2022 – 25 March 2026
- Premier: Peter Malinauskas
- Preceded by: John Gardner (as Minister for Education); David Pisoni (as Minister for Innovation and Skills)
- Succeeded by: Lucy Hood

Member of the South Australian House of Assembly for Wright
- Incumbent
- Assumed office 17 March 2018
- Preceded by: Jennifer Rankine

Personal details
- Born: Blair Ingram Boyer; 30 March 1981 (age 45) Portland, Victoria
- Party: Labor
- Education: Monash University
- Profession: Lawyer
- Website: www.blairboyermp.com

Blair Ingram Boyer (born 30 March 1981) is an Australian politician. He has been a Labor member of the South Australian House of Assembly since the 2018 state election, representing Wright.

A solicitor by training, Boyer worked as chief of staff for his predecessor Jennifer Rankine, and was also deputy chief of staff to Premier Jay Weatherill.

In May 2018, Boyer was appointed the Shadow Minister for Education, Training and Skills in the Malinauskas shadow ministry. After his party won government in the 2022 election, he was appointed as Minister for Education, Training and Skills and Minister for Police in the first Malinauskas ministry. Following the 2026 election, he was appointed Minister for Health and Wellbeing in the second Malinauskas ministry.

== Popular Culture ==
Boyer went viral in 2023 for hitting a "no look over the back basketball shot" from the halfway line.

South Australian House of Assembly
| Preceded by Jennifer Rankine | Member for Wright; 2018–present | Incumbent |
Political offices
| Preceded by John Gardner as Minister for Education | Minister for Education, Training and Skills; 2022–2026 | Succeeded by Lucy Hood |
| Preceded by David Pisoni as Minister for Innovation and Skills | Minister for Education, Training and Skills; 2022–2026 | Succeeded by Lucy Hood |
| Preceded by Stephen Mullighan | Minister for Police; 2025–2026 | Succeeded by Michael Brown |
| Preceded by Chris Picton | Minister for Health and Wellbeing; 2026–present | Incumbent |
