= Lucy Hood (politician) =

Australian politician

Lucy Hood MP
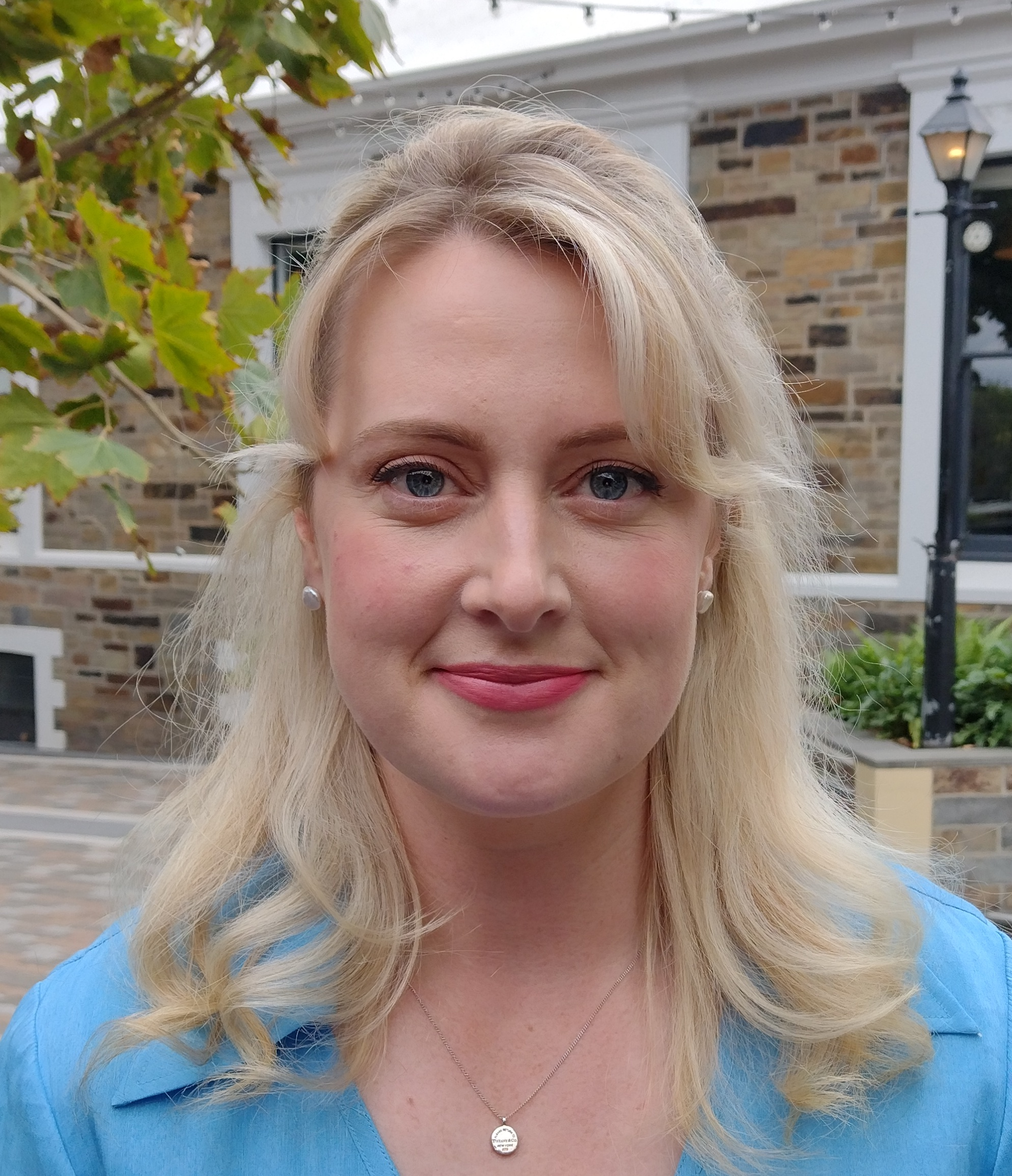
- Hood in 2022

Minister for Education, Training and Skills
- Incumbent
- Assumed office 25 March 2026
- Premier: Peter Malinauskas
- Preceded by: Blair Boyer

Minister for Autism
- Incumbent
- Assumed office 25 March 2026
- Premier: Peter Malinauskas
- Preceded by: Emily Bourke

Minister for the City of Adelaide
- Incumbent
- Assumed office 25 March 2026
- Premier: Peter Malinauskas
- Preceded by: Position established

Minister for Climate, Environment and Water
- In office 19 September 2025 – 26 March 2026
- Premier: Peter Malinauskas
- Preceded by: Susan Close

Member of the South Australian House of Assembly for Adelaide
- Incumbent
- Assumed office 19 March 2022
- Preceded by: Rachel Sanderson
- Majority: 56.2 per cent

Personal details
- Born: 17 August 1985 (age 40) Naracoorte, South Australia
- Party: Labor
- Education: Bachelor of Arts (Journalism)
- Alma mater: University of South Australia
- Website: ALP website

Lucy Penelope Hood (born 17 August 1985) is an Australian politician, journalist and former political adviser. She has been a Labor member of the South Australian House of Assembly since the state election in March 2022, representing Adelaide. With a swing of 7.1 per cent, she defeated the incumbent Liberal Party member, Rachel Sanderson, who had held the seat since 2010. Hood was given the Education Training and Skills portfolio along with the portfolio of Minister for Autism and the newly created Minister for The City of Adelaide in the second Malinauskas Ministry. Hood Previously served as the Minister for Climate, Environment and Water in the First Malinaskus Ministry.

== Early life and education ==
Lucy Penelope Hood was born in August 1985 and grew up in Naracoorte, South Australia and attended Naracoorte Primary School and Naracoorte High School.

She has a Bachelor of Arts (Journalism) from the University of South Australia.

== Career ==
=== Early career ===
Hood has worked in hospitality, as a lifeguard and swimming instructor, and as a journalist for The Advertiser newspaper.

=== Political career ===
Hood worked as a media and then policy advisor, and was a senior adviser to the premier of South Australia, Jay Weatherill, for two years prior to the defeat of the Labor Party in the 2018 state election.

She then worked as political adviser to the then leader of the opposition, Peter Malinauskas, and immediately prior to running as the Labor candidate for Adelaide in the 2022 state election, Hood was Malinauskas' director of policy.

In the 2022 state election held on 19 March 2022, Hood received 56.2 per cent of the two-party-preferred vote (2PP) from 40.6 per cent of the first-preference votes, achieving a swing of 7.1 per cent and defeating the Liberal minister for Child Protection, Rachel Sanderson, who had held the seat since 2010. She was supported in her campaign by the mentorship of the Victorian Minister for Agriculture, Mary-Anne Thomas, through Emily's List Australia. Prior to the election, the ABC election analyst Antony Green stated that results in Adelaide have tracked closely with the seat being won by the party that won the state-wide 2PP at every election since 1985.

Hood has been a member of the parliamentary economic and finance and publishing committees since 3 May 2022, and was a member of the Establishment of Adelaide University Committee from 6 July to 17 November 2023.

On 19 September 2025, in a Cabinet reshuffle following the announcements of retirement by Susan Close and Stephen Mullighan, Hood was promoted to the position of Minister for Climate, Environment and Water. This position is a high-profile one, at a time when the government is tackling a harmful algal bloom around the coast of SA as well as lobbying for Australia's bid to host COP31, a global climate change conference, in Adelaide.

== Personal life ==
Hood married Jarrad Pilkington, a former media adviser to premier Jay Weatherill, and they have two children.

Hood has completed a Certificate IV in Celebrancy, and is an authorised marriage celebrant.

Her brother, Ben Hood, stood as Liberal candidate for the seat of Mount Gambier at the 2022 state election, and in February 2023 he was accepted to fill a vacant Liberal seat in the Legislative Council.

== Footnotes ==
South Australian House of Assembly
Preceded by Rachel Sanderson	Member for Adelaide; 2022–present	Incumbent
