= Clare Scriven =

Australian politician

The Honourable Clare Scriven MLC
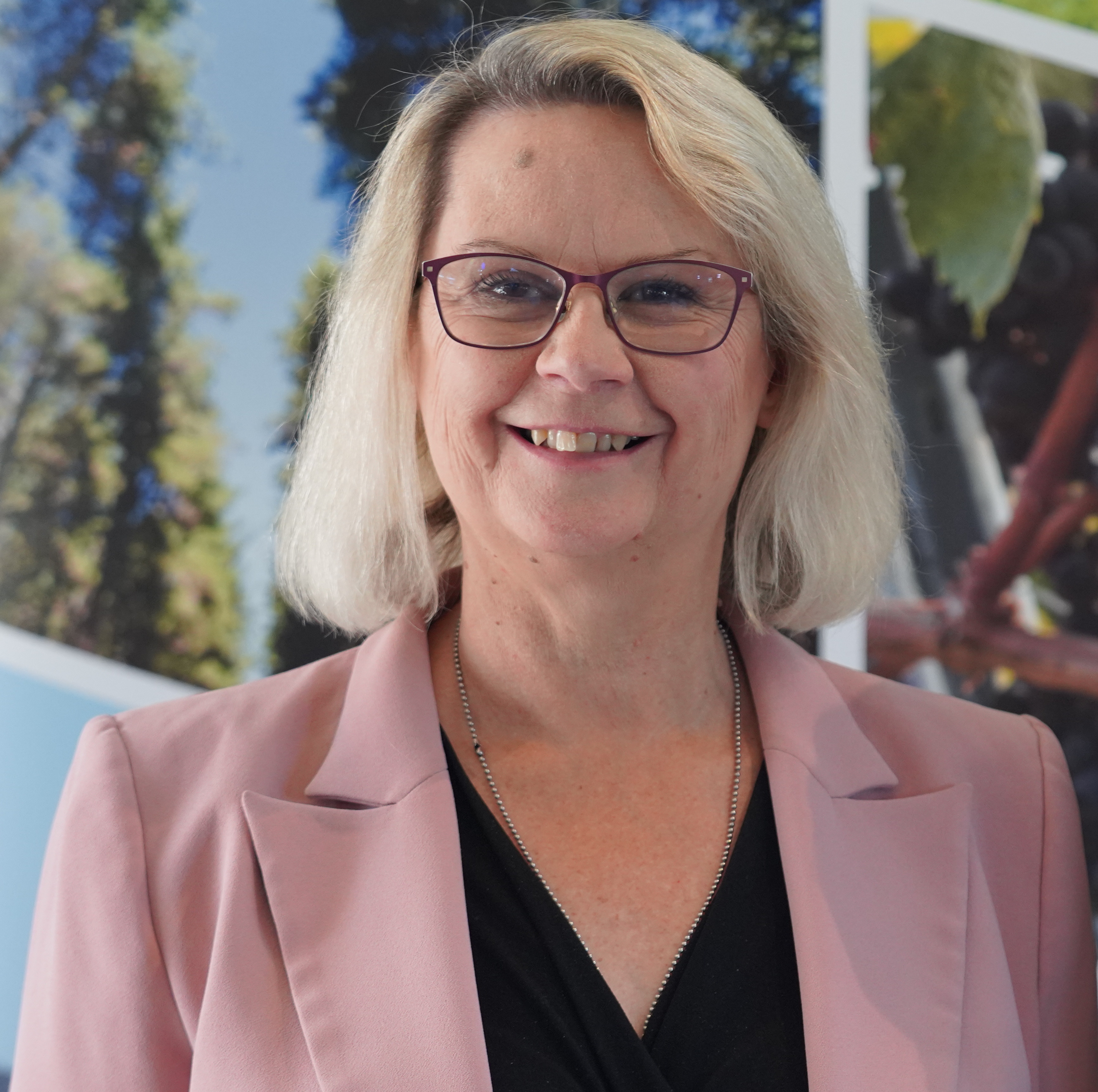
- Scriven in 2026

Minister for Primary Industries and Regional Development
- Incumbent
- Assumed office 24 March 2022
- Premier: Peter Malinauskas
- Preceded by: David Basham

Minister for Forest Industries
- Incumbent
- Assumed office 24 March 2022
- Premier: Peter Malinauskas
- Preceded by: Position created

Member of the South Australian Legislative Council
- Incumbent
- Assumed office 17 March 2018

Personal details
- Party: Labor
- Spouse: Gerard Scriven
- Children: 6
- Education: GDipMgmt, GCertPubSecMgmt
- Alma mater: Flinders University; Australian Institute of Business; Australian Institute of Management
- Occupation: Management professional Politician

Clare Michele Scriven is an Australian politician. She has been a Labor member of the South Australian Legislative Council since the 2018 state election.

== Biography ==
Scriven was raised in Mount Gambier, before living and working in Adelaide for the Australian Electoral Commission from 2007. She later returned to Mount Gambier. She was previously the State Manager of the Australian Forest Products Association, and had post-graduate degrees in management and business. She and her husband Gerard have six children.

Scriven was first elected to parliament at the 2018 South Australian state election, as a Labor representative in the Legislative Council. On 10 April 2018, Scriven was elevated to the Malinauskas Labor shadow cabinet as: Deputy Leader in the Legislative Council, Shadow Minister for Industry & Skills, and Shadow Minister for Forestry. Following the 2022 election, Scriven has served as the Minister for Primary Industries and Regional Development and Minister for Forest Industries in the Malinauskas ministry since March 2022. She was one of the two regional ministers in the cabinet, the other being Independent member Geoff Brock.

In October 2024, Scriven supported amendments proposed by Liberal MP Ben Hood, aimed at restricting late-term abortions. That stance put her at odds with many in her party and with reproductive rights advocates. The amendments would have required women seeking an abortion after 28 weeks to deliver the baby alive for adoption, marking a significant shift from the 2021 legislation that allowed late-term abortions after 22 weeks if medically necessary. The amendments were narrowly defeated, the vote being 9–10. Scriven's support for them underscored internal party divisions on the issue.

At the 2026 state election, Scriven was placed on the fifth position on the Labor Party's ticket in the Legislative Council. While the election was held on 21 March, the result in the upper house took a number of weeks to declare. While Scriven was favoured in the count, the distribution of preferences had not yet confirmed her victory, although she was reappointed to the state cabinet. The results in the Legislative Council were confirmed on 4 May, confirming that Scriven had won re-election to an eight-year term.

== See also ==
- Results of the South Australian state election, 2018 (Legislative Council)

Political offices
Preceded by David Basham	Minister for Primary Industries and Regional Development; 2022–present	Incumbent
New title	Minister for Forest Industries; 2022–present	Incumbent
