= Zoe Bettison =

Australian politician

The Honourable Zoe Bettison MP
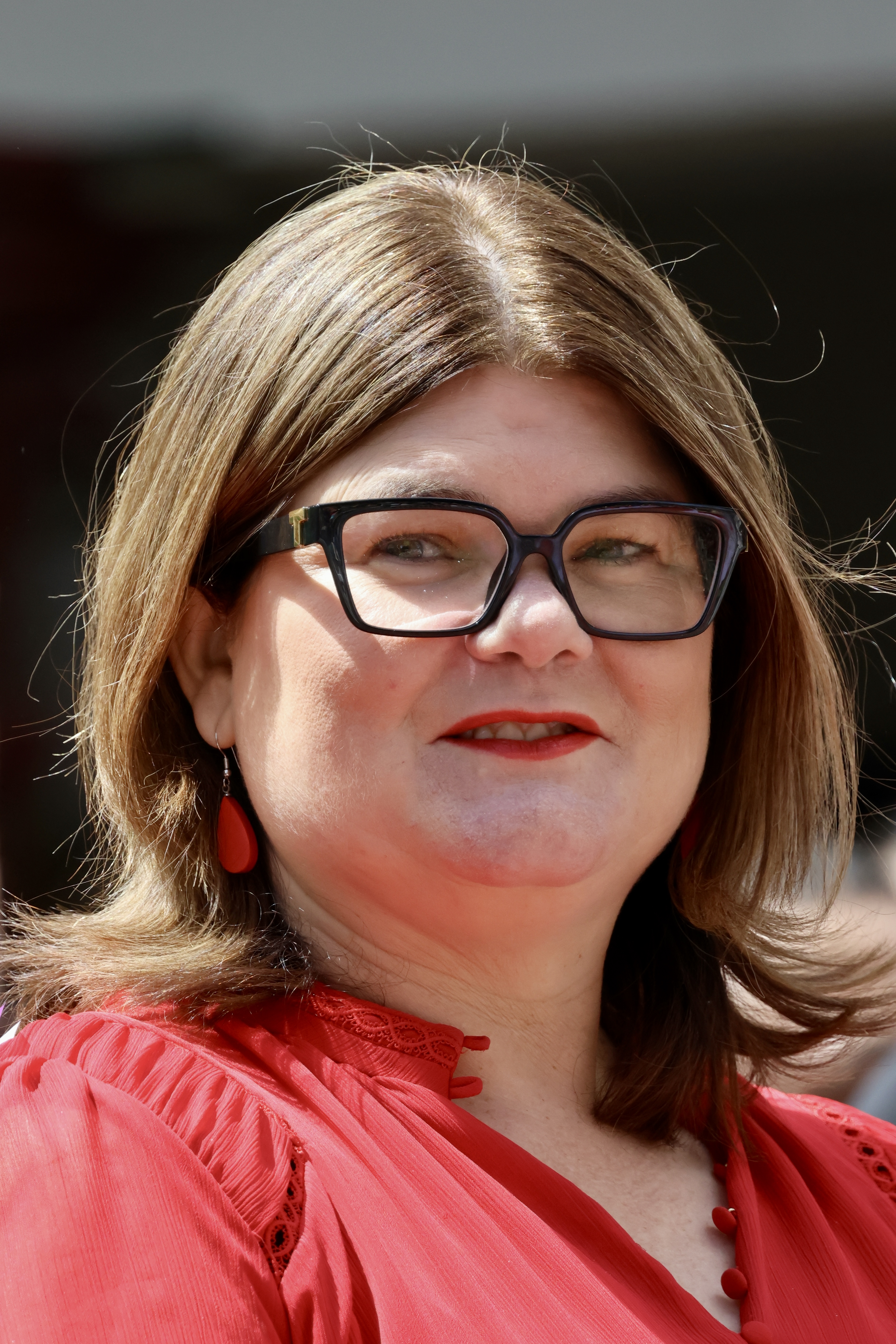
- Bettison in 2025

46th Deputy Speaker and Chairman of Committees of the South Australian House of Assembly
- Incumbent
- Assumed office 5 May 2026
- Preceded by: Tony Piccolo

Minister for Tourism
- In office 24 March 2022 – 25 March 2026
- Premier: Peter Malinauskas
- Preceded by: Steven Marshall (as Premier)
- Succeeded by: Emily Bourke

Minister for Multicultural Affairs
- In office 24 March 2022 – 25 March 2026
- Premier: Peter Malinauskas
- Preceded by: Jennifer Rankine 2018
- Succeeded by: Nadia Clancy

Member of the South Australian House of Assembly for Ramsay
- Incumbent
- Assumed office 11 February 2012
- Preceded by: Mike Rann

Personal details
- Party: Labor
- Education: Flinders University, University of Adelaide
- Profession: Union official
- Website: www.zoebettison.com.au

Zoe Lee Bettison is an Australian politician who has served as a member of the South Australian House of Assembly seat of Ramsay representing South Australian Labor since the 2012 Ramsay by-election.

Bettison is the current Deputy Speaker and Chairman of Committees of the South Australian House of Assembly and previously served as the Minister for Tourism and Minister for Multicultural Affairs in the First Malinauskas ministry from 2022 to 2026. She has also previously served in other ministerial roles in the Weatherill ministry between 2014 and 2018.

== Career ==
Bettison held positions with Great Southern Rail, and within the Australian Labor Party.

She was formerly a union official for the Shop, Distributive and Allied Employees Association, and was a director of political lobbying firm Hawker Britton.

== Political career ==
Bettison was aligned with Labor's Right faction.

The 2012 Ramsay by-election was held after the resignation of Labor incumbent and former Premier Mike Rann. Bettison easily retained the seat. She was re-elected with an increased margin at the 2014 election. In March 2014 she became Minister for Communities and Social Inclusion, Minister for Social Housing, Minister for Multicultural Affairs, Minister for Ageing, Minister for Youth, Minister for Veterans Affairs and Minister for Volunteers in the Weatherill Labor cabinet. Between 2014 and the 2018 state election Bettison has also served as the minister with responsibility for a range of portfolios, including communities and social inclusion, social housing, the status of women, ageing, multicultural affairs, youth, volunteers.

After Labor won the 2022 election, Bettison was appointed as Minister for Tourism and Minister for Cultural Affairs in the Malinauskas ministry.

On 2 September 2022, as Minister for Multicultural Affairs, Bettison said that there would be a Parliamentary inquiry into "neo-Nazi symbols, the activities of extremist groups, discrimination faced by targeted groups and the prohibition on symbols in other states". This was partly prompted by the activities of a group of neo-Nazis who had posted photographs of themselves giving fascist salutes outside the Adelaide Holocaust Museum, and concerns had been raised about the activities of groups such as the National Socialist Network in South Australia.

Parliament of South Australia
Preceded by Mike Rann	Member for Ramsay; 2012–present	Incumbent
Political offices
Preceded by Jack Snelling	Minister for Veterans' Affairs; 2014	Succeeded by Martin Hamilton-Smith
Preceded by Jack Snelling	Minister for Ageing; 2014–2018	Succeeded by Michelle Lensink as Minister for Human Services
Preceded by Jennifer Rankine	Minister for Multicultural Affairs; 2014–2018	Succeeded by Michelle Lensink as Minister for Human Services
Preceded by Tony Piccolo	Minister for Social Housing; Minister for Youth; Minister for Communities and Social Inclusion; Minister for Volunteers; 2014–2018	Succeeded by Michelle Lensink as Minister for Human Services
Preceded by Steven Marshall as Premier of South Australia	Minister for Tourism; 2022–2026	Succeeded by Emily Bourke
New title	Minister for Multicultural Affairs; 2022–2026	Succeeded by Nadia Clancy
