= Chris Picton =

Australian politician (born 1983)

The Honourable Chris Picton MP
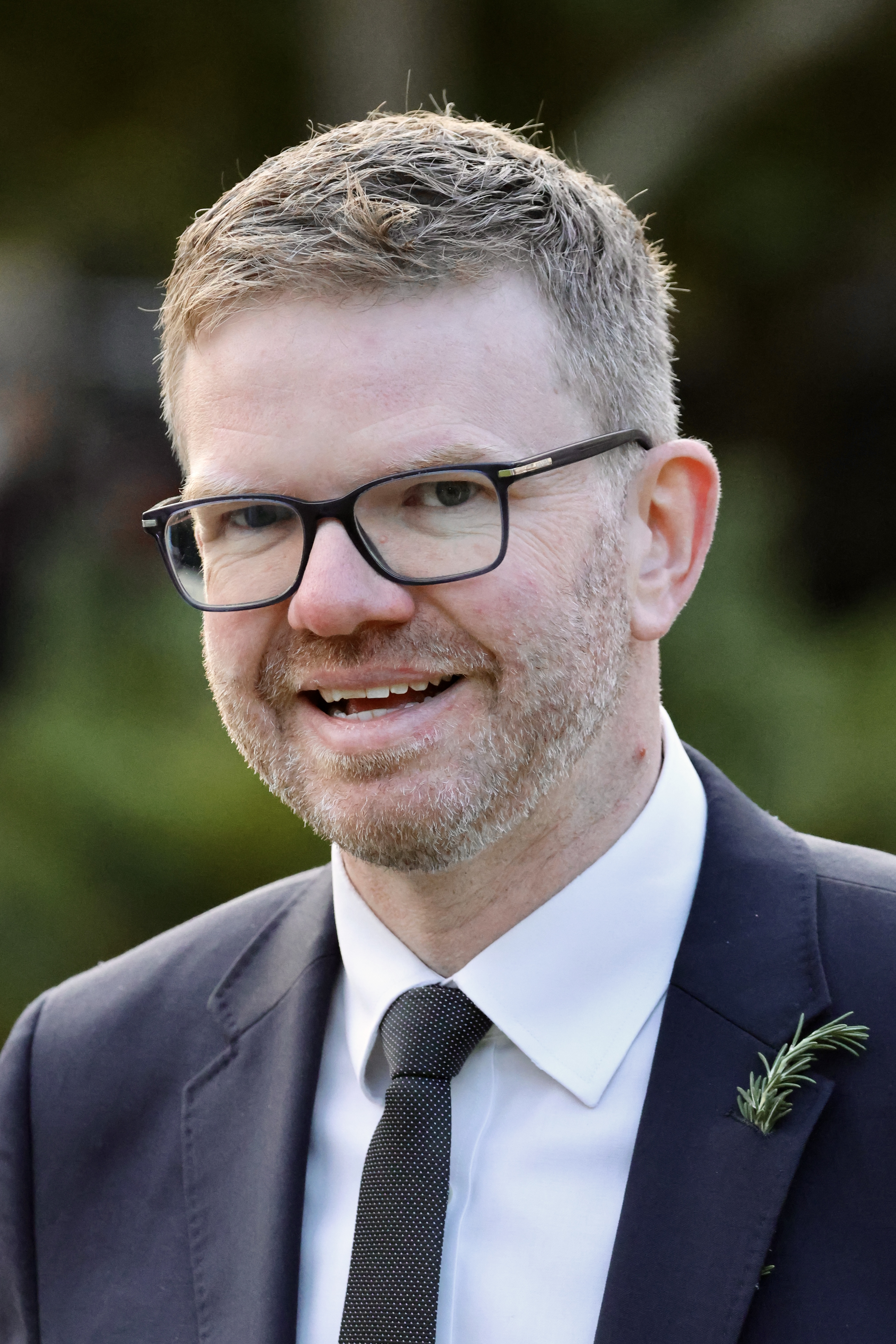
- Picton at the National War Memorial in 2026

Minister for State Development
- Incumbent
- Assumed office 25 March 2026
- Premier: Peter Malinauskas
- Preceded by: New office

Minister for Artificial Intelligence and Digital Economy
- Incumbent
- Assumed office 25 March 2026
- Premier: Peter Malinauskas
- Preceded by: Michael Brown (as Assistant Minister to the Premier for Artificial Intelligence and Digital Economy)

Minister for Defence and Space Industries
- Incumbent
- Assumed office 25 March 2026
- Premier: Peter Malinauskas
- Preceded by: Peter Malinauskas

Minister for Veterans Affairs
- Incumbent
- Assumed office 25 March 2026
- Premier: Peter Malinauskas
- Preceded by: Joe Szakacs

Minister for Health and Wellbeing
- In office 24 March 2022 – 25 March 2026
- Premier: Peter Malinauskas
- Preceded by: Stephen Wade
- Succeeded by: Blair Boyer

Member of the South Australian House of Assembly for Kaurna
- Incumbent
- Assumed office 15 March 2014
- Preceded by: John Hill

Personal details
- Born: Christopher James Picton; 13 January 1983 (age 43) South Australia
- Party: Labor
- Website: chrispicton.com.au

Christopher James Picton (born 13 January 1983) is an Australian politician representing the South Australian House of Assembly seat of Kaurna for the South Australian Labor Party since the 2014 state election. After the March 2026 state election, Picton was appointed Minister for four portfolios: Artificial Intelligence and Digital Economy; Defence and Space Industries; State Development; and Veterans' Affairs.

== Early life and education ==
Christopher James Picton was born on 13 January 1983 in South Australia.

Picton attended public schools in Adelaide, and graduated with a Bachelor of Laws and Legal Practice and Bachelor of Arts from Flinders University.

== Early career ==
Picton was admitted as a barrister and solicitor in the Supreme Court of South Australia.

He was chief of staff for his parliamentary predecessor John Hill, and later a staffer for Nicola Roxon, the federal Minister for Health and Attorney-General. He also served as an associate director at Deloitte Access Economics.

== Political career ==
Picton was elected to the South Australian House of Assembly on 15 Mar 2014, as a representative of the South Australian Labor Party. He was appointed as a member of the Cabinet of South Australia in September 2017 as Minister for Police, Minister for Correctional Services, Minister for Emergency Services, and Minister for Road Safety, until Labor lost the 2018 state election on 19 March 2018. He was also convenor of SA Labor's Policy Platform Committee.

After Labor won the 2022 state election, Picton was appointed as Minister for Health and Wellbeing in the Malinauskas ministry, previously having shadowed the role while in opposition. As health minister, he had to answer questions about ambulance ramping as well as issuing an apology for a government emailing error that led to the breach of privacy of a patient.

After the 2026 state election, on 25 March 2026 Picton was appointed Minister for Artificial Intelligence and Digital Economy, Defence and Space Industries, State Development, and Veterans' Affairs. In his role as Minister for State Development, he is responsible for developing the state's economy, at the time when there is a global fuel crisis owing to the 2026 Iran war. Soon after his appointment, he had a meeting with the Australia India Council to discuss trade as well as the former US ambassador to Australia, to discuss space and artificial intelligence.

== Personal life ==
Picton married Connie Blefari, and they have three children. He is a fan of AFL team the Adelaide Crows, and does volunteer surf life saving at Moana Beach.

Picton's brother is Tim Picton, who died in January 2026 at the age of 36 following a fatal punch. Tim was an electoral strategist for the Western Australian Labor Party in the 2021 state election.

South Australian House of Assembly
Preceded by John Hill	Member for Kaurna; 2014–present	Incumbent
Political offices
Preceded by Peter Malinauskas	Minister for Police; 2017–2018	Succeeded by Corey Wingard as Minister for Police, Emergency Services and Correctional Services
Preceded by Peter Malinauskas	Minister for Correctional Services; 2017–2018	Succeeded by Corey Wingard as Minister for Police, Emergency Services and Correctional Services
Preceded by Peter Malinauskas	Minister for Emergency Services; 2017–2018	Succeeded by Corey Wingard as Minister for Police, Emergency Services and Correctional Services
Preceded by Peter Malinauskas	Minister for Road Safety; 2017–2018	Succeeded by Corey Wingard as Minister for Police, Emergency Services and Correctional Services
Preceded by Stephen Wade	Minister for Health and Wellbeing; 2022–2026	Succeeded by Blair Boyer
New office	Minister for State Development; 2026–present	Incumbent
Preceded by Michael Brown as Assistant Minister to the Premier for Artificial Intelligence and Digital Economy	Minister for Artificial Intelligence and Digital Economy; 2026–present	Incumbent
Preceded by Peter Malinauskas	Minister for Defence and Space Industries; 2026–present	Incumbent
Preceded by Joe Szakacs	Minister for Veterans' Affairs; 2026–present	Incumbent
