= Emily Bourke =

Australian politician

The Honourable Emily Bourke MLC
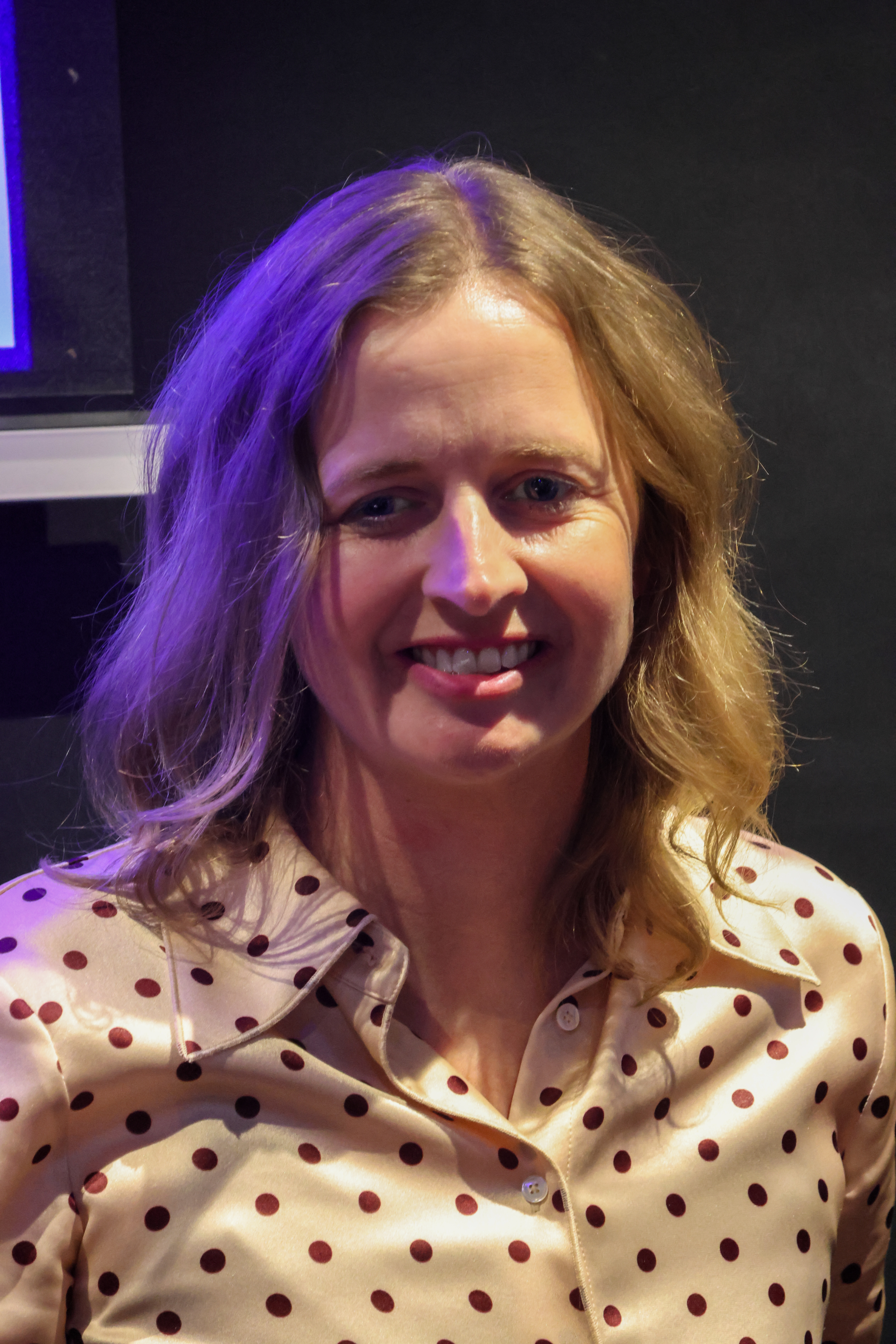
- Bourke in 2026

Minister for Climate, Environment and Water
- Incumbent
- Assumed office 25 March 2026
- Preceded by: Lucy Hood

Minister for Tourism
- Incumbent
- Assumed office 25 March 2026
- Preceded by: Zoe Bettison

Minister for Infrastructure and Transport
- In office 19 September 2025 – 25 March 2026
- Preceded by: Tom Koutsantonis
- Succeeded by: Joe Szakacs

Minister for Emergency Services & Correctional Services
- In office 29 January 2025 – 19 September 2025
- Preceded by: Joe Szakacs
- Succeeded by: Rhiannon Pearce

Minister for Autism
- In office 29 January 2025 – 25 March 2026
- Preceded by: Position established
- Succeeded by: Lucy Hood

Minister for Recreation, Sport and Racing
- In office 29 January 2025 – 19 September 2025
- Preceded by: Katrine Hildyard
- Succeeded by: Rhiannon Pearce

Parliamentary Secretary to the Premier
- In office 24 March 2022 – 29 January 2025
- Premier: Peter Malinauskas
- Preceded by: Jing Lee
- Succeeded by: Michael Brown

Member of the South Australian Legislative Council
- Incumbent
- Assumed office 17 March 2018

Personal details
- Born: 1982 (age 43–44) Maitland, South Australia
- Party: Australian Labor Party
- Spouse: Aemon Bourke
- Children: 3 daughters

Emily Sarah Bourke (born 1982) is an Australian politician. She has been a Labor member of the South Australian Legislative Council since the 2018 state election.

Bourke previously worked as a staffer for Premier Jay Weatherill. She was elevated to the top position on Labor's Legislative Council ticket by the Right faction after Leesa Vlahos withdrew.

After Labor won government at the 2022 state election, Bourke was appointed by new Premier Peter Malinauskas to Cabinet as Assistant Minister to the Premier. In August 2022, she was appointed the assistant minister for autism.

Following the resignation of Dan Cregan, Bourke was promoted to Cabinet, elevating the Autism portfolio and taking on Emergency Services and Correctional Services, and Recreation, Sport and Racing.

== Early and personal life ==
Bourke was born and grew up on a farm near Maitland on Yorke Peninsula. She studied in Adelaide then moved back to Yorke Peninsula to work for the Yorke Peninsula Country Times. She married Aemon Bourke and they live in Adelaide with three daughters.

== Notes ==
a.Officially Parliamentary Secretary, but known unofficially as Assistant Minister.
