= Michael Brown (Australian politician) =

Australian politician

The Honourable Michael Brown MP
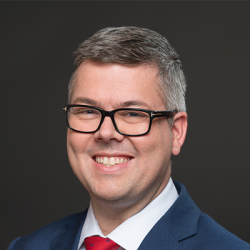
- Brown in 2025

Minister for Police
- Incumbent
- Assumed office 25 March 2026
- Premier: Peter Malinauskas
- Preceded by: Blair Boyer

Minister for Correctional Services
- Incumbent
- Assumed office 25 March 2026
- Premier: Peter Malinauskas
- Preceded by: Rhiannon Pearce (as Minister for Emergency Service and Correctional Services)

Minister for Consumer and Business Affairs
- Incumbent
- Assumed office 25 March 2026
- Premier: Peter Malinauskas
- Preceded by: Andrea Michaels

Member of the South Australian House of Assembly for Florey
- Incumbent
- Assumed office 19 March 2022
- Preceded by: Frances Bedford

Member of the South Australian House of Assembly for Playford
- In office 17 March 2018 – 19 March 2022
- Preceded by: Jack Snelling
- Succeeded by: John Fulbrook

Personal details
- Born: 1970s
- Party: Labor
- Spouse: Victoria Brown
- Children: 3
- Profession: Political staffer, computer programmer

Michael Edison Brown is an Australian politician. He has been a Labor member of the South Australian House of Assembly since the 2018 state election. He represented Playford from 2018 to 2022 after which he transferred to Florey at the 2022 state election. He has served as the Minister for Police, Minister for Correctional Services and Minister for Consumer and Business Affairs in the second Malinauskas ministry since March 2026.

== Early life ==
Brown was born in the mid-1970s at Modbury Hospital in Adelaide's North Eastern suburbs and soon after was placed into state care. He has never known his biological parents and was adopted by Dennis and Lois Brown, an Adelaide couple.

Brown attended Marion High School between 1998 and 1992, finishing his final year at Hamilton Secondary College in 1993.

== Early career ==
At the age of 15, while attending school, Brown started working at a local restaurant Sizzler. After leaving school in 1993, he worked as an Administrative Officer with the Australian Government until he gained a position as a computer programmer at Adelaide-based Neller Software in 1996. Between 1998 and 2002, he worked as an Electorate Officer to an Australian Labor politician before beginning a position in 2002 as a Ministerial Adviser to the then-Treasurer of South Australia, Kevin Foley.

In 2005, Brown was elected to the position of State Secretary of the South Australian Labor Party, a position he was successively re-elected to until 2011, when he began work as the Chief Executive of Griffins Lawyers.

In 2013, Brown returned to work for the South Australian Labor Government as a Ministerial Adviser to the then-Minister for Finance, Michael O'Brien, and in 2016, he was appointed as the Chief of Staff to the then-Minister for Social Inclusion, Chloe Fox, a position he remained in until being elected to the South Australian Parliament in 2018.

== Political career ==
At the 2018 South Australian State Election, Brown ran as the Labor candidate for the Northern Suburbs seat of Playford, replacing the incumbent Labor MP, Jack Snelling. Brown won the seat with 66.3% of the two-party-preferred vote with a 4.6% swing to Labor.

Between the 2018 and 2022 state elections, Brown was the Parliamentary Labor Party's Opposition Whip and served on several Parliamentary Committees, including the Environment, Resources and Development Committee.

In August 2021, around seven months before the 2022 South Australian State Election, Brown confirmed his intention not to contest his then-current seat in the electorate of Playford but instead contest the electorate of Florey. This followed an electoral boundaries redistribution, which saw around 12,000 voters in the suburbs of Para Hills, Para Hills West, and Parafield move from Playford to Florey. Brown was elected to the seat for Florey at the 2022 State Election with 62.8% of the vote; replacing the incumbent Frances Bedford who chose to contest another seat following the redistribution of seats.

Following the 2022 election, Brown served on several Parliamentary Committees, including as the Chair of the Select Committee on Artificial Intelligence and as a member of the Committee on the Establishment of Adelaide University. In January 2025, following the elevation of Emily Bourke to the Ministry, Brown was appointed the Parliamentary Secretary to the Premier (a position which is unofficially referred to as an Assistant Minister). Brown's portfolio areas cover Artificial Intelligence (AI) and the Digital Economy.

After the Labor landslide election in 2026, Brown was promoted to the cabinet as Minister for Police, Minister for Correctional Services and Minister for Consumer and Business Affairs in the second Malinauskas ministry.

Brown is a member of the Australian Labor Party's socially conservative Labor Right faction, Unity. Christian groups have applauded Brown for his socially conservative values throughout his parliamentary career, in particular in speaking and voting against legislation relating to issues such as abortion. However, Brown has supported a number of legislative reforms in this area, including voting to support the establishment of Safe Access Zones around abortion sites in South Australia.

== Personal life ==
Brown lives in the suburb of Mawson Lakes, which is within his electorate of Florey in Adelaide's northern suburbs, with his wife, Victoria, and their three daughters, Elizabeth, Alice, and Holly.

As a former IT professional, Michael has a particular interest in technology and Artificial Intelligence, particularly with regard to their role in economic development and their social impact. In his spare time, Michael enjoys reading a good book and spending quality time with his family. Brown lists himself as a Trustee of Brownliht Trust.

Brown is a Member of the Australian Labor Party and the Labor Right faction, Unity, and has been a member of the Australian Trade Union, Shop, Distributive and Allied Employees Association since he began working at the age of 15.

South Australian House of Assembly
Preceded by Jack Snelling	Member for Playford; 2018–2022	Succeeded by John Fulbrook
Preceded by Frances Bedford	Member for Florey; 2022–present	Incumbent
Political offices
Preceded by Blair Boyer	Minister for Police; 2026–present	Incumbent
Preceded by Rhiannon Pearce as Minister for Emergency Service and Correctional Services	Minister for Correctional Services; 2026–present	Incumbent
Preceded by Andrea Michaels	Minister for Consumer and Business Affairs; 2026–present	Incumbent
