= Electoral results for the district of Stuart =

South Australian district election results

This is a list of electoral results for the Electoral district of Stuart in South Australian state elections.

== Members for Stuart ==
Member	Party	Term
Lindsay Riches	Labor	1938–1970
Gavin Keneally	Labor	1970–1989
Colleen Hutchison	Labor	1989–1993
Graham Gunn	Liberal	1997–2010
Dan van Holst Pellekaan	Liberal	2010–2022
Geoff Brock	Independent	2022–present

== Election results ==
=== Elections in the 2020s ===
==== 2026 ====
2026 South Australian state election: Stuart
Party	Candidate	Votes	%	±%
Independent	Geoff Brock	8,603	38.4	+1.7
One Nation	Brandon Turton	6,236	27.8	+21.3
Liberal	Leon Stephens	3,836	17.1	−14.9
Labor	David Ewings	1,988	8.9	−9.4
Greens	Poppy Pilmore	875	3.9	+1.2
Legalise Cannabis	Jessica McKinnon	473	2.1	+2.1
Australian Family	Stephen Tonkin	219	1.0	+1.0
Animal Justice	Robyn Parnell	180	0.8	+0.8
Total formal votes		22,410	96.8	−0.8
Informal votes		733	3.2	+0.8
Turnout		23,143	81.4	−5.6
Two-candidate-preferred result
Independent	Geoff Brock	12,757	56.9	−10.2
One Nation	Brandon Turton	9,653	43.1	+43.1
Independent hold		Swing	−10.2	

==== 2022 ====
2022 South Australian state election: Stuart
Party	Candidate	Votes	%	±%
Independent	Geoff Brock	10,396	48.5	+13.8
Liberal	Dan van Holst Pellekaan	6,079	28.3	−15.9
Labor	Andrew Wright	3,124	14.6	−0.8
One Nation	David Stone	1,192	5.5	+5.5
Greens	Beth Leese	660	3.1	−1.0
Total formal votes		21,451	97.6	
Informal votes		525	2.4	
Turnout		21,976	87.0	
Notional two-party-preferred count
Labor	Andrew Wright	10,900	50.8	+14.7
Liberal	Dan van Holst Pellekaan	10,551	49.2	−14.7
Two-candidate-preferred result
Independent	Geoff Brock	14,403	67.1	+67.1
Liberal	Dan van Holst Pellekaan	7,048	32.9	−28.7
Independent gain from Liberal				

Distribution of preferences: Stuart
Party	Candidate	Votes	Round 1		Round 2		Round 3	
Party	Candidate	Votes	Dist.	Total				
Quota (50% + 1)		10,726						
Independent	Geoff Brock	10,396	+260	10,656	+667	11,323	+3,080	14,403
Liberal	Dan van Holst Pellekaan	6,079	+101	6,180	+265	6,445	+603	7,048
Labor	Andrew Wright	3,124	+220	3,344	+339	3,683	Excluded	
One Nation	David Stone	1,192	+79	1,271	Excluded			
Greens	Beth Leese	660	Excluded					

=== Elections in the 2010s ===
==== 2018 ====
2018 South Australian state election: Stuart
Party	Candidate	Votes	%	±%
Liberal	Dan van Holst Pellekaan	14,157	69.7	+5.5
Labor	Khatija Thomas	4,698	23.1	+0.0
Greens	Brendan Fitzgerald	1,460	7.2	+2.4
Total formal votes		20,315	96.9	−0.6
Informal votes		646	3.1	+0.6
Turnout		20,961	89.5	−2.1
Two-party-preferred result
Liberal	Dan van Holst Pellekaan	14,847	73.1	+3.0
Labor	Khatija Thomas	5,468	26.9	−3.0
Liberal hold		Swing	+3.0	

2014 South Australian state election: Stuart
Party	Candidate	Votes	%	±%
Liberal	Dan van Holst Pellekaan	13,806	65.7	+13.3
Labor	Josh Vines	5,051	24.0	−11.7
Family First	Sylvia Holland	1,128	5.4	+0.8
Greens	Brendan Fitzgerald	1,035	4.9	+0.0
Total formal votes		21,020	97.5	+0.4
Informal votes		550	2.5	−0.4
Turnout		21,570	91.4	−0.6
Two-party-preferred result
Liberal	Dan van Holst Pellekaan	14,812	70.5	+12.8
Labor	Josh Vines	6,208	29.5	−12.8
Liberal hold		Swing	+12.8	

2010 South Australian state election: Stuart
Party	Candidate	Votes	%	±%
Liberal	Dan van Holst Pellekaan	10,929	52.4	+6.7
Labor	Sean Holden	7,455	35.8	−8.0
Greens	Jane Alcorn	1,019	4.9	+1.3
Family First	Sylvia Holland	951	4.6	+0.0
Independent	Rob Williams	497	2.4	+2.4
Total formal votes		20,851	97.0	
Informal votes		624	3.0	
Turnout		21,475	92.0	
Two-party-preferred result
Liberal	Dan van Holst Pellekaan	12,015	57.6	+7.1
Labor	Sean Holden	8,836	42.4	−7.1
Liberal hold		Swing	+7.1	

=== Elections in the 2000s ===
2006 South Australian state election: Stuart
Party	Candidate	Votes	%	±%
Liberal	Graham Gunn	9,441	45.7	−0.4
Labor	Justin Jarvis	9,021	43.7	+3.4
Family First	Greg Patrick	943	4.6	+4.6
Greens	Jane Alcorn	737	3.6	+3.6
Democrats	Bruce Lennon	353	1.7	−2.2
Independent	Simon Cook	142	0.7	+0.7
Total formal votes		20,637	96.9	−0.8
Informal votes		669	3.1	+0.8
Turnout		21,306	91.9	−2.0
Two-party-preferred result
Liberal	Graham Gunn	10,435	50.6	−0.7
Labor	Justin Jarvis	10,202	49.4	+0.7
Liberal hold		Swing	−0.7	

2002 South Australian state election: Stuart
Party	Candidate	Votes	%	±%
Liberal	Graham Gunn	9,072	46.1	+1.2
Labor	Justin Jarvis	7,945	40.3	+4.0
One Nation	Sandra Wauchope	1,461	7.4	+7.4
Democrats	Bruce Lennon	764	3.9	−8.4
Independent	David Moore	452	2.3	+2.3
Total formal votes		19,694	97.7	
Informal votes		469	2.3	
Turnout		20,163	93.9	
Two-party-preferred result
Liberal	Graham Gunn	10,099	51.3	−1.4
Labor	Justin Jarvis	9,595	48.7	+1.4
Liberal hold		Swing	−1.4	

=== Elections in the 1990s ===
1997 South Australian state election: Stuart
Party	Candidate	Votes	%	±%
Liberal	Graham Gunn	8,203	44.0	−4.6
Labor	Ben Browne	7,039	37.8	+3.6
Democrats	Nick Weetman	2,264	12.1	+7.9
Independent	Vince Coulthard	1,135	6.1	+6.1
Total formal votes		18,641	96.9	−0.9
Informal votes		592	3.1	+0.9
Turnout		19,233	91.2	
Two-party-preferred result
Liberal	Graham Gunn	9,602	51.5	−7.5
Labor	Ben Browne	9,039	48.5	+7.5
Liberal hold		Swing	−7.5	

=== Elections in the 1980s ===
1989 South Australian state election: Stuart
Party	Candidate	Votes	%	±%
Labor	Colleen Hutchison	8,573	48.9	−18.6
Independent	Joy Baluch	3,857	22.0	+22.0
Liberal	Simon Dawson	2,517	14.4	−10.5
Call to Australia	David Squirrell	1,691	9.6	+9.6
Democrats	Kaye Matthews	887	5.1	+1.9
Total formal votes		17,525	97.3	+4.3
Informal votes		482	2.7	−4.3
Turnout		18,007	94.0	+1.0
Two-party-preferred result
Labor	Colleen Hutchison	11,917	68.0	−4.0
Liberal	Simon Dawson	5,608	32.0	+4.0
Two-candidate-preferred result
Labor	Colleen Hutchison	9,853	56.2	−15.8
Independent	Joy Baluch	7,672	43.8	+43.8
Labor hold		Swing	N/A	

1985 South Australian state election: Stuart
Party	Candidate	Votes	%	±%
Labor	Gavin Keneally	11,164	67.5	−2.5
Liberal	Bob Smith	4,130	24.9	+3.0
Independent	Peter Clark	728	4.4	+4.4
Democrats	Harm Folkers	526	3.2	−4.8
Total formal votes		16,548	93.0	
Informal votes		1,237	7.0	
Turnout		17,785	94.2	
Two-party-preferred result
Labor	Gavin Keneally	11,920	72.0	−2.0
Liberal	Bob Smith	4,628	28.0	+2.0
Labor hold		Swing	−2.0	

1982 South Australian state election: Stuart
Party	Candidate	Votes	%	±%
Labor	Gavin Keneally	10,403	66.6	−0.4
Liberal	Sydney Cheesman	3,865	24.7	−8.3
Democrats	David Chapman	1,364	8.7	+8.7
Total formal votes		15,632	92.8	−2.5
Informal votes		1,212	7.2	+2.5
Turnout		16,844	93.9	−0.3
Two-party-preferred result
Labor	Gavin Keneally	10,942	70.0	+3.1
Liberal	Sydney Cheesman	4,690	30.0	−3.1
Labor hold		Swing	+3.1	

=== Elections in the 1970s ===
1979 South Australian state election: Stuart
Party	Candidate	Votes	%	±%
Labor	Gavin Keneally	10,236	67.0	−6.9
Liberal	Sydney Cheeseman	5,054	33.0	+6.9
Total formal votes		15,290	95.3	−1.3
Informal votes		760	4.7	+1.3
Turnout		16,050	94.2	+0.2
Labor hold		Swing	−6.9	

1977 South Australian state election: Stuart
Party	Candidate	Votes	%	±%
Labor	Gavin Keneally	11,295	73.9	+27.0
Liberal	Colin Struck	3,985	26.1	+14.3
Total formal votes		15,280	96.6	
Informal votes		530	3.4	
Turnout		15,810	94.0	
Labor hold		Swing	N/A	

1975 South Australian state election: Stuart
Party	Candidate	Votes	%	±%
Labor	Gavin Keneally	8,847	69.0	−12.2
Liberal	Brian Kinnear	2,781	21.7	+21.7
Liberal Movement	Brenda Groves	1,202	9.3	+9.3
Total formal votes		12,830	94.2	+1.3
Informal votes		794	5.8	−1.3
Turnout		13,624	92.7	+2.3
Two-party-preferred result
Labor	Gavin Keneally	8,968	69.9	−11.3
Liberal	Brian Kinnear	3,862	30.1	+30.1
Labor hold		Swing	N/A	

1973 South Australian state election: Stuart
Party	Candidate	Votes	%	±%
Labor	Gavin Keneally	8,702	81.2	+5.2
Independent	George Rogers	2,012	18.8	+18.8
Total formal votes		10,714	92.9	−4.2
Informal votes		822	7.1	+4.2
Turnout		11,536	90.4	−2.3
Labor hold		Swing	N/A	

1970 South Australian state election: Stuart
Party	Candidate	Votes	%	±%
Labor	Gavin Keneally	7,080	76.0	
Liberal and Country	Richard Mould	2,238	24.0	
Total formal votes		9,318	97.1	
Informal votes		279	2.9	
Turnout		9,597	92.7	
Labor hold		Swing		

=== Elections in the 1960s ===
1968 South Australian state election: Stuart
Party	Candidate	Votes	%	±%
Labor	Lindsay Riches	6,002	73.9	−13.8
Liberal and Country	Robert Semmens	2,124	26.1	+26.1
Total formal votes		8,126	98.0	+2.3
Informal votes		169	2.0	−2.3
Turnout		8,295	93.8	+0.7
Labor hold		Swing	N/A	

1965 South Australian state election: Stuart
Party	Candidate	Votes	%	±%
Labor	Lindsay Riches	6,618	87.7	−0.3
Independent	William Young	926	12.3	+12.3
Total formal votes		7,544	95.7	−0.7
Informal votes		336	4.3	+0.7
Turnout		7,880	93.1	−0.2
Labor hold		Swing	−0.3	

1962 South Australian state election: Stuart
Party	Candidate	Votes	%	±%
Labor	Lindsay Riches	6,496	88.0	−0.4
Independent	James Yates	889	12.0	+0.4
Total formal votes		7,385	96.4	+0.3
Informal votes		272	3.6	−0.3
Turnout		7,657	93.3	−0.1
Labor hold		Swing	−0.4	
