= Yalata (disambiguation) =

Yalata may refer to:

== Places ==
=== Australia ===
- Fowlers Bay, South Australia, a town formerly known as Yalata
  - Fowlers Bay, the bay on which the town of Fowlers Bay, South Australia is situated
  - Yalata Station, a former pastoral lease associated with Fowlers Bay, South Australia
- Yalata Indigenous Protected Area, a protected area in South Australia
- Yalata, South Australia, an Aboriginal community on the Nullarbor Plain
  - Yalata Anangu School, an Aboriginal school in Yalata
  - Yalata Mission Airport, a regional airport serving Yalata community

=== Elsewhere ===
- Yalata, a crater on the planet Mars

== Other uses ==
- Yalata, a ketch operated by the Royal Australian Air Force Marine Section
- Yalata mallee or Eucalyptus yalatensis, a species of Eucalyptus tree found in Western Australia

== See also ==
- Yatala (disambiguation) for a common misspelling
