= Geoff Brock =

Australian politician (born 1950)

The Honourable Geoff Brock JP MP
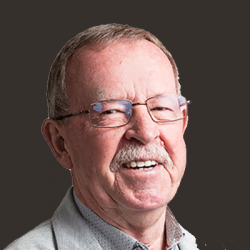
- Brock in 2022

Minister for Regional Roads
- In office 24 March 2022 – 15 April 2024
- Premier: Peter Malinauskas
- Preceded by: New office
- Succeeded by: Vacant

Minister for Veterans Affairs
- In office 24 March 2022 – 15 April 2024
- Premier: Peter Malinauskas
- Preceded by: Steven Marshall
- Succeeded by: Joe Szakacs

Minister for Local Government
- In office 24 March 2022 – 15 April 2024
- Premier: Peter Malinauskas
- Preceded by: Josh Teague (as Minister for Planning and Local Government)
- Succeeded by: Joe Szakacs
- In office 26 March 2014 – 19 March 2018
- Premier: Jay Weatherill
- Preceded by: Gail Gago (as Minister for State / Local Government Relations)
- Succeeded by: Stephan Knoll (as Minister for Transport, Infrastructure and Local Government)

Minister for Regional Development
- In office 26 March 2014 – 19 March 2018
- Premier: Jay Weatherill
- Preceded by: Gail Gago
- Succeeded by: Tim Whetstone (as Minister for Primary Industries and Regional Development)

Member of the South Australian House of Assembly for Stuart
- Incumbent
- Assumed office 19 March 2022
- Preceded by: Dan van Holst Pellekaan

Member of the South Australian House of Assembly for Frome
- In office 17 January 2009 – 19 March 2022
- Preceded by: Rob Kerin
- Succeeded by: Penny Pratt

Mayor of Port Pirie
- In office 12 May 2003 – January 2009
- Preceded by: Ken Madigan
- Succeeded by: Brenton Vanstone

Councillor on the Port Pirie City Council (Note: The City of Port Pirie amalgamated with the District Council of Pirie on 1 July 1996 to become the Port Pirie City and District Council.)
- In office May 1989 – 17 March 1997

Councillor on the Port Pirie Regional Council (Note: The Port Pirie City and District Council amalgamated with the District Council of Crystal Brook-Redhill on 17 March 1997 to become the Port Pirie City and Districts Council. A name change to Port Pirie Regional Council occurred on 1 July 1998.)
- In office 17 March 1997 – January 2009

Personal details
- Born: Geoffrey Graeme Brock; 1950 (age 75–76) Frankston, Victoria, Australia
- Party: Independent
- Website: geoffbrock.com.au

Geoffrey Graeme Brock (born 1950) is an Australian politician. He is an independent member in the South Australian House of Assembly, representing the seat of Stuart since the 2022 South Australian state election. Prior to this, he represented the seat of Frome from the 2009 Frome by-election until a redistribution leading up to the 2022 state election.

Brock has previously served as the Minister for Local Government, Minister for Regional Roads and Minister for Veterans Affairs in the first Malinauskas Labor ministry from 2022 to 2024. Brock was previously the Minister for Regional Development and Minister for Local Government in the Weatherill Labor cabinet from 2014 until Labor's defeat at the 2018 election.

== Background ==
Brock had worked in Port Pirie's lead smelter, which was eventually acquired by Nyrstar, since arriving in the town in 1976. He was first elected to the Port Pirie Regional Council (at that time a City Council) in 1989, and served on numerous community committees before being elected mayor in May 2003, defeating sitting mayor Ken Madigan by 3,297 votes to 2,173. He retired from Nyrstar in September 2007, and he and his second wife Lyn have 12 grandchildren between them.

== Political career ==
=== 2009 Frome by-election ===
Brock had a shock win at the 2009 Frome state by-election, defeating the Liberal candidate Terry Boylan. He had a high local profile prior to the election, having served for almost six years as council mayor. Independent Senator Nick Xenophon also campaigned for Brock.

On 23.6 percent of the primary vote and 51.7 percent of the two-candidate-preferred vote, Brock's election depended on preferences from Labor, Nationals, and the Greens, the former two having placed him second on their how-to-vote card. His own how-to-vote card saw him preference the Nationals, Labor, Liberal, Greens, and One Nation, in that order. The by-election was closely contested, with the result being uncertain for over a week. Initial reports suggested a slight swing to the Liberal candidate Terry Boylan on the two-party-preferred count against Labor, with Brock close behind Labor. By 21 January 2009, both the ABC's Antony Green and the state electoral office were indicating a 2-point swing against the Liberals toward Labor on 51.4 percent, but not enough to lose the seat. Liberal leader Martin Hamilton-Smith claimed victory on behalf of the party.

However, the result hinged on the performance of Brock against Labor in the competition for second place. Brock won the primary vote in the Port Pirie area and picked up enough National and Green preferences to overtake the Labor candidate for second place by 30 votes. He then picked up enough Labor preferences to take the seat off the Liberals on a two-candidate-preferred vote of 51.7 percent (a majority of 665 votes), despite a slight improvement in the Liberal vote since the previous count.

=== Parliamentary service ===
At the 2010 election, Brock increased his primary vote to 37.7 percent and two-candidate vote to 57.5 percent. Labor won from the Liberals the two-party-preferred vote on 50.1 percent. At the 2014 election, Brock increased his primary vote to 45.2 percent and two-candidate vote to 58.8 percent. The election resulted in a hung parliament with 23 Labor seats, 22 Liberal seats, and two independents. The balance of power was held by crossbench independents Brock and Bob Such. Such did not indicate who he would support in a minority government before he was diagnosed and hospitalised with a brain tumour and took medical leave one week after the election. University of Adelaide Professor and political commentator Clem Macintyre said Such's situation virtually guaranteed Brock would side with Labor. With 24 seats required to govern, Brock backed Labor. Macintyre said:

If Geoff Brock had gone with the Liberals, then the Parliament would have effectively been tied 23 to 23, so once Bob Such became ill and stepped away then Geoff Brock, I think had no choice but to side with Labor.

Brock accepted the cabinet positions of Minister for Regional Development and Minister for Local Government in the Weatherill ministry. In return, Brock agreed to support the Labor government on confidence and supply while retaining the right to otherwise vote on conscience. A few months later, Labor achieved majority government when Nat Cook won the 2014 Fisher by-election which was triggered by the death of Such. Despite this, Weatherill kept Brock and another independent minister Martin Hamilton-Smith in cabinet, giving the government a 26 to 21 parliamentary majority.

Brock held the ministerial portfolios until Labor lost government in the 2018 election. He retained the seat of Frome with a small increase in his primary vote.

A redistribution in 2020 transferred Port Pirie to neighbouring seat of Stuart. In the areas transferred from Frome to Stuart, Brock had polled 65% of the first preference vote and 75% after preferences in the 2018 election, while the rest of Frome was dominantly Liberal. Brock opted to follow most of his base into Stuart at the 2022 election. At the election, Brock defeated incumbent member and Deputy Premier Dan van Holst Pellekaan.

Labor won a majority government at this election. Despite this, Brock was appointed to the first Malinauskas Labor ministry as the Minister for Local Government for the second time, as well as Minister for Regional Roads and Minister for Veterans Affairs. He said he had not expected a ministerial position, and the offer by new Premier Peter Malinauskas two days before the swearing-in ceremony came as "a heck of a shock". He emphasised that "he was not a Labor minister, but would vote with cabinet on decisions made by it", and Malinauskas said that Brock's independence would be "maintained and utterly respected". Brock was one of the two regional cabinet ministers, the other being Clare Scriven.

In April 2024, Brock resigned from Cabinet, citing health reasons. He announced his intention to contest his seat of Stuart at the 2026 election, which he went on to win despite the 7.2 percent swing away from him due to the redistribution.

== See also ==
- Electoral results for the district of Frome
- Electoral results for the district of Stuart

== Notes ==
South Australian House of Assembly
Preceded by Rob Kerin	Member for Frome; 2009–2022	Succeeded by Penny Pratt
Preceded by Dan van Holst Pellekaan	Member for Stuart; 2022–present	Incumbent
Political offices
Preceded by Gail Gago as Minister for State / Local Government Relations	Minister for Local Government; 2014–2018	Succeeded by Stephan Knoll as Minister for Transport, Infrastructure and Local Government
Preceded by Gail Gago	Minister for Regional Development; 2014–2018	Succeeded by Tim Whetstone as Minister for Primary Industries and Regional Development
Preceded by Josh Teague as Minister for Planning and Local Government	Minister for Local Government; 2022–2024	Succeeded by Joe Szakacs
New title	Minister for Veterans Affairs; 2022–2024	Succeeded by Joe Szakacs
New title	Minister for Regional Roads; 2022–2024	Vacant
