= Electoral results for the district of Frome =

South Australian district election results

This is a list of electoral results for the Electoral district of Frome in South Australian state elections.

== Members for Frome ==
First incarnation (1884–1902, two members)
| Member | Party | Term |
|---|---|---|
| Ebenezer Ward | none | 1884–1890 |
| William Copley | none | 1884–1887 |
| Clement Giles | none | 1887–1890 |
| Laurence O'Loughlin | Liberal | 1890–1902 |
| Clement Giles | Conservative | 1890–late 1890s |
| Clement Giles | National Defence League | Late 1890s–1902 |
Second incarnation (1938–1977)
| Member | Party | Term |
| Mick O'Halloran | Labor Party | 1938–1960 |
| Tom Casey | Labor Party | 1960–1970 |
| Ernest Allen | Liberal Party | 1970–1977 |
Third incarnation (1993–2026)
| Member | Party | Term |
| Rob Kerin | Liberal Party | 1993–2008 |
| Geoff Brock | Independent | 2009–2022 |
| Penny Pratt | Liberal | 2022–2026 |

== Election results ==
=== Elections in the 2020s ===
2022 South Australian state election: Frome
| Party | Candidate | Votes | % | ±% |
|---|---|---|---|---|
| Liberal | Penny Pratt | 10,573 | 45.0 | −10.1 |
| Labor | Ashton Charvetto | 6,002 | 25.6 | +5.5 |
| Independent | Cate Hunter | 3,908 | 16.6 | +16.6 |
| One Nation | Caterina Johnston | 2,588 | 11.0 | +11.0 |
| National | Loma Silsbury | 410 | 1.7 | +1.7 |
| Total formal votes | | 23,481 | 96.3 | |
| Informal votes | | 900 | 3.7 | |
| Turnout | | 24,381 | 90.6 | |
Two-party-preferred result
| Liberal | Penny Pratt | 13,645 | 58.1 | −10.0 |
| Labor | Ashton Charvetto | 9,836 | 41.9 | +10.0 |
| Liberal notional hold | | Swing | −10.0 | |

Distribution of preferences: Frome
| Party | Candidate | Votes | Round 1 | | Round 2 | | Round 3 | |
| Party | Candidate | Votes | Dist. | Total | Dist. | Total | Dist. | Total |
|---|---|---|---|---|---|---|---|---|
| Quota (50% + 1) | | 11,741 | | | | | | |
| Liberal | Penny Pratt | 10,573 | +135 | 10,708 | +485 | 11,193 | +2,451 | 13,644 |
| Labor | Ashton Charvetto | 6,002 | +45 | 6,047 | +532 | 6,579 | +3,258 | 9,837 |
| Independent | Cate Hunter | 3,908 | +130 | 4,038 | +1,671 | 5,709 | Excluded | |
| One Nation | Caterina Johnston | 2,588 | +100 | 2,688 | Excluded | | | |
| National | Loma Silsbury | 410 | Excluded | | | | | |

=== Elections in the 2010s ===
==== 2018 ====
2018 South Australian state election: Frome
| Party | Candidate | Votes | % | ±% |
|---|---|---|---|---|
| Independent | Geoff Brock | 9,516 | 46.0 | +2.1 |
| Liberal | Kendall Jackson | 7,929 | 38.3 | +3.0 |
| Labor | Annette Elliot | 2,077 | 10.0 | −2.4 |
| Greens | Paul Birkwood | 622 | 3.0 | +0.2 |
| Dignity | Cat Connor | 556 | 2.7 | +2.7 |
| Total formal votes | | 20,700 | 96.7 | −0.9 |
| Informal votes | | 717 | 3.3 | +0.9 |
| Turnout | | 21,417 | 91.8 | −1.2 |
Two-party-preferred result
| Liberal | Kendall Jackson | 12,648 | 61.1 | +1.3 |
| Labor | Annette Elliot | 8,052 | 38.9 | −1.3 |
Two-candidate-preferred result
| Independent | Geoff Brock | 12,043 | 58.2 | −1.2 |
| Liberal | Kendall Jackson | 8,657 | 41.8 | +1.2 |
| Independent hold | | Swing | −1.2 | |

2014 South Australian state election: Frome
| Party | Candidate | Votes | % | ±% |
|---|---|---|---|---|
| Independent | Geoff Brock | 10,342 | 45.2 | +7.5 |
| Liberal | Kendall Jackson | 8,217 | 35.9 | −0.6 |
| Labor | Marcus Connelly | 2,598 | 11.3 | −7.2 |
| Family First | Wendy Joyce | 1,156 | 5.1 | +2.4 |
| Greens | Rob Scott | 578 | 2.5 | −0.6 |
| Total formal votes | | 22,891 | 97.6 | +0.4 |
| Informal votes | | 566 | 2.4 | −0.4 |
| Turnout | | 23,457 | 93.0 | −1.8 |
Two-party-preferred result
| Liberal | Kendall Jackson | | 60.8 | +10.7 |
| Labor | Marcus Connelly | | 39.2 | −10.7 |
Two-candidate-preferred result
| Independent | Geoff Brock | 13,451 | 58.8 | +0.6 |
| Liberal | Kendall Jackson | 9,440 | 41.2 | −0.6 |
| Independent hold | | Swing | +0.6 | |

2010 South Australian state election: Frome
| Party | Candidate | Votes | % | ±% |
|---|---|---|---|---|
| Independent | Geoff Brock | 7,965 | 37.7 | +14.1 |
| Liberal | Terry Boylan | 7,713 | 36.5 | −2.7 |
| Labor | John Rohde | 3,900 | 18.5 | −7.6 |
| Greens | Joy O'Brien | 644 | 3.1 | −0.7 |
| Family First | John McComb | 561 | 2.7 | +2.7 |
| Save the RAH | Max Van Dissel | 328 | 1.6 | +1.6 |
| Total formal votes | | 21,111 | 97.2 | |
| Informal votes | | 587 | 2.8 | |
| Turnout | | 21,698 | 94.8 | |
Two-party-preferred result
| Labor | John Rohde | 10,585 | 50.1 | +1.8 |
| Liberal | Terry Boylan | 10,526 | 49.9 | −1.8 |
Two-candidate-preferred result
| Independent | Geoff Brock | 12,281 | 58.2 | +6.5 |
| Liberal | Terry Boylan | 8,830 | 41.8 | −6.5 |
| Independent hold | | Swing | +6.5 | |

=== Elections in the 2000s ===
2009 Frome state by-election
| Party | Candidate | Votes | % | ±% |
|---|---|---|---|---|
| Liberal | Terry Boylan | 7,576 | 39.24 | −8.86 |
| Labor | John Rohde | 5,041 | 26.11 | −14.93 |
| Independent | Geoff Brock | 4,557 | 23.60 | +23.60 |
| National | Neville Wilson | 1,267 | 6.56 | +6.56 |
| Greens | Joy O'Brien | 734 | 3.80 | +0.06 |
| One Nation | Peter Fitzpatrick | 134 | 0.69 | +0.69 |
| Total formal votes | | 19,309 | 97.12 | +0.21 |
| Informal votes | | 573 | 2.88 | −0.21 |
| Turnout | | 19,882 | 89.79 | −4.44 |
Two-party-preferred result
| Liberal | Terry Boylan | 9,976 | 51.67 | −1.74 |
| Labor | John Rohde | 9,333 | 48.33 | +1.74 |
Two-candidate-preferred result
| Independent | Geoff Brock | 9,987 | 51.72 | +51.72 |
| Liberal | Terry Boylan | 9,322 | 48.28 | −5.13 |
| Independent gain from Liberal | | Swing | N/A | |

2006 South Australian state election
| Party | Candidate | Votes | % | ±% |
|---|---|---|---|---|
| Liberal | Rob Kerin | 9,655 | 48.10 | −9.48 |
| Labor | John Rohde | 8,237 | 41.04 | +5.88 |
| Family First | John McComb | 1,038 | 5.17 | +5.17 |
| Greens | Rosalie Garland | 750 | 3.74 | +3.74 |
| Democrats | Marcus Reseigh | 393 | 1.96 | −2.22 |
| Total formal votes | | 20,073 | 96.91 | −1.35 |
| Informal votes | | 640 | 3.09 | +1.35 |
| Turnout | | 20,713 | 94.23 | −1.08 |
Two-party-preferred result
| Liberal | Rob Kerin | 10,721 | 53.41 | −8.05 |
| Labor | John Rohde | 9,352 | 46.59 | +8.05 |
| Liberal hold | | Swing | −8.05 | |

2002 South Australian state election: Frome
| Party | Candidate | Votes | % | ±% |
|---|---|---|---|---|
| Liberal | Rob Kerin | 11,892 | 57.6 | +12.2 |
| Labor | John Rohde | 7,261 | 35.2 | −0.3 |
| Democrats | Marcus Reseigh | 863 | 4.2 | −6.6 |
| One Nation | Roger Hawkes | 636 | 3.1 | +3.1 |
| Total formal votes | | 20,652 | 98.3 | |
| Informal votes | | 366 | 1.7 | |
| Turnout | | 21,018 | 95.3 | |
Two-party-preferred result
| Liberal | Rob Kerin | 12,692 | 61.5 | +8.6 |
| Labor | John Rohde | 7,960 | 38.5 | −8.6 |
| Liberal hold | | Swing | +8.6 | |

=== Elections in the 1990s ===
1997 South Australian state election: Frome
| Party | Candidate | Votes | % | ±% |
|---|---|---|---|---|
| Liberal | Rob Kerin | 8,884 | 45.4 | −6.4 |
| Labor | Colin McGavisk | 6,945 | 35.5 | −4.7 |
| Democrats | Marcus Reseigh | 2,111 | 10.8 | +5.4 |
| United Australia | Ian Gray | 1,648 | 8.4 | +8.4 |
| Total formal votes | | 19,588 | 96.8 | −1.1 |
| Informal votes | | 647 | 3.2 | +1.1 |
| Turnout | | 20,235 | 94.0 | |
Two-party-preferred result
| Liberal | Rob Kerin | 10,368 | 52.9 | −2.8 |
| Labor | Colin McGavisk | 9,220 | 47.1 | +2.8 |
| Liberal hold | | Swing | −2.8 | |

1993 South Australian state election: Frome
| Party | Candidate | Votes | % | ±% |
|---|---|---|---|---|
| Liberal | Rob Kerin | 10,615 | 51.8 | +10.2 |
| Labor | Allan Aughey | 8,239 | 40.2 | +3.3 |
| Democrats | David Clarke | 1,112 | 5.4 | −0.5 |
| Natural Law | Vicki Reimer | 519 | 2.5 | +2.5 |
| Total formal votes | | 20,485 | 97.9 | +0.3 |
| Informal votes | | 437 | 2.1 | −0.3 |
| Turnout | | 20,922 | 94.0 | |
Two-party-preferred result
| Liberal | Rob Kerin | 11,420 | 55.7 | +1.3 |
| Labor | Allan Aughey | 9,065 | 44.3 | −1.3 |
| Liberal hold | | Swing | +1.3 | |

=== Elections in the 1970s ===
1975 South Australian state election: Frome
| Party | Candidate | Votes | % | ±% |
|---|---|---|---|---|
| Liberal | Ernest Allen | 4,242 | 55.3 | −5.6 |
| Labor | James Reese | 2,638 | 34.4 | −4.7 |
| Liberal Movement | David Sara | 785 | 10.2 | +10.2 |
| Total formal votes | | 7,665 | 97.2 | +0.1 |
| Informal votes | | 224 | 2.8 | −0.1 |
| Turnout | | 7,889 | 91.6 | −1.9 |
Two-party-preferred result
| Liberal | Ernest Allen | 4,952 | 64.6 | +3.7 |
| Labor | James Reese | 2,713 | 35.4 | −3.7 |
| Liberal hold | | Swing | +3.7 | |

1973 South Australian state election: Frome
| Party | Candidate | Votes | % | ±% |
|---|---|---|---|---|
| Liberal and Country | Ernest Allen | 4,584 | 60.9 | +10.1 |
| Labor | Gerard Casanova | 2,939 | 39.1 | −6.1 |
| Total formal votes | | 7,523 | 97.1 | −1.1 |
| Informal votes | | 224 | 2.9 | +1.1 |
| Turnout | | 7,747 | 93.5 | −0.2 |
| Liberal and Country hold | | Swing | +6.7 | |

1970 South Australian state election: Frome
| Party | Candidate | Votes | % | ±% |
|---|---|---|---|---|
| Liberal and Country | Ernest Allen | 3,881 | 50.8 | |
| Labor | Gerard Casanova | 3,451 | 45.2 | |
| Democratic Labor | John McMahon | 302 | 4.0 | |
| Total formal votes | | 7,634 | 98.2 | |
| Informal votes | | 136 | 1.8 | |
| Turnout | | 7,770 | 93.7 | |
Two-party-preferred result
| Liberal and Country | Ernest Allen | 4,138 | 54.2 | |
| Labor | Gerard Casanova | 3,496 | 45.8 | |
| Liberal and Country hold | | Swing | | |

=== Elections in the 1960s ===
1968 South Australian state election: Frome
| Party | Candidate | Votes | % | ±% |
|---|---|---|---|---|
| Labor | Tom Casey | 2,672 | 58.8 | +0.9 |
| Liberal and Country | Maxwell Hams | 1,874 | 41.2 | +2.2 |
| Total formal votes | | 4,546 | 98.1 | −0.4 |
| Informal votes | | 88 | 1.9 | +0.4 |
| Turnout | | 4,634 | 92.9 | +0.5 |
| Labor hold | | Swing | +0.5 | |

1965 South Australian state election: Frome
| Party | Candidate | Votes | % | ±% |
|---|---|---|---|---|
| Labor | Tom Casey | 2,666 | 57.9 | +2.3 |
| Liberal and Country | Maxwell Hams | 1,799 | 39.0 | −1.3 |
| Democratic Labor | John McMahon | 142 | 3.1 | −1.0 |
| Total formal votes | | 4,607 | 98.5 | +0.5 |
| Informal votes | | 68 | 1.5 | −0.5 |
| Turnout | | 4,675 | 92.4 | +0.9 |
Two-party-preferred result
| Labor | Tom Casey | 2,687 | 58.3 | +2.1 |
| Liberal and Country | Maxwell Hams | 1,920 | 41.7 | −2.1 |
| Labor hold | | Swing | +2.1 | |

1962 South Australian state election: Frome
| Party | Candidate | Votes | % | ±% |
|---|---|---|---|---|
| Labor | Tom Casey | 2,932 | 55.6 | +4.0 |
| Liberal and Country | Maxwell Hams | 2,124 | 40.3 | −1.9 |
| Democratic Labor | John McMahon | 217 | 4.1 | −2.1 |
| Total formal votes | | 5,273 | 99.0 | +0.4 |
| Informal votes | | 53 | 1.0 | −0.4 |
| Turnout | | 5,326 | 91.5 | +0.6 |
Two-party-preferred result
| Labor | Tom Casey | 2,965 | 56.2 | +3.7 |
| Liberal and Country | Maxwell Hams | 2,308 | 43.8 | −3.7 |
| Labor hold | | Swing | +3.7 | |

=== Elections in the 1950s ===
1959 South Australian state election: Frome
| Party | Candidate | Votes | % | ±% |
|---|---|---|---|---|
| Labor | Mick O'Halloran | 2,711 | 51.6 | −1.0 |
| Liberal and Country | Maxwell Hams | 2,219 | 42.2 | +6.0 |
| Democratic Labor | Michael Hoare | 326 | 6.2 | −5.0 |
| Total formal votes | | 5,256 | 98.6 | 0.0 |
| Informal votes | | 76 | 1.4 | 0.0 |
| Turnout | | 5,332 | 90.9 | +1.9 |
Two-party-preferred result
| Labor | Mick O'Halloran | | 52.5 | −1.8 |
| Liberal and Country | Maxwell Hams | | 47.5 | +1.8 |
| Labor hold | | Swing | −1.8 | |

- Two party preferred vote was estimated.

1956 South Australian state election: Frome
| Party | Candidate | Votes | % | ±% |
|---|---|---|---|---|
| Labor | Mick O'Halloran | 2,844 | 52.6 | |
| Liberal and Country | Raymond McAuley | 1,954 | 36.2 | |
| Labor (A-C) | Michael Hoare | 606 | 11.2 | |
| Total formal votes | | 5,404 | 98.6 | |
| Informal votes | | 76 | 1.4 | |
| Turnout | | 5,480 | 89.0 | |
Two-party-preferred result
| Labor | Mick O'Halloran | | 54.3 | |
| Liberal and Country | Raymond McAuley | | 45.7 | |
| Labor hold | | Swing | | |

- Two party preferred vote was estimated.

1953 South Australian state election: Frome
| Party | Candidate | Votes | % | ±% |
|---|---|---|---|---|
| Labor | Mick O'Halloran | unopposed | | |
| Labor hold | | Swing | | |

1950 South Australian state election: Frome
| Party | Candidate | Votes | % | ±% |
|---|---|---|---|---|
| Labor | Mick O'Halloran | unopposed | | |
| Labor hold | | Swing | | |
