= Tom Koutsantonis =

Australian politician

The Honourable Tom Koutsantonis MP
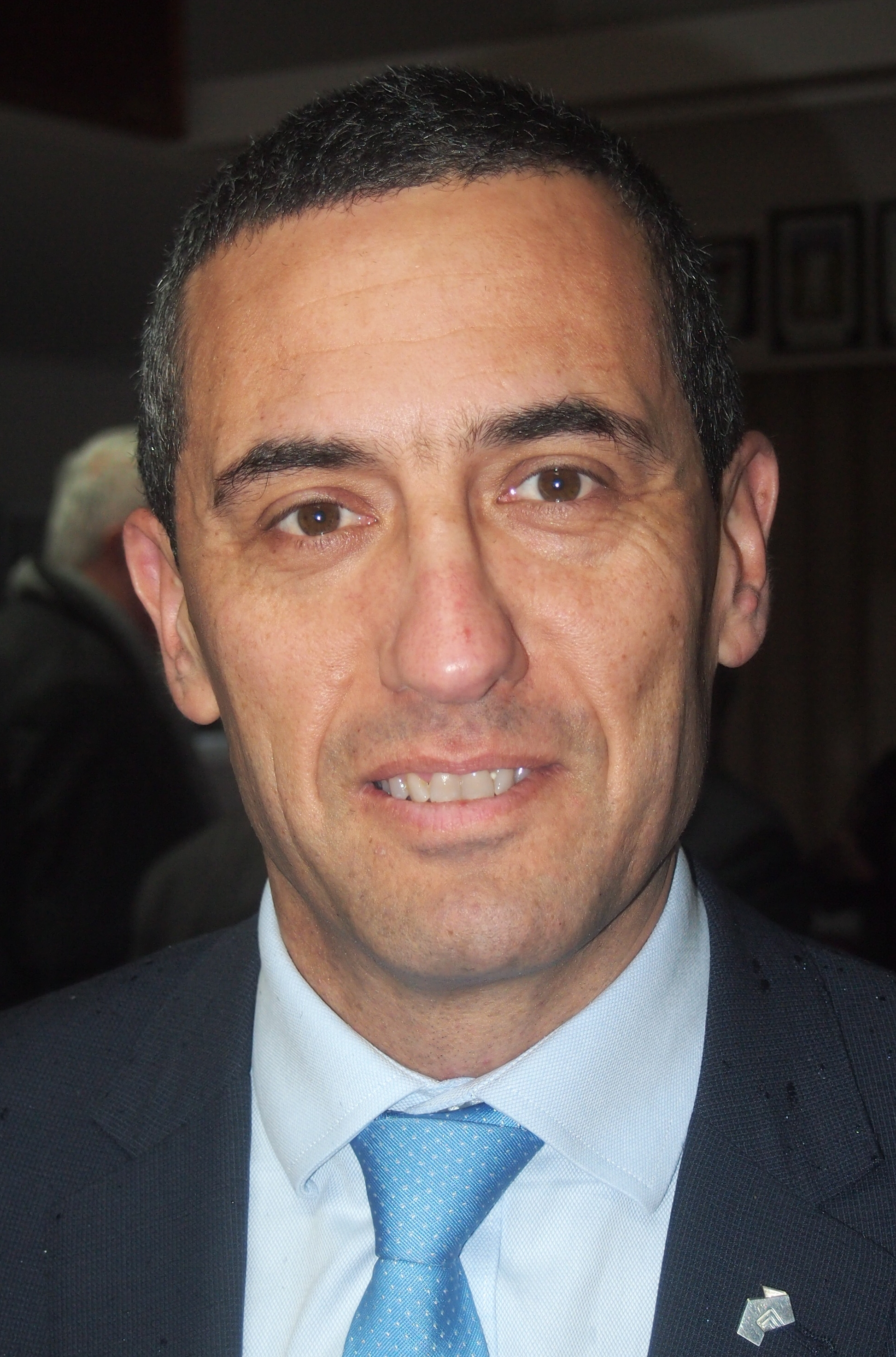
- Koutsantonis in 2016

Treasurer of South Australia
- Incumbent
- Assumed office 19 September 2025
- Premier: Peter Malinauskas
- Preceded by: Stephen Mullighan
- In office 26 March 2014 – 19 March 2018
- Premier: Jay Weatherill
- Preceded by: Jay Weatherill
- Succeeded by: Rob Lucas

Minister for Public Sector
- Incumbent
- Assumed office 25 March 2026
- Premier: Peter Malinauskas
- Preceded by: Kyam Maher (as Minister for Industrial Relations and Public Sector)

Leader of Government Business in the House of Assembly
- Incumbent
- Assumed office 24 March 2022
- Premier: Peter Malinauskas
- Preceded by: Dan van Holst Pellekaan

Minister for Energy and Mining
- Incumbent
- Assumed office 24 March 2022
- Premier: Peter Malinauskas
- Preceded by: Dan van Holst Pellekaan

Minister for Infrastructure and Transport
- In office 24 March 2022 – 19 September 2025
- Premier: Peter Malinauskas
- Preceded by: Corey Wingard
- Succeeded by: Emily Bourke

Father of the Parliament of South Australia
- Incumbent
- Assumed office 19 March 2022
- Preceded by: Rob Lucas
- Succeeded by
Previous offices 2009–2022
Minister for Finance
In office 26 March 2014 – 19 March 2018
Premier	Jay Weatherill
Preceded by	Jay Weatherill
Succeeded by	Rob Lucas
Minister for State Development
In office 26 March 2014 – 19 March 2018
Premier	Jay Weatherill
Preceded by	Jay Weatherill
Succeeded by	David Pisoni (as Minister for Industry and Skills)
Minister for Automotive Transformation
In office 26 March 2014 – 27 May 2014
Premier	Jay Weatherill
Preceded by	New office
Succeeded by	Susan Close
Minister for Small Business
In office 26 March 2014 – 19 January 2016
Premier	Jay Weatherill
Preceded by	Tom Kenyon
Succeeded by	Martin Hamilton-Smith
In office 25 March 2010 – 21 January 2013
Premier	Mike Rann; Jay Weatherill
Preceded by	Russell Wortley
Succeeded by	Tom Kenyon
Minister for Housing and Urban Development
In office 21 January 2013 – 26 March 2014
Premier	Jay Weatherill
Preceded by	Pat Conlon
Succeeded by	John Rau
Minister for Transport and Infrastructure
In office 21 January 2013 – 26 March 2014
Premier	Jay Weatherill
Preceded by	Pat Conlon
Succeeded by	Stephen Mullighan
Minister for Mineral Resources and Energy
In office 21 October 2011 – 19 March 2018
Premier	Jay Weatherill
Preceded by	Himself (as Minister for Mineral Resources Development)
Succeeded by	Dan van Holst Pellekaan (as Minister for Energy and Mining)
Minister for Mineral Resources Development
In office 8 February 2011 – 21 October 2011
Premier	Mike Rann
Preceded by	Paul Holloway
Succeeded by	Himself (as Minister for Mineral Resources and Energy)

Member of the South Australian House of Assembly for West Torrens Peake (1997–2002)
- Incumbent
- Assumed office 11 October 1997
- Preceded by: Heini Becker

Personal details
- Born: Anastasios Koutsantonis; 23 August 1971 (age 55) Woodville, South Australia
- Party: Labor
- Spouse: Anthea (m. 2009)
- Education: Adelaide High School
- Alma mater: University of Adelaide
- Website: www.tomkoutsantonismp.com.au

Anastasios "Tom" Koutsantonis (born 23 August 1971) is an Australian politician in the South Australian Labor Party, representing the seats of West Torrens (2002−current) and Peake (1997−2002) in the South Australian House of Assembly. He has served as Minister for Energy and Mining and as Leader of Government Business in the House of Assembly since 2022 and as the Treasurer of South Australia since 2025 in the first and second Malinauskas ministries.

Koutsantonis served as Treasurer and minister for other portfolios in the Weatherill cabinet between 2011 and 2018. From March 2022, Koutsantonis served as the Minister for Infrastructure and Transport and the Minister for Energy and Mining in the Malinauskas ministry. On 19 September 2025, in a Cabinet reshuffle owing to the resignation of two front benchers, he was once again appointed Treasurer. He retains the portfolio of energy and mining, but lost the infrastructure and transport portfolio.

== Early life and education ==
Anastasios Koutsantonis was born on 23 August 1971 in Adelaide to Greek-Australian parents.

He attended Cowandilla and Netley Primary School and Adelaide High School, before going on to study at the University of Adelaide.

Koutsantonis was encouraged and inspired to get involved in politics by former deputy premier Jack Wright, and first volunteered in Wright's office when he was 14.

== Early career ==
Koutsantonis became an industrial officer for the Shop, Distributive and Allied Employees Association in the 1990s.

== Parliament ==
Koutsantonis was elected to the seat of Peake (now West Torrens) at the 1997 election on a margin of 4.5 points, aged 26. He was elected by 8.6 points at the 2002 election, and by 18.3 points at the 2006 election, after which Koutsantonis was elevated to the chairmanship of the economic and advisory committee.

On 3 March 2009, he was appointed to cabinet, and remained in Cabinet until the 2018 state election. Koutsantonis has served in a range of ministerial portfolios, with responsibility for finance, state development, mineral resources and energy, small business, ministerial resources and energy, and for road safety. Koutsantonis was forced to apologise for his "unacceptable" driving record which listed 58 traffic offences and over $10,000 in fines. He subsequently resigned the road safety portfolio.

Following the retirement of Liberal's Rob Lucas at the 2022 state election, Koutsantonis became the longest-serving member of the South Australian Parliament. His long-serving parliamentary service was recognised by Labor leader Peter Malinauskas in his victory speech on election night. After the election, Malinauskas appointed Koutsantonis as Minister for Infrastructure and Transport and Minister for Energy and Mining.

On 19 September 2025, in a Cabinet reshuffle following announcements by Susan Close and Stephen Mullighan of their resignations at the next state election, Koutsantonis was once again appointed Treasurer. He retains the portfolio of energy and mining, but the infrastructure and transport portfolio was passed to Emily Bourke.

== Politics ==
Koutsantonis is considered conservative within Labor politics, and convenes the Labor-right faction of the party.

In February 2010, Koutsantonis sent a letter to his constituents about "vile behaviour" seen at Apex Park on Burbridge Road, West Beach, which was being used as a gay beat. He said that constituents should report lewd acts to police. South Australia Police were aware of attacks apparently targeting gay men at the park. Koutsantonis was accused of inciting hatred against homosexuals in by Sydney gay-rights activist Gary Burns, who lodged a complaint to the South Australian Equal Opportunity Commission. The complaint was rejected because Koutsantonis had not breached the Equal Opportunity Act. He rejected claims that he was homophobic, saying that he had supported gay rights in parliament. He said: "This is not about sexuality. It is about stamping out an illegal activity and preventing children from being exposed to lewd acts and health risks." During a debate on same-sex marriage in South Australian parliament in 2012, Koutsantonis outlined his "very dear" belief that marriage is between a man and a woman, but that he supported civil unions and legal rights of gay couples.

In 2021 he was one of three Labor MPs to vote against a Euthanasia Bill because of his conviction to sanctity of life, despite acknowledging that as much as 85% of his constituents supported it. He was one of four lower house parliamentarians to vote against the decriminalisation of abortion in 2021, alongside Labor MP Stephen Mullighan and Liberal MPs Stephen Knoll and David Speirs.

== Personal life ==
Koutsantonis married Anthea in February 2009, and they have two daughters.

South Australian House of Assembly
Preceded by Heini Becker	Member for Peake; 1997–2002	Seat abolished
New seat	Member for West Torrens; 2002–present	Incumbent
Political offices
Preceded by Carmel Zollo	Minister for Road Safety; 2009	Succeeded by Michael O'Brien
Preceded by Paul Caica	Minister for Youth; 2009–2010	Succeeded by Ian Hunter
Preceded by Jennifer Rankine	Minister for Volunteers; 2009–2010	Succeeded by Ian Hunter
Preceded by Carmel Zollo	Minister for Gambling; 2009–2011	Office abolished
Preceded by Carmel Zollo	Minister of Correctional Services; 2009–2011	Succeeded by Jennifer Rankine
Preceded by Russell Wortley	Minister for Small Business; 2010–2013	Succeeded by Tom Kenyon
Preceded by Rory McEwen	Minister for Industry and Trade; 2010–2011	Succeeded by Himself as Minister for Manufacturing, Innovation and Trade
Preceded by Himself as Minister for Manufacturing, Innovation and Trade	Minister for Manufacturing, Innovation and Trade; 2011–2013	Succeeded by Tom Kenyon
Preceded by Paul Holloway	Minister for Mineral Resources Development; 2011	Succeeded by Himself as Minister for Mineral Resources and Energy
Preceded by Himself as Minister for Mineral Resources Development	Minister for Mineral Resources and Energy; 2011–2018	Succeeded by Dan van Holst Pellekaan as Minister for Energy and Mining
Preceded by Patrick Conlon	Minister for Transport and Infrastructure; 2013–2014	Succeeded by Stephen Mullighan
Preceded by Patrick Conlon	Minister for Housing and Urban Development; 2013–2014	Succeeded by John Rau
New title	Minister for Automotive Transformation; 2014	Succeeded by Susan Close
Preceded by Tom Kenyon	Minister for Small Business; 2014–2016	Succeeded by Martin Hamilton-Smith
Preceded by Jay Weatherill	Treasurer of South Australia; 2014–2018	Succeeded by Rob Lucas
Preceded by Jay Weatherill	Minister for Finance; 2014–2018	Succeeded by Rob Lucas
Preceded by Jay Weatherill	Minister for State Development; 2014–2018	Succeeded by David Pisoni as Minister for Industry and Skills
Preceded by Corey Wingard	Minister for Infrastructure and Transport; 2022–2025	Succeeded by Emily Bourke
Preceded by Dan van Holst Pellekaan	Minister for Energy and Mining; 2022–present	Incumbent
Preceded by Dan van Holst Pellekaan	Leader of Government Business in the House of Assembly; 2022–present	Incumbent
Preceded by Stephen Mullighan	Treasurer of South Australia; 2025–present	Incumbent
Preceded by Kyam Maher as Minister for Industrial Relations and Public Sector	Minister for Public Sector; 2026–present	Incumbent
