= Miranda, South Australia =

Miranda South Australia
- Coordinates: 32.7°S 137.9°E
- Population: 41 (SAL 2021)
- Postcode(s): 5700
- State electorate(s): Stuart
- Federal division(s): Grey
Localities around Miranda:
Spencer Gulf	Winninowie	Winninowie
Spencer Gulf	Miranda	Nectar Brook
Spencer Gulf	Mambray Creek	Mambray Creek

Miranda is a coastal locality in the Far North region of South Australia, situated within the southeastern corner of the City of Port Augusta. It comprises the section of the cadastral Hundred of Winninowie between the Adelaide-Port Augusta railway line and the coast. The Augusta Highway runs along the Miranda side of the railway line.

Much of the land in Miranda, including the entire coastal section, is contained within the Winninowie Conservation Park, while the Yatala Harbour Upper Spencer Gulf Aquatic Reserve covers a section of coast in the centre of Miranda. Red Cliff Point, located in the conservation park, is listed on the South Australian Heritage Register as a designated place of geological significance.

A government town at Miranda was surveyed in December 1880, and was later extended to include the adjacent Herdes Beach Shack Site. The current larger bounded locality was established in 1994 in respect of the long established name; it incorporated the prior town, a large area of rural and forested land, and the Chinaman Creek Shack Site further north along the coast. The former Nectar Brook railway station was located on its border with Miranda; however, this closed completely by 1986. In the 2011 census, the population of Miranda, including some rural areas outside its formal boundaries, was 47.
