= Malinauskas government =

Malinauskas government may refer to:

- The history of the South Australian Government under Labor Premier Peter Malinauskas
- Malinauskas ministry, the members of the ministry under Premier Peter Malinauskas
