= Winninowie Conservation Park =

Protected area in South Australia

- IUCN category Ia (strict nature reserve)
- Location within South Australia
- Location: South Australia
- Nearest city: Port Augusta
- Coordinates: 32°44′2″S 137°54′32″E
- Area: 78.55 km^{2} (30.33 sq mi)
- Established: 15 March 1990
- Governing body: Department for Environment and Water

Winninowie Conservation Park is a protected area in the Australian state of South Australia located on the east coast of Upper Spencer Gulf about 20 kilometres (12 miles) south by east of Port Augusta and 25 kilometres (16 miles) northwest of Port Germein, in the locality of Miranda. The conservation park was proclaimed in 1990 for the purpose of conserving ‘excellent examples of several coastal and marine ecosystems with sub-tropical affiliations in a temperate environment’ including ‘significant stands of the grey mangrove, Avicennia marina var. resinifera, seagrass and samphire salt marsh communities’. The conservation park's boundaries overlap with those of the Yatala Harbour Upper Spencer Gulf Aquatic Reserve. The conservation park is classified as an IUCN Category Ia protected area.
