= Jay Weatherill =

Australian politician

His Excellency The Honourable Jay Weatherill AO
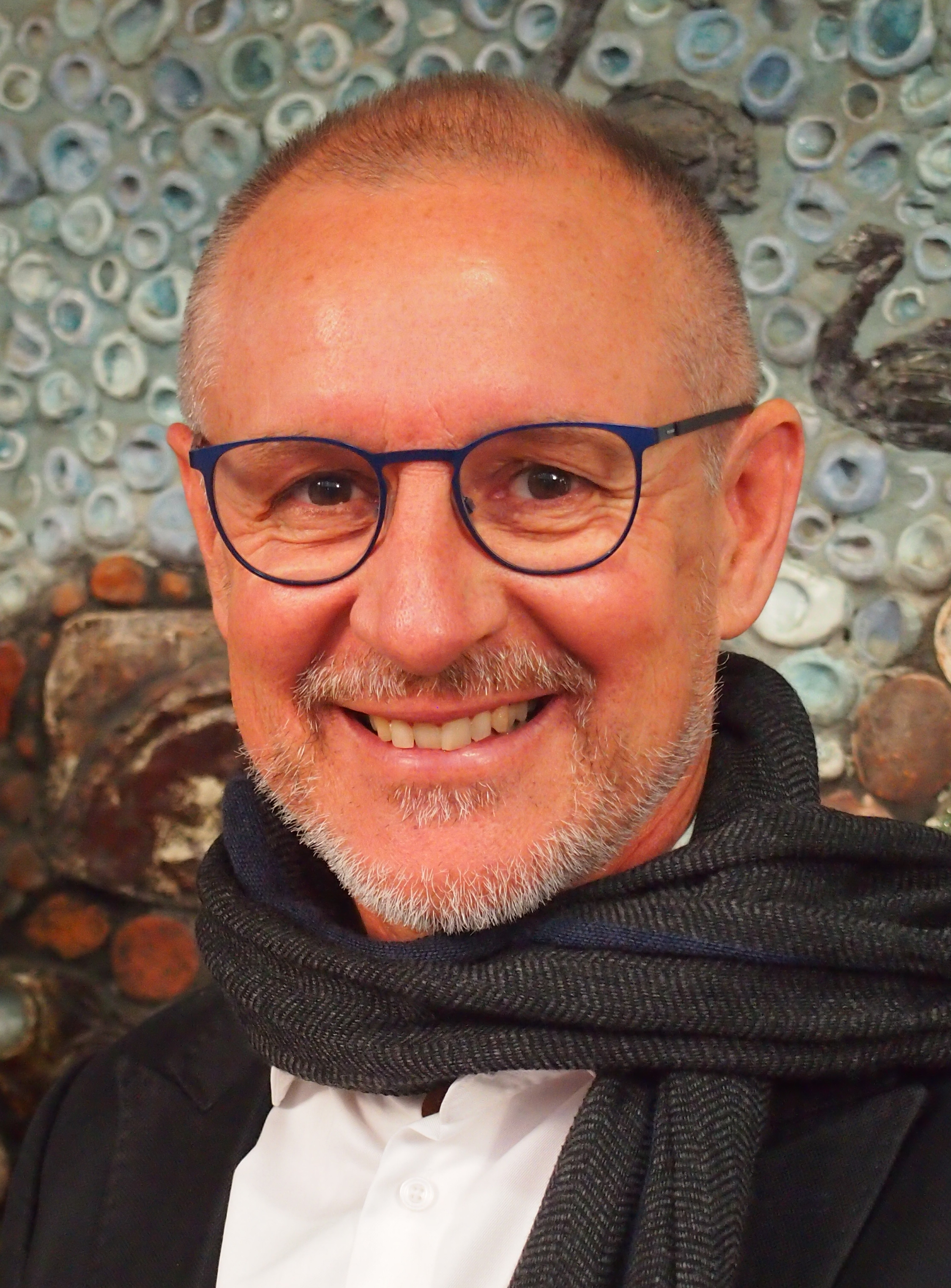
- Weatherill in 2018

High Commissioner of Australia to the United Kingdom
- Incumbent
- Assumed office 27 January 2026
- Prime Minister: Anthony Albanese
- Preceded by: Stephen Smith

45th Premier of South Australia
- In office 21 October 2011 – 19 March 2018
- Monarch: Elizabeth II
- Governor: Kevin Scarce; Hieu Van Le
- Deputy: John Rau
- Preceded by: Mike Rann
- Succeeded by: Steven Marshall
Other offices held
Leader of the South Australian Labor Party
In office 21 October 2011 – 9 April 2018
Deputy	John Rau
Preceded by	Mike Rann
Succeeded by	Peter Malinauskas
Treasurer of South Australia
In office 21 January 2013 – 26 March 2014
Preceded by	Jack Snelling
Succeeded by	Tom Koutsantonis
Minister for Education
In office 25 March 2010 – 21 October 2011
Premier	Mike Rann
Preceded by	Jane Lomax-Smith
Succeeded by	Grace Portolesi
Minister for Environment and Conservation
In office 24 July 2008 – 25 March 2010
Premier	Mike Rann
Preceded by	Gail Gago
Succeeded by	Paul Caica
Minister for Ageing, Disability and Housing
In office 5 March 2004 – 24 July 2008
Premier	Mike Rann
Preceded by	office established
Succeeded by	office abolished
Minister for Administrative Services
In office 6 March 2002 – 5 March 2004
Premier	Mike Rann
Preceded by	Diana Laidlaw
Succeeded by	Trish White
Member of the South Australian House of Assembly for Cheltenham
In office 9 February 2002 – 17 December 2018
Preceded by	Murray De Laine
Succeeded by	Joe Szakacs

Personal details
- Born: Jay Wilson Weatherill; 3 April 1964 (age 62) Adelaide, South Australia, Australia
- Party: Australian Labor Party (SA)
- Spouse: Melissa Bailey
- Children: 2
- Parent: George Weatherill (father)
- Education: University of Adelaide
- Profession: Lawyer

Jay Wilson Weatherill AO (born 3 April 1964) is an Australian diplomat and former politician who was the 45th premier of South Australia, serving from 21 October 2011 until 19 March 2018. Weatherill represented the House of Assembly seat of Cheltenham as a member of the South Australian Labor Party from the 2002 election to 17 December 2018, when he retired from politics. He currently serves as the High Commissioner of Australia to the United Kingdom.

Labor was in government from 2002, with Weatherill leading the Labor government since a 2011 leadership change from Mike Rann. During 2013 it became the longest-serving state Labor government in South Australian history, and in addition went on to win a fourth four-year term at the 2014 election. The 16-year state Labor government lost power at the 2018 election. On 18 March, the day after the election, Weatherill announced his decision to step down as Labor leader, but intended to remain in Parliament on the back-bench. Peter Malinauskas succeeded Weatherill as Labor leader on 9 April. Weatherill announced his intention to retire from Parliament on 6 December 2018.

== Early life ==
Born in the western suburbs of Adelaide, he is the son of English-born former South Australian politician George Weatherill.

Weatherill completed his secondary education at Henley High School. He later studied at the University of Adelaide, graduating with degrees in law and economics.

Between 1987 and 1990, he worked for the Australian Workers' Union. In the early 1990s, he worked at the law firm Duncan Hannon with Patrick Conlon and Isobel Redmond. With fellow Adelaide lawyer Stephen Lieschke, he established industrial law firm Lieschke & Weatherill in 1995 where he practised law until his election to the House of Assembly seat of Cheltenham at the 2002 election when his party won government.

Weatherill unsuccessfully contested the 1997 Australian Constitutional Convention election, running as an ungrouped candidate under the "Bill of Rights for Australia" label.

== Political career ==
Weatherill defeated the incumbent Labor member Murray De Laine for Labor preselection in the electorate of Cheltenham at the 2002 election and went on to retain the seat for Labor. Weatherill is from the Labor Left faction. Upon election he immediately entered the cabinet of the Rann government as Minister for Local Government, Government Enterprise, Urban Development and Planning, and Administrative Services. Later, Weatherill would hold portfolios such as Housing (2004–2008), Aboriginal Affairs and Reconciliation (2006–2010), Early Childhood and Development (2008–2011), Environment and Conservation (2008–2010) and Education (2010–2011).

Following the 2010 election, Weatherill as a cabinet minister in the Rann government, unsuccessfully challenged Kevin Foley for the position of Deputy Premier. Weatherill said the election day backlash against Labor made it evident that a fresh approach was needed; however he lost along factional lines.

== Premier ==
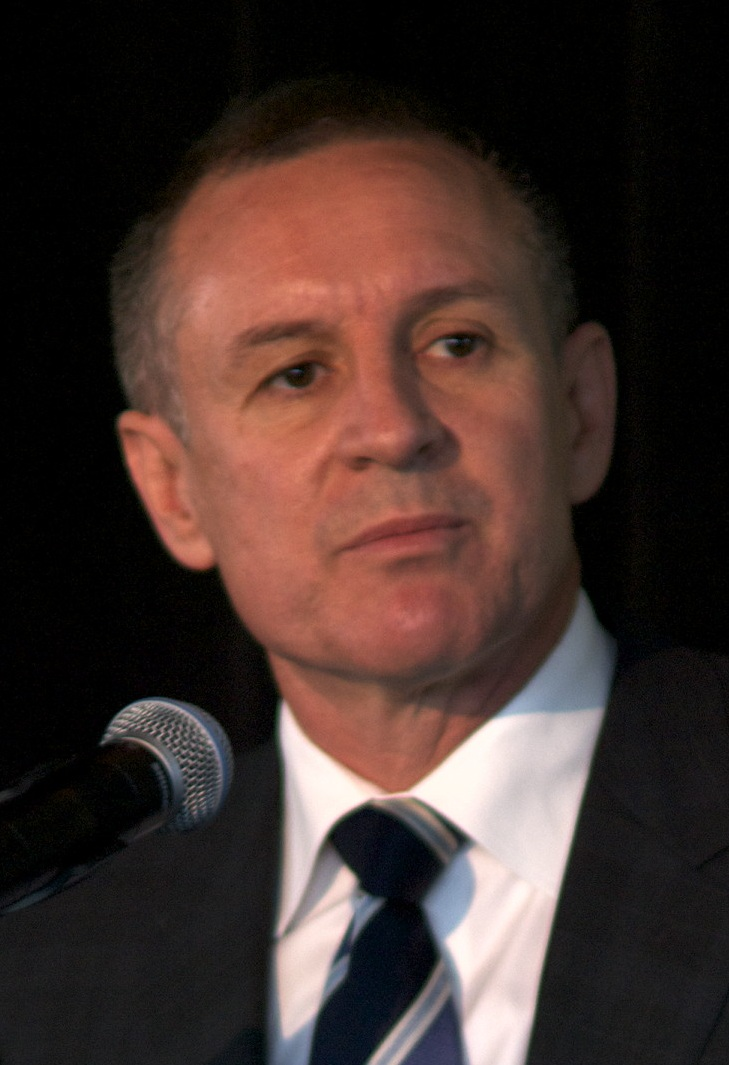
Weatherill in 2012

In late July 2011, a majority of Labor MPs aligned with both the left and right factions agreed to support Weatherill as the next leader, and Rann was informed of the right faction's decision. In early August 2011 Weatherill's attempts at contacting Rann on his trade mission to India had been met with silence, leaving the party leadership in limbo until Rann's return to Australia. Weatherill said he was not prepared to challenge Rann for the leadership and supported an agreed transition. Rann agreed to step down as Labor leader, and Caucus subsequently endorsed Weatherill as his successor. Weatherill was then sworn in as the 45th Premier of South Australia on 21 October 2011.

=== First term ===
In 2011/2012, Weatherill and then Environment Minister Paul Caica brought together irrigators, business, River Murray communities and South Australians more generally to fight for a better deal for the River and South Australia. The result was an additional commitment of 450 gigalitres of environmental water under the Murray Darling Basin Plan.

The 2012–2013 budget was Weatherill's first, with Jack Snelling as treasurer, and came with deep cuts aiming to achieve major savings. Some of this was through suspension of major works programs such as the electrification of the Gawler and Outer Harbor railway lines, and redevelopments of Modbury Hospital and Queen Elizabeth Hospital. Notably, the AAA credit rating achieved under the Rann government was lost, downgraded to AA+ in October, a move foreshadowed by Snelling. Other actions during Weatherill's first 12 months included a deal to increase shopping hours on public holidays, supported by SDA secretary Peter Malinauskas and Business SA chief executive Peter Vaughan, and Weatherill's support for a Greens-initiated gay marriage bill following the announcement of Tasmania's planned changes.

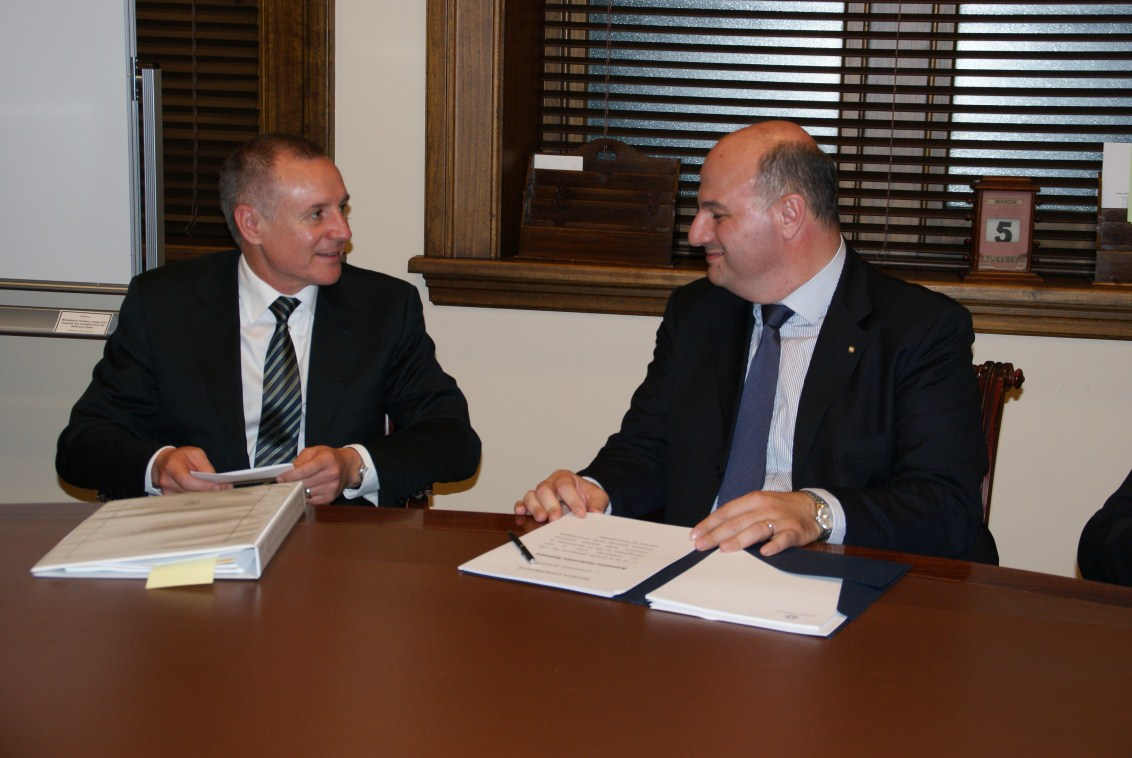
Weatherill meets Deputy Foreign Minister of Greece Konstantinos Tsiaras in a 2013 Australian visit.

The South Australian Health and Medical Research Institute (SAHMRI) was opened by Jay Weatherill in 2013, a building often referred to as "the cheese grater" due to its exterior design. It is a health and medical research institute housing more than 700 researchers, and was the first stage of a new health and bio-medical precinct on North Terrace in Adelaide.

Weatherill allowed a conscience vote for the Greens' 2013 South Australian Gay Marriage bill in August 2012. However, the bill was frustrated by Labor's conservative Catholic right, as well as a lack of support by then Prime Minister Julia Gillard, and faced constitutional issues as expressed by the SA Liberal Party. The bill ultimately failed the lower house in July 2013 following Weatherill's planned conscience vote.

August 2012, in the aftermath of the GFC, BHP announced that the $20 billion Olympic Dam mine expansion would not go ahead, citing 'subdued commodity prices and higher capital costs'. However, the mine remains operational, employing 2500 people.

On 21 January 2013, Weatherill became Treasurer of South Australia and took other various portfolios following a cabinet reshuffle triggered by the resignation of two members of his ministry. The 2013–2014 budget saw revenue increase, in part due to the privatisation of SA Lotto to Tatts Group for $427 million, and of forests in the State's south-east to international company The Campbell Group for $670 million. However, Australia's surging dollar hit the manufacturing industry sector in SA, and growth in indicators such as retail sales and house prices fell. Despite this, the government included funding for the Gawler railway line up to Dry Creek, a number of measures supporting small businesses and entrepreneurs, and promised a return to surplus by 2015–2016.

During the 2013 federal election, both Liberal and Labor promised that the next round of the country's submarines (12) would be built in South Australia, however after the election it appeared that the Liberal government had arranged to buy just eight submarines directly from Japan. Following an organised campaign by Jay Weatherill and Labor, the Advertiser newspaper, workers at the Australian Submarine Corporation and the South Australian public, a “competitive evaluation process” was announced by the Federal Government, with the final contract for a South Australian build awarded to French company DCNS with majority of the work to take place in Osborne, South Australia. Following the announcement, Jay Weatherill travelled to France to meet with DCNS and others in an attempt to maximise opportunities for South Australia. Weatherill also released the French Engagement Strategy, a plan to strengthen economic and business ties with France, also focusing on broader opportunities in areas such as education, tourism and the arts.

In December 2013 Holden announced it would withdraw production from Australia. At the time Holden directly employed 1,600 people in its Elizabeth plant in South Australia, with a total of 3,000 job losses predicted through the supply chain. While Liberal Shadow Treasurer Rob Lucas claimed South Australia was “careering toward double digit unemployment” after the closure, strong support from the Weatherill Labor government ensured the small business sector grew above trend after the closure with unemployment at 6% in January 2017, three months after.

=== 2014 election ===
The 2014 State election resulted in a hung parliament with 23 seats for Labor, 22 for the Liberals, and the balance of power resting with the two independents, Bob Such and Geoff Brock. After Such went on medical leave for a brain tumour without indicating his support, political commentators indicated that Brock would likely back Labor by reason of 'political stability'. Brock did back Labor, giving Labor 24 seats and as a result Weatherill formed a minority government − giving Labor a total four terms in government.

=== Second term ===
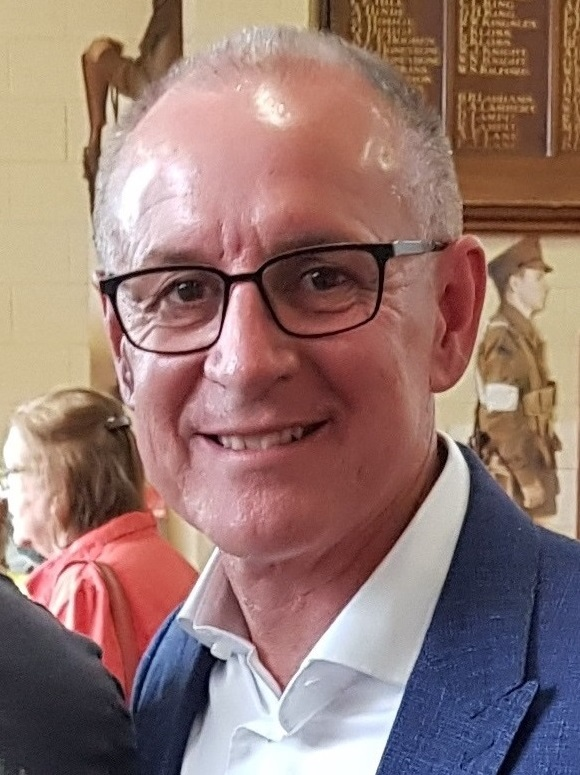
Weatherill in 2018

Weatherill joined with Liberal premiers proclaiming he would lead a national campaign against the then federal Abbott government's 2014 federal budget. Former Liberal Leader Martin Hamilton-Smith then defected, becoming an independent and entered the Weatherill cabinet. Hieu Van Le was announced on 26 June 2014 as the next Governor of South Australia to replace Kevin Scarce. Following the death of Such, Labor won the 2014 Fisher by-election by nine votes from a 7.3 percent two-party swing in a hotly contested three-cornered contest. Weatherill nonetheless kept Brock and Hamilton-Smith in cabinet, giving the government a 26 to 21 parliamentary majority.

In 2015, Weatherill initiated the Nuclear Fuel Cycle Royal Commission to investigate opportunities and risks associated with expanding the state's involvement in the nuclear fuel cycle. The commission was headed by former Governor Kevin Scarce and delivered its final report and recommendation to the Government of South Australia in May 2016. The Royal Commission report urged South Australia to pursue a waste storage facility, claiming South Australia has the "attributes and capabilities to manage and dispose of international used nuclear fuel safely". The report indicated that it was not commercially viable to generate nuclear power. Weatherill used the release of the report as an opportunity to undertake "one of the largest" deliberative democracy processes in Australia's history. Weatherill stated early that a nuclear waste facility would need both public and bipartisan support, with the former withdrawn by Liberal leader Steven Marshall.

In 2015 Jay Weatherill announced that the state government would hold an annual 'Simplify Day' to initiate the reduction and removal of unnecessary regulation and legislation. Over the first two Simplify Days (2016 and 2017), the government amended 101 acts and regulations and removed 22 acts altogether.

Jay Weatherill also set up Investment Attraction South Australia in 2015, attracting international companies including Technicolour, Boeing, Kaufland, Datacom and VeroGuard. In two years the agency had created over 9,000 jobs for South Australians.

In 2015, the Weatherill Government pledged significant funds towards a second building, to be known as the John Chalmers Centre for Transforming Healthcare or 'SAHMRI II', which would house Australia's first proton therapy unit.

In the 2015–16 Budget, Weatherill spruiked his government's plan to abolish stamp duties on business transactions and introduce the nation's lowest payroll tax rate.

In 2015, Weatherill invited the South Australian Law Reform Institute to review all legislation for discrimination against the LGBTIQ community resulting in a number of bills eventually being passed in the South Australian Parliament. These included laws to ensure equal access to IVF and surrogacy services for same sex couples, equal access to adoption, the establishment of a relationships register, the removal of discriminatory language throughout legislation, formal protections for intersex people, and changes to make amending a gender on a birth certificate easier.

During this time, Weatherill also issued a formal apology to the LGBTIQ community for historical discrimination, and signed South Australia up to the trial of the HIV prevention drug PrEP.

In April 2016, Whyalla's steelworks owned by Arrium was placed in voluntary administration by its directors due to significant debts. There were concerns that if the steelworks fell over Whyalla would be unlikely to survive, with one in six of Whyalla's workers employed by Arrium at the time. Weatherill committed $50 million to support the steelworks and called on the Federal Government to commit $100 million, to then be matched by a buyer looking to reform the steelworks. The Federal Government refused, however in 2017 British consortium GFG Alliance settled on terms of a purchase of the steelworks with administrators Korda Menthe. Since the purchase, GFG Alliance has invested in Whyalla in a number of ways including a $1.37 billion renewable energy project.

In 2016, Weatherill supported calls for increasing the GST to 15%. He argued that the GST rate should be increased but he would only support an increase if a compensation package was developed for those earning under $100,000

In the 2016–17 Budget, Weatherill introduced Job Accelerator Grants, providing between $4,000 and $10,000 to businesses for creating new jobs, increasing in the 2017–18 budget. Weatherill claimed these grants created 10,000 jobs in their first year.

Jay Weatherill, along with then Health Minister Jack Snelling, opened the new Royal Adelaide Hospital in early September 2017. It was reported that the transition from the original Royal Adelaide Hospital to the new site was smooth with 131 patients transferred in the first day of operation. The hospital has been described as "the most advanced in the nation".

In 2017, Weatherill announced a plan to reform South Australia's electricity supply, as a response to a number of blackouts that affected large numbers of South Australian residents and businesses in 2016. The most notable was the statewide 2016 South Australian blackout. The plan included construction of a State Government-owned 250MW gas-fired power station, around 10 per cent of SA's peak demand, and grid connected utility scale battery storage (the Tesla Big Battery / Hornsdale Power Reserve) to support the grid during periods of peak demand.

The plan also included new legislative powers to ensure the South Australian energy minister could compel companies to turn on generators in peak demand periods. This was in response to AEMO ordering power be cut to tens of thousands of homes rather than instructing generators to switch on The plan also further incentivised gas exploration by increasing royalties to farmers, and ensuring that gas went to South Australians first

On 16 March 2017, Weatherill eviscerated then federal energy minister Josh Frydenberg at a press conference in Adelaide. Weatherill told Frydenberg the Federal Liberal government was the "most anti-SA government in living memory" and claimed the Federal Government's plan for Snowy Hydro 2.0 was a sign of a government in a "white-knuckled panic about national energy policy".

In September 2017, at the opening of the International Astronautical Congress held in South Australia, Weatherill announced the South Australian Space Industry Centre. The intention was for it to eventually form part of a national space agency. In a reshuffle of the South Australian Cabinet that week, Weatherill also announced the expanded the portfolio to become 'Defence and Space Industries'. The Congress in Adelaide hosted 3500 delegates from around the world, including Elon Musk of SpaceX and NASA.

In 2017, after revelations that upstream states had not been complying with the Murray-Darling Basin Plan, Weatherill requested that the Federal Government undertake a judicial enquiry or Royal Commission to determine who was to blame for “water theft” and whether upstream states had been complicit. When the Federal Government rejected the request, Weatherill then launched a South Australian Royal Commission in January 2018 to investigate. Later in 2018, after the change of state government, the Federal Government barred Murray Darling Basin Authority officials from appearing at the Royal Commission to give evidence. The Commissioner, Bret Walker SC, also wrote to SA Attorney-General Vickie Chapman asking for an extension, but this was rejected.

In February 2018, Weatherill announced that the South Australian Government and Tesla had reached an agreement to create the world's largest virtual power plant at 250MW, giving free solar panels and battery systems to 50,000 South Australian homes. Weatherill claimed it would reduce power prices directly for those involved, and indirectly for others through increased competition in the market.

=== 2018 election ===
The record-16-year-incumbent SA Labor government was seeking a fifth four-year term at the 2018 election, but was defeated by the opposition SA Liberals, led by Steven Marshall. Though a major electoral redistribution in 2016 had seen four Labor seats become notionally Liberal, Labor retained a total of 19 seats at the election. The incoming Liberal government won a total of 25 seats, with crossbench independents holding 3 seats. Despite the outcome, there was actually a statewide two-party-preferred swing away from the Liberals toward Labor of over 1%.

Four hours after the close of polls, Weatherill telephoned Steven Marshall and conceded defeat. Weatherill subsequently publicly announced that he had conceded, saying, "I'm sorry I couldn't bring home another victory, but I do feel like one of those horses that has won four Melbourne Cups and I think the handicap has caught up with us on this occasion."

Former Health Minister Peter Malinauskas became Leader of the Opposition and succeeded Weatherill who had resigned as Labor leader, with former Education Minister Susan Close as deputy, following a Labor caucus meeting on 9 April 2018.

== Post-politics ==
In June 2019, he was appointed as an industry professor at the University of South Australia. In July 2019, he was appointed to conduct a review of Federal Labor's loss at the 2019 Australian federal election. Weatherill moved to Perth in 2020 to lead the Minderoo Foundation's early childhood development arm Thrive by Five. In 2024, he joined the Leeuwin Ocean Adventure Foundation as chairman of the board. In 2025, he was appointed by arts minister Tony Burke to the Council of the National Gallery of Australia.

In November 2025, Weatherill was announced as the next High Commissioner to the United Kingdom, replacing Stephen Smith.

== Honours ==
In the 2021 Australia Day Honours, Weatherill was awarded Officer of the Order of Australia for "distinguished service to the people and Parliament of South Australia, particularly as Premier, and to early childhood and tertiary education".

== Personal life ==
Weatherill is married to Melissa, and they have two daughters. In the early days of his political career he was in a relationship with Penny Wong. He is a supporter of the Port Adelaide Football Club.

He was reported to have contracted COVID-19 at a school reunion event in Norwood, South Australia on 27 November 2021.

== See also ==
- 2018 South Australian state election
- Australian Labor Party (South Australian Branch)
- Cabinet of South Australia
- Weatherill Ministry

South Australian House of Assembly
New district	Member for Cheltenham; 2002–2018	Succeeded by Joe Szakacs
Party political offices
Preceded by Mike Rann	Leader of the Australian Labor Party (South Australian Branch); 2011–2018	Succeeded by Peter Malinauskas
Political offices
Preceded by Mike Rann	Premier of South Australia; 2011–2018	Succeeded by Steven Marshall
Preceded by Jack Snelling	Minister for the Arts; 2017–2018	Vacant
Preceded by Jack Snelling	Treasurer of South Australia; 2013–2014	Succeeded by Tom Koutsantonis
