= Yatala =

Yatala may refer to any of the following items. For all Australian places named Yatala, the etymology at Hundred of Yatala applies.

== Place names ==
=== Australia ===
==== Queensland ====
- Yatala, Queensland, a suburb of the Gold Coast

==== South Australia ====
- River Torrens in Adelaide, initially known by European explorers as the Yatala; old name for land beside the river, especially to the north, from which several local names derive:
  - Hundred of Yatala, a cadastral hundred in Adelaide,
  - District Council of Yatala a historic local government area
  - District Council of Yatala South a historic local government area
  - District Council of Yatala North a historic local government area
  - Yatala Labour Prison, a prison in Adelaide
  - Yatala Vale, South Australia, a suburb of Adelaide
  - Electoral district of Yatala, historic electorate
  - Yatala, a former suburb in the Corporate Town of Port Adelaide now in Rosewater, South Australia
- Yatala Harbor, a bay in Spencer Gulf,
  - Yatala Harbour Upper Spencer Gulf Aquatic Reserve, a protected area
- a misspelling of Yalata (disambiguation)

=== Sri Lanka ===
- Yatala Vehera, an ancient Buddhist stupa in Tissamaharama, Sri Lanka

== Other ==
- Yatala (clipper ship) a sailing ship running between England and South Australia
- Yatala (harvestman), an Arachnid genus

== See also ==
- List of ships named Yatala
