= Dan van Holst Pellekaan =

Australian politician

The Honourable Dan van Holst Pellekaan
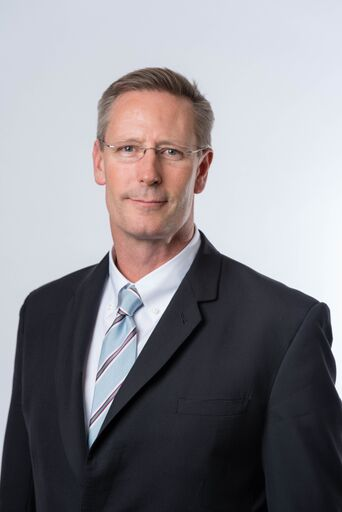

Deputy Premier of South Australia
- In office 23 November 2021 – 21 March 2022
- Premier: Steven Marshall
- Preceded by: Vickie Chapman
- Succeeded by: Susan Close

Deputy Leader of the South Australian Liberal Party
- In office 25 November 2021 – 19 April 2022
- Leader: Steven Marshall
- Preceded by: Vickie Chapman
- Succeeded by: John Gardner

Leader of Government Business in the House
- In office 29 July 2020 – 21 March 2022
- Premier: Steven Marshall
- Preceded by: Stephan Knoll
- Succeeded by: Tom Koutsantonis

Minister for Energy and Mining
- In office 22 March 2018 – 21 March 2022
- Premier: Steven Marshall
- Preceded by: Tom Koutsantonis (as Minister for Mineral Resources and Energy)
- Succeeded by: Tom Koutsantonis
Shadow ministerial positions
Shadow Minister for Energy and Mining
In office 25 January 2017 – 22 March 2018
| Leader | Steven Marshall |
| Succeeded by | Tom Koutsantonis |
Shadow Minister for Regional Development, Racing, and Sport and Recreation
In office 8 December 2011 – 6 November 2012
| Leader | Isobel Redmond |
| Preceded by | Steven Griffiths (for Regional Development) |
| Succeeded by | Mitch Williams (for Racing, Sport and Recreation) |

Member of the South Australian House of Assembly for Stuart
- In office 20 March 2010 – 19 March 2022
- Preceded by: Graham Gunn
- Succeeded by: Geoff Brock

Personal details
- Born: Daniel Cornelius van Holst Pellekaan Canberra, ACT, Australia
- Party: Liberal
- Spouse: Rebecca van Holst Pellekaan
- Education: Maret School
- Alma mater: University of Toronto; University of Tasmania (BEc)
- Occupation: Basketball player; Politician
- Basketball career

Personal information
- Listed height: 191 cm (6 ft 3 in)

Career information
- Playing career: 1985–1988
- Position: Forward

Career history
- 1985–1988: Hobart Devils

Career NBL statistics
- Points: 389 (5.8 ppg)
- Rebounds: 215 (3.2 rpb)
- Blocks: 15 (0.2 bpg)

Daniel Cornelius van Holst Pellekaan is an Australian former politician. He represented the South Australian House of Assembly seat of Stuart for the South Australian Division of the Liberal Party of Australia from 2010 state election until he lost the seat in the 2022 state election.

Van Holst Pellekaan was the Deputy Premier of South Australia between November 2021 and March 2022, and served as the Minister for Energy and Mining in the Marshall Ministry between 2018 and 2022.

== Early life and education ==
Van Holst Pellekaan was born in Canberra, to a Dutch father who had emigrated to Australia at the age of two. The family moved to Washington D.C. when his father was offered a position at the World Bank, and Dan attended the Maret School. He was active in sport, playing American football and basketball for Maret, and later moved to Canada to study and play basketball at the University of Toronto.

He moved back to Australia when he was recruited by the Hobart Devils basketball team in Tasmania, where he played for four years while studying for a Bachelor of Economics degree.

After graduating, van Holst Pellekaan moved to Melbourne to work for BP. He later moved to the outback where he and some friends bought Spud's Roadhouse in Pimba, South Australia. After seven years, he worked in other tourism ventures, then moved to Wilmington after meeting his wife, Rebecca.

== Political career ==
In Wilmington, following the announcement of the retirement of Graham Gunn, van Holst Pellekaan gained Liberal Party endorsement for the seat of Stuart; and was elected at the 2010 state election.

Following the 2018 state election, van Holst Pellekaan was appointed as the Minister for Energy and Mining. On 25 November 2021, following the resignation of Vickie Chapman as deputy party leader and Deputy Premier, van Holst Pellekaan was elected as the new deputy leader, defeating David Speirs in a party room ballot. He was sworn in as Deputy Premier of South Australia that day.

He lost his seat at the 2022 state election to independent Geoff Brock, who had transferred from the Frome following a redistribution.

Political offices
| Preceded by Tom Koutsantonis as Minister for Mineral Resources and Energy | Minister for Energy and Mining; 2018–2022 | Succeeded by Tom Koutsantonis |
| Preceded by Vickie Chapman | Deputy Premier of South Australia; 2021–2022 | Succeeded by Susan Close |
South Australian House of Assembly
| Preceded by Graham Gunn | Member for Stuart; 2010–2022 | Succeeded by Geoff Brock |
Party political offices
| Preceded by Vickie Chapman | Deputy Leader of the Liberal Party of Australia (South Australian Division); 2021–2022 | Succeeded by John Gardner |
