= List of ships of the Royal Australian Air Force =

The Royal Australian Air Force (RAAF) has operated numerous ships and other watercraft.

== Vessel classifications ==
RAAF vessel classifications include:

- 01 - Armoured Target Launch
- 02 - Rescue Launches
- 03 - Torpedo Recovery Launch
- 04 - Refueling Barge
- 05 - Refueling Barge
- 06 - Store Vessels, Large Ketches and Lighters
- 07 - Small Cabin Launch Tender & Ge neral Work Boat
- 08 - Crash Boat
- 09 - Aircraft Maintenance Scows
- 10 - Bomb Scows
- 11 - Open Hull Work Boat
- 12 - Whaler
- 13 - Pulling Dinghy
- 14 - Sailing Dinghy
- 15 - Requisitioned Vessels, Cargo Vessels and Bomb Scows
- 16 - Supply Craft
- 17 - Work Boat for General Duties
- 18 - Powered Landing Barge
- 19 - Small Lighter with a loading Derrick/Dumb Barge
- 20 - Fire Boat
- 21 - Refrigerator Freezer Barge

== Former vessels ==
Former vessels of the RAAF include:

=== A ===
- Air Mercy (925)

=== B ===
- 06.9 Betty Joan (ketch)

=== E ===
- 06.10 Ena (schooner)

=== M ===
- 08.3 Mary Ann

=== T ===
- 06.14 The Ruptured Duck (steel supply ship)

=== U ===
- 015.09 Una V

=== W ===
- SS Wanaka (requisitioned supply ship)
- 06.10 Schooner Waimana (schooner)

=== Y ===
- 06.11 Yalata (ketch)
