= Weatherill ministry =

72nd ministry of government of South Australia

- 72nd ministry of South Australia

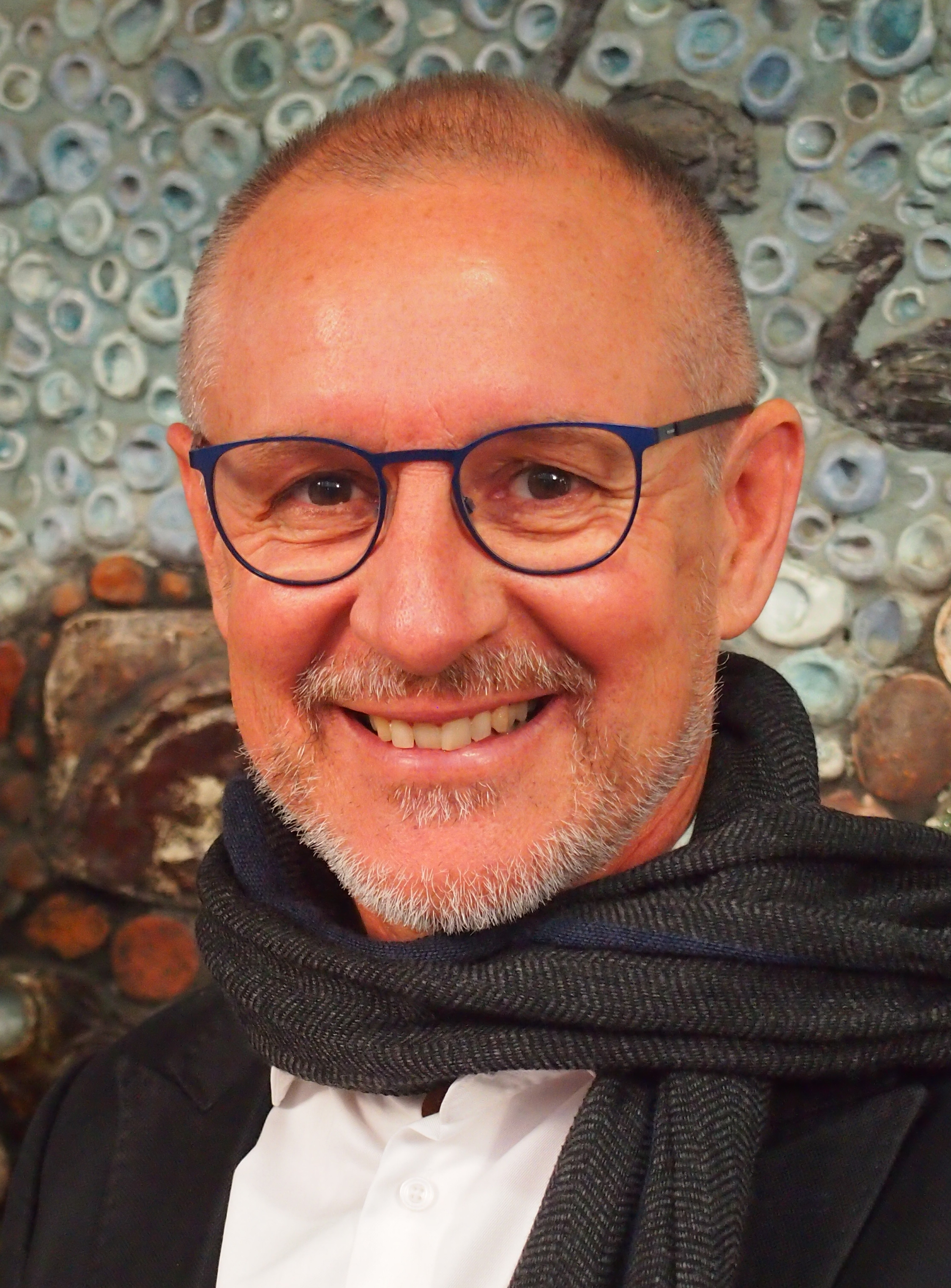
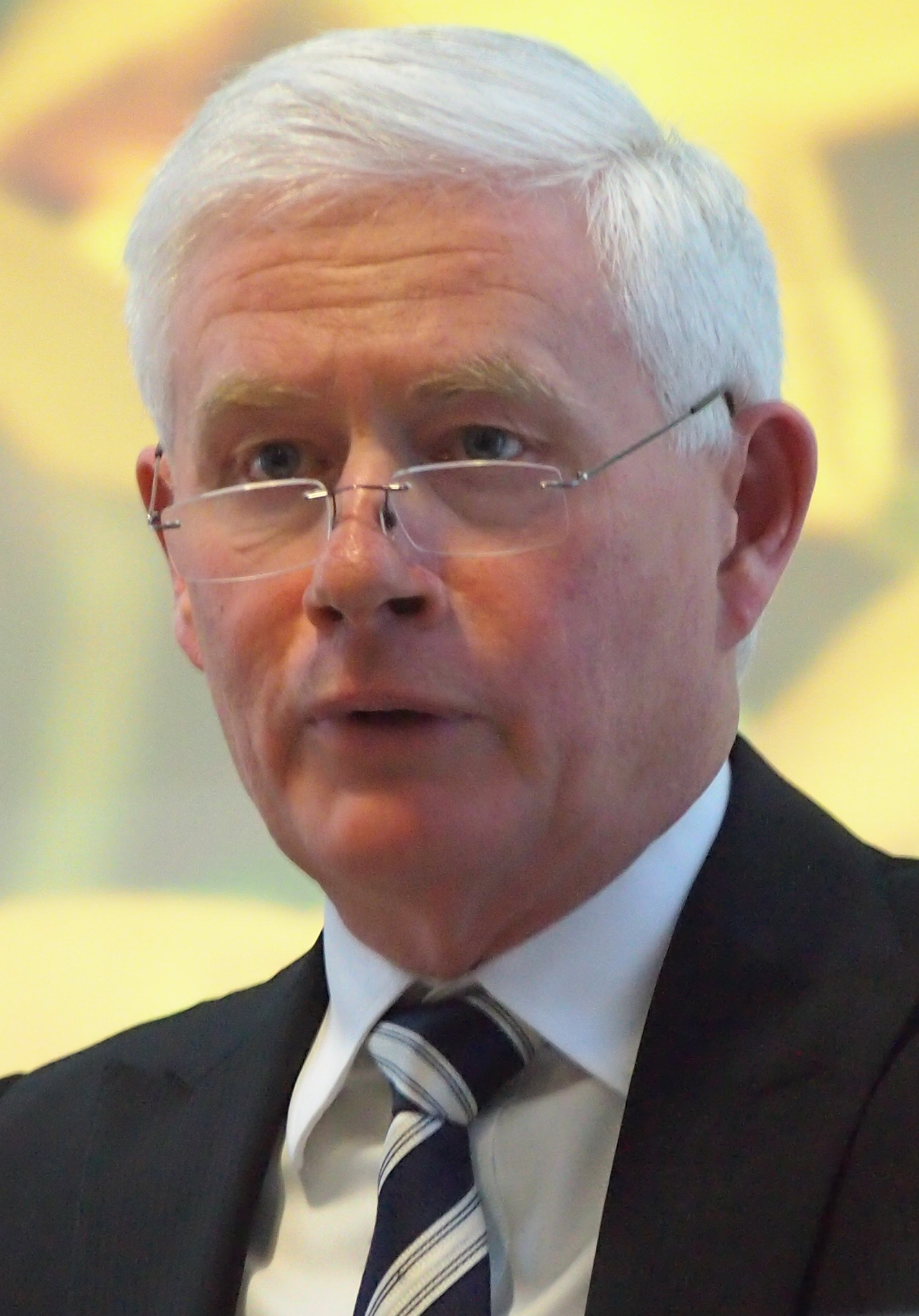
- Jay Weatherill John Rau
- Date formed: 21 October 2011
- Date dissolved: 19 March 2018

People and organisations
- Monarch: Elizabeth II
- Governor: Kevin Scarce; Hieu Van Le
- Premier: Jay Weatherill
- Deputy premier: John Rau
- No. of ministers: 15
- Member party: Labor/Independents
- Status in legislature: Majority government (2011–2014); Minority government (2014); Majority government (2014–2018)
- Opposition party: Liberal
- Opposition leader: Isobel Redmond; Steven Marshall

History
- Election: 15 March 2014
- Outgoing election: 17 March 2018
- Predecessor: Rann ministry
- Successor: Marshall ministry

The Weatherill ministry was the 72nd ministry of the Government of South Australia, led by Jay Weatherill of the South Australian Branch of the Australian Labor Party. It commenced on 21 October 2011, when Weatherill succeeded Mike Rann as Premier and Labor leader.

== Cabinet ==
| Party | Portrait | Minister | Portfolio |
|---|---|---|---|
| Labor | | Jay Weatherill (1964–) MP for Cheltenham (2002–2018) | Premier; Leader of the South Australian Labor Party; Minister for State Development (until 26 March 2014); Treasurer (21 January 2013 – 26 March 2014); Minister for the Public Sector (21 January 2013 – 26 March 2014); Minister for the Arts (21 January 2013 – 26 March 2014; from 18 September 2017); Minister for Finance (6 February 2014 – 26 March 2014); Minister for Investment and Trade (from January 2018); Minister for Small Business (from January 2018); Minister for Defence and Space Industries (from January 2018); Minister for Health Industries (from January 2018); Minister for Veterans' Affairs (from January 2018) |
| Labor | | John Rau (1959–) MP for Enfield (2002–2018) | Deputy Premier; Deputy Leader of the South Australian Labor Party; Attorney-General; Minister for Planning; Minister for Business Services and Consumers (until 26 March 2014); Minister for Industrial Relations (from 21 January 2013); Minister for Police (6 February 2014 – 26 March 2014); Minister for Correctional Services (6 February 2014 – 26 March 2014); Minister for Justice Reform (from 26 March 2014); Minister for Housing and Urban Development (26 March 2014 – 19 January 2016); Minister for Child Protection Reform (from 3 February 2015); Minister for the Public Sector (from 19 January 2016); Minister for Consumer and Business Services (from 19 January 2016); Minister for the City of Adelaide (from 19 January 2016) |
| Labor | | Gail Gago (1957–) MLC (2002–2018) | Minister for Agriculture, Food and Fisheries (until 26 March 2014); Minister for Forests (until 26 March 2014); Minister for Regional Development (until 26 March 2014); Minister for Tourism (until 21 January 2013); Minister for the Status of Women (until 19 January 2016); Minister for State/Local Government Relations (21 January 2013 – 26 March 2014); Minister for Employment, Higher Education and Skills (26 March 2014 – 19 January 2016); Minister for Science and Information Economy (26 March 2014 – 19 January 2016); Minister for Business Services and Consumers (26 March 2014 – 19 January 2016) |
| Labor | | Patrick Conlon (1959–) MP for Elder (1997–2014) | Minister for Transport and Infrastructure (until 21 January 2013); Minister for Housing and Urban Development (until 21 January 2013) |
| Labor | | Jack Snelling (1972–) MP for Playford (1997–2018) | Treasurer (until 21 January 2013); Minister for Workers Rehabilitation (until 21 January 2013); Minister for Defence Industries (until 27 May 2014); Minister for Veterans' Affairs (until 26 March 2014); Minister for Health and Ageing (21 January 2013 – 26 March 2014); Minister for Mental Health and Substance Abuse (21 January 2013 – 19 January 2016); Minister for Health (26 March 2014 – 18 September 2017); Minister for the Arts (26 March 2014 – 18 September 2017); Minister for Health Industries (26 March 2014 – 18 September 2017) |
| Labor | | John Hill (1949–) MP for Kaurna (1997–2014) | Minister for Health and Ageing (until 21 January 2013); Minister for Mental Health and Substance Abuse (until 21 January 2013); Minister for the Arts (until 21 January 2013) |
| Labor | | Jennifer Rankine MP for Wright (1997–2018) | Minister for Police (until 21 January 2013); Minister for Correctional Services (until 21 January 2013); Minister for Emergency Services (until 21 January 2013); Minister for Road Safety (until 21 January 2013); Minister for Multicultural Affairs (until 26 March 2014); Minister for Education and Child Development (21 January 2013 – 3 February 2015) |
| Labor | | Paul Caica (1957–) MP for Colton (2002–2018) | Minister for Sustainability, Environment and Conservation (until 21 January 2013); Minister for Water and the River Murray (until 21 January 2013); Minister for Aboriginal Affairs and Reconciliation (until 21 January 2013) |
| Labor | | Tom Koutsantonis (1971–) MP for West Torrens (2002–) | Minister for Mineral Resources and Energy; Minister for Manufacturing, Innovation and Trade (until 21 January 2013); Minister for Small Business (until 21 January 2013; 26 March 2014 – 19 January 2016); Minister for Transport and Infrastructure (21 January 2013 – 26 March 2014); Minister for Housing and Urban Development (21 January 2013 – 26 March 2014); Treasurer (from 26 March 2014); Minister for Finance (from 26 March 2014); Minister for State Development (from 26 March 2014); Minister for Automotive Transformation (26 March 2014 – 27 May 2014) |
| Labor | | Michael O'Brien (1949–) MP for Napier (2002–2014) | Minister for Finance (until 6 February 2014); Minister for the Public Sector (until 21 January 2013); Minister for Police (21 January 2013 – 6 February 2014); Minister for Correctional Services (21 January 2013 – 6 February 2014); Minister for Emergency Services (21 January 2013 – 6 February 2014); Minister for Road Safety (21 January 2013 – 6 February 2014) |
| Labor | | Grace Portolesi (1968–) MP for Hartley (2006–2014) | Minister for Education and Child Development (until 21 January 2013); Minister for Employment, Higher Education and Skills (21 January 2013 – 26 March 2014); Minister for Science and Information Economy (21 January 2013 – 26 March 2014) |
| Labor | | Tom Kenyon (1972–) MP for Newland (2006–2018) | Minister for Employment, Higher Education and Skills (until 21 January 2013); Minister for Science and Information Economy (until 21 January 2013); Minister for Recreation and Sport (until 21 January 2013); Minister for Manufacturing, Innovation and Trade (21 January 2013 – 26 March 2014); Minister for Small Business (21 January 2013 – 26 March 2014) |
| Labor | | Russell Wortley (1957–) MLC (2006–) | Minister for Industrial Relations (until 21 January 2013); Minister for State/Local Government Relations (until 21 January 2013) |
| Labor | | Chloë Fox (1971–) MP for Bright (2006–2014) | Minister for Transport Services (until 26 March 2014); Minister Assisting the Minister for the Arts (21 January 2013 – 26 March 2014) |
| Labor | | Ian Hunter (1960–) MLC (2006–) | Minister for Communities and Social Inclusion (until 21 January 2013); Minister for Social Housing (until 21 January 2013); Minister for Disabilities (until 21 January 2013); Minister for Youth (until 21 January 2013); Minister for Volunteers (until 21 January 2013); Minister for Sustainability, Environment and Conservation (from 21 January 2013); Minister for Water and the River Murray (from 21 January 2013); Minister for Aboriginal Affairs and Reconciliation (21 January 2013 – 3 February 2015); Minister for Emergency Services (6 February 2014 – 26 March 2014); Minister for Road Safety (6 February 2014 – 26 March 2014); Minister for Climate Change (from 3 February 2015) |
| Labor | | Tony Piccolo (1960–) MP for Light (2006–2026) | Minister for Communities and Social Inclusion (21 January 2013 – 26 March 2014); Minister for Social Housing (21 January 2013 – 26 March 2014); Minister for Disabilities (21 January 2013 – 19 January 2016); Minister for Youth (21 January 2013 – 26 March 2014); Minister for Volunteers (21 January 2013 – 26 March 2014); Minister for Police (26 March 2014 – 19 January 2016); Minister for Correctional Services (26 March 2014 – 19 January 2016); Minister for Emergency Services (26 March 2014 – 19 January 2016); Minister for Road Safety (26 March 2014 – 19 January 2016) |
| Labor | | Leon Bignell (1966–) MP for Mawson (2006–2026) | Minister for Tourism (from 21 January 2013); Minister for Recreation and Sport (from 21 January 2013); Minister for Agriculture, Food and Fisheries (from 26 March 2014); Minister for Forests (from 26 March 2014); Minister for Racing (from 26 March 2014) |
| Labor | | Susan Close (1967–) MP for Port Adelaide (2012–2026) | Minister for the Public Sector (26 March 2014 – 19 January 2016); Minister for Manufacturing, Innovation and Trade (26 March 2014 – 27 May 2014); Minister for Manufacturing and Innovation (27 May 2014 – 3 February 2015); Minister for Automotive Transformation (27 May 2014 – 3 February 2015); Minister for Education and Child Development (from 3 February 2015); Minister for Higher Education and Skills (from 19 January 2016) |
| Labor | | Stephen Mullighan MP for Lee (2014–2026) | Minister for Transport and Infrastructure (from 26 March 2014); Minister Assisting the Minister for Planning (26 March 2014 – 19 January 2016); Minister Assisting the Minister for Housing and Urban Development (26 March 2014 – 19 January 2016); Minister for Housing and Urban Development (from 19 January 2016) |
| Labor | | Zoe Bettison (1973–) MP for Ramsay (2012–) | Minister for Communities and Social Inclusion (from 26 March 2014); Minister for Social Housing (from 26 March 2014); Minister for Multicultural Affairs (from 26 March 2014); Minister for Ageing (from 26 March 2014); Minister for Youth (from 26 March 2014); Minister for Volunteers (from 26 March 2014); Minister for Veterans' Affairs (26 March 2014 – 27 May 2014); Minister for the Status of Women (from 19 January 2016) |
| Labor | | Kyam Maher MLC (2012–) | Minister for Aboriginal Affairs and Reconciliation (from 3 February 2015); Minister for Manufacturing and Innovation (from 3 February 2015); Minister for Automotive Transformation (from 3 February 2015); Minister for Employment (from 19 January 2016); Minister for Science and Information Economy (from 19 January 2016) |
| Labor | | Peter Malinauskas (1980–) MLC (2015–2018) | Minister for Police (19 January 2016 – 18 September 2017); Minister for Correctional Services (19 January 2016 – 18 September 2017); Minister for Emergency Services (19 January 2016 – 18 September 2017); Minister for Road Safety (19 January 2016 – 18 September 2017); Minister for Health (from 18 September 2017); Minister for Mental Health and Substance Abuse (from 18 September 2017) |
| Labor | | Leesa Vlahos (1966–) MP for Taylor (2010–2018) | Minister for Disabilities (19 January 2016 – 18 September 2017); Minister for Mental Health and Substance Abuse (19 January 2016 – 18 September 2017) |
| Labor | | Chris Picton (1983–) MP for Kaurna (2014–) | Minister for Police (from 18 September 2017); Minister for Correctional Services (from 18 September 2017); Minister for Emergency Services (from 18 September 2017); Minister for Road Safety (from 18 September 2017); Minister Assisting the Minister for Health (from 18 September 2017); Minister Assisting the Minister for Mental Health and Substance Abuse (from 18 September 2017) |
| Labor | | Katrine Hildyard (1970–) MP for Reynell (2014–) | Minister for Disabilities (from 18 September 2017); Minister Assisting the Minister for Recreation and Sport (from 18 September 2017) |
| Independent | | Geoff Brock (1950–) MP for Frome (2009–2022) | Minister for Regional Development (from 26 March 2014); Minister for Local Government (from 26 March 2014) |
| Independent | | Martin Hamilton-Smith (1953–) MP for Waite (1997–2018) | Minister for Investment and Trade (27 May 2014 – January 2018); Minister for Defence Industries (27 May 2014 – 18 September 2017); Minister for Veterans' Affairs (27 May 2014 – January 2018); Minister for Small Business (19 January 2016 – January 2018); Minister for Defence and Space Industries (18 September 2017 – January 2018); Minister for Health Industries (19 September 2017 – January 2018) |

== Changes in the ministry ==
=== 21 January 2013: Reshuffle ===
Weatherill made a major reshuffle of the ministry on 21 January 2013, following the resignations of a number of ministers.

=== 26 March 2014: Reshuffle ===
Weatherill reshuffled cabinet on 26 March 2014, following the government's re-election as a minority government at the 2014 state election. Independent Geoff Brock was appointed to the cabinet in exchange for his support on confidence and supply.

It was followed by two minor changes: the appointment of former Liberal leader turned independent Martin Hamilton-Smith on 27 May 2014, and the resignation of Jennifer Rankine and her replacement by Kyam Maher on 3 February 2015.

Non-Labor MHAs Hamilton-Smith and Brock joined the Labor minority government cabinet following the 2014 election. Though later that year when it became a majority government following the 2014 Fisher by-election, Hamilton-Smith and Brock were kept in cabinet.

=== 12 January 2016: Reshuffle ===
Tony Piccolo announced his resignation from cabinet on 12 January 2016, citing cabinet renewal, ahead of an imminent cabinet reshuffle. Gail Gago announced her resignation from cabinet three days later, also citing cabinet renewal.

Peter Malinauskas and Leesa Vlahos were announced as the new cabinet members on 18 January. Swearing in and portfolio allocations occurred on 19 February.

=== September 2017: Reshuffle ===
Jack Snelling announced his resignation as Minister for Health, Minister for the Arts & Minister for Health Industries on 17 September 2017, citing his desire to spend more time with family after 20 years in public life. He also announced that he would not be seeking election for the seat of Florey in 2018, after an ugly pre-selection fight with sitting member Frances Bedford. Leesa Vlahos announced her resignation as Minister for Mental Health one day later, citing her own health issues. Both ministers had been under intense scrutiny for their handling of their respective portfolios, with the Transforming Health program widely criticized, and the state's mental health facilities plagued with problems.

Chris Picton and Katrine Hildyard were announced as the new cabinet members on 18 September. Peter Malinauskas moved from his former portfolios of Police and Emergency Services, into a "super-health' portfolio as Minister for Health, and Minister for Mental Health.

Weatherill announced in 2018 a state Royal Commission into the Murray-Darling Basin Plan to investigate claims of "water theft" by upstream states after the Federal Government would not hold an inquiry, but (2019) the Commission has not reported, and an extension was refused by the new Marshall ministry.

== See also ==
- Cabinet of South Australia

== Notes ==
^{1} Geoff Brock and Martin Hamilton-Smith continued to sit as independent MHAs while serving in a Labor ministry.
