= Clement Giles =

Australian politician

Clement Giles (22 February 1844 – 19 July 1926) was an Australian politician who represented the South Australian House of Assembly multi-member seat of Frome from 1887 to 1902. He joined the National Defence League ahead of the 1893 election.

His eldest son, Nigel S. Giles, later served as chairman of the District Council of Port Germein.
