= Yatala Harbour Upper Spencer Gulf Aquatic Reserve =

Protected area in South Australia

- IUCN category II (national park)
- Location within South Australia
- Location: South Australia
- Nearest city: Port Pirie
- Coordinates: 32°45′11″S 137°54′59″E
- Area: 11.4 km^{2} (4.4 sq mi)
- Established: 28 June 1984
- Governing body: Primary Industries and Regions SA(PIRSA)

Yatala Harbour Upper Spencer Gulf Aquatic Reserve is a marine protected area in the Australian state of South Australia covering the full extent of Yatala Harbor on the east side of Spencer Gulf including land within the locality of Miranda which is subject to tidal inundation. It was declared in 1984 for the purpose of "the protection of its mangrove-seagrass communities and associated fish nursery areas". Since 2012, it has been located within the boundaries of a "sanctuary zone" within the Upper Spencer Gulf Marine Park. The aquatic reserve is classified as an IUCN Category II protected area.

== See also ==
- Protected areas of South Australia
- Yatala (disambiguation)
