= Gavin Keneally =

Australian politician (1933–2020)

Gavin Francis Keneally (5 October 1933 – 5 September 2020) was an Australian politician who represented the South Australian House of Assembly seat of Stuart from 1970 to 1989 for the Labor Party.

As the member for the seat of Stuart, Keneally served in multiple ministerial positions, including as Minister of Tourism (10 Nov 1982 - 16 Jul 1985), Minister of Local Government (10 Feb 1984 - 16 Jul 1985), and as Minster of Transport (16 Jul 1985 - 20 Apr 1989).
