= Electoral district of Stuart =

South Australian state electoral district

Stuart South Australia—House of Assembly
- Interactive map of electoral district boundaries
- State: South Australia
- Dates current: 1938–1993, 1997–present
- MP: Geoff Brock
- Party: Independent
- Namesake: John McDouall Stuart
- Electors: 28,417 (2026)
- Area: 636,489 km^{2} (245,749.8 sq mi)
- Demographic: Rural
- Coordinates: 30°14′S 137°53′E
Electorates around Stuart:
Northern Territory	Northern Territory	Queensland
Western Australia; Flinders	Stuart	New South Wales
Flinders	Ngadjuri; Narungga; Giles	Chaffey

Footnotes
- Electoral District map

Stuart is a single-member electoral district for the South Australian House of Assembly. It is a vast country district extending from the Spencer Gulf in the south as far as the Northern Territory border in the north and the Queensland and New South Wales borders in the east, and the Western Australian border to the north-west. The district includes pastoral lease and unincorporated Crown Lands, Lake Eyre, part of the Simpson Desert in the far north and the Aṉangu Pitjantjatjara Yankunytjatjara (APY) Lands. Its main population centre since the 2020 boundaries redistribution is the industrial town of Port Pirie. It has been represented by independent MP Geoff Brock since 2022.

== History ==
The electorate is named after John McDouall Stuart, who pioneered a route across through this area from the settled areas in the south to the port of Darwin in the north. This route later became the path of the overland telegraph and then The Ghan railway.

The electorate was created in the 1936 redistribution—taking effect at the 1938 election. Based on Port Augusta, it was one of the few country areas where the Labor Party did well, and for most of its existence was a comfortably safe Labor seat. It became even safer in 1977, when it absorbed Port Pirie. It was abolished in 1993. Most of its territory, including Port Augusta, was merged with the neighbouring seat of Eyre, while Port Pirie was transferred to the revived Frome.

The seat was revived ahead of the 1997 election. While the old Stuart had been a relatively compact district centred around Port Augusta and Port Pirie, the recreated Stuart was a vast electorate that stretched from Port Augusta to the Northern Territory, Queensland and New South Wales borders. It took in the eastern half of the abolished seat of Eyre, with the western half going to the Whyalla-based seat of Giles. On these boundaries, it was notionally a safe Liberal seat.

Graham Gunn, the longtime member for Eyre, transferred to Stuart, but saw his margin dwindle over the next three elections, culminating in 2006 when he won by just 233 votes after distribution of preferences. He retired at the 2010 election. His successor, former basketball player Dan van Holst Pellekaan, gained a large swing at the 2010 election, making it a safe Liberal seat in one stroke. He actually won an outright majority on the first count.

Pellekaan consolidated his hold on the seat in 2014, picking up the largest swing in the state. He picked up a further swing in 2018 as the Liberals won government, increasing his majority to 23.1 percent, the third-safest in the state. While Port Augusta still tilted toward Labor, as it had for more than a century, it was not enough to overcome the increasingly conservative bent of the rest of the seat.

A redistribution in 2020 transferred Port Pirie from Frome to Stuart. Port Pirie is as strongly Labor as Port Augusta, and its addition pared back Pellekaan's majority to 11.5 percent. Frome was held by independent Geoff Brock, who was based in the city.

In the 2022 state election, Pellekaan, who by then had become Deputy Premier, faced a challenge from Brock, who transferred from Frome. Brock defeated Pellekaan by a large margin. The swing against Pellekaan was large enough to make Stuart notionally a Labor seat in a "traditional" two-party preferred contest for the first time in its present incarnation.

== Members for Stuart ==
First incarnation (1938–1993)
Member	Party	Term
Lindsay Riches	Labor	1938–1970
Gavin Keneally	Labor	1970–1989
Colleen Hutchison	Labor	1989–1993
Second incarnation (1997–present)
Member	Party	Term
Graham Gunn	Liberal	1997–2010
Dan van Holst Pellekaan	Liberal	2010–2022
Geoff Brock	Independent	2022–present

== Election results ==
2026 South Australian state election: Stuart
Party	Candidate	Votes	%	±%
Independent	Geoff Brock	8,603	38.4	+1.7
One Nation	Brandon Turton	6,236	27.8	+21.3
Liberal	Leon Stephens	3,836	17.1	−14.9
Labor	David Ewings	1,988	8.9	−9.4
Greens	Poppy Pilmore	875	3.9	+1.2
Legalise Cannabis	Jessica McKinnon	473	2.1	+2.1
Australian Family	Stephen Tonkin	219	1.0	+1.0
Animal Justice	Robyn Parnell	180	0.8	+0.8
Total formal votes		22,410	96.8	−0.8
Informal votes		733	3.2	+0.8
Turnout		23,143	81.4	−5.6
Two-candidate-preferred result
Independent	Geoff Brock	12,757	56.9	−10.2
One Nation	Brandon Turton	9,653	43.1	+43.1
Independent hold		Swing	−10.2	
