= Peter Malinauskas =

Australian politician and trade unionist (born 1980)

The Honourable Peter Malinauskas MP
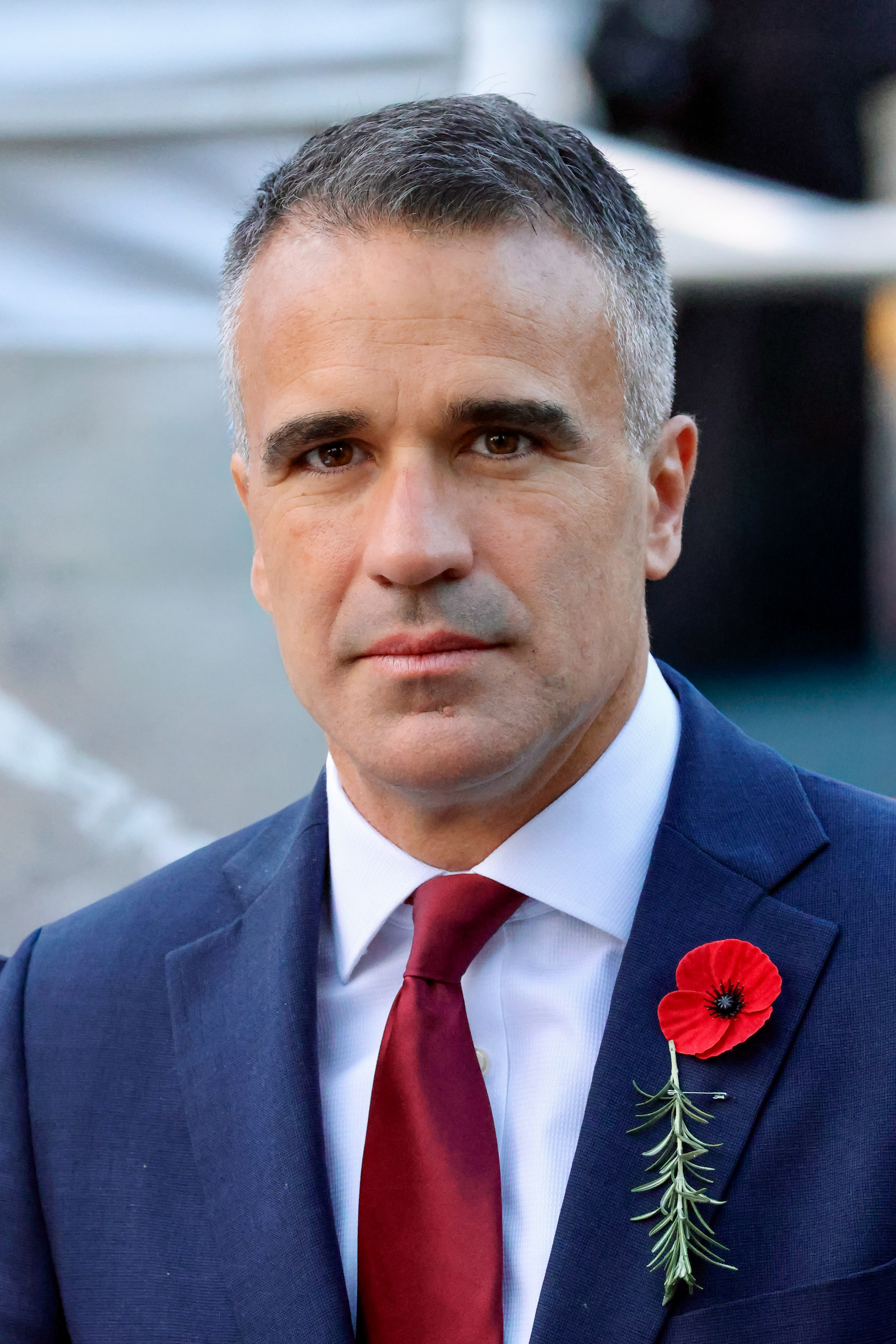
- Malinauskas in 2026

47th Premier of South Australia
- Incumbent
- Assumed office 21 March 2022
- Monarchs: Elizabeth II (2022); Charles III (2022–present)
- Governor: Frances Adamson; Richard Harris (acting); Grant Stevens (designate)
- Deputy: Susan Close (2022–2025); Kyam Maher (2025–present)
- Preceded by: Steven Marshall

Leader of the South Australian Labor Party
- Incumbent
- Assumed office 9 April 2018
- Deputy: Susan Close (2018–2025); Kyam Maher (2025–present)
- Preceded by: Jay Weatherill

Leader of the Opposition in South Australia
- In office 9 April 2018 – 21 March 2022
- Premier: Steven Marshall
- Deputy: Susan Close
- Preceded by: Steven Marshall
- Succeeded by: David Speirs
Ministerial positions
Minister for Defence and Space Industries
In office 19 September 2025 – 25 March 2026
Premier	Himself
Preceded by	Susan Close
Succeeded by	Chris Picton
Minister for Health
In office 18 September 2017 – 19 March 2018
Premier	Jay Weatherill
Preceded by	Jack Snelling
Succeeded by	Stephen Wade (as Minister for Health and Wellbeing)
Minister for Mental Health and Substance Abuse
In office 18 September 2017 – 19 March 2018
Premier	Jay Weatherill
Preceded by	Leesa Vlahos
Succeeded by	Stephen Wade (as Minister for Health and Wellbeing)
Minister for Police, Minister for Correctional Services, Minister for Emergency Services and Minister for Road Safety
In office 19 January 2016 – 18 September 2017
Premier	Jay Weatherill
Preceded by	Tony Piccolo
Succeeded by	Chris Picton

Member of the South Australian House of Assembly for Croydon
- Incumbent
- Assumed office 17 March 2018
- Preceded by: Michael Atkinson

Member of the South Australian Legislative Council
- In office 1 December 2015 – 16 February 2018
- Preceded by: Bernard Finnigan
- Succeeded by: Reggie Martin

Personal details
- Born: Peter Bryden Malinauskas; 14 August 1980 (age 46) Adelaide, South Australia
- Party: Labor
- Spouse: Annabel West
- Children: 4
- Education: Mercedes College
- Alma mater: University of Adelaide
- Cabinet: Shadow; First; Second
- Website: premier.sa.gov.au
- Nickname: Mali
- Peter Malinauskas's voice Malinauskas speaking about ASEAN; Recorded 26 August 2025

Peter Bryden Malinauskas (/ˌmælɪˈnaʊskəs/ MAL-in-OW-skəs; Lithuanian: [mɐ.lʲɪ.nɐʊ̯.skɐs]; born 14 August 1980) is an Australian politician and trade unionist who has served as the 47th premier of South Australia since 2022. He has held office as the leader of the South Australian Labor Party and as the member of the House of Assembly (MP) for the division of Croydon since 2018, having previously served in the Legislative Council from 2015 to 2018.

Malinauskas was born in Adelaide to parents of Hungarian and Lithuanian descent. He attended Mercedes College, and studied commerce at the University of Adelaide. In 2008, he was appointed as the Secretary of the South Australian/Northern Territory branch of the Shop, Distributive and Allied Employees Association (SDA), serving until 2015. Malinauskas was appointed to fill a casual vacancy in the Legislative Council on 1 December 2015, following the parliamentary resignation of Bernard Finnigan. During the Weatherill government, Malinauskas initially served as the Minister for Police, Minister for Correctional Services, Minister for Emergency Services and Minister for Road Safety before serving as the Minister for Health and the Minister for Mental Health and Substance Abuse. At the 2018 state election, Malinauskas contested and won the safe Labor seat of Croydon after the retirement of former member Michael Atkinson. His party, led by Jay Weatherill, was defeated at the election, ending 16 years in government. After Weatherill's resignation, Malinauskas was elected leader of the party with Susan Close as his deputy. After just a single term as Leader of the Opposition, Malinauskas led his party to landslide victories at the 2022 and 2026 state elections.

As a member of Labor Right, the dominant faction within the South Australian branch of the Labor Party, and as a powerful figure within the relatively pro-business SDA, his political views have been described as centrist, while he has described his personal views as socially conservative. Throughout his premiership, Malinauskas has remained one of the most popular politicians in Australia; in the lead up to the 2026 state election, a YouGov poll placed his net approval rating at +40%, with the same poll having 67% of respondents naming him as preferred premier.

== Early life and education ==
Malinauskas was born in South Australia to Kathryn (Kate) née May and Peter Malinauskas Jr. on 14 August 1980. Malinauskas's paternal Hungarian grandmother Eta survived World War II and escaped the post-war communist Hungarian state when she emigrated to Bathurst in New South Wales. She married Peter Malinauskas Sr., a Lithuanian refugee, and the couple moved to Adelaide, later opening a fish and chip shop. Malinauskas's mother's ancestors were middle-class Irish.

In his school years, Malinauskas's family resided in Colonel Light Gardens. Being from a Catholic family, Malinauskas was sent to Mercedes College where he displayed leadership potential in Australian rules football and cricket, as well as excelling in his studies. He was a member of the student representative council and was school captain in year 12 in 1998. Mercedes College principal Peter Daw recalled Malinauskas as being "a future leader". Additionally, Daw recalled Malinauskas as being "one of those kids involved in lots of things" and a "popular lad" with a "magnetic personality that appealed to teachers and students alike". He studied commerce at the University of Adelaide and joined the ALP whilst studying.

== Union figure ==
Malinauskas worked at a Woolworths supermarket for seven years from 1995 at age 15, first as a trolley boy and later a checkout operator and night filler. He formed an early and enduring political relationship with Don Farrell through Woolworths workers' unionism. He became an influential union official who served from 2008 to 2015 as Secretary of the South Australian/Northern Territory branch of the Shop, Distributive and Allied Employees Association (SDA), the major player in the dominant Labor Right faction of the South Australian branch of the Australian Labor Party. In August 2011, some media outlets claimed Malinauskas was the sole "faceless man" who informed Mike Rann he had lost the support of his party and to step down as premier of South Australia in favour of Jay Weatherill. Malinauskas was elected in July 2015 to Labor's National Executive at the party's National Conference.

== Political career ==
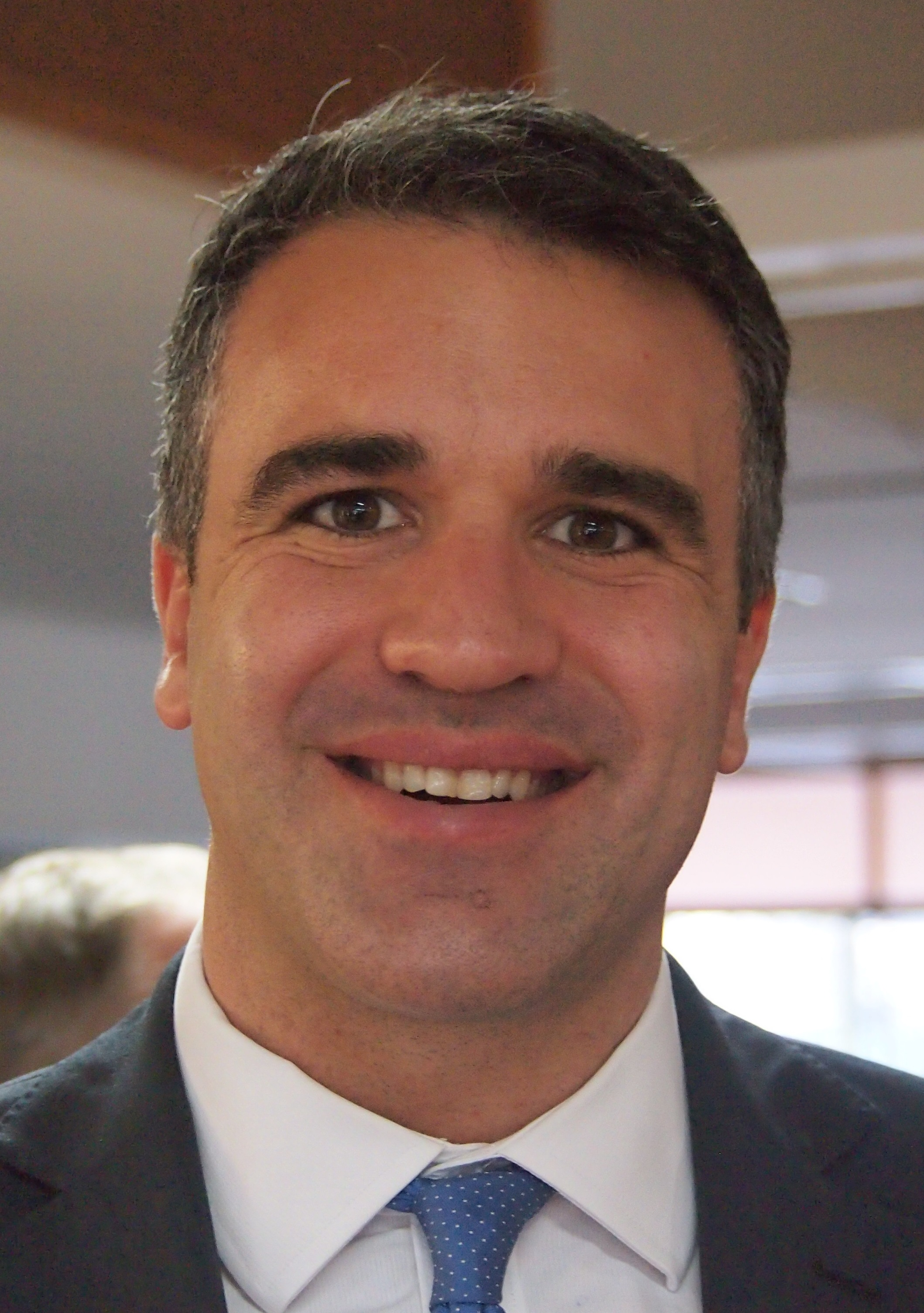
Malinauskas in 2016

=== Legislative Council (2015–2018) ===
Following the parliamentary resignation of Bernard Finnigan on 12 November 2015, Malinauskas filled the Legislative Council casual vacancy in a joint sitting of the Parliament of South Australia on 1 December.

Premier Jay Weatherill indicated that Malinauskas could enter the Cabinet of South Australia in an early 2016 ministerial reshuffle, with reports of media speculation and internal party talk suggesting Malinauskas could potentially become the next Labor premier of South Australia, entering the House of Assembly through preselection as the next Labor candidate in Labor's safest lower house seat of Croydon with claims that incumbent Michael Atkinson "has long been willing to vacate his seat to Malinauskas if he ever wanted it". Atkinson announced in February 2017 that he would be retiring from parliament as of the 2018 election. Malinauskas confirmed he would be nominating for preselection.

Malinauskas served in the cabinet in the Weatherill ministry between January 2016 and March 2018, holding, at various times, ministerial portfolios with responsibility for police (2016–2017), correctional services (2016–2017), emergency services (2016–2017), road safety (2016–2017), health (2017–2018), and mental health and substance abuse (2017–2018).

=== Leader of the Opposition (2018–2022) ===
Malinauskas won the seat of Croydon at the 2018 election.

Following the resignation of Jay Weatherill after the 2018 election, a caucus meeting on 9 April 2018 elected Malinauskas as Labor Leader. He consequently became Leader of the Opposition, with former Education Minister Susan Close as his deputy.

In April 2021, former Labor MP Annabel Digance and her husband were arrested and charged with attempting to blackmail Malinauskas. Police alleged that the couple had threatened to make accusations against Malinauskas if he did not orchestrate Digance's return to politics by preselection for a safe seat or appointment to the Legislative Council or the Senate. The charges against the Digances were withdrawn in April 2023.

In March 2022, Malinauskas led the party to victory at the state election, winning 26 seats on an eight-seat swing party after making healthcare a theme during the election. He was sworn in as premier of South Australia on 21 March 2022.

== Premier of South Australia (2022–present) ==
=== First term (2022–2026) ===
In May 2022, the government ended South Australia's state of emergency for the COVID-19 pandemic in South Australia, after 793 consecutive days.

Soon after the election, Malinauskas pledged to implement a state-based First Nations Voice to Parliament, as well as restarting treaty talks and greater investment in areas affecting Aboriginal South Australians. In July 2022 Dale Agius was appointed as the state's first Commissioner for First Nations Voice, with the role commencing in August. The South Australian state-based Voice was delayed until 2024, because of the 2023 Australian Indigenous Voice referendum. Elections took place on 16 March 2024, with Maher describing it as a successful election despite the low turnout, saying that it would take time to build awareness and engagement.

In April 2024, after a public outcry following the announcement that a developer was going to gut the historic Crown & Anchor pub, famed for its live music, and build high-rise student housing above its facade, Malinauskas intervened, placing the building under provisional state heritage-listing to protect it until its heritage values could be fully assessed, a decision supported by opposition leader David Speirs.

Also in April 2024, Malinauskas intervened to launch a review panel to examine a plan to restructure the South Australian Museum, which had included cutting out 27 research positions. He said that both the previous government and his government had made cuts to the museum's budget.

The Malinauskas government introduced a range of initiatives, including educational reforms. One of these is introducing compulsory civics subject into the school curriculum. It has also introduced a number of 24/7 pharmacies, and continued efforts to reduce ambulance ramping through investments in increased bed capacity and building ambulance stations.

On 8 September 2024, the Malinauskas government proposed a new law, in the Children (Social Media Safety) Bill 2024, to ban children under 14 from accessing social media, and to require parental consent for children aged 14 and 15. The bill followed a review by the former Chief Justice of the High Court, Robert French. Shortly afterwards, Malinauskas supported the federal Labor government's age verification system for social media use.

On 27 November 2024, the Electoral (Accountability and Integrity) Amendment Act 2024 was passed. The Act bans political donations and imposes mandatory expenditure caps on parties, candidates, and third parties. It is the first such law reform in the world.

In January 2026, Malinauskas called upon the Adelaide Writers' Week to ban Palestinian-Australian author Randa Abdel-Fattah for her pro-Palestinian comments, culminating in the Adelaide Writers' Week boycott. As a result of the boycott, the festival was cancelled. Malinauskas had previously alluded to potentially defunding the festival, a move he ruled out as an example of Putinism. His intervention led to intense discussion around political interference and freedom of political communication. Malinauskas denied responsibility for the cancellation of Adelaide Writers' Week.

=== Second term (2026–present) ===
At the 2026 state election, Malinauskas led the Labor Party to one of the most comprehensive victories at the state level in Australia. Labor won 34 seats on a seven-seat swing, the most that SA Labor has ever won at an election. It also resulted in the second-largest majority government in South Australian history, with the Liberal opposition reduced to only five seats, the fewest for either major party since the establishment of the two-party system in 1910. The Liberals retained opposition status by just one seat over One Nation on the crossbench, who won four seats off the Liberals.

Following his election in March 2026, Malinauskas was subject to further controversies relating to his stance on environmental issues. These include his response to the 2025 algal bloom, unprecedented tree felling and construction projects in the National Heritage listed Adelaide Park Lands, and his support for the retraction on the moratorium of fracking in the South East region of South Australia despite earlier commitments to uphold the ban.

In August 2026, the government announced a Royal Commission into Artificial Intelligence, with a focus on formulating policy solutions to the risks posed by AI. The Royal Commission commenced on 1 October 2026, with its final report due by 1 July 2027. Three commissioners were appointed to lead the commission: Iain Ross, Kate Pounder, and Christopher Manning.

== Political positions ==
Malinauskas is a member of the Labor Right faction. His views have been described as centrist.

Asked about progressive political issues in 2011 such as same sex marriage, stem-cell research, euthanasia, and abortion, Malinauskas said his personal views would be "considered socially conservative", saying "I didn't get involved in the Australian labour movement because of any of these issues". Malinauskas voted to decriminalise abortion in 2021, but in 2026 voted in favour of a bill to restrict abortion.

Asked about nuclear power in South Australia, Malinauskas in 2014 said he was pro-nuclear despite Labor at the time remaining opposed to the establishment of a new nuclear waste repository or nuclear power plant in South Australia. Malinauskas stated "I believe climate change is a real challenge we need to face up to, and nuclear energy can be a safe source of baseload power, with zero carbon emissions". In March 2015 Labor initiated a Nuclear Fuel Cycle Royal Commission, and in 2016 launched a "Get to know nuclear" campaign to further explore the commission's findings.

== Personal life ==
Malinauskas is Catholic and married to Annabel West, a lawyer based in Adelaide. The couple has two daughters and two sons.

Following the 2022 Russian invasion of Ukraine, Malinauskas was listed among 121 Australians banned from entering Russia. He later said that he was "grateful" to be included on the list.

Malinauskas played Australian rules football for the Adelaide University Football Club from 2012. He retired at the end of the 2023 Adelaide Footy League season.

== See also ==
- 2030 South Australian state election#Opinion polling

Parliament of South Australia
Preceded by Bernard Finnigan	Member of the South Australian Legislative Council; 2015–2018; Served alongside: Multiple members	Succeeded by Multiple members
Preceded by Michael Atkinson	Member for Croydon; 2018–present	Incumbent
Political offices
Preceded by Tony Piccolo	Minister for Police; 2016–2017	Succeeded by Chris Picton
Preceded by Tony Piccolo	Minister for Correctional Services; 2016–2017	Succeeded by Chris Picton
Preceded by Tony Piccolo	Minister for Emergency Services; 2016–2017	Succeeded by Chris Picton
Preceded by Tony Piccolo	Minister for Road Safety; 2016–2017	Succeeded by Chris Picton
Preceded by Jack Snelling	Minister for Health; 2017–2018	Succeeded by Stephen Wade as Minister for Health and Wellbeing
Preceded by Leesa Vlahos	Minister for Mental Health and Substance Abuse; 2017–2018	Succeeded by Stephen Wade as Minister for Health and Wellbeing
Preceded by Steven Marshall	Leader of the Opposition in South Australia; 2018–2022	Succeeded by Steven Marshall
Preceded by Steven Marshall	Premier of South Australia; 2022–present	Incumbent
Preceded by Susan Close	Minister for Defence and Space Industries; 2025–2026	Succeeded by Chris Picton
Party political offices
Preceded by Jay Weatherill	Leader of the South Australian Labor Party; 2018–present	Incumbent
