= Electoral results for the district of King (South Australia) =

Election results for King, South Australia

This is a list of electoral results for the district of King in South Australian state elections.

== Members for King ==
Member	Party	Term
Paula Luethen	Liberal	2018–2022
Rhiannon Pearce	Labor	2022–present

== Election results ==
=== Elections in the 2020s ===
==== 2026 ====
2026 South Australian state election: King
Party	Candidate	Votes	%	±%
Labor	Rhiannon Pearce	11,106	43.0	−0.2
One Nation	David Kerrison	7,924	30.7	+30.7
Liberal	Amanda Hendry	3,101	12.0	−28.2
Greens	Samuel Moore	2,405	9.3	+3.7
Family First	Julie Glasgow	636	2.5	−1.1
Real Change	Adriana Haynes	191	0.7	−0.6
Australian Family	Angela Zakarias	165	0.6	−3.0
United Voice	Lukas Gleeson	153	0.6	+0.6
Fair Go	Tyla Finlay	120	0.5	+0.5
Total formal votes		25,801	96.3	±0.0
Informal votes		985	3.7	±0.0
Turnout		26,786	90.1	−1.6
Two-candidate-preferred result
Labor	Rhiannon Pearce	14,125	55.2	+2.3
One Nation	David Kerrison	11,459	44.8	+44.8
Labor hold				

==== 2022 ====
2022 South Australian state election: King
Party	Candidate	Votes	%	±%
Labor	Rhiannon Pearce	10,366	43.2	+8.9
Liberal	Paula Luethen	9,644	40.2	+3.5
Greens	Kate Randell	1,347	5.6	−0.2
Family First	Alisha Minahan	874	3.6	+3.6
Australian Family	Alex Banks	865	3.6	+3.6
Animal Justice	Frankie Bray	604	2.5	+2.5
Real Change	Jodi Hutchinson	308	1.3	+1.3
Total formal votes		24,008	96.3	
Informal votes		934	3.7	
Turnout		24,942	91.7	
Two-party-preferred result
Labor	Rhiannon Pearce	12,692	52.9	+3.5
Liberal	Paula Luethen	11,316	47.1	−3.5
Labor gain from Liberal		Swing	+3.5	

Distribution of preferences: King
Party	Candidate	Votes	Round 1		Round 2		Round 3		Round 4		Round 5	
Party	Candidate	Votes	Dist.	Total	Dist.	Total	Dist.	Total	Dist.	Total	Dist.	Total
Quota (50% + 1)		12,005										
Labor	Rhiannon Pearce	10,366	+26	10,392	+209	10,601	+73	10,674	+951	11,625	+1,067	12,692
Liberal	Paula Luethen	9,644	+24	9,668	+74	9,742	+125	9,867	+376	10,243	+1,073	11,316
Greens	Kate Randell	1,347	+37	1,384	+212	1,596	+95	1,691	Excluded			
Family First	Alisha Minahan	874	+63	937	+103	1,040	+736	1,776	+364	2,140	Excluded	
Australian Family	Alex Banks	865	+97	962	+67	1,029	Excluded					
Animal Justice	Frankie Bray	604	+61	665	Excluded							
Real Change	Jodi Hutchinson	308	Excluded									

=== Elections in the 2010s ===
==== 2018 ====
2018 South Australian state election: King
Party	Candidate	Votes	%	±%
Liberal	Paula Luethen	8,932	36.8	−4.7
Labor	Julie Duncan	8,298	34.1	−7.0
SA-Best	Giles Rositano	4,519	18.6	+18.6
Greens	Damon Adams	1,412	5.8	−0.6
Conservatives	Gary Balfort	1,138	4.7	−3.7
Total formal votes		24,299	96.0	−0.3
Informal votes		1,016	4.0	+0.3
Turnout		25,315	93.1	+4.6
Two-party-preferred result
Liberal	Paula Luethen	12,328	50.7	+0.7
Labor	Julie Duncan	11,971	49.3	−0.7
Liberal gain from Labor		Swing	+0.7	
