= Para Hills West, South Australia =

Para Hills West
- Suburb
- Coordinates: 34°48′9″S 138°38′41″E
- Country: Australia
- State: South Australia
- City: Adelaide
- LGA: City of Salisbury
- Location: 4 km (2.5 mi) south of Salisbury

Government
  - State electorate: Playford
  - Federal division: Makin

Population
  - Total: 3,295 (SAL 2021)
- Postcode: 5096
Suburbs around Para Hills West
Salisbury South	Salisbury East	Gulfview Heights
Parafield	Para Hills West	Para Hills
Mawson Lakes	Pooraka	Ingle Farm
- Surrounding suburb directions displayed as if Main North Road and Bridge Road point north, but they are actually NNE.

Para Hills West (pronounced /ˈpærə/) is a suburb of Adelaide, South Australia, and is within the City of Salisbury. It is on the eastern side of Main North Road, opposite Parafield Airport. The other boundaries are McIntyre Road, Bridge Road and Maxwell Road.

It has two schools, Para Hills West Primary School and Para Hills High School.
