= Greenwith, South Australia =

Greenwith
- Suburb
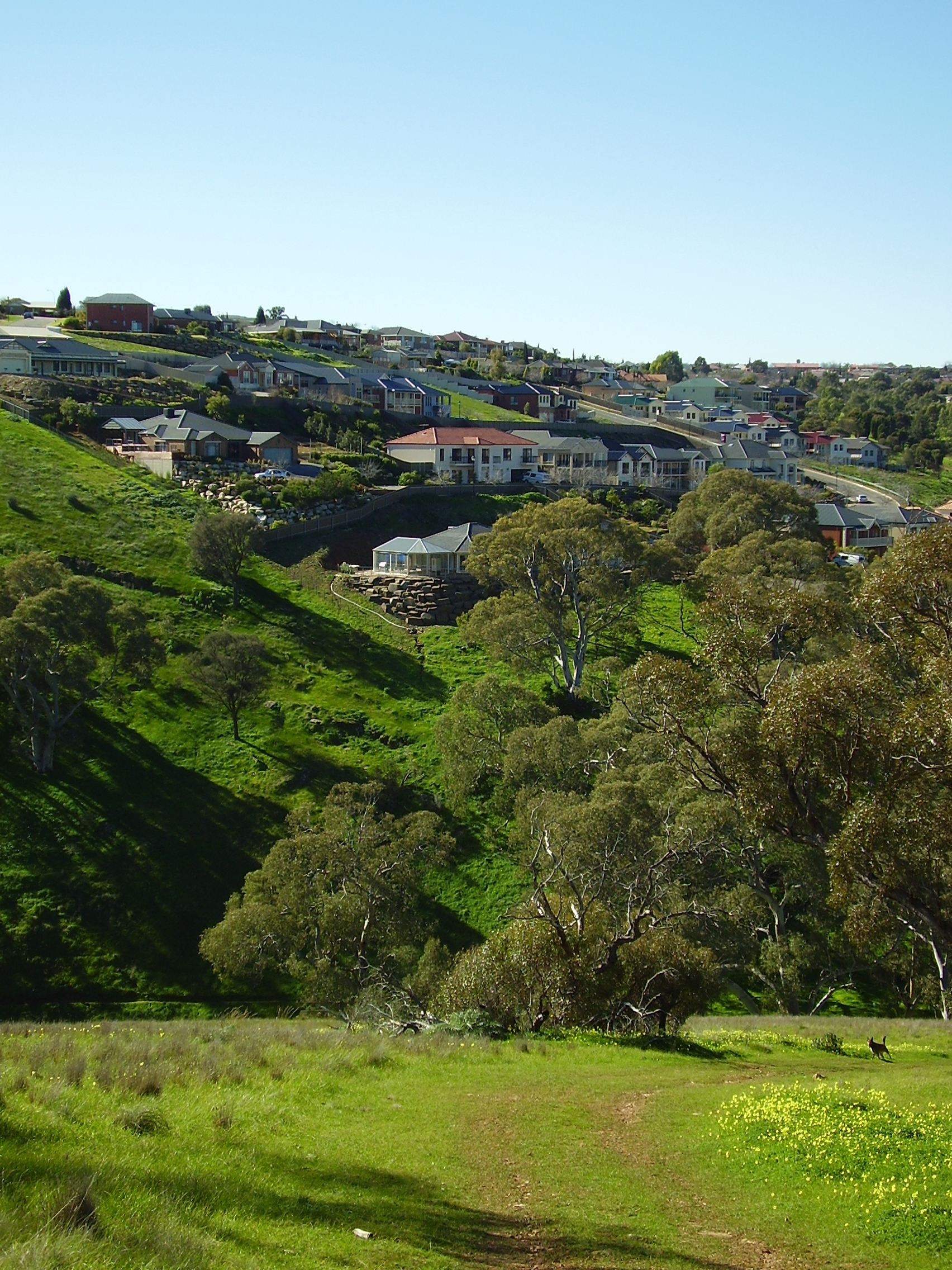
- Part of Greenwith from adjacent Cobbler Creek Recreation Park

- Country: Australia
- State: South Australia
- City: Adelaide
- LGA: City of Tea Tree Gully
- Location: 8 km (5.0 mi) from Modbury
- Established: 1985

Government
  - State electorate: King
  - Federal division: Makin

Population
  - Total: 10,103 (SAL 2021)
- Postcode: 5125
Suburbs around Greenwith
	Gould Creek
Salisbury Heights	Greenwith	Yatala Vale
Salisbury East	Golden Grove

Greenwith is an outer-north-eastern suburb of Adelaide, the capital city of South Australia, and is within the City of Tea Tree Gully local government area. It is adjacent to Golden Grove and Salisbury Heights. Greenwith is the northernmost part of the Golden Grove urban land development.

== History ==
Greenwith was named by Thomas Roberts in 1846, who had been engaged by the South Australian Mining Association to open up mineral sections along the River Torrens. He named his property Greenwith Farm after the mine at which he worked near Truro, Cornwall. The property was later owned by John Garfield Tilley. Greenwith Cottage is still open today as a historical site. It retains the pronunciation from Greenwith in Cornwall as "green-with".

In 1973 the South Australian Land Commission started to acquire land in the Golden Grove area for housing. In 1983 the South Australian Urban Land Trust contracted Delfin to develop the land. Construction started in 1985.

In April 2017, following a community consultation, the City of Tea Tree Gully renamed its section of the Salisbury Heights suburb to "Greenwith", increasing the suburb by 20%.

== Geography ==
The boundary of Greenwith is defined by Slate and Cobbler Creeks in the south, Green Valley Drive in the west, Golden Grove and Para Roads in the east, and the Little Para River catchment area in the north. From Greenwith there is easy access to the Adelaide Hills and Barossa Valley wine region via One Tree Hill or Upper Hermitage.

At the ABS 2001 census, Golden Grove had a population of 8,287 people living in 3,071 dwellings.

== Facilities ==
Greenwith is hilly with numerous park areas, most with children's playgrounds and several with lakes, creeks, or scenic walking trails, including the Para Wirra Conservation Park and Cobbler Creek Recreation Park. Many of the lakes are suitable for fishing, and it is not openly discouraged by the local authorities. The lakes in particular have carp and guppies, and the rare yabbie or two.

Greenwith has two primary schools, Greenwith Primary School and Our Lady of Hope School, on a combined campus. The Catholic Church in the suburb is dedicated to Our Lady of Hope.

Greenwith has a community centre and small shopping village, and a shopping centre opened in 2015. A dirt bike track nearby is used by local children and teenagers.

== Transport ==
Greenwith is connected to the Adelaide CBD by Adelaide Metro bus route J2 (C2X in express times) (operated by Torrens Transit) via Golden Grove Village, Tea Tree Plaza Interchange in Modbury and the O-Bahn Busway, route 548 (also operated by Torrens Transit), via Golden Grove Road and the O-Bahn Busway from Tea Tree Plaza Interchange to the city and also route 415 to Salisbury railway interchange. It has 4 local Adelaide Metro minibus routes (G1, G2, G3 and RZ4) from Golden Grove Village to different parts of Greenwith, which also connect with frequent buses to and from the Adelaide CBD via Tea Tree Plaza Interchange and the O-Bahn Busway.

=== Local Loop Services ===
Services 7 days a week approximately one bus an hour

- 591A Golden Grove-Greenwith Anti-Clockwise Loop via Atlantis Drive, The Golden Way, Thornton Drive, Green Valley Drive and Reuben Richardson Drive.
- 591C Golden Grove-Greenwith Clockwise Loop via Atlantis Drive, The Golden Way, Thornton Drive, Green Valley Drive and Reuben Richardson Drive.
- 592 Golden Grove-Greenwith Anti-Clockwise Loop via Bicentennial Drive, John Road, Golden Grove Road and The Golden Way.
- 593A Golden Grove-Greenwith Anti-Clockwise Loop via Atlantis Drive, The Golden Way, Thornton Drive, Green Valley Drive, Reuben Richardson Drive, Bicentennial Drive, John Road, Golden Grove Road and The Golden Way.
- 593C Golden Grove-Greenwith Clockwise Loop via Atlantis Drive, The Golden Way, Thornton Drive, Green Valley Drive, Reuben Richardson Drive, Bicentennial Drive, John Road, Golden Grove Road and The Golden Way.

=== City Buses ===
==== Peak Time ====
- 548 Greenwith To City via Golden Grove Road and O-Bahn Busway
- C2X Greenwith To City via Target Hill Rd, The Golden Way Express via O-Bahn Busway From Stop 50 Golden Grove Road

==== Off Peak Time ====
Last Bus Starts about 3 PM

- J2 Greenwith to City via Golden Grove Village and O-Bahn Busway Limited Stop Service
- 548 Greenwith To Tea Tree Plaza via Golden Grove Road All Stops

== Notable residents ==
- Jack Graham, Australian rules footballer for Richmond and West Coast
- Reece Mastin, English-Australian singer and songwriter, winner of the third season of The X Factor Australia

== See also ==
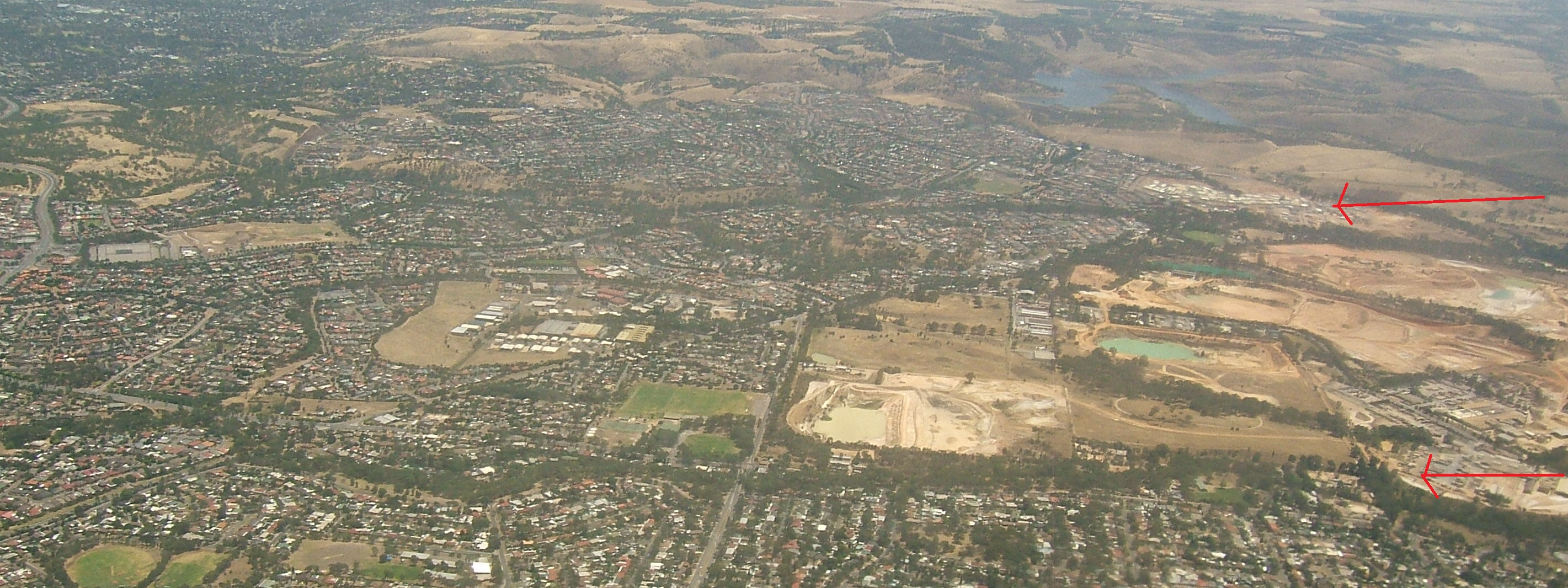
Aerial image of the Golden Grove and Greenwith areas, looking north. Greenwith is to the north, and the border is Cobbler Creek, which is straddled by a treeline indicated by the upper red arrow. The southern border of Golden Grove is indicated approximately by the southern treeline marked by the arrow. The triangle in the southwestern corner of the photo is Surrey Downs, and to the southeastern corner is Fairview Park. Little Para Reservoir is the body of water. The light patches on the eastern part of the image are quarries.

- City of Tea Tree Gully
- List of Adelaide suburbs
