= Salisbury Plain, South Australia =

Salisbury Plain
- Suburb
- Coordinates: 34.76706°S 138.66033°E
- Country: Australia
- State: South Australia
- City: Adelaide
- LGA: City of Salisbury
- Location: 19 km (12 mi) from Adelaide CBD
- Established: 1800

Government
  - Federal division: Spence

Population
  - Total: 1,333 (SAL 2021)
- Postcode: 5109
Suburbs around Salisbury Plain
Salisbury	Salisbury Park	Salisbury Heights
Brahma Lodge	Salisbury Plain	Salisbury Heights
Golden Grove and Gulfview Heights	Salisbury East	Salisbury South

Salisbury Plain is a suburb located in the City of Salisbury, Adelaide, South Australia. It lies near the much larger suburbs of Salisbury, Salisbury East and Salisbury Downs.
