= Electoral district of King =

Electoral district of King may refer to:

- Electoral district of King (New South Wales), a former electorate of the New South Wales Legislative Assembly
- Electoral district of King (South Australia), an electorate of the South Australian House of Assembly since 2018
