= Parafield Airport Air Traffic Control Tower =

Historic air traffic control tower in South Australia

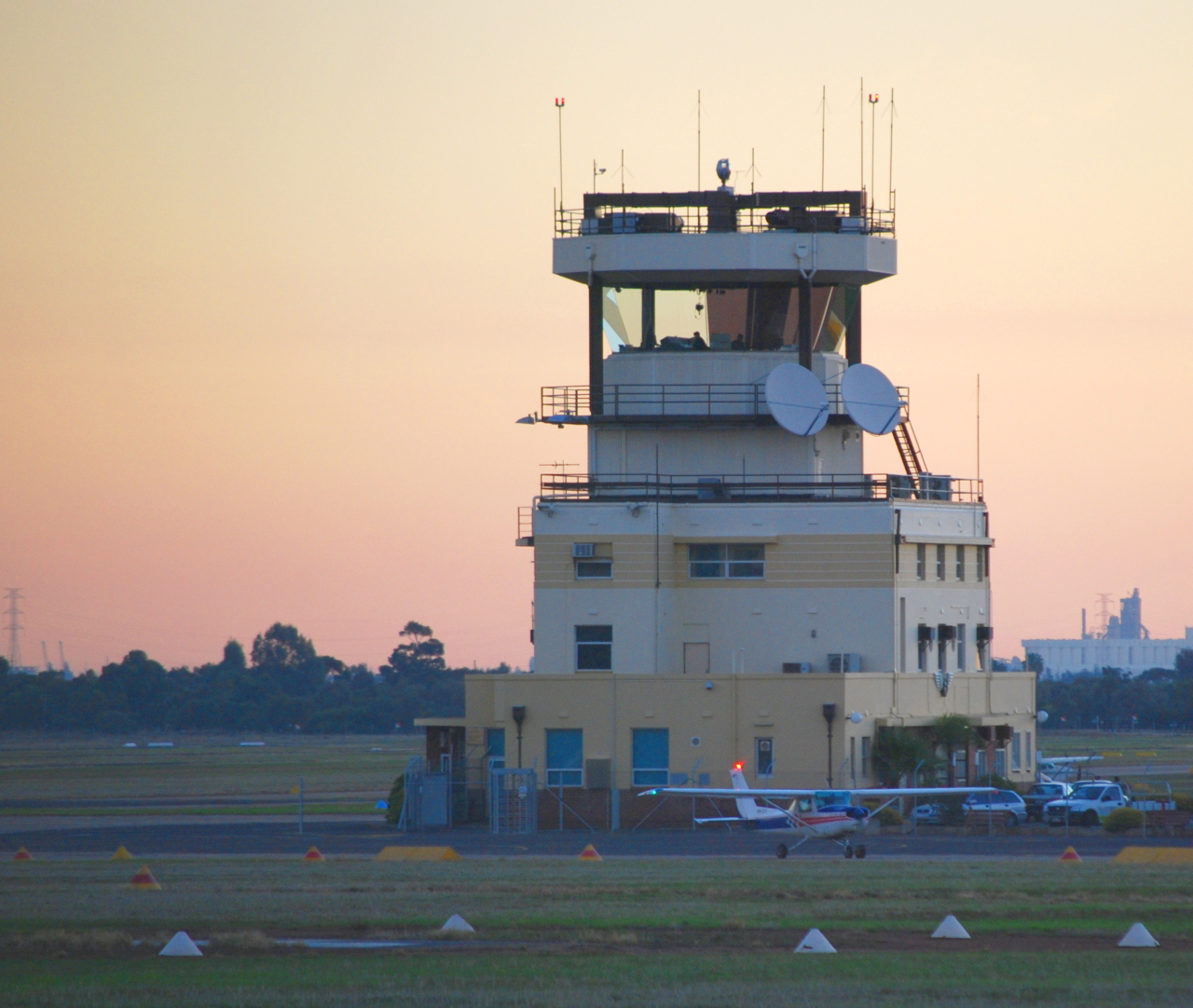

- Location within South Australia
- 34.7908°S 138.6363°E
- Location: Kittyhawk Lane, Parafield, South Australia, Australia

Commonwealth Heritage List
- Official name: Parafield Airport Air Traffic Control Tower
- Type: Listed place (Historic)
- Designated: 22 January 2016
- Reference no.: 106120

Parafield Airport Air Traffic Control Tower is a heritage-listed Air traffic control tower at Kittyhawk Lane, Parafield, South Australia, Australia. It was added to the Australian Commonwealth Heritage List on 22 January 2016.

== History ==
The first temporary ATC tower at Parafield Airport was constructed in 1937 and was a two-storey timber framed base supporting a pyramidal roofed cabin surrounded by an external balcony. By the time of its construction Parafield was handling regular passenger services to and from Perth, Melbourne and Sydney, as well as inland centres. Designed to replace the temporary towers, the "permanent buildings" referred to in the DCA Annual Report of 1937-39 were known as "Operations and Administration" buildings. These basically integrated most terminal, administration and air traffic control functions in a single building. The buildings, accommodated air traffic control towers, facilities for passengers (restaurant, rest rooms, lounge and a roof garden), airline operators, the Department of Civil Aviation, the flight-checking department, weather bureau and airport control officials.

Between 1939 and 1941, these integrated facilities were erected at three locations across Australia, at Parafield (Adelaide), Mascot (Sydney) and Archerfield (Brisbane) airports. Constructed to essentially the same design, these were three-storey, symmetrical stepped Moderne-style buildings surmounted by vertically framed, flat-roofed control cabins. The buildings featured streamlined styling, including circular porthole windows and horizontal incisions in the render, and were notable for an emphasis on horizontality, evident in the flat roof and the cantilevered awnings at the base of the control cabin platform (airside) and the roof of the ground level entrance (on the roadside). The model, which was based on overseas examples of integrated control and administration facilities – such as Croydon and Le Bourget– was designed by Department of Civil Aviation draughtsmen in Canberra around 1936. The Operations and Administration buildings at Parafield and Mascot were completed first, while the Archerfield building was delayed due to higher than expected tender prices.

Parafield's new Operations and Administration building was located on the site of the temporary elevated tower (1937), at the corner of the Kittyhawk Lane and Anderson Drive, facing due south, with views over the apron. Communication with aircraft was via visual aids, including flags, flares and large cane balls (yellow and black) mounted on a rooftop flagstaff. The controllers were also equipped with radio facilities, to co-ordinate activities on the ground and to communicate with airfields locally and on routes between airfields. During World War II, the airport at Parafield was used by the RAAF as a Flying Training Unit, using mainly Tiger Moth aircraft, with occasional use by a heavier general service aircraft such as the Liberator Bomber. By the end of the war, however, it was evident that Parafield would be unable to accommodate the future aviation needs of Adelaide, and an alternative site for a primary airport was investigated. After the war Parafield was returned to the Department of Civil Aviation. It continued to operate as Adelaide's primary civilian airport until 1955 when it was superseded by the new Adelaide Airport at West Torrens. At this time Parafield became Adelaide's general aviation airfield, a status that it retains today. In 1981, the original control cabin on top of the Operations and Administration building was removed and replaced with a larger octagonal cabin of the type typically used at the perimeter column-type towers common in Australia from the late-1970s.

== Description ==
Parafield Airport Air Traffic Control Tower is at approximately 450 sqm, Anderson Drive, Parafield Airport, comprising the Air Traffic Control Tower and its base building located within Land Parcel F114106/A11 and centred on approximate MGA point Zone 54 283739mE 6147607 mN.

The Air Traffic Control tower (comprising a 1981 cabin on the former Operations and Administration building), is located at the corner of an L-shaped line of hangars at Parafield Airport. The cabin faces directly south, and commands views of a broad apron to the west and east. The roof of the cabin is approximately 25m above ground level.

=== Exterior ===
The Parafield Operations and Administrations building is a symmetrical stepped three-storey brick building (1939–40). It supports an octagonal air traffic control cabin raised on a single level square amenities level clad in profiled Colorbond (both added in 1981). The cabin is surrounded by a steel walkway. Original drawings have been located for the control building at Archerfield in Brisbane and Parafield appears to have been constructed on the basis of these (with only very minor variations). The buildings were designed with two distinct elevations, one facing the runways (the "aerodrome elevation", south elevation in the case of Parafield) and the other accommodating the main entry (the "road elevation", north elevation at Parafield).

The principal alteration to the Parafield building has been the removal of the original cabin and its replacement with a much larger 1980s cabin. In addition, the majority of the original steel window joinery has been replaced with later aluminium and there have been a number of accretions. The north ('road side') elevation of the three-storey base building has a stripped and relatively utilitarian appearance. The façade is rendered, other than for the face brick base of the lower section of the projecting ground floor. The upper section is relieved by rendered banding and the winged logo of the Department of Civil Aviation provides a focus over the central entry at ground floor level. Window openings at ground, first and second floor levels are generally original in their placement and form but almost all original steel multi-paned windows (multi-paned casement) have been replaced with single paned versions in aluminium. The exceptions are the vertically oriented multi-paned strip windows in the location of the stair on the eastern side of this elevation, which survive as constructed and two small circular " porthole" windows located centrally at first floor level. The original central entry opening survives to the extent of its placement form, but as for the windows, the original steel framing has been replaced by aluminium.

The south elevation of the Parafield ATC tower generally replicates the stepped form and Moderne styling of the north elevation, but is a more elaborate and resolved composition with the added interest of a central curved portico element to all three levels of the building. At ground level, this curved bay was designed to offer both views of and access to the apron. The bay was originally composed of a brick plinth, a series of brick piers with full height steel casement windows between, and a door opening in the centre, with a flat curved concrete awning above. The bay has been altered through the removal of the majority of the brick piers and the steel door and window joinery and the introduction of a new aluminium framed glazing system (windows and doors) to the full extent of the bay. The curved concrete canopy has been retained. Behind and above the canopy, the winged Department of Civil Aviation logo is prominently displayed in the centre of the parapeted wall at upper ground floor level.

At first and second floor levels the building is stepped back from the south elevation and in from the east and west sides. The ground floor projecting curved bay is also expressed in a narrower semi-circular form at both upper levels. The original ATC cabin (now demolished) continued on the same semi-circular alignment at roof level and was separated from the levels below it by narrow projecting semi-circular platform with steel balustrading. The base of the platform is continued across the façade as a finely detailed concrete window hood. The cabin itself has been demolished other than for a semi-circular remnant at the base, but the window hood and platform with its steel balustrading survive. As for the north elevation, window and door frames on the south elevation are non-original aluminium, and air conditioning units have been mounted in several of the windows. The original square clock mounted on the curved bay between the second and third storeys has been removed. The side (east and west) elevations, have painted render to the upper levels and exposed red brick at the base of the ground floor. The escape stair to the west elevation is a modern steel replacement for the original timber staircase. As noted, in 1981 the original cabin was removed and replaced by a new octagonal cabin and new amenities level, square in plan, both constructed on the flat roof of the three level building. Both are constructed in steel and are clad in Colorbond. A steel walkway extends around the base of the cabin. The canted windows of the cabin are non-structural and sealed only with silicone. Four external columns support the roof at the centre of four of its eight sides. The railings to the roof are steel tubing and the cabin roof soffit is canted. There is ductwork and plant on the cabin roof, in addition to the usual crown of antennae and lightning conductors. Around the base of the cabin the roof of the building is flat and is clad in what appears to be the original bituminous membrane material.

=== Interior ===
The internal planning and fabric of the ground floor have both been extensively modified. As built, the entrance led to an east–west concourse, with a large waiting hall divided from the concourse by timber-framed glass screens marked with the DCA logo between six rendered brick piers. A small curved kiosk was at the west of the concourse. A buffet was located to the west of the waiting hall. The kiosk and buffet were accessible from the kitchen and servery in the north-east of the floor plan. Along the north side of the building, either side of the entrance, were offices, with toilets at each end and the staircase to the east of the entrance. The baggage handling room and mail office were located in the south-east corner. The former concourse has been subdivided to the east and west, and the timber-framed glass screens to the former waiting hall replaced with plaster partitions. The Flight Training Centre Adelaide occupies the former waiting hall, which has been subdivided into meeting rooms and offices. Finishes are generally modern, including carpet and tiles to the concrete floor, and partition walls of plaster and glass. Some skirting boards and a frosted circular electric light above the doorway to the apron are original. The kitchen and wet areas to the west of the ground floor retain their original use, with modifications to the fabric and a small single-storey extension to the former servery in the north-east. The original curved kiosk and buffet have been removed.

The reinforced concrete staircase retains its Moderne character, with a double-thickness central wall capped with stained timber, above which is the timber handrail raised on painted steel hoops. The treads are finished in modern (possibly 1970s) vinyl. The first floor is largely intact to its original layout. A central corridor provides access to four office spaces along the south. With the exception of some door furniture, fittings and finishes throughout are modern. The area to the north of the passage was originally a private area for use by pilots, including two bedrooms, a toilet, bathroom and dining room. The configuration of this private area has not changed, including built-in storage. At the east and west ends of the central corridor are fire doors, giving access to the external terrace to the east, west and south of the building. Electrical fittings, and wiring etc., have generally been mounted to the hard plaster walls in preference to making penetrations.

The second floor has been significantly altered. It was originally divided into a Radio Office and Radio Room to the west and a Meteorological Office and Meteorological Room to the east either side of the Flight Checking office. Access to the control cabin was via a staircase to the east of the Flight Checking office. As existing, the second floor comprises a central corridor with a large equipment room to the north, and a stand-down room, tower manager's office (within the curved bay) and Airservices office space along the south. A steel-framed staircase with concrete treads has been introduced to the west of the tower manager's office, giving access to the two-storey addition on the roof (1981). The first storey of the addition comprises a recorder room and toilets on either side of a corridor which gives access (to the east) to the cantilevered walkway around the cabin. At the other end of the corridor, a short staircase provides access to the octagonal cabin.

The interior of the 1981 cabin includes a central fixed console (timber) and the standard range of noise abatement features (carpet to walls and floor, and perforated boards to the ceiling). There is a small kitchen area at the bottom of the short flight of stairs to the cabin. There appear to have been no significant modifications to the cabin interior since construction in 1981.

=== Integrity ===
Externally, the principal alteration to this building has been the removal of the original cabin and its replacement in 1981 with a new cabin of considerably greater scale and quite different form. The original cabin was an integral part of the design of the building as a whole, with the treatment of the airside (south) façade reflecting the centrality of this element.

Notwithstanding the impact of this change, the three-storey base building remains legible as a Moderne building with "streamlined" styling including circular windows and horizontal banding. The external fabric survives relatively intact, with minimal modifications to the building in terms of additions and new openings, but with the replacement of most original steel window and door frames with aluminium. Internally, there have been extensive modifications to the original fabric and arrangement. These are most evident on the ground and second floors, while the first floor level is more intact. The control tower cabin and its square single-storey base are essentially unaltered since construction in 1981.

== Heritage listing ==
Parafield Airport Air Traffic Control Tower was listed on the Australian Commonwealth Heritage List on 22 January 2016 having satisfied the following criteria.

Criterion A: Processes

The Parafield Air Traffic Control tower has a strong historical association with a key phase in the development of air traffic control services in Australia, being one of three almost identical integrated Operations and Administration buildings constructed at major airports in Australian capital cities between 1939 and 1941 (the others were at Mascot (Sydney) and Archerfield (Brisbane)).

The Parafield example is distinguished from those at Archerfield and Mascot in that it retains its original function, albeit with a 1981 cabin. It is likely that the building has been associated with the provision of air traffic control for longer than any other surviving building in Australia.

Criterion B: Rarity

Accepting the loss of the original Air Traffic Control cabin, the Parafield ATC tower stands as a rare surviving example of an early (pre-WWII) air traffic control facility, in this case integrated into a larger terminal and operations building.

Three examples of this integrated model were built prior to the outbreak of World War II. While all three survive in various states of intactness, all are considered rare in a national context, both in terms of early air traffic control facilities and, more broadly, early aviation facilities.

Criterion D: Characteristic values

It is a representative example of a control tower typology considered important in the history of the building type.
