= Parafield, South Australia =

Parafield
- Suburb
- Interactive map of Parafield
- Coordinates: 34°47′24″S 138°38′24″E
- Country: Australia
- State: South Australia
- City: Adelaide
- LGA: City of Salisbury
- Location: 18 km (11 mi) N of Adelaide city centre

Government
  - State electorate: Playford
  - Federal division: Makin

Population
  - Total: 21 (SAL 2021)
- Postcode: 5106
Suburbs around Parafield
Salisbury Downs	Salisbury South	Salisbury East
Parafield Gardens	Parafield	Para Hills West
Mawson Lakes	Pooraka

Parafield (pronounced /ˈpærə-/) is a non-residential suburb of Adelaide approximately 15 to 18 kilometres (9 to 11 mi) north of the CBD. The suburb is essentially contiguous with Parafield Airport. There are airport related businesses in the terminal and hangar area of the airport, and a general commercial area in the corner of Kings and Main North Roads.

It is bordered by Main North Road to the east, Kings Road to the north and the Gawler railway line to the west, where it is served by Parafield station. To the south it abuts Mawson Lakes and Elder Smith Drive at the boundary of the airport.

Parafield Post Office opened on 1 July 1946, was renamed Parafield Airport in 1965 and closed in 1986.

== Climate ==
Climate data for Parafield (Parafield Airport), elevation 10 m (33 ft), (1991–2020 normals, extremes 1939–present)
Month	Jan	Feb	Mar	Apr	May	Jun	Jul	Aug	Sep	Oct	Nov	Dec	Year
Record high °C (°F)	47.7 (117.9)	44.7 (112.5)	42.7 (108.9)	38.2 (100.8)	31.1 (88.0)	26.3 (79.3)	26.5 (79.7)	30.4 (86.7)	35.0 (95.0)	39.2 (102.6)	44.3 (111.7)	46.7 (116.1)	47.7 (117.9)
Mean daily maximum °C (°F)	30.9 (87.6)	30.6 (87.1)	27.4 (81.3)	23.7 (74.7)	19.3 (66.7)	16.2 (61.2)	15.6 (60.1)	16.7 (62.1)	19.6 (67.3)	23.2 (73.8)	26.6 (79.9)	28.6 (83.5)	23.2 (73.8)
Mean daily minimum °C (°F)	16.7 (62.1)	16.7 (62.1)	14.3 (57.7)	11.5 (52.7)	9.0 (48.2)	6.8 (44.2)	6.2 (43.2)	6.4 (43.5)	8.2 (46.8)	10.3 (50.5)	13.1 (55.6)	14.9 (58.8)	11.2 (52.2)
Record low °C (°F)	7.6 (45.7)	5.0 (41.0)	5.9 (42.6)	0.6 (33.1)	−1.4 (29.5)	−2.4 (27.7)	−2.8 (27.0)	−2.0 (28.4)	−0.2 (31.6)	1.4 (34.5)	2.5 (36.5)	5.6 (42.1)	−2.8 (27.0)
Average precipitation mm (inches)	19.7 (0.78)	18.4 (0.72)	22.4 (0.88)	33.2 (1.31)	46.9 (1.85)	54.2 (2.13)	55.6 (2.19)	50.7 (2.00)	46.6 (1.83)	31.8 (1.25)	23.0 (0.91)	22.6 (0.89)	426.9 (16.81)
Average precipitation days (≥ 0.2 mm)	4.3	3.5	5.3	7.9	11.5	12.9	15.4	14.6	12.8	8.5	6.9	5.8	109.4
Average afternoon relative humidity (%)	34	35	38	44	56	66	65	61	57	46	40	38	48
Source: Australian Bureau of Meteorology (humidity 1992–2010)

== See also ==
- List of Adelaide suburbs
