= Salisbury South, South Australia =

Salisbury South
- Suburb
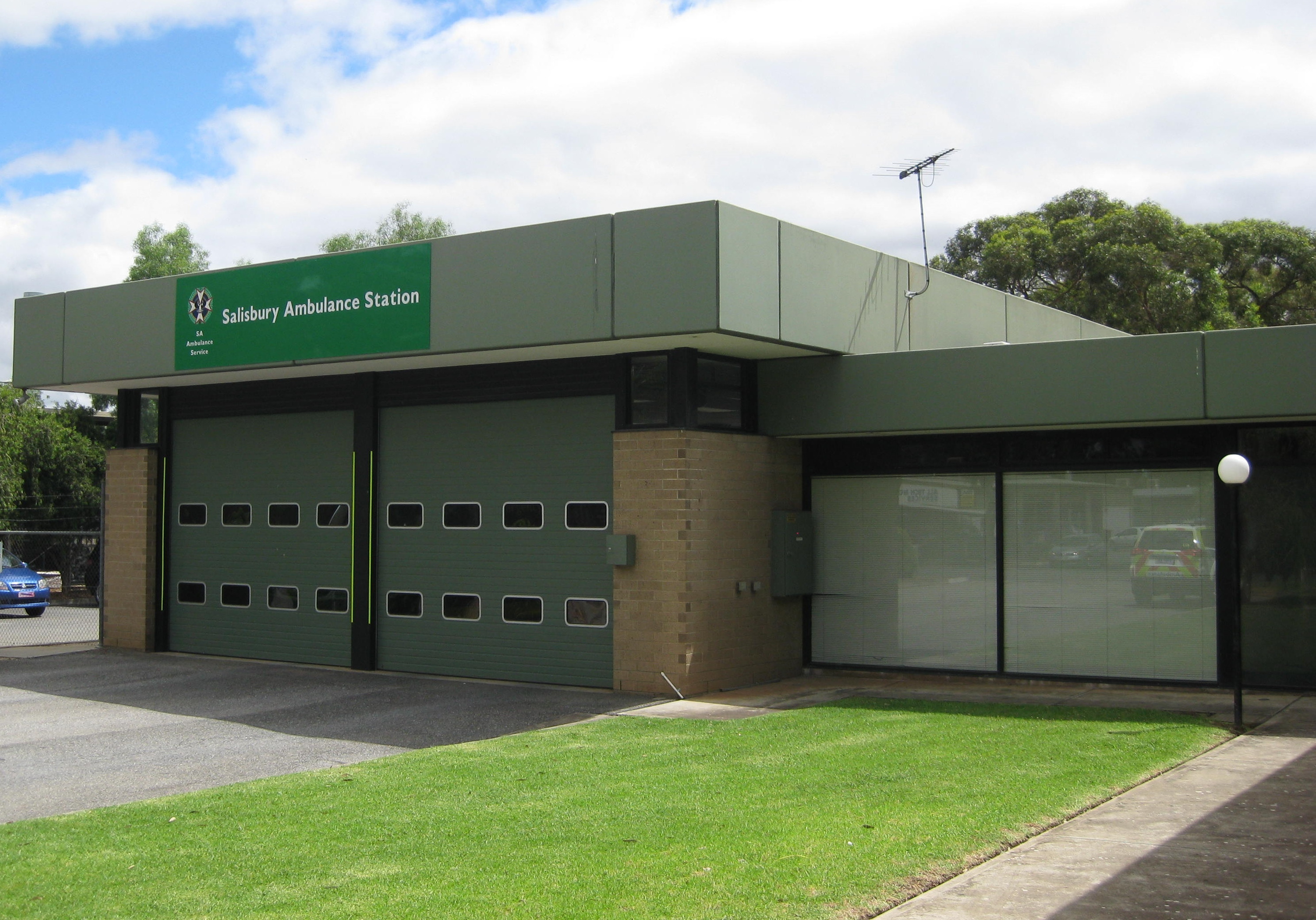
- Salisbury ambulance station, Bremen Drive

- Country: Australia
- State: South Australia
- City: Adelaide
- LGA: City of Salisbury

Government
  - State electorate: Ramsay
  - Federal division: Spence

Population
  - Total: 78 (SAL 2021)
- Postcode: 5106
Suburbs around Salisbury South
Salisbury Downs	Salisbury	Brahma Lodge
Parafield Gardens	Salisbury South	Salisbury East
Parafield	Para Hills West	Salisbury East

Salisbury South is a suburb located in the City of Salisbury, Adelaide, South Australia. It is bounded by Frost Road, Main North Road, Kings Road and Cross Keys Road. It is predominantly industrial in character and includes factories for brandnames such as Bickford's and R. M. Williams.
