= Brahma Lodge, South Australia =

Brahma Lodge
- Suburb
- Coordinates: 34°46′33″S 138°39′11″E
- Country: Australia
- State: South Australia
- City: Adelaide
- LGA: City of Salisbury

Government
  - State electorate: Ramsay
  - Federal division: Spence

Population
  - Total: 3,380 (SAL 2021)
- Postcode: 5109
Suburbs around Brahma Lodge
Salisbury	Salisbury	Salisbury Plain
Salisbury South	Brahma Lodge	Salisbury East
Salisbury South	Salisbury East	Salisbury East

Brahma Lodge is a northern suburb of Adelaide, South Australia. It is located in the City of Salisbury.

== History ==
The land on which the current suburb lies was owned by Frank Reiss who, in 1960, became the first to sell his land for subdivision. The suburb was named for the trotting horse stud of the same name that had been located on the land. Brahma Lodge Post Office opened on 14 May 1962.

== Geography ==
The suburb lies southeast of Salisbury town centre.

== Demographics ==
The 2021 Australian Bureau of Statistics Census counted 3.380 people in Brahma Lodge on Census night - 51.4% of whom were male. The total population had increased since the 2006 Census, when the population was 2,983 (49.9% of whom were male). Although the majority of residents (59.9%) were of Australian birth in 2021, this was a lower proportion than 2006.

The age distribution of Brahma Lodge residents is similar to that of the greater Australian population. 67.6% of residents were over 25 years old in 2021, which was marginally lower than the Australian figure of 69.9%.

== Community ==
The local newspaper is the News Review Messenger. Other regional and national newspapers such as The Advertiser and The Australian are also available.

=== Schools ===
Brahma Lodge Primary School is located near the centre of the suburb.

== Attractions ==
=== Parks ===
The main greenspace in Brahma Lodge is Cockburn Green, between Hammond Avenue and Mortess Street, and Brahma Lodge Oval on Francis Road.

== Transportation ==
=== Roads ===
Brahma Lodge is serviced by Main North Road and Park Terrace, the latter linking the suburb to Salisbury town centre.

=== Public transport ===
Brahma Lodge is serviced by buses run by the Adelaide Metro.

== See also ==
- List of Adelaide suburbs
