= Salisbury Heights, South Australia =

Salisbury Heights
- Suburb
- Coordinates: 34°45′47″S 138°41′19″E
- Country: Australia
- State: South Australia
- City: Adelaide
- LGA: City of Salisbury
- Location: 21.1 km (13.1 mi) from Adelaide

Government
  - State electorate: King
  - Federal division: Makin

Population
  - Total: 4,488 (SAL 2021)
- Postcode: 5109
Suburbs around Salisbury Heights
| Salisbury Park | Hillbank | Gould Creek |
| Salisbury Plain | Salisbury Heights | Greenwith |
| Salisbury East | Gulfview Heights | Golden Grove |

Salisbury Heights is a suburb located in the City of Salisbury, Adelaide, South Australia. The upper section of Salisbury Heights was originally established as Castleau Estate in the 1970s by a private consortium. The blocks of land in this area were typically much larger than surrounding suburbs with half acre blocks compared to the usual quarter acre block. In April 2017, the Salisbury Heights section of Tea Tree Gully Council was renamed and amalgamated with nearby Greenwith.
