= Salisbury Park, South Australia =

Salisbury Park
- Suburb
- Coordinates: 34°45′31″S 138°40′04″E
- Country: Australia
- State: South Australia
- City: Adelaide
- LGA: City of Salisbury

Government
  - State electorate: King
  - Federal division: Spence

Population
  - Total: 2,276 (SAL 2021)
- Postcode: 5109
Suburbs around Salisbury Park
Elizabeth Vale	Elizabeth Vale	Hillbank
Salisbury	Salisbury Park	Salisbury Heights
Salisbury Plain	Salisbury East	Salisbury Heights

Salisbury Park is a northern suburb of Adelaide, located in the City of Salisbury, South Australia. It is on the south bank of the Little Para River, bounded by Main North Road and Saints Road.
