= Edward J. Pitts =

Artist and pastoralist in South Australia

Edward John Pitts (1 October 1832 – 30 December 1885) was an artist and pastoralist in the early days of South Australia, noted for founding The Levels as a sheep breeding establishment.

== History ==
He was born in the North-West Provinces of India; his father was a colonel in the Indian Army, and a friend of Lord Raglan. Edward was educated for the army, receiving instruction at Edinburgh until he was about 12 years of age, and subsequently in France. Impatient of advancement, he decided to try his fortune in the young colony of South Australia, arriving at the end of 1852. His first appointment was as assistant to the Colonial Architect on 19 February 1853. On 1 July he was promoted to second assistant in the Land Office. He enjoyed some success, being one of the best draftsmen in the colony and an artist of great skill. He designed some of the handsome medals the Agricultural and Horticultural Society awarded at its earlier Shows.

After leaving the Government service he went to C. B. Fisher's Thurk Station, on the River Murray. (C. B. Fisher was a son of James Hurtle Fisher) After a comparatively short time, he joined the Melbourne stock and station agents, Powers, Rutherford, & Co., as salesman. After serving some years in that position he moved to Queensland as manager of one of Fisher's stations, then was made general manager of his South Australian stations, among them the Bundaleer and Hill River stations. The stock he raised was of the best quality, and the wool and sheep were famous all over Australia.

When, in 1876, Fisher sold these properties, he started sheep breeding himself. He chose for his farm The Levels, at Dry Creek. The country was considered very poor, and many freely expressed the belief that Pitt's attempt would result in failure. But with characteristic energy, and the knowledge he had accumulated, he brought The Levels to be one of the richest and best regulated sheep breeding establishments in Australia. His wool was well known all over the world, and always commanded premium prices, while his sheep were acknowledged to be second to none. He also bred trotting horses, which were for many years unequalled in the colony.

Pitts never took any prominent part in politics or public matters, but for about twenty years he was an active and prominent member of the Royal Agricultural and Horticultural Society of South Australia. He accompanied J. H. Symon, Q.C., M.P. on a tour of Continental Europe; despite his absence from France for about twenty eight years, he was still able to converse fluently in both French and German.

== Recognition ==
Pitts took the highest prize for wool at the first competition at Goldsbroughs' warehouses in Melbourne. He was also awarded a gold medal for fleeces at the London Exhibition, while at Paris and Vienna he was equally successful in receiving medals for his wool.

== Family ==
Pitts never married, and had no relatives in Australia, but had two sisters, one of whom was married to General Ray, of Woolwich, and the other to Major Bannister, a distinguished cavalry officer. Pitts was buried at the North Road Cemetery on 31 December 1885. His home, "The Levels", contained numerous examples of his artistic abilities, presumably now lost.
