= Cobbler Creek Recreation Park =

Protected area in South Australia

- IUCN category III (natural monument or feature)
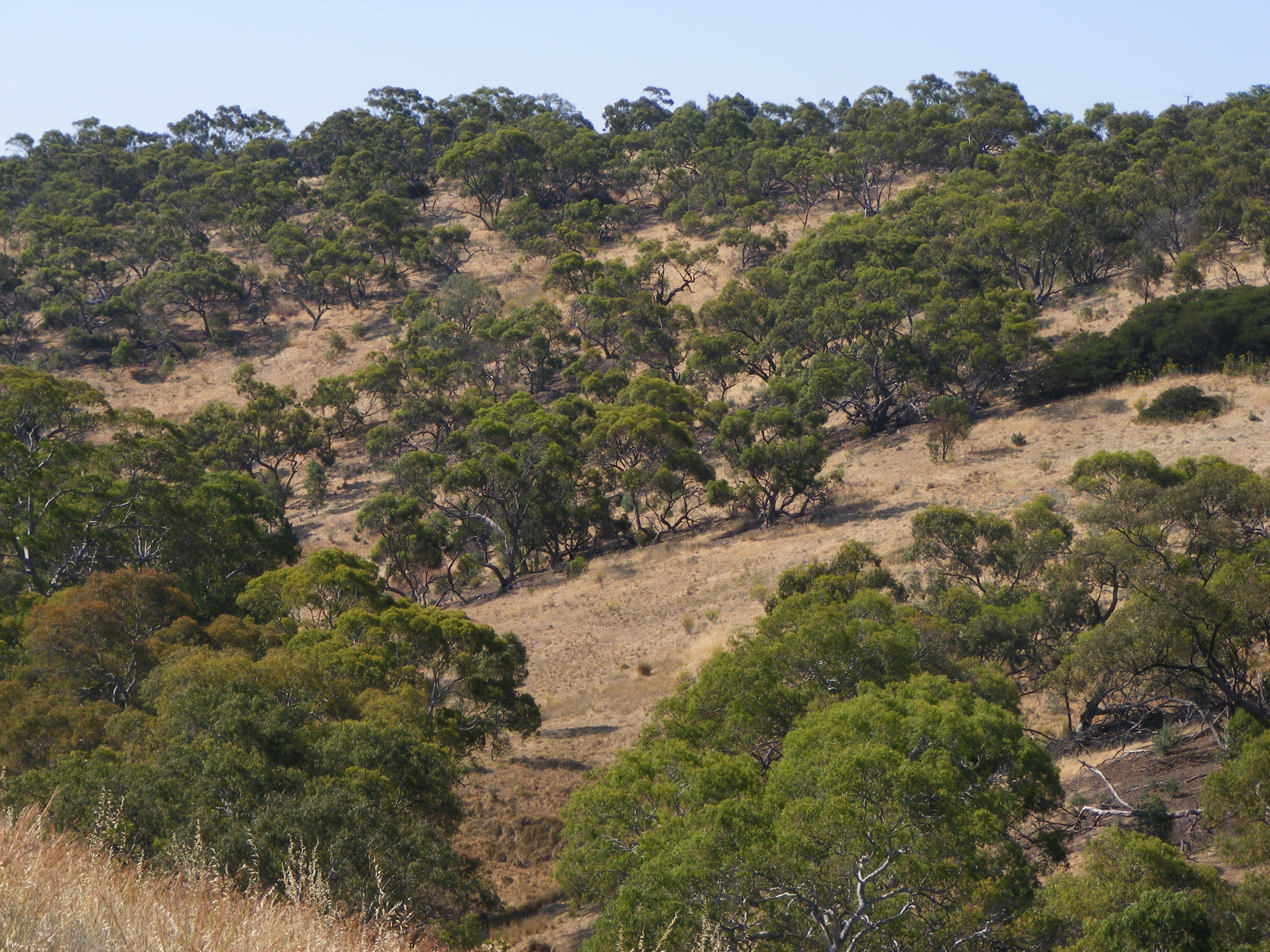
- Cobbler Creek Recreation Park

- Location within South Australia
- Location: South Australia, Salisbury East
- Coordinates: 34°46′46.56″S 138°41′27.23″E
- Area: 2.66 km^{2} (1.03 sq mi)
- Established: 26 October 1989
- Governing body: Department for Environment and Water
- Website: http://www.environment.sa.gov.au/parks/Find_a_Park/Browse_by_region/Adelaide/Cobbler_Creek_Recreation_Park

Cobbler Creek Recreation Park is a 266-hectare (657-acre) protected area located in South Australia about 19 kilometres (12 mi) north of the Adelaide city centre in the suburb of Salisbury East. Originally part of the lands of the Kaurna aboriginal people, it was farmed from European settlement of South Australia until the declaration of the park in 1989.

The park provides an open space barrier between Golden Grove and the suburbs of Salisbury, has dams to mitigate flooding and is a significant site for both public recreation and native flora and fauna conservation. It is bounded by main roads and bisected by a four-lane main connecting road.

== Structure and climate ==
Map showing structures, trails and roads

Cobbler Creek Recreation Park is a 266-hectare (657-acre) protected area located about 19 kilometres (12 mi) north of the Adelaide city centre within the suburb of Salisbury East. The park is bounded by Bridge and Smith roads, and Green Valley Drive. The Grove Way, a major divided road, runs through the park with a pedestrian underpass connecting the two park sections. The park is open to the public and includes three formed walking trails and two ruins. The remains of William Pedler's home "Trevalsa" and another's called "Teakles House" lie next to one of the trails. There are no public facilities except for benches, signage and picnic tables. "Kelway House", originally belonging to the Kelway Park farm that occupied much of the park, remains as office accommodation for park management staff.

The park lies on the border between the dry northern Adelaide Plains and the wetter Mount Lofty Ranges. Based on climate measurements for nearby Parafield Airport, the park has an average rainfall of 465 millimetres (18 in), an average winter daily temperature range of 6.2—15.6 degrees Celsius and a summer range of 16.5—29.7. Due to the risk of flooding after heavy rain, the park's waterways have been dammed, though they are dry for much of the year. The park's topography ranges from steadily sloping in the west, to hilly in the east. Its lowest point, on the western edge along Bridge road, is 70 metres (230 ft) above sea level, rising to 215 metres (705 ft) at the Para Trigonometric Point in the park's southeastern corner. Flat land on the western side has red-brown soil with the remainder having Terra Rosas, Redzinas and fine-textured mallee soils.

Cobbler Creek itself begins in the hills to the west of Golden Grove and joins with Slate Creek prior to entering the park. It is used to collect stormwater from the Tea Tree Gully area as it passes through both farmland and suburbs. After leaving the park the creek passes through housing developments, into wetlands and eventually to the Barker Inlet.

The recreation park is classified as an IUCN Category III protected area.

== Prior use of the land ==
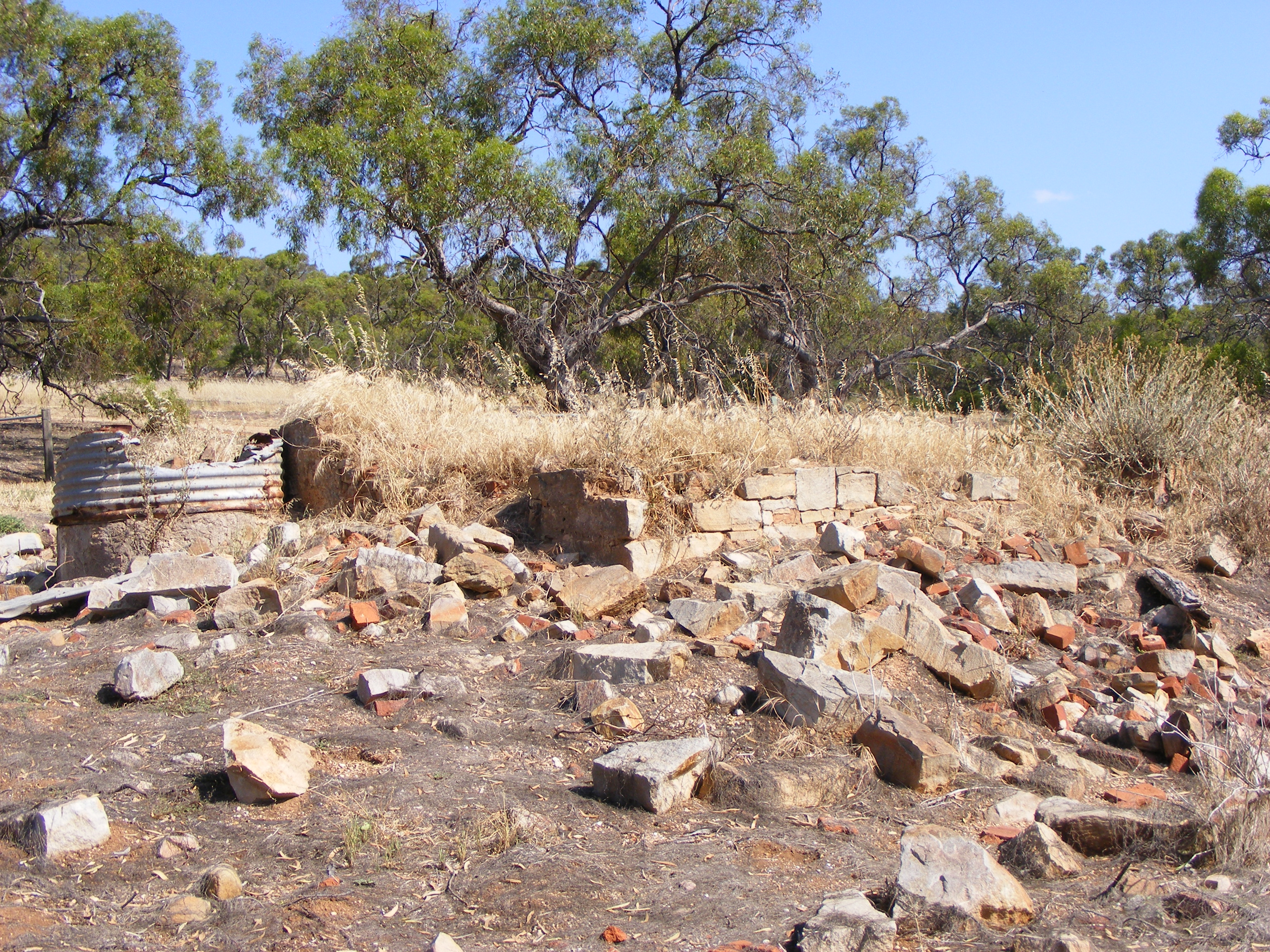
Ruin of "Trevalsa", William Pedler's home

After European settlement the land was used for farming. William Pedler III (1804–1874), emigrated to the colony from Cornwall in 1838. He was one of the first to farm the area with his wife Elizabeth (Nicholls). William had been a shoe-maker in Cornwall and Adelaide and from his farm at Salisbury made shoes and boots for teamsters passing through carting ore to Burra. William Pedler first purchased land of 66 acres (27 ha) at Cobbler Creek in 1850, later adding adjoining land to create a farm of 279 acres. He passed the property on, and his oldest son William IV farmed the land for many years with his wife Martha (Day) and their family. William III's profession gave both the creek that passes through the northern part of the park, and the park their names. Pedler's farm occupied the flatter, western area of land near Bridge Road. Part of the park was later a farm known as "Kelway Park"; a homestead of the same name remains in the park's south-west. In the 19th century, Salisbury residents used this area for Sunday school picnics. Swings were temporarily built, water and food brought to the site and games and bands provided for entertainment.

Investigations have found no evidence of land use prior to European settlement, although the park forms part of the traditional lands of the Kaurna aboriginal people. It is likely that the Kaurna used the area during winter for food and shelter, moving to the coast to escape summer heat.

== History ==
In a 1962 government report, the park's area was identified for use as future open space. A golf course was proposed, as were other sporting facilities. The course was re-proposed in 1981 and again in the 1990 management plan. The park was purchased by the Government of South Australia in 1970, as part of a program preserving open space for recreation. The park's location was chosen to provide a development-free buffer between the existing suburbs of Salisbury and the proposed Golden Grove development. It was owned and managed by the State Planning Authority until 1982 when control passed to the National Parks and Wildlife Service. Cobbler Creek was declared a recreation park in 1989, at which point some of the land remained leased for agriculture. The Golden Grove Indenture Act (1984) committed the government to build certain access roads to the new suburb of Golden Grove. Based on the provisions of section 7A-1 in the act, in June 1987 cabinet approved the building of Grove Way. The road is a 4-lane divided connecting road, begun in September 1988 and completed in 1990.

Cobbler Creek Recreation Park is administered and maintained jointly by the City of Salisbury, and the Department of Environment, Water and Natural Resources. A volunteer group, Friends of Cobbler Creek, was formed in 1990 and works with rangers to improve and maintain the park.

== Flora and fauna ==
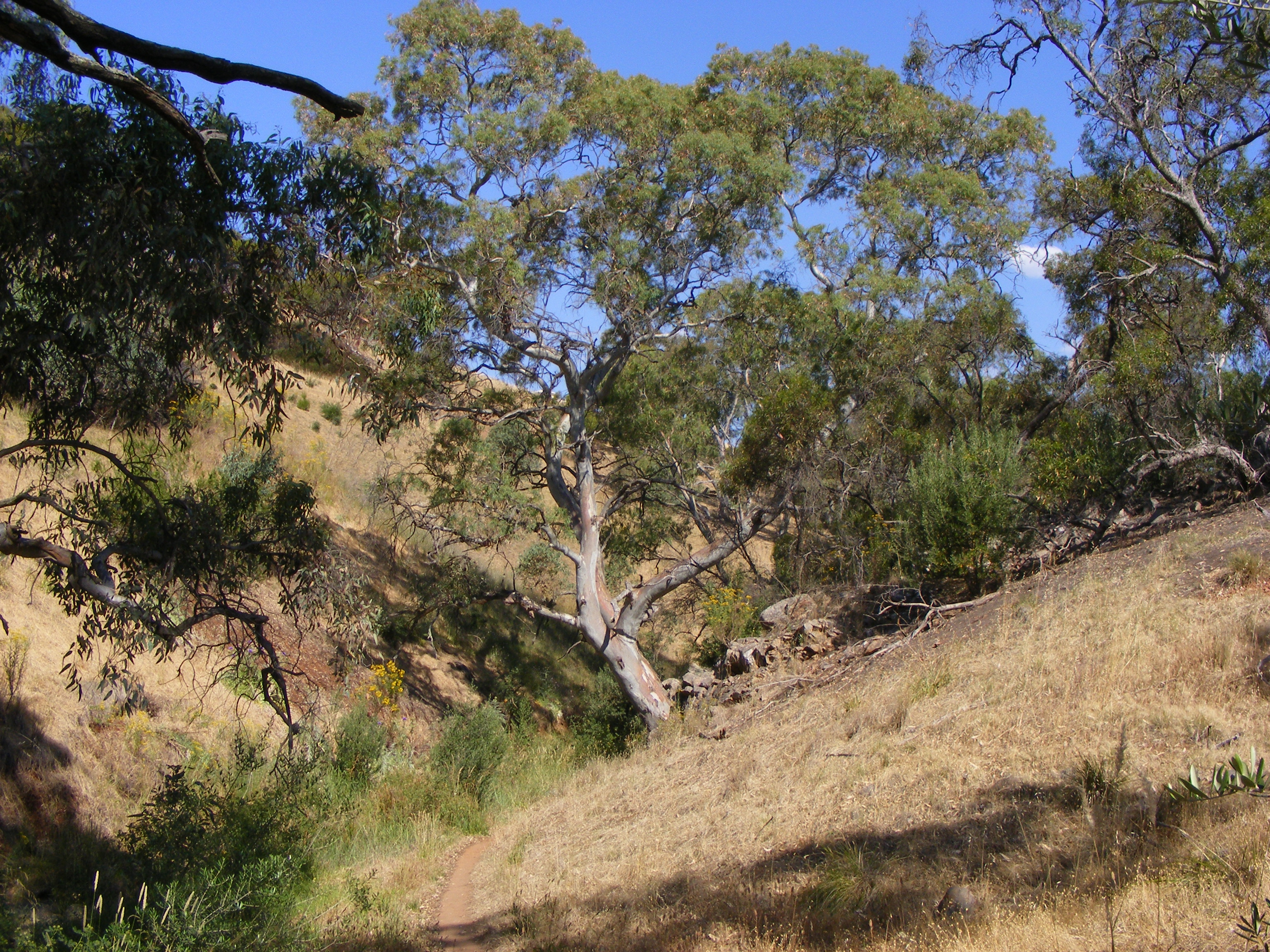
River red gum, native to the area

While sections of the park have been cleared (owing to past land uses), other areas feature grassland, river red gum (Eucalyptus camaldulensis), and mallee box (Eucalyptus porosa). The park contains some of the last remaining mallee box grassy woodland in Adelaide. Amongst the woodlands, plants like the blue-flowering flax lily are common.

Most of the lower, western parts of the park were cleared for pasture and cropping until the early 1970s. While there is remnant vegetation on higher ground, introduced pasture grasses and associated weeds dominate much of the understorey. Perennial native grasses, such as kangaroo grass (Themeda triandra), have been used as part of the park's revegetation. Many of the introduced grasses dry in summer and pose a greater fire hazard than the regrowth. To combat this hazard, and protect surrounding residential areas, annual burns are held particularly around the park's margins. These burns also serve to encourage native vegetation to dominate over introduced weeds.

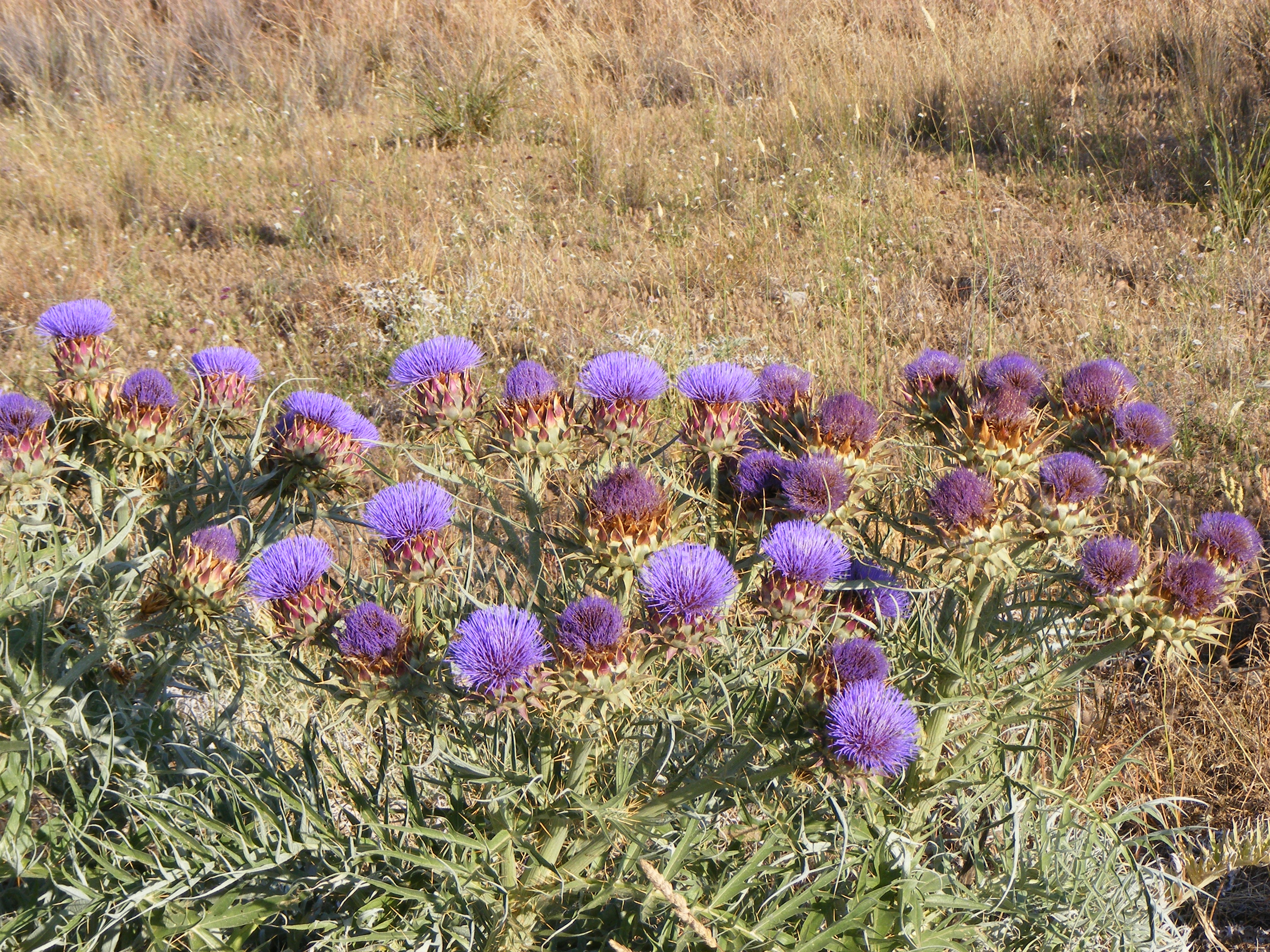
Introduced artichoke thistle in flower

Due to the park's perceived modest conservation values, the 1990 management plan called only for specific control of proscribed weeds rather than an eradication plan for all introduced species. Cobbler Creek park has a wide range of native plants including quandong, ruby saltbush (Enchylaena tomentosa), desert cassia (Cassia eremophila), weeping pittosporum and umbrella wattle (Acacia ligulata).

Native fauna species have been greatly reduced by past agricultural practices and the introduced rabbit is now common. Eastern bearded dragons, White's skink, eastern brown snake, and sleepy lizard reptile species are seen; a total of twenty species have been seen within the park. Black-shouldered kites and nankeen kestrels hunt over the grasslands. red-rumped parrots and crested pigeons are seen feeding on the ground and wattlebirds, musk lorikeets, noisy miners and honeyeaters in the flowering gums and along creeklines. The park is home to a small population of the worm-like and vulnerable Flinders Ranges worm-lizard (Aprasia pseudopulchella).

== Recreation ==
Recreational use of the park is encouraged. There are some picnic facilities provided and dogs are allowed to be walked while on leads. The park includes three named walking trails—Mai Tappa, Babbler and Porosa— that largely follow formed management tracks. The trails pass by the park's ruins and both these and natural sights are highlighted by interpretive signs.

Mountain bike riding was prohibited within the park and illegal trail bike riding was common. However, as of 2013 shared use trails have been built for walkers and mountain bike riders.

== See also ==
- List of protected areas in Adelaide
