= Mawson Lakes, South Australia =

Mawson Lakes
- Suburb
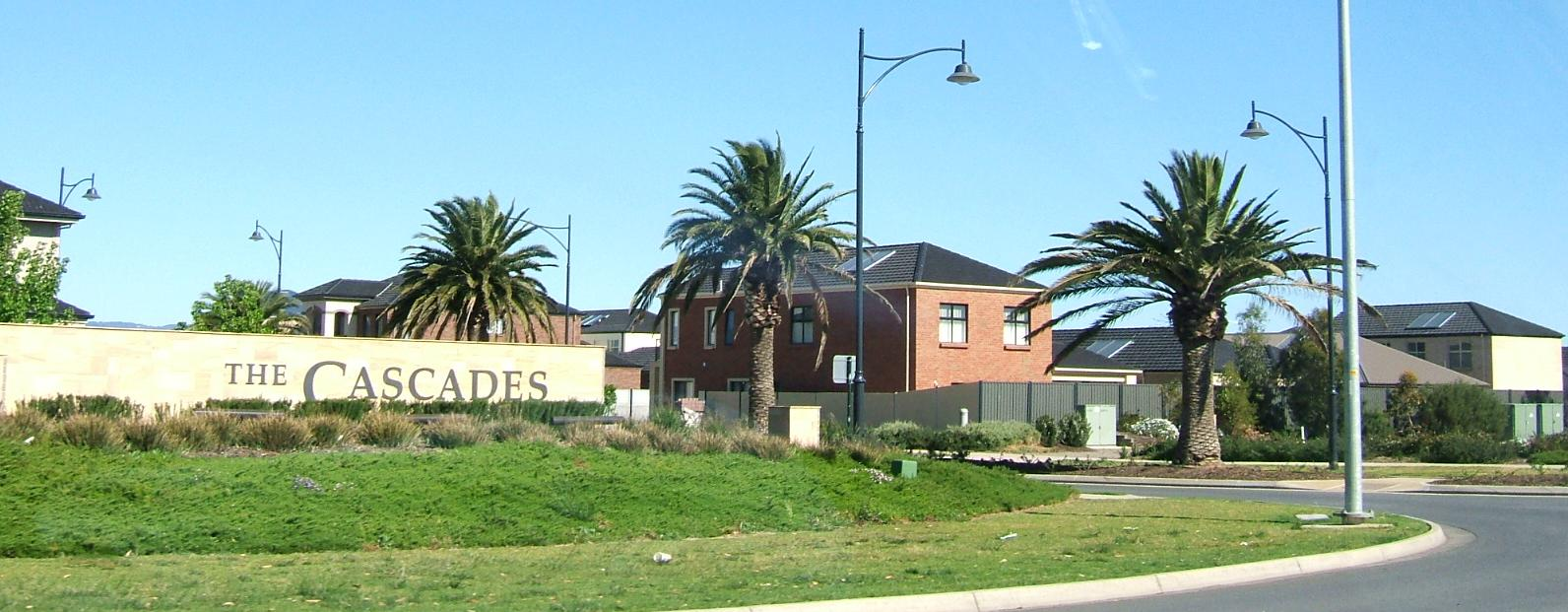
- Entrance to The Cascades residential village from Salisbury Highway, Mawson Lakes

- Country: Australia
- State: South Australia
- City: Adelaide
- LGA: City of Salisbury
- Location: 12 km (7.5 mi) from Adelaide
- Established: 1998

Government
  - State electorate: Playford
  - Federal division: Makin

Area
  - Total: 6.37 km^{2} (2.46 sq mi)

Population
  - Total: 13,794 (SAL 2021)
- Postcode: 5095
Suburbs around Mawson Lakes
Green Fields	Parafield Gardens	Para Hills West
Dry Creek	Mawson Lakes	Ingle Farm
Cavan	Pooraka	Ingle Farm

Mawson Lakes, on the site of the former sheep breeding establishment known as The Levels, is a northern residential suburb of Adelaide, Australia. It was created in the late 1990s and named in honour of Douglas Mawson, and is located approximately 12 kilometres (7.5 mi) north of the Adelaide central business district. It is also the site and name of a campus of Adelaide University (formerly University of South Australia, originally established as The Levels campus of South Australian Institute of Technology). Similar to the large tidal lake at West Lakes, Mawson Lakes features the 7-hectare (17-acre) Sir Douglas Mawson Lake, a recreation lake which is the centrepiece of the residential portion of the development — and forms part of the suburb's namesake.

== History ==
=== Pre-colonial times ===
Mawson Lakes, like the whole City of Salisbury and the Adelaide Plains, lies on the traditional lands of the Kaurna people. The Kaurna moved camps according to the seasons, which allowed the land to regenerate in their absence.

=== The Levels ===
The site of the suburb is mostly on a former sheep breeding establishment founded by artist and pastoralist Edward Pitts around 1876, known as "The Levels".

=== Technology Park Adelaide ===
Technology Park Adelaide is Australia's first science park, having been established in 1982 by the Government of South Australia. It is managed by Renewal SA. It is a 65-hectare (160-acre) site and predates the Mawson Lakes residential development.

Over 100 organisations are located at Technology Park Adelaide, with a concentrated focus on defence and aerospace, advanced electronics and information communication technologies.

Spanning from smaller enterprises through to global organisations, Technology Park Adelaide is home to organisations such as Lockheed Martin, Saab, Codan, Kongsberg Gruppen and Raytheon.

=== Suburb creation ===
The suburb of Mawson Lakes was created and named around two man-made lakes in the late 1990s, and named after geologist and Antarctic explorer Sir Douglas Mawson. One of the lakes is called the Sir Douglas Mawson Lake. In 1998, Delfin entered into a partnership with the Government of South Australia and the City of Salisbury to redevelop most of the area into a mixed-use, largely self-contained suburb featuring housing, retail, commercial and education precincts.

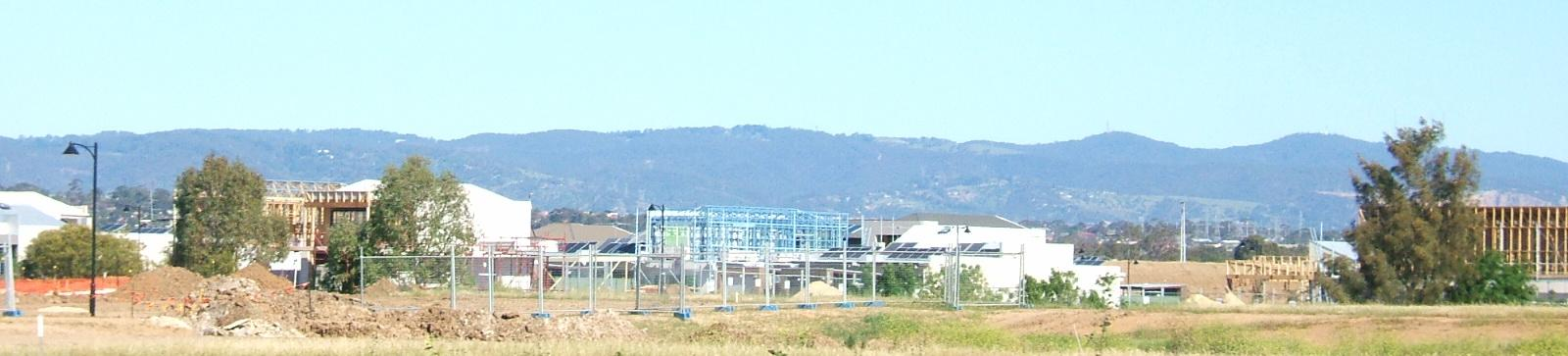
Housing construction during the initial development phase of Mawson Lakes

Housing design during the initial development phase of Mawson Lakes was controlled by land title encumbrances, with Delfin having guidelines in place to dictate acceptable architectural design and external finishes in accordance with their vision for individual neighbourhoods, as well as for the wider suburb. Encumbrances also placed restrictions on the positioning and appearance of external fixtures (such as clotheslines and TV aerials). Delfin also used encumbrances to control and influence the design and appearance of other South Australian urban developments they led, including West Lakes, Golden Grove, and later, Blakes Crossing.

In 2011, Lendlease, having acquired Delfin, completed development at Mawson Lakes and transferred management of the suburb to the City of Salisbury. The total development period was 13 years.

On 1 January 2015, the obligation on Lendlease to administer and enforce the encumbrance on properties in Mawson Lakes expired. However, the encumbrance remains in place — albeit without a nominated enforcement body.

== Housing typology and villages ==
The Mawson Lakes residential development focuses on several distinct "villages", each with their own identity and physical location within the suburb.

Most of the villages are demarcated by decorative signage at entrances off of main/feeder roads and Salisbury Highway (where applicable).

The villages are as follows:

- Mawson Central
- The Peninsula (east of Dry Creek, south of Mawson Lakes Boulevard and north of Technology Park)
- The Bridges (north of Elder Smith road and west of rail corridor
- The Cascades (north of Elder Smith Road and north east of rail corridor)
- The Sanctuary (north west of Salisbury Highway)
- Shoalhaven (north west of rail corridor)
- Parkway Village
- The Peppercorns
- Technology Park

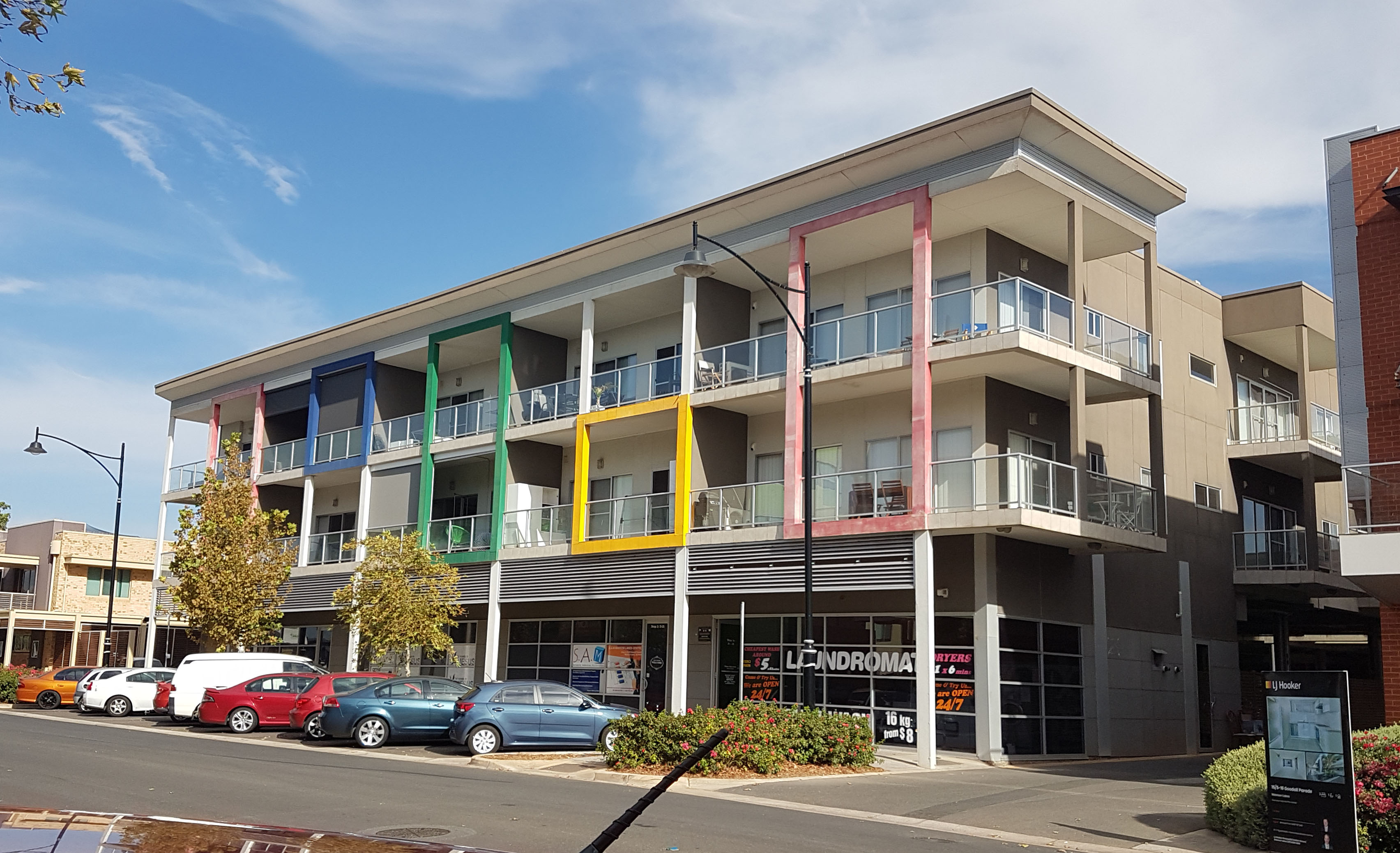
Mixed-use buildings, such as this one on Goodall Parade, are a feature of the Mawson Central business district. Apartments occupy the upper floors, with retail outlets and offices at the street level

Housing typology in Mawson Lakes is largely consistent across the suburb, consisting of contemporary and reproduction detached, semi-detached and terraced housing, although some villages contain distinct types of housing that reflect the physical attributes of the locale. Homes along the lakefront within "The Peninsula" village, for instance, are predominantly two-storey and have wider frontages to take advantage of lake views. Meanwhile, Mawson Central consists almost exclusively of apartments to reflect the denser, mid-rise character of the business district.

== Demographics ==
According to the 2021 Census, the population of the Mawson Lakes census area was 13,794 (2021 Australian census, suburb and locality, 2021). Approximately 50.7% of the population were male, with 49.3% female. 55.2% are Australian born, over 83.1% of residents are Australian citizens and only 1.1% identifying as Indigenous Australians.

Mawson Lakes has a fully educated population of around 30.6%, with that number of people holding a(n) (Advanced)Diploma or Year 12 diploma. 36% of the population do not identify with any religion, whilst 15.5% identify as Catholic.

== Facilities ==
Mawson Lakes School and Preschool are situated on the same campus on Garden Terrace.

== Transport ==
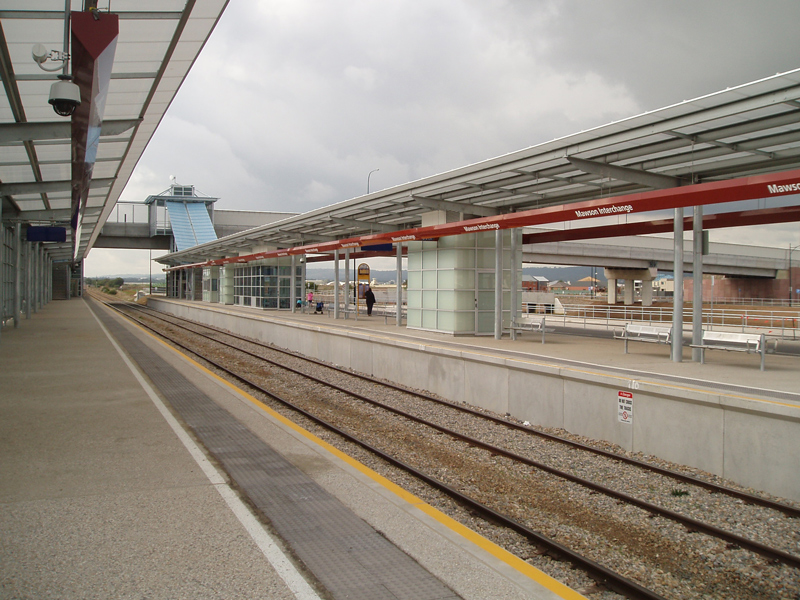
Mawson Interchange

Mawson Interchange, built in 2005, is located on the Gawler railway line. Train services are high frequency, with 15-minute intervals between services to the Adelaide CBD, and further north to Gawler. Adelaide Metro bus routes serve the interchange and connect Mawson Lakes to the Adelaide CBD as well as Salisbury, Elizabeth and Modbury.

Mawson Lakes is connected to the major Adelaide thoroughfares of Main North Road, Salisbury Highway and Port Wakefield Road. The Adelaide CBD can typically be reached by car within 30 minutes, depending on traffic conditions.

Parafield Airport, formerly Adelaide's main civil airport (from 1927 to 1955), is situated north of Mawson Lakes and is currently used for small aircraft, pilot training and recreational aviation.

== Water supply ==
Mawson Lakes features a dual water supply system, supplying drinking water and recycled water to homes via completely separate mains. When first installed, the facilities at Mawson Lakes were the largest self-contained water recycling scheme in Australia.

Lilac pipes and fittings are used to distinguish recycled water sources. The recycling scheme results in Mawson Lakes using 50% less potable water than comparable suburbs and means that resident using recycled water are exempt from state water restrictions

The recycled water is sourced from the Bolivar Wastewater Treatment Plant approximately 8 kilometres (5.0 mi) away. From there, stormwater from the Salisbury wetlands is added to the mix before it is treated up to "Class A" standard recycled water for use on public reserves, and for irrigation and toilets in each home in Mawson Lakes. The City of Salisbury conducts a cross connection audit for all residences once every five years, with a self-audit kit available from its website.

== Mawson Central ==
The central commercial area of Mawson Lakes, situated between Main Street and Garden Terrace, and north of the Promenade is the central shopping precinct with a pub, Woolworths, Aldi, and a number of smaller shops and restaurants. Main Street and its side roads are also home to bank branches, various professional services, and offices. In recent years, many offices have been converted into apartments due its close proximity to the university, direct transport links to the Adelaide CBD, and a generally higher demand for residential, rather than office, space in the region.

== Politics ==
2016 federal election
Labor	41.84%
Liberal	28.54%
Xenophon	16.60%
Greens	4.65%
Family First	4.54%
Independent	2.26%
Animal Justice	1.57%

2014 state election
Labor	51.8%
Liberal	32.3%
Greens	8.0%
Family First	7.9%

Mawson Lakes is a part of the federal division of Makin, which has been represented by Labor MP Tony Zappia since 2007, and was a part of the state electoral district of Port Adelaide, which has been represented by State Labor MP and Minister for Education and Child Development and Minister for Higher Education and Skills Susan Close since 2012.

Results shown here are from the most recent federal and state elections. Mawson Lakes was part of the state electoral district of Port Adelaide, which is said to be a 'working class' seat and therefore safe-Labor. It was shifted by the Electoral Districts Boundaries Commission into neighbouring electoral district of Playford for the upcoming 2018 state election, which is also a safe Labor seat.

== Sport and recreation ==
Mawson Lakes is home to the following sport and recreation clubs:

- Mawson Lakes Football Club
- Mawson Lakes Cricket Club (initially formed in 1952)
- Mawson Lakes Golf Club
- Mawson Lakes Model Yacht Club
- Mawson Boat Club, a rowing club that takes advantage of the 450-metre (1,480 ft) rowing course on Sir Douglas Mawson Lake.
