= Rhiannon Pearce =

Australian politician

The Honourable Rhiannon Pearce MP
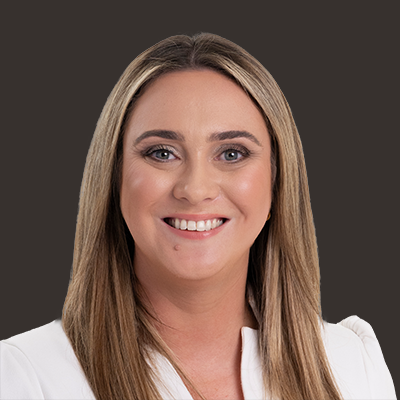

Minister for Emergency Services
- Incumbent
- Assumed office 25 March 2026
- Premier: Peter Malinauskas
- Preceded by: Herself (as Minister for Emergency Services and Correctional Services)

Minister for Local Government
- Incumbent
- Assumed office 25 March 2026
- Premier: Peter Malinauskas
- Preceded by: Joe Szakacs

Minister for Recreation, Sport and Racing
- Incumbent
- Assumed office 18 September 2025
- Premier: Peter Malinauskas
- Preceded by: Emily Bourke

Minister for Emergency Services and Correctional Services
- In office 18 September 2025 – 25 March 2026
- Premier: Peter Malinauskas
- Preceded by: Emily Bourke
- Succeeded by: Herself (as Minister for Emergency Services); Michael Brown (as Minister for Corrective Services)

Parliamentary Secretary to the Deputy Premier
- In office 24 March 2022 – 19 September 2025
- Premier: Peter Malinauskas
- Preceded by: Position created

Member of the South Australian House of Assembly for King
- Incumbent
- Assumed office 19 March 2022
- Preceded by: Paula Luethen
- Majority: 52.9 per cent

Personal details
- Party: Labor
- Spouse: Todd
- Children: 2
- Education: Bachelor of Education
- Alma mater: University of Adelaide
- Committees: Occupational Safety, Rehabilitation and Compensation; Public Works
- Website: rhiannonpearce.com.au

Rhiannon Kate Pearce is an Australian politician. She has been a Labor member of the South Australian House of Assembly since the 2022 state election, representing King. With a swing of 3.5 per cent, she defeated the incumbent Liberal Party member, Paula Luethen. In March 2022 she was appointed as Parliamentary Secretary to the Deputy Premier, Susan Close, and, in a Cabinet reshuffle on 19 September 2025, was appointed Minister for Emergency Services and Correctional Services and Minister for Recreation, Sport and Racing.

== Early life and education ==
Rhiannon Kate Pearce grew up in Telowie in the southern Flinders Ranges of the state's Mid North.

She attended Napperby Primary School and completed high school at St Mark's College in Port Pirie. Pearce then moved to Adelaide where she completed a Bachelor of Economics at the University of Adelaide.

== Career ==
Pearce then worked as a community engagement advisor for then opposition leader Peter Malinauskas.

She was the Labor Party candidate for King at the 2022 state election, when she received 52.9 per cent of the two-party-preferred vote (2PP) from 43.2 per cent of the first-preference votes, achieving a 3.5 per cent swing to the Labor Party. She defeated the incumbent Liberal Party member Paula Luethen, who had held the seat since 2018 and only enjoyed a slim margin of 0.6 per cent. Pearce was supported in her campaign by Emily's List Australia. On 24 March 2022, Pearce was appointed as Parliamentary Secretary to the Deputy Premier, Susan Close, in the new Malinauskas ministry.

From 3 May 2022 to 19 September 2025, Pearce was a member of the parliamentary committees on occupational safety, rehabilitation and compensation, and public works.

On 19 September 2025, Pearce was appointed Minister for Emergency Services and Correctional Services and Minister for Recreation, Sport and Racing in the Malinauskas ministry.

== Personal life ==
Pearce is married to Todd and has two children.

== Footnotes ==
South Australian House of Assembly
Preceded by Paula Luethen	Member for King; 2022–present	Incumbent
