= Parafield Airport =

Airport in Parafield, South Australia

Parafield Airport Adelaide–Parafield
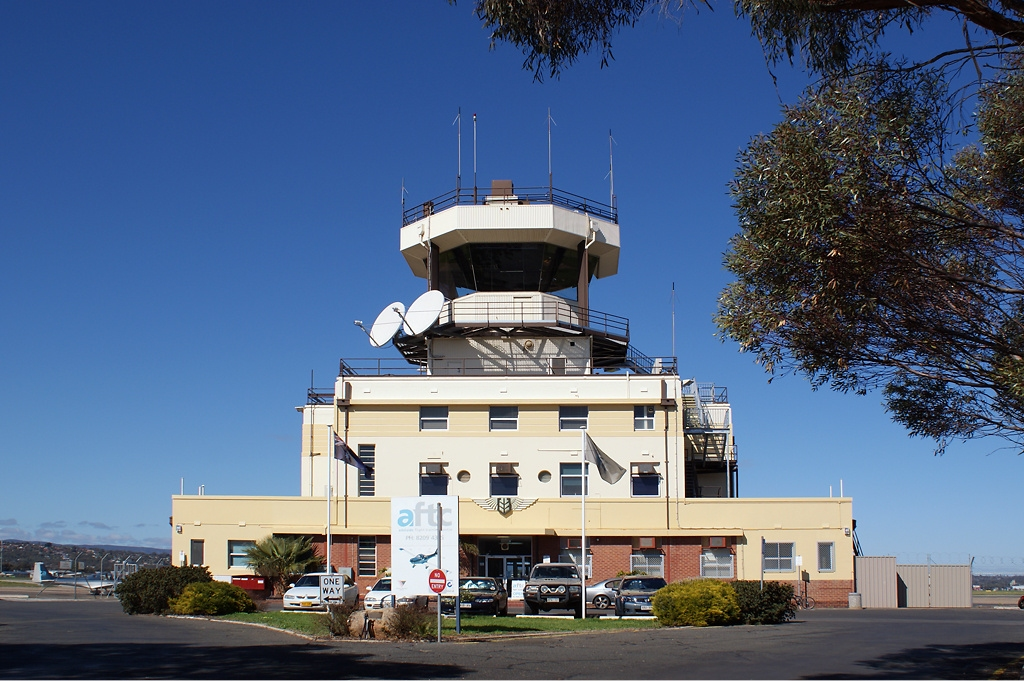
- IATA: none; ICAO: YPPF

Summary
- Airport type: Public
- Owner: Government of Australia
- Operator: Parafield Airport Limited
- Serves: Adelaide
- Location: Parafield, South Australia
- Elevation AMSL: 57 ft (17 m)
- Coordinates: 34°47′36″S 138°37′59″E
- Website: www.parafieldairport.com.au

Map
- Location in Adelaide metropolitan area

Runways
Direction	Length		Surface
Direction	m	ft	Surface
03L/21R	1,350	4,429	Asphalt
03R/21L	1,279	4,196	Asphalt
08L/26R	958	3,143	Asphalt
08R/26L	992	3,255	Asphalt

Statistics (2010/11)
- Aircraft movements: 212,862
- Sources: Australian AIP and aerodrome chart, Movements from Airservices Australia

Parafield Airport (ICAO: YPPF) is a public training airport, located on the edge of the residential suburb of Parafield, South Australia. It is 18 km (11 mi) north of the Adelaide central business district and adjacent to the Mawson Lakes campus of Adelaide University. Owned by the Government of Australia, it is leased to Parafield Airport Limited under a lease that runs until 2097.

Parafield was Adelaide's only civil airport until Adelaide Airport was opened in February 1955 and is currently used for small aircraft, pilot training and recreational aviation. The airport is home to the University of South Australia Aviation Academy. The airport hosts a jet fighter museum and historic aircraft displays. The museum now houses an authentic flight worthy Wirraway.

There are also multiple flight training schools including Adelaide University's Aviation Academy, FTA (Flight Training Adelaide) formerly known as Australian Aviation College, Adelaide Aviation, Enzo Flying School, Aerostar Aviation, and Parafield Flying Centre. Parafield Squadron of the Australian Air League, a national uniformed cadet organisation promoting and encouraging the interest of aviation and flying training in the youth of Australia, is also located at Parafield Airport.

During the 2020 financial year, Parafield Airport was Australia's busiest airport by aircraft movements, handling 272,646 aircraft movements. As of 2025, it became Australia's 5th busiest, handling 225,142 aircraft movements.

== History ==
The first powered flight in South Australia was of a Blériot Aéronautique monoplane on March 13, 1910, south-west of Salisbury in Bolivar, South Australia, the flight was nicknamed the "Wittber hop". In the 1920s investigations began into construction of an airport in Adelaide. Land was initially purchased in Albert Park with the aerodrome site becoming the new suburb of Hendon; but within a few years the cost of acquiring sufficient land, neighbouring residential development and the erection of power transmission lines all interfered with airport plans and the Hendon site was effectively abandoned. In 1927, the Commonwealth government purchased 318 acres (129 ha) of land at Parafield from a family owned farming company for £17,000. The area had been used for fattening sheep on lucerne and other fodder plants. The new airport was expanded in 1942, with the boundary extending west to the Gawler railway line.

On 1 October 1927, Horrie Miller was the first to land on the Parafield site, ground preparation was completed on the 17th and flights began on 26 November by the Aero Club of South Australia. The site was officially opened as an airport in August 1929 by Governor-General of Australia Alexander Hore-Ruthven. The control tower opened shortly prior to World War II. Prior to World War II, Guinea Airways was the main company flying out of the airport using:

- de Havilland Fox Moth – DH83
- de Havilland Dragon Rapide – DH89
- Lockheed Electra Model 10A
- Lockheed Model 14 Super Electra
- Messerschmidt Taifun
- Douglas DC-3
- Lockheed 18 Lodestar
- Ford Trimotor 5-A

During World War II, the Royal Australian Air Force (RAAF) occupied the airfield as a station for basic flight training and was home to No. 1 Elementary Flying Training School (No. 1 EFTS) between 1939 and 1944 until it moved to Tamworth, New South Wales. A relief landing ground was located near Virginia. No. 34 Squadron utilised Parafield to deliver supplies to operational bases and aerodromes in the Northern Territory and Western Australia between 1943 and February 1945.

In addition, No. 238 Squadron RAF was based at Parafield from June to December 1945, from where it flew Dakota aircraft in support of the British Pacific Fleet as part of No. 300 Group RAF.

After the war ended, transport was also handled by Australian National Airways and Trans Australia Airlines both moving to Adelaide Airport in 1955 which now handles all regular passenger transport.

In 1983 a group of trees was planted by local high school students. When fully grown, from the air they clearly spelt out the word "PARAFIELD". As of 2007 the trees had been removed. In May 1992, two reconstructed runways opened. In May 1998, it was sold by the Federal Airports Corporation along with Adelaide Airport to a consortium of Manchester Airport Group, Serco, UniSuper and Macquarie Bank Local Government Superannuation Scheme, Legal & General, John Laing, National Australia Bank and Hansen Yuncken.

On 26 June 1995, Australian aviator Jon Johanson departed from Parafield Airport in Adelaide to begin his first solo round-the-world flight, piloting a single-engine, home-built Van's Aircraft RV-4. He safely returned on 24 September, completing the worldwide circumnavigation in 198 hours of total block time.

The Parafield Airport Air Traffic Control Tower is listed on the Australian Commonwealth Heritage List.

== Classic Jets Fighter Museum ==
Parafield airport houses the Classic Jets Fighter Museum. Founded in the 1980s, the collection includes a Lockheed P-38 Lightning and a Bell P-39 Airacobra.

== Noise pollution ==
The airport has been criticised by local residents for contributing to noise pollution, particularly after the opening of a flight school and the resulting increase in planes flying traffic patterns.

== Accidents and incidents ==
- On 17 March 2013, a Supermarine Aircraft Spitfire Mk26, an 80% scale home-build replica of the Supermarine Spitfire, crashed into a fence between two businesses in a commercial area on Frost Road in the nearby suburb of Salisbury, whilst completing a routine at the airshow, killing the pilot.
- In 2018, a Cessna 172 crashed into a paddock next to Parafield Airport. The plane took off but it started to have problems immediately and the pilot caused the plane to crash. There were no deaths or injuries.
- On 5 January 2026, a Cessna 172M crashed next to runway 21L. The accident caused a small grass fire which was extingued. The sole occupant escaped the aircraft with only minor injuries.
- On 29 April 2026, two people died and several others were injured when a Diamond DA42 plane crashed into a hangar and caught fire.

== In popular culture ==
Hong Kong TVB filmed flight training scenes for their series Triumph in the Skies at the Parafield Airport.
