= Paula Luethen =

Australian politician

Member of the South Australian House of Assembly for King
- In office 17 March 2018 – 19 March 2022
- Preceded by: New seat
- Succeeded by: Rhiannon Pearce

Personal details
- Party: Liberal Party of Australia
- Education: University of South Australia
- Website: www.paulaluethen.com.au

Paula Maria Luethen is an Australian politician. She was a Liberal member of the South Australian House of Assembly from the 2018 state election, representing King, until she lost it at the 2022 state election.

Luethen was a City of Tea Tree Gully councillor before her election to state parliament.

During her maiden speech in parliament, she spoke of domestic violence and being a victim of child sexual abuse in her past.

South Australian House of Assembly
New seat	Member for King; 2018–2022	Succeeded by Rhiannon Pearce
