= Electoral district of King (South Australia) =

South Australian state electoral district

King South Australia—House of Assembly
- Interactive map of electoral district boundaries
- State: South Australia
- Created: 2016
- MP: Rhiannon Pearce
- Party: Labor
- Namesake: Len King AC QC
- Electors: 29,715 (2026)
- Area: 85.4 km^{2} (33.0 sq mi)
- Demographic: Metropolitan
- Coordinates: 34.72°S 138.74°E
Electorates around King:
Elizabeth	Schubert	Schubert
Ramsay	King	Schubert
Wright	Wright	Newland

Footnotes
- Electoral District map

King is a single-member electoral district for the South Australian House of Assembly. It was created by the redistribution conducted in 2016, and was contested for the first time at the 2018 state election. The northern part is essentially semi rural and the southern part suburban. It is on the western foothills of the Mount Lofty Ranges at the northern end of metropolitan Adelaide. King is named after Len King AC QC, a former Chief Justice of the Supreme Court of South Australia and Attorney-General of South Australia in the second Dunstan government ministry.

== History ==
The 2016 redistribution by The Electoral District Boundaries Commission considered that it had renamed the electoral district of Napier to King when it created a new marginal seat, but only 1479 of the estimated 27,002 voters in King had previously been voters in Napier from the semi rural areas of Bibaringa, One Tree Hill, Uleybury, Yattalunga. The majority of voters in King came from Wright in the suburbs of Golden Grove, Greenwith, Salisbury East and from Little Para in the suburbs of Gould Creek, Hillbank, Salisbury Heights, Salisbury Park.

The 2020 redistribution moved the northern boundary south to Uley Road which has resulted in the movement of the northern semi rural areas of Bibaringa, Uleybury and Yattalunga in the City of Playford, which were part of the former Electorate of Napier, to the large rural electorate of Schubert.

At the 2024 redistribution, King gained part of the suburb of Craigmore from Elizabeth in the North and lost part of the suburb of Salisbury East to Wright.

== Members for King ==
Member	Party	Term
Paula Luethen	Liberal	2018–2022
Rhiannon Pearce	Labor	2022–present

== Election results ==
2026 South Australian state election: King
Party	Candidate	Votes	%	±%
Labor	Rhiannon Pearce	11,106	43.0	−0.2
One Nation	David Kerrison	7,924	30.7	+30.7
Liberal	Amanda Hendry	3,101	12.0	−28.2
Greens	Samuel Moore	2,405	9.3	+3.7
Family First	Julie Glasgow	636	2.5	−1.1
United Voice	Lukas Gleeson	153	0.6	+0.6
Real Change	Adriana Haynes	191	0.7	−0.6
Australian Family	Angela Zakarias	165	0.6	−3.0
Fair Go	Tyla Finlay	120	0.5	+0.5
Total formal votes		25,801	96.3	±0.0
Informal votes		985	3.7	±0.0
Turnout		26,786	90.1	−1.6
Two-candidate-preferred result
Labor	Rhiannon Pearce	14,125	55.2	+2.3
One Nation	David Kerrison	11,459	44.8	+44.8
Labor hold				
