= Salisbury, South Australia =

Suburb of Adelaide

Salisbury
- Suburb
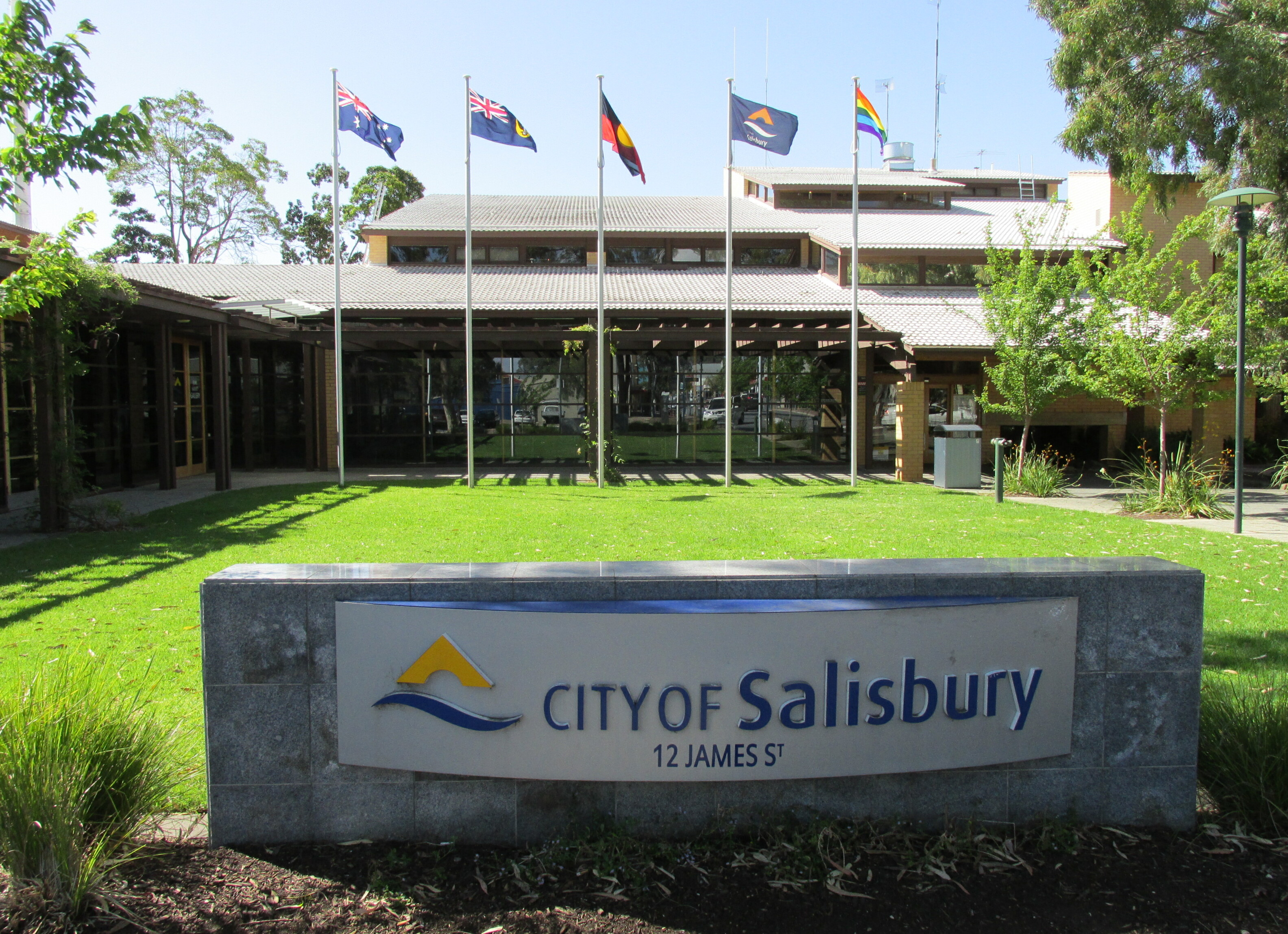
- Former City of Salisbury council chambers

- Country: Australia
- State: South Australia
- City: Adelaide
- LGA: City of Salisbury
- Location: 22 km (14 mi) from centre of Adelaide
- Established: 1843

Government
  - State electorate: Ramsay, Wright, Little Para, Taylor
  - Federal division: Spence

Area
  - Total: 4.48 km^{2} (1.73 sq mi)

Population
  - Total: 8,841 (SAL 2021)
- Postcode: 5108
Suburbs around Salisbury
Salisbury North	Elizabeth South	Salisbury Park
Paralowie	Salisbury	Salisbury Plain
Salisbury Downs	Salisbury South	Brahma Lodge

Salisbury (/ˈsɔːlzbri/ SAWLZ-br-ee) is a northern suburb of Adelaide, South Australia. It is the seat of the City of Salisbury, and is within the South Australian Legislative Assembly electoral district of Ramsay and the Australian House of Representatives division of Spence. The suburb is a service area for the City of Salisbury district, with many parklands, shops, cafés and restaurants.

== History ==
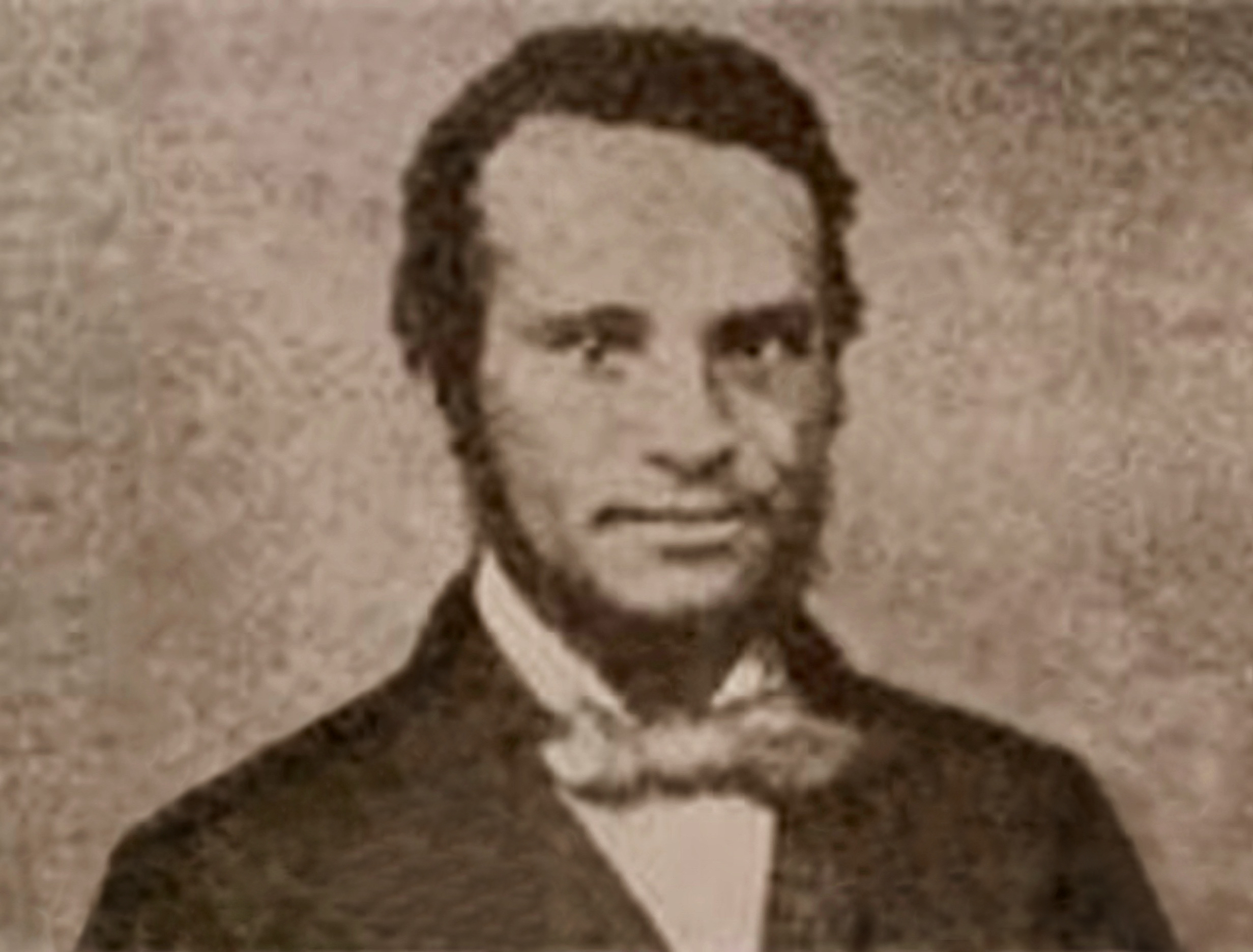
John Harvey, Salisbury's founder

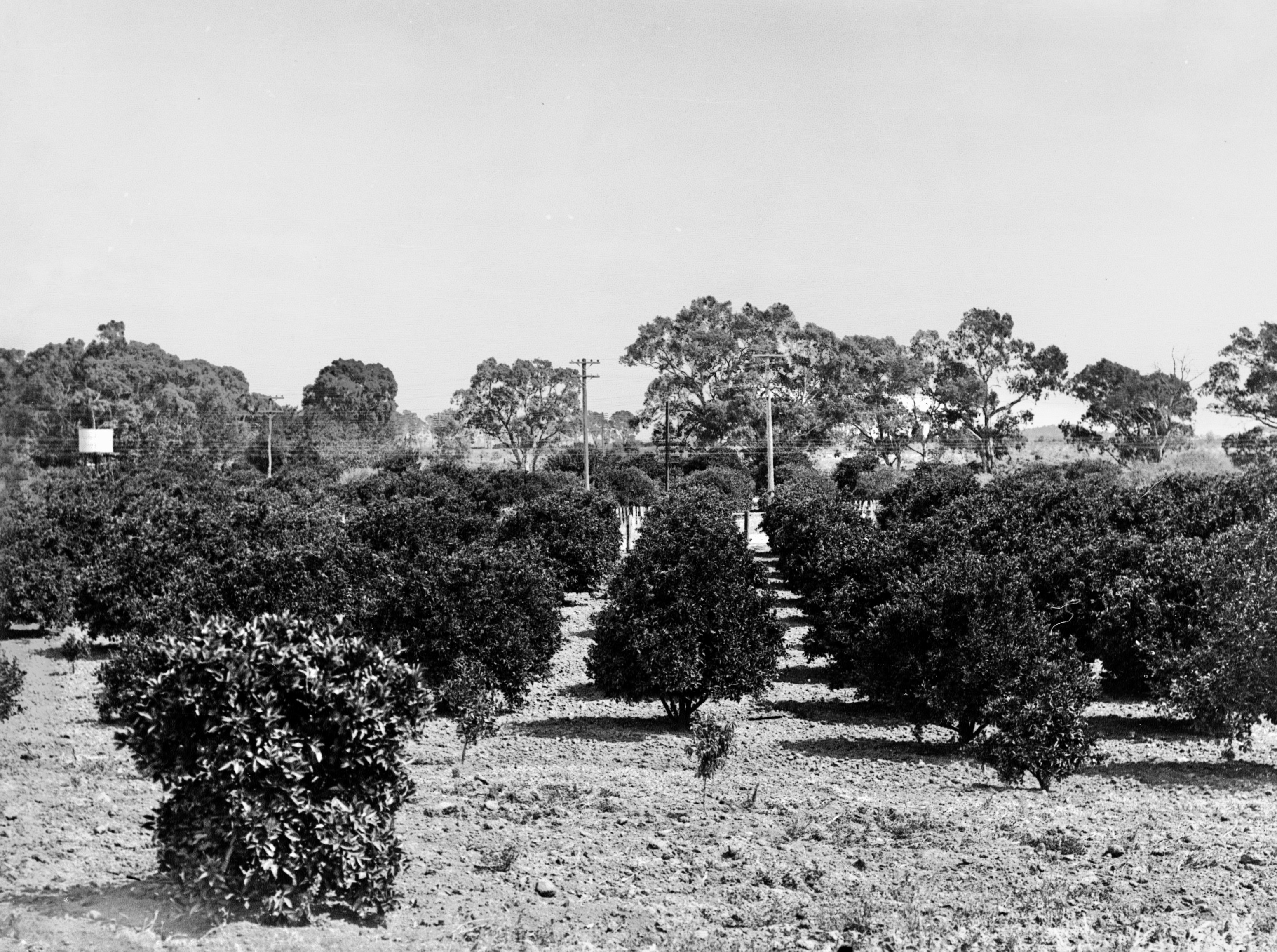
Part of a large orange orchard next to the Little Para River, ca 1925; on a property of the descendants of John Harvey, Salisbury's founder, now a public reserve

Salisbury was founded by John Harvey, who arrived in the province of South Australia from Scotland in 1839 as a young single man, three years after the establishment of government by British settlers. He began selling town allotments in 1848, from land he had purchased along the Little Para River in the previous year. He named the town after Salisbury in Wiltshire, since his new wife came from near Salisbury Plain in England. (Note: There is a Wiltshire Street in Salisbury, parallel to the main thoroughfare, John Street.) Salisbury started its life as a service centre for the surrounding wheat and hay farms. Salisbury Post Office opened around March 1850.

Salisbury railway station was built in 1857 on the 1600 mm (5 ft 3 in) broad-gauge main northern line to Gawler. In 1917 it became a junction where a new line to Long Plains diverged north-west. In 1982, this latter line was converted to 1435 mm (4 ft 8 1/2 in) standard gauge. In 1985, the State Transport Authority demolished the historic station buildings to make way for a bus–rail interchange.

Salisbury's first police station was established in 1859.

In 1851, the first Methodist Church was erected. Saint Augustine's Catholic Church was completed in March 1857. Saint John's Anglican Church was opened for service in 1865.

The area's first school, Salisbury Public School, was completed in 1877.

In 1881, Salisbury's town population was between 400 and 500.

The District Council of Salisbury was established in 1933 (amalgamating Yatala North south of the Little Para and Munno Para West to the north) which centred local governance of the area on the main population centre between Enfield and Gawler, the township of Salisbury.

== Influx of inhabitants ==
During the Second World War, in 1940, an explosives and filling factory – the Salisbury Explosives Factory – was established at Penfield, 2 kilometres (1.2 miles) to the north. Covering about 12 km^{2} (4.5 mi^{2}), it commenced production in mid-1942. By January 1943, 6500 persons were employed, producing 135,000 shells, bombs and mines per week.The population of the district doubled to more than 4000, most being concentrated in the Salisbury township, bringing to an end the bucolic life of the townspeople. Four years after the war had ended and the factory had closed, a large influx of newcomers again occurred when about 1000 employees of a new rocket testing project were progressively accommodated at a new South Australian Housing Trust estate at Salisbury North, which started to take shape in 1949.

== Present-day demographics ==
In the 21st century, Salisbury has been a popular destination for immigrants. In the 2021 census, 52.1% of the Salisbury population were born in Australia. Other countries of birth were England 4.2%, Bhutan 4%, Myanmar 3.8%, Afghanistan 3.7% and Nepal 3.3%. 52.2% spoke English only at home. Other languages spoken at home were Nepali 8.0%, Hazaraghi 3.6%, Italian 3%, Vietnamese 2.2% and Arabic 1.9%.

== Politics ==
Salisbury is a constituent of the 33-times-larger (Note: 158.1 square kilometres (61.0 square miles) versus 4.8 square kilometres (1.9 square miles).) City of Salisbury local government area. As of 2023, there were 13 City of Salisbury councillors: 7 Australian Labor Party (ALP) and 6 independent. The state member of parliament for the electoral district of Ramsay was Zoe Bettison (ALP), and the federal member, for the Division of Spence, was Matt Burnell (ALP).

Two South Australian Australian Labor Party leaders, Lynn Arnold (Premier 1992–1993) and Mike Rann (Premier 2002–2011) both represented the Salisbury area in the South Australian Parliament. Arnold was elected as the MP for Ramsay, and then Taylor, and Rann was elected as the MP for Briggs and Ramsay.

== Transport ==
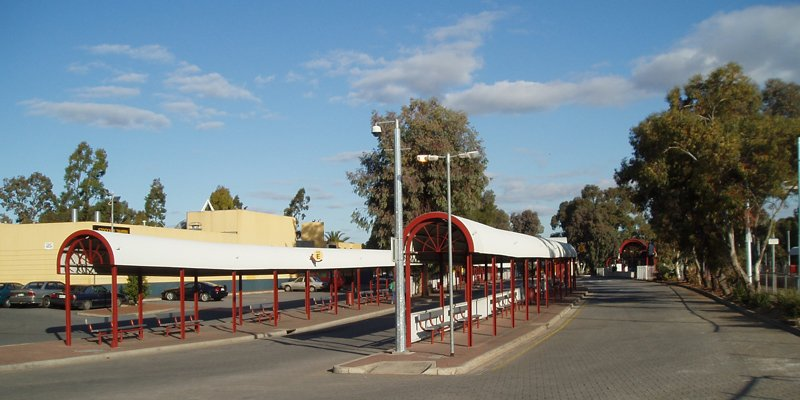
Salisbury Interchange looking south, with the rail line on the far right

Trains to and from Adelaide and Gawler from Salisbury operate every 15 minutes at off-peak times on Monday to Friday, and every 30 minutes during the day on Saturday and Sunday. In the evening, services run every hour. In morning peak hours, there are several trains that run non-stop between Salisbury and Adelaide (or make only one stop, at Mawson Interchange). These are used by a significant number of city workers who either park their vehicle or transfer from buses at Salisbury Interchange.

Local buses from Salisbury Interchange, scheduled to connect with trains to and from Adelaide, use the Adelaide Metro integrated ticketing system. In May 2012 there were 13 local bus routes providing links to many of the northern suburbs, such as routes 400 and 430 to Elizabeth, route 415V to Golden Grove, routes 224, 225, 411 to Mawson Lakes, routes 225, 500, 502, 560 to Para Hills, routes 401, 411 to Paralowie and routes 404, 405 to Parafield Gardens.

== Churches ==
The first St John's Anglican Church was established on the block in Church Street about 1846 or 1850, one of the first churches to be constructed in Salisbury. As the size of the congregation increased, a second church, designed by Daniel Garlick in Gothic style, was built in 1865, after the first foundation stone was laid by Bishop Augustus Short in 1858. The smaller old church was used as a school from 1851 to 1877 in addition to serving as a church until 1865. The replacement church was gutted by fire in 1989, after being heritage-listed on the Register of the National Estate for its fine stained glass windows and other significant architectural and historical features. In 1995 an auditorium was built connecting the church and the church hall. The inaugural Edmund Wright Heritage Award for Heritage Places in 2003 was won by Peter Moeck for the new auditorium project by Brown Falconer. As of 2024 the official name of the church is Church of Saint John The Evangelist, but it is known as St John's Anglican Church.

In 1851, the first Methodist Church was erected. St. Augustine's Catholic Church was completed in March 1857.

== Retail ==
The major retail zone in Salisbury is the Parabanks Shopping Centre, a short distance from Salisbury Interchange, first opened about 1977. The single-floor complex includes 74 stores and 3 anchor stores, with a total floor area of 23,800 m^{2}, and about 1400 parking spaces. In 2008, property group Stockland sold the shopping centre to the Angaet Group. In 2015, an $18 million redevelopment of the centre was approved by the Salisbury Council. The redevelopment consisted of three stages, with five specialty stores added to the eastern side mall, the relocation of the Coles supermarket and external upgrades, which were completed in 2017.

== Gallery ==
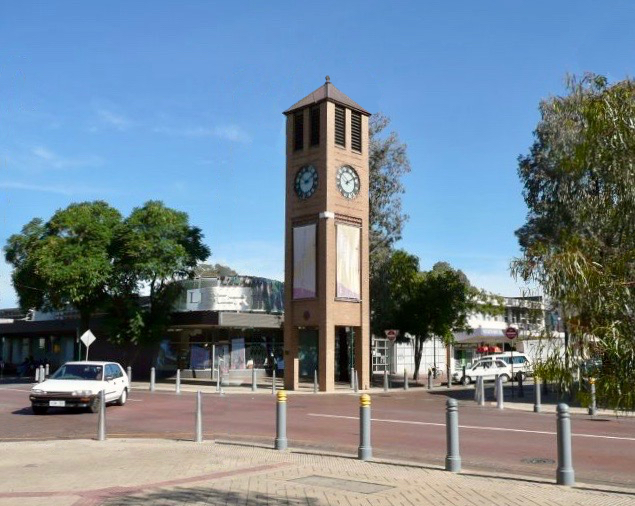

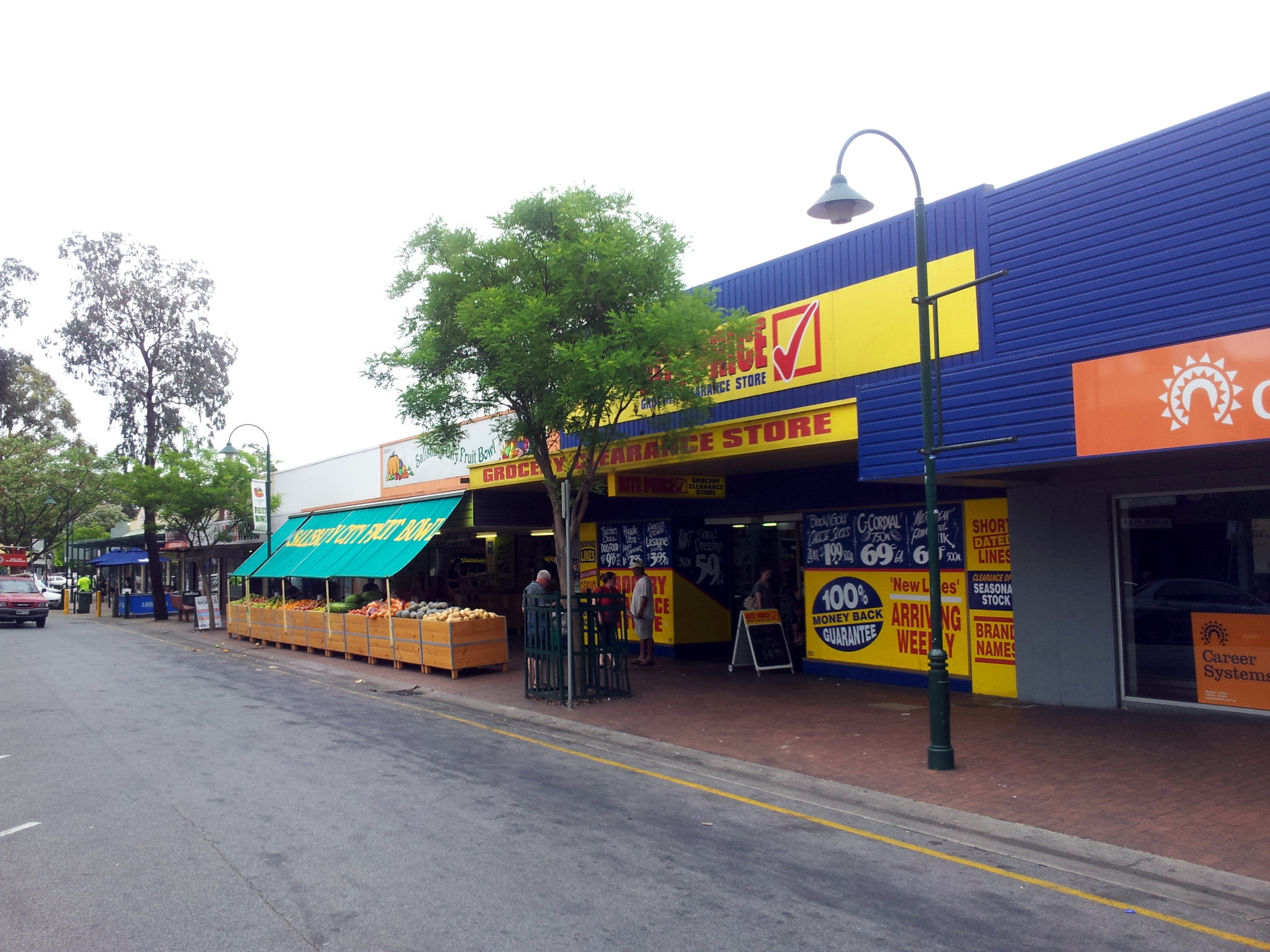

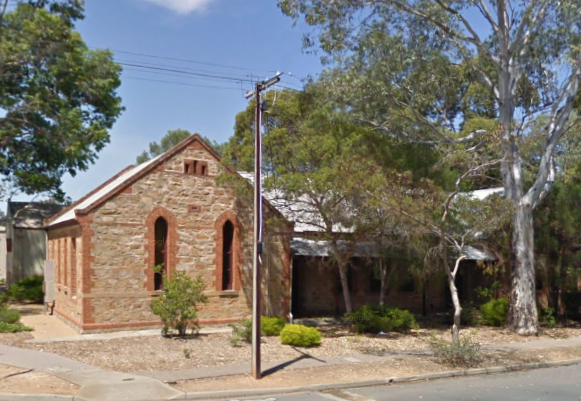

City centre clocktower

Shops in John Street

Original Salisbury Public School building in Mary Street, now a part of the TAFE campus

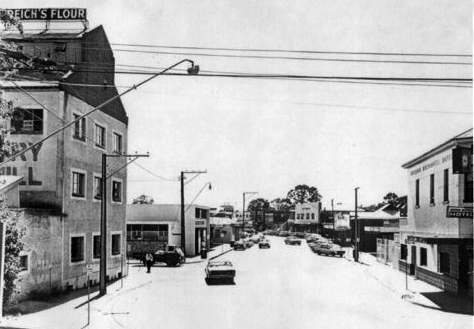

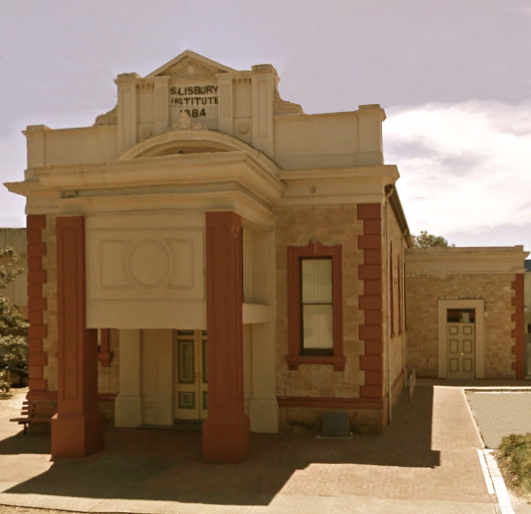

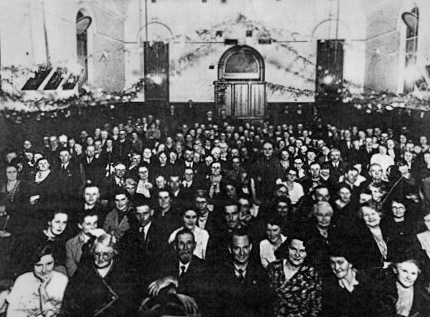

John Street in the 1950s, with Heidenreich's flour mill and Governor MacDonnell hotel

Salisbury Institute, which has had many roles since 1884, including a cinema

A reception for musician Ruby Davy at Salisbury Institute in 1936

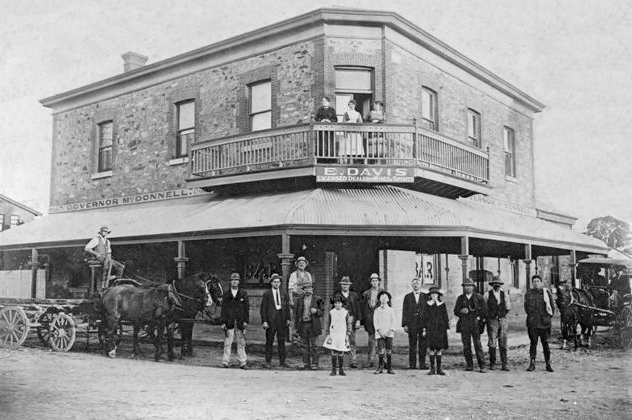

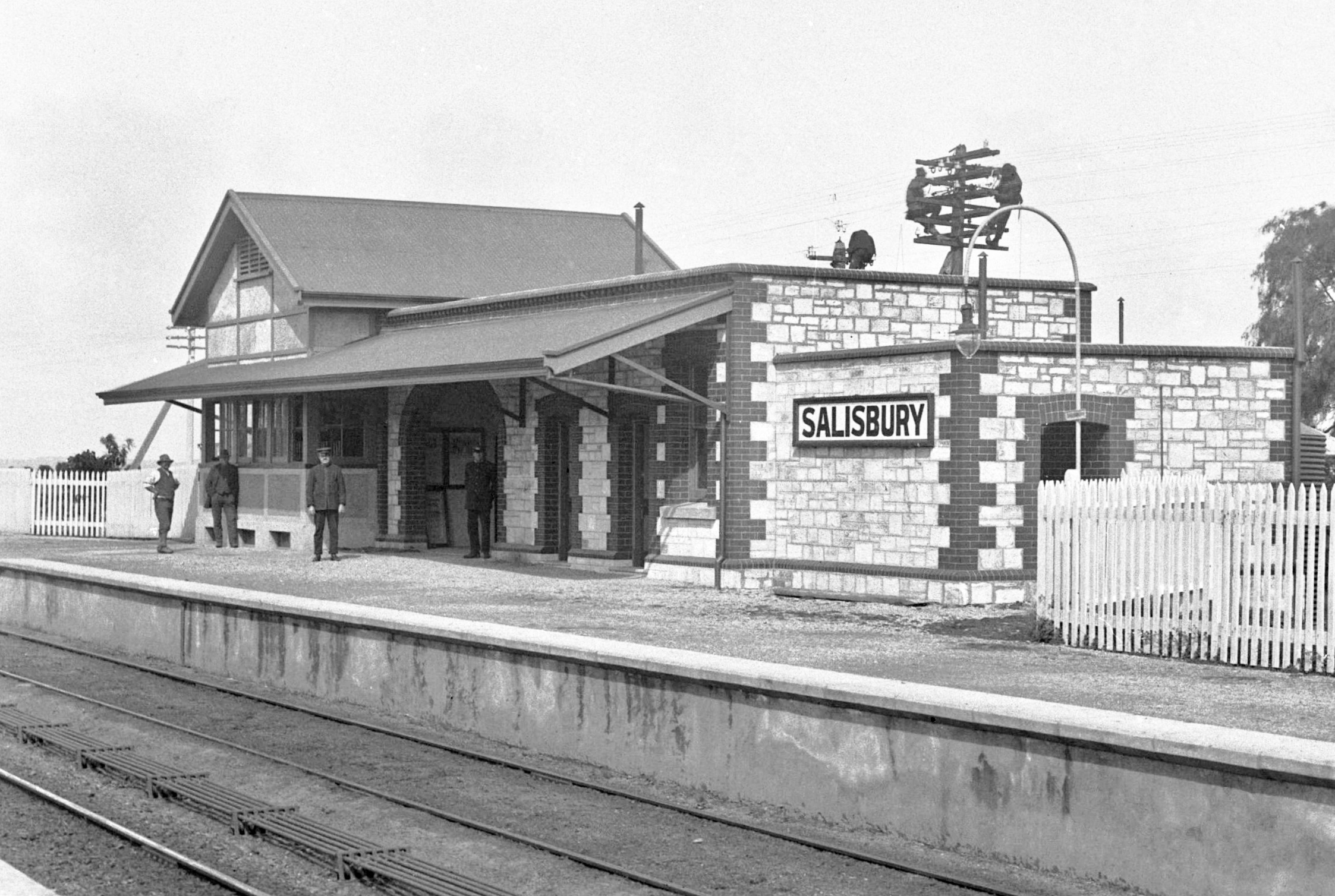

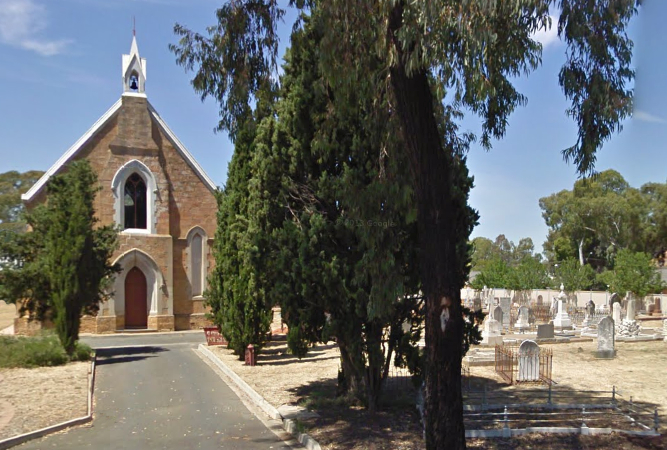

The Governor MacDonnell hotel, first available "watering hole" for workers at the munitions factory (later LRWE/WRE) until 6 o'clock Closing

Station building on the northbound line platform, now demolished together with its southbound counterpart

St John's Anglican church and cemetery in Church Street

== See also ==
- List of Adelaide suburbs
