= Salisbury East, South Australia =

Salisbury East
- Suburb
- Country: Australia
- State: South Australia
- City: Adelaide
- LGAs: City of Salisbury; City of Tea Tree Gully
- Location: 20 km (12 mi) from Adelaide

Government
  - State electorates: King; Wright
  - Federal division: Makin

Area
  - Total: 7.9 km^{2} (3.1 sq mi)

Population
  - Total: 9,273 (SAL 2021)
- Postcode: 5109
Suburbs around Salisbury East
Salisbury Park	Salisbury Heights	Greenwith
Brahma Lodge	Salisbury East	Golden Grove
Parafield	Para Hills	Wynn Vale

Salisbury East (/ˈsɔːlzbəri/ SAWLZ-bər-ee) is a suburb of Adelaide, South Australia, located 20 kilometres north of the Adelaide CBD. The residential part of the suburb is in the local government area (LGA) of the City of Salisbury, however the eastern part of the Cobbler Creek Recreation Park is in the boundaries of the City of Tea Tree Gully.

== Demographics ==
In the 2021 census, Salisbury East had a population of 9,273. Its median age was 40, lower than 41 for all South Australia, but higher than 38 for all Australia and 39 for Greater Adelaide. 49% of the population were male and 51% were female. 40% reported being of English ancestry and 30.3% being of Australian ancestry; the next most common backgrounds were Scottish (7%), German (6.1%), and Irish (6.1%). Around three-quarters only spoke English at home, but a number of languages were better-represented in Salisbury East than the general South Australian population; these were Hazaragi (2.3% vs 0.4%), Hakha Chin (1.3% vs 0.1%), and Dari (1.2% vs 0.2%). Arabic and Italian were the other two most spoken non-English languages.

10.5% of the population of Salisbury East reported holding a bachelor's degree or higher, compared to 22.7% of South Australians and 26.3% of Australians. 12.9% and 10.5% reported having left school in year 10 or 11 respectively, above the average for South Australia (9.4% and 8.7%) and Australia (10% and 4.6%). Nearly one in ten had less than a year 10 education. 53.5% of Salisbury East residents reported being in the labour force, while 42.4% were not, compared to 60% and 35.5% for South Australia. The unemployment rate was 7.8%, compared to 5.4% for the state and 5.1% for the country. Amongst employed residents, the most common reported employment categories were "technicians and trade workers" (16.3%), "clerical and administrative workers" (14.8%), and "labourers" (14.4%). 11.8% were employed as "professionals", against 21.5% of South Australians and 24% of Australians. The median weekly individual and household incomes respectively were AU$599 and AU$1,163, while the equivalents for all South Australians were AU$734 and AU$1,455.

40.4% of Salisbury East residents reported having no religious affiliation, while 6.1% did not answer the question. Catholicism, Anglicanism, and Islam were the main reported religions, at 14.2%, 8.3%, and 6.5% respectively. Salisbury East had a proportionately larger Muslim population than South Australia (2.3%) or Australia (3.5%).

== See also ==
- List of Adelaide suburbs
