= Results of the 2018 South Australian state election (Legislative Council) =

2018 South Australian state election (Legislative Council)
- 17 March 2018

11 of the 22 seats in the Legislative Council 11 seats needed for a majority
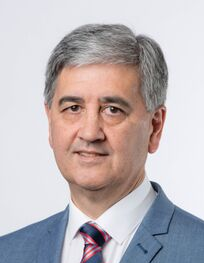

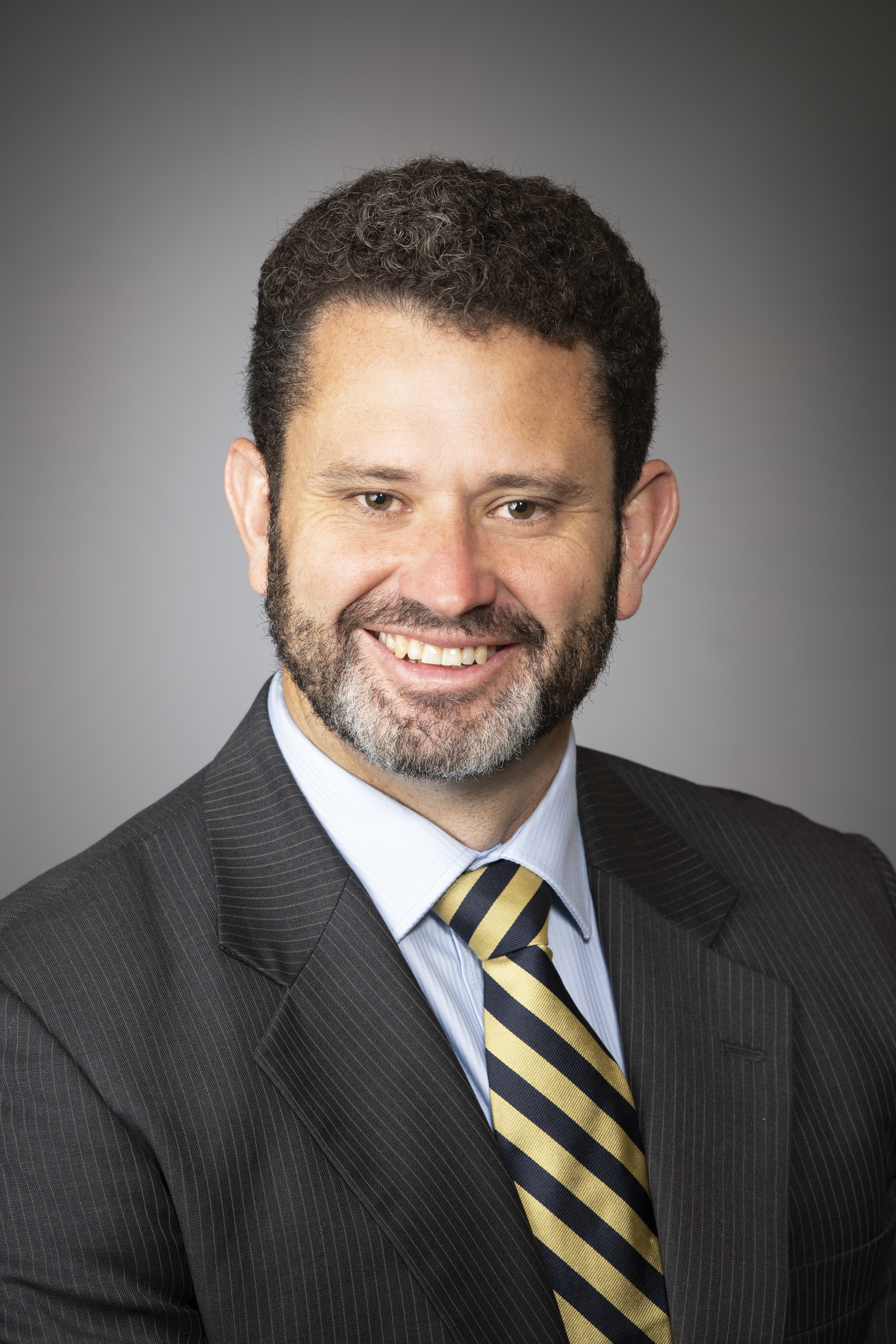

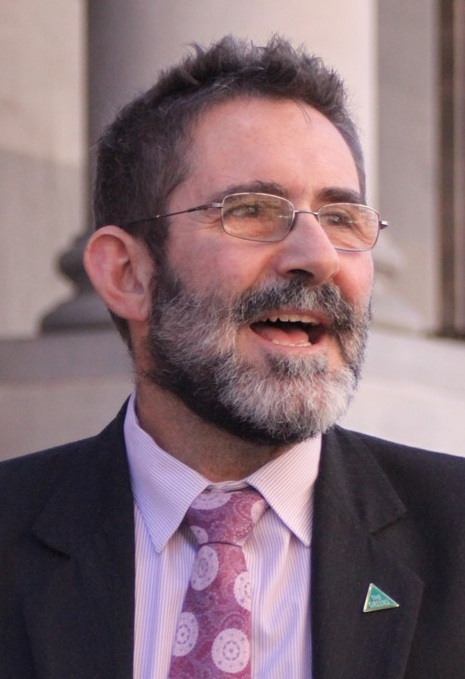

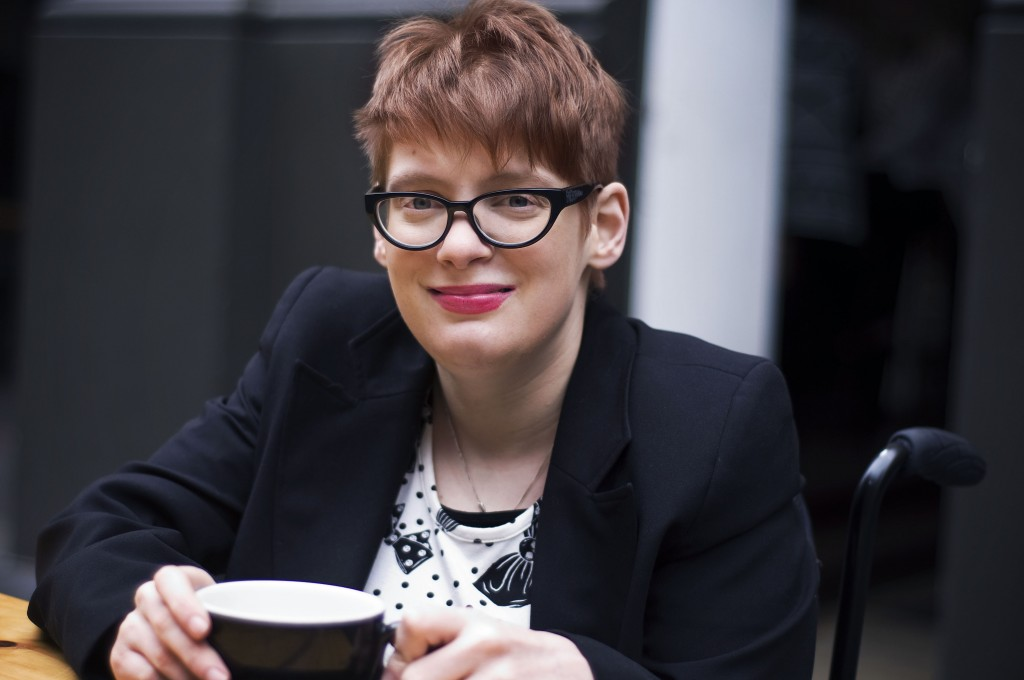
	First party	Second party	Third party
Leader	Rob Lucas	Kyam Maher (not up for election)	None
Party	Liberal	Labor	SA Best
Seats before	8	8	0
Seats won	5 (Note: Including Dennis Hood, who defected to the Liberals from the Conservatives nine days after the election (and thus well before the first sitting of Parliament).)	4	2
Seats after	9	8	2
Seat change	▲1	Steady	▲2
Popular vote	338,700	304,229	203,364
Percentage	32.23%	28.95%	19.35%
Swing	▼3.76pp	▼2.01pp	▲6.46pp
	Fourth party	Fifth party	Sixth party
Leader	Mark Parnell (not up for election)	John Darley (not up for election)	Kelly Vincent (lost seat)
Party	Greens	Advance SA	Dignity
Seats before	2	1	1
Seats won	1	0	0
Seats after	2	1	0
Seat change	Steady	Steady	▼1
Popular vote	61,610	4,227	20,337
Percentage	5.86%	0.40%	1.94%
Swing	▼0.59pp	▲0.40pp	▲1.01pp

This is a list of results for the Legislative Council at the 2018 South Australian state election.

The 11 of 22 seats up for election were 4 Liberal, 4 Labor, 1 Green, 1 Conservative and 1 Dignity. The outcome was 4 Liberal, 4 Labor, 2 SA Best and 1 Green. Carrying over from the 2014 election were 4 Liberal, 4 Labor, 1 Green, 1 Advance SA, and 1 Conservative; although the Conservative, Dennis Hood, defected to the Liberals nine days after the 2018 state election.

So from 2018 to 2020, the 22 seat upper house composition was 9 Liberal on the government benches, 8 Labor on the opposition benches, and 5 to minor parties on the crossbench, consisting of 2 SA Best, 2 Greens, and 1 Advance SA. The government therefore required at least three additional non-government members to form a majority and carry votes on the floor.

In 2020, John Dawkins was expelled from the Liberal Party for breaking party rules by nominating himself for President of the Legislative Council. The 22 seat upper house composition before the 2022 election was therefore 8 Liberal, 8 Labor, 2 SA Best, 2 Greens, 1 Advance SA, and 1 independent.

== Election results ==
2018 South Australian state election: Legislative Council
Party	Candidate	Votes	%	±%
Liberal	1. David Ridgway (elected 1); 2. Stephen Wade (elected 4); 3. Terry Stephens (elected 7); 4. Jing Lee (elected 9); 5. Bernadette Abraham; 6. Clementina Maione	338,700	32.23	−3.76
Labor	1. Emily Bourke (elected 2); 2. Justin Hanson (elected 5); 3. Irene Pnevmatikos (elected 8); 4. Clare Scriven (elected 11); 5. Trimann Gill; 6. Christina Lien	304,229	28.95	−2.01
SA Best	1. Connie Bonaros (elected 3); 2. Frank Pangallo (elected 6); 3. Sam Johnson; 4. Andrea Madeley; 5. Peter Vincent	203,364	19.35	+6.46
Greens	1. Tammy Franks (elected 10); 2. Matt Farrell; 3. Ashley Sutherland; 4. Rosa Hillam; 5. Kate Wylie	61,610	5.86	−0.59
Conservatives	1. Robert Brokenshire; 2. Nicolle Jachmann	36,525	3.48	−0.88
Liberal Democrats	1. Michael Noack; 2. Stephen Humble	25,956	2.47	+1.87
Animal Justice	1. Angela Martin; 2. Wendy Davey	22,822	2.17	+1.30
Dignity	1. Kelly Vincent; 2. Diana Bleby; 3. Ryan Mann; 4. Esther Simbi	20,337	1.94	+1.01
Child Protection	1. Tony Tonkin; 2. Nadia Bergineti	15,530	1.48	+1.48
Stop Population Growth Now	1. Bob Couch; 2. Michael Roberts	12,878	1.23	+0.84
Advance SA	1. Peter Humphries; 2. Jenny Low	4,227	0.40	+0.40
Independent Amrik Singh Thandi	1. Amrik Singh Thandi; 2. MJ Thandi	3,572	0.34	+0.34
Ungrouped	Luke Koumi	723	0.07	+0.07
Ungrouped	Gail Kilby	307	0.03	+0.03
Ungrouped	John Le Raye	94	0.01	+0.01
Total formal votes		1,050,874	95.94	−0.12
Informal votes		44,497	4.06	+0.12
Turnout		1,095,371	91.15	−0.98

== See also ==
- Candidates of the 2018 South Australian state election
- Members of the South Australian Legislative Council, 2018–2022
