= Results of the 2018 South Australian state election (House of Assembly) =

South Australian state election, 17 March 2018 House of Assembly << 2014–2022 >>
Enrolled voters	1,201,775				
Votes cast	1,093,584		Turnout	91.00	−0.94
Informal votes	44,871		Informal	4.10	+1.01
Summary of votes by party
Party	Primary votes	%	Swing	Seats	Change
Liberal	398,182	37.97	−6.81	25	+3
Labor	343,896	32.79	−3.01	19	−4
SA Best	148,360	14.15	+14.15	0	0
Greens	69,826	6.66	−2.05	0	0
Conservatives	31,826	3.03	−3.21	0	0
Dignity	15,565	1.48	+0.90	0	0
Animal Justice	3,262	0.31	+0.31	0	0
Danig	732	0.07	+0.07	0	0
Stop Population Growth Now	284	0.03	+0.03	0	0
Independent	36,780	3.51	−0.22	3	+1
Total	1,048,713			47	
Two-party-preferred
Liberal	544,654	51.94	–1.07		
Labor	504,059	48.06	+1.07		

This is a list of House of Assembly results for the 2018 South Australian state election.

== Results by district ==
=== Adelaide ===
2018 South Australian state election: Adelaide
Party	Candidate	Votes	%	±%
Liberal	Rachel Sanderson	10,226	47.2	−2.1
Labor	Jo Chapley	7,750	35.8	+0.5
Greens	Robert Simms	2,739	12.6	+0.7
Dignity	Betty-Jean Price	946	4.4	+1.1
Total formal votes		21,661	97.8	−0.3
Informal votes		487	2.2	+0.3
Turnout		22,148	88.8	+2.4
Two-party-preferred result
Liberal	Rachel Sanderson	11,043	51.0	−2.0
Labor	Jo Chapley	10,618	49.0	+2.0
Liberal hold		Swing	−2.0	

=== Badcoe ===
2018 South Australian state election: Badcoe
Party	Candidate	Votes	%	±%
Labor	Jayne Stinson	8,286	38.7	−2.8
Liberal	Lachlan Clyne	6,845	32.0	−8.6
SA Best	Kate Bickford	3,261	15.2	+15.2
Greens	Stef Rozitis	1,680	7.9	−3.9
Conservatives	Robyn Munro	533	2.5	−1.8
Independent	John Woodward	397	1.9	+1.9
Dignity	Lily Durkin	384	1.8	+0.7
Total formal votes		21,386	96.0	−0.7
Informal votes		901	4.0	+0.7
Turnout		22,287	90.5	−1.3
Two-party-preferred result
Labor	Jayne Stinson	11,867	55.5	+1.4
Liberal	Lachlan Clyne	9,519	44.5	−1.4
Labor hold		Swing	+1.4	

=== Black ===
2018 South Australian state election: Black
Party	Candidate	Votes	%	±%
Liberal	David Speirs	12,538	50.6	+8.2
Labor	Randall Wilson	7,870	31.7	−3.7
Greens	Dami Barnes	1,702	6.9	−0.8
Independent	Rob De Jonge	1,422	5.7	+5.7
Conservatives	Lionel Zschech	698	2.8	−1.6
Dignity	Anastasia Svetlichny	561	2.3	+2.3
Total formal votes		24,791	96.1	−1.3
Informal votes		1,001	3.9	+1.3
Turnout		25,792	92.5	+0.4
Two-party-preferred result
Liberal	David Speirs	14,546	58.7	+6.4
Labor	Randall Wilson	10,245	41.3	−6.4
Liberal hold		Swing	+6.4	

=== Bragg ===
2018 South Australian state election: Bragg
Party	Candidate	Votes	%	±%
Liberal	Vickie Chapman	14,567	63.1	−0.8
Labor	Rick Sarre	5,513	23.9	−0.4
Greens	Neil Zwaans	2,072	9.0	−2.1
Dignity	Taylah Neagle	927	4.0	+3.8
Total formal votes		23,079	97.7	−0.5
Informal votes		541	2.3	+0.5
Turnout		23,620	91.8	+0.5
Two-party-preferred result
Liberal	Vickie Chapman	15,566	67.4	+0.3
Labor	Rick Sarre	7,513	32.6	−0.3
Liberal hold		Swing	+0.3	

=== Chaffey ===
2018 South Australian state election: Chaffey
Party	Candidate	Votes	%	±%
Liberal	Tim Whetstone	9,489	46.1	−17.6
SA Best	Michelle Campbell	5,136	24.9	+24.9
Labor	Sim Singh-Malhi	3,972	19.3	+1.7
Conservatives	Trevor Scott	1,366	6.6	−6.6
Greens	Philip Pointer	404	2.0	−3.6
Dignity	Richard Challis	229	1.1	+1.1
Total formal votes		20,596	95.7	−0.9
Informal votes		935	4.3	+0.9
Turnout		21,531	91.6	−1.3
Two-party-preferred result
Liberal	Tim Whetstone	13,857	67.3	−6.7
Labor	Sim Singh-Malhi	6,739	32.7	+6.7
Two-candidate-preferred result
Liberal	Tim Whetstone	12,059	58.6	−15.4
SA Best	Michelle Campbell	8,537	41.5	+41.5
Liberal hold				

=== Cheltenham ===
2018 South Australian state election: Cheltenham
Party	Candidate	Votes	%	±%
Labor	Jay Weatherill	11,661	52.4	−2.9
Liberal	Penny Pratt	4,954	22.3	−7.2
SA Best	John Noonan	3,369	15.1	+15.1
Greens	Steffi Medrow	1,403	6.3	−2.5
Dignity	Madeline McCaul	537	2.4	+2.4
Independent	Vincent Scali	337	1.5	+1.5
Total formal votes		22,261	94.9	−1.7
Informal votes		1,195	5.1	+1.7
Turnout		23,456	90.0	+5.0
Two-party-preferred result
Labor	Jay Weatherill	14,662	65.9	+1.5
Liberal	Penny Pratt	7,599	34.1	−1.5
Labor hold		Swing	+1.5	

=== Colton ===
2018 South Australian state election: Colton
Party	Candidate	Votes	%	±%
Liberal	Matt Cowdrey	11,685	47.6	−2.4
Labor	Angela Vaughan	7,733	31.5	−7.7
SA Best	Jassmine Wood	3,459	14.1	+14.1
Greens	Paul Petherick	1,404	5.7	−1.7
Dignity	Ted Evans	271	1.1	+1.1
Total formal votes		24,552	96.8	−0.6
Informal votes		808	3.2	+0.6
Turnout		25,360	91.9	+3.2
Two-party-preferred result
Liberal	Matt Cowdrey	14,211	57.9	+4.0
Labor	Angela Vaughan	10,341	42.1	−4.0
Liberal hold		Swing	+4.0	

=== Croydon ===
2018 South Australian state election: Croydon
Party	Candidate	Votes	%	±%
Labor	Peter Malinauskas	11,739	58.0	−2.3
Liberal	Daria Hextell	3,185	15.7	−7.8
SA Best	Julia Karpathakis	2,125	10.5	+10.5
Greens	Nathan Lange	1,424	7.0	−3.3
Animal Justice	Millie Hammerstein	803	4.0	+4.0
Conservatives	Rachael Runner	365	1.8	−3.0
Dignity	Lucy McGinley	241	1.2	+1.2
Independent	Michael Lesiw	176	0.9	+0.9
Danig	Gabor Gesti	172	0.9	+0.9
Total formal votes		20,230	93.0	−3.4
Informal votes		1,511	7.0	+3.4
Turnout		21,741	88.3	+5.3
Two-party-preferred result
Labor	Peter Malinauskas	15,044	74.4	+3.2
Liberal	Daria Hextell	5,186	25.6	−3.2
Labor hold		Swing	+3.2	

=== Davenport ===
2018 South Australian state election: Davenport
Party	Candidate	Votes	%	±%
Liberal	Steve Murray	9,306	42.1	−0.3
Labor	Jonette Thorsteinsen	5,275	23.9	+3.8
SA Best	Karen Hockley	4,604	20.8	+20.8
Greens	John Photakis	1,600	7.2	−0.2
Independent	Dan Golding	1,317	6.0	+6.0
Total formal votes		22,102	96.5	−1.3
Informal votes		792	3.5	+1.3
Turnout		22,894	92.3	−0.7
Two-party-preferred result
Liberal	Steve Murray	12,992	58.8	−0.7
Labor	Jonette Thorsteinsen	9,110	41.2	+0.7
Liberal hold		Swing	−0.7	

=== Dunstan ===
2018 South Australian state election: Dunstan
Party	Candidate	Votes	%	±%
Liberal	Steven Marshall	10,517	47.0	−3.4
Labor	Matt Loader	6,514	29.1	−6.6
SA Best	Jack Noonan	2,901	13.0	+13.0
Greens	Harriet De Kok	1,892	8.4	−2.7
Dignity	Ben Wilson	571	2.5	+0.4
Total formal votes		22,395	97.4	−0.4
Informal votes		599	2.6	+0.4
Turnout		22,994	90.5	+1.1
Two-party-preferred result
Liberal	Steven Marshall	12,566	56.1	+2.5
Labor	Matt Loader	9,829	43.9	−2.5
Liberal hold		Swing	+2.5	

=== Elder ===
2018 South Australian state election: Elder
Party	Candidate	Votes	%	±%
Liberal	Carolyn Habib	9,812	42.3	−5.1
Labor	Annabel Digance	7,347	31.7	−2.3
SA Best	Michael Slattery	3,257	14.0	+14.0
Greens	Jody Moate	1,679	7.2	−3.5
Conservatives	Shawn Van Groesen	669	2.9	−1.7
Dignity	Nick Schumi	433	1.9	−1.3
Total formal votes		23,197	96.7	−0.2
Informal votes		794	3.3	+0.2
Turnout		23,991	91.9	+2.5
Two-party-preferred result
Liberal	Carolyn Habib	12,609	54.4	+0.3
Labor	Annabel Digance	10,588	45.6	−0.3
Liberal hold		Swing	+0.3	

=== Elizabeth ===
2018 South Australian state election: Elizabeth
Party	Candidate	Votes	%	±%
Labor	Lee Odenwalder	11,828	51.0	+1.1
SA Best	Phil Gallasch	4,351	18.8	+18.8
Liberal	Sharka Byrne	4,083	17.6	−11.3
Greens	Wendy Morgan	1,570	6.8	−0.7
Conservatives	John Mathiesen	1,353	5.8	−5.2
Total formal votes		23,185	94.3	−1.5
Informal votes		1,401	5.7	+1.5
Turnout		24,586	86.6	+2.5
Two-party-preferred result
Labor	Lee Odenwalder	15,686	67.7	+6.6
Liberal	Sharka Byrne	7,499	32.3	−6.6
Two-candidate-preferred result
Labor	Lee Odenwalder	14,808	63.9	+2.9
SA Best	Phil Gallasch	8,377	36.1	+36.1
Labor hold				

=== Enfield ===
2018 South Australian state election: Enfield
Party	Candidate	Votes	%	±%
Labor	John Rau	8,882	40.9	−5.1
Liberal	Deepa Mathew	5,761	26.6	−10.5
SA Best	Carol Martin	4,004	18.5	+18.5
Greens	Cassie Alvey	1,802	8.3	−0.0
Conservatives	Steve Edmonds	718	3.3	−2.9
Dignity	Emma Cresdee	526	2.4	+2.1
Total formal votes		21,693	95.5	−0.7
Informal votes		1,017	4.5	+0.7
Turnout		22,710	88.6	+6.1
Two-party-preferred result
Labor	John Rau	12,554	57.9	+2.3
Liberal	Deepa Mathew	9,139	42.1	−2.3
Labor hold		Swing	+2.3	

=== Finniss ===
2018 South Australian state election: Finniss
Party	Candidate	Votes	%	±%
Liberal	David Basham	9,319	43.6	−8.6
SA Best	Joe Hill	5,515	25.8	+25.8
Labor	Russell Skinner	3,648	17.1	−7.5
Greens	Marc Mullette	1,670	7.8	−4.3
Conservatives	Bruce Hicks	1,207	5.7	−4.9
Total formal votes		21,359	97.2	+0.1
Informal votes		626	2.8	−0.1
Turnout		21,985	92.3	+2.1
Two-party-preferred result
Liberal	David Basham	13,718	64.2	+1.1
Labor	Russell Skinner	7,641	35.8	−1.1
Two-candidate-preferred result
Liberal	David Basham	11,669	54.6	−8.5
SA Best	Joe Hill	9,690	45.4	+45.4
Liberal hold				

=== Flinders ===
2018 South Australian state election: Flinders
Party	Candidate	Votes	%	±%
Liberal	Peter Treloar	13,565	68.2	−3.5
Labor	Julie Watson	3,598	18.1	+2.5
Greens	Ian Dudley	1,429	7.2	+0.9
Conservatives	Tony Parker	1,300	6.5	+0.2
Total formal votes		19,892	97.0	−0.6
Informal votes		606	3.0	+0.6
Turnout		20,498	90.1	+0.3
Two-party-preferred result
Liberal	Peter Treloar	15,176	76.3	−2.6
Labor	Julie Watson	4,716	23.7	+2.6
Liberal hold		Swing	−2.6	

=== Florey ===
2018 South Australian state election: Florey
Party	Candidate	Votes	%	±%
Labor	Rik Morris	7,451	32.8	−17.1
Independent	Frances Bedford	6,962	30.6	+30.6
Liberal	Gagan Sharma	4,768	21.0	−13.4
Conservatives	John Peake	1,132	5.0	−4.1
Greens	Adam Gatt	1,101	4.8	−1.8
Animal Justice	Geoff Russell	885	3.9	+3.9
Dignity	Suzi Waechter	418	1.8	+1.8
Total formal votes		22,717	93.3	−2.8
Informal votes		1,621	6.7	+2.8
Turnout		24,338	91.0	−0.4
Two-party-preferred result
Labor	Rik Morris	13,852	61.0	+1.9
Liberal	Gagan Sharma	8,865	39.0	−1.9
Two-candidate-preferred result
Independent	Frances Bedford	12,746	56.1	+56.1
Labor	Rik Morris	9,971	43.9	−15.2
Independent gain from Labor				

=== Frome ===
2018 South Australian state election: Frome
Party	Candidate	Votes	%	±%
Independent	Geoff Brock	9,516	46.0	+2.1
Liberal	Kendall Jackson	7,929	38.3	+3.0
Labor	Annette Elliot	2,077	10.0	−2.4
Greens	Paul Birkwood	622	3.0	+0.2
Dignity	Cat Connor	556	2.7	+2.7
Total formal votes		20,700	96.7	−0.9
Informal votes		717	3.3	+0.9
Turnout		21,417	91.8	−1.2
Two-party-preferred result
Liberal	Kendall Jackson	12,648	61.1	+1.3
Labor	Annette Elliot	8,052	38.9	−1.3
Two-candidate-preferred result
Independent	Geoff Brock	12,043	58.2	−1.2
Liberal	Kendall Jackson	8,657	41.8	+1.2
Independent hold		Swing	−1.2	

=== Gibson ===
2018 South Australian state election: Gibson
Party	Candidate	Votes	%	±%
Liberal	Corey Wingard	10,965	48.1	+2.4
Labor	Matthew Carey	5,843	25.6	−9.1
SA Best	Kris Hanna	4,107	18.0	+18.0
Greens	Gwydion Rozitisolds	1,326	5.8	−3.0
Dignity	Garry Connor	570	2.5	+1.5
Total formal votes		22,811	96.8	−0.6
Informal votes		762	3.2	+0.6
Turnout		23,573	91.3	+3.1
Two-party-preferred result
Liberal	Corey Wingard	13,537	59.3	+5.6
Labor	Matthew Carey	9,274	40.7	−5.6
Liberal hold		Swing	+5.6	

=== Giles ===
2018 South Australian state election: Giles
Party	Candidate	Votes	%	±%
Labor	Eddie Hughes	9,176	47.0	−2.7
SA Best	Tom Antonio	5,070	25.9	+25.9
Liberal	Mark Walsh	3,611	18.5	−20.8
Greens	Anna Taylor	713	3.6	−1.3
Conservatives	Cheryl Kaminski	502	2.6	−3.6
Dignity	Cyanne Westerman	470	2.4	+2.4
Total formal votes		19,542	96.7	−0.3
Informal votes		662	3.3	+0.3
Turnout		20,204	86.0	−1.5
Two-party-preferred result
Labor	Eddie Hughes	12,732	65.2	+10.0
Liberal	Mark Walsh	6,810	34.8	−10.0
Two-candidate-preferred result
Labor	Eddie Hughes	11,222	57.4	+2.2
SA Best	Tom Antonio	8,320	42.6	+42.6
Labor hold		Swing	+2.2	

=== Hammond ===
2018 South Australian state election: Hammond
Party	Candidate	Votes	%	±%
Liberal	Adrian Pederick	11,475	52.0	−5.1
SA Best	Kelly Gladigau	5,010	22.7	+22.7
Labor	Mat O'Brien	3,560	16.1	−7.7
Greens	Simon Hope	1,062	4.8	−1.3
Conservatives	Declan Paton	954	4.3	−4.6
Total formal votes		22,061	96.3	−0.5
Informal votes		843	3.7	+0.5
Turnout		22,904	91.5	+5.6
Two-party-preferred result
Liberal	Adrian Pederick	15,325	69.5	+2.7
Labor	Mat O'Brien	6,736	30.5	−2.7
Two-candidate-preferred result
Liberal	Adrian Pederick	13,697	62.1	−4.7
SA Best	Kelly Gladigau	8,364	37.9	+37.9
Liberal hold				

=== Hartley ===
2018 South Australian state election: Hartley
Party	Candidate	Votes	%	±%
Liberal	Vincent Tarzia	8,619	40.4	−7.3
SA Best	Nick Xenophon	5,319	24.9	+24.9
Labor	Grace Portolesi	5,117	24.0	−15.4
Greens	Lauren Zwaans	1,028	4.8	−3.1
Independent	Marijka Ryan	526	2.5	+2.5
Conservatives	Bob Jackson	475	2.2	−2.8
Dignity	Rick Neagle	239	1.1	+1.1
Total formal votes		21,323	95.3	−1.6
Informal votes		1,061	4.7	+1.6
Turnout		22,384	91.4	+1.4
Two-party-preferred result
Liberal	Vincent Tarzia	12,316	57.8	+4.7
Labor	Grace Portolesi	9,007	42.2	−4.7
Liberal hold		Swing	+4.7	

=== Heysen ===
2018 South Australian state election: Heysen
Party	Candidate	Votes	%	±%
Liberal	Josh Teague	9,227	40.7	−13.4
SA Best	John Illingworth	5,514	24.3	+24.3
Labor	Tony Webb	4,123	18.2	−2.1
Greens	Lynton Vonow	2,557	11.3	−8.3
Conservatives	Lynette Stevenson	785	3.5	+3.0
Dignity	Andrew Ey	467	2.1	−2.7
Total formal votes		22,673	96.7	−0.6
Informal votes		767	3.3	+0.6
Turnout		23,440	93.7	+2.0
Two-party-preferred result
Liberal	Josh Teague	13,259	58.5	−3.8
Labor	Tony Webb	9,414	41.5	+3.8
Two-candidate-preferred result
Liberal	Josh Teague	11,749	51.8	−10.4
SA Best	John Illingworth	10,924	48.2	+48.2
Liberal hold				

=== Hurtle Vale ===
2018 South Australian state election: Hurtle Vale
Party	Candidate	Votes	%	±%
Labor	Nat Cook	9,668	42.0	+5.4
Liberal	Aaron Duff	7,239	31.5	−4.5
SA Best	Michael O'Brien	3,648	15.9	+15.9
Greens	Nikki Mortier	1,123	4.9	−1.8
Conservatives	Bruce Malcolm	885	3.8	−4.4
Dignity	Donovan Cresdee	446	1.9	+1.9
Total formal votes		23,009	95.3	−1.2
Informal votes		1,137	4.7	+1.2
Turnout		24,146	92.5	+3.6
Two-party-preferred result
Labor	Nat Cook	12,726	55.3	+4.0
Liberal	Aaron Duff	10,283	44.7	−4.0
Labor hold		Swing	+4.0	

=== Kaurna ===
2018 South Australian state election: Kaurna
Party	Candidate	Votes	%	±%
Labor	Chris Picton	13,162	57.6	+10.9
Liberal	Simon McMahon	7,342	32.1	+0.5
Greens	Sean Cullen-MacAskill	2,358	10.3	+1.7
Total formal votes		22,862	95.7	−0.9
Informal votes		1,025	4.3	+0.9
Turnout		23,887	91.0	+7.8
Two-party-preferred result
Labor	Chris Picton	14,843	64.9	+5.7
Liberal	Simon McMahon	8,019	35.1	−5.7
Labor hold		Swing	+5.7	

=== Kavel ===
2018 South Australian state election: Kavel
Party	Candidate	Votes	%	±%
Liberal	Dan Cregan	10,374	48.1	−6.3
SA Best	Andrew Stratford	4,217	19.6	+19.6
Labor	Glen Dallimore	3,436	15.9	−6.0
Greens	Ian Grosser	1,963	9.1	−7.2
Animal Justice	Louise Pfeiffer	644	3.0	+3.0
Conservatives	Howard Hollow	615	2.9	−4.0
Dignity	Cristina Rodert	313	1.5	+0.9
Total formal votes		21,562	96.4	−0.8
Informal votes		816	3.6	+0.8
Turnout		22,378	92.7	+4.1
Two-party-preferred result
Liberal	Dan Cregan	13,965	64.8	+1.0
Labor	Glen Dallimore	7,597	35.2	−1.0
Two-candidate-preferred result
Liberal	Dan Cregan	12,878	59.7	−4.1
SA Best	Andrew Stratford	8,684	40.3	+40.3
Liberal hold				

=== King ===
2018 South Australian state election: King
Party	Candidate	Votes	%	±%
Liberal	Paula Luethen	8,932	36.8	−4.7
Labor	Julie Duncan	8,298	34.1	−7.0
SA Best	Giles Rositano	4,519	18.6	+18.6
Greens	Damon Adams	1,412	5.8	−0.6
Conservatives	Gary Balfort	1,138	4.7	−3.7
Total formal votes		24,299	96.0	−0.3
Informal votes		1,016	4.0	+0.3
Turnout		25,315	93.1	+4.6
Two-party-preferred result
Liberal	Paula Luethen	12,328	50.7	+0.7
Labor	Julie Duncan	11,971	49.3	−0.7
Liberal gain from Labor		Swing	+0.7	

=== Lee ===
2018 South Australian state election: Lee
Party	Candidate	Votes	%	±%
Labor	Stephen Mullighan	9,845	42.5	+0.4
Liberal	Steven Rypp	8,203	35.4	−5.5
SA Best	Andy Legrand	2,953	12.7	+12.7
Greens	Patrick O'Sullivan	1,023	4.4	−1.6
Conservatives	Vicki Jessop	731	3.2	−0.7
Dignity	Tiffany Littler	304	1.3	+1.3
Danig	Aristidis Kerpelis	127	0.5	+0.5
Total formal votes		23,186	95.6	−1.0
Informal votes		1,065	4.4	+1.0
Turnout		24,251	91.5	+2.1
Two-party-preferred result
Labor	Stephen Mullighan	12,485	53.8	+2.3
Liberal	Steven Rypp	10,701	46.2	−2.3
Labor hold		Swing	+2.3	

=== Light ===
2018 South Australian state election: Light
Party	Candidate	Votes	%	±%
Labor	Tony Piccolo	11,906	52.8	+6.0
Liberal	Karen McColl	7,527	33.4	−7.0
Greens	Felicity Green	1,606	7.1	+1.3
Conservatives	Carl Teusner	1,525	6.8	−0.3
Total formal votes		22,564	95.9	−1.2
Informal votes		953	4.1	+1.2
Turnout		23,517	90.5	+8.4
Two-party-preferred result
Labor	Tony Piccolo	13,516	59.9	+5.9
Liberal	Karen McColl	9,048	40.1	−5.9
Labor hold		Swing	+5.9	

=== MacKillop ===
2018 South Australian state election: MacKillop
Party	Candidate	Votes	%	±%
Liberal	Nick McBride	11,346	54.8	−10.2
SA Best	Tracy Hill	3,902	18.8	+18.8
Labor	Hilary Wigg	2,022	9.8	−4.9
Conservatives	Richard Bateman	1,799	8.7	+1.1
Independent	Jon Ey	1,142	5.5	+5.5
Greens	Donella Peters	492	2.4	−3.3
Total formal votes		20,703	95.9	−1.2
Informal votes		882	4.1	+1.2
Turnout		21,585	92.4	−0.9
Two-party-preferred result
Liberal	Nick McBride	15,519	75.0	−1.7
Labor	Hilary Wigg	5,184	25.0	+1.7
Two-candidate-preferred result
Liberal	Nick McBride	13,995	67.6	−9.1
SA Best	Tracy Hill	6,708	32.4	+32.4
Liberal hold				

=== Mawson ===
2018 South Australian state election: Mawson
Party	Candidate	Votes	%	±%
Liberal	Andy Gilfillan	7,697	34.7	−9.7
Labor	Leon Bignell	7,688	34.7	+1.7
SA Best	Hazel Wainwright	4,142	18.7	+18.7
Greens	Ami-Louise Harrison	1,789	8.1	−3.4
Conservatives	Heidi Greaves	867	3.9	−4.7
Total formal votes		22,183	96.7	−0.4
Informal votes		760	3.3	+0.4
Turnout		22,943	91.6	+3.8
Two-party-preferred result
Labor	Leon Bignell	11,149	50.3	+4.5
Liberal	Andy Gilfillan	11,034	49.7	−4.5
Labor gain from Liberal		Swing	+4.5	

=== Morialta ===
2018 South Australian state election: Morialta
Party	Candidate	Votes	%	±%
Liberal	John Gardner	10,332	44.3	−11.2
Labor	Peter Field	5,146	22.1	−5.6
SA Best	James Sadler	4,645	19.9	+19.9
Greens	Simon Roberts-Thomson	1,525	6.5	−4.3
Conservatives	Matt Smith	854	3.7	−2.3
Dignity	Tim Farrow	560	2.4	+2.4
Independent	Peter Smythe	240	1.0	+1.0
Total formal votes		23,302	95.9	−1.3
Informal votes		1,007	4.1	+1.3
Turnout		24,309	93.5	−0.2
Two-party-preferred result
Liberal	John Gardner	14,151	60.7	−1.5
Labor	Peter Field	9,151	39.3	+1.5
Liberal hold		Swing	−1.5	

=== Morphett ===
2018 South Australian state election: Morphett
Party	Candidate	Votes	%	±%
Liberal	Stephen Patterson	9,576	41.4	−11.1
Labor	Mark Siebentritt	5,929	25.6	−7.1
Independent	Duncan McFetridge	3,288	14.2	+14.2
SA Best	Simon Jones	2,790	12.1	+12.1
Greens	Chris Crabbe	1,187	5.1	−4.9
Dignity	Monica Kwan	379	1.6	+1.0
Total formal votes		23,149	96.7	−0.2
Informal votes		785	3.3	+0.2
Turnout		23,934	90.7	+2.4
Two-party-preferred result
Liberal	Stephen Patterson	13,998	60.5	+2.6
Labor	Mark Siebentritt	9,151	39.5	−2.6
Liberal hold		Swing	+2.6	

=== Mount Gambier ===
2018 South Australian state election: Mount Gambier
Party	Candidate	Votes	%	±%
Independent	Troy Bell	8,314	38.7	+38.7
Liberal	Craig Marsh	5,163	24.0	−27.7
SA Best	Kate Amoroso	3,385	15.8	+15.8
Labor	Isabel Scriven	2,118	9.9	−1.0
Independent	Richard Sage	1,250	5.8	+5.8
Greens	Gavin Clarke	665	3.1	−1.7
Conservatives	Gregg Bisset	464	2.2	−2.9
Dignity	Lance Jones	121	0.6	+0.6
Total formal votes		21,480	94.4	−2.8
Informal votes		1,266	5.6	+2.8
Turnout		22,746	91.8	+2.5
Two-party-preferred result
Liberal	Craig Marsh	14,705	68.5	−2.9
Labor	Isabel Scriven	6,775	31.5	+2.9
Two-candidate-preferred result
Independent	Troy Bell	12,946	60.3	+60.3
Liberal	Craig Marsh	8,534	39.7	−31.7
Independent gain from Liberal				

=== Narungga ===
2018 South Australian state election: Narungga
Party	Candidate	Votes	%	±%
Liberal	Fraser Ellis	10,269	46.5	−7.0
SA Best	Sam Davies	5,378	24.3	+24.3
Labor	Douglas Milera	3,734	16.9	−9.6
Conservatives	Rebecca Hewett	2,012	9.1	+1.9
Greens	Jason Swales	700	3.2	+0.3
Total formal votes		22,093	95.9	−0.5
Informal votes		937	4.1	+0.5
Turnout		23,030	93.6	+0.5
Two-party-preferred result
Liberal	Fraser Ellis	14,883	67.4	+3.3
Labor	Douglas Milera	7,210	32.6	−3.3
Two-candidate-preferred result
Liberal	Fraser Ellis	13,136	59.5	−4.6
SA Best	Sam Davies	8,957	40.5	+40.5
Liberal hold				

=== Newland ===
2018 South Australian state election: Newland
Party	Candidate	Votes	%	±%
Liberal	Richard Harvey	8,376	36.6	−6.6
Labor	Tom Kenyon	7,770	34.0	−7.1
SA Best	Rajini Vasan	3,730	16.3	+16.3
Greens	Stephanie Stewart	1,274	5.6	−2.0
Conservatives	Martin Leedham	1,011	4.4	−3.8
Dignity	Sandra Williams	366	1.6	+1.6
Independent	Shane Bailey	354	1.5	+1.5
Total formal votes		22,881	95.6	−1.5
Informal votes		1,050	4.4	+1.5
Turnout		23,931	92.4	+1.0
Two-party-preferred result
Liberal	Richard Harvey	11,888	52.0	+1.8
Labor	Tom Kenyon	10,993	48.0	−1.8
Liberal hold		Swing	+1.8	

=== Playford ===
2018 South Australian state election: Playford
Party	Candidate	Votes	%	±%
Labor	Michael Brown	10,551	47.2	−4.9
Liberal	Hemant Dave	4,679	20.9	−10.4
SA Best	Helen Szuty	4,455	19.9	+19.9
Greens	Brock Le Cerf	1,346	6.0	−1.1
Conservatives	Shane Sheoran	1,325	5.9	−3.5
Total formal votes		22,356	95.0	−1.0
Informal votes		1,175	5.0	+1.0
Turnout		23,531	89.2	+2.8
Two-party-preferred result
Labor	Michael Brown	14,827	66.3	+4.6
Liberal	Hemant Dave	7,529	33.7	−4.6
Labor hold		Swing	+4.6	

=== Port Adelaide ===
2018 South Australian state election: Port Adelaide
Party	Candidate	Votes	%	±%
Labor	Susan Close	11,396	47.9	−3.1
Liberal	Chad McLaren	4,432	18.6	−9.2
SA Best	Gary Johanson	4,419	18.6	+18.6
Greens	Danica Moors	1,400	5.9	−4.0
Animal Justice	Nicholas Hancock	930	3.9	+3.9
Dignity	Bryan Tingey	568	2.4	+2.4
Conservatives	Bruce Hambour	495	2.1	−3.7
Danig	Peter Matthews	163	0.7	+0.7
Total formal votes		23,803	94.2	−2.2
Informal votes		1,462	5.8	+2.2
Turnout		25,265	90.6	+5.1
Two-party-preferred result
Labor	Susan Close	15,895	66.8	+2.8
Liberal	Chad McLaren	7,908	33.2	−2.8
Two-candidate-preferred result
Labor	Susan Close	14,550	61.1	−2.9
SA Best	Gary Johanson	9,253	38.9	+38.9
Labor hold				

=== Ramsay ===
2018 South Australian state election: Ramsay
Party	Candidate	Votes	%	±%
Labor	Zoe Bettison	11,055	49.6	−6.0
SA Best	Tarnia George	4,090	18.3	+18.3
Liberal	Nick Charles	3,605	16.2	−9.3
Independent	Mark Aldridge	1,539	6.9	+6.9
Greens	Brett Ferris	1,082	4.9	−2.6
Conservatives	Domenico Ialeggio	936	4.2	−7.3
Total formal votes		22,307	93.6	−1.8
Informal votes		1,528	6.4	+1.8
Turnout		23,835	88.9	+3.3
Two-party-preferred result
Labor	Zoe Bettison	15,374	68.9	+1.2
Liberal	Nick Charles	6,933	31.1	−1.2
Two-candidate-preferred result
Labor	Zoe Bettison	14,600	65.5	−2.3
SA Best	Tarnia George	7,707	34.5	+34.5
Labor hold				

=== Reynell ===
2018 South Australian state election: Reynell
Party	Candidate	Votes	%	±%
Labor	Katrine Hildyard	9,784	47.0	−2.1
Liberal	Laura Curran	4,452	21.4	−8.1
SA Best	Joanne Mausolf	3,679	17.7	+17.7
Greens	Daniel Jury	1,357	6.5	−2.3
Conservatives	David Sires	860	4.1	−5.0
Dignity	Anna Tree	682	3.3	+3.3
Total formal votes		20,814	94.2	−1.5
Informal votes		1,281	5.8	+1.5
Turnout		22,095	89.0	+2.7
Two-party-preferred result
Labor	Katrine Hildyard	13,427	64.5	+3.4
Liberal	Laura Curran	7,387	35.5	−3.4
Labor hold		Swing	+3.4	

=== Schubert ===
2018 South Australian state election: Schubert
Party	Candidate	Votes	%	±%
Liberal	Stephan Knoll	11,203	47.9	−4.4
Labor	David Haebich	5,199	22.2	−4.4
SA Best	Paul Brown	4,577	19.6	+19.6
Greens	Dave Irving	1,222	5.2	−4.2
Conservatives	Rikki Lambert	1,183	5.1	−6.5
Total formal votes		23,384	96.4	−0.7
Informal votes		879	3.6	+0.7
Turnout		24,263	94.3	+3.5
Two-party-preferred result
Liberal	Stephan Knoll	15,042	64.3	+2.0
Labor	David Haebich	8,342	35.7	−2.0
Liberal hold		Swing	+2.0	

=== Stuart ===
2018 South Australian state election: Stuart
Party	Candidate	Votes	%	±%
Liberal	Dan van Holst Pellekaan	14,157	69.7	+5.5
Labor	Khatija Thomas	4,698	23.1	+0.0
Greens	Brendan Fitzgerald	1,460	7.2	+2.4
Total formal votes		20,315	96.9	−0.6
Informal votes		646	3.1	+0.6
Turnout		20,961	89.5	−2.1
Two-party-preferred result
Liberal	Dan van Holst Pellekaan	14,847	73.1	+3.0
Labor	Khatija Thomas	5,468	26.9	−3.0
Liberal hold		Swing	+3.0	

=== Taylor ===
2018 South Australian state election: Taylor
Party	Candidate	Votes	%	±%
Labor	Jon Gee	9,786	43.6	−4.3
SA Best	Sonja Taylor	5,644	25.1	+25.1
Liberal	Sarika Sharma	4,308	19.2	−13.0
Greens	Kate Randell	1,491	6.6	−0.5
Conservatives	Danny Bradley	1,239	5.5	−6.4
Total formal votes		22,468	94.3	−1.4
Informal votes		1,358	5.7	+1.4
Turnout		23,826	86.7	+4.6
Two-party-preferred result
Labor	Jon Gee	13,660	60.8	+2.3
Liberal	Sarika Sharma	8,808	39.2	−2.3
Two-candidate-preferred result
Labor	Jon Gee	12,516	55.7	−2.8
SA Best	Sonja Taylor	9,952	44.3	+44.3
Labor hold				

=== Torrens ===
2018 South Australian state election: Torrens
Party	Candidate	Votes	%	±%
Labor	Dana Wortley	9,981	45.9	+3.3
Liberal	Therese Kenny	8,817	40.5	−0.4
Greens	Alex Dinovitser	1,668	7.7	−1.7
Dignity	John Duthie	1,289	5.9	+5.5
Total formal votes		21,755	95.8	−0.8
Informal votes		946	4.2	+0.8
Turnout		22,701	90.4	+2.8
Two-party-preferred result
Labor	Dana Wortley	11,872	54.6	+2.1
Liberal	Therese Kenny	9,883	45.4	−2.1
Labor hold		Swing	+2.1	

=== Unley ===
2018 South Australian state election: Unley
Party	Candidate	Votes	%	±%
Liberal	David Pisoni	12,103	51.7	−3.3
Labor	Geoff Phillips	5,382	23.0	−6.7
SA Best	Anthony Olivier	2,878	12.3	+12.3
Greens	John Wishart	2,222	9.5	−2.0
Dignity	Anne Watkins	558	2.4	−1.3
Stop Population Growth Now	Dario Centrella	284	1.2	+1.2
Total formal votes		23,427	97.5	−0.6
Informal votes		593	2.5	+0.6
Turnout		24,020	91.6	+2.0
Two-party-preferred result
Liberal	David Pisoni	14,355	61.3	+2.4
Labor	Geoff Phillips	9,072	38.7	−2.4
Liberal hold		Swing	+2.4	

=== Waite ===
2018 South Australian state election: Waite
Party	Candidate	Votes	%	±%
Liberal	Sam Duluk	11,115	45.2	−8.0
Labor	Catherine Hutchesson	5,783	23.5	−2.6
SA Best	Graham Davies	3,870	15.7	+15.7
Greens	Brendan White	2,607	10.6	−5.0
Conservatives	John Duncan	677	2.8	−1.0
Dignity	Cathi Tucker	533	2.2	+0.9
Total formal votes		24,585	97.6	−0.3
Informal votes		596	2.4	+0.3
Turnout		25,181	92.7	+2.3
Two-party-preferred result
Liberal	Sam Duluk	14,211	57.8	−2.3
Labor	Catherine Hutchesson	10,374	42.2	+2.3
Liberal hold		Swing	−2.3	

=== West Torrens ===
2018 South Australian state election: West Torrens
Party	Candidate	Votes	%	±%
Labor	Tom Koutsantonis	11,147	50.3	−0.3
Liberal	Helika Cruz	7,082	32.0	−1.5
Greens	Livio Forza	2,563	11.6	−0.1
Dignity	Phillip Beddall	1,100	5.0	+5.0
Danig	Josh Dimas	270	1.2	+1.2
Total formal votes		22,162	95.5	−1.2
Informal votes		1,037	4.5	+1.2
Turnout		23,199	90.0	+3.7
Two-party-preferred result
Labor	Tom Koutsantonis	14,010	63.2	+0.9
Liberal	Helika Cruz	8,152	36.8	−0.9
Labor hold		Swing	+0.9	

=== Wright ===
2018 South Australian state election: Wright
Party	Candidate	Votes	%	±%
Labor	Blair Boyer	9,449	39.6	−5.1
Liberal	Luigi Mesisca	7,407	31.0	−7.1
SA Best	Natasha Henningsen	4,437	18.6	+18.6
Greens	Jennifer Harness	1,412	5.9	−1.2
Conservatives	Eric Dennis	1,153	4.8	−3.6
Total formal votes		23,858	95.9	−0.3
Informal votes		1,024	4.1	+0.3
Turnout		24,882	92.2	+4.0
Two-party-preferred result
Labor	Blair Boyer	12,767	53.5	−0.8
Liberal	Luigi Mesisca	11,091	46.5	+0.8
Labor hold		Swing	−0.8	

== Gallery ==
Vote strength of SA-Best party at the 2018 state election. Darker shades indicate stronger performances in the House of Assembly.

Vote strength of the Australian Conservatives (SA) party at the 2018 state election. Darker shades of light blue indicate stronger performances in the House of Assembly.

== See also ==
- Candidates of the 2018 South Australian state election
- Members of the South Australian House of Assembly, 2018–2022
