= Candidates of the 2018 South Australian state election =

This is a list of candidates of the 2018 South Australian state election. The election was held on 17 March 2018.

== Retiring MPs ==
=== Labor ===
- Michael Atkinson MHA (Croydon)
- Paul Caica MHA (Colton)
- Steph Key MHA (Ashford)
- Jennifer Rankine MHA (Wright)
- Jack Snelling MHA (Playford)
- Leesa Vlahos MHA (Taylor)
- Gail Gago MLC
- John Gazzola MLC

=== Liberal ===
- Mark Goldsworthy MHA (Kavel)
- Steven Griffiths MHA (Goyder)
- Michael Pengilly MHA (Finniss)
- Isobel Redmond MHA (Heysen)
- Mitch Williams MHA (MacKillop)

=== Independent ===
- Martin Hamilton-Smith MHA (Waite)

== House of Assembly ==
Sitting members of the South Australian House of Assembly are shown in bold text. Successful candidates are highlighted in the relevant colour; where there is possible confusion, an asterisk is used.

Electorate	Held by	Labor candidate	Liberal candidate	SA-BEST candidate	Greens candidate	Conservatives candidate	Dignity candidate	Other candidates
Adelaide	Liberal	Jo Chapley	**Rachel Sanderson**		Robert Simms		Betty-Jean Price	
Badcoe	Labor	Jayne Stinson	Lachlan Clyne	Kate Bickford	Stef Rozitis	Robyn Munro	Lily Durkin	John Woodward (Ind)
Black	Liberal	Randall Wilson	**David Speirs**		Dami Barnes	Lionel Zschech	Anastasia Svetlichny	Rob de Jonge (Ind)
Bragg	Liberal	Rick Sarre	**Vickie Chapman**		Neil Zwaans		Taylah Neagle	
Chaffey	Liberal	Sim Singh-Malhi	**Tim Whetstone**	Michelle Campbell	Philip Pointer	Trevor Scott	Richard Challis	
Cheltenham	Labor	**Jay Weatherill**	Penny Pratt	John Noonan	Steffi Medrow		Madeline McCaul	Vincent Scali (Ind)
Colton	Liberal	Angela Vaughan	Matt Cowdrey	Jassmine Wood	Paul Petherick		Ted Evans	
Croydon	Labor	Peter Malinauskas	Daria Hextell	Julia Karpathakis	Nathan Lange	Rachael Runner	Lucy McGinley	Gabor Gesti (DPA); Millie Hammerstein (AJP); Michael Lesiw (Ind)
Davenport	Liberal	Jonette Thorsteinsen	Steve Murray	Karen Hockley	John Photakis			Dan Golding (Ind)
Dunstan	Liberal	Matt Loader	**Steven Marshall**	Jack Noonan	Harriet de Kok		Ben Wilson	
Elder	Liberal	**Annabel Digance**	Carolyn Habib	Michael Slattery	Jody Moate	Shawn Van Groesen	Nick Schumi	
Elizabeth	Labor	**Lee Odenwalder**	Sharka Byrne	Phil Gallasch	Wendy Morgan	John Mathiesen		
Enfield	Labor	**John Rau**	Deepa Mathew	Carol Martin	Cassie Alvey	Steve Edmonds	Emma Cresdee	
Finniss	Liberal	Russell Skinner	David Basham	Joe Hill	Marc Mullette	Bruce Hicks		
Flinders	Liberal	Julie Watson	**Peter Treloar**		Ian Dudley	Anthony Parker		
Florey	Labor	Rik Morris	Gagan Sharma		Adam Gatt	John Peake	Suzi Waechter	**Frances Bedford*** (Ind); Geoff Russell (AJP)
Frome	Independent	Annette Elliot	Kendall Jackson		Paul Birkwood		Cat Connor	**Geoff Brock** (Ind)
Gibson	Liberal	Matthew Carey	**Corey Wingard**	Kris Hanna	Gwydion Rozitisolds		Garry Connor	
Giles	Labor	**Eddie Hughes**	Mark Walsh	Tom Antonio	Anna Taylor	Cheryl Kaminski	Cyanne Westerman	
Hammond	Liberal	Mat O'Brien	**Adrian Pederick**	Kelly Gladigau	Simon Hope	Declan Paton		
Hartley	Liberal	Grace Portolesi	**Vincent Tarzia**	Nick Xenophon	Lauren Zwaans	Bob Jackson	Rick Neagle	Marijka Ryan (Ind)
Heysen	Liberal	Tony Webb	Josh Teague	John Illingworth	Lynton Vonow	Lynette Stevenson	Andrew Ey	
Hurtle Vale	Labor	**Nat Cook**	Aaron Duff	Michael O'Brien	Nikki Mortier	Bruce Malcolm	Donovan Cresdee	
Kaurna	Labor	**Chris Picton**	Simon McMahon		Sean Cullen-MacAskill			
Kavel	Liberal	Glen Dallimore	Dan Cregan	Andrew Stratford	Ian Grosser	Howard Hollow	Cristina Rodert	Louise Pfeiffer (AJP)
King	Labor	Julie Duncan	Paula Luethen	Giles Rositano	Damon Adams	Gary Balfort		
Lee	Labor	**Stephen Mullighan**	Steven Rypp	Andy Legrand	Patrick O'Sullivan	Vicki Jessop	Tiffany Littler	Aristidis Kerpelis (DPA)
Light	Labor	**Tony Piccolo**	Karen McColl		Felicity Green	Carl Teusner		
MacKillop	Liberal	Hilary Wigg	Nick McBride	Tracy Hill	Donella Peters	Richard Bateman		Jon Ey (Ind)
Mawson	Liberal	**Leon Bignell**	Andy Gilfillan	Hazel Wainwright	Ami-Louise Harrison	Heidi Greaves		
Morialta	Liberal	Peter Field	**John Gardner**	James Sadler	Simon Roberts-Thomson	Matt Smith	Tim Farrow	Peter Smythe (Ind)
Morphett	Liberal	Mark Siebentritt	Stephen Patterson	Simon Jones	Chris Crabbe		Monica Kwan	**Duncan McFetridge** (Ind)
Mount Gambier	Liberal	Isabel Scriven	Craig Marsh	Kate Amoroso	Gavin Clarke	Gregg Bisset	Lance Jones	**Troy Bell*** (Ind); Richard Sage (Ind)
Narungga	Liberal	Douglas Milera	Fraser Ellis	Sam Davies	Jason Swales	Rebecca Hewett		
Newland	Liberal	**Tom Kenyon**	Richard Harvey	Rajini Vasan	Stephanie Stewart	Martin Leedham	Sandra Williams	Shane Bailey (Ind)
Playford	Labor	Michael Brown	Hemant Dave	Helen Szuty	Brock Le Cerf	Shane Sheoran		
Port Adelaide	Labor	**Susan Close**	Chad McLaren	Gary Johanson	Danica Moors	Bruce Hambour	Bryan Tingey	Nicholas Hancock (AJP); Peter Matthews (DPA)
Ramsay	Labor	**Zoe Bettison**	Nick Charles	Tarnia George	Brett Ferris	Domenico Ialeggio		Mark Aldridge (Ind)
Reynell	Labor	**Katrine Hildyard**	Laura Curran	Joanne Mausolf	Daniel Jury	David Sires	Anna Tree	
Schubert	Liberal	David Haebich	**Stephan Knoll**	Paul Brown	Dave Irving	Rikki Lambert		
Stuart	Liberal	Khatija Thomas	**Dan van Holst Pellekaan**		Brendan Fitzgerald			
Taylor	Labor	**Jon Gee**	Sarika Sharma	Sonja Taylor	Kate Randell	Danny Bradley		
Torrens	Labor	**Dana Wortley**	Therese Kenny		Alex Dinovitser		John Duthie	
Unley	Liberal	Geoff Phillips	**David Pisoni**	Anthony Olivier	John Wishart		Anne Watkins	Dario Centrella (SPGN)
Waite	Liberal	Catherine Hutchesson	**Sam Duluk**	Graham Davies	Brendan White	John Duncan	Cathi Tucker	
West Torrens	Labor	**Tom Koutsantonis**	Helika Cruz		Livio Forza		Phillip Beddall	Josh Dimas (DPA)
Wright	Labor	Blair Boyer	Luigi Mesisca	Natasha Henningsen	Jennifer Harness	Eric Dennis		

== Legislative Council ==
Sitting members of the South Australian Legislative Council are shown in bold text. Tickets that elected at least one member are highlighted in the relevant colour and successful candidates are indicated with an asterisk (*). Eleven of twenty-two seats were up for election. The Labor Party was defending four seats. The Liberals was defending four seats. The Greens, Australian Conservatives (who absorbed Family First since the last election) and Dignity Party were each defending one seat.

Labor candidates	Liberal candidates	SA Best candidates	Greens candidates	Conservatives candidates	Dignity candidates
1. Emily Bourke*; 2. **Justin Hanson***; 3. Irene Pnevmatikos*; 4. Clare Scriven*; 5. Trimann Gill; 6. Christina Lien	1. **David Ridgway***; 2. **Stephen Wade***; 3. **Terry Stephens***; 4. **Jing Lee***; 5. Bernadette Abraham; 6. Clementina Maione	1. Connie Bonaros*; 2. Frank Pangallo*; 3. Sam Johnson; 4. Andrea Madeley; 5. Peter Vincent	1. **Tammy Franks***; 2. Matt Farrell; 3. Ashley Sutherland; 4. Rosa Hillam; 5. Kate Wylie	1. **Robert Brokenshire**; 2. Nicolle Jachmann	1. **Kelly Vincent**; 2. Diana Bleby; 3. Ryan Mann; 4. Esther Simbi
Advance SA candidates	AJP candidates	LDP candidates	SPGN candidates	CPP candidates	Group L candidates
1. Peter Humphries; 2. Jenny Low	1. Angela Martin; 2. Wendy Davey	1. Michael Noack; 2. Stephen Humble	1. Bob Couch; 2. Michael Roberts	1. Tony Tonkin; 2. Nadia Bergineti	1. Amrik Singh Thandi; 2. MJ Thandi
Ungrouped candidates					
Gail Kilby (Ind); John Le Raye (DPA); Luke Koumi (Ind)					

== See also ==
- Candidates of the South Australian state election, 2014
