= Members of the South Australian Legislative Council, 2018–2022 =

Members of the South Australian Legislative Council, 2018–2022

This is a list of members of the South Australian Legislative Council between 2018 and 2022. As half of the Legislative Council's terms expired at each state election, half of these members were elected at the 2014 state election with terms expiring in 2022, while the other half were elected at the 2018 state election with terms expiring in 2026.

Name	Party	Term expires	Term of office
Connie Bonaros	SA Best	2026	2018–present
Emily Bourke	Labor	2026	2018–present
Nicola Centofanti ^{[2]}	Liberal	2022	2020–present
John Darley	Advance SA	2022	2007–2022
John Dawkins	Liberal/Independent ^{[3]}	2022	1997–2022
Tammy Franks	Greens	2026	2010–present
Heidi Girolamo ^{[5]}	Liberal	2026	2021–present
Justin Hanson	Labor	2026	2017–present
Dennis Hood	Conservatives/Liberal ^{[1]}	2022	2006–present
Ian Hunter	Labor	2022	2006–present
Jing Lee	Liberal	2026	2010–present
Michelle Lensink	Liberal	2022	2003–present
Rob Lucas	Liberal	2022	1982–2022
Kyam Maher	Labor	2022	2012–present
Andrew McLachlan ^{[2]}	Liberal	2022	2014–2020
Tung Ngo	Labor	2022	2014–present
Frank Pangallo	SA Best	2026	2018–present
Mark Parnell ^{[4]}	Greens	2022	2006–2021
Irene Pnevmatikos	Labor	2026	2018–2023
David Ridgway ^{[5]}	Liberal	2026	2002–2021
Clare Scriven	Labor	2026	2018–present
Robert Simms ^{[4]}	Greens	2022	2021–present
Terry Stephens	Liberal	2026	2002–present
Stephen Wade	Liberal	2026	2006–2023
Russell Wortley	Labor	2022	2006–present

^{1} Australian Conservatives MLC Dennis Hood, who had been elected as a Family First Party MLC in 2014, defected to the Liberal Party nine days after the 2018 state election.
^{2} Liberal MLC Andrew McLachlan resigned on 6 February 2020 to take up an appointment to the Australian Senate. Nicola Centofanti was appointed to replace him on 7 April 2020.
^{3} Liberal MLC John Dawkins was expelled from the Liberal Party in 2020 after successfully running against the party's nominee for Legislative Council President. This was against the party's rules.
^{4} Greens MLC Mark Parnell resigned on 1 April 2021. Robert Simms was appointed to replace him on 4 May 2021.
^{5} Liberal MLC David Ridgway resigned on 30 June 2021. Heidi Girolamo was appointed to replace him on 24 August 2021.

== See also ==
- Members of the South Australian House of Assembly, 2018–2022
