= Members of the South Australian House of Assembly, 2018–2022 =

This is a list of members of the South Australian House of Assembly from 2018 to 2022, as elected at the 2018 state election and subsequent by-elections.

Name	Party	Electorate	Term of office
David Basham	Liberal	Finniss	2018–2026
Frances Bedford	Independent	Florey	1997–2022
Troy Bell	Independent	Mount Gambier	2014–2025
Zoe Bettison	Labor	Ramsay	2012–present
Leon Bignell	Labor	Mawson	2006–2026
Blair Boyer	Labor	Wright	2018–present
Geoff Brock	Independent	Frome	2009–present
Michael Brown	Labor	Playford	2018–present
Vickie Chapman	Liberal	Bragg	2002–2022
Susan Close	Labor	Port Adelaide	2012–2026
Nat Cook	Labor	Hurtle Vale	2014–present
Matt Cowdrey	Liberal	Colton	2018–2026
Dan Cregan	Liberal/Independent (Note: On 8 October 2021, Kavel MP Dan Cregan resigned from the Liberal Party. He sat as an independent for the remainder of his term.)	Kavel	2018–2026
Sam Duluk	Liberal/Independent (Note: On 14 February 2020, Waite MP Sam Duluk was suspended from the parliamentary Liberal Party. He sat as an independent for the remainder of his term.)	Waite	2015–2022
Fraser Ellis	Liberal/Independent (Note: On 18 February 2021, Narungga MP Fraser Ellis suspended his membership of the parliamentary Liberal Party. He sat as an independent for the remainder of his term.)	Narungga	2018–2026
John Gardner	Liberal	Morialta	2010–2026
Jon Gee	Labor	Taylor	2014–2022
Richard Harvey	Liberal	Newland	2018–2022
Katrine Hildyard	Labor	Reynell	2014–present
Eddie Hughes	Labor	Giles	2014–present
Stephan Knoll	Liberal	Schubert	2014–2022
Tom Koutsantonis	Labor	West Torrens	1997–present
Paula Luethen	Liberal	King	2018–2022
Peter Malinauskas	Labor	Croydon	2018–present
Steven Marshall	Liberal	Dunstan	2010–2024
Nick McBride	Liberal	MacKillop	2018–2026
Andrea Michaels (Note: On 17 December 2018, Labor MPs Jay Weatherill and John Rau resigned. By-elections were held for their respective seats of Cheltenham and Enfield on 9 February 2019. Joe Szakacs was elected for Cheltenham and Andrea Michaels for Enfield.)	Labor	Enfield	2019–2026
Stephen Mullighan	Labor	Lee	2014–2026
Steve Murray	Liberal	Davenport	2018–2022
Lee Odenwalder	Labor	Elizabeth	2010–2026
Stephen Patterson	Liberal	Morphett	2018–2026
Adrian Pederick	Liberal	Hammond	2006–2026
Tony Piccolo	Labor	Light	2006–2026
Chris Picton	Labor	Kaurna	2014–present
David Pisoni	Liberal	Unley	2006–2026
Carolyn Power	Liberal	Elder	2018–2022
John Rau	Labor	Enfield	2002–2018
Rachel Sanderson	Liberal	Adelaide	2010–2022
David Speirs	Liberal	Black	2014–2024
Jayne Stinson	Labor	Badcoe	2018–present
Joe Szakacs	Labor	Cheltenham	2019–present
Vincent Tarzia	Liberal	Hartley	2014–2026
Josh Teague	Liberal	Heysen	2018–present
Peter Treloar	Liberal	Flinders	2010–2022
Dan van Holst Pellekaan	Liberal	Stuart	2010–2022
Jay Weatherill	Labor	Cheltenham	2002–2018
Tim Whetstone	Liberal	Chaffey	2010–present
Corey Wingard	Liberal	Gibson	2014–2022
Dana Wortley	Labor	Torrens	2014–2026

== See also ==
- Members of the South Australian Legislative Council, 2018–2022
