= 2018 South Australian state election =

- 17 March 2018

All 47 seats in the South Australian House of Assembly 24 seats were needed for a majority 11 (of the 22) seats in the South Australian Legislative Council
- Opinion polls
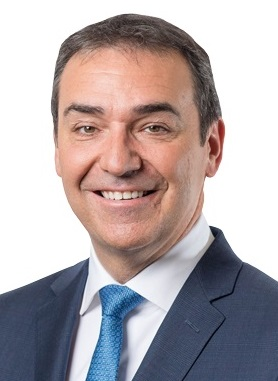

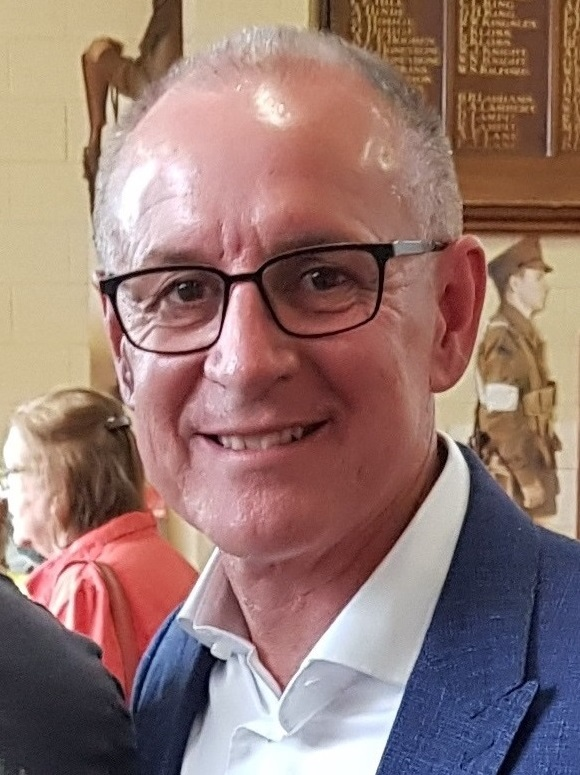

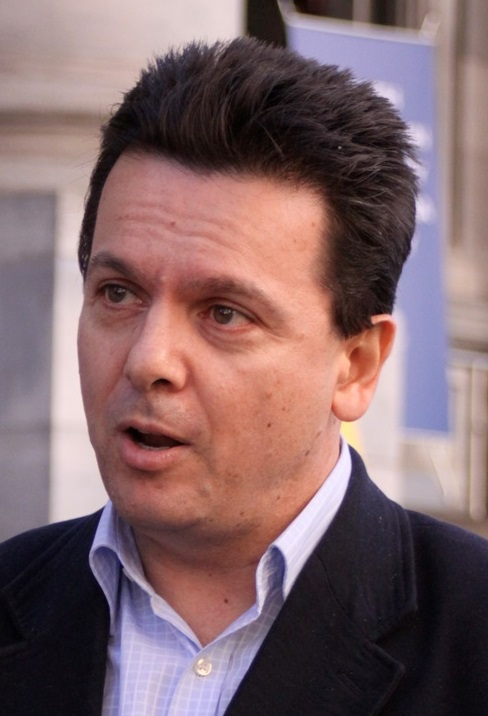
	First party	Second party	Third party
Leader	Steven Marshall	Jay Weatherill	Nick Xenophon
Party	Liberal	Labor	SA Best
Leader since	4 February 2013	21 October 2011	4 July 2017
Leader's seat	Dunstan	Cheltenham	Ran in Hartley (lost)
Last election	22 seats	23 seats	Did not exist
Seats won	25	19	0
Seat change	▲3	▼4	Steady
Primary vote	398,182	343,896	148,360
Percentage	37.97%	32.79%	14.15%
Swing	▼6.81	▼3.01	New party
TPP	51.94%	48.06%
TPP swing	▼1.07	▲1.07
Premier before election
Jay Weatherill
Labor
Elected Premier
Steven Marshall
Liberal

The 2018 South Australian state election to elect members to the 54th Parliament of South Australia was held on 17 March 2018. All 47 seats in the House of Assembly or lower house, whose members were elected at the 2014 election, and 11 of 22 seats in the Legislative Council or upper house, last filled at the 2010 election, were contested. The record-16-year-incumbent Labor Party government led by Premier Jay Weatherill was seeking a fifth four-year term, but was defeated by the opposition Liberal Party, led by opposition leader Steven Marshall.

Nick Xenophon's new SA Best party unsuccessfully sought to obtain the balance of power in the Lower House. The party came second on primary votes in ten seats; the strongest results were in Chaffey, Finniss, and Hartley, where the party received over 25%. However, SA Best received 19.3% of the votes in the Upper House, securing two seats and joining The Greens on the crossbench.

Like federal elections, South Australia has compulsory voting, uses full-preference instant-runoff voting for single-member electorates in the lower house and optional preference single transferable voting in the proportionally represented upper house. The election was conducted by the Electoral Commission of South Australia (ECSA), an independent body answerable to Parliament.

== Results ==
=== House of Assembly ===
Winning party by electorate.

Government Liberal (25) Opposition Labor (19) Crossbench Independent (3) (Note: Independent MPs: Frances Bedford (Florey), Troy Bell (Mount Gambier) and Geoff Brock (Frome))

South Australian state election, 17 March 2018 House of Assembly << 2014–2022 >>
Enrolled voters	1,201,775				
Votes cast	1,093,584		Turnout	91.00	▼ –0.94
Informal votes	44,871		Informal	4.10	▲ +1.01
Summary of votes by party
Party	Primary votes	%	Swing	Seats	Change
Liberal	398,182	38.0	▼ –6.81	25	▲ +3
Labor	343,896	32.8	▼ –3.01	19	▼ –4
SA Best	148,360	14.2	New	0	0
Greens	69,826	6.7	▼ –2.1	0	0
Independents	36,780	3.5	▼ –0.2	3	▲ +1
Conservatives	31,826	3.0	▼ –3.2	0	0
Dignity	15,565	1.5	▲ +0.9	0	0
Animal Justice	3,262	0.3	New	0	0
Danig	732	0.1	New	0	0
Stop Population Growth Now	284	0.0	▲ +0.0	0	0
Total	1,048,713			47	
Two-party-preferred
Liberal	544,654	51.9	▼ –1.1		
Labor	504,059	48.1	▲ +1.1		

Popular vote
Liberal	37.97%
Labor	32.79%
SA Best	14.15%
Greens	6.66%
Independents	3.51%
Conservatives	3.03%
Dignity	1.48%
Others	0.41%

Two-party-preferred vote
Liberal	51.94%
Labor	48.06%

Seats
Liberal	53.19%
Labor	40.43%
Independents	6.38%

==== Seats changing hands ====
Seat	Pre-election			Swing	Post-election		
Seat	Party	Member	Margin*	Swing	Margin	Member	Party
Florey	Labor	Frances Bedford	9.1	15.2	6.1	Frances Bedford	Independent
King	Labor	vacant – new seat	<0.1	0.7	0.7	Paula Luethen	Liberal
Mount Gambier	Liberal	Troy Bell	21.4	31.7	10.3	Troy Bell	Independent
^{1} Frances Bedford resigned from Labor in March 2017 to sit as an independent, after she failed to gain preselection.^{2} Troy Bell resigned from the Liberals in August 2017 to sit as an independent, after he was charged by the state ICAC. * Notional margins were calculated by the ABC's election analyst Antony Green.

==== Party-redistributed seats ====
Seat	2014 election			2016 redistribution		Swing	2018 election		
Seat	Party	Member	Margin	Party	Margin*	Swing	Margin	Member	Party
Colton	Labor	Paul Caica	1.5	Liberal	3.9	4.0	7.9	Matt Cowdrey	Liberal
Elder	Labor	Annabel Digance	1.8	Liberal	4.1	0.3	4.4	Carolyn Habib	Liberal
Mawson	Labor	Leon Bignell	4.6	Liberal	4.2	4.5	0.3	Leon Bignell	Labor
Newland	Labor	Tom Kenyon	1.4	Liberal	0.2	1.7	2.0	Richard Harvey	Liberal
* Notional margins were calculated by the ABC's election analyst Antony Green.

The seats of Colton, Elder, Mawson and Newland were won by Labor at the previous election, but the 2016 redistribution made them notionally Liberal seats. Colton, Elder and Newland were won by the Liberals; Mawson was retained by Labor.

=== Legislative Council ===
Government Liberal (9) Opposition Labor (8) Crossbench SA Best (2) Greens (2) Advance SA (1)

South Australian state election, 17 March 2018 Legislative Council << 2014–2022 >>
Enrolled voters	1,201,775				
Votes cast	1,093,584		Turnout	91.00	▼ –1.1
Informal votes	44,497		Informal	4.06	▲ +0.1
Summary of votes by party
Party	Primary votes	%	Swing	Seats won	Seats held
Liberal	338,700	32.23	▼ –3.8	4	9
Labor	304,229	28.95	▼ –2.0	4	8
SA Best	203,364	19.35	▲ +19.35	2	2
Greens	61,610	5.86	▼ –0.6	1	2
Conservatives	36,525	3.48	▼ –0.9	0	0
Liberal Democrats	25,956	2.47	▲ +1.9	0	0
Animal Justice	22,822	2.17	▲ +1.3	0	0
Dignity	20,337	1.93	▲ +1.0	0	0
Child Protection	15,530	1.48	▲ +1.5	0	0
Stop Population Growth Now	12,878	1.22	▲ +0.8	0	0
Independents	4,602	0.40	▼ –1.3	0	0
Advance SA	4,227	0.44	▲ +0.4	0	1
Danig	94	0.00	▲ +0.0	0	0
Total	1,050,874			11	22

== Aftermath ==
Four hours after the close of polls, at approximately 10pm ACDT, incumbent Premier Jay Weatherill telephoned Steven Marshall and conceded defeat. Weatherill subsequently publicly announced that he had conceded, saying, "I'm sorry I couldn't bring home another victory, but I do feel like one of those horses that has won four Melbourne Cups and I think the handicap has caught up with us on this occasion." Marshall claimed victory saying, "A massive thank you to the people of South Australia who have put their trust, their faith in me and the Liberal team for a new dawn, a new dawn for South Australia!" After the SA Best party failed to win a seat in the lower house, Nick Xenophon ruled out a return to federal politics.

Following the election outcome, Weatherill resigned as state Labor leader and returned to the backbench. Outgoing Minister for Health Peter Malinauskas became Leader of the Opposition, with outgoing Education Minister Susan Close as deputy, following a Labor caucus meeting on 9 April 2018.

Notably, the Liberals won 16 of the 33 metropolitan seats, their best showing in the Adelaide area since their landslide victory in 1993, when they took all but nine seats in the capital. Labor had spent all but 12 of the 48 years since the end of the Playmander in government due to its traditional dominance of Adelaide. South Australia is one of the most centralised states in Australia; Adelaide is home to over three-quarters of the state's population. To a greater extent than other state capitals, Adelaide is decisive in deciding state election outcomes.

Since the end of the Playmander, most elections have seen Labor win most of the metropolitan seats, with most of the Liberal vote locked up in safe rural seats. In 2010, for instance, the Liberals won 51 percent of the two-party vote on a swing that should have been large enough to deliver them government. However, they only won nine seats in Adelaide, allowing Labor to eke out a two-seat majority. In 2014, while picking up a two percent two-party swing, the Liberals were only able to win an additional three seats in Adelaide.

== New political parties ==
Two Federal Senators from South Australia, Cory Bernardi and Nick Xenophon formed new political parties which would contest the State Election.

In April 2017 Cory Bernardi's new party Australian Conservatives merged with Family First Party and its two state incumbents Dennis Hood and Robert Brokenshire joined the party. The Australian Conservatives at its first election would not win any seats. At the election, the Australian Conservatives suffered a 3.2% swing in the South Australian House of Assembly (from a Family First vote of 6.2% in 2014) for a primary vote of 3.0%. It stood 33 candidates for the lower house, none of whom came close to being elected. It suffered a swing of 0.9% swing in the Legislative Council (from a Family First vote of 4.4% in 2014) for a primary vote of 3.5%.

Nick Xenophon announced a few SA Best lower house candidates. Polls had included Xenophon's party as one of the four parties they monitored explicitly since February 2016. Originally, SA Best planned to only contest 12 seats. This was increased to 20. On 27 January, a landmark was passed when Xenophon announced eight new candidates, making a total of 24. This was the minimum number to be theoretically capable of forming majority government in the 47-seat house. On 1 February, Xenophon said it was likely the total number of SA Best lower house candidates would be around 30.

During the election Xenophon and his SA Best party pushed for a law that Ice users in South Australia will be forced into drug rehabilitation.

After early opinion polls indicated that SA Best could outperform the two main incumbent parties, the party ultimately contested 36 seats in the House of Assembly and put forward four candidates for the upper house. Opinion polling indicated a strong performance for the party was possible in at least 10 seats.

=== Key seats for SA Best ===
The table lists, according to The Poll Bludger website and based on the Nick Xenophon Team's Senate vote performance at the 2016 federal election, the strongest SA Best seats.

Seat	Party	NXT vote
Heysen	LIB	31.2%
Chaffey	LIB	30.5%
Finniss	LIB	30.4%
Kavel	LIB	29.8%
Morialta	LIB	26.9%
Giles	ALP	26.5%
Mawson	LIB (notional)	25.8%
Stuart	LIB	25.8%
Mt Gambier	LIB	25.4%
Narungga	LIB	25.0%
Hammond	LIB	24.3%
Davenport	LIB	24.2%
Newland	LIB (notional)	23.7%
Hartley	LIB	23.7%
Waite	LIB	23.5%

Though most of the listed seats are safe Liberal seats, a third party or candidate with a substantial vote was believed to be more likely to be successful in a traditionally safe seat than a marginal seat due to it being easier to out-poll the comparatively low primary vote of the seat's traditionally uncompetitive major party, usually before but occasionally after the distribution of preferences (see 2009 Frome state by-election). If the third party attracts enough first preference votes away from the dominant party, then it is possible that the preferences of voters for the second traditional party will assist the new party's candidate to overtake and therefore defeat the incumbent on the two-candidate-preferred vote (rather than the normally pivotal two-party-preferred vote). According to The Poll Bludger, Nick Xenophon's SA Best candidates "will stand an excellent chance in any seat where they are able to outpoll one or other major party, whose voters will overwhelmingly place them higher than the candidate of the rival major party. In that circumstance, the more strongly performing major party candidate will be in serious trouble unless their own primary vote approaches 50%, which will be difficult to achieve in circumstances where approaching a quarter of the vote has gone to SA Best."

Analysis in December 2017 from polling company Essential Research found SA Best preference flows of 60/40 to Liberal/Labor, indicating that the substantial third party presence of SA Best is eating in to the Liberal vote somewhat greater than the Labor vote.

Ultimately, the SA Best party failed to secure any lower house seats, although there was a close contest on preferences in the seat of Heysen, which is based in the Adelaide Hills, where the final two party result was Liberal 51.2% to SA Best 48.2%. SA Best party leader Xenophon failed to win the seat of Hartley after finishing second on first preferences with 24.9%. The seat was retained by the Liberals after Xenophon was eliminated from the 2 party count, after falling between the Labor candidate, due to the preference redistributions from the other 4 candidates which totalled about 10% of the vote. The party came second on primary votes in ten seats; the strongest results were in Chaffey, Finniss, Hartley, Heysen and Taylor where the party received over 24%.
SA Best did, however, secure two upper house positions in the South Australian Legislative Council, with the successful election of Connie Bonaros, the campaign manager, and Frank Pangallo, Xenophon's former media advisor.

Following the election, NXT Senator Stirling Griff claimed that polling indicated a 5% drop in SA Best's vote as a direct result of negative advertisements by two major parties as well as the Australian Hotels Association (AHA). He also claimed paternity for an election ad that had been described as "wacky, cheesy" and that that ad actually led to a polling bump for SA Best.

== Background ==
=== Overview ===
There were fourteen political parties registered with the Electoral Commission of South Australia at the time of the election, which were consequently eligible to field candidates for election. Aside from the major parties (Labor and Liberal parties), SA Best, which polled higher figures than the major parties on occasion, ran in 36 seats, more than the 24 theoretically required to form government. The fourteen parties registered with the Commission were Advance SA, Animal Justice Party, Australian Conservatives (SA), Child Protection Party, Danig Party of Australia, Dignity Party, the Australian Greens SA, Australian Labor Party (SA Branch) and Country Labor Party, Liberal Party of Australia (SA Division), Liberal Democratic Party, the National Party of Australia (SA) Inc, Nick Xenophon's SA-BEST, and Stop Population Growth Now. Since the previous election, six new parties had registered: Danig Party of Australia, Animal Justice Party, Nick Xenophon's SA-BEST, Australian Conservatives (SA), Advance SA and the Child Protection Party. Four were no longer registered: FREE Australia Party, Fishing and Lifestyle Party, Multicultural Progress Party and the Family First Party.

=== Voting changes ===
Like federal elections, South Australia has compulsory voting and uses full-preference instant-runoff voting for single-member electorates in the lower house. However, following similar Senate changes which took effect from the 2016 federal election, South Australia's single transferable vote in the proportionally represented upper house changed from group voting tickets to optional preferential voting − instructions for above the line votes were to mark '1' and then further preferences optional as opposed to preference flows from simply '1' above the line being determined by group voting tickets, while instructions for voters who instead opt to vote below the line were to provide at least twelve preferences as opposed to having to number all candidates, and with a savings provision to admit ballot papers which indicate at least six below-the-line preferences.

=== Previous election ===
The 2014 election resulted in a hung parliament with 23 seats for Labor and 22 for the Liberals. The balance of power rested with the two crossbench independents, Bob Such and Geoff Brock. Such did not indicate who he would support in a minority government before he went on medical leave for a brain tumour, diagnosed one week after the election. University of Adelaide Professor and Political Commentator Clem Macintyre said the absence of Such virtually guaranteed that Brock would back Labor – with 24 seats required to govern, Brock duly provided support to the incumbent Labor government, allowing Premier Jay Weatherill to continue in office as head of a minority government. Macintyre said:

If Geoff Brock had gone with the Liberals, then the Parliament would have effectively been tied 23 to 23, so once Bob Such became ill and stepped away then Geoff Brock, I think had no choice but to side with Labor.

The Liberals were reduced to 21 seats in May 2014 when Martin Hamilton-Smith became an independent and entered cabinet with Brock. Both Hamilton-Smith and Brock agreed to support the government on confidence and supply while retaining the right to otherwise vote on conscience. It is Labor's longest-serving South Australian government and the second longest-serving South Australian government behind the Playmander-assisted Thomas Playford IV. Aside from Playford, it is the second time that any party has won four consecutive state elections in South Australia, the first occurred when Don Dunstan led Labor to four consecutive victories between 1970 and 1977. Recent hung parliaments occurred when Labor came to government at the 2002 election and prior to that at the 1997 election which saw the South Australian Division of the Liberal Party of Australia, created in 1974, win re-election for the first time. Following the 2014 election, Labor went from minority to majority government when Nat Cook won the 2014 Fisher by-election by five votes from a 7.3 percent two-party swing which was triggered by the death of Such. Despite this, the Jay Weatherill Labor government kept Brock and Hamilton-Smith in cabinet, giving the government a 26 to 21 parliamentary majority. Frances Bedford resigned from Labor and became an independent in March 2017 after minister Jack Snelling was endorsed for Florey pre-selection as a result of the major electoral redistribution ahead of the 2018 election. As with the rest of the crossbench, Bedford will continue to provide confidence and supply support to the incumbent Labor government. Duncan McFetridge resigned from the Liberals and moved to the crossbench as an independent in May 2017 after Stephen Patterson was endorsed for Morphett pre-selection. Troy Bell resigned from the Liberals and moved to the crossbench as an independent in August 2017 due to criminal financial allegations.

=== By-elections ===
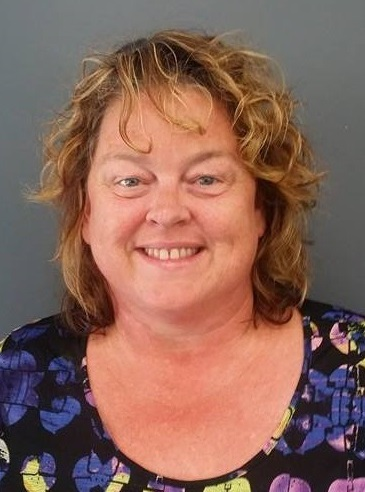
Labor candidate Nat Cook won the traditionally Liberal seat of Fisher at the December 2014 by-election by just 9 votes (Lib 10,275 LAB 10,284) after preferences from a 7.3 percent Liberal to Labor two-party swing, taking Labor from minority to majority government.

Independent Bob Such died from a brain tumour on 11 October 2014 which triggered a by-election in Fisher for 6 December. Labor's Nat Cook won the by-election by nine votes with a 7.3 percent two-party swing against the Liberals, resulting in a change from minority to majority government. On a 0.02 percent margin it is the most marginal seat in parliament. Despite this, the Weatherill Labor government kept crossbench MPs Geoff Brock and Martin Hamilton-Smith in cabinet, giving the government a 26 to 21 parliamentary majority. ABC psephologist Antony Green described the by-election as a "very bad result for the Liberal Party in South Australia" both state and federally, and that a fourth term government gaining a seat at a by-election is unprecedented in Australian history.

Liberal Iain Evans in Davenport resigned from parliament on 30 October 2014 which triggered a 2015 Davenport by-election for 31 January. Liberal Sam Duluk won the seat despite a five percent two-party swing, turning the historically safe seat of Davenport in to a two-party marginal seat for the first time. ABC psephologist Antony Green described it as "another poor result for the South Australian Liberal Party", following the 2014 Fisher by-election which saw Labor go from minority to majority government.

=== Upper house casual vacancies ===
Following the parliamentary resignation of former Labor Minister Bernard Finnigan on 12 November 2015 following his conviction for accessing child pornography. SDA secretary Peter Malinauskas filled the Legislative Council casual vacancy in a joint sitting of the Parliament of South Australia on 1 December.

Following the parliamentary resignation of Labor MLC Gerry Kandelaars on 17 February 2017, Justin Hanson filled the Legislative Council casual vacancy in a joint sitting of the Parliament of South Australia on 28 February.

=== Dates ===
The key dates for the 2018 election were:

- 17 February 2018 Issue of the writs by the Governor of South Australia
- 23 February 2018 Close of rolls (noon)
- 23 February 2018 Close of nominations for party-endorsed candidates (5pm)
- 26 February 2018 Close of nominations for independent candidates (noon)
- 26 February 2018 Declaration of candidates and draws for ballot paper order (House of Assembly)
- 27 February 2018 Declaration of candidates and draws for ballot paper order (Legislative Council)
- 5 March 2018 Pre-poll voting opens
- 17 March 2018 election day (8am–6pm)
- 24 March 2018 last day to receive postal votes
- 26–30 March 2018 Expected formal declaration of results for House of Assembly seats in this week
- Mid April 2018 Expected formal declaration of results for Legislative council

The last state election was held on 15 March 2014 to elect members for the House of Assembly and half of the members in the Legislative Council. In South Australia, section 28 of the Constitution Act 1934, as amended in 2001, directs that parliaments have fixed four-year terms, and elections must be held on the third Saturday in March every four years unless this date falls the day after Good Friday, occurs within the same month as a Commonwealth election, or the conduct of the election could be adversely affected by a state disaster. Section 28 also states that the Governor may also dissolve the Assembly and call an election for an earlier date if the Government has lost the confidence of the Assembly or a bill of special importance has been rejected by the Legislative Council. Section 41 states that both the Council and the Assembly may also be dissolved simultaneously if a deadlock occurs between them.

The Electoral (Miscellaneous) Amendment Act 2013 introduced set dates for writs for general elections in South Australia. The writ sets the dates for the close of the electoral roll and the close of nominations for an election. The Electoral Act 1985 requires that, for a general election, the writ be issued 28 days before the date fixed for polling (S47(2a)) and the electoral roll be closed at 12 noon, six days after the issue of the writ (S48(3(a)(i)). The close of nominations will be at 12 noon three days after the close of rolls (Electoral Act 1985 S48(4)(a) and S4(1)).

== Redistributions and the two-party vote ==
To produce "fair" electoral boundaries, the Electoral Commission of South Australia (ECSA) has been required following the 1989 election to redraw boundaries after each election through a "fairness clause" in the state constitution, with the objective that the party which receives over 50 percent of the statewide two-party vote at the forthcoming election should win the two-party vote in a majority of seats in terms of the two-party-preferred vote calculated in all seats regardless of any differing two-candidate-preferred vote.

The Electoral Districts Boundaries Commission released a new draft redistribution in August 2016, as calculated from the 24 Liberal−23 Labor seat count by two-party vote as recorded in all 47 seats at the 2014 state election (subsequent by-election results including the significant 2014 Fisher by-election are not counted). The net change proposed would have seen a 27 Liberal−20 Labor notional seat count.

The proposed changes in the draft redistribution contained significant boundary redrawing. Seven seats would be renamed − Ashford would become Badcoe, Mitchell would become Black, Bright would become Gibson, Fisher would become Hurtle Vale, Napier would become King, Goyder would become Narungga, while Little Para would once again become Elizabeth. In two-party terms since the previous election, the seats of Mawson and Elder would become notionally Liberal seats, while Hurtle Vale would become a notionally Labor seat. Mawson in the outer southern suburbs would geographically change the most, stretching along the coast right through to as far as and including Kangaroo Island. Hurtle Vale's margin change of 9 percent would be the largest in the state, with Mawson to change 8.3 percent and King to change 8 percent.

Upon the release of the draft redistribution, Liberal MP Rachel Sanderson organised the mass distribution of a pro forma document in the two inner metropolitan suburbs of Walkerville and Gilberton, which aimed for residents to use the pro forma document to submit their objection to the commission in support of Sanderson's campaign to keep the two suburbs in her seat of Adelaide, which in the draft would have been transferred to neighbouring Torrens. Sanderson's position however was at odds with her own party's submission which in fact agreed with the commission that Walkerville should be transferred to Torrens. Under the commission's draft proposal, the Liberal margin in Adelaide would have been reduced from 2.4 percent to 0.6 percent, but would have also resulted in the Labor margin in Torrens reduced from 3.5 percent to 1.1 percent. Of a record 130 total submissions received in response to the draft redistribution, about 100 (over three quarters of all submissions) were from Walkerville and Gilberton. As a result, the commission reversed the draft decision in the final publication.

Along with other various alterations in the final publication released in December 2016, in addition to Hurtle Vale becoming a notionally Labor seat and Mawson and Elder becoming notionally Liberal seats in the draft redistribution, the final redistribution additionally turned Newland and the bellwether of Colton in to notionally Liberal seats. These further changes provide a 27 Liberal−20 Labor notional seat count in two-party terms, a net change of three seats from Labor to Liberal since the previous election.

Labor objected to the commission's interpretation of the fairness requirements and appealed against it to the Supreme Court of South Australia in accordance with the provisions of the Constitution Act 1934 (SA). Labor sought to have the redistribution order quashed and have the Boundaries Commission make a fresh redistribution. The Grounds of Appeal were stated to relate to the Commission's interpretation of section 77 relating to the number of electors in each electoral district, with the redistribution reducing the number of voters in rural seats and increasing the number of voters in metropolitan seats, though still within the one vote, one value 10 percent tolerance. The Supreme Court appeal was rejected on 10 March 2017. Labor considered but decided against an appeal to the High Court.

=== Post-redistribution pendulum ===
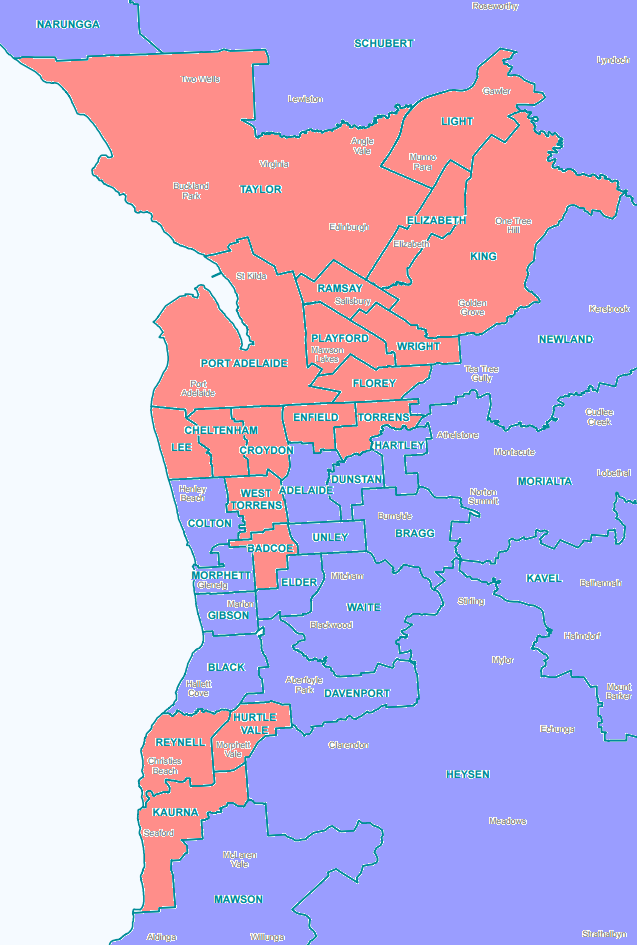
Redistributed metropolitan seats

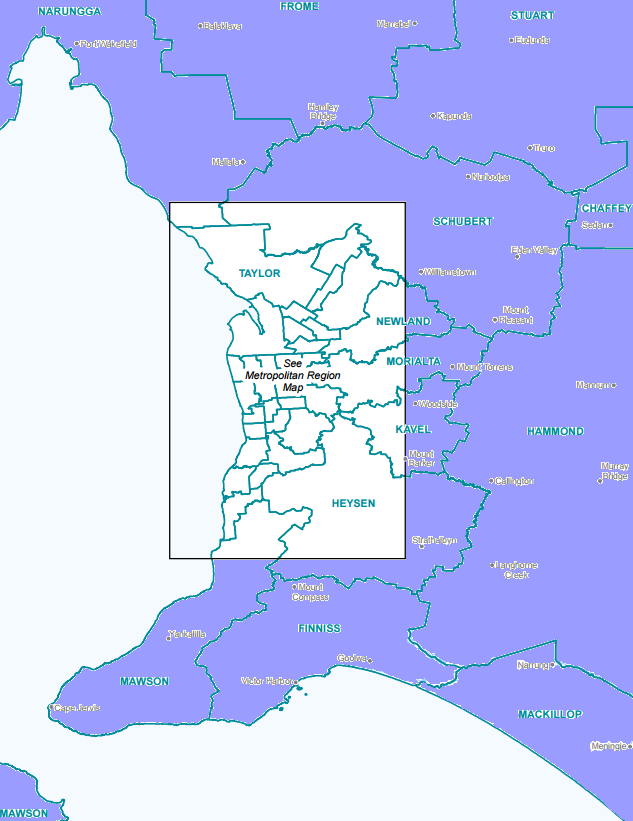
Redistributed inner-rural seats

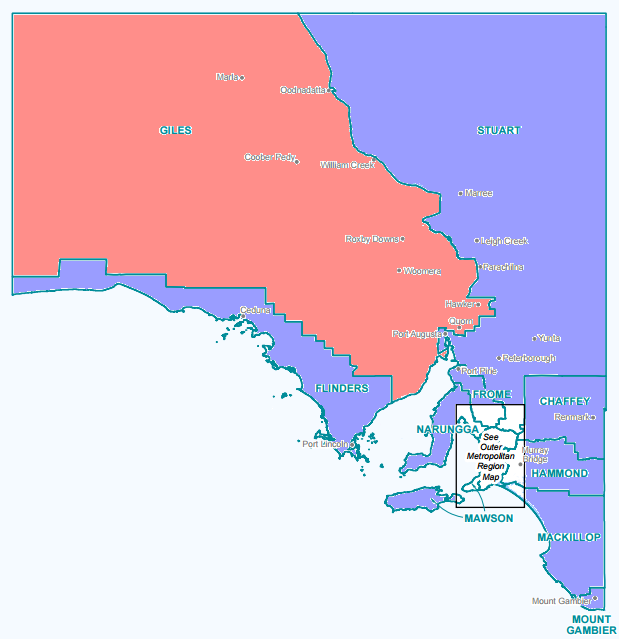
Redistributed outer-rural seats

Below post-redistribution margins listed were calculated by the South Australian Electoral Districts Boundaries Commission, and differ somewhat from those calculated by the ABC's Antony Green. The EDBC is the only redistribution authority in Australia that is required to examine voting patterns in drawing electoral boundaries, and in doing so, assume that the proportion of each party's vote in the declaration vote (postal, pre-poll and absent votes) is evenly distributed across the whole of each former electorate. Antony Green's margin estimates are more accurately calculated using declaration votes from the redistributed polling booths.

Retiring members are shown in italic text.

Labor seats by notional 2PP (20)
Marginal
King	Jon Gee	ALP	1.4%
Hurtle Vale	Nat Cook	ALP	1.7%
Lee	Stephen Mullighan	ALP	2.6%
Torrens	Dana Wortley	ALP	2.6%
Light	Tony Piccolo	ALP	3.9%
Badcoe	Steph Key	ALP	4.2%
Wright	Jennifer Rankine	ALP	4.5%
Giles	Eddie Hughes	ALP	5.7%
Fairly safe
Enfield	John Rau	ALP	6.2%
Kaurna	Chris Picton	ALP	8.4%
Taylor	Leesa Vlahos	ALP	8.8%
Florey	Frances Bedford (IND)	ALP	9.2%
Reynell	Katrine Hildyard	ALP	9.8%
Elizabeth	Lee Odenwalder	ALP	9.9%
Safe
Playford	Jack Snelling	ALP	11.5%
West Torrens	Tom Koutsantonis	ALP	12.2%
Port Adelaide	Susan Close	ALP	12.5%
Cheltenham	Jay Weatherill	ALP	14.4%
Ramsay	Zoe Bettison	ALP	17.4%
Croydon	Michael Atkinson	ALP	19.6%

Liberal seats by notional 2PP (27)
Marginal
Newland	Tom Kenyon (ALP)	LIB	0.1%
Adelaide	Rachel Sanderson	LIB	2.0%
Black	David Speirs	LIB	2.6%
Mawson	Leon Bignell (ALP)	LIB	3.2%
Gibson	Corey Wingard	LIB	3.2%
Hartley	Vincent Tarzia	LIB	3.3%
Colton	Paul Caica (ALP)	LIB	3.7%
Dunstan	Steven Marshall	LIB	3.9%
Elder	Annabel Digance (ALP)	LIB	4.3%
Fairly safe
Morphett	Duncan McFetridge (IND)	LIB	7.7%
Davenport	Sam Duluk	LIB	8.9%
Unley	David Pisoni	LIB	9.2%
Safe
Waite	Martin Hamilton-Smith (IND)	LIB	10.4%
Frome	Geoff Brock (IND)	LIB	10.5%
Morialta	John Gardner	LIB	11.6%
Schubert	Stephan Knoll	LIB	12.4%
Heysen	Isobel Redmond	LIB	13.2%
Finniss	Michael Pengilly	LIB	13.7%
Narungga	Steven Griffiths	LIB	13.8%
Kavel	Mark Goldsworthy	LIB	14.1%
Hammond	Adrian Pederick	LIB	16.3%
Bragg	Vickie Chapman	LIB	16.6%
Stuart	Dan van Holst Pellekaan	LIB	20.1%
Mt Gambier	Troy Bell (IND)	LIB	21.6%
Chaffey	Tim Whetstone	LIB	24.4%
MacKillop	Mitch Williams	LIB	26.7%
Flinders	Peter Treloar	LIB	28.7%

== Post-election pendulum ==
Liberal seats (25)
Marginal
King	Paula Luethen	LIB	0.7
Adelaide	Rachel Sanderson	LIB	1.0
Heysen	Josh Teague	LIB	1.8 v SAB
Newland	Richard Harvey	LIB	2.0
Elder	Carolyn Habib	LIB	4.4
Finniss	David Basham	LIB	4.6 v SAB
Fairly safe
Dunstan	Steven Marshall	LIB	6.1
Hartley	Vincent Tarzia	LIB	7.8
Waite	Sam Duluk	LIB	7.8
Colton	Matt Cowdrey	LIB	7.9
Chaffey	Tim Whetstone	LIB	8.6 v SAB
Black	David Speirs	LIB	8.7
Davenport	Steve Murray	LIB	8.8
Gibson	Corey Wingard	LIB	9.3
Narungga	Fraser Ellis	LIB	9.5 v SAB
Kavel	Dan Cregan	LIB	9.7 v SAB
Safe
Morphett	Stephen Patterson	LIB	10.5
Morialta	John Gardner	LIB	10.7
Unley	David Pisoni	LIB	11.3
Hammond	Adrian Pederick	LIB	12.1 v SAB
Schubert	Stephan Knoll	LIB	14.3
Bragg	Vickie Chapman	LIB	17.4
MacKillop	Nick McBride	LIB	17.6 v SAB
Stuart	Dan van Holst Pellekaan	LIB	23.1
Flinders	Peter Treloar	LIB	26.3

Labor seats (19)
Marginal
Mawson	Leon Bignell	ALP	0.3
Wright	Blair Boyer	ALP	3.5
Lee	Stephen Mullighan	ALP	3.8
Torrens	Dana Wortley	ALP	4.6
Hurtle Vale	Nat Cook	ALP	5.3
Badcoe	Jayne Stinson	ALP	5.5
Taylor	Jon Gee	ALP	5.7 v SAB
Fairly safe
Giles	Eddie Hughes	ALP	7.4 v SAB
Enfield	John Rau	ALP	7.9
Light	Tony Piccolo	ALP	9.9
Safe
Port Adelaide	Susan Close	ALP	11.1 v SAB
West Torrens	Tom Koutsantonis	ALP	13.2
Elizabeth	Lee Odenwalder	ALP	13.9 v SAB
Reynell	Katrine Hildyard	ALP	14.5
Kaurna	Chris Picton	ALP	14.9
Ramsay	Zoe Bettison	ALP	15.5 v SAB
Cheltenham	Jay Weatherill	ALP	15.9
Playford	Michael Brown	ALP	16.3
Croydon	Peter Malinauskas	ALP	24.4
Crossbench seats (3)
Florey	Frances Bedford	IND	6.1 v ALP
Frome	Geoff Brock	IND	8.4 v LIB
Mount Gambier	Troy Bell	IND	10.3 v LIB

== Retiring MPs ==
=== Labor ===
- Michael Atkinson MHA (Croydon)
- Paul Caica MHA (Colton)
- Steph Key MHA (Ashford)
- Jennifer Rankine MHA (Wright)
- Jack Snelling MHA (Playford)
- Leesa Vlahos MHA (Taylor)
- Gail Gago MLC
- John Gazzola MLC

=== Liberal ===
- Mark Goldsworthy MHA (Kavel)
- Steven Griffiths MHA (Goyder)
- Michael Pengilly MHA (Finniss)
- Isobel Redmond MHA (Heysen)
- Mitch Williams MHA (MacKillop)

=== Independent ===
- Martin Hamilton-Smith MHA (Waite)

== Opinion polling ==
The July to September 2014 Newspoll saw Labor leading the Liberals on the two-party preferred (2PP) vote for the first time since 2009. The October to December 2015 Newspoll saw Marshall's leadership approval rating plummet 11 points to 30 percent, the equal lowest Newspoll approval rating in history for a South Australian Opposition Leader since Dale Baker in 1990.

The first state-level Newspoll to be conducted in two years, in late 2017, did not publish a 2PP figure, claiming that calculating it had become difficult due to the large third-party primary vote of SA Best. Roy Morgan ceased publishing a 2PP figure from January 2018.

Essential polling's 2PP figures were calculated with approximated SA Best preference flows of 60/40 to Liberal/Labor.

Primary vote opinion polling for the 2018 South Australian state election with a local regression (LOESS) trendline for each party.

Two-party-preferred opinion polling for the 2018 South Australian state election with a local regression (LOESS) trendline for each party.

=== Voting intention ===
Date	Firm	Primary vote					TPP vote	
Date	Firm	LIB	ALP	SAB	GRN	OTH	LIB	ALP
17 Mar 2018	Election	38.0%	32.8%	14.1%	6.7%	8.4%	51.9%	48.1%
Trend	Poll Bludger	32.8%	30.6%	18.0%	7.6%	11.1%	—N/a	—N/a
17 Mar 2018	Galaxy (Exit Poll)	36%	31%	15%	8%	10%	50.5%	49.5%
15 Mar 2018	ReachTEL	34%	31%	16%	8%	11%	48%	52%
13–15 Mar 2018	Newspoll	34%	31%	17%	8%	10%	—N/a	—N/a
27 Feb–1 Mar 2018	Newspoll	32%	30%	21%	7%	10%	—N/a	—N/a
29 Jan 2018	ReachTEL	33.4%	26.1%	17.6%	5.5%	9.1%	—N/a	—N/a
11–12 Jan 2018	Roy Morgan	32%	23.5%	28.5%	9%	7%	—N/a	—N/a
Oct–Dec 2017	Essential	31%	34%	22%	8%	6%	49%	51%
Oct–Dec 2017	Newspoll	29%	27%	32%	6%	6%	—N/a	—N/a
Jul–Sep 2017	Essential	30%	37%	18%	6%	10%	48%	52%
28–29 Jun 2017	Galaxy	34%	28%	21%	6%	11%	50%	50%
Apr–Jun 2017	Essential	31%	36%	19%	7%	8%	48%	52%
Jan–Mar 2017	Essential	28%	35%	18%	6%	12%	48%	52%
Oct–Dec 2016	Essential	32%	35%	17%	7%	8%	49%	51%
1–2 Oct 2016	Roy Morgan	36.5%	24.5%	19.5%	11%	8.5%	54%	46%
12–14 Sep 2016	Galaxy	35%	27%	22%	7%	9%	50%	50%
Jul–Sep 2016	Essential	30%	38%	16%	7%	9%	46%	54%
Apr–Jun 2016	Essential	30%	34%	20%	7%	9%	49%	51%
Jan–Mar 2016	Essential	29%	37%	15%	9%	10%	46%	54%
3–5 Feb 2016	Galaxy	33%	28%	24%	7%	8%	51%	49%
Oct–Dec 2015	Essential	32%	39%	–	10%	19%	46%	54%
Oct–Dec 2015	Newspoll	38%	36%	–	9%	17%	49%	51%
Apr–Jun 2015	Newspoll	33%	36%	–	10%	21%	46%	54%
Jan–Mar 2015	Newspoll	33%	36%	–	10%	21%	46%	54%
Oct–Dec 2014	Newspoll	33%	35%	–	10%	22%	47%	53%
Jul–Sep 2014	Newspoll	36%	34%	–	9%	21%	49%	51%
15 Mar 2014	Election	44.8%	35.8%	–	8.7%	10.7%	53.0%	47.0%

=== Leadership approval ===
Better Premier and satisfaction polling^
Date	Firm	Better Premier		Weatherill		Marshall
		Weatherill	Marshall	Satisfied	Dissatisfied	Satisfied	Dissatisfied
17 Mar 2018 election		–	–	–	–	–	–
13–15 Mar 2018	Newspoll	38%	33%	33%	53%	30%	50%
27 Feb–1 Mar 2018	Newspoll	38%	31%	33%	54%	28%	54%
Oct–Dec 2017	Newspoll	37%	32%	34%	53%	27%	50%
Oct–Dec 2015	Newspoll	42%	27%	37%	46%	30%	44%
Apr–Jun 2015	Newspoll	48%	29%	45%	43%	41%	39%
Jan–Mar 2015	Newspoll	47%	31%	43%	41%	41%	37%
Oct–Dec 2014	Newspoll	47%	29%	46%	42%	35%	42%
Jul–Sep 2014	Newspoll	45%	30%	45%	37%	40%	34%
^ Remainder were "uncommitted" to either leader.

== See also ==
- Candidates of the South Australian state election, 2018
- Members of the South Australian House of Assembly, 2018–2022
- Members of the South Australian Legislative Council, 2018–2022
- Results of the South Australian state election, 2018 (House of Assembly)
- Results of the 2018 South Australian state election (Legislative Council)
- 2014 South Australian state election
- 2022 South Australian state election
- Marshall ministry
