= Valuer-General of South Australia =

Property valuations officer of South Australia

- Incumbent; Katherine Bartolo
- Attorney-General's Department of South Australia
- Appointer: Governor of South Australia
- Term length: 5 years
- Constituting instrument: Valuation of Land Act 1971
- Formation: 1972
- First holder: John P. Petherick
- Deputy: Deputy to the Valuer-General
- Website: https://www.valuergeneral.sa.gov.au/

The Valuer-General of South Australia is an independent officer in charge of property valuations and oversees government property valuations and council rate valuation.

The Valuer-General provides valuation advice to all parts of the Government of South Australia as well as engaging with the private industry valuations. The Office of the Valuer-General (OVG) provides regulatory oversight of Land Services SA.

The position of Valuer-General was created by the Valuation of Land Act 1971, which sets out the role and responsibilities for the position as well as the OVG.

The incumbent Valuer-General is Katherine Bartolo as of January 2019.
