= John Darley (politician) =

Australian politician (born 1937)

John Darley OAM

Leader of Advance SA
- In office 15 September 2017 – 25 August 2022
- Deputy: Peter Humphries
- Preceded by: Party established
- Succeeded by: Party dissolved

Member of the South Australian Legislative Council
- In office 21 November 2007 – 19 March 2022
- Preceded by: Nick Xenophon

Valuer-General of South Australia
- In office c. 2000 – c. 18 March 2006
- Succeeded by: Delfina Lanzilli

Personal details
- Born: John Andrew Darley; 15 May 1937 (age 89)
- Party: Advance SA (since 2017)
- Other political affiliations: Xenophon Team (2014–2017); Independent (before 2007–2014; 2017)
- Occupation: Government department chief executive (Government of South Australia)
- Profession: Public servant Politician

John Andrew Darley OAM (born 15 May 1937) is an Australian former politician who was member of the South Australian Legislative Council.

== Political career ==
Darley was appointed to the South Australian Legislative Council by a joint sitting of the Parliament of South Australia on 21 November 2007 to replace outgoing Independent No Pokies MLC Nick Xenophon who resigned to contest the Australian Senate at the 2007 federal election. Darley was the third of three candidates on the independent No Pokies upper house ticket at the 2006 state election.

Darley was re-elected at the 2014 state election as the first candidate on the independent Nick Xenophon ticket. In 2015, Nick Xenophon Group (NXG) changed its name to Nick Xenophon Team (NXT).

=== 2018 state election ===
Darley left the Nick Xenophon Team and became an independent on 17 August 2017 ahead of the 2018 state election. He said: "There are many things I could say as to why I have resigned. However, it is not my place to speak publicly about internal party matters". Though it was stated that there had been months of conflict between Darley and the party, it came to a head a week prior when Darley voted with the Labor government to back Legislative Council voting reforms. Xenophon indicated the resignation had averted Darley's imminent expulsion from the party due to "breaches to party rules". Nick Xenophon's SA-BEST therefore contested the 2018 election without state parliamentary representation.

On 15 September 2017, Darley announced that he would team up with another former Xenophon affiliate, retired lawyer Peter Humphries, to form another new party called Advance SA. Darley's term in the Legislative Council did not expire until 2022, and Humphries was the party's lead candidate for the 2018 election. Darley announced that Advance SA would not run candidates for the lower house, and would not direct preferences to SA-BEST or any other party.

Advance SA received 0.4% of the vote, and did not get any candidates elected at the 2018 election. Darley was not up for re-election. Darley's term continued until 2022, when he was defeated.
