= Advance SA =

- Leader: John Darley
- Founded: 15 September 2017
- Registered: 7 November 2017
- Dissolved: 25 August 2022
- Split from: Nick Xenophon Team
- Political position: Centre

Website
- Party website (archived)

Advance SA was a political party in South Australia active from 2017 to 2022. Founded by John Darley, a member of parliament who had formerly represented the Nick Xenophon Team, the self-described centrist party achieved no electoral success throughout its existence, polling less than 1 per cent at the two state elections it contested. After Darley lost his seat at the 2022 state election, the party voluntarily deregistered.

== History ==
John Darley, a South Australian Legislative Councillor, left the Nick Xenophon Team (NXT) in August 2017. Darley, who had served in the upper house since 2007, stated that Xenophon had refused to entertain any opposition to his views, describing him as a "complete dictator". Darley resigned a day before his expulsion was to be put before the party, as he had voted against NXT policy on electoral reform.

On 15 September 2017, Darley and Peter Humphries, a retired lawyer, announced the formation of Advance SA. Humphries had considered standing with SA Best, a party newly founded by Xenophon, but was rejected due to his position on renewable energy. Humphries described the new party as centrist. At the party's foundation, Humphries was confirmed as the party's lead candidate in the Legislative Council at the 2018 state election, as Darley's term would not expire until 2022. Darley said that the party could announce additional upper house candidates, but would not stand in the lower house.

Jenny Low, an adviser to Darley, was announced as the second candidate on Advance SA's upper house ticket on 3 November 2017. Low, who had previously been in a relationship with Xenophon, stated at her campaign launch that Xenophon had behaved in a "manipulative and controlling" way towards her during their relationship. Xenophon rejected Low's assertions, and said that Advance SA was using his former relationship for "blatant political gain".

Advance SA was registered by the Electoral Commission on 7 November 2017. During the campaign, The Advertiser reported that Advance SA would demand an audit of the public service in exchange for their support of upper house legislation. Humphries said that there were "around 20,000 too many public servants employed in SA", out of a total of approximately 120,000.

At the 2018 state election, Advance SA polled 0.4 per cent of the vote, which was too low to entitle the party to any seats in the Legislative Council. Although SA Best had elected two MPs to the upper house, Connie Bonaros and Frank Pangallo, Darley said he was unlikely to work with them, describing SA Best as "dickheads" and suggesting the party would split.

Darley stood for re-election in 2022 as the lead candidate for Advance SA. Darley was defeated, as the party only received 0.3 per cent of the vote. Advance SA was voluntarily deregistered by the Electoral Commission on 26 August 2022.

== Electoral results ==
Legislative Council
Year	# of votes	% of vote	# of seats won	# of total seats	Sources
2018	4,227	0.4	0 / 11	1 / 22	
2022	3,623	0.3	0 / 11	0 / 22	
