= Child Protection Party =

- Abbreviation: CPP
- President: Clinton de Young
- Secretary: Avery Hilditch
- Founder: Tony Tonkin
- Founded: 18 January 2015
- Dissolved: 30 June 2021
- Headquarters: Alexander Heights, Western Australia
- Ideology: Child protection advocacy
- Slogan: Be The Change

Website
- www.childprotection.party

The Child Protection Party (CPP) was a minor Australian political party based and registered in South Australia. Its platform was based around child protection.

The party unsuccessfully ran 2 upper house candidates at the 2018 state election with around 1.5% of the statewide vote.

At the 2019 federal election, the party unsuccessfully contested one electorate. It was deregistered by the AEC on 30 June 2021. Since child protection is a state and not a federal responsibility, the Party did not challenge deregistration.

At the 2022 Victorian state election, the party endorsed independent candidate Eric Koelmeyer in the seat of Bundoora, as it is not registered with the Victorian Electoral Commission. Koelmeyer was unsuccessful.
