= Connie Bonaros =

Australian politician

The Honourable Connie Bonaros
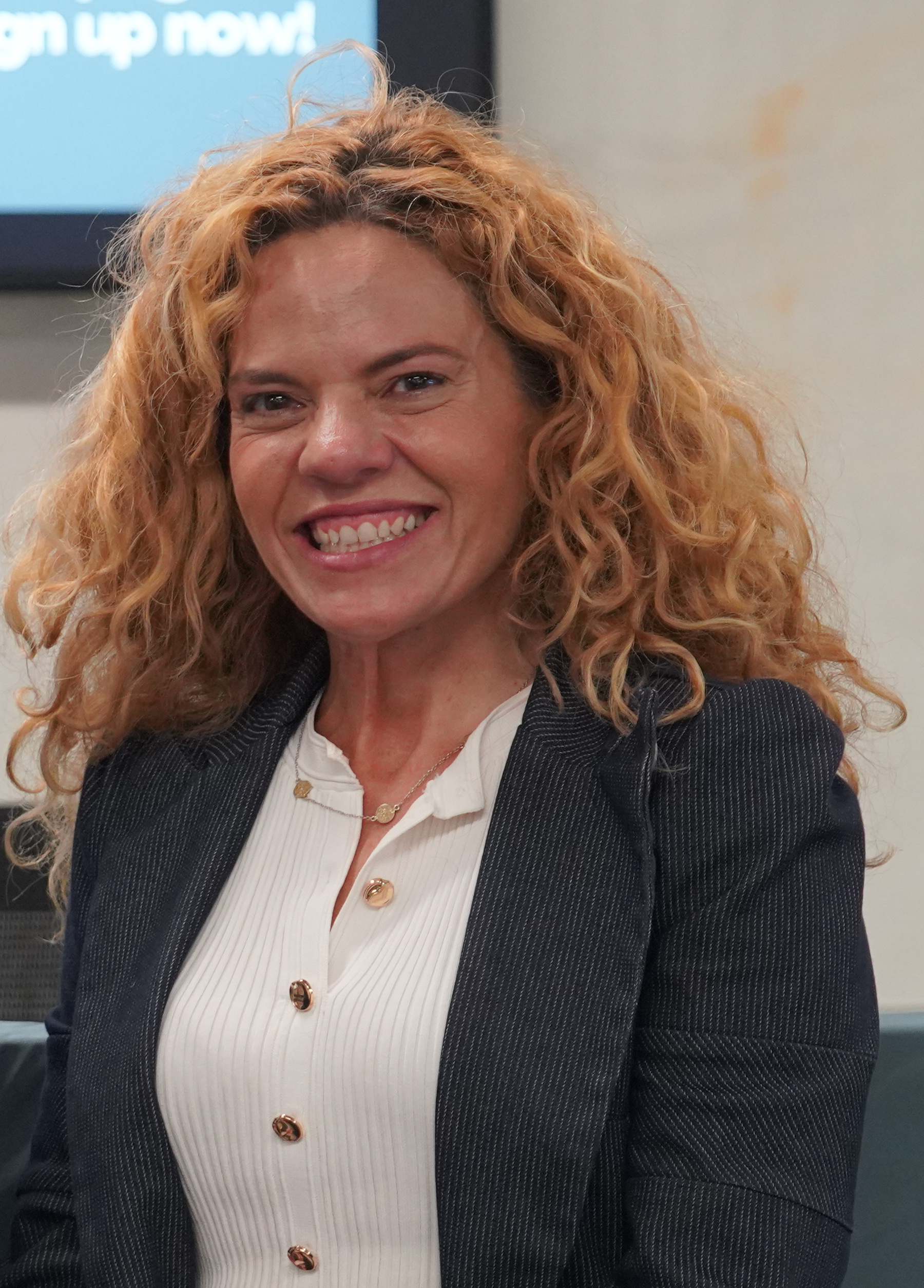
- Bonaros at Flinders University in 2026

Member of the South Australian Legislative Council
- In office 17 March 2018 – 20 March 2026

Personal details
- Born: Constadina Bonaros
- Party: SA Best
- Children: 1
- Education: University of Adelaide
- Website: conniebonaros.com.au

Constadina Bonaros is an Australian politician. A former advisor to Nick Xenophon, she was elected as an SA Best member of the South Australian Legislative Council at the 2018 state election. One of two SA Best members elected, she was the sole representative for the party after Frank Pangallo defected in 2023. She stood for re-election at the 2026 state election, but was unsuccessful. Bonaros is currently the CEO of Seafood Industry South Australia.

== Early life ==
Constadina Bonaros was born as the youngest of three children to Greek Australian parents Dimitrios and Dimitra. Her father is from the island of Pylos, and her mother from the village of Paradeisia. As a child, Bonaros was raised in both Adelaide and Coober Pedy, as her father worked in the latter town as an opal miner and dealer.

== Career ==
Bonaros has undergraduate degrees in Laws and Arts (Modern Greek and Social Politics) from the University of Adelaide. She had worked as a lawyer from 2003 until 2006. From 2005 onwards, Bonaros worked as an advisor to Nick Xenophon and John Darley. Bonaros stood at the 2014 state election as the second candidate on the Independent Nick Xenophon Team ticket in the Legislative Council. At the time Bonaros was a staffer to Darley, who led the ticket. Although the Independent Nick Xenophon Team ticket polled 12.9% of the statewide vote, enough to elect Darley, Bonaros' bid for election was unsuccessful. She joined Senator Stirling Griff's office as his chief of staff when he was elected at the 2016 federal election.

Connie Bonaros was SA Best's lead candidate for the Legislative Council at the 2018 South Australian state election. She was successfully elected at the 2018 state election, becoming one of SA Best's two parliamentarians, alongside Frank Pangallo.

Bonaros introduced a bill for a ban on child-like sex dolls in August 2019. The bill received the support of both the opposition Labor and governing Liberal parties, was given royal assent in October 2019, and came into effect in January 2020.

Bonaros has campaigned for tighter regulation of anime and manga, due to concerns over depiction of child exploitation material. In February 2020, she called for an urgent review of Australian classification laws, highlighting Eromanga Sensei and No Game No Life as series that involve children and themes of incest, rape and sexual abuse. In July 2020, Books Kinokuniya removed those two series from their Sydney store, as well as five others, including Sword Art Online and Goblin Slayer. Bonaros' advocacy also led to volumes of No Game No Life being refused classification by the Australian Classification Board.

In January 2020, Connie Bonaros made a complaint of inappropriate sexual harassment against another member of Parliament, with the incident involving a slap and having occurred at a Christmas party at Parliament House. It soon emerged the complaint was against Sam Duluk, Liberal MP for Waite, who apologised and resigned from a parliamentary committee chair position. Following Bonaros' allegations and a report being made to the police, a statement was issued in April 2020 by South Australia Police confirming that Duluk was facing one count of basic assault and would appear in court at a later date. Duluk was ultimately acquitted in August 2021 due to the conflicting testimony of Bonaros and a Greens staffer, the latter of whom had suggested a different and irreconcilable version of events, per magistrate John Wells. However, Wells labeled Duluk's behaviour towards Bonaros as "rude, unpleasant, insensitive and disrespectful". The following month, Tammy Franks used parliamentary privilege to levy additional allegations of sexual harassment and harassing remarks against Duluk.

Bonaros supported a measure by the Malinauskas Labor government to merge the University of South Australia and the University of Adelaide, creating Adelaide University. An October 2023 deal struck with Bonaros, as well as then-One Nation MLC Sarah Game, saw student support funds for the proposed new university increased by A$20 million to a total of A$120 million in order to allow for greater allocation of scholarships, as well as a A$40 million student support fund established for Flinders University.

Bonaros' colleague in SA Best, Frank Pangallo, had not yet decided to support the bill at the time of Bonaros' support for it. This difference in opinion was reported by The Advertiser as a factor in Pangallo's December 2023 decision to leave SA Best. Pangallo said at the time that his decision was motivated by ideological differences between him and Bonaros, while Bonaros stated that her values and that of SA Best remained the same as those when she was elected.

In May 2024, Connie Bonaros, Tammy Franks, and Mira El Dannawi all wore Palestinian keffiyehs, which symbolise support for Palestine, in the Legislative Council. Liberal Nicola Centofanti criticised their decision as inappropriate and offensive, in response Bonaros cited the killing of children in Gaza following the October 7 attacks as a far greater offense.

Bonaros stood for re-election at the 2026 state election, contesting the Legislative Council for SA Best. She was critical of One Nation throughout the campaign, describing Cory Bernardi as a "malaka" over a statement he made linking same-sex marriage to bestiality, and telling Bernardi and Pauline Hanson at a polling place that they "sow division and fear and hate". Bonaros lost her seat at the state election, with SA Best polling 0.6 per cent in the Legislative Council.

After the state election, Bonaros was appointed CEO of Seafood Industry South Australia. She was named to the Carrick Hill Trust in September 2026.
