= Stop Population Growth Now =

Political party in South Australia

- Leader: Bob Couch
- Registered: 2014
- Headquarters: South Australia
- Colours: Green; Orange

Website
- www.stoppopulationgrowthnow.com

Stop Population Growth Now was a registered political party in South Australia led by Bob Couch. The party contested the 2014 state election in the Legislative Assembly (upper house) with a 0.4 percent vote.

In the 2018 State Election, the party ran in both the upper house and the House of Assembly (lower house) in the Electoral district of Unley. The party gained precisely 1.2% in both electorates.

The party was deregistered in 2019 along with the Dignity Party, the Liberal Democrats and the Danig Party of Australia.

== Electoral results ==
Legislative Council
Election year	# of overall votes	% of overall vote	# of overall seats won	# of overall seats	+/–	Position
2014	3,884	0.4% (#10)	0 / 11	0 / 22	▲	
2018	12,878	1.22 (#9)	0 / 11	0 / 22	▲	

== See also ==
- Sustainable Australia Party
