= Jayne Stinson =

Australian politician

Jayne Stinson MP

Member of the South Australian House of Assembly for Badcoe
- Incumbent
- Assumed office 17 March 2018
- Preceded by: New seat

Personal details
- Party: Labor
- Education: Charles Sturt University; Griffith University; University of Adelaide
- Profession: Journalist
- Website: jaynestinson.com.au

Jayne Marion Stinson is an Australian politician. She has been a Labor member of the South Australian House of Assembly since the 2018 state election, representing Badcoe in the inner south-western suburbs of Adelaide.

Stinson worked as a broadcast journalist for ABC News, Network Ten, Channel Seven, and media agencies in Cambodia, India, and Rwanda before her election. Stinson has also worked for the Law Society of South Australia and as an adviser to the Rudd and Gillard Labor governments.

Stinson was appointed to the front bench upon her election in 2018, taking up the portfolios of Child Protection and Arts. She was later promoted to the Planning and Development and Multicultural Affairs portfolios, while retaining Arts. She resigned from her portfolios in 2021 for personal reasons. She retained the seat of Badcoe at both the 2022 and 2026 elections.

South Australian House of Assembly
New seat	Member for Badcoe; 2018–present	Incumbent
