= SA Best =

South Australian political party

- Founder: Nick Xenophon
- Founded: March 2017
- Registered: 4 July 2017
- Dissolved: 24 September 2026
- Political position: Centre
- Colours: Orange; Black

Website
- Party website (2018)

SA Best (stylised SA-BEST) was a political party in South Australia. Founded in March 2017 by Australian senator Nick Xenophon as Nick Xenophon's SA-BEST, the party hoped to gain the balance of power at the 2018 South Australian state election.

Positive initial polling figures led the party to stand candidates in 36 of 47 seats in South Australia's House of Assembly. A key policy of SA Best was to reduce the number of poker machines in South Australia, which resulted in the Australian Hotels Association campaigning against the party. At the state election, SA Best underperformed expectations, winning no seats in the House of Assembly, and only electing two members to the Legislative Council, Connie Bonaros and Frank Pangallo.

In late 2018, Xenophon resigned as a party member of SA Best, and the party removed the reference to him from their official name. At the 2022 state election, the party focused on the Legislative Council, but lost most of its support from 2018. Pangallo left the party in 2023, leaving Bonaros as the only SA Best MP remaining. Bonaros lost her seat at the 2026 state election, after which the party was voluntarily deregistered.

== Formation ==
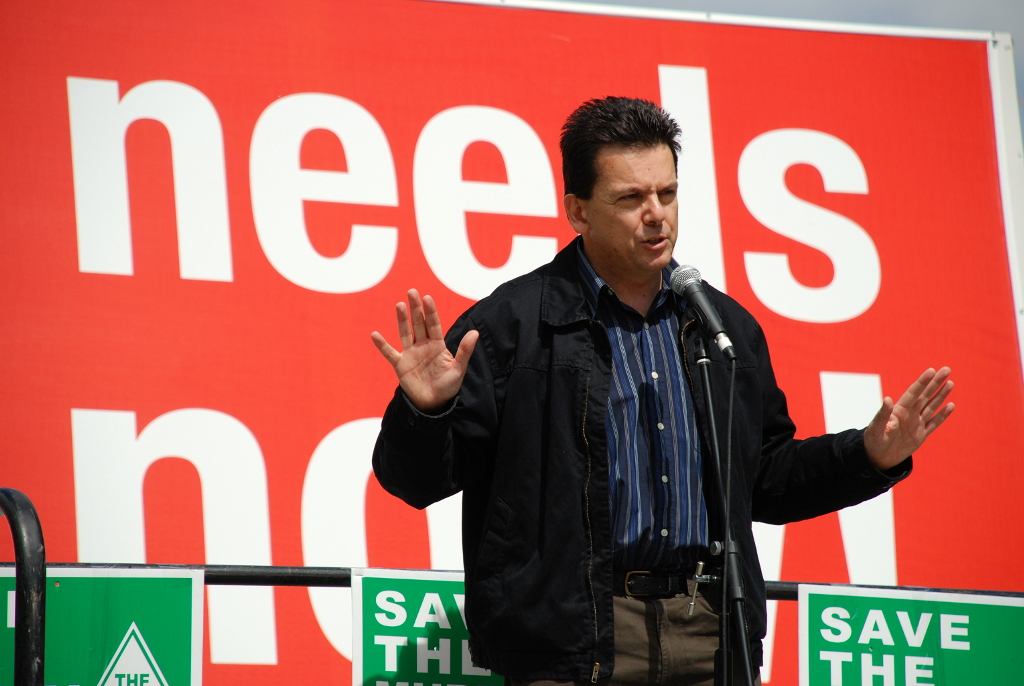
Nick Xenophon, founder of the party.

Federal Australian senator Nick Xenophon announced on 5 March 2017 that he would create a new political party to contest the 2018 South Australian state election, called SA Best. Xenophon stated that the new party would be based "from the political centre", with the aim of providing an alternative to the two major Labor and Liberal parties.

Both ABC News and The Advertiser reported that the new party was likely to lead to a national rebranding of the Nick Xenophon Team (NXT), which had won three seats in the Senate and one in the House of Representatives at the 2016 federal election. Xenophon himself had begun his political career in the South Australian Legislative Council, before transferring to the federal Senate in 2008. Xenophon said that the amount of candidates the party would run would be confirmed in mid-2017, but stated that the strong support NXT had received in outer suburbs of Adelaide and the Adelaide Hills would likely give it a "fighting chance" in certain seats of the House of Assembly.

Nick Xenophon's SA-BEST was registered by the Electoral Commission on 4 July 2017. John Darley, who had been elected as an NXT candidate at the 2014 state election, was the sole representative of SA Best in the Legislative Council, but left the party in August 2017. Darley resigned a day before his expulsion was to be put before the party, as he had voted against NXT policy on electoral reform. Upon his resignation, Darley said that Xenophon refused to entertain internal opposition, describing him as a "complete dictator".

On 6 October 2017, Xenophon announced he would leave the Senate to contest the 2018 state election, standing in the lower house district of Hartley. He stated that he would stay in the Senate until the High Court ruled on whether he was eligible to sit in parliament, as he was one of the Citizenship Seven. Xenophon said that he wished to run in Hartley, where he resided, to fix a "broken political system", and promised to not become a government minister if elected. The following day, SA Best announced candidates in a further six lower house seats. After the High Court ruled that Xenophon was validly elected, he resigned from the Senate on 31 October, with Rex Patrick, a submarinist and adviser to Xenophon, filling the vacant position. The party also announced that they had applied to the Australian Electoral Commission to rename NXT to SA-Best (Federal).

The formation of SA Best was immediately noted for its prospective impact on South Australian politics. Antony Green, a psephologist and election analyst for the Australian Broadcasting Corporation, described the party's creation as "the biggest shake-up in two-party politics in decades in Australia", and said that the next South Australian state election would be a three-way contest between the Liberal, Labor, and SA Best parties. Writing in Eureka Street, John Warhurst, an emeritus professor of political science at the Australian National University, said that if SA Best was as successful as some commentators predicted, it would result in a hung parliament, and that it was possible SA Best could elect a large number of MPs as One Nation had at the 1998 Queensland state election.

== 2018 state election ==
A poll commissioned by the Australian Banker's Association was released to The Australian on 19 October, and showed Xenophon leading as preferred premier with 41 per cent support, while the incumbent Labor premier Jay Weatherill and Liberal opposition leader Steven Marshall were at 21 per cent each. A Newspoll published on 19 December had SA Best leading in the statewide primary vote, polling 32 per cent, with the Liberal and Labor parties on 29 and 27 per cent respectively. This was Newspoll's first result since SA Best's foundation, the last poll having been in January 2016, and no two-party-preferred figure between the Labor and Liberal parties was calculated by the polling company due to the high performance of SA Best. In a retrospective of the SA Best campaign, political scientist Haydon Manning (who had an informal consultative role for the party as his wife, Hazel Wainwright, was the SA Best candidate for Mawson) stated that the high polling results had two effects on SA Best. First, that the party began to be viewed as an alternative government rather than a minor party seeking the balance of power. Secondly, the polls led to SA Best loosening vetting requirements for prospective candidates, as Xenophon wished for the party to stand in more electorates.

On 20 December, the day after the Newspoll's release, SA Best announced a further five candidates for the House of Assembly. Xenophon said at the time that the party's total number of lower house candidates would be around 20, with an equal number in Labor and Liberal-held electorates. SA Best's Legislative Council candidates were announced on 10 January, with Connie Bonaros, a staffer to Xenophon, ranked first on the party's ticket, journalist Frank Pangallo second, Port Augusta mayor Sam Johnson third, manufacturer Andrea Madeley fourth, and aged care specialist Peter Vincent fifth. Once preselected, SA Best required its candidates to contribute $20,000 to the party, and self-fund their local campaign. In part to help loan money to candidates who could not afford the upfront fee, Xenophon mortgaged his house for $600,000. SA Best ultimately nominated 36 candidates to stand in the House of Assembly, out of a potential 47.

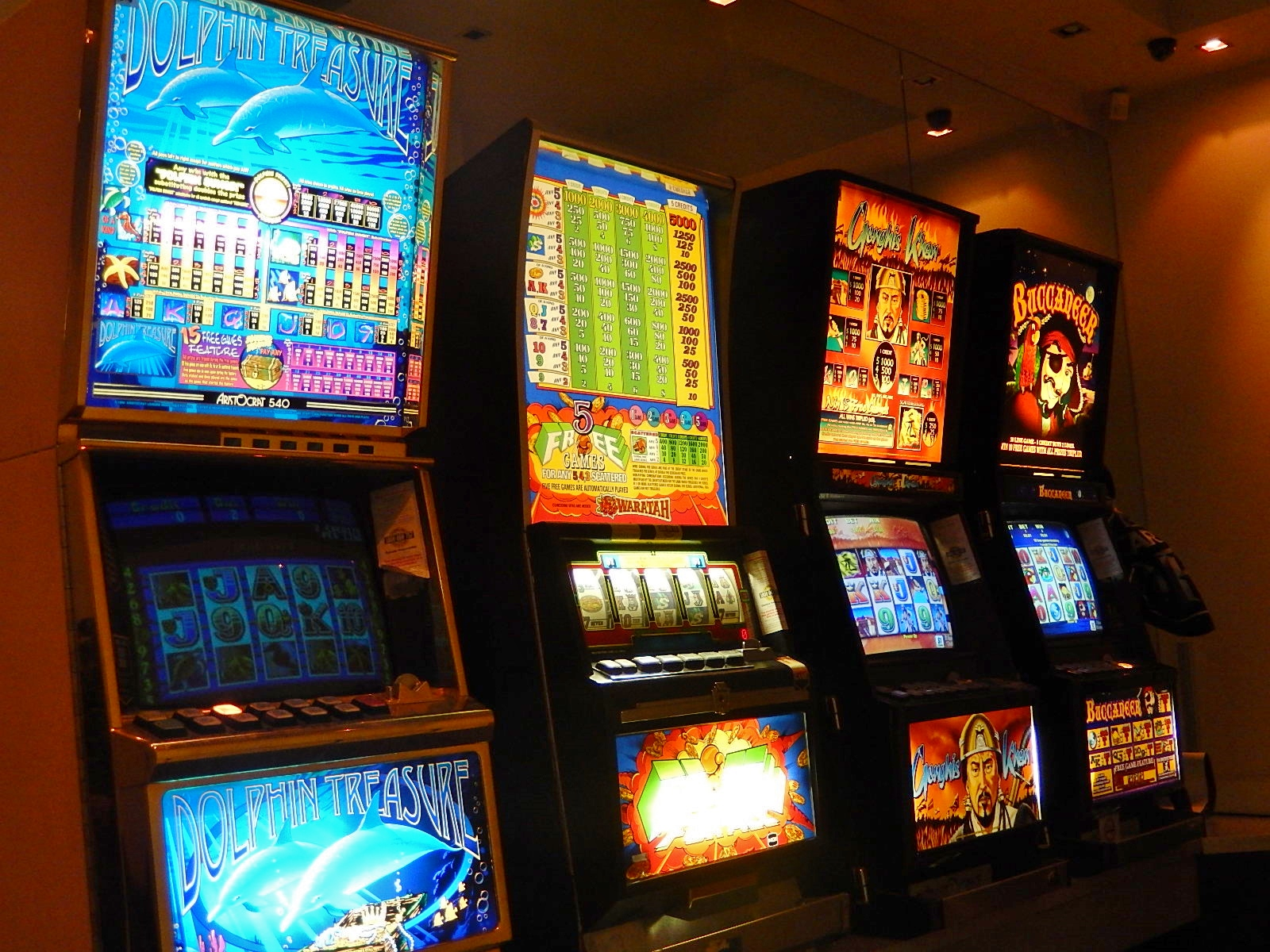
A key SA Best policy was to reduce the number of poker machines in South Australia.

In terms of policies, SA Best advocated for a decrease of members in the South Australian Parliament, and opposed the deregulation of shop trading hours. Although Xenophon had initially entered politics on a platform of banning poker machines in South Australia, SA Best advocated for a reduction of poker machines in the state rather than an outright ban. SA Best's policy was to cut the number of machines in hotels and clubs from 12,100 to 8,100 by 2023, and to introduce a bet limit of $1 per spin. Xenophon suggested that SA Best would expect support for these policies, saying "both Labor and the Liberals will become born again gambling reformers in a very short amount of time" if SA Best held the balance of power.

Both the Labor and Liberal parties criticised SA Best during the election campaign. The Labor Party often described Xenophon as a right-winger, due in part to the number of former Liberal members in the party, and premier Jay Weatherill said that some SA Best candidates had privately promised to leave the party if elected. The Liberal Party, meanwhile, argued that SA Best was primarily targeting seats held by them. On these grounds, opposition leader Steven Marshall stated that Xenophon had "done a deal with Labor", which Xenophon said was a lie, and threatened legal action if Marshall were to repeat the claim.

The Australian Hotels Association (AHA) also campaigned against SA Best due to their stance on pokie machines, with the group's South Australian general manager Ian Horne saying that a hung parliament would be undesirable for the state, and that "Xenophon has made it his life mission to do our industry great damage". The AHA donated both to the Labor, Liberal, and Conservative parties in advance of the election, with over $100,000 given in total during the 2017 calendar year.

SA Best's performance in the 2018 election by lower house district.

On election night, it was clear that SA Best had underperformed expectations. The party was not projected to win any seats in the House of Assembly, and Xenophon had been defeated in Hartley by incumbent Liberal Vincent Tarzia. Predictions of a hung parliament did not come to pass, as the Liberal Party won 25 out of 47 seats, electing Marshall premier. In the House of Assembly, SA Best received 14.15 per cent of the statewide vote, or an average of 18.4 per cent of the vote in the 36 seats they stood in. Per Antony Green's analysis, while the party did not win any lower house seats, they reached the two-candidate preferred count in twelve, and polled above 20 per cent of the primary vote in nine electorates. In the Liberal-held districts of Heysen and Finniss, SA Best came within a 5 per cent margin of victory. In Hartley, Xenophon placed second with 24.9 per cent of the primary vote, but was overtaken by the Labor candidate after preferences were distributed. Final results in the Legislative Council were declared in late April 2018, confirming the election of SA Best candidates Connie Bonaros and Frank Pangallo. The party polled a total of 19.36 per cent in the upper house.

Following the election, Xenophon credited SA Best's poor performance to the party's resources being spread thinly, and what he described as "dirty" campaigning against SA Best. In his post-election analysis of the party's failure, Haydon Manning said that Bonaros, the party's campaign director, had not previously run an election campaign, and that the strategic aspect of SA Best's campaign was mainly handled personally by Xenophon. Manning named two factors as the key reason for the party's failure to win a seat: Xenophon allowing the party to be viewed as a candidate for government, and the decision to increase the number of candidates following positive polling results. Manning also believed that SA Best should have run a negative campaign against the two major parties in the weeks before the election. Gary Johanson, the party's candidate in Port Adelaide and mayor of Port Adelaide Enfield, named the increase in candidates in the final weeks of the campaign and the negative campaign by the AHA as causes for electoral failure. Speaking to The New York Times, Pangallo stated that the AHA had "bought" the election in South Australia, comparing them to the National Rifle Association, an American gun rights lobby group.

== Post-election, decline ==
While SA Best failed to gain the balance of power in the House of Assembly, no party held a majority in the Legislative Council, and both the governing Liberal and opposition Labor parties required three votes to pass legislation. Indeed, Johanson predicted that SA Best's presence in the upper house could "keep the party alive", even without Xenophon as an elected MP. The crossbench in the Legislative Council consisted of two Greens, Bonaros and Pangallo, and John Darley, who had since created his own Advance SA party. However, Darley refused to work with SA Best, describing the party as "dickheads" and suggesting they would eventually split.

On 10 April 2018, the Nick Xenophon Team confirmed that they would change their name to the Centre Alliance. In December 2018, Xenophon resigned as a party member of SA Best, with The Australian reporting that the party had officially changed its name from Nick Xenophon's SA-Best to SA-Best at a "recent annual meeting".

At the 2022 South Australian state election, SA Best stood one candidate in the lower house and two in the upper house. Tom Antonio, a Whyalla businessman, stood again for the party in the district of Giles after placing second behind Labor MP Eddie Hughes at the 2018 state election. In the Legislative Council, SA Best's ticket was headed by Ian Markos, a former CEO of Master Builders South Australia, while Keyvan Abak, a psychotherapist, was the party's second candidate. SA Best campaigned on tax reform, including a halving of the payroll tax, with Markos stating that the party would oppose tax increases. Contingent on holding the balance of power in the Legislative Council, SA Best also promised an independent evaluation of the North–South Corridor project, and to pay the university debts of graduates who committed to work in regional areas for five years.

SA Best was unsuccessful in gaining a seat in the Legislative Council, polling 1 per cent of the vote. South Australia elects its upper house in staggered four-year terms, so neither Bonaros nor Pangallo were up for election in 2022, and held their seats until 2026. In Giles, Antonio's primary vote halved in comparison from the last state election, and he placed in third behind the Liberal and Labor candidates, receiving 11.2 per cent of the primary vote.

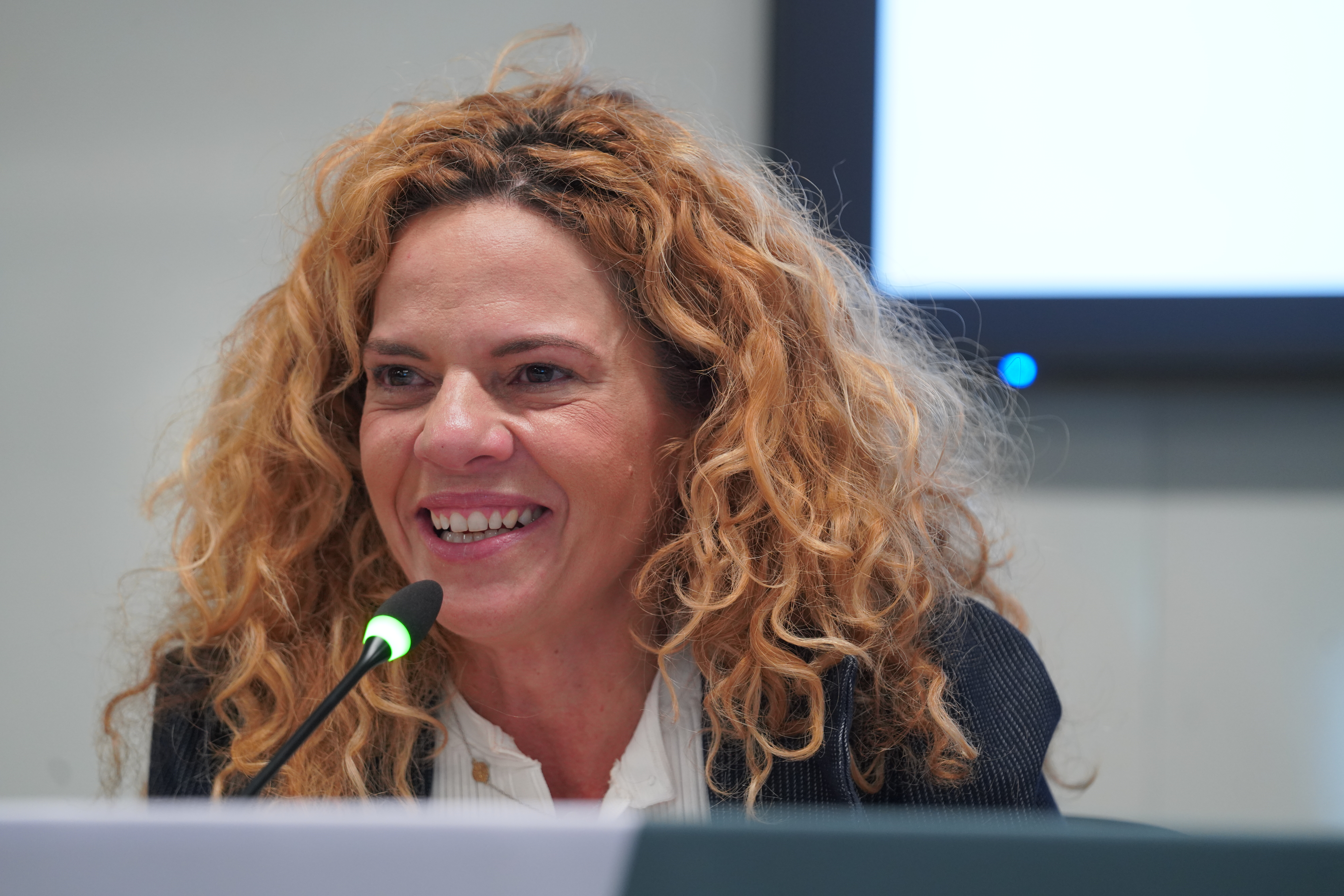
Connie Bonaros was SA Best's last remaining MP, and lost her seat at the 2026 election.

Pangallo left SA Best to sit as an independent MLC in December 2023, saying at the time that he and Bonaros "no longer share our once-aligned ideologies". According to The Advertiser, the dispute between Pangallo and Bonaros stemmed from Bonaros' decision in October 2023 to support a merger between the South Australia and Adelaide universities, as Pangallo had wanted more time to consider the proposal. Pangallo joined the Liberal Party in August 2025, unsuccessfully standing as their candidate in the lower house district of Waite at the 2026 state election.

SA Best stood six candidates at the 2026 South Australian state election, one in the lower house and five in the upper house. Bonaros stood for re-election and led the party's ticket in the Legislative Council. Thomas McNab, a resident of Port Lincoln, was the party's sole candidate for the House of Assembly, and contested the district of Flinders.

Bonaros was defeated at the election, with SA Best polling 0.6 per cent of the vote in the Legislative Council. Flinders was retained by Liberal MP Sam Telfer, with McNab polling 1.2 per cent of the primary vote. Josh Sunman, a lecturer at Flinders University, suggested that SA Best had failed to gain traction at the 2026 state election both because of the absence of Xenophon, and because voters who had supported him as an "anti-politics" figure in opposition to both the Liberal and Labor parties may have supported One Nation instead. SA Best was voluntarily deregistered as a political party on 24 September 2026.

== Electoral results ==
House of Assembly
Year	Candidates	# of votes	% of vote	# of seats	Sources
2018	36/47	148,360	14.1	0 / 47	
2022	1/47	2,171	0.2	0 / 47	
2026	1/47	257	0.0	0 / 47	

Legislative Council
Year	# of votes	% of vote	# of seats won	# of total seats	Sources
2018	203,364	19.4	2 / 11	2 / 22	
2022	11,392	1.0	0 / 11	2 / 22	
2026	7,125	0.6	0 / 11	0 / 22	

== See also ==
- No Pokies (1997-2014)
- Nick Xenophon Team
