= Peter Treloar =

Australian politician

Member of the South Australian House of Assembly for Flinders
- In office 20 March 2010 – 19 March 2022
- Preceded by: Liz Penfold
- Succeeded by: Sam Telfer

Personal details
- Party: Liberal
- Education: Cummins Area School; Prince Alfred College
- Occupation: Primary Producer
- Awards: Nuffield Australia Scholarship (2001)

Peter Andrew Treloar is an Australian politician who represented the South Australian House of Assembly seat of Flinders for the South Australian Division of the Liberal Party of Australia from the March 2010 election until 2022.

Treloar held the position of Deputy Opposition Whip from soon after his election, promoted to Opposition Whip on 4 February 2016. He also held the Shadow Minister portfolios of Emergency Services, Volunteers and Veterans' Affairs from 6 November 2012 to 8 February 2013 at which time he became Parliamentary Secretary to the Leader of the Opposition instead.

Treloar grew up at Cummins on Eyre Peninsula in his electorate. He studied at Prince Alfred College in Adelaide. He won a Nuffield Australia Farming Scholarship. The topic of his report was Investigation of value adding opportunities and the study of grain industry structures.

South Australian House of Assembly
Preceded by Liz Penfold	Member for Flinders; 2010–2022	Succeeded by Sam Telfer
