= Results of the 2010 South Australian state election (Legislative Council) =

Australian election results 2010

South Australian state election, 20 March 2010 Legislative Council << 2006–2014 >>
Enrolled voters	1,093,316				
Votes cast	1,015,386		Turnout	92.9	–0.2
Informal votes	58,714		Informal	5.8	+0.6
Summary of votes by party
Party	Primary votes	%	Swing	Seats won	Seats held
Liberal	376,786	39.4	+13.4	4	7
Labor	356,626	37.3	+0.7	4	8
Greens	63,358	6.6	+2.3	1	2
Family First	42,187	4.4	–0.6	1	2
Dignity for Disability	11,271	1.2	+0.6	1	1
Save the RAH	9,241	1.0	+1.0	0	0
Democrats	8,258	0.9	–0.9	0	0
Gamers 4 Croydon	7,994	0.8	+0.8	0	0
Democratic Labour	7,923	0.8	+0.8	0	0
Shooters	7,699	0.8	+0.2	0	0
Fair Land Tax	5,960	0.6	+0.6	0	0
One Nation	4,972	0.5	–0.3	0	0
FREE Australia	3,766	0.4	+0.4	0	0
National	3,489	0.4	–0.3	0	0
United Party	1,691	0.2	+0.2	0	0
Independent	45,451	4.8	+1.6	0	0
Total	956,672			11	22

This is a list of results for the Legislative Council at the 2010 South Australian state election.

== Election results ==
2010 South Australian state election: Legislative Council
Party	Candidate	Votes	%	±%
Quota		79,723		
Liberal	1. David Ridgway (elected 1); 2. Stephen Wade (elected 3); 3. Terry Stephens (elected 5); 4. Jing Lee (elected 7); 5. Rita Bouras; 6. Peter Salu; 7. Sarah Jared	376,786	39.4	+13.4
Labor	1. Paul Holloway (elected 2); 2. Gail Gago (elected 4); 3. Bernard Finnigan (elected 6); 4. John Gazzola (elected 8); 5. Tung Ngo	356,626	37.3	+0.7
Greens	1. Tammy Jennings (elected 9); 2. Simon Jones; 3. Sandy Montgomery	63,358	6.6	+2.3
Family First	1. Robert Brokenshire (elected 10); 2. Bob Randall; 3. Toni Turnbull	42,187	4.4	−0.6
Dignity for Disability	1. Paul Collier*; 2. Kelly Vincent (elected 11); 3. Michele Thredgold; 4. Ronni Wood	11,271	1.2	+1.2
Save the RAH	1. Jim Katsaros; 2. Mark Taplin; 3. Ken Rollond; 4. David McGowan	9,241	1.0	+1.0
Democrats	1. Jeanie Walker; 2. Tom Salerno; 3. Sandra Kanck	8,258	0.9	−0.9
Gamers 4 Croydon	Chris Prior	7,994	0.8	+0.8
Democratic Labour	1. Paul Russell; 2. David McCabe	7,923	0.8	+0.8
Shooters	Michael Hudson	7,699	0.8	+0.2
Independent SA Fishing and Lifestyle	1. Neil Armstrong; 2. Paul Tippins	7,105	0.7	+0.7
Independent Climate Sceptics	1. Nathan Ashby; 2. Frank Hunt; 3. John Michelmore	6,103	0.6	+0.6
Independent Communities Against Corruption	1. David Winderlich; 2. Kirsten Alexander	5,972	0.6	+0.6
Fair Land Tax	1. George Kargiotis; 2. Andrew Haralampopoulos	5,960	0.6	+0.6
Independent Legalise Voluntary Euthanasia	1. Jenny Wheaton; 2. Denis Haynes	5,160	0.5	+0.5
One Nation	1. Robert Edmonds; 2. Barbara Pannach	4,972	0.5	−0.3
FREE Australia	1. Paul Kuhn; 2. Ki Meekins	3,766	0.4	+0.4
National	1. Deb Thiele; 2. Kym Webber	3,489	0.4	−0.3
Independent Motorsports Land Tax	1. Joe Ienco; 2. Brenda Bates	3,434	0.4	+0.4
Independent Save the Unborn	Trevor Grace	2,674	0.3	+0.3
Independent Christians for Voluntary Euthanasia	1. Ian Wood; 2. Craig de Vos	2,379	0.2	+0.2
Independent Less Tax	1. Stewart Glass; 2. Michael Noack	1,713	0.2	+0.2
United Party	1. Darian Hiles; 2. Deb Munro	1,691	0.2	+0.2
Independent Social Environmental & Economic Justice	Michelle Drummond	1,559	0.2	+0.2
Independent SA Change	1. Lynette Crocker; 2. Dylan Coleman-Mastrosavas	1,460	0.2	+0.2
Independent Change is Necessary	1. Mark Aldridge; 2. Helen Aldridge	1,235	0.1	+0.1
Independent Water Environment Heritage	Garry Mighall	1,215	0.1	+0.1
Independent Indigenous	Joseph Williams	900	0.1	+0.1
Independent Law and Order	Frank Williams	767	0.1	+0.1
Independent Parklands and Heritage	Kelly Henderson	701	0.1	+0.1
Independent C.A.R.S	Peter Panagaris	600	0.1	+0.1
Independent No Desal No Dams	1. John Tregenza; 2. Corrie Vanderhoek	477	0.05	+0.05
Independent MAGS 2010	Joe Carbone	376	0.04	+0.04
Independent Ultra Progressive	Howard Coombe	88	0.01	+0.01
Total formal votes		956,672	94.2	−0.6
Informal votes		58,714	5.8	+0.6
Turnout		1,015,386	92.9	−0.2

- Dr Paul Collier died on 9 March 2010. His name remained on the ballot paper, and electors who cast a vote for him had their vote redirected to their next preference.

== See also ==
- Candidates of the 2010 South Australian state election
- Members of the South Australian Legislative Council, 2010–2014
