= Results of the 2010 South Australian state election (House of Assembly) =

South Australian state election, 20 March 2010 House of Assembly << 2006–2014 >>
Enrolled voters	1,093,316				
Votes cast	1,014,431		Turnout	92.78	+0.47
Informal votes	33,762		Informal	3.33	–0.27
Summary of votes by party
Party	Primary votes	%	Swing	Seats	Change
Liberal	408,482	41.65	+7.68	18	+ 3
Labor	367,480	37.47	–7.75	26	– 2
Greens	79,535	8.11	+1.62	0	± 0
Family First	52,769	5.38	–0.50	0	± 0
National	10,279	1.05	–1.04	0	– 1
Democrats	3,682	0.38	–2.52	0	± 0
Independent	46,108	4.70	+2.73	3	± 0
Other	12,334	1.26	*	0	± 0
Total	980,669			47	
Two-party-preferred
Labor	474,535	48.39	–8.39		
Liberal	506,134	51.61	+8.39		

This is a list of House of Assembly results for the 2010 South Australian state election.

== Results by district ==
=== Adelaide ===
2010 South Australian state election: Adelaide
Party	Candidate	Votes	%	±%
Liberal	Rachel Sanderson	8,956	44.5	+10.9
Labor	Jane Lomax-Smith	6,710	33.3	−14.5
Greens	Brett Ferris	2,344	11.7	+2.4
Save the RAH	Ruben Sebben	704	3.5	+3.5
Dignity for Disability	Samantha Paior	374	1.9	−0.4
Gamers 4 Croydon	Tom Birdseye	350	1.7	+1.7
Family First	Laury Bais	303	1.5	−1.2
Fair Land Tax	Nick Apostolou	282	1.4	+1.4
FREE Australia	Shaun McGrath	97	0.5	+0.5
Total formal votes		20,120	96.2	−0.1
Informal votes		787	3.8	+0.1
Turnout		20,907	90.0	+0.8
Two-party-preferred result
Liberal	Rachel Sanderson	10,909	54.2	+14.5
Labor	Jane Lomax-Smith	9,211	45.8	−14.5
Liberal gain from Labor		Swing	+14.5	

=== Ashford ===
2010 South Australian state election: Ashford
Party	Candidate	Votes	%	±%
Labor	Steph Key	9,218	43.5	−8.9
Liberal	Penny Pratt	8,220	38.7	+10.9
Greens	Jennifer Bonham	2,806	13.2	+3.8
Family First	Robyn Munro	969	4.6	−0.2
Total formal votes		21,213	96.8	
Informal votes		664	3.2	
Turnout		21,877	91.8	
Two-party-preferred result
Labor	Steph Key	11,625	54.8	−10.4
Liberal	Penny Pratt	9,588	45.2	+10.4
Labor hold		Swing	−10.4	

=== Bragg ===
2010 South Australian state election: Bragg
Party	Candidate	Votes	%	±%
Liberal	Vickie Chapman	13,726	64.0	+9.1
Labor	Ben Dineen	4,426	20.6	−6.0
Greens	Brendan Fitzgerald	2,679	12.5	+2.4
Family First	Nick Zollo	614	2.9	−1.0
Total formal votes		21,445	98.0	
Informal votes		416	2.0	
Turnout		21,861	92.4	
Two-party-preferred result
Liberal	Vickie Chapman	15,257	71.1	+9.1
Labor	Ben Dineen	6,188	28.9	−9.1
Liberal hold		Swing	+9.1	

=== Bright ===
2010 South Australian state election: Bright
Party	Candidate	Votes	%	±%
Liberal	Maria Kourtesis	9,415	44.0	+6.6
Labor	Chloë Fox	9,022	42.2	−5.4
Greens	Graham Goss	1,669	7.8	+0.9
Family First	Kevin Cramp	601	2.8	−1.3
Save the RAH	Meredith Stock	298	1.4	+1.4
Fair Land Tax	Nick Kalogiannis	194	0.9	+0.9
Independent	Shane Roos	188	0.9	+0.9
Total formal votes		21,387	96.9	
Informal votes		641	3.1	
Turnout		22,028	93.4	
Two-party-preferred result
Labor	Chloë Fox	10,777	50.4	−6.2
Liberal	Maria Kourtesis	10,610	49.6	+6.2
Labor hold		Swing	−6.2	

=== Chaffey ===
2010 South Australian state election: Chaffey
Party	Candidate	Votes	%	±%
Liberal	Tim Whetstone	8,958	44.7	+15.6
National	Karlene Maywald	7,310	36.5	−15.3
Family First	Jack Papageorgiou	1,535	7.7	+2.7
Labor	Roly Telfer	1,439	7.2	−3.1
Independent	David Peake	398	2.0	+2.0
Greens	James Jordan	395	2.0	−0.5
Total formal votes		20,035	96.8	
Informal votes		640	3.2	
Turnout		20,675	93.6	
Notional two-party-preferred count
Liberal	Tim Whetstone	15,580	77.8	+6.0
Labor	Roly Telfer	4,455	22.2	−6.0
Two-candidate-preferred result
Liberal	Tim Whetstone	10,770	53.8	+20.0
National	Karlene Maywald	9,265	46.2	−20.0
Liberal gain from National		Swing	+20.0	

=== Cheltenham ===
2010 South Australian state election: Cheltenham
Party	Candidate	Votes	%	±%
Labor	Jay Weatherill	11,326	56.2	−6.9
Liberal	James Bourke	4,912	24.4	+7.2
Independent	Henrietta Child	1,551	7.7	+7.7
Greens	Paul Downton	1,280	6.3	+0.5
Family First	Walter Shigrov	1,091	5.4	−4.1
Total formal votes		20,160	95.4	
Informal votes		908	4.6	
Turnout		21,068	92.8	
Two-party-preferred result
Labor	Jay Weatherill	13,327	66.1	−9.4
Liberal	James Bourke	6,833	33.9	+9.4
Labor hold		Swing	−9.4	

=== Colton ===
2010 South Australian state election: Colton
Party	Candidate	Votes	%	±%
Labor	Paul Caica	9,862	46.5	−11.2
Liberal	Peter Morichovitis	8,393	39.6	+10.1
Greens	Jim Douglas	1,735	8.2	+2.4
Family First	Denis Power	754	3.6	−0.7
Fair Land Tax	Yiannis Stamos	444	2.1	+2.1
Total formal votes		21,188	95.4	
Informal votes		956	4.6	
Turnout		22,144	94.2	
Two-party-preferred result
Labor	Paul Caica	11,432	54.0	−12.1
Liberal	Peter Morichovitis	9,756	46.0	+12.1
Labor hold		Swing	−12.1	

=== Croydon ===
2010 South Australian state election: Croydon
Party	Candidate	Votes	%	±%
Labor	Michael Atkinson	10,200	51.5	−15.6
Liberal	Zack McLennan	4,809	24.3	+5.0
Greens	James Hickey	1,743	8.8	−0.8
Independent	Max Galanti	1,143	5.8	+5.8
Gamers 4 Croydon	Kat Nicholson	726	3.7	+3.7
Family First	Alex Tennikoff	682	3.4	+3.4
Democrats	Shaun Yates	505	2.5	−1.5
Total formal votes		19,808	94.9	
Informal votes		1,002	5.1	
Turnout		20,810	92.6	
Two-party-preferred result
Labor	Michael Atkinson	12,702	64.1	−12.0
Liberal	Zack McLennan	7,106	35.9	+12.0
Labor hold		Swing	−12.0	

=== Davenport ===
2010 South Australian state election: Davenport
Party	Candidate	Votes	%	±%
Liberal	Iain Evans	10,648	52.0	+3.7
Labor	James Wangmann	5,134	25.1	−5.8
Greens	Nat Elliott	2,892	14.1	+2.7
Family First	Natasha Burfield	808	3.9	−0.6
Independent	Robert de Jonge	568	2.8	+2.8
Democrats	Bridgid Medder	408	2.0	−2.7
Total formal votes		20,458	97.3	
Informal votes		542	2.7	
Turnout		21,000	93.6	
Two-party-preferred result
Liberal	Iain Evans	12,642	61.8	+5.5
Labor	James Wangmann	7,816	38.2	−5.5
Liberal hold		Swing	+5.5	

=== Elder ===
2010 South Australian state election: Elder
Party	Candidate	Votes	%	±%
Labor	Patrick Conlon	8,805	43.3	−10.4
Liberal	Ben Turner	7,691	37.8	+10.4
Greens	Daryl Bullen	2,408	11.8	+5.4
Family First	Wendy Hay	1,003	4.9	−0.5
Democrats	Greg Croke	437	2.1	−0.7
Total formal votes		20,344	96.1	
Informal votes		791	3.9	
Turnout		21,135	92.4	
Two-party-preferred result
Labor	Patrick Conlon	10,904	53.6	−12.0
Liberal	Ben Turner	9,440	46.4	+12.0
Labor hold		Swing	−12.0	

=== Enfield ===
2010 South Australian state election: Enfield
Party	Candidate	Votes	%	±%
Labor	John Rau	10,506	52.6	−10.8
Liberal	Luke Westley	6,222	31.1	+10.0
Greens	Robert Simms	1,601	8.0	+1.8
Family First	Brett Dewey	1,214	6.1	+0.4
Independent	Andrew Stanko	432	2.2	+2.2
Total formal votes		19,975	95.8	
Informal votes		876	4.2	
Turnout		20,851	91.3	
Two-party-preferred result
Labor	John Rau	12,094	60.5	−14.0
Liberal	Luke Westley	7,781	39.5	+14.0
Labor hold		Swing	−14.0	

=== Finniss ===
2010 South Australian state election: Finniss
Party	Candidate	Votes	%	±%
Liberal	Michael Pengilly	10,450	51.5	+13.3
Labor	Mary-Louise Corcoran	6,134	30.2	−0.7
Family First	Bruce Hicks	1,736	8.6	+2.6
Greens	Diane Atkinson	1,733	8.5	+0.6
Independent	Maris Zalups	246	1.2	+1.2
Total formal votes		20,299	97.4	
Informal votes		472	2.6	
Turnout		20,771	93.2	
Two-party-preferred result
Liberal	Michael Pengilly	12,421	61.2	+5.8
Labor	Mary-Louise Corcoran	7,878	38.8	−5.8
Liberal hold		Swing	+5.8	

=== Fisher ===
2010 South Australian state election: Fisher
Party	Candidate	Votes	%	±%
Independent	Bob Such	9,094	40.8	−1.8
Liberal	Christopher Moriarty	5,976	26.8	+6.7
Labor	Adriana Christopoulos	4,986	22.4	−4.0
Greens	Penny Wright	1,210	5.4	+1.4
Family First	Trish Nolan	996	4.5	−0.7
Total formal votes		22,262	96.9	
Informal votes		671	3.1	
Turnout		22,933	94.1	
Notional two-party-preferred count
Liberal	Christopher Moriarty	11,548	51.9	+10.3
Labor	Adriana Christopoulos	10,714	48.1	−10.3
Two-candidate-preferred result
Independent	Bob Such	14,831	66.6	+0.7
Liberal	Christopher Moriarty	7,431	33.4	+33.4
Independent hold		Swing	N/A	

=== Flinders ===
2010 South Australian state election: Flinders
Party	Candidate	Votes	%	±%
Liberal	Peter Treloar	11,689	58.0	+4.0
Labor	Tauto Sansbury	3,129	15.5	+2.7
National	Wilbur Klein	2,969	14.7	−8.6
Greens	Felicity Wright	1,394	6.9	+2.9
Family First	Grant Wilson	979	4.9	+0.7
Total formal votes		20,160	97.1	
Informal votes		565	2.9	
Turnout		20,725	91.1	
Two-party-preferred result
Liberal	Peter Treloar	15,361	76.2	+15.2
Labor	Tauto Sansbury	4,799	23.8	+23.8
Liberal hold		Swing	N/A	

=== Florey ===
2010 South Australian state election: Florey
Party	Candidate	Votes	%	±%
Labor	Frances Bedford	9,339	44.9	−7.7
Liberal	Pat Trainor	7,811	37.6	+7.0
Family First	Andrew Graham	1,380	6.6	−0.8
Greens	Craig McKay	1,347	6.5	+0.8
Save the RAH	Denes Marantos	905	4.4	+4.4
Total formal votes		20,782	96.3	
Informal votes		756	3.7	
Turnout		21,538	93.7	
Two-party-preferred result
Labor	Frances Bedford	11,132	53.6	−8.5
Liberal	Pat Trainor	9,650	46.4	+8.5
Labor hold		Swing	−8.5	

=== Frome ===
2010 South Australian state election: Frome
Party	Candidate	Votes	%	±%
Independent	Geoff Brock	7,965	37.7	+37.7
Liberal	Terry Boylan	7,713	36.5	−12.0
Labor	John Rohde	3,900	18.5	−22.0
Greens	Joy O'Brien	644	3.1	−0.7
Family First	John McComb	561	2.7	−2.5
Save the RAH	Max Van Dissel	328	1.6	+1.6
Total formal votes		21,111	97.2	
Informal votes		587	2.8	
Turnout		21,698	94.8	
Notional two-party-preferred count
Labor	John Rohde	10,585	50.1	+1.8
Liberal	Terry Boylan	10,526	49.9	−1.8
Two-candidate-preferred result
Independent	Geoff Brock	12,281	58.2	+6.5
Liberal	Terry Boylan	8,830	41.8	−6.5
Independent hold		Swing	+6.5	

=== Giles ===
2010 South Australian state election: Giles
Party	Candidate	Votes	%	±%
Labor	Lyn Breuer	9,943	52.6	−7.3
Liberal	Chad Oldfield	5,333	29.3	+1.0
Greens	Andrew Melville-Smith	2,290	12.1	+7.6
Family First	Cheryl Kaminski	1,134	6.0	+0.1
Total formal votes		18,900	96.2	
Informal votes		693	3.8	
Turnout		19,593	88.1	
Two-party-preferred result
Labor	Lyn Breuer	11,696	61.9	−4.5
Liberal	Chad Oldfield	7,204	38.1	+4.5
Labor hold		Swing	−4.5	

=== Goyder ===
2010 South Australian state election: Goyder
Party	Candidate	Votes	%	±%
Liberal	Steven Griffiths	12,524	60.2	+10.5
Labor	Christopher Hansford	5,243	25.2	−7.7
Family First	Jill Lawrie	1,486	7.1	−0.5
Greens	Joy Forrest	1,046	5.0	+0.5
FREE Australia	Dave Munro	499	2.4	+2.4
Total formal votes		20,798	95.7	
Informal votes		856	4.3	
Turnout		21,654	93.7	
Two-party-preferred result
Liberal	Steven Griffiths	14,212	68.3	+9.4
Labor	Christopher Hansford	6,586	31.7	−9.4
Liberal hold		Swing	+9.4	

=== Hammond ===
2010 South Australian state election: Hammond
Party	Candidate	Votes	%	±%
Liberal	Adrian Pederick	13,340	61.8	+16.1
Labor	Hannah MacLeod	4,973	23.0	−4.7
Greens	Mark Byrne	1,735	8.0	+1.6
Family First	Joanne Fosdike	1,536	7.1	−1.4
Total formal votes		21,584	96.4	
Informal votes		731	3.6	
Turnout		22,315	92.8	
Two-party-preferred result
Liberal	Adrian Pederick	14,890	69.0	+8.1
Labor	Hannah McLeod	6,694	31.0	−8.1
Liberal hold		Swing	+8.1	

=== Hartley ===
2010 South Australian state election: Hartley
Party	Candidate	Votes	%	±%
Labor	Grace Portolesi	8,560	43.3	−3.3
Liberal	Joe Scalzi	8,104	41.0	+3.1
Greens	Keith Oehme	1,451	7.3	+1.0
Family First	Suzanne Neal	622	3.1	−1.3
Save the RAH	Robert Waltham	500	2.5	+2.5
Democratic Labor	Mark Freer	326	1.7	+1.7
Fair Land Tax	Natasha Marona	187	0.9	+0.9
Total formal votes		19,750	96.4	
Informal votes		696	3.6	
Turnout		20,446	92.1	
Two-party-preferred result
Labor	Grace Portolesi	10,322	52.3	−3.9
Liberal	Joe Scalzi	9,428	47.7	+3.9
Labor hold		Swing	−3.9	

=== Heysen ===
2010 South Australian state election: Heysen
Party	Candidate	Votes	%	±%
Liberal	Isobel Redmond	12,519	58.0	+13.7
Labor	Stephanie Gheller	4,278	19.8	−6.9
Greens	Lynton Vonow	3,662	17.0	+0.3
Family First	John Day	728	3.4	−3.1
Democrats	Andrew Castrique	416	1.9	−3.1
Total formal votes		21,603	97.2	
Informal votes		568	2.8	
Turnout		22,171	93.8	
Two-party-preferred result
Liberal	Isobel Redmond	14,368	66.5	+11.6
Labor	Stephanie Gheller	7,235	33.5	−11.6
Liberal hold		Swing	+11.6	

=== Kaurna ===
2010 South Australian state election: Kaurna
Party	Candidate	Votes	%	±%
Labor	John Hill	10,353	49.4	−10.5
Liberal	Trisha Bird	7,036	33.6	+12.9
Greens	Yvonne Wenham	1,771	8.5	+1.0
Family First	James Chappell	1,176	5.6	−1.2
Democrats	Marie Nicholls	365	1.7	−0.4
FREE Australia	Jason Wuttke	254	1.2	+1.2
Total formal votes		20,955	95.8	
Informal votes		751	4.2	
Turnout		21,706	92.3	
Two-party-preferred result
Labor	John Hill	12,290	58.6	−13.3
Liberal	Trisha Bird	8,665	41.4	+13.3
Labor hold		Swing	−13.3	

=== Kavel ===
2010 South Australian state election: Kavel
Party	Candidate	Votes	%	±%
Liberal	Mark Goldsworthy	11,389	55.6	+12.4
Labor	John Fulbrook	4,861	23.7	−2.3
Greens	Ian Grosser	2,604	12.7	+2.7
Family First	Colin Croft	1,110	5.4	−9.8
Democrats	Kathy Brazher-de Laine	529	2.6	−1.3
Total formal votes		20,493	96.8	
Informal votes		602	3.2	
Turnout		21,095	92.8	
Two-party-preferred result
Liberal	Mark Goldsworthy	13,486	65.8	+7.8
Labor	John Fulbrook	7,007	34.2	−7.8
Liberal hold		Swing	+7.8	

=== Lee ===
2010 South Australian state election: Lee
Party	Candidate	Votes	%	±%
Labor	Michael Wright	9,734	46.3	−12.4
Liberal	Sue Gow	7,263	34.5	+9.0
Greens	Yesha Joshi	1,716	8.2	+0.2
Family First	Richard Bunting	767	3.6	−0.8
Independent	Bob Briton	608	2.9	+2.9
Independent	Colin Thomas	492	2.3	+2.3
Independent	Joe Rossi	455	2.2	+2.2
Total formal votes		21,035	95.3	
Informal votes		976	4.7	
Turnout		22,011	93.0	
Two-party-preferred result
Labor	Michael Wright	12,008	57.1	−12.7
Liberal	Sue Gow	9,027	42.9	+12.7
Labor hold		Swing	−12.7	

=== Light ===
2010 South Australian state election: Light
Party	Candidate	Votes	%	±%
Labor	Tony Piccolo	10,077	48.5	+3.8
Liberal	Cosie Costa	7,899	38.0	−1.8
Greens	Penny Johnston	1,088	5.2	+0.3
Family First	Tony Bates	906	4.4	−2.4
Save the RAH	Simon Stewart-Rattray	458	2.2	+2.2
Gamers 4 Croydon	Matthew Allpress	216	1.0	+1.0
Fair Land Tax	Lachlan Hetherington	150	0.7	+0.7
Total formal votes		20,794	95.8	
Informal votes		758	4.2	
Turnout		21,552	92.9	
Two-party-preferred result
Labor	Tony Piccolo	11,499	55.3	+3.2
Liberal	Cosie Costa	9,295	44.7	−3.2
Labor hold		Swing	+3.2	

=== Little Para ===
2010 South Australian state election: Little Para
Party	Candidate	Votes	%	±%
Labor	Lee Odenwalder	10,332	47.5	−8.4
Liberal	Franz Knoll	7,583	34.9	+10.4
Family First	David Somerville	2,205	10.1	+1.2
Greens	Paul Sharpe	1,612	7.4	+2.7
Total formal votes		21,732	96.3	
Informal votes		784	3.7	
Turnout		22,516	92.4	
Two-party-preferred result
Labor	Lee Odenwalder	12,313	56.7	−10.6
Liberal	Franz Knoll	9,419	43.3	+10.6
Labor hold		Swing	−10.6	

=== MacKillop ===
2010 South Australian state election: MacKillop
Party	Candidate	Votes	%	±%
Liberal	Mitch Williams	12,267	60.9	+0.9
Independent	Darren O'Halloran	3,463	17.2	+17.2
Labor	Simone McDonnell	2,497	12.4	−8.8
Family First	Jenene Childs	1,199	6.0	−1.0
Greens	Andrew Jennings	718	3.6	−0.6
Total formal votes		20,144	97.2	
Informal votes		572	2.8	
Turnout		20,716	93.0	
Notional two-party-preferred count
Liberal	Mitch Williams	15,161	75.3	+3.6
Labor	Simone McDonnell	4,983	24.7	−3.6
Two-candidate-preferred result
Liberal	Mitch Williams	14,112	70.1	−2.1
Independent	Darren O'Halloran	6,032	29.9	+29.9
Liberal hold		Swing	N/A	

=== Mawson ===
2010 South Australian state election: Mawson
Party	Candidate	Votes	%	±%
Labor	Leon Bignell	9,849	45.9	+2.1
Liberal	Matt Donovan	7,642	35.6	−4.3
Family First	Andrew Tainsh	1,570	7.3	+0.8
Greens	Palitja Moore	1,387	6.5	+1.4
Gamers 4 Croydon	Ben Ernst	413	1.9	+1.9
Save the RAH	David Senior	259	1.2	+1.2
Independent	Michael Lee	168	0.8	+0.8
Fair Land Tax	Harry Tsekouras	155	0.7	+0.7
Total formal votes		21,443	95.4	
Informal votes		941	4.6	
Turnout		22,384	93.5	
Two-party-preferred result
Labor	Leon Bignell	11,659	54.4	+2.2
Liberal	Matt Donovan	9,784	45.6	−2.2
Labor hold		Swing	+2.2	

=== Mitchell ===
2010 South Australian state election: Mitchell
Party	Candidate	Votes	%	±%
Labor	Alan Sibbons	7,545	33.9	−9.1
Liberal	Peta McCance	6,386	28.7	+6.4
Independent	Kris Hanna	6,237	28.0	+7.7
Greens	Jeremy Miller	1,125	5.1	+1.3
Family First	Colin Gibson	950	4.3	−1.7
Total formal votes		22,243	96.6	
Informal votes		700	3.4	
Turnout		22,943	94.0	
Two-party-preferred result
Labor	Alan Sibbons	11,597	52.1	+2.7
Liberal	Peta McCance	10,646	47.9	+47.9
Labor gain from Independent		Swing	N/A	

=== Morialta ===
2010 South Australian state election: Morialta
Party	Candidate	Votes	%	±%
Liberal	John Gardner	9,882	47.2	+10.9
Labor	Lindsay Simmons	8,011	38.3	−8.0
Greens	Scott Andrews	1,716	8.2	+1.4
Family First	Elizabeth Smit	824	3.9	−1.8
Save the RAH	Peter Maddern	500	2.4	+2.4
Total formal votes		20,933	96.9	
Informal votes		625	3.1	
Turnout		21,558	94.1	
Two-party-preferred result
Liberal	John Gardner	11,333	54.1	+11.1
Labor	Lindsay Simmons	9,600	45.9	−11.1
Liberal gain from Labor		Swing	+11.1	

=== Morphett ===
2010 South Australian state election: Morphett
Party	Candidate	Votes	%	±%
Liberal	Duncan McFetridge	11,660	55.4	+8.1
Labor	Tim Looker	6,595	31.3	−6.6
Greens	Jack Robins	1,993	9.5	+2.1
Family First	Helen Zafiriou	807	3.8	−0.5
Total formal votes		21,055	97.8	
Informal votes		479	2.4	
Turnout		21,534	92.5	
Two-party-preferred result
Liberal	Duncan McFetridge	12,856	61.1	+7.6
Labor	Tim Looker	8,199	38.9	−7.6
Liberal hold		Swing	+7.6	

=== Mount Gambier ===
2010 South Australian state election: Mount Gambier
Party	Candidate	Votes	%	±%
Liberal	Steve Perryman	9,282	42.6	+8.7
Independent	Don Pegler	7,842	36.0	+36.0
Labor	Viv Maher	2,724	12.5	−9.7
Family First	Henk Bruins	929	4.3	+0.2
Greens	Donella Peters	492	2.3	+0.4
Independent	Nick Fletcher	464	2.1	+2.1
Fair Land Tax	John Desyllas	48	0.2	+0.2
Total formal votes		21,781	96.1	
Informal votes		814	3.9	
Turnout		22,595	93.3	
Notional two-party-preferred count
Liberal	Steve Perryman	14,261	65.5	+9.9
Labor	Viv Maher	7,520	34.5	−9.9
Two-candidate-preferred result
Independent	Don Pegler	10,971	50.4	+50.4
Liberal	Steve Perryman	10,810	49.6	+5.8
Independent hold		Swing	N/A	

=== Napier ===
2010 South Australian state election: Napier
Party	Candidate	Votes	%	±%
Labor	Michael O'Brien	11,176	53.9	−7.1
Liberal	Brenton Chomel	5,497	26.5	+7.4
Family First	Gary Balfort	2,162	10.4	−0.2
Greens	Louise Rodbourn	1,257	6.1	+0.4
Independent	Wayne Rich	661	3.2	+3.2
Total formal votes		20,753	95.3	
Informal votes		916	4.7	
Turnout		21,669	91.3	
Two-party-preferred result
Labor	Michael O'Brien	13,646	65.8	−8.2
Liberal	Brenton Chomel	7,107	34.2	+8.2
Labor hold		Swing	−8.2	

=== Newland ===
2010 South Australian state election: Newland
Party	Candidate	Votes	%	±%
Labor	Tom Kenyon	8,886	42.8	−3.4
Liberal	Trish Draper	7,980	38.4	+4.3
Greens	Holden Ward	1,585	7.6	+2.2
Family First	Dale Clegg	1,308	6.3	−0.7
Save the RAH	Suren Krishnan	463	2.2	+2.2
Independent	Ryan Haby	377	1.8	+1.8
Fair Land Tax	Jim Zavros	183	0.9	+0.9
Total formal votes		21,357	93.4	+1.6
Informal votes		575	2.8	−1.6
Turnout		21,932	95.9	+2.1
Two-party-preferred result
Labor	Tom Kenyon	10,841	52.2	−4.6
Liberal	Trish Draper	9,941	47.8	+4.6
Labor hold		Swing	−4.6	

=== Norwood ===
2010 South Australian state election: Norwood
Party	Candidate	Votes	%	±%
Liberal	Steven Marshall	9,844	46.3	+5.7
Labor	Vini Ciccarello	7,184	33.8	−8.1
Greens	Katie McCusker	2,498	11.8	+3.0
Save the RAH	Philip Harding	489	2.3	+2.3
Family First	Paul Theofanous	413	1.9	−0.7
Dignity for Disability	Rick Neagle	392	1.8	+0.5
Gamers 4 Croydon	David Egge	258	1.2	+1.2
Fair Land Tax	Pamela Anders	177	0.8	+0.8
Total formal votes		21,255	96.4	
Informal votes		746	3.6	
Turnout		22,001	91.7	
Two-party-preferred result
Liberal	Steven Marshall	11,667	54.9	+8.8
Labor	Vini Ciccarello	9,588	45.1	−8.8
Liberal gain from Labor		Swing	+8.8	

=== Playford ===
2010 South Australian state election: Playford
Party	Candidate	Votes	%	±%
Labor	Jack Snelling	11,292	54.5	−9.5
Liberal	Kerry Faggotter	5,892	28.4	+9.3
Family First	Steve Ambler	1,349	6.5	−1.7
Greens	Dion Ashenden	1,116	5.4	+0.4
FREE Australia	Frank Feldmann	647	3.1	+3.1
Democrats	Andrew Woon	435	2.1	−1.6
Total formal votes		20,731	95.6	
Informal votes		903	4.4	
Turnout		21,634	92.9	
Two-party-preferred result
Labor	Jack Snelling	13,734	66.2	−9.5
Liberal	Kerry Faggotter	6,997	33.8	+9.5
Labor hold		Swing	−9.5	

=== Port Adelaide ===
2010 South Australian state election: Port Adelaide
Party	Candidate	Votes	%	±%
Labor	Kevin Foley	10,854	49.9	−14.4
Liberal	Sue Lawrie	5,831	26.8	+8.6
Independent	Max James	2,398	11.0	+11.0
Greens	Marie Boland	1,368	6.3	+0.1
Family First	Bruce Hambour	1,281	5.9	−0.1
Total formal votes		21,732	95.9	
Informal votes		767	4.1	
Turnout		22,499	93.2	
Two-party-preferred result
Labor	Kevin Foley	13,643	62.8	−13.4
Liberal	Sue Lawrie	8,089	37.2	+13.4
Labor hold		Swing	−13.4	

=== Ramsay ===
2010 South Australian state election: Ramsay
Party	Candidate	Votes	%	±%
Labor	Mike Rann	11,446	57.9	−13.6
Liberal	David Balaza	4,927	24.9	+6.6
Family First	Dale Ramsey	1,900	9.6	+9.6
Greens	Paul Petit	903	4.6	−0.3
Democrats	Rod Steinert	587	3.0	−0.6
Total formal votes		19,763	95.3	
Informal votes		900	4.7	
Turnout		20,663	92.1	
Two-party-preferred result
Labor	Mike Rann	13,431	68.0	−10.5
Liberal	David Balaza	6,332	32.0	+10.5
Labor hold		Swing	−10.5	

=== Reynell ===
2010 South Australian state election: Reynell
Party	Candidate	Votes	%	±%
Labor	Gay Thompson	10,506	52.0	−6.6
Liberal	Shane Howard	6,228	30.8	+7.5
Family First	Geoff Doecke	1,812	9.0	+0.4
Greens	Lisa Adams	1,645	8.1	+3.4
Total formal votes		20,191	95.9	
Informal votes		818	4.1	
Turnout		21,009	93.2	
Two-party-preferred result
Labor	Gay Thompson	12,187	60.4	−8.1
Liberal	Shane Howard	8,004	39.6	+8.1
Labor hold		Swing	−8.1	

=== Schubert ===
2010 South Australian state election: Schubert
Party	Candidate	Votes	%	±%
Liberal	Ivan Venning	11,936	57.3	+9.3
Labor	Lynda Hopgood	4,772	22.9	−11.0
Greens	Jasemin Rose	1,902	9.1	+2.1
Family First	James Troup	1,355	6.5	−1.2
Independent	William Smidmore	862	4.1	+4.1
Total formal votes		20,827	96.4	
Informal votes		723	3.6	
Turnout		21,550	94.8	
Two-party-preferred result
Liberal	Ivan Venning	14,113	67.8	+11.0
Labor	Lynda Hopgood	6,714	32.2	−11.0
Liberal hold		Swing	+11.0	

=== Stuart ===
2010 South Australian state election: Stuart
Party	Candidate	Votes	%	±%
Liberal	Dan van Holst Pellekaan	10,929	52.4	+6.7
Labor	Sean Holden	7,455	35.8	−8.0
Greens	Jane Alcorn	1,019	4.9	+1.3
Family First	Sylvia Holland	951	4.6	+0.0
Independent	Rob Williams	497	2.4	+2.4
Total formal votes		20,851	97.0	
Informal votes		624	3.0	
Turnout		21,475	92.0	
Two-party-preferred result
Liberal	Dan van Holst Pellekaan	12,015	57.6	+7.1
Labor	Sean Holden	8,836	42.4	−7.1
Liberal hold		Swing	+7.1	

=== Taylor ===
2010 South Australian state election: Taylor
Party	Candidate	Votes	%	±%
Labor	Leesa Vlahos	11,755	53.5	−13.4
Liberal	Cassandra Ludwig	6,580	29.9	+11.5
Family First	Paul Coombe	2,324	10.6	+2.2
Greens	Kirsten Wahlstrom	1,326	6.0	+2.1
Total formal votes		21,985	95.1	
Informal votes		966	4.9	
Turnout		22,951	93.0	
Two-party-preferred result
Labor	Leesa Vlahos	13,429	61.1	−15.4
Liberal	Cassandra Ludwig	8,556	38.9	+15.4
Labor hold		Swing	−15.4	

=== Torrens ===
2010 South Australian state election: Torrens
Party	Candidate	Votes	%	±%
Labor	Robyn Geraghty	10,265	49.4	−9.4
Liberal	Stuart Lomax	7,292	35.1	+11.0
Greens	Peter Fiebig	1,657	8.0	+1.5
Family First	Owen Hood	1,575	7.6	+0.3
Total formal votes		20,789	96.4	
Informal votes		710	3.6	
Turnout		21,499	92.0	
Two-party-preferred result
Labor	Robyn Geraghty	11,988	57.7	−11.5
Liberal	Stuart Lomax	8,801	42.3	+11.5
Labor hold		Swing	−11.5	

=== Unley ===
2010 South Australian state election: Unley
Party	Candidate	Votes	%	±%
Liberal	David Pisoni	11,691	56.8	+10.4
Labor	Vanessa Vartto	5,774	28.1	−8.5
Greens	Nikki Mortier	2,711	13.2	+3.6
Family First	Luke Smolucha	396	1.9	−0.7
Total formal votes		20,572	98.3	
Informal votes		335	1.7	
Turnout		20,907	91.6	
Two-party-preferred result
Liberal	David Pisoni	12,804	62.2	+10.3
Labor	Vanessa Vartto	7,768	37.8	−10.3
Liberal hold		Swing	+10.3	

=== Waite ===
2010 South Australian state election: Waite
Party	Candidate	Votes	%	±%
Liberal	Martin Hamilton-Smith	12,166	56.1	+9.1
Labor	Adrian Tisato	5,997	27.6	−6.0
Greens	Matt Wilson	2,899	13.4	+2.8
Family First	John Vottari	631	2.9	−1.3
Total formal votes		21,693	97.8	
Informal votes		455	2.2	
Turnout		22,148	93.07	
Two-party-preferred result
Liberal	Martin Hamilton-Smith	13,636	62.9	+8.8
Labor	Adrian Tisato	8,057	37.1	−8.8
Liberal hold		Swing	+8.8	

=== West Torrens ===
2010 South Australian state election: West Torrens
Party	Candidate	Votes	%	±%
Labor	Tom Koutsantonis	9,684	47.3	−9.3
Liberal	Jassmine Wood	7,449	36.4	+9.5
Greens	Tim White	2,232	10.9	+2.6
Family First	David Beattie	636	3.1	−1.9
Save the RAH	Kon Briggs	477	2.3	+2.3
Total formal votes		20,478	96.4	
Informal votes		711	3.6	
Turnout		21,189	92.2	
Two-party-preferred result
Labor	Tom Koutsantonis	11,613	56.7	−11.5
Liberal	Jassmine Wood	8,865	43.3	+11.5
Labor hold		Swing	−11.5	

=== Wright ===
2010 South Australian state election: Wright
Party	Candidate	Votes	%	±%
Labor	Jennifer Rankine	10,688	48.1	−9.4
Liberal	Tina Celeste	8,309	37.4	+10.7
Family First	Mark Potter	1,488	6.7	−0.6
Greens	Arthur Seager	1,132	5.1	+1.2
Dignity for Disability	Garry Connor	581	2.6	+0.2
Total formal votes		22,198	93.9	
Informal votes		1,283	6.1	
Turnout		23,481	96.2	
Two-party-preferred result
Labor	Jennifer Rankine	12,126	54.6	−10.7
Liberal	Tina Celeste	10,072	45.4	+10.7
Labor hold		Swing	−10.7	

== See also ==
- Candidates of the 2010 South Australian state election
- Members of the South Australian House of Assembly, 2010–2014
