= Candidates of the 2010 South Australian state election =

This is a list of candidates of the 2010 South Australian state election.

== Retiring MPs ==
=== Liberal ===
- Graham Gunn MHA (Stuart)
- Liz Penfold MHA (Flinders)
- Robert Lawson MLC
- Caroline Schaefer MLC

=== Labor ===
- Lea Stevens MHA (Little Para)
- Trish White MHA (Taylor)

=== Independent ===
- Rory McEwen MHA (Mount Gambier)

== House of Assembly ==
Sitting members are shown in bold text. Successful candidates are highlighted in the relevant colour. Where there is possible confusion, an asterisk (*) is also used.

Electorate	Held by	Labor candidate	Liberal candidate	Greens candidate	Family First candidate	Other candidates
Adelaide	Labor	**Jane Lomax-Smith**	Rachel Sanderson	Brett Ferris	Laury Bais	Nick Apostolou (FLT); Tom Birdseye (G4C); Shaun McGrath (FREE); Samantha Paior (D4D); Reuben Sebben (SRAH)
Ashford	Labor	**Stephanie Key**	Penny Pratt	Jennifer Bonham	Robyn Munro	
Bragg	Liberal	Ben Dineen	**Vickie Chapman**	Brendan Fitzgerald	Nick Zollo	
Bright	Labor	**Chloë Fox**	Maria Kourtesis	Graham Goss	Kevin Cramp	Nick Kalogiannis (FLT); Shane Roos (Ind); Meredith Louise Stock (SRAH)
Chaffey	National	Roland Telfer	Tim Whetstone	James Jordan	Jack Papageorgiou	**Karlene Maywald** (Nat); David Peake (Ind)
Cheltenham	Labor	**Jay Weatherill**	James Bourke	Paul Downton	Walter Shigrov	Henrietta Child (Ind)
Colton	Labor	**Paul Caica**	Peter Morichovitis	Jim Douglas	Dennis Power	Yiannis Stamos (FLT)
Croydon	Labor	**Michael Atkinson**	Zack McLennan	James Hickey	Alex Tennikoff	Max Galanti (Ind); Kat Nicholson (G4C); Shaun Yates (Dem)
Davenport	Liberal	James Wangmann	**Iain Evans**	Nat Elliott	Natasha Burfield	Robert De Jonge (Ind); Bridgid Medder (Dem)
Elder	Labor	**Patrick Conlon**	Ben Turner	Daryl Bullen	Wendy Hay	Greg Croke (Dem)
Enfield	Labor	**John Rau**	Luke Westley	Robert Simms	Brett Dewey	Andrew Stanko (Ind)
Finniss	Liberal	Mary-Louise Corcoran	**Michael Pengilly**	Diane Atkinson	Bruce Hicks	Maris Zalups (Ind)
Fisher	Independent	Adriana Christopoulos	Christopher Moriarty	Penny Wright	Trish Nolan	**Bob Such** (Ind)
Flinders	Liberal	Tauto Sansbury	Peter Treloar	Felicity Wright	Grant Wilson	Wilbur Klein (Nat)
Florey	Labor	**Frances Bedford**	Patrick Trainor	Craig McKay	Andrew Graham	Denes Marantos (SRAH)
Frome	Independent	John Rohde	Terry Boylan	Joy O'Brien	John McComb	**Geoff Brock*** (Ind); Max Van Dissel (SRAH)
Giles	Labor	**Lyn Breuer**	Chad Oldfield	Andrew Melville-Smith	Cheryl Kaminski	
Goyder	Liberal	Christopher Hansford	**Steven Griffiths**	Joy Forrest	Jill Lawrie	Dave Munro (FREE)
Hammond	Liberal	Hannah Macleod	**Adrian Pederick**	Mark Byrne	Joanne Fosdike	
Hartley	Labor	**Grace Portolesi**	Joe Scalzi	Keith Oehme	Sue Neal	Mark Freer (DLP); Natasha Marona (FLT); Robert Waltham (SRAH)
Heysen	Liberal	Stephanie Gheller	**Isobel Redmond**	Lynton Vonow	John Day	Andrew Castrique (Dem)
Kaurna	Labor	**John Hill**	Trisha Bird	Yvonne Wenham	James Chappell	Marie Nicholls (Dem); Jason Wuttke (FREE)
Kavel	Liberal	John Fulbrook	**Mark Goldsworthy**	Ian Grosser	Colin Croft	Kathy Brazher-Delaine (Dem)
Lee	Labor	**Michael Wright**	Sue Gow	Yesha Joshi	Richard Bunting	Bob Briton (Ind); Joe Rossi (Ind); Colin Thomas (Ind)
Light	Labor	**Tony Piccolo**	Cosie Costa	Penny Johnston	Tony Bates	Matt Allpress (G4C); Lachlan Hetherington (FLT); Simon Stewart-Rattray (SRAH)
Little Para	Labor	Lee Odenwalder	Franz Knoll	Paul Sharpe	David Somerville	
MacKillop	Liberal	Simone McDonnell	**Mitch Williams**	Andrew Jennings	Jenene Childs	Darren O'Halloran (Ind)
Mawson	Labor	**Leon Bignell**	Matthew Donovan	Palitja Moore	Andrew Tainsh	Ben Ernst (G4C); Michael Lee (Ind); David Senior (SRAH); Harry Tsekouras (FLT)
Mitchell	Independent	Alan Sibbons	Peta McCance	Jeremy Miller	Colin Gibson	**Kris Hanna** (Ind)
Morialta	Labor	**Lindsay Simmons**	John Gardner	Scott Andrews	Elizabeth Smit	Peter Maddern (SRAH)
Morphett	Liberal	Tim Looker	**Duncan McFetridge**	Jack Robbins	Helen Zafiriou	
Mount Gambier	Independent	Viv Maher	Steve Perryman	Donella Peters	Henk Bruins	Nick Fletcher (Ind); John Desyllas (FLT); Don Pegler* (Ind)
Napier	Labor	**Michael O'Brien**	Brenton Chomel	Louise Rodbourn	Gary Balfort	Wayne Rich (Ind)
Newland	Labor	**Tom Kenyon**	Trish Draper	Holden Ward	Dale Clegg	Suren Krishnan (SRAH); Ryan Haby (Ind); Jim Zavos (FLT)
Norwood	Labor	**Vini Ciccarello**	Steven Marshall	Katie McCusker	Paul Theofanous	Pamela Anders (FLT); David Egge (G4C); Philip Harding (SRAH); Rick Neagle (D4D)
Playford	Labor	**Jack Snelling**	Kerry Faggotter	Dion Ashenden	Steve Ambler	Frank Felmann (FREE); Andrew Woon (Dem)
Port Adelaide	Labor	**Kevin Foley**	Sue Lawrie	Marie Boland	Bruce Hambour	Max James (Ind)
Ramsay	Labor	**Mike Rann**	David Balaza	Paul Petit	Dale Ramsey	Rod Steinert (Dem)
Reynell	Labor	**Gay Thompson**	Shane Howard	Lisa Adams	Geoff Doecke	
Schubert	Liberal	Lynda Hopgood	**Ivan Venning**	Terry Allen	James Troup	William Simidmore (Ind)
Stuart	Liberal	Sean Holden	Dan van Holst Pellekaan	Jane Alcorn	Sylvia Holland	Rob Williams (Ind)
Taylor	Labor	Leesa Vlahos	Cassandra Ludwig	Kirsten Wahlstrom	Paul Coombe	
Torrens	Labor	**Robyn Geraghty**	Stuart Lomax	Peter Fiebig	Owen Hood	
Unley	Liberal	Vanessa Vartto	**David Pisoni**	Nikki Mortier	Luke Smolucha	
Waite	Liberal	Adrian Tisato	**Martin Hamilton-Smith**	Matthew Wilson	John Vottari	
West Torrens	Labor	**Tom Koutsantonis**	Jassmine Wood	Tim White	David Beattie	Kon Briggs (SRAH)
Wright	Labor	**Jennifer Rankine**	Tina Celeste	Arthur Seager	Mark Potter	Garry Connor (D4D)
**Source – Antony Green: ABC**

== Legislative Council ==
Sitting members are shown in bold text. Tickets that elected at least one MLC are highlighted in the relevant colour. Successful candidates are identified by an asterisk (*). Eleven of twenty-two seats were up for election. Labor were defending four seats. The Liberals were defending five seats. Family First and an ex-Democrat independent were defending one seat each.

Labor candidates	Liberal candidates	Greens candidates	Family First candidates	Democrats candidates	Winderlich candidates
1. **Paul Holloway***; 2. **Gail Gago***; 3. **Bernard Finnigan***; 4. **John Gazzola***; 5. Tung Ngo	1. **David Ridgway***; 2. **Stephen Wade***; 3. **Terry Stephens***; 4. Jing Lee*; 5. Rita Bouras; 6. Peter Salu; 7. Sarah Jared	1. Tammy Jennings*; 2. Simon Jones; 3. Sandy Montgomery	1. **Robert Brokenshire***; 2. Bob Randall; 3. Toni Turnbull	1. Jeanie Walker; 2. Tom Salerno; 3. Sandra Kanck	1. **David Winderlich**; 2. Kirsten Alexander
Dignity for Disability candidates	DLP candidates	Fair Land Tax candidates	FREE Australia candidates	Gamers 4 Croydon candidate	Nationals SA candidates
1. Paul Collier^{[1]}; 2. Kelly Vincent*; 3. Michele Thredgold; 4. Ronni Wood	1. Paul Russell; 2. David McCabe	1. George Kargiotis; 2. Andrew Haralampopoulos	1. Paul Kuhn; 2. Ki Meekins	1. Chris Prior	1. Deb Thiele; 2. Kym Webber
One Nation candidates	Save The RAH candidates	Shooters Party candidates	United candidates	Independent _{Climate Sceptics}	Independent _{Christian for Voluntary Euthanasia}
1. Robert Edmonds; 2. Barbara Pannach	1. Jim Katsaros; 2. Mark Taplin; 3. Ken Rollond; 4. David McGowan	1. Michael Hudson	1. Darian Hiles; 2. Deb Munro	1. Nathan Ashby; 2. Frank Hunt; 3. John Michelmore	1. Ian Wood; 2. Craig de Vos
Independent _{Mark Aldridge Change is Necessary}	Independent _{SA Change}	Independent _{SA Fishing and Lifestyle}	Independent _{Legalise Voluntary Euthanasia}	Independent _{Less Tax Stewart Glass}	Independent _{Joe Ienco Motorsport Land Tax}
1. Mark Aldridge; 2. Helen Aldridge	1. Lynette Crocker; 2. Dylan Coleman-Mastrosavas	1. Neil Armstrong; 2. Paul Tippins	1. Jenny Wheaton; 2. Denis Haynes	1. Stewart Glass; 2. Michael Noack	1. Joe Ienco; 2. Brenda Bates
Independent _{No Desal No Dams}	Single ticket candidates				
1. John Tregenza; 2. Corrie Vanderhoek	Joe Carbone; Howard Coombe; Michelle Drummond; Trevor Grace; Kelly Henderson	Doug McLaren; Gary Mitchall; Peter Panagaris; Frank Williams; Joseph Williams			
**Source – Antony Green: ABC**

=== Notes ===
^{1} Dr Paul Collier died on 9 March 2010. His name remained on the ballot paper, and electors who cast a vote for him had their vote redirected to their next preference.
