= Paul Collier (disambiguation) =

Sir Paul Collier (born 1949) is a professor of economics and public policy.

Paul Collier may also refer to:

- Paul Collier (snooker referee) (born 1970), Welsh snooker referee
- Paul Collier (activist) (died 2010), Australian disability activist and founder of the Dignity for Disability party
- Paul Collier (physicist), head of Beams Department at CERN
