= Members of the South Australian House of Assembly, 2010–2014 =

This is a list of members of the South Australian House of Assembly from 2010 to 2014, as elected at the 2010 state election and two 2012 by-elections.

Name	Party	Electorate	Term in office
Hon Michael Atkinson	Labor	Croydon	1989–2018
Frances Bedford	Labor	Florey	1997–2022
Zoe Bettison ^{[2]}	Labor	Ramsay	2012–present
Leon Bignell	Labor	Mawson	2006–2026
Lyn Breuer	Labor	Giles	1997–2014
Geoff Brock	Independent	Frome	2009–present
Hon Paul Caica	Labor	Colton	2002–2018
Vickie Chapman	Liberal	Bragg	2002–2022
Susan Close ^{[1]}	Labor	Port Adelaide	2012–2026
Hon Patrick Conlon	Labor	Elder	1997–2014
Hon Iain Evans	Liberal	Davenport	1993–2014
Hon Kevin Foley ^{[1]}	Labor	Port Adelaide	1993–2011
Chloë Fox	Labor	Bright	2006–2014
John Gardner	Liberal	Morialta	2010–2026
Robyn Geraghty	Labor	Torrens	1994–2014
Mark Goldsworthy	Liberal	Kavel	2002–2018
Steven Griffiths	Liberal	Goyder	2006–2018
Martin Hamilton-Smith	Liberal	Waite	1997–2018
Hon John Hill	Labor	Kaurna	1997–2014
Tom Kenyon	Labor	Newland	2006–2018
Hon Steph Key	Labor	Ashford	1997–2018
Tom Koutsantonis	Labor	West Torrens	1997–present
Dr Duncan McFetridge	Liberal	Morphett	2002–2018
Steven Marshall	Liberal	Norwood	2010–2024
Michael O'Brien	Labor	Napier	2002–2014
Lee Odenwalder	Labor	Little Para	2010–2026
Adrian Pederick	Liberal	Hammond	2006–2026
Don Pegler	Independent	Mount Gambier	2010–2014
Michael Pengilly	Liberal	Finniss	2006–2018
Tony Piccolo	Labor	Light	2006–2026
David Pisoni	Liberal	Unley	2006–2026
Grace Portolesi	Labor	Hartley	2006–2014
Hon Jennifer Rankine	Labor	Wright	1997–2018
Hon Mike Rann ^{[2]}	Labor	Ramsay	1985–2012
John Rau	Labor	Enfield	2002–2018
Isobel Redmond	Liberal	Heysen	2002–2018
Rachel Sanderson	Liberal	Adelaide	2010–2022
Alan Sibbons	Labor	Mitchell	2010–2014
Hon Jack Snelling	Labor	Playford	1997–2018
Hon Dr Bob Such	Independent	Fisher	1989–2014
Gay Thompson	Labor	Reynell	1997–2014
Peter Treloar	Liberal	Flinders	2010–2022
Dan van Holst Pellekaan	Liberal	Stuart	2010–2022
Ivan Venning	Liberal	Schubert	1990–2014
Leesa Vlahos	Labor	Taylor	2010–2018
Hon Jay Weatherill	Labor	Cheltenham	2002–2018
Tim Whetstone	Liberal	Chaffey	2010–present
Mitch Williams	Liberal	MacKillop	1997–2018
Hon Michael Wright	Labor	Lee	1997–2014

^{1} The Labor member for Port Adelaide, former Deputy Premier and Treasurer Kevin Foley, resigned on 12 December 2011. Labor candidate Susan Close won the resulting by-election on 11 February 2012.
^{2} The Labor member for Ramsay, former Premier Mike Rann, resigned on 13 January 2012. Labor candidate Zoe Bettison won the resulting by-election on 11 February 2012.
