= 2012 Ramsay state by-election =

- 11 February 2012

Electoral district of Ramsay in the South Australian House of Assembly
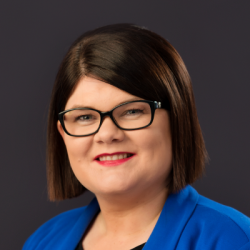

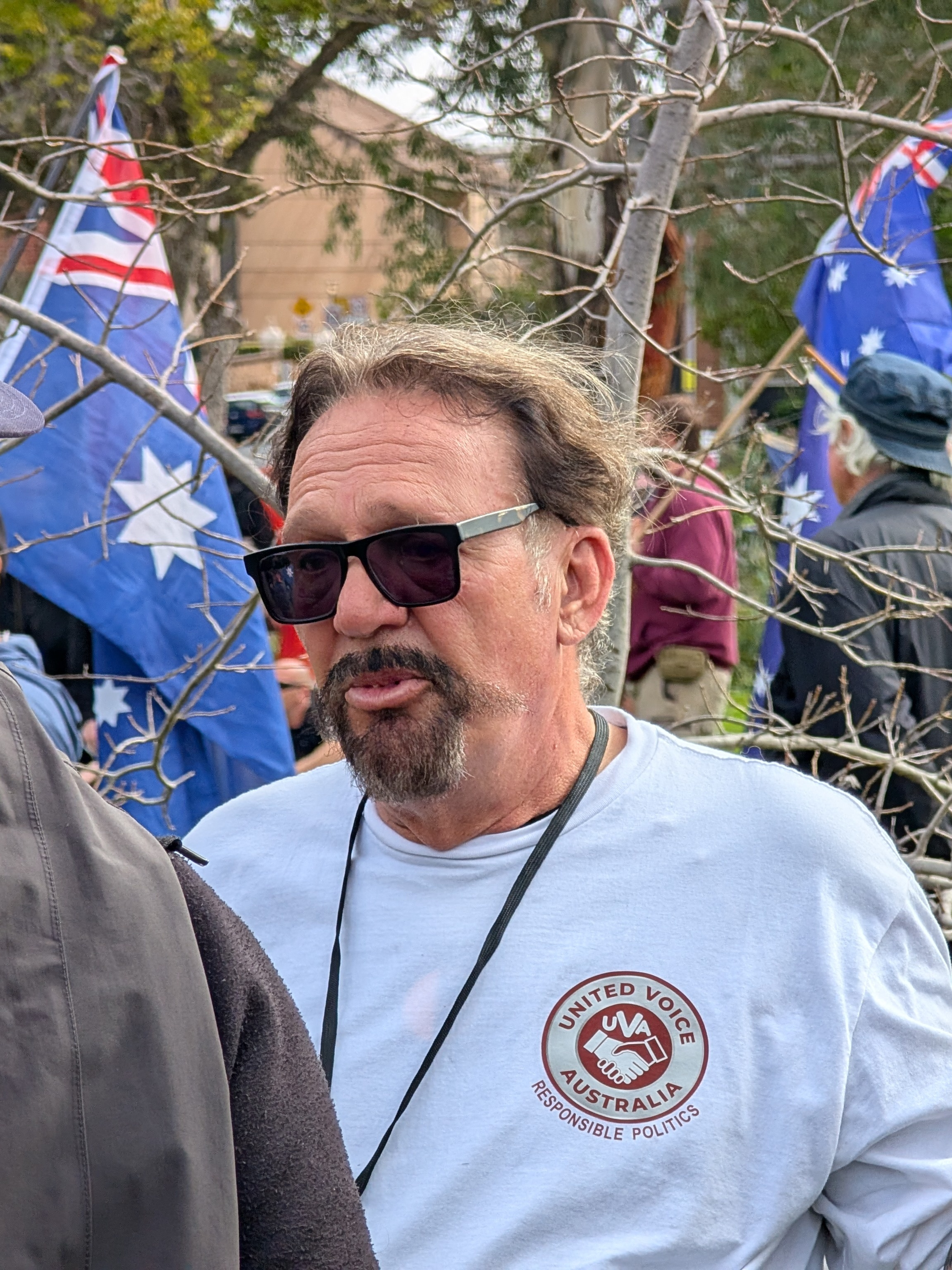

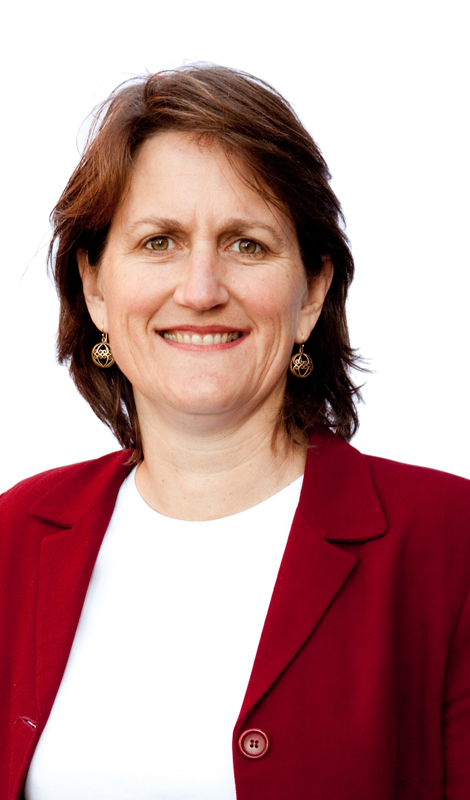
	First party	Second party
Candidate	Zoe Bettison	Mark Aldridge
Party	Labor	Independent
Primary vote	8,843	2,614
Percentage	54.6%	16.1%
Swing	▼3.3	▲16.1
TCP	66.7%	33.3%
TCP swing	▼1.3	▲33.3
	Third party	Fourth party
	LDP
Candidate	Christopher Steele	Ruth Beach
Party	Liberal Democrats	Greens
Primary vote	2,157	1,072
Percentage	13.3%	6.6%
Swing	▲13.3	▲2.0
MP before election
Mike Rann
Labor
Elected MP
Zoe Bettison
Labor

A by-election occurred in the South Australian House of Assembly seat of Ramsay on 11 February 2012. The seat was won by Labor candidate Zoe Bettison. The by-election was triggered by the resignation of Labor MHA and former premier Mike Rann.

== Background ==
Rann and Kevin Foley resigned from their parliamentary seats, which created twin by-elections for 11 February, the other being the 2012 Port Adelaide by-election. On two-party preferred margins of 18.0 percent and 12.8 percent from the 2010 election, considered safe margins on the previous pendulum, Labor would have likely retained both seats on the two-party preferred vote based on unchanged statewide Newspoll since the previous election. Ramsay was the safest of Labor's seats based on the previous election. In the lower house, 24 seats form a majority, the Labor government held 26 of 47 seats. If one or both seats were lost, Labor would still have retained majority government.

Rann was first elected as the member for the new northern metropolitan seat of Briggs at the 1985 election. From 1989 he held various ministries in the Bannon Labor government. Briggs was abolished in an electoral redistribution, with Rann moving to Ramsay in 1993. Rann was state Labor leader and leader of the opposition from 1994 after the Labor government was defeated a year earlier. Rann led Labor to minority government at the 2002 election, a landslide majority government at the 2006 election, and retained majority government at the 2010 election despite a swing. Rann stepped down in favour of Jay Weatherill as party leader and premier in 2011. Rann is the third-longest-serving Premier of South Australia and longest-serving South Australian Labor leader, and afterward became the longest-serving period of South Australian Labor government in history.

The last by-election was the 2009 Frome by-election, when another former premier, Rob Kerin, retired from politics. The seat was narrowly won by an independent candidate.

== Timeline ==
Date	Event
13 January 2012	Mike Rann resigned from the Parliament of South Australia.
13 January 2012	Writs were issued by the Speaker of the House of Assembly to proceed with a by-election.
23 January 2012	Enrolment on electoral rolls closed, with a total of 22,330 voters enrolled for the by-election.
27 January 2012	Candidate nominations closed and ballot order draw occurred, in line with s60(a) of the Electoral Act 1985.
11 February 2012	Polling day occurred between the hours of 8am and 6pm.
27 February 2012	Writ returned before this date for formal result declaration.

== Candidates ==
7 candidates in ballot paper order
Independent Voice of the Community	Mark Aldridge	Son of Salisbury mayor. Contested seats in multiple recent federal and state elections as an independent, and 2007 for One Nation.
SA Greens	Ruth Beach	Environmental, commercial and industrial lawyer, chair of an SA conservation NGO.
Independent Trevor Grace Save the Unborn	Trevor Grace	Endorsed candidate of the unregistered anti-abortionist Save the Unborn Party, contested upper house in 2010, and for the Family First Party in 2006.
Labor	Zoe Bettison	Former SDA organiser, NT Labor secretary and ministerial advisor, SA director of Hawker Britton.
One Nation	Chris Walsh	Plumber and partner of a horticultural business.
FREE Australia	Mark Lena	Electrician and data cabler.
Liberal Democrats	Christopher Steele	Owner and manager of advertising and audio businesses, wedding celebrant, contested federal seat of Adelaide in 2010.

The Liberal Party, Family First Party, and the Australian Democrats, who contested the previous election and gained 24.9 percent, 9.6 percent, and 3.0 percent respectively, did not contest the by-election.

== Polling ==
One opinion poll was conducted and released by the in-house polling group at The Advertiser, Adelaide's main newspaper. On 30 January 2012, 410 voters were polled in the seat. After the Liberal Party declined to field a candidate, Labor's primary vote was at 51 percent (57.9 percent at the last election), with the LDP on 23 percent, Aldridge on 10 percent, the Greens on 9 percent (4.6 percent), with remaining candidates on about 7 percent collectively.

Labor was expected to easily retain the seat.

== Result ==
Ramsay state by-election, 11 February 2012
Party	Candidate	Votes	%	±%
Labor	Zoe Bettison	8,843	54.6	–3.3
Independent Voice of the Community	Mark Aldridge	2,614	16.1	+16.1
Liberal Democrats	Christopher Steele	2,157	13.3	+13.3
Greens	Ruth Beach	1,072	6.6	+2.0
One Nation	Chris Walsh	563	3.5	+3.5
Independent Trevor Grace Save the Unborn	Trevor Grace	510	3.2	+3.2
FREE Australia	Mark Lena	430	2.7	+2.7
Total formal votes		16,189	90.4	–5.3
Informal votes		1,726	9.6	+5.3
Turnout		17,915	80.2	–11.9
Two-candidate-preferred result
Labor	Zoe Bettison	10,795	66.7	–1.3
Independent Voice of the Community	Mark Aldridge	5,394	33.3	+33.3
Labor hold				

Labor retained the seat on a 66.7 percent two-candidate preferred vote against Aldridge, with a majority in all nine polling places – Ramsay remained the safest Labor seat in the parliament. Postal votes were included on 13 February, absentee and pre-poll votes were included on 14 February. Preference distributions occurred on 18 February. Results are final.

== See also ==
- List of South Australian House of Assembly by-elections
