= 2010 South Australian state election =

- 20 March 2010

All 47 seats in the South Australian House of Assembly 24 seats were needed for a majority 11 (of the 22) seats in the South Australian Legislative Council
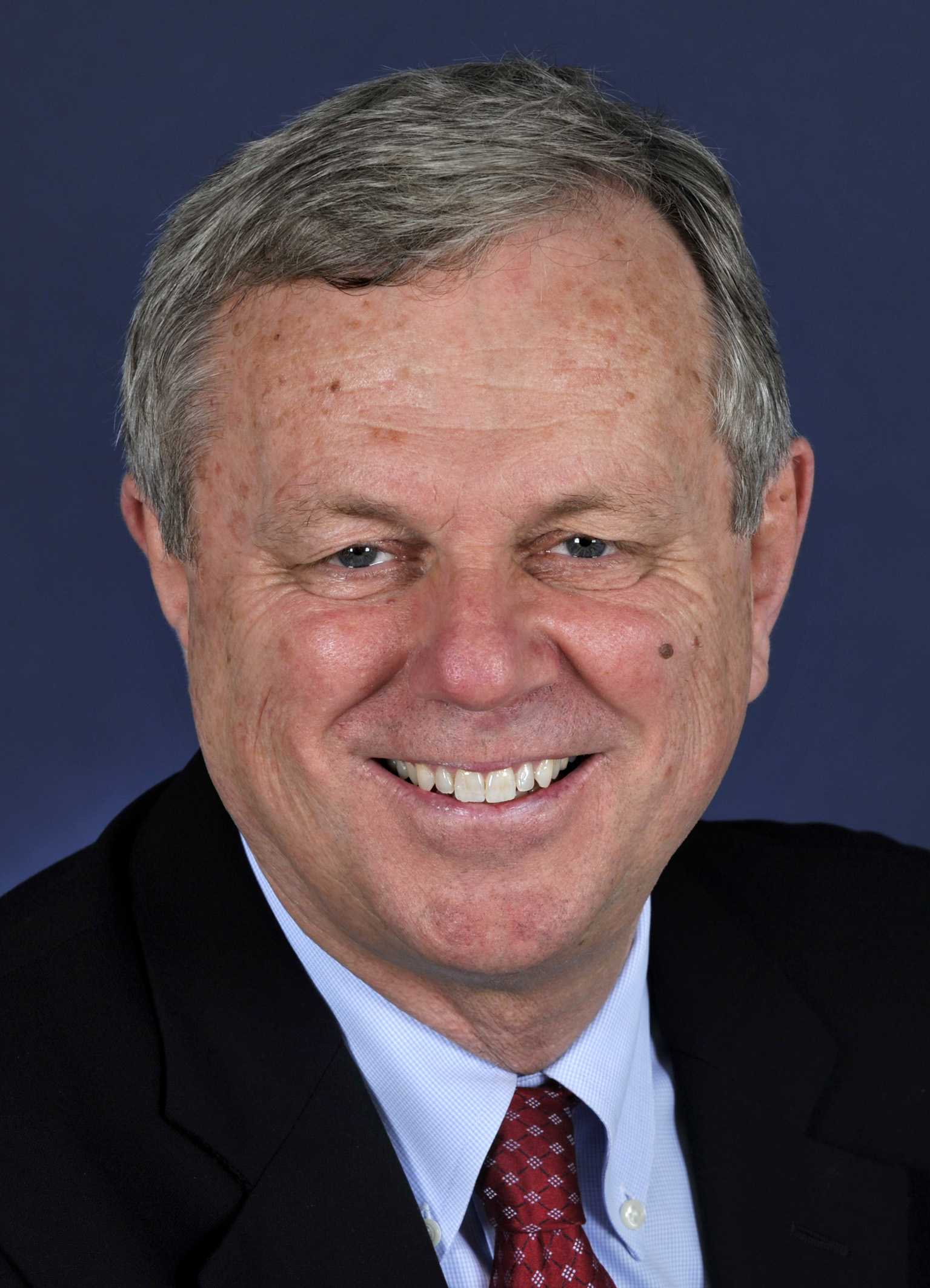

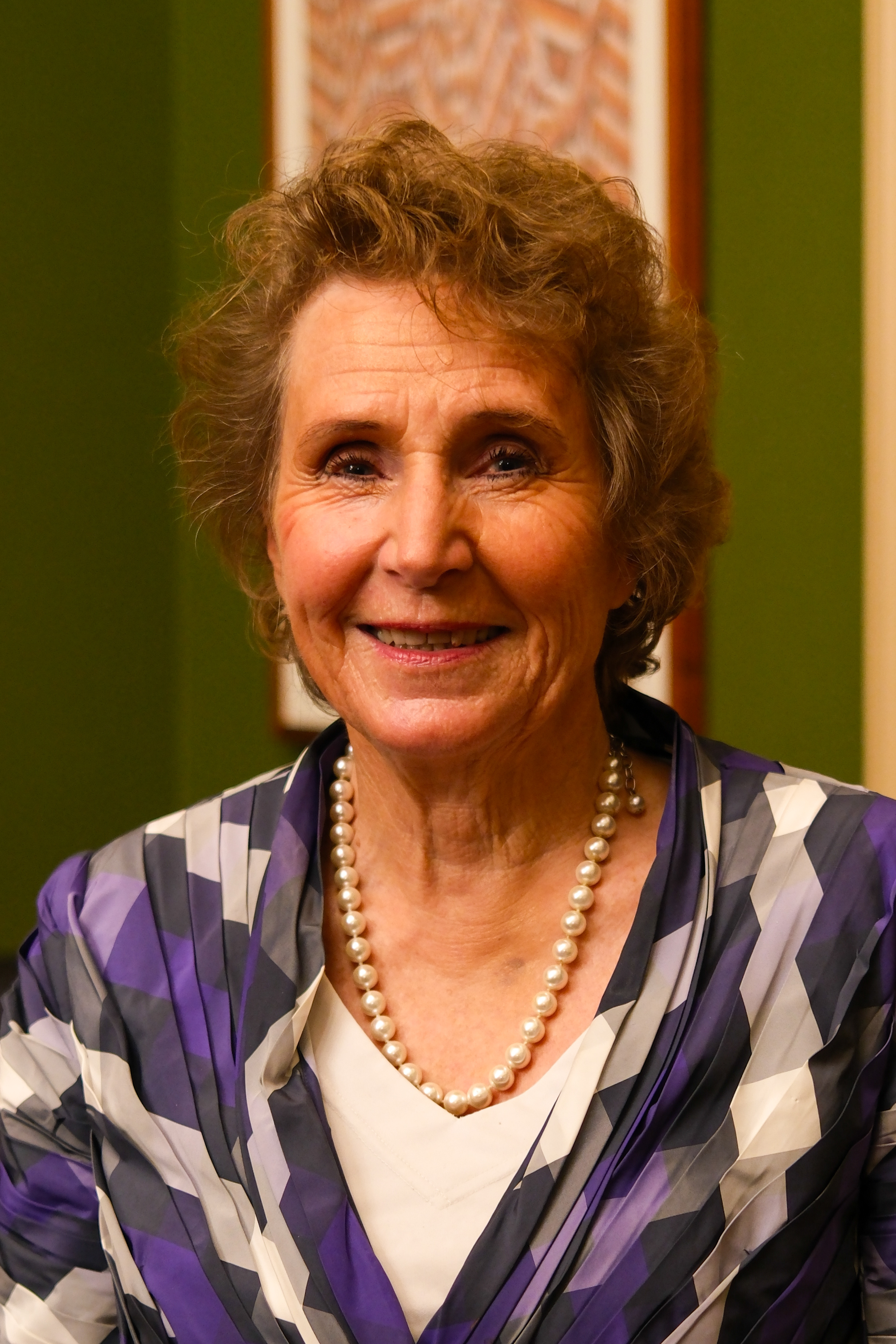

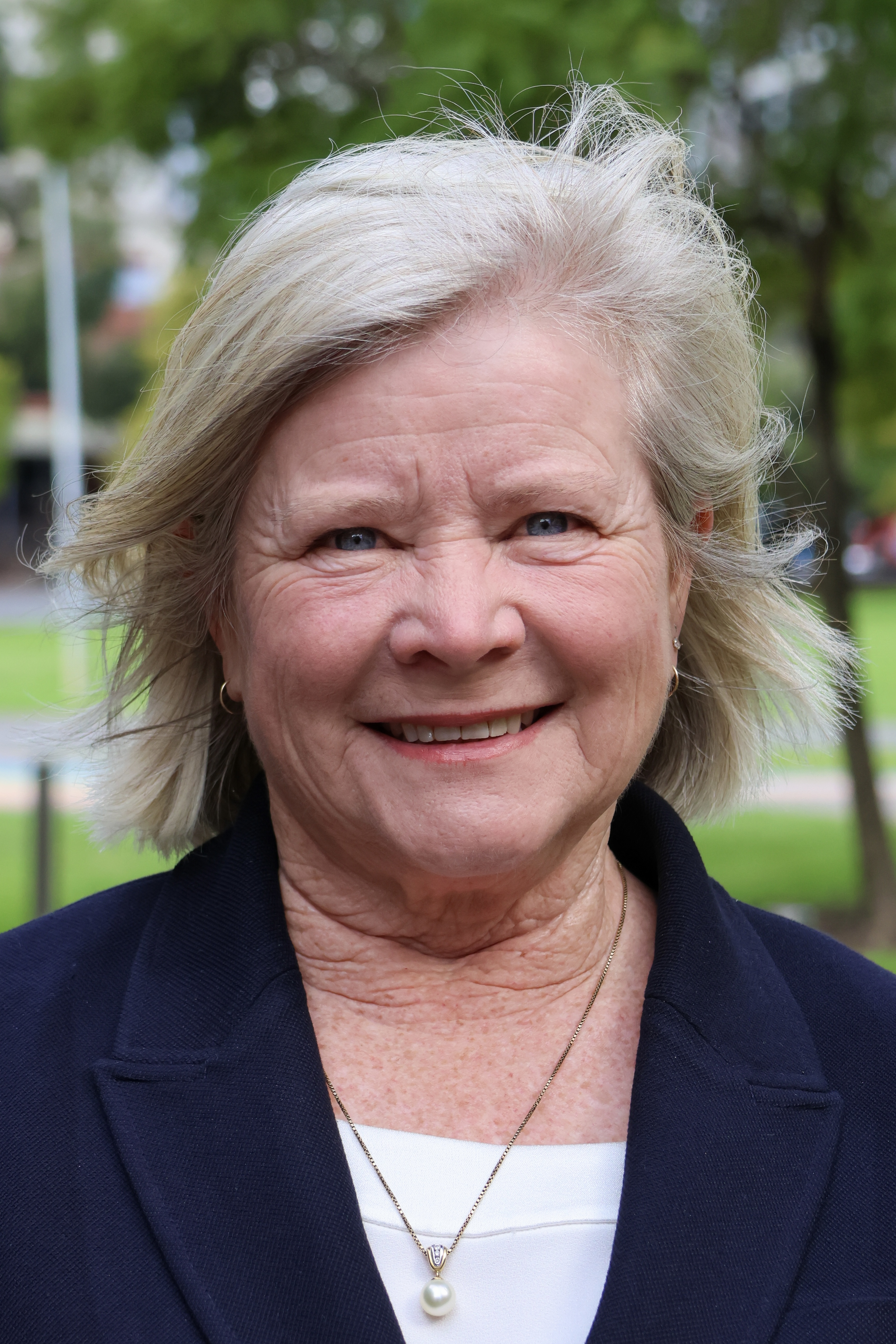
	First party	Second party	Third party
Leader	Mike Rann	Isobel Redmond	Karlene Maywald
Party	Labor	Liberal	National
Leader since	5 November 1994	8 July 2009	11 October 1997
Leader's seat	Ramsay	Heysen	Chaffey (lost seat)
Last election	28 seats	15 seats	1 seat
Seats won	26 seats	18 seats	0
Seat change	▼2	▲3	▼1
Primary vote	367,480	408,482	10,279
Percentage	37.47%	41.65%	1.05%
Swing	▼7.75	▲7.68	▼1.04
TPP	48.4%	51.6%
TPP swing	▼8.39	▲8.39
- Winning margin by electorate.
Premier before election
Mike Rann
Labor
Elected Premier
Mike Rann
Labor

The 2010 South Australian state election elected members to the 52nd Parliament of South Australia on 20 March 2010. All seats in the House of Assembly or lower house, whose current members were elected at the 2006 election, and half the seats in the Legislative Council or upper house, last filled at the 2002 election, became vacant.

The incumbent centre-left Australian Labor Party government led by Premier Mike Rann was elected to a third four-year term over the opposition centre-right Liberal Party of Australia led by Leader of the Opposition Isobel Redmond. Labor's landslide 7.7 percent swing to a two-party-preferred vote of 56.8 percent at the 2006 election was reversed at this election with a swing of 8.4 percent, finishing with a two-party vote of 48.4 percent, however, Labor retained majority government with 26 of 47 seats, a net loss of two. Labor lost the inner metropolitan seats of Adelaide, Morialta and Norwood to the Liberals while Nationals SA member Karlene Maywald lost her rural seat of Chaffey to the Liberals. Independent Kris Hanna lost to the Labor candidate in Mitchell, independents Bob Such in Fisher and Geoff Brock in Frome retained their seats (the latter having won at the 2009 by-election), while independent candidate Don Pegler won Mount Gambier, replacing outgoing independent Rory McEwen. Jay Weatherill took over from Rann as Premier and Labor leader in October 2011.

In the upper house, both major parties won four seats each, with the last three to the SA Greens, Family First, and Dignity for Disability. The composition of the upper house therefore became eight Labor, seven Liberal, two Green, two Family First, two independent No Pokies, and one Dignity for Disability.

Like federal elections, South Australia has compulsory voting, uses full-preference instant-runoff voting in single member seats for the lower house and single transferable vote group voting tickets in the proportionally represented upper house. The election was conducted by the Electoral Commission of South Australia (ECSA), an independent body answerable to Parliament.

== Results ==
=== House of Assembly ===
Party	Votes	%	+/–	Seats	+/–
Liberal	408,482	41.84	▲7.87	18	▲3
Labor	367,480	37.64	▼7.58	26	▼2
Greens	79,535	8.15	▲1.66	0	0
Family First Party	53,769	5.51	▼0.37	0	0
Independents	46,108	4.72	▲2.19	3	0
National	10,279	1.05	▼1.04	0	▼1
Democrats	3,682	0.38	▼2.51	0	0
Gamers 4 Croydon	1,962	0.20	New	0	New
Fair Land Tax - Tax Party	1,819	0.19	New	0	New
FREE Australia Party	1,497	0.15	New	0	New
Dignity for Disability	1,348	0.14	▼0.24	0	0
Democratic Labour Party	326	0.03	▲0.03	0	0
Total	976,287	100.00	–	47	–
Valid votes	976,287	96.66			
Invalid/blank votes	33,762	3.34	▼0.26		
Total votes	1,010,049	100.00	–		
Registered voters/turnout	1,093,316	92.38	▲0.07		
Two-party-preferred vote
Liberal	506,134	51.61	▲8.39		
Labor	474,535	48.39	▼8.39		
Total	980,669	100.00	–		

South Australian state election, 20 March 2010 House of Assembly << 2006–2014 >>
Enrolled voters	1,093,316				
Votes cast	1,014,431		Turnout	92.78	+0.47
Informal votes	33,762		Informal	3.33	–0.27
Summary of votes by party
Party	Primary votes	%	Swing	Seats	Change
Liberal	408,482	41.65	▲+7.68	18	+ 3
Labor	367,480	37.47	▼–7.75	26	– 2
Greens	79,535	8.11	▲+1.62	0	0
Family First	52,769	5.38	▼–0.50	0	0
National	10,279	1.05	▼–1.04	0	– 1
Democrats	3,682	0.38	▼–2.52	0	0
Independent	46,108	4.70	▲+2.73	3	0
Other	12,334	1.26	*	0	0
Total	980,669			47	
Two-party-preferred
Labor	474,535	48.39	▼–8.39		
Liberal	506,134	51.61	▲+8.39		

Popular vote
Liberal	41.65%
Labor	37.47%
Greens	8.11%
Family First	5.38%
Independents	4.70%
National	1.05%
Others	1.63%

Two-party-preferred vote
Liberal	51.61%
Labor	48.39%

Seats
Labor	55.32%
Liberal	38.30%
Independents	6.38%

Independents: Bob Such, Geoff Brock, Don Pegler

=== Seats changing hands ===
Seat	Pre-2010			Swing	Post-2010		
Seat	Party	Member	Margin	Swing	Margin	Member	Party
Adelaide	Labor	Jane Lomax-Smith	10.2	14.5	4.2	Rachel Sanderson	Liberal
Chaffey	Nationals SA	Karlene Maywald	17.2	20.0	3.8	Tim Whetstone	Liberal
Mitchell	Independent	Kris Hanna	0.6	N/A	2.1*	Alan Sibbons	Labor
Morialta	Labor	Lindsay Simmons	7.9	11.1	4.1	John Gardner	Liberal
Mount Gambier	Independent	Rory McEwen	6.2*	N/A	0.4*	Don Pegler	Independent
Norwood	Labor	Vini Ciccarello	4.2	8.8	4.9	Steven Marshall	Liberal

- *Figure is versus the Liberal Party. In the electoral district of Mount Gambier, the incumbent independent Rory McEwen did not re-contest his seat, and was expected to revert to the Liberal Party. However, another independent, Don Pegler, won the seat.
- In the electoral district of Frome, incumbent independent Geoff Brock retained his seat won at the 2009 Frome by-election, held at the 2006 election by former leader of the Liberal Party and former Premier, Rob Kerin.

=== Pendulum ===
The following Mackerras pendulum works by lining up all of the seats according to the percentage point margin post-election on a two-candidate-preferred basis. "Safe" seats require a swing of over 10 per cent to change, "fairly safe" seats require a swing of between 6 and 10 per cent, while "marginal" seats require a swing of less than 6 per cent.

Labor seats (26)
Marginal
Bright	Chloë Fox	ALP	0.4%
Mitchell	Alan Sibbons	ALP	2.1%
Newland	Tom Kenyon	ALP	2.2%
Hartley	Grace Portolesi	ALP	2.3%
Florey	Frances Bedford	ALP	3.6%
Elder	Pat Conlon	ALP	3.6%
Colton	Paul Caica	ALP	4.0%
Mawson	Leon Bignell	ALP	4.4%
Wright	Jennifer Rankine	ALP	4.6%
Ashford	Steph Key	ALP	4.8%
Light	Tony Piccolo	ALP	5.3%
Fairly safe
Little Para	Lee Odenwalder	ALP	6.7%
West Torrens	Tom Koutsantonis	ALP	6.7%
Lee	Michael Wright	ALP	7.1%
Torrens	Robyn Geraghty	ALP	7.7%
Kaurna	John Hill	ALP	8.6%
Safe
Reynell	Gay Thompson	ALP	10.4%
Enfield	John Rau	ALP	10.5%
Taylor	Leesa Vlahos	ALP	11.1%
Giles	Lyn Breuer	ALP	11.9%
Port Adelaide	Kevin Foley	ALP	12.8%
Croydon	Michael Atkinson	ALP	14.1%
Napier	Michael O'Brien	ALP	15.8%
Cheltenham	Jay Weatherill	ALP	16.1%
Playford	Jack Snelling	ALP	16.2%
Ramsay	Mike Rann	ALP	18.0%

Liberal seats (18)
Marginal
Chaffey	Tim Whetstone	LIB	3.8% v NAT
Morialta	John Gardner	LIB	4.1%
Adelaide	Rachel Sanderson	LIB	4.2%
Norwood	Steven Marshall	LIB	4.9%
Fairly safe
Stuart	Dan van Holst Pellekaan	LIB	7.6%
Safe
Morphett	Duncan McFetridge	LIB	11.1%
Finniss	Michael Pengilly	LIB	11.2%
Davenport	Iain Evans	LIB	11.8%
Unley	David Pisoni	LIB	12.2%
Waite	Martin Hamilton-Smith	LIB	12.9%
Kavel	Mark Goldsworthy	LIB	15.8%
Heysen	Isobel Redmond	LIB	16.5%
Schubert	Ivan Venning	LIB	17.8%
Goyder	Steven Griffiths	LIB	18.3%
Hammond	Adrian Pederick	LIB	19.0%
MacKillop	Mitch Williams	LIB	20.1% v IND
Bragg	Vickie Chapman	LIB	21.1%
Flinders	Peter Treloar	LIB	26.2%
Independent seats (3)
Mt Gambier	Don Pegler	IND	0.4% v LIB
Frome	Geoff Brock	IND	7.5% v LIB
Fisher	Bob Such	IND	16.6% v LIB

=== Legislative Council ===
South Australian state election, 20 March 2010 Legislative Council << 2006–2014 >>
Enrolled voters	1,093,316				
Votes cast	1,015,386		Turnout	92.9	–0.2
Informal votes	58,714		Informal	5.8	+0.6
Summary of votes by party
Party	Primary votes	%	Swing	Seats won	Seats held
Liberal	376,786	39.4	▲+13.4	4	7
Labor	356,626	37.3	▲+0.7	4	8
Greens	63,358	6.6	▲+2.3	1	2
Family First	42,187	4.4	▼–0.6	1	2
Dignity for Disability	11,271	1.2	▲+0.6	1	1
Save the RAH	9,241	1.0	New	0	0
Democrats	8,258	0.9	▼–0.9	0	0
Gamers 4 Croydon	7,994	0.8	New	0	0
Democratic Labour	7,923	0.8	New	0	0
Shooters	7,699	0.8	▲+0.2	0	0
Fair Land Tax	5,960	0.6	New	0	0
One Nation	4,972	0.5	▼–0.3	0	0
FREE Australia	3,766	0.4	New	0	0
National	3,489	0.4	▼–0.3	0	0
United Party	1,691	0.2	New	0	0
Independent	45,451	4.8	▲+1.6	0	0
Total	956,672			11	22

Prior to the election, of 22 seats, Labor and the Liberals held eight seats each, Family First and No Pokies held two seats each, and the Greens and Democrat-turned-independent David Winderlich held one seat each. Up for election were five Liberal, four Labor, one Family First, and Winderlich. Labor and the Liberals won four seats each, with one each to Family First and the Greens, with the last spot to Dignity for Disability candidate Kelly Vincent. This gives an upper house composition of eight Labor, seven Liberal, two Greens, two Family First, two independent No Pokies, and one Dignity for Disability.

== Campaign ==
Rann Labor opened the campaign by announcing the duplication (one-way to two-way) of the Southern Expressway, due to be completed by 2014. Additional specialist maths and science teachers for South Australian high schools were announced. Tens of thousands of extra training places and apprenticeships as part of a pledge to create 100,000 extra jobs during the next six years, despite a healthy economy, assisted by mining and defence industries, and the lowest state unemployment figures in the country.

Under Labor, the Royal Adelaide Hospital would be abandoned and a new hospital built on the site of the old rail yards, moving Adelaide's main hospital from the eastern end to the western end of North Terrace in the Central Business District, within the electoral district of Adelaide. The Liberals and minor party Save the RAH were campaigning against this, with the Liberals proposing renovations on the current site.

Australian Football League (AFL) games and other sporting events are expected to be moved away from AAMI Stadium to new grounds. The Liberals proposed a new sports stadium on the old rail yards, while Labor proposed a major overhaul of Adelaide Oval, also in the electoral district of Adelaide.

A large unfunded liability within the workers compensation scheme known as WorkCover had built up under both Labor and Liberal governments, which sparked sweeping payout reductions under the last term of the Rann government, with the legislation passed in Parliament by both major parties, but came under sustained criticism from both the left and the right. The left were critical of monetary cuts to injured or otherwise incapable workers (see 2008 Parnell–Bressington filibuster), while the Liberals attacked WorkCover's operations, claiming there was wasteful duplication and a decrease in accountability, argued that this contributed to its budget problems, and that under a Liberal government WorkCover's insurance and regulatory arms would be split.

Attorney-General Michael Atkinson had been the subject of sustained criticism by the internet generation demographic for refusing to allow classification of and therefore legally allow certain types of explicit media (see Michael Atkinson#Media classification and censorship). Gamers 4 Croydon was created and contested Atkinson's seat of Croydon, as well as Adelaide, Norwood, Light, Mawson, and the upper house. Though the Liberals had not pledged a different stance on the issue, Atkinson suffered a larger than average primary swing of 16 points and two-party-preferred swing of 12 points in his seat. Following the election, Atkinson announced his immediate resignation from the Rann ministry, and that he would not recontest his seat at the next election. It was announced that the new Rann Labor Attorney General would be John Rau, who expressed that he held a different view to his predecessor, and would be talking with his interstate counterparts at the next meeting of Attorneys General.

The election campaign was overshadowed by affair allegations against Rann.

Although it was apparent only a few hours after the polls closed that Rann Labor had retained majority government, it was four days after the election that Rann officially claimed victory, after Redmond eventually conceded that the Liberals had not won enough seats to be capable of forming a government. The Governor of South Australia subsequently re-appointed Mike Rann as Premier of South Australia.

Labor retained government despite the Liberals winning a bare majority of the statewide two-party vote. The "fairness clause" in the state constitution was intended to ensure that the party winning the statewide two-party vote would win a majority of seats. On the boundaries drawn after the 2006 election, which were based on over a quarter-century of voting patterns, a uniform swing of 6.9 percent would have seen the Liberals take seven seats off Labor—on paper, enough to make Redmond South Australia's first female premier. However, despite suffering a swing of 8.4 percent, Labor only lost three seats, and only two of them—Morialta and Adelaide—saw swings of 6.9 percent or more. While 22 seats saw double-digit swings, Labor sat on insurmountably safe margins in 16 of them. Labor actually picked up swings in their favour in their two most marginal seats, Light and Mawson. The ABC's Antony Green observed that Labor lost votes in seats that would have stayed in Labor hands in any event, while holding onto its support in seats the Liberals needed to win government.

Additionally, the Liberals only won nine of the 34 metropolitan seats, though all three seats they took off Labor were in Adelaide. For most of the four decades since the end of the Playmander, South Australian politics have been characterised by an extreme urban-rural split. Under normal conditions, Labor wins the most seats in the capital, while most of the Liberal vote is packed into ultra-safe rural seats. The 2010 election was no different. While six of the Liberals' 13 safe seats were urban, all but one of their four marginal seats were urban. As was the case at the 1989 election, much of the Liberal majority was wasted on landslides in their rural heartland.

== Candidates ==
See Candidates of the South Australian state election, 2010

=== Retiring ===
==== Liberal ====
- Graham Gunn MHA (Stuart)
- Liz Penfold MHA (Flinders)
- Robert Lawson MLC
- Caroline Schaefer MLC

==== Labor ====
- Lea Stevens MHA (Little Para)
- Trish White MHA (Taylor)

==== Other ====
- Rory McEwen MHA (Mount Gambier, Independent)

== Polling ==
Newspoll polling is conducted via random telephone number selection in city and country areas. Sampling sizes consist of just under 900 electors, with the 14–18 March 2010 poll consisting of just under 1600 electors. The declared margin of errors are ± 3.5 percent and ± 2.5 percent respectively.

Better Premier polling^
	Labor Rann	Liberal Redmond
14–18 Mar 2010	43%	45%
Jan–Mar 2010	44%	41%
Oct–Dec 2009	48%	31%
Jul–Aug 2009	46%	27%
Jan–Mar 2009	53%	24%^{3}
Oct–Dec 2008	50%	26%^{3}
Jul–Sep 2008	48%	30%^{3}
Apr–Jun 2008	54%	27%^{3}
Jan–Mar 2008	54%	24%^{3}
Oct–Dec 2007	50%	25%^{3}
Jul–Sep 2007	52%	26%^{3}
Apr–Jun 2007	52%	21%^{3}
Jan–Mar 2007	64%	14%^{2}
Oct–Dec 2006	61%	14%^{2}
Pre 2006 election	63%	21%^{1}
Pre 2002 election	30%	50%^{1}
Polling conducted by Newspoll and published in The Australian.^ Remainder were "uncommitted" to either leader.^{1} Rob Kerin, ^{2} Iain Evans, ^{3} Martin Hamilton-Smith

House of Assembly (lower house) polling
	Primary vote							TPP vote
	ALP	Lib	Nat	Grn	FFP	Dem	Oth	ALP	Lib
2010 election	37.5%	41.7%	1.0%	8.1%	5.4%	0.4%	5.9%	48.4%	51.6%
14–18 Mar 2010	35.3%	42.5%	< .5%	9.3%	3.2%	< .5%	9.1%	48%	52%
Jan–Mar 2010	36%	39%	1%	10%	1%	1%	12%	50%	50%
Oct–Dec 2009	37%	35%	1%	12%	1%	1%	13%	53%	47%
Jul–Aug 2009	41%	33%	1%	11%	1%	1%	12%	56%	44%
Jan–Mar 2009	42%	34%	1%	10%	1%	1%	11%	56%	44%
Oct–Dec 2008	39%	35%	1%	13%	1%	< .5%	11%	54%	46%
Jul–Sep 2008	38%	40%	1%	8%	1%	1%	11%	50%	50%
Apr–Jun 2008	41%	35%	1%	12%	2%	< .5%	9%	54%	46%
Jan–Mar 2008	41%	37%	< .5%	8%	1%	1%	10%	53%	47%
Oct–Dec 2007	42%	36%	1%	7%	3%	2%	9%	54%	46%
Jul–Sep 2007	48%	33%	1%	6%	2%	2%	8%	59%	41%
Apr–Jun 2007	47%	35%	1%	5%	2%	1%	9%	57%	43%
Jan–Mar 2007	48%	29%	1%	6%	2%	4%	10%	61%	39%
Oct–Dec 2006	47%	33%	1%	4%	3%	2%	10%	58%	42%
2006 election	45.2%	34%	2.1%	6.5%	5.9%	2.9%	3.4%	56.8%	43.2%
15–16 Mar 2006	46%	33%	1.5%	4%	3%	1.5%	11%	57%	43%
Jan–Feb 2006	44%	37%	2%	3%	2%	2%	10%	54%	46%
Oct–Dec 2005	46%	35%	2%	4%	2%	1%	10%	56%	43%
Jul–Sep 2005	45%	38%	2%	4%	1%	1%	9%	54%	46%
Apr–Jun 2005	46%	37%	2%	4%	2%	1%	8%	55%	45%
Jan–Mar 2005	45%	40%	1%	5%	1%	1%	7%	53%	47%
Oct–Dec 2004	42%	42%	2%	4%	2%	1%	7%	49%	51%
2002 election	36.3%	40%	1.5%	2.4%	2.6%	7.5%	9.7%	49.1%	50.9%
Polling conducted by Newspoll and published in The Australian.

== Date ==
The last state election was held on 18 March 2006 to elect members for the House of Assembly and half of the members in the Legislative Council. In South Australia, section 28 of the Constitution Act 1934, as amended in 2001, directs that parliaments have fixed four-year terms, and elections must be held on the third Saturday in March every four years unless this date falls the day after Good Friday or occurs within the same month as a Commonwealth election, or the conduct of the election could be adversely affected by a state disaster. Section 28 also states that the Governor may also dissolve the Assembly and call an election for an earlier date if the Government has lost the confidence of the Assembly or a bill of special importance has been rejected by the Legislative Council. Section 41 states that both the Council and the Assembly may also be dissolved simultaneously if a deadlock occurs between them.

The election campaign must run for a minimum of 25 days or a maximum of 55 days, therefore the Governor would need to have issued writs for the election by 23 February 2010 at the latest. Between 7 and 10 days after that date, the electoral roll is closed, which gives voters a final opportunity to enrol or to notify the State Electoral Office of any changes in their place of residence. Candidates wishing to stand for election can nominate between the issue of the writs and no more than 14 days after the close of rolls for a deposit of $450.

The writs were issued 20 February, the electoral roll closed 2 March, and candidate nominations closed 5 March.

== Previous Parliament ==
The centre-left Australian Labor Party, led by Premier Mike Rann, and the centre-right Liberal Party of Australia, led by Leader of the Opposition Isobel Redmond, are the two main parties in South Australia. In the 2006 state election, of 47 seats total, Labor won 28 seats, the Liberals won 15 seats and the Nationals, who are not in coalition with the Liberals in South Australia, retained their seat through minister Karlene Maywald (Chaffey). Three seats were retained by independents, minister Rory McEwen (Mount Gambier), Bob Such (Fisher) and Kris Hanna (Mitchell). Smaller parties which held no seats in the lower House but achieved significant votes in 2006 included the SA Greens and the Family First Party.

In the South Australian Legislative Council, the Labor Party and the Liberal Party held eight seats each, whilst No Pokies and Family First held two seats each. The SA Greens and an ex-Democrat independent held one seat each. Half of the upper house was up for election in 2010, four Labor and five Liberal, one Family First and one ex-Democrat independent.

No Pokies MP Nick Xenophon, re-elected in 2006 until 2014, was replaced by former No Pokies candidate John Darley after Xenophon's resignation to run for the Australian Senate at the 2007 federal election in which he was successful. Former Liberal MP Robert Brokenshire replaced Family First MP Andrew Evans as an MLC in 2008. The last remaining Democrats MP anywhere in Australia, Sandra Kanck, chose to resign before the end of her term, which prompted a party membership ballot to choose a replacement in early 2009. David Winderlich was selected. He resigned from the party in late 2009 to sit in parliament as an independent.

Former Liberal Premier Rob Kerin resigned in November 2008, which triggered a 2009 Frome by-election. Independent Geoff Brock won the seat, reducing the Liberals to 14 of 47 seats. A 2012 Ramsay by-election and a 2012 Port Adelaide by-election saw Labor retain both seats.

== See also ==
- Rann government
- Candidates of the South Australian state election, 2010
- Members of the South Australian House of Assembly, 2010–2014
- Members of the South Australian Legislative Council, 2010–2014
- Previous election: 2006 South Australian state election
- Next election: 2014 South Australian state election
