= Paul Collier (physicist) =

British physicist

- Education: Sheffield Hallam University
- Scientific career
- Fields: Applied physics Electrical engineering
- Workplaces: CERN; Sheffield Hallam University

Paul Collier is a British physicist who is the Head of Beams Department (BE) at CERN. He has worked on the Large Electron-Positron Collider (LEP), the Super Proton Synchrotron (SPS) and the Large Hadron Collider (LHC), either through engineering contributions or leadership over 25 years.

== Biography and career ==
In 1982, Collier went to Sheffield Hallam University to study for a PhD in applied physics. He later became a lecturer in applied physics and electrical engineering at the same university.

Collier now works at The European Organization for Nuclear Research better known as CERN. He started at CERN in January 1987, as part of a 3-year fellows training program for young scientist and engineers. During his program, he worked on the construction and installation of the radio frequency accelerating system for the accelerator LEP. At the end of the 3-year program, he was recruited as an engineer and sent to work in the operations group.

Collier is the head of Beams Department at CERN. He has been in that role since 2009. The Beams department's task is to operate the accelerators at CERN. The department has around 600 people, approximately 400 are staff members and the rest are students, fellows and industrial support staff.

=== Memberships and honors ===
- Fellow of the Royal Academy of Engineering (FREng), 2015
- Order of the British Empire (OBE) Queen's Birthday Honours Overseas list, June 2019
