= Mark Aldridge =

Australian perennial candidate

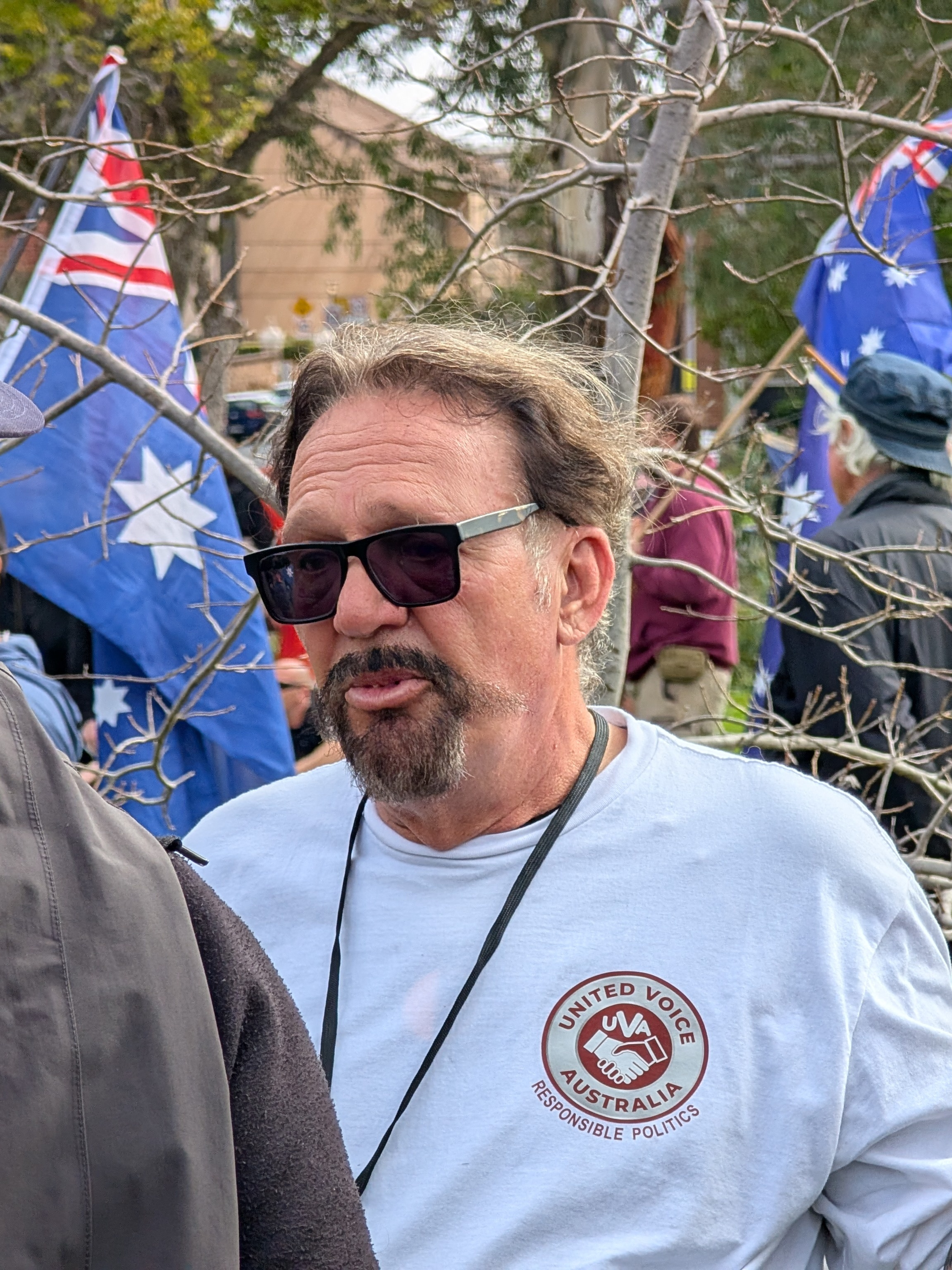
Aldridge at March for Australia rally in August 2025

Mark Aldridge is an Australian perennial candidate, political activist, car yard operator and animal welfare advocate. Aldridge has run unsuccessfully in 13 local, state and federal elections, including for One Nation, The Great Australian Party, Trumpet of Patriots and as an independent candidate eight times. He has been the National Director of Australian Federation Party and the leader of United Voice Australia Party.

== Political activities ==
Mark Aldridge ran in the 2001 Australian federal election as a senate candidate on a group ticket with Helen Aldridge. He received 0.02% of the vote. Aldridge ran in the 2002 South Australian state election as a candidate for the legislative council on a group ticket with KW Fishlock. Aldridge received 0.3% of the vote. Aldridge ran as a One Nation candidate in South Australia for the Senate at the 2007 federal election. He received 0.06% of the first preference vote.

Aldridge ran as an independent for the Legislative Council in the 2010 South Australian state election on a 'Change is Necessary' ticket with Helen Aldridge. He received 0.1% of the vote. According to Crikey, in the lead up to the election he had registered a website with the URL "www.howtovoteinsa.net" and was receiving a large volume of calls from voters who were confused about the electoral process. He stated that after the election he received even more calls from people who were dissatisfied with the democratic process, and then collected thousands of statements and dispositions from disgruntled voters. He presented a petition to the Supreme Court of South Australia to overturn the election. Chief Justice John Doyle was critical of Aldridge, who was self representing, for providing the court with a "mass of material, much of it completely irrelevant". After three directions hearings, Justice Doyle struck out the case, stating "something as important as an election result cannot be challenged by a petition that fails to identify adequately and with reasonable particulars what the allegations are, and what are the facts relied upon."

Aldridge ran as an independent in the 2012 Ramsay by-election following the resignation of former premier Mike Rann. He received 16.1% of the first preference vote (33.3% of the Two-party-preferred vote), coming second to Zoe Bettison who received 54.6% of the primary vote (66.7% of the two-party-preferred vote). Aldridge ran as an independent for the seat of Wakefield in the 2013 Federal Election. He received 4.1% of the first preference vote. Aldridge was arrested during the campaign, but stated "I'm not really sure what this is about". Aldridge was later charged with firearms offences. He stated that he planned to sue the state government for $100,000 for false arrest. He documented the arrest using a camera hidden in his watch, and claimed to have been "bruised and battered".

Aldridge ran as an independent Legislative Council candidate for the 2014 South Australian Election. He stated on his blog:

This is to be my last campaign, if I remain un-elected, I will take that as a resounding, we dont want you as a representative, I sincerely hope who ever comes next, takes a strong interest in democratic reform, because I strongly believe until we embrace honest democracy, we will continue to remain a divided nation on the wrong path.

He received 0.3% of the first preference vote. In the 2016 Australian Federal Election, Aldridge ran as an independent in the South Australian seat of Makin. He suggested that the Nick Xenophon Team candidate may not be a real candidate because he was not present on the campaign trail, before it was revealed that the candidate had been diagnosed with bowel cancer and was forced to have a major operation, chemotherapy and radiotherapy. He received 2.26% of the vote. He also received a dishonourable mention in The Advertiser's 2016 'Off the Record's Awards' for "turning a blind eye to his few supporters' misogynist remarks about female journalists".

In 2018, Aldridge ran for Mayor of the City of Playford, neighbouring the City of Salisbury where his mother, Gillian Aldridge has been the Mayor since 2008. He received 12.3% of the first preference vote. Aldridge ran again for the seat of Ramsay in the 2018 South Australian election and received 6.9% of the first preference vote. Nick Xenophon's SA-Best Party lodged a complaint to the Electoral Commissioner of South Australia for Aldridge's use of the slogan "SA's best candidate", accusing him of misleading voters.

In the 2019 Australian federal election, Aldridge ran as the top South Australian senate candidate for The Great Australian Party, newly established by former One Nation Senator Rod Culleton, receiving 1.16% of the primary vote. Although he did not run at the 2022 Australian federal election, Aldridge was the national director of the Australian Federation Party, which later changed its name to Trumpet of Patriots as part of a merger. One of the Australian Federation Party candidates, Malcolm Heffernan, was referred to the Australian Federal Police after it was revealed he was simultaneously running as a candidate for One Nation. Aldridge described the situation as a "mixup", stating "we had his WA seat [Brand] available, I did a bit of research from him [Heffernan], found him to be half reasonable and so we endorsed him and filed the paperwork correctly".

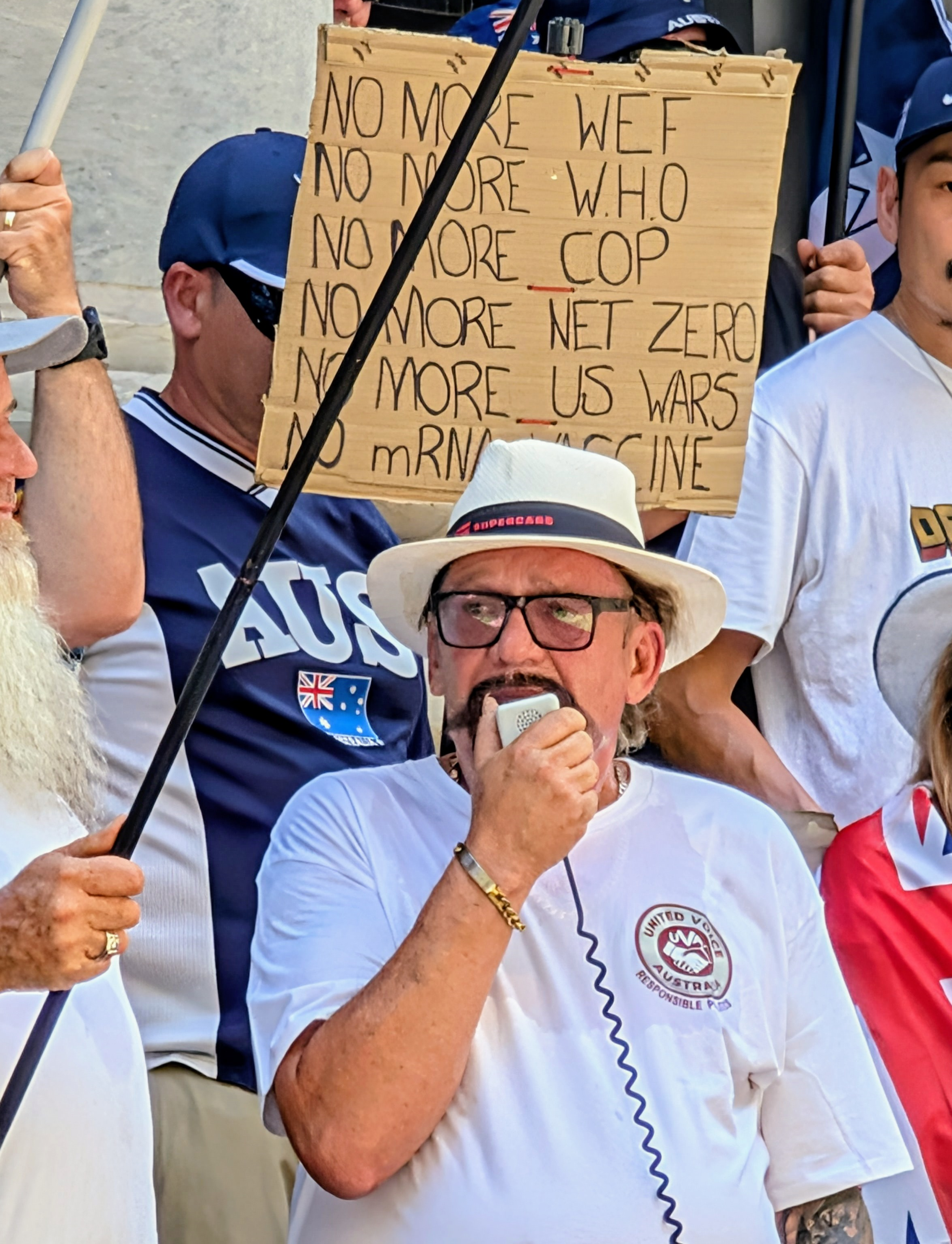
Aldridge speaking at 2026 Australia Day rally, Adelaide.

Aldridge was singled out by online verification service RMIT CrossCheck for spreading misinformation about the 2023 Voice Referendum when he stated that the voice could be expanded to have veto powers as a "black parliament". At the 2025 Australian federal election, Aldridge was endorsed as a Trumpet of Patriots candidate for the South Australian seat of Makin. However, he resigned from the party several days before the election, in part due to the party's mass SMS marketing campaign, which he considered a breach of privacy. He stated that if he was elected, the "honourable thing" would be to re-join the party. He received 4.02% of the vote.

Aldridge was one of the organisers of the August 2025 March For Australia rally in Adelaide, where the microphone was given to a Neo-Nazi, leading to Aldridge cutting power to the microphone. He stated that the event was about "mass immigration at a time when Aussies are struggling" and that "neo-Nazis had infiltrated at the very beginning of the protest". At a subsequent March of Australia rally in October, Aldridge attended as a counter protestor, telling the Australian Broadcasting Commission he disagreed with 'racist undertones' of the March For Australia rally.

Aldridge is the leader of the United Voice Australia Party, which was established in 2025. In the 2026 South Australian Election, United Voice Australia ran 15 lower house candidates, receiving a total of 0.2% of the vote, and two upper house candidates - including Aldridge - receiving 0.2% of the vote. Following the election, Aldridge stated that the party was facing financial difficulties due to an overspend on social media marketing and a requirement to repay advanced funding from the electoral commission for a candidate who had stepped down. He set up a fundraising campaign to stop the party from being closed.

== Defamation case ==
In the defamation case Johnston v Aldridge, the District Court of South Australia ordered Aldridge to pay $100,000 in damages, including aggravated damages, after finding him liable for defamatory posts by him and comments posted by others on his Facebook page.

Mark Aldridge was embroiled in a dispute with Benjamin Johnston, who was the owner of a fruit and vegetable shop, over the approval process of a fruit and vegetable market run by Aldridge in a nearby suburb. In a Facebook post in November 2015, Aldridge alleged that Johnston was "intent on closing farmers markets in Australia" and that "thousands of good hardworking Australians will lose, they will lose jobs, farms and businesses". In a separate post in February 2016, Aldridge stated that "[Johnson] is still trying as hard as he can to shut Farm Direct". Both posts attracted many further comments by followers of Aldridge, with similar sentiments to his original posts.

During the case, Aldridge pleaded that he bore no liability for the comments on his posts. The Court found that by publishing the posts, Aldridge had provided a forum for other users to add their comments, and that Aldridge had participated in the publication of the comments, similarly to a website forum host acting as a secondary publisher. The court found that while individual comments alone would be nothing more than "vulgar abuse", collectively, they served to emphasise the defamatory imputations of the original posts.

The case established liability for secondary publication of comments, regardless of if the original poster has control over the authors of the comments. It suggests that the original poster is still responsible for monitoring and removing inappropriate comments.

== Firearms licence cancellation ==
In 2013, South Australian Police searched Aldridge's property to check if his firearms were stored correctly, and removed five firearms including a rifle and a pistol. He was later arrested and charged under Section 21 of the Firearms Act, with the charges later dropped. Aldridge made a complaint to the Police Ombusdsman, who found that there was no reasonable prospect for the police to pursue the gun charges against him.

In 2017, Aldridge was charged with aggravated assault using an offensive weapon, aggravated threatening to cause harm, discharging a firearm to injure, annoy or frighten, and two counts of breach of bail. He was accused of shooting at a group of young people who had been doing burnouts and lighting fireworks near his house.

The Registrar of Firearms cancelled Aldridge's firearms licence in 2020, after he made repeated indirect threats to use his firearms to harm others. The Registrar stated that he was "not a fit and proper" person to hold one. Aldrige applied to SA Civil and Administrative Tribunal to have his firearms licence reinstated, but after a two-day hearing the tribunal denied his application, stating "there is a risk that the applicant may cause harm to another by the threatened use of a firearm."

== Animal welfare advocacy ==
=== Moorook Animal Shelter ===
In 2013 he was a spokesperson for the Moorook Animal Shelter. The Royal Society for the Prevention of Cruelty to Animals (RSPCA) conducted inspections and removed several animals from the shelter. Aldridge argued that the facility was unfairly targeted and that the RSPCA should do more to support the shelter's work. The owner was later charged with animal neglect.

=== Bushfire relief ===
After the 2015 Sampson Flat bushfires, Aldridge led a team of volunteers to provide support for victims and animals through his sanctuary Willow Wood Sanctuary. Channel Seven's Sunrise contacted Aldridge to undertake a live interview about his support. After Aldridge arranged volunteers and victims to be at his house from 5.30am for the special broadcast, nobody from Channel Seven arrived at Aldridge's property, leading to him criticizing the network, stating "In the world of mobile phones, they could have let us know last night, I will never watch that show ever again". In response, Sunrise provided its own clarification that they were expecting Aldridge to call them the day prior to confirm. Sunrise said that when he did not call, they made multiple attempts to contact him. They stated:

Producers again made contact with Mark early on Tuesday morning to check he had received the previous evening's messages. Mark replied that he had received the messages sent the previous evening, but had been unable to respond as he had returned to the fire zone. Sunrise producers have a text message from Mark confirming he had received the messages that Sunrise would not be attending the sanctuary.

A senior member of the Sunrise staff contacted Mark on Tuesday. Mark advised that he would amend his Facebook post to say that it had been a misunderstanding and that Sunrise was not at fault

=== South Australian Humane Animal Rescue Association ===
In 2025, Aldridge defended the South Australian Humane Animal Rescue Association (SAHARA), which was described by AdelaideNow as a "shelter from hell". When horses were seized and euthanized from a SAHARA property, Aldridge argued that funding losses and misinformation had undermined the shelter, while critics alleged neglect and poor animal welfare standards. Aldridge started a fundraising campaign to support the shelter, after it lost its charity status and its owners Shane Jones and Carole Morris were charged with 44 offences under the South Australian Animal Welfare Act. Aldridge argued that the seized animals were "perfectly healthy" and unlawfully taken. In 2025, 100 further animals were seized from the sanctuary by the RSPCA as part of an ongoing joint investigation with the Department of Environment and Water and Primary Industries. Aldridge claimed the animals seized were in "beautiful condition" and "only became afraid when the RSPCA arrived." He stated that when the RSPCA shot a steer, other cows witnessing it started to shed tears.

== Personal life ==
Mark Aldridge was raised in the northern suburbs where he has been a lifelong resident of Parafield Gardens.
