= Sandra Kanck =

Australian politician

The Honourable Sandra Kanck
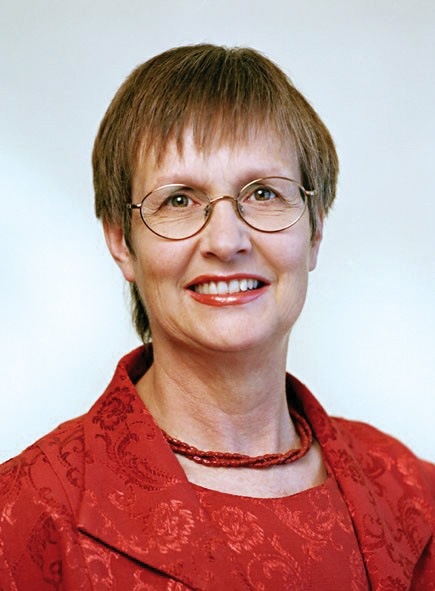

Member of the South Australian Legislative Council
- In office 11 December 1993 – 7 February 2009
- Preceded by: Mike Elliott
- Succeeded by: David Winderlich

Personal details
- Born: Sandra Myrtho Cederblad; 20 April 1950 (age 76) Broken Hill, New South Wales, Australia
- Party: Sustainable Australia Party (2009–present)
- Other political affiliations: Australian Democrats (until 2012)
- Education: Broken Hill High School
- Alma mater: Nepean College (DipEd)
- Profession: Teacher; politician

Sandra Myrtho Kanck (born 20 April 1950) is a South Australian politician. She was a member of the South Australian Legislative Council from 1993 to 2009, first elected for the Australian Democrats for an eight-year term at the 1993 election and was re-elected for the Democrats for another eight-year term at the 2002 election. Kanck announced her parliamentary resignation in November 2008, taking effect in January 2009. Democrats nominee David Winderlich filled the upper house casual vacancy in a joint sitting of the Parliament of South Australia in February 2009.

== Early life ==
Sandra Kanck (née Cederblad) was born in Broken Hill, New South Wales with six younger siblings and she credits the associated financial poverty and her Methodist Church upbringing to many of her views about inequality and injustice. She was a primary school teacher in NSW from 1978 to 1980, teaching at Gillieston and Weston Primary Schools in the Hunter Valley.

== Early politics ==
In 1971 she attended her first public meeting to express concern at nuclear weapons testing by the French at Muroroa Atoll. From this point onwards she became involved in the anti-nuclear and then peace and environment movements. From 1991 to 1992 she was employed by the Conservation Council of South Australia as Administrative Assistant and then Administrative Officer. Continuing her anti-nuclear activism, in 2009, she authored, on behalf of the Australian Democrats (SA Division Inc.) a substantial submission in response to the Draft Environmental Impact Statement on the proposed Olympic Dam mine expansion.

== Parliament ==
First elected at the 1993 election, Kanck's first speech in parliament was about the need for an environmentally sustainable level of population for Australia, and her first private member's bill was about the choosing and ongoing education of judges.

Kanck twice introduced a bill for a Midwives Act, and during the course of debate on the Nurses Act 1999 fought hard and successfully to retain a register of midwives separate from that of nurses. For her advocacy the SA Branch of the Australian College of Midwives chose her for their inaugural Midwifery Advocate of the Year Award in 1999.

On 14 March 2001 Kanck introduced her Dignity in Dying Bill 2001 to the South Australian Parliament. The bill was drafted in large part by the South Australian Voluntary Euthanasia Society (SAVES), of which she has since been awarded life membership. She introduced the bill twice, and on the second occasion it passed the second reading vote, but failed at the third reading. In August 2006, Kanck ignored government requests not to discuss suicide methods in a parliamentary speech on legalising voluntary euthanasia. Although suppressed from the parliament's internet record by a narrowly resolved Legislative Council vote, the speech was published elsewhere. She is the first parliamentarian in Australia to have been censored in this way.

In May 2006, she controversially advocated the therapeutic use of MDMA (identified in news media as "ecstasy" or "the base ingredient in ecstasy"). One of her final private members' bills in 2008 was a bill for the medical use of cannabis.

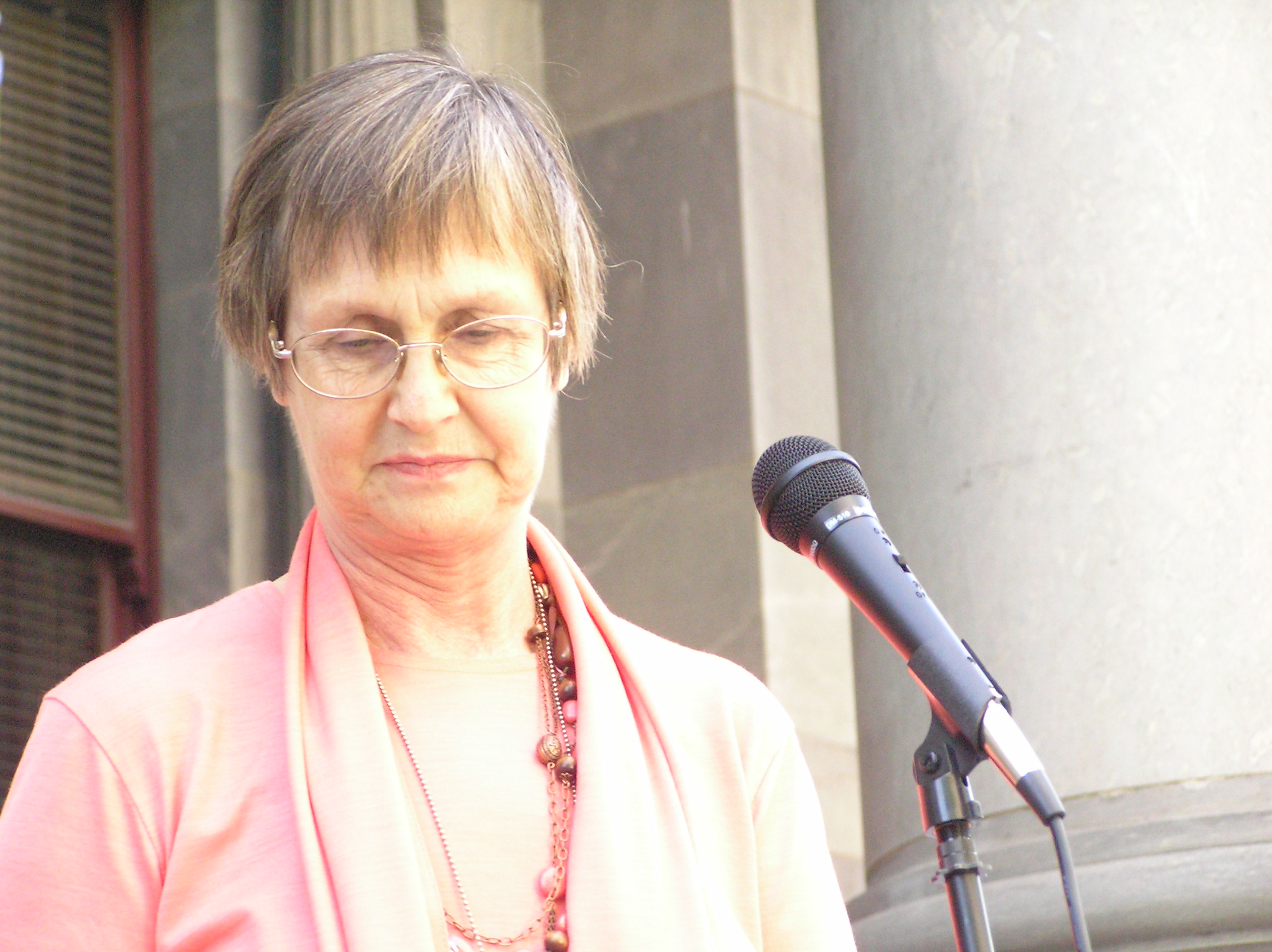
Kanck speaking at a rally on the steps of Parliament House, Adelaide in 2007.

Kanck was successful in amending the Commission of Inquiry (Children in State Care)(Children on APY Lands) Bill 2004. The "Mullighan Inquiry" (named after Commissioner Ted Mulligan) into the sexual abuse of children in state care and on the Anangu Pitjantjatjara Yankunyjatjara lands made 54 recommendations for action in its final report, published in March 2008. Kanck's amendments required the government to respond within three months to indicate which of the recommendations they would implement, and then to table an annual report about that implementation for every year for the following five years after receipt of the report, a first in terms of causing action on a government-commissioned report on Aboriginal Affairs.

During her time in parliament she served on the Social Development, Environment Resources & Development and Natural Resources Standing Committees, and numerous select committees, including chairing the Select Committee on the Impact of Peak Oil on South Australia which reported to the parliament late in 2008.

Kanck was successful in moving a motion to refer the matter of Multiple Chemical Sensitivity to the Social Development Committee. With a strong environmental focus in her politics she also succeeded in referring the matter of Marine Parks to the Environment Resources and Development Committee and actively campaigned against the Upper South-East Drylands Salinity Scheme during her time as a member of that Committee and the Natural Resources Committee.

Kanck announced her resignation on 7 November 2008 with her resignation taking effect on 31 January 2009. The party membership selected David Winderlich as her replacement in the Legislative Council.

She stood as one of the Candidates of the South Australian state election, 2010, in the third and unwinnable position in the list of Australian Democrats Candidates for the Legislative Council.

== Post Parliament ==
Kanck is a continuing social justice and human rights campaigner and environmentalist.

Since April 2009 Kanck has been the National President of Sustainable Population Australia, a Committee Member of the SA Branch of Sustainable Population Australia, President of SA Branch of Friends of the ABC (2009–2010) and now a Committee Member, a Patron of the Broken Hill Community Foundation and an honorary member of the Leaders Institute of South Australia, SA spokesperson for Families and Friends of Drug Law Reform, a member of the executive of the SA Council for Civil Liberties, State President of the Democrats in South Australia.

In December 2012 a breakaway faction of the Australian Democrats publicly claimed to have revoked her membership. However, the National Executive carried a motion stating she was a member of good standing. In July 2017 Ms Kanck became the Senior Deputy National President of the party. She ran as the party's No. 2 Senate Candidate in South Australia at the 2022 Australian federal election.
