= Paul Collier (activist) =

Australian disability activist

- Born: Paul Henry Collier; February 4, 1964
- Died: March 9, 2010 (aged 46); Australia
- Occupation: Disability activist
- Known for: Founder of the Dignity for Disability party

Paul Henry Collier (4 February 1964 – 9 March 2010) was an Australian disability activist and the founder of the Dignity for Disability party.

Collier was a quadriplegic, due to serious spinal injuries in a car accident on the way to his twenty-first birthday celebrations. He held a DPhil from the University of Oxford, and held advisory roles with the Australian Broadcasting Corporation and for the federal Minister for Disability. He founded the Dignity for Disability party in South Australia, standing as its candidate for the South Australian Legislative Council in 2006 and 2010. He died after a brain haemorrhage a few weeks before the 2010 election, in which his party gained enough votes for a seat in the council; this was taken by the second candidate on the ticket, Kelly Vincent. In 2013, a scholarship in Collier's name was set up to assist potential leaders with disabilities.
