= David Winderlich =

Australian teacher, public servant and politician

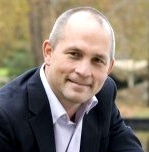

Member of the Legislative Council of South Australia
- In office 17 February 2009 – 20 March 2010
- Preceded by: Sandra Kanck
- Succeeded by: Tammy Franks

Personal details
- Born: 18 January 1964 (age 62) Adelaide, Australia
- Party: Australian Democrats (2009); Independent (2009–10)

David Nicholas Winderlich (born 18 January 1964), is an Australian teacher, public servant and politician who in February 2009 was the Australian Democrats nominee to fill a South Australian Legislative Council casual vacancy in a joint sitting of the Parliament of South Australia following the January 2009 parliamentary resignation of the incumbent Democrats member Sandra Kanck. Becoming an independent after nine months, he was the last Democrat to have sat in any Australian parliament. He was not re-elected at the 2010 election.

On 20 July 2009 Winderlich announced that, unless 1,000 new members joined the Democrats SA division by 23 November, he would leave the party and sit as an independent, which eventuated on 7 October 2009.

Winderlich announced that, as an independent, he would focus on three policy areas: governmental reform, rights and freedoms, e.g., for bikies, and a sustainable approach to the management of water resources in South Australia. In particular, he was opposed to the Port Stanvac Desalination Plant and to the Wellington Weir proposal.
