= Fair Land Tax – Tax Party =

The Fair Land Tax – Tax Party was a registered minor political party in South Australia led by Andrew Desyllas. Its platform consisted of more favourable land tax rates.

It ran at the 2010 state election with negligible results - 5,960 (0.6%) .

The party also contested the 2014 South Australian state election again with even lower negligible results finishing 3rd lowest with 1,363 votes (0.1%).

== See also ==
- List of political parties in Australia
- No Land Tax Campaign
