= Gamers 4 Croydon =

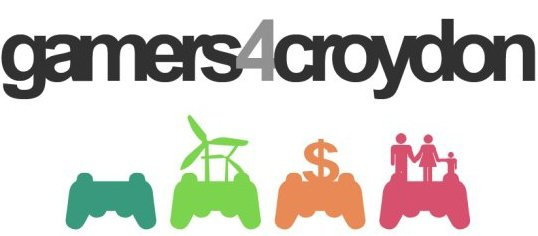
- Founded: 2009
- Dissolved: 2010
- Headquarters: Lot 296, 643 Main South Rd, Sellicks Hill, SA, 5174
- Ideology: Video game interests Progressivism; Environmentalism

Website
- Gamers 4 Croydon

Gamers 4 Croydon (G4C) was a minor political party in South Australia which contested the 2010 state election. The party disbanded shortly after the election and endorsed the Australian Sex Party and the Greens as possible replacements for support.

== History ==
The party had a strong anti-censorship message, particularly relating to the lack of an R18+ classification for video games in Australia. Founded in late 2009 and registered in 2010, its aim was to unseat South Australian Attorney-General Michael Atkinson from his seat of Croydon in the House of Assembly (lower house). Atkinson, having stepped down from the position of South Australian Attorney-General after the election was the only state Attorney-General who opposed the introduction of an R18+ classification, and was largely responsible for its absence, as to introduce such a rating required the unanimous approval of all Attorneys-General. Atkinson's successor, John Rau, took a different view and supported the introduction of an R18+ classification.

== Electoral results ==
=== 2010 SA election ===
The party ran six candidates at the 2010 South Australian state election. Kat Nicholson, a postgraduate journalism student, ran for the seat of Croydon. David Egge ran for the seat of Norwood, Tom Birdseye ran for the seat of Adelaide, Matthew Allpress ran for the seat of Light, and Ben Ernst ran for the seat of Mawson. Party president and software engineer Chris Prior ran for the Legislative Council (upper house).

In the lower house, the party performed best in Croydon (3.7 percent) and worst in Light (1.0 percent). In the upper house, the party received 0.8 percent (7994 votes) of the statewide vote. No candidates were elected.

== Mentions ==
After the election, Valve Software's Gabe Newell added a graffiti dedicated to Gamers 4 Croydon in one of the safe houses in Left 4 Dead 2 for their work on getting the R18+ classification introduced for video games.
