= Kelly Vincent =

Australian playwright, actor and politician

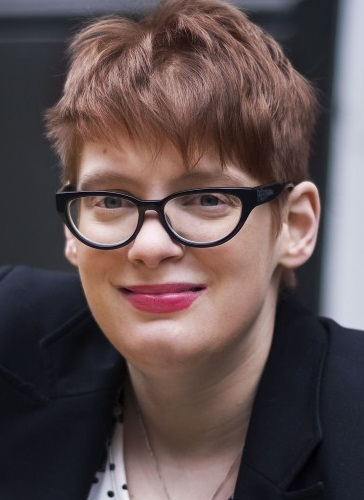

Member of the South Australian Legislative Council
- In office 20 March 2010 – 17 March 2018

Personal details
- Born: 25 October 1988 (age 38)
- Party: Dignity Party
- Website: www.kellyvincent.com.au

Kelly Leah Vincent (born 25 October 1988) is an Australian playwright, actor and former politician. She was elected at the 2010 state election for the Dignity Party to the eleventh and last seat for an eight-year term in the 22-member Legislative Council in the Parliament of South Australia.

Vincent has cerebral palsy and attended parliament in a wheelchair. Parliament House underwent installation of a specifically designed desk inside the chamber, as well as wheelchair accessible toilets and ramps.

== Early career ==
Vincent was a playwright and actor before being elected to parliament. She wrote and appeared in several "No Strings Attached" productions, a company dedicated to people with disabilities. She undertook high school work experience with the company in 2004, and has worked with the company on and off.

== Parliament ==
The party's upper house vote doubled from 0.6 percent to 1.2 percent at the 2010 state election, and after receiving preferences, Vincent was elected to the eleventh and last upper house seat. Vincent was listed second on the party's upper house ticket, but received the preferences of first candidate Paul Collier who died of a brain haemorrhage eleven days before the election.

Aged 21 at the time of election, Vincent was the youngest member of the Parliament of South Australia and the youngest woman elected to any Australian parliament. She stated she would "probably side with The Greens on certain issues".

Vincent was a member of a number of parliamentary committees including the Social Development Committee, Access to and Interaction with the Justice System for People with Disabilities, Disability Services Funding, Electoral Matters in South Australia, Joint Committee on the Operation of the Transplantation and Anatomy Act 1983, Access to the Education System for Students with Disabilities, and the Joint Committee on matters relating to Elder Abuse.

She was defeated in the 2018 state election even as the Dignity Party increased their primary vote. She blamed the introduction of optional preferential voting for her defeat.

== 2020 and 2021 ==
After leaving parliament, Kelly established True Ability Theatre Company with Alirio Zavarce in 2020. In 2021 she published her first book "Dandelion Heart." This is a collection of essays and poems.

== Awards ==
On 29 March 2017, Vincent won a Zonta Women of Achievement Award for Outstanding Achievement in Human Rights.
