= Dignity Party (South Australia) =

- Founder: David Holst
- Founded: 2004
- Dissolved: 2019
- Ideology: Equal rights
- Colors: Purple

Website
- Dignity Party website

The Dignity Party, previously known as Dignity for Disability or Dignity 4 Disability (D4D; known as Dignity for Disabled until 2010), was a political party in the Australian state of South Australia. The party had one parliamentary member, Kelly Vincent, elected at the 2010 state election to the eleventh and last seat for an eight-year term in the 22-member Legislative Council in the Parliament of South Australia. She was not re-elected in the 2018 state election.

In 2016, the name of the political party was changed to the Dignity Party to better represent equality in all forms including race, gender, age and sexual orientation.

The party was deregistered in November 2019, after being unable to prove it still had 200 members.

== 2006 election ==
The party first ran at the 2006 election under their previous name, Dignity for Disabled, with no successful candidates. Candidates were fielded in the lower house seats of Unley, Mitchell, Mawson, Norwood, Hartley, Newland, Morialta, Bright, Adelaide, and Wright, and fielded four candidates in the upper house. Their highest result in the lower house was in Wright as well as Bright at 2.4 percent (506 and 492 votes respectively). Their upper house vote was 0.6 percent (5615 votes).

== 2010 election ==
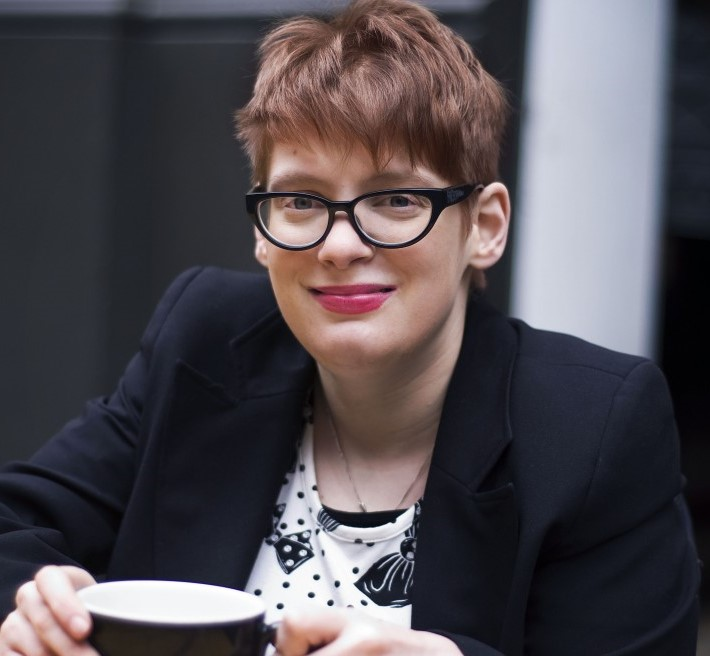
Kelly Vincent MLC

At the 2010 election, renamed Dignity for Disability ran for the lower house seats of Adelaide, Norwood and Wright with similar results. Four candidates again stood for the upper house. The upper house vote doubled from 0.6 percent to 1.2 percent, and after receiving preferences, candidate Kelly Vincent was elected to the eleventh and last upper house seat for an eight-year term. Vincent was listed second on the party's upper house ticket, but received the preferences of first candidate Paul Collier who died of a brain haemorrhage eleven days before the election. Vincent stated she would "probably side with the Greens on certain issues".

== 2014 election ==
Candidates were fielded at the 2014 election in the lower house seats of Adelaide, Dunstan, Elder, Heysen, Little Para, Unley and Waite, and fielded three upper house candidates. Their highest result in the lower house was in Heysen at 5.2 percent where the Greens overtook Labor on Dignity for Disability preferences. Their upper house vote was 0.9 percent.

The candidates in Adelaide and Waite, Anna Tree and Cathi Tucker, were previously Australian Democrats candidates. Tree ran in Colton in 2006 and 1997, Tucker (then Tucker-Lee) ran in Kavel in 2002 and 1997, Light in 1993, Norwood in 1989, Hartley in 1985, and federally in Mayo in 1996. Tucker-Lee received a 23.2 percent primary vote and a 43.7 percent two-candidate vote in Kavel in 1997.

== 2018 election ==
In July 2017, Kelly Vincent launched her bid for re-election alongside a team of upper house candidates announced by the Dignity Party. In October 2017, Dignity Party announced one of their largest ever lower house candidate teams in preparation for the South Australian Election, held on 17 March 2018. She was not re-elected.

== See also ==
- Disability in Australia
- Disability rights
- Human rights in Australia
- LGBT rights in Australia
- List of political parties in Australia
- People with Disability Australia
