= Save the RAH =

Save the RAH was a minor political party in South Australia, a single-issue party with the aim of stopping the relocation of Adelaide's main hospital, the Royal Adelaide Hospital (RAH). It ran candidates in 11 of the 47 seats in the House of Assembly at the 2010 state election. The party received 5,381 votes, or 0.55 percent of the statewide vote. In the Legislative Council, the party received 9,236 votes, or 0.97 percent. This was the highest upper house primary vote received by a party without winning a seat. The party is no longer registered.
