= FREE Australia Party =

Political party in Australia

The FREE Australia Party, fully the Freedom Rights Environment Educate Australia Party, is a defunct minor political party in South Australia founded by Paul Kuhn. It opposed SA Labor anti-bikie laws and promotes civil liberties. It ran at the 2010 state election with negligible results. The party contested the 2014 state election again with negligible results.

The FREE Australia Party is no longer registered.
