= Electoral results for the district of Mount Gambier =

South Australian district election results

This is a list of electoral results for the Electoral district of Mount Gambier in South Australian state elections.

== Members for Mount Gambier ==
Member	Party	Term
John Fletcher	Independent	1938–1958
Ron Ralston	Labor Party	1958–1962
Allan Burdon	Labor Party	1962–1975
Harold Allison	Liberal Party	1975–1993
Rory McEwen	Independent	2002–2010
Don Pegler	Independent	2010–2014
Troy Bell	Liberal	2014–2017
Troy Bell	Independent	2017–2025
Travis Fatchen	Independent	2026–present

== Election results ==
=== Elections in the 2020s ===
==== 2026 ====
2026 South Australian state election: Mount Gambier
Party	Candidate	Votes	%	±%
Independent	Travis Fatchen	5,979	27.1	+27.1
One Nation	Annie-Marie Loef	5,939	26.9	+26.9
Labor	Matthew Key	3,319	15.0	−5.6
Liberal	Lamorna Alexander	2,768	12.5	−16.5
Independent	Cody Scholes	1,401	6.3	+6.3
Greens	Sharon Holmes	1,050	4.8	+4.8
Independent	Kate Amoroso	930	4.2	+4.2
Legalise Cannabis	Martin Godfrey	271	1.2	+1.2
Family First	Rachael Kenyon	221	1.0	−3.7
Animal Justice	James Thomson	141	0.6	+0.6
Australian Family	Eleanor Day	85	0.4	+0.4
Total formal votes		22,104	93.0	−4.0
Informal votes		1,671	7.0	+4.0
Turnout		23,775	88.9	−0.4
Two-candidate-preferred result
Independent	Travis Fatchen	13,349	60.4	+60.4
One Nation	Annie-Marie Loef	8,755	39.6	+39.6
Independent gain from Independent				

==== 2022 ====
2022 South Australian state election: Mount Gambier
Party	Candidate	Votes	%	±%
Independent	Troy Bell	10,135	45.7	+7.0
Liberal	Ben Hood	6,433	29.0	+5.0
Labor	Katherine Davies	4,578	20.6	+10.8
Family First	Peter Heaven	1,032	4.7	+4.7
Total formal votes		22,178	97.0	
Informal votes		689	3.0	
Turnout		22,867	89.3	
Notional two-party-preferred count
Liberal	Ben Hood	14,139	63.8	−4.7
Labor	Katherine Davies	8,039	36.2	+4.7
Two-candidate-preferred result
Independent	Troy Bell	14,001	63.1	+2.9
Liberal	Ben Hood	8,177	36.9	−2.9
Independent hold		Swing	+2.9	

Distribution of preferences: Mount Gambier
Party	Candidate	Votes	Round 1		Round 2	
Party	Candidate	Votes	Dist.	Total	Dist.	Total
Quota (50% + 1)		11,090				
Independent	Troy Bell	10,135	+505	10,640	+3,361	14,001
Liberal	Ben Hood	6,433	+284	6,717	+1,460	8,177
Labor	Katherine Davies	4,578	+243	4,821	Excluded	
Family First	Peter Heaven	1,032	Excluded			

=== Elections in the 2010s ===
==== 2018 ====
2018 South Australian state election: Mount Gambier
Party	Candidate	Votes	%	±%
Independent	Troy Bell	8,314	38.7	+38.7
Liberal	Craig Marsh	5,163	24.0	−27.7
SA Best	Kate Amoroso	3,385	15.8	+15.8
Labor	Isabel Scriven	2,118	9.9	−1.0
Independent	Richard Sage	1,250	5.8	+5.8
Greens	Gavin Clarke	665	3.1	−1.7
Conservatives	Gregg Bisset	464	2.2	−2.9
Dignity	Lance Jones	121	0.6	+0.6
Total formal votes		21,480	94.4	−2.8
Informal votes		1,266	5.6	+2.8
Turnout		22,746	91.8	+2.5
Two-party-preferred result
Liberal	Craig Marsh	14,705	68.5	−2.9
Labor	Isabel Scriven	6,775	31.5	+2.9
Two-candidate-preferred result
Independent	Troy Bell	12,946	60.3	+60.3
Liberal	Craig Marsh	8,534	39.7	−31.7
Independent gain from Liberal				

2014 South Australian state election: Mount Gambier
Party	Candidate	Votes	%	±%
Liberal	Troy Bell	11,100	51.8	+9.2
Independent	Don Pegler	5,872	27.4	−8.6
Labor	Jim Maher	2,338	10.9	−1.6
Family First	Peter Heaven	1,095	5.1	+0.8
Greens	John Baseley	1,031	4.8	+2.5
Total formal votes		21,436	97.2	+1.1
Informal votes		616	2.8	−1.1
Turnout		22,052	92.3	−1.0
Two-party-preferred result
Liberal	Troy Bell		71.4	+5.9
Labor	Jim Maher		28.6	−5.9
Two-candidate-preferred result
Liberal	Troy Bell	12,251	57.2	+7.6
Independent	Don Pegler	9,185	42.8	−7.6
Liberal gain from Independent		Swing	+7.6	

2010 South Australian state election: Mount Gambier
Party	Candidate	Votes	%	±%
Liberal	Steve Perryman	9,282	42.6	+8.7
Independent	Don Pegler	7,842	36.0	+36.0
Labor	Viv Maher	2,724	12.5	−9.7
Family First	Henk Bruins	929	4.3	+0.2
Greens	Donella Peters	492	2.3	+0.4
Independent	Nick Fletcher	464	2.1	+2.1
Fair Land Tax	John Desyllas	48	0.2	+0.2
Total formal votes		21,781	96.1	
Informal votes		814	3.9	
Turnout		22,595	93.3	
Two-party-preferred result
Liberal	Steve Perryman	14,261	65.5	+9.9
Labor	Viv Maher	7,520	34.5	−9.9
Two-candidate-preferred result
Independent	Don Pegler	10,971	50.4	+50.4
Liberal	Steve Perryman	10,810	49.6	+5.8
Independent hold		Swing	N/A	

=== Elections in the 2000s ===
2006 South Australian state election: Mount Gambier
Party	Candidate	Votes	%	±%
Independent	Rory McEwen	7,351	35.6	−22.8
Liberal	Peter Gandolfi	7,002	33.9	+13.6
Labor	Brad Coates	4,582	22.2	+4.9
Family First	Laura Crowe-Owen	842	4.1	+4.1
Greens	Rob Mengler	381	1.8	+1.8
Democrats	Tony Hill	347	1.7	−0.5
Independent	Laura Cunningham	170	0.8	+0.8
Total formal votes		20,675	95.7	−1.6
Informal votes		923	4.3	+1.6
Turnout		21,598	93.3	−1.1
Two-party-preferred result
Liberal	Peter Gandolfi	11,490	55.6	
Labor	Brad Coates	9,185	44.4	
Two-candidate-preferred result
Independent	Rory McEwen	11,618	56.2	−20.4
Liberal	Peter Gandolfi	9,057	43.8	+20.4
Independent hold		Swing	−20.4	

2002 South Australian state election: Mount Gambier
Party	Candidate	Votes	%	±%
Independent	Rory McEwen	12,246	58.4	+35.9
Liberal	Roger Saunders	4,261	20.3	−21.2
Labor	Jim Maher	3,621	17.3	−4.3
Democrats	Ron Purvis	460	2.2	−9.6
One Nation	Mike Thomas	397	1.9	+1.9
Total formal votes		20,985	97.3	
Informal votes		581	2.7	
Turnout		21,566	94.4	
Two-candidate-preferred result
Independent	Rory McEwen	16,065	76.6	+26.5
Liberal	Roger Saunders	4,920	23.4	−26.5
Independent hold		Swing	+26.5	

=== Elections in the 1980s ===
1989 South Australian state election: Mount Gambier
Party	Candidate	Votes	%	±%
Liberal	Harold Allison	12,394	67.6	+8.7
Labor	Brenton Lynch	4,383	23.9	−15.0
Democrats	Glenn Taylor	380	2.2	+3.8
Call to Australia	Johannes Bastiaens	464	2.5	+2.5
Total formal votes		18,336	98.2	+1.0
Informal votes		337	1.8	−1.0
Turnout		18,673	94.9	−1.0
Two-party-preferred result
Liberal	Harold Allison	13,286	72.5	+12.6
Labor	Brenton Lynch	5,050	27.5	−12.6
Liberal hold		Swing	+12.6	

1985 South Australian state election: Mount Gambier
Party	Candidate	Votes	%	±%
Liberal	Harold Allison	10,292	58.9	+8.9
Labor	Peter Humphries	6,789	38.9	−6.1
Democrats	Glenn Taylor	380	2.2	−2.8
Total formal votes		17,461	97.2	
Informal votes		510	2.8	
Turnout		17,971	95.9	
Two-party-preferred result
Liberal	Harold Allison	10,457	59.9	+6.9
Labor	Peter Humphries	7,004	40.1	−6.9
Liberal hold		Swing	+6.9	

1982 South Australian state election: Mount Gambier
Party	Candidate	Votes	%	±%
Liberal	Harold Allison	8,444	50.0	−5.6
Labor	Kenneth Bonython	7,670	45.4	+1.0
Democrats	Meg Lees	767	4.5	+4.5
Total formal votes		16,881	96.3	−1.0
Informal votes		652	3.7	+1.0
Turnout		17,533	94.2	+0.4
Two-party-preferred result
Liberal	Harold Allison	8,816	52.2	−3.4
Labor	Kenneth Bonython	8,065	47.8	+3.4
Liberal hold		Swing	−3.4	

=== Elections in the 1970s ===
1979 South Australian state election: Mount Gambier
Party	Candidate	Votes	%	±%
Liberal	Harold Allison	8,983	55.6	+4.2
Labor	Graham Bath	7,162	44.4	−4.2
Total formal votes		16,145	97.3	−0.8
Informal votes		452	2.7	+0.8
Turnout		16,597	93.8	−1.1
Liberal hold		Swing	+4.2	

1977 South Australian state election: Mount Gambier
Party	Candidate	Votes	%	±%
Liberal	Harold Allison	8,181	51.4	+13.7
Labor	James Hennessy	7,726	48.6	+7.3
Total formal votes		15,907	98.1	
Informal votes		308	1.9	
Turnout		16,215	94.9	
Liberal hold		Swing	−1.7	

1975 South Australian state election: Mount Gambier
Party	Candidate	Votes	%	±%
Labor	Allan Burdon	4,983	43.7	−14.9
Liberal	Harold Allison	4,084	35.8	+2.4
Independent	Lloyd Hobbs	877	7.7	+7.7
National	Alwin Crafter	755	6.6	+6.6
Liberal Movement	Brian O'Connor	604	5.3	+5.3
Independent	Neville Ferguson	110	1.0	+1.0
Total formal votes		11,413	96.7	−0.9
Informal votes		392	3.3	+0.9
Turnout		11,805	94.8	−0.2
Two-party-preferred result
Liberal	Harold Allison	5,883	51.5	+15.5
Labor	Allan Burdon	5,530	48.5	−15.5
Liberal gain from Labor		Swing	+15.5	

1973 South Australian state election: Mount Gambier
Party	Candidate	Votes	%	±%
Labor	Allan Burdon	5,253	58.6	+3.8
Liberal and Country	David Rogers	2,566	25.1	+2.0
Independent	Brian O'Connor	1,671	16.3	−5.8
Total formal votes		10,228	97.6	−0.8
Informal votes		247	2.4	+0.8
Turnout		10,475	95.0	+0.8
Two-party-preferred result
Labor	Allan Burdon	6,546	64.0	+3.6
Liberal and Country	David Rogers	3,682	36.0	−3.6
Labor hold		Swing	+3.6	

1970 South Australian state election: Mount Gambier
Party	Candidate	Votes	%	±%
Labor	Allan Burdon	5,253	54.8	
Liberal and Country	David Rogers	2,210	23.1	
Independent	Graeme Gilbertson	2,117	22.1	
Total formal votes		9,580	98.4	
Informal votes		157	1.6	
Turnout		9,737	94.2	
Two-party-preferred result
Labor	Allan Burdon	5,782	60.4	
Liberal and Country	David Rogers	3,798	39.6	
Labor hold		Swing		

=== Elections in the 1960s ===
1968 South Australian state election: Mount Gambier
Party	Candidate	Votes	%	±%
Labor	Allan Burdon	5,567	58.6	−2.0
Liberal and Country	Archibald Scott	3,926	41.4	+2.0
Total formal votes		9,493	98.0	−0.2
Informal votes		198	2.0	+0.2
Turnout		9,691	95.6	+1.1
Labor hold		Swing	−2.0	

1965 South Australian state election: Mount Gambier
Party	Candidate	Votes	%	±%
Labor	Allan Burdon	5,399	60.6	−8.1
Liberal and Country	Mary Hill	3,507	39.4	+8.1
Total formal votes		8,906	98.2	−0.4
Informal votes		166	1.8	+0.4
Turnout		9,072	94.5	−0.5
Labor hold		Swing	−8.1	

1962 South Australian state election: Mount Gambier
Party	Candidate	Votes	%	±%
Labor	Ron Ralston	5,896	68.7	+10.4
Liberal and Country	Frank Haines	2,681	31.3	−10.4
Total formal votes		8,577	98.6	−0.7
Informal votes		124	1.4	+0.7
Turnout		8,701	95.0	−0.8
Labor hold		Swing	+10.4	
