= Candidates of the 2014 South Australian state election =

This is a list of candidates of the 2014 South Australian state election.

== Retiring MPs ==
=== Labor ===
- Lyn Breuer MHA (Giles)
- Patrick Conlon MHA (Elder)
- Robyn Geraghty MHA (Torrens)
- John Hill MHA (Kaurna)
- Michael O'Brien MHA (Napier)
- Gay Thompson MHA (Reynell)
- Michael Wright MHA (Lee)
- Carmel Zollo MLC

=== Liberal ===
- Ivan Venning MHA (Schubert)

=== Other ===
- Ann Bressington MLC

== House of Assembly ==
Sitting members are shown in bold text. Successful candidates are highlighted in the relevant colour.

Electorate	Held by	Labor candidate	Liberal candidate	Greens candidate	Family First candidate	Other candidates
Adelaide	Liberal	David O'Loughlin	**Rachel Sanderson**	Robert Simms		Anna Tree (D4D)
Ashford	Labor	**Steph Key**	Terina Monteagle	Christiana Griffith	Robyn Munro	Steve Samsom (FREE)
Bragg	Liberal	Ella Waters	**Vickie Chapman**	Ami Harrison		
Bright	Labor	**Chloë Fox**	David Speirs	Jamie Ryan	Steve Price	
Chaffey	Liberal	Mahanbir Grewal	**Tim Whetstone**	Jason Garrood	Yvonne Zeppel	
Cheltenham	Labor	**Jay Weatherill**	Jack Batty	Rebecca Galdies	Alex Tennikoff	
Colton	Labor	**Paul Caica**	Joe Barry	Andrew Payne	Kym McKay	
Croydon	Labor	**Michael Atkinson**	Glenda Noble	Cherie Hoyle	Nkweto Nkamba	
Davenport	Liberal	Lucie Lock-Weir	**Iain Evans**	Stephen Thomas	Natasha Edmonds	
Dunstan	Liberal	Jo Chapley	**Steven Marshall**	Michael Donato		Rick Neagle (D4D)
Elder	Labor	Annabel Digance	Carolyn Habib	Paul Petherick	Cosimo Russo	Nick Schumi (D4D)
Enfield	Labor	**John Rau**	Scott Roberts	Roger Levi	Lisa Hood	Andrew Stanko (Ind)
Finniss	Liberal	Melanie Smart	**Michael Pengilly**	Moira Jenkins	Bruce Hicks	
Fisher	Independent	Jake Neville	Sam Duluk	Malwina Wyra	Daryl van den Brink	**Bob Such** (Ind)
Flinders	Liberal	Mathew Deane	**Peter Treloar**	Felicity Wright	Grant Wilson	
Florey	Labor	**Frances Bedford**	Damian Wyld	Kim Thomson	Richard Bunting	
Frome	Independent	Marcus Connelly	Kendall Jackson	Rob Scott	Wendy Joyce	**Geoff Brock** (Ind)
Giles	Labor	Eddie Hughes	Bernadette Abraham	Alison Sentance	Cheryl Kaminski	
Goyder	Liberal	Elyse Ramsay	**Steven Griffiths**	Graham Smith	John Bennett	Bob Nicholls (Ind); Kim McWaters (Nat)
Hammond	Liberal	Lou Bailey	**Adrian Pederick**	Damien Pyne	Daniel Gutteridge	Rachel Titley (Nat)
Hartley	Labor	**Grace Portolesi**	Vincent Tarzia	Paul Birkwood	David Maegraith	
Heysen	Liberal	Paul Yiallouros	**Isobel Redmond**	Lynton Vonow		Amy Park (D4D)
Kaurna	Labor	Chris Picton	Ben Caudle	Maureen Cullen	Layla Nahavandi	Kym Richardson (Ind)
Kavel	Liberal	Richard Hilton	**Mark Goldsworthy**	Ian Grosser	Darryl Stott	
Lee	Labor	Stephen Mullighan	Liz Davies	Jo Seater	Denis Power	Gary Johanson (Ind); Melita Calone (Ind)
Light	Labor	**Tony Piccolo**	Cosie Costa	Terry Allen	Wendy Rose	
Little Para	Labor	**Lee Odenwalder**	Damien Pilkington	Samantha Blake	Lloyd Rowlands	Scott Whelan (D4D)
MacKillop	Liberal	Terry Soulmatis	**Mitch Williams**	Donella Peters	Bill Pomery	Steve Davies (Ind)
Mawson	Labor	**Leon Bignell**	Stephen Annells	Katie Wright	Geoff Doecke	
Mitchell	Labor	**Alan Sibbons**	Corey Wingard	Simon Roberts-Thomson	Barbara Bishop	Kris Hanna (Ind)
Morialta	Liberal	Clare Scriven	**John Gardner**	Scott Andrews	Sue Neal	
Morphett	Liberal	Tim Looker	**Duncan McFetridge**	Matthew Carey	Bob Randall	
Mount Gambier	Independent	Jim Maher	Troy Bell	John Baseley	Peter Heaven	**Don Pegler** (Ind)
Napier	Labor	Jon Gee	Robert Leggatt	Sam Miles	Gary Balfort	
Newland	Labor	**Tom Kenyon**	Glenn Docherty	Mark Nolan	Kate Horan	
Playford	Labor	**Jack Snelling**	Michael Santagata	Danny Carroll	Greg Evitts	
Port Adelaide	Labor	**Susan Close**	Brad Vermeer	Mark Seater	Bruce Hambour	
Ramsay	Labor	**Zoe Bettison**	Anthony Antoniadis	Brett Ferris	Paul Coombe	
Reynell	Labor	Katrine Hildyard	Heidi Greaves	Robyn Holtham	Nick Zollo	
Schubert	Liberal	Adam Slobodian	Stephan Knoll	Jasemin Rose	Tony Hurn	
Stuart	Liberal	Josh Vines	**Dan van Holst Pellekaan**	Brendan Fitzgerald	Sylvia Holland	
Taylor	Labor	**Leesa Vlahos**	Alexander Hyde	Kirsten Wahlstrom	Lenny Jessiman	
Torrens	Labor	Dana Wortley	Michael Manetta	Anne Walker	Owen Hood	
Unley	Liberal	Lara Golding	**David Pisoni**	Nikki Mortier		Joanne Blesing (D4D)
Waite	Liberal	Rebekah Huppatz	**Martin Hamilton-Smith**	Simon Hope	Steve Edmonds	Cathi Tucker (D4D)
West Torrens	Labor	**Tom Koutsantonis**	Serge Ambrose	Tim White	Tim Leeder	
Wright	Labor	**Jennifer Rankine**	Lyn Petrie	Tom Lowe	Mark Potter	Danyse Soester (Ind)

== Legislative Council ==
Sitting members are shown in bold text. Tickets that elected at least one member are highlighted in the relevant colour and successful candidates are indicated with an asterisk (*). Eleven of twenty-two seats were up for election. Labor defended four seats. The Liberals defended three seats. The Greens and Family First each defended one seat. The Nick Xenophon Team defended two seats, although only one of their sitting members (John Darley) was seeking re-election.

Labor candidates	Liberal candidates	Greens candidates	Family First candidates	Independent _{Nick Xenophon Team}	Dignity for Disability candidates
1. **Russell Wortley***; 2. **Ian Hunter***; 3. Tung Ngo*; 4. **Kyam Maher***; 5. Helen Rodwell; 6. Kristen Gilbertson; 7. Pajneek Sandhu	1. **Rob Lucas***; 2. **John Dawkins***; 3. **Michelle Lensink***; 4. Andrew McLachlan*; 5. Nicola Centofanti; 6. Louise Mathwin; 7. Rod Pearce; 8. Andrew Stratford	1. **Mark Parnell***; 2. Ruth Beach; 3. Nathan Daniell	1. **Dennis Hood***; 2. Elisa Colak	1. **John Darley***; 2. Connie Bonaros	1. Esther Simbi; 2. Garry Connor; 3. Tiffany Littler
National candidates	Katter candidates	Liberal Democrats candidates	Shooters & Fishers candidates	FREE Australia candidates	Fair Land Tax candidates
1. Grantley Mason Siviour; 2. Jonathan Pietzsch	1. Tony Musolino; 2. Leah O'Rourke	1. Michael Noack; 2. Peter Miller	1. Michael Hudson; 2. Jess Marks	1. Paul Kuhn; 2. Mark Lena	1. Andrew Desyllas; 2. Kon Toyias
Fishing & Lifestyle candidates	Stop Pop. Growth candidates	Multicultural Progress candidates	Independent _{Joseph Masika}	Independent _{Environment Education Disability}	Independent _{Powerful Communities}
1. Neil Armstrong; 2. Damien Smart	1. Bob Couch; 2. Alex Hodges	1. Trish Nguyen; 2. Lam Duc Vu	1. Joseph Masika; 2. Bob Dixon-Short	1. Karyn Prelc; 2. Michelle Drummond	1. Mark Henley; 2. Nicola Trenordan
Independent _{No Domestic Violence}	Independent _{Legal Voluntary Euthanasia}	Independent _{Mark Aldridge Alliance}	Independent _{Animal Justice}	Independent _{Palmer United}	Independent _{Your Voice Matters}
1. Annette Elliot; 2. Angela Heesom	1. Stephen Kenny; 2. Amy Orange	1. Mark Aldridge; 2. Dave Cook	1. Colin Thomas; 2. Sally Sutton	1. Ngoc Chau Hunyh; 2. Kristian Rees	1. Bill Denny; 2. Ian Smith; 3. Rob Atkinson
Single ticket candidates
John Browne
