= Electoral results for the district of Elder =

South Australian district election results

This is a list of electoral results for the Electoral district of Elder in South Australian state elections.

== Members for Elder ==
Member	Party	Term
David Wade	Liberal	1993–1997
Patrick Conlon	Labor	1997–2014
Annabel Digance	Labor	2014–2018
Carolyn Power	Liberal	2018–2022
Nadia Clancy	Labor	2022-present

== Election results ==
=== Elections in the 2020s ===
==== 2026 ====
2026 South Australian state election: Elder
Party	Candidate	Votes	%	±%
Labor	Nadia Clancy	12,364	50.2	+6.7
Liberal	Shawn van Groesen	4,450	18.0	−20.0
Greens	Stef Rozitis	3,569	14.5	+4.6
One Nation	Matt Mangelsdorf	3,540	14.4	+14.4
Family First	Rosanne Walston-Leo	399	1.6	−0.9
Fair Go	Linda Cheng	178	0.7	+0.7
Australian Family	Robert Lonie	139	0.6	+0.6
Total formal votes		24,639	97.1	+0.3
Informal votes		737	2.9	−0.3
Turnout		25,376	90.6	−0.1
Two-candidate-preferred result
Labor	Nadia Clancy	17,032	69.1	+13.5
Liberal	Shawn van Groesen	7,607	30.9	−13.5
Labor hold		Swing	+13.5	

==== 2022 ====
2022 South Australian state election: Elder
Party	Candidate	Votes	%	±%
Labor	Nadia Clancy	10,587	43.4	+10.1
Liberal	Carolyn Power	9,289	38.1	−1.3
Greens	Brock Le Cerf	2,402	9.9	+2.3
Liberal Democrats	Joshua Smith	730	3.0	+3.0
Family First	Cathryn Crosby-Wright	619	2.5	+2.5
Animal Justice	Matt Pastro	450	1.8	+1.8
Real Change	Eldert Hoebee	303	1.2	+1.2
Total formal votes		24,380	96.8	
Informal votes		805	3.3	
Turnout		25,185	90.7	
Two-party-preferred result
Labor	Nadia Clancy	13,552	55.6	+7.5
Liberal	Carolyn Power	10,828	44.4	−7.5
Labor gain from Liberal		Swing	+7.5	

Distribution of preferences: Elder
Party	Candidate	Votes	Round 1		Round 2		Round 3		Round 4		Round 5	
Party	Candidate	Votes	Dist.	Total	Dist.	Total	Dist.	Total	Dist.	Total	Dist.	Total
Quota (50% + 1)		12,191										
Labor	Nadia Clancy	10,587	+26	10,613	+111	10,724	+101	10,825	+242	11,067	+2,485	13,552
Liberal	Carolyn Power	9,289	+33	9,322	+51	9,373	+340	9,713	+528	10,241	+587	10,828
Greens	Brock Le Cerf	2,402	+70	2,472	+208	2,680	+168	2,848	+224	3,072	Excluded	
Liberal Democrats	Joshua Smith	730	+51	781	+33	814	+180	994	Excluded			
Family First	Cathryn Crosby-Wright	619	+59	678	+111	789	Excluded					
Animal Justice	Matt Pastro	450	+64	514	Excluded							
Real Change	Eldert Hoebee	303	Excluded									

=== Elections in the 2010s ===
==== 2018 ====
2018 South Australian state election: Elder
Party	Candidate	Votes	%	±%
Liberal	Carolyn Habib	9,812	42.3	−5.1
Labor	Annabel Digance	7,347	31.7	−2.3
SA-Best	Michael Slattery	3,257	14.0	+14.0
Greens	Jody Moate	1,679	7.2	−3.5
Conservatives	Shawn Van Groesen	669	2.9	−1.7
Dignity	Nick Schumi	433	1.9	−1.3
Total formal votes		23,197	96.7	−0.2
Informal votes		794	3.3	+0.2
Turnout		23,991	91.9	+2.5
Two-party-preferred result
Liberal	Carolyn Habib	12,609	54.4	+0.3
Labor	Annabel Digance	10,588	45.6	−0.3
Liberal hold		Swing	+0.3	

2014 South Australian state election: Elder
Party	Candidate	Votes	%	±%
Liberal	Carolyn Habib	8,828	41.8	+2.5
Labor	Annabel Digance	8,350	39.5	−1.8
Greens	Paul Petherick	1,990	9.4	−1.7
Family First	Cosimo Russo	1,035	4.9	+0.3
Dignity for Disability	Nick Schumi	910	4.3	+4.3
Total formal votes		21,113	96.4	+0.1
Informal votes		787	3.6	−0.1
Turnout		21,900	91.9	−0.5
Two-party-preferred result
Labor	Annabel Digance	10,945	51.8	−0.1
Liberal	Carolyn Habib	10,168	48.2	+0.1
Labor hold		Swing	−0.1	

2010 South Australian state election: Elder
Party	Candidate	Votes	%	±%
Labor	Patrick Conlon	8,805	43.3	−10.4
Liberal	Ben Turner	7,691	37.8	+10.4
Greens	Daryl Bullen	2,408	11.8	+5.4
Family First	Wendy Hay	1,003	4.9	−0.5
Democrats	Greg Croke	437	2.1	−0.7
Total formal votes		20,344	96.1	
Informal votes		791	3.9	
Turnout		21,135	92.4	
Two-party-preferred result
Labor	Patrick Conlon	10,904	53.6	−12.0
Liberal	Ben Turner	9,440	46.4	+12.0
Labor hold		Swing	−12.0	

=== Elections in the 2000s ===
2006 South Australian state election: Elder
Party	Candidate	Votes	%	±%
Labor	Patrick Conlon	10,618	55.2	+11.6
Liberal	Heidi Greaves	5,564	28.9	−9.1
Greens	Mark Arthurson	1,396	7.3	+3.4
Family First	Roy Brake	1,081	5.6	+1.5
Democrats	Greg Croke	564	2.9	−3.8
Total formal votes		19,223	95.9	+0.1
Informal votes		818	4.1	−0.1
Turnout		20,041	92.1	−1.4
Two-party-preferred result
Labor	Patrick Conlon	12,476	64.9	+11.2
Liberal	Heidi Greaves	6,747	35.1	−11.2
Labor hold		Swing	+11.2	

2002 South Australian state election: Elder
Party	Candidate	Votes	%	±%
Labor	Patrick Conlon	8,672	43.6	+8.6
Liberal	Heidi Harris	7,545	38.0	+0.8
Democrats	Greg Croke	1,340	6.7	−6.3
Family First	Peter Heaven	817	4.1	+4.1
Greens	Kate Cooper	777	3.9	+3.9
SA First	Bob Stewart	382	1.9	+1.9
One Nation	Colin Roediger	264	1.3	+1.3
Independent	Mnem Giles	78	0.4	+0.4
Total formal votes		19,875	95.8	
Informal votes		865	4.2	
Turnout		20,740	93.5	
Two-party-preferred result
Labor	Patrick Conlon	10,666	53.7	+1.8
Liberal	Heidi Harris	9,209	46.3	−1.8
Labor hold		Swing	+1.8	

=== Elections in the 1990s ===
1997 South Australian state election: Elder
Party	Candidate	Votes	%	±%
Liberal	David Wade	6,455	35.8	−12.1
Labor	Patrick Conlon	6,192	34.3	−3.0
Democrats	Chris Kennedy	2,262	12.5	+4.2
Independent	Bruce Hull	1,360	7.5	+7.5
Independent	Jo Stokes	698	3.9	+3.9
Independent	George Apap	671	3.7	+3.7
United Australia	Robert Low	417	2.3	+2.3
Total formal votes		18,055	94.2	−1.2
Informal votes		1,121	5.8	+1.2
Turnout		19,176	91.5	
Two-party-preferred result
Labor	Patrick Conlon	9,493	52.6	+6.1
Liberal	David Wade	8,562	47.4	−6.1
Labor gain from Liberal		Swing	+6.1	

1993 South Australian state election: Elder
Party	Candidate	Votes	%	±%
Liberal	David Wade	9,098	48.0	+8.2
Labor	Paul Holloway	7,070	37.3	−11.2
Democrats	Donald Knott	1,520	8.0	−3.4
Independent	Michael Nelson	547	2.9	+2.9
Independent	Terrence Leane	365	1.9	+1.9
Independent	Reece Dobie	193	1.0	+1.0
Independent	Dean Le Poidevin	142	0.7	+0.7
Total formal votes		18,935	95.3	−2.1
Informal votes		925	4.7	+2.1
Turnout		19,860	93.8	
Two-party-preferred result
Liberal	David Wade	10,113	53.4	+8.0
Labor	Paul Holloway	8,822	46.6	−8.0
Liberal gain from Labor		Swing	+8.0	
