= Results of the 2014 South Australian state election (Legislative Council) =

2014 South Australian state election (Legislative Council)
- 15 March 2014

11 of the 22 seats in the Legislative Council 11 seats needed for a majority
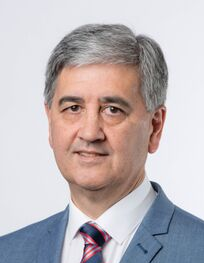

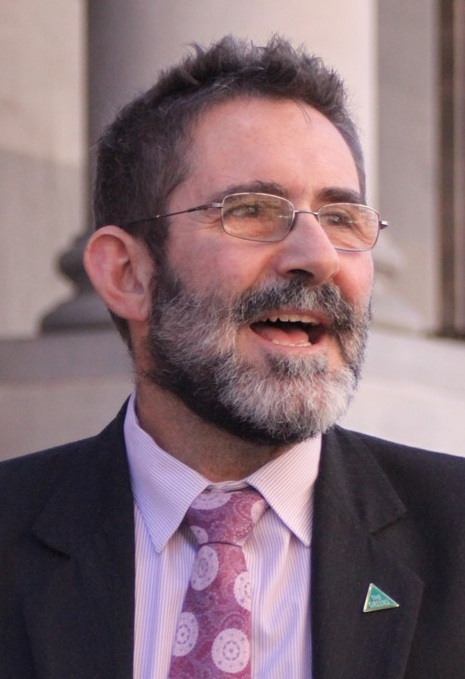

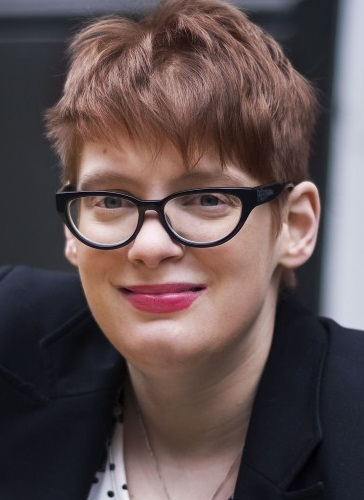

	First party	Second party	Third party
Leader	Rob Lucas	Gail Gago	Mark Parnell
Party	Liberal	Labor	Greens
Seats before	7	8	2
Seats won	4	4	1
Seats after	8	8	2
Seat change	▲1	Steady	Steady
Popular vote	363,809	312,944	65,215
Percentage	36.0%	31.0%	6.50%
Swing	▼3.40pp	▼6.30pp	▼0.10pp
	Fourth party	Fifth party	Sixth party
	FFP
Leader	None	Kelly Vincent	None
Party	Family First	Dignity	Xenophon Team
Seats before	2	1	New
Seats won	1	0	1
Seats after	2	1	1
Seat change	Steady	Steady	▲1
Popular vote	44,015	9,367	130,289
Percentage	4.40%	0.90%	12.9%
Swing	▼0.10pp	▼0.30pp.	▲12.9pp.

This is a list of results for the Legislative Council at the 2014 South Australian state election.

== Results ==
The Liberal Party gained one seat from the No Pokies who had dissolved in 2014 and formed as the Xenophon Team.

John Darley, who had replaced Nick Xenophon when he resigned in October 2007 and successfully moved to the Australian Senate, was number one on the Xenophon Team and retained his seat. Despite attaining 12.9% they were unable to secure a 2nd seat unlike in 2006 when under the No Pokies their vote was 20.5%. In 2015, Nick Xenophon Group (NXG) changed its name to Nick Xenophon Team (NXT).

2014 South Australian state election: Legislative Council
Party	Candidate	Votes	%	±%
Liberal	1. Rob Lucas (elected 1); 2. John Dawkins (elected 4); 3. Michelle Lensink (elected 6); 4. Andrew McLachlan (elected 8); 5. Nicola Centofanti; 6. Louise Mathwin; 7. Rod Pearce; 8. Andrew Stratford	363,809	36.0	−3.4
Labor	1. Russell Wortley (elected 2); 2. Ian Hunter (elected 5); 3. Tung Ngo (elected 7); 4. Kyam Maher (elected 11); 5. Helen Rodwell; 6. Kristen Gilbertson; 7. Pajneek Sandhu	312,944	31.0	−6.3
Independent Xenophon Team	1. John Darley (elected 3); 2. Connie Bonaros	130,289	12.9	+12.9
Greens	1. Mark Parnell (elected 9); 2. Ruth Beach; 3. Nathan Daniell	65,215	6.5	−0.1
Family First	1. Dennis Hood (elected 10); 2. Elisa Colak	44,015	4.4	-0.0
Independent Palmer United	1. Ngoc Chau Huynh; 2. Kristian Rees	16,603	1.6	+1.6
Shooters and Fishers	1. Michael Hudson; 2. Jess Marks	13,608	1.3	+0.5
Dignity for Disability	1. Esther Simbi; 2. Garry Connor; 3. Tiffany Littler	9,367	0.9	−0.3
Independent Animal Justice	1. Colin Thomas; 2. Sally Sutton	8,787	0.9	+0.9
Fishing and Lifestyle	1. Neil Armstrong; 2. Damien Smart	7,999	0.8	+0.8
Liberal SA Democrat	1. Michael Noack; 2. Peter Miller	6,091	0.6	+0.6
Independent Legal Voluntary Euthanasia	1. Stephen Kenny; 2. Amy Orange	4,533	0.4	+0.4
Independent Your Voice Matters	1. Bill Denny; 2. Ian Smith; 3. Rob Atkinson	4,278	0.4	+0.4
Stop Population Growth Now	1. Bob Couch; 2. Alex Hodges	3,884	0.4	+0.4
FREE Australia	1. Paul Kuhn; 2. Mark Lena	2,831	0.3	−0.1
Independent Mark Aldridge Alliance	1. Mark Aldridge; 2. Dave Cook	2,789	0.3	+0.3
Independent No Domestic Violence	1. Annette Elliot; 2. Angela Heesom	2,299	0.2	+0.2
National	1. Grantley Mason Siviour; 2. Jonathan Pietzsch	2,268	0.2	−0.2
Independent Joseph Masika	1. Joseph Masika; 2. Bob Dixon-Short	1,944	0.2	+0.2
Multicultural Progress	1. Trish Nguyen; 2. Lam Duc Vu	1,560	0.2	+0.2
Katter's Australian	1. Tony Musolino; 2. Leah O'Rourke	1,503	0.1	+0.1
Independent Environment Education Disability	1. Karyn Prelc; 2. Michelle Drummond	1,499	0.1	+0.1
Fair Land Tax	1. Andrew Desyllas; 2. Kon Toyias	1,363	0.1	−0.5
Independent Powerful Communities	1. Mark Henley; 2. Nicola Trenorden	1,341	0.1	+0.1
Independent	John Browne	112	0.01	+0.01
Total formal votes		1,010,931	96.1	+1.9
Informal votes		41,508	3.9	−1.9
Turnout		1,052,439	92.1	−0.8

== See also ==
- Candidates of the 2014 South Australian state election
- Members of the South Australian Legislative Council, 2014–2018
