= William Thomas Denny =

Australian army officer and public servant (born 1949)

William Thomas Denny AM BM
- Denny in 2025
- Born: 16 October 1949 (age 77); Adelaide, South Australia, Australia
- Education: Sacred Heart College
- Political party: Independent (2014)
- Relatives: William Joseph Denny (grandfather)
- Military service
- Allegiance: Australia
- Branch: Australian Army
- Service years: 1968–1990
- Rank: Lieutenant colonel
- Service number: 44892
- Unit: 86 Transport Platoon
- Conflicts: Vietnam War

William Thomas Denny (born 16 October 1949) is an Australian former army officer, lawyer and public servant.

Denny was raised in Adelaide, South Australia, and he is the grandson of William Joseph Denny, who was both a veteran of First World War and a politician. After attending Sacred Heart College, Denny enlisted in the Australian Regular Army in 1968. He would be deployed to South Vietnam from 1971 to 1972 with 86 Transport Platoon. He later served as an aide-de-camp to Governor-General John Kerr. He witnessed the dismissal of Prime Minister Gough Whitlam in 1975. In 1990, Denny retired from the army with the rank of lieutenant colonel.

Denny subsequently took up business and administrative portfolios and attained a Bachelor of Laws and Legal Practice with distinction in 2007. In 2010, he was called to practice law in South Australia. Denny was one of the founding members of the South Australian Veterans' Advisory Council (VAC) in 2008 and the first director of Veterans SA. In 2014, he ran for the South Australian Legislative Council election as the lead candidate for the independent political party Your Voice Matters. In 2022, Denny was appointed to the newly reformed South Australian VAC.

== Early life and education ==
William Thomas Denny was born on 16 October 1949 and raised in Adelaide, South Australia. He was the son of William Denny, a Second World War fighter pilot, and the grandson of William Joseph Denny, a First World War veteran and politician. Denny is of Italian, Irish, and English heritage, and his family came to South Australia in 1855. He attended Sacred Heart College in Somerton Park from 1958 to 1965.

== Military career ==
On 5 July 1968, Denny enlisted into the Australian Regular Army. After completing Officer Cadet School in Portsea, he was commissioned as a second lieutenant. Denny left Adelaide for South Vietnam on 26 January 1971, as part of the Australian involvement in the Vietnam War. Three days later, he was assigned the role of deputy commander of 86 Transport Platoon, Royal Australian Army Service Corps. His unit was initially stationed at Nui Dat, to serve in the Task Force Maintenance Area. As an operations officer, Denny would coordinate helicopter resupply operations for the Australian forces. This meant that he became part of three generations of his family who had served in wars.

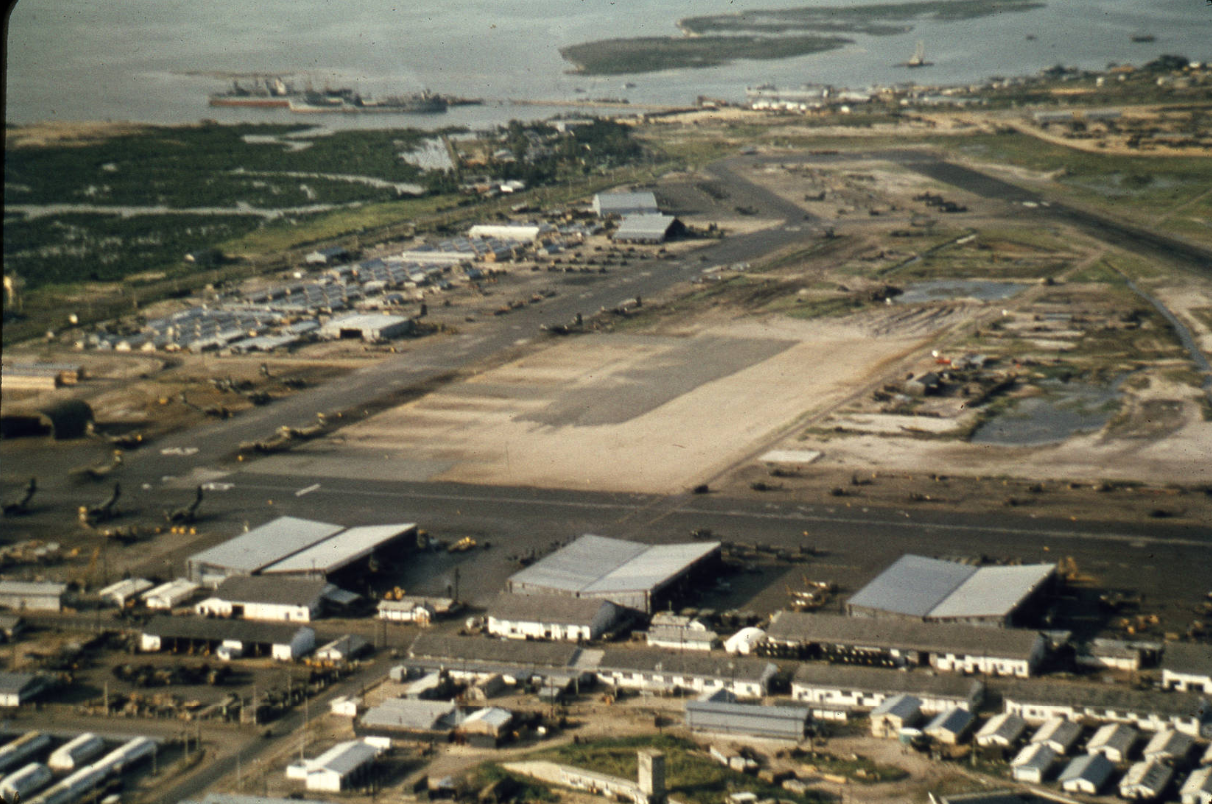
Vung Tau Air Base in 1967

In July 1971, Denny returned to Vung Tau Air Base to be involved in transport operations between Australian and allied bases and locations in South Vietnam, including Saigon, Long Binh, Bà Rịa, Xuyên Mộc and Phước Hải. He also undertook transport operations along Route 2 towards Bình Ba and Garth. During his deployment, he spent a short period attached to an American transport battalion at Long Binh, before returning to 86 Transport Platoon.

Denny remained with the platoon during the final phase of the Australian withdrawal from South Vietnam. In January 1972, he participated in arrangements to hand over the Australian facility at Vung Tau to the Army of the Republic of Vietnam. He later took part in the final convoy from the Australian base to DeLong pier, from where the members of the platoon travelled by landing craft to HMAS Sydney (R17). Denny left Vietnam aboard Sydney on 29 February 1972 as the Australian withdrawal was completed.

Denny eventually returned to Australia and spent the rest of his military service with the army, rising to the rank of captain. He served as the aide-de-camp to the Governor-General of Australia, based at Government House in Canberra. Consequently, on 11 November 1975, Denny witnessed Governor-General John Kerr dismiss Prime Minister Gough Whitlam, and replacing him with Malcolm Fraser. Afterwards, he also was also stationed in Papua New Guinea and exchanged duties with the British Army in West Germany. He continued to serve in the army until his retirement in 1990 as a lieutenant colonel.

== Public service ==
After his military career, Denny took up positions managing companies within manufacturing, the retirement villages business, the transport business, and in real estate. In addition, he became part of the board of Reconciliation South Australia in 2005. The next year, he became a ministerial adviser to South Australian Attorney-General Michael Atkinson. Denny enrolled at a university and successfully graduated with a Bachelor of Laws and Legal Practice with honours in 2007.

In April 2008, Denny joined as one of the founding members of the South Australian Veterans' Advisory Council (VAC) which was presided over by former Governor Eric Neal. At the same time, he was appointed the first director of Veterans SA founded by the Rann government. In 2010, he was admitted as a barrister and solicitor of the Supreme Court of South Australia.

Aboriginal and Torres Strait Islander War Memorial in Adelaide on 26 May 2026

Denny and Neal jointly served as co-chairpersons in the fund raising campaign for the Aboriginal and Torres Strait Islander War Memorial at Torrens Parade Ground. The memorial was unveiled on 14 November 2013 by the then Governor-General Quentin Bryce. Denny also served as the chairperson of ANZAC Day Commemoration Council from 24 June 2013 until 23 June 2016.

Denny speaking in Adelaide, 2014

Denny announced his intention to run for the South Australian Legislative Council in January 2014. Running on the independent Your Voice Matters ticket with fellow candidates Ian Smith and Rob Atkinson, he failed to win election. He resigned from his position as director of Veterans SA in the same year. In 2014, he had become the colonel commandant for the Central Region of the Royal Australian Corps of Transport.

In April 2015, Denny commented on the consultation for the redevelopment plan of the Repatriation General Hospital site into a private health precinct. In the same year, Denny joined the South Australian branch of the Defence Force Welfare Association.

In March 2017, Denny attended the repatriation of the remains of Private Miller Mack, an Aboriginal First World War veteran, to Raukkan. Private Mack was initially buried at West Terrace Cemetery in Adelaide.

In 2018, Denny had become the deputy president of RSL South Australia. On 4 February 2019, he testified as a witness in the Productivity Commission hearings in Adelaide regarding the matter of veterans' compensation and rehabilitation. In 2020, he had already been appointed as executive director of a collaborative veterans' oral history project.

On 2 December 2022, Denny had been appointed one of eight members of the reconstituted South Australian Veterans' Advisory Council by Veterans' Affairs Minister Geoff Brock. In 2025, he will become RSL ambassador of South Australia, the Northern Territory and Broken Hill. He has retired from VAC at its meeting on 19 June 2025.

Other community activities of Denny include being the chair of RSL ANZAC Day Committee, the founder of ANZAC Eve Youth Vigil and founder of the Vietnam War Memorial Committee. He is an ambassador of Reconciliation South Australia and the patron of ANZAC Eve Youth Vigil, the National Servicemen's Association and the Military Vehicle Preservation Society.

== Honours and awards ==
Denny was appointed a Justice of the Peace in New South Wales in 1988 and later in South Australia in 1994. In recognition of his contribution to the community and to veterans, including his involvement in the expansion of Anzac Day commemorations in South Australia, he was appointed a Member of the Order of Australia (AM) in the 2006 Australia Day Honours.

In 2014, Denny was a finalist for the Australian of the Year award in South Australia. In the same year, he received the Bravery Medal (BM) for his actions during an attempted rescue following a fatal car accident at Wannon, Victoria. In 2015, Denny received the RSL ANZAC of the Year Award for his contribution to the veterans' community. In 2022, he was nominated as a finalist for Senior Australian of the Year in recognition of his community and veterans' advocacy in South Australia.

== Personal life ==
Denny is married and has children and grandchildren. The family name William Denny has persisted through five successive generations. William Thomas Denny is the third to carry the family name, his son William Edward Denny is the fourth to carry the family name, and his grandson is the fifth.

When his daughter was born in Germany, Denny explained that he took some soil from Australia to Germany to ensure she had contact with Australian soil right from birth. The middle name of his son, Edward, was named after the Australian bushranger Ned Kelly. When baptising his son, Denny took water from the Murray River, the Snowy River, and Eleven Mile Creek.

While Denny was honoured with a medal for his acts of bravery, his son William Edward Denny was awarded the Commendation for Brave Conduct on 19 August 2015. This was due to his action towards the defence of two women who had been attacked in Adelaide on 5 November 2014. He managed to restrain the assailant even after warning that the person was armed with a knife.
