= Electoral results for the district of Gordon (South Australia) =

South Australian district election results

This is a list of electoral results for the Electoral District of Gordon in South Australian elections.

== Members for Gordon ==
Member	Party	Term
Harold Allison	Liberal	1993–1997
Rory McEwen	Independent	1997–2002

== Election results ==
=== Elections in the 1990s ===
1997 South Australian state election: Gordon
Party	Candidate	Votes	%	±%
Liberal	Scott Dixon	8,360	41.5	−26.7
Independent	Rory McEwen	4,530	22.5	+22.5
Labor	Andrew Godfrey	4,344	21.6	−2.3
Democrats	Simon Mill	2,382	11.8	+6.8
Independent	Bronte Whelan	518	2.6	−0.2
Total formal votes		20,134	96.7	−1.2
Informal votes		679	3.3	+1.2
Turnout		20,813	92.9	
Two-party-preferred result
Liberal	Scott Dixon	12,543	62.3	−9.2
Labor	Andrew Godfrey	7,591	37.7	+9.2
Two-candidate-preferred result
Independent	Rory McEwen	10,093	50.1	+50.1
Liberal	Scott Dixon	10,041	49.9	−21.6
Independent gain from Liberal		Swing	N/A	

1993 South Australian state election: Gordon
Party	Candidate	Votes	%	±%
Liberal	Harold Allison	13,401	69.0	+1.4
Labor	Mark Johnson	4,514	23.2	−0.7
Democrats	Regine Andersen	962	5.0	−1.0
Independent	Bronte Whelan	552	2.8	+2.8
Total formal votes		19,429	98.0	−0.2
Informal votes		396	2.0	+0.2
Turnout		19,825	94.6	
Two-party-preferred result
Liberal	Harold Allison	14,031	72.2	−0.3
Labor	Mark Johnson	5,398	27.8	+0.3
Liberal hold		Swing	−0.3	
