= Electoral results for the district of Gordon =

Electoral results for the district of Gordon may refer to:

- Electoral results for the district of Gordon (New South Wales), a former electorate of the New South Wales Legislative Assembly
- Electoral results for the district of Gordon (South Australia), a former electorate of the South Australian House of Assembly
