= Rory McEwen =

Rory McEwen may refer to:

- Rory McEwen (politician) (born 1948), Australian politician
- Rory McEwen (artist) (1932–1982), Scottish artist and musician
