= Travis Fatchen =

Australian politician (born 1972)

Travis Fatchen MP

Member of the South Australian House of Assembly for Mount Gambier
- Incumbent
- Assumed office 21 March 2026
- Preceded by: Troy Bell

Personal details
- Born: Travis Fatchen; 1972 (age 53) Mount Gambier, South Australia
- Party: Independent

Travis Antony Fatchen (born 1972) is an Australian politician, and has represented the district of Mount Gambier in the South Australian House of Assembly since the 2026 state election. Fatchen is an independent politician, and had previously served as the office manager for Troy Bell, Mount Gambier's previous MP, for eleven years.

== Early life ==
Fatchen was born in Mount Gambier, South Australia in 1972. (Note: Fatchen was 52 as of October 2025, and 53 as of March 2026.)

== Career ==
Fatchen has served on the board of the Mount Gambier Pioneers, as a team manager for the Apollo Football Club, and as a chairperson and judge for the local Automotive Industry Group. Fatchen worked in the automotive industry for twenty-five years before working as the office manager for Mount Gambier MP Troy Bell's electorate office for eleven years. Bell resigned from the House of Assembly in September 2025 after being found guilty of theft and fraud and having an appeal to the Supreme Court dismissed, leaving the Mount Gambier seat vacant, as the state election was scheduled for March 2026.

Fatchen announced his candidacy for Mount Gambier in the 2026 election in October 2025, standing as an independent candidate. He has advocated for local infrastructure upgrades in Mount Gambier, including the construction of a cancer radiation centre in the city. Fatchen has stated his admiration for Bell, and said he was "genuinely shocked" by the findings in Bell's court case. In an opinion poll for Mount Gambier conducted by UComms in January 2026, Fatchen had the largest primary vote, polling 30.2%. (Note: Undecided voters are excluded from this calculation. With undecided voters included, Fatchen polled 23.1% of the primary vote.) Fatchen won the seat at the 2026 state election, becoming the new MP for Mount Gambier.

== Notes ==
South Australian House of Assembly
Preceded by Troy Bell	Member for Mount Gambier; 2026–present	Incumbent
