= Harold Allison =

Australian politician (1930–2025)

The Honourable Harold Allison
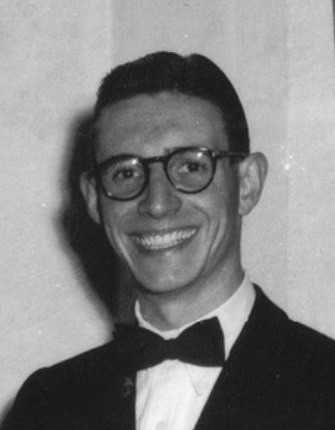

Minister of Education
- In office 18 September 1979 – 10 November 1982
- Premier: David Tonkin
- Preceded by: Don Hopgood
- Succeeded by: Lynn Arnold

Minister of Aboriginal Affairs
- In office 18 September 1979 – 5 March 1982

Member of the South Australian House of Assembly (Gordon 1993–97)
- In office 12 July 1975 – 11 October 1997
- Preceded by: Allan Burdon
- Succeeded by: Rory McEwen
- Constituency: Mount Gambier

Personal details
- Born: 10 July 1930
- Died: 28 June 2025 (aged 94) Adelaide, South Australia, Australia
- Party: Liberal Party

Harold Allison (10 July 1930 – 28 June 2025) was an Australian politician who represented the South Australian House of Assembly seats of Mount Gambier from 1975 to 1993 and Gordon from 1993 to 1997 for the Liberal Party. He was a school teacher prior to entering politics.

Allison died on 28 June 2025, at the age of 94.

South Australian House of Assembly
Preceded by Allan Burdon	Member for Mount Gambier; 1975–1993	Abolished
New seat	Member for Gordon; 1993–1997	Succeeded by Rory McEwen
