= Multicultural Progress Party =

Former Australian political party

The Multicultural Progress Party is a defunct minor political party in South Australia led by Lam Duc Vu and Trish Nguyen from IFIG Australia (Melbourne). The party contested the 2014 state election in the upper house with 1,560 votes (0.15 percent).

== See also ==
- List of political parties in Australia
- Unity Party (Australia)
