= Nadia Clancy =

Australian politician

The Honourable Nadia Clancy MP
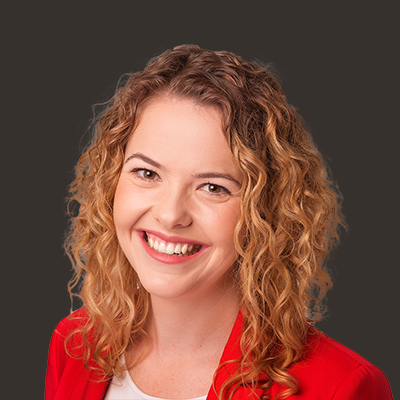

Minister for Small and Family Business
- Incumbent
- Assumed office 25 March 2026
- Premier: Peter Malinauskas
- Preceded by: Andrea Michaels

Minister for Multicultural Affairs
- Incumbent
- Assumed office 25 March 2026
- Premier: Peter Malinauskas
- Preceded by: Zoe Bettison

Assistant Minister for Mental Health and Suicide Prevention
- In office 18 September 2025 – 25 March 2026
- Minister: Chris Picton
- Premier: Peter Malinauskas
- Preceded by: Position established
- Succeeded by: Position abolished

Member of the South Australian House of Assembly for Elder
- Incumbent
- Assumed office 19 March 2022
- Preceded by: Carolyn Power
- Majority: 55.6 per cent

Personal details
- Born: 1986 (age 39–40) Bedford Park, South Australia
- Party: Labor
- Education: Bachelor of Arts in Media and Communications
- Alma mater: University of South Australia
- Committees: Economic and Finance; Public Works
- Website: nadiaclancy.com.au

Nadia Peace Clancy is an Australian politician and former political adviser. She has been a Labor member of the South Australian House of Assembly since the 2022 state election, representing Elder. On 19 September 2025 she was appointed Assistant Minister for Mental Health and Suicide Prevention in a Cabinet reshuffle. She is a member of Labor's left faction.

Clancy was the unsuccessful Labor candidate for the federal division of Boothby in the 2019 Australian federal election. At the 2022 election, she defeated the incumbent Liberal Party member Carolyn Power with a swing of 7.5 per cent. Power had held the seat since 2018 with a margin of 1.9 per cent.

Clancy has a Bachelor of Arts in media and communications, and prior to her election to Parliament she had worked in communications and marketing roles for not-for-profit organisations and as an advisor to federal and state Labor politicians.

== Early life and education ==
Nadia Peace Clancy was born at Flinders Medical Centre at Bedford Park in 1986, and grew up in the southern Adelaide suburb of Somerton Park. Her mother, Rosemary Clancy, served for a decade first as a councillor then mayor of Brighton Council, and stood as the unsuccessful Labor Party candidate for the seat of Morphett at the 2002 state election and the seat of Mitchell at the 2006 state election.

Clancy attended Paringa Park Primary School and Brighton Secondary School before completing a Bachelor of Arts in media and communications at the University of South Australia.

== Career ==
=== Early career ===
Clancy was employed in communications and marketing roles at Women's Safety Services SA, the Fred Hollows Foundation and headspace National Youth Mental Health Foundation before becoming an electorate officer, media adviser, and policy adviser to various Labor members of parliament, including then Minister for Foreign Affairs Kevin Rudd, Chief Minister of the Australian Capital Territory Katy Gallagher and federal Labor member Mark Butler. Her policy adviser experience includes foreign affairs, health, housing and homelessness and the environment.

In 2009, she moved to Renmark in the South Australian Riverland to work as a producer for the ABC.

=== Political career ===
Clancy stood as the Labor candidate for the seat of Boothby in the 2019 federal election, losing to the incumbent Liberal Party member Nicolle Flint, who had held the seat since 2016. Clancy achieved a two-party-preferred vote (2PP) of 48.62 per cent from 34.63 per cent of the first-preference votes. Prior to nominating as the Labor candidate for Boothby she had been a candidate to be a councillor in the upcoming election for the Holdfast Bay council.

Clancy was the Labor candidate for the seat of Elder at the 2022 state election, when she received 55.6 per cent of the 2PP, achieving an 7.5 per cent swing to the Labor Party. Her share of the first-preference votes was 43.4 per cent. She defeated the Liberal assistant minister for Domestic and Family Violence, Carolyn Power, who had held the seat since 2018 on a margin of 1.9 per cent. Clancy was supported in her campaign by Emily's List Australia.

On 19 September 2025 she was appointed Assistant Minister for Mental Health and Suicide Prevention in a Cabinet reshuffle.

Clancy has been a member of the parliamentary economic and finance and public works committees since 3 May 2022. She is a member of the party's left faction.

== Other activities ==
Clancy has been a volunteer with two not-for-profits: Puddle Jumpers – a not-for-profit organisation supporting the social development needs of society's most vulnerable children and young people; and Treasure Boxes – which provides vital essentials to babies, children and teens living in disadvantage in the community.

== Footnotes ==
South Australian House of Assembly
Preceded by Carolyn Power	Member for Elder; 2022–present	Incumbent
