= Carolyn Power =

Australian politician

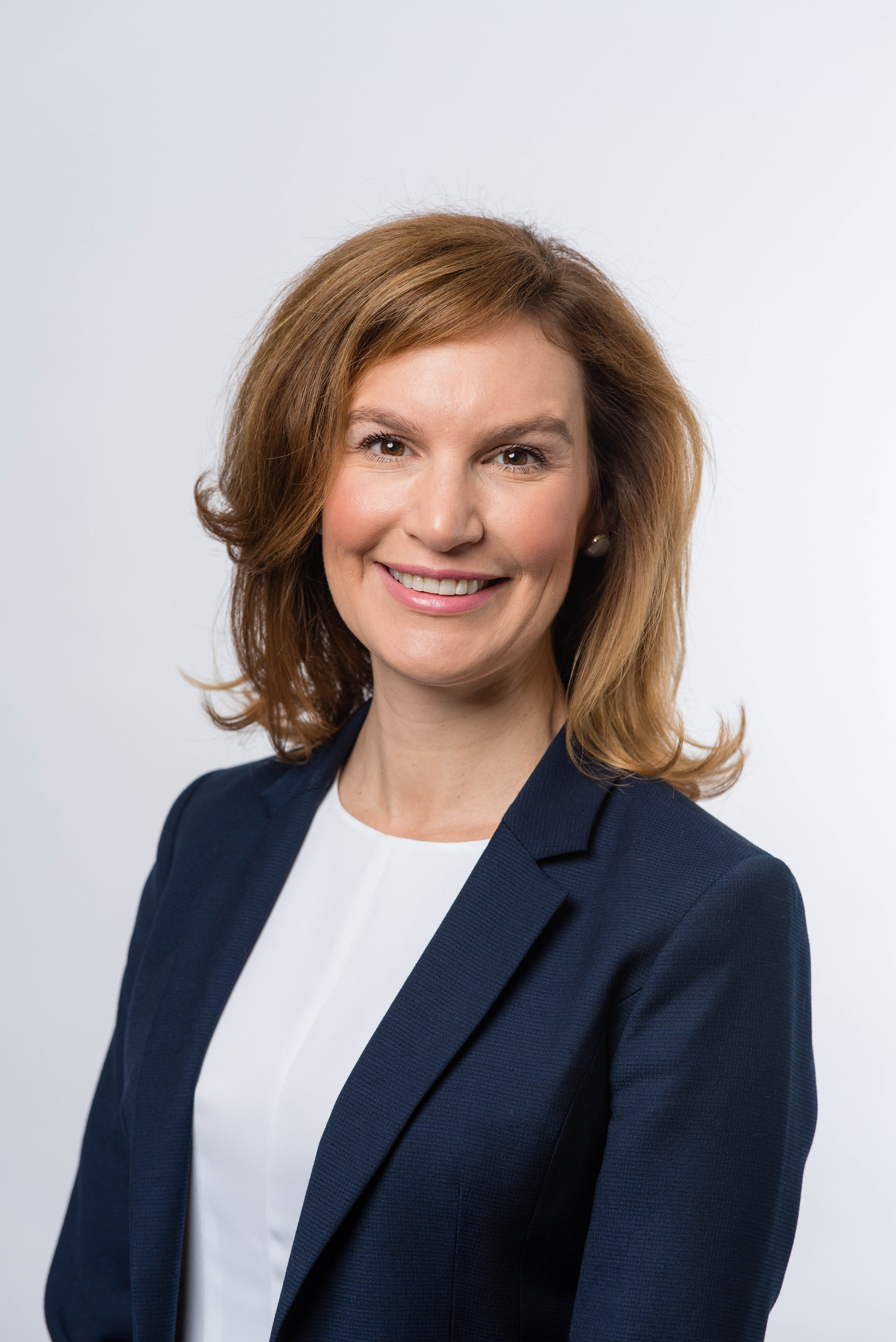

Assistant Minister Domestic and Family Violence
- In office 5 April 2018 – 19 March 2022
- Premier: Steven Marshall

Member of the South Australian House of Assembly for Elder
- In office 17 March 2018 – 2022
- Preceded by: Annabel Digance
- Succeeded by: Nadia Clancy

Personal details
- Born: Carolyn Laura Habib Alice Springs, Northern Territory, Australia
- Party: Liberal Party of Australia

Carolyn Laura Power (née Habib) is an Australian politician. She was a Liberal member of the South Australian House of Assembly from the 2018 state election until 2022, representing Elder.

Power, previously a City of Marion councillor, worked in health and human services for not-for-profit organisations before her election. She was the unsuccessful Liberal candidate for the seat at the 2014 state election. During the 2014 election campaign, the Labor Party released a flyer headlined "Can You Trust Habib?", which the Liberals described as a racist attack on her surname and Lebanese heritage.

In April 2018, a month after her election, Power was sworn in as South Australia's first Assistant Minister for Domestic and Family Violence Prevention. In her capacity as Assistant Minister for Domestic and Family Violence, Carolyn Power oversaw a raft of policy changes and the single largest investment in initiatives to tackle domestic and family violence. In 2019, Committed to Safety: a framework for addressing domestic, family and sexual violence in South Australia was released after extensive consultation with key stakeholders and those with lived experience. Key initiatives included legislative change resulting in recognising non-fatal strangulation as an offence, the state-first intervention pilot program with new perpetrator beds for South Australian men, the implementation of Australia's first state-wide Domestic Violence Disclosure Scheme and peak body funding for the first time for the Coalition of Women's Domestic and Aboriginal Family Violence Services.

As the Member for Elder, Carolyn Power was instrumental in the fight to save the Repat (formerly known as the Repatriation Hospital) alongside veterans, clinicians and community members. The Repat Health Precinct is now the first of its kind in South Australia, where several public, private and non-government organisations are collated together to provide a range of health and wellbeing services. Other key achievements as the local member for the state electorate for Elder include the $60million upgrade of the Springbank, Daws and Goodwood Road intersection; saving Springbank Secondary College whilst expanding the Unley High School zone; heritage areas safeguarded with the development of Heritage Standards for Colonel Light Gardens; evening and weekend train services on the Flinders Line for the first time; Flinders Medical Centre Emergency Department expanded and local parks upgraded in partnership with Council.

In August 2018, Carolyn Habib officially changed her surname from Habib to Power. Power was married prior to the 2018 election to her childhood sweetheart, Brad Power. Power chose to wait to change her surname to ensure there was no confusion or extra costs associated in reproducing election materials.

She lost her seat to Labor candidate Nadia Clancy in the 2022 South Australian state election.

Political offices
New title	Assistant Minister for Domestic and Family Violence; 2018–2022	Incumbent
South Australian House of Assembly
Preceded by Annabel Digance	Member for Elder; 2018–2022	Succeeded by Nadia Clancy
