= David Wade (politician) =

Australian politician

David Edward Wade (born 9 March 1950) is a former South Australian politician, who represented the Liberal Party for the Electoral district of Elder between 1993 and 1997. He was elected to the South Australian House of Assembly as the inaugural Member for Elder during the 1993 State Election and stood for one term, until defeated at the 1997 State Election by Labor's Patrick Conlon.

Parliament of South Australia
Preceded by New seat	Member for Elder; 1993–1997	Succeeded by Patrick Conlon
