= Electoral district of Mount Gambier =

South Australian state electoral district

Mount Gambier South Australia—House of Assembly
- Interactive map of electoral district boundaries from the 2014 state election (Note: The electorate had no change in boundaries at the 2018, 2022, and 2026 state elections.)
- State: South Australia
- Dates current: 1938–1993, 2002–present
- MP: Travis Fatchen
- Party: Independent
- Namesake: Mount Gambier
- Electors: 26,738 (2026)
- Area: 1,935 km^{2} (747.1 sq mi)
- Demographic: Provincial
- Coordinates: 37°48′37″S 140°38′4″E
Electorates around Mount Gambier:
MacKillop	MacKillop	Victoria
Southern Ocean	Mount Gambier	Victoria
Southern Ocean	Southern Ocean	Southern Ocean

Mount Gambier is a single-member electoral district for the South Australian House of Assembly. It covers the far south-east corner of the state containing the City of Mount Gambier and District Council of Grant local government areas. It is centred on the city and extinct volcano of Mount Gambier.

== History ==
The electorate was created in the 1936 redistribution, taking effect at the 1938 election, but the name was not used between the 1993 and 2002 elections – the area was covered by the electoral district of Gordon during that time. It was one of the few country electoral districts that had never been held by the Liberal and Country League during the Playmander era. It was held by long-serving independent John Fletcher for the first two decades of its existence. Labor took the electorate at a 1958 by-election, and it was usually a marginal to fairly safe Labor electorate from then until the Liberals won it at the 1975 election on a 15.5 percent swing. Mount Gambier was one of several rural electorates where Labor suffered large swings in that election–13.5 percent in Chaffey and 16.4 percent in Millicent. Labor has only come reasonably close to retaking the seat once since then, in 1982.

The electorate, both in its current incarnation and as Gordon, has a recent history of electing independent MPs. It was held between 2002 and 2010 by Rory McEwen, a former Liberal who won as an independent in Gordon at the 1997 election after losing a preselection battle to succeed longtime Liberal member Harold Allison. While he did not put Labor into office after the 2002 election, he held various ministerial portfolios in the Rann Labor government from nine months after the election until his retirement at the 2010 election.

McEwen was succeeded by another independent, Don Pegler, who narrowly defeated the Liberal candidate on a 0.4 percent two-candidate preferred margin. Pegler was defeated by Liberal candidate Troy Bell at the 2014 election, who also became an independent in 2017.

In the lead up to the 2018 election, a ReachTEL poll of 655 voters in the electorate was conducted on 13 February 2018, a month before the election. The results of the poll unexpectedly showed that Bell, who was running as an independent candidate, would easily retain the electorate after preferences, and was strongly leading with 36 percent of the primary vote. The Liberals were on 28.5 percent (−23.3), Labor was on 13 percent (+2.1), new SA Best was on 11 percent, others were collectively on 6 percent, with the remaining 5 percent undecided. The election results reflected the poll, and Bell was comfortably returned as the member.

On 1 September 2025, the Speaker of the House of Assembly announced that he had received Troy Bell's resignation as the Member for Mount Gambier. After consultation with the SA Electoral Commission the speaker made a determination that no by election would be held and that the seat would remain vacant until the March 2026 election.

== Members for Mount Gambier ==
First incarnation (1938–1993)
Member	Party	Term
John Fletcher	Independent	1938–1958
Ron Ralston	Labor	1958–1962
Allan Burdon	Labor	1962–1975
Harold Allison	Liberal	1975–1993
Second incarnation (2002–present)
Member	Party	Term
Rory McEwen	Independent	2002–2010
Don Pegler	Independent	2010–2014
Troy Bell	Liberal	2014–2017
Troy Bell	Independent	2017–2025
Travis Fatchen	Independent	2026–present

== Election results ==
2026 South Australian state election: Mount Gambier
Party	Candidate	Votes	%	±%
Independent	Travis Fatchen	5,979	27.1	+27.1
One Nation	Annie-Marie Loef	5,939	26.9	+26.9
Labor	Matthew Key	3,319	15.0	−5.6
Liberal	Lamorna Alexander	2,768	12.5	−16.5
Independent	Cody Scholes	1,401	6.3	+6.3
Greens	Sharon Holmes	1,050	4.8	+4.8
Independent	Kate Amoroso	930	4.2	+4.2
Legalise Cannabis	Martin Godfrey	271	1.2	+1.2
Family First	Rachael Kenyon	221	1.0	−3.7
Animal Justice	James Thomson	141	0.6	+0.6
Australian Family	Eleanor Day	85	0.4	+0.4
Total formal votes		22,104	93.0	−4.0
Informal votes		1,671	7.0	+4.0
Turnout		23,775	88.9	−0.4
Two-candidate-preferred result
Independent	Travis Fatchen	13,349	60.4	+60.4
One Nation	Annie-Marie Loef	8,755	39.6	+39.6
Independent gain from Independent				
