= Rob Atkinson (surgeon) =

Australian surgeon

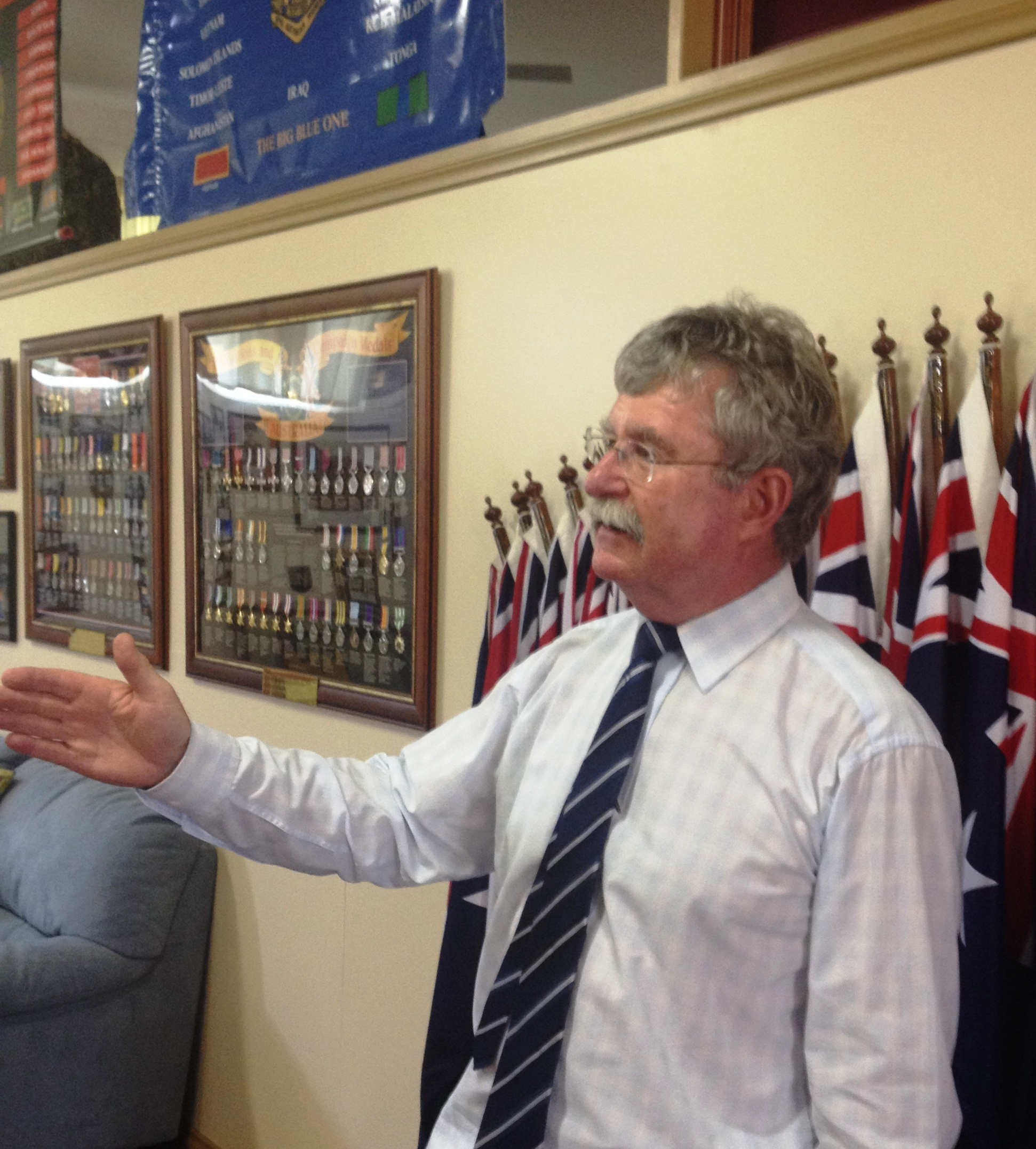
- Atkinson answering questions at a function, January 2014
- Born: 21 March 1947 (age 79)
- Military career
- Allegiance: Australia
- Branch: Australian Army
- Rank: Brigadier
- Unit: Royal Australian Army Medical Corps
- Conflicts: Vietnam War; Gulf War; Rwanda (UNAMIR); Operation Bel Isi; International Force for East Timor; Operation Astute
- Awards: Member of the Order of Australia; Reserve Force Decoration

Brigadier Robert Neville Atkinson, AM, RFD, FAMA (born 21 March 1947) is an Australian orthopaedic surgeon and retired senior officer of the Royal Australian Army Medical Corps, best known for his contributions to trauma and military surgery.

== Career ==
Atkinson graduated with a Bachelor of Medicine, Bachelor of Surgery from the University of Adelaide in 1970, completed his residency, then served with the Australian Army as a medical officer during the Vietnam War, specialising in trauma and orthopaedic surgery. He continued his career in the Australian Army Reserve, becoming Assistant Surgeon General (Army) of the Australian Defence Force (ADF). In 1998, he was promoted to brigadier. He was also Emeritus Consultant in Military Surgery for the ADF.

His military service included deployment to the Gulf War, and peacekeeping missions in Rwanda, Bougainville and East Timor. He also served in Aceh, and Samoa, following the tsunamis of 2005 and 2009.

Atkinson has served on the council of the Royal Australasian College of Surgeons, and received the E.S.R. Hughes Award for distinguished contributions to military surgery.

In 2008 Atkinson was appointed a Member of the Order of Australia (AM) "for services to medicine as an orthopaedic surgeon and through contributions to professional associations", and was admitted as a Fellow of the Australian Medical Association (FAMA) in the same year.

In 2014, Atkinson became the President of the Naval, Military and Air Force Club of South Australia. In the same year he unsuccessfully ran for a seat in the South Australian Legislative Council on the independent 'Your Voice Matters' ticket.

== Publications ==
Atkinson has contributed to published papers on medical, surgical and road safety since 1978, including:

- Atkinson, R. N.; Paterson, D. C.; Morriss, L. L.; Savage, J. P. (August 1978), "Bone Scintigraphy in discitis and related disorders in children", Australian and New Zealand Journal of Surgery, 48 (4): 374–377, doi:10.1111/j.1445-2197.1978.tb04879.x, PMID 282866
- Mah, E. T.; Atkinson, R. N. (February 1992), "Percutaneous kirschner wire stabilisation following closed reduction of colles' fractures", Journal of Hand Surgery (British and European Volume), 17 (1): 55–62, doi:10.1016/0266-7681(92)90012-q, PMID 1640146, S2CID 42039035
- Clayer, M.; Atkinson, R. (May 1994), "A method of pre-operative assessment for posterior cruciate ligament reconstruction", Australian and New Zealand Journal of Surgery, 64 (5): 319–321, doi:10.1111/j.1445-2197.1994.tb02218.x, PMID 8179526
- Mah, E. T.; Wang, W.; Atkinson R. N. (September 1996), "A new clinical sign to aid the diagnosis of locked posterior dislocation of the shoulder", Emergency Medicine, 8 (3): 129–132, doi:10.1111/j.1442-2026.1996.tb00595.x
- Pathak, G.; Atkinson R. N. (April 2001), "Military external fixation of fractures" (PDF), ADF Health, 2: 24–28
- Davey, T. M.; Pollard, C. W.; Aitken, L. M.; Fitzgerald, M.; Bellamy, N.; Cass, D.; Danne, P. D.; Griggs, W. M.; Cameron, P. A.; Atkinson, R. N.; Hamill. H.; Rao, S.; Richardson, D. B.; O'Connor, C. (November 2006), "Tackling the burden of injury in Australasia: developing a binational trauma registry", The Medical Journal of Australia, 185 (9): 512–514, doi:10.5694/j.1326-5377.2006.tb00668.x, hdl:10072/14143, PMID 17137457, S2CID 46404729
- Grossbard, G.; Atkinson, R.; Cass, D.; Woolley, J.; Corben, B.; Whear, M. (2013), "2020 Vision Zero: to share or not to share the way" (PDF), Journal of the Australasian College of Road Safety, 24 (4): 57–59

== See also ==
- Candidates of the South Australian state election, 2014
- List of Australian Army brigadiers
