= Electoral district of Elder =

South Australian state electoral district

Elder South Australia—House of Assembly
- Interactive map of electoral district boundaries from the 2022 state election (Note: The electorate will have no change in boundaries at the 2026 state election.)
- State: South Australia
- Created: 1993
- MP: Nadia Clancy
- Party: Labor
- Namesake: Sir Thomas Elder
- Electors: 26,110 (2018)
- Area: 18.3 km^{2} (7.1 sq mi)
- Demographic: Metropolitan
- Coordinates: 34°59′25″S 138°35′3″E
Electorates around Elder:
Badcoe Morphett	Unley	Unley
Badcoe Gibson	Elder	Waite
Black	Davenport	Waite

Elder is a single-member electoral district for the South Australian House of Assembly. It is named after nineteenth-century businessman and philanthropist Sir Thomas Elder. Elder is an 18.3 km^{2} suburban electorate in Adelaide's inner south, taking in the suburbs of Clapham, Clovelly Park, Colonel Light Gardens, Cumberland Park, Clarence Park, Daw Park, Hawthorn, Lower Mitcham, Melrose Park, Mitchell Park, Panorama, Pasadena, St Marys, Tonsley and Westbourne Park.

== History ==
Elder was created as a marginal Labor electorate at the 1991 electoral redistribution taking suburbs in from much of the abolished Walsh and also from the redistributed Mitchell. Elder was won by Liberal David Wade with an 8.0 percent swing at the landslide Liberal victory of the 1993 election. Wade was defeated at the 1997 election – although he experienced a smaller than average swing of −6.1 percent, he only had a margin of 3.4 percent, and was easily defeated by Labor candidate Pat Conlon. Conlon was re-elected at the 2002 election and became a senior minister in the Rann government. The redistribution prior to the 2014 election reduced Labor's margin from 3.6 percent to 2.0 percent. Conlon retired in 2014 and Elder was retained by Labor's Annabel Digance.

The 2016 redistribution ahead of the 2018 election changed Elder from a 1.8 percent Labor seat to a notional 4.3 percent Liberal seat.

== Members for Elder ==
Member	Party	Term
David Wade	Liberal	1993–1997
Patrick Conlon	Labor	1997–2014
Annabel Digance	Labor	2014–2018
Carolyn Power	Liberal	2018–2022
Nadia Clancy	Labor	2022–present

== Election results ==
2026 South Australian state election: Elder
Party	Candidate	Votes	%	±%
Labor	Nadia Clancy	12,364	50.2	+6.8
Liberal	Shawn van Groesen	4,450	18.1	−20.0
Greens	Stef Rozitis	3,569	14.5	+4.6
One Nation	Matt Mangelsdorf	3,540	14.4	+14.4
Family First	Rosanne Walston-Leo	399	1.6	−0.9
Fair Go	Linda Cheng	178	0.7	+0.7
Australian Family	Robert Lonie	139	0.6	+0.6
Total formal votes		24,639	97.1	+0.3
Informal votes		737	2.9	−0.3
Turnout		25,376	90.6	−0.1
Two-party-preferred result
Labor	Nadia Clancy	17,032	69.1	+13.5
Liberal	Shawn van Groesen	7,607	30.9	−13.5
Labor hold		Swing	+13.5	
