= Allan Burdon =

Australian politician

Allan Robert Burdon (11 December 1914 – 18 June 2001) was an Australian politician who represented the South Australian House of Assembly seat of Mount Gambier from 1962 to 1975 for the Labor Party.
