= Don Pegler =

Australian politician

Donald William Pegler is an Australian politician. He was an independent member of the South Australian House of Assembly electorate of Mount Gambier from the 2010 election to the 2014 election.

A resident of Kongorong, South Australia, Pegler was the mayor of the District Council of Grant before entering state politics. He narrowly defeated Liberal candidate and Mount Gambier Mayor Steve Perryman with a primary vote of 36 percent and a two-candidate preferred vote of 50.4 percent, succeeding retiring independent MHA Rory McEwen.

In May 2013, Pegler stated that he had changed his view on voluntary euthanasia, and after opposing a bill to legalise it in 2012, now supported such a move.

South Australian House of Assembly
Preceded by Rory McEwen	Member for Mount Gambier; 2010–2014	Succeeded by Troy Bell
