= Patrick Conlon (politician) =

Australian politician

Patrick Frederick "Pat" Conlon
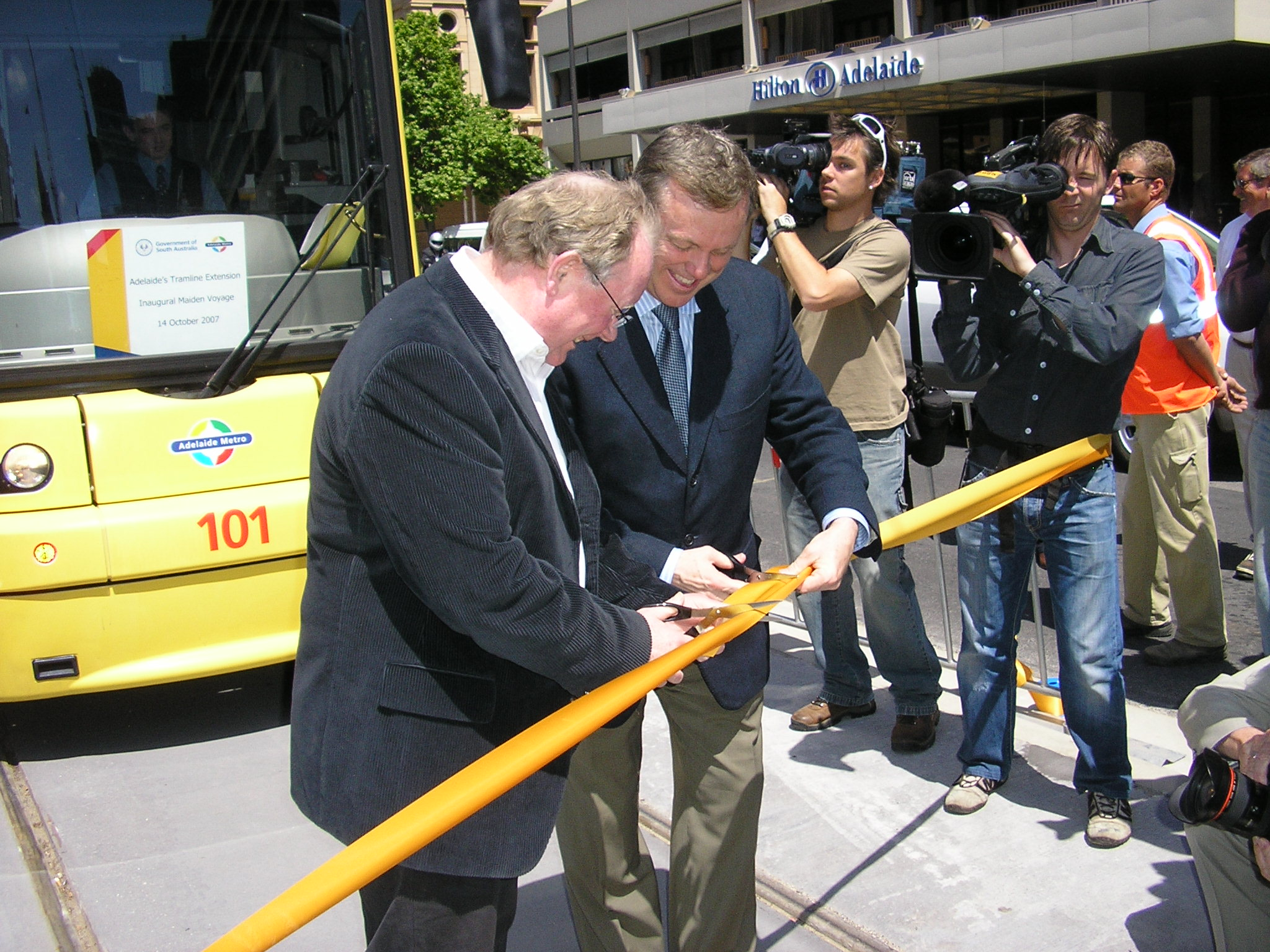
- Pat Conlon (left) and Mike Rann opening the extension of the Glenelg tram line in October 2007.

Member of the South Australian Parliament for Electoral district of Elder
- In office 11 October 1997 – 15 March 2014
- Preceded by: David Wade
- Succeeded by: Annabel Digance

Minister for Government Enterprises
- In office 6 March 2002 – 13 May 2003
- Premier: Mike Rann

Minister for Police
- In office 6 March 2002 – 13 May 2003

Minister for Emergency Services
- In office 6 March 2002 – 13 May 2003

Minister for Energy
- In office 6 March 2002 – 8 February 2011
- Premier: Mike Rann

Member of Executive Council
- In office 6 March 2002 – 21 January 2013
- Premier: Mike Rann, Jay Weatherill

Minister for Infrastructure
- In office 13 May 2003 – 21 October 2011

Minister for Transport
- In office 23 March 2005 – 21 October 2011

Minister for Industrial Relations
- In office 21 April 2011 – 23 June 2011

Minister for State / Local Government Relations
- In office 21 April 2011 – 23 June 2011

Minister for Housing and Urban Development
- In office 21 October 2011 – 21 January 2013
- Premier: Jay Weatherill

Minister for Transport and Infrastructure
- In office 21 October 2011 – 21 January 2013

Personal details
- Born: 1959 (age 66–67) Belfast, Northern Ireland
- Party: Labor Party
- Spouse: Tania
- Children: 2 daughters
- Education: University of Adelaide
- Profession: Barrister and Solicitor
- Committees: Economic and Finance Committee, Select Committee on the Emergency Services Levy, House of Assembly v Minister for Recreation, Sport & Racing - Misleading, Member for Davenport v Minister for Environment and Conservation - Misleading, Roxby Downs (Indenture Ratification) (Amendment of Indenture) Amendment Bill, Environment, Resources and Development Committee

Patrick Frederick "Pat" Conlon (born 1959) is a former South Australian politician who represented the Electoral district of Elder in the South Australian House of Assembly as a member of the Labor Party from 1997 to 2014. He was Minister for Transport, Minister for Infrastructure, and Minister for Energy, as well as the Leader of Government Business in the Lower House. Until early 2005, Conlon was also Emergency Services Minister and took part in the government's response to the Eyre Peninsula bushfire (also known as Black Tuesday) in January 2005. Conlon was the most senior Labor Left figure in the Labor cabinet until April 2010 when he became unaligned.

He was formerly an organiser for the Liquor Hospitality and Miscellaneous Workers Union.

== Early life ==
Born in Belfast, Northern Ireland, the seven-year-old Conlon was brought to South Australia by his family in 1966. They lived initially in Elizabeth before settling in Port Adelaide. Conlon was educated at LeFevre Boys Technical High School.

His early jobs included being a roof tiler, storeperson, timberhand, deckhand, and signalperson. In 1983 he became a union organiser and five years later he took part-time Arts and Law classes at the University of Adelaide, which he funded through part-time work as an office cleaner, industrial officer, project officer and workers compensation employee advocate. He graduated with an Arts degree and with first class honours in Law. He won the Howard Zelling prize for Constitutional Law, the Stow Prize, and the David Murray Scholarship for his honours dissertation on employment law.

In the early 1990s he worked at law firm Duncan Basheer with Jay Weatherill and Isobel Redmond.

== Parliament ==
Conlon was first elected to the South Australian House of Assembly as the member for the south-western Adelaide seat of Elder at the 1997 election with a 52.6 percent two-party vote from a 6.1 percent two-party swing. Conlon won a 53.7 percent two-party vote at the 2002 election. The 2006 election saw Conlon win a 64.9 percent two-party vote. The 2010 election saw Conlon win a 53.6 percent two-party vote.

Conlon served in many portfolios between 2002 and 2013 as a senior cabinet member, including Government Enterprises, Police, Emergency Services, Energy, Infrastructure, Transport, Industrial Relations, State/Local Government Relations, Housing and Urban Development, and Transport and Infrastructure.

After announcing in September 2012 his intention not to recontest his parliamentary seat at the 2014 election, Conlon announced in early March 2013 that he would immediately take up a salaried position with national law firm MinterEllison in Adelaide for the equivalent of three days per week.

== Personal life ==
Conlon and his wife Tania have two daughters; Sadie Conlon born in December 2004 and Jemima Conlon. His hobbies include supporting the Port Adelaide Football Club, fishing, fine wine, and cooking.

South Australian House of Assembly
Preceded by David Wade	Member for Elder; 1997–2014	Succeeded by Annabel Digance
