= Annabel Digance =

Australian politician

Member of the South Australian Parliament for Elder
- In office 15 March 2014 – 16 March 2018
- Preceded by: Patrick Conlon
- Succeeded by: Carolyn Habib

Personal details
- Born: 1957 or 1958 (age 68–69)
- Spouse: Gregory
- Children: 3
- Education: Booleroo Centre primary and high schools Walford; University of South Australia; Flinders University; Deakin University
- Profession: Academic and nurse

Annabel Faith Catford Digance is an Australian politician who represented the South Australian House of Assembly seat of Elder for the Labor Party from the 2014 state election until her defeat at the 2018 state election. She was an independent candidate for the South Australian Legislative Council in the 2022 South Australian state election and at the time she and her husband were awaiting trial on charges of alleged blackmail, which were later withdrawn. In 2024, Digance sued Peter Malinauskas and the Government of South Australia for malicious prosecution and misfeasance in public office. The case was dismissed.

== Before politics ==
Digance has been a healthcare professional, company director, small businessperson and university lecturer. Digance holds multiple degrees including a Masters in Health Service Management, and is a Fellow of the Australian Institute of Company Directors.

== Federal candidate ==
Digance contested the federal seat of Boothby for Labor at the 2010 and 2013 elections. She nearly won the traditionally fairly safe Liberal seat of Boothby in 2010 with a 49.25 percent two-party vote.

== South Australian parliament ==
Digance was the Labor Party candidate for the state seat of Elder in the 2014 South Australian state election. The southern half of Elder overlapped with Boothby. Digance won the two-party-preferred vote with 51.8% of the votes.

The Liberal candidate, Carolyn Habib, was targeted by a Labor Party flyer headlined "Can You Trust Habib?", which the Liberals described as a racist attack on her surname and Lebanese heritage. Seven years later, Digance apologised, saying that she did not know in advance about the flyer, and that she was also a victim.

A redistribution ahead of the 2018 state election erased Digance's majority in Elder and gave the Liberals a notional 4.3 percent majority. Digance opted to stand for re-election and was defeated by Liberal Carolyn Habib.

== After parliament ==
In 2019, Digance had been an associate professor in health administration at Flinders University, with a focus on aged care and ethics.

Annabel Digance and her husband Greg Digance were arrested on 14 April 2021 for allegedly blackmailing South Australian opposition leader, Peter Malinauskas. They were alleged to have threatened to make false accusations about Malinauskas if he did not orchestrate Digance's return to politics through a safe seat, a seat in the South Australian Legislative Council or the Australian Senate.

They appeared in the Adelaide Magistrates Court and were released on bail later the same day. The couple were refused permission to travel interstate without seeking formal permission each time. In October, a lawyer for Annabel Digance said his client would not be entering a plea and sought to have the case thrown out, saying that the case was a malicious prosecution by Malinauskas. In December, magistrate Simon Smart determined that there was a case to answer. Both Annabel and Greg Digance pleaded not guilty, and their first appearance in the District Court of South Australia was set for 11 March 2022, less than two weeks before the state election.

Annabel and Greg Digance nominated as independent candidates for the Legislative Council under the label Independent Annabel Digance. They were unsuccessful, with a total of 1359 votes, the second-lowest of twenty groups on the ballot paper.

On 11 March, both Annabel and Greg Digance pleaded not guilty to the charges and a trial date was set for May 2023, with ten days allowed to hear 23 witnesses. Following the brief court appearance, Annabel Digance read a two-page statement calling on voters to vote for her.

The charges against the Digances were withdrawn by the Director of Public Prosecutions in April 2023. In 2024, Digance brought a lawsuit in the South Australian Supreme Court against Peter Malinauskas and the Government of South Australia, claiming that the charges were malicious presecution intended to defame her. The claims against Malinauskas were dismissed in a summary judgment by Associate Justice Graham Dart, but further claims against the South Australian Police were left open for Digance to pursue further.

South Australian House of Assembly
Preceded by Patrick Conlon	Member for Elder; 2014–2018	Succeeded by Carolyn Habib
