= Tung Ngo =

Australian politician

The Honourable Tung Ngo MLC

Member of the South Australian Legislative Council
- Incumbent
- Assumed office 2014

Personal details
- Born: 1972 (age 53–54) Vietnam
- Citizenship: Australian
- Party: Australian Labor Party (SA)
- Education: University of South Australia

Tung The Ngo (Vietnamese: Tùng Ngô, pronounced [tʊwŋ͡m˨˩ ŋow˧˧]; born 1972) is an Australian politician in the South Australian Legislative Council for the South Australian Branch of the Australian Labor Party since the 2014 election. Ngo is linked with the Shop, Distributive and Allied Employees Association (SDA).

As a child, Ngo spent a year and a half in a refugee camp in the Philippines Palawan Refugee Camp before arriving in Australia as a ten year old with his older sister in 1982. He attended Adelaide High School then University of South Australia where he attained a degree in Computer and Information Science. Tung became the first Vietnamese person elected to Local Government in South Australia, he was elected to the, then City of Enfield Council in 1995. During his election campaign, Tung was targeted by white supremacists and personally criticized at their protests. Despite intimidation and threats, having witnessed divisive intolerance, as a local Councillor Tung wanted to break down barriers between all migrants and the broader community. He openly shared his culture and raised awareness of cultural differences.

He continued in the City of Port Adelaide Enfield until 2014. He is married and has three children. When elected to the South Australian Parliament in 2014, he became the first Vietnamese-born Member of Parliament in South Australia. Tung was the founder of the Vietnamese Boat People Monument unveiled in February 2021 on the Adelaide Torrens Riverbank. It is a monument commemorating the Vietnamese boat people, the events that led them to Australia, those who lost their lives, and the welcome they received from Australians.
