= Rory McEwen (politician) =

Australian politician

Rory John McEwen (born 24 September 1948) is a former Australian politician who was the independent member for the seats of Gordon (1997–2002) and Mount Gambier (2002–2010) in the South Australian House of Assembly.

Before entering politics McEwen had been a TAFE Teacher/Administrator and much experience in local government including Chair of the Grant Council, Chair of the South-East Local Government Association, and Chair of the Greater Green Triangle Regional Development Association.

At the 1997 election, when Liberal Party member for Mount Gambier Harold Allison retired, it was widely expected that McEwen would win the Liberal preselection for the seat. McEwen had also received positive write-ups by The Advertiser as an "experienced political operative." However, in a major upset, he lost to Scott Dixon, a self-employed sawmiller from Mount Gambier. McEwen ran as an independent and just nosed out the Labor candidate for second place. On the final count, a large flow of Labor preferences allowed him to sneak ahead of Dixon by 0.1 percent—a margin of just 53 votes—to win the seat. The election saw him and two other conservative independents holding the balance of power in the newly elected House of Assembly. McEwen made a formal pledge to support the Liberals on matters of confidence and supply, allowing John Olsen another term as premier.

McEwen was comfortably re-elected in the 2002 election. He was initially highly critical of former Liberal Peter Lewis's support of a Labor minority government under Mike Rann. But later, McEwen struck a deal of his own with Labor when he accepted a specially created fourteenth cabinet post in November 2002, at various times being the Minister for Local Government, Forests, Industry, Trade, Regional Development, Small Business, Agriculture, and Food and Fisheries, with a promise that he would retain a cabinet position after the 2006 election.

McEwen was involved in a media controversy leading up to the 2006 election. The following paragraph is a quote from the site pollbludgercom:

Allan Scott, millionaire trucking magnate and publisher of the Border Watch newspaper, stood down editor Frank Morello in the final week of the campaign after the Border Watch ran a number of articles seen to be critical of the Liberal Party and its candidate. The move also prompted the sudden resignation of Lechelle Earl, the writer of the articles and the paper’s chief-of-staff. Craig Bildstien of The Advertiser that "everyone The Advertiser spoke to suspects millionaire businessman Allan Scott is the chief financier" of a local Liberal campaign that has been "flush with funds", with "widespread reports that the Liberals spent $50,000 on TV advertising between October and January". The paper later reported that it had "learned that Labor candidate Brad Coates last week threatened to withdraw $6000 worth of advertising from the Border Watch because of concerns that the paper was ‘too pro-Liberal’". Earlier in the campaign, the Border Watch conducted a "straw poll" of 100 local voters – presumably conducted at the Mount Gambier Arms just before closing time – which failed to get an answer out of 51 of them. Of the remainder, 23 backed Rory McEwen against 11 for Labor and 10 for Liberal. The accompanying article drew attention to this intriguing insight from Antony Green: "There are reports the CFMEU is putting considerable effort into Labor's campaign in this seat. This would be unlikely to elect a Labor MP, but it might be enough to defeat McEwen by squeezing his primary vote, as suggested by the Advertiser's opinion poll. Given Mike Rann has promised that McEwen can stay in Cabinet if Labor is re-elected, there will be a few Labor factional leaders who realise that one way of creating a cabinet vacancy is to defeat McEwen. If there is a vigorous Labor campaign in Mount Gambier, it is more about internal Labor politics in the formation of the next cabinet than realistic hopes of Labor winning Mount Gambier".

There were fears of a voter backlash in the 2006 election due to McEwen siding with Labor, and he was presented with a strong challenge by Liberal candidate Peter Gandolfi. His primary vote dropped about 20 percent, however he finished 1.7 percent ahead of the Liberals on first preference and 6.2 percent on the two-party vote. Although Labor won a majority in its own right in this election, McEwen kept his cabinet seat as promised.

In 2007, the Liberals placed the Rann government under pressure over the non-disclosure of donations and gifts given to McEwen of which he was not required to disclose.

McEwen announced he would retire at the 2010 election, and resigned from cabinet in early 2009. It was expected the seat would revert to the Liberals, however independent candidate Don Pegler won the seat.
