= Troy Bell (politician) =

Australian politician

Member of the South Australian House of Assembly for Mount Gambier
- In office 15 March 2014 – 1 September 2025
- Preceded by: Don Pegler

Personal details
- Born: Troy Stephen Bell; 5 September 1973 (age 53) Mount Gambier, South Australia, Australia
- Party: Liberal Party of Australia (SA) (2014–2017); Independent (2017–2025)

Troy Stephen Bell (born 5 September 1973) is a former Australian politician, who was elected at the 2014 state election as the member for the South Australian House of Assembly seat of Mount Gambier, representing the South Australian Division of the Liberal Party. After being accused of misappropriating more than $2 million of public money, he became an independent in 2017.

In September 2024, following more than two days of deliberation, a South Australian District Court jury found Bell guilty of 20 counts of theft and five counts of dishonest dealings with documents. On 15 October 2024, Bell refused to resign from parliament in accordance with section 31 of the Constitution Act 1934, and vowed to appeal against the conviction. On 28 August 2025, Bell lost the appeal and formally resigned from parliament on 1 September 2025.

== Early life ==
Bell began his teaching career at the Port Augusta Secondary School. Bell then decided to move to Mount Gambier where he established the Independent Learning Centre at Mount Gambier in 2007. He held many positions within the education sector, particularly in rural areas of South Australia.

== Political career ==
Bell was elected to the South Australian House of Assembly seat of Mount Gambier at the 2014 state election for a four-year term.

In January 2016 Bell was appointed the Chair of the Liberal Party's Regional Affairs Committee.

On 17 August 2017, after being charged the week prior with 20 counts of theft and six counts of dishonestly dealing with documents, Bell quit the Liberal Party and became an independent. Resulting from investigations by the Independent Commissioner Against Corruption (ICAC), it was alleged that, between 2009 and 2013, Bell dishonestly dealt with more than $2 million of public money, and that he used documents known to be false, with the intention of claiming a benefit for himself. The complaint had been referred to ICAC following the 2014 election by Penny Richardson, the Australian Labor Party sub-branch president and deputy mayor of the City of Mount Gambier. Bell released a statement claiming he was "innocent of these allegations of theft and dishonesty and will defend them in court", and that he intended to remain in parliament.

Ahead of the 2018 election, the Liberals re-opened preselection in his seat and endorsed Craig Marsh as the Liberal candidate for Mount Gambier. Bell announced he would re-contest Mount Gambier at the election as an independent candidate.

A ReachTEL poll of 655 voters in the electorate was conducted on 13 February 2018, a month before the election, which unexpectedly found Bell, running as an independent, would easily retain his seat after preferences, and was leading the primary vote on 36 percent. The Liberals were on 28.5 percent (−23.3), Labor was on 13 percent (+2.1), SA Best was on 11 percent, others were collectively on 6 percent, with the remaining 5 percent undecided. On 17 March 2018 Troy Bell was elected as an independent member for Mount Gambier and re-elected in 2022.

== Criminal finding ==
On 26 September 2024, a jury found Bell guilty of twenty counts of theft and five counts of dishonest dealing with documents. He had been accused of stealing $430,000 from not-for-profit educational organisations. Bell confirmed on 1 October that he would appeal against the guilty verdicts.

On 28 August 2025, Bell lost his bid to have the convictions overturned, with a sentencing date to be confirmed. On 1 September 2025, the Speaker of the House of Assembly announced that he had received Bell’s resignation.

On 21 October 2025, Bell was sentenced to five years in jail after he was found guilty of 25 fraud related charges. He will serve a minimum of two years and six months.

South Australian House of Assembly
Preceded by Don Pegler	Member for Mount Gambier; 2014–2025	Succeeded by TBD
