= 2014 South Australian state election =

- 15 March 2014

All 47 seats in the House of Assembly 24 seats are needed for a majority 11 (of the 22) seats in the Legislative Council
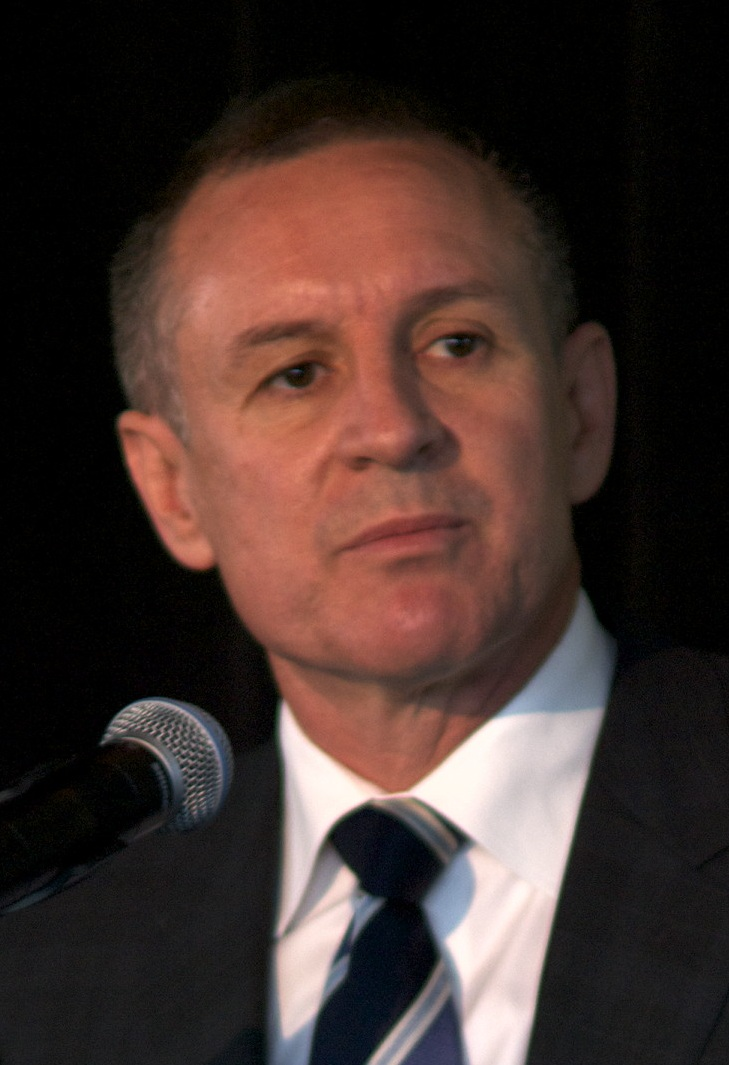

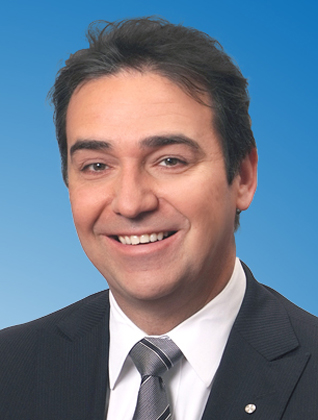
	First party	Second party
Leader	Jay Weatherill	Steven Marshall
Party	Labor	Liberal
Leader since	21 October 2011	4 February 2013
Leader's seat	Cheltenham	Dunstan
Last election	26 seats	18 seats
Seats won	23	22
Seat change	▼3	▲4
Primary vote	364,420	455,797
Percentage	35.80%	44.78%
Swing	▼1.67	▲3.13
TPP	47.0%	53.0%
TPP swing	▼1.39	▲1.39
- Winning margin by electorate.
Premier before election
Jay Weatherill
Labor
Resulting Premier
Jay Weatherill
Labor

The 2014 South Australian state election elected members to the 53rd Parliament of South Australia on 15 March 2014, to fill all 47 seats in the House of Assembly (lower house) and 11 of 22 seats in the Legislative Council (upper house). The 12-year-incumbent Australian Labor Party (SA) government, led by Premier Jay Weatherill, won its fourth consecutive four-year term in government, a record 16 years of Labor government, defeating the opposition Liberal Party of Australia (SA), led by Opposition Leader Steven Marshall.

The election resulted in a hung parliament with 23 seats for Labor and 22 for the Liberals. The balance of power rested with the two crossbench independents, Bob Such and Geoff Brock. Such did not indicate whom he would support in a minority government before he went on medical leave for a brain tumour, diagnosed one week after the election. University of Adelaide Professor and Political Commentator Clem McIntyre said the absence of Such virtually guaranteed that Brock would back Labor – with 24 seats required to govern, Brock duly provided support to the incumbent Labor government, allowing Weatherill to continue in office as head of a minority government. McIntyre said:

If Geoff Brock had gone with the Liberals, then the Parliament would have effectively been tied 23 to 23, so once Bob Such became ill and stepped away then Geoff Brock, I think had no choice but to side with Labor.

It is Labor's longest-serving South Australian government and the second longest-serving South Australian government behind the Playmander-assisted Liberal and Country League government of 1933-1965, which served first under Richard Layton Butler and then Thomas Playford IV. It is also the third time that any party has won four consecutive election victories in South Australia, after the LCL's 10 consecutive victories from 1933 to 1965 (the last eight under Playford) and Labor's four consecutive victories between 1970 and 1977 under Don Dunstan.

Recent hung parliaments occurred when Labor came to government in 2002 and prior to that when the state Liberal retained government in 1997 which saw the South Australian Division of the Liberal Party of Australia, created in 1974, win re-election for the first time.

The Liberals were reduced to 21 seats in May 2014 when Martin Hamilton-Smith became an independent and entered cabinet with Brock. Both Hamilton-Smith and Brock agreed to support the Labor government on confidence and supply while retaining the right to otherwise vote on conscience. Labor went from minority to majority government when Nat Cook won the 2014 Fisher by-election by five votes from a 7.3 percent two-party swing which was triggered by the death of Such. Despite this, the Jay Weatherill Labor government kept Brock and Hamilton-Smith in cabinet, giving the government a 26 to 21 parliamentary majority.

Like federal elections, South Australia has compulsory voting, uses full-preference instant-runoff voting in the lower house and single transferable vote group voting tickets in the proportionally represented upper house. The election was conducted by the Electoral Commission of South Australia (ECSA), an independent body answerable to Parliament.

== Results ==
Winning party by electorate.

=== House of Assembly ===
The Liberals took three seats from Labor resulting in a hung parliament with 23 seats for Labor and 22 for the Liberals. The balance of power rested with the two crossbench independents, Bob Such and Geoff Brock. Such did not indicate who he would support in a minority government before he went on medical leave for a brain tumour, diagnosed one week after the election. University of Adelaide Professor and Political Commentator Clem McIntyre said the absence of Such virtually guaranteed that Brock would back Labor – with 24 seats required to govern, Brock duly provided support to the incumbent Labor government, allowing Premier Jay Weatherill to continue in office as head of a minority government. McIntyre said:

If Geoff Brock had gone with the Liberals, then the Parliament would have effectively been tied 23 to 23, so once Bob Such became ill and stepped away then Geoff Brock, I think had no choice but to side with Labor.

In a joint press conference with Weatherill, Brock said Such's absence prompted him to make his decision a week sooner than planned. The new government was sworn in on 26 March, with Brock in cabinet as Minister for Regional Development and Local Government. The Liberals were reduced to 21 seats in May 2014 when Martin Hamilton-Smith became an independent and entered cabinet as Minister for Investment and Trade, Defence Industries and Veterans Affairs. Both Hamilton-Smith and Brock agreed to support the Labor government on confidence and supply while retaining the right to otherwise vote on conscience. Labor achieved majority government when Nat Cook won the 2014 Fisher by-election by five votes from a 7.3 percent two-party swing which was triggered by the death of Such. Despite this, the Jay Weatherill Labor government kept Brock and Hamilton-Smith in cabinet, giving the government a 26 to 21 parliamentary majority.

Party	Votes	%	+/–	Seats	+/–
Liberal	455,797	44.78	▲3.13	22	▲4
Labor	364,420	35.80	▼1.67	23	▼3
Greens	88,600	8.70	▲0.59	0	0
Family First Party	63,575	6.25	▲0.87	0	0
Independents	37,955	3.73	▼0.97	2	▼1
Dignity	5,934	0.58	▲0.45	0	0
South Australian National Party	1,328	0.13	▼0.92	0	0
FREE Australia	247	0.02	▼0.13	0	0
Total	1,017,856	100.00	–	47	–
Valid votes	1,017,856	96.91			
Invalid/blank votes	32,503	3.09	▼0.24		
Total votes	1,050,359	100.00	–		
Registered voters/turnout	1,142,419	91.94	▼0.84		
Two-party-preferred vote
Liberal	539,495	53.00	▼1.39		
Labor	478,361	47.00	▲1.39		
Total	1,017,856	100.00	–		

Popular vote
Liberal	44.78%
Labor	35.80%
Greens	8.70%
Family First	6.25%
Independents	3.73%
Others	0.74%

Two-party-preferred vote
Liberal	53.00%
Labor	47.00%

Seats
Labor	48.94%
Liberal	46.81%
Independents	4.26%

Independents: Bob Such, Geoff Brock

Although the state-wide two-party vote (2PP) was 47.0% Labor v 53.0% Liberal, the Adelaide metropolitan area containing over 75% of South Australia's population and 72% of seats (34 of 47) recorded a 2PP of 51.5% Labor v 48.5% Liberal.

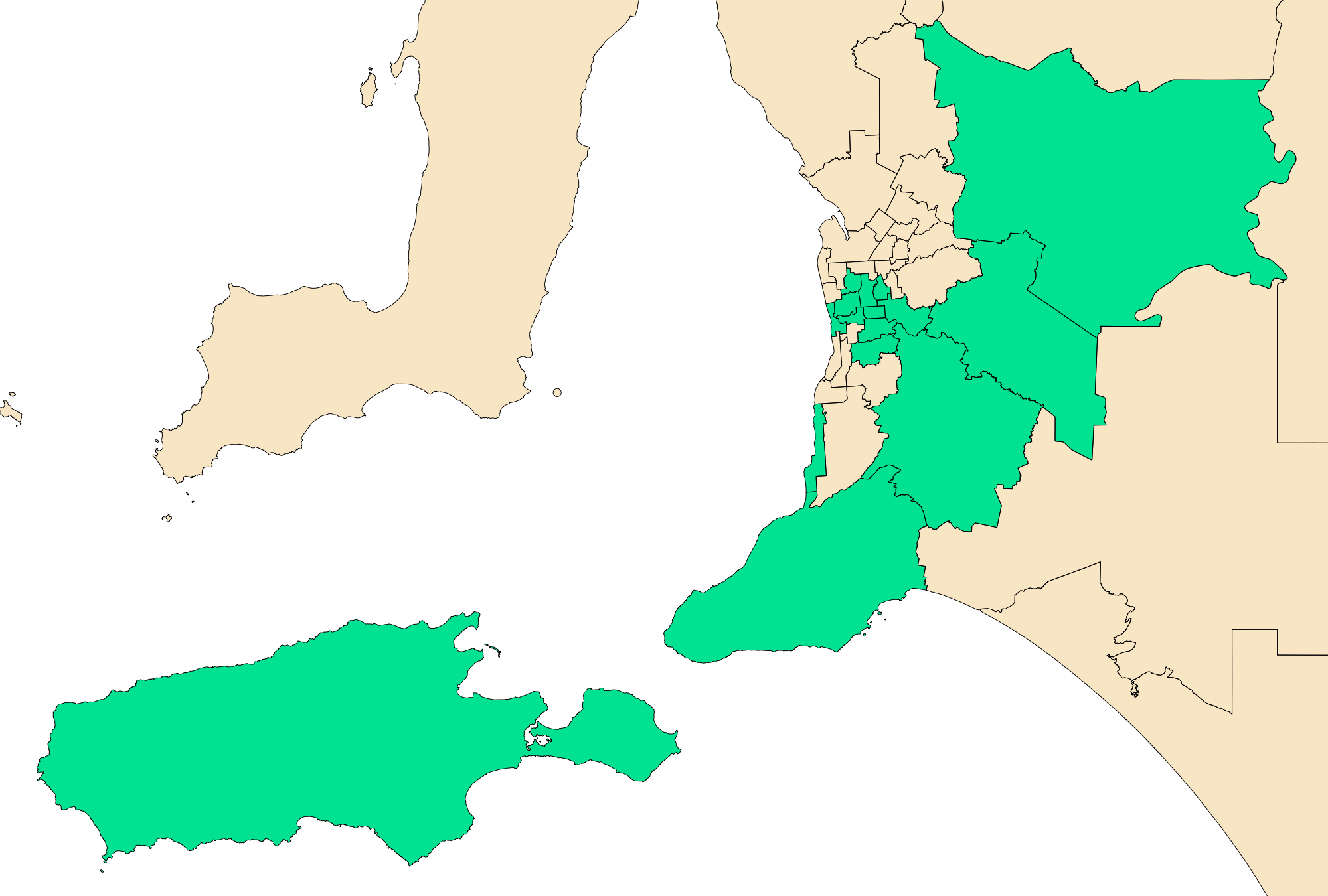
15 of 47 electorates in South Australia had a Green vote of above 10 percent at the 2014 state election. At the 2013 federal election, of 11 seats, the Green vote was above 10 percent in Adelaide, Boothby and Mayo.

==== Seat movement ====
The following seats changed hands:

Seat	Pre-2014			Swing	Post-2014		
Seat	Party	Member	Margin	Swing	Margin	Member	Party
Bright	Labor	Chloë Fox	0.5	3.7	3.3	David Speirs	Liberal
Hartley	Labor	Grace Portolesi	0.1	2.6	2.4	Vincent Tarzia	Liberal
Mitchell	Labor	Alan Sibbons	2.4	3.6	1.2	Corey Wingard	Liberal
Mount Gambier	Independent	Don Pegler	0.5	7.7	7.2	Troy Bell	Liberal

==== Pendulum ====
The following Mackerras pendulum works by lining up all of the seats according to the percentage point margin on a two candidate preferred basis based on the 2014 results. "Safe" seats require a swing of over 10 per cent to change, "fairly safe" seats require a swing of between 6 and 10 per cent, while "marginal" seats require a swing of less than 6 per cent.

Labor seats (23)
Marginal
Newland	Tom Kenyon	ALP	1.4%
Colton	Paul Caica	ALP	1.5%
Elder	Annabel Digance	ALP	1.8%
Ashford	Steph Key	ALP	1.9%
Florey	Frances Bedford	ALP	2.5%
Light	Tony Piccolo	ALP	2.8%
Wright	Jennifer Rankine	ALP	3.0%
Torrens	Dana Wortley	ALP	3.5%
Lee	Stephen Mullighan	ALP	4.5%
Mawson	Leon Bignell	ALP	5.6%
Fairly safe
Giles	Eddie Hughes	ALP	7.0%
Little Para	Lee Odenwalder	ALP	7.4%
Kaurna	Chris Picton	ALP	7.7%
Enfield	John Rau	ALP	8.1%
Napier	Jon Gee	ALP	9.1%
Reynell	Katrine Hildyard	ALP	10.0%
Safe
Port Adelaide	Susan Close	ALP	10.6%
West Torrens	Tom Koutsantonis	ALP	10.8%
Taylor	Leesa Vlahos	ALP	11.6%
Playford	Jack Snelling	ALP	12.6%
Cheltenham	Jay Weatherill	ALP	14.3%
Ramsay	Zoe Bettison	ALP	18.4%
Croydon	Michael Atkinson	ALP	18.9%

Liberal seats (22)
Marginal
Mitchell	Corey Wingard	LIB	1.2%
Adelaide	Rachel Sanderson	LIB	2.4%
Hartley	Vincent Tarzia	LIB	2.4%
Dunstan	Steven Marshall	LIB	3.1%
Bright	David Speirs	LIB	3.3%
Fairly safe
Mt Gambier	Troy Bell	LIB	7.2% v IND
Davenport	Iain Evans	LIB	8.1%
Unley	David Pisoni	LIB	9.8%
Morialta	John Gardner	LIB	10.0%
Safe
Heysen	Isobel Redmond	LIB	11.0% v GRN
Waite	Martin Hamilton-Smith	LIB	11.4%
Goyder	Steven Griffiths	LIB	12.9%
Morphett	Duncan McFetridge	LIB	12.9%
Finniss	Michael Pengilly	LIB	13.8%
Kavel	Mark Goldsworthy	LIB	14.0%
Schubert	Stephan Knoll	LIB	14.6%
Hammond	Adrian Pederick	LIB	14.6%
Bragg	Vickie Chapman	LIB	18.7%
Stuart	Dan van Holst Pellekaan	LIB	20.5%
Chaffey	Tim Whetstone	LIB	25.1%
MacKillop	Mitch Williams	LIB	26.7%
Flinders	Peter Treloar	LIB	29.2%
Independent seats (2)
Frome	Geoff Brock	IND	8.8% v LIB
Fisher	~~Bob Such~~	IND	9.4% v LIB

=== Legislative Council ===
Party	Votes	%	+/–	Seats		
Party	Votes	%	+/–	Not up	Won	Total seats
Liberal	363,809	35.99	▼3.40	4	4	8
Labor	312,944	30.96	▼6.32	3	4	7
Independent Nick Xenophon Team	130,289	12.89	New	0	1	1
Greens	65,215	6.45	▼0.17	1	1	2
Family First	44,015	4.35	▼0.06	1	1	2
Independent Palmer United	16,603	1.64	New	0	0	0
Shooters and Fishers	13,608	1.35	▲0.55	0	0	0
Dignity	9,367	0.93	▼0.25	1	0	1
Independent Animal Justice	8,787	0.87	New	0	0	0
Fishing and Lifestyle	7,999	0.79	New	0	0	0
Liberal Democrats	6,091	0.60	New	0	0	0
Independent Legal Voluntary Euthanasia	4,533	0.45	New	0	0	0
Independent Your Voice Matters	4,278	0.42	New	0	0	0
Stop Population Growth Now	3,884	0.38	New	0	0	0
Independent No Domestic Violence	2,299	0.23	New	0	0	0
FREE Australia	2,831	0.28	▼0.11	0	0	0
Independent Mark Aldridge Alliance	2,789	0.28	New	0	0	0
National	2,268	0.22	▼0.14	0	0	0
Independent Joseph Masika	1,944	0.19	New	0	0	0
Multicultural Progress	1,560	0.15	New	0	0	0
Katter's South Australian Party	1,503	0.15	New	0	0	0
Independent Environment Education Disability	1,499	0.15	New	0	0	0
Fair Land Tax - Tax Party	1,363	0.13	▼0.49	0	0	0
Independent Powerful Communities	1,341	0.13	New	0	0	0
Independent (John Browne)	112	0.01	New	0	0	0
Independent (ex ALP)				1	0	1
Total	1,010,931	100.00	–	11	11	22
Valid votes	1,010,931	96.06				
Invalid/blank votes	41,508	3.94	▼1.9			
Total votes	1,052,439	100.00	–			
Registered voters/turnout	1,142,419	92.12	▼0.8			

Members of the South Australian Legislative Council
Labor (7)	Liberal (8)	Green (2)	Family First (2) *	Xenophon Team (1)	Dignity for Disability (1)
elected 2014: Russell Wortley; Ian Hunter; Tung Ngo; Kyam Maher	elected 2014: Rob Lucas; John Dawkins; Michelle Lensink; Andrew McLachlan	elected 2014: Mark Parnell	elected 2014: Dennis Hood	elected 2014: John Darley
elected 2010: Gerry Kandelaars 1 Gail Gago; John Gazzola	elected 2010: David Ridgway; Stephen Wade; Terry Stephens; Jing Lee	elected 2010: Tammy Franks	elected 2010: Robert Brokenshire		elected 2010: Kelly Vincent
Independent (ex Labor) (1)
elected 2010: Bernard Finnigan 2

1 Appointed by casual vacancy in 2011
2 Elected from Labor ticket, became independent on 21 April 2011 following suspension from the ALP.

* On 25 April 2017, it was announced that the Family First Party would merge with the Australian Conservatives, with its two members of the South Australian Legislative Council joining the party. The Family First executive voted to dissolve the party, and in accordance with Australian law, they donated all their assets to the Australian Conservative Party.

== Date ==
The last state election was held on 20 March 2010 to elect members for the House of Assembly and half of the members in the Legislative Council. In South Australia, section 28 of the Constitution Act 1934, as amended in 2001, directs that parliaments have fixed four-year terms, and elections must be held on the third Saturday in March every four years unless this date falls the day after Good Friday, occurs within the same month as a Commonwealth election, or the conduct of the election could be adversely affected by a state disaster. Section 28 also states that the Governor may also dissolve the Assembly and call an election for an earlier date if the Government has lost the confidence of the Assembly or a bill of special importance has been rejected by the Legislative Council. Section 41 states that both the Council and the Assembly may also be dissolved simultaneously if a deadlock occurs between them.

The Electoral (Miscellaneous) Amendment Act 2013 introduced set dates for writs for General elections in South Australia. The writ sets the dates for the close of the electoral roll and the close of nominations for an election. The Electoral Act 1985 requires that, for a general election, the writ be issued 28 days before the date fixed for polling (S47(2a)) and the electoral roll be closed at 12 noon, 6 days after the issue of the writ (S48(3(a)(i). The close of nominations will be at 12 noon 3 days after the close of rolls (Electoral Act 1985 S48(4)(a) and S4(1)). Since the previous election, five new parties had registered: Fishing and Lifestyle Party, Liberal Democratic Party, Multicultural Progress Party, Stop Population Growth Now, and Katter's Australian Party. Six were no longer registered: The Democrats, Save the RAH, Gamers 4 Croydon, Democratic Labor Party, One Nation, and United Party.

Polling Day for the 2014 South Australian State election was Saturday 15 March 2014 from 8am until 6pm. The Issue of Writ for the 2014 South Australian State election was Saturday 15 February 2014. The Electoral Roll closed at 12 noon, Friday 21 February 2014. Nominations for candidates wishing to stand for election closed at 12 noon, Monday 24 February 2014, with the ballot order for both houses drawn and released shortly after, followed by close and release of upper house above-the-line preference tickets. Lower house how-to-vote card lodgements closed at 12 noon, 7 March 2014.

The 2014 Tasmanian state election occurred on the same day.

== Background ==
The centre-left Australian Labor Party, led by Premier Jay Weatherill, and the centre-right Liberal Party of Australia, led by Leader of the Opposition Steven Marshall, are the two main parties in South Australia. In the 2010 state election, of 47 seats total, the Labor Party won 26 seats and the Liberal Party won 18 seats. Three seats were won by independents, Bob Such (Fisher), Geoff Brock (Frome), and Don Pegler (Mount Gambier). Smaller parties which held no seats in the lower House but achieved significant votes in 2010 include the SA Greens and the Family First Party. In the upper house, the Labor Party held eight seats, the Liberal Party held seven seats, the SA Greens, the Family First Party, and No Pokies all held two seats each, and Dignity for Disability held one seat.

A Port Adelaide by-election and a Ramsay by-election occurred on 11 February 2012, Labor retained both seats.

== Retiring MPs ==
=== Labor ===
- Lyn Breuer MHA (Giles)
- Patrick Conlon MHA (Elder)
- Robyn Geraghty MHA (Torrens)
- John Hill MHA (Kaurna)
- Michael O'Brien MHA (Napier)
- Gay Thompson MHA (Reynell)
- Michael Wright MHA (Lee)
- Carmel Zollo MLC

=== Liberal ===
- Ivan Venning MHA (Schubert)

=== Other ===
- Ann Bressington MLC

== Redistributions and the two-party vote ==
To produce 'fair' boundaries, which has a history going back to the mid-1900s Playmander, the Electoral Commission of South Australia has been required following the 1989 election to redraw boundaries after each election through a "fairness" provision with the objective that the party which receives over 50 percent of the statewide two-party vote at the forthcoming election should win the two-party vote in a majority of seats.

Labor's success in South Australia since the end of the Playmander has been based in part on the strength of its dominance in Adelaide. South Australia is the most centralised state in Australia; while 1.7 million people live in South Australia, 1.3 million of them live in Adelaide − uniquely, over 75 percent of the state's population and 72 percent of seats (34 of 47) are located in the metropolitan area alongside a lack of comparatively-sized rural population centres. Therefore, to a far greater extent than is the case in the rest of Australia, the metropolitan area tends to decide election outcomes. Under normal conditions, Labor wins the most seats in Adelaide, with the Liberal vote locked up in ultra-safe rural seats.

In 2010, for instance, the Liberals picked up a swing of 8.4 percent, more than the uniform 6.9 percent swing that the Boundaries Commission envisaged as being enough for a Liberal win. However, most of that swing came in seats that would have stayed in Labor hands in any event; while 22 seats saw double-digit swings, Labor sat on insurmountably safe margins in 16 of them. Additionally, while the Liberals took three Adelaide-area seats off Labor, it only won six additional seats in the capital. While six of the Liberals' 13 safe two-party seats were urban, all but one of their four marginal seats were urban. As a result, while the Liberals won 51.6 percent of the two-party vote, Labor only suffered an overall three-seat swing, allowing it to hold onto a two-seat majority.

The 2014 election saw more of the same. While the state-wide two-party vote (2PP) was 47.0% Labor v 53.0% Liberal, the metropolitan area recorded a 2PP of 51.5% Labor v 48.5% Liberal. The Liberals only won 12 of the 34 metropolitan seats; while only four of their 14 safe two-party seats were urban, all eight non-safe (<10 percent) seats were urban. Overall, the election resulted in a hung parliament with 23 seats for Labor and 22 for the Liberals. The balance of power rested with the two crossbench independents, Bob Such and Geoff Brock. Their seats, Fisher and Frome, both returned clear Liberal two-party votes but elected independents. 24 seats had returned a Liberal two-party vote, 23 seats returned a Labor two-party vote, therefore the "fairness" provision was met.

One element of the Playmander remains to this day − the House of Assembly is still elected using single-member seats. Prior to the Playmander, the House of Assembly had always been elected using multi-member seats since the inaugural 1857 election.

Each Labor period of government since the end of the Playmander had at least one comprehensive win, allowing often-Liberal seats to be won by Labor candidates who then built up incumbency and personal popularity. Examples in 2014 were Mawson, Newland and Light, and additionally in 2010, Bright and Hartley – all gained at the 2006 election landslide. Mawson in fact swung toward Labor in 2010 and 2014 despite the statewide trend. The bellwether seat of Colton was retained by Labor. Furthermore, all but two of the nine Liberal-held metropolitan seats saw swings against the Liberals.

In 2014, referring to the 1989 fairness legislation, Premier Jay Weatherill said "Complaining about the rules when you designed the rules I think sits ill on the mouth of the Liberal Party", while Electoral Commissioner Kay Mousley said it was an "impossible" task for the Boundaries Commission to achieve the legislated requirement, stating "It is a constitutional requirement, and until the constitution gets changed, I must say I find it a very inexact science". Additionally, she had previously stated in 2010 "Had the Liberal Party achieved a uniform swing it would have formed Government. The Commission has no control over, and can accept no responsibility for, the quality of the candidates, policies and campaigns." University of Adelaide Professor of Politics Clem Macintyre stated after the 2014 election that fair electoral boundaries are an "impossible challenge".

The Liberal Party disagreed with that assessment, and submitted that Hartley, Elder and Bright should be moved from Labor to Liberal.

The Australian Broadcasting Corporation's election expert Antony Green expected that the Labor government's parliamentary majority from the 2010 election would be redistributed away. However, the draft redistribution, which altered the boundaries of 36 of 47 seats, nominally gave Labor 26 seats and the Liberals 21 seats on a two-party basis. Although held by an independent member, Frome was proposed to be moved from Labor to Liberal on a two-party basis. It was also proposed that the Norwood be renamed Dunstan.

The final redistribution was released in August 2012. The renaming of the seat of Norwood to Dunstan occurred. On Antony Green's calculations, the notional two-party margin in Frome went from 0.1 percent Labor to 1.7 percent Liberal, Ashford went from 4.8 percent to 0.6 percent for Labor, Hartley went from 2.3 percent to 0.1 percent for Labor, Elder went from 3.6 percent to 2.0 percent for Labor and Light went from 5.3 percent to 2.8 percent for Labor, amongst other boundary and margin reductions and increases. All redistribution figures and swings used are based on Antony Green's booth-based declaration vote calculations rather than the electoral commission's seat-based declaration vote calculations.

== Polling ==
Polling conducted by Newspoll and published in The Australian was conducted via random telephone number selection in city and country areas. Sampling sizes usually consisted of over 800 electors, while the 10–13 March 2014 poll consisted of 1602 electors. The declared margin of errors at these sample sizes were ±3.5 percent and ±2.5 percent respectively. Two-party preferred figures were calculated based on preference flows at the 2010 state election.

Primary vote opinion polling for the 2014 South Australian state election with a local regression (LOESS) trendline for each party.

Two-party-preferred opinion polling for the 2014 South Australian state election with a local regression (LOESS) trendline for each party.

House of Assembly (lower house) polling
	Primary vote					TPP vote
	Lib	Nat	ALP	Grn	Oth	Lib	ALP
15 Mar 2014 election	44.8%	0.1%	35.8%	8.7%	10.7%	53.0%	47.0%
10–13 Mar 2014	41%	<.5%	34%	9%	16%	52.3%	47.7%
21–27 Feb 2014	44%	<.5%	34%	7%	15%	54%	46%
Oct–Dec 2013	40%	<.5%	33%	10%	17%	53%	47%
Apr–Jun 2013	44%	1%	32%	10%	13%	56%	44%
Mar 2013	43%	1%	33%	10%	13%	54%	46%
Oct–Dec 2012	40%	1%	37%	9%	13%	51%	49%
Jul–Sep 2012	43%	1%	28%	11%	17%	57%	43%
Jan–Mar 2012	40%	<.5%	34%	11%	15%	52%	48%
Nov–Dec 2011	40%	2%	34%	9%	15%	52%	48%
Apr–Jun 2011	40%	1%	30%	14%	15%	54%	46%
25 Feb–6 Mar 2011	42%	1%	29%	14%	14%	56%	44%
20 Mar 2010 election	41.7%	1.0%	37.5%	8.1%	11.7%	51.6%	48.4%
14–18 Mar 2010	42.5%	< .5%	35.3%	9.3%	12.3%	52%	48%
Polling conducted by Newspoll and published in The Australian.

Better Premier and satisfaction polling^
	Better Premier		Weatherill		Marshall
	Weatherill	Marshall	Satisfied	Dissatisfied	Satisfied	Dissatisfied
15 Mar 2014 election	–	–	–	–	–	–
10–13 Mar 2014	43%	37%	42%	42%	42%	35%
21–27 Feb 2014	40%	39%	43%	44%	45%	29%
Oct–Dec 2013	40%	29%	43%	37%	43%	21%
Apr–Jun 2013	41%	30%	47%	35%	41%	20%
Mar 2013	42%	27%	46%	34%	37%	19%
Oct–Dec 2012	47%	27%^{2}	49%	32%	40%^{2}	40%^{2}
Jul–Sep 2012	40%	27%^{2}	42%	33%	40%^{2}	36%^{2}
Jan–Mar 2012	46%	23%^{2}	47%	23%	43%^{2}	34%^{2}
Nov–Dec 2011	45%	29%^{2}	51%	14%	49%^{2}	30%^{2}
Apr–Jun 2011	34%^{1}	45%^{2}	31%^{1}	59%^{1}	51%^{2}	29%^{2}
25 Feb–6 Mar 2011	32%^{1}	50%^{2}	30%^{1}	59%^{1}	52%^{2}	25%^{2}
20 Mar 2010 election	–	–	–	–	–	–
14–18 Mar 2010	43%^{1}	45%^{2}	43%^{1}	48%^{1}	59%^{2}	23%^{2}
Polling conducted by Newspoll and published in The Australian.^ Remainder were "uncommitted" to either leader.^{1} Mike Rann.^{2} Isobel Redmond.

== See also ==
- Candidates of the South Australian state election, 2014
- Members of the South Australian House of Assembly, 2014–2018
- Members of the South Australian Legislative Council, 2014–2018
- 2010 South Australian state election
- 2018 South Australian state election
