= Electoral results for the district of Hammond =

South Australian district election results

This is a list of electoral results for the Electoral district of Hammond in South Australian state elections.

== Members for Hammond ==
| Member | Party | Term |
|---|---|---|
| Peter Lewis | Liberal | 1997–2000 |
| Peter Lewis | Independent | 2000–2006 |
| Adrian Pederick | Liberal | 2006–2026 |
| Robert Roylance | One Nation | 2026–present |

== Election results ==
=== Elections in the 2020s ===
==== 2026 ====
2026 South Australian state election: Hammond
| Party | Candidate | Votes | % | ±% |
|---|---|---|---|---|
| One Nation | Robert Roylance | 6,440 | 27.4 | +20.5 |
| Labor | Simone Bailey | 6,355 | 27.0 | +3.8 |
| Liberal | Adrian Pederick | 5,244 | 22.3 | −18.2 |
| Independent | Airlie Keen | 2,294 | 9.7 | −6.0 |
| Greens | Nicole Palachicky | 1,166 | 5.0 | −1.2 |
| Legalise Cannabis | James Murphy | 780 | 3.3 | +3.3 |
| Family First | Robert North | 422 | 1.8 | −2.5 |
| Animal Justice | Ruby Eckermann | 356 | 1.5 | +1.5 |
| Independent | Lucas Hope | 229 | 1.0 | +1.0 |
| Australian Family | Bruce Hicks | 114 | 0.5 | +0.5 |
| United Voice | Carmelo Graziano | 88 | 0.4 | +0.4 |
| Fair Go | Tristan Iveson | 34 | 0.1 | +0.1 |
| Total formal votes | | 23,523 | 92.3 | −3.5 |
| Informal votes | | 1,961 | 7.7 | +3.5 |
| Turnout | | 25,484 | 87.4 | −0.4 |
Two-candidate-preferred result
| One Nation | Robert Roylance | 12,913 | 54.9 | +54.9 |
| Labor | Simone Bailey | 10,609 | 45.1 | +0.2 |
| One Nation gain from Liberal | | | | |

==== 2022 ====
2022 South Australian state election: Hammond
| Party | Candidate | Votes | % | ±% |
|---|---|---|---|---|
| Liberal | Adrian Pederick | 9,130 | 40.5 | −9.0 |
| Labor | Belinda Owens | 5,244 | 23.3 | +6.2 |
| Independent | Airlie Keen | 3,550 | 15.7 | +15.7 |
| One Nation | Tonya Scott | 1,548 | 6.9 | +6.9 |
| Greens | Timothy White | 1,377 | 6.1 | +0.5 |
| Family First | Cameron Lock | 979 | 4.3 | +4.3 |
| National | John Illingworth | 720 | 3.2 | +3.2 |
| Total formal votes | | 22,548 | 95.8 | |
| Informal votes | | 985 | 4.2 | |
| Turnout | | 23,533 | 87.8 | |
Two-party-preferred result
| Liberal | Adrian Pederick | 12,431 | 55.1 | −11.7 |
| Labor | Belinda Owens | 10,117 | 44.9 | +11.7 |
| Liberal hold | | Swing | −11.7 | |

Distribution of preferences: Hammond
| Party | Candidate | Votes | Round 1 | | Round 2 | | Round 3 | | Round 4 | | Round 5 | |
| Party | Candidate | Votes | Dist. | Total | Dist. | Total | Dist. | Total | Dist. | Total | Dist. | Total |
|---|---|---|---|---|---|---|---|---|---|---|---|---|
| Quota (50% + 1) | | 11,275 | | | | | | | | | | |
| Liberal | Adrian Pederick | 9,130 | +169 | 9,299 | +388 | 9,687 | +184 | 9,871 | +415 | 10,286 | +2,145 | 12,431 |
| Labor | Belinda Owens | 5,244 | +92 | 5,336 | +135 | 5,471 | +525 | 5,996 | +288 | 6,284 | +3,833 | 10,117 |
| Independent | Airlie Keen | 3,550 | +279 | 3,829 | +173 | 4,002 | +535 | 4,537 | +1,441 | 5,978 | Excluded | |
| One Nation | Tonya Scott | 1,548 | +74 | 1,622 | +210 | 1,832 | +312 | 2,144 | Excluded | | | |
| Greens | Timothy White | 1,377 | +49 | 1,426 | +130 | 1,556 | Excluded | | | | | |
| Family First | Cameron Lock | 979 | +57 | 1,036 | Excluded | | | | | | | |
| National | John Illingworth | 720 | Excluded | | | | | | | | | |

=== Elections in the 2010s ===
==== 2018 ====
2018 South Australian state election: Hammond
| Party | Candidate | Votes | % | ±% |
|---|---|---|---|---|
| Liberal | Adrian Pederick | 11,475 | 52.0 | −5.1 |
| SA-Best | Kelly Gladigau | 5,010 | 22.7 | +22.7 |
| Labor | Mat O'Brien | 3,560 | 16.1 | −7.7 |
| Greens | Simon Hope | 1,062 | 4.8 | −1.3 |
| Conservatives | Declan Paton | 954 | 4.3 | −4.6 |
| Total formal votes | | 22,061 | 96.3 | −0.5 |
| Informal votes | | 843 | 3.7 | +0.5 |
| Turnout | | 22,904 | 91.5 | +5.6 |
Two-party-preferred result
| Liberal | Adrian Pederick | 15,325 | 69.5 | +2.7 |
| Labor | Mat O'Brien | 6,736 | 30.5 | −2.7 |
Two-candidate-preferred result
| Liberal | Adrian Pederick | 13,697 | 62.1 | −4.7 |
| SA-Best | Kelly Gladigau | 8,364 | 37.9 | +37.9 |
| Liberal hold | | | | |

2014 South Australian state election: Hammond
| Party | Candidate | Votes | % | ±% |
|---|---|---|---|---|
| Liberal | Adrian Pederick | 11,469 | 55.1 | −5.0 |
| Labor | Lou Bailey | 5,314 | 25.5 | +1.2 |
| Family First | Daniel Gutteridge | 1,654 | 7.9 | +0.6 |
| Greens | Damien Pyne | 1,458 | 7.0 | −1.4 |
| National | Rachel Titley | 912 | 4.4 | +4.4 |
| Total formal votes | | 20,807 | 96.8 | +0.0 |
| Informal votes | | 697 | 3.2 | −0.0 |
| Turnout | | 21,504 | 92.1 | −0.7 |
Two-party-preferred result
| Liberal | Adrian Pederick | 13,444 | 64.6 | −3.1 |
| Labor | Lou Bailey | 7,363 | 35.4 | +3.1 |
| Liberal hold | | Swing | −3.1 | |

2010 South Australian state election: Hammond
| Party | Candidate | Votes | % | ±% |
|---|---|---|---|---|
| Liberal | Adrian Pederick | 13,340 | 61.8 | +16.1 |
| Labor | Hannah MacLeod | 4,973 | 23.0 | −4.7 |
| Greens | Mark Byrne | 1,735 | 8.0 | +1.6 |
| Family First | Joanne Fosdike | 1,536 | 7.1 | −1.4 |
| Total formal votes | | 21,584 | 96.4 | |
| Informal votes | | 731 | 3.6 | |
| Turnout | | 22,315 | 92.8 | |
Two-party-preferred result
| Liberal | Adrian Pederick | 14,890 | 69.0 | +8.1 |
| Labor | Hannah McLeod | 6,694 | 31.0 | −8.1 |
| Liberal hold | | Swing | +8.1 | |

=== Elections in the 2000s ===
2006 South Australian state election: Hammond
| Party | Candidate | Votes | % | ±% |
|---|---|---|---|---|
| Liberal | Adrian Pederick | 10,039 | 49.0 | +7.8 |
| Labor | James Peikert | 5,500 | 26.8 | +9.6 |
| Family First | Peter Duff | 1,907 | 9.3 | +9.3 |
| Greens | Matt Rigney | 1,476 | 7.2 | +7.2 |
| One Nation | David Kleinig | 845 | 4.1 | +0.0 |
| Democrats | Andrew Castrique | 739 | 3.6 | −2.0 |
| Total formal votes | | 20,776 | 96.0 | −1.6 |
| Informal votes | | 863 | 4.0 | +1.6 |
| Turnout | | 21,369 | 93.3 | −1.3 |
Two-party-preferred result
| Liberal | Adrian Pederick | 12,716 | 62.0 | +14.1 |
| Labor | James Peikert | 7,790 | 38.0 | +4.2 |
| Liberal gain from Independent | | Swing | N/A | |

2002 South Australian state election: Hammond
| Party | Candidate | Votes | % | ±% |
|---|---|---|---|---|
| Liberal | Barry Featherston | 8,072 | 41.2 | −10.0 |
| Independent | Peter Lewis | 6,233 | 31.8 | +31.8 |
| Labor | Harold McLaren | 3,368 | 17.2 | −3.3 |
| Democrats | Keith Webster | 1,104 | 5.6 | −12.3 |
| One Nation | Judy Arnold | 811 | 4.1 | +4.1 |
| Total formal votes | | 19,588 | 97.6 | |
| Informal votes | | 482 | 2.4 | |
| Turnout | | 20,070 | 94.6 | |
Two-candidate-preferred result
| Independent | Peter Lewis | 10,205 | 52.1 | +52.1 |
| Liberal | Barry Featherston | 9,383 | 47.9 | −16.7 |
| Independent gain from Liberal | | Swing | N/A | |

=== Elections in the 1990s ===
1997 South Australian state election: Hammond
| Party | Candidate | Votes | % | ±% |
|---|---|---|---|---|
| Liberal | Peter Lewis | 9,677 | 51.4 | −18.8 |
| Labor | Michael Young | 3,820 | 20.3 | +1.1 |
| Democrats | Brian Haddy | 3,405 | 18.1 | +8.0 |
| United Australia | Keith Steinborner | 1,928 | 10.2 | +10.2 |
| Total formal votes | | 18,830 | 96.4 | −1.0 |
| Informal votes | | 703 | 3.6 | +1.0 |
| Turnout | | 19,533 | 92.9 | |
Two-party-preferred result
| Liberal | Peter Lewis | 12,192 | 64.7 | −10.4 |
| Labor | Michael Young | 6,638 | 35.3 | +10.4 |
| Liberal hold | | Swing | −10.4 | |
