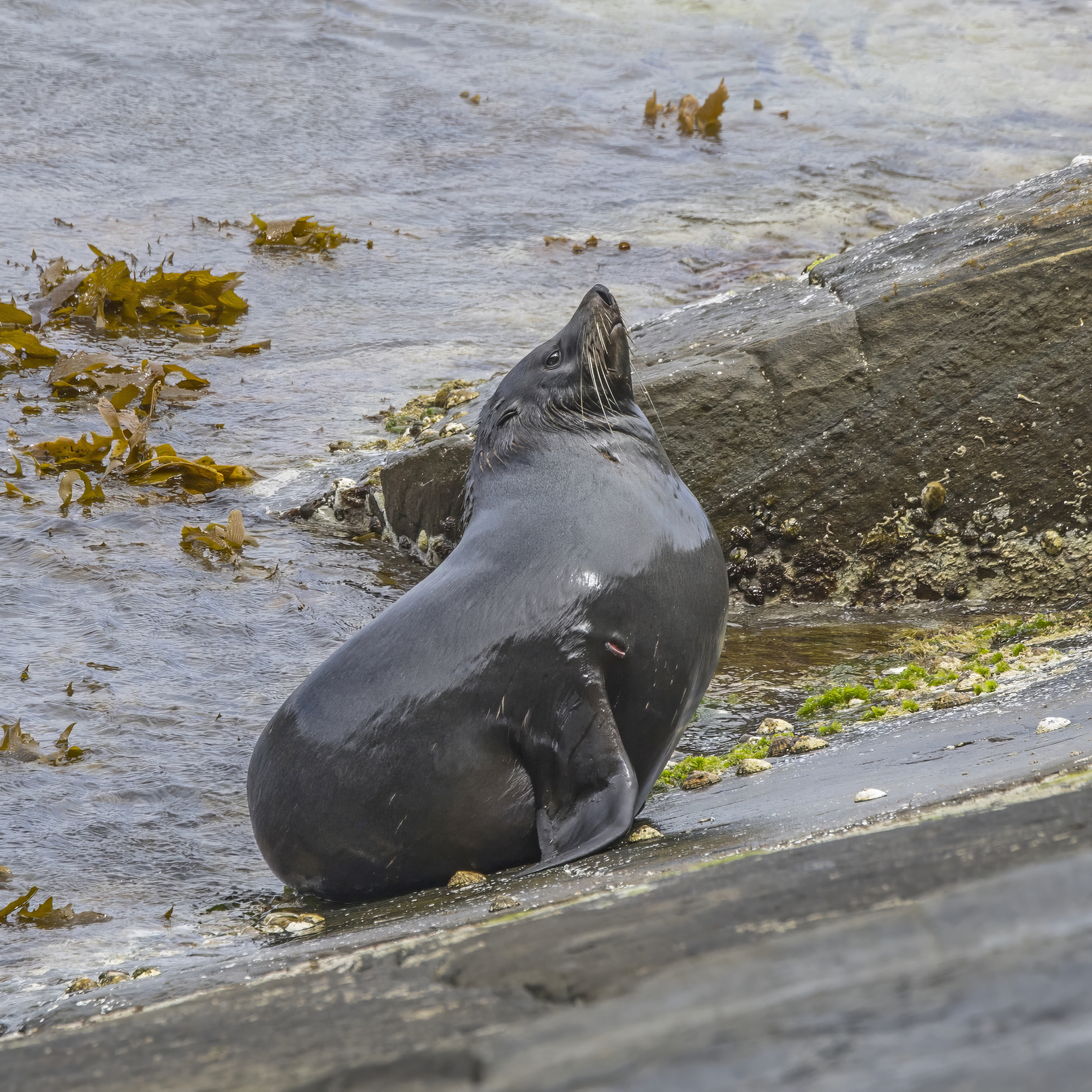
- Male

Conservation status
- Least Concern (IUCN 3.1)
- CITES Appendix II

Scientific classification
- Kingdom: Animalia
- Phylum: Chordata
- Class: Mammalia
- Order: Carnivora
- Parvorder: Pinnipedia
- Family: Otariidae
- Genus: Arctocephalus
- Species: A. forsteri

Binomial name
- Arctocephalus forsteri Lesson, 1828
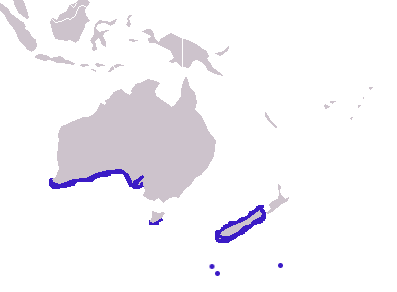
- Distribution of the New Zealand fur seal

= Arctocephalus forsteri =

Species of carnivore

Arctocephalus forsteri (common names include the Australasian fur seal, South Australian fur seal, New Zealand fur seal, Antipodean fur seal, or long-nosed fur seal) is a species of fur seal found mainly around southern Australia and New Zealand. The name New Zealand fur seal is used by English speakers in New Zealand; kekeno is used in the Māori language. As of 2014, the common name long-nosed fur seal has been proposed for the population of seals inhabiting Australia.

Although the Australian and New Zealand populations show some genetic differences, their morphologies are very similar, and thus they remain classed as a single species. After the arrival of humans in New Zealand, and particularly after the arrival of Europeans in Australia and New Zealand, hunting reduced the population to near-extinction.

== Description ==
Males have been reported as large as 160 kg (350 lb); their average weight is about 126 kg (278 lb). Males can be 2 m (6 ft 7 in) long. Females are between 30 and 50 kg (66–110 lbs) on average, and can be as long as 1.5 m (4 ft 11 in). Newborn pups are 3.3–3.9 kg (7.3–8.6 lbs) on average, and between 40 and 55 cm (1.3–1.8 ft) long. At 290 days old males are about 14.1 kg (31 lb), and females are about 12.6 kg (28 lb). Like other otariids, they have external ears and hind flippers that rotate forward, which visibly distinguish them from true seals. They have a pointed nose with long pale whiskers. Fur seals are covered by two layers of fur. The coat is grey-brown on their back, and lighter on their belly. Some have white tips on longer upper hairs, which can give them a silvery appearance.

So called "Upland Seals" once found on Antipodes Islands and Macquarie Island have been claimed as a distinct subspecies with thicker furs by scientists, although it is unclear whether these seals were genetically distinct.

== Distribution ==
The species occurs in Australia and New Zealand. It is found in the coastal waters and on the offshore islands of southern Australia, from the south-west corner of Western Australia to just east of Kangaroo Island in South Australia, and also in southern Tasmania and the subantarctic Macquarie Island. Small populations are forming in Bass Strait and coastal waters of Victoria and New South Wales as far as the mid-north coast. Before the arrival of humans in New Zealand, the species bred around all the New Zealand mainland and its subantarctic islands. There are now established and expanding colonies around the entire South Island, on Stewart Island and all of the New Zealand subantarctic islands. There are also newly established breeding colonies on the North Island.

== Behaviour ==
=== Diving ===
The species can "porpoise" out of the water when travelling quickly at sea. They can dive deeper and longer than any other fur seal. Females can dive for about 9 minutes and to a depth of about 312 metres (1,024 ft), and can dive deeper and longer in autumn and winter. Males can dive for about 15 minutes to a depth of about 380 metres (1,250 ft). On average, the species typically only dives for 1–2 minutes. When they dive for food they dive deeper during the day but shallower at night, because during the day their prey typically migrates to deeper depths and migrates back up during the night (diel vertical migration).

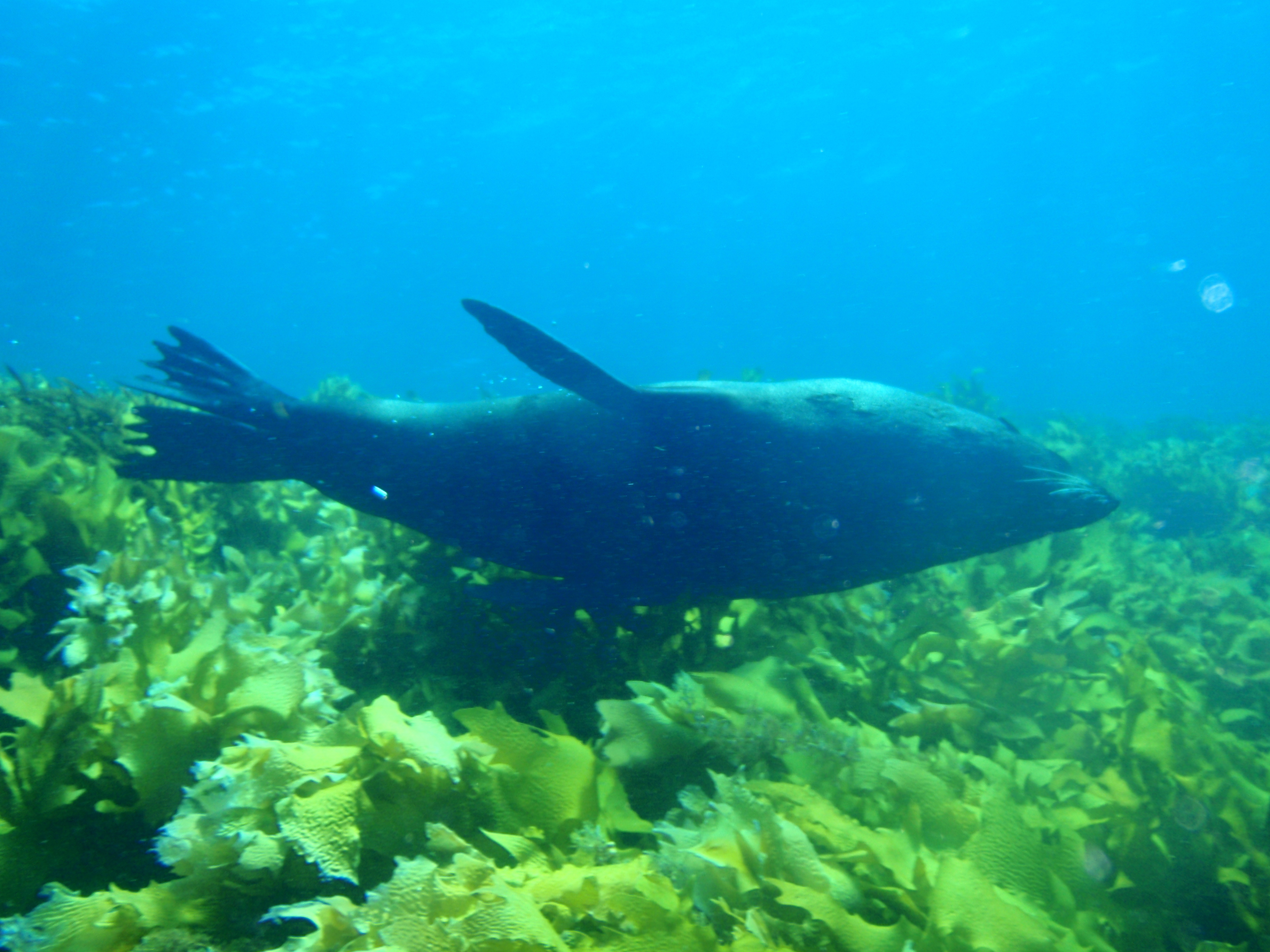
Diving at Investigator Island, Western Australia

Lactating females alter their dive patterns in order to regularly care for their young. Dives are shorter, from around 9 minutes down to 5 minutes. Several longer trips may be taken at first to find patches of prey. The shorter dives then utilise these patches. Due to the differences in diving pattern between males and females, there is very little inter-sexual competition for food sources. Males typically forage over continental shelf breaks in deeper water, while females typically utilise the continental shelf as foraging grounds. It is believed that differences in diving abilities and depths could be the cause of some sexual dimorphism between males and females.

Diving behaviour by the pups begins in the months leading up to weaning, when the pups are nursing less. The pups begin to dive from the age of 6–10 months, yet weaning is known to occur between the ages of 8 and 11 months, so the young pups do not have much time to learn to forage. The pups need to progressively develop nocturnal diving skills while they still have their mothers' milk to fall back on if dives are unsuccessful. Age, physiological development, and experience are important factors for success in hunting and contribute to the development of the pups' diving ability and behaviour. This transitional period, when young pups are becoming nutritionally independent while their foraging efficiency is rather low, is a time of high risk, and mortality can be very high. Based on scat samples, it has been found that the pups start by eating cephalopods and eventually making their way to fish, but this may just be a result of prey availability during different times of the year.

=== Communication ===
Males vocalise through a bark or whimper, either a guttural threat, a low-intensity threat, a full threat, or a submissive call. Females growl and also have a high-pitched pup attraction wail call. Pup-attraction calls allow communication from longer distances. Once together, females use olfactory recognition to confirm the pup as their own. In males, the full neck display is a non-combative posture that functions as a threat to surrounding males by which they are able to assess each other's dominance status.

=== Reproduction ===
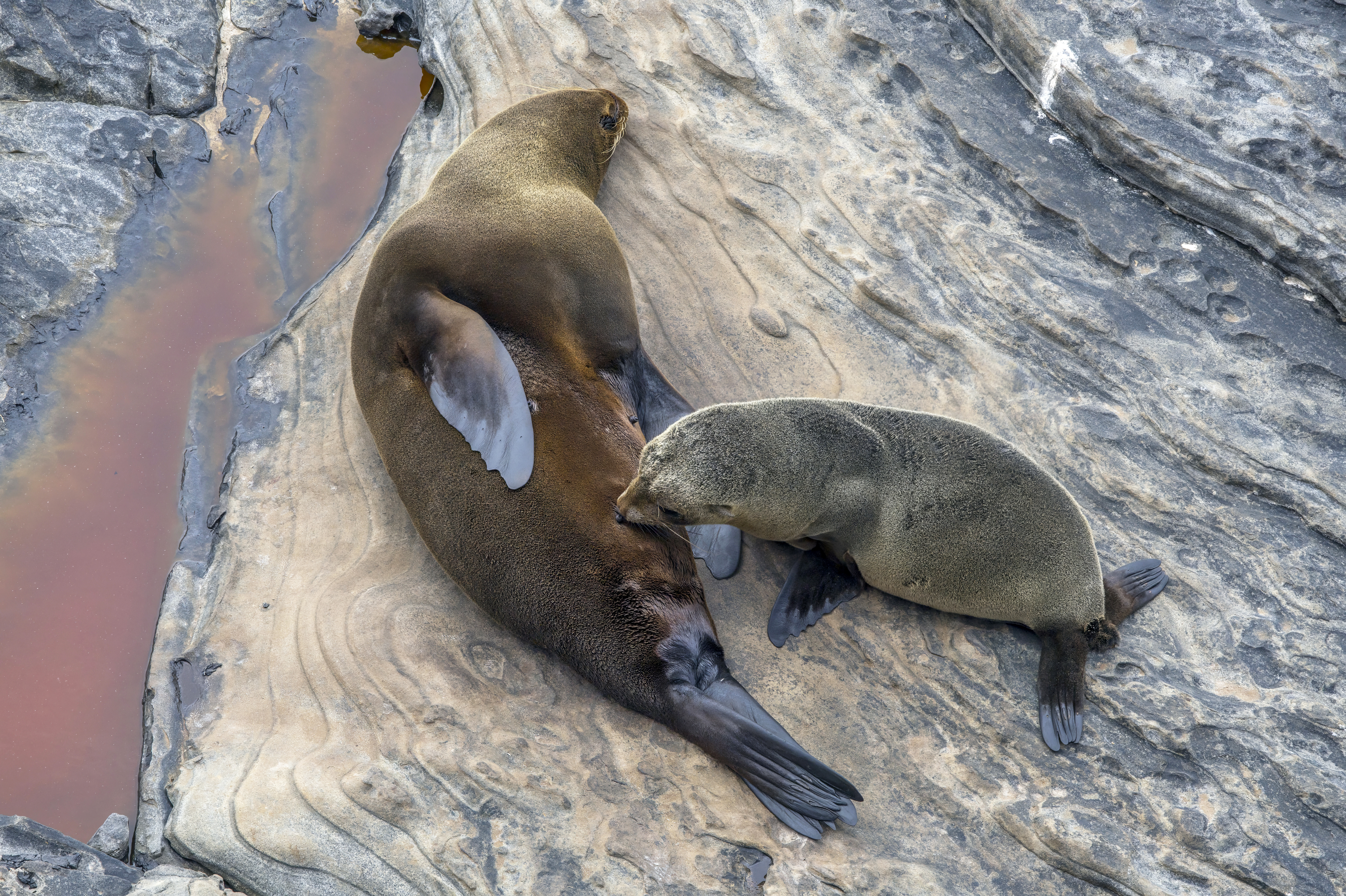
Female with suckling pup Kangaroo Island, South Australia

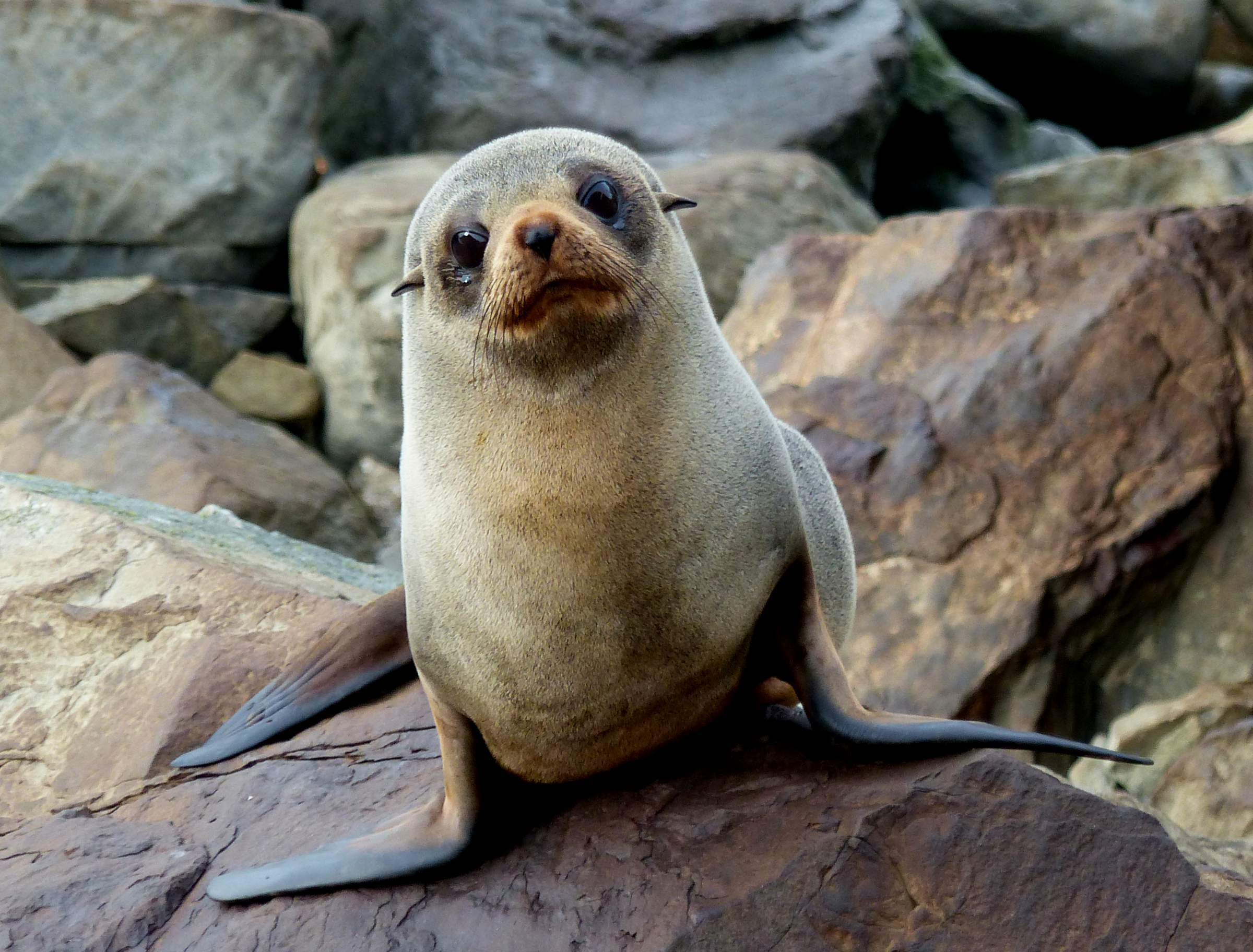
Pup near Kaikōura, New Zealand

Females mature between 4 and 6 years old, and males mature between 8 and 10 years old. These seals are polygynous. Males obtain and guard territory in late October before females arrive. Often females mate only once a year, and this usually occurs eight days postpartum for about 13 minutes on average. Females have a delayed implantation of the fertilised egg, so that implantation on the uterine wall does not occur for 3 months. Gestation occurs for 9 months Females are more aggressive near the time of birth, and do not like to be approached right after birth. Females will continue to reproduce until their death which is on average between 14 and 17 years of age.

Females first arrive on the shore between November and January, just a few days before giving birth, and stay close to the birth site for up to ten days. When they are close to labour they become very restless and irritable. When beginning labour, which can last as much as five hours, they lie down and toss their head in the air, straining forward on their fore flippers, lifting their hind quarters, or moving laterally, before slowly lowering their head down, a process they repeat until they finally give birth. In one study, observations of the actual birth, starting from when the pup was first seen, found an average of 2 minutes for a head-first delivery, but an average of 6.5 minutes if the pup came out tail first. Immediately after birth the mother begins frequently sniffing the newborn pup to better identify when she has to find it after a trip out to sea. Pups are fairly mature at birth, and within 60 minutes they start suckling for about 7 minutes. Eventually the suckling can exceed 33 minutes.

The mothers may take from 45 minutes to 3 days before leaving the pups to swim, and 6–12 days to go on longer feeding trips. Even then, the mothers tend to not leave the pups for longer than 2 days. When the pups are about 21 days old they have been seen to congregate into little pods while their mothers are away. When the females return they only feed their own pups, and have been seen to be hostile toward pups that are not their own.

Female seals have been documented to have a gradual increase in trips for feeding throughout lactation. It has been found that mothers who have sons made longer foraging trips then the mothers who had daughters during the lactation period. When observing growth patterns in the male and female pups within two cohorts, it is recognised that the growth patterns are similar, however the males grow faster and are weaned off nursing heavier in some years. Suckling can occur for about 300 days. Pups start to eat solid food just before weaning, and are eventually weaned around September, when they disperse.

Pup mortality has been attributed to both natural factors and human interaction. The biggest natural cause of death for pups is starvation, followed by suffocation in the amnion, stillbirth, trampling, drowning, and predation. Human factors include the handling of pups, tagging, and human presence in general.

== Diet ==
Their diet includes cephalopods, fish, and birds. In New Zealand, New Zealand octopus and arrow squid make up most of their cephalopod diet; other cephalopod prey include broad squid, warty squid, and Antarctic flying squid. Individuals located near their southern range limit have been known to eat penguins (like the eastern rockhopper) as part of their diet. Stomach contents have been analysed and shown to include Australian anchovy, barracouta, Paralichthyes and Rhombosolea flounders, broadgilled hagfish, pouched lamprey, red cod, school shark, and many other species. Further analysis of otoliths from their scat show that for fish prey species, lanternfishes (such as Electrona, Gymnoscopelus, Lampanyctodes, and Symbolophorus) composed the majority of their fish diet, followed by Australian anchovies, ahuru, and hoki. There are different factors that affect their diet, such as season, sex, breeding, surrounding colony, oceanography, and climatic patterns.

== Threats ==
Known predators are killer whales, sharks, male New Zealand sea lions, and possibly leopard seals. New Zealand sea lions are also known to target pups as their prey. Several regurgitations by sea lions have been found to contain remains of fur seal pups, some with plastic tags previously attached to female fur seal pups.

On 23 August 2026, the H5N1 virus, part of an outbreak affecting Australia in the second half of 2026 was detected in a long-nosed fur seal found at Beachport, South Australia. This was the first confirmed case detected in a mammal, leading to fears that the virus may spread to Australian sea lions.

== Human impact ==
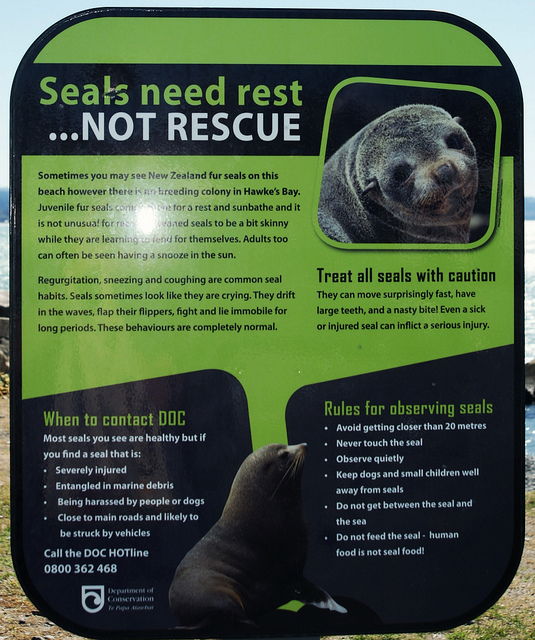
Public notice, Napier, New Zealand

Before the arrival of humans, the seals bred around all of New Zealand. Hunting by the first New Zealand settlers, the Māori, reduced their range. Commercial hunting from shortly after the European discovery of New Zealand in the 18th century until the late 19th century reduced the population to near extinction.

Today, commercial fisheries are one of the main causes of death in New Zealand fur seals, usually by entanglement and drowning. Monitoring of these pinnipeds in the Kaikōura region found that entanglements with green trawl nets and plastic strapping tape were the most common. A little less than half of the individuals were successfully released with good chances of survival even after significant entanglement wounds. It has been estimated by the Royal Forest and Bird Protection Society that over 10,000 seals could have drowned in nets between 1989 and 1998. They are also known to have been shot by commercial and recreational fishermen, because they are assumed to interfere with fishing gear. How often these shootings occur is unknown, but pressure groups have stated that the conflict between the seals and commercial fisheries is expected to increase. On 21 August 2014, two decomposing animals were found beheaded near Louth Bay in South Australia. The circumstances of their deaths were considered suspicious and an investigation followed their discovery. In 2015, several conservative members of Parliament encouraged public debate around the potential implementation of seal culling in South Australia in response to increasing interactions with South Australian commercial fisheries. As of July 2015, the killing of long-nosed fur seals remains an illegal act.

Human activity near seal rookeries has been correlated with distress and panic, resulting in indirect deaths of pups. The use of metal cattle ear tags on pups has also been associated with a decrease in pup fitness due to incomplete healing of the tag site.

=== Legislative protection ===
==== Australia ====
In Australian Commonwealth waters, Arctocephalus forsteri is protected under the Environment Protection Biodiversity Conservation (EPBC) Act 1999, under which it is listed as a protected marine species. The species is also protected within the jurisdictions of the following Australian states:

State	Listed as	Legislation
New South Wales	Vulnerable	Threatened Species Conservation Act 1995 (NSW)
South Australia	Marine mammal	National Parks and Wildlife Act 1972 (SA)
Tasmania	Rare	Threatened Species Protection Act 1995 (TAS)
Victoria	Protected	Wildlife Act 1975 (Vic)
Western Australia	Other protected fauna	Wildlife Conservation Act 1950 (WA)

The species received protection by the creation of the 16 million hectare Macquarie Island Marine Park, located on the eastern side of Macquarie island. In 2000, the Tasmanian government extended the Macquarie Island Nature Reserve by 3 nautical miles surrounding the island.

==== New Zealand ====
In New Zealand, the species is protected by the Marine Mammals Protection Act 1978, which works to conserve marine animal species; it specifies that all wild pinnipeds cannot be touched or fed.

== Gallery ==
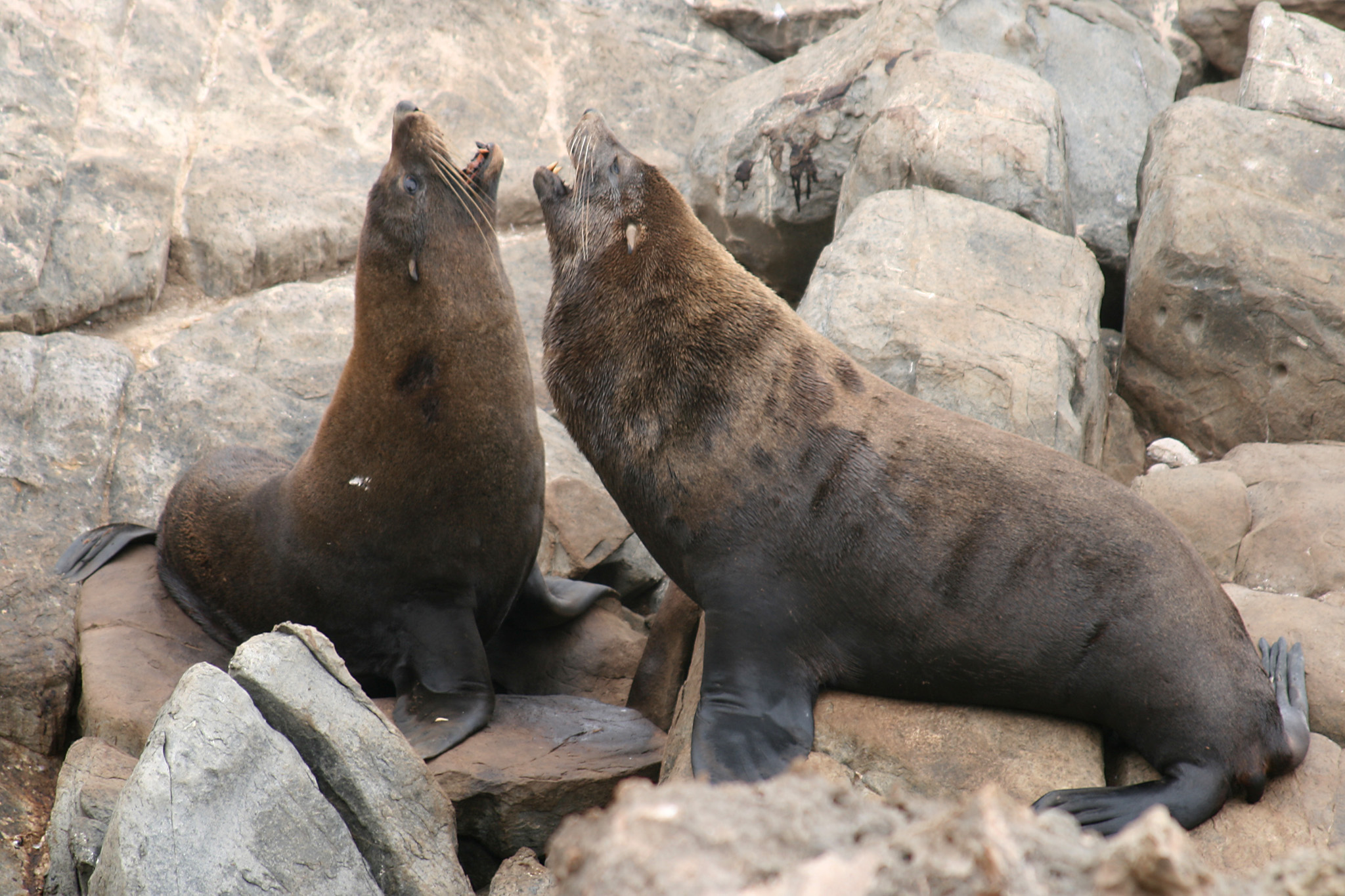

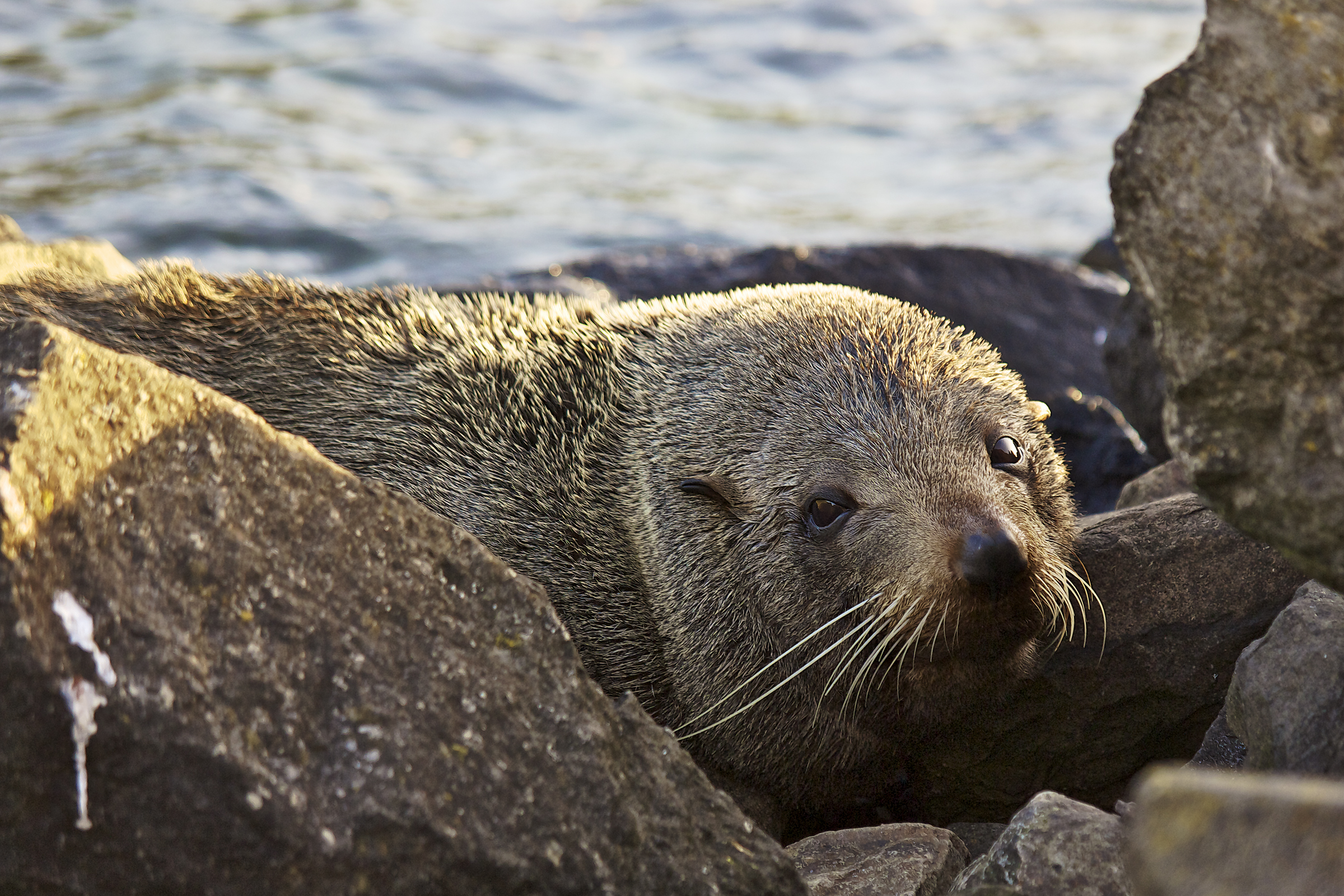
South Island, New Zealand

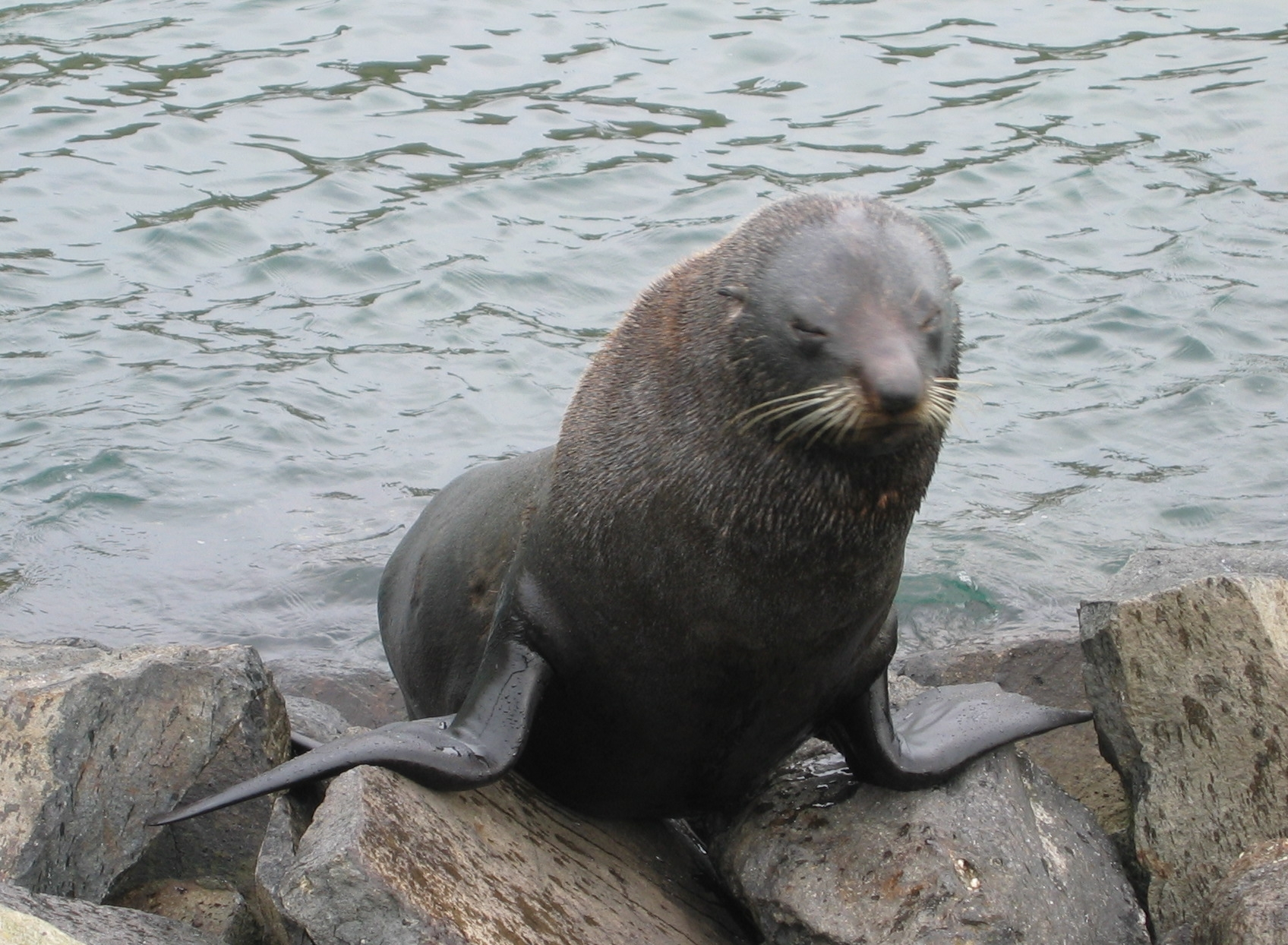
Coming ashore below Taiaroa Head, near Dunedin, New Zealand

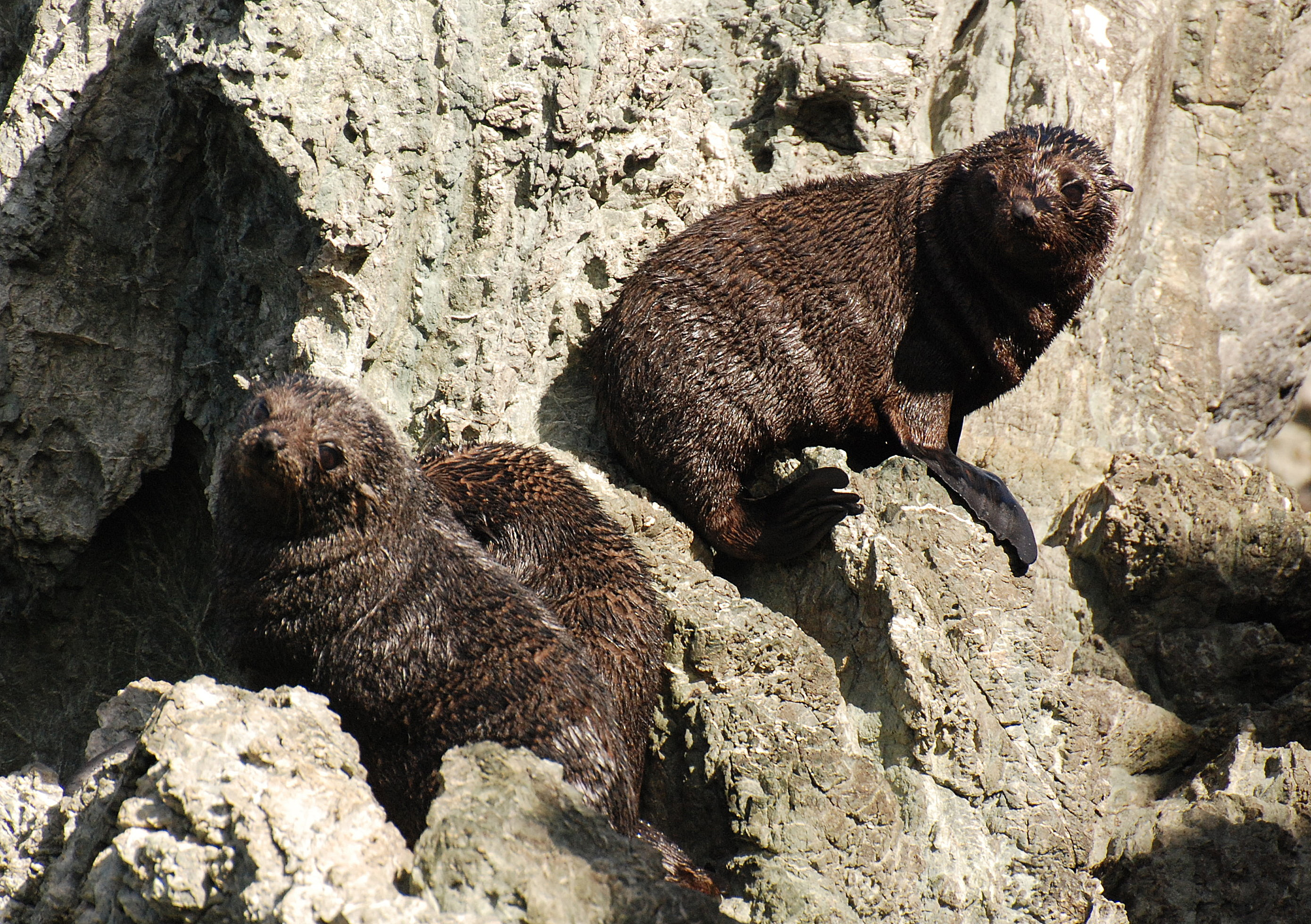
Pups at Palliser Bay, New Zealand

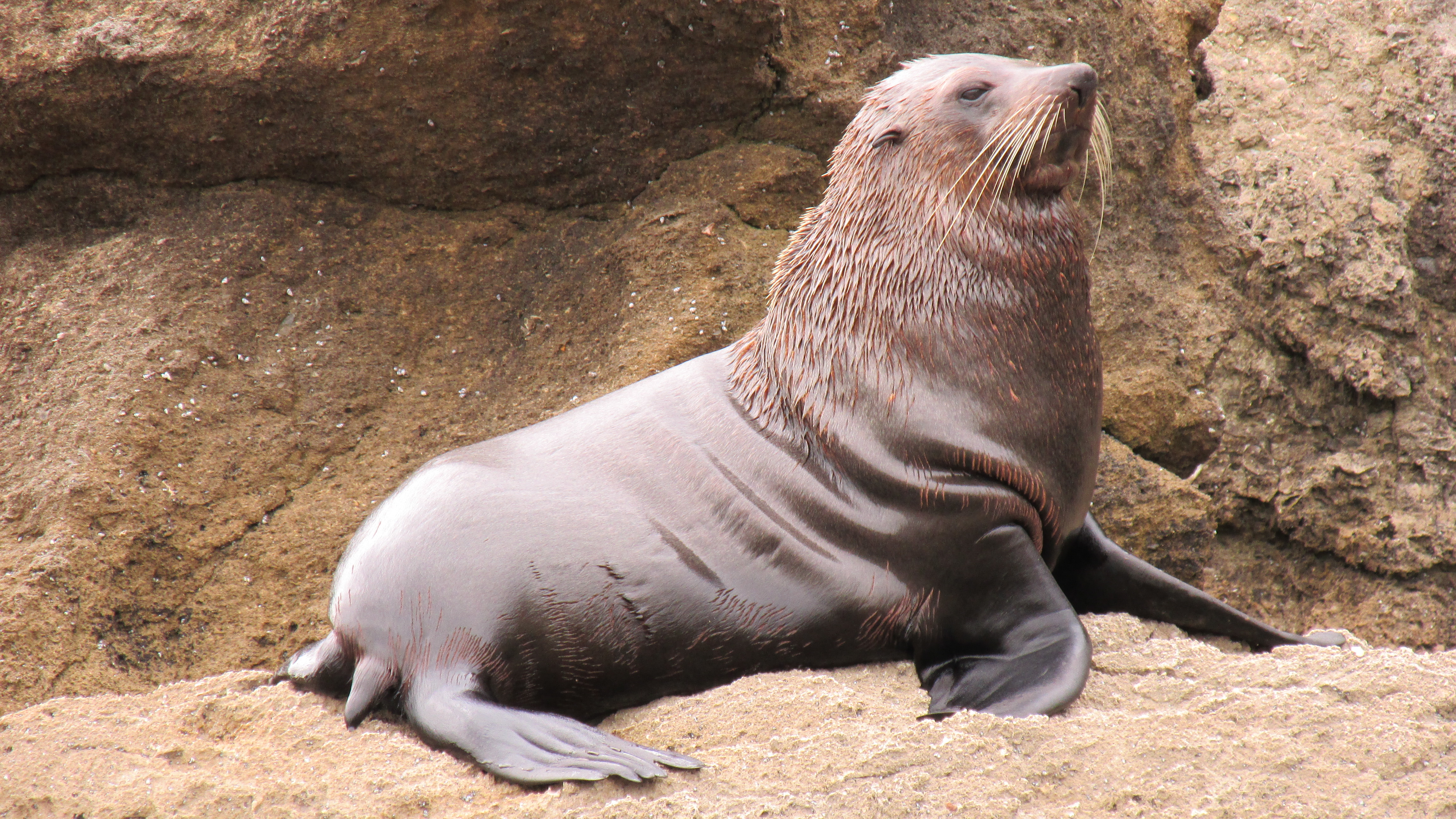
At Castlepoint, New Zealand

== See also ==
- Seal culling in South Australia
- Sealers' War (1810s–1820s, New Zealand)

== Sources ==
- Randall R. Reeves; Brent S. Stewart; Phillip J. Clapham; James A. Powell (2002). National Audubon Society Guide to Marine Mammals of the World. Alfred A. Knopf, Inc. ISBN 0-375-41141-0.
