= Seal culling in South Australia =

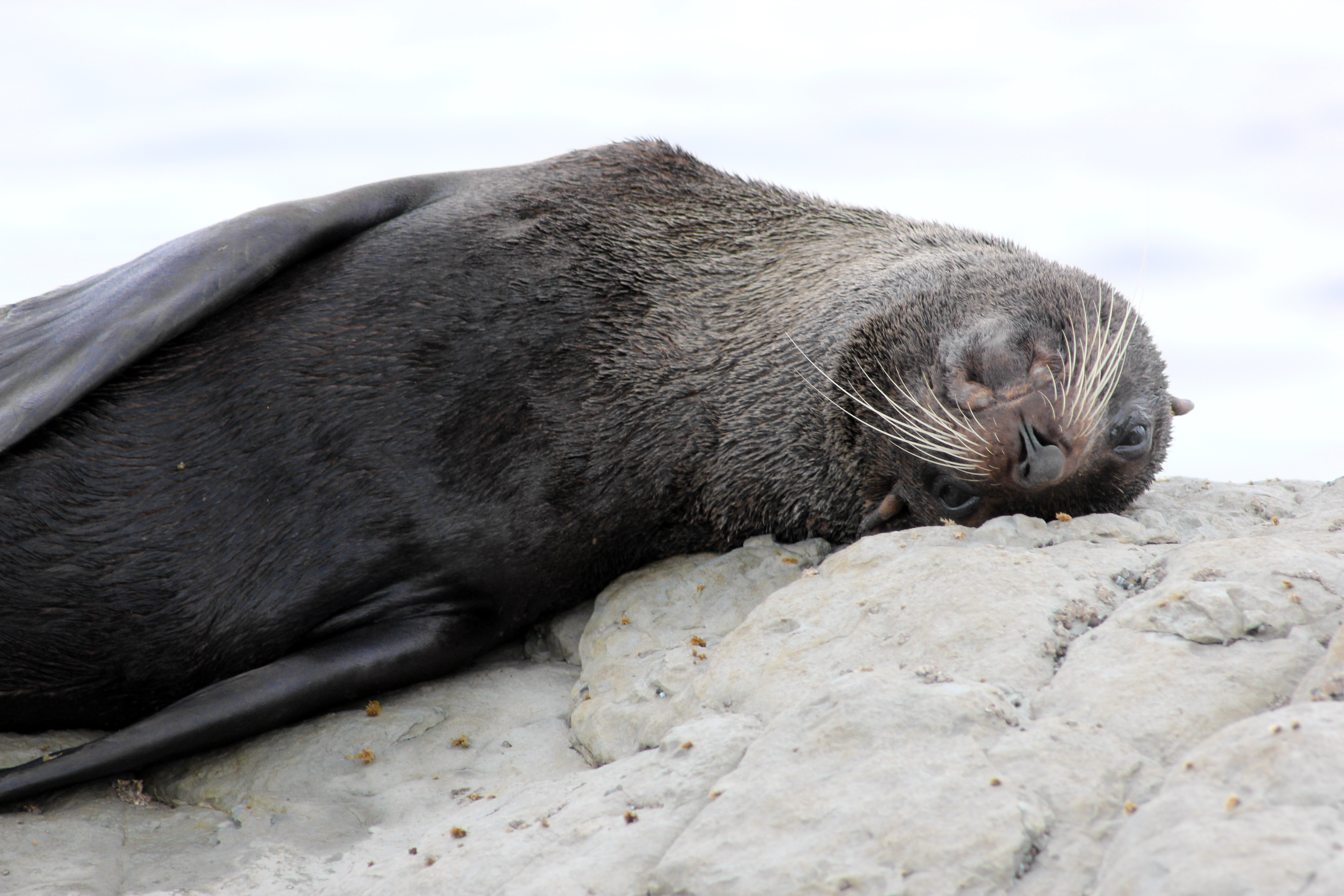
Arctophoca forsteri

Seal culling in South Australia has particularly targeted Arctophoca forsteri, the indigenous long-nosed fur seal (also known as the New Zealand fur seal). Beginning in the last years of the 18th century, both fur seals and Australian sea lions were hunted along the south-east coast of the Australian continent. They were a valuable source of leather, and their bodies were rendered to obtain oil, which was used as lamp fuel, cooking oil, a lubricant, a constituent of soap, the liquid base for red ochre paint, and for processing materials such as leather and jute.

During the 20th century, seals were sometimes culled on the assumption that they were competing with fishermen. Under the South Australian National Parks and Wildlife Act 1972 seals and other pinnipeds are now fully protected, although culling them remains a topic of public debate. Culling was strongly advocated for in 2015 in response to increasing interactions between seals and the fishing industry. As of 2016, there were an estimated 100,000 long-nosed fur seals in South Australian waters.

== History ==
Despite its common name, the New Zealand fur seal (A. forsteri) is a pinniped native to South Australia. Efforts to overcome that confusion have led to the increasing use of the common name, "long-nosed fur seal".

=== 1800–1899 ===
The species was heavily hunted by sealers in the early 19th century. Seals were clubbed to death by men who raided seal colonies and rookeries by boat, sometimes swimming ashore armed with clubs and knives. The sealers typically bludgeoned the animals to death and used knives to skin the carcasses. Pups were usually killed along with their mothers, but sometimes kept as pets. The hides of the seals were pickled in brine and exported, and the oil was a valuable source of income. Seal hunting continued to occur in Gulf St. Vincent into the 1880s.

The colony of South Australia was only officially established in 1836, and so no baseline data exists for the South Australian seal population prior to the impact of hunting by Europeans. The gradual recovery of the population, spanning the past century, has brought them into increasing conflict with the state's fishing industry.

=== 1900–1949 ===
The killing of seals in South Australian waters continued into the 20th century, on the assumption that they were in competition with fishermen. 7,000 to 8,000 were estimated to have been killed in the six months prior to August 1918. One man alone, S. H. Sheridan of Glenelg, admitted to having killed 1,430 seals during that period on the islands of Spencer Gulf. Captain S. A. White, an "ardent nature lover", said of calls that seals should be killed for allegedly competing with fishermen:

It is not the seals, poor creatures, but that ever destructive being, man, who has created the dearth [of fish]. It is high time the Governments of this country let a glimmer of natural science into their deliberations, and not go for advice to those who are fighting against nature and bringing dire consequences upon their heads.

White estimated that prior to the European colonisation of South Australia, hundreds of thousands of seals likely inhabited its waters.

In 1929, The Advertiser reported that men had been landing on islands in Spencer Gulf and "molesting seals." At that time the animals were protected under the Animals and Bird Protection Act. It was prohibited "for any person to land on Dangerous Reef with a gun or a dog, or to take seals on any of the islands or reefs within St. Vincent or Spencer Gulf north of a line from Cape Catastrophe to Cape Borda, continued to Cape Hart at the south-eastern corner of Kangaroo Island, thence to the mouth of the River Murray."

Seals were known to enter inland river systems and were seen as far up the Murray–Darling system as Deniliquin, 1,000 miles (1,600 km) from the mouth of the Murray. A hotel at Conargo once displayed the skin of a seal shot in the river nearby. Other accounts of inland seal sightings prior to 1933 include at Tyntynder, Pental Island, Echuca and near Swan Hill. Other sighting locations include Loxton and Mildura. Seen in this inland context, seals were often referred to as bunyips or otherwise misidentified.

In 1940, some fishermen claimed to have suffered damage to their nets which they attributed to seals. The Chief Inspector of Fisheries and Game at the time suspected that some of the damage had not been done by seals, but rather by sharks. At that time, fishermen in the neighbouring state of Victoria were allowed to shoot seals which interfered with their fishing efforts or equipment.

=== 1950–1999 ===
In 1954, W. W. Jenkins suggested in Parliament that an open season should be called to keep "pest" seal numbers in check. Fisherman A. W. Lundstrom wrote that, before the barrages were built across the River Murray, seals were often seen near the town of Goolwa. Construction of the Goolwa Barrages began in 1935 and they were completed in 1940. Lundstrom, acting as President of the Southern Fishermen's Association wrote of the seals: "We as fishermen still maintain that the seal is a menace to the fishing industry in the same way as the rabbits, dingoes or kangaroos are to the landholder."

At the time, three fishermen in the Victor Harbor area had permission to shoot seals which interfered with their fishing nets. One of them, A. J. Jenkins, called for an "open season" on seals, stating: "We want the seals' sanctuary on the islands abolished and a continuous open season declared so these pests may be destroyed at their breeding grounds."

The article in which Jenkins is quoted also claimed that seals consumed up to 40 pounds (18 kg) of fish each day. In a written reply, A. Keith Minchin, Director of Adelaide's Koala Farm, called the claim "a colossal exaggeration" and wrote that even a large seal would consume less than 12 pounds (5.4 kg) of fish daily.

In 1967, it was alleged that fishermen were harpooning seals and dolphins in South Australian waters and using the meat as crayfish bait. The claim was refuted by W.R. Thompson, a government fisheries inspector. He stated that permits to cull seals could be made available, and had been previously when net damage caused by seals had been demonstrated. At the time such permits were to be issued "only when deemed absolutely necessary."

In 1984, Australian sea lions were reportedly responsible for damaging the nets of fishermen near Victor Harbor. Fishermen's applications for permits to kill the animals were rejected due to the species' low population. As of 2015, the Australian sea lion remains an endangered species.

=== 2000–present ===
The southern bluefin tuna ranching industry was established in the early 1990s and reported increasing interactions with fur seals in the 2010s. That led the industry to seek permission to kill seals that they claimed they could recognise. Marcus Stehr, son of Hagen Stehr and executive of the Stehr Group, told The Advertiser in 2012 that fur seal interactions were costing their southern bluefin tuna ranching aquaculture business "at least $1 million" annually. He stated:

Seals cost the entire industry millions of dollars every year and we do need support from the State Government to look at how we manage them. In SA we have failed to develop any strategies to manage growing seal numbers and it's vital that this begins.

In 2013, Brian Jeffriess told The Advertiser, "Attacks by seals are a major problem for tuna ranching. They are the largest cause of tuna deaths in the pontoons and frighten the other tuna so they do not eat for days."

Also in 2013, The Advertiser reported that New Zealand fur seals ate an average of 4.5 kilograms of marine species each per day. At that time the state population was estimated at over 85,000 animals.[22] In 2015, Dr Brad Page told the ABC that the population had reached 100,000 animals. He also stated that most of the fur seals' diet consists of red bait and arrow squid, and not species which are typically caught and sold for human consumption.[23]

In August 2014, two decapitated New Zealand fur seals were found in Louth Bay, southern Spencer Gulf. The circumstances of their death were regarded as suspicious.

In June 2015, the prospect of seal culling in South Australia became a subject of increasing public debate and controversy. Mounting frustration among fishermen led some to admit that they would consider taking action themselves in order to protect their livelihoods. A seal was also killed at Murray Bridge after being hit by a boat during a ski-racing event. Approximately five seals were seen in the area, and the event was cancelled after the animal was hit. Its injuries were assessed by a local vet who then put the seal down.

In July 2015, fishermen from the Lower Lakes and Coorong region reported that fur seals had damaged their fishing nets.

In August 2015, Narrinjeri elder and fisherman Darrell Sumner admitted to having killed at least four seals and injuring another. He threatened to kill more animals in the future, and believed that the seals were killing pelicans, his people's totem animal. The Narrinjeri believe that pelicans embody the spirits of their dead ancestors, and has said that he didn't care that killing or hurting the animals was an illegal act under "white man's law".

Fishermen believe that seals are competing with wild catch fisheries, and have reported net damage that they claim was caused by fur seals. Southern bluefin tuna ranchers have reported stock losses at their sea-cage aquaculture operations. Regions in which claims have been made that fur seals are affecting fisheries and aquaculture businesses include: Kangaroo Island, the Lower lakes and Coorong, and southern Spencer Gulf.

== Status ==
In 2012, a spokesperson for the Environment Department of the Government of South Australia told The Advertiser:

The Government does not support culling, sterilisation or relocation of NZ fur seals in SA. Attempts interstate and overseas to manage seal populations through culling, sterilisation or relocation have proven resource-hungry and largely ineffectual and any benefit received from relocating a small number of seals would likely be lost due to the influx of new seals.

In April 2016, South Australia's environment minister Ian Hunter reaffirmed the Government's position stating "the best available science" showed a cull "would not work". He told The Advertiser that the Government was instead "focusing our resources on measures to reduce the impact of long nosed fur seal populations, including trialing different nets and underwater cracker deterrents."

All seals and sealions are protected in South Australian waters as listed marine mammals under the National Parks and Wildlife Act 1972. They are also protected as a marine species under the EPBC Act 1999. This increases the area in which they are protected to include Commonwealth waters and lands controlled by the Commonwealth government.

== Advocates for culling ==
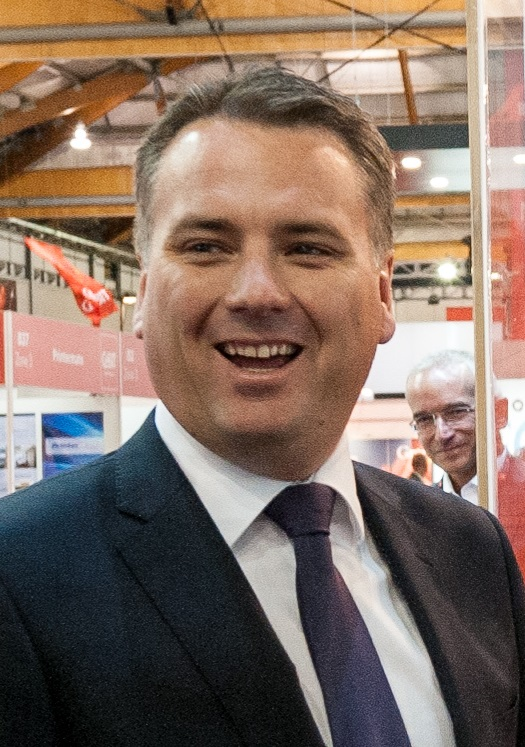
Jamie Briggs

Culling seals in South Australian waters has been advocated for most strongly by fishermen and aquaculture operators who claim that their businesses have suffered as a result of the population's recovery. Other advocates include Liberal Party politicians, conservative newspaper columnist and Liberal member Nicolle Flint, a penguin tour operator in Kangaroo Island and their supporters.

The owner of the Kangaroo Island Penguin Centre, John Ayliffe has advocated for the culling of fur seals on Kangaroo Island, which he believes have impacted little penguin colonies, and therefore his business.

Politicians advocating for the commencement of a cull have included Liberal Party MPs Adrian Pederick, Michael Pengilly and Jamie Briggs.

== Opposition to culling ==
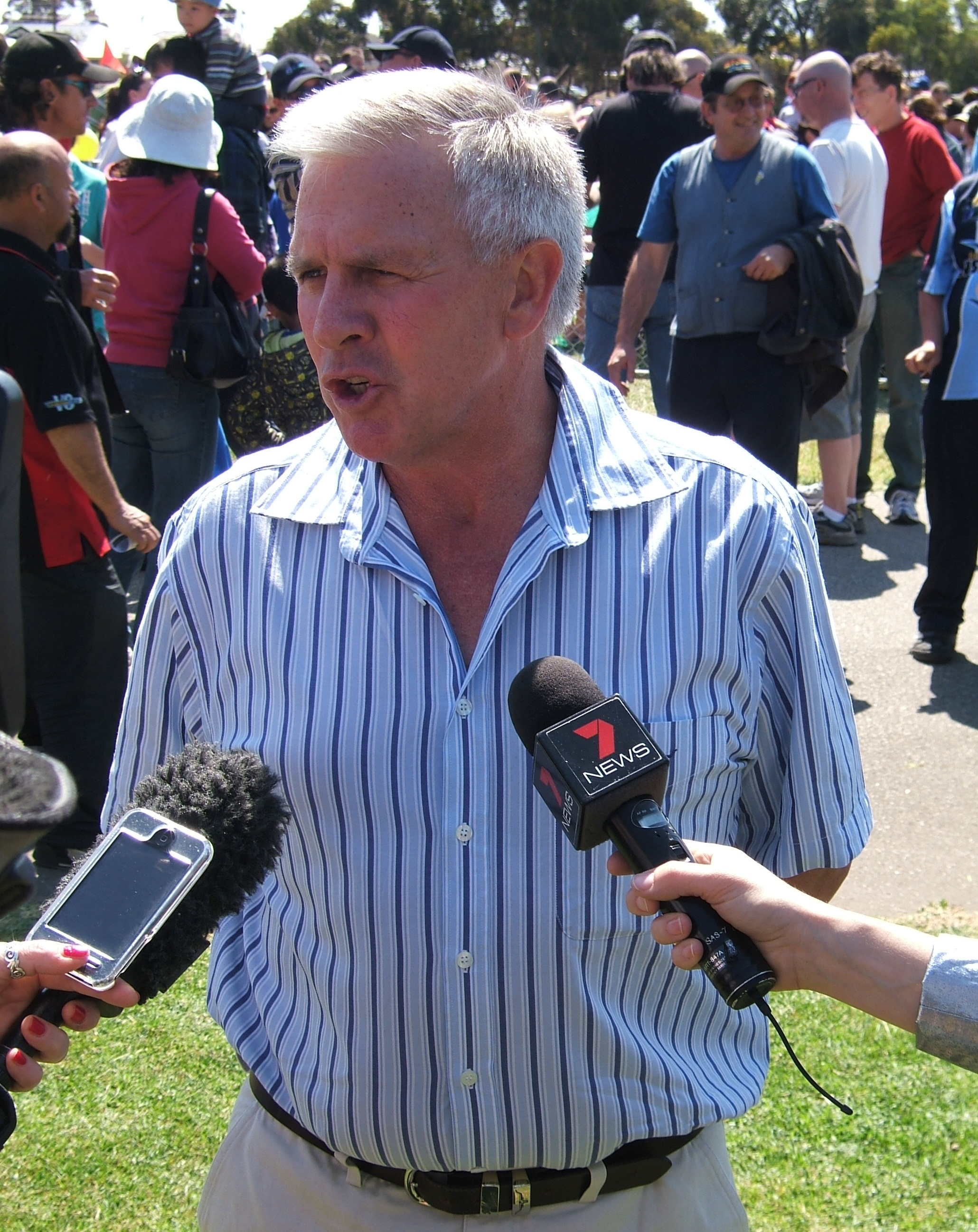
Robert Brokenshire

Peter Shaughnessy of the South Australian Museum advised that the culling of seals in South Australia would be a bad idea. Political opposition to the culling of seals in South Australia has been demonstrated by animal rights activists, including Animals Australia and the Seals of Nam. Both organisations have created petitions encouraging people to sign and express their opposition to any future cull. Australian Greens MLC Tammy Franks has spoken out against culling, along with the Humane Society International.

While Family First politician Robert Brokenshire has been critical of the Government's "do nothing" approach, he has also expressed concern over the impact that seal culling could have on the State's reputation and tourism industry. He told the ABC, "Some people have called for culling, now the reality is that we can't do that. It would just damage our economy, it would ruin our tourism."

== Culling in other Australian states ==
SA Shark Industry spokesman Kyri Toumazos suggested that a permitting scheme for seal culling operates in Tasmania. According to the Tasmanian government, all seals in Tasmanian waters are protected. In response to the question "Do seals threaten fisheries?" the Tasmanian government has stated:

Some fishermen complain about seals, accusing them of taking all their fish. Occasionally fishermen suggest that seals should be culled and that this will increase fish stocks and there will then be more available for human consumption. However, closer examination of seal-fishery interactions at the ecosystem level suggests that removing or culling seals may in fact be detrimental to fish stocks rather than beneficial. Remove a top predator and the whole system runs the risk of collapse.
