= Adrian Pederick =

Australian politician

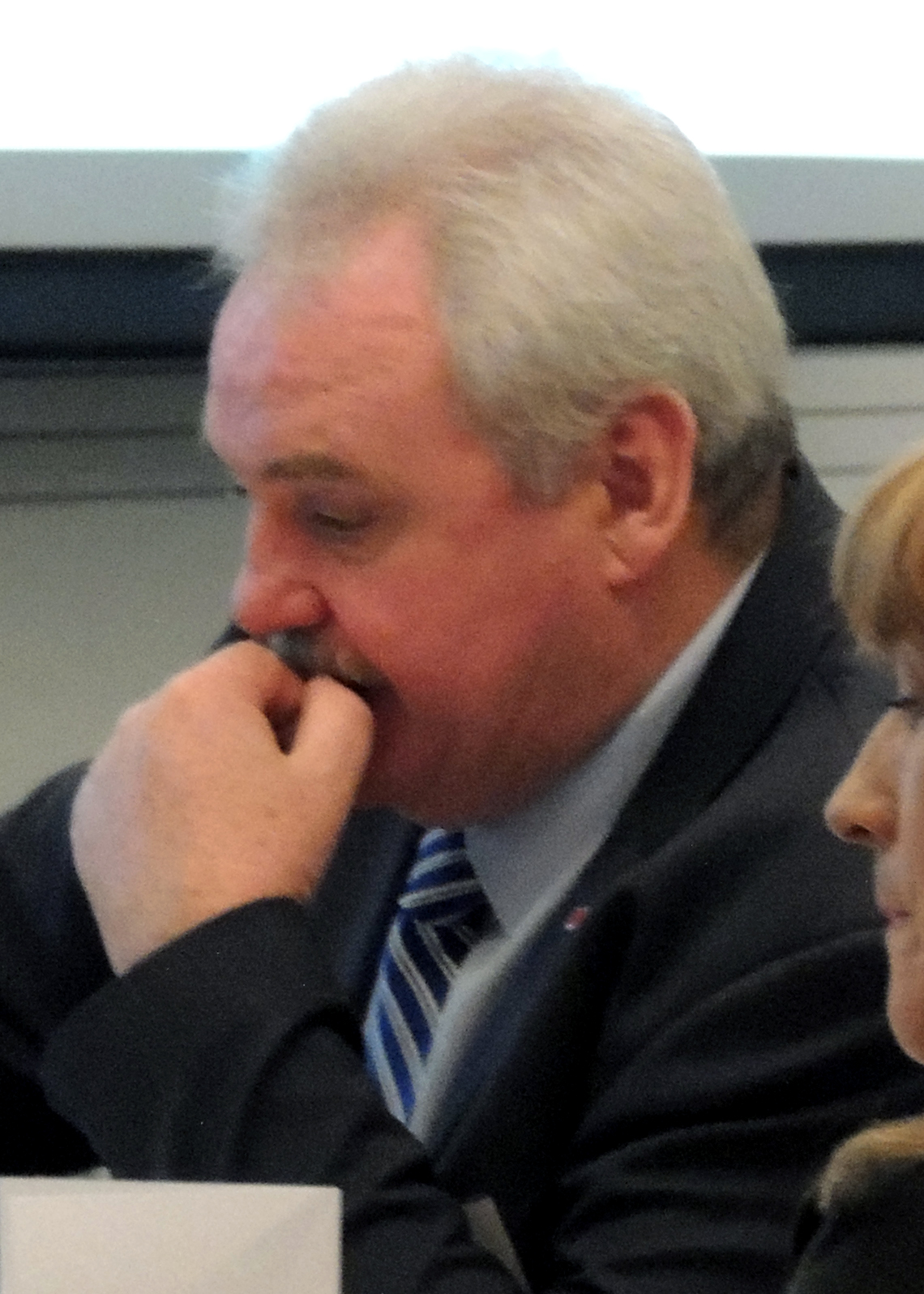

Member of the South Australian House of Assembly for Hammond
- In office 18 March 2006 – 20 March 2026
- Preceded by: Peter Lewis
- Succeeded by: Robert Roylance

Personal details
- Born: Adrian Stephen Pederick; 4 September 1962 (age 64) Adelaide, South Australia
- Party: South Australian Liberal Party

Adrian Stephen Pederick (/ˈpɛdrɪk/ PED-rik; born 4 September 1962) is an Australian politician who served as the member for Hammond in the South Australian House of Assembly from 2006 until his defeat at the 2026 election. He is a member of the Liberal party.

Pederick won Hammond from Liberal-turned-independent Peter Lewis who left to contest a seat in the Upper House. Previous to his election in to politics, Pederick managed a family dryland and grazing enterprise property at Coomandook for the past 14 years and is a supporter of local and regional community causes and events. The 2006 election saw Pederick elected with a 12.0-point margin. He was reelected for a third consecutive term in the 2014 election.

== Parliamentary career ==
=== Fracking ===
In September 2013, Pederick told the South Australian Parliament that he had been involved with fracking 'thirty years ago' in the Cooper Basin in South Australia. He said "When I was involved and worked for Gearheart Australia and we were shooting wells in 1983 and 1984, we worked alongside Halliburton to complete those jobs." He went on to describe the process of fracking as he had witnessed it at the time, before discussing water issues:

"There is a lot of concern, obviously, about possible contamination—whether it is groundwater contamination or freshwater contamination—and the last thing oil companies want (the last thing anyone wants) is shooting off site because when you are shooting oil and gas, you do not want to shoot water... There has been a lot of emotion, and I concur with the member for Waite's comments that, yes, we do need to get on with the job, we do need to be careful, and we do need to make sure we have the appropriate environmental management and the appropriate water management. But I can assure you—and I know very much from experience—the last thing people want to do is make a mistake in these jobs."

He concluded his presentation by supporting the expansion of the practise in South Australia by saying:

"We do have to make sure that the process is operated effectively and we certainly cannot have a process where hydraulic fracturing is taken out of the equation, because it is certainly a big part of making sure that the economy of this state gets going."

In June 2015, Pederick went on a fracking fact-finding trip to the US with fellow South Australian politicians Troy Bell, Mark Parnell and John Darley, and farmer David Smith.

=== Seal culling ===
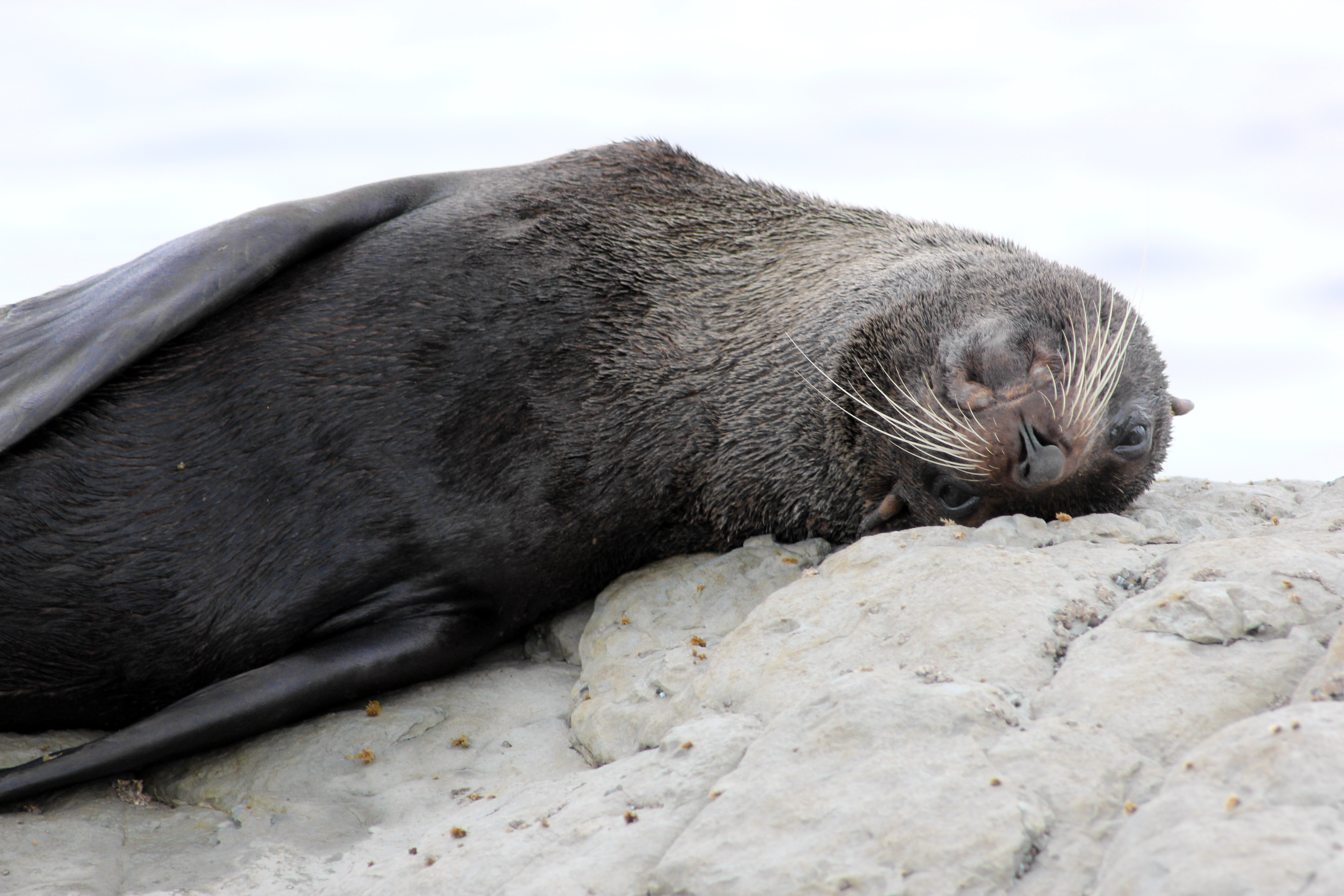
Arctocephalus forsteri – New Zealand fur seal

Pederick has advocated for the seal culling in South Australia. Arctocephalus forsteri, which is native to South Australia is protected as a marine mammal listed under the National Parks and Wildlife Act 1973. In 2012 he called for the animals to be sterilised on Kangaroo Island, where he believed that they were impacting little penguin populations. In 2015 he claimed that the animals were in Lake Albert, Lake Alexandrina and the Coorong, where they were causing "distress in the environment but also major distress to the fishing industry." He has suggested a "sustainable harvest" of the species, with potential opportunities for the complementary use of scare tactics. He has also suggested that local abattoirs could potentially process seal meat. He has referred the species as "rats of the sea" and claimed that the animals have attacked fishermen's nets and damaged them. He told The Victor Harbor Times that "they kill fish, and cost thousands of dollars in lost production of fish and in lost sales due to damage."

He told ABC:

"They're eating in just three days the equivalent of the whole lakes and Coorong fishery allocation for one year and people down there, as far as the fishing side of it, are having trouble paying their licence fees, there's people looking at exiting the industry because they can't see any future so it's having a massive impact."

Pederick also commented on an incident in which a seal was hit and killed during a watersport event. He told PowerFM:

"As we saw with the speed ski titles in Murray Bridge in early June, the titles had to be pulled up because sadly a fur seal was hit by a boat. If those seals keep invading the river like that what is the government going to do? Are they going to decide to stop all recreational boating on the river? That would be a half a billion dollar impact to the South Australian River Murray system right throughout."

Pederick has said that he has the backing of his Liberal colleagues with respect to the 'humane' culling of fur seals in South Australia.

=== Finn's Law ===
In August 2014 Pederick introduced a law that would allow the opportunity for foster carers to be recognised on death certificates of children who die while in their care, and be involved in their funeral arrangements.

Pederick designed the law after meeting one of his constituents, Monica Perrett, who was denied any information about her foster son Finn's death as she was not the biological mother.

Attorney-General John Rau said the Government would consider the Bill, but noted that it was a complex area of law.

=== Country member's accommodation allowance ===
In 2020, Pederick was one of a group of country members of parliament accused of having made false claims for Country Member's Accommodation Allowance, a payment made available for when members based away from Adelaide were required to be in Adelaide for parliamentary business. Pederick was one of a group who were cleared from further enquiry by the Independent Commissioner Against Corruption (ICAC) in a public announcement by Ann Vanstone on 15 October 2020.

South Australian House of Assembly
Preceded by Peter Lewis	Member for Hammond; 2006–2026	Succeeded by Robert Roylance
