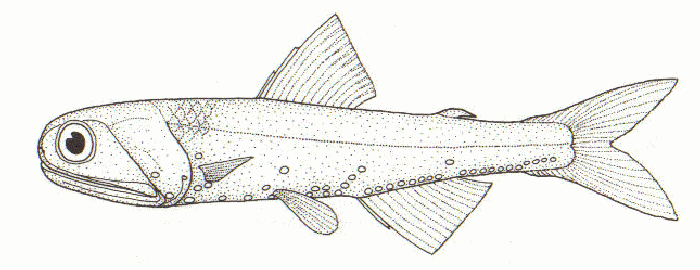

Scientific classification
- Kingdom: Animalia
- Phylum: Chordata
- Class: Actinopterygii
- Order: Myctophiformes
- Family: Myctophidae
- Genus: Lampanyctodes; Fraser-Brunner, 1949
- Species: L. hectoris

Binomial name
- Lampanyctodes hectoris (Günther, 1876)

Synonyms
- Scopelus hectoris, Günther, 1876); Scopelus argenteus, Gilchrist, 1904

= Hector's lanternfish =

Species of fish

Hector's lanternfish (Lampanyctodes hectoris) is a lanternfish in the family Myctophidae, the only species in the genus Lampanyctodes. It is named after James Hector.

It is a widespread marine fish, known from shallow tropical waters in the south-eastern Atlantic, from the western Pacific off Australia and New Zealand, and from the eastern Pacific off Chile. It is one of the few species of lanternfishes to inhabit shallow waters, and in those waters it is one of the most abundant species of fish, and central to the food chain of the upper continental slope. The abundance is due to its high fecundity — it spawns multiple times in the winter so that the fry can take advantage of the spring bloom of krill.

It grows up to 73 millimetres (2.9 in) standard length (SL) and may reach the age of 3 years. It reaches sexual maturity at approximately 50 millimetres (2.0 in) SL and age of one year.

Hector's lanternfish is fished commercially using seine nets in the waters off South Africa, where catches have reached 42,400 tonnes. The catch is ground up to make fish meal and fish oil.
