= Robert Roylance =

Australian politician

Robert Roylance MP

Member of the South Australian House of Assembly for Hammond
- Incumbent
- Assumed office 21 March 2026
- Preceded by: Adrian Pederick

Personal details
- Party: One Nation

Robert Joseph Roylance is an Australian politician, and has represented the district of Hammond in the South Australian House of Assembly since the 2026 state election. Roylance is a member of One Nation, and prior to his election was a ferry operator and distiller.

== Career ==
Then a ferry operator and distiller from Mannum, South Australia, Roylance launched his campaign for the 2026 state election in December 2025, standing for One Nation in the district of Hammond. At the time, Roylance described his priorities if he were elected as the cost of living, preventing ambulance ramping, repealing the South Australian Voice to Parliament, and supporting education "free from indoctrination". At the 2026 election, Hammond was too close to call on election night, with Roylance, Labor candidate Simone Bailey, and Liberal incumbent Adrian Pederick, all in contention. Roylance was ultimately successful, defeating Bailey in the two-candidate-preferred tally to win the seat of Hammond.

== Biography ==
Roylance lived in China for 6 years.

South Australian House of Assembly
Preceded by Adrian Pederick	Member for Hammond; 2026–present	Incumbent
